= List of Lethwei fighters =

This is a list of notable athletes and well-known Lethwei practitioners who competed, sorted by area of place of birth.

== Myanmar ==
- (Myanmar) Tun Tun Min
- (Myanmar) Saw Nga Man
- (Myanmar) Lone Chaw
- (Myanmar) Shwe Sai
- (Myanmar) Too Too
- (Myanmar) Tun Lwin Moe
- (Myanmar) Soe Lin Oo
- (Myanmar) Mite Yine
- (Myanmar) Saw Ba Oo
- (Myanmar) Kyar Ba Nyein
- (Myanmar) Wan Chai
- (Myanmar) Tway Ma Shaung

== Canada ==
- (Canada) Dave Leduc

== United States ==
- (United States) Cyrus Washington

== Europe ==
- (Poland) Artur Saladiak
- (Ukraine) Sasha Moisa
- (Lithuania) Julija Stoliarenko

== Asia ==
- (Uzbekistan) Naimjon Tuhtaboyev
- (Vietnam) Nguyễn Trần Duy Nhất
- (Japan) Akitoshi Tamura

== Others ==
Athletes from different countries who competed in Lethwei at least once:

- (Thailand) Saiyok Pumpanmuang
- (Thailand) Nilmungkorn Sudsakorngym
- (Thailand) Pakorn P.K. Saenchai Muaythaigym
- (Thailand) Diesellek TopkingBoxing
- (Thailand) Iquezang Kor.Rungthanakeat
- (Thailand) Singmanee Kaewsamrit
- (Thailand) Detrit Sathian Gym
- (Thailand) Berneung TopkingBoxing
- (Thailand) Chanajon P.K. Saenchai Muaythaigym
- (Thailand) Pongsiri P.K.Saenchaimuaythaigym
- (Thailand) Sorgraw Petchyindee Academy
- (Thailand) Kompetch Fairtex
- (Thailand) Avatar Tor.Morsri
- (Uganda) Umar Semata
- (France) Corentin Jallon
- (United States) Seth Baczynski
- (United States) Doug Evans
- (United States) Shannon Ritch
- (Japan) Shunichi Shimizu
- (Japan) Yuichiro Nagashima
- (Australia) Hartley Jackson
- (France) Bastien Cabanes GUC Bando

== Literature ==
- Maung Gyi, Burmese bando boxing, Ed. R.Maxwell, Baltimore, 1978
- Zoran Rebac, Traditional Burmese boxing, Ed. Paladin Press, Boulder, 2003

== See also ==
- Lethwei
- Bando
- Naban
