= Thway Thit Win Hlaing =

Burmese boxer

- Born: Saw Win Hlaing; 1995 (age 30–31); Htaw Mae Par, Hpa-an, Kayin State, Myanmar
- Native name: စောဝင်းလှိုင်
- Height: 1.70 m (5 ft 7 in)
- Weight: 75 kg (165 lb; 12 st)
- Division: Light Middleweight; Openweight
- Style: Lethwei
- Stance: Southpaw
- Team: Family Wan Chai
- Teachers: U Aung Mon, U Kyaw Thein Too
- Trainer: U Wan Chai
- Rank: First class
- Years active: 2002-present

Other information
- Spouse: Nan Moe Thuzar Aung (m. 2020)
- Children: 1
- Notable relatives: Thway Thit Than Hlaing (brother)

Thway Thit Win Hlaing (Burmese: သွေးသစ်ဝင်းလှိုင်) is a Karen (or) Burmese Lethwei fighter and former openweight Lethwei world Champion. He is known as counter fighter relying on counters rather than straight offence.

== Lethwei career ==
Thway Thit Win Hlaing rose to prominence in 2014. In 2017, he was part of the ONE Championship roster for a single match. The un-televised lethwei bout was held under the ruleset of the newly formed partnership with WLC

In 2017, ONE Championship began talks of a partnership with World Lethwei Championship to share athletes to fight in each other's organization. On 30 June 2017, Thway Thit Win Hlaing fought in the second Lethwei match ever held by ONE Championship at ONE: Light of a Nation and he defeated Soe Htet Oo by decision according to the WLC point system, where a winner must be chosen by judges decision if the fight goes the distance. Thway Thit Win Hlaing was one of the most successful fighters of the World Lethwei Championship.

On Armed Forced Day in 2018, an event was held in Maungdaw, Rakhine State. A local wealthy entrepreneur invested in hosting the event, which was green-lit by Senior General Min Aung Hlaing. The military has a long history of supporting Myanmar's traditional fighting arts. It was seen as a move by the military and pro-ethnic Rakhine that peace had returned and to avert attention from the Rohingya crisis. Win Hlaing was featured in the main event against Saw Ba Oo.

The fight between Win Hlaing and Reza at Win Sein in 2020 was almost called off as Thway Thit Win Hlaing was not feeling well. Before the fight they repeatedly checked his hydration levels to make sure he could compete. The fight ended up in his favour when he knocked Reza out in round 2.

The eagerly awaited fight between Thway Thit Win Hlaing and Lethwei star Soe Lin Oo, whom he had never fought before, finally took place in 2022. However, it was reduced to only three rounds as a result of the aftermath of the 2021 coup d'etat.

=== Openweight Lethwei World Champion ===
On January 29, 2023, Thway Thit Win Hlaing faced former openweight Openweight Lethwei World Champion, Tun Tun Min at The Great Lethwei 3' in Yangon, Myanmar. Tun Tun Min, who weighs over 80 kg and fights most of his matches in the openweight category agreed to meet at the catchweight of 77 kg. The incumbent Myanmar Lethwei Champion Dave Leduc vacated the openweight Lethwei World Championship sanctioned by the MTLF vacated the title prior to the match and Thway Thit Win Hlaing and Tun Tun Min competed for the vacant title. In the event where the champion vacates the title, the two top contenders are required to fight for the belt. In these case of the Lethwei Golden Belt, in order to have a champion, the fight cannot end in a draw, a winner must obligatory be declared even if there is no knockout. In the fourth round, Thway Thit Win Hlaing dominated and managed to knocked down Tun Tun Min to the floor twice and the referee had to count twice. Thway Thit Win Hlaing was declared the winner by decision and became openweight Myanmar Lethwei champion.

On August 20, 2023, Thway Thit Win Hlaing rematched Tun Tun Min under Traditional rules with the Openweight Lethwei World Championship at stake. The match ended as a draw with Thway Thit Win Hlaing remaining champion.

== Personal life ==
Win Hlaing is the son of U Saw Win Shwe and Daw Nan Cho Cho Lay. His brother, Than Hlaing, had a brief career in boxing. Win Hlaing got married in Hpa-an on February 26, 2020, and has expressed his desire to have children.

== Titles and accomplishments ==
- Lethwei World Champion
  - Openweight Lethwei Golden Belt
    - Eleven (11) successful title defenses

Other hampionships

  - 2018 Golden Belt Championship (71 kg)
  - 2016 Golden Belt Championship (67 kg)

Awards, records, and honours

  - 2019 Breakthrough fighter of the year
  - World Lethwei Championship #2 Ranked Light Middleweight

== Lethwei record ==
Lethwei record
95 fights, 51 wins (43 (T)KOs), 1 loss, 43 draws
Date	Result	Opponent	Event	Location	Method	Round	Time
2024-11-09	Draw	(Myanmar) Tun Tun Min	(69th) Karen State Day	Hpa-an, Myanmar	Draw	5	3:00
2024-04-16	Win	(Iran) Ali Khodarahmi	Myanmar vs. Thailand Challenge Fights	Myawaddy, Myanmar	TKO (Broken arm)	1	
2024-04-01	Draw	(Myanmar) Aung Khaing	Ma Eh Village Challenge Fights	Hlaingbwe Township, Myanmar	Draw	3	3:00
2024-01-28	Draw	(Myanmar) Kyaw Swar Win	The Great Lethwei 6	Yangon, Myanmar	Draw	5	3:00
2024-01-12	Win	(Thailand) Oran Kaewsamrit	Karen National New Year Challenge Fights	Myawaddy, Myanmar	TKO	2	
2023-11-26	Win	(Myanmar) Shukleine Min	The Great Lethwei 5	Yangon, Myanmar	KO	1	
2023-11-09	Draw	(Myanmar) Kyaw Swar Win	(68th) Karen State Day	Hpa-an, Myanmar	Draw	5	3:00
2023-08-20	Draw	(Myanmar) Tun Tun Min	Myanmar Lethwei World Championship	Yangon, Myanmar	Draw	5	3:00
2023-03-23	Win	(Thailand) Pongsaklek Sor.Hengcharoen	Myanmar vs. Thailand Challenge Fights	Myawaddy, Myanmar	TKO	3	
2023-03-05	Draw	(Thailand) Fahsura Khunkhao Phayayom	Myanmar vs. Thailand Challenge Fights	Hlaingbwe Township, Myanmar	Draw	5	3:00
2023-01-29	Win	(Myanmar) Tun Tun Min	The Great Lethwei 3	Yangon, Myanmar	Decision	5	3:00
Wins vacant Openweight Lethwei World title
2022-12-22	Draw	(Thailand) Seeharach Lookmahathat	Kyar Inn village Karen New Year	Hlaingbwe Township, Myanmar	Draw	5	3:00
2022-11-27	Win	(Myanmar) Soe Lin Oo	The Great Lethwei 1	Yangon, Myanmar	Decision (Unanimous)	5	3:00
2022-11-09	Win	(Myanmar) Aung Khaing	(67th) Karen State Day	Hpa-an, Myanmar	TKO	5	
2022-08-20	Draw	(Myanmar) Shuklaine Min	Shwe Koke Ko Myaing Challenge Fights	Myawaddy, Myanmar	Draw	5	3:00
For ISKA Light Welterweight World Championship (Oriental rules)
2022-01-02	Draw	(Myanmar) Soe Lin Oo	27th Myainggyingu Karen New Year Challenge Fights	Myaing Gyi Ngu, Hpa-an District, Myanmar	Draw	3	3:00
2021-11-07	Draw	(Myanmar) Shuklaine Min	(66th) Karen State Day, Hpa-an Indoor sports complex	Hpa-an, Myanmar	Draw	3	3:00
2021-02-18	Draw	(Myanmar) Thway Thit Aung	Apaung village Challenge Fights	Hlaingbwe Township, Myanmar	Draw	3	3:00
2021-02-12	Draw	(Myanmar) Thway Thit Aung	(74th) Karen State Union Day, Zwekabin Natural Resort	Hpa-an, Myanmar	Draw	3	3:00
2020-02-08	Draw	(Thailand) Fahphayap Kwaitonggym	(194th) Annual Lighting Festival	Kyondoe, Myanmar	Draw	5	3:00
2020-01-18	Win	(Iran) Reza Ahmadnezhad	Win Sein Taw Ya 2020	Mudon Township, Myanmar	TKO	2	
2020-01-06	Win	(Thailand) Jenrob Sujebamekieow	UMTA Lethwae Challenge	Yangon, Myanmar	KO	1	
2019-12-13	Draw	(Thailand) Avatar Tor.Morsri	Mandalar Thiri Indoor Stadium	Mandalay, Myanmar	Draw	5	3:00
2019-11-27	Draw	(Thailand) Boonpala Sitballsakon	Myaing Gyi Ngu Challenge Fights	Hpa-an District, Myanmar	Draw	5	3:00
2019-11-10	Win	(Thailand) Iquezang Kor.Rungthanakeat	64th Karen State Day	Hpa-an, Myanmar	KO	4	
2019-10-04	Win	(Thailand) Burutlek Petchyindee Academy	World Lethwei Championship 10: Fearless Tigers	Mandalay, Myanmar	KO	2	2:21
2019-04-15	Draw	(Thailand) Singmanee Kaewsamrit	Kyauk Khet village Challenge Fights	Myawaddy Township, Myanmar	Draw	5	3:00
2019-03-21	Draw	(Thailand) Petchnamnueng Amnat Muay Thai	Khalaung village, Ohn Ta Pin	Hpa-an Township, Myanmar	Draw	5	3:00
2019-02-19	Draw	(Thailand) Fahsura Wor.Petchpoon	Shwe San Taw Pagoda Festival	Ye, Mon State, Myanmar	Draw	5	3:00
2019-01-30	Draw	(Thailand) Sankom Sangmanee Gym	Win Sein Taw Ya 2019	Mudon Township, Myanmar	Draw	5	3:00
2018-11-26	Draw	(Thailand) Pongsaklek BCK Gym	Myaing Gyi Ngu Challenge Fights	Hpa-an District, Myanmar	Draw	5	3:00
2018-11-10	Draw	(Myanmar) Thway Thit Aung	(63rd) Kayin State Day	Hpa-an, Myanmar	Draw	5	3:00
2018-10-14	Win	(Thailand) Petsangnuan Sor.Chanasit	AH-GA Golden Belt Champions Challenge Fight	Yangon, Myanmar	KO	2	1:43
2018-08-10	Win	(Myanmar) Shan Ko	Golden Belt Championship final	Yangon, Myanmar	Decision	5	3:00
Wins Golden Belt Championship (71kg)
2018-07-21	Win	(Myanmar) Min Htet Aung	Golden Belt Championship semi-final	Yangon, Myanmar	KO	2	
2018-05-11	Draw	(Thailand) Pravit Sakmuangtalang	Kawt Darn Challenge Fights	Hpa-an, Myanmar	Draw	5	3:00
2018-03-27	Draw	(Myanmar) Saw Ba Oo	Armed Forces Day, Town Hall	Maungdaw, Rakhine State, Myanmar	Draw	5	3:00
2018-02-25	Draw	(Thailand) Boonpala Petchasira	Shwe Kyat Min Monastery	Kawkareik Township, Myanmar	Draw	5	3:00
2018-01-03	Draw	(Myanmar) Shwe Yar Man	Lethwei Challenge Fights	Ye, Mon State, Myanmar	Draw	5	3:00
2017-11-04	Win	(Myanmar) Shan Ko	World Lethwei Championship 3: Legendary Champions	Yangon, Myanmar	Decision	1	1:55
2017-10-08	Draw	(Myanmar) Saw Gaw Mu Do	GTG 5, Mandalar Thiri Stadium	Mandalay, Myanmar	Draw	5	3:00
2017-06-30	Win	(Myanmar) Soe Htet Oo	ONE Championship: Light of a Nation	Yangon, Myanmar	Decision	5	3:00
2017-06-10	Win	(Myanmar) Shwe Yar Man	World Lethwei Championship 2: Ancient Warriors	Yangon, Myanmar	Decision (Unanimous)	5	3:00
2017-03-26	Draw	(Myanmar) Shwe Yar Man	GTG 4, Thein Phyu Stadium	Yangon, Myanmar	Draw	5	3:00
2017-03-03	Win	(Myanmar) Saw Ba Oo	World Lethwei Championship 1: The Great Beginning	Yangon, Myanmar	Decision (Unanimous)	5	3:00
2017-01-06	Win	(Thailand) Petchpirun NK Fitnessmuaythai	Myanmar-Thai-Lao Challenge Fights	Mandalay, Myanmar	KO	2	
2016-12-19	Draw	(Thailand) Samson Phran26	(22nd) DKBA Anniversary	Myawaddy Township, Myanmar	Draw	5	3:00
2016-11-27	Win	(Myanmar) Phoe La Pyae	Mandalay Rumbling Challenge Fight	Yangon, Myanmar	KO	1	
2016-11-10	Draw	(Thailand) Phosailek Petchphosai	(61st) Kayin State Day	Hpa-an, Myanmar	Draw	5	3:00
2016-07-10	Win	(Myanmar) Ye Tagon	Golden Belt Championship final	Yangon, Myanmar	Decision (Unanimous)	5	3:00
Wins Golden Belt Championship (67kg)
2016-07-03	Win	(Myanmar) Phoe La Pyae	Golden Belt Championship semi-final	Yangon, Myanmar	KO	5	
2016-06-26	Win	(Myanmar) Bo Soe Aung	Golden Belt Championship quarter-final	Yangon, Myanmar	KO	1	
2016-04-18	Draw	(Myanmar) Ye Tagon	Don Yein Myay Waterfall	Kayin State, Myanmar	Draw	5	3:00
2016-01-10	Win	(Thailand) Petchseethong	Shwe Koke Ko Myaing Challenge Fights	Myawaddy, Myanmar	KO	3	
2015-11-12	Win	(Thailand) Fahmeechai Chor.Chanathip	(60th) Kayin State Day	Hpa-an, Myanmar	KO	4	
2015-04-19	Draw	(Myanmar) Thway Thit Aung	Lethwei Challenge Fights	Kayin State, Myanmar	Draw	5	3:00
2015-02-05	Draw	(Myanmar) Phoe La Pyae	Taungbon Challenge Fights	Ye Township, Myanmar	Draw	5	3:00
2014-12-30	Draw	(Myanmar) Phyan Thway	Lethwei Challenge Fights	Mandalay, Myanmar	Draw	5	3:00
2014-11-11	Draw	(Myanmar) Phoe La Pyae	(59th) Kayin State Day	Hpa-an, Myanmar	Draw	5	3:00
2014-01-24	Draw	(Thailand) Kongchumphae Tor.Pornchai	Win Sein Taw Ya 2014	Mudon Township, Myanmar	Draw	5	3:00
2014-01-18	Draw	(Myanmar) Thway Thit Aung	Taung Ka Lay Challenge Fights	Hpa-an, Myanmar	Draw	5	3:00
2013-12-31	Win	(Myanmar) One Star	Karen New Year 2753, Pay Pin Seik village	Hpa-an, Myanmar	KO	3	
2013-05-02	Win	(Myanmar) Saw William	Lethwei Challenge Fights	Mon State, Myanmar	KO	2	
2013-04-25	Loss	(Myanmar) Tha Pyay Nyo	Thaung Pyin Challenge Fights	Mon State, Myanmar	TKO	4	
2013-01-12		(Myanmar) Kyar Pauk	Myaing Kone Tan Gyi Village	Kayin State, Myanmar			
2012-01-18	Win	(Myanmar) Tun Win Aung	Win Sein Taw Ya 2012	Mudon Township, Myanmar	KO	1	
2011-08-13	Draw	(Myanmar) Win Mauk	Myanmar-Japan Goodwill Letwhay Competition	Yangon, Myanmar	Draw	4	3:00
2008-12-20		(Myanmar)	D.K.B.A 14th Anniversary	Myaing Gyi Ngu, Hpa-an District, Myanmar			
Legend: Win Loss Draw/No contest Notes

Awards and achievements
Preceded by Dave Leduc	Golden Belt – Openweight Lethwei World Champion; January 29, 2023 – Present	Incumbent
