= World Lethwei Championship =

Martial arts promotion in Myanmar (2015–2021)

- Type: Private
- Industry: Lethwei promotion
- Founded: August 2015
- Headquarters: Yangon, Myanmar
- Key people: Zay Thiha (Chairman); Sein Phyo Hlaing (Executive Director); Gerald Ng (CEO)
- Owner: Myanmar Lekkha Moun Co Ltd
- Website: www.wlc.com.mm

World Lethwei Championship (also known as WLC) was a Lethwei promotion based in Yangon, Myanmar. The promotion brought the millennia-old Burmese martial of Lethwei to UFC Fight Pass and showcased it to the world. The WLC events combined the historic traditions of Lethwei with modern entertainment.

== History ==
=== Formation ===
The success of ONE Championship's mixed martial arts events in Myanmar caught the eye of Zaykabar Company Vice-Chairman Zay Thiha, who decided to bring world-class Lethwei events the world. The businessman started Lekkha Moun Co in 2015 and the World Lethwei Championship was officially founded in August 2017 by Zay Thiha and investors, as a subsidiary of Lekkha Moun Co.

=== Inaugural event ===
In 2017, WLC signed Myanmar's top Lethwei fighters Tun Tun Min & Too Too. The first WLC event, titled WLC 1: The Great Beginning, was held on 3 March 2017 at Mingalardon Event Zone in Mingaladon Township, Yangon, Myanmar.

=== Signing Dave Leduc ===
In March 2019, the promotion announced that it had signed Lethwei superstar Dave Leduc to an exclusive contract. The exclusive contract would make it impossible for him to defend his various titles from other promotions. Leduc held a press conference at the Karaweik Palace in Yangon to announce that he was vacating three of his four Lethwei world titles and joining the promotion.

For Leduc's promotional debut at WLC 9: King of Nine Limbs, the WLC signed former UFC welterweight Seth Baczynski. Leduc knocked out Baczynski with punches to win the inaugural WLC Cruiserweight Championship. The event received a significant viewership success on UFC Fight Pass and won multiple awards in Asia such as the 2019 Best Sport Program at The Asian Academy Awards. Leduc received a $50,000 bonus for his performance and marketing efforts.

=== International expansion ===
In October 2019, while on The Joe Rogan Experience podcast, Dave Leduc announced that the organization had plans to host an historical event in the United States. At the pre-fight press conference for WLC 11: Battlebones, WLC executive director Sein Phyo Hlaing revealed plans to expand globally in 2020, beginning with Cambodia, Thailand, Japan and the United States. As the promotion expands internationally, it plans to sign even more free-agents with recognizable names to compete in Lethwei.

=== ONE Championship partnership ===
In October 2016, the WLC became one of ONE Championship’s partners at the occasion ONE: State of Warriors in Yangon, Myanmar. WLC Chairman Zay Thiha was inspired after witnessing the success ONE Championship in Myanmar which held total of three events in Yangon in 2015 and 2016. These events are said to be the inspiration behind WLC’s creation.

“ONE Championship proved that a world-class martial arts event can thrive in the country, and we believe we can replicate that with the national martial art of Lethwei,” "We believe we can elevate the sport and showcase Myanmar as a world-class sporting nation.” said Zay Thiha.

In 2017, the promotion showed interest in co-promoting events in order to expand globally and there was rumours the organization could co-promote with the US-based Bare Knuckle Fighting Championship (BKFC). However, the WLC officially entered into a partnership to share fighters with the mixed martial arts promotion ONE Championship. Both parties agreed on sending athletes to fight in each other's organization.

On June 30, 2017, in a collaboration between ONE and WLC, the organizations held a Lethwei dark match at ONE Championship: Light of a Nation, a contest between Soe Htet Oo and Thway Thit Win Hlaing. Soe Htet Oo would end up losing a decision according to WLC point system where a winner must be chosen by judges decision if the fight goes there is no stoppage. As of 2022, there has been rumours of WLC Champion Dave Leduc crossing over to ONE Championship under Lethwei rules.

=== Women division ===
In 2018, Cambodia's Nou Srey Pov became the first female winner in World Lethwei Championship, defeating Shwe Sin Min and Shwe Nadi.

In 2019, WLC announced it will commit to the female Lethwei division with a dedicated female match at every event. It held its first female fight after the announcement featuring France's Souris Manfredi and Eh Yanut from Cambodia at WLC 9: King of Nine Limbs on 2 August in Mandalay, Myanmar. Manfredi became the first winner of the newly created women's division by defeating Yanut.

=== Broadcast ===
Sky Net was the first television channel to broadcast the WLC events live in Myanmar and were then delayed telecast in over 40 countries worldwide. In 2018, WLC signed a broadcasting deal with international broadcaster Canal+ for exclusive broadcasting rights in Myanmar. The end of 2018, the WLC marked Lethwei history by signing a deal with the Ultimate Fighting Championship and having its first Lethwei event broadcast live on UFC Fight Pass. World Lethwei Championship was also available in over 100 countries through broadcast deals with Fight Network, Arena Sport, Fox Sports, Star Sports, Bayon Television, Titan Channel, Sport Extra and StarTimes.

== Events ==
#	Event	Date	Venue	Location
13	WLC 14: Lethwei Showcase	25 September 2020	Undisclosed location	Undisclosed location
12	WLC 12: Hideout Battle	28 August 2020	Undisclosed location	Undisclosed location
11	WLC 11: Battlebones	31 January 2020	Thein Pyu Stadium	Yangon, Myanmar
10	WLC 10: Fearless Tigers	4 October 2019	Mandalar Thiri Indoor Stadium	Mandalay, Myanmar
9	WLC 9: King of Nine Limbs	2 August 2019	Mandalar Thiri Indoor Stadium	Mandalay, Myanmar
8	WLC 8: Karen Spirit	5 May 2019	Chit Tu Myaing Park	Hpa-an, Myanmar
7	WLC 7: Mighty Warriors	22 February 2019	Mandalar Thiri Indoor Stadium	Mandalay, Myanmar
6	WLC 6: Heartless Tigers	29 September 2018	Thuwunna National Indoor Stadium	Yangon, Myanmar
5	WLC 5: Knockout War	2 June 2018	Wunna Theikdi Indoor Stadium	Naypitaw, Myanmar
4	WLC 4: Bareknuckle-King	17 February 2018	Wunna Theikdi Indoor Stadium	Naypitaw, Myanmar
3	WLC 3: Legendary Champions	4 November 2017	Thuwunna National Indoor Stadium	Yangon, Myanmar
2	WLC 2: Ancient Warriors	10 June 2017	Thuwunna National Indoor Stadium	Yangon, Myanmar
1	WLC 1: The Great Beginning	3 March 2017	Mingalardon Event Zone	Yangon, Myanmar

== Final champions ==
=== World Champions ===
Division	Champion	Event	Defenses
Cruiserweight	(Canada) Dave Leduc	August 2, 2019 (WLC 9: King of Nine Limbs)	0
Middleweight	(Uzbekistan) Naimjon Tuhtaboyev	January 31, 2020 (WLC 11: Battlebones)	0
Light Middleweight	(Ukraine) Sasha Moisa	August 2, 2019 (WLC 9: King of Nine Limbs)	0
Light Welterweight	(Portugal) Antonio Faria	February 22, 2019 (WLC 7: Mighty Warriors)	1
Women's Bantamweight	(France) Souris Manfredi	August 28, 2020 (WLC 12: Hideout Battle)	0

=== Myanmar National Champion ===
Division	Champion	Event
Light Welterweight	(Myanmar) Saw Htoo Aung	September 29, 2018 (WLC 6: Heartless Tigers)

=== World championship history ===
==== Cruiserweight Championship ====
Weight limit: 84 kg (185.2 lb)

No.	Name	Event	Date	Reign	Defenses
1	(Canada) Dave Leduc def. Seth Baczynski	WLC 9: King of Nine Limbs; Mandalay, Myanmar	August 2, 2019	542 days	

==== Middleweight Championship ====
Weight limit: 75 kg (165.3 lb)

No.	Name	Event	Date	Reign	Defenses
1	(Myanmar) Too Too def. Michael Badato	WLC 3: Legendary Champions; Yangon, Myanmar	November 4, 2017	818 days	1. def. Vasyl Sorokin at WLC 4 on February 17, 2018
2	(Uzbekistan) Naimjon Tuhtaboyev def. Too Too	WLC 11: Battlebones; Yangon, Myanmar	January 31, 2020	367 days	

==== Light Middleweight Championship ====
Weight limit: 71 kg (156.5 lb)

No.	Name	Event	Date	Reign	Defenses
1	(Poland) Artur Saladiak def. Saw Ba Oo	WLC 5: Knockout War; Naypitaw, Myanmar	June 2, 2018	426 days	
2	(Ukraine) Sasha Moisa def. Artur Saladiak	WLC 9: King of Nine Limbs; Mandalay, Myanmar	August 2, 2019	542 days	

==== Light Welterweight Championship ====
Weight limit: 63.5 kg (140.0 lb)

No.	Name	Event	Date	Reign	Defenses
1	(Portugal) Antonio Faria def. Saw Htoo Aung	WLC 7: Mighty Warriors; Mandalay, Myanmar	February 22, 2019	710 days	1. def. Francisco Vinuelas at WLC 14 on September 25, 2020

==== Women's Bantamweight Championship ====
Weight limit: 54 kg (119.0 lb)

No.	Name	Event	Date	Reign	Defenses
1	(France) Souris Manfredi def. Maisha Katz	WLC 12: Hideout Battle; Undisclosed location	August 28, 2020	157 days	

== Rules ==
The WLC uses the tournament rules established in 1996 by the MTLF.

=== Rounds ===
Each bout can be booked as a 3, 4 or 5 round fight with 3 minutes per round and a 2-minute break in between rounds. Championship bouts are 5 round fights with 3 minutes per round and a 2-minute break between rounds.

=== Judging ===
In the event that a bout goes the distance, it will go to the judges decision. The 3 judges will score the bout based on number of strikes per round. Fighters have a maximum of 3 knockdowns per round and 4 knockdowns in the entire fight before the fight is ruled a knockout.

=== Weight classes ===
Weight class name	Upper limit			Gender
Weight class name	in pounds (lb)	in kilograms (kg)	in stone (st)	Gender
Light Flyweight	105.8	48	7.6	Female
Flyweight	112.4	51	8	Male / Female
Bantamweight	119	54	8.5	Male / Female
Featherweight	125.7	57	9	Male / Female
Lightweight	132.3	60	9.4	Male / Female
Light Welterweight	140	63.5	10	Male / Female
Welterweight	147.7	67	10.5	Male
Light Middleweight	156.5	71	11.2	Male
Middleweight	165.3	75	11.8	Male
Light Heavyweight	174.2	79	12.4	Male
Cruiserweight	185.2	84	13.2	Male
Heavyweight	185.2+	84+	13.2+	Male

== Awards ==
- Lethwei World
  - 2019 Lethwei Promotion of the year
  - 2019 Event of the Year WLC 9
- Spia Asia Awards
  - 2019 Best Sport Tourism Destination Campaign of the Year - Bronze WLC 9
- Asian Academy Awards
  - 2019 Best Sport Program - National Winner WLC 9

== Notable fighters ==
- (Myanmar) Tun Tun Min
- (Canada) Dave Leduc
- (Myanmar) Too Too
- (Myanmar) Soe Lin Oo
- (Myanmar) Mite Yine
- (Myanmar) Saw Ba Oo
- (Ukraine) Sasha Moisa
- (Poland) Artur Saladiak
- (Uzbekistan) Naimjon Tuhtaboyev
- (Vietnam) Nguyễn Trần Duy Nhất
- (Uganda) Umar Semata
- (United States) Seth Baczynski

== See also ==
- Myanmar Traditional Lethwei Federation
- List of Lethwei fighters
