= Mite Yine =

Burmese Lethwei fighter

- Born: April 26, 1992 (age 34); Maungdaw, Rakhine State, Myanmar
- Native name: Saw Dar Pot စောဒါပို့
- Other names: Saw Mite Yine; Mite Yine Lay
- Nationality: Myanmar
- Height: 162 cm (5 ft 4 in)
- Weight: 57 kg (126 lb; 9.0 st)
- Stance: Orthodox
- Team: Shwe Phoo Club

Lethwei record
- Total: 73
- Wins: 43
- By knockout: 40
- Losses: 10
- By knockout: 9
- Draws: 20

Medal record

Men's Muay Thai

Representing Myanmar

Southeast Asian Games
Gold medal – first place	2013 Naypyidaw	54 kg

Mite Yine (Burmese: မိုက်ရိုင်း; born April 26, 1992) is a Burmese Lethwei fighter who competes in the World Lethwei Championship's Featherweight division. He is a former Lethwei Golden Belt champion, having won the title in 2015 and 2016.

Yine has also represented Myanmar in Muay Thai at the 2013 SEA Games and competitions at the 2013 Asian Indoor and Martial Arts Games, winning the gold medal.

== Lethwei career ==
On June 14, 2015, Mite Yine defeated Moe Hein by 3rd-round knockout to win the 2015 Lethwei Golden Belt Featherweight (57 kg) World Championship.

Mite Yine defeated Nat Khat Aung by decision on July 10, 2016 to win the 2016 Lethwei Golden Belt Featherweight World Championship.

=== World Lethwei Championship ===
On November 4, 2017, Mite Yine made his World Lethwei Championship debut at WLC 3: Legendary Champions, where he defeated Pha Kyaw Hae by unanimous decision.

On June 2, 2018, he lost to Antonio Faria by TKO at WLC 5: Knockout War.

On September 29, 2018, Mite Yine lost to Pich Mtes Khmang via split decision at WLC 6: Heartless Tigers.

In 2018, he competed as a mixed martial artist who in the Flyweight division of ONE Championship. Mite Yine would defeat Morn Samet by split decision at WLC 8: Karen Spirit.

On October 11, 2019, he defeated Nguyen Thanh Trung by unanimous decision at WLC 10: Fearless Tigers.

== Mixed martial arts career ==
=== ONE Championship ===
As part of World Lethwei Championship's partnership with ONE Championship, Mite Yine became one of many fighters shared between the two organizations. This also allowed him to participate in MMA-rules fights under the ONE Championship banner.

On June 29, 2018, Mite Yine won his mixed martial arts debut in ONE Championship's Flyweight division, defeating Saw Darwait in Yangon, Myanmar at ONE Championship: Spirit Of A Warrior. On October 26, 2018, Mite Yine lost to Ye Thway Ne by unanimous decision at ONE Championship: Pursuit of Greatness in Yangon.

== Muay Thai career ==
Mite Yine, competing under his real name of Saw Dar Pot, was one of six ethnic Karen boxers (including Saw Nga Man) selected as a representative of Myanmar in Muay Thai at the 2013 Southeast Asian Games held in Naypyidaw. At the SEA Games, he competed in the men's 54 kg category and defeated Phillip Delarmino of the Philippines to win the gold medal at 54 kg.

In addition to the Southeast Asian Games, Mite Yine has also competed in Muay Thai at the 2013 Asian Indoor and Martial Arts Games.

== Titles ==
- 2016 Lethwei Golden Belt – Featherweight World Champion
- 2015 Lethwei Golden Belt – Featherweight World Champion

== Lethwei record ==
Professional Lethwei record
43 Wins, 10 Losses, 20 Draws
Date	Result	Opponent	Event	Location	Method	Round	Time
2022-12-22	Draw	(Myanmar) Hein Tun Aung	Kyar Inn Challenge Fights	Hlaingbwe Township, Myanmar	Draw	5	3:00
2022-11-09	Draw	(Myanmar) Thway Lin Htet	67th Karen State Day	Hpa-an Township, Myanmar	Draw	5	3:00
2022-03-27	Loss	(Myanmar) Eh Mwi	Hlakazaing Challenge Fights	Hlaingbwe Township, Myanmar	TKO	3	
2022-02-14	Loss	(Myanmar) Ye Thway Ni	Lethwei Challenge Fight	Kyain Seikgyi Township, Myanmar	TKO	2	
2022-02-02	Win	(Thailand) Suphabnoi Sor.Jor.Piek-Uthai	Myanmar vs. Thailand Challenge Fights	Myawaddy Township, Myanmar	KO	2	
2022-01-03	Win	(Myanmar) Pat Kyaw Lin Naing	Taung Ka Lay New Year Challenge Fights	Hpa-an Township, Myanmar	TKO	3	
2021-11-07	Draw	(Myanmar) Pat Kyaw Lin Naing	66th Karen State Day	Hpa-an Township, Myanmar	Draw	3	3:00
2021-02-12	Draw	(Myanmar) Pat Kyaw Lin Naing	74th Karen State Union Day	Hpa-an Township, Myanmar	Draw	3	3:00
2021-01-30	Draw	(Myanmar) Pat Kyaw Lin Naing	72nd Karen Revolution Day	Hpapun Township, Myanmar	Draw	3	3:00
2020-02-19	Draw	(Thailand) Suphabnoi Sor.Jor.Piek-Uthai	Myanmar vs. Thailand Challenge Fights	Myanmar	Draw	5	3:00
2020-02-08	Draw	(Myanmar) Ye Thway Ni	(194th) Annual Lighting Festival	Kyondoe, Myanmar	Draw	5	3:00
2019-12-26	Win	(Thailand) Yodsaenchai	Kyein Chaung Challenge Fights	Payathonzu, Myanmar	KO	3	
2019-11-27	Draw	(Thailand) Kaophodam Sujebamekieow	Myanmar vs. Thailand Challenge Fights	Myaing Gyi Ngu, Myanmar	Draw	5	3:00
2019-11-08	Win	(Thailand) Petchnarin Sathianmuaythai	64th Karen State Day	Hpa-an, Myanmar	KO	1	
2019-10-04	Win	(Vietnam) Nguyen Thanh Trung	WLC 10: Fearless Tigers	Mandalay, Myanmar	Decision (Unanimous)	5	3:00
2019-05-05	Win	(Cambodia) Morn Samet	WLC 8: Karen Spirit	Hpa-an, Myanmar	Decision (Split)	5	3:00
2019-02-19	Draw	(Thailand) Petcheak Kiattikosin	193rd Annual Lighting Festival	Kyondoe, Myanmar	Draw	5	3:00
2019-02-02	Win	(Thailand) Suea Sor.Bankru	Kyar-Inn village Challenge Fights	Hlaingbwe Township, Myanmar	KO	5	
2018-09-29	Loss	(Cambodia) Pich Mtes Khmang	WLC 6: Heartless Tigers	Yangon, Myanmar	Decision (Split)	5	3:00
2018-06-02	Loss	(Portugal) Antonio Faria	WLC 5: Knockout War	Naypyidaw, Myanmar	TKO	3	3:00
2018-04-27	Draw	(Myanmar) Ye Thway Ni	Me Sa Meik Challenge Fights	Hlaingbwe Township, Myanmar	Draw	5	3:00
2018-02-25	Win	(Myanmar) Saw Darwait	Thai-Myanmar Challenge Fights	Kawkareik Township, Myanmar	KO	2	
2018-01-31	Loss	(Thailand) Phu Thai	International Challenge Fights	Ye Township, Myanmar	KO	3	
2018-01-10	Win	(Myanmar) Shukleine Min	Win Sein Taw Ya	Mudon Township, Myanmar	KO	3	
2017-11-04	Win	(Myanmar) Pha Kyaw Hae	WLC 3: Legendary Champions	Yangon, Myanmar	Decision (Unanimous)	2	2:50
2017-10-08	Win	(Myanmar) Yan Naing Tun	GTG 5 Challenge Fights	Mandalay, Myanmar	TKO	3	
2017-06-25	Win	(Uzbekistan) Tolabaev Kobilbek	Lethwei Nation Fight	Yangon, Myanmar	KO	4	
2017-04-16	Draw	(Myanmar) Ye Thway Ni	Lunnya Challenge Fights	Hpa-an, Myanmar	Draw	5	3:00
2017-02-12	Draw	(Myanmar) Ye Thway Ni	Myanmar Traditional Lethwei Fight	Ye Township, Myanmar	Draw	5	3:00
2016-11-27	Draw	(Myanmar) Tun Lwin Moe	Mandalay Rumbling Challenge Fight	Yangon, Myanmar	Draw	5	3:00
2016-11-09	Draw	(Thailand) Kaophodam Sujebamekieow	61st Karen State Day	Hpa-an, Myanmar	Draw	5	3:00
2016-10-09	Loss	(Myanmar) Ye Thway Ni	GTG Myanmar Lethwei Fight 2016	Yangon, Myanmar	KO	2	
2016-07-10	Win	(Myanmar) Nat Khat Aung	2016 Golden Belt Lethwei Championship	Mandalay, Myanmar	Decision	5	3:00
Wins 2016 Golden Belt Lethwei 57kg Championship
2016-07-03	Win	(Myanmar) Moe Hein	2016 Golden Belt Lethwei Championship	Mandalay, Myanmar	TKO	2	
2016-02-23	Draw	(Laos) Koun Vong Sohpoan	Laos-Myanmar Challenge Fights	Ye Township, Myanmar	Draw	5	3:00
2015-11-14	Win	(Thailand) Phaisithong Kiatpraphat	(60th) Kayin State Day	Hpa-an, Myanmar	KO	2	
2015-09-27	Win	(Myanmar) Saw Hla Kyi Htoo	Mandalay Rumbling Mega Fights	Yangon, Myanmar	KO	2	
2015-06-14	Win	(Myanmar) Moe Hein	2015 Golden Belt Lethwei Championship	Yangon, Myanmar	KO	3	
Wins 2015 Golden Belt Lethwei 57kg Championship
2015-05-30	Win	(Myanmar) Jit Too	2015 Golden Belt Lethwei Championship	Yangon, Myanmar	TKO	2	
2015-04-03	Win	(Thailand) Phaisithong Kiatpraphat	Mon-Myanmar-Thai Challenge Fights	Ye Township, Myanmar	KO	3	
2014-07-06	Loss	(Thailand) Wanchana King of Muay Thai	One on One Big Fight	Yangon, Myanmar	KO	1	
2014-03-08	Win	(Thailand) Nuengpetch	Hlakazaing village Challenge Fights	Kyaikmaraw Township, Myanmar	KO	3	
Legend: Win Loss Draw/No contest Notes

== Mixed martial arts record ==
Professional record breakdown
2 matches	1 win	1 loss
By knockout	1	0
By decision	0	1

Res.	Record	Opponent	Method	Event	Date	Round	Time	Location	Notes
Loss	1–1	Ye Thway Ni	Decision (unanimous)	ONE: Pursuit of Greatness	October 26, 2018	3	5:00	Yangon, Myanmar	Flyweight debut.
Win	1–0	Saw Darwait	TKO (punches)	ONE: Spirit of a Warrior	June 29, 2018	1	2:48	Yangon, Myanmar	Lightweight debut.
