= 2019 in World Lethwei Championship =

2019 in WLC

Information
- First date: February 22, 2019
- Last date: October 4, 2019

Events
- Total events: 4

Fights
- Total fights: 35

The year 2019 is the 3rd year in the history of the World Lethwei Championship, a Lethwei promotion based in Myanmar.

== List of events ==
#	Event	Date	Venue	Location	Attendance
1	WLC 7: Mighty Warriors	February 22, 2019	Mandalar Thiri Indoor Stadium	Mandalay, Myanmar	
2	WLC 8: Karen Spirit	May 5, 2019	Chit Tu Myaing Park	(Myanmar) Hpa-an, Kayin State	
3	WLC 9: King of Nine Limbs	August 2, 2019	Mandalar Thiri Indoor Stadium	Mandalay, Myanmar	
4	WLC 10: Fearless Tigers	October 4, 2019	Mandalar Thiri Indoor Stadium	Mandalay, Myanmar	

== WLC 7: Mighty Warriors ==
WLC 7: Mighty Warriors
- Promotion: World Lethwei Championship
- Date: February 22, 2019
- Venue: Mandalar Thiri Indoor Stadium
- City: Mandalay, Myanmar

Event chronology
WLC 6: Heartless Tigers	WLC 7: Mighty Warriors	WLC 8: Karen Spirit

WLC 7: Mighty Warriors was a Lethwei event held by World Lethwei Championship on February 22, 2019 at the Mandalar Thiri Indoor Stadium in Mandalay, Myanmar's 2nd largest city.

=== Background ===
The event was the first in Lethwei history to be broadcast internationally on UFC Fight Pass. Newly signed to the WLC, Vietnamese ONE Championship fighter Nguyễn Trần Duy Nhất made his debut and defeated Cambodia's fighting star Pich Mtes Khmang who was at his second Lethwei appearance. The co-main event featured Myanmar fighter Shwe Yar Mann who had an incredible year 2018 where he went undefeated in 10 fights. He took on Ukrainian Sasha Moisa who also had an amazing year winning two multi-men tournaments in Thailand. In the main event, the recently crowned Light Welterweight Myanmar National Champion Saw Htoo Aung faced Portugal's Antonio Faria for a chance to trade his silver belt for an opportunity at the gold belt. Faria had already won two fights in World Lethwei Championship and was moving up a weight class for this bout. The event crowned the first Light Welterweight World Lethwei Champion when Faria won by 2nd-round knockout over Saw Htoo Aung.

=== Results ===
WLC 7: Mighty Warriors
Weight Class				Method	Round	Time	Notes
Light Welterweight 63.5 kg	(Portugal) Antonio Faria	def.	(Myanmar) Saw Htoo Aung	TKO (Retirement)	3	2:00	For the Light Welterweight World Lethwei Championship
Light Middleweight 71 kg	(Ukraine) Sasha Moisa	def.	(Myanmar) Shwe Yar Mann	KO (Punches)	3	1:40	
Welterweight 67 kg	(Myanmar) Yan Naing Tun	def.	(Myanmar) Saw Ba Oo	Decision (Unanimous)	5	3:00	
Lightweight 60 kg	(Vietnam) Nguyễn Trần Duy Nhất	def.	(Cambodia) Pich Mtes Khmang	KO (Head Kick and Punch)	1	2:13	
Lightweight 60 kg	(Myanmar) Htoo Nay Thu	def.	(Myanmar) Daung Phyu	Decision (Unanimous)	5	3:00	
Light Welterweight 63.5 kg	(Myanmar) Saw Min Min	def.	(Myanmar) Saw Darwait	Decision (Unanimous)	5	3:00	
Lightweight 60 kg	(Myanmar) Tun Min Naing	def.	(Myanmar) Saw Thar Nge	Decision (Split)	5	3:00	

== WLC 8: Karen Spirit ==
WLC 8: Karen Spirit
- Promotion: World Lethwei Championship
- Date: May 5, 2019
- Venue: Chit Tu Myaing Park
- City: Hpa-an, Myanmar

Event chronology
WLC 7: Mighty Warriors	WLC 8: Karen Spirit	WLC 9: King of Nine Limbs

WLC 8: Karen Spirit was a Lethwei event held by World Lethwei Championship on May 5, 2019 at the Chit Tu Myaing Park in Hpa-an, Myanmar.

=== Background ===
The event was the first major Lethwei event held in Kayin State The Kayin State is the epicentre for Lethwei culture. The sport is practiced in all of Myanmar, but it is held in higher regard among the Kayin, one of the 135 ethnic groups in Myanmar. The WLC brought the modern Lethwei rules for the first time to the State. In the main event, Mite Yine returned to action against Cambodia's Morn Samet who stepped up as a late replacement for Shahmarzade Amil. Myanmar's National Champion Kyaw Zin Latt replaced Soe Lin Oo in the co-main event against the Muay Thai star from Germany, Burutlek Petchyindee Academy. Injuries had hounded the headline fighters at the event, which prompting a re-shuffle of the card. Mite Yine who is a native son of Kayin, won the gold at 2013 SEA Games and won the coveted Lethwei Golden Belt twice. The sole women's match was between ethnic Karen Naw Phaw Law Eh and Vietnam's Huynh Ha Huu Hieu. Naw Phaw Law Eh also known as 'Eh Eh' previously won gold medals SEA Games in judo and a bronze in a regional wrestling competition. Thway Thit Aung faced Tiger Muaythai's David McCarthy from Ireland. Mite Yine won by split decision.

=== Results ===
WLC 8: Karen Spirit
Weight Class				Method	Round	Time	Notes
Featherweight 57 kg	(Myanmar) Mite Yine	def.	(Cambodia) Morn Samet	Decision (Split)	5	3:00	
Welterweight 67 kg	(Germany) Burutlek Petchyindee Academy	def.	(Myanmar) Kyaw Zin Latt	KO (Punch)	1	2:23	
Welterweight 67 kg	(Myanmar) Thway Thit Aung	def.	(Republic of Ireland) David McCarthy	Decision (Unanimous)	5	3:00	
Light Welterweight 63.5 kg	(Myanmar) Saw Min Min	def.	(Myanmar) Aung Aung Htoo	TKO (Corner Stoppage)	3	3:00	
W.Light Flyweight 48 kg	(Vietnam) Huynh Ha Huu Hieu	def.	(Myanmar) Eh Eh	Decision (Unanimous)	3	3:00	
Light Welterweight 63.5 kg	(Myanmar) Thway Thit Maung	def.	(Myanmar) Aung Hein	Decision (Unanimous)	5	3:00	
Lightweight 60 kg	(Myanmar) Hein Tun Aung	def.	(Myanmar) Than Zaw	KO (Headbutt)	4	1:23	
Welterweight 67 kg	(Myanmar) Ba Hein	def.	(Myanmar) Min Htet Kyaw	KO (Kick to the Body)	3	2:43	

== WLC 9: King of Nine Limbs ==
WLC 9: King of Nine Limbs
- Promotion: World Lethwei Championship
- Date: August 2, 2019
- Venue: Mandalar Thiri Indoor Stadium
- City: Mandalay, Myanmar

Event chronology
WLC 8: Karen Spirit	WLC 9: King of Nine Limbs	WLC 10: Fearless Tigers

WLC 9: King of Nine Limbs was a Lethwei event held on August 2, 2019 at the Mandalar Thiri Indoor Stadium in Mandalay, Myanmar.

=== Background ===
In March 2019, the WLC announced that it had signed undefeated Lethwei world champion Dave Leduc to an exclusive contract. For Leduc's debut, the promotion signed former TUF competitor and UFC welterweight Seth Baczynski. Baczynski felt confident leading up to the fight because he had more fighting experience than Leduc. The bout was for the inaugural Cruiserweight World Lethwei Championship. In the co-main event, incumbent Light Middleweight World Lethwei Champion Artur Saladiak faced Ukrainian Champion Sasha Moisa. Moisa became the rightful challenger to the title after the strong statement he made in his Lethwei debut knocking out Myanmar star Shwe Yar Man at WLC 7. During the fight, Moisa swarmed Saladiak with precise right hands and dropped Saladiak on several occasions, winning the Light Middleweight title in a unanimous decision victory. The event also featured France's Souris Manfredi and Eh Yanut from Cambodia and Manfredi became the first winner in the newly created women's division by defeated against Eh Yanut. In the main event, Dave Leduc landed a solid elbow which exploded Bacynski's left ear. He then knocked out Baczynski with punches to win the inaugural Cruiserweight World Lethwei Championship.

=== Fight Card ===
WLC 9: King of Nine Limbs
Weight Class				Method	Round	Time	Notes
Cruiserweight 84 kg	(Canada) Dave Leduc	def.	(United States) Seth Baczynski	TKO (4 Knockdown Rule)	2	2:04	For the Cruiserweight World Lethwei Championship
Light Middleweight 71 kg	(Ukraine) Sasha Moisa	def.	(Poland) Artur Saladiak	Decision (Unanimous)	5	3:00	For the Light Middleweight World Lethwei Championship
W.Bantamweight 54 kg	(France) Souris Manfredi	def.	(Cambodia) Eh Yanut	Decision (Unanimous)	3	3:00	
Lightweight 60 kg	(Vietnam) Nguyễn Trần Duy Nhất	def.	(Malaysia) Izat Zaki	Decision (Unanimous)	5	3:00	
Light Welterweight 63.5 kg	(Myanmar) Hein Tun Aung	def.	(Myanmar) Linn Htet Aung	Decision (Unanimous)	5	3:00	
Bantamweight 54 kg	(Myanmar) Aung Paing	def.	(Myanmar) Paing Thet Aung	Decision (Unanimous)	4	3:00	
Welterweight 67 kg	(Myanmar) Saw Lin Lin	def.	(Myanmar) Saw El Kaluu	Decision (Split)	4	3:00	

== WLC 10: Fearless Tigers ==
WLC 10: Fearless Tigers
- Promotion: World Lethwei Championship
- Date: October 4, 2019
- Venue: Mandalar Thiri Indoor Stadium
- City: Mandalay, Myanmar

Event chronology
WLC 9: King of Nine Limbs	WLC 10: Fearless Tigers	WLC 11: Battlebones

WLC 10: Fearless Tigers was a Lethwei event held on October 4, 2019 in Mandalay, Myanmar.

=== Background ===
This event was done in partnership with the Mandalay-based Lethwei promotion Great Tiger Group, who promoted five bouts after the live international broadcast on UFC Fight Pass. The main event for the international broadcast featured Lethwei World's 2019 breakthrough fighter Thway Thit Win Hlaing against Thai-German Muaythai champion Burutlek Petchyindee Academy, both previously undefeated in World Lethwei Championship. Thway Thit Win Hlaing has been on a winning streak by defeating Saw Ba Oo, Shwe Yar Mann and Shan Ko in the first three WLC events, before taking a brief hiatus. Burutlek Petchyindee Academy made an instant impact in the world of lethwei when he knocked out former light welterweight champion Kyaw Zin Latt with one punch in his debut. That impressive performance has won him a date against Thway Thit Win Hlaing. In the co-main event, Nicola Barke was making her Lethwei debut against Bianka Balajt from Hungary which she won by unanimous decision. In the main event, Thway Thit Win Hlaing landed an overhand right to knockout Burutlek Petchyindee Academy to continue his undefeated streak.

=== Fight Card ===
WLC 10: Fearless Tigers
Weight Class				Method	Round	Time	Notes
Light Middleweight 71 kg	(Myanmar) Phyan Thwe	def.	(Myanmar) Shwe Yar Mann	Knockout	4		Lethwei Challenge Fight (Not on international broadcast)
Welterweight 67 kg	(Myanmar) Tha Pyay Nyo	def.	(Myanmar) Yan Naing Tun	Draw	5	3:00	Lethwei Challenge Fight (Not on international broadcast)
Light Welterweight 63.5 kg	(Myanmar) Ye Thway Ne	def.	(Myanmar) Saw Min Min	Draw	5	3:00	Lethwei Challenge Fight (Not on international broadcast)
Light Welterweight 63.5 kg	(Myanmar) Lwan Chai	def.	(Myanmar) Htoo Nay Thu	Draw	5	3:00	Lethwei Challenge Fight (Not on international broadcast)
Lightweight 60 kg	(Myanmar) Kyaw Swar Win	def.	(Myanmar) Pat Kyaw Lin Naing	Draw	5	3:00	Lethwei Challenge Fight (Not on international broadcast)
Light Middleweight 71 kg	(Myanmar) Thway Thit Win Hlaing	def.	(Germany) Burutlek Petchyindee Academy	Knockout	2	2:21	
Light Welterweight 63.5 kg	(Myanmar) Nicola Barke	def.	(Hungary) Bianka Balajti	Decision (Unanimous)	3	3:00	
Featherweight 57 kg	(Myanmar) Mite Yine	def.	(Vietnam) Nguyen Thanh Trung	Decision (Unanimous)	5	3:00	
Light Welterweight 63.5 kg	(Cambodia) Elite Peakday	def.	(Myanmar) Shuklaine Min	Decision (Split)	5	3:00	
Light Welterweight 63.5 kg	(Myanmar) Thway Thit Maung	def.	(Morocco) Omar Elouers	Decision (Unanimous)	5	3:00	
Lightweight 60 kg	(Myanmar) Auk Chin Lay	def.	(Myanmar) Hein Tun Aung	Decision (Split)	5	3:00	
Light Welterweight 63.5 kg	(Myanmar) Saw Kaung Htet	def.	(Myanmar) Saw Min Naing	Decision (Unanimous)	5	3:00	
Bantamweight 54 kg	(Myanmar) Soe Win Than	def.	(Myanmar) Thein Soe	Knockout	1	0:31	Preliminary fight. Not on international broadcast.

== See also ==
- ILFJ
- World Lethwei Federation
