= Artur Saladiak =

Polish kickboxer

Artur Saładiak
- Born: March 15, 1991 (age 35); Mirosławiec, Poland
- Nationality: (Poland) Polish
- Height: 1.82 m (5 ft 11 1/2 in)
- Weight: 71 kg (157 lb; 11 st)
- Division: Lightweight; Light middleweight Middleweight
- Style: Muay Thai, kickboxing, Lethwei
- Fighting out of: Somerset, England
- Team: FSC Muay Thai
- Trainer: Sonny Perez

Kickboxing record
- Total: 34
- Wins: 22
- Losses: 10
- Draws: 2

Artur Saładiak (born March 15, 1991) is a Polish Muay Thai kickboxer and Lethwei fighter. He competed in Glory and World Lethwei Championship where he is the former WLC Light Middleweight World Champion.

== Career ==
=== Kickboxing ===
Fighting out of FSC Muay Thai in Exeter, Saladiak began his Muay Thai career on the British scene, competing for events like Infinity Full On and Total Takedown.

On September 11, 2016, Saladiak had his first big break when he appeared on THAI FIGHT London facing French Muaythai star Antoine Pinto. He lost the fight by decision after three rounds.

On September 22, 2017, he faced Youssef Boughanem at Phoenix 3 London, where he lost via third-round technical knockout.

On August 22, 2021, Saladiak faced Alex MacGregor at Lion Fight 68 on short notice. He lost by unanimous decision.

On October 12, 2019, Saladiak made his Glory debut at Glory 69: Düsseldorf. Facing Vlad Tuinov, he lost via a three-round unanimous decision.

He returned to Glory at Glory 75: Utrecht on February 29, 2020, where he faced Gueric Billet. In a fight that saw him get knocked down, Saladiak went on to lose via unanimous decision.

== Lethwei ==
Saladiak made his Lethwei debut on June 10, 2017, at WLC 2: Ancient Warriors. He defeated Soe Lin Oo of Myanmar by unanimous decision. Saladiak is featured in the Netflix documentary series FightWorld in the episode titled "Myanmar: Crossroads", which is centered around Lethwei.

On June 2, 2018, Saladiak fought Saw Ba Oo at WLC 5: Knockout War for the inaugural WLC Light Middleweight World Championship, knocking out the Burmese fighter in the fourth round to become the WLC World Champion.

In 2019, he made his first defense of the WLC Light Middleweight World Championship against up-and-coming Ukrainian fighter Sasha Moisa. On August 2, 2019, at WLC 9: King of Nine Limbs, Saladiak lost to Moisa by unanimous decision and failed to retain the WLC Light Middleweight World Championship.

On May 9, 2021, Saladiak defeated Filip Rządek by decision in a three-round bout under Lethwei rules at A1 Federation Gala 6. It was the first-ever Lethwei event held in Poland, sanctioned by the Polish Lethwei Federation and the World Lethwei Federation.

On January 1, 2022, Saladiak competed against Adam Trzpioła at WOTORE 4 in Poland. The rules of Wotore are reminiscent of the Vale Tudo tournaments of the 1990s or Lethwei since participants compete without gloves, and headbutts are legal. Saladiak won by TKO.

== Championships and accomplishments ==
=== Muay Thai ===
- K1 British 84 kg Champion
- ICO British 84 kg Champion
- 2015 Infinity Area 84 kg Champion
- Golden Belt British Muay Thai 72.5 kg Champion
- 2023 8 Limbs Champion

=== Lethwei ===
- World Lethwei Federation
  - WLF Lightweight Champion (one time; current)
- World Lethwei Championship
  - WLC Light Middleweight World Champion (one time)

== Lethwei record ==
Professional Lethwei record
5 wins, 1 loss, 1 draw
Date	Result	Opponent	Event	Location	Method	Round	Time
2023-08-07	Win	(Slovakia) Ivan Hatala	MFC 2: Apocalypse	Banská Bystrica, Slovakia	TKO	4	
Wins WLF Featherweight World Championship
2021-05-09	Win	(Poland) Filip Rządek	A1 Federation Gala 6	Pleszew, Poland	Decision	3	3:00
2019-08-02	Loss	(Ukraine) Sasha Moisa	WLC 9: King of Nine Limbs	Mandalay, Myanmar	Decision (unanimous)	5	3:00
Loss WLC Light Middleweight World Championship
2018-06-02	Win	(Myanmar) Saw Ba Oo	WLC 5: Knockout War	Naypyidaw, Myanmar	KO	4	1:00
Wins WLC Light Middleweight World Championship
2017-11-04	Win	(Romania) Alex Bublea	WLC 3: Legendary Champions	Yangon, Myanmar	Decision (unanimous)	5	3:00
2017-08-06	Draw	(Myanmar) Soe Lin Oo	Mandalay Rumbling Classic Fight	Mandalay, Myanmar	Draw	5	3:00
2017-06-10	Win	(Myanmar) Soe Lin Oo	WLC 2: Ancient Warriors	Yangon, Myanmar	Decision (unanimous)	5	3:00
Legend: Win Loss Draw/no contest Notes

== Muay Thai & kickboxing record ==
Muay Thai & kickboxing record
22 wins, 10 losses, 2 draws
Date	Result	Opponent	Event	Location	Method	Round	Time
2023-05-27	Win	(Spain) Mehdi Oulichiki	8 Limbs Fighting Championship	London, United Kingdom	Decision (unanimous)	3	3:00
Wins the 8 Limbs Championship title.
2021-11-27	Loss	(Romania) Alex Bublea	Roar Combat League 22	Runcorn, England	Decision (unanimous)	5	3:00
2021-08-22	Loss	(Scotland) Alex MacGregor	Lion Fight 68	Glasgow, Scotland	Decision (unanimous)	5	3:00
2020-02-29	Loss	(France) Guerric Billet	Glory 75: Utrecht	Utrecht, Netherlands	Decision (unanimous)	3	3:00
2019-11-09	Loss	(England) Jack Cooper	Muay Thai Grand Prix 30	London, United Kingdom	Decision (unanimous)	3	3:00
For the MTGP European super welterweight title.
2019-10-12	Loss	(Russia) Vlad Tuinov	Glory 69: Düsseldorf	Düsseldorf, Germany	Decision (unanimous)	3	3:00
2019-04-06	Win	(Greece) Giannis Skordilis	Kickboxing Grand Prix 18	London, United Kingdom	Decision (unanimous)	3	3:00
2018-03-10	Draw	(England) Matt Murdoch	Stand and Bang	United Kingdom	Decision	3	3:00
2017-09-22	Loss	(Morocco) Youssef Boughanem	Phoenix 3 London	London, United Kingdom	TKO	3	
For the Phoenix FC middleweight title.
2017-02-12	Loss	(England) Josh Turbill	Tanko Muay Thai League	Manchester, United Kingdom	Decision (unanimous)	5	3:00
2016-11-05	Win	(Norway) Ole Petter Nyback	Fight Nights	London, United Kingdom	TKO	1	
2016-09-11	Loss	(France) Antoine Pinto	THAI FIGHT London	London, United Kingdom	Decision	3	3:00
2016-07-11	Win	(England) Dilwyn Jones	The Tankō Main Event	United Kingdom	TKO	3	
2016-03-19	Win	(England) Jack Sampola	YOKKAO 17 & 18	Bolton, United Kingdom	TKO	1	
2015-06-20	Win	(Poland) Tomasz Czernicki	Infinity Full On: Fired Up	London, United Kingdom	KO	2	
2015-03-28	Win	(England) Dan Dunn	Total Takedown	United Kingdom	Decision	3	3:00
2015-02-28	Win	(England) Dan Curtain	Infinity Full On: Reloaded	London, United Kingdom	KO	1	
Wins the Infinity Area 84kg title.
2014-11-01	Loss	(England) Oli Skarlot	Gala K1	United Kingdom	Decision	3	3:00
Legend: Win Loss Draw/no contest Notes

== See also ==
- List of male kickboxers

Awards and achievements
New championship	1st WLC Light Middleweight World Champion; 2 June 2018 – August 2, 2019	Succeeded by Sasha Moisa
