= 2020 in World Lethwei Championship =

2020 in WLC

Information
- First date: January 31, 2020

The year 2020 is the 4th year in the history of the World Lethwei Championship, a Lethwei promotion based in Myanmar.

== List of events ==
#	Event	Date	Venue	Location	Attendance
1	WLC 11: Battebones	January 31, 2020	Thein Pyu Stadium	Yangon, Myanmar	
-	WLC 12: Khmer Kingdom	April 3, 2020	Cancelled due to the COVID-19 pandemic	Phnom Penh, Cambodia	
2	WLC 12: Hideout Battle	August 28, 2020	Undisclosed	Undisclosed location	
3	WLC 14: Lethwei Showcase	September 25, 2020	Undisclosed	Undisclosed location	

== WLC 11: Battlebones ==
WLC 11: Battlebones
- Promotion: World Lethwei Championship
- Date: January 31, 2020
- Venue: Thein Pyu Stadium
- City: Yangon, Myanmar

Event chronology
WLC 10: Fearless Tigers	WLC 11: Battlebones	WLC 12: Hideout Battle

WLC 11: Battlebones was a Lethwei event held by World Lethwei Championship on January 31, 2020 at the Thein Pyu Stadium in Yangon, Myanmar.

=== Background ===
This event featured a world title fight for the World Lethwei Middleweight Championship between the champion Too Too and the challenger Naimjon Tuhtaboyev of Uzbekistan. The event was streamed live on UFC Fight Pass.

=== Results ===
WLC 11: Battlebones
Weight Class				Method	Round	Time	Notes
Middleweight 75 kg	(Uzbekistan) Naimjon Tuhtaboyev	def.	(Myanmar) Too Too (c)	Decision (Split)	5	3:00	For the Middleweight World Lethwei Championship
Bantamweight 54 kg	(Myanmar) Somiong Luktupfah	def.	(Cambodia) Sok Rith	KO (Kick To The Body)	2	1:31	
W.Bantamweight 54 kg	(France) Souris Manfredi	def.	(Vietnam) Tran Thi Lua	KO (Punch)	2	1:51	
Welterweight 67 kg	(Italy) Samuel Toscano	def.	(Myanmar) Saw Kaung Htet	Decision (Unanimous)	5	3:00	
Lightweight 60 kg	(Myanmar) Hein Tun Aung	def.	(Cambodia) Em Sothy	Decision (Unanimous)	5	3:00	
Welterweight 67 kg	(Myanmar) Saw Hla Min	def.	(Myanmar) Tun Lin Aung	TKO (Doctor Stoppage)	2	0:46	
Welterweight 67 kg	(Myanmar) Eh Mwe	def.	(Myanmar) Thar Win Tun	KO (Kick To The Body)	5	1:47	
Lightweight 60 kg	(Myanmar) Lin Htet Naing	def.	(Myanmar) Zin Bo	Decision (Unanimous)	5	3:00	

== WLC 12: Hideout Battle ==
WLC 12: Hideout Battle
- Promotion: World Lethwei Championship
- Date: August 28, 2020
- Venue: Undisclosed
- City: Undisclosed

Event chronology
WLC 11: Battlebones	WLC 12: Hideout Battle	WLC 14: Lethwei Showcase

WLC 12: Hideout Battle was a Lethwei event held by World Lethwei Championship on August 28, 2020 in an undisclosed location.

=== Background ===
This event was the first for the organization following the COVID-19 pandemic. France's Souris Manfredi took on Spain's Maisha Katz, with the winner making history as the Women's Bantamweight World Lethwei Champion, the first female lethwei world champion in World Lethwei Championship.

=== Results ===
WLC 12: Hideout Battle
Weight Class				Method	Round	Time	Notes
W.Bantamweight 54 kg	(France) Souris Manfredi	def.	(Spain) Maisha Katz	TKO (Retirement)	4	3:00	For the inaugural Women’s Bantamweight World Lethwei Championship
Bantamweight 54 kg	(Myanmar) Somiong Luktupfah	def.	(Uzbekistan) Artur Te	Decision (Split)	5	3:00	
Middleweight 75 kg	(Germany) Kristof Kirsch	def.	(Switzerland) Gligor Stojanov	Decision (Unanimous)	5	3:00	
Bantamweight 54 kg	(Algeria) Nabil Anane	def.	(Myanmar) Saw Phoe Khwar	Decision (Unanimous)	5	3:00	
Light Welterweight 63.5 kg	(Kyrgyzstan) Sherzod Kabutov	def.	(Myanmar) Nakha	Decision (Unanimous)	5	3:00	
Welterweight 67 kg	(Belgium) Omar Mahir	def.	(Georgia (country)) Tophik Abdullaev	KO (Punch and Knee)	1	1:24	
Featherweight 57 kg	(Mongolia) Myagmasuren Borkhuu	def.	(Uzbekistan) Nur Mohammad	TKO (Leg Injury)	4	2:20	

== WLC 14: Lethwei Showcase ==
WLC 14: Lethwei Showcase
- Promotion: World Lethwei Championship
- Date: September 25, 2020
- Venue: Undisclosed
- City: Undisclosed

Event chronology
WLC 14: Lethwei Showcase	N/A

WLC 14: Lethwei Showcase was a Lethwei event held by World Lethwei Championship on September 25, 2020 in an undisclosed location. In the main event, Light Welterweight World Lethwei Champion Antonio Faria defended his title against Spanish challenger Francisco Jose Vinuelas. Faria retained his title via TKO at the hand of the third round when Vinuelas was unable to continue.

=== Results ===
WLC 14: Lethwei Showcase
Weight Class				Method	Round	Time	Notes
Light Welterweight 63.5 kg	(Portugal) António Faria (c)	def.	(Spain) Francisco Jose Vinuelas	TKO (Retirement)	3	3:00	For the Light Welterweight World Lethwei Championship
Middleweight 75 kg	(Spain) Nico Mendes	def.	(Thailand) Saensuek	KO (Knee)	1	1:30	
Light Middleweight 71 kg	(Brazil) Leehaney Henrique	def.	(Russia) Vladimir Shulyak	Decision (Unanimous)	5	3:00	
Light Welterweight 63.5 kg	(Argentina) Yoel Paique	def.	(Myanmar) Saw Hla Min	KO (Leg Kicks)	2	0:37	
Bantamweight 54 kg	(Myanmar) Pha Kyaw Hae	-	(Thailand) Bandasak	Draw	5	3:00	
W.Bantamweight 54 kg	(Italy) Miriam Sabot	def.	(Thailand) Petchnaree	TKO (Retirement)	2	3:00	
Bantamweight 54 kg	(Morocco) Ayoub Elamghari	def.	(Myanmar) Jay Chay	Decision (Split)	5	3:00	
