= 2018 in World Lethwei Championship =

2018 in WLC

Information
- First date: February 17, 2018
- Last date: September 29, 2018

Events
- Total events: 3

Fights
- Total fights: 22

The year 2018 is the 2nd year in the history of the World Lethwei Championship, a Lethwei promotion based in Myanmar.

== List of events ==
#	Event	Date	Venue	Location	Attendance
1	WLC 4: Bareknuckle-King	February 17, 2018	Wunna Theikdi Indoor Stadium	Naypitaw, Myanmar	
2	WLC 5: Knockout War	June 2, 2018	Wunna Theikdi Indoor Stadium	Naypitaw, Myanmar	
3	WLC 6: Heartless Tigers	September 29, 2018	Thuwunna Stadium	Yangon, Myanmar	

== WLC 4: Bareknuckle-King ==
WLC 4: Bareknuckle-King
- Promotion: World Lethwei Championship
- Date: February 17, 2018
- Venue: Wunna Theikdi Indoor Stadium
- City: Naypitaw, Myanmar

Event chronology
WLC 3: Legendary Champions	WLC 4: Bareknuckle-King	WLC 5: Knockout War

WLC 4: Bareknuckle-King was a Lethwei event held on February 17, 2018 Wunna Theikdi Indoor Stadium in Myanmar's capital, Naypitaw.

=== Background ===
This event marked the first title defence of middleweight Lethwei world champion Too Too. For the occasion, he faced Ukraine's Vasyl Sorokin, who was one of the fastest rising stars in the world of kickboxing. Sorokin had already been in more than 20 major fights and had recently scored a victory over Thai superstar Sudsakorn Sor Klinmee to earn him the title shot. After 5 rounds, Too Too won by unanimous decision over Sorokin and retained his title.

=== Fight Card ===
WLC 4: Bareknuckle-King
Weight Class				Method	Round	Time	Notes
Middleweight 75 kg	(Myanmar) Too Too	def.	(Ukraine) Vasyl Sorokin	Decision (Unanimous)	5	3:00	For the Middleweight World Lethwei Championship
Welterweight 67 kg	(Myanmar) Saw Ba Oo	def.	(Myanmar) Tha Pyay Nyo	Decision (Unanimous)	5	3:00	
Light Welterweight 63.5 kg	(Myanmar) Kyaw Zin Latt	def.	(Myanmar) Ba Htoo Maung	Knockout	3		4-man Light Welterweight Myanmar National Championship
Light Welterweight 63.5 kg	(Myanmar) Saw Darwait	def.	(Myanmar) Pat Kyaw Lin Naing	Knockout	1		4-man Light Welterweight Myanmar National Championship
Featherweight 57 kg	(Cambodia) Nou Srey Pov	def.	(Myanmar) Shwe Sin Min	Decision (Unanimous)	3	3:00	
Lightweight 60 kg	(Myanmar) Chit Maung Maung	def.	(Myanmar) Sithu	Decision (Unanimous)	5	3:00	
Light Welterweight 63.5 kg	(Myanmar) Lethee Moe	def.	(Myanmar) Thway Thit Maung	Knockout	4		

== WLC 5: Knockout War ==
WLC 5: Knockout War
- Promotion: World Lethwei Championship
- Date: June 2, 2018
- Venue: Wunna Theikdi Indoor Stadium
- City: Naypitaw, Myanmar

Event chronology
WLC 4: Bareknuckle-King	WLC 5: Knockout War	WLC 6: Heartless Tigers

WLC 5: Knockout War was a Lethwei event held on June 2, 2018 in Wunna Theikdi Indoor Stadium in Naypitaw, Myanmar.

=== Background ===
Artur Saladiak and Saw Ba Oo contested the main event for the Light Middleweight World LethweiChampionship. Artur Saladiak defeated Saw Ba Oo by knockout to become the first Light Middleweight WLC Champion. Artur Saladiak is Britain's K-1 and Muay Thai champion, with a record of 16 wins, 5 losses and 1 draw. He has been in the Lethwei ring three times, twice with Myanmar's Soe Lin Oo, and once with Alex Bublea from Romania. Saladiak showed impressive Lethwei skills in these fights, grabbing a chance to challenge the WLC's light middleweight world title. Taungkalay Lethwei Club's tough warrior Saw Ba Oo, 28, is one of the toughest Lethwei fighters in Myanmar, with 18 wins, 20 draws and 5 losses. The winner will become the WLC's world Lethwei champion in the light middleweight category. Saw Ba Oo's teammate Saw Darwait will go up against Kyaw Zin Latt from the Nine Thaton Lethwei Club for WLC's light welterweight title.

=== Fight Card ===
WLC 5: Knockout War
Weight Class				Method	Round	Time	Notes
Light Middleweight 71 kg	(Poland) Artur Saladiak	def.	(Myanmar) Saw Ba Oo	Knockout	4	1:00	For the Light Middleweight World Lethwei Championship
Light Welterweight 63.5 kg	(Myanmar) Kyaw Zin Latt	def.	(Myanmar) Saw Darwait	Decision (Split)	5	3:00	For the Light Welterweight Myanmar National Championship
Super Middleweight 79 kg	(Myanmar) Saw Nga Man	def.	(Australia) Michael Badato	Decision (Split)	5	3:00	
Welterweight 67 kg	(Myanmar) Tha Pyay Nyo	def.	(Myanmar) Phoe La Pyae	Knockout	2	0:46	
Bantamweight 54 kg	(Cambodia) Nou Srey Pov	def.	(Myanmar) Shwe Nadi	Decision (Unanimous)	3	3:00	
Lightweight 60 kg	(Portugal) Antonio Faria	def.	(Myanmar) Mite Yine	TKO (Doctor Stoppage)	3	3:00	
Light Welterweight 63.5 kg	(Myanmar) Saw Htoo Aung	def.	(Myanmar) Lethee Moe	Decision (Unanimous)	5	3:00	

== WLC 6: Heartless Tigers ==
WLC 6: Heartless Tigers
- Promotion: World Lethwei Championship
- Date: September 29, 2018
- Venue: Thuwunna Stadium
- City: Yangon, Myanmar

Event chronology
WLC 5: Knockout War	WLC 6: Heartless Tigers	WLC 7: Mighty Warriors

WLC 6: Heartless Tigers was a Lethwei event held on September 29, 2018 at the Thuwunna Stadium in Yangon, Myanmar.

=== Background ===
This marked WLC's return in Yangon for the first time in 2018, after two events in Myanmar's capital. The event saw the debut of Kun Khmer star Roeung Sophorn who faced off against Myanmar's knockout artist Yan Naing Tun. With a record of 141 wins and 17 losses, the WLC signed Cambodian Sophorn in an attempt to bring the attention of millions of fans in his home country. Pich Mtes Khmang was also in action in a lightweight bout against Mite Yine. In the main event, Lethwei superstar Soe Lin Oo made his WLC return against Zhao Wen Wen of China. Soe Lin Oo defeated Zhao Wen Wen by knockout in the second round.

=== Fight Card ===
WLC 6: Heartless Tigers
Weight Class				Method	Round	Time	Notes
Welterweight 67 kg	(Myanmar) Soe Lin Oo	def.	(China) Zhao Wen Wen	Knockout	2	0:40	
Light Welterweight 63.5 kg	(Myanmar) Saw Htoo Aung	def.	(Myanmar) Kyaw Zin Latt	Knockout	1	2:59	For the Light Welterweight Myanmar National Championship
Welterweight 67 kg	(Myanmar) Yan Naing Tun	def.	(Cambodia) Roeung Sophorn	Knockout	3	2:59	
Welterweight 67 kg	(Myanmar) Tha Pyay Nyo	def.	(Uzbekistan) Sokhrukh Kholmurodov	TKO (Doctor Stoppage)	3	1:25	
Lightweight 60 kg	(Portugal) Antonio Faria	def.	(Vietnam) Nguyen Tang Quyen	Knockout	3	1:48	
Lightweight 60 kg	(Cambodia) Pich Mtes Khmang	def.	(Myanmar) Mite Yine	Decision (Split)	5	3:00	
Middleweight 75 kg	(Myanmar) Pite Htwe	def.	(Myanmar) San Thu Oo	Decision (Unanimous)	5	3:00	
Light Welterweight 63.5 kg	(Myanmar) Lethee Moe	def.	(Myanmar) Shuklaine Min	Decision (Unanimous)	5	3:00	

== See also ==
- 2018 in ILFJ
