= Soe Lin Oo =

Burmese Lethwei fighter

Saw Soe Lin Oo
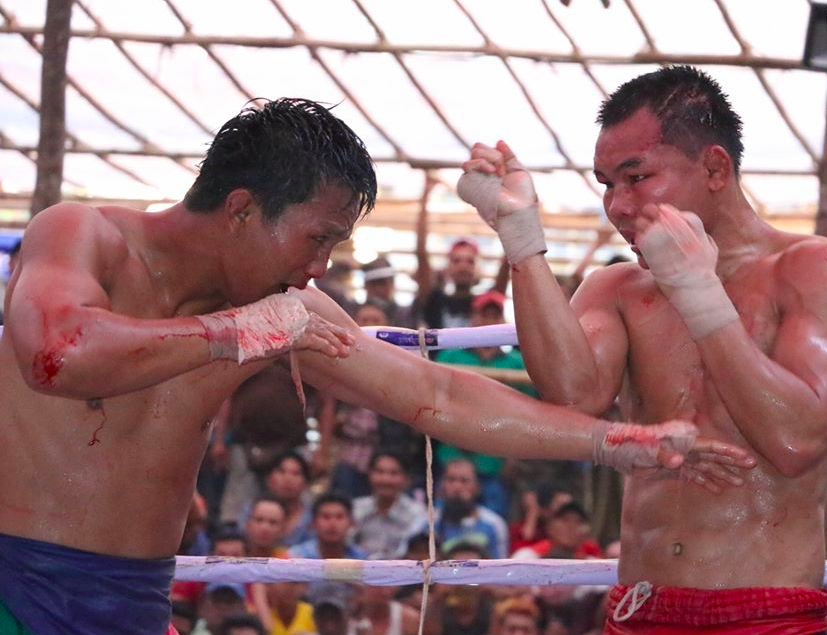
- Soe Lin Oo (right) fighting in Myanmar, February 2020
- Born: December 4, 1991 (age 34); Inn Shey village, Thaton District, Mon State, Myanmar
- Native name: စောစိုးလင်းဦး Saw Soe Lin Oo
- Other names: Man of Steel; Iron Man (သံမဏိ); Pae Poat (ပဲပုတ်)
- Nationality: Myanmar
- Height: 171 cm (5 ft 7 in)
- Weight: 65.5 kg (144 lb; 10.31 st)
- Division: Bantamweight
- Style: Lethwei
- Stance: Orthodox
- Team: Doe Yoe Yar Lethwei Club
- Trainer: Tin Aung, Dawna Myay Kyaw Soe

Other information
- Spouse: Naw Paw Khee Lar (Cecilia) (m. 2018)
- Children: 2
- Notable relatives: Thutti Aung (uncle)

Soe Lin Oo (Burmese: စိုးလင်းဦး) (born December 4, 1991) is a Karen,Burmese Lethwei fighter. He is the Golden Belt 60kg Lethwei world champion under traditional rules and currently competes in ONE Championship in the Bantamweight division.

== Early life ==
Soe Lin Oo is the son of U Kyaw Aye and Daw Nan Thaung Eain. He was born in Inn Shey village in Thaton Township, Mon State and is a member of the Karen ethnic group. Soe Lin Oo has stated that Shwe Du Wun was his role model.

== Career ==
=== Lethwei ===
Soe Lin Oo has often been called by the nicknames Man of Steel and Ironman due to his incredible pain threshold, which is a crucial aspect among today's Lethwei fighters.

In 2010, he won the Lethwei Golden Belt Championship in the 60kg division.

On June 10, 2017, Soe Lin Oo made his debut on World Lethwei Championship at WLC 2: Ancient Warriors, where he faced Artur Saladiak. He suffered his first career loss via judges decision to Saladiak.

On November 4, 2017, he made his second WLC appearance at WLC 3: Legendary Champions knocking out Ugandan Muay Thai fighter Umar Semata in the second round.

On August 5, 2018, Soe Lin Oo faced Muaythai World Champion Iquezang Kor.Rungthanakeat at Thein Pyu Stadium in Yangon. Soe Lin Oo knocked out Iquezang in the third round.

On September 29, 2018, Soe Lin Oo made his third WLC appearance at WLC 6: Heartless Tigers. He defeated Zhao Wen Wen by knockout in the second round.

On December 29, 2019, in a very anticipated match-up, Soe Lin Oo faced former WMC, YOKKAO, Lumpinee Stadium and Rajadamnern Stadium World Champion, Pakorn P.K. Saenchai Muaythaigym under Lethwei rules in Hpa-an, Karen state, Myanmar. Pakorn was extremely cautious in the clinch to avoid Soe Lin Oo's headbutts. In Round 4, while in the clinch, Soe Lin Oo floored Pakorn with a headbutt knockout and the Thai was not able to continue.

On August 14, 2022, Soe Lin Oo was set to compete at the Myanmar Lethwei World Championship (MLWC) at Thein Pyu Stadium in Yangon.

=== ONE Championship ===
On February 16, 2024, Soe Lin Oo made his ONE Championship debut against Masayoshi Tsuhashi at ONE Friday Fights 52. He won the fight by third-round technical knockout.

On March 29, 2024, Soe Lin Oo faced Fabio Reis at ONE Friday Fights 57 He won the fight by second-round knockout.

In 2024, the WBC Muaythai listed Soe Lin Oo as the number 13th ranked Welterweight in the world.

In this first fight of ONE contract, Soe Lin Oo faced Saeksan Or. Kwanmuang on January 24, 2025, at ONE 170. On December 2, it was announced that Soe injuries sustained in a car accident and the fight was initially cancelled. Soe has been medically cleared for competition and the bout stepped back into the original pairing. At the weigh-ins, Soe weighed in at 142.5 pounds, 0.5 pounds over the 142 pounds limit and he was fined 20 percent his purse which went to Saeksan. He lost the fight via unanimous decision.

Soe faced Dmitrii Kovtun on March 8, 2025, at ONE Fight Night 29. At the weigh-ins, Soe weighed in at 147.25 pounds, 2.25 pounds over the bantamweight limit and he was fined 20% of purse, which went to Kovtun. He lost the fight via unanimous decision.

On August 1, 2025, Soe Lin Oo will face Liam Harrison at ONE 173 at Ball Arena in Denver, Colorado. In 2019, Harrison said that he “would fight anyone in Lethwei rules with no training camp”. Lethwei world champion Dave Leduc offered to give $10,000 USD to a charity in Myanmar if Liam Harrison would to fight Soe Lin Oo in a Lethwei fight at World Lethwei Championship but the fight never materialized.

== Filmography ==
Year	Title	Role	Notes
2017	FightWorld	Himself	Episode 3 Myanmar: Crossroads

== Titles and accomplishments ==
=== Championships ===
- Lethwei
  - 2018 Most knockouts Award (trophy)
  - 2011 Dagon Shwe Aung Lan winner (special)
  - 2010 Golden Belt Champion (60kg)
  - 2010 Royal Club sponsored challenge fight belt
  - 2010 Dagon Shwe Aung Lan winner (2nd class)
- Muay Thai
  - ONE Championship
    - Performance of the Night (one time) vs. Masayoshi Tsuhashi
  - Southeast Asian Games
    - (bronze) 2013 Southeast Asian Games (63,5kg) – Naypyidaw, Myanmar

=== Awards ===
- Lethwei World
  - 2019 Male fighter of the year

== Muay Thai record ==
Muay Thai record
3 wins (3 (T)KOs), 4 losses, 0 draws
Date	Result	Opponent	Event	Location	Method	Round	Time
2026-01-23	Loss	(Thailand) Worapon Lukjaoporongtom	ONE Friday Fights 139, Lumpinee Stadium	Bangkok, Thailand	KO (head kick)	1	1:27
2025-03-08	Loss	(Russia) Dmitrii Kovtun	ONE Fight Night 29	Bangkok, Thailand	Decision (unanimous)	3	3:00
2025-01-24	Loss	(Thailand) Saeksan Or. Kwanmuang	ONE 170	Bangkok, Thailand	Decision (unanimous)	3	3:00
2024-09-27	Loss	(Thailand) Nabil Anane	ONE Friday Fights 81, Lumpinee Stadium	Bangkok, Thailand	Decision (unanimous)	3	3:00
2024-07-05	Win	(Thailand) Pongsiri P.K.Saenchaimuaythaigym	ONE Friday Fights 69, Lumpinee Stadium	Bangkok, Thailand	KO (right uppercut)	2	0:49
2024-03-29	Win	(Portugal) Fabio Reis	ONE Friday Fights 57, Lumpinee Stadium	Bangkok, Thailand	KO (straight left)	2	1:42
2024-02-16	Win	(Japan) Masayoshi Tsuhashi	ONE Friday Fights 52, Lumpinee Stadium	Bangkok, Thailand	TKO (punches)	3	2:40
Legend: Win Loss Draw/no contest Notes

== Lethwei record ==
Professional Lethwei record
126 fights, 71 wins (68 (T)KOs), 3 losses, 52 draws
Date	Result	Opponent	Event	Location	Method	Round	Time
2024-04-15	Draw	(Thailand) Fahphayap Kwaitonggym	Myanmar vs. Thailand Challenge Fights	Myawaddy, Myanmar	Draw	5	3:00
2024-01-11	Win	(Thailand) Sorgraw Petchyindee Academy	Karen National New Year Challenge Fights	Myawaddy, Myanmar	TKO	3	
2023-04-16	Win	(Thailand) Fahsura Khunkhao Phayayom	Myanmar vs. Thailand Challenge Fights	Myawaddy, Myanmar	TKO	5	
2022-11-27	Loss	(Myanmar) Thway Thit Win Hlaing	The Great Lethwei 1	Yangon, Myanmar	Decision (unanimous)	5	3:00
2022-08-14	Draw	(Thailand) Payak Samui	Myanmar Lethwei World Championship 2022	Yangon, Myanmar	Draw	5	3:00
2022-04-09	Draw	(Myanmar) Shuklaine Min	Moe Palae Commemoration, Myaing Ka Lay	Hpa-an Township, Myanmar	Draw	3	3:00
2022-02-02	Win	(Thailand) Fahphayap Kwaitonggym	Myanmar vs. Thailand Challenge Fights	Myawaddy, Myanmar	KO	4	1:53
2022-01-02	Draw	(Myanmar) Thway Thit Win Hlaing	27th Myainggyingu Karen New Year Challenge Fights	Myaing Gyi Ngu, Hpa-an District, Myanmar	Draw	3	3:00
2020-02-22	Draw	(Myanmar) Yan Naing Tun	Pa Nga Lethwei Challenge Fights	Thanbyuzayat Township, Myanmar	Draw	5	3:00
2020-02-08	Win	(Thailand) Kompetch Fairtex	Myanmar vs. Thailand Challenge Fights	Myanmar	KO (headbutt)	4	
2020-01-19	Draw	(Thailand) Pongsiri P.K.Saenchaimuaythaigym	Win Sein Taw Ya 2020	Mudon Township, Myanmar	Draw	5	3:00
2019-12-29	Win	(Thailand) Pakorn P.K. Saenchai Muaythaigym	Myanmar vs. Thailand Challenge Fights	Hpa-an, Myanmar	KO (headbutt)	3	
2019-12-21	Win	(Thailand) Pongsaklek BCK Gym	Myanmar vs. Thailand Challenge Fights	Myawaddy, Myanmar	KO	3	
2019-11-27	Draw	(Thailand) Fahphayap Kwaitonggym	Myanmar vs. Thailand Challenge Fights	Myaing Gyi Ngu, Myanmar	Draw	5	3:00
2019-11-03	Win	(Myanmar) Shwe Yar Man	Air KBZ Fight 2019	Yangon, Myanmar	KO (right knee to the head)	5	2:59
2019-09-12	Draw	(Myanmar) Soe Maung Oo	Lethwei Challenge Fights	Mandalay, Myanmar	Draw	5	3:00
2019-04-19	Loss	(Myanmar) Shwe Yar Man	Mon-Myanmar Challenge Fights	Ye Township, Myanmar	TKO (doctor stoppage)	5	2:07
2019-03-20	Draw	(Thailand) Klasuek Sitjakla	Mon-Myanmar-Thailand Challenge Fights	Lamaing, Ye, Myanmar	Draw	5	3:00
2019-02-20	Draw	(Iran) Reza Ahmadnezhad	International Challenge Fights	Ye, Mon State, Myanmar	Draw	5	3:00
2019-01-31	Draw	(Thailand) Avatar Tor.Morsri	Win Sein Taw Ya 2019	Mudon Township, Myanmar	Draw	5	3:00
2018-12-21	Win	(Thailand) Erawan Sor.Chitlada	DKBA 24th Anniversary Event	Myawaddy Township, Myanmar	KO (punches)	4	
2018-11-18	Draw	(Thailand) Sankom Sangmanee Gym	Lethwei Nation Fight 9	Yangon, Myanmar	Draw	5	3:00
2018-10-14	Win	(Thailand) Fahsura Wor.Petchpoon	AH-GA Champions Challenge Fight	Yangon, Myanmar	KO (referee stoppage)	3	
2018-09-29	Win	(China) Zhao Wen Wen	WLC 6: Heartless Tigers	Yangon, Myanmar	KO (right cross)	2	0:40
2018-08-05	Win	(Thailand) Iquezang Kor.Rungthanakeat	Lethwei Nation 50th Media Championship 2018	Yangon, Myanmar	KO	3	2:22
2018-06-23	Draw	(Thailand) Singmanee Kaewsamrit	Myanmar Lethwei Fight	Mandalay, Myanmar	Draw	5	3:00
2018-05-20	Win	(Thailand) Pravit Sakmuangtalang	Myanmar vs. Thailand Friendship Challenge Fights	Myawaddy Township, Myanmar	KO	1	
2018-04-08	Draw	(Thailand) Payak Samui	Myanmar vs. Thailand Challenge Fights	Yangon, Myanmar	Draw	5	3:00
2018-02-21	Win	(Japan) Hareruya	Lethwei in Japan 7: Yuki	Tokyo, Japan	KO	2	0:32
2018-01-26	Win	(Thailand) Naruto Sathianmuaythai	Giant Fight Myanmar	Mandalay, Myanmar	KO (referee stoppage)	4	
2018-01-12	Draw	(Thailand) Payak Samui	Win Sein Taw Ya 2018	Mudon Township, Myanmar	Draw	5	3:00
2017-12-19	Win	(Thailand) Newwangjan Phran26	80th Kayin New Year Festival	Payathonzu, Myanmar	KO	2	0:47
2017-11-04	Win	(Uganda) Umar Semata	WLC 3: Legendary Champions	Yangon, Myanmar	KO (right cross)	2	1:14
2017-08-06	Draw	(Poland) Artur Saladiak	Mandalay Rumbling Classic Fight	Mandalay, Myanmar	Draw	5	3:00
2017-06-10	Loss	(Poland) Artur Saladiak	WLC 2: Ancient Warriors	Yangon, Myanmar	Decision (unanimous)	5	3:00
2017-05-14	Win	(Thailand) Pravit Aor.Piriyapinyo	Myanmar vs. Thailand Challenge Fights	Bilin, Mon State, Myanmar	KO	2	
2017-04-11	Win	(Thailand) Trakoonsing Tor.Jatuten	Myanmar vs. Thailand Challenge Fights	Ye Township, Myanmar	KO	4	
2017-03-26	Draw	(Myanmar) Phyan Thway	Clash of Lethwei Tiger 4 (GTG)	Yangon, Myanmar	Draw	5	3:00
2017-02-12	Win	(Thailand) Petrung Sudsakorn	Myanmar vs. Thailand Challenge Fights	Ye Township, Myanmar	KO (right uppercut)	4	
2017-01-23	Win	(Thailand) Sanrit Suranaree Gym	Myanmar Traditional Lethwei Fight	Mudon Township, Myanmar	KO (right hook)	3	
2016-12-29	Win	(Thailand) Fahsura Sor.Sor.Nawat	25th Karen New Year Anniversary	Hpa-an, Myanmar	KO	3	
2016-12-21	Win	(Thailand) Bawsan	22nd DKBA Anniversary	Myawaddy Township, Myanmar	KO	1	
2016-12-04	Win	(Thailand) Petrung Sudsakorn	Myanmar-Laos-Thailand Challenge Fights	Yangon, Myanmar	KO (doctor stoppage)	2	
2016-10-27	Draw	(Myanmar) Too Too	Lethwei Grand Prix in Japan 2016	Tokyo, Japan	Draw	5	3:00
2016-10-09	Draw	(Myanmar) Tha Pyay Nyo	GTG International Challenge Fights 2016	Yangon, Myanmar	Draw	5	3:00
2016-06-26	Win	(Thailand) Tawanchai Sor.Pattana	Guest Fight on Golden Belt 2016	Yangon, Myanmar	KO (slam)	2	2:46
2016-05-22	Draw	(Myanmar) Tha Pyay Nyo	Lethwei Challenge Fights	Bilin, Mon State, Myanmar	Draw	5	3:00
2016-04-22	Draw	(Myanmar) Tha Pyay Nyo	Lethwei Challenge Fights	Ye Township, Myanmar	Draw	5	3:00
2016-03-23	Draw	(Myanmar) Saw Gaw Mu Do	Lethwei Challenge Fights	Ye Township, Myanmar	Draw	5	3:00
2016-02-23	Loss	(Spain) Aitor Javier Alonso	Myanmar Lethwei Fight	Ye Township, Myanmar	KO (right uppercut)	3	
2016-01-14	Draw	(Myanmar) Tha Pyay Nyo	Karen New Year 2755, Taung Ka Lay	Hpa-an Township, Myanmar	Draw	5	3:00
2015-12-21	Win	(Thailand) Petchchuechip (Tanee Khomgrich)	DKBA 21st Anniversary, Sone See Myaing	Hpa-an, Myanmar	KO (punches and headbutt)	4	
2015-12-11	Win	(Thailand) Fachiang Sam	Brave Heart's Fight	Mandalay, Myanmar	KO (punches and knees)	3	
2015-11-14	Win	(Thailand) Petchpirun NK Fitnessmuaythai	(60th) Kayin State Day Anniversary	Hpa-an, Myanmar	KO	3	
2015-10-25	Draw	(Myanmar) Tha Pyay Nyo	Myanmar Ultimate Fight	Yangon, Myanmar	Draw	5	3:00
2015-10-11	Win	(Thailand) Orono Muangsima	Myanmar vs. Thailand Challenge Fights	Yangon, Myanmar	KO (punches)	1	1:26
2015-09-27	Draw	(Myanmar) Thway Thit Aung	Mandalay Rumbling Mega Fights	Mandalay, Myanmar	Draw	5	3:00
2015-04-25	Draw	(Myanmar) Saw Gaw Mu Do	Lethwei Challenge Fights	Mawlamyine, Myanmar	Draw	5	3:00
2015-04-13	Draw	(Thailand) Petchtae Tor.Maxmuaythai	Myanmar vs. Thailand Challenge Fights	Hpa-an, Myanmar	Draw	5	3:00
2015-03-25	Draw	(Myanmar) Too Too	Karoppi village Challenge Fights	Ye Township, Myanmar	Draw	5	3:00
2015-02-04	Draw	(Thailand) Jingreedtong Seatranferry	68th Mon National Day	Ye Township, Myanmar	Draw	5	3:00
2015-01-15	Win	(Switzerland) Gligor Stojanov	Win Sein Taw Ya 2015	Mudon Township, Mon State, Myanmar	KO (left cross)	3	0:39
2015-01-06	Win	(Thailand) Petchnikhom (Sankom)	Hnit Kayin Mon Myanmar-Thailand Challenge Fights	Ye Township, Mon State, Myanmar	KO	4	
2014-12-14	Win	(Italy) Calogero Palmeri	Ultimate Letwhay International Challenge Fight	Woodlands, Singapore	KO (right uppercut)	1	
2014-10-12	Win	(Thailand) Petsangnuan Luktupfah	Myanmar vs. Thailand Challenge Fights	Yangon, Myanmar	KO	1	1:30
2014-07-06	Draw	(Thailand) Pravit Aor.Piriyapinyo	Myanmar vs. Thailand Challenge Fights	Yangon, Myanmar	Draw	5	3:00
2014-06-01	Draw	(Myanmar) Too Too	Lethwei Challenge Fights	Yangon, Myanmar	Draw	5	3:00
2014-05-13	Draw	(Myanmar) Yan Gyi Aung	Lethwei Challenge Fights	Bilin, Mon State, Myanmar	Draw	5	3:00
2014-03-31	Win	(Thailand) Yothin	Hangan village Challenge Fights	Ye Township, Myanmar	KO		
2014-02-15	Win	(Thailand) Yodpetchaek Petchcharoen	(67th) Mon National Day	Thaung Pyin, Mon State, Myanmar	KO	4	2:24
2014-01-25	Win	(Thailand) Yodpetchaek Petchcharoen	Win Sein Taw Ya 2014	Mudon Township, Mon State, Myanmar	KO (right cross)	3	2:00
2014-01-20	Win	(Thailand) Kru Chain	Myanmar vs. Thailand Challenge Fights	Hpa-an Township, Myanmar	KO	3	
2014-01-15	Win	(Myanmar) Win Tun	(62nd) Kayah State Day	Loikaw, Myanmar	KO (headbutt)	4	
2013-12-30	Win	(Thailand) Torkeb Sor.Kamsing	Karen New Year 2753, Challenge Fights	Shwe Kokko, Myawaddy Township, Myanmar	KO	3	
2013-05-12	Draw	(Myanmar) Tun Tun Min	Lethwei Challenge Fights	Yangon, Myanmar	Draw	5	3:00
2013-04-25	Draw	(Myanmar) Tun Tun Min	Lethwei Challenge Fights	Thaung Pyin, Mon State, Myanmar	Draw	5	3:00
2013-03-26	Draw	(Myanmar) Tway Ma Shaung	Lethwei Challenge Fights	Lamaing, Ye, Mon State, Myanmar	Draw	5	3:00
2013-02-25	Win	(Myanmar) Win Tun	Lethwei Challenge Fights	Ye Township, Myanmar	KO (headbutt)	3	
2013-02-03	Win	(Myanmar) Saw Yan Paing	Lethwei Challenge Fights	Ye Township, Myanmar	KO	3	
2012-11-25	Draw	(Myanmar) Phoe K	Lethwei Challenge Fights	Yangon, Myanmar	Draw	5	3:00
2012-09-23	Draw	(Myanmar) Phoe K	Lethwei Challenge Fights	Mandalay, Myanmar	Draw	5	3:00
2012-08-12	Draw	(Myanmar) Tway Ma Shaung	Lethwei Challenge Fights	Yangon, Myanmar	Draw	5	3:00
2012-06-10	Win	(Thailand) Khamsua	Myanmar vs. Thailand Challenge Fights	Yangon, Myanmar	KO (referee stoppage)	2	
2012-02	Win	(Myanmar) Shwe Min Yarzar	Thaung Pyin Challenge Fights	Ye Township, Myanmar	KO	4	
2012-01	Draw	(Myanmar) Tway Ma Shaung	Hnit Kayin Lethwei Challenge Fights	Ye Township, Myanmar	Draw	5	3:00
2011-12-18	Draw	(Thailand) Mangkonthong	4th Dagon Shwe Aung Lan Championship Semi-Final	Mandalay, Myanmar	Draw	5	3:00
2011-11-09	Draw	(Myanmar) Win Tin	(56th) Kayin State Day	Myanmar	Draw	5	3:00
2011-11-03	Draw	(Iran) Masood Izadi	International Challenge Fights	Mandalay, Myanmar	Draw	5	3:00
2011-08-13	Win	(Japan) Motohiro Shinohara	Myanmar vs. Japan Goodwill Letwhay Competition	Yangon, Myanmar	KO (right elbow)	5	1:44
2011-07-02	Win	(Thailand) Arkhon	Myanmar vs. Thailand Challenge Fights	Yangon, Myanmar	KO (right cross)	4	2:14
2011	Draw	(Myanmar) Sit Thway	Lethwei Challenge Fights	Mon State, Myanmar	Draw	5	3:00
2011-03-16	Draw	(Thailand) Torkeb Sor.Khamsing	Mon-Myanmar-Kayin-Thai Challenge Fights, Htin Yu village	Thanbyuzayat Township, Mon State, Myanmar	Draw	3	3:00
Match stopped due to excessive rainfall
2011	Win	(Myanmar) Lone Chaw Lay	Royal Club Challenge Fights	Mawlamyine, Myanmar	KO	2	
2011	Win	(Thailand) Torkeb Sor.Khamsing	Myanmar vs. Thailand Challenge Fights	Kayin State, Myanmar	KO	2	
2011	Draw	(Myanmar) Tun Tun Min	Lethwei Challenge Fights	Myanmar	Draw	5	3:00
2011-01-16	Win	(Myanmar) Dawna Aung	3rd Dagon Shwe Aung Lan Championship Final	Yangon, Myanmar	Decision	5	3:00
2010-12-19	Win	(Myanmar) Aung Zeya	3rd Dagon Shwe Aung Lan Championship Semi-Final	Yangon, Myanmar	KO	3	
2010-11-21	Draw	(Myanmar) Mite Tine San	Lethwei Challenge Fights, Kaytumadi Indoor Stadium	Taungoo, Myanmar	Draw	5	3:00
2010-10-27	Draw	(Myanmar) Aung Zeya	Kyaikkhami Yele Pagoda Festival	Kyaikkhami, Myanmar	Draw	5	3:00
2010-09-26	Draw	(Thailand) Muengkaew	Myanmar-USA-France-Thai Challenge Fights	Yangon, Myanmar	Draw	5	3:00
2010-08-29	Win	(Myanmar) Ka Nyaw Htoo	Golden Belt Championship 2010 Final	Yangon, Myanmar	KO	4	0:48
Wins 2010 Golden Belt at 60kg
2010-08-21	Win	(Myanmar) Bi Lat Myay Maung Maung	Golden Belt Championship 2010 Semi final	Yangon, Myanmar	KO	2	2:33
2010-08-15	Win	(Myanmar) Dawna Aung	Golden Belt Championship 2010 Quarter final	Yangon, Myanmar	Decision	5	3:00
2010-07-25	Draw	(Myanmar) Mite Tine San	Lethwei Challenge Fights	Yangon, Myanmar	Draw	5	3:00
2010-03-07	Win	(Thailand) Payaknoon Sithniwat	Myanmar vs. Thailand Goodwill Letwhay Competition	Yangon, Myanmar	KO	5	2:54
Wins 2010 Challenge Fight Belt
2010-01-24	Win	(Myanmar) Sit Thway	2nd Dagon Shwe Aung Lan Championship Final	Yangon, Myanmar	KO	2	1:55
2010-01-09	Win	(Myanmar) A Mae Thar	Win Sein Taw Ya 2010	Mudon Township, Myanmar	KO	2	0:29
2009-12-13	Win	(Myanmar) Lone Chaw Lay	2nd Dagon Shwe Aung Lan Championship Quarter final	Yangon, Myanmar	KO	3	2:29
2009-10-24	Draw	(Myanmar) Sit Thway	Myanmar vs. Thailand Challenge Fights	Yangon, Myanmar	Draw	5	3:00
2009-02-28	Draw	(Myanmar) Tha Pyay Nyo	Dagon Shwe Aung Lan Championship	Yangon, Myanmar	Draw	5	3:00
2009-02-06	Win	(Myanmar) Kyaw Khout	Lethwei Challenge Fights, Kandawgyi	Yangon, Myanmar	KO	2	1:23
2008-10-25	Win	(Myanmar) Win Thuya	Lethwei Challenge Fights	Monywa, Myanmar	KO	1	
2008-09-14	Win	(Myanmar) Zaw Heik	Lethwei Challenge Fights	Yangon, Myanmar	KO	2	
2007-12-23	Draw	(Myanmar) Thoe Htein	Lethwei Challenge Fights	Yangon, Myanmar	Draw	4	3:00
Legend: Win Loss Draw/no contest Notes
