= Saw Ba Oo =

Burmese mixed martial arts (MMA) fighter and Lethwei fighter

- Born: Kale, Kayin State, Myanmar
- Native name: Saw Wunna Htay; Burmese: စောဝဏ္ဏဌေး
- Nationality: Burmese (Karen)
- Height: 170 cm (5 ft 7 in)
- Weight: 67 kg (148 lb; 11 st)
- Stance: Orthodox
- Team: Taung Ka Lay Club

Saw Ba Oo (Burmese: စောဘဦး) is a Burmese Lethwei fighter and mixed martial artist. He is signed to the World Lethwei Championship and ONE Championship's Lightweight division.

== Lethwei record ==
Professional Lethwei record
19 wins, 8 losses, 24 draws
Date	Result	Opponent	Event	Location	Method	Round	Time
2019-03-12	Draw	(Myanmar) Tha Pyay Nyo	Lethwei Challenge Fights	Ye Township, Mon State, Myanmar	Draw	5	3:00
2019-02-22	Loss	(Myanmar) Yan Naing Tun	WLC 7: Mighty Warriors	Mandalay, Myanmar	Decision (unanimous)	5	3:00
2019-02-04	Loss	(Thailand) Pakaw Dabphong	Myanmar vs. Thailand Challenge Fights	Hlaingbwe Township, Kayin State, Myanmar	KO	4	
2018-06-02	Loss	(Poland) Artur Saladiak	WLC 5: Knockout War	Naypyidaw, Myanmar	KO	4	1:00
2018-02-17	Win	(Myanmar) Tha Pyay Nyo	WLC 4: Bareknuckle-King	Naypyidaw, Myanmar	Decision (unanimous)	5	3:00
2017-03-03	Loss	(Myanmar) Thway Thit Win Hlaing	WLC 1: The Great Beginning	Yangon, Myanmar	Decision (unanimous)	5	3:00
2015-04-11	Loss	(Myanmar) Kyar Pauk	Thuwunna Stadium	Yangon, Myanmar	TKO	4	
Legend: Win Loss Draw/no contest Notes

== Mixed martial arts record ==
Professional record breakdown
4 matches	2 wins	2 losses
By knockout	2	1
By decision	0	1

Res.	Record	Opponent	Method	Event	Date	Round	Time	Location	Notes
Loss	2–2	Phoe Thaw	Decision (split)	ONE: Hero's Dream	November 3, 2017	3	5:00	Yangon, Myanmar	
Win	2–1	Kyal Sin Phyo	TKO (doctor stoppage)	ONE: State of Warriors	October 7, 2016	2	2:32	Yangon, Myanmar	
Loss	1–1	Thway Thit Aung	KO (punch)	ONE: Kingdom of Warriors	July 18, 2015	1	2:25	Yangon, Myanmar	ONE Myanmar Lightweight Tournament Final.
Win	1–0	Dawna Aung	TKO (elbow and punches)	ONE: Kingdom of Warriors	July 18, 2015	1	4:03	Yangon, Myanmar	ONE Myanmar Lightweight Tournament Semifinal.
