= Nguyễn Trần Duy Nhất =

Vietnamese, Muay Thai and Lethwei fighter

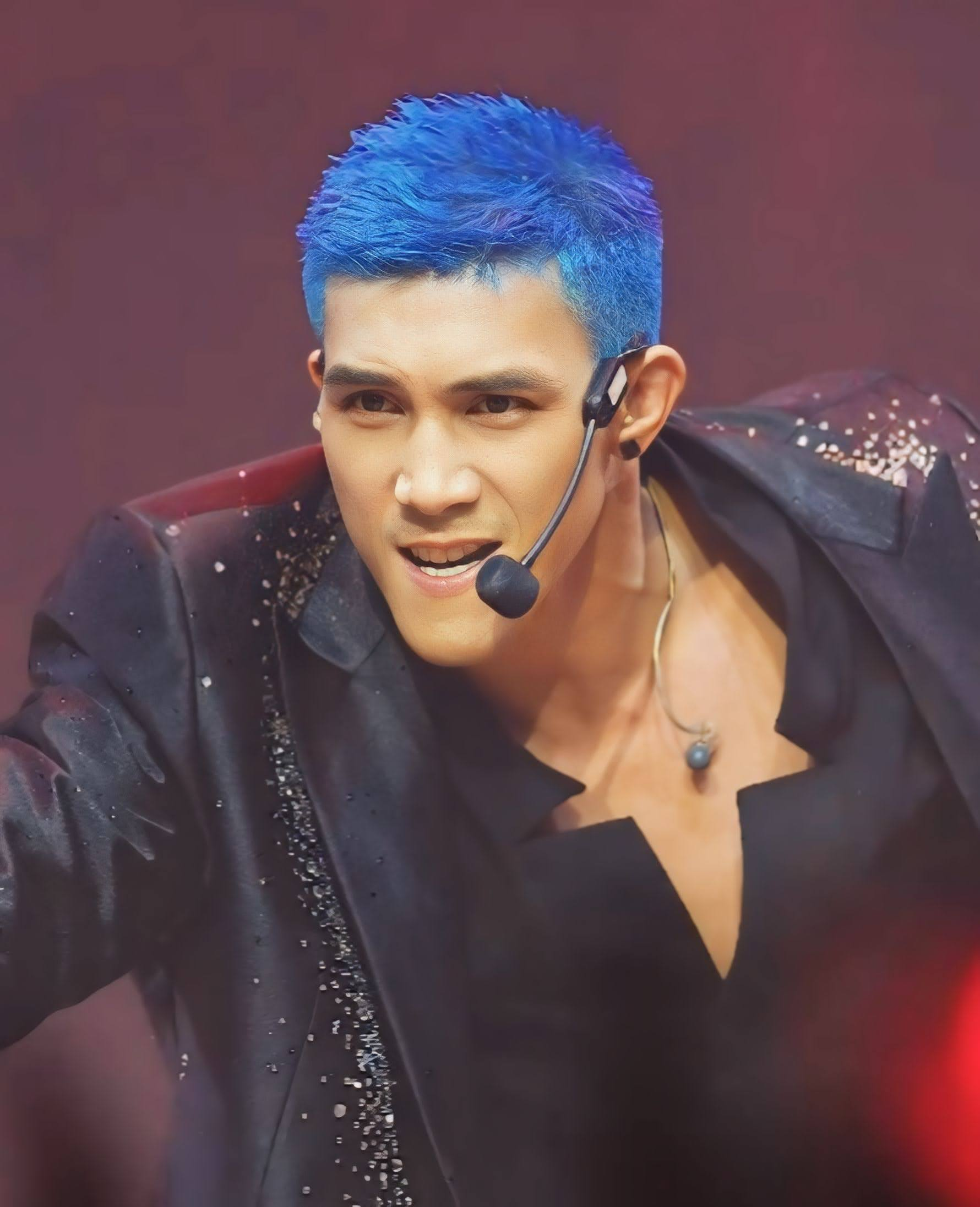
- Nguyễn Trần Duy Nhất in 2020
- Born: March 21, 1989 (age 37); Nha Trang, Khánh Hòa, Vietnam
- Other names: No. 1, Cường 1
- Nationality: (Vietnam) Vietnamese
- Height: 167 cm (5 ft 5 1/2 in)
- Weight: 61 kg (134 lb; 9.6 st)
- Division: Lightweight; Featherweight
- Style: Muay Thai, Lethwei, Tấn Gia Quyền
- Fighting out of: Ho Chi Minh City, Vietnam
- Team: No.1 Muay Club

Kickboxing record
- Total: 20
- Wins: 15
- Losses: 4
- Draws: 1

Mixed martial arts record
- Total: 4
- Wins: 4
- By knockout: 2
- By submission: 1
- By decision: 1
- Losses: 0

Nguyễn Trần Duy Nhất (born March 21, 1989) is a Vietnamese martial artist that has competed professionally in mixed martial artist, Muay Thai and Lethwei. He previously competed in Muay Thai on ONE Championship and in Lethwei on World Lethwei Championship.

Duy Nhất is a five-time WMF Muay Thai world champion and four-time SEA Games medalist in Muay Thai; in addition to having won medals at the IFMA World Muaythai Championships, Asian Indoor and Martial Arts Games, Asian Martial Arts Games, Asian Indoor Games, Asian Beach Games and World Games.

== Early life ==
Nguyễn Trần Duy Nhất was born in Nha Trang in the Khánh Hòa Province of Vietnam. He was then raised in Lam Dong in Vietnam's Central Highlands. Duy Nhất has one older sister and two younger brothers.

Being descended from the martial arts master who founded the Vietnamese martial art known as Tấn Gia Quyền, he began practicing martial arts from the age of 3. He then began competing in junior tournaments at the age of 14.

Duy Nhất discovered Muay Thai in 2007 when he left to study in Ho Chi Minh City. He first saw the martial art on the film Ong-Bak: Muay Thai Warrior.

== Martial arts career ==
=== Muay Thai ===
Nguyễn Trần Duy Nhất made his first Muay Thai appearance at the 2009 Asian Martial Arts Games, competing in the men's featherweight division (54–57 kg). He lost 0–5 to Thailand's Kittisak Boonsemsen in the final to win the featherweight silver medal.

Duy Nhất then participated in the 2009 Asian Indoor Games, once more in the men's featherweight division. He beat Weerapol Nonting of Thailand, 4–1, in the final to win Vietnam's only gold medal in Muay Thai.

He would then make his SEA Games debut at the 2009 Southeast Asian Games held in Vientiane. Competing in the men's featherweight category, he finished in second place to win the silver medal.

On July 2, 2013, Nguyễn Trần Duy Nhất would defeat Daniiar Kashkaraev of Kyrgyzstan, 5–0, to win the gold medal in the men's featherweight category in Muay Thai at the 2013 Asian Indoor and Martial Arts Games.

On October 24, 2015, Duy Nhất defeated Victor Pinto (younger brother of Antoine Pinto) at THAI FIGHT Vietnam by decision.

On September 23, 2017, Nguyễn Trần Duy Nhất fought at the inaugural Asia Fighting Championship event, where he defeated Huang Guang Wan by second-round technical knockout.

He appeared at Asia Fighting Championship again, this time fighting Zhao Zhan Shi on September 21, 2018. After three rounds, Duy Nhất was awarded the unanimous decision victory.

==== ONE Championship ====
Nguyễn Trần Duy Nhất made his ONE Championship debut at ONE Championship: Immortal Triumph on September 6, 2019. It was ONE's first event ever held in Vietnam and the first event to feature all-striking matches. He faced Azwan Che Wil of Malaysia, whom he knocked out in the third round.

On November 22, 2019, he faced Yuta Watanabe at ONE Championship: Edge Of Greatness, where he won with via second-round head kick knockout.

==== Muay Thai Grand Prix ====
On December 29, 2022, Nguyễn Trần Duy Nhất faced Anon Rachvicha at MTGP: The Home Coming. He defeated Rachvicha to win the MTGP 60 kg Silver Belt Championship.

==== Return to ONE ====
Nguyễn made his return to ONE Championship against Denis Purić at ONE Fight Night 17 on December 8, 2023. He lost the fight via knockout in the second round.

Nguyễn faced Johan Ghazali on June 8, 2024, at ONE 167. He won the fight via unanimous decision.

=== Mixed martial arts ===
==== Lion Championship ====
On September 18, 2022, Nguyễn Trần Duy Nhất faced Lê Văn Tuần in the quarter-finals of the Lion Championship 60 kg Tournament at Lion Championship 1, the first licensed MMA tournament in Vietnam. He won by second-round KO

On October 22, 2022, Duy Nhất faced Phan Huy Hoàng in the 60 kg tournament semi-finals at Lion Championship 2. He won by second-round TKO.

On November 26, 2022, Duy Nhất defeated Nguyễn Tiến Long by split decision in the 60 kg tournament final to win the Lion Championship 60 kg Tournament.

=== Lethwei ===
In 2019, Nguyễn Trần Duy Nhất signed to the World Lethwei Championship to start fighting in Lethwei.

On February 22, 2019, Duy Nhất made his lethwei debut at WLC 7: Mighty Warriors, where he defeated Pich Mtes Khmang by knockout at 2:13 of the first round.

On August 2, 2019, he returned to World Lethwei Championship at WLC 9: King of Nine Limbs, where he defeated Izat Zaki by unanimous decision.

== Titles ==
=== Muay Thai ===
==== Professional ====
- Muay Thai Grand Prix
  - 2022 MTGP Vietnam 60 kg Silver Belt Champion
- WPMF (World Muaythai Federation)
  - 5× WPMF Champion
- IPCC (International Professional Combat Council)
  - 2023 IPCC Muay Thai 60 kg Champion
- Uni Super Championship
  - 2018 Uni Super Championship Tournament Champion

==== Amateur ====
- World Games
  - (gold) 2022 World Games Muay Thai Men's 57 kg Gold Medalist
- Southeast Asian Games
  - (gold) 2021 SEA Games Muay Thai Men's 60 kg Gold Medalist
  - (bronze) 2017 SEA Games Muay Thai Men's 57kg Bronze Medalist
  - (bronze) 2013 SEA Games Muay Thai Men's 60kg Bronze Medalist
  - (silver) 2009 SEA Games Muay Thai Men's Featherweight Silver Medalist
- IFMA World Muaythai Championships
  - (bronze) 2019 IFMA World Muaythai Championships Men's 60kg Bronze Medalist
- Asian Beach Games
  - (gold) 2016 Asian Beach Games Muay Thai Men's Featherweight Gold Medalist
  - (gold) 2014 Asian Beach Games Muay Thai Men's Featherweight Gold Medalist
- Asian Indoor and Martial Arts Games
  - (gold) 2013 Asian Indoor and Martial Arts Games Men's Featherweight Gold Medalist
- Asian Martial Arts Games
  - (silver) 2009 Asian Martial Arts Games Men's Featherweight Silver Medalist

=== Mixed martial arts ===
- Lion Championship
  - 2022 Lion Championship 60 kg Tournament winner

== Mixed martial arts record ==
Professional record breakdown
3 matches	3 wins	0 losses
By knockout	2	0
By decision	1	0

Res.	Record	Opponent	Method	Event	Date	Round	Time	Location	Notes
Win	3–0	Nguyễn Tiến Long	Decision (split)	Lion Championship 3	November 26, 2022	5	5:00	Phú Quốc, Vietnam	Win the inaugural LC Bantamweight Championship.
Win	2–0	Phan Huy Hoàng	TKO (retirement)	Lion Championship 2	October 22, 2022	2	5:00	Hanoi, Vietnam	
Win	1–0	Lê Văn Tuần	TKO (punches)	Lion Championship 1	September 18, 2022	2	1:04	Ho Chi Minh City, Vietnam	Bantamweight debut.

== Lethwei record ==
Professional Lethwei Record
2 Wins, 0 Losses, 0 Draws
Date	Result	Opponent	Event	Location	Method	Round	Time
2019-08-02	Win	(Malaysia) Izat Zaki	WLC 9: King of Nine Limbs	Mandalay, Myanmar	Decision (unanimous)	5	3:00
2019-02-22	Win	(Cambodia) Pich Mtes Khmang	WLC 7: Mighty Warriors	Mandalay, Myanmar	KO	1	2:13
Legend: Win Loss Draw/No contest Notes

== Muaythai record ==
Professional Muaythai Record
15 Wins, 4 Losses, 1 Draw
Date	Result	Opponent	Event	Location	Method	Round	Time
2024-06-08	Win	(Malaysia) Johan Ghazali	ONE 167	Bangkok, Thailand	Decision (unanimous)	3	3:00
2023-12-08	Loss	(Bosnia and Herzegovina) Denis Purić	ONE Fight Night 17	Bangkok, Thailand	TKO (Left hook)	2	1:35
2023-10-14	Win	(Thailand) Chaiwat Sangnoi	All Star Fight 2023	Ho Chi Minh City, Vietnam	Decision	5	3:00
Wins the IPCC Muay Thai 60kg title
2022-29-12	Win	(Thailand) Anon Rachvicha	MTGP: The Home Coming	Ho Chi Minh City, Vietnam	Decision	3	3:00
Wins MTGP Vietnam 60kg Silver Belt Championship
2022-06-25	Loss	(Cambodia) Khim Bora	2022 in Town TV Cambodia: IPCC Kun Khmer	Svay Rieng, Cambodia	Unanimous Decision	3	3:00
2019-11-22	Win	(Japan) Yuta Watanabe	ONE Championship: Edge Of Greatness	Kallang, Singapore	KO (head kick)	2	0:30
2019-09-06	Win	(Malaysia) Azwan Che Wil	ONE Championship: Immortal Triumph	Ho Chi Minh City, Vietnam	KO (punch)	3	2:45
2019-08-17	Win	(Thailand) Sumata Khannonthan		Hanoi, Vietnam	Decision	3	3:00
2018-12-23	Win	(Thailand) Phimwong Kitti	Uni Super Championship	Ho Chi Minh City, Vietnam	Decision	3	3:00
Wins 2018 USC Tournament
2018-09-21	Win	(China) Zhao Zhan Shi	Asia Fighting Championship 2	Kuala Lumpur, Malaysia	Decision (unanimous)	3	3:00
2017-09-23	Win	(China) Huang Guang Wan	Asia Fighting Championship 1	Singapore	TKO (low kicks)	2	1:19
2016-12-05	Draw	(France) Arthur Meyer	King Rama 9 Memorial	Bangkok, Thailand	Decision	3	3:00
2015-10-24	Win	(France) Victor Pinto	THAI FIGHT Vietnam	Ho Chi Minh City, Vietnam	Decision	3	3:00
2012-03-21	Win	(Italy) Mathias Gallo Cassarino	WMF Pro-am World Championship Semifinal	Bangkok, Thailand	Decision	3	3:00
Legend: Win Loss Draw/No contest Notes

Amateur Muay Thai Record
Date	Result	Opponent	Event	Location	Method	Round	Time
2025-08-10	Loss	(France) Daren Rolland	2025 World Games, Bronze Medal fight	Chengdu, China	Decision (30:27)	3	3:00
For the 2025 World Games Muay Thai −57kg Bronze Medal.
2025-08-09	Loss	(Ukraine) Dmytro Shelesko	2025 World Games, Semifinals	Chengdu, China	Decision (29:28)	3	3:00
2025-08-08	Win	(China) Yang Yuxi	2025 World Games, Quarterfinals	Chengdu, China	Decision (30:27)	3	3:00
2022-07-17	Win	(Kazakhstan) Almaz Sarsembekov	IFMA at the 2022 World Games, Final	Birmingham, Alabama, United States	Decision (29:28)	3	3:00
Wins 2022 World Games -57kg Gold Medal.
2022-07-16	Win	(Ukraine) Vladyslav Mykytas	IFMA at the 2022 World Games, Semi Finals	Birmingham, Alabama, United States	Decision (29:28)	3	3:00
2022-07-15	Win	(Portugal) Rui Botelho	IFMA at the 2022 World Games, Quarter Finals	Birmingham, Alabama, United States	Decision (30:27)	3	3:00
2022-05-22	Win	(Thailand) Chonlawit Preedasak	IFMA at the 2021 Southeast Asian Games, Final	Hanoi, Vietnam			
Wins 2021 Southeast Asian Games -60kg Gold Medal.
2022-05-20	Win	(Philippines) Fritz Biagtan	IFMA at the 2021 Southeast Asian Games, Semi Final	Hanoi, Vietnam	Decision (30:27)	3	3:00
2021-12-07	Loss	(France) Florent Louis Joseph	2021 IFMA World Championships, Firs Round	Bangkok, Thailand	Decision (29:28)	3	3:00
2019-07-26	Loss	(Turkey) Sercan Koc	2019 IFMA World Championships, Semi Final	Bangkok, Thailand	Decision (30:27)	3	3:00
Wins 2019 IFMA World Championships -60kg Bronze Medal.
2019-07-25	Win	(Jordan) Saif Zakzook	2019 IFMA World Championships, Quarter Final	Bangkok, Thailand	Decision (30:27)	3	3:00
2019-07-24	Win	(Sweden) Kim Falk	2019 IFMA World Championships, Second Round	Bangkok, Thailand	RSCO	1	
2019-07-23	Win	(Kyrgyzstan) Argen Kerimbekov	2019 IFMA World Championships, First Round	Bangkok, Thailand	RSCO	1	
2019-04-30	Loss	(France) Lorenzo Sammartino	2019 Arafura Games, Semi Finals	Bangkok, Thailand	Decision (29:28)	3	3:00
Wins 2019 Arafura Games -63.5kg Bronze Medal.
2019-04-29	Win	(Australia) Lee Fook	2019 Arafura Games, Quarter Finals	Bangkok, Thailand	Decision (29:28)	3	3:00
2018-05-12	Loss	(Honduras) Elvin Cruz	2018 IFMA World Championships, First Round	Cancun, Mexico	DQ	1	
2017-08-28	Loss	(Thailand) Thachtana Luangphon	2017 SEA Games Muay Thai Tournamaent, Semifinals	Kuala Lumpur, Malaysia	Decision (30:27)	3	3:00
Wins 2017 SEA Games Muay Thai 57kg Bronze Medal.
2017-05-11	Win	(Turkey) Murat Arslan	2017 IFMA World Championships, Final	Minsk, Belarus	Decision (30:27)	3	3:00
Wins 2017 IFMA World Championships -60kg Gold Medal.
2017-05-10	Win	(Belarus) Artsem Vinnik	2017 IFMA World Championships, Semi Final	Minsk, Belarus	Decision (30:27)	3	3:00
2017-05-07	Win	(Morocco) Anass Hibaoui	2017 IFMA World Championships, Quarter Final	Minsk, Belarus	Decision (29:28)	3	3:00
2017-05-05	Win	(Sweden) Tolga Atanasov	2017 IFMA World Championships, First Round	Minsk, Belarus	Decision (30:27)	3	3:00
2016-09-26	Win	(China) Wang Wenfeng	2016 Asian Beach Games, Final	Da Nang, Vietnam	Decision (30:27)	3	3:00
Wins 2016 Asian Beach Games -60kg Gold Medal
2016-09-25	Win	(Iraq) Ahmed Abbood	2016 Asian Beach Games, Semi Final	Da Nang, Vietnam	Decision (30:27)	3	3:00
2016-09-22	Win	(Jordan) Saif Zakzook	2016 Asian Beach Games, Quarter Final	Da Nang, Vietnam	Decision (29:28)	3	3:00
2014-11-22	Win	(Kazakhstan) Nurym Kemal	2014 Asian Beach Games, Final	Phuket, Thailand	Decision (5-0)	3	3:00
Wins 2014 Asian Beach Games -57kg Gold Medal
2014-11-21	Win	(Iran) Yasin Ahmadi	2014 Asian Beach Games, Semi Final	Phuket, Thailand	Decision (5-0)	3	3:00
2014-11-19	Win	(Mongolia) Baatarchuluuny Gantogtokh	2014 Asian Beach Games, Quarter Final	Phuket, Thailand	Decision (5-0)	3	3:00
2014-05-	Loss	(Thailand) Thoetkiat Suwat	2014 IFMA World Championships, First Round	Langkawi, Malaysia			
2013-07-02	Win	(Kyrgyzstan) Daniiar Kashkaraev	2013 Asian Indoor and Martial Arts Games, Final	Incheon, South Korea	Decision (5-0)	3	3:00
Wins 2013 Asian Indoor and Martial Arts Games -57kg Gold Medal
2013-07-01	Win	(Malaysia) Mohd Ali Yaakub	2013 Asian Indoor and Martial Arts Games, Semi Final	Incheon, South Korea	Decision (5-0)	3	3:00
2013-06-30	Win	(Turkmenistan) Faruh Haitow	2013 Asian Indoor and Martial Arts Games, Quarter Final	Incheon, South Korea	RSCB		
Legend: Win Loss Draw/No contest Notes

== Television ==
- Anh trai vượt ngàn chông gai season 1 (contestant) (2024)
