= Oleksandr Moisa =

Ukrainian Muay Thai and Lethwei fighter

- Born: September 10, 1994 (age 32); Odesa, Ukraine
- Native name: Олександр Мойса
- Other names: Moisa Muaythai Academy
- Height: 1.82 m (5 ft 11 1/2 in)
- Weight: 70 kg (154 lb; 11 st)
- Division: Lightweight (MMA); Light middleweight Middleweight
- Style: Muay Thai, Lethwei
- Fighting out of: Warsaw, Poland; Bangkok, Thailand (former)
- Team: Nemesis Pro Team/Skra Fight Club; Behzad Warrior Academy (former)
- Trainer: Behzad Rafigh Doust (former)

Kickboxing record
- Total: 48
- Wins: 40
- Losses: 8

Mixed martial arts record
- Total: 8
- Wins: 6
- By knockout: 5
- By decision: 1
- Losses: 2
- By decision: 2

Oleksandr Moisa (Ukrainian: Олександр Мойса; born September 10, 1994) is a Ukrainian mixed martial artist currently competing in the Lightweight division of Konfrontacja Sztuk Walki (KSW).

He is also a former Muay Thai and Lethwei fighter who has competed in ONE Championship and World Lethwei Championship. He is the former WMC Super welterweight World Champion in Muay Thai and the final WLC Light Middleweight World Champion in Lethwei.

== Early life ==
Sasha Moisa was born in Odesa, Ukraine. He trained in judo at the age of 13 but turned to Muay Thai at 18.

== Muay Thai and kickboxing career ==
In 2016, he moved to Bangkok to focus on training full-time in Muay Thai.

=== THAI FIGHT and WMC Champion ===
Sasha Moisa first appeared on Thai Fight at THAI FIGHT Khmer 2017, facing the veteran Sudsakorn Sor Klinmee on November 25, 2017. He lost by decision.

On July 7, 2018, Moisa faced Satanfah Rachanon at THAI FIGHT Hat Yai, where he lost a questionable extra-round decision.

On October 19, 2018, Sasha Moisa captured his first major Muay Thai world title when he defeated Bangpleenoi Petchyindee Academy by second-round knockout to claim the World Muaythai Council Super Welterweight Championship.

On November 24, 2018, Moisa defeated Cambodia's Keo Rumchong at THAI FIGHT Saraburi by second-round TKO in the 2018 THAI FIGHT Kard Chuek 70 kg Semi-Finals. He was originally scheduled to face Saensatharn P.K. Saenchai Muaythaigym for the 2018 THAI FIGHT Kard Chuek 70 kg Championship and ultimately won the title by forfeit when Saensatharn was forced to withdraw due to injury. He finally faced Saensatharn at THAI FIGHT Mueang Khon 2019 on March 30, 2019. Moisa won in upset fashion when he stopped Saensatharn with a one-punch knockout.

=== ONE Championship ===
Sasha Moisa made his debut for ONE Championship when he entered the ONE Featherweight Kickboxing World Grand Prix, facing Jo Nattawut at ONE Championship: Enter the Dragon on May 17, 2019. Moisa went on to lose via third-round TKO.

Moisa was originally scheduled to face Yodsanklai Fairtex at ONE Championship: Age Of Dragons but was forced to withdraw from the bout. He ultimately returned at ONE Warrior Series 10 on February 19, 2020, where he knocked out Shahzaib Rindh in the third round.

== Lethwei career ==
Sasha Moisa made his Lethwei debut on February 22, 2019, at WLC 7: Mighty Warriors, where he knocked out Myanmar fighter Shwe Yar Man in the third round. Moisa became the rightful challenger to the title after the strong statement against the Myanmar rising star.

In 2019, he challenged Artur Saladiak for the WLC Light Middleweight World Championship. On August 2, 2019, at WLC 9: King of Nine Limbs, Moisa emerged victorious by unanimous decision and was crowned WLC Light Middleweight World Champion.

== Mixed martial arts career ==
=== Fight Exclusive Night ===
On April 19, 2023, it was announced that Moisa had signed with Polish promotion Fight Exclusive Night (FEN) to compete in mixed martial arts. He is scheduled to make his debut against Adam Brysz at FEN 50 on September 2, 2023.

== Championships and accomplishments ==
=== Muay Thai ===
- THAI FIGHT
  - 2018 Thai Fight 70kg Kard Chuek Champion
- World Muaythai Council
  - 2018 WMC World Super Welterweight 154 lbs Champion
- Real Hero Muay Thai
  - 2018 Real Hero Muay Thai 70 kg 8-Man Tournament Champion
- Elite Fight Night by Elite Boxing
  - 2016 EFN King's Cup Middleweight 4-Man Tournament Champion

=== Lethwei ===
- World Lethwei Championship
  - WLC Light Middleweight World Champion

== Mixed martial arts record ==
Professional record breakdown
8 matches	6 wins	2 losses
By knockout	5	0
By decision	1	2

Res.	Record	Opponent	Method	Event	Date	Round	Time	Location	Notes
Win	6–2	Wojciech Kawa	TKO (punches)	KSW 123	November 21, 2026	2	2:55	Szczecin, Poland	
Win	5–2	Wojciech Kawa	TKO (arm injury)	KSW 116	March 14, 2026	1	2:44	Gorzów Wielkopolski, Poland	
Loss	4–2	Iras Khizriev	Decision (unanimous)	KSW 114	January 17, 2026	3	5:00	Radom, Poland	
Win	4–1	Krystian Blezień	TKO (punches)	KSW 110	September 20, 2025	2	1:47	Rzeszów, Poland	
Win	3–1	Sebastian Rajewski	TKO (retirement)	Babilon MMA 51	March 14, 2025	2	5:00	Ciechanów, Poland	
Win	2–1	Michał Romaneczko	Decision (unanimous)	Fight Exclusive Night 54	May 17, 2024	3	5:00	Piła, Poland	
Win	1–1	Mateusz Bialas	TKO (punches)	The Warriors MMA 2	December 9, 2023	1	0:58	Ruda Śląska, Poland	
Loss	0–1	Adam Brysz	Decision (unanimous)	Fight Exclusive Night 50	September 2, 2023	3	5:00	Gliwice, Poland	Lightweight debut.

== Muay Thai & kickboxing record ==
Muay Thai & kickboxing record
40 wins, 8 Losses
Date	Result	Opponent	Event	Location	Method	Round	Time
2020-02-19	Win	(Pakistan) Shazaib Rindh	ONE Warrior Series 10	Kallang, Singapore	KO (Punches)	3	2:11
2019-05-17	Loss	(Thailand) Jo Nattawut	ONE Championship: Enter the Dragon	Kallang, Singapore	TKO (3 Knockdown Rule)	3	1:24
ONE Kickboxing Featherweight Grand Prix Quarter-Finals
2019-03-30	Win	(Thailand) Saensatharn P.K. Saenchai Muaythaigym	THAI FIGHT Mueang Khon 2019	Nakhon Si Thammarat, Thailand	KO (Punch)	1	
2018-11-24	Win	(Cambodia) Keo Rumchong	THAI FIGHT Saraburi	Saraburi, Thailand	TKO (3 Knockdown Rule)	2	
2018-10-19	Win	(Thailand) Bangpleenoi Petchyindee Academy	True4U Toyota Marathon	Bangkok, Thailand	KO (Elbow & Punches)	2	
Wins the WMC World Super Welterweight 154lbs title
2018-07-07	Loss	(Thailand) Satanfah Rachanon	THAI FIGHT Hat Yai	Hat Yai, Thailand	Ext R. Decision	4	3:00
2018-03-11	Win	(Norway) Muhammad Khalil	Real Hero Muay Thai	Bangkok, Thailand	KO (Punches)	1	1:31
Wins the Real Hero Muay Thai 70kg 8-Man Tournament.
2018-03-11	Win	(Thailand) Chanasuek Lookchaomaesaitong	Real Hero Muay Thai	Bangkok, Thailand	KO (Punches)	1	2:36
2018-03-11	Win	(Switzerland) Boyka Bronson	Real Hero Muay Thai	Bangkok, Thailand	KO (Punch)	1	0:20
2017-11-25	Loss	(Thailand) Sudsakorn Sor Klinmee	THAI FIGHT Khmer 2017	Phnom Penh, Cambodia	Decision	3	3:00
2017-09-30	Loss	(Thailand) Buakiew Por.Pongsawang	All Star Fight 2	Bangkok, Thailand	Decision	3	3:00
2017-07-29	Win	(England) Kurtis Allen	Elite Fight Night 10	Kuala Lumpur, Malaysia	TKO (Referee stoppage)	3	2:14
Wins the EFN King's Cup Middleweight 4-Man Tournament.
2017-07-29	Win	(Thailand) Thirapong Kiatkorwit	Elite Fight Night 10	Kuala Lumpur, Malaysia	KO (Punches)	2	1:47
2017-05-31	Win	(Thailand) Singsarawat Sitpinyo	E-1 World Championship	Hong Kong	KO	2	
2017-03-11	Win	(Japan) T-98	REBELS.49	Tokyo, Japan	TKO	3	2:15
2016-12-24	Win	(Thailand) Changpuek Muaythai Academy	Workpoint Super Muaythai	Bangkok, Thailand	Decision	3	3:00
2016-11-26	Win	(Thailand) Singyai Sitchansingh	Workpoint Super Muaythai	Bangkok, Thailand	KO (Elbow)	1	2:09
2016-09-25	Win	(France) Cédric Desruisseaux	Workpoint Super Muaythai	Bangkok, Thailand	Decision	3	3:00
2016-08-12	Win	(Thailand) Petchmankong Nondaeng Gym	Elite Fight Night 6	Bangkok, Thailand	Decision	3	3:00
2016-08-12	Win	(Uzbekistan) Mansurbek Tolipov	Elite Fight Night 6	Bangkok, Thailand	Decision	3	3:00
2015-12-05	Loss	(Thailand) Armin Pumpanmuang	Workpoint Super Muaythai	Bangkok, Thailand	Decision	3	3:00
2014-12-07	Loss	(Thailand) Nontachai Sititsukato	Max Muay Thai	Pattaya, Thailand	Decision	3	3:00
Legend: Win Loss Draw/No contest Notes

== Lethwei record ==
Lethwei record
2 Wins, 0 Losses, 0 Draws
Date	Result	Opponent	Event	Location	Method	Round	Time
2019-08-02	Win	(Poland) Artur Saladiak	WLC 9: King of Nine Limbs	Mandalay, Myanmar	Decision (Unanimous)	5	3:00
Wins WLC Light Middleweight World Championship
2019-02-19	Win	(Myanmar) Shwe Yar Man	WLC 7: Mighty Warriors	Mandalay, Myanmar	KO	3	1:40
Legend: Win Loss Draw/No contest Notes

== See also ==
- List of male kickboxers

Awards and achievements
Preceded by Artur Saladiak	WLC Light Middleweight World Champion; August 2, 2019 – February 1, 2021; WLC defunct due to 2021 Myanmar coup d'état
