= 2017 in World Lethwei Championship =

2017 in WLC

Information
- First date: March 3, 2017
- Last date: November 4, 2017

Events
- Total events: 3

Fights
- Total fights: 26

The year 2017 is the 1st year in the history of the World Lethwei Championship, a Lethwei promotion based in Myanmar.

== List of events ==
#	Event	Date	Venue	Location	Attendance
1	WLC 1: The Great Beginning	March 3, 2017	Mingalardon Event Zone	Yangon, Myanmar	
2	WLC 2: Ancient Warriors	June 10, 2017	Thuwunna Stadium	Yangon, Myanmar	
3	WLC 3: Legendary Champions	November 4, 2017	Thuwunna Stadium	Yangon, Myanmar	

== WLC 1: The Great Beginning ==
WLC 1: The Great Beginning
- Promotion: World Lethwei Championship
- Date: March 3, 2017
- Venue: Mingalardon Event Zone
- City: Yangon, Myanmar

Event chronology
WLC 1: The Great Beginning	WLC 2: Ancient Warriors

WLC 1: The Great Beginning was the inaugural Lethwei event organized by World Lethwei Championship and took place on March 3, 2017, at the Mingalardon Event Zone in Yangon, Myanmar.

=== Background ===
The first WLC event was highly anticipated by the Lethwei fans around the world and took place on re-purposed driving range of the Mingalardon Country Club which was specially built for the event. The weigh-ins for the event were held in Kandawgyi Park in Yangon.

After losing his title to Dave Leduc in December 2016, Lethwei superstar Tun Tun Min returned to face British kickboxer Nicholas Carter in the main event. Tun Tun Min won the fight via brutal knockout in the first round. The co-main event featured Lethwei champion Too Too against Australian Muaythai fighter Eddie Farrell. Too Too won his fight by unanimous decision after he lacerated Farrel's face with punches and opened up a huge gash on his orbital bone.

=== Results ===
WLC 1: The Great Beginning
Weight Class				Method	Round	Time	Notes
Middleweight 75 kg	(Myanmar) Tun Tun Min	def.	(England) Nicholas Carter	Knockout	1	2:59	
Middleweight 75 kg	(Myanmar) Too Too	def.	(Australia) Eddie Farrell	Decision (unanimous)	5	3:00	
Light Middleweight 71 kg	(Myanmar) Thway Thit Win Hlaing	def.	(Myanmar) Saw Ba Oo	Decision (unanimous)	5	3:00	
Light Middleweight 71 kg	(Myanmar) Phoe Thaw	def.	(Malaysia) Jian Kai Chee	Knockout	1	0:47	
Welterweight 67 kg	(Myanmar) Sein Myo Aung	def.	(Myanmar) Ye Man Hein	Decision (unanimous)	5	3:00	
Welterweight 67 kg	(Myanmar) Kyar Pouk	def.	(Cambodia) Prak Chansin	Knockout	1	1:34	
Light Welterweight 63.5 kg	(Myanmar) Yan Naing Tun	def.	(Myanmar) Zwe Shwe Ko	Knockout	3	0:22	
Featherweight 57 kg	(Myanmar) Thet Paing Oo	def.	(Myanmar) Shwe Phar Se	Decision (Split)	3	3:00	
Light Middleweight 71 kg	(Myanmar) Pite Htwe	def.	(Myanmar) Tun Tun Naing	Knockout	2	1:00	
Lightweight 60 kg	(Myanmar) Ye Tway	def.	(Myanmar) Saw Min Naing	Decision (unanimous)	3	3:00	

== WLC 2: Ancient Warriors ==
WLC 2: Ancient Warriors
- Promotion: World Lethwei Championship
- Date: June 10, 2017
- Venue: Thuwunna Stadium
- City: Yangon, Myanmar

Event chronology
WLC 1: The Great Beginning	WLC 2: Ancient Warriors	WLC 3: Legendary Champions

WLC 2: Ancient Warriors was a Lethwei event held on June 10, 2017, in Thuwunna Stadium in Yangon, Myanmar.

=== Background ===
The main event featured a bout between top lethwei fighter Soe Lin Oo and Polish kickboxing champion Artur Saladiak. The co-main event featured Lethwei star Too Too against French Muaythai champion James Benal, France's top welterweight. Brent Bolsta was originally scheduled to compete at the event, but was involved in a motorcycle accident five days before the event. After 5 rounds, Too Too defeated Benal by decision and it was announced that he will be facing multiple-times Australian Muay Thai champion Michael Badato for the Middleweight World Lethwei Championship. Artur Saladiak outpointed Soe Lin Oo in the main event to earn a decision win, becoming the first foreign fighter to defeat Soe Lin Oo.

=== Results ===
WLC 2: Ancient Warriors
Weight Class				Method	Round	Time	Notes
Light Middleweight 71 kg	(Poland) Artur Saladiak	def.	(Myanmar) Soe Lin Oo	Decision (Unanimous)	5	3:00	
Middleweight 75 kg	(Myanmar) Too Too	def.	(France) James Benal	Decision (Unanimous)	5	3:00	
Light Middleweight 71 kg	(Myanmar) Thway Thit Win Hlaing	def.	(Myanmar) Shwe Yar Mann	Decision (Unanimous)	5	3:00	
Light Middleweight 71 kg	(Myanmar) Phoe Thaw	def.	(Australia) Josh Fitzroy	Knockout	4	2:35	
Welterweight 67 kg	(Myanmar) Kyar Pouk	def.	(Myanmar) Htet Aung Oo	Knockout (Medical Stoppage)	2	1:12	
Welterweight 67 kg	(Myanmar) Phoe La Pyae	def.	(Myanmar) Sein Myo Aung	Knockout	2	1:48	
Middleweight 75 kg	(Myanmar) Pite Htwe	def.	(Myanmar) Ye Yint Aung	Decision (Unanimous)	4	3:00	
Welterweight 67 kg	(Myanmar) Sithu	def.	(Myanmar) Shan Lay	Decision (Split)	4	3:00	

== WLC 3: Legendary Champions ==
WLC 3: Legendary Champions
- Promotion: World Lethwei Championship
- Date: November 4, 2017
- Venue: Thuwunna Stadium
- City: Yangon, Myanmar

Event chronology
WLC 2: Ancient Warriors	WLC 3: Legendary Champions	WLC 4: Barekunckle-King

WLC 3: Legendary Champions was Lethwei event held on November 4, 2017, in Thuwunna Stadium in Yangon, Myanmar.

=== Background ===
The main event featured Lethwei champion Too Too against Australian kickboxing champion Michael Badato. In the co-main event, Saw Nga Man defeated Eddie Farrell by unanimous decision. After a hard-fought five round battle, Too Too emerged victorious to claim the Middleweight World Lethwei Championship title. Umar Semata made his debut against veteran Soe Lin Oo and lost by knockout in the second round. ONE Championship Middleweight World Champion Aung La Nsang also made a special appearance at the event.

=== Results ===
WLC 3: Legendary Champions
Weight Class				Method	Round	Time	Notes
Middleweight 75 kg	(Myanmar) Too Too	def.	(Australia) Michael Badato	Decision (Unanimous)	5	3:00	For the Middleweight World Lethwei Championship
Super Middleweight 79 kg	(Myanmar) Saw Nga Man	def.	(Australia) Eddie Farrell	Decision (Unanimous)	5	3:00	
Light Middleweight 71 kg	(Myanmar) Soe Lin Oo	def.	(Uganda) Umar Semata	Knockout	2	1:14	
Light Middleweight 71 kg	(Poland) Artur Saladiak	def.	(Romania) Alex Bublea	Decision (Unanimous)	5	3:00	
Light Middleweight 71 kg	(Myanmar) Thway Thit Win Hlaing	def.	(Myanmar) Shan Ko	Knockout	1	1:55	
Light Middleweight 71 kg	(Myanmar) Phoe La Pyae	def.	(Cambodia) Rin Saroth	Knockout	3	1:10	
Featherweight 57 kg	(Myanmar) Mite Yine	def.	(Myanmar) Pha Kyaw Hae	Decision (Unanimous)	2	2:50	
Lightweight 60 kg	(Myanmar) Chit Maung Maung	def.	(Myanmar) Doe Lay	Decision (Unanimous)	4	3:00	

== See also ==
- 2017 in ILFJ
