= Mudon Township =

Coordinates: 16.2500°N 97.7167°E

Mudon Township ပွိုင်ဍုင်မုဟ်ဍုင် မုဒုံမြို့နယ်
- Township
- Location in Mawlamyine district
- Country: Myanmar
- State: Mon State
- District: Mawlamyine District
- Time zone: UTC+6:30 (MMT)

Mudon Township (Burmese: မုဒုံမြို့နယ်) is a township of Mawlamyine District in the Mon State of Myanmar.

It is the birthplace of student activist Min Ko Naing. Activist, Pe Thein Zar, was born in Kamawet Village, about 15 km south of Mudon. Ketumala, a Buddhist nun, was also born in Mudon Township.
