= Myaing Gyi Ngu =

Myaing Gyi Ngu မြိုင်ကြီးငူ
- Village
- Location in Myanmar (Burma)
- Coordinates: 17°21′32″N 97°40′26″E
- Country: Myanmar
- Division: Kayin State
- District: Hpa-an District
- Township: Hpa-an Township
- Population: over10000 (resident)+ 10000 (IDPs)
- Time zone: UTC+6.30 (MMT)

Myaing Gyi Ngu (Burmese: မြိုင်ကြီးငူ) is a village in the Hpa-an District of Kayin State, Myanmar. It is the location of a camp for internally displaced people where over 5,000 people live.

On 1 May 2018 U Thuzana, a Buddhist monk and spiritual advisor to the armed insurgent group the Democratic Karen Buddhist Army, led 300 followers to illegally build a stupa on the grounds of an Anglican church in Myaing Gyi Ngu (one of several he has built near churches and mosques) causing religious tensions and receiving widespread condemnation.
