= Thuwunna National Indoor Stadium (1) =

Indoor stadium in Burma

National Indoor Stadium (1)
- Burmese: အမျိုးသားအားကစားပြိုင်ပွဲရုံ (၁) သုဝဏ္ဏ
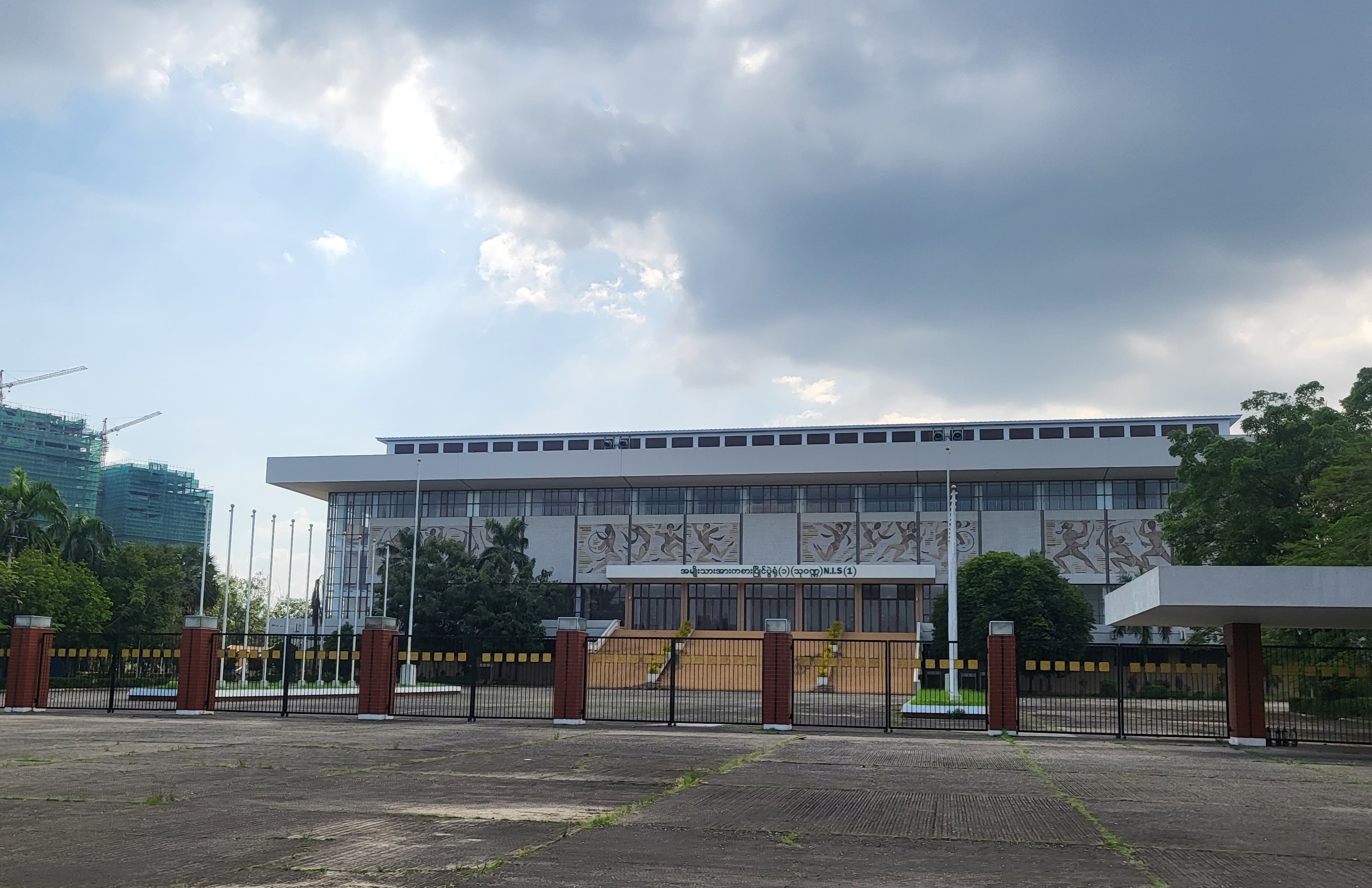
- Interactive map of National Indoor Stadium (1)
- Location: Thingangyun, Yangon, Myanmar
- Coordinates: 16°49′1.5″N 96°11′8.4″E
- Owner: Ministry of Sports and Youth Affairs
- Operator: Department of Sports and Physical Education
- Capacity: 10,825

Construction
- Groundbreaking: 1983
- Opened: 1986
- Renovated: 11 August 2019

National Indoor Stadium (1), Thuwunna is an indoor stadium located in Yangon, Myanmar. It is the largest indoor sports stadium in Myanmar, with a capacity of 10,825 people and located near Thuwunna Stadium.

== History ==
The Thuwanna National Indoor Stadium was built by China in 1983. Completed in 1986, it became the country's first modern indoor stadium. Later, with the support of the United States, No (2) National Indoor Stadium was opened at Yangon University - Hlaing Campus, but not as big as No. (1).

During the 2013 Southeast Asian Games, modern sports facilities such as the Wunna Theikdi Indoor Stadium in Zambu Thiri Sports Complex and Zeyar Thiri Indoor Stadium in the military-owned Zeyar Thiri Sports Complex emerged in Naypyidaw. However, unlike the Thuwanna Indoor Stadium, these stadiums are a combination of the 3,000-seat A and C Stadiums and the 5,000-seat B Stadium.

Since August 2019, China has been repairing and renovating the dilapidated stadium.

The stadium held many Lethwei events and mixed martial arts events by ONE Championship.
