= Cyrus Washington =

American fighter

- Born: October 28, 1983 (age 42); Saginaw, Michigan, U.S.
- Other names: Black Dynamite
- Height: 1.78 m (5 ft 10 in)
- Weight: 84 kg (185 lb; 13 st 3 lb)
- Style: Taekwondo, Muay Thai, Lethwei
- Team: Phuket Top Team; Tiger Muay Thai
- Rank: 3rd Degree Black Belt in Taekwondo

Kickboxing record
- Total: 109
- Wins: 80
- By knockout: 50
- Losses: 25
- Draws: 4

Other information
- Website: Official website

Cyrus Washington (born October 28, 1983) is an American kickboxer, Taekwondo, Muay Thai and Lethwei fighter. He is former WKA, WMF, WKBF and PK-1 Muay Thai World Champion, as well as former WBC Muaythai USA Champion, WMC and Lumpinee Stadium title contender. In 2012, he competed in the Emmy nominated Thailand VS Challenger TV Series. Washington received worldwide attention for being one of the first successful foreigners to compete in Lethwei in Myanmar.

== Early life ==
Washington started training Japanese Kendo at a young age and boxed as an amateur. At 10 years old, he got enrolled in Taekwondo, under WTF Taekwondo, and trained consistently until becoming an elite competitor in the state in Michigan. In 7th grade, when his teacher asked him what he wanted to be when he grew up. Washington replied: “A kickboxer”.

== Career ==
=== Muaythai ===
On February 22, 2010, Washington scored a 1st-round knockout against rising Muaythai star Harlee Por.Pramuk winning the Pk-1 Championship Belt at Patong Boxing Stadium in Phuket, Thailand.

On December 29, 2010, as he was moving up in the ranks, Washington faced 5-times World Muay thai Champion Jomhod Kiatadisak in Phuket, Thailand. Washington went full 5-rounds with the Muay thai legend losing the fight on points to a close decision.

On 6 April 2011, Washington faced Cosmo Alexandre in a Super Fight bout for Battle in the Desert II in Primm, Nevada organized by the Lion Fight Promotions. Alexandre won the fight by decision.

On September 10, 2011, Washington was scheduled to face Dave Zuniga in Winnipeg, Canada for the IKF Intercontinental Middleweight Championship. However, due legal issues and pending charges, Washington was refused entry into Canada the Thursday prior to the event.

On April 28, 2012, Washington faced Ky Hollenbeck at the Legends Muay Thai Championship in San Francisco, California. Hollenbeck won with a vicious spinning elbow knockout in round one to take the WMC Intercontinental Middleweight (-72.58 kg/160 lb) belt.

On 21 December 2019, Washington faced Thai Fight Champion Tengnueng Sitjaesairoong and lost by decision on points.

As of 2013, Washington was ranked #5 Middleweight in the world by Muaythai Authority.

==== Enfusion ====
In 2010, Washington participate in the first Enfusion Reality TV show called Test of the Champions, a professional kickboxing show produced by It's Showtime in the Koh Samui, Thailand.

==== WBC Title ====
On 22 October 2011, Washington faced Stephen Richards at Bangkok Fight Night 11 in Atlanta, Georgia with the WBC Muay Thai National Super Middleweight title on the line. The fight was declared a majority draw and no one walked away with the title.

On 7 September 2013, Washington faced Marcus Fisher the Warriors Cup XVIII event in New Jersey, USA for the WBC Middleweight National Title. Washington was declared the winner by unanimous decision and claimed the WBC Super Middleweight US National Title.

On 14 June 2014, Washington faced Brett Hlavacek and lost the title via unanimous Decision.

==== WKA Championship ====
On 13 December 2013, Washington faced James Martinez, who represented the United States at The Contender Asia. The fight took place on Take-On Productions in New York with the WKA Welterweight World Championship on the line. Washington claimed the title after knocking out Martinez via spinning back kick to the stomach in the second round.

==== The Challenger Muay Thai ====
In 2012, Washington competed in the Thailand based reality television series Thailand VS Challenger broadcast on AXN Network in Asia. The show was nominated for the International Emmy Award for Best Non-Scripted Entertainment. The show was a follow-up to Stephan Fox's The Contender Asia.

==== Freedom Muaythai ====
On July 6, 2022, Washington faced Hungarian Muaythai Champion Joni Mate in the main event at Freedom 6 in Yonkers, New York. Washington won by TKO in the first round to capture the Freedom World Light Heavyweight title.

=== Lethwei ===
==== Lethwei Debut ====
On 26 September 2010, Washington made his Lethwei debut facing Saw Nga Man who was the Openweight champion at the time. During the fight, Washington landed a powerful elbow on Saw Nga Man. The Burmese then avoided engagement trying to protect his swollen eye from more damage. With no stoppage, the fight ended in a draw according to Traditional rules Lethwei.

"Headbutts? Yeah it's dangerous, but I think all ways of fights are dangerous" said Washington.

==== Tun Tun Min trilogy ====
A few months before their first fight where Tun Tun Min had beaten Saw Nga Man for the openweight title. Their first meeting was on December 7, 2014 at the inaugural Air KBZ sponsored Aung Lan Championship. In a stunning upset Washington knocked out Tun Tun Min in round three in spectacular fashion. Even after using his time-out Tun Tun Min could no longer continue. Because the bout was considered an exhibition match, the openweight title was not at stake.

The rematch took place 4 months later on April 11, 2015 at Thuwunna National Indoor Stadium in Yangon. Cyrus was once again able to knock out Tun Tun Min with a spinning technique. Unlike in their first fight Tun Tun Min was able to recover during his timeout and eventually knock Cyrus down in the 5th round prompting the corner to throw in the towel. Cyrus later explained that there was some confusion about the rules. He tried to call for a timeout, but according to the official rules you cannot use one in the last round and resulted in the towel being thrown.

On December 20, 2015, Tun Tun Min faced Cyrus Washington at the second Air KBZ Aung Lan Championship, for their third and final fight. The fight ended quickly and Tun Tun Min struck Cyrus on the eye socket. After taking his timeout Cyrus made clear that he did not want to continue, and the match was stopped declaring Tun Tun Min the victor after just 71 seconds. After the fight many fans were displeased with how the fight concluded and threw bottles and other items into the ring.

==== Facing Too Too ====
After facing going 1-1 versus Tun Tun Min, Washington campaigned to fight more Burmese Lethwei Champions and he was set to face Lethwei Champion Too Too in July 2015.

On 26 July 2015, Washington faced Too Too inside the Thein Pyu Stadium in Yangon under traditional Lethwei rules. Before the fight both men had agreed to a potentiel extension of the fight in case the fight went into a draw. The match went for seven rounds rather than the sport's typical five. The fight ended in a draw, but both fighters said did not want to fight for this long again. Cyrus was set to face Tun Tun Min in December for a third and deciding grudge match.

==== Challenging Leduc ====
Washington and Dave Leduc being the only two fighter to have stopped knockout artist Tun Tun Min, during Leduc's rise in Lethwei, fans often entertained the idea of a match between the two foreigners. In 2017, Washington officially challenged Leduc, who agreed to a challenge under traditional Lethwei rules.

On August 20, 2017, Washington faced Leduc inside the Thuwunna National Indoor Stadium in Yangon, Myanmar, at the occasion of Myanmar Lethwei World Championship. With over 100 fights to his record, Washington was the more experienced fighter of the two with Leduc having only 22 fights. Thought Leduc dominated by applying pressure, drawing blood, and backing his opponent down, the fight was declared a draw under traditional Lethwei rules marking Leduc's fourth title defense in eight months.

On 7 November 2020, Washington challenged Dave Leduc for the second and final time to determine who is the best foreign Lethwei fighter. The fight was held at the Outlaw Saloon in Cheyenne, Wyoming under traditional Lethwei rules inside a cage. The announcer for the event was Robin Black and the presenter was Kody Mommaerts. Leduc won the fight by TKO.

== Personal life ==
On 22 July 2018, Washington was involved in a shooting while working security at a Houston nightclub. He suffered gun shot wounds to his lower abdomen and the bullet exited his leg. Washington now lives in Houston, Texas with his children.

== Championships and accomplishments ==
Championships

- Freedom Fighter Promotions
  - 2022 Freedom Light Heavyweight Champion
- World Boxing Council (WBC)
  - WBC American Middleweight Champion
- World Kickboxing Association (WKA)
  - 2013 WKA Welterweight World Champion
- World Muaythai Federation (WMF)
  - WMF Super Middleweight World Champion
- World Kickboxing Federation (WKBF)
  - WKBF Middleweight World Champion
- United States Muay Thai Association (USMTA)
  - 2015 USMTA US Champion
- PK-1 Muay Thai
  - 2009-2011 Thailand Champion
- Lumpinee Stadium
  - 2017 Lumpinee Stadium Light heavyweight Title Contender (−77 kg)
- Thailand VS Challenger TV Series
  - Competitor on Team Challenger

Awards, records, and honours

- Lethwei
  - Competed in the first Lethwei World Championship title fight in North America vs. Dave Leduc
- Magazines
  - 2010 Featured in Penthouse Magazine
  - 2010 Featured in the Muay Siam Magazine

== Lethwei record ==
Professional Lethwei record
1 wins (1 KOs), 3 losses, 3 draws
Date	Result	Opponent	Event	Location	Method	Round	Time
2020-11-07	Loss	(Canada) Dave Leduc	Sparta Wyoming IV	Outlaw Saloon, Cheyenne, Wyoming	TKO	4	2:40
For the Openweight Lethwei Golden Belt & Sparta Lethwei World Championship
2017-08-20	Draw	(Canada) Dave Leduc	2017 Myanmar Lethwei World Championship	Yangon, Myanmar	Draw	5	3:00
For the Openweight Lethwei Golden Belt & Openweight Myanmar Lethwei World Championship Title
2015-12-20	Loss	(Myanmar) Tun Tun Min	2015 Air KBZ Aung Lan Championship	Yangon, Myanmar	TKO	1	
2015-07-26	Draw	(Myanmar) Too Too	Monsoon Fight	Yangon, Myanmar	Draw	7	3:00
2015-04-11	Loss	(Myanmar) Tun Tun Min	Thingyan Fight 2015	Yangon, Myanmar	TKO	5	
2014-12-07	Win	(Myanmar) Tun Tun Min	2014 Air KBZ Aung Lan Championship	Yangon, Myanmar	KO (spinning heel kick)	3	
2010-09-26	Draw	(Myanmar) Saw Nga Man	International Lethwei Challenge Fights	Yangon, Myanmar	Draw	5	3:00
Legend: Win Loss Draw/No contest Notes

== Muay Thai record ==
Professional Muay Thai record
80 wins (50 (T)KOs, 25 loss, 1 draw
Date	Result	Opponent	Event	Location	Method	Round	Time
2024-02-02	Win	(United States) Jesset Campos	Mitten Muay Thai	Clinton Township, Michigan	TKO	2	
2022-09-17	Loss	(France) Adrien Rubis	Freedomfighter: Freedom 7	New York City, New York	Decision (split)	5	3:00
Lost the Freedom Light Heavyweight World Championship
2022-07-06	Win	(Hungary) Joni Mate	Freedomfighter: Freedom 6	Yonkers, New York	TKO	1	
Wins the Freedom Light Heavyweight World Championship
2019-12-21	Loss	(Thailand) Tengnueng Sitjaesairoong	THAI FIGHT: Thai Fest in Patong	Phuket, Thailand	Decision	3	
For the 2019 THAI FIGHT 81kg Superfight belt
2015-10-11	Win	(United States) Ngoohaopetch Sor.Jor.Surapoj	Max Muay Thai	Bangkok, Thailand	KO	2	
2014-07-19	Win	(United States) JR Hines	Take On Productions	New York, United States	TKO	1	
2014-06-14	Loss	(United States) Brett Hlavacek	Warriors Cup XVII	San Francisco, California	Decision	5	
Lost WBC Muay Thai National Super Middleweight Championship
2013-12-13	Win	(United States) James Martinez	Take-On Productions	New York, United States	KO (spinning back kick)	2	
Wins WKA Welterweight World Championship
2013-11-03	Loss	(China) Yi Long	2013 in Wu Lin Feng	Las Vegas, USA	Decision	3	
2013-09-07	Win	(United States) Marcus Fisher	Warriors Cup XVIII	San Francisco, California, United States	Decision	5	
Wins WBC Muay Thai National Super Middleweight Championship
2013-04-06	Win	(Serbia) Strahinja Ivanovic	Warriors cup XV	San Francisco, California	Decision	5	
2013-07-28	Win	(United States) JR Hines	Take On XXI	New York, United States	KO (spinning back kick)	1	
Wins 2015 USMTA National Champion
2012-04-28	Loss	(United States) Ky Hollenbeck	Legends Muay Thai Championship	San Francisco, California, United States	KO	1	
For the WMC Intercontinental Middleweight Championship
2011-12-23	Loss	(Netherlands) Nieky Holzken	Klaar Om Te Bossen 3	Paramaribo, Suriname	TKO (Cut)	2	
2011-10-22	Draw	(United States) Stephen Richards	Bangkok Fight Night 11	Atlanta, Georgia	Draw	5	
For the WBC US National Championship
2011-07-23	Loss	(Thailand) Kaoklai Kaennorsing	Thailand VS Challenger Series 2011	Bangkok, Thailand	TKO	3	
2011-06-23	Win	(China) Hong Guang	Wu Lin Feng 2011 - USA vs China	Zhengzhou, China	KO (spinning heel kick)	1	
2011-05-14	Loss	(Brazil) Cosmo Alexandre	Lion Fight: Battle in the Desert II	Primm, Nevada	Decision	5	
2011-04-05	Win	(Thailand) Thahan Chai	Patong Boxing Stadium	Phuket, Thailand	TKO	1	
2011-03-28	Win	(Thailand) Densakaw	Patong Boxing Stadium	Phuket, Thailand	KO	1	
2010-12-29	Loss	(Thailand) Jomhod Kiatadisak	Bangla Boxing Stadium	Phuket, Thailand	Decision	5	
2010-09-21	Win	(Thailand) Chalermchai	Patong Boxing Stadium	Phuket, Thailand	KO (spinning back kick)	3	
2010-07-01	Win	(Thailand) Chaiyo Thalangyanyeung	Patong Boxing Stadium	Phuket, Thailand	KO	3	
2010-05-05	Win	(Thailand) Yodtawan	Bangla Boxing Stadium	Phuket, Thailand	KO	1	
2010-02-22	Win	(Thailand) Harlee Por. Pramuk	Patong Boxing Stadium	Phuket, Thailand	KO (spinning back kick)	2	
Wins the PK-1 Championship Belt
2009-07-23	Win	(Thailand) Thaharneak	Patong Boxing Stadium	Phuket, Thailand	KO	1	
2009-06-21	Win	(Thailand) Banyat	Patong Boxing Stadium	Phuket, Thailand	KO	3	
2009-05-04	Win	(Thailand) Komsorn	Patong Boxing Stadium	Phuket, Thailand	KO (spinning back kick)	2	
2008-10-17	Win	(Thailand) Anurak	Patong Boxing Stadium	Phuket, Thailand	KO	1	
2008-02-16	Win	(Thailand) Chung Noi	Suwit Boxing Stadium	Phuket, Thailand	KO (spinning back kick)	1	
2008-01-12	Win	(Thailand) Tonphet	Patong Boxing Stadium	Phuket, Thailand	KO	1	
Legend: Win Loss Draw/No contest Notes
