= La Fosse aux Tigres =

2017 Canadian television documentary

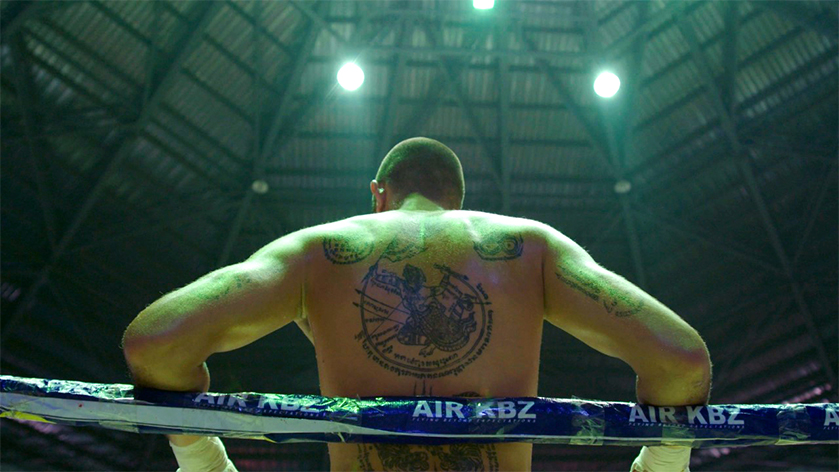
- Genre: Documentary
- Created by: Nish Media
- Directed by: Jason Brennan; J.F. Martel
- Starring: Dave Leduc
- Original language: French

Production
- Production locations: Canada; Thailand; Myanmar
- Running time: 45 minutes

Original release
- Network: Canal D
- Release: November 9, 2017

La Fosse aux Tigres (English: The Tiger's Den) is a 2017 Canadian television documentary about professional fighter Dave Leduc and his journey to Lethwei. The biographical documentary follows Leduc on his way to become world champion and captures his historic fight against Tun Tun Min in 2016 at Thein Pyu Stadium, where Leduc became Openweight Lethwei World Champion and the first non-Burmese to win a Golden Belt. La Fosse aux Tigres was filmed in 3 countries: Canada, Thailand and Myanmar. The documentary was produced by Nish Media and released on November 9, 2017 on Canal D.

== Plot ==
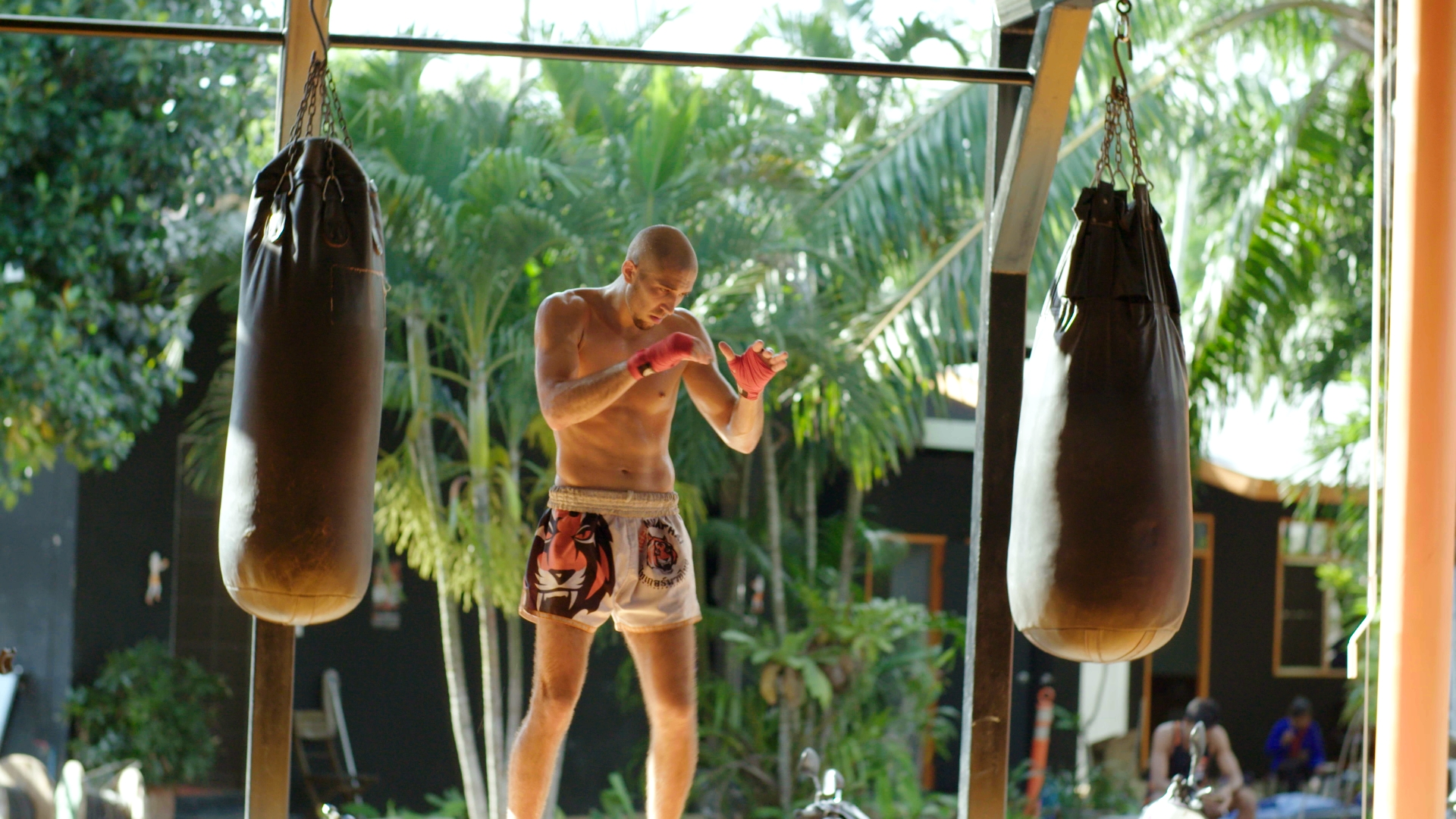
Dave Leduc training before his world title challenge fight, 2016

La Fosse aux Tigres tells the story of Dave Leduc, a Canadian-Burmese martial artist based in Gatineau, Québec, who dreams of competing in the national sport of Myanmar called Lethwei, considered the world's most brutal sport. Having difficulty booking a fight in Myanmar and when a professional fight he's been training for is cancelled, Leduc leaves on his first trip to Myanmar's neighboring country, Thailand. There, he begins his professional career and starts fighting Muaythai to gain ring experience in hopes of one day fighting in Lethwei. While climbing the ranks of the Muaythai circuit, he finds love when he meets Russian model Irina Terehova, which cements his commitment to the fighting life. Leduc attracts attention after winning many key fights, notably inside a maximum security prison in Prison Fight and eventually gets signed to fight Lethwei in Yangon.

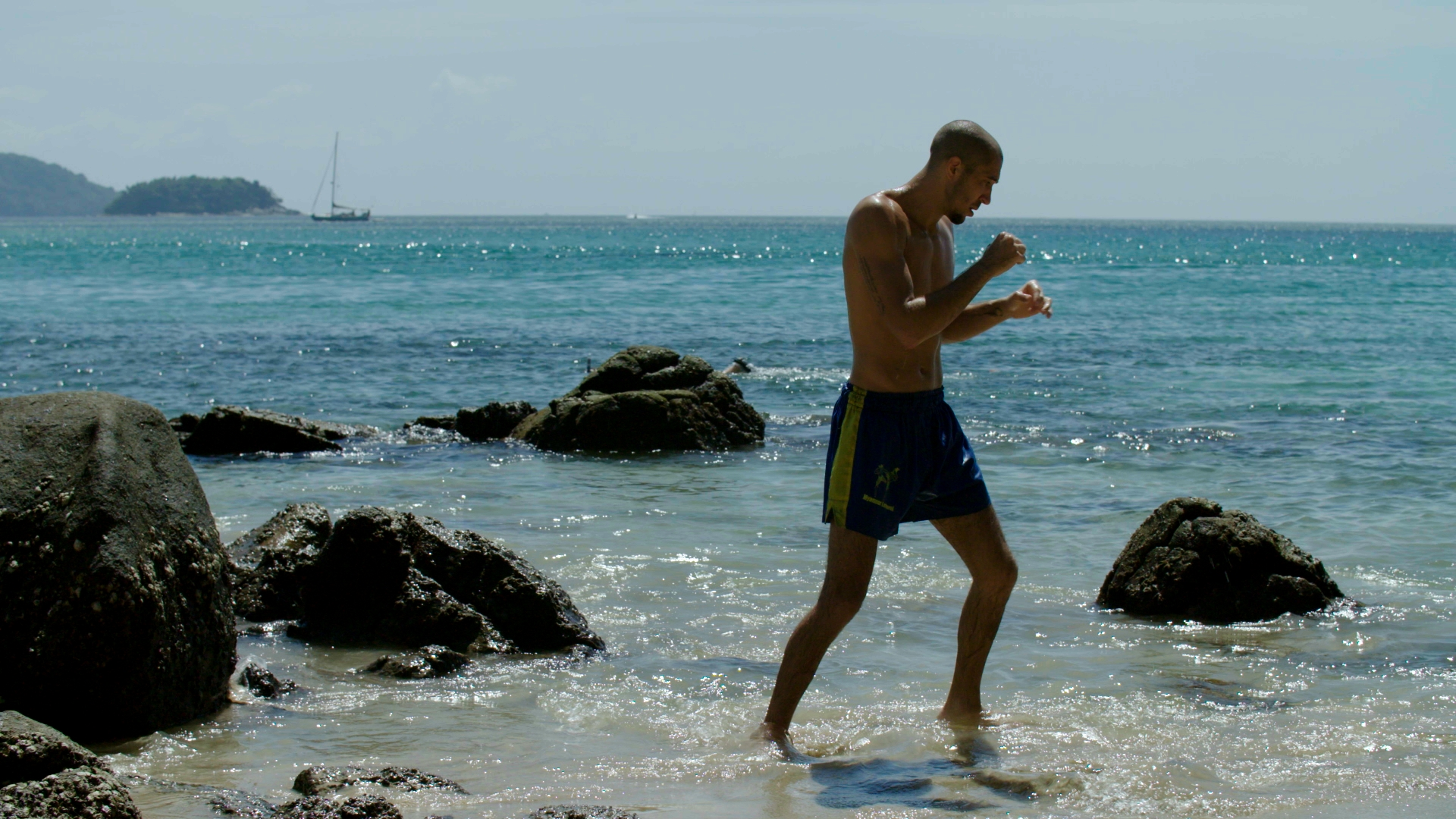
Dave Leduc training on Kata Beach, 2016

In August 2016, Leduc dominated at his first Lethwei fight against Too Too and with the fresh taste of victory, challenged the national hero Tun Tun Min. The two men later fought in October to a draw according to traditional rules and rematched on December 11, 2016, at Thein Pyu Stadium. Confident of beating Leduc, Tun Tun Min sweetened the rematch by putting his prestigious Openweight world title on the line. Leduc ultimately marked history by defeating Tun Tun Min and becoming the first Non-Burmese Lethwei world champion.

== Cast ==
- Dave Leduc: biographic role
- Irina Terehova: Leduc's wife
- Sifu Patrick Marcil: Leduc's coach
- Tun Tun Min: Leduc's opponent
- Umar Semata: Leduc's training partner

== Production and release ==
The documentary was filmed over a 2 years period, from 2015 to 2016, in Gatineau, Ottawa, Montreal, Phuket and Yangon. It was produced by the Gatineau-based agency Nish Media, directed by Jason Brennan and Jean-François Martel. The director of photography was Patrick Kaplin. La Fosse aux Tigres was released exclusively in Canada on Canal D on November 9, 2017. The documentary aired with French subtitles and was well received in Leduc's native province of Québec. The English version, The Tiger's Den, is available on Vimeo on Demand.

== See also ==
- Lethwei in popular culture
- Spirit of Fight
- Born Warriors
- FightWorld
- Stylebender (film)
