= Patrick Marcil =

Canadian mixed martial arts and Lethwei coach

- Born: June 2, 1975 (age 51); Casselman, Ontario, Canada
- Other names: Sifu Patrick Marcil
- Height: 5 ft 8 in (173 cm)
- Style: JKD, Lethwei, MMA
- Rank: Sifu in Fangshendo under Sijo Jacques Patenaude

Other information
- Occupation: Martial artist; trainer
- Spouse: Christine Patenaude
- Children: Kassie Patenaude-Marcil Kira Patenaude-Marcil
- Notable students: Dave Leduc, Marc-André Barriault Julien Leblanc
- Notable clubs: Gatineau, Quebec
- Notable school: Patenaude Martial Arts Gatineau

Patrick Marcil (born June 2, 1975) is a Canadian mixed martial arts and Lethwei coach. He is a sifu (師傅 traditional) in Fangshendo, a modified form of Jeet Kune Do. His students include Lethwei World Champion Dave Leduc and UFC middleweight fighter Marc-André Barriault.

== Career ==
In 1994, Patrick Marcil along with brother-in-law Stephane Patenaude opened their first Kung Fu school in Orléans and shortly after, his second school in Gatineau, Quebec.

In 2003, Marcil fought at World Extreme Battle in Laval, Quebec winning his fight with a TKO at 2:17 in the first round. At 165 pounds, the 26-year-old Marcil was set to fight in the 160lbs category, but instead faced an undefeated 180lb opponent.

In 2009, Patrick Marcil began teaching Sanshou to Dave Leduc at Kung Fu Patenaude in Gatineau. In the Myanmar Times, Leduc explains how Marcil got him ready for Lethwei by teaching him the principles of Jeet Kune Do.

In 2016, for his fights against Too Too and Tun Tun Min, Leduc underwent his training camp in Canada with Marcil.

In 2018, Marcil traveled to Myanmar for the first time to corner Leduc against Diesellek TopkingBoxing and returned in December of the same year for Dave Leduc vs. Tun Tun Min III fight, where Leduc successfully defended his title.

Marcil trains numerous professional MMA fighters in Quebec, Canada. Including, Dave Leduc, Marc-Andre Barriault, and Julien Leblanc. His coaching was featured in Jet Li's defunct website, VICE, Le Droit, Myanmar Times, Asia Times, La Presse, and Ici Radio-Canada.

== Awards and recognitions ==
- Lethwei World
  - Nominated for 2019 Coach of the year

== Filmography ==
| Year | Title | Role | Notes |
|---|---|---|---|
| 2017 | La Fosse aux Tigres | Himself | Fosse Aux Tigres at IMDb |

== Bibliography ==
- Patenaude, Jaques (2011). 10 Secrets To A Rock Solid Martial Arts Foundation. Canada: Trafford Publishing. ISBN 978-1-42695-288-3.
