= Dave Leduc =

Canadian-Burmese Lethwei fighter (born 1991)

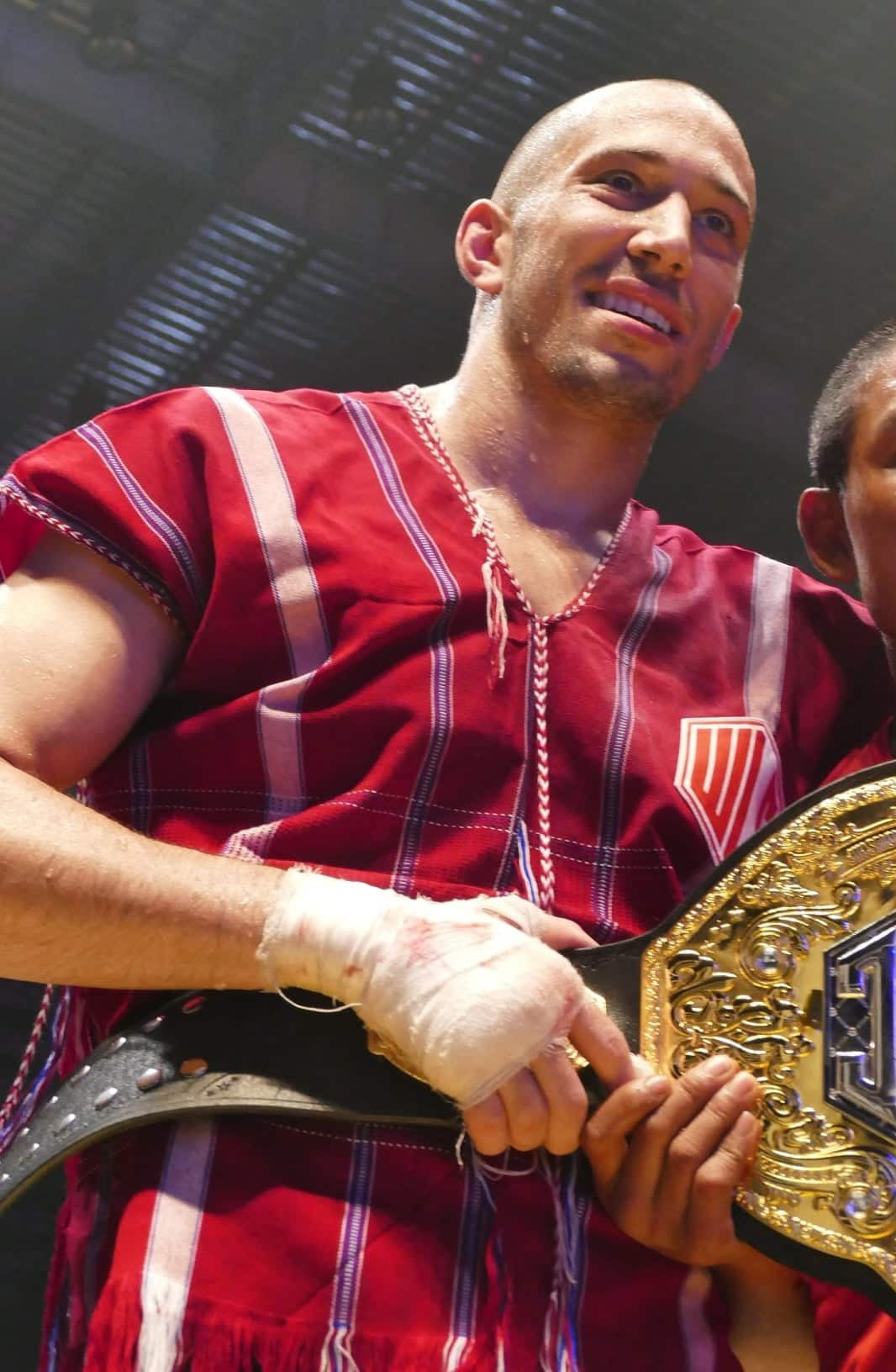
- Leduc in 2019
- Born: December 13, 1991 (age 34); Gatineau, Quebec, Canada
- Nickname: The King of Lethwei; Steel Giraffe ဒေဝ (pronounced 'day-wa')
- Nationality: Canada; Myanmar
- Height: 1.88 m (6 ft 2 in)
- Weight: 165 lb (75 kg; 11 st 11 lb)
- Style: Lethwei, Sanda, Jeet Kune Do
- Stance: Orthodox
- Team: Patenaude Martial Arts (2009–present)
- Trainer: Sifu Patrick Marcil
- Rank: Blue belt in Brazilian Jiu-Jitsu
- Years active: 2013–2023

Other information
- Spouse: Irina Terehova (m. 2016)
- Children: 2
- Website: Official website

Dave Leduc (born 13 December 1991) is a Canadian-Burmese Lethwei fighter. He is a former six-time Lethwei world champion who held the Openweight Lethwei World Championship and was undefeated under traditional rules KO to win. In 2014, Leduc first gained widespread notoriety by winning his fight in the controversial Prison Fight against an inmate inside Klongpai maximum security prison in Thailand. In 2016, he travelled to Myanmar to fight Burmese bareknuckle boxing, considered the world's most brutal sport, and defeated the reigning champion Tun Tun Min to become the first non-Burmese to win the Lethwei Golden Belt title. He married Moldovan model Irina Terehova in a nationally televised traditional Burmese wedding ceremony in Yangon watched by 30 million viewers in Myanmar and became a superstar celebrity in the country.

Leduc is the biggest star in the sport of Lethwei thanks to his exploits in World Lethwei Championship. and has been described as cultural phenomenon in Myanmar. He headlined the two biggest combat events in Myanmar and Cambodia's history, with the Lethwei trilogy fight vs. Tun Tun Min in Myanmar and the Kun Khmer match vs. Prom Samnang in Cambodia, which Prime Minister of Cambodia Hun Manet described as having contributed to strengthening the ties of friendship between Cambodia and Myanmar.

== Early life ==
Born in Gatineau, Leduc starting playing baseball at a young age. In 2005, Leduc represented Outaouais in Baseball at the Summer Quebec Games in Amos and won the bronze medal. He also played in the United States as a pitcher. In 2011, at nineteen years old, Leduc was managing a nightclub in Ottawa and owned a limousine company. He also worked as a mortgage development manager at the Laurentian Bank of Canada.

== Fighting career ==
=== 2009-2015: Martial arts initiation and Prison Fight ===
In 2009, at the age of seventeen, a disagreement with his father forced Leduc to leave his home and live on the streets. Leduc decided to direct his anger into martial arts and joined the martial arts academy of Sifu Patrick Marcil in Gatineau, Quebec. He began learning Sanda, Jeet Kune Do principles, training his headbutts, and hitting the bag bareknuckle while competing in amateur fight nights. Leduc started training and organizing local no-gi grappling tournaments.

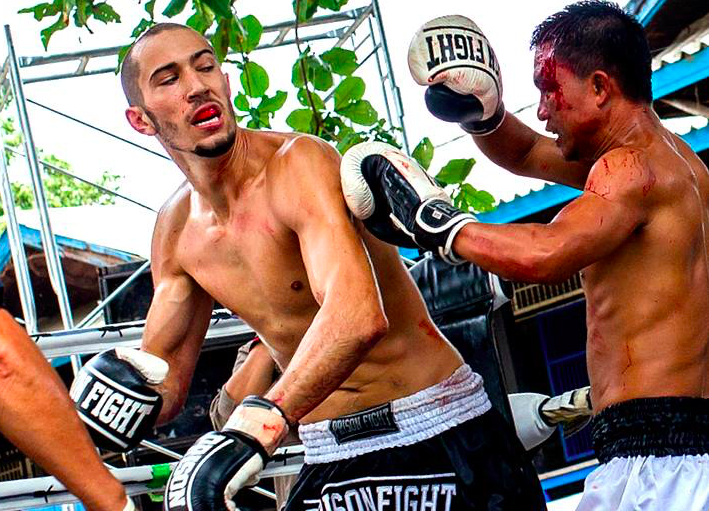
Leduc at Prison Fight inside Klongpai maximum security prison.

Sifu Patrick Marcil showed Leduc an old videotape of a Lethwei event in Myanmar and from this moment Leduc wanted to become a Lethwei fighter. In 2013, Lethwei being illegal in the province of Quebec and having difficulty getting a fight in Myanmar, Leduc went on his first trip to neighboring Thailand to begin his professional career. Myanmar's lack of training facilities led Leduc to move to Phuket in order to train at Tiger Muay Thai. Leduc fought MMA in Canada and went undefeated in his three amateur fights, winning two of them by submission via guillotine choke. His last win was against Tristar Gym fighter and Georges St-Pierre's protege, Yukinori Akazawa, which he won by unanimous decision.

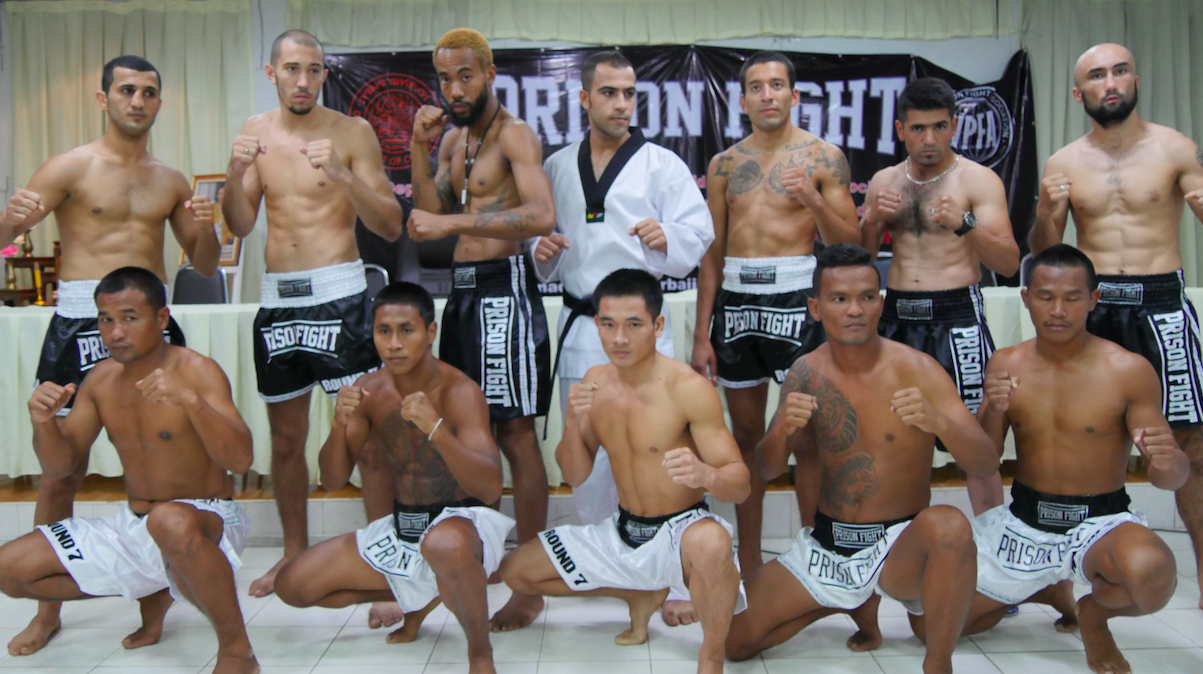
Press conference for Prison Fight: Fight For Freedom held at Klongpai Prison in 2014.

In 2014, Leduc made his pro debut against future UFC welterweight fighter Jonathan Meunier. Having never cut weight as an amateur, Leduc fought at his walking weight 171 lbs. He lost by referee stoppage in the first round and would return to the cage in November 2015 to face future ONE Championship title contender Koyomi Matsushima, this time attempting to drop down to 155 lbs. Matsushima won by referee stoppage in the first round after Leduc was caught by a hammer fist trying to secure a triangle choke.

On July 12, 2014, Leduc took part in the controversial Prison Fight in Thailand, where inmates with serious convictions can reduce their sentences and even earn their freedom by winning a series of fights against foreign fighters. Prison Fight is sanctioned by the Thai Department of Corrections and described as a way for inmates to battle their way to an early release. The event took place in the maximum security Klongpai Central Prison, in Nakhon Ratchasima, two hours north of Bangkok. Leduc faced Thahan Chor.Chatchai, an experienced Muay Thai fighter who competed multiple times at Lumpini Stadium, but was arrested and incarcerated for trafficking methamphetamine. Leduc won by unanimous decision and left the top of his opponent's head lacerated because of repetitive elbow strikes.

When it came to fighting convicts, Leduc said to the Bangkok Post that he wouldn't feel bad if he won and his rival's sentence wasn't reduced. Leduc explained to Argentinian news Infobae the mentality of the inmates at the Prison Fight events, saying:

"They do not fight for money, they fight for their freedom. I only fight for honor and glory." "They deserve to get my 100%, if he wins, then he earns it."

=== 2016-2017: Championship pursuit and Lethwei in Japan ===
In April 2016, Leduc competed in the 2016 Tiger Muay Thai Tryouts in Phuket, and went on to win a place on the professional fight team, along with teammate Dan Hooker.

On August 21, 2016, Leduc was invited to make his Lethwei debut at the 1st Myanmar Lethwei World Championship in Yangon, Myanmar, against Too Too, (34–0) undefeated, 75 kg Lethwei World Champion. Leduc dominated the fight and some furious fans threw projectiles in the ring. The fight ended in a draw according to traditional Lethwei rules.

After his dominant performance over Too Too, Leduc challenged Myanmar star Tun Tun Min, at the time, the Openweight Lethwei World Champion, however the Lethwei Golden Belt was not at stake. The match was held at Thein Pyu Stadium and organized by Great Tiger Group. Tun Tun Min was the heavy favorite heading into the fight and dominated the early rounds. Leduc came back and floored Tun Tun Min a few times. The match was closely contested and ended in a draw according to traditional Lethwei rules. After the match, Tun Tun Min was quoted saying that he had "difficulties with Dave's control of distance, but that he was confident to put on a better performance in their rematch" in December 2016.

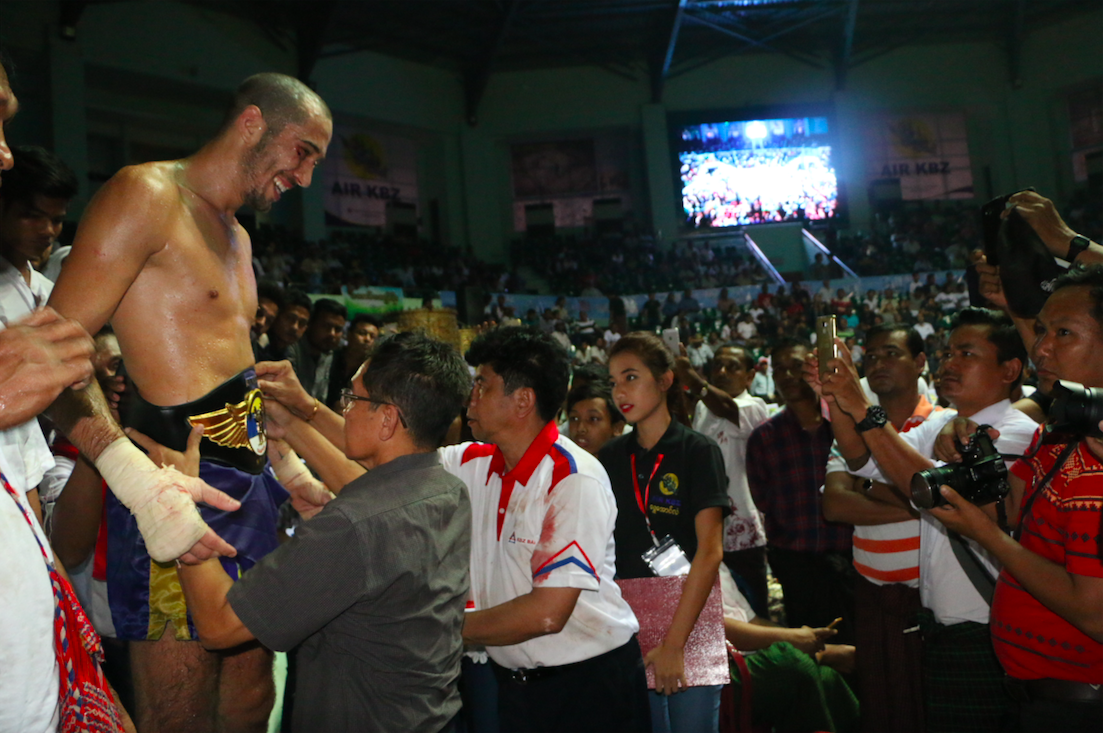
Leduc receiving the Lethwei Golden Belt by U Thein Aung, President of Myanmar Traditional Lethwei Federation

On December 11, 2016, the very anticipated rematch took place at the Air KBZ Aung Lan Championship in Yangon, Myanmar. After previously fighting in October to a draw, Tun Tun Min put the openweight Lethwei Golden Belt on the line. Leduc opened the fight offensively, landing a fake roundhouse kick to sidekick and a counter elbow on Tun Tun Min's face soon after the opening bell. Following these attacks, Tun Tun Min's usual bull rushing style was replaced by a noticeable slower pace. The round continued with aggressive attacks from both sides. In round three, Leduc caught Tun Tun Min's overextended leg and flipped him to the floor twisting his knee, forcing his team to call his time-out. The third round continued with a visibly shaken Tun Tun Min. After a short exchange in the clinch followed by a final takedown, Tun Tun Min was not able to continue and forfeited. Leduc was awarded the Golden Belt, becoming the first non-Burmese fighter to hold the Lethwei openweight world title.

The journey to the world title was captured by Canal D as part of the Canadian documentary titled La Fosse aux Tigres which aired in November 2017. The documentary follows Leduc training and traveling to Yangon to win the Lethwei world title. The movie was filmed in Canada, Thailand and Myanmar.

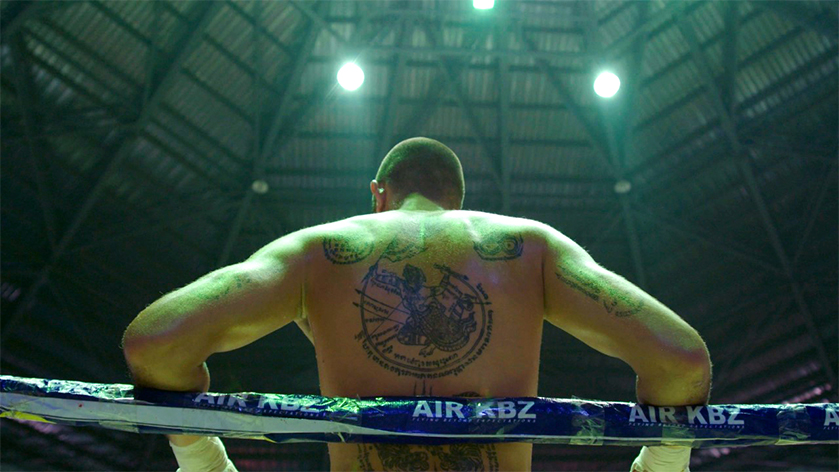
Leduc before his world title challenge at Thein Pyu Stadium, from La Fosse aux Tigres, 2016

On February 16, 2017, for the second event organized by the International Lethwei Federation Japan Leduc headlined Lethwei in Japan 2 at the Korakuen Hall in Tokyo Dome City, Japan. Leduc defended his title for the first time against veteran Lethwei fighter Phoe Kay. In the first round, Leduc performed a vicious spinning elbow knockout, forcing Phoe Kay's corner to call the permitted time-out. They revived him and the fight continued. In the second round, after several knockdowns, Leduc ended the match by KO, winning his first title defense. The Japanese people loved the brutality and aggression of Lethwei, and more events were announced to be held in Tokyo.

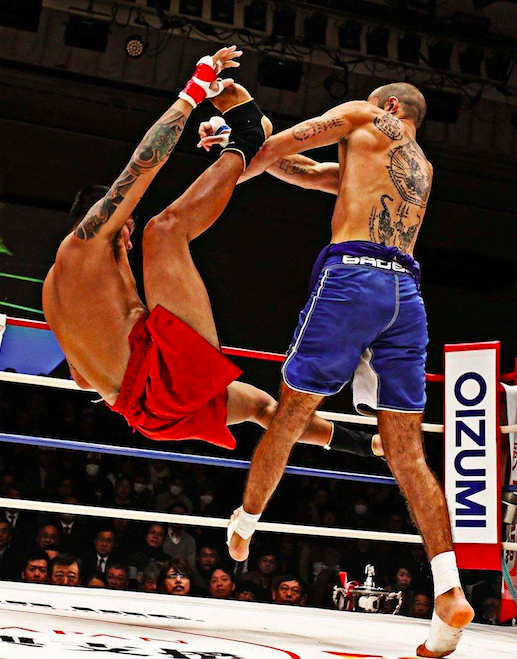
Leduc sweeping Phoe Kay at Lethwei in Japan 2 at Korakuen Hall, Tokyo.

On April 18, 2017, for his second title defense, Leduc faced Turkish Australian fighter Adem Yilmaz at Lethwei in Japan 3 in Tokyo, Japan under traditional Lethwei rules. This match was the first Lethwei world title fight headlining two non-Burmese in the sport's history. For the occasion, the Ambassador of Myanmar to Japan was present at the event held in the Korakuen Hall. In the first round, Leduc scored two knockdowns and landed a powerful headbutt in the clinch. In the second round, Leduc dislocated his right index finger in the clinch and was not able to use his right hand the duration of the fight, but managed to land elbows and headbutts on Yilmaz. After five rounds, the fight was declared a draw according to traditional Lethwei rules with Leduc defending the Lethwei Golden Belt.

For his third title defense, Leduc was set to face American Veteran Cyrus Washington at Lethwei in Japan 4 in Tokyo, Japan. Washington pulled out of the fight citing a hand injury he sustained during training. Leduc's opponent changed to Muaythai Champion Nilmungkorn Sudsakorngym from Thailand. The matchup was billed as Lethwei vs. Muaythai. Leduc made his entrance dressed as the grim reaper at the Tokyo Dome City Hall. In the first round, he landed a headbutt on Nilmungkorn, followed by a right-kick to right-punch move, hitting Nilmungkorn on the jaw forcing him to use his time-out. Leduc ended the match with a knee to the face winning by knockout at 2m:23sec of the second round.

"I respect Cyrus a lot, he is a crafty veteran, he has fought some of the best fighters of the sport, but he has never fought anyone like me. I am not like the others, I'm the King of Lethwei and he wants a taste of the crown", Leduc said in an interview.

On August 20, 2017, Leduc faced Cyrus Washington inside the Thuwunna National Indoor Stadium in Yangon, Myanmar, to defend his openweight Lethwei world title, at the Myanmar Lethwei World Championship. With more than 100 fights on his record, Washington was the more experienced fighter of the two with Leduc having only 22 fights. During Leduc's rise in Lethwei, fans often entertained the idea of a match with Cyrus Washington and pushed for a fight between the two. Having been the only other fighter to score a win over Tun Tun Min, Washington used his time-out and spent remaining of the fight backing up from Leduc and going to the mat upon entering in the clinch trying to protect his lacerated forehead from any further damage. The fight was officially declared a draw under traditional Lethwei rules. and marked Leduc's fourth consecutive title defence in eight months.

On 10 December 2017, Leduc faced former WKN world champion heavyweight kickboxer Corentin Jallon from France. "Fighting him is gonna be like a crocodile bringing a gazelle in the water." Leduc said. Historically, the Air KBZ Aung Lan Golden Belt Championship was a kryptonite event for Lethwei champions, Leduc having won the title by defeating Tun Tun Min, who had won it from Saw Nga Man on the same stage. Inside the Thein Pyu Stadium in Yangon, Leduc executed his ceremonial fight dance Lethwei yay, announcing the start of the match. Just before the first exchange, Leduc challenged Jallon with the Lekkha moun. The Frenchman automatically replied with a flurry of punches, which Leduc countered with an elbow counterattack. In the third round, Leduc executed a diving headbutt which landed on Jallon's right eye, drawing blood. In the fourth round, Leduc had Jallon bent over the ropes from trying to avoid a headbutt. Leduc opened deep cuts and heavily used his headbutts in the clinch. In the fourth round, while he had Jallon's back, Leduc did a provocative humping movement behind him. The fight was declared a draw according to traditional rules and Leduc retained the openweight Lethwei Golden Belt, marking his fifth consecutive title defence.

=== 2018: Myanmar Lethwei World Championship and Tun Tun Min Trilogy ===
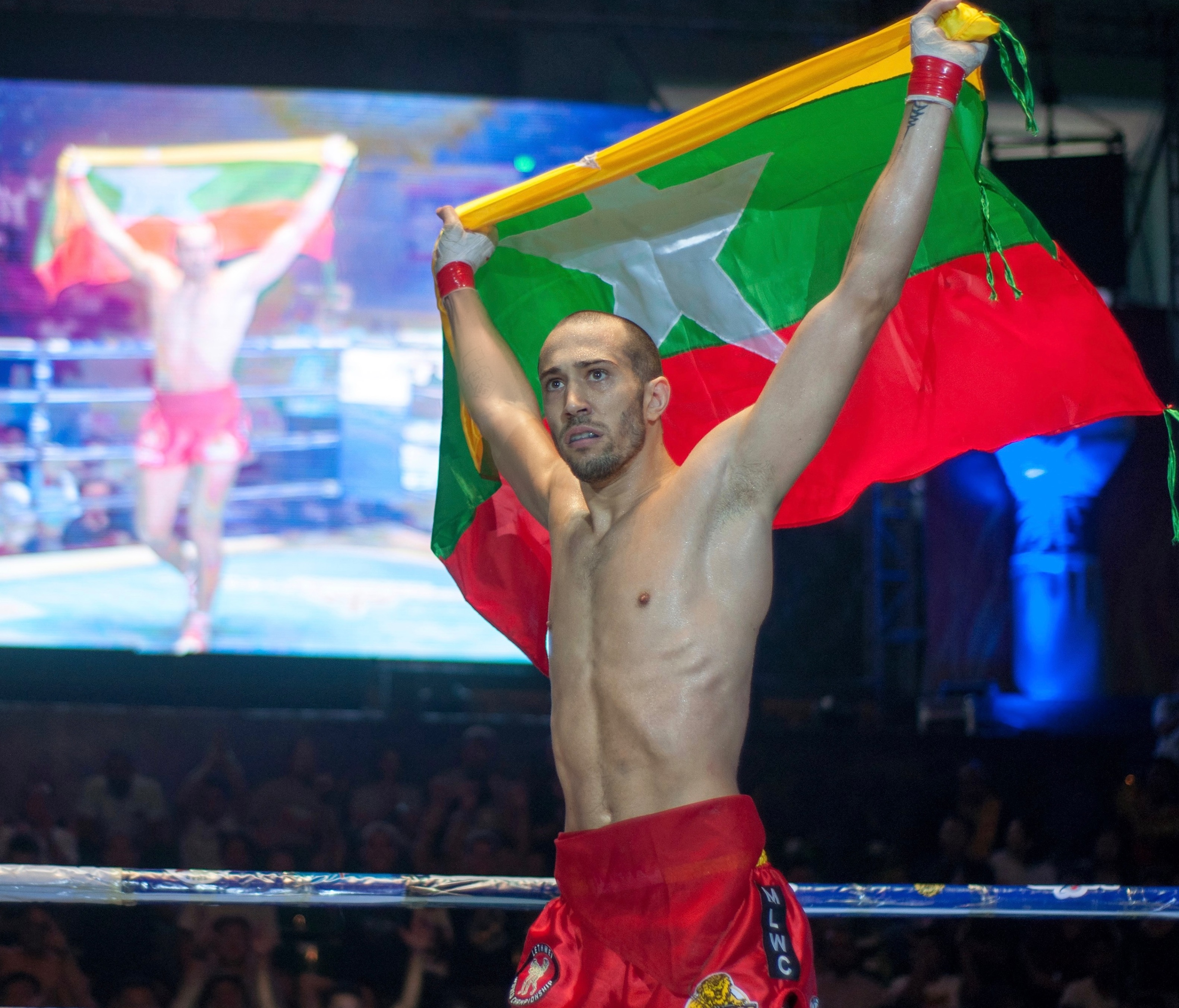
Leduc raising the Myanmar flag at Thein Pyu Stadium, 2018

On 19 August 2018, at the 3rd Myanmar Lethwei World Championship, Leduc returned to face former Rajadamnern Stadium, WPMF and IKF Champion Diesellek TopkingBoxing inside the Thein Pyu Stadium in Yangon, Myanmar.

The matchup was mediatized as Lethwei vs Muaythai. With more than 200 fights to his record, Diesellek was the more experienced fighter of the two, with Leduc having only 24 fights. For this fight and for the first time in his career, Leduc flew his longtime trainer Sifu Patrick Marcil to Myanmar. Prior to the bout, Leduc said in an interview that he respected Diesellek's left kick, having knocked out Lumpini Stadium and Rajadamnern Stadium champion Youssef Boughanem in brutal manner at Lumpini Stadium in 2012.

The fight started with some exchanges in the clinch, with Diesellek trying the first headbutt of the fight which missed and Leduc landing a left uppercut. Leduc continued with a fake right knee, fake left knee, followed by a right elbow, knocking out his opponent. Diesellek's corner called for the allowed injury time-out and woke him up. The fight resumed with Diesellek landing a left kick to Leduc's head. Leduc threw a fake kick to punch, followed by a knee to jaw knocking out Diesellek and breaking his jaw. Leduc won by KO at 2:23 in the first round, marking his sixth title defence. He raised the Myanmar flag and performed the traditional victory dance Lethwei yay.

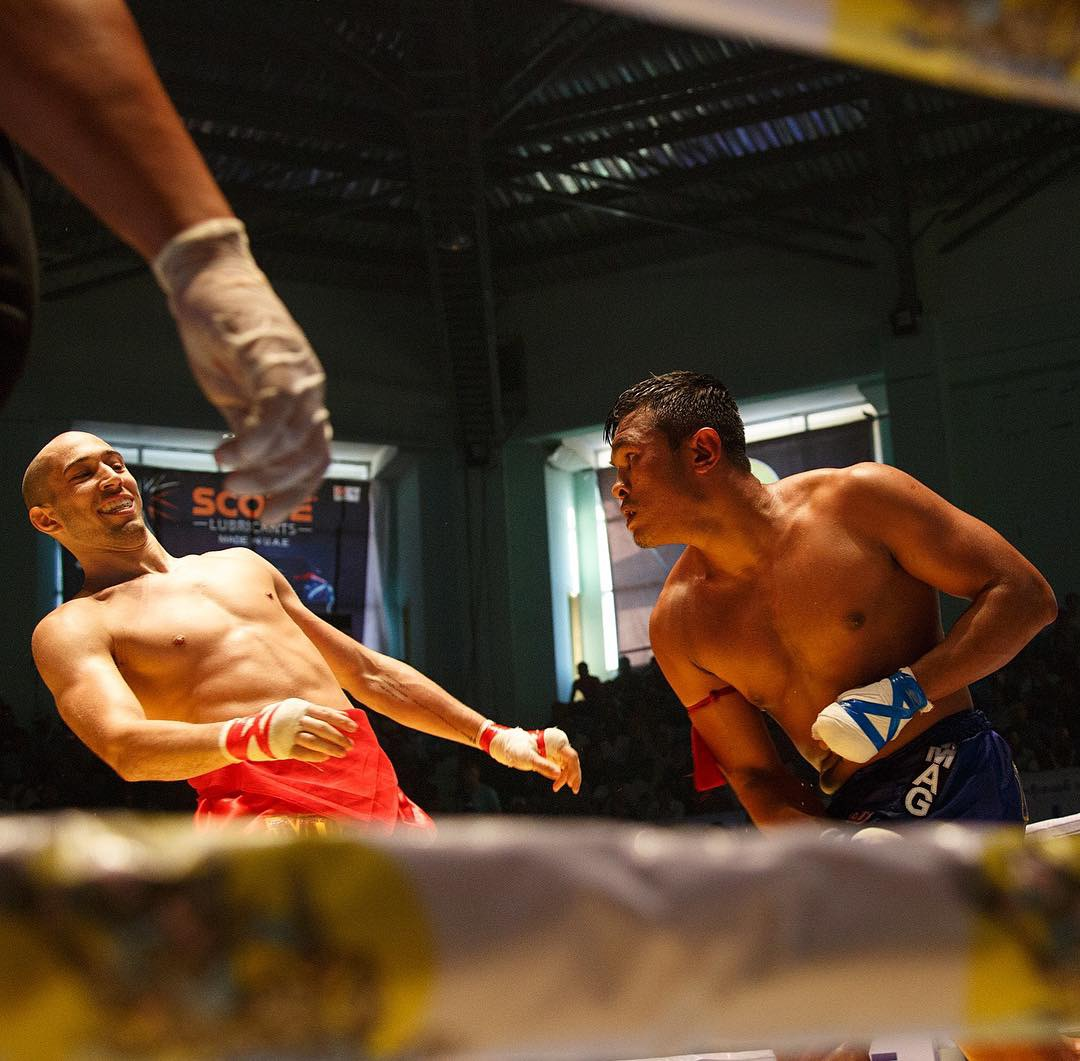
Leduc avoiding a punch from Tun Tun Min during their trilogy fight.

On December 16, 2018, the very anticipated third match between Tun Tun Min took place at the Air KBZ Aung Lan Golden Belt Championship in Yangon. The fight was billed as The Biggest Fight In Lethwei History. The third fight saw Leduc fighting out of the red corner, the first time a foreigner has been able to do so in the history of Lethwei, as it is customary to have non-Burmese fighters come out of the blue corner. Tun Tun Min had tremendous difficulty with the distance control of Leduc. At 1:28 seconds of the first round, Leduc landed a headbutt to the temple in the clinch which floored Tun Tun Min, but managed to get up at the count of eight.

At the 2:35 of the same round, Leduc landed a jumping right elbow that knocked out Tun Tun Min. His team had to call for the 2-minute injury time-out to revive him and attend to a cut above his right eye. The later rounds saw both fighters vying for a finish but ended without another knockout at the final bell and Leduc retained the Lethwei Golden Belt title.

=== 2019–2023: WLC, Lethwei in USA and vacating title ===
In 2017, Leduc had expressed his disagreement with the World Lethwei Championship's usage of the modern Lethwei rules also known as Tournament rules. In 1996, the tournament rules was created by the MTLF and added to some tournaments by removing the controversial injury time-out and adding a decision to determine a winner in the occasion there was no knockout. "It's no secret that I have had real concerns at the beginning about the modern ruleset of WLC. Looking back I think it was more a territorial feud, I was protecting my territory." Leduc told VICE

On March 9, 2019, despite a long-running feud with the promotion, Leduc announced that he had signed an exclusive contract with the World Lethwei Championship which would make it impossible for him to defend his world titles from other Lethwei organizations.

On March 25, 2019, Leduc held a press conference at the Karaweik Palace in Yangon, Myanmar announcing that he was relinquishing three of his four Lethwei world titles. The three titles included the MLWC Title, Air KBZ Aung Lan Championship title and the ILFJ Openweight Lethwei World title, but keeping the Lethwei Golden Belt, therefore remaining the openweight Lethwei World Champion under traditional rules. Leduc became the sports channel ambassador for Canal+ Myanmar.

In 2019, for his promotional debut at World Lethwei Championship, Leduc was set to face TUF 11 & TUF 25 competitor and UFC veteran Seth Baczynski. The bout was scheduled as the main event of WLC 9: King of Nine Limbs inside Mandalar Thiri Indoor Stadium in Mandalay, Myanmar for the inaugural Cruiserweight World Lethwei Championship. Baczynski felt confident leading up to the fight because he had significantly more fighting experience than Leduc. The weigh ins and face-off was officiated by Full Metal Dojo founder Jon Nutt presenting the WLC belt. On August 2, 2019, Leduc landed an elbow strike which exploded Bacynski's left ear and then knocked him out with punches to win the inaugural Cruiserweight World Lethwei Championship. Following his performance, Leduc was invited on The Joe Rogan Experience podcast by Joe Rogan and both men discussed Lethwei. Leduc announced that the WLC had plans to host an event in the United States.

On 7 November 2020, Leduc was challenged by American Cyrus Washington for the second and final time to determine who is the best foreign Lethwei fighter. The fight was under traditional Lethwei rules at the Outlaw Saloon in Cheyenne, Wyoming inside a cage and Leduc won the fight by TKO. Leduc retained the Lethwei openweight world title.

On January 29, 2023, Leduc officially vacated the openweight Lethwei World Championship title before the fight between Tun Tun Min and Thway Thit Win Hlaing. As soon as the fight started the title was up for grabs. In the event where the champion vacates the title, the two top contenders are required to fight for the belt. In these cases, in order to have a champion, the fight cannot end in a draw, a winner must obligatory be declared even if there is no knockout. Tway Thit Win Hlaing was awarded the title and succeeded Leduc as Myanmar openweight champion.

=== Retirement fight: Kun Khmer rules vs. Prom Samnang ===
In 2023, the World Lethwei Federation agreed for Prom Samnang from Cambodia to challenge Leduc because of his extensive winning streak in Kun Khmer. The match was scheduled to take place in Banská Bystrica, but was cancelled because Samnang was denied a Schengen visa to enter Slovakia.

In August 2023, Leduc announced that he was set to retire completely from professional fighting and will fight one more time under Kun Khmer in Cambodia. Leduc stated he would compete under Kun Khmer rules out of respect for the host country. Leduc invited the Prime Minister of Cambodia His Excellency Hun Manet to attend his match against Prom Samnang. Manet respond and agreed to meet Leduc when he comes to Kingdom of Cambodia.

On November 3, 2023, Leduc and Samnang were invited to the Peace Palace in Phnom Penh to meet with Prime Minister of Cambodia His Excellency Hun Manet. Manet was quoted saying that the match between the two fighters will reflect mutual respect and contribute to strengthen the ties of friendship between Cambodia and Myanmar and that this will raise awareness about Kun Khmer around the world the Cambodian Premier added. The Kun Khmer Federation (KKF) hired 10 assistant coaches to help Samnang in his preparation against Leduc. The match was referred as historic and the most anticipated fight of the year.

On November 5, 2023, Leduc and Samnang fought under Kun Khmer rules, 1 round of 9 minutes with ropes wrapped around their fists. Leduc dominated the majority of the fight and dropped Samnang with an overhand right. After nine minutes without a knockout, per MAS Fight rules, the fight was declared a draw. The fight was streamed online and watched live by over 15 million people.

== The Rise of Lethwei ==
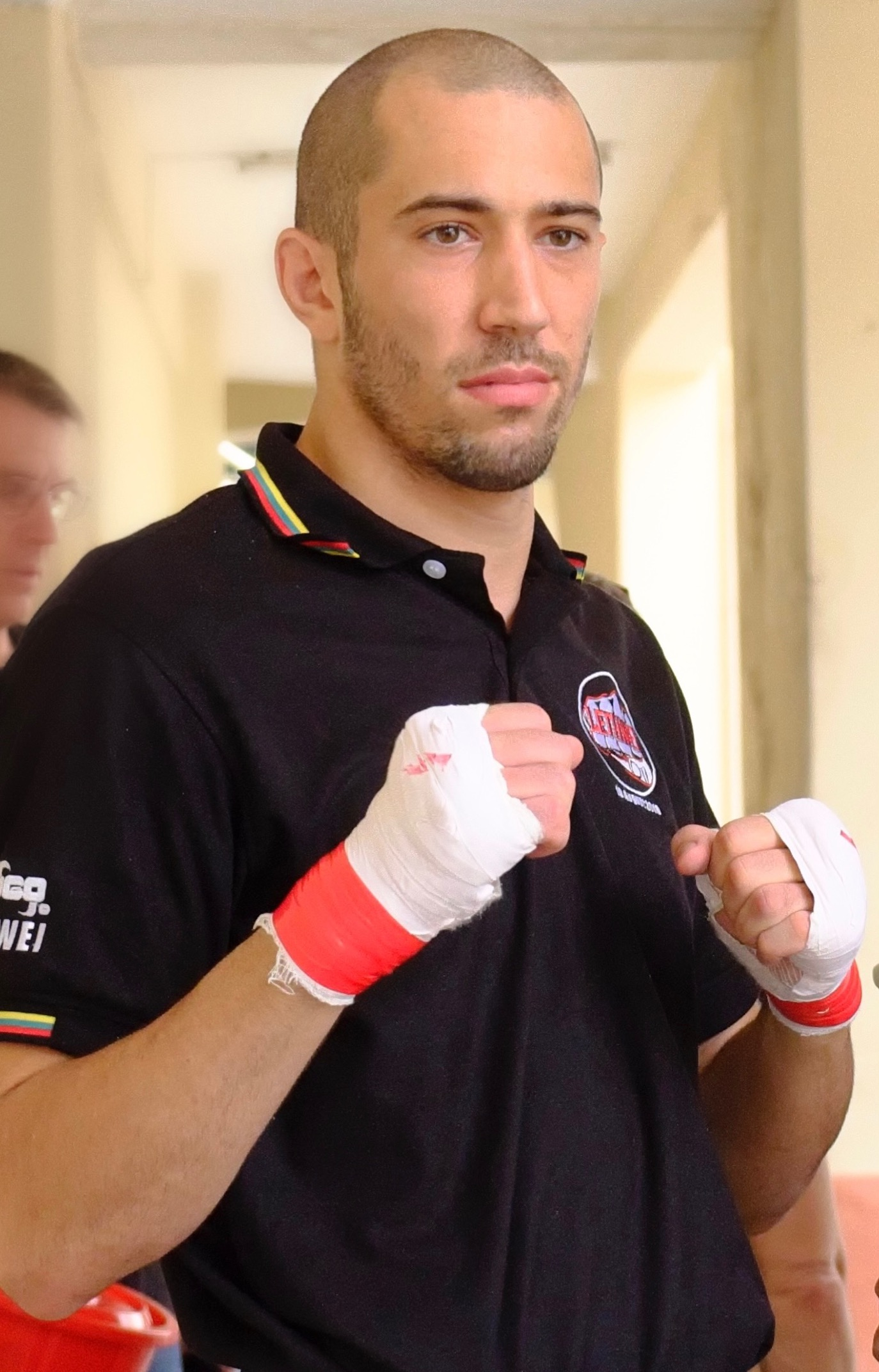
Leduc at Thein Pyu Stadium

Leduc is considered a pioneer of Lethwei. Leduc is referred to as the King of Lethwei. After winning the world title in 2016, Leduc dedicated his career to Lethwei and has been widely credited for the sport's rise in international popularity. Leduc expressed his hopes that Lethwei fighters will remain true to the traditions of the martial art as it grows in popularity. Leduc helped open gyms throughout Myanmar and promoted Lethwei outside of the country. On 8 October 2017, Myint Htwe, the Minister of Health and Sports of Myanmar awarded Leduc with a Certificate of Honor in recognition for his efforts as a proponent of Myanmar's national sport, being on the forefront of Lethwei's expansion internationally. Leduc is known for his elbows and headbutts as well as for his unpredictable and unorthodox style. He often taunts and provokes his opponents during the fight. Leduc has stated eating mohinga, enjoying playing a games of chinlone with locals and is known for wearing a longyi. He also has received the traditional Myanmar Lethwei Htoe Kwin leg tattoos. The majority of Burmese have accepted Leduc and welcomed the idea of having a non-native as the champion of their national sport. Leduc was given a Burmese name by fans and his known in Myanmar as Daywa (pronounced “day-wa”), which is a play on his name that can mean "protector",” or "angel of death". In 2020, Leduc helped bring the sport for the first time to the United States at the occasion of Dave Leduc vs. Cyrus Washington II. The CEO of ONE Championship, Chatri Sityodtong expressed interest in recruiting Leduc for his promotion, referring to him as "head-butting Lethwei 'monster'. Leduc stated that he would compete in ONE under Lethwei rules. "I need to stay focused on Lethwei. I like fighting with no gloves and with headbutts: that's my passion".

In 2020, Leduc became the first Lethwei fighter to make the cover of Karaté Bushido, the oldest magazine dedicated to martial arts in Europe. He followed martial artists such as Bruce Lee (1974), Jean-Claude Van Damme (1993), Bas Rutten (1997), Rickson Gracie (1998), Jackie Chan (2000), Fedor Emelianenko (2007), Georges St-Pierre (2008) and Jérôme Le Banner (2012) and Francis Ngannou (2019).

In 2022, Leduc became an ambassador for one of the world's largest online sportsbook 1xBet alongside FC Barcelona and Paris Saint-Germain. In 2024, Leduc was inducted in the Chelsea Wall of Fame alongside cyclist Michael Woods and runner Ray Zahab, in a permanent display at the Meredith Centre in Chelsea, Quebec.

Instructor lineage

Bruce Lee → James DeMile → Jaques Patenaude → Patrick Marcil → Dave Leduc

== Personal life ==
Leduc is married and has two sons named Captain (born 2022) and Askari (born 2024). In 2024, Leduc and his family moved to Cambodia. In 2025, he was seen in Phnom Penh being escorted by the elite security unit of the Royal Cambodian Armed Forces known as the Bodyguard Headquarters Unit (BHQ). Leduc is a vegan and believes that Veganism is the basis for the bettering of humans. He went initially vegan after watching The Game Changers and realizing it was ‘possible to thrive as an elite athlete on a plant-based diet’, but believes being vegan is a philosophy 'not a diet'.

=== Wedding ===
In 2016, Leduc met Moldovan writer and model Irina Terehova when she traveled to Thailand. The two had never met before, but after writing a story on Leduc, Terehova decided to leave Canada and meet him in Phuket. In October 2016, Leduc got engaged to Terehova on the Shwesandaw Pagoda in Bagan, Myanmar. On December 13, 2016, the couple got married in a nationally televised traditional wedding ceremony live on MRTV in Yangon, only two days after his world championship title fight. The ceremony was watched by approximately 30 million people in Myanmar which catapulted the couple to superstardom in Myanmar. In February 2023, Leduc and his wife renewed their wedding vows in Iceland in a ceremony officiated by Icelandic witch Sigga Kling. Leduc and his wife wore traditional Icelandic national costumes and the ceremony took place at Álftanesfjara, a sacred beach facing Snæfellsjökull. Despite challenging weather conditions, including a yellow weather warning, the couple proceeded with the ceremony.

=== Charity ===
In 2017, Leduc and his wife started getting involved with orphan children who are affected with HIV and AIDS at the NLD AIDS Center in Myanmar, bringing food treats, as well as undisclosed donations. In 2021 and 2025, Leduc campaigned on social media to raise awareness and raised money for people who were victims of Myanmar military coup and the 2025 Myanmar earthquake.

== Controversy ==
=== Burmese bank note ===
Image of the 1000-kyats Bank note with Leduc.

In 2018, Leduc posted a fan art on social media, showing of a 1000-kyats note with a picture of him suggesting that the Central Bank of Myanmar was issuing a sports celebratory note with him on it. The announcement outraged the population in Myanmar because of the sensitive nature of the issue. In the 1990s, the military regime tried to eradicate all traces of General Aung San's memory, considered the father of modern-day Myanmar and who was assassinated by political rivals six months before independence on January 4, 1948. After the 8888 Uprising, the government redesigned the national currency removing the picture of General Aung San, replacing it with Chinthe and elephants. Leduc received multiple threats and was severely criticized for posting the picture, before going public and explaining the strategy behind his stunt, stating that his goal was "to revive the debate about bringing back Aung San on the currency". Leduc mentioned to Canadian newspaper Le Droit, that the Myanmar population was very receptive and understood the tactic behind his stunt. On 4 January 2020, to mark the 72nd anniversary of Myanmar's Independence Day, the Central Bank of Myanmar issued a new 1000-kyats notes displaying General Aung San after being absent for 30 years.

=== Banned from Thailand ===
On April 28, 2021, Leduc stirred controversy with a profanity-laced social media post saying that Muaythai was "softened version of Burmese Boxing", criticized Muay Thai fighter Buakaw Banchamek and stating claims surrounding the Nai Khanom Tom folklore story were false and that he was simply a prisoner in ancient Burma during the Burmese–Siamese War. The post sparked considerable backlash from the Muaythai and combat sports community. In a letter, the Myanmar Lethwei Federation explained that Muaythai promoters made a complaint about Leduc. Prominent Thai Muaythai promoter Nuttadaj Vachirarattanawong urged the MLF to reprimand Leduc. The MLF judged that Leduc had "committed personal attacks" on Buakaw Banchamek and Muaythai history, potentially "tarnishing the relationship between Myanmar and Thailand". The federation issued Leduc a two-year ban on Lethwei competitions under their federation. Leduc made fun of the Muay Thai folklore figure Nai Khanom Tom for being captured by Burmese troops during the Burmese–Siamese War (1765–1767). In May 2021, the Ministry of Culture of Thailand blacklisted Leduc from entering Thailand. In May 2023, Leduc accused "Thai spies" of poisoning him after eating at a Thai restaurant in Turkey.

=== COVID measures militancy ===
On December 20, 2020, Leduc gave a speech to thousands of Canadians gathered at a peaceful demonstration in La Fontaine Park in Montreal. He requested a public debate with unsponsored medical experts and asked for governmental transparency in regards of the sanitary measures imposed on the population in response of COVID-19 pandemic in Quebec. After his speech, while Leduc was giving an interview, multiple agents of the SPVM police force started to surround him and detained him. Leduc received a fine of 1546 CAD$ for not wearing a facial covering outside.

In 2021, Leduc had become a leading activist opposing the health measures surrounding COVID-19 pandemic in Quebec. In May, the government-sponsored media Radio-Canada commissioned a documentary to better understand the dissident movement led by Leduc and three other Quebec personalities that rejected the measures imposed by the government. The documentary was a finalist for the Prix Gémeaux. In 2022, Leduc was featured in the study conducted the UNESCO Chairs in Quebec entitled "The conspiracy movement in Quebec: Leaders, discourses and adherence" presented to the Quebec Ministry of Economy and Innovation.

== Television ==
=== The Amazing Race Canada ===
In 2019, before headlining WLC 9, Leduc competed with his wife Irina Terehova on The Amazing Race Canada Season 7. The couple made it clear that they weren't on the show for the prize money or to make friends, it was apparently Leduc's desire since teenage to compete on the show. Undoubtedly the most controversial seasons of the Canadian franchise, Dave & Irina became the most notorious villains the franchise has known, while being practically unbeatable for the entire season. The couple outraged a lot of viewers and were deemed "un-Canadian". They fell out of favour of viewers and fellow racers for their cutthroat way of racing, copying an answer at the Horne Lake Caves Provincial Park and stealing cabs in Yellowknife, Northwest Territories. The couple later revealed receiving death threats when the show aired. They generated a remarkable amount of hate from Canadian viewers for referring to other contestants as peasants. After arriving first in Edmonton, Alberta, Leduc said "We'll let the peasants fight for last place.", which became the title of episode 3.

In the first episode of the season, in Kamloops, British Columbia, the couple quickly stood out and became the season's villains after trash-talking Canada's Choice Jet & Dave. Jet told Leduc about being a firefighter which he replied "That's great because you will be back there next week.", which ended up being true. In the fifth episode, in Nanaimo, Vancouver Island, the remaining contestants teamed up and tried send the Quebec couple home, but as Leduc said, it was a "drastic failure." Despite a well-laid plan against the couple and a record number of penalties taken by multiple teams, it was ultimately the Halifax twins who got eliminated. Dave and Irina led the charge out of Thunder Bay to Wolfville, Nova Scotia, but faltered at the apple sorting challenge and were eventually the last team to meet host Jon Montgomery at the mat at Luckett Vineyards.

== Filmography ==
Year	Title	Role	Notes
2017	Prison Fighters: Five Rounds to Freedom	Himself	Prison Fighters at IMDb
2017	La Fosse aux Tigres	Biographic role	La Fosse aux Tigres at IMDb
2018	Into Dave's Fist	Himself	Canal+ Myanmar documentary
2019	Denis Lévesque	Himself	Denis Lévesque at IMDb
2019	Myanmar Lethwei and Me	Himself	Canal+ Myanmar documentary
2019	Power & Martial Arts : Lethwei	Himself	Power & Martial Arts at IMDb
2019	The Amazing Race Canada	Himself	Season 7 at IMDb
2019	The Joe Rogan Experience	Himself	JRE MMA Show #81 at IMDb
2019	Mike Ward : Sous écoute	Himself	Sous écoute at IMDb
2019	Underground	Mafia boss	Myanmar movie in Burmese
2020	Inactive, Americaʼs Silent Killer	Himself	Inactive at IMDb
2021	Convictions	Himself	Convictions at IMDb

== Championships and accomplishments ==
Championships

- Lethwei World Champion
  - Openweight Lethwei Golden Belt
    - Nine successful title defenses Vacated in 2023
- Air KBZ Aung Lan Championship
  - Air KBZ Aung Lan Championship 2016, 2017 & 2018
    - Two successful title defenses Vacated in 2019
- International Lethwei Federation Japan
  - ILFJ Openweight World Championship (1 time, inaugural) Vacated in 2019
- Myanmar Lethwei World Championship
  - MLWC Openweight World Championship (1 time) Vacated in 2019
- World Lethwei Championship
  - WLC Cruiserweight World Championship (1 time, inaugural)
- Sparta Sports and Entertainment
  - Sparta Lethwei Championship

Awards, records, and honours

- Lethwei
  - First non-Burmese Golden Belt champion
  - Certificate of honor awarded by Myint Htwe, Minister of Health and Sports of Myanmar
  - Competed in the first Lethwei World Championship title fight in North America vs. Cyrus Washington
  - First Lethwei fighter on the Cover of Karaté Bushido magazine
  - 2019 Top 10 Sport Moments in Canada's National Capital Region
  - 2024 Chelsea Wall of Fame Inductee
- World Lethwei Championship
  - 2019 Top 3 Knockout of the Year
  - 2019 Fight of the Year vs. Seth Baczynski at WLC 9
- Lethwei World
  - 2019 Lethwei Person of the Year
  - 2019 Event of the Year headlined at WLC 9
- Spia Asia Awards
  - 2019 Best Sport Tourism Destination Campaign - Bronze headlined at WLC 9
- Asian Academy Awards
  - 2019 Best Sport Program - National Winner headlined at WLC 9

== Lethwei record ==
Professional Lethwei record
6 wins (6 (T)KOs), 0 losses, 6 draws
Date	Result	Opponent	Event	Location	Method	Round	Time
2020-11-07	Win	(United States) Cyrus Washington	Dave Leduc vs. Cyrus Washington II	Cheyenne, Wyoming	TKO	4	2:40
Defends Openweight Lethwei Golden Belt & wins Sparta Lethwei Championship
2019-08-02	Win	(United States) Seth Baczynski	WLC 9: King of Nine Limbs	Mandalay, Myanmar	KO	2	2:35
Wins Inaugural WLC Cruiserweight World Championship & Defends Openweight Lethwei Golden Belt
2018-12-16	Draw	(Myanmar) Tun Tun Min	2018 Air KBZ Grand Final Myanmar Championship	Yangon, Myanmar	Draw	5	
2018-08-19	Win	(Thailand) Diesellek TopkingBoxing	2018 Myanmar Lethwei World Championship	Yangon, Myanmar	KO	1	2:23
Wins Openweight Myanmar Lethwei World Championship Title & Defends Openweight Lethwei Golden Belt
2017-12-10	Draw	(France) Corentin Jallon	2017 Air KBZ Aung Lan Championship	Yangon, Myanmar	Draw	5	
2017-08-20	Draw	(United States) Cyrus Washington	2017 Myanmar Lethwei World Championship	Yangon, Myanmar	Draw	5	
2017-06-16	Win	(Thailand) Nilmungkorn Sudsakorngym	Lethwei in Japan 4: Frontier	Tokyo, Japan	KO	2	2:23
Wins ILFJ Openweight World Championship
2017-04-18	Draw	(Australia) Adem Yilmaz	Lethwei in Japan 3: Grit	Tokyo, Japan	Draw	5	
2017-02-16	Win	(Myanmar) Phoe Kay	Lethwei in Japan 2: Legacy	Tokyo, Japan	KO	2	2:32
2016-12-11	Win	(Myanmar) Tun Tun Min	2016 Air KBZ Aung Lan Championship	Yangon, Myanmar	TKO (Forfeit)	3	2:34
Wins Openweight Lethwei Golden Belt & Air KBZ Aung Lan Championship
2016-10-09	Draw	(Myanmar) Tun Tun Min	GTG International Challenge Fights	Yangon, Myanmar	Draw	5	
2016-08-21	Draw	(Myanmar) Too Too	2016 Myanmar Lethwei World Championship	Yangon, Myanmar	Draw	5	
Legend: Win Loss Draw/no contest Notes

== Kun Khmer record ==
Professional Kun Khmer record
0 wins, 0 loss, 1 draw
Date	Result	Opponent	Event	Location	Method	Round	Time
November 5, 2023	Draw	(Cambodia) Prom Samnang	Dave Leduc vs. Prom Samnang	Phnom Penh, Cambodia	Draw (Time Limit)	1	9:00
Myanmar-Cambodia Friendship fight
Legend: Win Loss Draw/no contest Notes

== Muay Thai record ==
Professional Muaythai record
15 wins (13 (T)KOs), 1 loss
Date	Result	Opponent	Event	Location	Method	Round	Time
2016-09-12	Win	(Thailand) Sakchay Saksoonton	Patong Boxing Stadium	Phuket, Thailand	TKO	2	
2016-06-22	Win	(Thailand) Pechsila	Bangla Boxing Stadium	Phuket, Thailand	TKO	3	
2016-06-05	Win	(Iran) Farhad Alamdarnezam	Rawai Boxing stadium	Phuket, Thailand	KO	2	
2016-05-14	Win	(Thailand) Sakchay Saksoonton	Rawai Boxing stadium	Phuket, Thailand	KO	5	
2016-04-25	Win	(Thailand) Chaiyo Thalangyanyeung	Patong Boxing stadium	Phuket, Thailand	KO	2	
2016-04-02	Win	(Brazil) Carlos Prates	Rawai Boxing Stadium	Phuket, Thailand	Decision	5	
2016-03-14	Win	(Germany) Hiden Dragon Muay Thai	Bangla Boxing Stadium	Phuket, Thailand	KO	2	
2016-02-16	Win	(Thailand) Kwangpet For Vichanchai	Rawai Boxing Stadium	Phuket, Thailand	KO	3	
2016-01-16	Win	(Thailand) Dennua Aawut	Patong Boxing Btadium	Phuket, Thailand	KO	2	
2014-07-12	Win	(Thailand) Thahan Chor.Chatchai	Prison Fight	Klongpai Central Prison, Thailand	Decision	3	
2014-06-29	Win	(Russia) Vladislav Markov	Bangla Boxing Stadium	Phuket, Thailand	KO	1	
2014-05-16	Win	(England) Anthony Yudtajak	Bangla Boxing Stadium	Phuket, Thailand	KO	4	
2014-03-12	Loss	(Australia) Jake Lund	Bangla Boxing Stadium	Phuket, Thailand	Decision	5	
2014-02-26	Win	(Chile) Andres Da Forno	Bangla Boxing Stadium	Phuket, Thailand	TKO	2	
2014-02-17	Win	(Thailand) Jackrid Sitkrujaroon	Patong Boxing Stadium	Phuket, Thailand	KO	1	
2013-03-29	Win	(South Korea) James Lion Muaythai	Bangla Boxing Stadium	Phuket, Thailand	TKO	2	
Legend: Win Loss Draw/No contest Notes

== Mixed martial arts record ==
Professional MMA record
0 wins (0 (T)KOs), 2 loss
Date	Result	Opponent	Event	Location	Method	Round	Time
May 2, 2015	Loss	(Japan) Koyomi Matsushima	Hybrid Pro Series 3	Gatineau, Canada	TKO (punches)	1	0:19
November 15, 2014	Loss	(Canada) Jonathan Meunier	Hybrid Pro Series 2	Gatineau, Canada	TKO (punches)	1	3:36
Legend: Win Loss Draw/no contest Notes

Amateur MMA record
3 wins (0 (T)KOs), 0 loss
Date	Result	Opponent	Event	Location	Method	Round	Time
June 29, 2013	Win	(Japan) Yukinori Akazawa	Fightquest 25	Kahnawake, Canada	Decision (unanimous)	3	3:00
June 1, 2013	Win	(Canada) Jared Albu	Hybrid 17	Gatineau, Canada	Submission (guillotine choke)	3	1:05
February 23, 2013	Win	(Canada) Mitch Beekman	Hybrid 16	Gatineau, Canada	Submission (guillotine choke)	1	2:37
Legend: Win Loss Draw/no contest Notes

== See also ==
- List of Lethwei fighters

Awards and achievements
Preceded by Tun Tun Min	Openweight Lethwei World Champion; December 11, 2016 - January 29, 2023; Vacated	Succeeded by Thway Thit Win Hlaing
New championship	WLC Cruiserweight World Champion; August 2, 2019 – February 1, 2021	Vacant WLC defunct due to 2021 Myanmar coup d'état
