= Diesellek TopkingBoxing =

Thai Muay Thai fighter

- Born: May 9, 1985 (age 41); Kalasin, Isan, Thailand
- Other names: Diesellek Rungruangyon; Diesellek SootRaaengGeert; Diesellek Seepongsert Sanong; Diesellek Pitakpaphadaeng; Diesellek Por.Phasuk; Diesellek Seardammhooplara
- Nationality: Thai
- Height: 1.78 m (5 ft 10 in)
- Weight: 80 kg (176 lb; 12 st 8 lb)
- Division: Welterweight; Middleweight; Light Middleweight
- Style: Muay Thai
- Stance: Orthodox
- Fighting out of: Bangkok, Thailand
- Team: Galaxy Gym

Kickboxing record
- Total: 164
- Wins: 126
- Losses: 35
- Draws: 3

Diesellek TopkingBoxing (born May 9, 1985) is a Thai Muaythai fighter. He is a former Rajadamnern Stadium, WMPF and IKF World Champion.

== Early career ==
Born in Kalasin, near Roi Et, Thailand. Diessellek started fighting at the age of eleven. At the age of 15, he joined the Top King Boxing gym in Samut Sakhon, 30 km south of Bangkok.

== Career ==
=== Muaythai ===
On 31 January 2015, won by decision against Samy Sana in Nancy, France.

On 3 March 2012, Diesellek knocked out former Lumpini Stadium and Rajadamnern Stadium champion Youssef Boughanem with his left kick at Lumpini Stadium.

On 20 June 2008, Diesellek won the International Kickboxing Federation (IKF) World Title against Marco Piqué in Montego Bay, Jamaica. On September 15, 2017, the IKF stripped him of the title due to inactivity.

=== Lethwei ===
On 19 August 2018, at the occasion of the 3rd Myanmar Lethwei World Championship (MLWC), Diesellek faced current Lethwei World Champion Dave Leduc inside the Thein Pyu Stadium in Yangon, Myanmar. Both fighters weighed-in at the exact same weight of 79.7 kg. The matchup was mediatized as Lethwei vs Muaythai and Leduc won by knockout at 2:23 of the first round.

== Titles and achievements ==
- World Professional Muaythai Federation
  - WPMF World Title
- International Kickboxing Federation
  - IKF Light Middleweight World Champion
- Rajadamnern Stadium
  - 70 kg Rajadamnern Stadium Champion (2008)

== Muay Thai record ==
Professional Muay Thai record
126 Wins , 36 Losses, 3 Draws
Date	Result	Opponent	Event	Location	Method	Round	Time
2020-09-02	Loss	(Brazil) Carlos Prates	Muay Hardcore	Bangkok, Thailand	KO (Knee to the body)	1	2:52
2020-01-05	Loss	(United States) Paul Banasiak	Super Champ Muay Thai	Bangkok, Thailand	Decision	3	3:00
2019-11-24	Win	(Iran) Mohsen Kordalivand	Super Champ Muay Thai	Bangkok, Thailand	Decision	3	3:00
2018-12-15	Loss	(France) Yohan Lidon	La Nuit des Challenges	France	Decision	5	3:00
2018-10-28	Win	(Iran) Keivan Soleimani	Super Champ Muay Thai	Bangkok, Thailand	Decision	3	3:00
2016-04-02	Loss	(Australia) Toby Smith	Domination 17	Australia	KO (Right Elbow)	3	
2015-10-24	Win	(France) Tomas Mendez	Kings of Muay Thai 8	Luxembourg	Decision	5	3:00
2015-05-23	Loss	(Australia) Millad Farzad	Nemesis 10	Australia	Decision (Split)	5	3:00
2015-01-31	Win	(France) Samy Sana	Emperor Chok Dee	Nancy, France	Decision	5	3:00
2014-03-15	Win	(Brazil) Amadeu Christiano	King Naresuan Muay Thai	Australia	Decision	5	3:00
2014-03-15	Win	(Australia) Kim Olsen	Epic 10 Pressure	Australia	Decision	5	3:00
2013-11-18	Win	(Australia) Samuel Ballantyne	Nemesis	Australia	Decision	5	3:00
2013-10-26	Win	(Australia) Mark Lucchiri	Real Hero Muay Thai	Sydney, Australia	Decision	5	3:00
2012-03-24	Win	(Belgium) Youssef Boughanem	Lumpini Stadium - Muaydee Vitheethai	Bangkok, Thailand	KO	2	
2011-06-11	Loss	(China) Bing Xiang	Wushu vs. Muaythai	Hefei, China	Decision	5	3:00
2011-05-28	Loss	(Slovakia) Vladimir Moravcik	Profiliga MuayThai XI.	Banská Bystrica, Slovakia	KO	4	1:51
2011-02-19	Loss	(Thailand) Dernchonlek Sor Sor Niyom	Omnoi Stadium - Isuzu Tournament	Bangkok, Thailand	TKO (Knees)	3	
2010-06-05	Loss	(France) Yohan Lidon	La Nuit Des Challenges 8	Saint-Fons, France	Decision	5	3:00
2010-01-05	Win	(Thailand) Prakaisaeng Sit Or.	Lumpini Stadium - Petchpiya	Bangkok, Thailand	Decision	5	3:00
2009-10-02	Loss	(France) Steeve Valente		Germany	Decision	5	3:00
2009-03-02	Loss	(Thailand) Kem Sitsongpeenong	Rajadamnern Stadium - Paorungchujaroen fights	Bangkok, Thailand	Decision (Unanimous)	5	3:00
For the WMC World Championship -70kg
2009-01-21	Win	(France) Jonathan Camara	Muaythai Federation WPMF World Title	Montego Bay, Jamaica	Decision	5	3:00
Wins the World Professional Muaythai Federation WPMF World Title
2008-12-13	Win	(Germany) Alex Schmitt	The Champions Club Germany 2008	Bamberg, Germany	Decision	5	3:00
	Win	(Thailand) Attachai Fairtex		Bangkok, Thailand	Decision	5	3:00
2008-08-16	Loss	(United Kingdom) Steve Wakeling	Muay Thai Legnds	United Kingdom	Decision	5	3:00
2008-06-20	Win	(Netherlands) Marco Piqué	International Muay Thai Fight Night	Montego Bay, Jamaica	Decision	5	3:00
Wins the International Kickboxing Federation IKF World Title
2008-05	Win	(Thailand) Big Ben Chor Praram 6	Rajadamnern Stadium	Bangkok, Thailand	Decision	5	3:00
Wins the Rajadamnern Stadium 70kg Title
2008-02-25	Win	(Thailand) Big Ben Chor Praram 6	Jarumueng, Rajadamnern Stadium	Bangkok, Thailand	Decision	5	3:00
2008-02-04	Win	(Thailand) Nontachai Sit-O	Rajadamnern Stadium	Bangkok, Thailand	Decision	5	3:00
2007-12-30	Win	(Thailand) Big Ben Chor Rachadakorn	Chucharoen + True Visions 62, Rajadamnern Stadium	Bangkok, Thailand	Decision	5	3:00
	Loss	(Japan) Masaki Sato	Lumpinee Stadium	Bangkok, Thailand	KO (Low Kicks)		
	Win	(Thailand) Saiyok Pumpanmuang		Bangkok, Thailand	Decision	5	3:00
	Loss	(Thailand) Saiyok Pumpanmuang		Bangkok, Thailand	Decision	5	3:00
Legend: Win Loss Draw/No contest Notes

== Lethwei record ==
Professional Lethwei record
0 wins (0 (T)KOs), 1 loss, 0 draws
Date	Result	Opponent	Event	Location	Method	Round	Time
2018-08-19	Loss	(Myanmar) Dave Leduc	2018 Myanmar Lethwei World Championship	Yangon, Myanmar	KO	1	2:23
For the Openweight Myanmar Lethwei World Championship
Legend: Win Loss Draw/No contest Notes

== Kun Khmer record ==
Professional Kun Khmer record
0 wins (0 (T)KOs), 1 loss, 0 draws
Date	Result	Opponent	Event	Location	Method	Round	Time
2016-11-27	Loss	(Cambodia) Prom Samnang	World Kun Khmer Event	Phnom Penh, Cambodia	Decision	5	3:00
Legend: Win Loss Draw/No contest Notes

== See also ==
- List of male kickboxers
