= Thailand VS Challenger Series =

Thailand combat competition

- Type: Private
- Industry: Muay Thai promotion
- Founded: 2010
- Founder: Toli Makris, Seth Fishman DVM
- Headquarters: 406-502 Amarin Plaza 10th Floor, Ploenchit Rd, Lumpinee, Pathumwan, Bangkok, 10330 Thailand
- Key people: H.E. General Pichit Kullavanijaya (Chairman); Toli Makris (Promoter); Seth Fishman DVM (CEO); Songchai Ratanasuban (Consultant); Stephan Fox (Consultant)
- Owner: Elite Boxing Company Limited.
- Website: http://www.elite-boxing.com

The Thailand VS Challenger (TVC) Series is a Bangkok-based muaythai promotion which was officially launched on 16 January 2010. TVC is produced and promoted by Elite Boxing (EB), headed by Promoter, Toli Makris, and co-founder, Seth Fishman DVM.

== The Thailand VS Challenger (TVC) Series Concept ==
Thailand VS Challenger (TVC) was developed to meet the growing demands of muaythai and combat sports fans across the globe for a stand-up fighting event series.

The concept of TVC is to have an elite Thai national team taking on the best muaythai fighters from around the world in a series of regional challenges. TVC events are held at large venues internationally.

== TVC History ==
Before TVC entered the market, the sport of muaythai was largely undeveloped. In Thailand, muaythai catered primarily to working class Thais with events held in run-down old stadiums. Although muaythai had some international appeal, the lack of an internationally recognized brand prevented the sport from reaching its global potential.

Since its launch in January 2010, TVC has gone a long way towards achieving its number one objective of becoming the world's number one muaythai brand by offering fight fans a superior entertainment experience in a safe and comfortable environment.

Playing on national pride and adding a higher level of commercialization to the sport, TVC has been able to expand the reach of muaythai by attracting a new generation of fans as well as tapping into the huge global market of combat sports fans.

Following an extravagant Grand Opening to the inaugural TVC Series at Siam Paragon in Bangkok in January 2010, a number of successful TVC events have been held in Thailand, Malaysia, Germany and U.A.E.

== Television Broadcast ==
Each TVC event is televised worldwide through a network of broadcast partners. TVC events are broadcast across Asia by ESPN/Star Sports as part of a 5-year agreement. Eurosport broadcasts TVC events in Europe.

For domestic broadcasts, TVC also collaborates with local television stations. Since 2012, TVC has also been working with Astro Malaysia, while TRUE Sports cover TVC events in Thailand.

Elite Boxing is currently negotiating with additional broadcasters with the aim of expanding its global reach to include 180 countries by 2014.

== Events ==
Event	Date	Venue	City
TVC 2010
Thailand VS Challenger Grand Opening 2010	January 16, 2010	Royal Paragon Hall	Bangkok, Thailand
Thailand VS Challenger Queen's Cup 2010	August 12, 2010	Sanam Luang	Bangkok, Thailand
Thailand VS Germany 2010	November 14, 2010	Blautal-Center	Ulm, Germany
Thailand VS Middle East 2010	November 25, 2010	Dusit Dubai	(United Arab Emirates) Dubai, UAE
TVC 2011
Thailand VS Challenger Grand Opening 2011	July 23, 2011	River City Shopping Complex	Bangkok, Thailand
Thailand VS Challenger Queen's Cup 2011	August 12, 2011	Bangkok Metropolitan Administration	Bangkok, Thailand
Thailand VS Europe 2011	September 17, 2011	Carl Benz Center	Stuttgart, Germany
Thailand VS Germany 2011	November 6, 2010	Blautal-Center	Ulm, Germany
TVC 2012
Thailand VS Germany 2012	September 15, 2012	Congress Centrum Heidenheim	Heidenheim, Germany
Thailand VS Asia 2012	October 9, 2012	Sunway Pyramid	Bandar Sunway, Malaysia
TVC 2013
Thailand VS Europe 2013	March 23, 2013	Ratiopharm Arena Nue-Ulm	Ulm, Germany

== Fighters ==
=== Thai Team ===
- 1. (Thailand) Changpuek Sor.KeawSuek
- 2. (Thailand) Kaoklai Kaennorsing
- 3. (Thailand) Saiyok Pumpanmuang
- 4. (Thailand) Nonsai Sor. Sanyakorn
- 5. (Thailand) Armin Pumpanmuang Windy Sport
- 6. (Thailand) Mardsua Lamai Gym

=== Challengers ===
- 1. (Russia) Dzhabar Askerov
- 2. (Suriname) Marco Piqué
- 3. (Australia) Bruce Macfie
- 4. (France) Antuan Siangboxing
- 5. (Germany) Alex Vogel
- 6. (United States) Cyrus Washington
