= Dave Leduc vs. Tun Tun Min III =

- Date: December 16, 2018
- Venue: Thein Pyu Stadium, Yangon, Myanmar
- Title(s) on the line: Openweight Golden Belt and lineal Openweight titles

Tale of the tape
Boxer	(Myanmar) Dave Leduc	(Myanmar) Tun Tun Min
Nickname	"The Steel Giraffe"	"The Bull"
Hometown	Quebec, Canada	Mon State, Myanmar
Pre-fight record	4–0–5 (4 KOs)	55–2–17 (55 KOs)
Age	27 years	26 years, 2 months
Height	1.88 m (6 ft 2 in)	1.76 m (5 ft 9 in)
Weight	79.65 kg (175.6 lb)	79.5 kg (175 lb)
Style	Orthodox	Orthodox
Recognition	Reigning Openweight Lethwei World Champion	Former Openweight Lethwei World Champion; Youngest fighter to win the Openweight Golden Belt.

Result
- Draw; Tun Tun Min gets knocked out at 2:30 of the first round, uses his 2 minutes injury time-out. After 5 rounds, fight is declared a draw with both man standing. Dave Leduc retains the Openweight Golden Belt

Dave Leduc vs. Tun Tun Min III, also known as The Biggest Fight In Lethwei History, was a Lethwei world title match between reigning Openweight Lethwei World Champion Dave Leduc and former Openweight Lethwei World Champion Tun Tun Min that took place at Thein Pyu Stadium in Yangon, Myanmar, on December 16, 2018.

The rivalry started in 2016 and this bout was the third fight of the trilogy. Tun Tun Min was knocked out for over 40 seconds by an elbow of Leduc at 2:30 of the first round, and used his 2-minute injury time-out to get back in the fight. The fight ended in a draw according to traditional rules and marked Leduc's 7th consecutive successful title defence. Leduc was seen fighting under the Myanmar flag out of the red corner, marking the first time in Lethwei history for a non-Burmese to fight from the red corner against a Burmese native.

== Background ==
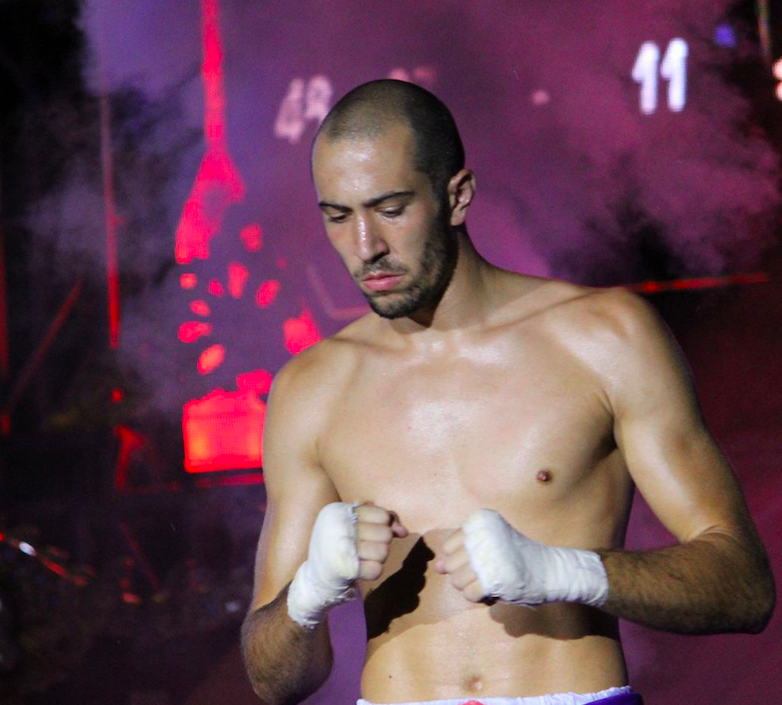
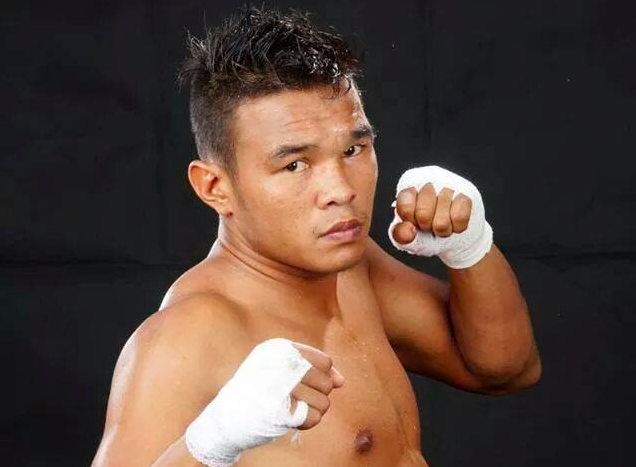
Dave Leduc (left) and Tun Tun Min (right)

Leduc and Tun Tun Min facing off at the weight ins

The potential trilogy between Leduc and Tun Tun Min had been talked about and promoted since 2016 prior to the fight, including by the two fighters themselves on social media. After his loss to Leduc in 2016, Tun Tun Min admitted he had considered leaving the sport, but he changed his mind, assuming his patriotic duty of taking the Lethwei crown from a foreign fighter. “That’s why I'm going to fight Dave. I will fight with patriotic spirit,” Tun Tun Min said on Anadolu Agency. In November 2018, it was reported that the two parties were negotiating a potential rematch between Leduc and Tun Tun Min.

On September 17, 2018, a special letter was sent from the Myanmar Traditional Lethwei Federation to Dave Leduc indicating that he had to accept the rematch and defend his title against Tun Tun Min or he would be stripped. “If you refuse to fight Tun Tun Min in December 2018, then the Myanmar Traditional Boxing federation will revoke your title and choose a suitable opponent for Tun Tun Min. The winner of the match will be officially recognized as the Myanmar Lethwei Champion.” - MTLF President stated. Leduc was in the middle of conducting a seminar world tour and saying the timing sucks but couldn't wait to face his nemesis again. Leduc stated that he must accept all challenges. "I would prefer fighting foreigners to show the true power of Lethwei against other martial arts, but former champ Tun Tun Min challenged me. I accepted his challenge and we will meet on Dec 16 in Yangon," Leduc said.

Tun Tun Min lost the Lethwei Golden Belt in his second fight with Leduc and said “I am still young and I wanted to stay as an Openweight Champion and Myanmar Champion for a long time. So when I lost to Dave, I was devastated and really depressed. I thought that I won’t be able to fight Lethwei again because of the knee injury I got when I was fighting Dave." "Yes, you can say this is the biggest fight in Lethwei history. Nearly the entire country is very interested in this match and they want to see who will be the victor at the end of the match,” said Tun Tun Min to Fox Sports Asia. Leduc's openweight Golden Belt and the title of reigning openweight champion would be put on the line. The fight was considered the biggest fight in the history of the sport. Tun Tun Min said to the Myanmar Times that the champion should be a Burmese which angered Leduc, to which Leduc replied "I eat like a Burmese, I dress like a Burmese. I got married in Myanmar. I help communities here." Leduc added, "This fight, I make it a personal matter. I knew that a rematch was going to happen, one day or another. It had to happen. I want to end it once and for all. With all that has been said on social media by both of us, it will be to see who will live up to their words... I am very proud. I trained hard. I can't wait to make history." At the weigh-in, Leduc tipped the scale at 79.65 kg, with Tun Tun Min at 79.5 kg.

== Fight details ==
On December 16, 2018, the highly anticipated third match between Tun Tun Min took place at the Air KBZ Aung Lan Golden Belt Championship in Yangon. The third fight saw Leduc fighting out of the red corner, the first time a foreigner has been able to do so in the history of Lethwei, as it is customary to have non-Burmese fighters come out of the blue corner. Leduc was cornered by Patrick Marcil. Tun Tun Min was fully recovered, but had once again had tremendous difficulty with the reach and distance control of Leduc. At 1:28 seconds of the first round, Leduc landed a headbutt to the temple in the clinch which floored Tun Tun Min, but managed to get up at the count of eight.

Tun Tun Min came back to the fight visibly frustrated at not being able to land on Dave leading him to attempt a flying roundhouse kick and other acrobatic feats in an attempt to slow down his rival. At the 2:35 of the same round, Leduc executed a jumping elbow strike and knocked out Tun Tun Min for 43 second. The later rounds saw both boxers vying for a finish but ended without another knockout at the final bell and Leduc retained his title. The latter rounds saw both boxers vying for a finish but end without a winner at the final bell. Leduc retained the Lethwei Golden Belt.

== Viewership ==
In October 2016, the first fight was initially broadcast on MRTV, one of the three free-to-air television channels in Myanmar, accessible by over 90 percent of the country's viewers. It was available to viewers with satellite or terrestrial DVB-T2 decoders and also in OTT platform and PyonePlay.

In December 2016, for the much anticipated rematch, the promoters switched to Sky Net Direct to Home (DTH), a Satellite television pay TV operator who provides nationwide in Myanmar by Shwe Than Lwin Media Co., Ltd.

In December 2018, the trilogy fight would also be televised by Sky Net DTH. There was organized public screenings at venues such as bars, restaurants and private homes all across Myanmar. Due to the high demand, there were some fears that Sky Net would not be able to provide the advertised level of quality with the amount of bandwidth needed. However, no technical issues have been reported. Canal+ Myanmar also produced a short documentary, Into Dave's Fist, focusing on the Leduc's preparation for the fight.

Due to the fight being solely broadcast in Myanmar, it was expected that fans would seek unauthorized streams of the fight. Sky Net gave notices to Facebook pages who illegally streamed the fight in violation of its copyrights an estimated 10.35 million viewers illegally streamed the fight. The fight recorded the highest viewership in history of Lethwei and was watched by a cumulative 37 million people.

== Purses ==
In December 2018, Dave Leduc reported in an interview that he earned more than 400 Million Burmese kyats ~US$300,000 (equivalent to US$398,000 in 2026) for the fight. Both men signed NDAs barring them from publicly communicating the exact financial details. As the challenger, former champion Tun Tun Min was expected to have earned significantly less than Leduc who was the defending champion.

== Golden Belt ==
For Lethwei fighters, the traditional Golden Belt is regarded as the highest and most prestigious award.

There is only one Golden Belt champion for each weight categories, with the Openweight class champion being considered the strongest Lethwei fighter in the world. The Openweight Champion is the equivalent of being pound-for-pound champion in the world of Lethwei. Leduc retained the Openweight Golden Belt.

== Officials and rules ==
The official for the fight:

- Referee: Zarni Sin Yine

The fight was sanctioned by the Myanmar Traditional Lethwei Federation under Traditional rules.

Both athletes agreed to the weight limit of 176 lbs; 80 kg.

Preceded by vs. Diesellek TopkingBoxing	Dave Leduc's bouts December 16, 2018	Succeeded by vs. Seth Baczynski
Preceded by vs. Daryl Lokuku	Tun Tun Min's bouts December 16, 2018	Succeeded by vs. Thaneelek Lookkromluang
