= Theinphyu Stadium =

Lethwei stadium in Yangon, Myanmar

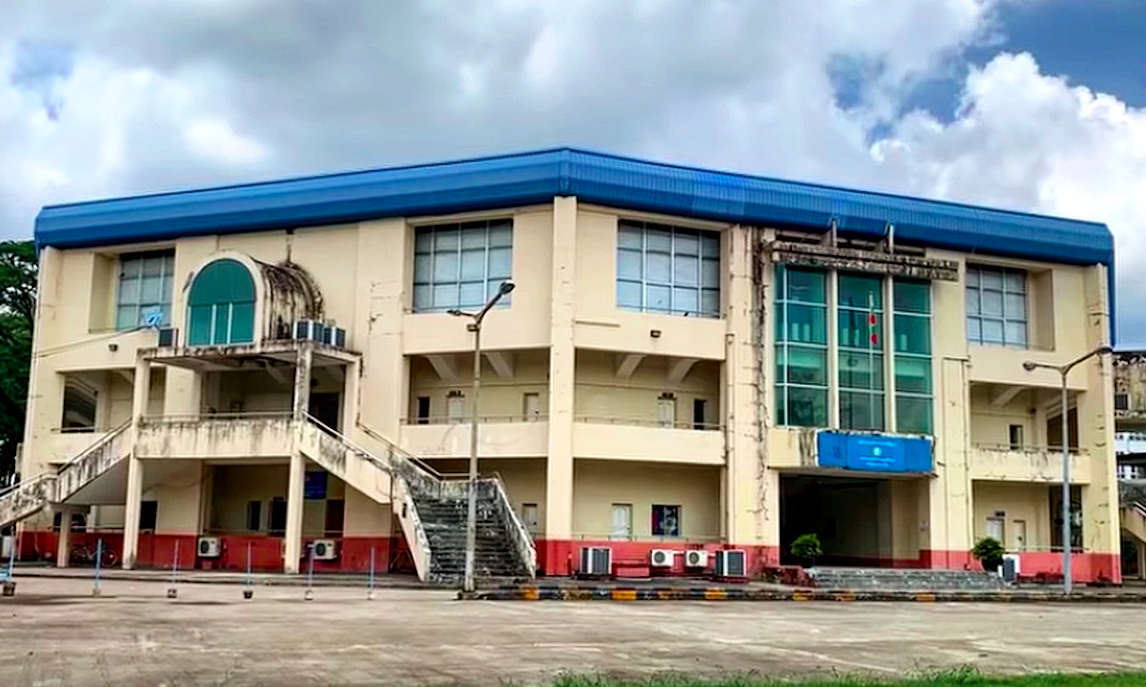
- Interactive map of Theinphyu Stadium
- Location: Theinphyu road, Yangon, Myanmar
- Coordinates: 16°49′16.73″N 96°11′12.58″E
- Owner: Ministry of Sports and Youth Affairs
- Capacity: 5,300

Tenant
- Myanmar Lethwei Federation

Theinphyu Stadium (Burmese: သိမ်ဖြူအားကစားကွင်း) is a Lethwei stadium located in Yangon, Myanmar. It is the most notorious Lethwei stadium in all of Myanmar and counts over 5,300-seats. The Stadium is operated by the Myanmar Traditional Lethwei Federation and is the venue choice for most national and international level Lethwei events. In 2018, the stadium was host of The biggest fight in Lethwei history opposing Dave Leduc vs. Tun Tun Min.

== History ==
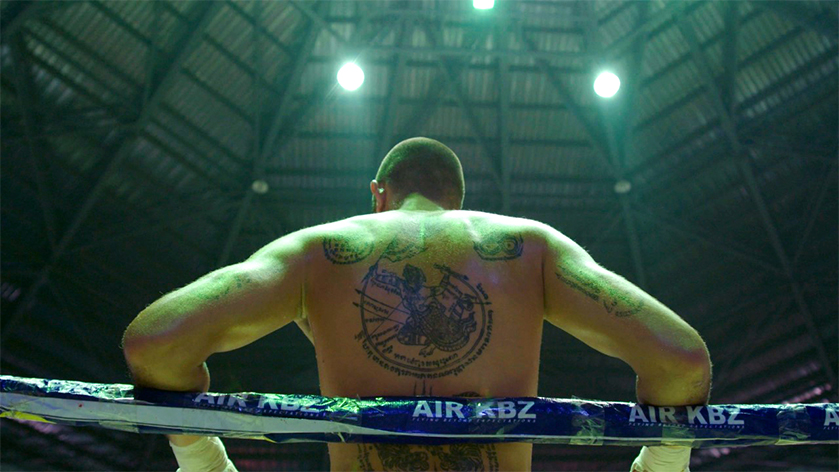
Dave Leduc in the ring at Thein Pyu Stadium, 2016

Since the 1990s, the Myanmar Traditional Lethwei Federation, has been a holding an office at the stadium under the jurisdiction of the Ministry of Health and Sports of Myanmar. The stadium complex hosts the Phoenix Letwhei Gym, a local gym also used to train and prepare fighters before they compete inside the venue.

Since 1996, the stadium has been hosting the Golden Belt Championship tournament.

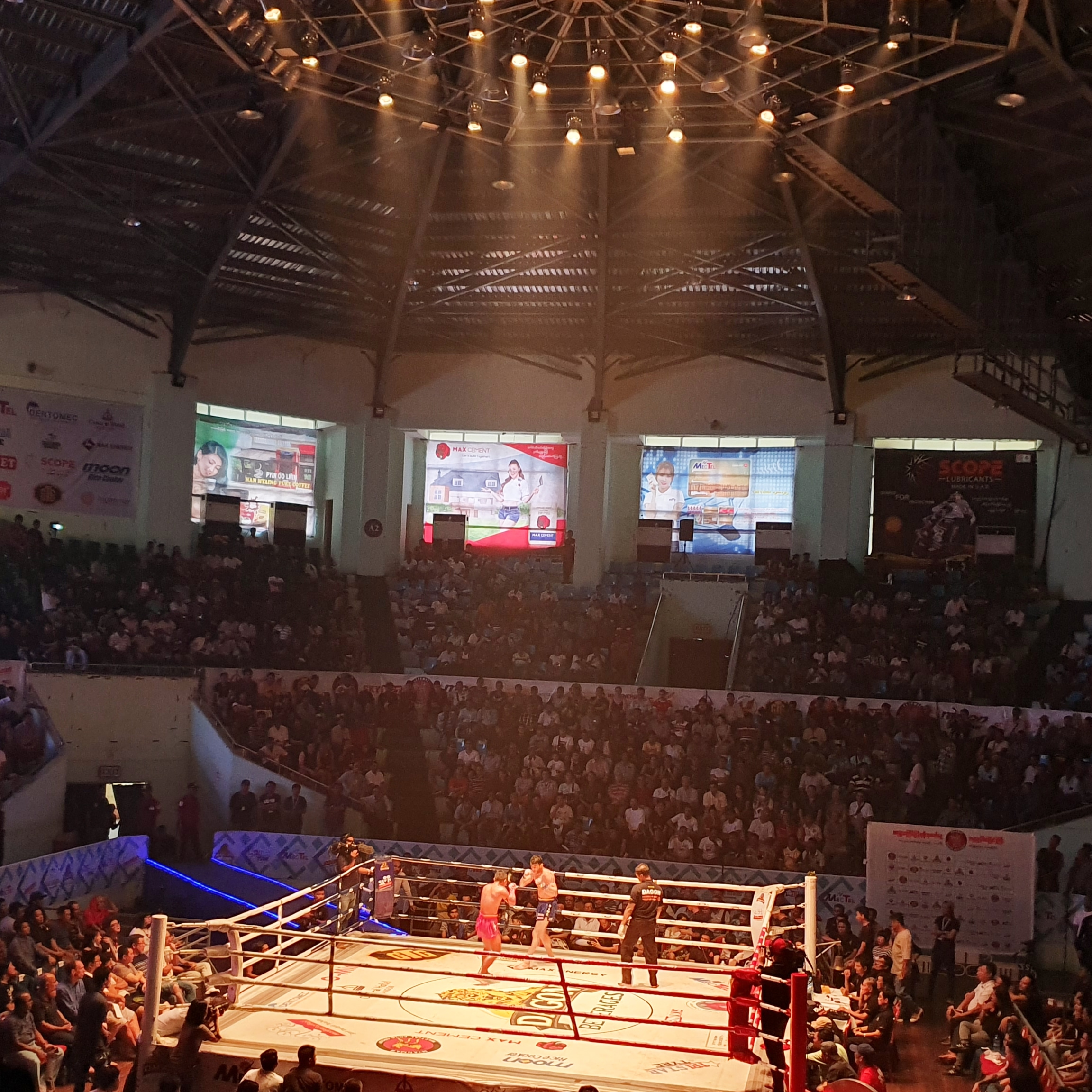
Lethwei fights at Thein Pyu stadium.

During the 2013 SEA Games held in Myanmar, the venue was used for weightlifting competitions.

On December 18, 2018, the stadium was the chosen venue for all matches of the notorious trilogy between Dave Leduc and Tun Tun Min. For the final fight, the stadium was highlighted in the feature documentary La Fosse aux Tigres.

On January 31, 2020, the World Lethwei Championship held an event for the first time at Thein Pyu at the occasion of WLC 11: Battlebones.

In March 2020, all Lethwei events were cancelled in Myanmar due to the COVID-19 pandemic. The Ministry of Health and Sports of Myanmar decided to prepare quarantine centers across the country. The Thein Pyu Stadium was transformed into a makeshift quarantine center for Myanmar nationals returning from foreign countries.

On June 1, 2019, Myanmar's first Robotics competition organized by the Myanmar RoboLeague was help inside the stadium and the Yangon team won the first place.

On February 12, 2016, a charity wrestling tournament in collaboration with MTLF and Pro Wrestling Zero1 was held at Thein Pyu to fund the restoration of flood-affected areas.

In 2020, the opening game of the Tatmadaw (Army, Navy & Air Force) Field Hockey Tournament was held at the Thein Pyu artificial grass hockey stadium in Yangon. On behalf of the Commander-in-Chief of the Tatmadaw Min Aung Hlaing, the regional commander gave an opening speech. The two opposing teams were Yangon Regional Military and the team representing the Nay Pyi Taw Regional Military.

== See also ==
- Thuwunna Stadium
- Korakuen Hall
- List of Lethwei fighters
