= Tun Tun Min =

Burmese Lethwei fighter

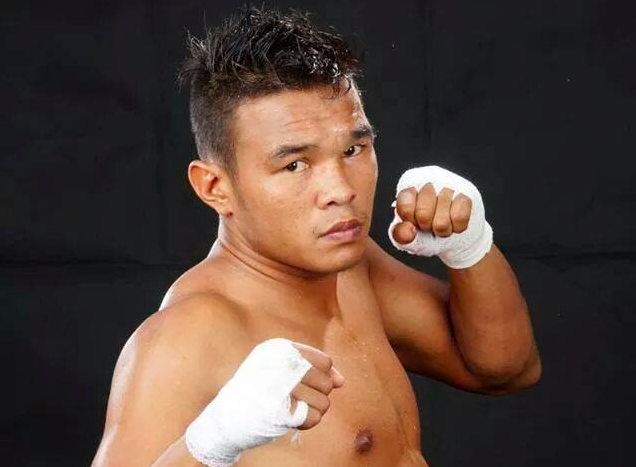
- Born: Maung Tun Tun Min; October 4, 1992 (age 33); Kyaikmaraw, Mon State, Myanmar
- Native name: ထွန်းထွန်းမင်း
- Other names: Mohammed Saet
- Height: 1.78 m (5 ft 10 in)
- Weight: 77 kg (170 lb; 12 st)
- Style: Lethwei
- Stance: Orthodox
- Team: Fight Box Lethwei and Fitness club, Fit & Fight Fitness & Lethwei, Yangon
- Years active: 2002–present

Other information
- University: Dagon University
- Spouse: Ma Thae Pwint Phyu (m. 2015)
- Notable relatives: U Tun Tun Zaw (father); Tun Min Latt (brother); Tun Min Naing (cousin); Tun Min Aung (brother)

Tun Tun Min
Medal record

Representing Myanmar

Men's Muay Thai

SEA Games
| Gold medal – first place | 2013 Naypyidaw | 71 kg |

Asian Indoor and Martial Arts Games
| Bronze medal – third place | 2013 Incheon | 71 kg |

Representing Myanmar

Men's Kun Khmer

SEA Games
| Silver medal – second place | 2023 Phnom Penh | 81 kg |

Tun Tun Min (Burmese: ထွန်းထွန်းမင်း; born 4 October 1992) is a Burmese Lethwei fighter of Mon descent and current Openweight Lethwei World Champion. In 2014, he became the youngest fighter to ever win the Lethwei Golden Belt, obtaining the title at age of 21. Tun Tun Min is considered one of Myanmar's top Lethwei fighter and is notable for fighting foreign challengers from outside Myanmar. He headlined the biggest combat sport event in Myanmar's history with the Lethwei trilogy fight vs. Dave Leduc (37 million viewers).

== Early life ==
Tun Tun Min was born in a remote village of Mon state. He is the second eldest son of Lethwei fighter U Tun Tun Zaw and his wife Daw Aye Win. Tun Tun Min was introduced to the world of traditional boxing through his grandfather and father, both well-known former Lethwei fighters in the Mon state. At the age of 6, he started training with sandbags and rudimentary equipment that his father had bought him. By 4th grade, at the age of 9, he won his first fight at the local elementary school against a rival classmate he didn't get along with. They were amateur Lethwei fights fought on the sand and not yet in a ring.

In 6th grade, Tun Tun Min decided to drop out of school to focus exclusively on his fighting career in order to support his family. For a short period of time, from 2007 until 2009, he also worked at a pineapple plantation in Thailand to earn more income. His boss at the time dared him to fight some Muay Thai boys in the village which he won. Although he did beat them, his boss unfortunately denied him to further pursue this venture. Upon his return home, Tun Tun Min joined the Mudontha Lethwei Club, founded in 2008 by Saya U Ye Thway, U Thamain Thawdar and Tun Tun Min's father.

== Career ==
=== Lethwei ===
Under the guidance of his new teachers, Tun Tun Min started his professional career fighting for prize money in Lethwei fights in pagodas and other religious festivals. He quickly became a rising star because of his aggressive style and more opportunities came around. He faced another rising star in Too Too to a draw. Three days after, Tun Tun Min was offered a fight for 6 Lakh or 600 000 Burmese kyats against Soe Lin Oo, a 2010 Golden Belt champion and already an established name at the time. Because his father insisted, the match was signed and ultimately fought to a draw. At the time, Tun Tun Min described Soe Lin Oo as the toughest opponent he had ever faced. Quickly rising through the ranks, from that moment on his career would see many more celebrated victories. Tun Tun Min faced many fighters from neighbouring Thailand and due to his larger size, he faced many foreign opponents. eventually leading up to his shot at becoming the champion.

Despite being both among the top ranked lethwei fighters in Myanmar currently, Tun Tun Min and Too Too have refused to fight each other due to their long-lasting friendship.

He took part in Muay Thai competitions at the 2012 Asian Muay Championships, 2013 Southeast Asian Games and 2013 Asian Indoor and Martial Arts Games.

Over the course of his career Tun Tun Min has been discriminated against because of his Muslim background. Fans often let their voice be heard during his matches with foreign competition, shouting racist remarks and outing their discriminating opinion in interviews. In 2017 a calendar listing current and former champions in various categories, omitted Tun Tun Min's name, title and likeness in the champions category. This prompted media to accuse the Myanmar Traditional Boxing Federation, who had commissioned the calendar, of discrimination. Tun Tun Min admitted considering leaving the sport, but the fact that he might be able to win his open-weight title back changed his mind.

On March 31, 2019, Tun Tun Min faced Muaythai Champion Thaneelek Lookkromluang form Thailand and won by KO.

=== Becoming champion ===
On September 21, 2014, Tun Tun Min became Openweight Lethwei World champion by defeating Saw Nga Man, a friend with whom he trained together for the SEA Games. When he was 21, Tun Tun Min won the Lethwei Golden belt. At that time 33 year old Saw Nga Man, nicknamed Saw Shark, had been an openweight champion for five years. Some started to question his durability while continually facing up-and-coming younger fighters. During that evening, Myanmar crowned its latest champion.

=== Cyrus Washington trilogy ===
Cyrus Washington had his introduction to Lethwei back in 2010 when he faced Saw Nga Man, who was the champion at the time. This was before Tun Tun Min's name would even start to appear in newspapers. Cyrus was an accomplished Muay Thai fighter and it took 4 years before Tun Tun Min was eligible to fight him. This happened a few months before their first fight where Tun Tun Min had beaten Saw Nga Man for the open-weight title.

Their first meeting was on December 7, 2014, at the inaugural Air KBZ sponsored Aung Lan Championship, currently an event where winners in each weight-class receive a belt and a triangular champions flag. In a stunning upset Cyrus knocked out Tun Tun Min in round three in spectacular fashion. Even after using his time-out Tun Tun Min could no longer continue. Because the bout was considered an exhibition match the open-weight title was not at stake, nor would it be during any of their fights.

The rematch took place 4 months later on April 11, 2015, at Thuwunna National Indoor Stadium in Yangon. Cyrus was once again able to knock out Tun Tun Min with a spinning technique. Unlike in their first fight Tun Tun Min was able to recover during his timeout and eventually knock Cyrus down in the 5th round prompting the corner to throw in the towel. Cyrus later explained that there was some confusion about the rules. He tried to call for a timeout, but according to the official rules you cannot use one in the last round. The confusion and miscommunication resulted in the towel being thrown.

On December 20, 2015, Tun Tun Min faced Cyrus Washington at the second Air KBZ Aung Lan Championship, for their third and final fight. The fight ended quickly and Tun Tun Min struck Cyrus on the eye socket. After taking his timeout Cyrus made clear that he did not want to continue, and the match was stopped declaring Tun Tun Min the victor after just 71 seconds. After the fight many fans were displeased with how the fight concluded and threw bottles and other items into the ring.

=== Lethwei in Japan ===
Tun Tun Min participated at the first Lethwei organized by the ILFJ. He faced Australian Adem Yilmaz at Lethwei Grand Prix Japan 2016 and knockout him out at the end of the 5th round.

=== Losing the title ===
In 2016, Tun Tun Min was challenged Canadian born fighter Dave Leduc and because of Leduc's dominant performance over Too Too, Tun Tun Min accepted the challenge. In their first match, Tun Tun Min started strong and dominated the early rounds, but Leduc came back in later rounds, resulting in the exciting match ending in a draw. After the match, Tun Tun Min was quoted saying that he had difficulties with Dave's ability to control the distance, but that he was confident and able to put on a better performance when they would rematch.

On December 11, 2016, the much anticipated rematch of Tun Tun Min and Dave Leduc took place at the 3rd Air KBZ Aung Lan Golden Belt Championship in Yangon, Myanmar. The two previously fought in October to a draw. Confident in his ability, Tun Tun Min accepted to put his openweight world title on the line. Throughout the match, Leduc targeted the leg of Tun Tun Min with push kicks and in round three, Leduc caught Tun Tun Min's left high-kick, causing him to go off-balance and twist his knee on impact. Tun Tun Min was forced to take the time-out. Continuation of round three saw Leduc execute another throw, Tun Tun Min eventually forfeited and lost for only the second time in his professional career.

=== World Lethwei Championship ===
In 2017, Tun Tun Min signed a multi-fight contract with World Lethwei Championship. For his promotional debut WLC 1: The Great Beginning, he faced British Muaythai champion Nicholas Carter. Tun Tun Min put an end to the fight in the first round by knocking down Carter with vicious headbutts and punches, reaching the maximum knockdowns.

=== Surgery ===
On December 11, 2016, Tun Tun Min sustained an injury to his knee in the fight with Dave Leduc and instead of opting for surgery right away, he fought in WLC 1. Following the fight, he took three months off to rest. In that time he felt depressed and was not sure if he would be able to fight again because of the injury. On April 7, 2017, after some encouraging words from his father he traveled to Thailand, to get surgery on his right meniscus and the ligament. He was operated at Phyathai Nawamin International Hospital in Bangkok. After successful surgery Tun Tun Min stayed for a brief recuperation until flying back home on April 18. Rehabilitation was estimated to take 8 months.

In November 2017, Tun Tun Min made a public statement that his knee was recovered and that with sufficient training he would be returning to the ring in January the same year. An announcement was made that would be fighting Thiago Goularte from Brazil on January 14, but the fight and the event was canceled since his knee was still bothering him. In the meantime, Tun Tun Min started coaching and training at Fit & Fight Fitness & Lethwei, a newly opened facility in Yangon that partly carries his name.

=== Return to the ring ===
On July 22, 2018, after 16 months of recovery and training Tun Tun Min's next opponent would be Thai Fight star Saiyok Pumpanmuang who was no stranger to glove-less combat. In 2013, Pumpanmuang was the headliner in the Thai Fight the reality television show called Thai Fight Kard Chuek and regularly fights for the promotion. Tun Tun Min and Pumpanmuang had previously met in 2013 as they both participated in the TV show.

In their fight, held in Yangon during the Golden Belt Championship, both showed immense heart. Fans they did not get to see many of Tun Tun Min's powerful trademark kicks. After the fight, Tun Tun Min mentioned that Saiyok was a more dangerous opponent than Leduc and indicated he wanted the rematch by the end of the year. Tun Tun Min has also said that this final challenge versus Leduc is what kept him going through both rehabilitation and the difficult relationship with spectators who do not support him as a Muslim. It is why in August 2018, Tun Tun Min wasted no time and issued an official challenge the reigning openweight champion Dave Leduc for a third time. However, there would be one more hurdle to overcome. In a last minute change, Daryl Lokuku who was set to face Dave Leduc initially, was instead scheduled to face Tun Tun Min on August 19 at the third Myanmar Lethwei World Championship in Yangon. Even though Tun Tun Min was able to knock down Daryl with a headbutt near the very end of an intense 5-round fight, ending in a draw. With three months of training ahead, everything would now be set for Tun Tun Min to face Dave Leduc at the Air KBZ Grand Final Myanmar Championship in Yangon.

=== Dave Leduc trilogy ===
On December 16, 2018, the trilogy fight of Dave Leduc vs. Tun Tun Min, referred as The Biggest Fight In Lethwei History, took place at the sold out Thein Pyu Stadium in Yangon, Myanmar. Fans saw Tun Tun Min fighting out of the blue corner and Dave Leduc fighting out of the red corner as the defending champion. This marked the first time a foreigner has ever been able to do so as it is customary to only have Myanmar born fighters come out of the red corner against non-Burmese. Tun Tun Min weighed in at 79.5 kg and Leduc at 79.65 kg. Both fighters represented Myanmar as their home country. A fully recovered Tun Tun Min once again had difficulty with the distance control of Leduc. Early in the first round, Leduc was able to force a count on him with a headbutt knockdown. At 1:43 Leduc landed a powerful elbow that knocked out Tun Tun Min and incapacitated him for over 40 seconds, his team called the injury time-out. The fight resumed with Tun Tun Min visibly frustrated of not being able to land on Leduc, led him to attempt a flying roundhouse kick and other acrobatic feats in an attempt to slow down his rival. The latter rounds saw both boxers vying for a finish, but ended without another knockout at the final bell and Leduc retained the Lethwei Golden Belt.

=== SEA Games ===
In 2023, Tun Tun Min was selected as the 81 kg representative for the Myanmar National team to compete in the 2023 Southeast Asian Games in Phnom Penh, Cambodia. Tun Tun Min won all his fights and made it to the final against national hero and Kun Khmer world champion Prom Samnang and lost by decision winning the silver medal for Myanmar.

=== Fight for the title ===
On January 29, 2023, Tun Tun Min faced rising star Thway Thit Win Hlaing for the Openweight Lethwei World Champion at The Great Lethwei 3' in Yangon, Myanmar. Tun Tun Min, who weighs over 80 kg and fights most of his matches in the openweight category agreed to meet his opponent at the catchweight of 77 kg. The incumbent Myanmar Lethwei Champion Dave Leduc vacated the openweight Lethwei World Championship sanctioned by the MTLF vacated the title prior to the match and Thway Thit Win Hlaing and Tun Tun Min competed for the vacant title. In the event where the champion vacates the title, the two top contenders are required to fight for the belt. In these case of the Lethwei Golden Belt, in order to have a champion, the fight cannot end in a draw, a winner must obligatory be declared even if there is no knockout. In the fourth round, Thway Thit Win Hlaing dominated and managed to knocked down Tun Tun Min to the floor twice and the referee had to count twice. Thway Thit Win Hlaing was declared the winner by decision and became Openweight Lethwei World Champion.

On August 20, 2023, Tun Tun Min rematched Thway Thit Win Hlaing at MLWC event, this time under Traditional rules with the Openweight Lethwei World Championship on the line. The match ended as a draw with Thway Thit Win Hlaing remaining champion.

== Personal life ==
Tun Tun Min is an ethnic Mon and Muslim. In his time off he enjoys Sepak takraw, volleyball and amateur football. When he was young he selected for the Kyaikmaraw Township Football Team. When he is not playing sports he likes listening to music and watching films. As of 2015, Tun Tun Min and his wife Farana reside in Yangon.

== Championships and accomplishments ==
- Lethwei World Champion
  - Openweight Lethwei Golden Belt
    - Eighteen (18) successful title defenses
- Myanmar Lethwei World Championship
  - MLWC Openweight World Championship (Three times)

Other championships

- (gold) 2015 Thingyan Fight Champion
- (gold) 2013 Dagon Shwe Aung Lan Special Award
- (gold) 2010 Regions and States Lethwei Competition
- (gold) 2013 Southeast Asian Games - Naypyidaw, Myanmar
- (silver) 2012 Asian Muay Championships - Ho Chi Minh City, Vietnam
- (silver) 2023 Southeast Asian Games - Phnom Penh, Cambodia
- (bronze) 2013 Asian Indoor Martial Arts Games - Incheon, South Korea

Awards, records, and honours

- Youngest Golden Belt champion
- 2015 Best fighter award

== Lethwei record ==
Professional Lethwei record
86 fights, 59 wins (59 KOs), 4 losses, 23 draws
| Date | Result | Opponent | Event | Location | Method | Round | Time |
| 2025-08-17 | Win | (Iran) Keivan Soleimani | Myanmar Lethwei World Championship 2025 | Yangon, Myanmar | KO (Headbutt) | 1 | |
For vacant Openweight Lethwei Golden Belt
| 2024-22-09 | Win | (Myanmar) Kyaw Swar Win | Myanmar Lethwei World Championship 2024 | Yangon, Myanmar | KO (Head Kick) | 1 | 3:00 |
| 2024-11-09 | Draw | (Myanmar) Thway Thit Win Hlaing | (69th) Karen State Day | Hpa-an, Myanmar | Draw | 5 | 3:00 |
| 2023-08-20 | Draw | (Myanmar) Thway Thit Win Hlaing | Myanmar Lethwei World Championship 2023 | Yangon, Myanmar | Draw | 5 | 3:00 |
| 2023-01-29 | Loss | (Myanmar) Thway Thit Win Hlaing | The Great Lethwei 3 | Yangon, Myanmar | Decision | 5 | 3:00 |
For vacant Openweight Lethwei Golden Belt
| 2022-08-14 | Win | (Iran) Hamed Soleimani | Myanmar Lethwei World Championship 2022 | Yangon, Myanmar | KO | 1 | |
Defends Openweight Myanmar Lethwei World Championship - MLWC
| 2020-12-06 | Draw | (Myanmar) Shwe Yar Man | Myanmar Lethwei World Championship 2020 | Yangon, Myanmar | Draw | 5 | |
| 2020-01-20 | Draw | (Iran) Keivan Soleimani | Win Sein Taw Ya 2020 | Mudon Township, Myanmar | Draw | 5 | |
| 2019-08-18 | Win | (Russia) Mikhail Vetrila | 2019 Myanmar Lethwei World Championship | Yangon, Myanmar | KO | 5 | 1:51 |
Wins Openweight Myanmar Lethwei World Championship - MLWC
| 2019-03-31 | Win | (Thailand) Thaneelek Lookkromluang | Lethwei Nation Fight | Yangon, Myanmar | KO | 4 | |
| 2018-12-16 | Draw | (Myanmar) Dave Leduc | Dave Leduc vs. Tun Tun Min III | Yangon, Myanmar | Draw | 5 | |
For Openweight Lethwei Golden Belt
| 2018-08-19 | Draw | (Democratic Republic of the Congo) Daryl Lokuku | Myanmar Lethwei World Championship 2018 | Yangon, Myanmar | Draw | 5 | |
| 2018-07-22 | Draw | (Thailand) Saiyok Pumpanmuang | Golden Belt Championship | Yangon, Myanmar | Draw | 5 | |
| 2017-03-03 | Win | (United Kingdom) Nicholas Carter | WLC 1: The Great Beginning | Yangon, Myanmar | TKO | 1 | 2:59 |
| 2016-12-11 | Loss | (Canada) Dave Leduc | 2016 Air KBZ Aung Lan Championship | Yangon, Myanmar | TKO (Forfeit) | 3 | 2:34 |
Lost Openweight Lethwei Golden Belt
| 2016-10-27 | Win | (Australia) Adem Yilmaz | Lethwei Grand Prix Japan 2016 | Tokyo, Japan | KO | 5 | |
| 2016-10-09 | Draw | (Canada) Dave Leduc | GTG International Challenge Fights 2016 | Yangon, Myanmar | Draw | 5 | |
| 2016-08-21 | Win | (Thailand) Petchchuechip (Tanee Khomgrich) | Myanmar Lethwei World Championship 2016 | Yangon, Myanmar | KO | 1 | |
Wins Openweight Myanmar Lethwei World Championship - MLWC
| 2016-04-02 | Win | (Russia) Ludwik Dokhoyan | Max Thingyan Fight | Yangon, Myanmar | KO | 1 | |
| 2016-02-23 | Win | (Russia) Evgeni Klimin | Thaung Pyin Challenge Fights | Ye Township, Myanmar | KO | 2 | |
| 2016-02-04 | Win | (Uzbekistan) Tolipov Mansurbek | Win Sein Taw Ya 2016 | Mudon Township, Myanmar | KO | 2 | |
| 2016-01-17 | Win | (Myanmar) Saw Gaw Mu Do | Challenge to Myanmar Champion! | Yangon, Myanmar | KO | 2 | |
| 2015-12-20 | Win | (United States) Cyrus Washington | Air KBZ Aung Lan Championship 2015 | Yangon, Myanmar | KO | 1 | |
| 2015-10-11 | Win | (New Zealand) Daniel Kerr | Who is the BEST? | Yangon, Myanmar | KO | 2 | |
| 2015-08-30 | Win | (Brazil) Jackson Alves de Souza | All Star Big Fight | Yangon, Myanmar | KO | 1 | |
| 2015-04-11 | Win | (United States) Cyrus Washington | Thingyan Fight 2015 | Yangon, Myanmar | KO | 5 | |
| 2015-03-29 | Win | (Thailand) Petchmankong Gaiyanghadaow | One On One Myanmar-Thai Challenge Fights | Yangon, Myanmar | KO | 3 | |
| 2015-03-04 | Win | (Thailand) Dernchonlek Sor.Sor.Niyom | Kyaik Kay Lar Tha Challenge Fights | Lamaing Township, Myanmar | KO | 4 | |
| 2015-02-04 | Draw | (Thailand) Berneung Topkingboxing | 68th Mon National Day | Ye Township, Myanmar | Draw | 5 | |
| 2015-01-15 | Win | (France) Dimitri Masson | Win Sein Taw Ya 2015 | Mudon Township, Myanmar | KO | 2 | |
| 2015-01-05 | Win | (Thailand) Trakoonsing Tor.Jatuten | Hnit Kayin Challenge Fights | Ye Township, Myanmar | KO | 4 | |
| 2014-12-07 | Loss | (United States) Cyrus Washington | Air KBZ Aung Lan Championship 2014 | Yangon, Myanmar | KO | 3 | |
For Air KBZ Aung Lan Championship
| 2014-11-02 | Win | (Canada) Matthew Richardson | One on One International Challenge Fight | Yangon, Myanmar | KO | 3 | |
| 2014-09-21 | Win | (Myanmar) Saw Nga Man | Who is Number One? | Yangon, Myanmar | TKO | 4 | |
Wins Openweight Lethwei Golden Belt
| 2014-08-31 | Win | (Thailand) Petchtae Tor.Maxmuaythai | Ultimate International Letwhay Challenge Fight 2014 | Singapore | KO | 2 | |
| 2014-07-06 | Win | (Thailand) Weerapol | One on One Big Fight | Yangon, Myanmar | KO | 3 | |
| 2014-05-18 | Win | (Thailand) Petchtae Tor.Maxmuaythai | International Lethwei Challenge Fights | Yangon, Myanmar | KO | 5 | |
| 2014-04-06 | Draw | (Myanmar) Saw Yan Paing | Myaw Sin Island Challenge Fights | Yangon, Myanmar | Draw | 5 | |
| 2014-03-26 | Win | (Thailand) Pravit Aor.Piriyapinyo | Taung Pa Village Challenge Fights | Mudon Township, Myanmar | KO | 2 | |
| 2014-03-15 | Draw | (Thailand) Pravit Aor.Piriyapinyo | International Challenge Fights | Lamaing, Ye, Myanmar | Draw | 5 | |
| 2014-03-09 | Win | (Thailand) Rajchasie Pumphanmuang | Hla Ka Zaing Village International Challenge Fights | Kyaikmaraw Township, Myanmar | KO | 3 | |
| 2014-01-26 | Win | (Thailand) Yodkunkrai Por.Wiriya | International Lethwei Challenge Fights | Thaung Pyin, Myanmar | KO | 1 | |
| 2013-09-21 | Draw | (Japan) Naoki Samukawa | Myanmar vs. Japan Challenge Fight | Yangon, Myanmar | Draw | 5 | |
| 2013-05-12 | Draw | (Myanmar) Soe Lin Oo | Lethwei Challenge Fights | Yangon, Myanmar | Draw | 5 | |
| 2013-04-25 | Draw | (Myanmar) Soe Lin Oo | Lethwei Challenge Fights | Myanmar | Draw | 5 | |
| 2013 | Win | (Thailand) Yodkunkrai Por.Wiriya | International Lethwei Challenge Fights | Myanmar | KO | 1 | |
| 2013-05 | Win | (Myanmar) Saw Yan Paing | Lethwei Challenge Fights | Lamaing, Ye, Myanmar | KO | 2 | |
| 2013-03-25 | Win | (Myanmar) Tun Tun | Lethwei Challenge Fights | Ye Township, Myanmar | KO | 3 | |
| 2013-02-12 | Draw | (Myanmar) Dawna Aung | Taungoo City Challenge Fights | Taungoo, Myanmar | Draw | 5 | |
| 2013-02-05 | Win | (Thailand) Yodtang | Win Sein Taw Ya 2013 | Mudon Township, Myanmar | KO | 1 | |
| 2013-01-20 | Win | (Thailand) Poonpetch | Myanmar vs. Thailand Letwhay Competition | Yangon, Myanmar | KO | 1 | |
| 2013-01-06 | Win | (Germany) Felix | Dagon Shwe Aung Lan 2013 | Yangon, Myanmar | KO | 2 | |
| 2012-12-14 | Win | (Myanmar) Saw Ga Pa Rae Hmu | Lethwei Challenge Fights | Mandalay, Myanmar | KO | 3 | |
| 2012-11-25 | Draw | (Myanmar) Tha Pyay Nyo | Lethwei Challenge Fights | Yangon, Myanmar | Draw | 5 | |
| 2012 | Draw | (Myanmar) Tha Pyay Nyo | Lethwei Challenge Fights | Lamaing, Ye, Myanmar | Draw | 5 | |
| 2012-02 | Draw | (Myanmar) Win Tin | Thaung Pyin Challenge Fights | Ye Township, Myanmar | Draw | 5 | |
| 2012 | Draw | (Myanmar) Daung Thi Chay | Win Sein Taw Ya 2012 | Mudon Township, Myanmar | Draw | 5 | |
| 2011-11 | Win | (Thailand) Sankom Muang Ya-mo (Pettaporn) | Pa Nga International Lethwei Challenge Fights | Thanbyuzayat Township, Myanmar | KO | 3 | |
| 2011-11-07 | Loss | (Myanmar) Nay Salai (Maw She) | 56th Kayin State Day Aung Lan Semi final | Kayin State, Myanmar | TKO (cut) | 3 | |
| 2011-07-03 | Win | (Myanmar) Shwe Thein Aung | Myanmar vs. Thailand Challenge Fights (Day 2) | Mandalay, Myanmar | KO | 1 | |
| 2011-05-16 | Draw | (Myanmar) Soe Htet Oo | Commemoration of Nyaung Water Festival | Mudon Township, Myanmar | Draw | 5 | |
| 2011-03-15 | Win | (Myanmar) Saw Gaw Mu Do | Thanbyuzayat Challenge Fights | Thanbyuzayat Township, Myanmar | KO | 2 | |
| 2011 | Draw | (Myanmar) Soe Lin Oo | Lethwei Challenge Fights | Myanmar | Draw | 5 | |
| 2011 | Draw | (Myanmar) Too Too | Lethwei Challenge Fights | Myanmar | Draw | 5 | |
| 2011 | Draw | (Myanmar) Kyaw Ye Khaung | Royal Club Challenge Fights | Mawlamyine, Myanmar | Draw | 4 | |
| 2010-10-26 | Draw | (Myanmar) Kyar Pauk | Yele Pagoda Lethwei Challenge Fights | Kyaikkhami, Myanmar | Draw | 4 | |
Legend: Win Loss Draw/No contest Notes

== Muay Thai record ==
Professional Muay Thai record
2 wins, 1 loss, 0 draws
| Date | Result | Opponent | Event | Location | Method | Round | Time |
| 2013-07-14 | Loss | (Belgium) Youssef Boughanem | Thai Fight Kard Chuek | Bangkok, Thailand | Decision | 3 | 3:00 |
| 2013-06-15 | Win | (France) Dimitri Masson | Thai Fight Kard Chuek | Bangkok, Thailand | Decision | 3 | 3:00 |
| 2013-06-01 | Win | (Senegal) Amadou Ba | Thai Fight Kard Chuek | Bangkok, Thailand | TKO | 1 | 1:25 |
Legend: Win Loss Draw/No contest Notes

== See also ==
- List of Lethwei fighters

Awards and achievements
| Preceded by Saw Nga Man | Openweight Lethwei World Champion; September 21, 2014 – December 11, 2016 | Succeeded by Dave Leduc |
