= World Muaythai Federation =

The World Muaythai Federation also known as World Muaythai Professional Federation (WPMF) was formed in 1995 by the Professional Boxing Association of Thailand (PAT) and sanctioned by The Sports Authority of Thailand (S.A.T.). The federation is a governing body for professional Muaythai. World Muaythai Professional Federation (WPMF) was newly founded by the Professional Boxing Association of Thailand (PAT) in World Professional Muaythai Association (WPMTA)

Male world champions

Weight Class	Champion	Date Won
Super Heavyweight		
Heavyweight		
Cruiserweight		
Light Heavyweight		
Super Middleweight		
Middleweight		
Super Welterweight		
Welterweight		
Super Lightweight		
Lightweight		
Super Featherweight		
Featherweight		
Super Bantamweight		
Bantamweight		
Super Flyweight		
Flyweight		

== See also ==
- List of international sports federations
- World Muaythai Council
- International Federation of Muaythai Amateur
- World Association of Kickboxing Organizations
