= Thanbyuzayat =

Thanbyuzayat သံဖြူဇရပ် ဍုၚ်ဇြပ်ဗု Thanbyuxayat, Thanbyuzat
- Town
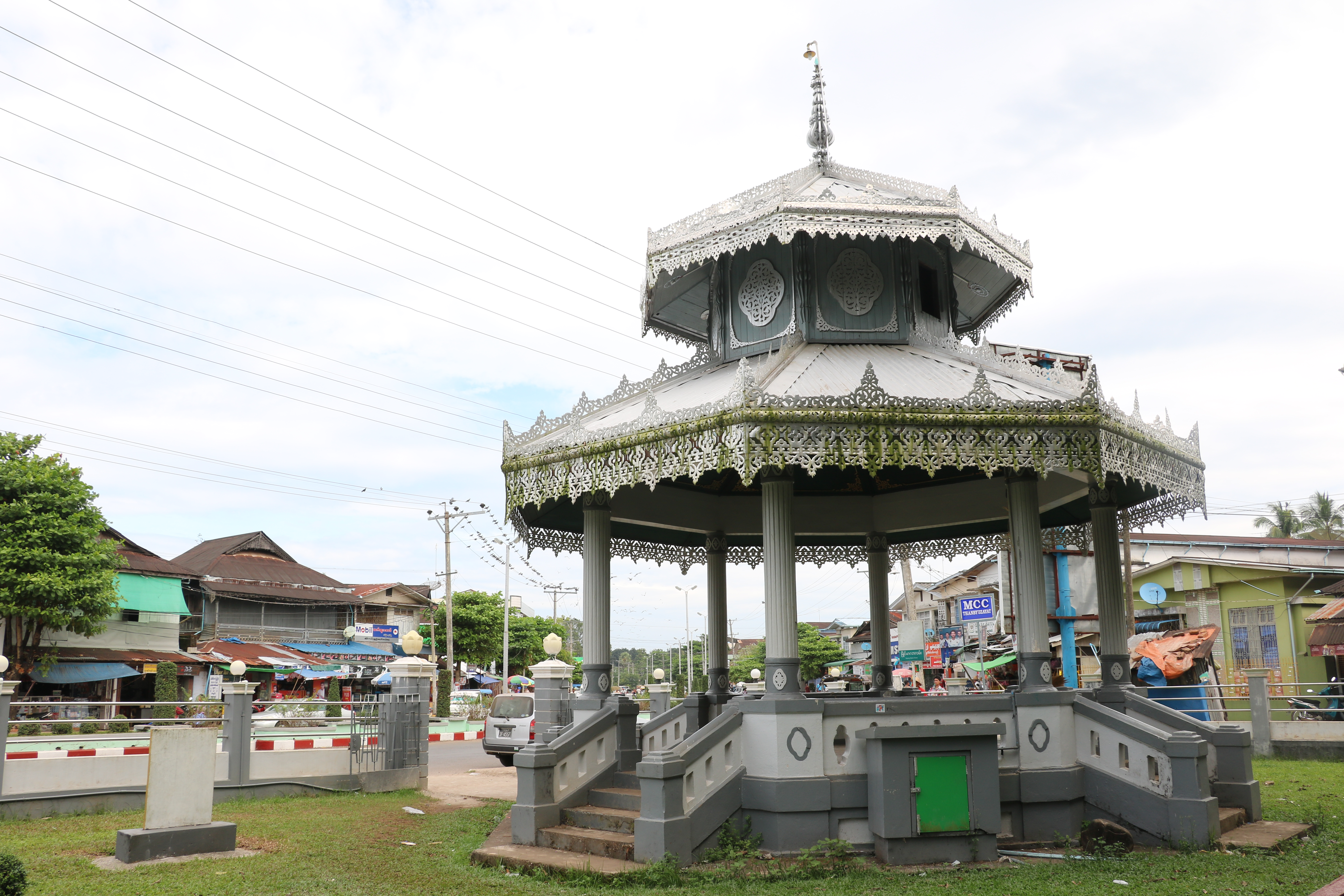

- Location in Burma
- Coordinates: 15°58′N 97°44′E
- Country: Myanmar
- Division: Mon State
- District: Mawlamyine District
- Township: Thanbyuzayat Township

Population (2005)
  - Religions: Buddhism
- Time zone: UTC+6.30 (MST)

Thanbyuzayat (Burmese: သံဖြူဇရပ်မြို့; Mon: ဍုၚ်ဇြပ်ဗု, lit. 'Tin Shelter'") is a town in the Mon State of south-eastern Myanmar. It is the administrative center for Thanbyuzayat Township. Thanbyuzayat is about 64 kilometres (40 mi) south of Mawlamyine (Moulmein) and 24 kilometres (15 mi) south-east of Kyaikkami (Amherst) and Setse beach.

== History ==
The name of the town gets its name from a white tin zayat located in the town centre. The interjunction that tin zayat located was once a rest place for travellers, and the tin zayat was constructed in 1874 by a Mon lady called Mi Gee Yut. During WWII, Thanbyuzayat was just a large village within Kyaikkami township, and later gained town status.

=== Camp Thanbyuzayat ===
During World War II, Thanbyuzayat was the western terminus of the notorious Death Railway (Siam–Burma Railway) linking up with the pre-war coastal railway between Ye and Rangoon. Thanbyuzayat was also the site of a Japanese prisoner of war camp for the prisoners who worked on building the railway, The first prisoners arrived in June 1942. 13,000 prisoners passed through the camp of which at least 6,000 were Australian and 4,300 Dutch prisoners of war. From Thanbyuzayat, the prisoners were moved to work camps on the railway line. The camp was abandoned on 22 June 1943 due to continuous allied bombardment which killed 12 prisoners.

The Death Railway Museum has been established at the western terminus of the railway. In the Thanbyuzayat War Cemetery, 3,626 Allied servicemen (mostly Australian, British and Dutch) are buried. All prisoners who died on the Burma side have been re-buried at Thanbyuzayat except for the Americans who have been repatriated.

== Places of interest ==
- Thanbyuzayat War Cemetery
- Death Railway Museum
- Setse beach
- Setse Agar jelly production farms
- Pa-nga salt farms
- Pa-nga Ngapi production village
- Kyaik Kohgrain Pagoda
- Hot springs (originally built for WWII Japanese officers)
- Kyaikkhami resort town
- Kyeik Ne' Pagoda Welgalaung Village

== Gallery ==
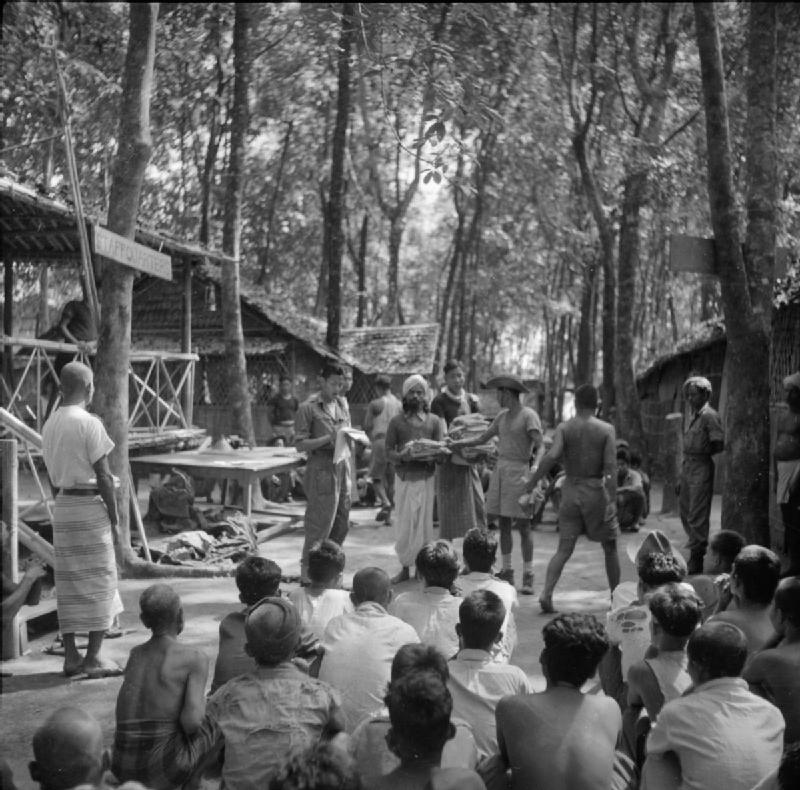
A Japanese labour camp at Thanbyuzayat in WWII

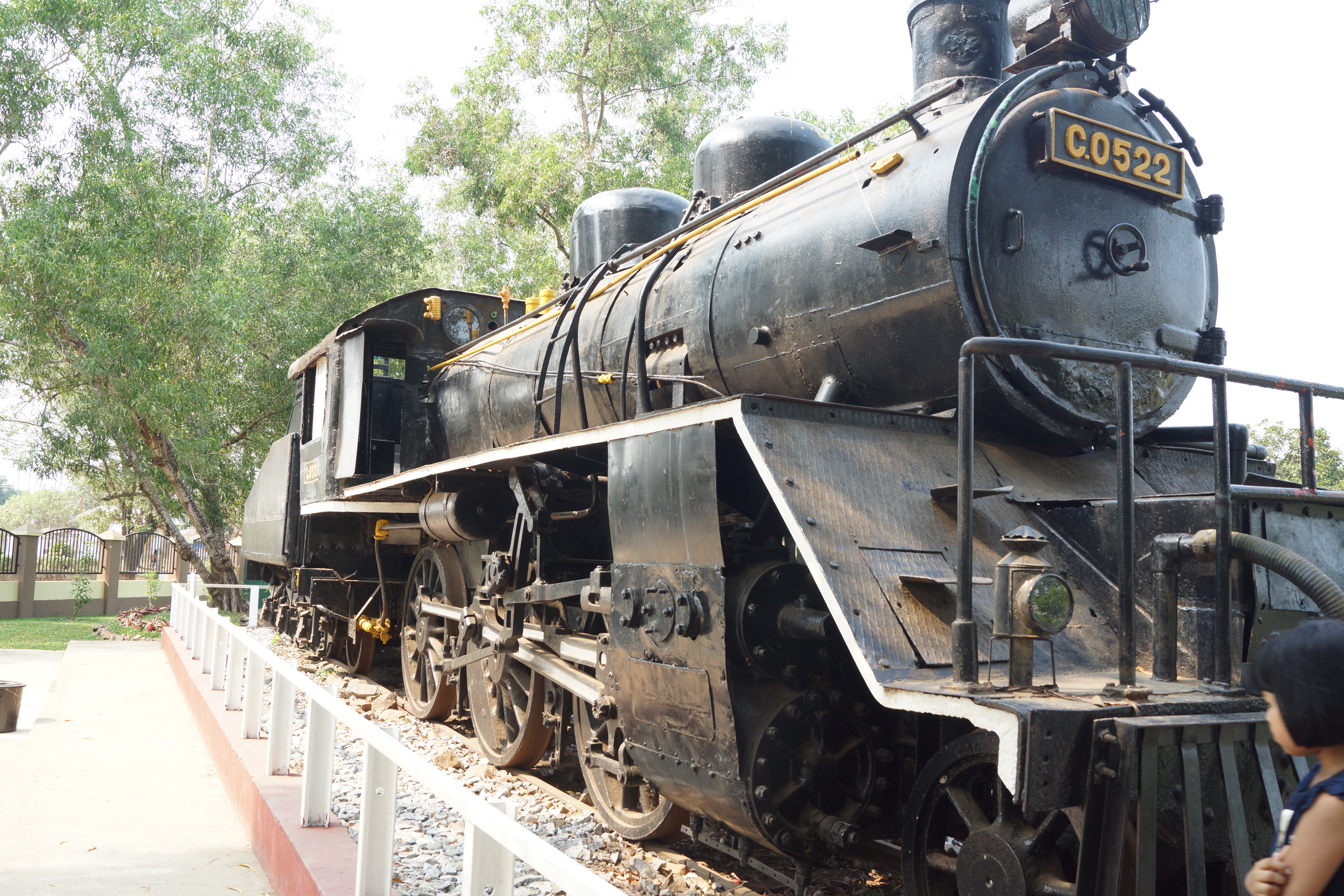
The very first locomotive used on the Death Railway

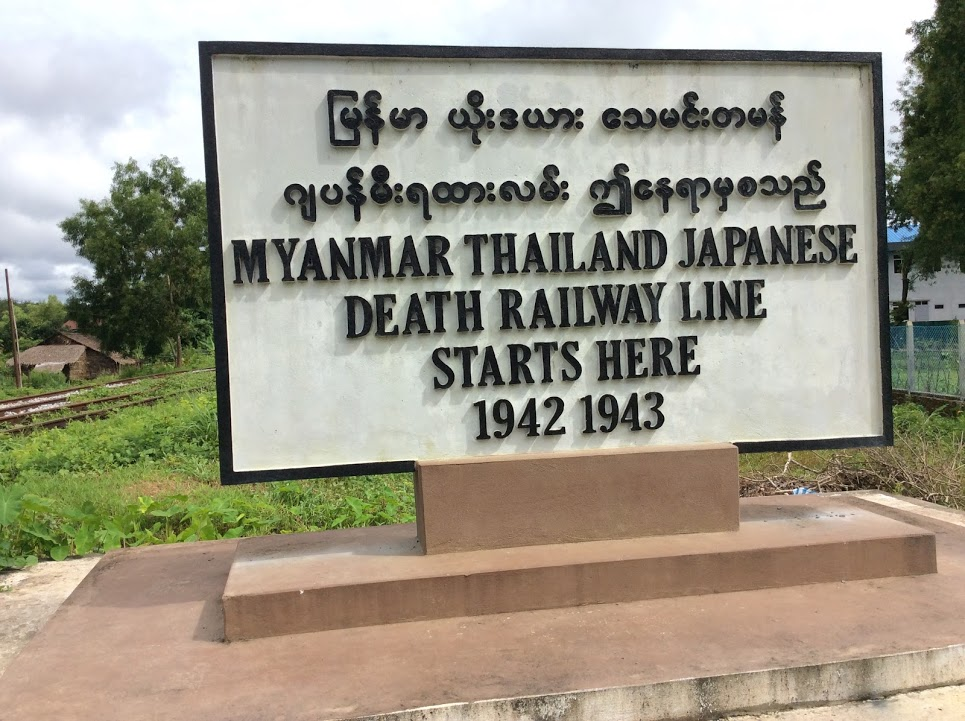
The start point of Death Railway Line

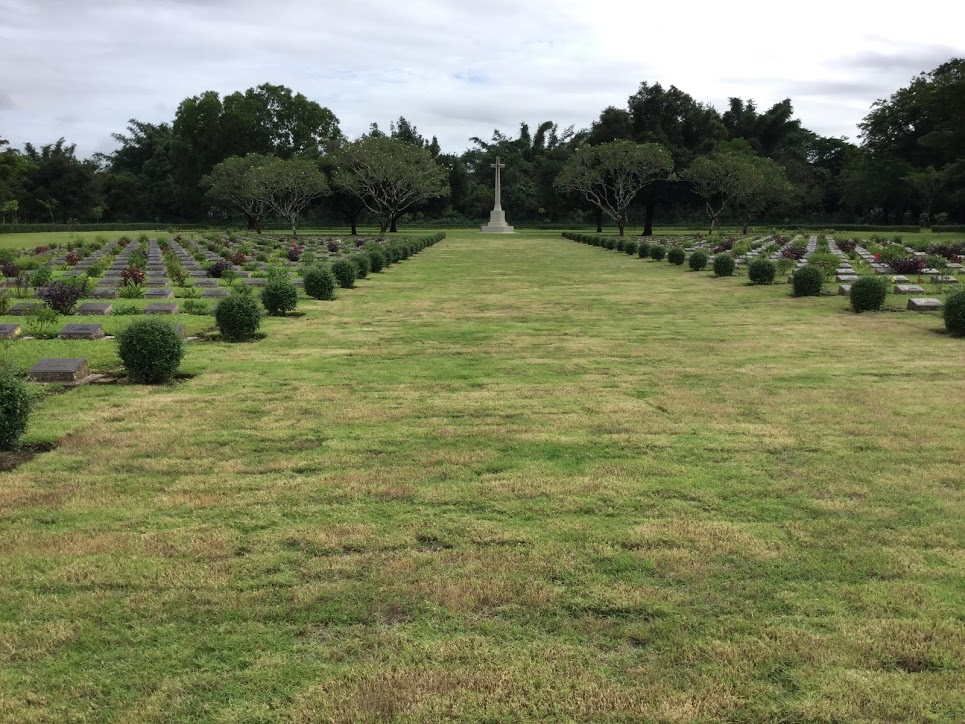
Thanbyuzayat Prisoners-of-war Cemetery

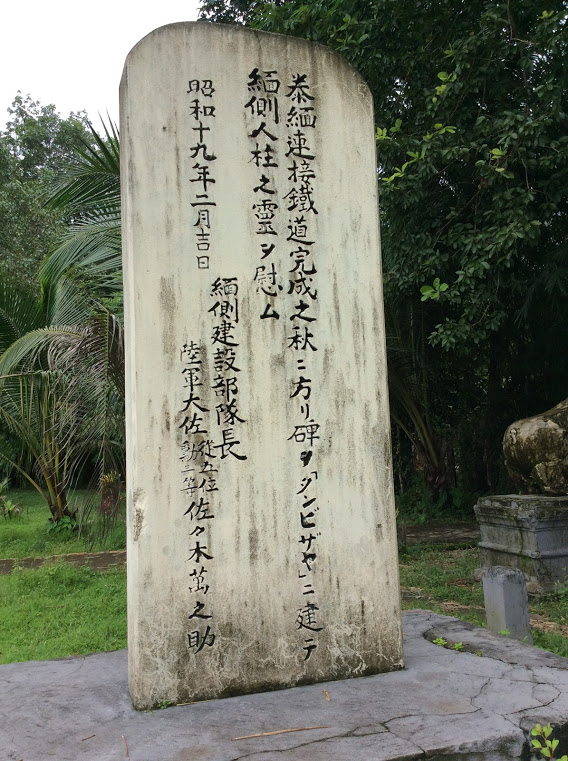
Cenotaph for Asian workers and Allied POWs, built by Japanese

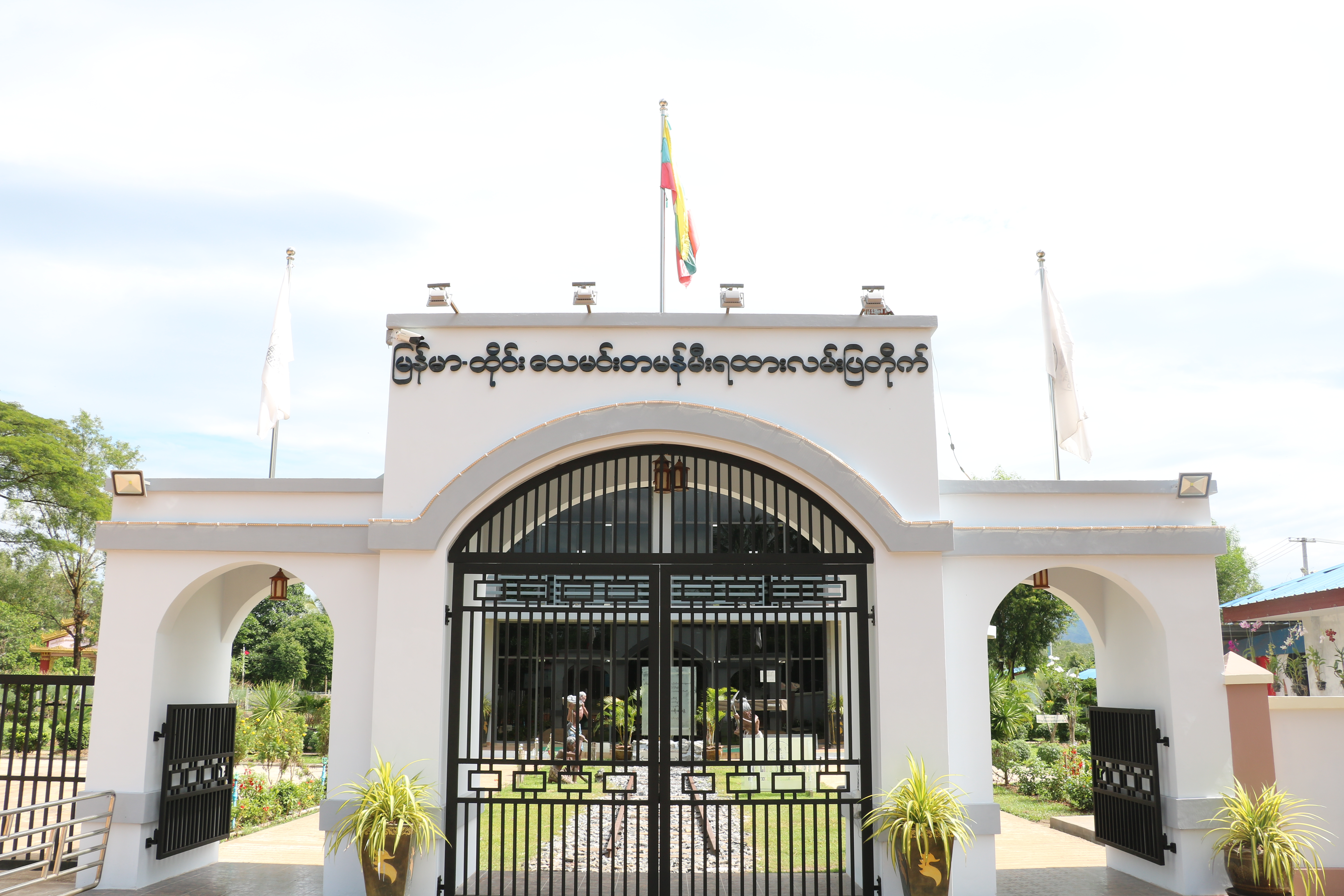
Death Railway Museum

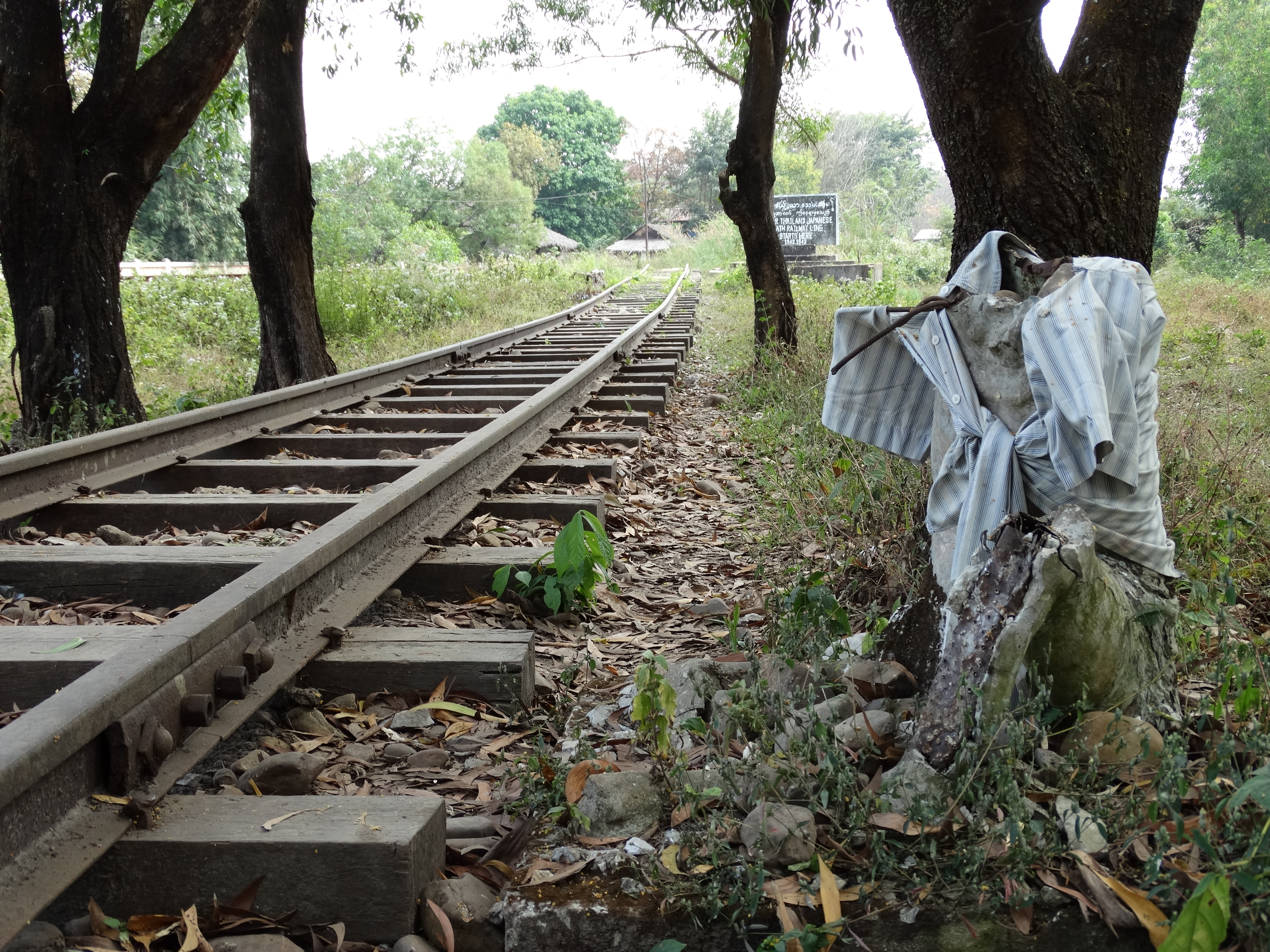
Abandoned section of Death Railway in Thanbyuzayat

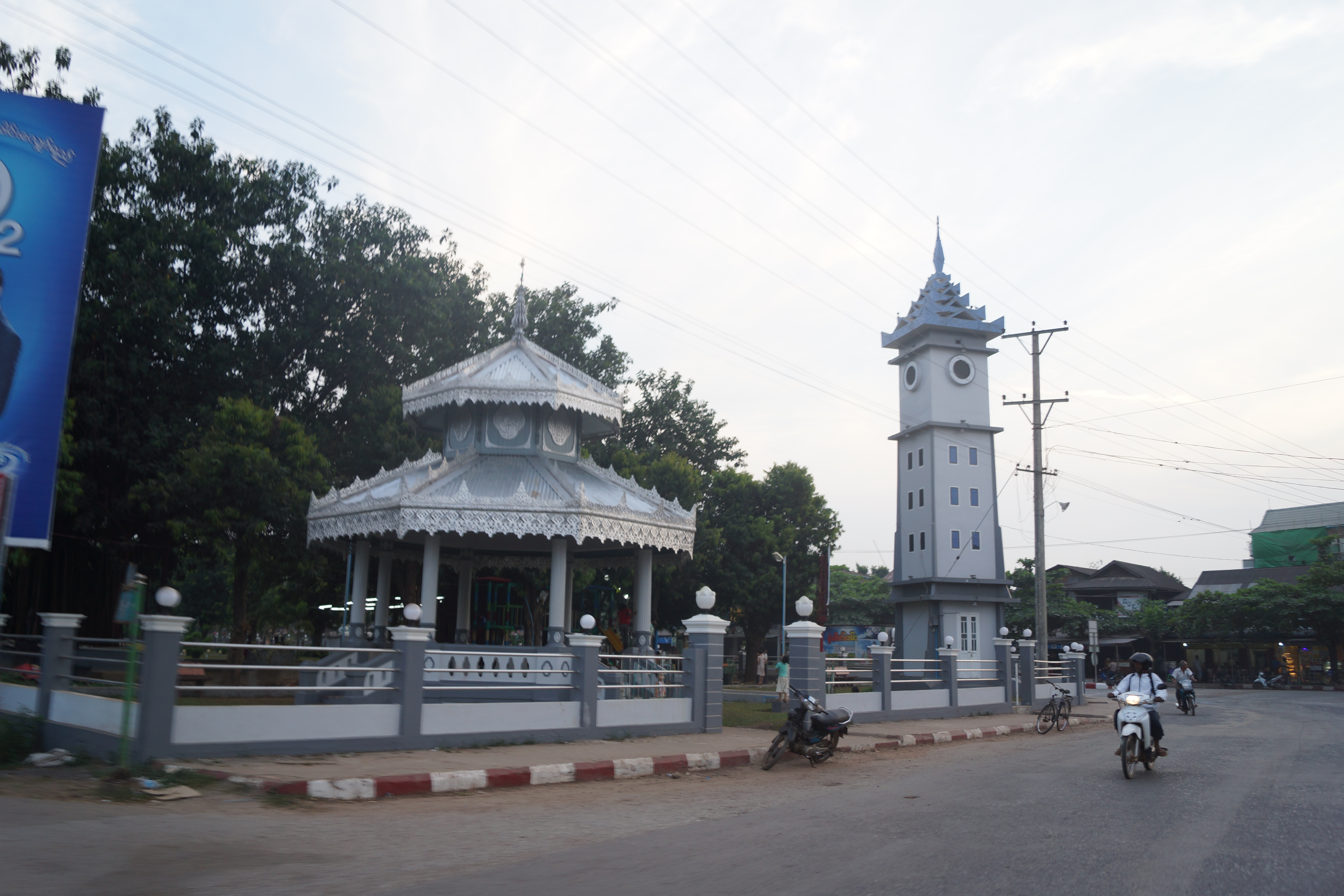
Town centre

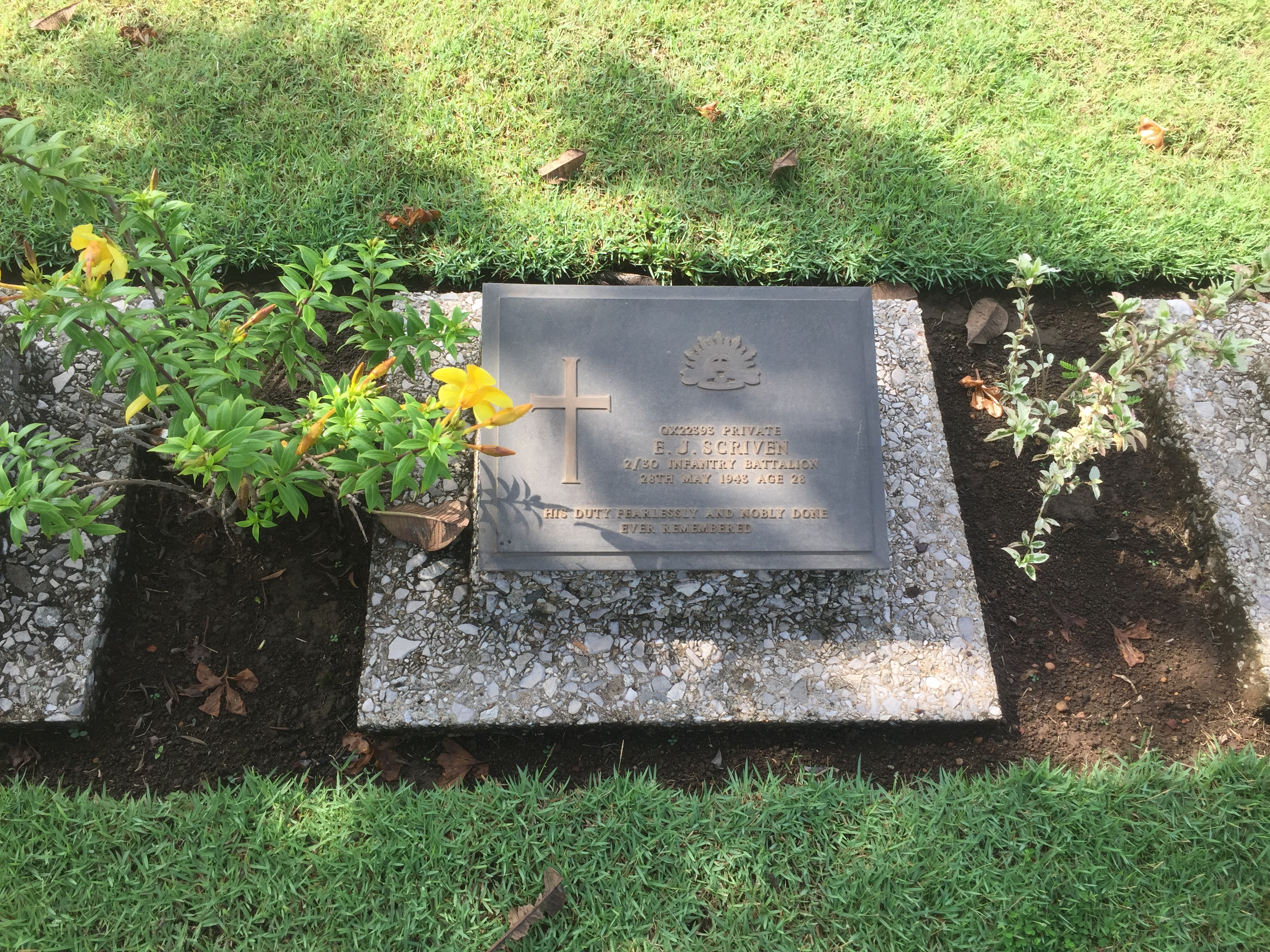
A tombstone of Allied soldier

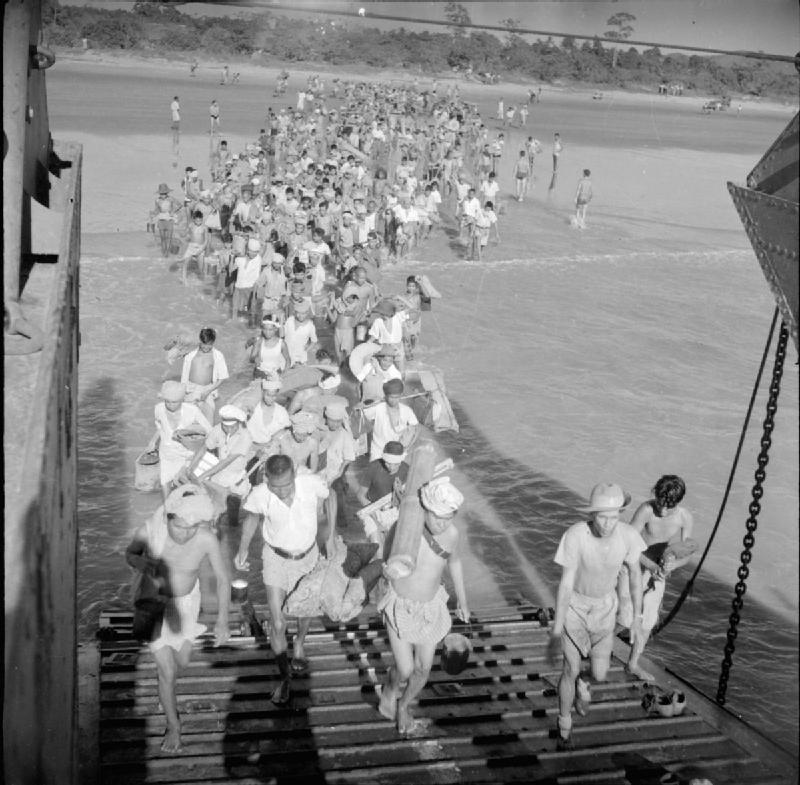
Repatriation of the prisoners at Setse beach after WWII

== See also ==
- Death Railway
- To End All Wars (film)
- The Bridge over the River Kwai
