= Abaw =

- Location in Burma
- Coordinates: 15°15′N 97°49′E
- Country: Myanmar
- State: Mon State
- District: Mawlamyine District
- Township: Ye Township

Population (2005)
  - Religions: Buddhism
- Time zone: UTC+6.30 (MST)

Abaw (Mon: အၜဝ်,[ʔɑ.ˈɓou]; Burmese: အဘော) is a village in Ye Township in Mawlamyine District in the Mon State of south-east Burma. It is located between the town of Ye to the east and Duya to the northwest and Asin to the southwest.

Nearby towns and villages include Kin (2.6 km), Duya (4.0 km), Ye (3.5 km), Asin (5.2 km), and Kyonpaw (6.7 km).

The centre of the village lies about a kilometre north of the Ye River, on the edge of the Yegyaw Marsh (Yegyaw Chaung) which provides water for local agriculture.
