= Tayoktauk =

- Location in Burma
- Coordinates: 15°13′N 97°46′E
- Country: Burma
- State: Mon State
- Township: Ye Township

Population (2005)
  - Religions: Buddhism
- Time zone: UTC+6.30 (UTC + 6:30)

Tayoktauk is a coastal village in Ye Township in the Mon State of south-east Burma. It is located south-west of Ye city.

Nearby towns and villages include Daminzeikkyi (11.0 nm), Thabya (2.2 nm), Khawsa (3.1 nm), Kyaukayan (10.0 nm), Magyi (6.3 nm), Meiktulagale (4.9 nm), and Kyon-ye (4.2 nm).
