= Taungbon =

Taungbon may refer to four towns and villages in Burma:

- Taungbon, Sagaing in Kawlin Township
- Taungbon, Mandalay in Myingyan Township
- Taungbon, Shan in Ye-Ngan Township
- Taungbon, Mon in Ye Township
