= Hnyigarok =

- Location in Burma
- Coordinates: 15°22′N 97°46′E
- Country: Burma
- State: Mon State
- Township: Ye Township
- Elevation: 69 ft (21 m)

Population (2005)
  - Religions: Buddhism
- Time zone: UTC+6.30 (UTC + 6:30)

Hnyigarok is a coastal village in Ye Township in the Mon State of south-east Burma. It is approximately 17 kilometres (11 mi) north-west of Ye city in a channel off the Andaman Sea.

Nearby towns and villages include Daminzeik Auk (11.2 nm), Zayat (7.1 nm), Thingangyun (1.4 nm), Andin (1.0 nm) and Saiye (1.0 nm).
