= Thinbawzeik =

- Location in Burma
- Coordinates: 15°26′N 97°48′E
- Country: Burma
- State: Mon State
- Township: Ye Township
- Elevation: 39 ft (12 m)

Population (2005)
  - Religions: Buddhism
- Time zone: UTC+6.30 (UTC + 6:30)

Thinbawzeik is a village in Ye Township in the Mon State of south-east Burma. It is located north-west of Ye city.

Nearby towns and villages include Zayat (4.2 nm), Thaungbyin (1.0 nm), Taungbon (2.2 nm), Thingangyun (3.1 nm) and Awainggale (3.1 nm).
