= Kawdut =

Koh Doot
- ကအ်ဍောတ်
- Location in Burma
- Coordinates: 15°30′58″N 97°46′57″E
- Country: Burma (Myanmar)
- State: Mon State
- District: Mawlamyine District
- Township: Ye Township
- Elevation: 9 m (30 ft)

Population (2014)
  - Total: 8,480
  - Religions: Buddhism
- Time zone: UTC+6.30 (MST)

Koh Doot (Mon: ကအ်ဍောတ်; Burmese: ကော့ဒွတ်) is a large village in Ye Township in Mawlamyine District in the Mon State of south-east Myanmar. Koh Doot is on the coastal plain about 6 kilometres (3.7 mi) west of Lamaing. The Koh Doot Ferry is about 1.7 km north-west of the village on the Koh Doot Chaung.
