= Saiye =

Saiye may refer to:

- Saiye, Burma, a village in Ye Township, Mon State, Burma
- Saiye, Ghana or Saive, a settlement in Ghana

== See also ==
- Saiyed, an honorific title
