= Hangan =

Hangan ဟံၚ်ဂါမ်
- Village
- Hangan Location
- Coordinates: 15.1729°N 97.8638°E
- Country: Burma (Myanmar)
- State: Mon State
- District: Mawlamyine District
- Township: Ye Township
- Elevation: 13 m (43 ft)

Population
  - Religions: Buddhism
- Time zone: UTC+6.30 (MST)
- Website: www.facebook.com/hanganvillagemonstateburme

Hangan (Burmese: ဟံဂံရွာ; Mon: ကွာန်ဟံၚ်ဂါမ်) is a village in Ye Township in Mawlamyine District in the Mon State of south-east Burma. Hangan Village is located in the south of Ye Township, about 7 miles (11 km) from Ye Township. About 90% of the population is Mon.
