= Abok =

Abok may refer to:

== Places ==
- Abok, Mon State, a village in south-east Burma in Mon State, Burma
- Abok, Shan State, a village in north-east Burma in Shan State, Burma
- Abok, Malaysia, a small town in Sarawak, Malaysia

== Other uses ==
- The Ashley Book of Knots
