= Daminzeikkyi =

- Location in Burma
- Coordinates: 15°13′N 97°46′E
- Country: Burma
- State: Mon State
- Township: Ye Township
- Elevation: 26 ft (8 m)

Population (2005)
  - Religions: Buddhism
- Time zone: UTC+6.30 (UTC + 6:30)

Daminzeikkyi is a village in Ye Township in the Mon State of south-east Burma. It is located approximately 11 kilometres south-west of Ye city.

Nearby towns and villages include Daminzeik Auk (19.2 nm), Andin (8.0 nm), Saiye (8.0 nm), Duya (3.1 nm), Asin (1.0 nm), Tayoktauk (11.0 nm), Thabya (9.2 nm) and Sidaw (2.8 nm).
