= Andin =

- Location in Burma
- Coordinates: 15°21′N 97°46′E
- Country: Burma
- State: Mon State
- Township: Ye Township
- Elevation: 16 ft (5 m)

Population (2005)
  - Religions: Buddhism
- Time zone: UTC+6.30 (UTC + 6:30)

Andin (Mon: အၚ်ဒၚ်) also spelled An Din, is a village in Ye Township in the Mon State of south-east Burma. It is located approximately 16 kilometres north-west of Ye city.

Nearby towns and villages include Daminzeik Auk (12.1 km), Hnyigarok (1.0 km), Thingangyun (2.2 km), Awainggale (3.5 km), Zuntalin (4.0 km), Daminzeikkyi(8.0 km), Duya(5.1 km), Zayat (3.2 km) and Hnyihnu (2.2 km).
