= Awainggale =

- Location in Myanmar
- Coordinates: 15°23′N 97°49′E
- Country: Myanmar
- State: Mon State
- Township: Ye Township
- Elevation: 52 ft (16 m)

Population (2005)
  - Religions: Buddhism
- Time zone: UTC+6.30 (UTC + 6:30)

Awainggale is a village in Ye Township in the Mon State of south-east Myanmar. It is located approximately 16 kilometres north-west of Ye city.

Nearby towns and villages include Andin (6.48 km), Saiye (6.48 km), Thingangyun (3.51 km), Thinbawzeik (5.92 km), Taungbon (4.07 km), Hmeinsein (4.07 km) and Zuntalin (2.59 km).
