= Hmeinsein =

- Location in Burma
- Coordinates: 15°22′N 97°51′E
- Country: Burma
- State: Mon State
- Township: Ye Township
- Elevation: 69 ft (21 m)

Population (2005)
  - Religions: Buddhism
- Time zone: UTC+6.30 (UTC + 6:30)

Hmeinsein (Burmese: မှန်စိန်) also spelled Hman Sein, is a village in Ye Township in the Mon State of south-east Burma. It is located north-west of Ye city.

Nearby towns and villages include Awainggale (2.2 nm), Zuntalin (1.0 nm), Taungbon (3.1 nm), Sakale (2.8 nm) and Sonmatha (1.4 nm).
