= Ketumala =

Burmese nun (born 1980)

Sayalay Ketumala
- Born: 1980 (age 45–46); Mudon Township, Mawlamyine District, Mon State, Burma
- Citizenship: Myanmar
- Education: Pa-Auk Forest Monastery
- Occupation: Nun (1999–present)

Sayalay Ketumala (born c. 1980) is a Burmese nun. Known for her advocacy for the rights of religious women, she has been described as "arguably the best known nun in Myanmar".

== Biography ==
Ketumala was born in Mudon Township, Mawlamyine District, Mon State. While raised in a Theravada Buddhist family, she did not identify strongly with the religion. When she was 13, she and other female family members were prevented from entering a temple in Mawlamyine where her uncle and cousin were being ordained as monks, which she later identified as being her first experience of gender inequality.

Ketumala decided to become a nun after reading A House Where Mindfulness Is, a philosophical text by U Zawti Ka. She became a thilashin in July 1999 and trained at Pa-Auk Forest Monastery in Mawlamyine. Her family did not agree with her decision to become a nun and did not speak to her for several years. Ketumala went on to gain a bachelor's degree in Buddhist studies from the Buddhist and Pali University of Sri Lanka in Homagama, and a master's degree from the University of Kelaniya in Colombo. She studied for a PhD in the role of Buddhist nuns in Myanmar.

== Activism ==
In Theravada Buddhism, the most practiced denomination practiced in Myanmar, the bhikkuni sangha, the order of ordained women, died out around the 11th century AD. Due to women needing to be ordained by both a bhikkuni sangha and its male equivalent, a bhikku sangha, contemporary women are not able to be formally ordained as nuns, and so technically are trained as thilashin, a renunciant who has taken vows to live according to the Buddha's teachings; though they are commonly referred to as nuns. Thilashins are unable to preach, become senior members of religious communities, or enter certain parts of pagodas. There are around 60, 000 nuns in Myanmar.

Ketumala has become a critic of the lack of gender equality within the Buddhist power system in Myanmar. In 2012, she established the Dhamma School Foundation, which runs over 4800 Buddhist education centres across Myanmar which focus on incorporating Buddhism into daily life over prioritising scriptures and rituals. Despite founding the Dhamma School, due to her status as a nun, Ketumala was unable to be appointed as the foundation's executive and was listed as its secretary; she eventually resigned from the organisation after monks took over the foundation's management board. She went on to establish the Uppalavan Institute in Yangon, which trains people in Buddhist-based conflict transformation, gender equality, and interfaith dialogue.

Ketumala has criticised the "contempt" by which nuns are treated in Myanmar, particularly when compared to the experience of monks, including the more negative view of nuns in Burmese society, as well as a lack of alms donations given to nuns compared to their male counterparts. She has attributed this to Myanmar having a "male-dominated, patriarchal society", and a reluctance of bhikku sangha to discuss issues around gender, with the power imbalance making it difficult for women to raise this issues with Buddhist leadership which is exclusively male. Ketumala stated that there was "no chance" of nuns achieving equal status with monks, and so described herself as using a "soft approach" to call for women to have independence from existing religious power structures. In 2016, she launched a training programme for young nuns teaching them leadership and management skills, and provided similar training for the European Buddhist Youth Forum. Ketumala published a book, Ketumala Nidan, summarising her view on social justice, gender equality, peace and justice; she also produced a film, She, in 2017, about interfaith dialogue between religious women in Myanmar.

== Recognition ==
Ketumala was featured in the 2018 non-fiction book The Other Ladies of Myanmar about influential women in contemporary Myanmar. In 2019, she was named as a fellow of the KAICIID Dialogue Centre.
