= Sonmatha =

- Location in Burma
- Coordinates: 15°21′N 97°52′E
- Country: Burma
- State: Mon State
- Township: Ye Township
- Elevation: 72 ft (22 m)

Population (2005)
  - Religions: Buddhism
- Time zone: UTC+6.30 (MST)

Sonmatha is a village in Ye Township, Mon State, in south-east Myanmar. It is located approximately 8 kilometres directly north of Ye city.

Nearby towns and villages include Zuntalin (2.2 nm), Hmeinsein (1.4 nm), Sakale (3.2 nm), Awaing (2.2 nm), Zayat (2.0 nm), and Pawtaw (1.4 nm).
