= Saive =

== Places ==
- Saive, Wallonia, district of the municipality of Blegny, Belgium
- Saiye, Ghana, also known as Saive

== People with the surname Saive ==
- Dieudonné Saive, Belgian arms designer
- Jean-Michel Saive
- Lambert de Sayve (also spelled Saive and Seave)
