= Da-that Island =

Island in Myanmar

Geography
- Location: Andaman Sea, Myanmar
- Coordinates: 14.9925°N 97.76408°E
- Area: 0.14 km^{2} (0.054 sq mi)

Administration
- Myanmar

Additional information
- Time zone: MST (UTC+6:30)

Da-that Island is an unpopulated island in Myanmar. It is located around 15 miles from Ye, Mon State.
