= Saiye, Myanmar =

Saiye
- Location in Burma
- Coordinates: 15°21′N 97°46′E
- Country: Burma
- State: Mon State
- Township: Ye Township
- Elevation: 16 ft (5 m)

Population (2005)
  - Religions: Buddhism
- Time zone: UTC+6.30 (UTC + 6:30)

Saiye is a village in Ye Township in the Mon State of south-east Burma. It is located approximately 16 kilometres north-west of Ye city.

Nearby towns and villages include Daminzeik Auk (12.1 nm), Hnyigarok (1.0 nm), Thingangyun (2.2 nm), Awainggale (3.5 nm), Zuntalin (4.0 nm), Daminzeikkyi (8.0 nm), Duya (5.1 nm), Zayat (3.2 nm) and Hnyihnu (2.2 nm).
