= Kyonpaw =

- Location in Burma
- Coordinates: 15°18′N 97°51′E
- Country: Burma
- State: Mon State
- Township: Ye Township
- Elevation: 85 ft (26 m)

Population (2005)
  - Religions: Buddhism
- Time zone: UTC+6.30 (MST)

Kyonpaw is a village in Ye Township in the Mon State of south-east Burma. It is located 3 miles north-west of Ye city.

Nearby towns and villages include Zayat (3.9 nm), Hnyihnu (4.0 nm), Zuntalin (4.1 nm), Webaw (2.2 nm), Tumyaung (1.9 nm), and Abaw (3.6 nm).
