= Pitipana North, Homagama =

Coordinates: 6°50′N 80°01′E

Pitipana North, Homagama (also known as Prasannapura North) is an administrative division of the town of Homagama in the Western Province of Sri Lanka. Bearing the grama niladhari code 484, the area had a population of 3,762 in 2012. The area is served by a sub-post office and shares a postcode with Pitipana Central- 10206.

== Education ==
=== Higher education ===
Buddhist and Pali University of Sri Lanka

=== Secondary education ===
Pitipana Maha Vidyalaya

=== Primary education ===
Pitipana Kanishta Vidyalaya
