= Setse =

Setse စက်စဲကမ်းခြေ
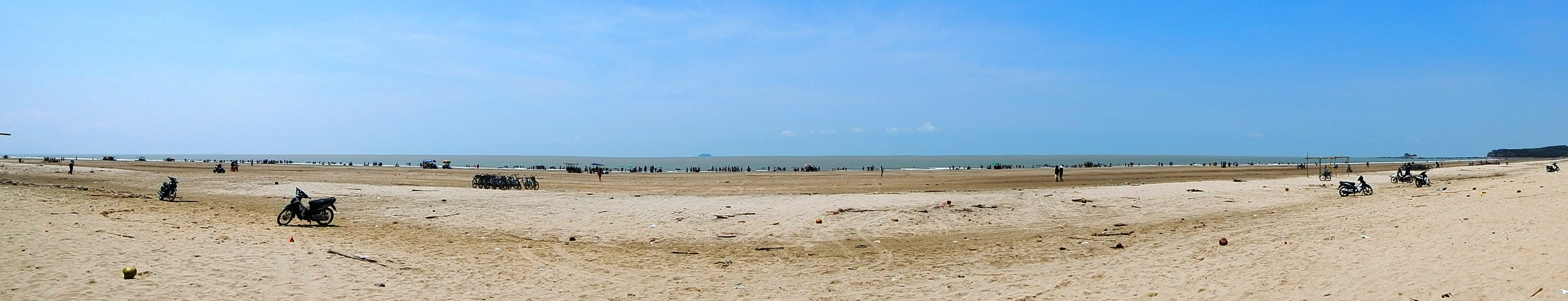

- Location in Burma
- Coordinates: 15°57′N 97°38′E
- Country: Burma
- Division: Mon State
- District: Mawlamyine District
- Township: Thanbyuzayat Township

Population
  - Religions: Buddhism
- Time zone: UTC+6.30 (MST)

Setse (Burmese: စက်စဲကမ်းခြေ) is a beach resort on the Gulf of Martaban of the Andaman Sea in Thanbyuzayat Township, of Mon State, in southern Myanmar. The beach itself is composed of brown sand, is quite wide and about 5.6 kilometers (3.5 mi) long, but the water is often muddy when currents bring down silt from the Salween River which enters the Gulf of Martaban just to the north. Setse has been a resort since the 19th century, and still remains popular.

Mawlamyaing University has its Marine Science Laboratory in Setse, which studies commercial uses of algae (seaweed), cultured pearl techniques, and produces commercial agar-agar. Agar jellies are commonly used in traditional Myanmar desserts and other Asian culinary.
