= Waipathe =

- Location in Burma
- Coordinates: 15°34′53″N 97°55′42″E
- Country: Burma (Myanmar)
- State: Mon State
- District: Mawlamyine District
- Township: Ye Township
- Elevation: 32 m (105 ft)

Population
  - Religions: Buddhism
- Time zone: UTC+6.30 (MST)

Waipathe is a village in Ye Township in Mawlamyine District in the Mon State of south-east Myanmar. Waipathe is on a tributary of the Palantha Chaung, in the foothills of the Tenasserim Range, about 2 kilometres (1.2 mi) west of Dabataw.
