= Dabataw =

- Location in Burma
- Coordinates: 15°35′07″N 97°56′36″E
- Country: Burma (Myanmar)
- State: Mon State
- District: Mawlamyine District
- Township: Ye Township
- Elevation: 45 m (148 ft)

Population
  - Religions: Buddhism
- Time zone: UTC+6.30 (MST)

Dabataw is a village in Ye Township in Mawlamyine District in the Mon State of south-east Burma (Myanmar). Dabataw is on a tributary of the Palantha Chaung, in the foothills of the Tenasserim Range, about 2 kilometres (1.2 mi) east of Waipathe.
