= Kyone Long Ywarthit =

Kyone-Long-Ywar-Thit
- Location in Burma
- Coordinates: 15°15′N 97°54′E
- Country: Burma
- Division: Mon State
- Township: Ye Township

Population (2005)
  - Religions: Buddhism
- Time zone: UTC+6.30 (MST)

Kyone-Long-Ywar-Thit is a village in the Mon State of south-east Myanmar. It lies in Ye Township in Mawlamyine District.

== See also ==
- List of cities, towns and villages in Burma: A
