= Awaing =

- Location in Burma
- Coordinates: 15°21′N 97°52′E
- Country: Burma
- State: Mon State
- Township: Ye Township
- Elevation: 92 ft (28 m)

Population (2005)
  - Religions: Buddhism
- Time zone: UTC+6.30 (UTC + 6:30)

Awaing (Burmese: အဝိုင်း) also spelled Ah Waing is a village in Ye Township in the Mon State of south-east Burma. It is located approximately 14 kilometres north-east of Ye city.

Nearby towns and villages include Sonmatha (2.2 nm), Sakale (2.2 nm), Kaleiktok (3.5 nm), Wekwa (3.9 nm), Pawtaw (2.2 nm) and Awagyaik (2.0 nm).
