= Zuntalin =

- Location in Burma
- Coordinates: 15°22′N 97°50′E
- Country: Burma
- State: Mon State
- Township: Ye Township
- Elevation: 85 ft (26 m)

Population (2005)
  - Religions: Buddhism
- Time zone: UTC+6.30 (UTC + 6:30)

Zuntalin is a village in Ye Township in the Mon State of south-east Burma. It is located north-west of Ye city.

Nearby towns and villages include Andin (4.0 nm), Saiye (4.0 nm), Awainggale (1.4 nm), Hmeinsein (1.0 nm), Sonmatha (2.2 nm), Hnyihnu (4.2 nm), Kyonpaw (4.1 nm) and Zayat (3.6 nm).
