= Kwan Doo =

Kwan Doo Village ကွာန်ကုန်ဒုန်
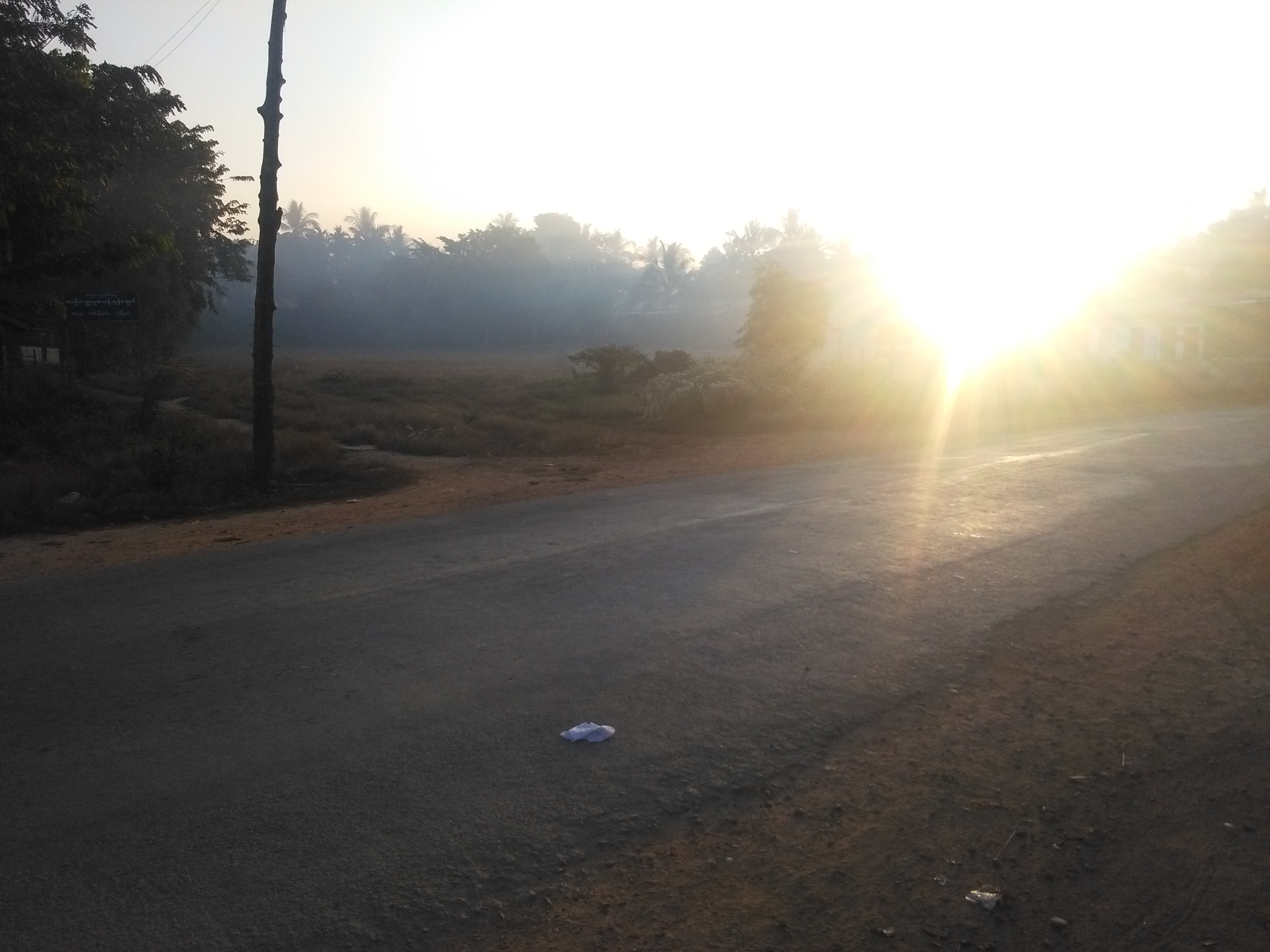

- Location of Kwan Doo Village
- Coordinates: 15°23′49.53″N 97°53′34.98″E
- Country: Burma
- Division: Mon
- Township: Lamaing, Ye

Population
  - Total: 500
  - Ethnicities: Mon
  - Relagions: Buddhism
- Time zone: UTC+6.30 (MST)

Kwan Doo Village (Burmese: ကွမ်းဒူးကျေးရွာ, Mon: ကွာန်ကုန်ဒုန်) is a village located at Lamaing, Mon State, Myanmar (Burma). Most of people are Mon people.

== Notes ==
- (Mon: ကွာန်ကုန်ဒုန်) means Bamboo mount village.
