= Thingangyun =

- Location in Burma
- Coordinates: 15°23′9″N 97°47′9″E
- Country: Myanmar
- State: Mon State
- Township: Ye Township
- Elevation: 56 ft (17 m)

Population (2005)
  - Religions: Buddhism
- Time zone: UTC+6.30 (UTC + 6:30)

Thingangyun (Burmese: သင်္ကန်းကျွန်း; Mon: ကအ်ကွေဟ်) is a village in Ye Township in the Mon State of south-east Burma. It is located north-west of Ye city.

Nearby towns and villages include Zayat (6.3 nm), Thinbawzeik (3.2 nm), Awainggale (1.9 nm), Andin (2.2 nm), Saiye (2.2 nm) and Hnyigarok (1.4 nm).
