= Kyaikmaraw Township =

Coordinates: 16.3667°N 97.7333°E

Kyaikmaraw Township Mon: ပွိုင်ဍုင်ကျာ်မြဟ် Burmese: ကျိုက်မရောမြို့နယ်
- Township
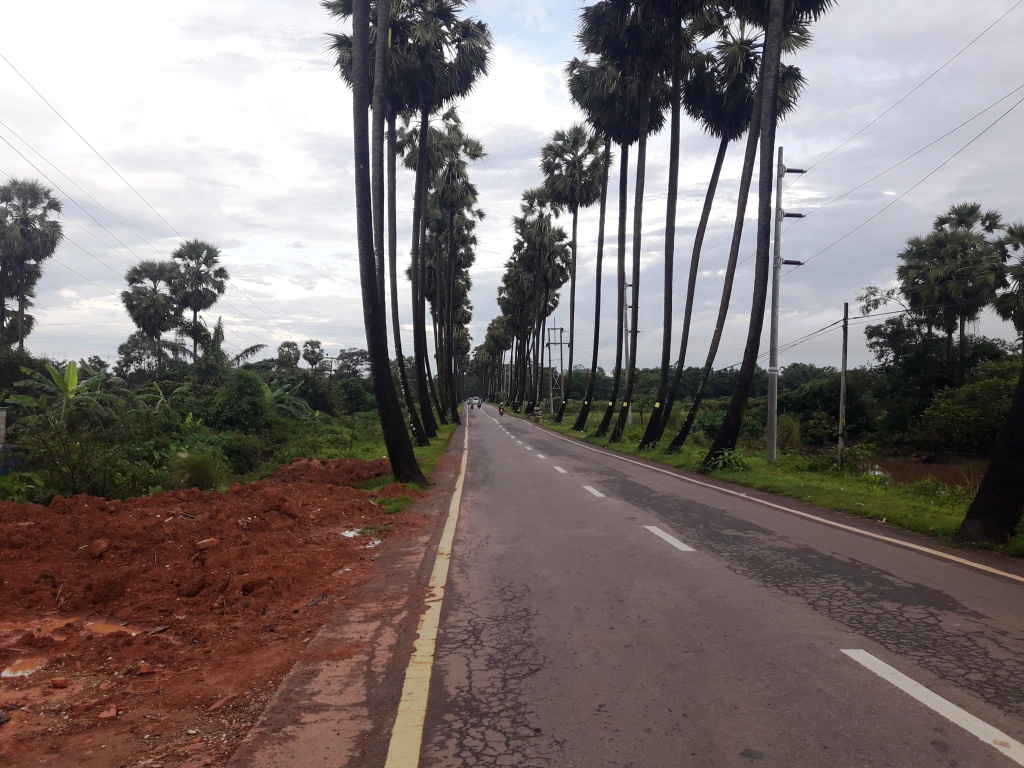
- In 2018

- Map of Mawlamyine district with Kyaikmaraw township in red
- Country: Myanmar
- State: Mon State
- District: Mawlamyine District
- Time zone: UTC+6:30 (MST)

Kyaikmaraw Township (Burmese: ကျိုက်မရောမြို့နယ်; Mon: ပွိုင်ဍုင်ကျာ်မြဟ်) is a township located in Mawlamyine District in the Mon State of Myanmar. It is bordered by the Kayin State townships of Kawkareik to its east, Kyain Seikgyi to its south, and Hpa-an to its north, and in Mon State by Mudon and Mawlamyine to its west and north respectively. Its principal town is Kyaikmaraw. The township is mainly populated by the Mon people and has a mainly agricultural economy.

== History ==
Recent fighting against the Tatmadaw in the township began on 10 November 2023 when armed ethnic groups launched an attack on a police station in Chaunghnekhwa. A coalition force of the Karen National Liberation Army, Kawthoolei Army and the People's Defence Force destroyed a Attran bridge near Chaunghnekhwa on 17 November claiming it was located on a logistic support route for the Tatmadaw. Fighting has since displaced 20,000 people.
