= Hnyihnu =

Hnyee Hnyu
- Location in Burma
- Coordinates: 15°19′N 97°47′E
- Country: Burma
- State: Mon State
- Township: Ye Township
- Elevation: 20 ft (6 m)

Population (2005)
  - Religions: Buddhism
- Time zone: UTC+6.30 (UTC + 6!30)

Hnyihnu (Burmese: သၞေဟ်ဇၞူ) also spelled Hnyee Hnyu, is a village in Ye Township in the Mon State of south-east Burma. It is located approximately 12 kilometres north-west of Ye city.

Nearby towns and villages include Andin (2.2 nm), Saiye (2.2 nm), Zuntalin (4.2 nm), Kyonpaw (4:0 nm) and Zayat (1.0 nm).
