= Duya =

Duya may refer to:

- Duya, Myanmar
- Duya language
