= Mahn Thet San =

- မန်းသက်စံ
- Born: 1930; Kawhnat village, Moulmein Township, British Burma
- Died: 10 October 2008 (aged 78); Mayangone Township, Yangon, Myanmar
- Resting place: Yayway Cemetery, Yangon
- Education: University of Illinois (M.S. Chemistry, 1955) (Ph.D. Chemistry, 1957)
- Occupation: Academic
- Spouse: Htay Yee
- Children: 2

Mahn Thet San (Burmese: မန်းသက်စံ; 1930–2008) was a Burmese academic and civil servant of ethnic Mon descent, known for his work in preserving Mon literature and culture. Born in Kawhnat village in Moulmein Township, he was educated at the University of Illinois, where he earned master's and doctoral degrees in chemistry in 1955 and 1957 respectively. He served as the deputy minister of the Ministry of Industry, and as rector of Moulmein College and Bassein Degree College.

Thet San died on 10 October 2008 at his home in Mayangone Township, Yangon and was subsequently buried at Yayway Cemetery. He was 78 (in his 79th year).
