= Mawlamyine University =

University in Mawlamyine, Myanmar

Coordinates: 16°26′22″N 97°39′2″E

- မော်လမြိုင် တက္ကသိုလ်
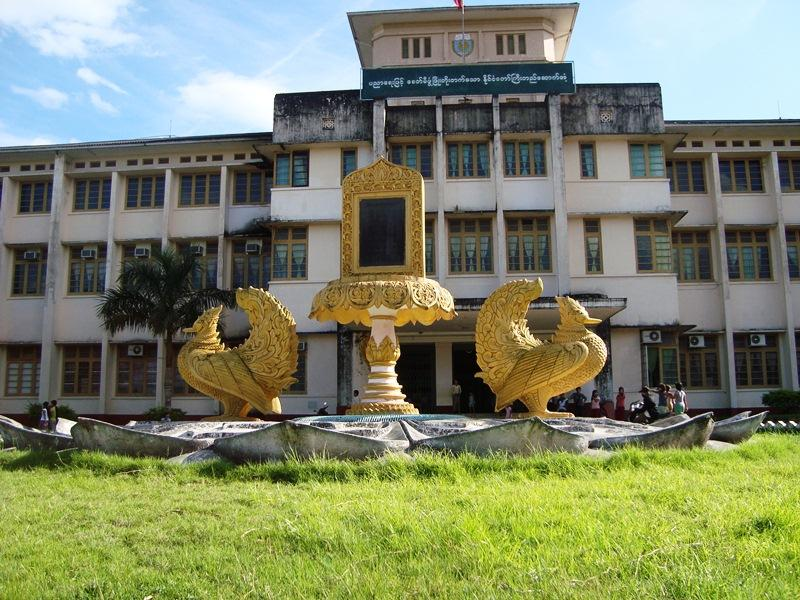
- Former names: Moulmein Intermediate College (1953); Mawlamyaing Degree College (1964); Mawlamyine Regional College (1977)
- Motto: Enshrine the education, serves the peoples' will
- Type: Public
- Established: 1953; 73 years ago
- Affiliations: University of Yangon
- Rector: Dr Chit Sein
- Students: Full-time – 30,000; Distance (Part-time) – 40,000; Total – 70,000 (2019)
- Location: Taungwaing Road, Mawlamyine, Mon State, Myanmar
- Campus: Urban
- Colours: Golden yellow
- Mascot: Hamsa (bird)

Mawlamyine University (also the University of Mawlamyine; Burmese: မော်လမြိုင် တက္ကသိုလ် [mɔ̀ləmjàɪɰ̃ tɛʔkəθò]), located in Mawlamyine, is the largest university in Mon State, Myanmar. Established in 1953, Mawlamyine University is the third oldest Arts and Science university in the country after Yangon University (est 1878) and Mandalay University (est 1925). The university offers bachelor's and master's degree programs in liberal arts and sciences. It is one of the few universities in the country to offer a specialization in marine science.

== History ==
=== Foundation ===
The university was founded in 1953 as Moulmein Intermediate College under Rangoon University.

==== Selecting the site ====
The beautiful landscape and its environment was an ideal site for a college. The site of the college was located about four miles northeast of the downtown section of Moulmein (Mawlamyine). When it was founded in the early 1950s, the size of the college was 417.87 acres. It was bounded by Moulmein-Taungwaing, main road and Moulmein-Amherst roads. On the east side of the site, there is a mountain called Taungwaing mountain, half a mile away from the college. About a quarter of a mile away from the college across the Moulmein-Taungwaing road, there was a former WWII airfield (now Mawlamyine Airport) used by the Royal Air Force and the American Flying Tigers.

Before construction of the college, Taungwaing mountain and its surrounding areas had been a camping site for the British administrators and local elites and the gardens of local Chinese community during the colonial period in the 19th and early 20th centuries. According to Howard Malcom, an American traveler in 1836, early settlers of the Moulmein Chinese community made a living by growing vegetables and fruits in Taungwaing (hill-circle in Burmese, ling-ding in Chinese) and its surrounding areas.

=== Expansion ===
It was renamed Mawlamyaing Degree College in 1964. In 1977, the 2-year regional college system was introduced by the Burmese government, it had become Mawlamyine Regional College.

On 15 December 1982, the technological department was separated from the college to form Government Technical Institute (now Mawlamyine Technological University). Eventually, Mawlamyine Regional College became an independent university in 1986.

=== Recent history ===
On 14 June 2018, State Counsellor Aung San Suu Kyi and youths from the Mon, Karen and Pa’oh ethnic groups held a conference at Mawlamyine University. The attendees included Union Ministers from the Cabinet of Myanmar, Mon State's Chief Minister, MPs and the local residents of Mawlamyine. The panel discussion was aired live on government television channels, the social media pages of the Myanmar State Counsellor's office, Office of the President of Myanmar and the Information Committee Office.

== Academic profile ==
=== Entrance ===
University entrance to a particular undergraduate degree program derives from students' tenth grade standard examination marks. The Ministry of Education (Myanmar) runs the matriculation exams, which occur at the same time annually around country.

=== Programs ===
Classified as an Arts and Science university in the Burmese university education system, Mawlamyine University offers bachelor's and master's degree programs in common liberal arts and sciences disciplines. Its regular Bachelor of Arts (BA) and Bachelor of Science (BSc) take four years to complete and honors degree programs BA (Hons) and BSc (Hons) take five years. The law program also takes five years.

Mawlamyine University pioneered the study of coastal and marine science in Myanmar. Mawlamyine University is one of few universities in Myanmar, offering a degree in Marine Science. Its Marine Science Laboratory in Setse, a coastal town about 83 km south of Mawlamyine was the first of its kind in Myanmar. As of July 2018, Mawlamyine University has 17 academic majors for full-time undergrad students.

Program	Bachelor's	Master's	Doctorate
Burmese	BA	MA	
English	BA	MA	
Geography	BA	MA	
History	BA	MA	
Philosophy	BA	MA	
Psychology	BA	MA	
Botany	BSc	MSc	
Law	LLB	LLM	
Chemistry	BSc	MSc	
Marine Science	BSc	MSc	PhD
Mathematics	BSc	MSc	
Physics	BSc	MSc	PhD
Oriental Studies	BSc	MSc	
Zoology	BSc	MSc	
Geology	BSc	MSc	
Biochemistry	BSc		
Microbiology	BSc		

== Administration ==
=== Current ===
The current rector of the university is Dr. Chit Sein and the current pro-rector is Dr. Mi Mi Sein.

=== List of rectors (1953– present) ===
1. Toe Aung (Ku Tha) (March 1953 – July 1963)
2. Dr. Mahn Thet San
3. Dr. Maung Di (1972–1977)
4. Khin Maung Tint (Tekkatho Phone Naing), from 1977 to 1985 as head of Mawlamyaing Degree College and from 1986 to 1988 as vice-chancellor of Mawlamyine University
5. Hla Tun Aung
6. Kyi Win
7. San Tint
8. Saw Han Shein
9. Dr. Kyaw Tin Nwe (WYTU)
10. Dr. Aung Myat Kyaw Sein
11. Dr. Htay Aung

== Facilities ==
=== Important Buildings ===
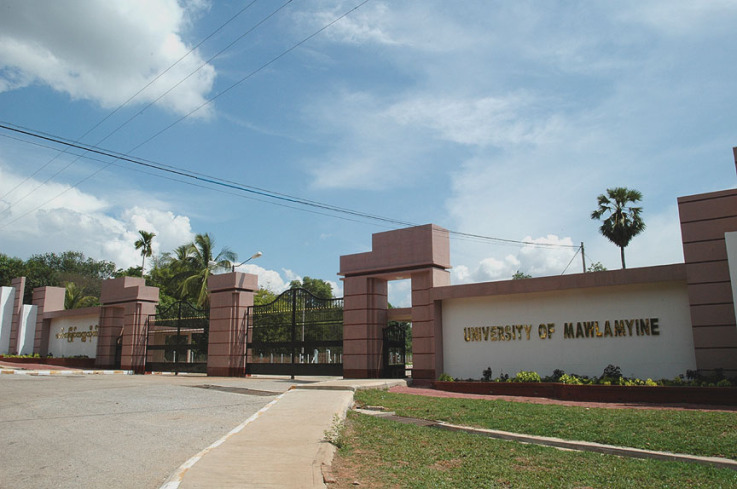
Chancellor Road and main entrance of the University of Mawlamyine

- University of Mawlamyine Library: The university's three-story library, completed in January 2004, houses over 106,000 books and periodicals. As a result of partnership with the Tekkatho Foundation, which is regulated by the Charity Commission in England and Wales, students can access eTekkatho library, a free digital library of research and learning resources. Moreover, students have access to international journals, databases and e-books of academic and research institutions through EIFL eLibrary funded by the Open Society Foundations' Higher Education Support Programme (HESP).
- University's Dhamma Hall
- Binnya Dala Lecture Building: The lecture hall is named after Binnya Dala, a famous Mon scholar and chief advisor to Bayinnaung of Toungoo Empire, the largest empire in the history of Southeast Asia.
- Yamanya Lecture Building
- Convocation Hall
- Men's dormitories with dining room: built in the 1950s.
- Women's dormitory with dining room: built in the 1950s.
- Setse Marine Station: A Marine Science Research Centre in Setse, a Sea – coast town about 60 kilometers south of Mawlamyine.
- University's Hospital: 16-bedded hospital has been located in the east wing of main campus. It is in use again now after long abandonment.
- University's Sport Hall
- University's Post Office: Mawlamyine University has its own post office and the postal code is 12012.

== Student life ==
=== Accommodation ===
The university has limited number of residential accommodation options. Most of the on-campus accommodations were built in the 1950s. Following pro-democracy protest in 1988, on-campus accommodation was closed by the authority, and it was reopened only in 2013.

The on-campus accommodation is operated by Mawlamyine University's Students' Affairs Department. Currently, there are five halls of residence in the campus; namely Thandar, Mawlamyine (Moulmein), Nilar (Sapphire), Pu-le (Pearl) and Shwe Myaing building. The average rent for students is 5000 kyat (approximately US$5) per month and a shared meal costs 500 kyat per meal. Nevertheless, students prefer to live in off-campus accommodation rather than on-campus accommodation.

=== Organisation ===
Numerous student organizations are registered in the university. Some are regional societies organised to promote fellowship among students from particular geographical areas. Others are identified with particular academic disciplines such as physics, chemistry, and mathematics known as course-related organizations, and still others belong to the special or interest groups. The most prominent organisations among them are Mawlamyine University Students' Union, Mawlamyine University's Literature and Culture Association (Burmese: မော်လမြိုင် တက္ကသိုလ် စာပေနှင့် ယဉ်ကျေးမှုအသင်း) and Mawlamyine University's Hiking and Mountaineering Association (Burmese: မော်လမြိုင် တက္ကသိုလ် ခြေလျင်နှင့်တောင်တက်အသင်း).

Moreover, students from Mawlamyine University are entitled to join University Training Corp (Burmese: တက္ကသိုလ် လေ့ကျင့်ရေးတပ်(မော်လမြိုင်)) as an extracurricular activity for basic military training. Mawlamyine University is one of the four universities in Myanmar which have University Training Corp (UTC).

=== Media ===
Mawlamyine University's magazine, formerly known as Moulmein College's Mid-term magazine, is officially published annually. Dr. Khin Maung Nyo, a well known author and an alumnus of the university served as an editor for the magazine from 1977 to 1983.

== International collaboration ==
=== Research ===
- (Thailand) Prince of Songkla University: Mawlamyine University is developing many research projects with Prince Songkla University.
- (Philippines) Silliman University: Mawlamyine University maintains research and academic linkages with Silliman University.
- (United States) Scripps Institution of Oceanography (SIO): Mawlamyine University joined "pointb" international marine science project coordinated by SIO.
- (Japan) Tokyo University of Marine Science and Technology: The University of Mawlamyine has international exchange agreements with the Tokyo University of Marine Science and Technology since March 2015.
- (Austria) University of Natural Resources and Life Sciences (BOKU), Vienna: The university is promoting collaboration in bird research with BOKU.

=== Teaching ===
- (Australia) BABSEACLE: In co-operation with USAID and BABSEACLE, an Australian non-profit legal education organization, Law Department of Mawlamyine University provides CLE programmes to final year law students.
- (United States) Cornell University: Mawlamyine University is collaborating with Cornell University in marine sciences and English training.
- (Australia) University of New South Wales: Football United of the University of New South Wales has been working with Myanmar Red Cross Society and Mawlamyine University to develop a medium of football to promote positive youth development in disadvantaged communities of Mawlamyine.

=== Student and staff exchange ===
- (Japan) Hosei University: Mawlamyine University is collaborating with Hosei University in student and staff exchange.
- (United States) Indiana University – Purdue University Fort Wayne (IPFW): The city of Mawlamyine established a Friendship City agreement with Fort Wayne, Indiana, USA in 2016. As a co-operation between the two cities, student exchange between Mawlamyine University and IPFW of Fort Wayne started in early 2017. Exchange students from Mawlamyine University will arrive IPFW starting in summer 2018.
- (Thailand) Khon Kaen University: The possibilities for student & staff exchanges and academic collaboration between the two universities are under discussion.
- (Japan) University of Tokyo: Mawlamyine University is collaborating with Tokyo University in student and staff exchange.

== Notable former staff ==
Name	Faculty/Notability	Reference
Toe Aung (Pseudonym Ku Tha)	A leading writer of Khit-San Sarpay movement in the 1930s British Burma, which is considered the first modern literary movement in the history of Burmese Literature. He served as the head of Moulmein College from 1953 to 1963.	
Tekkatho Phone Naing	A famous Burmese writer and poet, worked as a lifelong university professor and later Chancellor of the University of Mawlamyine.	
Khin Maung Nyunt	An eminent Burmese writer and historian, worked as senior lecturer and departmental head from 1961 to 1975.	
Mahn Thet San	Served as a head of Moulmein College and later as Deputy Minister for Ministry of Industry.	
Mohana Gill	A famous Indian writer, worked for Moulmein Intermediate College in the 1950s.	
Myint Than (Kahtika Daw Myint Than)	A prominent scholar and a member of Myanmar Language Commission, worked as assistant lecturer at the Moulmein Intermediate College in the 1950s	
Mehm Tin Mon	A prominent writer, worked as a Professor of Chemistry at the university.	
Nanda Thein Zan	A well-known philosophy writer, worked at the university.	
Aung Thin	National Literary Award-winning writer, worked as an assistant lecturer from 1963 to 1965	

== Notable alumni ==
Name	Notability	Reference
Htoo Ein Thin	Singer-songwriter	
Cynthia Maung	Founder of Mae Tao Non-profit Clinic, 2003 Time Magazine's Asian Hero, 2013 Sydney Peace Prize winner and 2018 UNDP's N-Peace Award recipient	
Sayawun Tin Shwe	A physician and 1963 National Literature Award winning writer. The Sayawun Tin Shwe Award is named after him.	
Mar Mar Khaing	Member of the House of Representatives	
Nai Thet Lwin	Union Minister of Ethnic Affairs in the government of President Htin Kyaw and President Win Myint	
Thet Naing Win	Union Minister of Border Affairs and lieutenant general of Myanmar Army	
Maung Thin	Rector of Mandalay University (2014–2015), Member of the House of Representatives, Minister for Ministry of Youth Affairs	
Khin Maung Nyo	Chemistry professor, writer and editor. He also worked at the college from 1964 to 1968.	
Saw Tun	Member of the House of Representatives	
Nan Ni Ni Aye	Vice President of Myanmar	
Thiri Yadanar	Member of the House of Nationalities	
Aye Lwin (politician)	Colonel in Myanmar Military and Pyithu Hluttaw MP elected representative	
