= Saw Tun =

Burmese politician

Member of Pyithu Hluttaw
- Incumbent
- Assumed office 3 February 2016
- Constituency: Mudon Township

Personal details
- Born: 1 September 1966 (age 60) Mudon, Mon State, Myanmar
- Party: National League for Democracy
- Spouse: Lwin Lwin Cho
- Parent(s): Kyaw Myint (father); Thein Kyin (mother)
- Education: Mawlamyine University

Saw Tun (Burmese: စောထွန်း, also spelt Saw Htun; born 1 September 1966) is a Burmese politician who currently serves as a Pyithu Hluttaw member of parliament for Mudon Township. He is a member of the National League for Democracy politician.

== Early life and education ==
Saw Tun was born on 1 September 1966 in Mudon, Mon State, Myanmar. He is an ethnic Mon. He graduated with B.Sc (physics) from Mawlamyine University.

== Political career ==
He is a member of the National League for Democracy Party politician, he was elected as Pyithu Hluttaw representative for Mudon parliamentary constituency.
