= Technological University, Mawlamyaing =

University of technology in Burma

Technological University (Mawlamyine)
- နည်းပညာ တက္ကသိုလ် (မော်လမြိုင်)
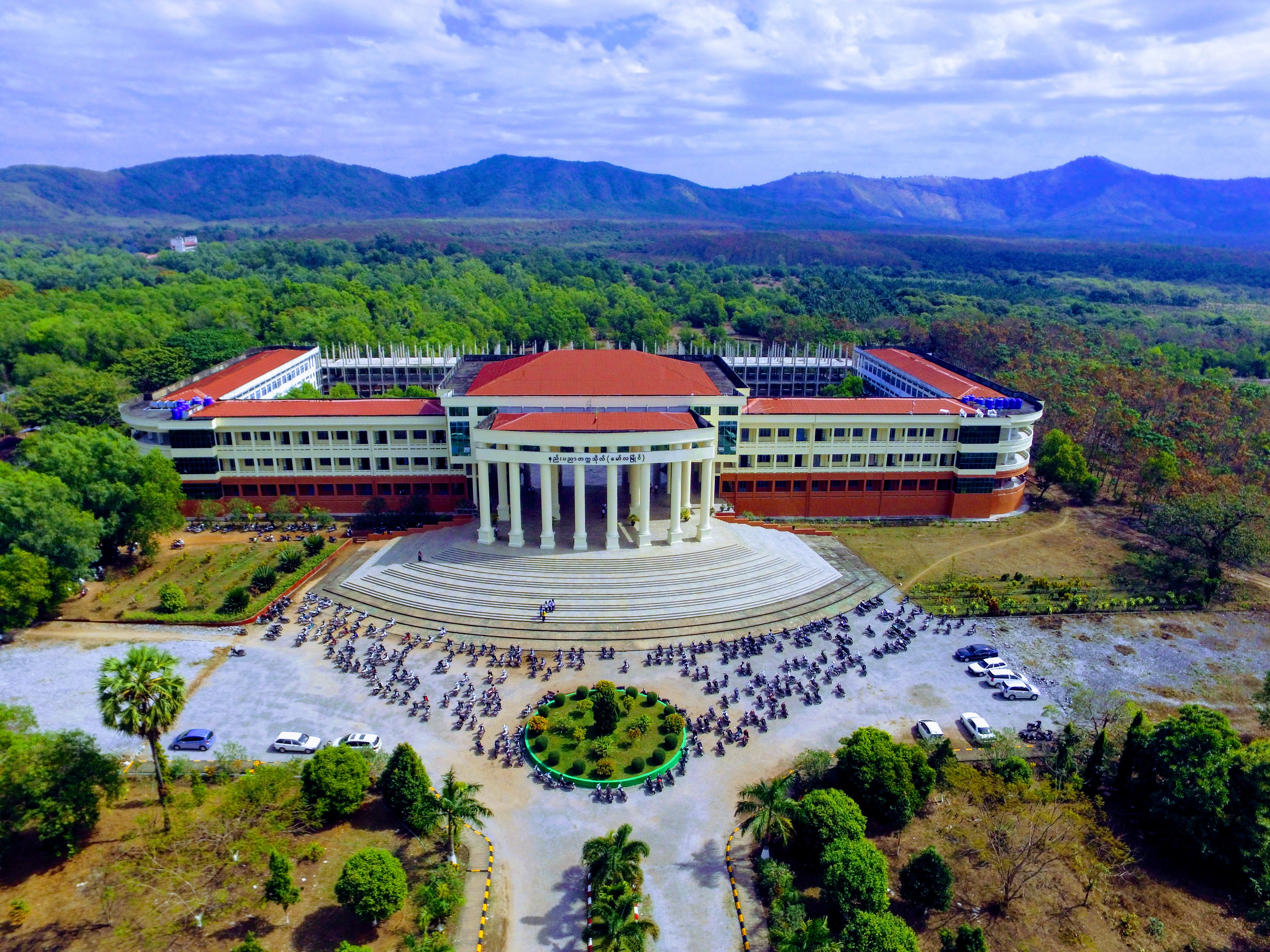
- Former names: Government Technical Institute (Mawlamyine) 1982; Government Technological College (Mawlamyine) 1999
- Type: Public
- Established: 1982; 44 years ago
- Affiliations: Ministry of Education
- Rector: Dr. Min Zaw Aung
- Location: Mawlamyine, Mon State, Myanmar; 16°21′53.2″N 97°40′7″E
- Campus: Suburban
- Website: tumawlamyine.edu.mm

Technological University, Mawlamyine (Burmese: နည်းပညာ တက္ကသိုလ် (မော်လမြိုင်)) is a technological and engineering university located in Mawlamyine, Mon State, Burma.

During the academic year 2015–2016, a total of 2,203 students were enrolled at the Technological University (Mawlamyine).

== History ==
On 15 December 1982, the technological department was separated from Mawlamyine University to form Government Technical Institute (Mawlamyine). It was renamed as Government Technological College (Mawlamyine) in 1999. It became an independent university in 2007.

== Departments ==
- Civil Engineering Department
- Electronic and Communication Engineering Department
- Electrical Power Engineering Department
- Mechanical Engineering Department
- Information Technology Department

== Former Department ==
- Mechatronics Engineering Department

== Programs ==
Graduate Program	Degree	year
Bachelor of Civil Engineering	B.E. (Civil)	6yrs
Bachelor of Electronic and Communication Engineering	B.E. (EC)	6yrs
Bachelor of Electrical Power Engineering	B.E. (EP)	6yrs
Bachelor of Mechanical Engineering	B.E. (ME)	6yrs
Bachelor of Information Technology	B.E. (IT)	6yrs
