= Aye Lwin (politician) =

Burmese politician

Col Aye Lwin

Member of the Pyithu Hluttaw
- Incumbent
- Assumed office 3 February 2016
- Constituency: Military Representative

Personal details
- Born: 14 September 1970 (age 55) Thazi, Myanmar
- Spouse: Su Su Htwe
- Children: 3

Aye Lwin is a Myanmar (formerly Burmese) politician who currently serves as a member of Pyithu Hluttaw. He is a colonel in the Myanmar military.

== Early life and education ==
Aye Lwin was born on 14 September 1970 in Thazi, Myanmar. He graduated Bachelor of Arts in History from Mawlamyine University.

== Political career ==
He is a colonel in the Burmese military. He was elected as a Pyithu Hluttaw MP elected representative from the military at the 2015 Myanmar general election.
