= Pa-Auk Forest Monastery =

Theravāda forest monastery in Mawlamyine, Mon State

Coordinates: 16°22′11″N 97°40′14″E

- ဖားအောက်တောရကျောင်း
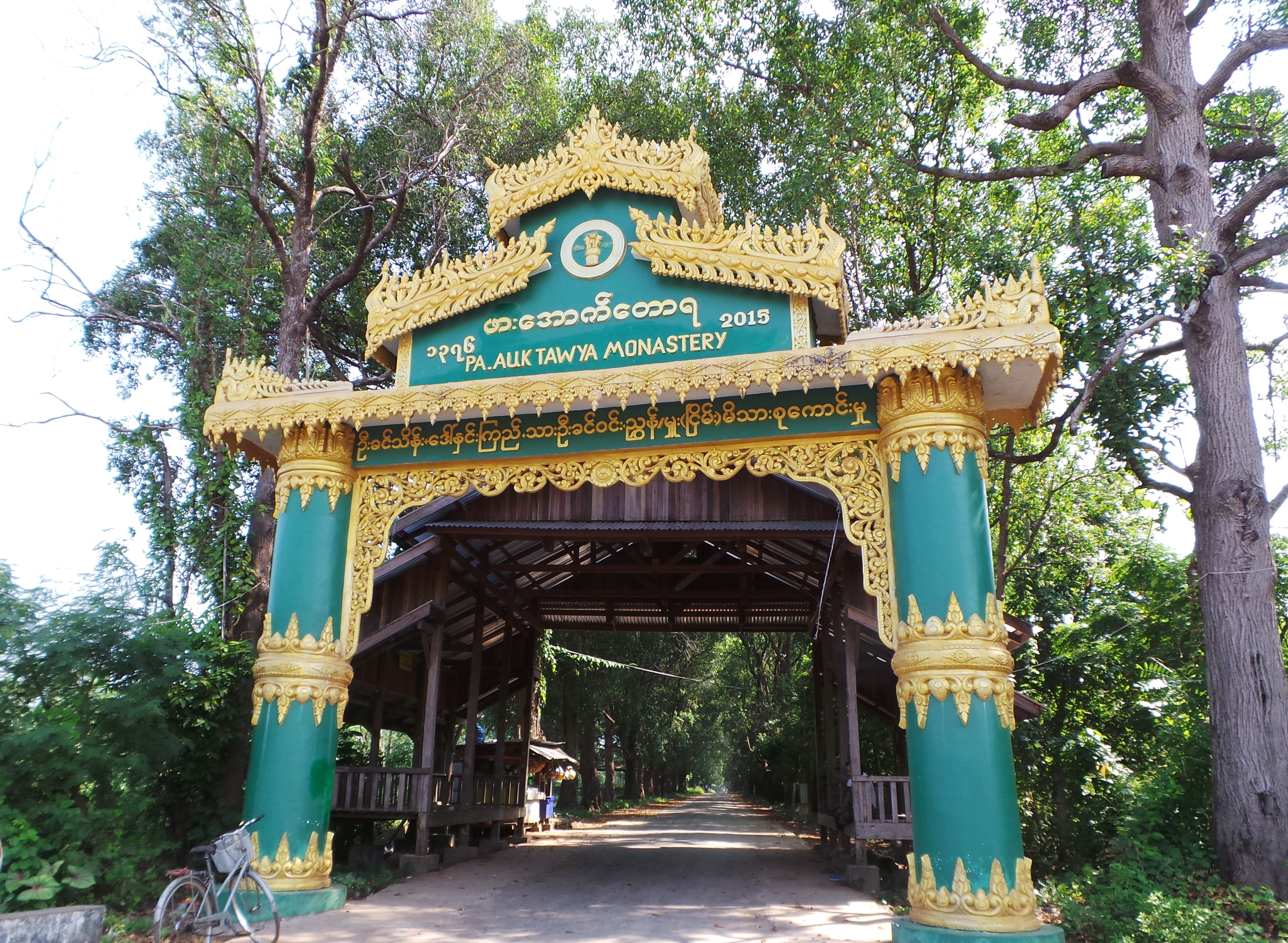

Religion
- Affiliation: Buddhism
- Sect: Theravāda
- Ecclesiastical or organisational status: Forest monastery
- Leadership: The Most Ven. Bhaddanta Āciṇṇa

Location
- Municipality: Mawlamyine
- State: Mon State
- Country: Myanmar
- Interactive map of Pa-Auk Forest Monastery

Architecture
- Established: 1926

Website
- www.paaukforestmonastery.org

The Pa-Auk Forest Monastery, known in Burmese as the Pa-Auk Tawya (Burmese: ဖားအောက်တောရကျောင်း, MLCTS: Hpa:auk Tau:ra.kyaung:), is a Theravāda monastery in the village of Pa-Auk in Mawlamyine, Mon State, Myanmar. It is situated in a tropical forest along the Dawna Range. It is the main monastery complex and meditation centre of the Pa-Auk Group, Pa-Auk Society, or Pa-Auk Foundation that comprises over 40 branches and associate centres in Myanmar and various countries. The Most Ven. Bhaddanta Āciṇṇa has been its abbot since 1981, succeeding the Ven. Phelhtaw Sayadaw Aggapañña at the latter's request.

The monastery provides an ideal setting for the long-term practice of meditation. The number of residents varies seasonally from approximately 1,500 to 2,500 during festive periods. This includes more than 300 foreign monks, nuns and lay practitioners, originating from over 20 countries.

== Pa Auk Tawya Branches ==
=== Burmese Branches ===
1. 18 miles 3 furlongs, Highway, Hle Ku
2. Kan Hla Yik Thar School, Kan Hla Village, near Magway Airport, Magway Division
3. Kaw Wale, Kyong Do, Karen State
4. Kan Bya In Kyin Myaing Towra, Salin, Magway Division
5. Kyong Phaik Towra, Mudon Township, Mon State
6. Kyauk Kla, Thein Zayet, Kyaik Tho, Mon State
7. Kyauk Gu Kyaung, Metta Lin Myaing Village, Myawaddy Township, Karen State
8. Kyauk Tan, Yangon Southern District
9. Kyintali, Thandwe Township, Rakhine State
10. Sa Lin Gyi, Sagaing Region
11. Sison Taung, Kin Village, Paung, Mon State
12. Zamyun Taung Towra, Wek Kali Village, Thanbyuzayat Township
13. Extended (2) Ward, Hmawbi Township, Yangon Region
14. Taung Waing Gyi Wildlife Sanctuary Mawlamyine
15. Tattu Dhamma Yeiktha (Extended) Pyin Oo Lwin
16. Dawei, Tanintharyi Region
17. Natsan Tawra, Kume, Myit Thar, Mandalay Region
18. Nam San Township, Southern Shan State
19. Bago, Myo Shwe Road, Bago Region
20. Pyin Oo Lwin (1), Mandalay Region
21. Pyin Oo Lwin (2), Mandalay Region
22. Pha Klay, Ye, Mon State
23. Pha Auk Tawra (Main), Pha Auk, Mawlamyine
24. Hpa-an, Karen State
25. Hpa-an, Karen State
26. Maayi Lake, Aryataw, Sagaing Region
27. Maha Bodhi Seminary, Baw Gyi Village, Tot Kyant, Mingalardon Township
28. Mandalay Mountain Foothills, Mandalay, Mandalay Region
29. Myeik, Tanintharyi Region
30. Shwe Gu Si Kyaung, Kyaukka (North), Monywa Township
31. Shwe Nyaung Pin, Kone Talone Village, Myan Aung Township
32. Hle Ku, Yangon Region
33. Wan Nat Chaung, Hmawbi, Yangon Region
34. Wimutti Tow, Nyaung Mak Village, 9 Mile, Pulaw Township, Tanintharyi Region
35. Thukhathitala Land, Ingapu Township, Ayeyarwady Region
36. Shan San Tow, Kyong Ka, Paung, Mon State
37. Shan Lyin, Yangon Southern District
38. Sallay Kha Patipat Yeiktha, Hmawbi, Yangon Region
39. He Ho, Pha Aok Tow, Ba Ning Village Tract, between Ywa Daw Village and Myak Set Village, Kalaw Township
40. Alone, Monywa, Sagaing Region
41. Ingapu, Ayeyarwady Region
42. Intakaw, Bago Region

== Notable students ==
- Ketumala - nun.
