= Thiri Yadanar =

Burmese politician (born 1979)

- သီရိရတနာ

Member of the House of Nationalities
- Incumbent
- Assumed office 3 February 2016
- Constituency: Mon State № 12
- Majority: 34,527 votes

Personal details
- Born: 21 September 1979 (age 47) Bilin, Mon State
- Party: National League for Democracy
- Parent(s): Min Lwin (father); Tin Tin Aye (mother)
- Education: Mawlamyine University

Thiri Yadanar (Burmese: သီရိရတနာ; born on 12 September 1979) is a Burmese politician who currently serves as a member of parliament in the House of Nationalities for Mon State № 12 constituency. She is a member of the National League for Democracy.

== Early life and education ==
Thiri Yadanar was born in Bilin, Mon State on September 21, 1979. She graduated with B.A. (history) from Mawlamyine University. Her former work is trader.

== Political career ==
She is a member of the National League for Democracy. In the 2015 Myanmar general election, she contested the Mon State № 12 constituency winning a majority of 34,527 votes, and won a House of Nationalities seat.
