= Khawzar =

Khawzar ခေါဇာမြို့
- Town
- Location within Myanmar
- Coordinates: 15.037524°N 97.829346°E
- Country: Myanmar
- State: Mon State
- District: Mawlamyine District

Population (2014)
  - Town: 22,663
  - Urban: 3,844
  - Rural: 18,819
- Time zone: UTC+6.30 (Myanmar Standard Time)

Khawzar (Burmese: ခေါဇာမြို့; also spelt Khawsa) is a town located in Mawlamyine District, Mon State of Myanmar. It is also a sub-township in Ye Township. Khawsa lies on the Khawsa Chaung about 5 kilometres (3.1 mi) from the coast of the Andaman Sea. It is protected from the sea by a 259 metres (850 ft) hill and the 860 metres (2,822 ft) Mount Pawdaing rises to the east.
