= Mar Mar Khaing =

Burmese politician and lawyer

- မာမာခိုင်

Member of the House of Representatives
- Incumbent
- Assumed office 1 February 2016
- Preceded by: Saw Ba Thein (USDP)
- Constituency: Thaton Township
- Majority: 48,283 (53.95%)

Personal details
- Born: 20 April 1961 (age 65) Thaton, Burma
- Party: National League for Democracy
- Parent: U Kauk (father)
- Education: Mawlamyine University of Distance Education (LL.B)
- Occupation: Politician, Lawyer

Mar Mar Khaing (Burmese: မာမာခိုင်, also spelt Mar Mar Khine; born 20 April 1961) is a Burmese politician and lawyer who currently serves as a member of parliament in the House of Representatives for Thaton Township. In the 2015 Myanmar general election, she contested the Thaton Township constituency for a seat in the Pyithu Hluttaw MP, the country's lower house.

== Early life and career ==
Mar Mar Khaing was born on 20 April 1961 in Thaton, Mon State, Myanmar. She is an ethnic Pa-O. She attended at Basic Education High School No. 2 Thaton and graduated with Law from Mawlamyine University of Distance Education.

In 1980 to 1985, she had worked at Thaton Construction Corporation. In 1989, she had worked Senior lawyer and became lawyer of the Supreme Court of Myanmar in 1999. In the 2015 Myanmar general election, she contested the Thaton Township constituency winning a majority of 48,283 (53% of the votes), which won her a Pyithu Hluttaw seat.
