= Kin, Myanmar =

Kin
- Location in Burma
- Coordinates: 15°13′53″N 97°49′32″E
- Country: Burma (Myanmar)
- State: Mon State
- District: Mawlamyine District
- Township: Ye Township
- Elevation: 4 m (13 ft)

Population
  - Religions: Buddhism
- Time zone: UTC+6.30 (MST)

Kin is a village in Ye Township in Mawlamyine District in the Mon State of south-east Myanmar. It is located on the right bank (northern side) of the Ye River.
