= Maung Thin =

Burmese politician

Dr Maung Thin
- မောင်သင်း

Member of the House of Representatives
- In office 1 February 2016 – 31 January 2021
- Constituency: Meiktila Township
- Majority: 96,314 (58.80%)

Rector of Mandalay University
- In office 6 May 2014 – 31 July 2015
- Preceded by: Khin Swe Myint
- Succeeded by: Saw Pyone Naing

Rector of Meiktila University
- In office 27 June 2008 – 6 May 2014

Personal details
- Born: 13 April 1955 (age 71) Myanmar
- Party: Union Solidarity and Development Party
- Parent: U Marci (father)
- Education: Yangon University (B.Sc)(M.Sc); University of Marburg (Ph.D)
- Occupation: Politician, Rector

Photo of Dr. Maung Thin

Dr Maung Thin (Burmese: မောင်သင်း; born 13 April 1955) was a Burmese politician and rector who currently serves as a Member of parliament in the Pyithu Hluttaw. In the 2015 Myanmar general election, he contested the Meiktila Township constituency for a seat in the Pyithu Hluttaw MP, the country's lower house.

== Early life and education ==
He learned his primary education in Thanatpin. He attended in Mawlamyine University and Yangon University from 1973 to 1983. He graduated with bachelor's and master's degrees in botany in these universities. He studied at University of Marburg, Germany from 1985 to 1989 and got Ph.D. He learned Cryobiology in Jadavpur University as postgraduate student from 26 June 1990 to 17 July 1990. He attended postgraduate Research Programme in University of Marburg 1996, 1999 and 2001.

== Educational career ==
He served as demonstrator in Botany Department of Institute of Medicine 1 from 1980 to 1981. He served as demonstrator and assistant lecturer in Yangon University from 1 January 1982 to 31 December 1992, served as assistant lecturer and lecturer in Mawlamyine University from 7 January 1993 to 31 May 2000. He moved to Botany Department of Taungoo University as associate professor from 1 June 2000 to 11 December 2001. He became professor and head of Department of Botany in Mandalay University from 12 December 2001 to 21 November 2005. Meanwhile, he served as visiting professor from 17 January to 14 March 2004. He was promoted as vice rector of new Yadanabon University in 21 November 2005 until 31 March 2007. From 1 April 2007 to 26 June 2008, he became deputy director general of Department of Higher Education (Upper Myanmar). He served as rector in Meiktila University from 27 June 2008 to 6 May 2014 and Mandalay University from 6 May 2014 to 31 July 2015. He retired from the education career in 2015 as the rector of Myanmar's second oldest university.

== Member of Pyithu Hluttaw ==
He was elected in the 2015 General Election from Meiktila Township. He competed in the election for Pyithu Hluttaw Deputy Speaker in March 2018. However, Tun Tun Hein became deputy speaker.
