= Lamaing, Ye =

Lamaing လၟိုၚ်
- Town
- Location in Burma
- Coordinates: 15°30′08″N 97°50′03″E
- Country: Myanmar
- State: Mon
- District: Mawlamyine District
- Township: Ye Township
- Elevation: 13 m (43 ft)

Population
  - Religions: Buddhism
- Time zone: UTC+6.30 (MMT)

Lamaing (Mon: လၟိုၚ်; Burmese: လမိုင်း) is a town in Mawlamyine District in the Mon State of south-east Myanmar. Lamaing is on the coastal plain about 6 kilometres (3.7 mi) east of Kawdut and 2 kilometres (1.2 mi) west of Mawkanin.

== Villages ==
- Mawkanin
- Thaung Pyin
- KuoungDoung
- Kaut Daught
