= Thanbyuzayat Township =

Coordinates: 15.9667°N 97.7333°E

Thanbyuzayat Township သံဖြူဇရပ်မြို့နယ်
- Township
- Location in Mawlamyine district
- Country: Myanmar
- State: Mon State
- District: Mawlamyine District
- Capital: Thanbyuzayat
- Time zone: UTC+6:30 (MST)

Thanbyuzayat Township (Burmese: သံဖြူဇရပ်မြို့နယ်, Mon: ပွိုၚ်ဍုၚ်ဇြပ်ဗု) is a township of Mawlamyine District in the Mon State of Myanmar. It is the site of a war cemetery and the Death Railway Museum, commemorating the prisoners of war and internees who died constructing the Burma-Siam Railway as slave labour during the Japanese occupation in World War II.
