= Abok, Malaysia =

Abok
- Location within Borneo
- Coordinates: 1.08333°N 111.01667°E
- Country: Malaysia
- State: Sarawak
- Elevation: 145 m (476 ft)

Abok is a settlement in Sarawak, Malaysia. It lies approximately 94.2 kilometres (58.5 mi) southeast of the state capital Kuching. Neighbouring settlements include:

- Apeng 3.7 kilometres (2.3 mi) east
- Isu 6.7 kilometres (4.2 mi) northeast
- Kampung Jaong 6.7 kilometres (4.2 mi) northwest
- Kampung Sabal Kruin 7.6 kilometres (4.7 mi) west
- Kampung Nyalitak 10 kilometres (6.2 mi) west
