= Buddhist and Pali University of Sri Lanka =

University in Homagama, Sri Lanka

- ශ්‍රී ලංකා බෞද්ධ හා පාලි විශ්වවිද්‍යාලය
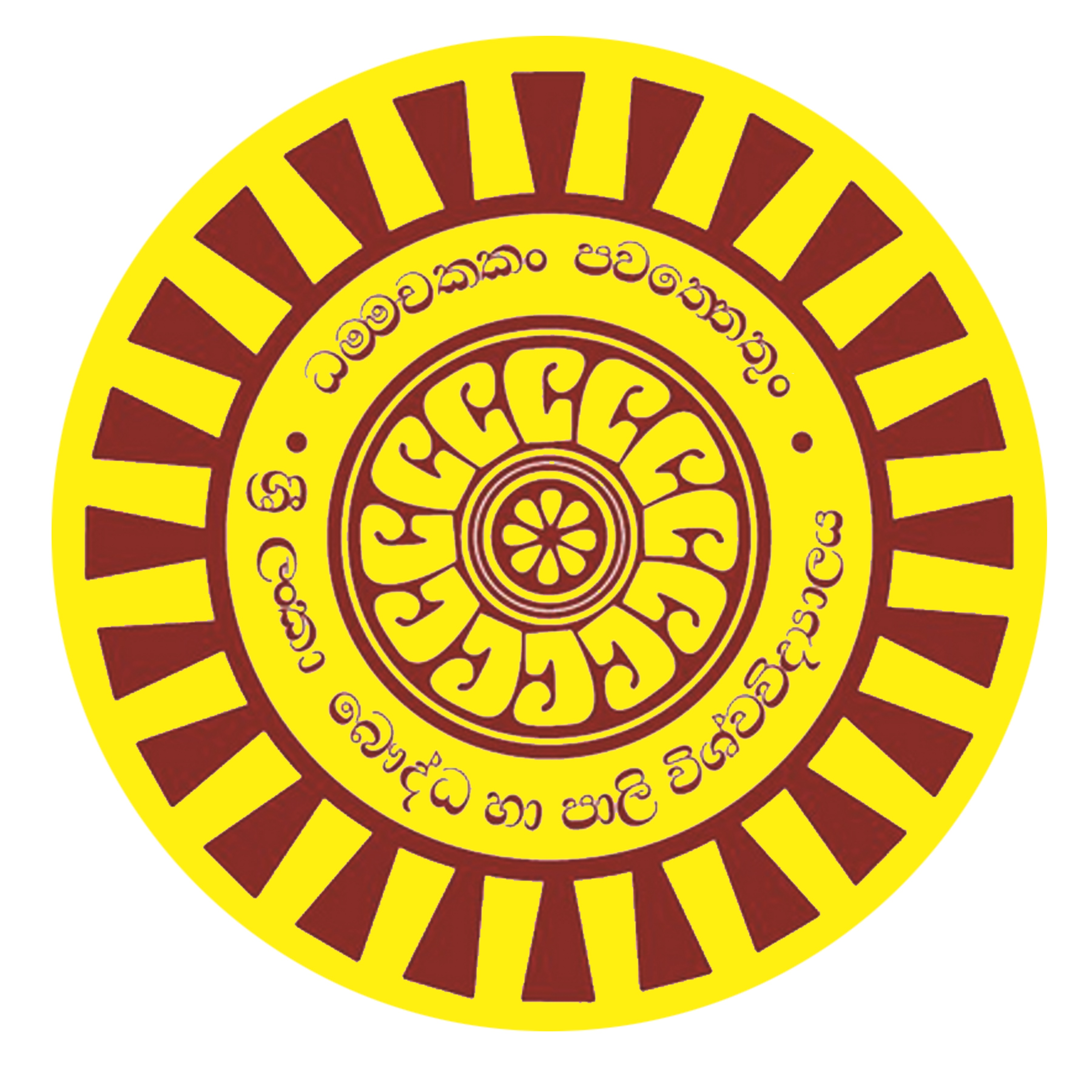
- Type: Public; Buddhist University
- Established: 1981; 45 years ago
- Affiliations: Association of Commonwealth Universities
- Chancellor: Ven. Warakagoda Gnanarathana, Mahanayake Thero Asgiriya Chapter
- Vice-Chancellor: Ven. Prof. Gallelle Sumanasiri Thero
- Dean: Ven. Prof. Wawwe Dhammarakkhitha Thero
- Administrative staff: 160 (41 Academics)
- Students: 600
- Undergraduates: 1050
- Postgraduates: 560
- Doctoral students: 30
- Location: Gurulugomi mawatha, Pitipana North, Homagama, Sri Lanka
- Website: www.bpu.ac.lk

The Buddhist and Pali University of Sri Lanka is a Buddhist university in Homagama, Sri Lanka. It was founded in 1981 and is organized in two faculties.

== Objectives ==
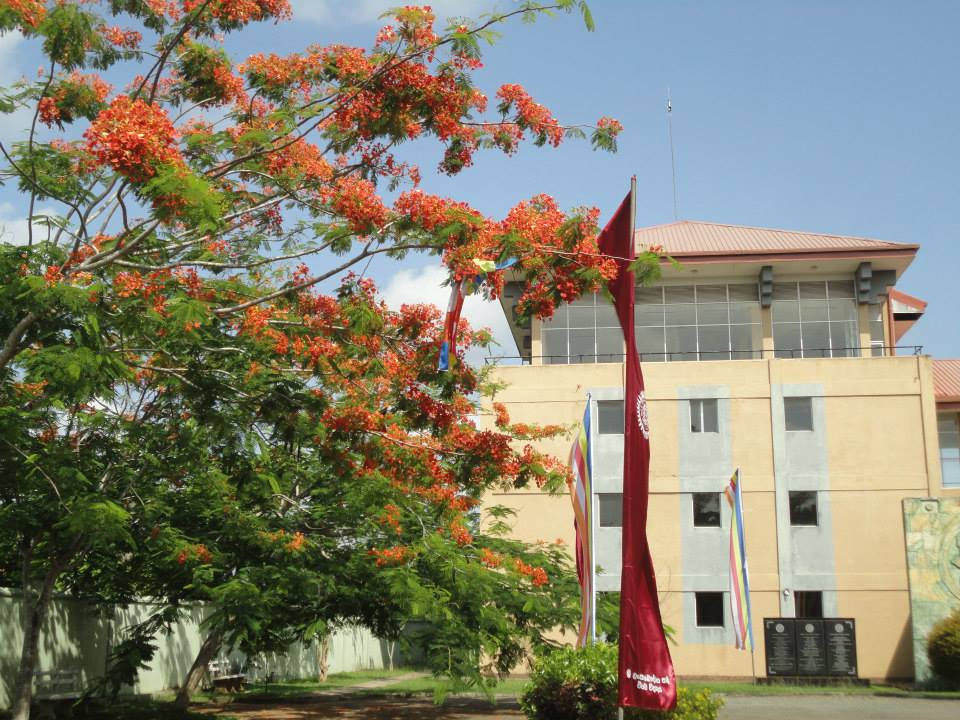
Library Building

The objectives that were fundamental to the establishment of the university are in the Buddhist and Pali University of Sri Lanka Act No. 74 of 1981, as amended by the Buddhist and Pali University of Sri Lanka Act No. 37 of 1995:

The training of savants in the Buddhist Doctrine and Discipline for the purpose of the dissemination of Buddhism and nurturing of Buddhist missionary activities in Sri Lanka and abroad.

The promotion of the study of the Pali Language, Buddhist Culture and Buddhist Philosophy in Sri Lanka and abroad, and the enhancement of those studies as befitting the modern world trends.
(a) The training of the student monks and the lay male students to teach Buddhism and Pali Language in the Pirivenas, Schools and in similar institutions.
(b) The provision of facilities to maintain and promote courtesy and civility and mental discipline among the student monks and the lay male students.
(c) Any other matter connected with or ancillary to the above objectives.

The objective of establishing this university is not merely offering degree programmes as it is done in any other national university. This is an institution that has been established to achieve the aims of disseminating Dhamma in Sri Lanka and throughout the world, to promote the study of Dhamma and Discipline (Vinaya), to provide facilities for monk students and lay students in pirivenas, schools and other such institutions, teaching pali language and it is also expected to assist the monk students.

The subject stream of this university is confined to Buddhist Philosophy, Buddhist Culture, Archaeology, Religious Studies and Comparative Philosophy, Pali, Sanskrit, English and Sinhala. Pali and Buddhist Philosophy or Buddhist Culture is compulsory.

The priority is given to Buddhist monks when selecting students as this is an institution established to uplift, especially, Pali Language studies and Buddhist Studies.

== History ==
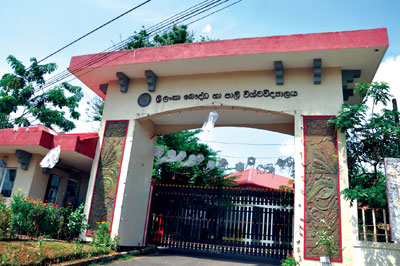
Main gate of the university

Established by the Act of Parliament No. 74 of 1981, the Buddhist and Pali University of Sri Lanka was officially inaugurated in 1982. Its primary objectives were to propagate Buddhism, advance Pali and Buddhist studies locally and internationally, and provide dedicated research facilities in these fields. Following the passage of Amendment Act No. 37 of 1995, the university underwent a major restructuring to align its administrative framework with Sri Lanka's general university system, rendering its former affiliated institution defunct.

It is a member of the Association of Commonwealth Universities and the International Association of Theravada Buddhist universities.

== Faculties ==
=== Faculty of Buddhist Studies ===
Dean, Faculty of Buddhist Studies, Ven. Senior Lecturer Beragama Saddhananda Thero.

Departments:

- Department of Buddhist Philosophy
- Department of Religious studies and Comparative Philosophy
- Department of Buddhist Culture
- Department of Archaeology

Units:

- Computer Teaching Unit (CTU)

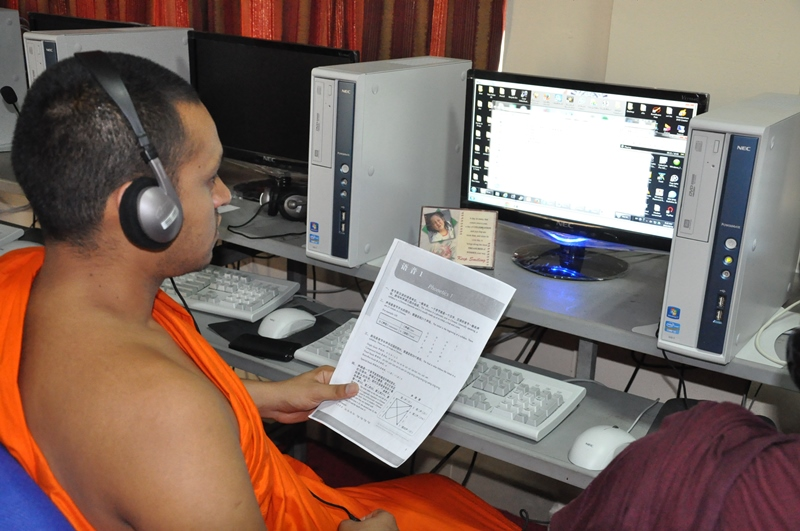
CTU

=== Faculty of Language Studies ===
Dean, Faculty of Language Studies, Associate Prof. Ven. Lenagala Siriniwasa Thero.

Departments:

- Department of Pali
- Department of Sinhala
- Department of Sanskrit
- Department of English
- Department of Language Skills Development
- Department of English Language Teaching

=== Admissions ===
- Bachelor of Arts General Degree (Internal)
- Bachelor of Arts Special Degree

=== Postgraduate and External examination Unit ===
Courses

- P.H.D.
- M.Phil.
- M.A
- P.G.D
- B.A.

Diploma

- Diploma in Buddhism/Pali/Sanskrit
- Diploma in Sanskrit
- Diploma in Japanese/Korean/French/Chinese/Hindi/Tamil/English
- Diploma in Buddhist Counseling

== Affiliated Institutions ==
- Singapore
- Malaysia
- South Korea
- Germany
- Austria
- Scotland
- England
- Buddhist & Pali Research Trust [R] (India)
- The Buddhist & Pali College (U.S.A.)

== Student life ==
Near 3000 students attend; others follow external degree programs conducted by the university.

== Notable alumni ==
- Ketumala, a Burmese nun

== Research and publications ==
- https://web.archive.org/web/20151109155345/http://www.bpu.ac.lk/publications/research

== See also ==
- List of Buddhist universities across the world
- Education in Sri Lanka
- Sri Lankan universities
- Buddhism in Sri Lanka
- Education in India
- Buddhism in India
