= Mawlamyine Township =

Coordinates: 16.4833°N 97.6167°E

Mawlamyine Township မော်လမြိုင်မြို့နယ်
- Township
- Location in Mawlamyine district
- Country: Myanmar
- State: Mon State
- District: Mawlamyine District
- Capital: Mawlamyine

Area
  - Total: 84.5 sq mi (218.8 km^{2})

Population (2014)
  - Total: 289,388
  - Density: 3,426/sq mi (1,323/km^{2})
- Time zone: UTC+6:30 (MST)

Mawlamyine Township (Burmese: မော်လမြိုင်မြို့နယ်) is a township of Mawlamyine District in the Mon State of Myanmar. The principal town is Mawlamyine.

== Demographics ==
=== 2014 ===
Historical Population
Year	Pop.	±%
1973		—
1983		—
2014	289,388	—

The 2014 Myanmar Census reported that Mawlamyine Township had a population of 289,388. The population density was 1,322.6 people per km^{2}. The census reported that the median age was 29.2 years, and 93 males per 100 females. There were 57,457 households; the mean household size was 4.7.

The Pa-Auk Forest Monastery is located in the village of Pa-Auk (Burmese: ဖားအောက်, MLCTS: Pha:auk).
