= Saiye, Ghana =

Human settlement in Ghana

Coordinates: 10°38′N 1°38′W

Saiye (also, Saive) is a settlement in Sissala East Municipal District, Upper West Region in northern Ghana.
