= Taungbon, Mon =

Taungbon
- Location in Burma
- Coordinates: 15°25′N 97°50′E
- Country: Burma
- State: Mon
- Township: Ye Township

Population (2005)
  - Ethnicities: Mon
  - Religions: Buddhism
- Time zone: UTC+6.30 (Myanmar Standard Time)

Taungbon (Burmese: တောင်ဘုံကျေးရွာ; Mon: ကွာန်တံင်မောံ) is a village in Ye Township in the Mon State of south-east Burma. It is located north-west of Ye city. Most of people are Mon people.
