= Duya, Myanmar =

Durae ဒူရာ
- Village
- Location in Burma
- Coordinates: 15°15′42″N 97°46′55″E
- Country: Burma (Myanmar)
- State: Mon State
- District: Mawlamyine District
- Township: Ye Township
- Elevation: 13 m (43 ft)

Population
  - Total: 30,000
  - Religions: Buddhism
- Time zone: UTC+6.30 (MST)

Duya (Burmese: ဒူးယား; Mon: ဒူရာ) is a village in Ye Township in Mawlamyine District in the Mon State of south-east Burma (Myanmar). It is located to the west of the Yegyaw Marshes (Yegyaw Chaung) and north of the Ye River, about 4 kilometres (2.5 mi) north-west of the town of Abaw.
