= Ye District =

Ye Township Ye District ပွိုင်ဍုင်ရေဝ် ရေးမြို့နယ် ရေးခရိုင်
- Township and District
- Location in Mon State
- Coordinates: 15°18′N 97°58′E
- Country: Myanmar
- State: Mon State
- District: Ye District
- Capital: Ye

Area
  - Total: 2,720.7 km^{2} (1,050.5 sq mi)

Population (2014)
  - Total: 263,624
  - Density: 96.896/km^{2} (250.96/sq mi)
- Time zone: UTC+6:30 (MMT)

Ye Township (Burmese: ရေးမြို့နယ်; Mon: ပွိုၚ်ဍုၚ်ရေဝ်) is the only township of Ye District (Burmese: ရေးခရိုင်) in the Mon State, Myanmar. The Ye District was formed in April 2022 by splitting the singular Ye Township from the rest of former Mawlamyine District. Its principal town is Ye.

== Towns and villages ==
- Abaw
- Akan
- Andin
- Awaing
- Awainggale
- Asin
- Dabataw
- Daminzeik Auk
- Daminzeikkyi
- Duya
- Hmeinsein
- Hnyihnu
- Koh Doot
- Khawsa
- Kin
- Kyonpaw
- Lamaing
- Mawkanin
- Saiye
- Sakale
- Sonmatha
- Taungbon
- Thaung Pyin
- Thinbawzeik
- Thingangyun
- Waipathe
- Zayat
- Zuntalin
