= Mawlamyine District =

District of the Mon State in Myanmar

Coordinates: 15°46′N 97°51′E

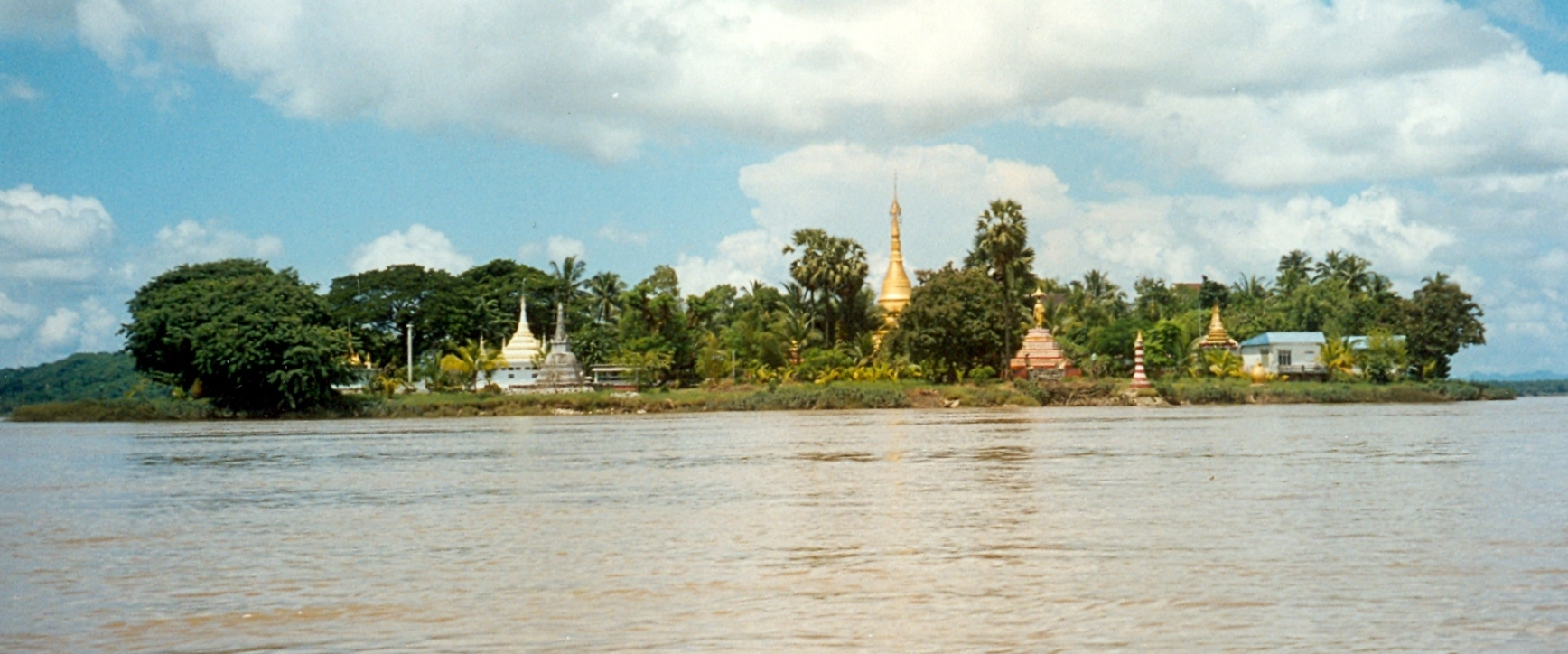
Mawlamyine town

Mawlamyine District (Burmese: မော်လမြိုင်ခရိုင်) is a(Mon language :ခရီုမတ်မလီု) district of the Mon State in Myanmar (Burma). The capital is Mawlamyine town. The district covers an area of 6,084 km^{2}, and had a population of 1,232,221 at the 2014 Census.

location in Mon state (in red)

== Townships ==
The district contains the following townships:

- Mawlamyine Township
- Kyaikmaraw Township
- Chaungzon Township
- Thanbyuzayat Township
- Mudon Township

Prior to 2022, the district also included Ye Township. On 30 April 2022, Ye was upgraded to form the new Ye District by itself.
