= Ye, Myanmar =

Ye ရေး ရေဝ်
- Town
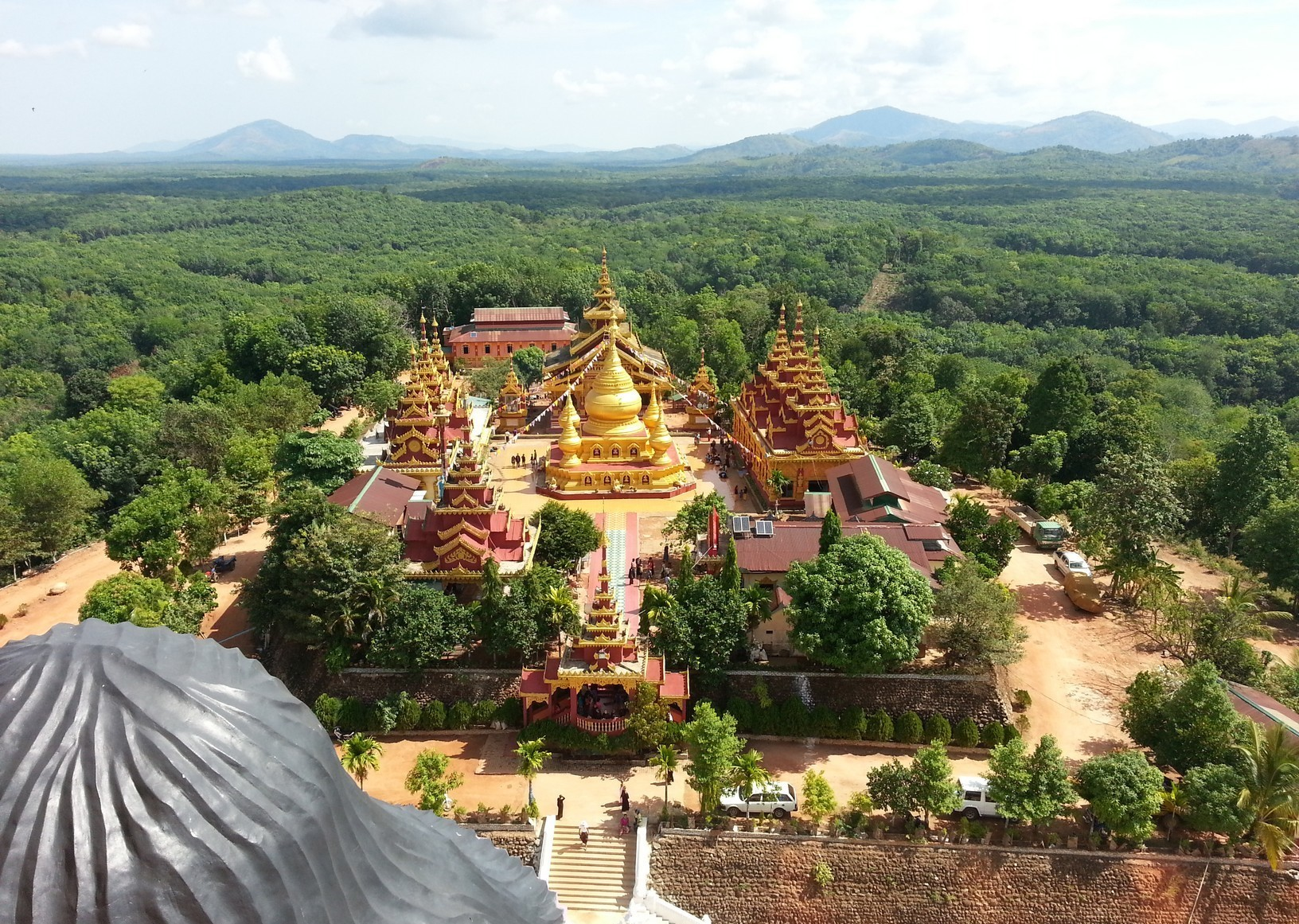
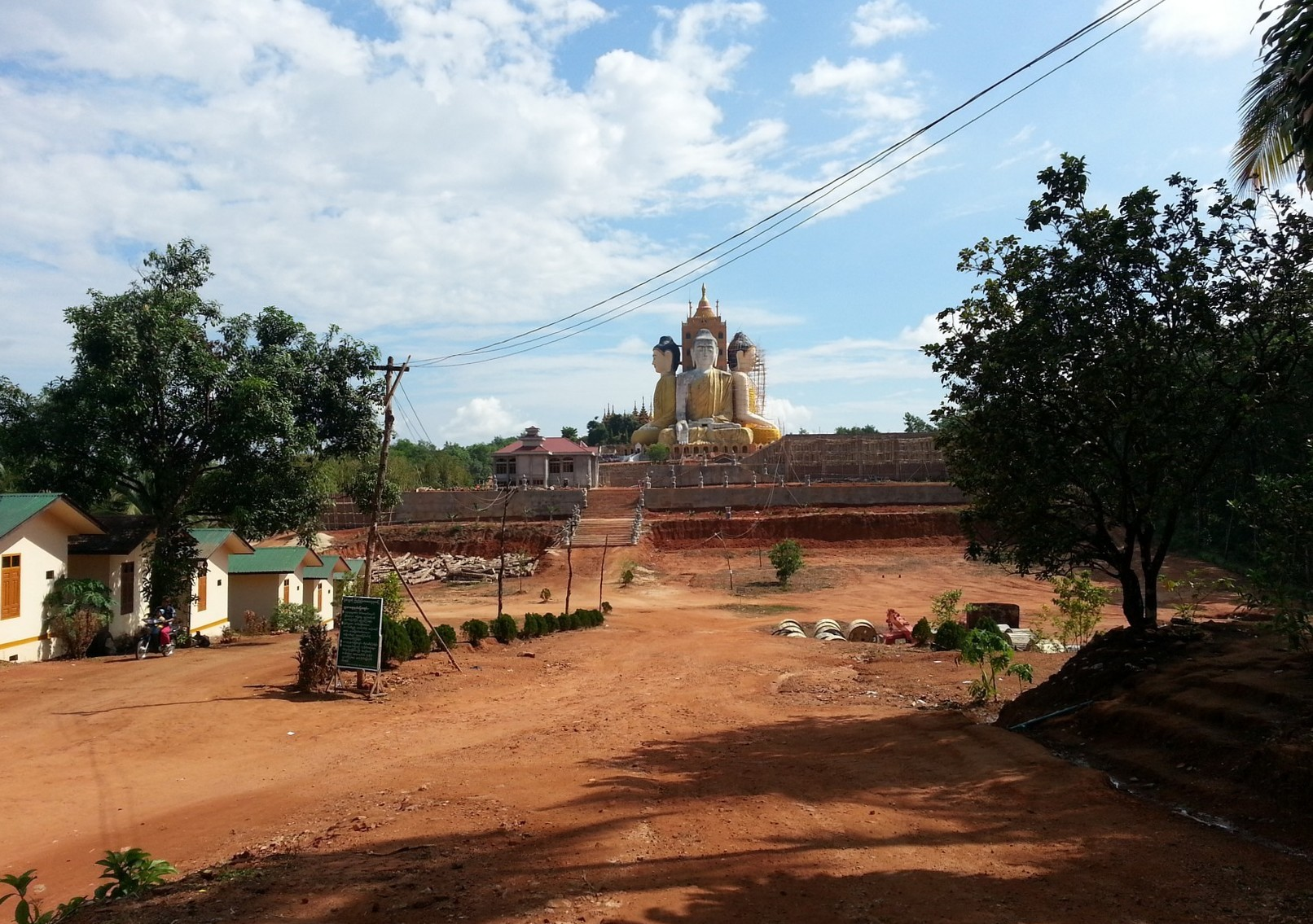

- Location of Ye, Mon, Myanmar (Burma)
- Coordinates: 15°14′48″N 97°51′20″E
- Country: Myanmar
- Division: Mon State
- District: Ye District
- Township: Ye Township

Population (2014)
  - Total: 34,430
  - Ethnicities: Mon
  - Religions: Buddhism
- Time zone: UTC+6.30 (MMT)

Ye (Burmese: ရေးမြို့, IPA: [jé mjo̰] , Mon: ဍုၚ်ရေဝ်) is a town in the southern end of Mon State, Myanmar (Burma). It is the principal town of Ye District and Ye Township. The town is located by the Ye River as it drains into the Gulf of Martaban, and is surrounded by Tenasserim Hills in the east. It has warm, moderate weather. The town's economy is mainly based on betel nut, rubber, fishery production, and trade. Ye is on the Mawlamyaing-Dawei rail line, and has a seaport. The majority of the people are ethnic Mon people. Ye is a center of Mon language education. As of 2014, it had a population of 34,430.

There was a flood in August 2011 after a torrent of rain (12.6 inches on 1 August). 2,000 houses were flooded and some schools and markets were closed because of it.

== Climate ==
Ye has a tropical monsoon climate (Köppen climate classification Am). Temperatures are hot throughout the year, although maximum temperatures in the monsoon months are depressed by heavy cloud and rain. There is a winter dry season (November–April) and a summer wet season (May–October). Torrential rain falls from June to September, with over 1,200 millimetres (47 in) falling in August alone.

Climate data for Ye (1991–2020)
Month	Jan	Feb	Mar	Apr	May	Jun	Jul	Aug	Sep	Oct	Nov	Dec	Year
Mean daily maximum °C (°F)	33.5 (92.3)	34.8 (94.6)	35.6 (96.1)	35.9 (96.6)	33.0 (91.4)	30.4 (86.7)	29.5 (85.1)	29.1 (84.4)	30.4 (86.7)	32.6 (90.7)	33.6 (92.5)	33.1 (91.6)	32.6 (90.7)
Daily mean °C (°F)	25.6 (78.1)	26.4 (79.5)	27.9 (82.2)	29.3 (84.7)	28.2 (82.8)	26.8 (80.2)	26.1 (79.0)	25.9 (78.6)	26.5 (79.7)	27.5 (81.5)	27.3 (81.1)	26.0 (78.8)	27.0 (80.6)
Mean daily minimum °C (°F)	17.7 (63.9)	18.0 (64.4)	20.2 (68.4)	22.7 (72.9)	23.4 (74.1)	23.1 (73.6)	22.7 (72.9)	22.7 (72.9)	22.7 (72.9)	22.5 (72.5)	21.0 (69.8)	18.8 (65.8)	20.1 (68.2)
Average precipitation mm (inches)	10.2 (0.40)	5.7 (0.22)	30.3 (1.19)	83.1 (3.27)	517.0 (20.35)	1,061.1 (41.78)	1,320.2 (51.98)	1,367.6 (53.84)	813.5 (32.03)	243.4 (9.58)	59.7 (2.35)	6.4 (0.25)	5,518.1 (217.25)
Average precipitation days (≥ 1.0 mm)	0.8	0.4	1.9	4.5	18.0	25.6	27.8	27.6	23.0	14.6	3.8	0.8	148.9
Source: World Meteorological Organization

== Gallery ==
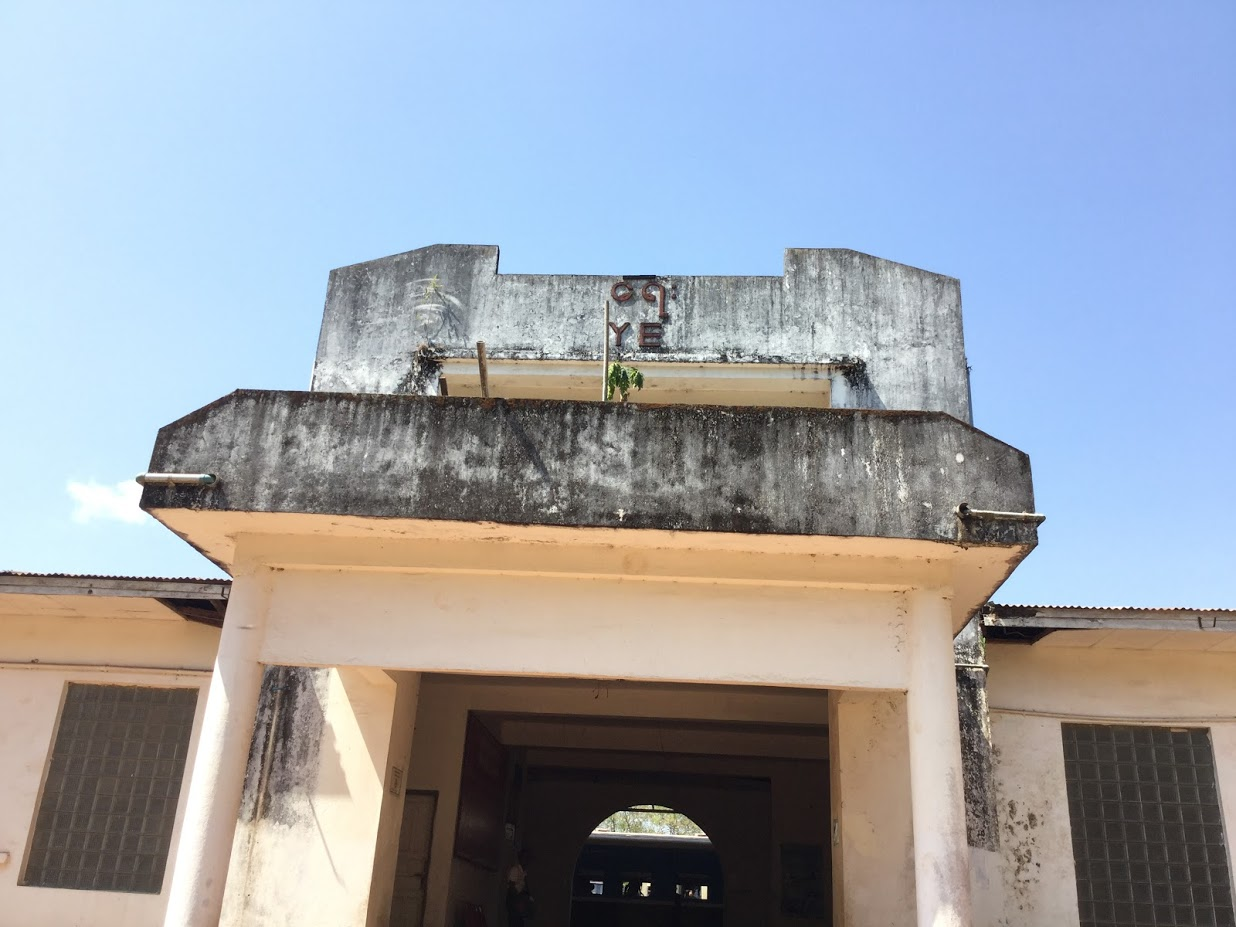
Ye Station

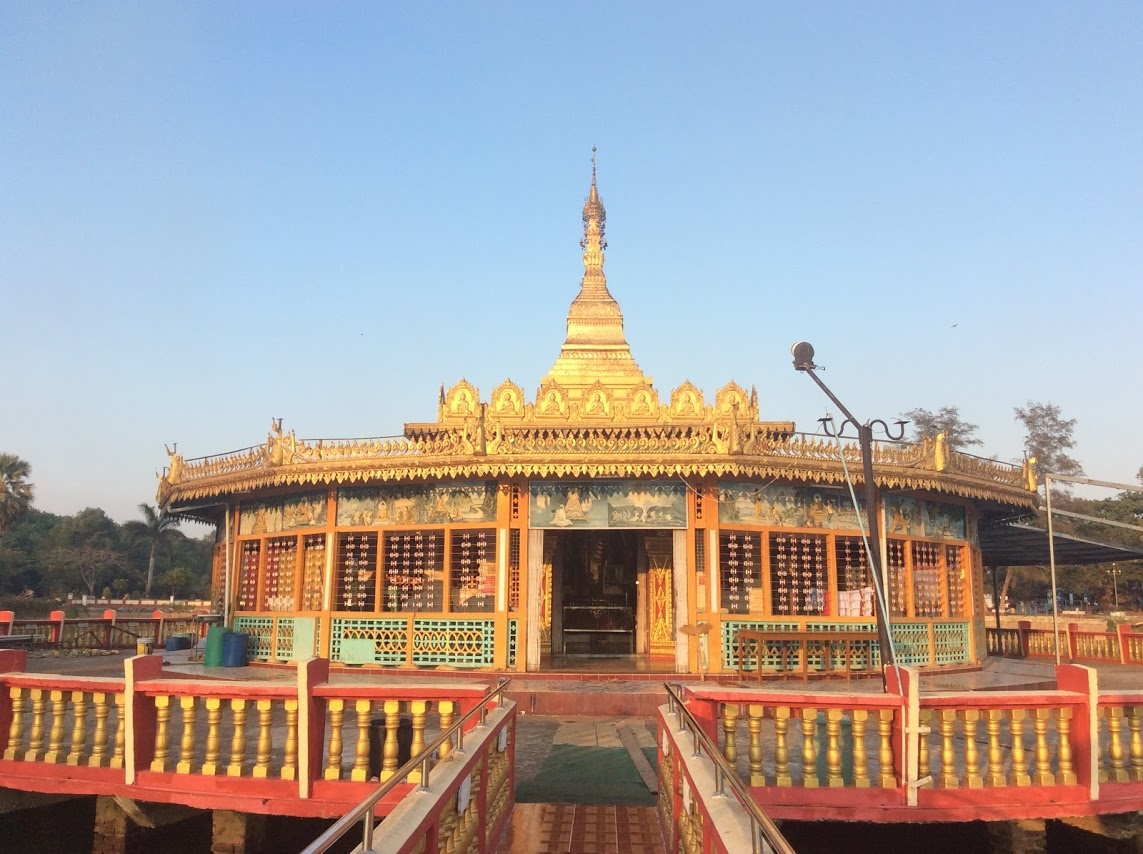
Sasana 2500 Pagoda

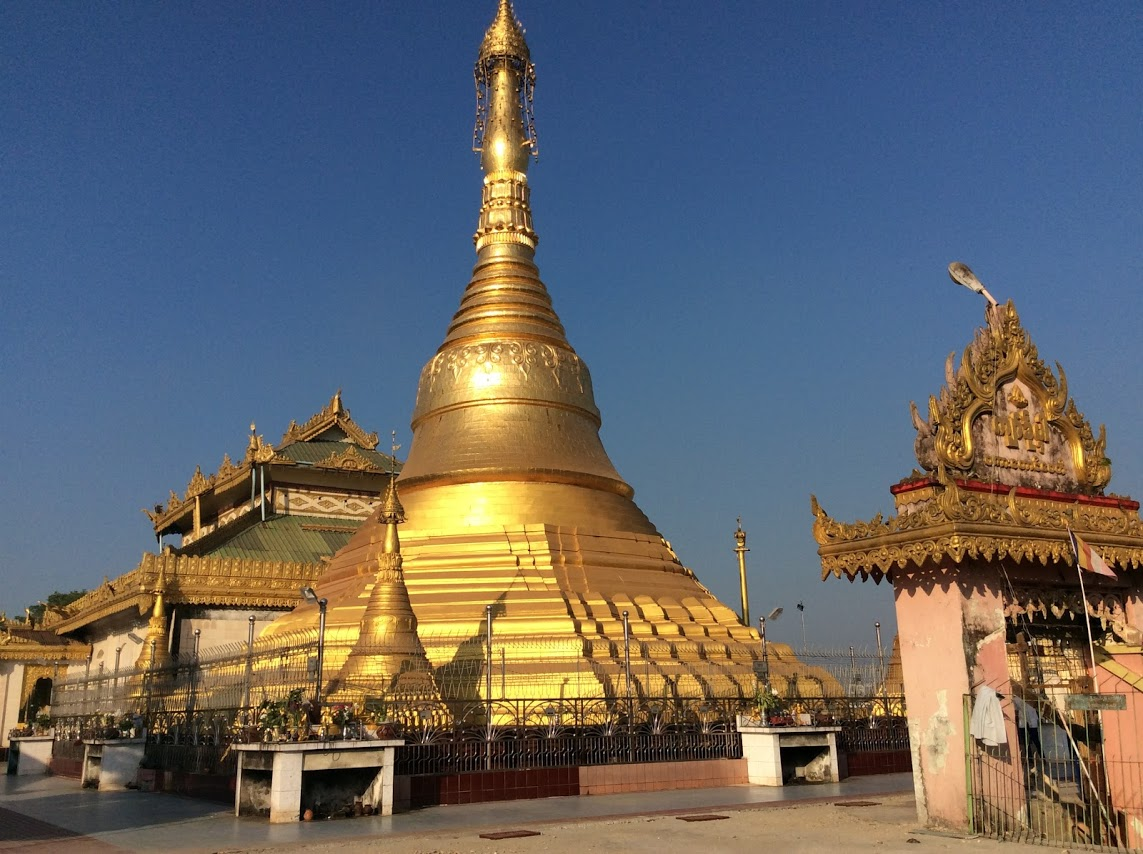
Sakar Taung Pagoda
