= Sein Dway =

Burmese boxer and champion

- Sein Dway in 1932
- Native name: စိန်ဒွေး
- Nationality: Burmese
- Weight: 57 kg (126 lb; 9.0 st)
- Division: Featherweight
- Style: Lethwei
- Rank: Second class
- Years active: 1920's-1930's

Sein Dway (Burmese: စိန်ဒွေး) was a Burmese boxer in British Burma. He was a former second class champion and owner of U Ba's cup in 1931.

== Lethwei career ==
After winning the cup in second class in 1931, he re-entered the tournament the following year. It was once again organized by Minister of Home Affairs U Ba and administered by U Thein Maung (Ohn Khaing) and U Tun Yin. The line-up for this year included Sein Dway, Chit Phyu, Aye Wan, Kyin Yone, Sein Ba, Hla Hmway, Pauk Kyaw, Kyar Kalay, Sein Nu, Yar Kyar, and Kyaw Nu.

Before the tournament started he faced Moe Hmyaw who was actually from third class and a little younger. Because of his size he was able to keep up with Sein Dway. Most of the fight was spent in the clinch, wrestling. In the last two rounds Sein Dway got some scouring punches in that made Moe Hmyaw's face swell up. Neither got knocked down in the fight, and it ended as a draw.

In the quarter-final match of the 1932 tournament, Sein Dway faced Pauk Kyaw. He tried closing the distance and wrestle again but he was denied every time. When Pauk Kyaw came charging in he miscalculated his move and got hit in the face after which he collapsed. Sein Dway's jabs kept hitting their target, swelling and bruising Pauk Kyaw's face. After four rounds Pauk Kyaw admitted defeat, allowing Sein Dway to continue to the next round. The semi-finals were between Sein Dway and Chit Phyu, and Yar Kyaw and Aye Wan. Sein Dway faced the eventual champion and unfortunately was stopped in his tracks to reach the final.

On January 26, 1933, newspaper The Sun reported on the festivities at King Carnival Stadium in Rangoon. Sein Dway was participating in the event along Dalhousie Street and fought Aye Wan to a draw. It furthermore mentions that the 1932 flag champion in second class faced a much stronger opponent in Aye Wan, but that Sein Dway's tenchnique was far better.

In celebration of King George's 25 years of reign, a grand festival and boxing tournament was held in Rangoon at Kandawgyi Lake in May 1935. Winners of the tournament could win a gold medal. The tournament featured a league point system, where boxers were awarded points depending on the outcome of their matches. Newspaper Light of Burma reports in the May 2nd edition that Sein Dway will face off against Ba Sein. The feature is topped by a photograph showing Sein Dway posing together with Pauk Kyaw.

== Titles and accomplishments ==
- Championships
  - Chief Justice U Ba's Championship winner (Second class, 1931)
- Other accomplishments
  - First place flag winner in second class (1932)

== Lethwei record ==
Professional Lethwei record (Incomplete)
8 fights, 3 win (3 (T)KOs), 1 loss, 3 draws
Date	Result	Opponent	Event	Location	Method	Round	Time
1935-05-03		(British Raj) Ba Sein	25th Ann. King George's accession, Kandawgyi Lake	Rangoon, Burma			
1933-01-25	Draw	(British Raj) Aye Wan	King Carnival Stadium	Rangoon, Burma	Draw		
1932-12-31	Loss	(British Raj) Chit Phyu	U Ba's Championship semi-final, Hare Krishna Pilay Hall	Rangoon, Burma			
1932-12-27	Win	(British Raj) Pauk Kyaw	U Ba's Championship quarter-final, Hare Krishna Pilay Hall	Rangoon, Burma	TKO	4	
1932-12-25	Draw	(British Raj) Moe Hmyaw	Hare Krishna Pilay Hall	Rangoon, Burma	Draw	4	
1931-12-24	Win	(British Raj) Aye Khin	Sandwith x York Rd. Fairgrounds	Rangoon, Burma	TKO (hand injury)		
1931-12-20	Draw	(British Raj) Sein Bu	Sandwith x York Rd. Fairgrounds	Rangoon, Burma	Draw	3	
1931-12-19	Win	(British Raj) Paung Phyu	Sandwith x York Rd. Fairgrounds	Rangoon, Burma	TKO		
