= Bala Sein =

Burmese boxer and champion

- Bala Sein in 1932
- Native name: ဗလစိန်
- Nationality: Burmese
- Weight: 64 kg (141 lb; 10.1 st)
- Division: Lightweight
- Style: Lethwei
- Rank: First class
- Years active: 1920's-1930's

Other information
- Children: Daw Htwar Phyu (daughter)
- Notable relatives: Saw Aung Myint Sein (grandson)

Bala Sein (Burmese: ဗလစိန်) was a well-known Burmese boxer in British Burma. He was a former champion and owner of U Ba's cup in 1932.

== Lethwei career ==
In 1927 Bala Sein entered a three day tournament which was held from November 6 to November 8 at Kandawgyi Lake in Rangoon, on the occasion of Governor Sir Spencer Harcourt Butler's farewell festivities. He was first seed out of some 50 other boxers. The champion in first class received a gold medal from Minister of Home Affairs J.A. Maung Gyi. The consolation prize for second class was a cup awarded by Lance Corporal Lim Kar Taik, son of Sino-Burmese entrepreneur Lim Chin Tsong.

In 1932 he entered a tournament organized by Minister of Home Affairs U Ba and administered by U Thein Maung (Ohn Khaing) and U Tun Yin. Together with Phyu Lay Gyi, Kyar Aye Sein, Paw Sa, Pyi Taw Pyan, Yin Lone, Doe Phyu Kalay and Phyu Lay Pyan, he battled to win U Ba's cup which was previously won by Pyi Taw Pyan in 1931. The absence of Kular Pyan (Mawlamyine), contender for the cup in 1931, was due to a fractured hand. Bala Sein ended up winning the tournament and was awarded the cup and medal by U Ba himself.

Before the tournament commenced, Bala Sein fought Paw Sa in a challenge match on December 24. He hurt Paw Sa in the first round with a knee in the clinch, but the remaining rounds did not produce a winner and thus they were tied.

In the tournament quarter-final Bala Sein was initially supposed to fight Kyar Aye Sein. But since Pyi Taw Pyan had challenged him the day before, his opponent was changed to Yin Lone. He would eventually face Kyar Aye Sein later on in the semi-final of the tournament. There was an apparent difference in age when Bala Sein and Yin Lone met in the ring, since Yin Lone is older and had been boxing for far longer. The older boxer was hesitant to exchange with the younger Bala Sein. In round two however Yin Lone started throwing up and could no longer continue the match comfortably.

Newspaper The Sun reported on January 26, 1933 that Bala Sein was participating in an event at King Carnival Stadium along Dalhousie Street.

During a 1933 boxing tournament for 52 Army, Navy and Police forces, Bala Sein and Phyu Lay (Gyi) featured in a Burmese boxing match. Winners in their respective ranks won a Maha Bandula engraved trophy, awarded by Governor Sir Hugh Landsdowne Stephenson. Phyu Lay ended up winning by TKO because of a cut on Bala Sein's face.

== Personal life ==
Saw Aung Myint Sein, a boxer in the 70's and 80's and son of Daw Htwar Phyu and U Kyaw Yin, lists Bala Sein as his maternal grandfather.

U Bo Kay, father of the late boxer Yangon Aung Din, was a contemporary of Bala Sein and once challenger to Phyu Gyi, father of Shwe War Tun.

== Titles and accomplishments ==
- Championships
  - Minister of Home Affairs U Ba's Championship winner (1932)

== Lethwei record ==
Professional Lethwei record (Incomplete)
5 fights, 3 wins (3 (T)KOs), 1 losses, 1 draw
Date	Result	Opponent	Event	Location	Method	Round	Time
1933-01-21	Loss	(British Raj) Phyu Lay Gyi (Hnit Char)	Army/Navy/Police boxing tournament, Jubilee Hall	Rangoon, Burma	TKO		
1933-01-01	Win	(British Raj) Phyu Lay Gyi (Hnit Char)	U Ba's Championship final, Jubilee Hall	Rangoon, Burma	KO		
1932-12-31	Win	(British Raj) Kyar Aye Sein (Pegu)	U Ba's Championship semi-final, Hare Krishna Pilay Hall	Rangoon, Burma	KO		
1932-12-28	Win	(British Raj) Yin Lone	U Ba's Championship quarter-final, Hare Krishna Pilay Hall	Rangoon, Burma	TKO	2	
1932-12-24	Draw	(British Raj) Paw Sa	Challenge fight, Hare Krishna Pilay Hall	Rangoon, Burma	Draw	4	
