= Tway Ma Shaung =

Burmese boxer and golden belt champion

- Born: Yan Naing Lin; September 15, 1982 (age 43); Taw Ku village, Mudon Township, Mon State, Burma
- Native name: ရန်နိုင်လင်း
- Other names: Palaw Yan Naing (ပုလောရန်နိုင်); Knockout King (အလဲထိုးဘုရင်)
- Nationality: (Myanmar) Burmese
- Height: 168 cm (5 ft 6 in)
- Weight: 63 kg (139 lb; 9.9 st)
- Division: Lightweight; Light welterweight
- Style: Lethwei
- Stance: Orthodox
- Fighting out of: Palaw Township (1996-2005); Yangon (2006-2013)
- Team: KLN/T&T; Nagar Mann
- Teachers: U Myint Lwin; U Dee (Mon State)
- Trainer: U Myint Wai; Win Zin Oo; Soe Than Win; Kyaw Soe
- Rank: First class
- Years active: 1996-2013

Other information
- Occupation: Retired
- Spouse: Daw Khin Thaw Thaw Thein (m. 2011)
- Children: Sit Naing Thu; Sit Yan Naing
- Notable club: Phoenix Lethwei Gym (2016-2017)

Tway Ma Shaung (Burmese: တွေ့မရှောင်, MLCTS: twei ma.shaun) (born December 9, 1982) is a retired Burmese lethwei fighter considered by many to be the best of his generation and a legend in the sport, his fighting style characterised by his resilience and virtuosity. He was revered for taking on larger and heavier opponents and praised for his commitment to working the body instead of the head.

== Biography ==
Tway Ma Shaung was born in Mon State, but his family moved to Tanintharyi Region when he was two years old. He is the son of U Mya Thaung and Daw Nyo Nyo Khin and has one older brother and two younger sisters. His first fight was in 1996 while in 8th standard and his second fight was during a school holiday in Myeik Township at an event hosted by his future trainer U Myint Wai. He left school after 9th standard.

== Lethwei career ==
The real start of Tway Ma Shaung's career was during the 1999/2000 season in Mon State where he was taught by local legend U Dee, the grandfather of Shwe Yar Mann. During his stay there he won six fights and drew in the other four. After an invitation by coach U Myint Wai to partake in the State and Division tournament in 2002 and subsequently winning the gold medal in his weightclass, Myint Wai gave him the nickname Tway Ma Shaung (loosely translating to "not avoiding anyone in sight").

Tway Ma Shaung's only loss on TKO happened in early 2005 when he faced Kyal Lin Aung. In round 5 Kyal Lin Aung scored a knockdown and although Tway Ma Shaung got up in time, he was too tired to continue and decided to turn his back and hand over the victory. In all their meetings Tway never got to avenge the loss since they were all draws.

Another well-known career spanning rivalry is the one with Win Tun, a fighter as skilled as Tway himself relying more on offense from the outside. By the time they met, Win Tun had already achieved to become a triple Golden Belt Champion and single Challenge Fight belt holder. Tway was able to best him in most of their meetings but both the beauty and level of violence these two brought to the ring was the primary selling point for most visitors, regardless of outcome.

In a rare instance of Burmese boxers going oversees, Tway got to fight in Austria in 2008. For the occasion he camped at his opponents residence. The fight was unfortunately overshadowed by the horrific events that unfolded back in his home country as cyclone Nargis had made landfall the day before the fight, claiming over 138.000 fatalities.

Closing out his career he attempted to attain the highest possible achievement in lethwei by fighting the national champion Saw Nga Man, a good 15kg heavier, who was the title-holder since 2009. Despite high expectations by the fans the fight ended up as a draw. Tway had to take a defensive stance against the powerful champion and was not able to inflict enough damage to take home the win.

== Retirement ==
In 2010, a culmination of events nearly led him to retire when his sister married, his house was burglarized and his father died.

In 2014, when Tway Ma Shaung retired many theories floated around as to what the real reason was for his withdrawal from competition. Injuries, dissatisfaction and a big falling out with his long-time trainer Kyaw Soe have all been named. He even turned down a fight with newcomer Tun Tun Min for a record purse at the time. In an interview a year after his retirement he said he had chosen family life at the request of his wife, because he always kept that itch to get back into the ring, persistent rumors often appear of Tway Ma Shaung returning. In 2018, The Daily Eleven falsely reported his return to the ring, as did various outlets after he appeared on a press conference prior to WLC 6: Heartless Tigers.

== Personal life ==
Tway Ma Shaung met his wife back in Dawei where she taught the child of the home-owner he was staying at. They got married in 2011 and have two children, Sit Naing Thu and Sit Yan Naing. His favorite fighter is Wan Chai, closely followed by his former opponent Win Tun.

== Titles and accomplishments ==
- Championships
  - 2007 Golden Belt Champion (60kg)
  - 2009 Dagon Shwe Aung Lan winner (1st class)
  - 2013 Dagon Shwe Aung Lan winner (1st class)
- Other championships and awards
  - 2002 State and Division gold medalist
  - 2007 Golden Belt Championship best boxer award
  - 2007 Southeast Asian Games bronze medal (Muay)
  - 2008 Challenge fight belt (vs. Thepsamut Wan Chorenrit)
  - 2009 Challenge fight belt (vs. Takashige “Crazy Hill” Hirukawa)
  - 2020 Legend of the Year award (WLC)

== Lethwei record ==
Professional Lethwei record
82 fights, 46 wins (46 (T)KOs), 2 losses, 34 draws
| Date | Result | Opponent | Event | Location | Method | Round | Time |
| 2013-03-28 | Draw | (Myanmar) Kyal Lin Aung | Lethwei Challenge Fights, Kyaik Kelasa | Lamaing, Ye, Mon State, Myanmar | Draw | 5 | 3:00 |
| 2013-03-01 | Draw | (Myanmar) Soe Lin Oo | Lethwei Challenge Fights, Kyaik Kelasa | Lamaing, Ye, Mon State, Myanmar | Draw | 5 | 3:00 |
| 2013-02-17 | Draw | (Myanmar) Saw Nga Man | National Championship Challenge, Thein Phyu Stadium | Yangon, Myanmar | Draw | 5 | 3:00 |
For the Openweight Lethwei Golden Belt
| 2013-02-05 | Win | (Thailand) Petchtae Jaipetchkorsang | Win Sein Taw Ya 2013 | Mudon Township, Mon State, Myanmar | KO | 4 | |
| 2013-01-20 | Win | (Thailand) Joviha | Myanmar vs. Thailand Challenge Fights | Yangon, Myanmar | KO | 1 | |
| 2013-01-06 | Win | (Myanmar) Phoe Kay | 2013 Dagon Shwe Aung Lan Final | Yangon, Myanmar | KO | 1 | 2:20 |
Wins 2013 Dagon Shwe Aung Lan, first class flag/trophy
| 2012-12-18 | Win | (Iran) Masood Izadi | 2013 Dagon Shwe Aung Lan Semi-final | Yangon, Myanmar | KO | 2 | 1:45 |
| 2012-10-25 | Win | (Myanmar) Thutti Aung | Kandawgyi Lake, Myaw Sin Island | Yangon, Myanmar | KO | 2 | |
| 2012-10-07 | Win | (Philippines) Mike Tumbaga | International Challenge Fights, Thein Phyu Stadium | Yangon, Myanmar | KO | 2 | 0:54 |
| 2012-09-16 | Win | (Myanmar) Tun Tun | Mandalay Rumbling Intl. Challenge Fights | Yangon, Myanmar | KO | 2 | |
Bout was originally scheduled to be against Umar Semata
| 2012-08-12 | Draw | (Myanmar) Soe Lin Oo | Lethwei Challenge Fights, Thein Phyu Stadium | Yangon, Myanmar | Draw | 5 | 3:00 |
| 2012-04-07 | Win | (Myanmar) Phoe Kay | Mandalay Rumbling Challenge Fights | Yangon, Myanmar | KO | 3 | 2:30 |
| 2012-03-00 | Win | (Myanmar) Mya Nan Taw | Lethwei Challenge Fights | Lamaing, Ye, Mon State, Myanmar | TKO (injury) | 3 | |
| 2012-02-24 | Draw | (Myanmar) Kyal Lin Aung | Lethwei Challenge Fights | Mandalay, Myanmar | Draw | 5 | 3:00 |
| 2012-01-00 | Draw | (Myanmar) Soe Lin Oo | Challenge Fights, Hnit Kayin village | Yangon, Myanmar | Draw | 5 | 3:00 |
| 2011-11-06 | Win | (Australia) Brian Harris | Myanmar vs. Australia Challenge Fights, Thein Phyu Stadium | Yangon, Myanmar | KO | 2 | 2:11 |
| 2010-12-31 | Draw | (Myanmar) Yan Naing Aung | Lethwei Challenge Fights, Thuwunna National Indoor Stadium (1) | Yangon, Myanmar | Draw | 5 | 3:00 |
| 2010-12-19 | Draw | (Myanmar) Kyal Lin Aung | Lethwei Challenge Fights | Dawei Township, Tanintharyi Region, Myanmar | Draw | 5 | 3:00 |
| 2010-11-21 | Win | (Myanmar) Yan Naing Aung | Lethwei Challenge Fights, Pa Nga village | Thanbyuzayat Township, Myanmar | KO | | |
| 2010-07-25 | Draw | (Myanmar) Win Tun | Lethwei Challenge Fights, Thuwunna National Indoor Stadium (1) | Yangon, Myanmar | Draw | 5 | 3:00 |
| 2010-00-00 | Draw | (Myanmar) Mya Nan Taw | Challenge Fights, Aung Myay Mantalar Sports Complex | Mandalay, Myanmar | Draw | 5 | 3:00 |
| 2010-02-17 | Draw | (Myanmar) Win Tun | Challenge Fights, Watho village | Thanbyuzayat Township, Myanmar | Draw | 5 | 3:00 |
| 2010-01-01 | Draw | (Myanmar) Phoe Kay | Challenge Fights, Hnit Kayin village | Yangon, Myanmar | Draw | 5 | 3:00 |
| 2009-12-12 | Loss | (Myanmar) Phoe Kay | 2010 Dagon Shwe Aung Lan Quarter-final | Yangon, Myanmar | Decision | 5 | 3:00 |
| 2009-10-24 | Draw | (Thailand) Thepsamut Wan Chorenrit | Myanmar-Thai Challenge Fights | Yangon, Myanmar | Draw | 5 | 3:00 |
| 2009-10-04 | Win | (Myanmar) Aung Zeya | Lethwei Challenge Fights, Myeik city (Day 2) | Myeik Township, Tanintharyi Region, Myanmar | KO | 3 | |
| 2009-09-05 | Draw | (Myanmar) Zan Htoo | 2009 Golden Belt Championship | Yangon, Myanmar | Draw | 5 | 3:00 |
| 2009-04-04 | Win | (Japan) Takashige Hirukawa | Myanmar-Japan Goodwill Letwhay Competition | Yangon, Myanmar | KO | 2 | |
Wins Myanmar vs. Japan Challenge Fight belt
| 2009-04-04 | Win | (Myanmar) Saw Ga Pa Re Hmu | 2009 Dagon Shwe Aung Lan Final | Yangon, Myanmar | KO | 2 | |
Wins 2009 Dagon Shwe Aung Lan, first class flag/trophy
| 2009-03-01 | Win | (Myanmar) Win Tun | 2009 Dagon Shwe Aung Lan Semi-final | Yangon, Myanmar | KO | 3 | 1:24 |
| 2009-02-00 | Win | (Myanmar) Zan Htoo | Challenge Fights, Sa Khan Gyi | Thanbyuzayat Township, Mon State, Myanmar | KO | 5 | |
| 2009-01-31 | Win | (Myanmar) Yan Gyi Aung | Calsome Challenge Fight-2 | Yangon, Myanmar | KO | 5 | |
| 2008-12-21 | Win | (Thailand) Phichitchai | Democratic Karen Buddhist Army 14th Anniversary | Myaing Gyi Ngu, Hpa-an Township, Kayin State, Myanmar | KO | 3 | |
| 2008-11-08 | Win | (Thailand) Thepsamut Wan Chorenrit | Myanmar-Thai International Letwhay Challenge Fight | Yangon, Myanmar | KO | 2 | 2:15 |
Wins Myanmar vs. Thailand Challenge Fight belt
| 2008-00-00 | Win | (Myanmar) Daung Nyo Lay | Lethwei Challenge Fights | Kachin State, Myanmar | KO | 2 | |
| 2008-09-27 | Win | (Myanmar) Thuya Ye Aung | Calsome Challenge Fight-1 (Day 1) | Yangon, Myanmar | KO | 3 | |
| 2008-08-09 | Win | (Myanmar) Aung Zeya | Lethwei Challenge Fights, Thuwunna National Indoor Stadium (1) | Yangon, Myanmar | KO | 3 | |
| 2008-06-11 | Draw | (Myanmar) Thutti Aung | Lethwei Challenge Fights | Mon State, Myanmar | Draw | 5 | 3:00 |
| 2008-05-03 | Win | (Austria) Thomas Hengstberger | Cage Fight Series 3, Eisstadion Graz Liebenau | Graz, Styria, Austria | TKO | 2 | |
| 2008-04-09 | Win | (Myanmar) Win Tun | Challenge Fights, Labutta | Labutta Township, Ayeyarwady Region, Myanmar | KO | 3 | |
| 2008-03-21 | Win | (Myanmar) Kyaw Nyein | Challenge Fights, Lamaing | Ye Township, Mon State, Myanmar | KO | 3 | |
| 2008-03-01 | Win | (Myanmar) Daung Nyo Lay | Lethwei Challenge Fights, Thuwunna National Indoor Stadium (1) | Yangon, Myanmar | KO | 2 | |
| 2008-02-00 | Win | (Myanmar) Win Tun | Challenge Fights, Hmawbi | Hmawbi Township, Yangon Region, Myanmar | TKO | 1 | |
| 2007-12-00 | Draw | (Myanmar) Daung Nyo Lay | Challenge Fights, San Daw Shin Phayar | Twante Township, Yangon, Myanmar | Draw | 5 | 3:00 |
| 2007-11-00 | Draw | (Myanmar) Daung Nyo Lay | Byai Ta Gaung Sayar Daw Festival | Byai Ta Gaung village, Mon State, Myanmar | Draw | 3 | 3:00 |
| 2007-11-00 | Draw | (Myanmar) Kyal Lin Aung | Challenge Fights, Thaung Pyin | Ye Township, Mon State, Myanmar | Draw | 6 | 5:00 |
| 2007-10-00 | Draw | (Myanmar) Daung Nyo Lay | Aghattan village Challenge Fights | Twante Township, Yangon, Myanmar | Draw | 5 | 3:00 |
| 2007-09-00 | Win | (Myanmar) Win Tun | Challenge Fights, Thaung Pyin | Ye Township, Mon State, Myanmar | KO | 3 | |
| 2007-09-09 | Win | (Myanmar) Thutti Aung | 2007 Golden Belt Championship Final | Yangon, Myanmar | KO | 3 | 2:38 |
Wins 60kg Golden Belt Championship & best boxer award
| 2007-09-01 | Win | (Myanmar) Maw Shee Lay | 2007 Golden Belt Championship Semi-final | Yangon, Myanmar | KO | 3 | 1:19 |
| 2007-08-28 | Win | (Myanmar) Hein Nyi Nyi | 2007 Golden Belt Championship Quarter-final | Yangon, Myanmar | KO | 2 | 1:56 |
| 2007-00-00 | Win | (Myanmar) Tar Toe War | Challenge Fights, Thaung Pyin | Ye Township, Mon State, Myanmar | KO | 5 | 20:00 |
| 2007-00-00 | Win | (Myanmar) Tun Tun | Myeik city Challenge Fights | Myeik Township, Tanintharyi Region, Myanmar | KO | 2 | |
| 2007-02-24 | Draw | (Myanmar) Thuya Ye Aung | Kandawgyi Lake, Myaw Sin Island Fights 2 | Yangon, Myanmar | Draw | 5 | 3:00 |
| 2006-02-00 | Win | (Myanmar) Tun Tun | Lethwei Challenge Fights | Kawkareik, Kayin State, Myanmar | KO | 2 | |
| 2006-02-00 | Draw | (Myanmar) Thutti Aung | Lethwei Challenge Fights | Hpa-an Township, Kayin State, Myanmar | Draw | 5 | 3:00 |
| 2006-01-25 | Win | (Myanmar) Dawna Aung | Myeik city Challenge Fights | Myeik Township, Tanintharyi Region, Myanmar | KO | 4 | |
| 2005-10-00 | Draw | (Myanmar) Yan Gyi Aung | Lethwei Challenge Fights | Insein Township, Yangon, Myanmar | Draw | 5 | 3:00 |
| 2005-02-00 | Loss | (Myanmar) Kyal Lin Aung | Karoppi Village Challenge Fights | Thanbyuzayat Township, Mon State, Myanmar | TKO (gave up) | 5 | |
| 2004-07-11 | Win | (Myanmar) A Mae Thar | Myanmar vs. Japan, Thuwunna National Indoor Stadium (1) (Day 2) | Yangon, Myanmar | KO | 4 | |
| 2000-00-00 | Win | (Myanmar) Nyi Nyi Soe | Lethwei Challenge Fights | Mon State, Myanmar | KO | 1 | |
Legend: Win Loss Draw/No contest Notes
