= Pyi Taw Pyan =

Burmese boxer and champion

- Pyi Taw Pyan in 1932
- Native name: ပြည်တော်ပြန်
- Nationality: Burmese
- Weight: 64 kg (141 lb; 10.1 st)
- Division: Lightweight
- Style: Lethwei
- Fighting out of: Kyauktalone village, Hpa-an, Karen State
- Rank: First class
- Years active: 1920s-1950s

Pyi Taw Pyan (Burmese: ပြည်တော်ပြန်) was a Burmese Lethwei fighter, well-known during the British rule in Burma. He became champion and owner of U Ba's cup in 1931.

== Lethwei career ==
In 1931, Pyi Taw Pyan was a contender and winner of Minister of Home Affairs U Ba's cup and medal. He reached the semi-finals together with La Yaung, "The Flying Indian" Kular Pyan and Ba Aye.

He entered the tournament again in 1932 to defend his honour. During the tournament, in an out-of-bracket match, he challenged a rival fighter to a fight until death without referees. Pyi Taw Pyan had learned that Kyar Aye Sein had won his quarter-final match by striking his downed opponent. Highly frowned upon, it prompted Pyi Taw Pyan to immediately storm the ring and challenge Kyar Aye Sein. The match was held the next day and converted to a gambling match where 30 Kyats was up for grabs for the winner. After an initial 4 rounds of fighting, Kyar Aye Sein's stalling was becoming so apparent that the referee stopped the match and announced Pyi Taw Pyan as the winner. The total match time was 60 minutes. Since tensions rose and Kyar Aye Sein started throwing tantrums, the ringside officials agreed to split the wager where Pyi Taw Pyan was awarded 20 Kyats and his opponent 10 Kyats. Pyi Taw Pyan eventually lost to Phyu Lay Gyi in the semi-finals of the tournament.

On January 25, 1933, Pyi Taw Pyan fought B.A Sein at King Carnival Stadium along Dalhousie Street in Yangon. After B.A Sein gave up in round four due to a lack of stamina, Pyi Taw Pyan called out English boxing champion George Goudie, title holder and lightweight champion of Burma. On that same evening Kyar Aye Sein offered a challenge to Kid D'Silva, featherweight champion of India and Burma. The sport of professional boxing enjoyed a short revival at this time, with George Goudie and Kid D'Silva at the forefront.

In 1935 Pyi Taw Pyan fought Htee Latt. After the fight, Pyi Taw Pyan experienced a case of hematemesis, attributed to the wearing of talismans and charms by Htee Latt during the fight. On May 2, 1935, first class boxers Min Khaung and Htee Latt fought in celebration of King George’s 25 years of reign. Min Khaung recalled the fight that Htee Latt had fought against Pyi Taw Pyan and thus insisted his opponent remove his charms before their fight.

His last recorded fight happened shortly before the invasion of the Japanese in 1941. He fought Min Khaung at Kandawgyi Lake which has been a popular area for lethwei fights up until this day.

== Titles and accomplishments ==
- Championships
  - Chief Justice U Ba's Championship winner (1931)
- Other accomplishments
  - Minister of Home Affairs U Ba's Championship semi-finalist (1932)
  - "Champion of Burma" gold medal, awarded by Sir Archibald Douglas Cochrane, Governor of British Burma

== Lethwei record ==
Professional Lethwei record (Incomplete)
10 fights, 6 wins (6 (T)KOs), 1 losses, 3 draws
Date	Result	Opponent	Event	Location	Method	Round	Time
1956-03-30		(Myanmar)	U Rama Hall	Amarapura, Burma			
Retirement fight
1941-04-27	Draw	(British rule in Burma) Min Khaung	Kandawgyi Lake	Rangoon, Burma	Draw		
1933-01-25	Win	(British Raj) B.A. Sein	King Carnival Stadium	Rangoon, Burma	TKO	4	
1932-12-31	Loss	(British Raj) Phyu Lay Gyi (Hnit Char)	U Ba's Championship semi-final	Rangoon, Burma	KO		
1932-12-28	Draw	(British Raj) Kyar Aye Sein (Pegu)	Hare Krishna Pilay Hall	Rangoon, Burma	Draw	4	60:00
Initial victory for Pyi Taw Pyan for stalling, but overturned by ringside judges.
1932-12-27	Win	(British Raj) Doe Phyu Kalay	U Ba's Championship quarter-final	Rangoon, Burma	KO		
1932-12-24	Win	(British Raj) Phyu Lay Gyi (Hnit Char)	Hare Krishna Pilay Hall	Rangoon, Burma	KO	2	
1932-01-01	Win	(British Raj) Ba Aye	U Ba's Championship final	Burma	TKO (hand injury)	2	
Wins Chief Justice U Ba's Championship Cup and Medal (first class)
1931-12-27	Win	(British Raj) La Yaung	U Ba's Championship semi-final	Burma	TKO (hand injury)		
1931-12-24	Win	(British Raj) Paw Sa	U Ba's Championship quarter-final	Burma	TKO (conceded)		
1931-12-19	Draw	(British Raj) College Sein	Sandwith x York Rd. Fairgrounds	Rangoon, Burma	Draw	3	
