= Saw Nga Man =

- Born: March 20, 1981 (age 45); Karen state, Burma
- Native name: စီၤငၢၤမါ
- Other names: Saw Shark; Aung Myint Win
- Height: 1.72 m (5 ft 7 1/2 in)
- Weight: 80 kg (180 lb; 13 st)
- Stance: Orthodox

Saw Nga Man (S'gaw Karen: စီၤငၢၤမါ, Burmese: စောငမန်း), also known as Saw Shark, is a retired Burmese Lethwei fighter and former Openweight Lethwei World Champion.

== Personal life ==
Saw Nga Man is an ethnic Karen.

== Lethwei career ==
On February 28, 2009, Saw Nga Man won the Openweight Lethwei Golden Belt from Lone Chaw in Yangon, Myanmar.

On 26 September 2010, Saw Nga Man faced Cyrus Washington at Thein Pyu Stadium. During the fight, Washington landed a powerful elbow on Saw Nga Man. The Burmese then avoided engagement trying to protect his swollen eye from more damage. With no stoppage, the fight ended in a draw according to Traditional Lethwei rules.

In 2013, he represented Myanmar in at the Southeast Asian Games 2013 and winning the Silver medal.

On September 21, 2014, Saw Nga Man lost the Openweight Golden Belt to Tun Tun Min at the Thein Pyu Stadium in Myanmar.

On April 18, 2017, Saw Nga Man knocked out Japanese fighter Teruhiko Kubo at Lethwei in Japan 3: Grit inside the Korakuen Hall in Tokyo, Japan.

In 2017, Saw Nga Man signed an exclusive contract with World Lethwei Championship. In 2018, Saw Nga Man fought at WLC 5: Knockout War against Micheal Badato and won by decision.

On January 9, 2019 just after his fight with Parinya M.U.Den in Taung Ka Lay, Saw Nga Man announced his retirement. With an estimated 190 fights on his record, the 37 year old boxer took off his wraps for good after nearly three decades of fighting. He continues to coach young talent at Shwe Phuu Club, one that he has represented for many years.

== Championships and accomplishments ==
- Lethwei World Champion
  - Openweight Lethwei Golden Belt
    - Fifteen title defenses
- Other championships
  - (gold) 2012 Dagon Shwe Aung Lan Champion
  - (gold) 2011 Dagon Shwe Aung Lan Champion
  - (gold) 2010 International Challenge Fight
  - (gold) 2010 Dagon Shwe Aung Lan Champion
  - (gold) 2009 Golden Belt Champion
  - (gold) 2009 Myanmar-Japan Goodwill Letwhei Competition
  - (gold) 2009 Dagon Shwe Aung Lan Champion
  - (silver) 2013 Southeast Asian Games

== Lethwei record ==
Professional Lethwei record
0 fights, 0 wins (0 (KO/TKO), 0 losses, 0 draws
Date	Result	Opponent	Event	Location	Method	Round	Time
2019-11-25	Draw	(Myanmar) Shwe Sai	Myanmar vs. Thailand Challenge Fights, Myaing Gyi Ngu	Hpa-an, Myanmar	Draw	5	3:00
2019-01-08	Draw	(Thailand) Parinya M.U.Den	26th Karen New Year Festival, Taung Ka Lay	Hpa-an, Myanmar	Draw	5	3:00
2018-12-19	Win	(Thailand) Yodkunkrai Por.Wiriya	DKBA 24th Anniversary Event, Son See Myaing	Myawaddy Township, Myanmar	KO	3	
2018-06-02	Win	(Australia) Louis Michael Badato	WLC 5: Knockout War	Naypyitaw, Myanmar	Decision	5	3:00
2017-12-20	Win	(Thailand) Yodkunkrai Por.Wiriya	26th Karen New Year Festival, Taung Ka Lay	Hpa-an, Myanmar	KO	4	
2017-11-04	Win	(Australia) Eddie Farrell	WLC 3: Legendary Champions	Yangon, Myanmar	Decision	5	3:00
2017-04-18	Win	(Japan) Teruhiko Kubo	Lethwei in Japan 3: Grit	Tokyo, Japan	TKO	1	
2017-03-23	Win	(Thailand) Pravit Sakmuangtalang	Yebyu township challenge fights	Tanintharyi Region, Myanmar	KO	4	
2015-10-25	Draw	(Myanmar) Saw Gaw Mu Do	Myanmar Ultimate Fight	Yangon, Myanmar	Draw	5	3:00
2015-08-30	Draw	(Myanmar) Tha Pyay Nyo	All Stars Big Fights	Yangon, Myanmar	Draw	5	3:00
2015-07-11	Draw	(Myanmar) Saw Gaw Mu Do	Sagaing city challenge fights	Sagaing, Myanmar	Draw	5	3:00
2014-09-21	Loss	(Myanmar) Tun Tun Min	Who is Number One?	Yangon, Myanmar	TKO	4	
Lost Openweight Lethwei Golden Belt
2014-08-17	Draw	(Myanmar) Too Too	Mandalay Rumbling Champion Challenge	Yangon, Myanmar	Draw	5	3:00
2014-04-01	Win	(Thailand) Petchtae Jaipetchkorsang	International Challenge Fights	Mon State, Myanmar	TKO	2	
2013-10-08	Draw	(Thailand) Pravit Aor.Piriyapinyo	Mandalay city challenge fights	Mandalay, Myanmar	Draw	5	3:00
2013-02-17	Draw	(Myanmar) Tway Ma Shaung	Burmese Championship Challenge Fight	Yangon, Myanmar	Draw	5	3:00
2012-01-08	Win	(Armenia) Davit	4th Dagon Shwe Aung Lan Championship Final	Yangon, Myanmar	Decision	5	3:00
2011-12-11	Win	(Thailand) Kittiphon	4th Dagon Shwe Aung Lan Championship Semi-Final	Yangon, Myanmar	KO	3	0:54
2011-11-04	Win	(Belgium) Matthias	Intl. Lethwei Challenge Fights	Mandalay, Myanmar	KO	3	
2011-08-14	Draw	(Japan) Naoki Samukawa	Myanmar vs. Japan Goodwill Letwhay Competition	Yangon, Myanmar	Draw	5	3:00
2011-07-16	Draw	(Myanmar) Phoe K	Lethwei Challenge Fights	Yangon, Myanmar	Draw	5	3:00
2011-01-16	Win	(Myanmar) Phoe K	3rd Dagon Shwe Aung Lan Championship Final	Yangon, Myanmar	Decision	5	3:00
2010-12-19	Win	(Myanmar) Mya Nan Taw	3rd Dagon Shwe Aung Lan Championship Semi-Final	Yangon, Myanmar	Decision	5	3:00
2010-09-26	Draw	(United States) Cyrus Washington	International Lethwei Challenge Fights	Yangon, Myanmar	Draw	5	3:00
2010-01-24	Win	(Myanmar) Shwe Sai	2nd Dagon Shwe Aung Lan Championship Final	Yangon, Myanmar	Decision	5	3:00
2009-09-20	Win	(Myanmar) Lone Chaw	Golden Belt Championship 2009 Final	Yangon, Myanmar	Decision	5	3:00
2009-05-03	Win	(Japan) Hiroaki Jinkawa	Myanmar vs. Japan Goodwill Letwhay Competition	Yangon, Myanmar	KO	1	
2009-04-05	Win	(Myanmar) Yan Gyi Aung	Dagon Shwe Aung Lan Championship Final	Yangon, Myanmar	KO	2	2:58
2009-03-01	Win	(Myanmar) Lone Chaw	Dagon Shwe Aung Lan Championship Semi-Final	Yangon, Myanmar	Decision	5	3:00
Wins Openweight Lethwei Golden Belt
2008-12-21	Draw	(Thailand) Thanwalek Chaiminburi	D.K.B.A 14th Anniversary	Myaing Gyi Ngu, Hpa-an Township, Myanmar	Draw	5	3:00
2008-09-28	Draw	(Myanmar) Lone Chaw	Calsome Challenge Fight-1	Yangon, Myanmar	Draw	5	3:00
2008-11-08	Win	(Thailand) Pichichai	Myanmar-Thai International Letwhay Challenge Fight	Yangon, Myanmar	KO	4	2:11
Wins International challenge fight belt
2008-09-28	Draw	(Myanmar) Lone Chaw	Calsome Challenge Fight-1	Yangon, Myanmar	Draw	5	3:00
2008-08-10	Win	(Myanmar) Daung Nyo Lay	Lethwei Challenge Fights	Yangon, Myanmar	KO	3	0:40
2008-01-27	Draw	(Myanmar) Lone Chaw	Sittwe Challenge Fights	Sittwe, Myanmar	Draw	5	3:00
2007-04-07	Loss	(Myanmar) Lone Chaw	Kandawgyi Park Challenge Fights	Yangon, Myanmar	KO	2	2:30
2007-02	Draw	(Myanmar) Lone Chaw	Lethwei Challenge Fights	Tachileik, Myanmar	Draw	5	3:00
2006-12	Loss	(Myanmar) Lone Chaw	Lethwei Challenge Fights	Mon State, Myanmar	KO	4	
2005-12-18	Loss	(Thailand) Korsuk Sitkriengkrai	DKBA 11th Anniversary Event	Myawaddy Township, Myanmar	KO	4	
2005-08-07	Draw	(Myanmar) Lone Chaw	23rd Southeast Asian Games placements and Challenge Fights	Yangon, Myanmar	Draw	5	3:00
2005-05-11	Win	(Myanmar) Eh Htee Kaw	Lethwei Challenge Fights	Myanmar	TKO	5	43:00
2001-04-29	Win	(Myanmar) Kyal Ta Pwint	Challenge Fights, Ba Htoo Football field	Mandalay, Myanmar	KO	4	0:55
1998-04-01	Win	(Myanmar) Sanay Thein	51st Mon National Day, Aung San Indoor Stadium	Yangon, Myanmar	KO	2	
1997-07-08	Draw	(Myanmar) Nga Man Phyu	Challenge Fights, Ba Htoo Football field	Mandalay, Myanmar	Draw	7	3:00
1997-05-04	Win	(Myanmar) Tun Tun	Challenge Fights, Ba Htoo Football field (7R)	Mandalay, Myanmar	KO		
Legend: Win Loss Draw/No contest Notes

Awards and achievements
Preceded by Lone Chaw	Openweight Lethwei World Champion; February 28, 2009 – September 21, 2014	Succeeded by Tun Tun Min
