= Shwe Sai =

- Born: Karen State, Myanmar
- Other names: ရွှေဆိုင်း
- Nationality: (Myanmar) Burmese
- Height: 1.79 m (5 ft 10 1/2 in)
- Weight: 80 kg (176 lb; 12 st 8 lb)
- Stance: Orthodox

Other information
- Children: Sai Maung Maung (son)

Shwe Sai (Burmese: ရွှေဆိုင်း) is a retired Burmese Lethwei fighter and former Openweight Lethwei World Champion.

== Personal life ==
Shwe Sai is born in the Karen state and has a son named Sai Maung Maung, who also competes in Lethwei and who is signed to the World Lethwei Championship.

== Lethwei career ==
On 10 and 11 July 2004, Shwe Sai and teammates Aye Bo Sein, Naing Wan Lay and Win Tun competed in a Lethwei tournament at Thuwunna National Indoor Stadium in Yangon, Myanmar. The Burmese fighters were matched against four Japanese fighters: Tamura, Yoshitaro Niimi, Takaharu Yamamoto and Seiji Wakasugi.

During his reign, Shwe Sai faced Zaw Win Tun, 1996 Golden Belt Champion, with Shwe Sai having the upper hand having won one fight while the other was a draw. On 2 August 2019, Shwe Sai's son Sai Maung Maung, was supposed to continue the rivalry and face the son of his past rival Saw Win Tun at WLC 9: King of Nine Limbs, but the fight was cancelled due to medical reason.

In 2006, Shwe Sai was stripped of the Openweight Lethwei World title due to inability to defend the title. Former Openweight champion Shwe War Tun was selected to faced number one contender Lone Chaw. Both men fought for the now vacant title to crown a new champion and Lone Chaw was victorious becoming the new Openweight Champion. On 4 May 2009, as reposted by MMA Mania, Shwe Sai and Lone Chaw eventually faced each other in Yangon. Shwe Sai knocked down Lone Chaw in a spectacular manner.

== Championships and accomplishments ==
=== Championships ===
- Lethwei World Champion
  - Openweight Lethwei Golden Belt

== Lethwei record ==
Professional Lethwei record
0 fights, 0 wins (0 (KO/TKO's), 0 losses, 0 draws
Date	Result	Opponent	Event	Location	Method	Round	Time
2019-11-25	Draw	(Myanmar) Saw Nga Man	Myanmar vs. Thailand Challenge Fights, Myaing Gyi Ngu	Hpa-an, Myanmar	Draw	2	3:00
2011	Draw	(Myanmar) Phoe Kay	Challenge Fight	Myanmar	Draw	5	3:00
2010-01-10	Draw	(Myanmar) Yan Gyi Aung	Win Sein Taw Ya 2010	Mudon Township, Myanmar	Draw	5	3:00
2009-04-05	Draw	(Myanmar) Lone Chaw	Dagon Shwe Aung Lan Final	Yangon, Myanmar	Draw	5	0:18
2009-02-28	Loss	(Myanmar) Yan Gyi Aung	Dagon Shwe Aung Lan Semi-final	Yangon, Myanmar	Decision	5	
2008-04-27	Draw	(Myanmar) Yan Gyi Aung	Challenge Fights, Aung San National Indoor Stadium	Yangon, Myanmar	Draw	5	3:00
Stipped from Openweight Lethwei Golden Belt in 2006 due to inability to defend
2005-10-16	Draw	(Myanmar) Lone Chaw	2nd City F.M Aung Lan Tournament, M.C.C.	Yangon, Myanmar	Draw	5	3:00
2004-07-11	Draw	(Japan) Yoshitaro Niimi	Myanmar vs. Japan Challenge Fights	Yangon, Myanmar	Draw	5	3:00
2004-06-13	Win	(Myanmar) Wan Chai	Challenge Fights, Thuwunna Gymnasium	Yangon, Myanmar	TKO	3	2:52
2004	Win	(Myanmar) Shan Lay Thway	Challenge Fight 2004	Yangon, Myanmar	KO		
Wins Openweight Lethwei Golden Belt
1999-08-01	Draw	(Myanmar) Ali	Ba Htoo football field	Mandalay, Myanmar	Draw	5	3:00
Wins Openweight Lethwei Golden Belt
Legend: Win Loss Draw/No contest Notes

Awards and achievements
Preceded by Shan Lay Thway	Openweight Lethwei World Champion; 2003 – May 21, 2006; Stripped due to inability to defend	Succeeded by Lone Chaw
