= Lone Chaw =

Burmese Lethwei fighter

- Born: October 30, 1976 (age 49); Nyaungdon, Ayeyarwady Region, Burma
- Native name: Maung Naing Lin
- Other names: လုံးချော
- Height: 1.83 m (6 ft 0 in)
- Weight: 80 kg (176 lb; 12 st 8 lb)
- Stance: Orthodox
- Team: Thut Ti Lethwei Gym, KLN
- Trainer: Saw Ayeyar; U Daung Nyo, Saw Nyi Nyi, Win Zin Oo
- Years active: 1995–2012

Other information
- Spouse: Ma Zin Zin Mya

Lone Chaw (Burmese: လုံးချော) is a retired Burmese Lethwei fighter and former Openweight Lethwei World Champion.

== Personal life ==
Lone Chaw is of Karen descent. He was born in a humble village in the Ayeyarwady division in Myanmar. He dropped out of school in the ninth grade and started working at the family farm full-time.

In 1995, he started training Lethwei and became determined to be a successful professional fighter when he learned his hometown did not boast a Myanmar Lethwei champion. He moved to Yangon in 1999 to pursue that goal. His first fight was at a traditional festival.

In 2012, he joined Thut Ti Lethwei Gym as head trainer and teacher under camp owner/promoter Win Zin Oo. In 2012, at 36 years old, Lone Chaw retired from fighting and started coaching. Lone Chaw eventually left Thut Ti to form his own camp with the help of his father.

== Lethwei career ==
Lone Chaw made a name for himself by fighting local and international competition. Notably, he was one of the first Lethwei fighter to go fight in Japan.

In 1999, Lone Chaw won the Myanmar Interstate Division Title and the Golden Belt Championship in 2006 and 2007. His most notorious fight was against the legendary Shwe War Tun in 2006, whom he had admired before he became a professional fighter. In an interview, Lone Chaw said "Shwe War Tun is an idol for me because of his fighting capability. I really respect him." In 2006, Shwe Sai was stripped of the Openweight Lethwei World title due to inability to defend the title. Former Openweight champion Shwe War Tun was selected to face Lone Chaw who was number one contender for the vacant openweight title. Traditionally the Lethwei Golden Belt is passed on by incapacitating the champion by KO, TKO or forfeit, but if the title is vacant it is mandatory to determine a winner. After 5 rounds, as it is mandatory to crown a new champion, Lone Chaw was declared winner and became the new Openweight Champion.

On April 26, 2008, the fight against Win Tun ended in a bloody draw. The result was a big blow to Lone Chaw's reputation, as the 63 kg challenger Win Tun controlled most of the fight.

On July 27, 2008, Lone Chaw who was coming from 10 consecutive draws, defeated Lethwei rising star Wunna by TKO in Yangon. Wunna was dropped by a fury of punches and wasn't able to answer the count.

On March 1, 2009, Lone Chaw lost the Openweight World title to Saw Nga Man in Yangon, Myanmar. Lone Chaw violated the MTLF traditional code of conduct and regulations in when he landed a heavy flying kick when on Saw Nga Man when he was in the corner of the ring with his back turned. The violation caused chaos and fans were calling for Lone Chaw's eviction from the ring. The organisers were forced to turn the lights out on the angry crowd. The three judges reminded Lone Chaw to abide by the traditional boxing rules. The electricity was restored within a few minutes but the crowd had turned on the champion Lone Chaw and was now cheering for Saw Nga Man on for the remainder of the bout. The chief judge U Dang Ni said he had taken Lone Chaw's conduct into account to crown the new champion. "The win was deserved for Saw Nga Man because he was superior to Lone Chaw, both in technique and in adhering to the rules and regulations," he said. Lone Chaw expressed that he never set out to deliberately break the code of conduct. He stated that the violation was made out of frustration since Saw Nga Man had been elusive and did not allow him to land his trademark flying knee or his straight right punches.

On 4 May 2009, as reported by MMA Mania, Lone Chaw faced Shwe Sai in Yangon and the fight ended as a draw. During the fight, Shwe Sai landed a spectacular knockout, however Lone Chaw used his special time-out and finished the fight aggressively, almost knocking out Shwe Sai at the end of the bout.

== Championships and accomplishments ==
=== Championships ===
- Lethwei World Champion
  - Openweight Lethwei Golden Belt
- Other titles
  - (gold) 2006 Golden Belt Champion
  - (gold) 2007 Golden Belt Champion
  - (gold) 2008 Intl. Challenge Fight victor
  - (gold) 1999 Myanmar Interstate Tournament Champion

== Lethwei record ==
Lethwei record
43 fights, 13 wins (11 (KO/TKOs), 7 losses, 24 draws
Date	Result	Opponent	Event	Location	Method	Round	Time
2014-08-17	Draw	(Myanmar) Shwe War Tun	National Championship Challenge event	Yangon, Myanmar	Draw	3	3:00
2013-01-04	Draw	(Myanmar) Yan Gyi Aung	Mandalay Rumbling Challenge	Taungoo, Myanmar	Draw	5	3:00
2012-09-15	Draw	(New Zealand) Rua Druce	Mandalay Rumbling International Challenge	Yangon, Myanmar	Draw	5	3:00
2012-03-27	Draw	(Myanmar) Kyal Lin Aung	Lethwei Challenge Fights & Fundraiser	Pyay Township, Myanmar	Draw	5	3:00
2011-11-05	Draw	(Myanmar) Tun Tun	Myanmar vs. Australia Challenge Fights	Yangon, Myanmar	Draw	5	3:00
2011-05-17	Loss	(Myanmar) Phoe Kay	Challenge Fights	Mudon Township, Myanmar	KO	4	
2010-12-26	Loss	(Myanmar) Phoe Kay	Dagon Shwe Aung Lan Championship Semi-final	Yangon, Myanmar	KO	4	0:32
2010-08-02	Loss	(Myanmar) Phoe Kay	Myingyan Challenge Fights	Mandalay, Myanmar	KO		
2009-12-14	Loss	(Myanmar) Shwe Sai	Dagon Shwe Aung Lan Championship Semi-final	Yangon, Myanmar	Decision	5	3:00
2009-10-25	Draw	(Thailand) Fahsura PSR Muay Thai Gym	Myanmar vs. Thailand Challenge Fights	Yangon, Myanmar	Draw	5	3:00
2009-09-20	Loss	(Myanmar) Saw Nga Man	2009 Golden Belt Championship Final	Yangon, Myanmar	Decision	5	3:00
2009-05-03	Draw	(Japan) Naoki Samukawa	Myanmar vs. Japan Goodwill Letwhay Competition	Yangon, Myanmar	Draw	5	3:00
2009-04-05	Draw	(Myanmar) Shwe Sai	Dagon Shwe Aung Lan Championship Final	Yangon, Myanmar	Draw	5	3:000
2009-03-01	Loss	(Myanmar) Saw Nga Man	Dagon Shwe Aung Lan Championship Semi-final	Yangon, Myanmar	DQ	5	3:00
Lost Openweight Lethwei Golden Belt - Lone Chaw violated the MTLF traditional code of conduct.
2008-11-30	Draw	(Myanmar) Win Tun	Lethwei Challenge Fights	Yangon, Myanmar	Draw	5	3:00
2008-11-09	Win	(Thailand) Tunthong	Myanmar-Thai International Letwhay Challenge Fight	Yangon, Myanmar	KO	3	2:44
2008-09-28	Draw	(Myanmar) Saw Nga Man	Calsome Challenge Fight-1	Yangon, Myanmar	Draw	5	3:00
2008-08-10	Win	(Myanmar) Yan Gyi Aung	Lethwei Challenge Fights	Yangon, Myanmar	KO	5	2:36
2008-07-27	Win	(Myanmar) Wunna	Thuwunna Indoor Stadium	Yangon, Myanmar	KO	2	1:44
2008-04-26	Draw	(Myanmar) Win Tun	Kandawgyi Park	Yangon, Myanmar	Draw	5	3:00
2008-03-09	Draw	(Myanmar) Shwe Sai	National Championship Challenge event (Shwe Sai)	Yangon, Myanmar	Draw	5	3:00
2008-02-22	Draw	(Myanmar) Shan Lay Thway	Kandawgyi Park	Yangon, Myanmar	Draw	5	3:00
2008-02-12	Draw	(Myanmar) Yan Gyi Aung	Challenge Fights	Mandalay, Myanmar	Draw	5	3:00
2008-02-02	Draw	(Myanmar) Thuya Ye Aung	Challenge Fights	Mawlamyine, Myanmar	Draw	5	3:00
2008-01-27	Draw	(Myanmar) Saw Nga Man	Sittwe Challenge Fights	Sittwe, Myanmar	Draw	5	3:00
2007-12-23	Draw	(Myanmar) Kyal Lin Aung	Lethwei Challenge Fights	Yangon, Myanmar	Draw	5	3:00
2007-11-23	Draw	(Myanmar) Yan Gyi Aung	Kandawgyi Park	Yangon, Myanmar	Draw	5	3:00
2007-10-23	Draw	(Myanmar) Shan Lay Thway	Kandawgyi Park	Yangon, Myanmar	Draw	5	3:00
2007-09-09	Win	(Myanmar) Zan Htoo	Golden Belt Championship	Yangon, Myanmar	Decision	5	3:00
2007-08-19	Win	(United States) Nick Fiordo	Myanmar vs. Japan Challenge Fights	Differ Ariake Tokyo, Japan	KO	3	1:34
2007-05-12	Draw	(Myanmar) Zan Htoo	Kandawgyi Park	Yangon, Myanmar	Draw	5	3:00
2007-04-07	Win	(Myanmar) Saw Nga Man	Kandawgyi Park Challenge Fights	Yangon, Myanmar	KO	2	2:30
2007-02	Draw	(Myanmar) Saw Nga Man	Lethwei Challenge Fights	Tachileik, Myanmar	Draw	5	3:00
2007-01-07	Win	(Myanmar) Shwe War Tun	Kandawgyi Park	Yangon, Myanmar	KO	2	1:55
2006-05-21	Win	(Myanmar) Shwe War Tun	Golden Belt Championship	Yangon, Myanmar	Decision	5	3:00
Wins vacant Openweight Lethwei Golden Belt
2006-03-17	Win	(Japan) Tetsuya Yamauchi	Kushima's Fight 12	Shinjuku FACE Tokyo, Japan	KO	3	2:10
2006-01-26	Win	(Myanmar) Wan Chai	Myeik city Lethwei Challenge Fights	Myeik, Myanmar	Draw	3	
2005-10-16	Draw	(Myanmar) Shwe Sai	2nd City F.M Aung Lan Tournament, Myanmar Convention Center	Yangon, Myanmar	Draw	5	3:00
2005-09-11	Win	(Japan) Wataru Imamura	Kushima's Fight 10	Nagasaki Peace Kaikan Hall Nagasaki, Japan	KO	1	1:25
2005-08-07	Draw	(Myanmar) Saw Nga Man	23rd Southeast Asian Games placements and Challenge Fights	Yangon, Myanmar	Draw	5	3:00
2005-04-03	Draw	(Myanmar) Wan Chai	City F.M Aung Lan Tournament, Myanmar Convention Center	Yangon, Myanmar	Draw	5	3:00
2004-06-05	Loss	(Myanmar) Wan Chai	Myeik city Lethwei Challenge Fights	Myeik, Myanmar	KO	3	2:50
2004-02-29	Win	(Myanmar) Ali (Thaton)	First class Challenge Fights at Thuwunna Gymnasium	Yangon, Myanmar	KO		
2003-05-18	Draw	(Myanmar) Thuya Ye Aung	Challenge Fights, Meiktila District Sports Hall	Meiktila, Myanmar	Draw	5	3:00
Legend: Win Loss Draw/no contest Notes

Awards and achievements
Preceded by Shwe Sai	Openweight Lethwei World Champion; May 21, 2006 – February 28, 2009; Wins vacant title	Succeeded by Saw Nga Man
