= Wan Chai (fighter) =

Burmese Lethwei fighter and Openweight Lethwei World Champion

- Born: Saw Han Thein; January 24, 1972 (age 53); Kawt Nwe village, Kawkareik Township, Myawaddy District, Kayin State, Burma
- Native name: စောဟန်သိန်း
- Other names: A Lwan (အလွမ်း)
- Nationality: Myanmar
- Height: 165 cm (5 ft 5 in)
- Weight: 71 kg (157 lb; 11.2 st)
- Style: Lethwei
- Stance: Orthodox
- Team: HERO, KLN, Kywe Min, Aung Myanmar, Adventure, Royal D Wan Chai
- Trainer: Myawaddy U Than Shwe, Panudej Petchkasem, U A Nwe, U Min Oo
- Years active: 1989–2012

Other information
- Children: 1
- Notable relatives: Lwann Chai (son)

Wan Chai (Burmese: ဝမ်ချိုင်း) (born January 24, 1972) is a former Burmese Lethwei fighter and Openweight Lethwei World Champion in 1998 and 1999.

== Early life ==
Wan Chai was born in 1972 to father U Pan Nyunt and mother Daw Khin May in Kawt Nwe, a village east of Kawkareik city in Kayin State. He started his training initially with Myawaddy U Than Shwe, a former boxer well known with the arts in both Myanmar and Thailand himself.

== Lethwei career ==
Before his fame in Myanmar lethwei Wan Chai was already a veteran of the fight game with great experiences gained in Thailand. In 1996, the Myanmar Traditional Lethwei Federation (MTLF), a branch of the Myanmar's Ministry of Health and Sports, created the Golden Belt Championship for rising talents which uses the tournament Lethwei rules, unlike the traditional Golden Belt.

After returning to Myanmar, Wan Chai burst onto the scene and competed at the inaugural Golden Belt Championship which he won by defeating Aung Aung Tun. In 1998, he challenged the reigning Myanmar Lethwei World Champion Shwe Du Wun. Wan Chai took the Openweight Lethwei Golden Belt title away from the champion within three rounds. Wan Chai lost the title to Shan La Tway in a year later. After his retirement, Wan Chai made a commitment to support the Aung Myanmar lethwei club in 2016, which trained Daung Thi Chay, Lwann Chai, Saw George, Yan Linn Aung and Daung Phyu Lay at the time. He transferred to several clubs but eventually ended up with the one carrying his own name. His most notable students are his son Lwann Chai and Thway Thit Win Hlaing.

=== Myanmar vs USA challenge ===
In June 2001, the first international Lethwei event took place in Yangon with professional fighters from the United States facing Burmese fighters under full traditional Lethwei rules. Wan Chai was matched against American UFC veteran Doug Evans and the event was named International Myanmar traditional boxing challenge & Myanmar-Australia talent testing boxing competition in Yangon, Myanmar. In the first round, Evans was dropped to the floor with a knee strike to the lower abdomen while clinching and lost by referee stoppage (TKO). Evans later claimed he was kneed in the groin by Wan Chai, however the official did not see the strike and the referee stoppage remained.

== Titles and accomplishments ==
- Championships
  - Myanmar National Champion (1998, 1999)
  - Golden Belt Champion (1996)
- Other championships
  - 2001 challenge fight belt holder

== Lethwei record ==
Professional Lethwei record
69 wins, 3 losses, 8 draws
Date	Result	Opponent	Event	Location	Method	Round	Time
2012-01-08	Draw	(Myanmar) Shwe War Tun	Dagon Shwe Aung Lan 2012	Yangon, Myanmar	Draw	3	3:00
2009-04-04	Draw	(Myanmar) Zarni Sin Yine	Dagon Shwe Aung Lan 2009	Yangon, Myanmar	Draw	3	3:00
2009-02-06	Draw	(Myanmar) Shwe War Tun	Myaw Sin Island Challenge Fights	Yangon, Myanmar	Draw	3	3:00
2009-00-00	Draw	(Myanmar) Saw Thae Aung	Lethwei Challenge Fights	Myanmar	Draw	5	3:00
2006-01-26	Loss	(Myanmar) Lone Chaw	Myeik city Lethwei Challenge Fights	Myeik, Myanmar	TKO	3	
2005-04-03	Draw	(Myanmar) Lone Chaw	City F.M Aung Lan Tournament, Myanmar Convention Center	Yangon, Myanmar	Draw	5	3:00
2004-06-13	Loss	(Myanmar) Shwe Sai	Challenge Fights, Thuwunna Stadium	Yangon, Myanmar	TKO	3	2:52
2004-06-05	Win	(Myanmar) Lone Chaw	Myeik city Lethwei Challenge Fights	Myeik, Myanmar	KO	3	2:50
2003-06-01	Draw	(Myanmar) Shan Lay Thway	Challenge Fights, Thuwunna Stadium	Yangon, Myanmar	Draw	5	3:00
2001-06-09	Win	(United States) Doug Evans	International Challenge Fights, Thuwunna Stadium	Yangon, Myanmar	TKO	1	
Wins challenge fight belt
2001-04-30	Draw	(Myanmar) Shan Lay Thway	Challenge Fights, Ba Htoo Football field	Mandalay, Myanmar	Draw	5	3:00
1999-00-00	Loss	(Myanmar) Shan Lay Thway	Champions Challenge, Thuwunna Stadium	Yangon, Myanmar	TKO	1	
Lost Openweight Lethwei World Title - Wan Chai contracted malaria shortly before the fight
1998-00-00	Win	(Myanmar) Win Naing Tun	Challenge Fights, Ba Htoo Football field	Mandalay, Myanmar	KO	2	
1998-00-00	Win	(Myanmar) Shwe Du Wun	Hpayarkone village Challenge Fights	Hpa-an Township, Myanmar	KO		
1998-04-01	Win	(Myanmar) Shwe Du Wun	51st Mon National Day, Aung San Indoor Stadium	Yangon, Myanmar	KO	3	1:04
Wins Openweight Lethwei World Title
1997-11-06	Draw	(Myanmar) Shwe Du Wun	Challenge Fights, Ba Htoo Football field	Mandalay, Myanmar	Draw	5	3:00
1997-07-09	Draw	(Myanmar) Shwe Du Wun	Challenge Fights, Ba Htoo Football field	Mandalay, Myanmar	Draw	12	3:00
1997-05-05	Draw	(Myanmar) Aung Aung Tun	(52nd) Armed Forces Day Challenge Fights, Ba Htoo Football field	Mandalay, Myanmar	Draw	7	3:00
1997-00-00	Win	(Myanmar) Moe Palae	Lethwei Challenge Fights	Hpa-an Township, Myanmar	KO	6	
1997-02-25	Win	(Myanmar) Shwe War Tun	Kawt Gun village Challenge Fights	Hlaingbwe Township, Myanmar	KO	4	
1997-02-03	Win	(Myanmar) (Thar Si) Maung Maung Gyi	Lethwei Challenge Fights, Aung San Indoor Stadium	Yangon, Myanmar	KO	4	
1997-02-02	Win	(Myanmar) Aung Aung Tun	Golden Belt Championship, Aung San Indoor Stadium	Yangon, Myanmar	KO	4	
Wins Golden Belt Championship
1997-01-09	Win	(Thailand) Kittichai Kiatbusaba	International Challenge Fights	Chiang Mai, Thailand	TKO	4	
1995-00-00	Loss	(Thailand) Somdang Nongkhai	International Challenge Fights	Thailand	TKO		
1995-00-00	Draw	(Thailand) Kolalek Lookphrayapichai	Burma-Thai Challenge Fights	Thailand	Draw	5	

Awards and achievements
Preceded by Shwe Du Wun	Openweight Lethwei World Champion; April 1, 1998 – 1999	Succeeded by Shan Lay Thway
