= Lethwei =

Burmese martial art

Lethwei လက်ဝှေ့
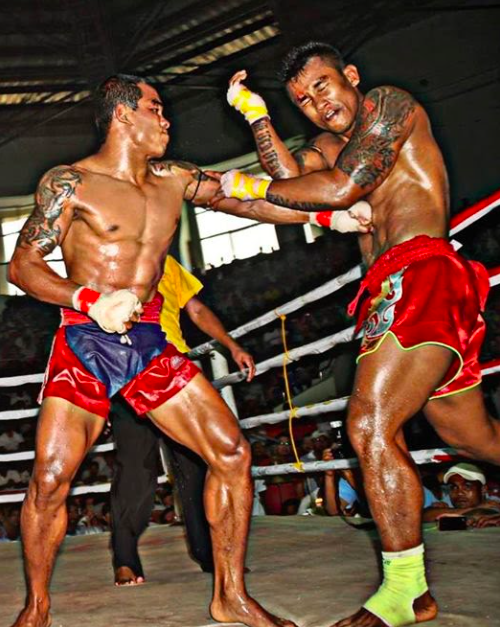
- Also known as: Burmese boxing Art of Nine Limbs
- Focus: Striking
- Hardness: Full-contact
- Country of origin: Myanmar
- Famous practitioners: List of Lethwei fighters

Lethwei, Let-hwei or Lek Whay (UK: /ˈlɛk hweɪ/ or US: /ˈlɛk weɪ/, LEH-k way ; Burmese: လက်ဝှေ့, IPA: [lɛʔ.ʍḛ]), also called Burmese boxing, is a full-contact combat sport originating in Myanmar and is considered one of the most brutal martial arts in the world. Lethwei fighters use stand-up striking techniques such as kicks, knees, elbows, and punches. The use of headbutts is also permitted. Fighters compete bareknuckle, wrapping their hands with only tape and gauze. Disallowed in most combat sports, headbutts are important weapons in a Lethwei fighter's arsenal, giving Lethwei its name of the "Art of Nine Limbs". In traditional rules, each corner is allowed one two-minute timeout per fight to revive a KO’d fighter. This, combined with its bareknuckle nature, gave Lethwei a reputation for being one of the bloodiest and most violent martial arts. Although popular throughout Myanmar, Lethwei has been primarily and historically associated with the Karen peoples of the Kayin State; the vast majority of competitive Lethwei fighters are ethnolinguistically of Karen descent.

== History ==
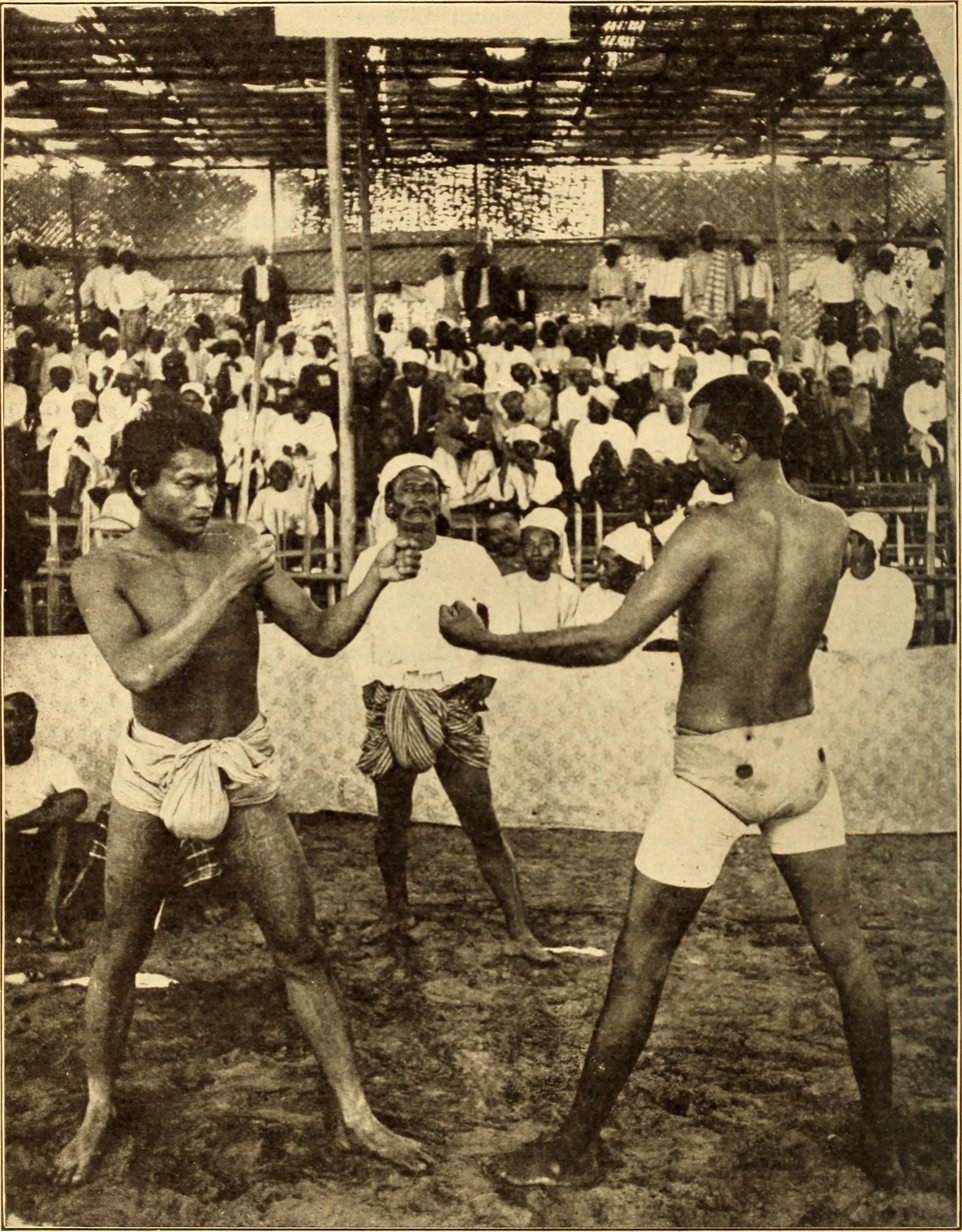
Late 19th-century Lethwei match in Myanmar. The fighter on the left bears a Htoe Kwin tattoo and a hitched-up longyi (paso hkadaung kyaik).

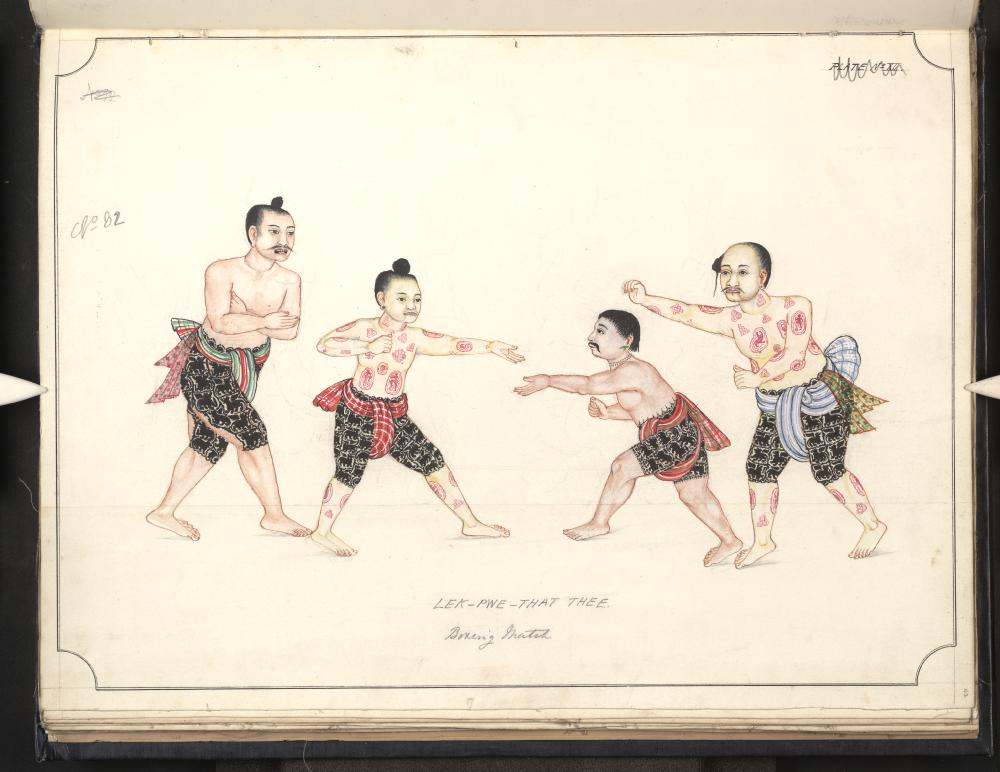
Watercolour painting from 1897 depicting a 19th-century boxing match. All fighters wear longyi and Htoe Kwin tattoos.

The traditional martial arts of Myanmar are regrouped under a term called "thaing", which includes bando, banshay, naban, shan gyi and Lethwei. According to researchers, thaing can be traced in its earliest form to the 12th century of the Pagan Kingdom dynasty.

In Bagan, some carvings on temples and pagodas in the central Myanmar plains appear to show pairs of men locked in combat, suggesting the sport is potentially over a thousand years old.

In ancient times, matches were held for entertainment and were popular with every stratum of society. Participation was opened to any male, whether noble or commoner. At that time, matches took place in sand pits instead of rings. Boxers fought without protective equipment, only wrapping their hands in hemp or gauze. There were no draws; the fight went on until one of the participants was knocked out or could no longer continue. Back then, Burmese boxing champions would enter the ring and call for open challenges.

Lethwei went through many years of suppression during the British colonial rule of Burma. The sport was revived under General Ne Win's nationalistic government. Unlike Muay Thai, in Lethwei, punches are generally favoured over kicks because of their ability to draw blood more easily. Traditional matches include the Flagship Tournament, which are still fought throughout Myanmar, especially during holidays or celebration festivals like Thingyan. In rural areas, having a skilled child fighter has been a way of escaping poverty.

=== The New Era ===
In modern times, the sport is kept alive in Lower Myanmar in Mon State and Kayin State, where matches are held for events such as New Year's celebrations.

Kyar Ba Nyein, who participated in boxing at the 1952 Summer Olympics, pioneered modern Lethwei by setting in place modern rules and regulations. He travelled around Myanmar, especially the Mon and Karen states, where Lethwei is more actively practiced. After training with some of the fighters, Kyar Ba Nyein brought some to Mandalay and Yangon to compete in matches.

In 1996, the Myanmar Traditional Lethwei Federation (MTLF), a branch of Myanmar's Ministry of Health and Sports, added the modern Lethwei rules for the occasion of the Golden Belt Championship in Yangon. The bouts, along with the undercard fights, were organized by the Ministry of Sport, Myanmar Traditional Lethwei Federation and KSM group. This marked a big addition to the art of Lethwei and potentially would make Burmese boxing more marketable internationally.

On 18 July 2015, ONE Championship held the first Lethwei fight in its history inside a cage on the occasion of ONE Championship: Kingdom of Warriors in Yangon, Myanmar. The fight showcased Burmese fighters Phyan Thway and Soe Htet Oo in a dark match, and the result was a draw according to the traditional Lethwei rules.

In 2017, ONE Championship and World Lethwei Championship officially entered into a partnership to share athletes to fight in each other's organization. On 30 June 2017, ONE Championship held a Lethwei match at ONE Championship: Light of a Nation between Thway Thit Win Hlaing and Soe Htet Oo. Thway Thit Win Hlaing eventually won the match under the WLC point system.

In 2016, Myanmar's first international Lethwei promotion, officially named World Lethwei Championship (WLC), launched its events using the tournament Lethwei rules.

In 2019, the WLC made history by broadcasting WLC 7: Mighty Warriors, the first Lethwei event, internationally live on UFC Fight Pass.

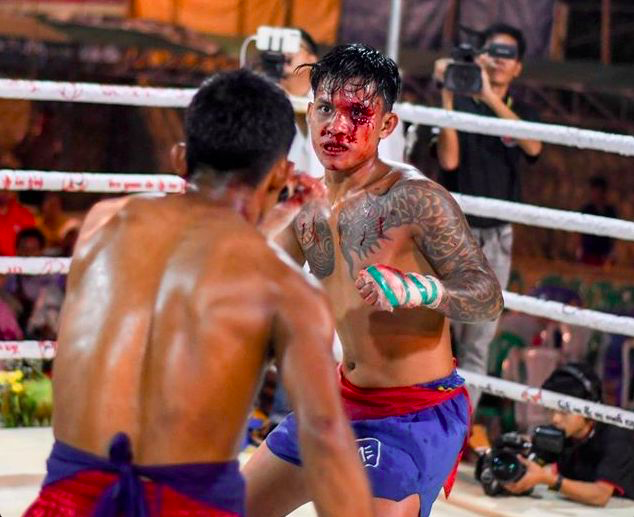
A Lethwei match

==== Opening to the world ====
From 7 to 12 July 2001, twelve years after Burma changed its name to Myanmar, the first international event took place in Yangon with professional fighters from the United States facing Burmese fighters under full traditional Lethwei rules. The delegation of three American fighters brought by the IKF were Shannon Ritch, Albert Ramirez, and Doug Evans. Ritch faced Ei Htee Kaw, Ramirez faced Saw Thei Myo, and Evans faced openweight Lethwei champion Wan Chai. All three Americans lost to the Burmese. In 2002, Lethwei promoters and the military canceled a revenge match involving American, Cambodian, and European fighters at the last minute. This landmark event would have been the first time top Cambodian fighters would compete against the Burmese either in Myanmar or Cambodia.

From 10 to 11 July 2004, the second event headlining foreigners took place, with four Japanese fighters fighting against Burmese fighters. They were mixed martial arts fighters Akitoshi Tamura, Yoshitaro Niimi, Takeharu Yamamoto, and Naruji Wakasugi. Tamura knocked out Aya Bo Sein in the second round and became the first foreigner to beat a Myanmar Lethwei practitioner in an official match. International matches continued with the exciting Cyrus Washington vs. Tun Tun Min trilogy. Their first fight in 2014 ended with a spectacular knockout win for Washington.

In 2016, after having previously fought to an explosive draw, Dave Leduc and Tun Tun Min rematched at the Air KBZ Aung Lan Championship in Yangon, Myanmar. The rematch was sweetened by an added bonus: ownership of the Lethwei Openweight

Championship Belt. Leduc became the first non-Burmese fighter to win the Lethwei Golden Belt and become Lethwei world champion after defeating Tun Tun Min in the third round due to a knee injury, which caused Tun Tun Min to forfeit the match.

On 18 April 2017, for his second title defense under traditional rules, Dave Leduc faced Turkish Australian challenger Adem Yilmaz at Lethwei in Japan 3: Grit in Tokyo, Japan. This marked the first Lethwei World title fight headlining two non-Burmese in the sport's history, and for the occasion, the Ambassador of Myanmar to Japan was present at the event held in the Korakuen Hall.

==== Sanctioning worldwide ====
Due to the violent ruleset, Lethwei is difficult to sanction and is illegal in most countries outside of Myanmar. Even though headbutts are allowed in Lethwei, they are banned from most other combat sports, including mixed martial arts, kickboxing, and Muay Thai(bare-knuckle Muay still is fought yearly). Technically, it is not banned in Thailand, and bare-knuckle full rules are fought yearly in the televised Thailand vs. Myanmar shows fought during Songkran that have gone on since 1986. The competitions go back even farther, probably since the early 1900s. Thailand uses the full ancient Muay rules, including headbutts, throws, and two referees in the ring. As of 2022, Myanmar Lethwei is legal only in the following countries: Myanmar, Japan, Singapore, Slovakia, Austria, Thailand, Taiwan, United Kingdom, United States (only the state of Wyoming), New Zealand, and Poland. The World Lethwei Federation has the responsibility to sanction and support the growth of Lethwei worldwide outside of Myanmar.

== In popular culture ==
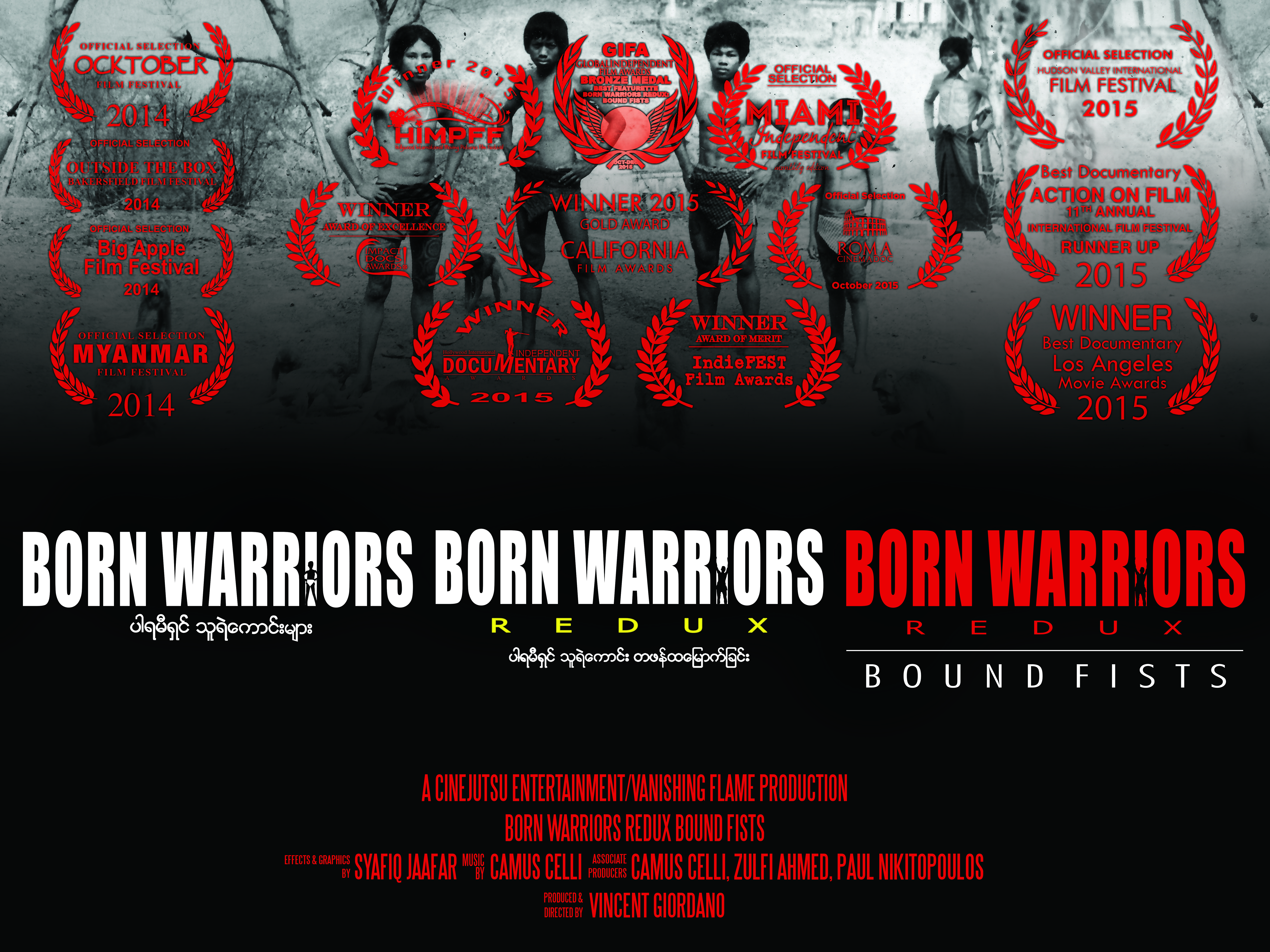
Trilogy poster for the documentary series Born Warriors (2014), which documented the sport of Lethwei.

Lethwei has been featured in a variety of popular culture and mass media, including written works, live-action film and television, and animation in Myanmar and occasionally abroad. Media documentation of Lethwei includes Vincent Giordano's multi-part documentary series Born Warriors. Active research and filming for the project began in 1999, and the first installment premiered at the Myanmar Film Festival in 2014. In 2016, international media coverage of the sport gradually increased following the arrival of Canadian fighter Dave Leduc, who won the openweight Golden Belt championship that year under traditional rules. In 2018, Frank Grillo travelled to Myanmar and featured Lethwei in the Netflix documentary FightWorld. In 2019, Lethwei was featured in The Joe Rogan Experience podcast by Joe Rogan with Leduc as a guest. The sport has also been featured in the popular Japanese manga series Kengan Ashura. In the series, the Burmese Lethwei master named Saw Paing is so indestructible that an opponent shatters every bone in their hand trying to punch him.

== Traditional gesture ==
=== Lekkha moun ===
The lekkha moun is the traditional gesture performed by Lethwei fighters to challenge their opponents with courage and respect. The lekkha moun is performed by clapping 3 times with the right palm to the triangle-shaped hole formed while bending the left arm. The clapping hand must be in the form of a cup, while the left hand must be placed under the right armpit. The lekkha moun is done at the beginning of the Lethwei yay and can also be done while fighting.

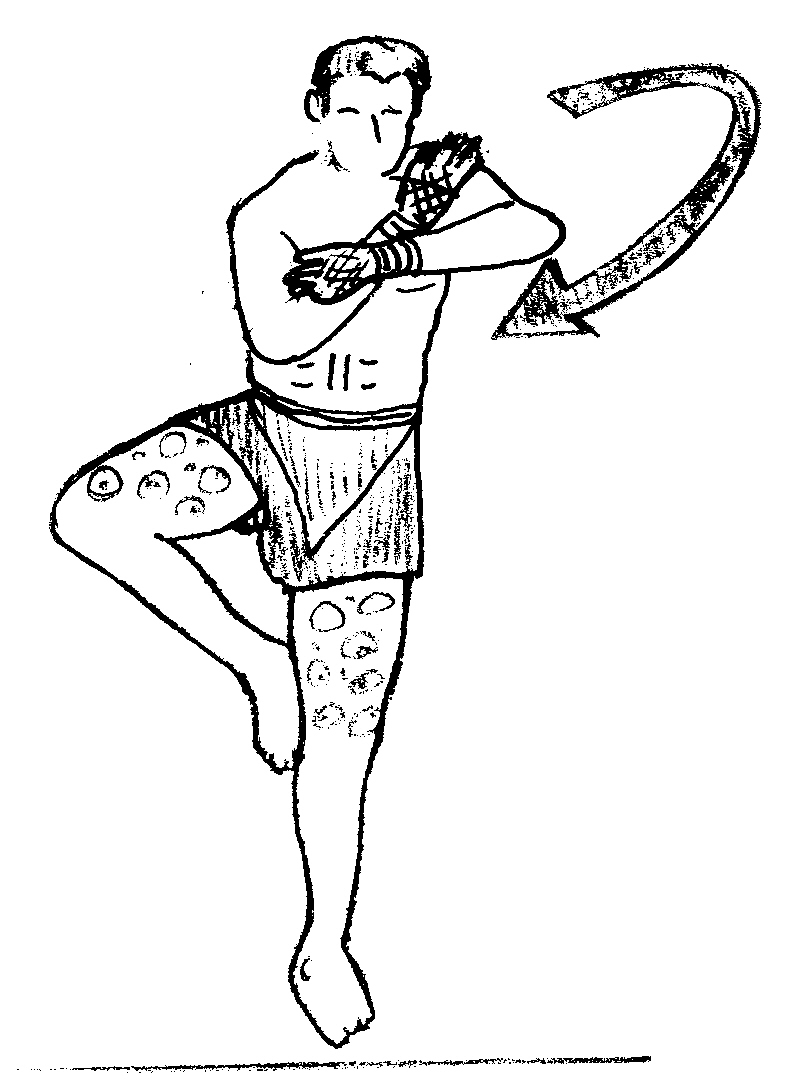
Illustration of the lekkha moun

This invitation to fight is inspired by the birds of prey, like the eagle, as they flap their wings when flying and hunting.

=== Lethwei yay ===
The Lethwei yay could be described as a fight dance. Fighters commonly perform it before the fight to showcase their fighting skills and as a victory dance after the fight. The lekkha moun is usually confused with the lethwei yay, but the lekkha moun is done along with the Lethwei yay.

Before modernisation, especially during the colonial period, the pre-fight dance was more commonly referred to as han yay (ဟန်ရေး). Performed in accordance with the tempo of the traditional orchestra (ဆိုင်း), it incorporated a much more elaborate dance and show of skills. Boastful poetry was sometimes recited along with the dance.

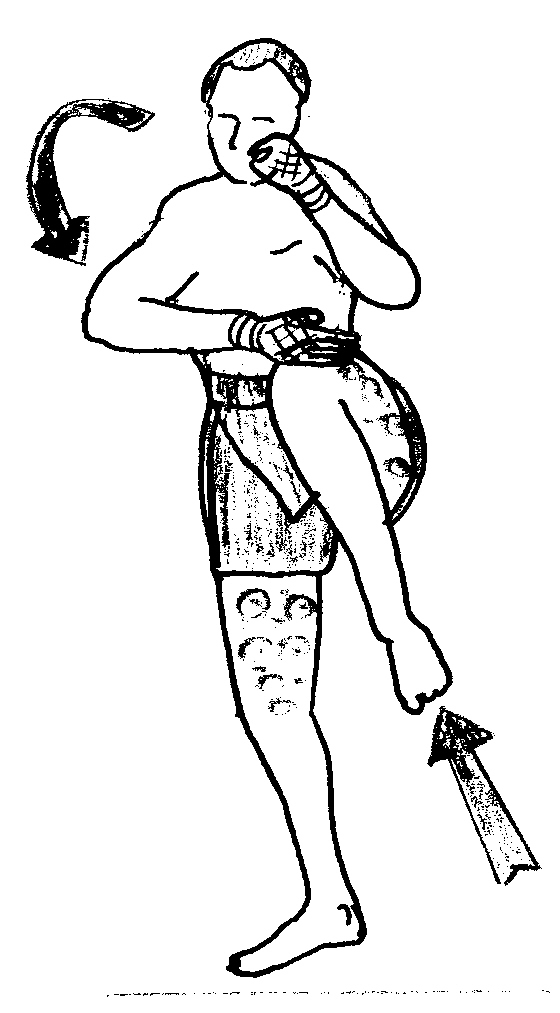

== Rules ==
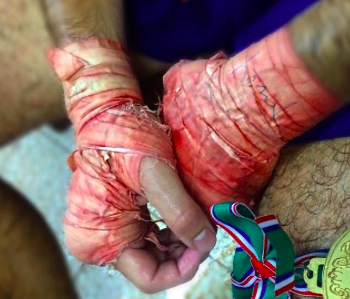
Bloody Lethwei hand wraps

Permitted techniques

- Headbutts
- All punches
- All elbow strikes
- All knee strikes
- All kicks
- Extensive clinching
- Sweeps, throws and take-downs

The use of the feet, hands, knees, elbows and head is permitted.

Rounds

Each bout can be booked as a 3, 4 or 5 round fight with 3 minutes per round and a 2-minute break in between rounds. Championship bouts are 5 round fights with 3 minutes per round and a 2-minute break between rounds. When a knockout occurs the match is done, if no knock out occurs the fight is rescheduled or called a tie.

Fighting attire

The Burmese bare-knuckle boxing rules prohibits the use of gloves.

- The fighters must only wear tape, gauze and electrical tape on their hands and feet.
- The fighters shall wear only shorts, without a shirt or shoes.
- The fighters must wear a groin protector.
- The fighters must wear a gum shield.

The fighters are required to apply the wrapping in front of the fight officials, who will endorse the wraps.

Referee

One referee oversees the fight. The referee has the power to:

- End the fight if he considers one fighter to be significantly outclassed by his opponent.
- Stop the fight and refer to the doctor if a fighter is heavily wounded.
- Warn the fighters. He makes sure the fight proceeds fairly and in compliance with the rules.

=== Traditional rules ===
The traditional rules, also known as yoe yar rules, which comes from the Burmese Myanma yoe yar Letway, which means Myanmar traditional boxing. Traditional matches are still fought throughout Myanmar, especially during festivals or celebrations like Thingyan. Traditional Lethwei is notorious for not having a scoring system and for its controversial rule of knock-out only to win.

At the end of the match, in the eventuality that there is no knockout or stoppage, if the two fighters are still standing, even if one fighter dominated the fight, the match is declared a draw. Fighters can win by incapacitating their rivals in a few different ways.

- A knock-out (KO) is when a fighter falls to the ground, leans unconscious or if a fighter is unable to stand up or defend themself for 20 seconds (10 counts with 1 count every 2 seconds).
- When 3 counts are performed in a single round, the fight is terminated and scored as knock-out (count limit) (KO).
- When 4 counts are performed during the entire duration of the fight, the match is terminated and scored as knock-out (count limit) (KO).
- A technical knock-out (TKO) is when a fighter forfeits, has an injury or is in a position that can damage or severely harm them if the fight continues. The ring doctor is consulted and makes the decision.

Promotions that use traditional rules

- Most Lethwei promotions in Myanmar
- Annual Myanmar Lethwei World Championship
- Air KBZ Aung Lan Championship
- International Lethwei Federation Japan
- Challenge fights
- Flagship Tournaments
- Festivals & celebrations

==== Special time-out ====
- If a knockout or injury occurs, the fighter can take a special 2 minute time-out to recover. After the time-out the fighter can choose whether he wishes to continue the bout or not. Each fighter may only do so once during the fight.
- The time-out cannot be used in the fifth round.
- The use of the time-out is considered as 1 count.

==== Golden Belt ====
The traditional Lethwei Golden Belt is regarded as the highest and most prestigious award for Lethwei fighters. Not to be confused with the annual Golden Belt Championship, composed mostly of younger rising talent and using the tournament rules point system.

There is only one Golden Belt champion for each weight categories, with the openweight class champion being considered the strongest fighter in Myanmar. The openweight Golden Belt champion is the equivalent of being pound-for-pound champion in the world of Lethwei.

=== Tournament rules ===
In 1996, the Myanmar Traditional Lethwei Federation created the tournament ruleset for the inaugural Golden Belt Championship tournament. The two-minute injury timeout was removed and judges were added ringside to determine a winner in the event there was no knockout. This modified ruleset prevents the outcome of a draw and helped choose a winner to advance in the tournament. Myanmar's first international promotion, the World Lethwei Championship, opted for this ruleset in order to follow international safety regulations and have clear winners.

Judging criteria

The knockout is still highly desired under this ruleset, but in the event that a bout goes the distance, judges will present a decision. The 3 judges should score the bout based on:

- aggression
- damage
- amount of blood drawn
- number of significant strikes per round

Fighters have a maximum of 3 knockdowns per round and 4 knockdowns in the entire fight before the fight is ruled a knockout.

== Techniques ==
Aside from punches, kicks, elbows and knee attacks, Burmese fighters also make use of head-butts, raking knuckle strikes and take downs.

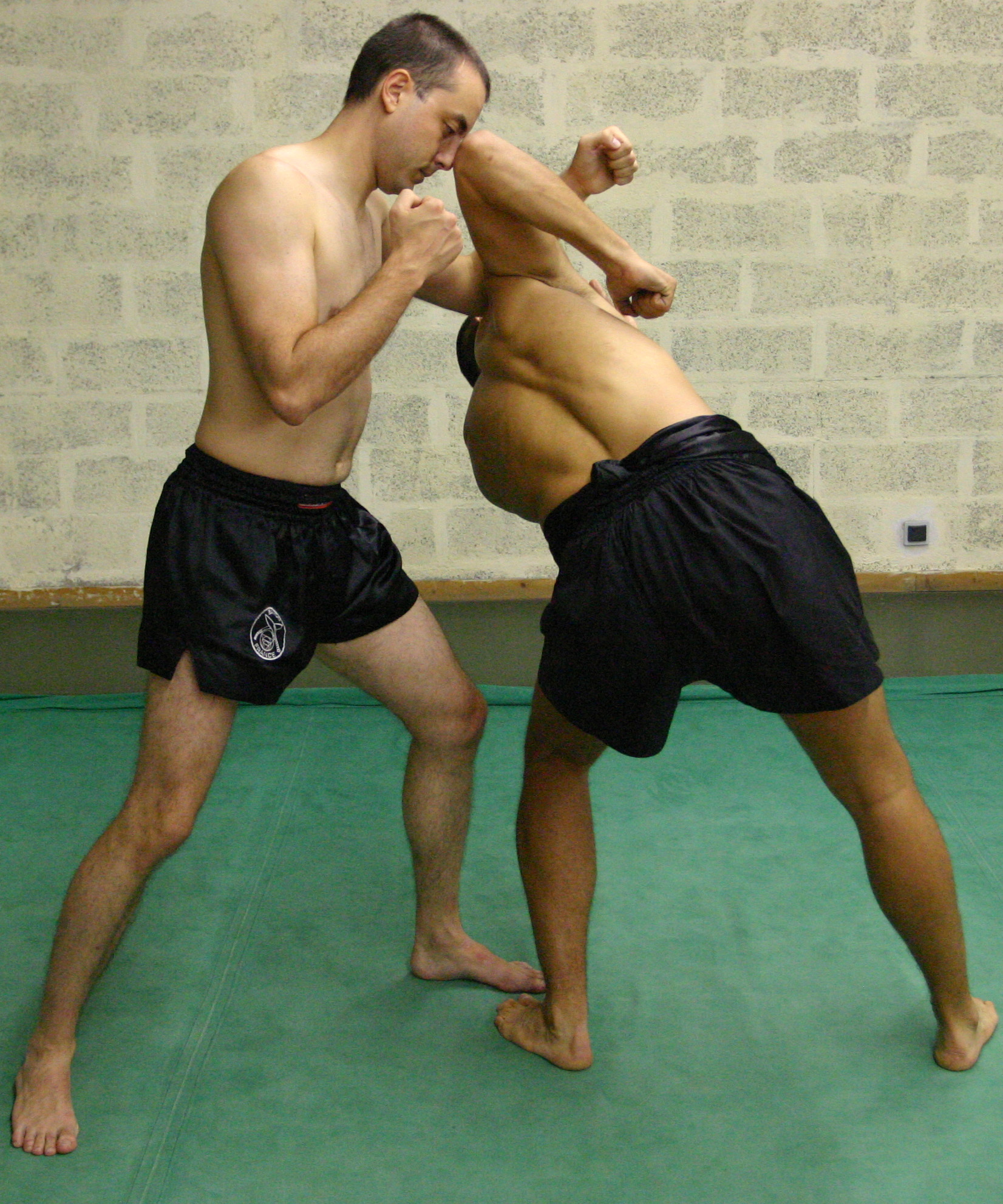
Spinning elbow strike

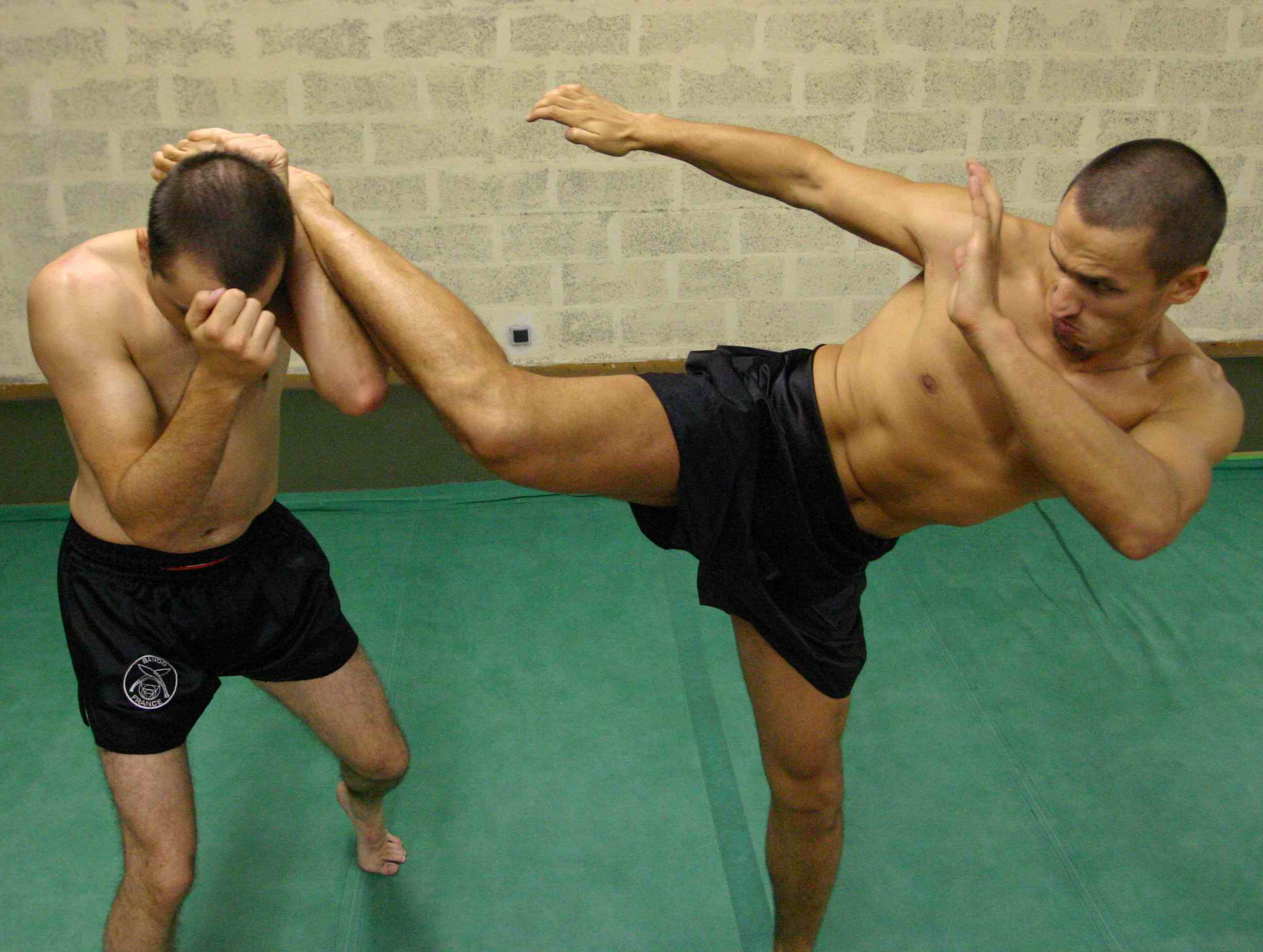
Roundhouse kick

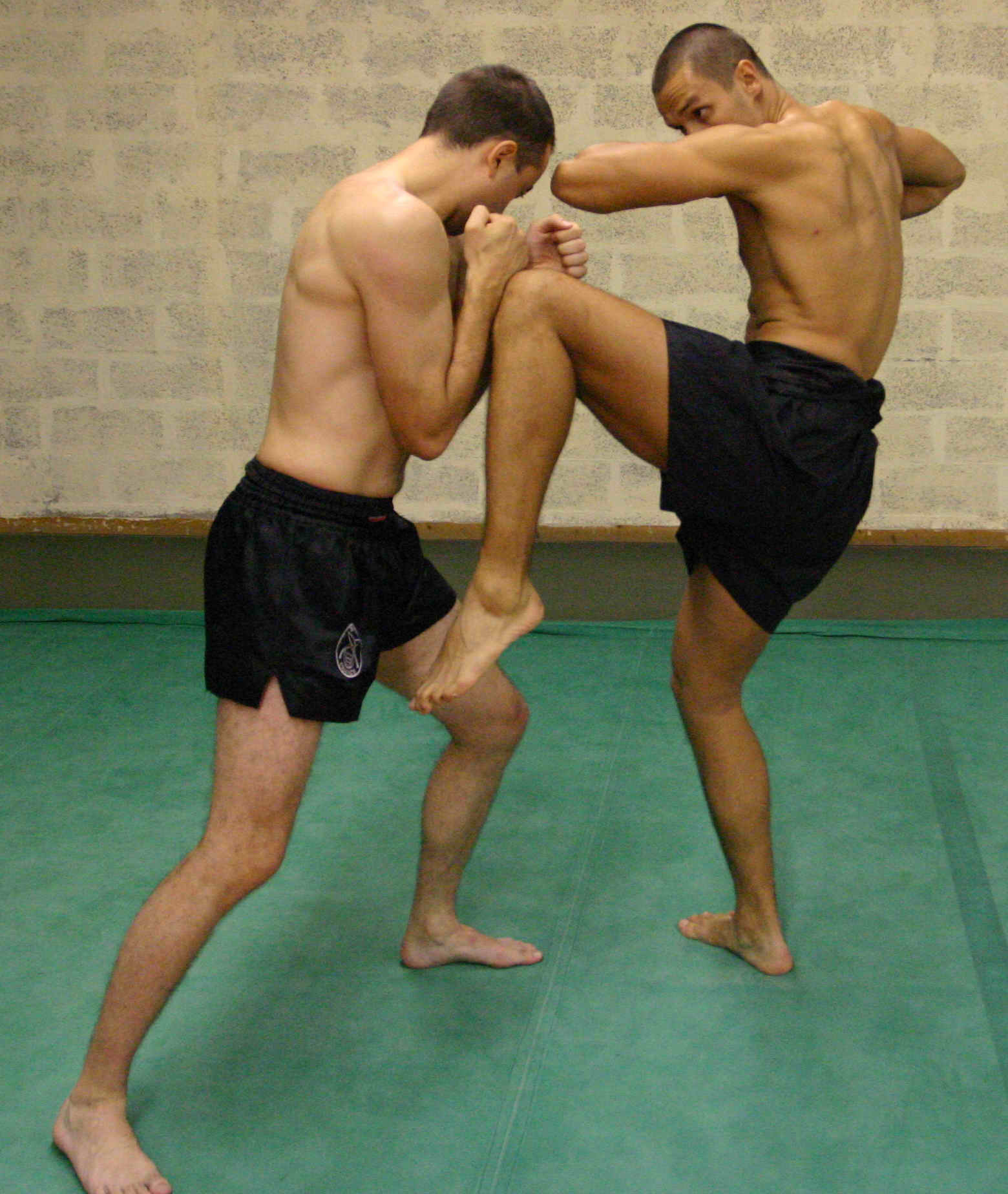
Knee and elbow strike

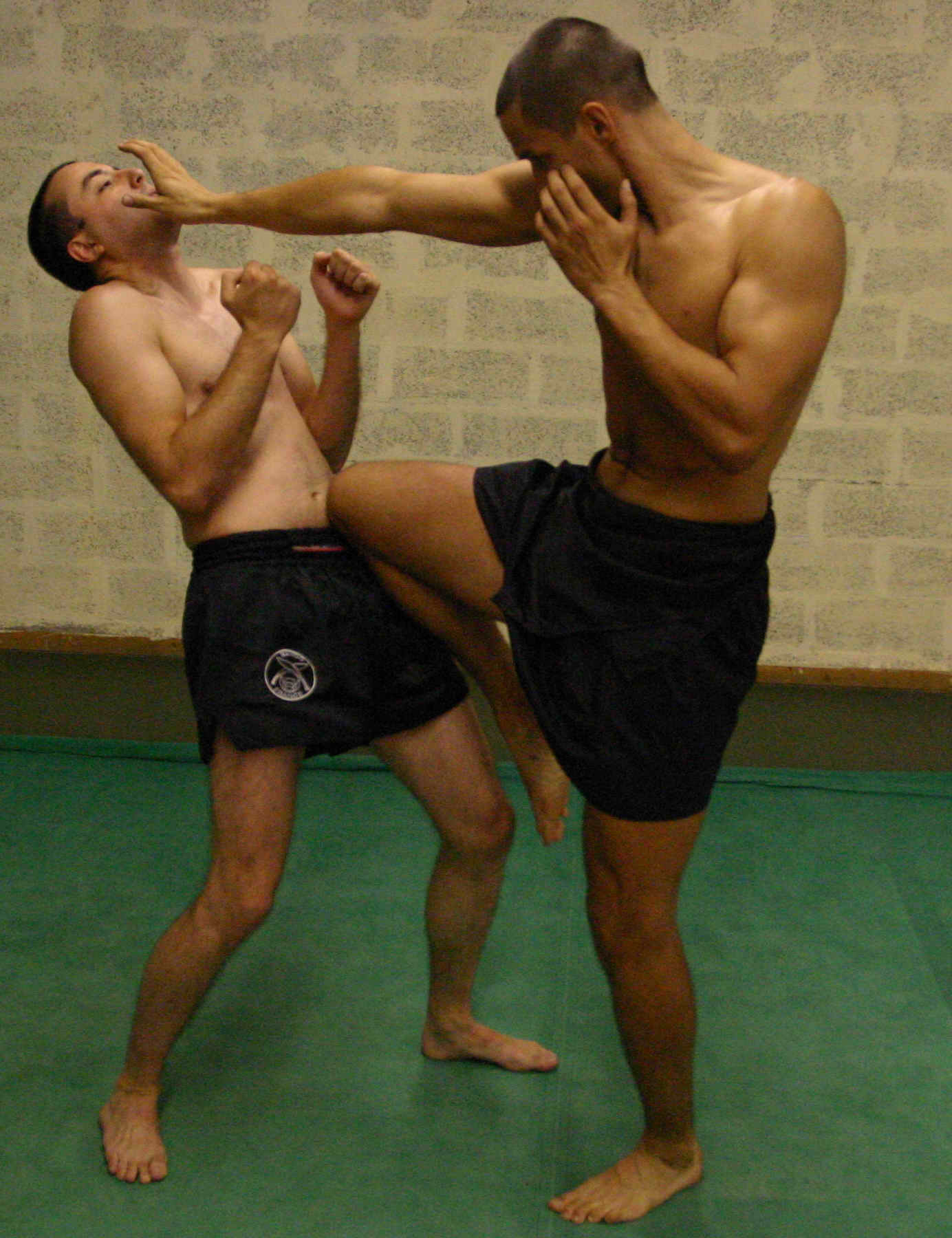
Knee and punch

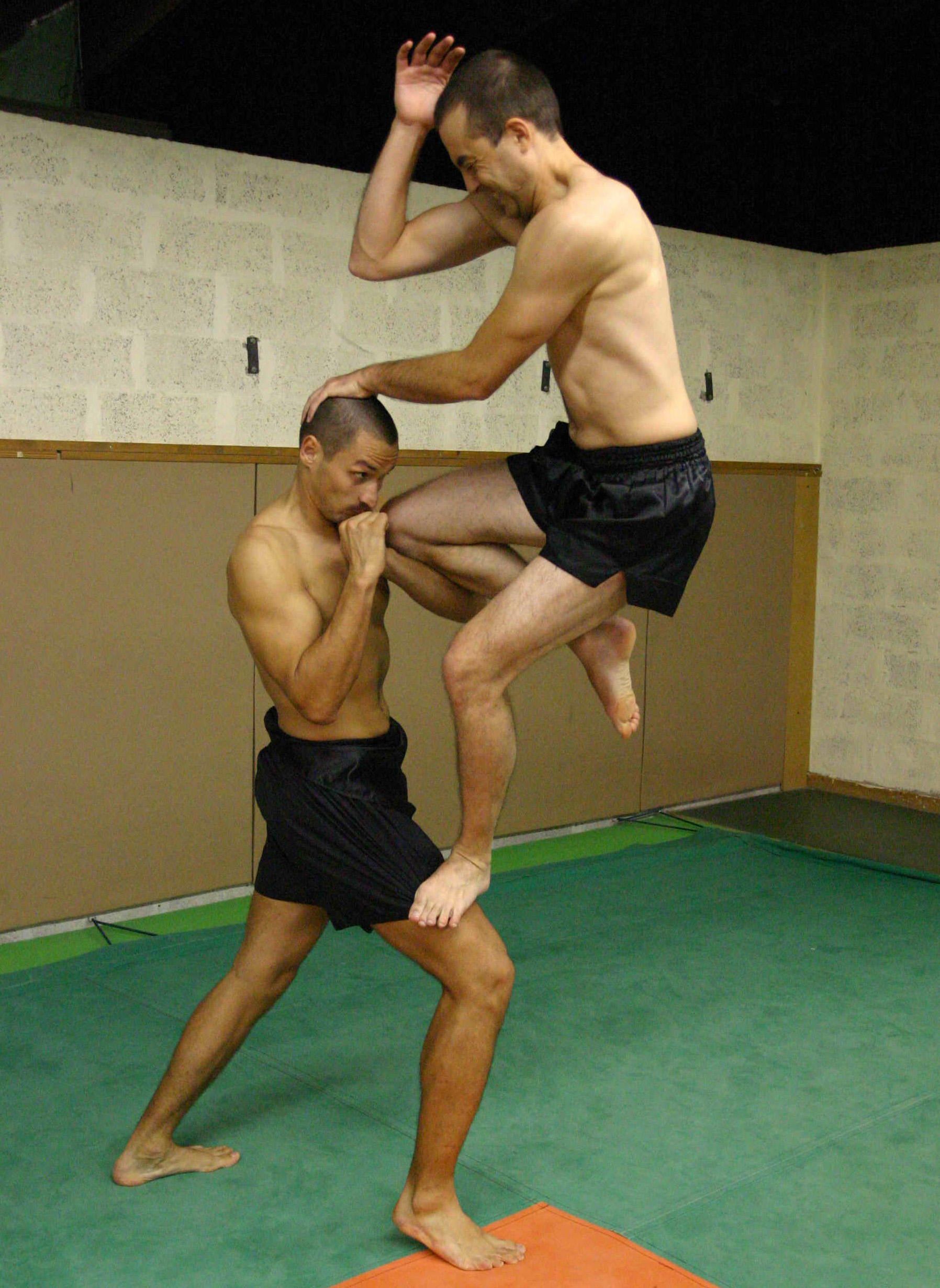
Jumping knee and elbow

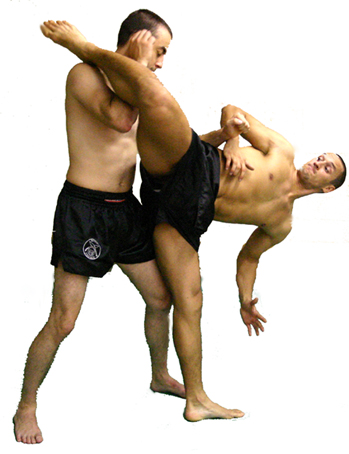
Back hook kick

=== Headbutt (Gowl Tite) ===
English	Burmese	Romanization	IPA
Thrusting/Forward Headbutt	ထိုးခေါင်းတိုက်	Htoe Gowl Tite	
Upward Headbutt	ခေါင်းပင့်တိုက်	Gowl Pint Tite	
Side Headbutt	ခေါင်းရိုက်	Gowl Yite	
Clinching Headbutt	ချုပ်ခေါင်းရိုက်	Choke Gowl Yite	
Flying/Diving Headbutt	ခုန်ခေါင်းတိုက်	Khnoe Gowl Tite	
Rushing Headbutt	ခေါင်းဆောင့်တိုက်	Gowl Sount Tite	
Downward Headbutt	ခေါင်းစိုက်တိုက်	Gowl Site Tite	

=== Punching (Let Thee) ===
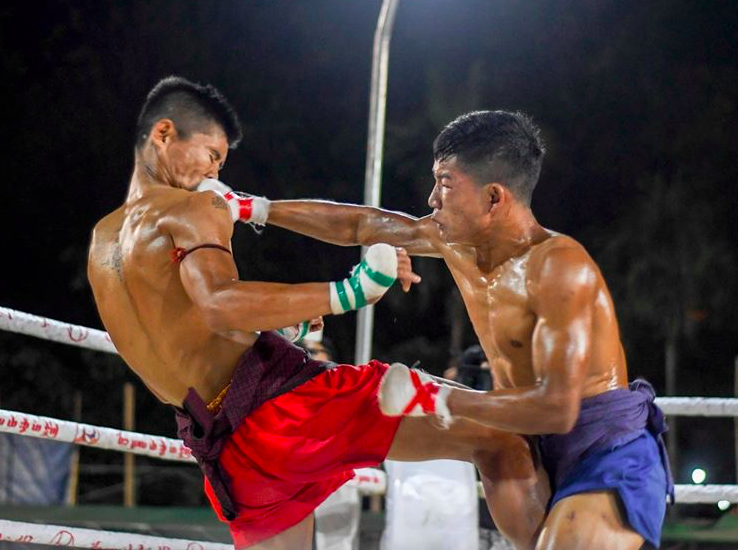
Lethwei fighters landing a punch

English	Burmese	Romanization	IPA
Jab	ထောက်လက်သီး	Htouk Let Thee	
Cross	ဖြောင့်လက်သီး	Fyount Let Thee	
Uppercut	ပင့်လက်သီး	Pint Let Thee	
Hook	ဝိုက်လက်သီး	Wide Let Thee	
Overhand (boxing)	စိုက်လက်သီး	Site Let Thee	
Backfist	တွက်လက်သီး	Twet Let Thee	
Spinning Backfist	လက်ပြန်ရိုက်	Let Pyan Yite	
Hammer fist	ပင့်လက်သီး	Pint Let Thee	
Superman punch	လက်သီးပျံ / ခုန်ထိုး လက်သီး	Let Thee Pyan / Khone Htoe Let Thee	

=== Elbow (Tel Daung) ===
The elbow can be used in several ways as a striking weapon: horizontal, diagonal-upwards, diagonal-downwards, uppercut, downward, backward-spinning and flying. They can be used as either a finishing move or as a way to cut the opponent's eyebrow to draw blood.

English	Burmese	Romanization	IPA
Horizontal Elbow	ဝိုက်တံတောင်	Wide Tel Daung	
Upward Elbow	ပင့်တံတောင်	Pint Tel Daung	
Downward Elbow	ထောင်းတံတောင်	Htoung Tel Daung	
Jumping Downward Elbow	တံတောင် ခုန်ထောင်း	Tel Daung Khone Htoung	
Elbow Thrust	ထိုးတံတောင်	Htoe Tel Daung	
Reverse Horizontal Elbow	တွက်တံတောင်	Twet Tel Daung	
Flying Elbow	တံတောင်ပျံ	Tel Daung Pyan	
Spinning Elbow	ပတ်တံတောင် / ခါးလှည့်တံတောင်	Pat Tel Daung / Khar Hlet Tel Daung	

Elbows can be used to great effect as blocks or defenses against, for example, spring knees, side body knees, body kicks or punches. When well connected, an elbow strike can cause serious damage to the opponent, including cuts or even a knockout.

=== Kicking (Kan) ===
English	Burmese	Romanization	IPA
Roundhouse Kick	ခြေဝိုက်ကန် / ဝိုက်ခတ်	Chay Wide Kan / Wide Khat	
Spinning back Kick	နောက်ပေါက်ကန်	Nout Pouk Kan	
Outside low kick	အပြင်ခတ်	Al Pyin Khat	
Inside low kick	အတွင်းခတ်	Al Twin Khat	
Hook kick	ချိတ်ကန်	Chate Kan	
Side kick	ခြေစောင်းကန်	Chay zoung Kan	
Axe Kick	ခုတ်ကန် / ပုဆိန်ပေါက်ကန်	Khote Kan / Pal Sain Pouk Kan	
Jump round Kick	ခုန်ဝိုက်ခတ်	Khone Wide Kan	
Step-Up Kick	ပေါင်နင်းကန်	Pound Nin Kan	

=== Knee (Doo) ===
English	Burmese	Romanization	IPA
Straight Knee Strike	တဲ့ထိုးဒူး	Delt Htoe Doo	
Spear Knee	လှံစိုက်ဒူ	Hlan Site Doo	
Side Knee Strike	ဝိုက်ဒူး	Wide Doo	
Upward Knee	ပင့်ဒူး	Pint Doo	
Downward Knee	ခုတ်ဒူး	Khote Doo	
Knee Slap	ရိုက်ဒူး	Yite Doo	
Double Flying Knee / Elephant Tusks flying Knee	စုံဒူးပျံ / ဆင်စွယ်ဒူးပျံ	Sone Doo Pyan / Sin Swal Doo Pyan	
Jumping Knee	ခုန်ဒူး	Khone Doo	
Step-Up Knee Strike	ပေါင်နင်းဒူး	Pound Nin Doo	

=== Foot-thrust ===
The foot-thrust is used as a defensive technique to control distance or block attacks and as a way to set up an attack. Foot-thrusts should be thrown quickly but with enough force to knock an opponent off balance.

English	Burmese	Romanization	IPA
Push Kick	နင်းခြေ / တားခြေ	Nin Chay / Tar Chay	
Toe Push Kick	ခြေဦးထိုးကန်	Chay Oo Htoe Kan	
Jumping Push Kick	ခုန်ဆောင့်ကန်	Khone Sount Kan	

Note - The Myanglish spelling and phonetics based spelling are two different things. The words used are phonetics based words which are more friendly and easy to pronounce for non-Myanmar speaking people. The phonetics wording is provided by Liger Paing from United Myanmar Bando Nation.

=== Weight classes ===
Weight class name	Upper limit			Gender
Weight class name	in pounds (lb)	in kilograms (kg)	in stone (st)	Gender
Light flyweight	105	48	7.6	Female
Flyweight	112	51	8	Male / female
Bantamweight	119	54	8.5	Male / female
Featherweight	126	57	9	Male / female
Lightweight	132	60	9.5	Male / female
Light welterweight	140	63.5	10	Male / female
Welterweight	148	67	10.5	Male
Light middleweight	157	71	11.1	Male
Middleweight	165	75	11.8	Male
Super middleweight	174	79	12.4	Male
Cruiserweight	183	83	13	Male

== Notable practitioners ==
- Kyar Ba Nyein
- Pyi Taw Pyan
- Bala Sein
- Phyu Gyi
- Kyaung Thar
- Moe Kyoe
- Tway Ma Shaung
- Tun Tun Min
- Too Too
- Saw Nga Man
- Lone Chaw
- Shwe Sai
- Soe Lin Oo
- Cyrus Washington
- Wan Chai
- Mite Yine
- Tun Lwin Moe

== See also ==
- List of Lethwei fighters
- Burmese martial arts
- Bando
- Banshay
- Naban
- Pongyi thaing
