= The Sun (Rangoon) =

The Sun သူရိယ သတင်းစာ
- Type: Daily newspaper
- Publisher: Ba Pe
- Founded: 4 July 1911
- Ceased publication: 14 October 1954
- Language: Burmese
- Headquarters: Yangon

The Sun (Burmese: သူရိယ သတင်းစာ; pronounced [θùɹḭja̰ ðədɪ́ɰ̃zà]) was a Burmese language newspaper published in Burma. "Thuriya" is a Burmanized form of Suriya, "sun" in Pali. Burmese nationalists began publishing the newspaper on 4 July 1911, during which The Sun was published thrice a week. In March 1915, due to its rising popularity, it became a daily, and was published until 14 October 1954. Its headquarters were in Yangon.
