= Maung Ba =

Burmese politician (1873–1937)

Sir Maung Ba, KSM (25 February 1873 – 4 June 1937) was a judge and political figure in British Burma.

Educated at Rangoon College, Maung Ba practiced as a lawyer before he entered government service in 1898. He was appointed district and sessions judge in December 1922, additional judge of the High Court of Judicature at Rangoon in March 1925, judge of the High Court of Judicature at Rangoon in July 1926, and member of the Executive Council of the Governor of Burma in January 1932, serving as Home Member in succession to Sir Joseph Augustus Maung Gyi. He retired in 1937 and was appointed by the Governor to the Senate of Burma.

He was also Vice-Chancellor of Rangoon University in 1928 and 1931 and the chairman of the Burma Research Society.

He received the Kyet thaye zaung shwe Salwe ya Min (KSM) in 1920 and was knighted in 1934.
