= Hpa-an Township =

Coordinates: 16.8833°N 97.6333°E

Hpa-an Township ဘားအံမြို့နယ် ဖၣ်အၣ်ကီၢ်ဆၣ် ထိုအင်ကၞင့်
- Township
- Location in Hpa-an district (red)
- Country: Myanmar
- Division: Kayin State
- District: Hpa-an District

Area
  - Total: 1,119 sq mi (2,899 km^{2})

Population (2014)
  - Total: 421,575
  - Density: 376.6/sq mi (145.4/km^{2})
- Time zone: UTC+6:30 (MMT)

Hpa-an Township (Phlone ထ်ုအင်ကၞင့်; Burmese: ဘားအံမြို့နယ်, S'gaw Karen: ဖၣ်အၣ်ကီၢ်ဆၣ်) is a township of Hpa-an District in the Kayin State of Myanmar. The principal town is Hpa-An.

In 2014, the township had 421,575 people.
