= Dave Leduc vs. Prom Samnang =

- Date: November 5, 2023
- Venue: Town Arena at Chip Mong 271 Megamall, Phnom Penh, Cambodia
- Title(s) on the line: No official titles on the line

Tale of the tape
Boxer	(Myanmar) Dave Leduc	(Cambodia) Prom Samnang
Hometown	Quebec, Canada	Phnom Penh, Cambodia
Age	31 years, 10 months	36 years, 1 month
Height	1.88 m (6 ft 2 in)	1.85 m (6 ft 1 in)
Weight	79 kg (174 lb)	79 kg (174 lb)
Style	Lethwei	Kun Khmer
Recognition	6-time Lethwei World Champion; Openweight Golden Belt Champion	Multiple time Kun Khmer Champion; THAI Fight Champion; 2023 SEA Games Gold Medalist

Result
- Draw; Single 9-minute round under Kun Khmer rules. Leduc knocked down Samnang; Match declared draw.

Dave Leduc vs. Prom Samnang was a highly anticipated Kun Khmer bout held on November 5, 2023, in Phnom Penh, Cambodia between Canadian-Burmese Lethwei champion Dave Leduc and Cambodian Kun Khmer champion Prom Samnang. The match was referred as historic by The Phnom Penh Post, as well as the biggest historical Kun khmer event and the most anticipated fight of the year. The event was notable for its cultural significance and wide viewership of over 15 million people. His Excellency Prime Minister of Cambodia, Hun Manet stated that this match contributed to strengthen the ties of friendship between Cambodia and Myanmar.

== Background ==
In early 2023, the World Lethwei Federation proposed a match between Dave Leduc and Prom Samnang, recognizing Samnang's impressive winning streak in Kun Khmer and agreed for Samnang to challenge Dave Leduc for the openweight Lethwei World Championship. The bout was initially scheduled for May 27, 2023, in Banská Bystrica, Slovakia, at the occasion of MFC 2, but was canceled due to Samnang being denied a Schengen visa to enter Slovakia. "I still do not know when this match will take place, and I do not yet know if it will be fought under the rules or Lethwei or Kun Khmer. My preparation will be very different depending on the rules. Lethwei is fought with bare knuckles and the use of headbutts is allowed." Samnang said. In August 2023, Leduc announced his intention to retire after one final fight in Cambodia and compete under Kun Khmer rules with hands wrapped in traditional ropes rather than under Lethwei rules. He extended an invitation to Prime Minister Hun Manet to attend the match, which was accepted.

Leading up to the rescheduled fight, the Kun Khmer Federation hired 10 assistant coaches to help Samnang in his preparation against Leduc.

Social media played a significant role in building anticipation. On April 27, 2023, Leduc posted a video on Facebook cracking open a coconut with his head where Samnang was seen imitating Leduc and included a montage of Cambodian individuals performing the same act. The video garnered over 9 million views. The bout was described by local Kun Khmer gym owner and coach Sov Men as “The fight of the century”.

On November 2, upon his arrival at Phnom Penh International Airport, Leduc was greeted by a heavy media presence and screamed “Prom Samnang, where are you?" when exiting the airport.

On November 3, two days prior to the fight, Samnang and Leduc were invited to the Peace Palace in Phnom Penh to meet with His Excellency Prime Minister of Cambodia Dr. Hun Manet. Manet said that the match between the two men will reflect mutual respect and contribute to strengthen the ties of friendship between Cambodia and Myanmar. The match will also raise awareness about Kun Khmer around the world the Cambodian Premier added. The match represented the meeting two of different cultures and martial arts tradition.

== Fight Details ==
On November 5, 2023, the event took place at Town Arena at Chip Mong 271 Megamall in Phnom Penh, Cambodia. The bout was fought under modified Kun Khmer rules, consisting of one nine-minute round with traditional Cambodian hand wraps "raw yarn" instead of gloves and no the fight was knockout only to win, no decision by judges. Victory could only be achieved by knockout. The event was co-promoted by MAS Fight and Martial Fighting Championship and the english broadcasting team was Chris Garrido and Andrew Whitelaw.

Leduc landed a powerful right hand punch flooring Samnnang in the first minutes of the match. Leduc dominated with significant strikes, including a knockdown, but Samnang survived the match. After nine minutes without a knockout, per MAS Fight rules, the fight was automatically declared a draw. After the match, Leduc raised the flags of Myanmar and Cambodia as a gesture of unity.

== Viewership and Aftermath ==
The match attracted a significant viewership and was streamed online by over 15 million people and a live audience of tens of thousands of fans. In an interview with Fresh News Asia, Leduc said: "I felt warmly welcomed in Cambodia. Everyone is friendly and kind." Leduc also highlighted the warm hospitality of the Cambodian people, adding that he considered Cambodia as his second home. Shortly after the event, Leduc relocated with his family to Cambodia.

== See also ==
- Dave Leduc vs. Tun Tun Min III
- Kun Khmer

Preceded by vs. Cyrus Washington	Dave Leduc's bouts November 5, 2023	Succeeded by N/A
Preceded by vs. Vladyslav Ermolaev	Prom Samnang's bouts November 5, 2023	Succeeded by vs. Jordin Henwood
