= Muay Lao =

Martial art

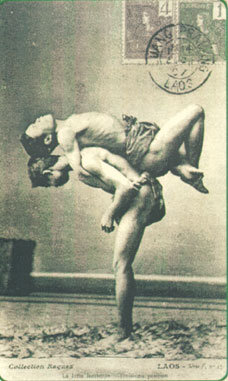
- Muay Lao boxers training during the colonial period
- Also known as: Lao Boxing, Lao Kickboxing
- Focus: Striking, Clinching
- Hardness: Full contact
- Country of origin: Laos
- Famous practitioners: Soukna Keotalat, Atthaxay Sihabut, Subin Chandanaed
- Olympic sport: No

Muay Lao (Lao: ມວຍລາວ, lit. "Lao boxing") is a combat sport from Laos based on ancient Lao martial arts. It incorporates punches, kicks, elbow, and knee strikes. The sport can be traced back to the 15th century, when it was used for military combat during the Lan Xang dynasty. It is similar to Muay Thai from Thailand and Pradal Serey from Cambodia. Muay Lao was included as an event at the 2009 Southeast Asian Games in Vientiane.

The bouts consist of five rounds, and each round is three minutes.

The martial art is related to other forms of martial arts, including Pradal Serey in Cambodia and Muay Thai in Thailand.

== Recent history ==
Muay Lao is enjoying revival in part due to the actions of the Lao Sports Association.

Three Lao boxers reached the gold medal match at the 32nd SEA Games.

== Traditional style ==
The traditional style is called Muay Lai Lao. Lao boxing comes from an ancient boxing style known as "Mas Lak Hang". The martial art used to be performed at different festivals, such as the fireworks festival. People referred to this martial art in ancient times as "tiger tail boxing".

== Technique ==
The roundhouse kicks emphasize rotation of the kicking foot and rising onto the toes of the base foot to generate power. Practitioners rotate the hip and glute so the kicking leg travels parallel to the ground and strikes at a near‑perpendicular angle, delivering impact with the shin rather than lifting upward as in Tae Kwon Do. The cross‑arm defense positions the non‑kicking arm wrapped across the face to provide protection and additional stability during the kick.

== See also ==
- Lethwei
- Pradal Serey
- Kickboxing
- Sanda
- Bokator
