= Prom Samnang =

Cambodian Kun Khmer fighter (born 1987)

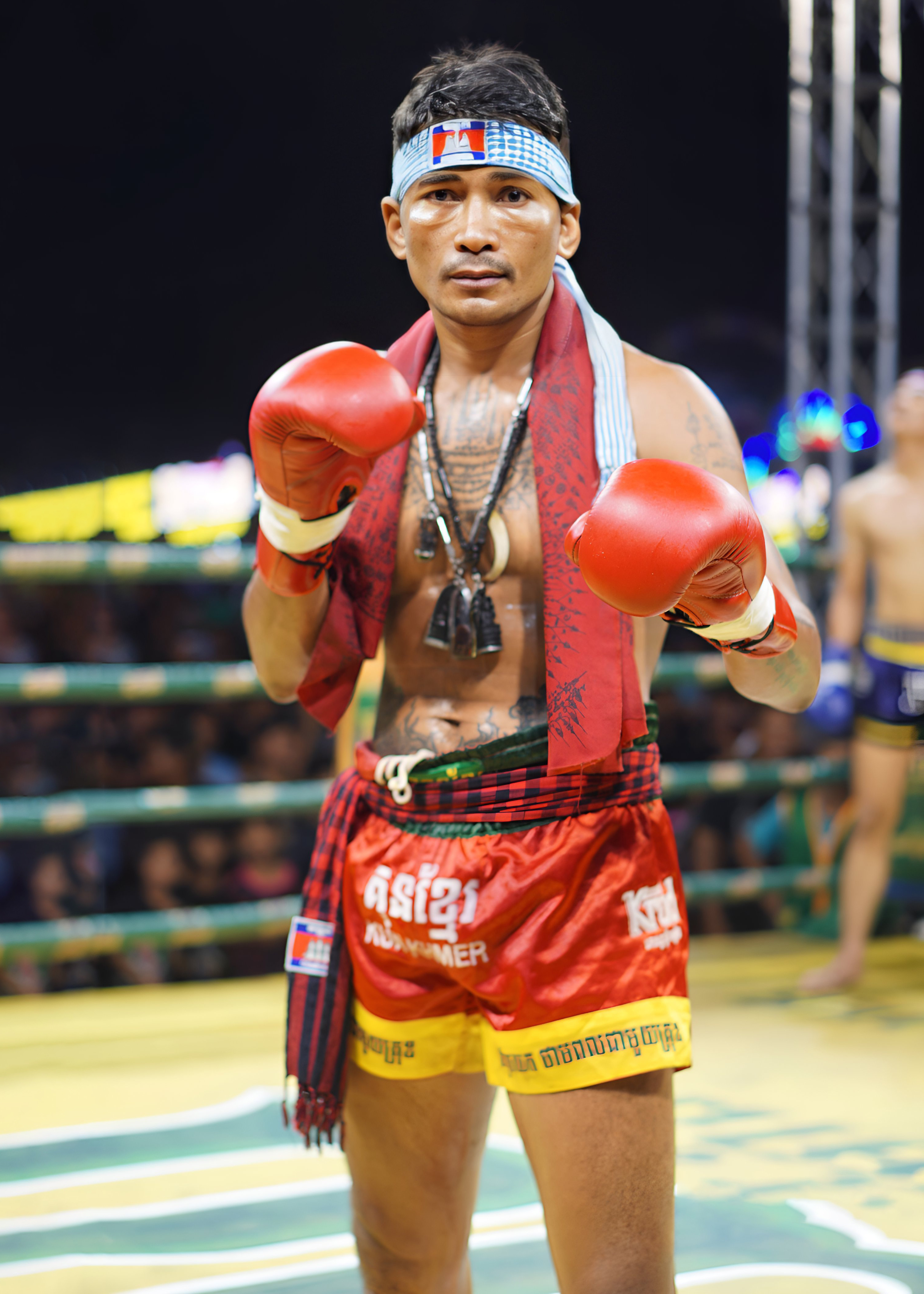
- Born: September 9, 1987 (age 39); Krang Chek village, Phnom Sruoch District, Kampong Speu province, Cambodia
- Nickname: The Barber; Cheng Kat Sok Day Ek; Cheng Kat Sok Kan Tray Meas; Rum Samnang
- Height: 1.85 m (6 ft 1 in)
- Weight: 81 kg (179 lb; 12 st 11 lb)
- Style: Kun Khmer; Kun Bokator
- Team: 911 Parachute Battalion Club Kong Chak Reachasey Mean Reuk
- Trainer: Hong Seoun; Sen Bunthen
- Years active: 2010–present

Kickboxing record
- Total: 159
- Wins: 144
- By knockout: 70
- Losses: 12
- Draws: 3

Prom Samnang (Khmer: ព្រំ សំណាង; born September 9, 1987) is a Cambodian Kun Khmer fighter. He is widely considered the most successful Kun Khmer fighters in history. In 2023, Samnang won the Thai Fight Kard Chuek championship title in Thailand, won the gold medal for his country at the SEA Games in the Khun Khmer Men's 81kg division and faced Dave Leduc in the biggest fight in Cambodia's history watched live by over 15 million people.

== Personal life ==
Samnang is known by sports fans by nickname Cheang Kat Sok Day Ek meaning "The Barber" because, in addition to competing in the ring, also works as a barber at a popular barbershop in Phnom Penh. In 2023, Prom Samnang signed onto a two-year contract as a singer with Bong Plerng Media.

== Career ==
On April 15, 2023, Samnang faced Thai martial arts superstar Sudsakorn Sor Klinmee under Kun Khmer rules in Cambodia and won by unanimous decision. The match took place in Siem Reap in front of the Sokha Hotel as Cambodians celebrated the second night of the traditional New Year.

On July 16, 2003, Prom Samnang defeated Belarusian fighter, Nikita (Нитита), at the 77 kg weight class to win the Techo Santepheap Kun Khmer World Championship belt. 500,000 viewers watched the live stream of the event. Prom Samnang made Kampuchea Thmey Daily's top 10 list of Khmer boxers who had the best first half of 2023. On December 23, 2023, Samnang won over American fighter Harry Lopez via TKO in the third round.

=== Thai Fight ===
On February 5, 2023, Samnang faced former International Boxing Federation (IBF) Muay Thai champion and Max Muay Thai champion, Thomas Carpenter from England. Samnang won by TKO and was awarded the Thai Fight Kard Chuek championship title.

21 days later, on February 26 of the same year, Prom Samnang defeated Russian kickboxer Firdavszhon Naiimov (Фирдавсжон Наиймов) on the Thai Fight stage in a first-round knockout in under two minutes.

=== SEA Games ===
In 2021, Samnang competed in the SEA Games in Vietnam where he won bronze medal. After returning from Vietnam, Samnang has remained undefeated with many knock outs.

Two years later, in 2023, Southeast Asian Games were held in Cambodia. For the selection of the National Kun Khmer team in the 81 kg weight category, the Cambodian sports federation had the choice of between Keo Rumchong or Prom Samnang and ultimately selected Samnang. Samnang was the flag bearer for Cambodia at the opening ceremony He won the gold medal by defeating Tun Tun Min from Myanmar in the Men's Khun Khmer 81kg weight class. For winning the gold medal, Samnang was awarded a house by the sports energy drink company Boostrong.

=== Leduc vs. Samnang ===
In 2023, the World Lethwei Federation agreed for Samnang to challenge Dave Leduc for the openweight Lethwei World Championship because of his winning streak in Kun Khmer. The match was scheduled to take place on May 27, 2023, in Banská Bystrica, but was cancelled because Samnang was denied a Schengen visa to enter Slovakia. "I still do not know when this match will take place, and I do not yet know if it will be fought under the rules or Lethwei or Kun Khmer. My preparation will be very different depending on the rules - Lethwei is fought with bare knuckles and the use of headbutts is allowed." Samnang said.

On November 3, 2023, two days prior to the fight, Samnang and Leduc were invited to the Peace Palace in Phnom Penh to meet with His Excellency Prime Minister of Cambodia Dr. Hun Manet. Manet said that the match between the two men will reflect mutual respect and contribute to strengthen the ties of friendship between Cambodia and Myanmar. The match will also raise awareness about Kun Khmer around the world the Cambodian Premier added. The match represented the meeting two of different cultures and martial arts tradition.

The Kun Khmer Federation (KKF) hired 10 assistant coaches to help Samnang in his preparation against Leduc. The match was referred as historic by The Phnom Penh Post as well as the most anticipated fight of the year.

On November 5, 2023, Samnang faced Leduc under Kun Khmer rules (1 round of 9 minutes) in Phnom Penh, Cambodia. Leduc landed a powerful right hand punch flooring Samnnang in the first minutes of the match. After nine minutes without a knockout, per MAS Fight rules, the fight was automatically declared a draw. The event was watched live by over 15 million people.

=== 2024 ===
On June 27, Samnang defeated French Muay Thai fighter, former ISKA Champion Reda Oudgou in Paris, France at Kun Khmer Super Fight 3: Paris.

On July 13, he defeated Muay Thai WBC, ISKA, and WMO world champion Jack Maguire from UK by KO in the 1st round.

On August 10, Prom Samnang avenged his loss to ONE Championship Muay Thai fighter Lucas Gabriel. Samnang won by unanimous decision and claimed the World Kun Khmer Xtreme title.

On November 9, Cambodian Independence Day, Prom Samnang faced Thai Fight champion and Buakaw Banchamek's student Moeung Sab Banchamak, defeating him by unanimous decision and maintaining his winning streak.

On November 13, Samnang rematched with Arvin Mehboudi, and defeated the latter by unanimous decision.

== Championships and accomplishments ==
Kun Khmer

- 2017 KIF International Khmer Martial Arts Belt
- 2023 Krud Kun Khmer 78 kg World Championship
- 2023 Techo Santepheap Kun Khmer World Championship
- 2024 KKF International Kun Khmer Champion Belt
- 🥇 2023 SEA Games Kun Khmer Men's 81 kg - Gold medal
- 🥇 Gold Medal - National Kun Khmer Federation

Muay Thai

- Thai Fight Kard Chuek 78 kg Championship belt
- 🥉 2021 SEA Games Muay Men's 81 kg - Bronze medal

== Kun Khmer record ==
Professional Kun Khmer record
Total fights 175, 159 wins (70 (T)KOs), 7 losses, 3 draws
Date	Result	Opponent	Event	Location	Method	Round	Time
July 11, 2026	Loss	(Algeria) Ayoub Bahri	Kun Khmer on Bayon TV	Phnom Penh, Cambodia	Decision	3	3:00
June 29, 2025	Win	(Angola) Dyson Sapalo	Kun Khmer Dazz 8H	Phnom Penh, Cambodia	Decision	3	3:00
June 8, 2025	Win	(Iran) Hossein Jafarzadeh	Kun Khmer Dazz 8H	Phnom Penh, Cambodia	TKO	2	3:00
May 23, 2025	Win	(Vietnam) Pham Tam Vang	Kickboxing SEA Warriors	Ho Chi Minh, Vietnam	Decision	3	3:00
January 19, 2025	Win	(Vietnam) Troung Quoc Huing	Kun Khmer Championship 19	Phnom Penh, Cambodia	KO	3	3:00
November 13, 2024	Win	(Iran) Arvin Mehboudi	Kun Khmer vs Muay Thai Iran	Phnom Penh, Cambodia	Decision	3	3:00
November 9, 2024	Win	(Thailand) Moeung Sab Banchamek	Hanuman Kun Khmer	Phnom Penh, Cambodia	Decision	3	3:00
September 7, 2024	Win	(Turkey) Emirhan Recep	Wurkz Kun Khmer	Phnom Penh, Cambodia	KO	2	3:00
September 1, 2024	Win	(Iran) Yousef Hematisanghili	Wurkz Kun Khmer	Phnom Penh, Cambodia	KO	2	3:00
August 10, 2024	Win	(Brazil) Lucas Gabriel	Xtreme Kun Khmer: Samnang vs Gabriel II	Phnom Penh, Cambodia	Decision	3	3:00
July 13, 2024	Win	(United Kingdom) Jack Maguire	Xtreme Kun Khmer	Phnom Penh, Cambodia	KO	1	1:00
June 27, 2024	Win	(France) Reda Oudgou	Kun Khmer Super Fight 3: Paris	Paris, France	Decision	3	3:00
May 28, 2024	Win	(Russia) Konstantin	Ganzberg Kun Khmer	Phnom Penh, Cambodia	Decision	3	3:00
May 18, 2024	Win	(Iran) Mehdi Kalili	TV5 Kun Khmer	Phnom Penh, Cambodia	KO	2	1:00
April 24, 2024	Loss	(Brazil) Lucas Gabriel	Kubota King of Fighter	Phnom Penh, Cambodia	Decision	3	3:00
March 23, 2024	Win	(Iran) Keivan Soleimani	TV5 Kun Khmer	Phnom Penh, Cambodia	Decision	3	3:00
February 29, 2024	Win	(Myanmar) Tun Tun Min	Kun Khmer Asean Championship	Phnom Penh, Cambodia	Decision	3	3:00
February 17, 2024	Win	(Thailand) Moeurn A Khom Venum Muay thai	TVK Kunkhmer	Phnom Penh, Cambodia	KO	1	0:30
February 9, 2024	Win	(Myanmar) Shwe Yar Man	Boostrong King of The Ring Kun Khmer	Phnom Penh, Cambodia	TKO	2	2:00
December 23, 2023	Win	(United States) Harry Lopez	KKIF Kun Khmer Friendly	Phnom Penh, Cambodia	TKO	3	3:00
December 14, 2023	Win	(Canada) Jordin Henwood	Boostrong Kun Khmer Championship	Phnom Penh, Cambodia	Decision	3	3:00
November 5, 2023	Draw	(Myanmar) Dave Leduc	Dave Leduc vs. Prom Samnang	Phnom Penh, Cambodia	Time Limit	1	9:00
Cambodia-Myanmar Friendship fight
October 11, 2023	Win	(Ukraine) Vladyslav Ermolaev	Boostrong Kun Khmer Championship	Phnom Penh, Cambodia	Decision	3	3:00
September 30, 2023	Loss	(United States) Paul Banasiak	Wurkz Kun Khmer Championship	Phnom Penh, Cambodia	Decision	3	3:00
September 3, 2023	Win	(Thailand) Dabmorn Pumpanmuang	Krud Kun Khmer Championship	Phnom Penh, Cambodia	Decision	3	3:00
August 13, 2023	Win	(Russia) Firdavszhon Naiimov	Town Boxing Arena	Phnom Penh, Cambodia	KO	2	0:35
July 16, 2023	Win	(Belarus) Nikita Gerasisimovich	Town Boxing Arena	Phnom Penh, Cambodia	Decision	3	3:00
July 2, 2023	Win	(New Zealand) Daniel James	Town Boxing Arena	Phnom Penh, Cambodia	KO	3	1:28
June 5, 2023	Win	(Russia) Masoud Moghimian	N.N.P. Kun Khmer	Phnom Penh, Cambodia	Decision	3	3:00
May 11, 2023	Win	(Myanmar) Tun Tun Min	2023 Southeast Asian Games	Phnom Penh, Cambodia	Decision	3	3:00
Wins the Gold medal in 2023 SEA Games Kun Khmer Men's 81 kg
April 15, 2023	Win	(Thailand) Sudsakorn Sor Klinmee	Krud Kun Khmer Championship	Siem Reap, Cambodia	Decision	3	3:00
April 6, 2023	Win	(Iran) Arvin Mehboudi	N.N.P. Kun Khmer	Phnom Penh, Cambodia	Decision	3	3:00
March 25, 2023	Win	(Russia) Vladimir Khabao	International friendship battle - Wurkz	Phnom Penh, Cambodia	Decision	3	3:00
March 11, 2023	Win	(Thailand) Prakaisaeng	Town	Phnom Penh, Cambodia	KO	1	0:35
March 9, 2023	Win	(Cambodia) Heng Vichhai	Wurkz - Town Boxing Arena	Phnom Penh, Cambodia	TKO	1	2:22
February 11, 2023	Win	(Thailand) Singnum	International friendship battle - Krud	Phnom Penh, Cambodia	KO	2	1:55
January 21, 2023	Win	(Thailand) Pon Sit Munchai	International friendship battle - Wurkz	Phnom Penh, Cambodia	KO	1	2:50
December 31, 2022	Win	(Thailand) Sammy Banchamek	International friendship battle - Krud	Phnom Penh, Cambodia	KO	2	2:15
December 24, 2022	Win	(United States) Gilbert	International friendship battle - Wurkz	Phnom Penh, Cambodia	KO	2	2:25
December 1, 2022	Win	(Thailand) Samingdong Sor Chatree	TVK Fighter	Phnom Penh, Cambodia	KO	1	0:06
October 16, 2022	Win	(Thailand) Dankaosan	TV5 Boxing	Phnom Penh, Cambodia	KO	1	1:12
August 18, 2022	Win	(Thailand) Pekhakchai	TVK Fighter	Phnom Penh, Cambodia	KO	1	
August 6, 2022	Win	(Thailand) Prakaisaeng	Bayon TV	Phnom Penh, Cambodia	Decision	5	
July 24, 2022	Win	(Thailand) Saenmuang	Town	Phnom Penh, Cambodia	TKO	2	0:45
October 2, 2021	Win	(Cambodia) Thoeun Theara	CNC Boxing	Phnom Penh, Cambodia	Decision	5	3:00
September 18, 2021	Win	(Cambodia) Chhoeung Lvay	Bayon TV	Phnom Penh, Cambodia	KO	2	0:52
August 29, 2021	Win	(Cambodia) Long Sovandouen	MAS Fight Cambodia-Town Boxing Arena	Phnom Penh, Cambodia	KO	1	3:25
January 19, 2020	Win	(Thailand) Pheathorngthong	Ek Phnom Arena	Battambang, Cambodia	KO	3	
January 12, 2020	Draw	(New Zealand) Tommy Gunn	MAS Fight	Phnom Penh, Cambodia	Time Limit	1	9:00
January 4, 2020	Win	(Switzerland) Gilgor Stojanov	CTN Boxing	Phnom Penh, Cambodia	TKO	3	1:36
December 22, 2019	Win	(Iran) Sa Ber	SEA TV Boxing	Phnom Penh, Cambodia	Decision	5	3:00
November 3, 2019	Win	(Thailand) Chhan Chhai Keathavorn	TV5 Boxing	Phnom Penh, Cambodia	Decision	3	3:00
September 14, 2019	Win	(Brazil) Pereira	CNC Boxing	Phnom Penh, Cambodia	KO	2	2:02
August 25, 2019	Win	(Thailand) Pit Padin	PNN Boxing	Phnom Penh, Cambodia	KO	2	2:20
August 17, 2019	Win	(Thailand) Khong Kor	Bayon TV	Phnom Penh, Cambodia	TKO	2	0:04
June 29, 2019	Win	(Brazil) Paulo Sergio	CNC Boxing	Phnom Penh, Cambodia	KO	2	0:25
March 31, 2019	Loss	(Uzbekistan) Mansurbek Tolipov	CTN Boxing	Phnom Penh, Cambodia	Decision	5	3:00
March 23, 2019	Win	(Morocco) Ouach Nabil	CNC Boxing	Phnom Penh, Cambodia	KO	5	2:50
February 16, 2019	Win	(Uzbekistan) Mansurbek Tolipov	CNC Boxing	Phnom Penh, Cambodia	Decision	5	3:00
February 9, 2019	Win	(Thailand) Manawan	TV5 Boxing	Phnom Penh, Cambodia	TKO	4	0:15
February 2, 2019	Win	(Thailand) Rajasing	CNC Boxing	Phnom Penh, Cambodia	KO	2	2:12
January 19, 2019	Win	(Thailand) Yaklong	CNC Boxing	Phnom Penh, Cambodia	TKO	3	1:30
November 25, 2018	Win	(Thailand) Korng Kor Keimthakrai	CNC Boxing	Phnom Penh, Cambodia	KO	2	2:55
November 17, 2018	Win	(Thailand) Rungnakchai	CNC Boxing	Phnom Penh, Cambodia	KO	1	0:43
October 27, 2018	Win	(Thailand) Phetsanan	CTN Boxing	Phnom Penh, Cambodia	KO	2	0:01
August 19, 2018	Win	(Thailand) Phnomeb	CNC Boxing	Phnom Penh, Cambodia	Decision	5	3:00
May 13, 2018	Win	(Thailand) Khorngfak	CNC Boxing	Phnom Penh, Cambodia	KO	3	2:06
April 29, 2018	Win	(Thailand) Phetarun	CNC Boxing	Phnom Penh, Cambodia	Decision	3	3:00
April 8, 2018	Win	(Thailand) Veitann	CNC Boxing	Phnom Penh, Cambodia	KO	1	
March 30, 2018	Win	(Thailand) Chalermdet Sor.Tawanrung	Bayon TV	Phnom Penh, Cambodia	TKO	2	0:50
March 17, 2018	Win	(Thailand) Petch Bopha	SEA TV Boxing	Phnom Penh, Cambodia	TKO	4	0:20
February 10, 2018	Win	(Thailand) Nom Sayam	TV5 Boxing	Phnom Penh, Cambodia	KO	2	0:22
November 5, 2017	Win	(Thailand) Chai Yo	PNN TV Boxing	Phnom Penh, Cambodia	KO	1	1:00
September 3, 2017	Win	(Thailand) Singyai	SEATV Boxing	Phnom Penh, Cambodia	KO	2	1:18
August 5, 2017	Win	(Thailand) Kongjak Por.Pao-In	SEATV Boxing	Phnom Penh, Cambodia	Decision	5	3:00
March 25, 2017	Win	(Thailand) Nakrob Dam	SEATV boxing	Phnom Penh, Cambodia	KO	3	0:48
November 27, 2016	Win	(Thailand) Diesellek TopkingBoxing	World Kun Khmer Event	Phnom Penh, Cambodia	Decision	5	3:00
September 4, 2016	Win	(Thailand) Sam Kor	SEA TV Boxing	Phnom Penh, Cambodia	KO	3	
February 7, 2016	Win	(Thailand) Avatar Tor.Morsri	SEA TV Boxing	Phnom Penh, Cambodia	Decision	5	3:00
May 17, 2015	Win	(Cambodia) Meas Phearom	SEA TV Boxing	Phnom Penh, Cambodia	TKO	2	1:35
April 29, 2015	Loss	(Cambodia) Vorn Viva	National friendship battle - Carabao	Phnom Penh, Cambodia	Decision	5	3:00
April 12, 2015	Win	(Cambodia) Meas Phearom	CTN Boxing	Phnom Penh, Cambodia	Decision	5	
January 18, 2015	Win	(Cambodia) Meas Phearom	Bayon TV Boxing	Phnom Penh, Cambodia	KO	2	2:28
July 18, 2014	Win	(Cambodia) Meas Phearom	CTN Boxing	Phnom Penh, Cambodia	KO	3	0:32
June 15, 2014	Loss	(Cambodia) Keo Rumchong	Bayon TV Boxing	Phnom Penh, Cambodia	Decision	5	3:00
July 6, 2013	Loss	(Cambodia) Long Sophy	TV3 Boxing	Phnom Penh, Cambodia	Decision	5	
July 28, 2012	Loss	(Cambodia) Vorn Viva	CTN Boxing	Phnom Penh, Cambodia	KO	1	0:20
August 27, 2011	Loss	(Cambodia) Ot Phuthong	TV5 Boxing	Phnom Penh, Cambodia	Decision	5	3:00
Legend: Win Loss Draw/no contest Notes

== Muay Thai record ==
Professional Muay Thai record
2 wins (2 (T)KOs), 0 loss, 0 draws
Date	Result	Opponent	Event	Location	Method	Round	Time
February 26, 2023	Win	(Russia) Firdavszhon Naiimov	International Friendship battle - Thai Fight	Bangkok, Thailand	KO	1	2:40
February 5, 2023	Win	(England) Thomas Carpenter	2023 Thai Fight Championship	Bangkok, Thailand	KO	1	1:56
Thai Fight Kard Chuek 78 kg Championship belt
Legend: Win Loss Draw/no contest Notes

== Kickboxing record ==
Professional Kickboxing record
0 wins, 1 loss, 0 draws
Date	Result	Opponent	Event	Location	Method	Round	Time
April 10, 2022	Loss	(China) Wang Ao Gang	Angkor King Fight	Siem Reap, Cambodia	Decision	3	
Legend: Win Loss Draw/no contest Notes
