= Reda Oudgou =

French Kickboxer

- Other names: Soom Soom
- Height: 6 ft 1 in (185 cm)
- Division: Welterweight
- Style: Kickboxing; MMA
- Team: Haute Tension MMA

Reda Oudgou is a French professional kickboxer. He is the current MTGP kickboxing world champion in the Light Cruiserweight division. He holds the ISKA world title at 85 kg in the K-1 category.

== Career ==
At an early age, Reda Oudgou started training at in kickboxing and mixed martial arts. He has competed all over the world but especially in Europe. His kickboxing record is 32 wins and 5 losses. Reda has won six belts including 3 French national titles, ISKA world championship, WBC Mediterranean championship, and the MTGP championship.

He has fought in MMA for almost 10 years. In the past, he could only compete abroad because MMA wasn't legal in France. He would regularly go compete in Switzerland, Germany and Belgium.

Reda Oudgou had a victory KO over Romanian Alexandru Negera to become the new ISKA world champion in the 85 kg division.

Reda Oudgou of France fought with Anatoly Sukhanov of Ukraine to see who would win the WMC Cruiserweight European title (86.17 kg). After 5 rounds, the judges decision favored Anatoly.

At M-1 Global's 88th event in Moscow, Reda Oudgou lost to Ruslan Shamilov by submission.

On June 27, 2024, Prom Samnang defeated Reda Oudgou by decision in Paris, France.

For the WBC June 2024 Rankings, the WBC ranked him the number 6 contender in the light heavyweight division.

== Titles and accomplishments ==
- ISKA World Championship
- WBC Mediterranean Championship
- MTGP Kickboxing World Championship
