= Myanmar Lethwei Federation =

Martial arts organization

Myanmar Lethwei Federation မြန်မာနိုင်ငံရိုးရာလက်ဝှေ့အဖွဲ့ချုပ်
- Sport: Lethwei
- Jurisdiction: Ministry of Sports and Youth Affairs
- Abbreviation: MLF
- Founded: 1995
- Headquarters: Thuwunna Indoor Stadium; Offices in Thein Pyu Stadium
- Location: Yangon, Myanmar
- President: U Thein Aung
- Chairman: U Sai Zaw Zaw
- Vice president: Ne Win

Official website
- mtlfederation.org

Myanmar Lethwei Federation (MLF) (Burmese: မြန်မာနိုင်ငံရိုးရာလက်ဝှေ့အဖွဲ့ချုပ်) formerly known as Myanmar Traditional Lethwei Federation is one of two major organizations which sanctions professional Lethwei bouts worldwide and the only one who oversees Lethwei competitions in Myanmar.

== History ==
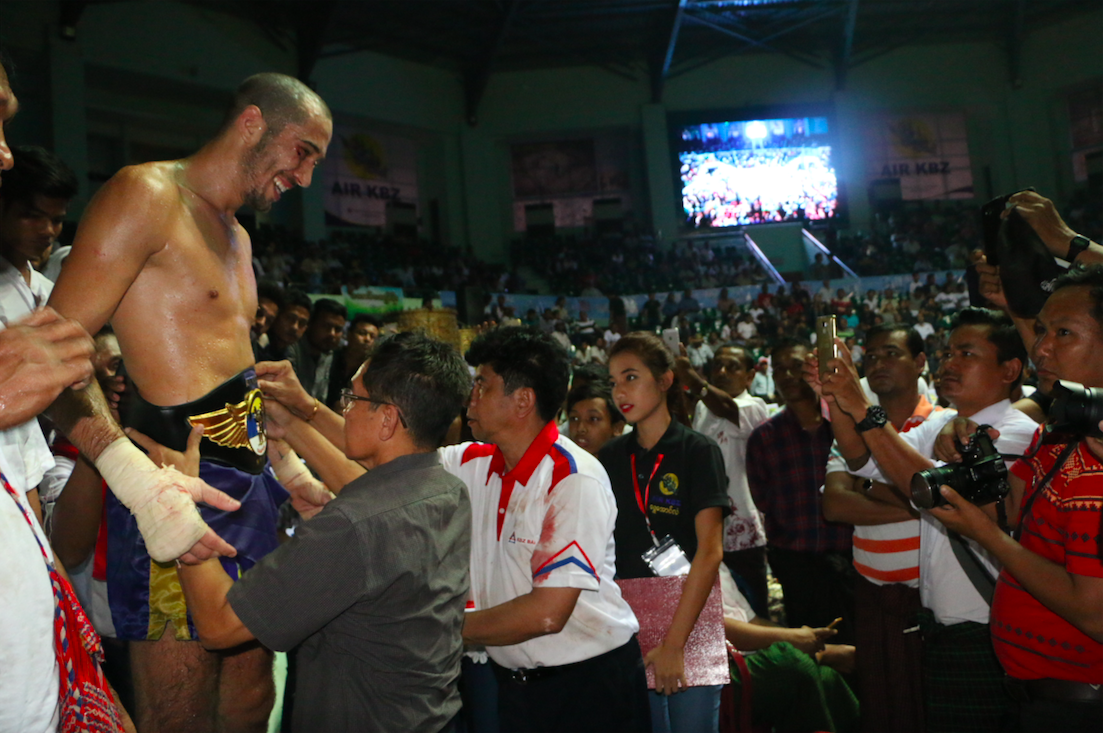
U Thein Aung, President of the Myanmar Lethwei Federation awarding the Lethwei Golden Belt to Dave Leduc at Thein Pyu Stadium in 2016.

The Myanmar Lethwei Federation or MLF is a branch of the Myanmar's Ministry of Health and Sports. The federation was initially founded in 1995 as the Myanmar Traditional Boxing Federation, since Lethwei is translated to Boxing in Burmese language. In 2019, the federation adapted its name to the MTLF - Myanmar Traditional Lethwei Federation, reflecting a more modern approach to the world and later updated it to Myanmar Lethwei Federation.

Since 1990's, MLF has been the sponsor of Thein Pyu Stadium in Yangon, Myanmar and holds an office space in the premise.

In 2016, the MLF granted a "Grade-A" promoter licence from the International Lethwei Federation Japan allowing them to organize traditional Lethwei events in Japan.

=== Banning Leduc ===
On April 28, 2021, Dave Leduc criticized Muay Thai fighter Buakaw Banchamek and historical figure Nai Khanom Tom in a social media post. Leduc questioned the veracity and claimed that the Nai Khanom Tom folklore story is exaggerated and that he was simply a prisoner in ancient Burma, referring to Siamese prisoners captured by Burmese troops during the Burmese–Siamese War. The post sparked considerable backlash from the Muaythai and combat sports community. In a letter, the Myanmar Traditional Lethwei Federation explained that Muaythai promoters made a complaint about Leduc. Muaythai promoter Nuttadaj Vachirarattanawong urged the MTLF to reprimand Leduc. According to the MTLF, Leduc had "committed personal attacks" on Buakaw Banchamek and Muaythai history potentially tarnishing the relationship between Myanmar and Thailand. In May 2021, the federation issued Leduc a two-year ban on Lethwei competitions under the MTLF.

== See also ==
- List of Lethwei fighters
- World Lethwei Federation
- International Lethwei Federation Japan
- World Lethwei Championship
