= World Lethwei Federation =

World Lethwei Federation ကမ္ဘာ့လက်ဝှေ့အဖွဲ့ချုပ်
- Sport: Lethwei
- Category: Sports federation
- Jurisdiction: Worldwide
- Abbreviation: WLF
- Founded: 2019
- Headquarters: Copenhagen, Denmark
- President: Andi Egeberg
- Vice president: Dean Rosenwald

Official website
- worldlethwei.org

The World Lethwei Federation (WLF) (Burmese: ကမ္ဘာ့လက်ဝှေ့အဖွဲချုပ်) was founded in 2019 as the international governing body for amateur and professional Lethwei. The WLF has the responsibility to sanction and support the growth of Lethwei worldwide outside of Myanmar, including enforcement of its traditions, rules and regulations.

== History ==
In 2018, Danish businessman Andi Egeberg invited Lethwei world champion Dave Leduc and organized the first Lethwei seminar in the country of Denmark. In 2019, Egeberg established the Danish Lethwei Federation (Danish: Dansk Lethwei Forbund) and founded the World Lethwei Federation headquartered in Copenhagen. Operating as a member of the World Lethwei Federation, the Slovak Lethwei Association (Slovak: Slovenská Lethwei Associácia) has supported the growth of the sport in Eastern Europe by sanctioning many Lethwei events in Slovakia. Due to the violent ruleset, Lethwei is difficult to sanction and is only legal in a few countries outside of Myanmar.

On November 7, 2020, in partnership with the Wyoming Combat Sports Commission, the WLF sanctioned the first-ever Lethwei fight and the first Lethwei world championship fight in the United States. Dave Leduc defended his traditional Lethwei world title against the American Cyrus Washington at the Outlaw Saloon in Cheyenne, Wyoming. In 2021, the Amateur Lethwei World Championship scheduled to be held August in Warsaw, Poland, was cancelled due to COVID-19 pandemic travelling restrictions. On October 29, 2022, the WLF sanctioned the first-ever Lethwei World championship in Europe. The match featured the Slovak Michal Kosik against the Canadian Daniel Lariviere in Brezno, Slovakia.

In 2023, the World Lethwei Federation selected Prom Samnang as the challenger for the openweight Lethwei World Championship against Dave Leduc because of his winning streak in Kun Khmer. The match was scheduled to take place on May 27, 2023, in Banská Bystrica, but was cancelled because Samnang was denied a Schengen visa to enter Slovakia.

On July 8, 2023, the WLF to unveiled its inaugural Red belt for the world title fight between Ivan Hatala and Artur Saladiak. "Boxing has the WBC Green belt, Lethwei has the WLF Red belt." said President Andi Egeberg. Saladiak defeated Hatala by TKO in the fourth round and became the WLF Lightweight champion.

=== MTLF controversy ===
In 2021, the Myanmar Traditional Lethwei Federation (MTLF) issued an official letter banning the Lethwei world champion Dave Leduc from competing under their federation for 2 years, because of provoking comments he made about Buakaw Banchamek and the sport of Muaythai.

== See also ==
- List of Lethwei fighters
- Myanmar Lethwei Federation
- World Lethwei Championship
- International Lethwei Federation Japan
