= Kun Khmer =

Martial art native to Cambodia

Kun Khmer គុនខ្មែរ
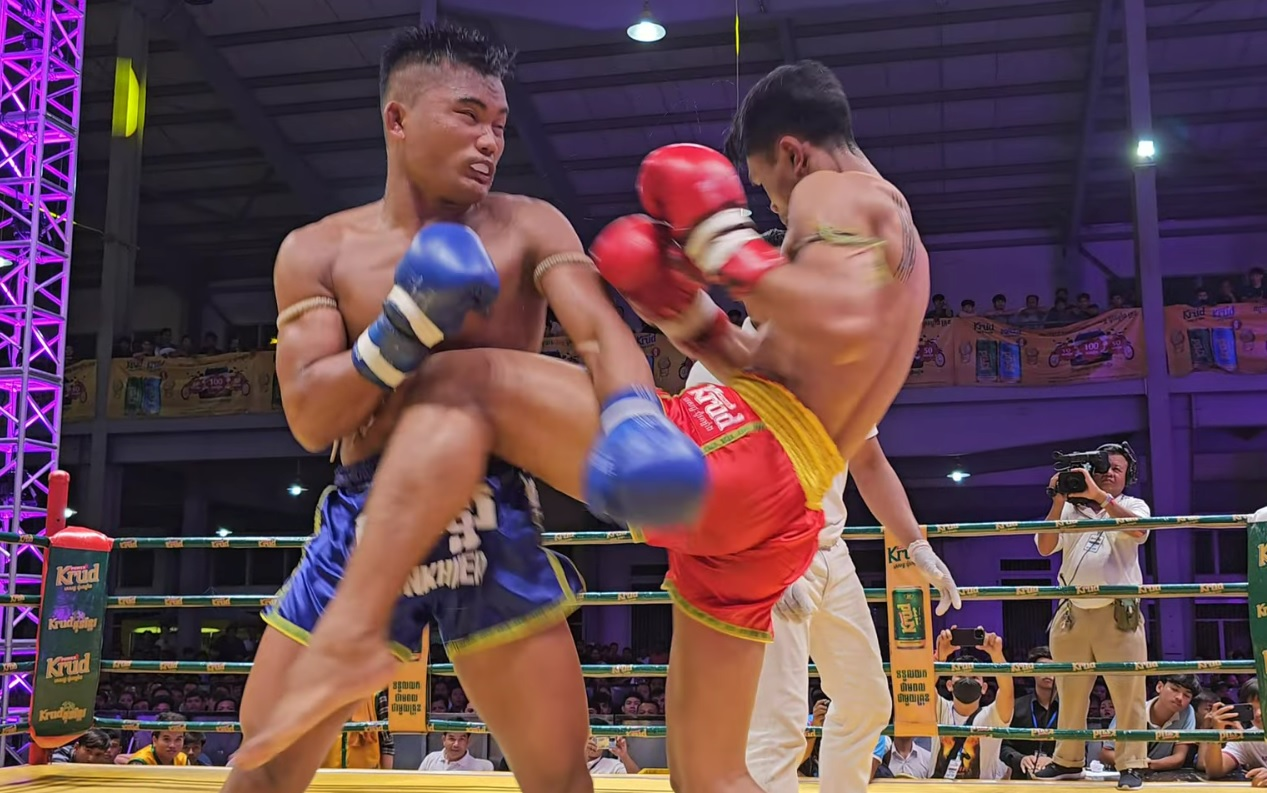
- Also known as: Pradal, Pradal Serey, Khmer boxing, Cambodian boxing
- Focus: Striking, clinching, grappling holds
- Hardness: Full-contact
- Country of origin: Cambodia
- Famous practitioners: Keo Rumchong, Eh Phouthong, Prom Samnang, Thun Sophea, Thoeun Theara
- Parenthood: Bokator, Khmer traditional wrestling
- Olympic sport: No

Kun Khmer (Khmer: គុនខ្មែរ [kun kʰmae] lit. 'Khmer martial arts'), or Pradal Serey (Khmer: ប្រដាល់សេរី [prɑɗal seːrəj] lit. 'free boxing'), is a combat sport that originated in Cambodia. The sport consists of stand up striking and clinch fighting, where the objective is to knock an opponent out, force a technical knockout, or win a match by points. The sport was codified in Cambodia by the French colonial administration in the early 20th century, and was derived from centuries-old traditions, namely Bokator, the close-quarter combat system used during the Khmer empire. The official name of the sport in Khmer is Kbach Kun Pradal Khmer (Khmer: ក្បាច់គុនប្រដាល់ខ្មែរ [kʰɓac kun prɑɗal kʰmae] lit. 'Khmer martial art of boxing').

== History ==
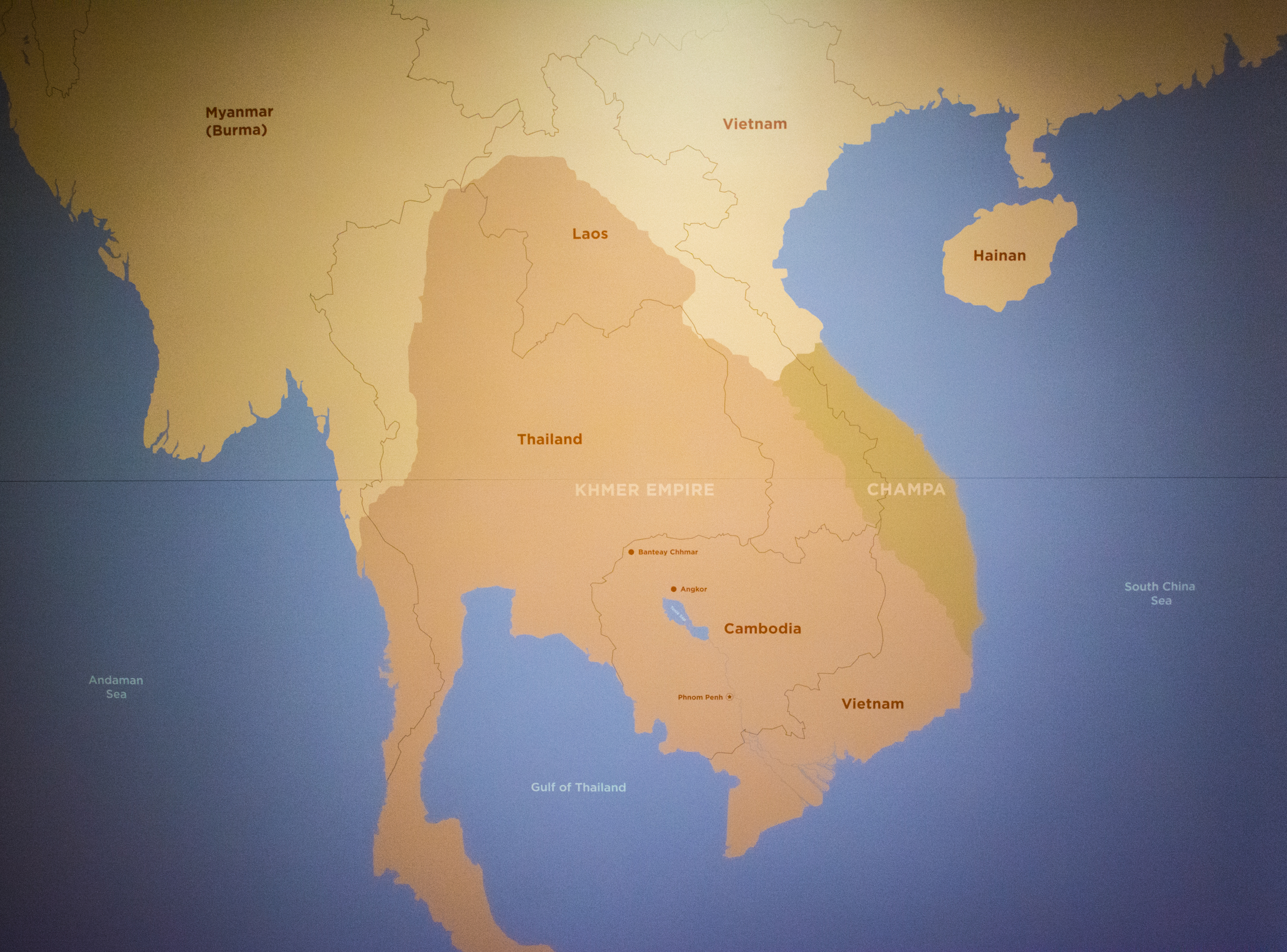
Map of the Khmer Empire (802–1431 AD), where Kun Khmer traces its origin.

Kun Khmer developed from the ancient Khmer martial arts, now commonly referred to as Bokator. Dating back to the 1st century AD, the martial arts in Cambodia are deeply rooted in the country's history, and are depicted in the various bas-reliefs of the Angkor period. Um Yurann, the deputy director of the Cambodian Boxing Federation, highlights the bas-reliefs found on the ancient walls of the Angkor temples, dating from the ninth to the twelfth century, as evidence that Cambodians have been engaged in the sport for hundreds of years. Archaeologist Phoeung Dara has noted that several bas-relief sculptures depicting Cambodian martial arts are associated with Kun Khmer. These artistic representations are located in various temples, including Angkor Wat, Bayon, Ta Prohm, Banteay Samre, Preah Khan, and Prei Temples.

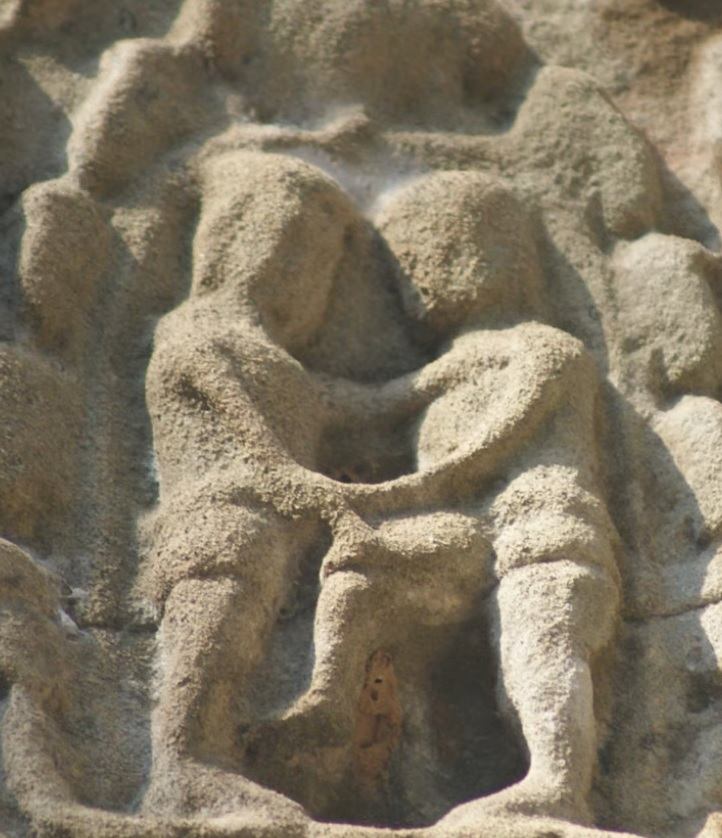
Carving from the 12th century Ta Prohm temple depicting two men clinch fighting and a knee strike.

During the early 20th century, the local martial traditions were codified by the French administration, giving birth to Pradal Serey, now more widely known as Kun Khmer. Boxing matches were originally fought in dirt pits with limited rules, while hands were wrapped in rope. From 1920 to 1930, it was common for boxing matches to result in deaths. Fighters in Battambang province, during the early 20th century, utilized glove-like knuckle dusters made from shells to inflict injuries on their opponents in kickboxing matches.

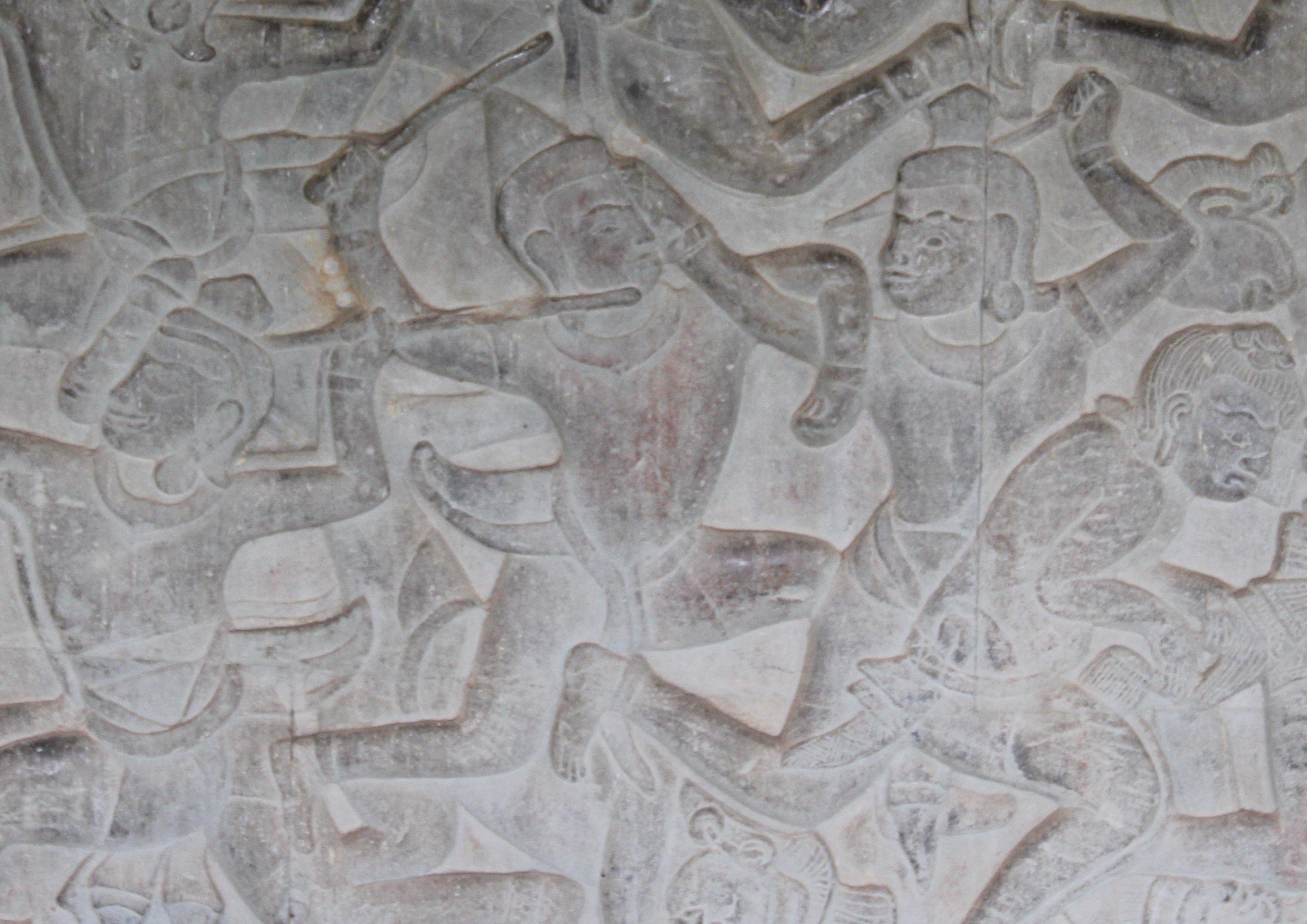
Elbow strike bas-relief at Angkor Wat temple.

According to Pel Yat, an elderly villager from Battambang, as documented in a 1974 publication regarding the social history of the province, “Boxers fought until death. During the bout, a stretcher to carry out the dead was brought in; it was kept there in case a boxer died. The winner received a prize from the committee.” Chhit Sarim, a kickboxer instructor from Siem Reap, described tournaments around his village from the first half of the last century, "Coffins were placed near the ring ready for the possibility of a dead loser. The boxers did not use gloves to protect from injury, they just wrapped silk thread around their fists. On their arms they tied katei - magical plants wrapped in red pieces of cloth that would cause their opponent to see multiple images of their body in the ring. They were great boxers." In order to avoid the fatal casualties, the French set up a series of rules that combined Western boxing with Khmer boxing.

France organized its own athletes to face off against Cambodian athletes. Recognizing the impressive capabilities of Khmer martial arts, particularly in the use of elbows, knees, fists, and other lethal techniques, including those that could result in neck injuries, the French administration introduced a modified version of boxing. This new sport mandated that all participants wear gloves, imposed time limits on matches, instituted rest periods, and prohibited certain techniques to mitigate risks to life. The intention behind this French initiative was to restrict the abilities of Khmer competitors while providing an opportunity for French athletes familiar with Khmer martial arts to secure victories in the contests. Subsequently, this definition evolved into the established rules of the game, leading to its recognition as a popular sport. Freestyle boxing(pradal serey) represents a fusion of the universal sport of boxing, rooted in European tradition, and the traditional martial arts of the Khmer culture. Through an agreement between French and Cambodian working groups, specific regulations were implemented, including prohibitions on additional time for falls, neck strikes, the use of protective gear, and other lethal techniques. This sport gained popularity during the French colonial period and the rules and format subsequently spread to Vietnam, Laos, and various other nations under the French sphere of influence. Kickboxing in Vietnam existed before 1979 but was then banned. The Vietnamese kickboxing art was historically similar to Khmer Boxing or Pradal Serey.

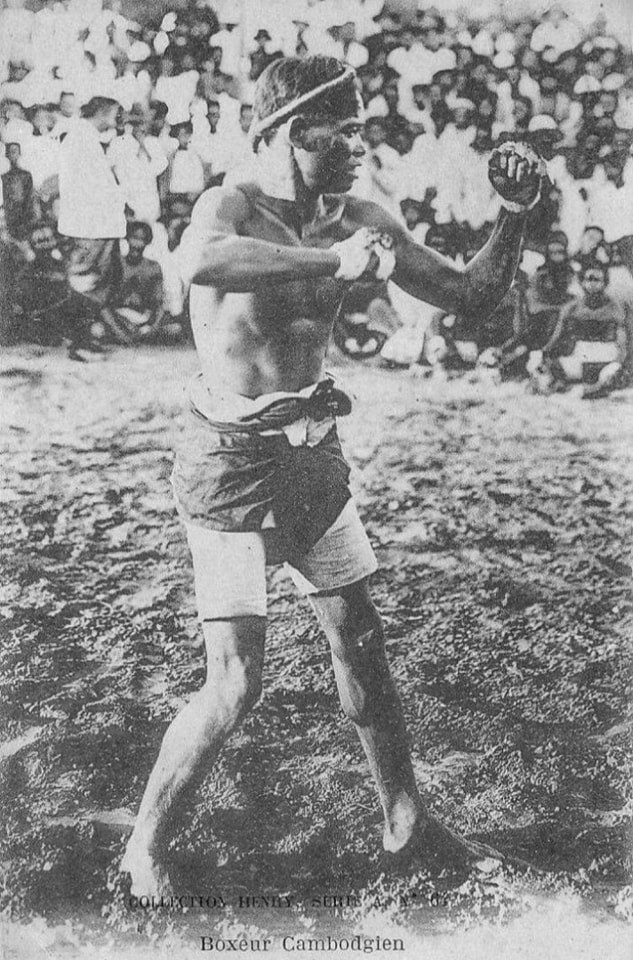
Cambodian Boxer(Boxeur Cambodgien)

The introduction of boxing rings, rounds, and gloves, as well as the prohibition of life-threatening techniques, transformed the local martial arts into a sport. With those new sets of rules, French and Khmer boxers would compete against each other in tournaments. In the 1960s, Cambodian boxing promoters held inter-martial arts exhibitions.

=== Downfall of Kun Khmer ===
During the chaos of the Vietnam War, American President Nixon chose to get involved in Cambodia, where a pro-Western regime led by Gen. Lon Nol had usurped Sihanouk's neutral government in March 1970. Since then, the new government had been trying to drive the communists out of their sanctuary along the border. The North Vietnamese easily repelled the Cambodian army's offensives and began providing arms and support to the Cambodian communist faction, called the Khmer Rouge. Eager to back Lon Nol and eliminate the sanctuaries, Nixon approved a significant operation involving a U.S. and South Vietnamese force of 20,000 troops into the border regions. In the U.S., news of the Cambodian incursion sparked widespread protests and demonstrations. During the Vietnam War, Henry Kissinger, serving as National Security Advisor, and then-President Richard Nixon authorized secret bombing operations in neutral Cambodia to target Viet Cong forces located in the eastern region of the country. Ben Kiernan, a historian at Yale University and a prominent authority on Cambodian history, estimates that approximately 500,000 tons of U.S. bombs were released over Cambodia from 1969 to 1973. Scholars have also suggested that the bombing campaign initiated by Nixon and Kissinger contributed significantly to the conditions that led to one of the most devastating genocides of the 20th century.

On April 17, 1975, the Maoist Communist rebels, the Khmer Rouge under the orders of Pol Pot, overthrew the government of the Khmer Republic then-led by Lon Nol. The Khmer Rouge's plan was to eliminate modern society, and create an agrarian utopia. The Khmer Rouge executed educated people, others who had ties to the old government, or anyone who was believed to be “advantaged” by the old society (doctors, teachers, soldiers, actors, musicians, athletes, etc.), and forced the remaining Khmer population into labor camps—in which hundreds of thousands died in executions, starvation and diseases—to be re-educated under the new government. Traditional martial arts were banned at this time, and many boxers were executed, worked to death or fled the country, which nearly caused the demise of Kun Khmer. An estimated 1.7 million Cambodians, or 21% of the population, died during the Khmer Rouge regime, according to the studies of the Cambodia Genocide Program of Yale University. This despotic subjugation lasted for four years until 1979, when Vietnam, invaded and overthrew the Khmer Rouge. During the relative stability with the Vietnamese's protection and after the departure of the Vietnamese, the National Government of Cambodia, under the United Nations, reestablished the Kingdom of Cambodia, and the surviving artisans would slowly began recovering and rebuilding Cambodia's traditional arts, including Kun Khmer.

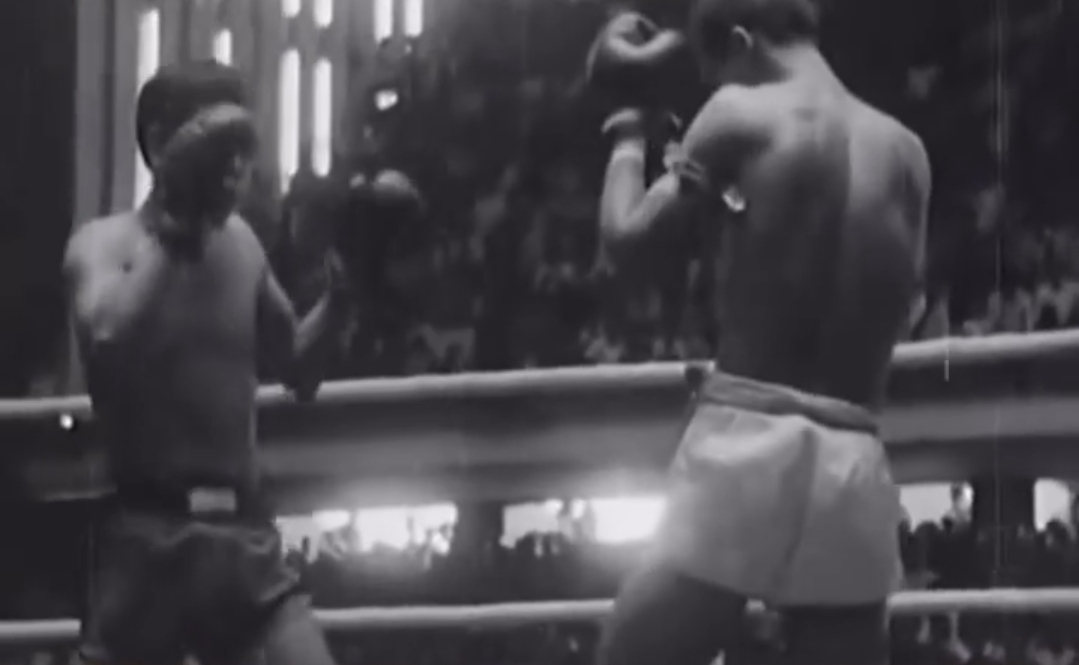
Kun Khmer match at the Olympic Stadium in Phnom Penh in the early 1970s

=== Rebuilding of Kun Khmer ===
Kun Khmer made a strong comeback since its prohibition in the 1970s. Chhith Sarim, a coach in the sport of Khmer kickboxing, expressed regret over Cambodia's loss of prominence in the kickboxing arena during periods of conflict. Despite this setback, he remains resolute in his efforts to restore the country's standing in the sport. Cambodia has made an effort to popularise its style of boxing, despite the lack of financial funding. Numerous gyms have opened, and large masses of students, local and foreign, have come to train in Cambodia. There are weekly matches held, the majority televised live, and many of Cambodia's best have traveled internationally to compete. There are currently approximately 70 boxing clubs nationwide. In 1987, one of the first Kun Khmer schools abroad opened in the United States. It was started by a former national champion by the name of Oumry Ban in Cambodia Town, Long Beach, California.

Kun Khmer is administered in Cambodia by the Cambodian Boxing Federation (CBF), formerly the Cambodian Amateur Boxing Federation (CABF), which was established in 1961. All referees, judges, and fighters must be licensed by the CABF. Television stations which hold Khmer boxing tournaments do so under the supervision of the CBF. The individual stations are responsible for organizing boxers, trainers, medical staff, and musicians. The CBF supplies the match referees, judges, and time-keepers. The current president of the CBF is Major-General Tem Moeun.

Khmer boxing match from 1990's

Abroad, Cambodian boxing is promoted by four organizations. These organizations include: the European Khmer Boxing Federation, based in Germany; the Fédération des Arts Martiaux Khmers (FAMK), based in France; the Ánh Binh Minh Khmer Martial Arts Association, located in Vietnam; and Kun Khmer Australia, based in Australia. Other newly created organizations can be found in Spain and Italy, while Belgium is in the process of forming its own Khmer boxing organization. The International Sport Kickboxing Association (ISKA), based in the United Kingdom, has held matches involving Cambodian boxers. Additionally, Khmer boxers have fought abroad in countries such as South Korea.

There have been concerns about the betting and rowdiness among Kun Khmer fans. Commenting on how the behavior of boxing audiences has noticeably worsened over the years, Cambodian trainer Chiit Sarim has remarked, “I traveled from pagoda to pagoda to box at competitions during the water festival. Pagodas were the traditional venue for boxing matches... They [the current fans] act inappropriately. They raise up their hands and scream noisily. They gamble and do not respect the boxers. They think of only winning their bet. During my time, there was no such thing. Fights were organized nicely and were very popular. Now, fans have no morality.”

Tournaments are screened live on national television. TV5 Cambodia holds live tournaments on Friday and Sunday, CTN holds live tournaments on Friday, Saturday, and Sunday. Bayon Television holds live kickboxing tournaments on Saturday and Sunday, while TV3 holds a single tournament on Sunday, and Apsara TV has added a single tournament on Thursday.

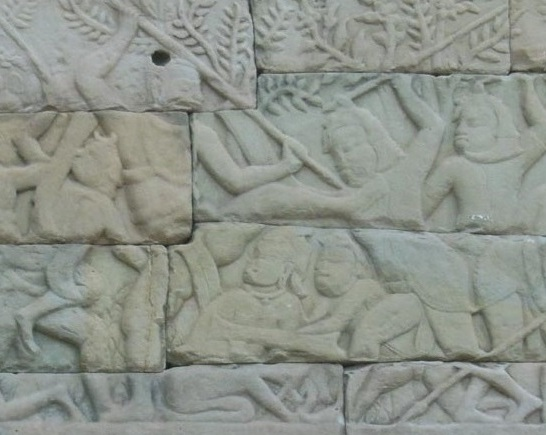
Khmer soldier uses a thrust kick on a Cham soldier in a bas-relief from Banteay Chhmar temple (12th/13th century).

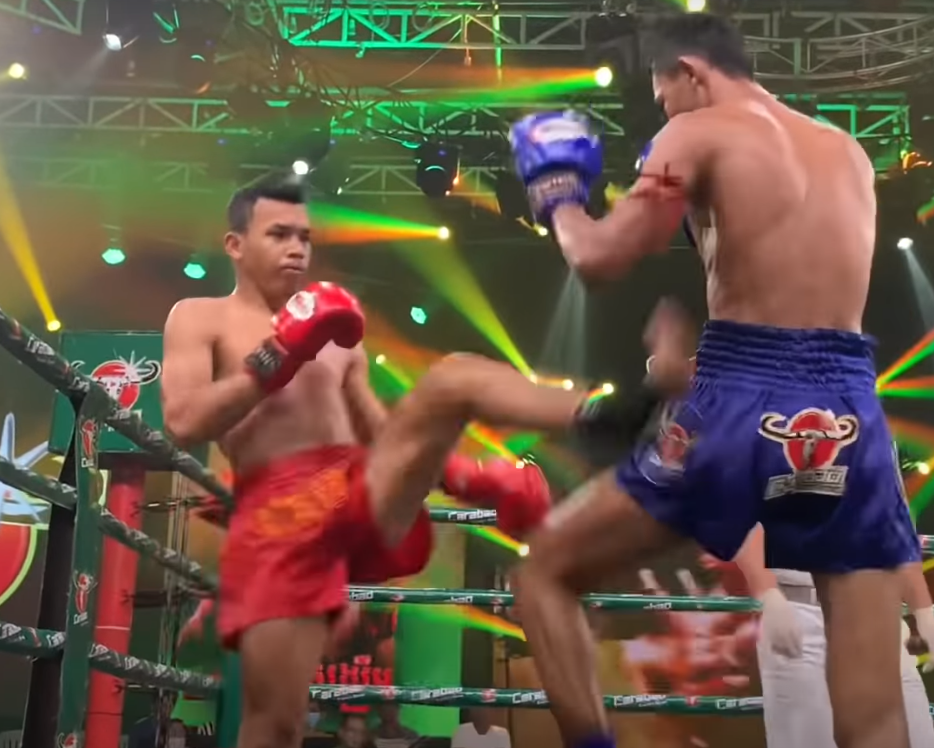
Thrust kick in a modern Kun Khmer match.

Recently, travel journalists and tourists have exposed Kun Khmer to the western world. Features in television programs have further popularized the martial art amongst global viewers; Kun Khmer was featured on The History Channel's Human Weapon, and was also mentioned on the Cambodian episode of Globetrekker. In February 2009, American footballer Dhani Jones filmed an episode of his series Dhani Tackles the Globe in Phnom Penh, training with Long Salavorn at the Salavorn Keila club, and subsequently fighting Pan Phanith at the CTN arena.

In the Cambodian S1 World Championship, Bun Sothea won the tournament. He defeated Michael Paszowski, Dzhabar Askerov, and Lor Samnang in front of 30,000 people at the Phnom Penh National Olympic Stadium.

In 2008, the Cambodian Television Network (CTN) screened a Kun Khmer reality television series called Kun Khmer Champion. The show featured 65 kilogramme (143.3 lbs.) boxers, and was produced by Ma Serey and Aaron Leverton, and co-hosted by Ma Serey and Cambodia's most famous kickboxer, Eh Phouthong. The first series was followed by a second in 2009 and a third in 2010, both co-hosted by Vorn Viva.

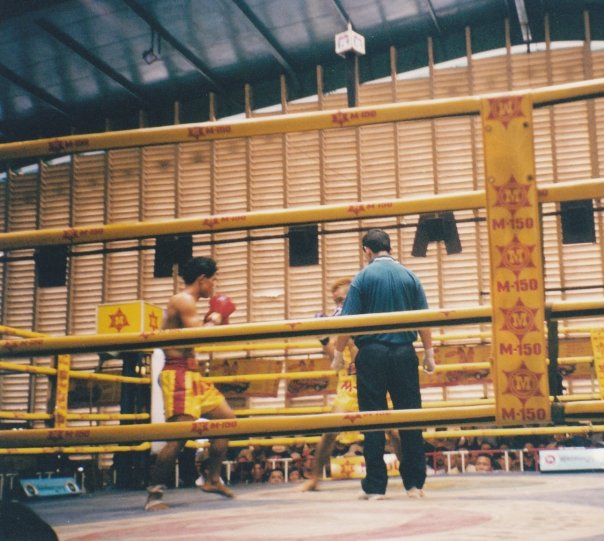
Pradal serey in 2014

On August 28, 2008, Cambodian boxers Vorn Viva and Meas Chantha won the ISKA Middleweight and Welterweight world titles in Phnom Penh. It was the first time a Cambodian had held a kickboxing world title.

In 2011, Prime Minister Hun Sen created a committee responsible for documenting and researching the sport of Khmer kickboxing in order to have it included on UNESCO's intangible cultural heritage list. The 19-member committee included Culture Minister Him Chhem, the boxing federation, Council of Minister officials, and other officials from other government ministries.

In 2011, there were 1,000 registered boxers from 78 martial arts schools.

As of 2012, there are over 50 Kun Khmer fights held every week in the Phnom Penh region.

=== Post-Recovery Era ===
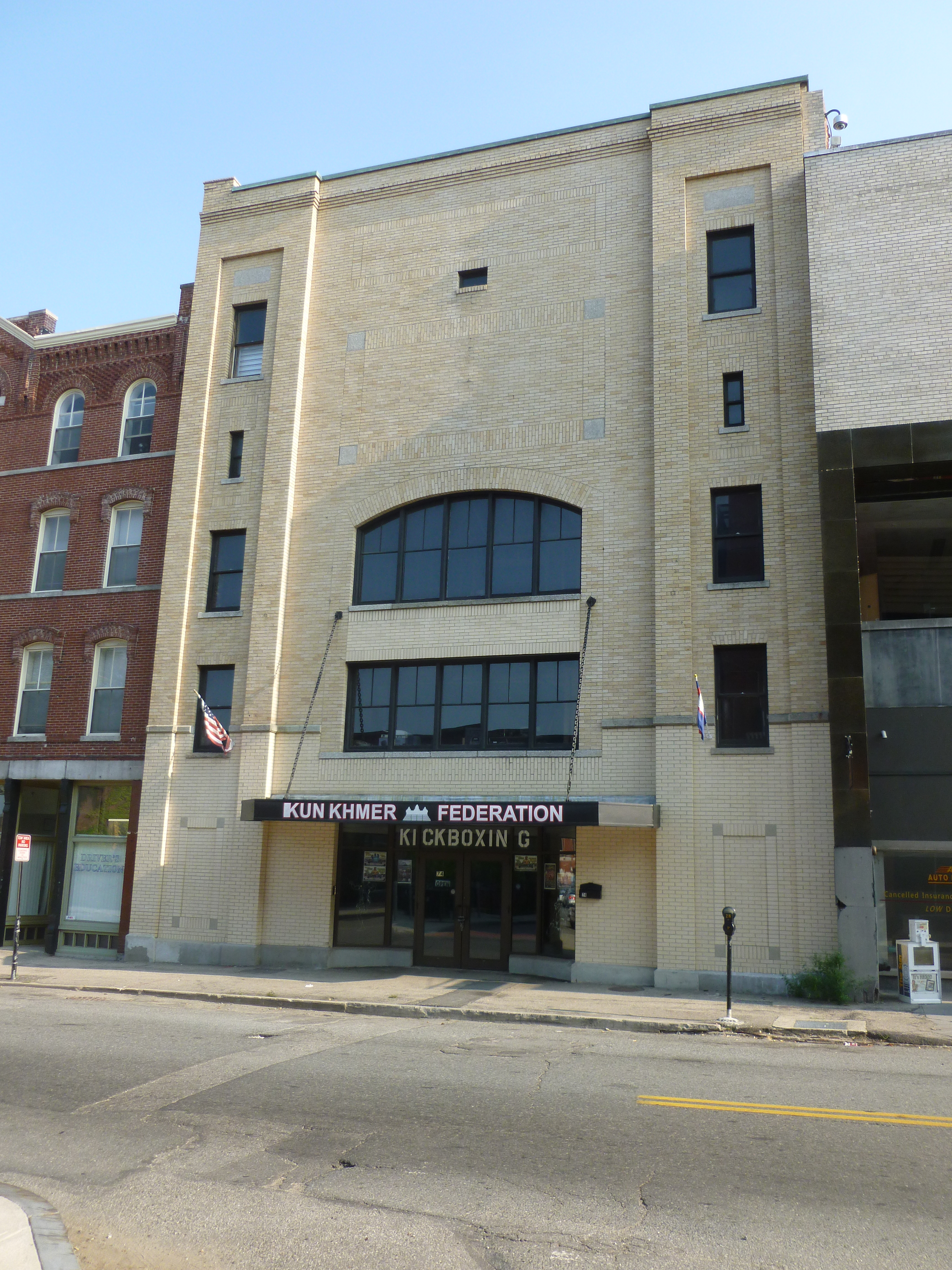
Kun Khmer Federation Kickboxing building; Lowell, Massachusetts, United States.

A well-known promoter stated 2020 would be an important year for development of the sport. Promoter, Matias Andres, via the Riel Team was focused on putting the sport in an international context instead of just focusing on the local scene.

Town Full HDTV brought MAS Fight, a global professional martial arts organization, to Cambodia. It was welcomed as a programme to help promote Kun Khmer internationally.

In 2022, the International Professional Combat Council (IPCC) held their first sanctioned Kun Khmer event in Kampong Speu province.

In 2023, Kun Khmer was added to the Southeast Asian Games Federation's charter and rules. Deputy Prime Minister Tea Banh stated that he was proud that the Southeast Asian Games officially recognized the Cambodian martial art of Kun Khmer.

In 2023, the BKK (Bare Knuckle Kombat) Championship held their first Kun Khmer event.

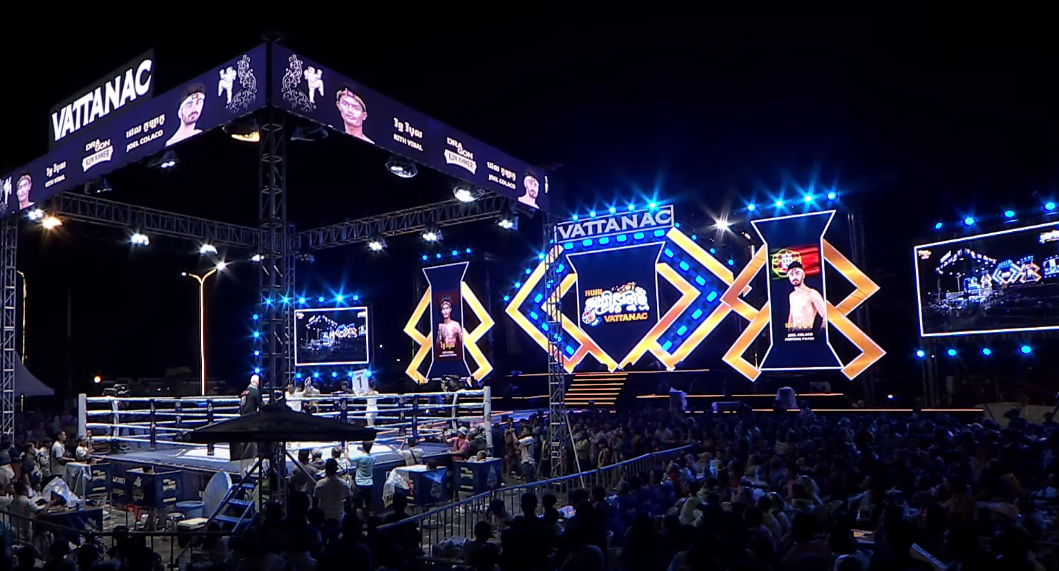
The Dragon Kun Khmer Stage

In 2024, a Kun Khmer event called “Ganzberg Kun Khmer to the World Class” was the first Kun Khmer event to take place in South Korea.

In 2024, Kun Khmer had a historic first-ever event called International Cambodian Kun Khmer Championship on the Greek island of Crete in Heraklion.

In 2024, Chinese martial arts organization, Kunlun Fight, held a Kun Khmer and kickboxing event in Cambodia called Kunlun Fight & Cicada FC.

The 5th Kun Khmer World Championship were held in Siem Reap. The top 5 medal countries were Cambodia(first place), Kyrgyzstan(second place), Afghanistan(third place), Russia(fourth place) and France(fifth place).

The 6th World Kun Khmer Championship was postponed due to border tensions.

In 2026, the Kun Khmer International Federation added eight countries and territories from South America and the Caribbean. These new members were Guadeloupe, Bolivia, Venezuela, Chile, Paraguay, Uruguay, Argentina, and Brazil.

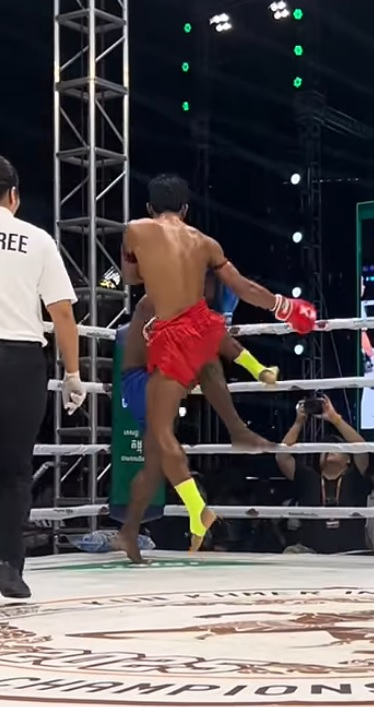
Kun Khmer flying diagonal knee strike

Khov Chhay, the President of the Kun Khmer Federation, has noted significant advancements in the sport of Kun Khmer in recent years. This growth has resulted in increased support for many fighters, including heightened engagement from fans, enhanced opportunities, and expanded sponsorships.

Currently, there are approximately 17 to 20 programs conducted each week. Between 2019 and 2021, the financial remuneration for boxers per tournament ranged between 200,000 and 300,000 riel. In contrast, present compensation has escalated to between $1,000 and $3,000, excluding additional earnings from sponsorships. Chhay remarked, “By including sponsorship rewards, some boxers can earn $7,000, $8,000, or even $10,000 for participating in a single tournament.”

Despite the sport's notable growth, the Kun Khmer Federation has encountered challenges regarding human resources. To address this, the federation is actively encouraging youth participation, targeting both young men and women, to further enhance the prominence and success of Kun Khmer.

The "Phimean Akas Kun Khmer - Fight Clubbing Boostrong" event attracted an estimated 100,000 spectators. It was held at the Terrace at the Elephants in Angkor Archaelogical Park. The event was organized by Italian organizer Fight Clubbing and Town TV. Fight Clubbing describes the event as a world record among active promotions of combat sports.

=== Attempt to unite regional boxing styles ===
Nearby Southeast Asian countries have similar styles of boxing martial arts. At an ASEAN meeting in 1995, Cambodia suggested that the Thai boxing style, Muay Thai, be referred to as "Sovannaphum boxing," or "SEA Boxing," which would collectively represent Thailand, Cambodia, Laos, and Myanmar. Sovannaphum means "golden land" in Khmer, and is written as Suwannabhumi in Thai. The name refers to mainland Southeast Asia in the ancient Indian language of Pali.

However, Thailand would not compromise, stating that each Southeast Asian country has its own boxing style, and that Thailand was responsible for making its boxing style an international sport. When it debuted at the 2005 Southeast Asian Games, Cambodia did not enter the Muay Thai event in protest of the name used to refer to the sport. At subsequent Southeast Asian Games, Southeast Asian boxing has been known by the ethnically neutral term "muay," with the exception of the 2009 Southeast Asian Games in Vientiane, when the sport was called Muay Lao. The decision did not spark any controversy or negative reaction from Thailand or Cambodia at that time.

At the 2023 Southeast Asian Games, held in Cambodia, the event was called Kun Khmer instead of Muay Thai, which led to a boycott by Thailand. In response, Cambodia said it would retaliate by not sending boxers to the 2025 games in Thailand. The Secretary-general of the Cambodian Southeast Asian Games Organising Committee, Vath Chamroeun, asserted, “We are the host country, so we have the right to change it to Kun Khmer, as the sport has its origin in Khmer, and it is our culture.” Cambodian Prime Minister Hun Sen addressed the issue by proposing, “When competing in Cambodia, we call it Kun Khmer; when competing in Thailand, we call it Muay Thai; when competing in Laos, we call it Muay Lao; and in Myanmar, we call it the name of their original martial arts. Can we find a compromise?”

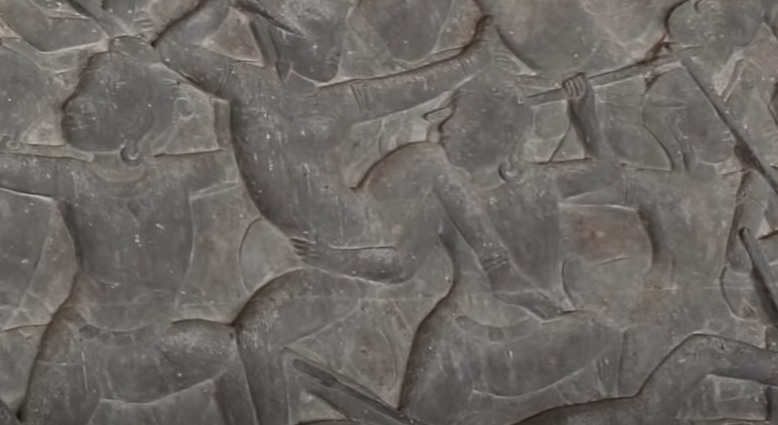
900 year old bas-relief of knee attack to the head. Located at Angkor Wat (1100s).

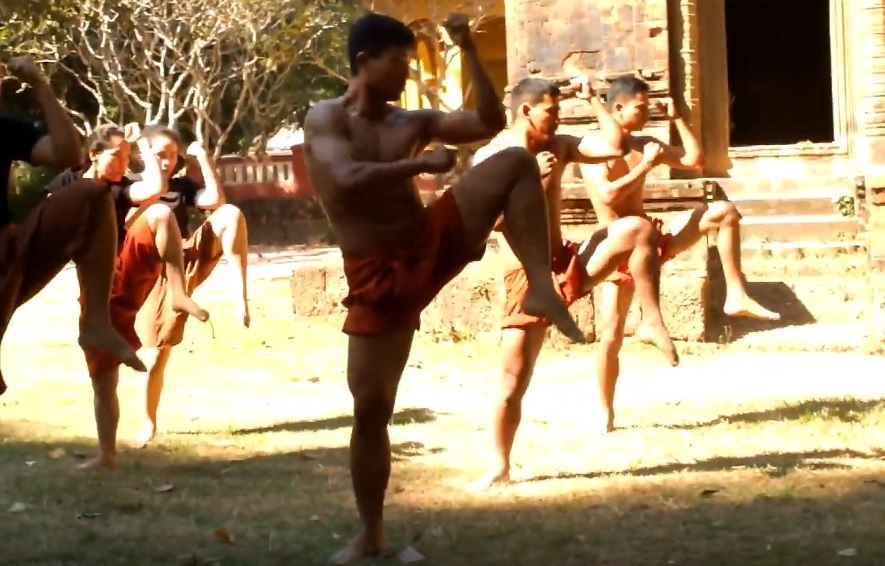
Kun Khmer martial artists practicing knee techniques in modern-day.

Cambodian Prime Minister Hun Sen has suggested that Cambodia, Laos, Myanmar, and Thailand jointly apply for UNESCO status for traditional martial arts. Initially, Muay Lao Federation’s President, Saysamone Sayasone, supported the renaming, and concurred that the sport originated indeed in Cambodia. However, amidst severe backlash from Thailand, he was compelled to apologise for his statements. The International Federation of Muaythai Associations (IFMA) threatened six member-countries from Southeast Asia—Malaysia, Vietnam, the Philippines, Indonesia, Thailand, and Singapore—with a two-year ban on any IFMA competitions and activities, should they join the competition. Eventually, only Thai athletes boycotted the competition.

== Techniques ==
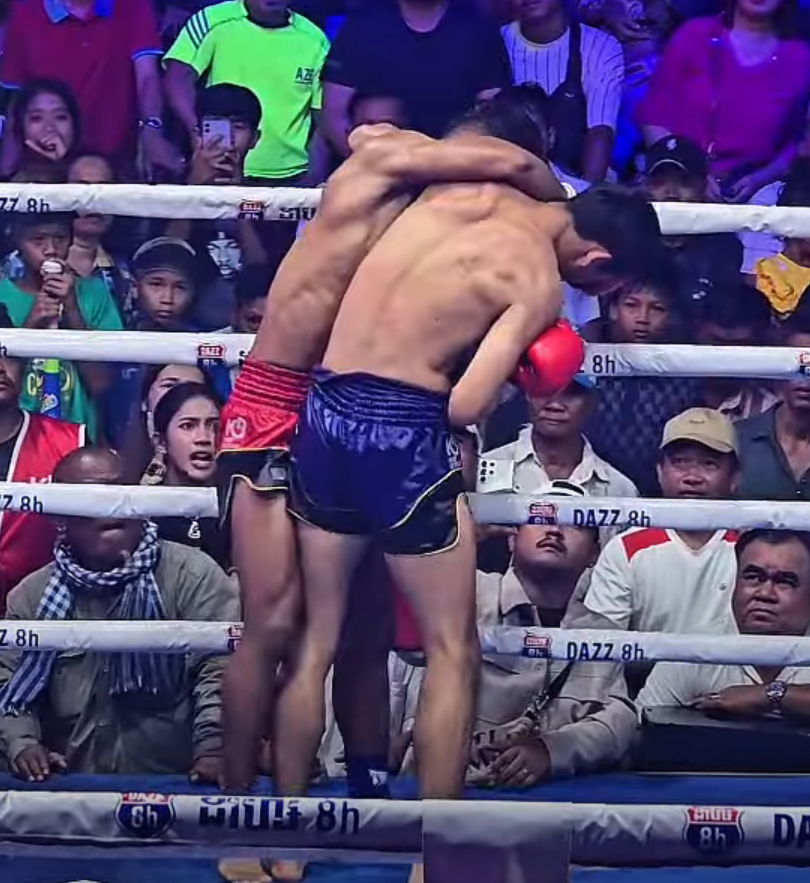
Kun Khmer Side Clinch

An elbow technique that is executed coming down from above into the centerline of the opponent

Kun Khmer consists of four types of strikes: punches, kicks, elbows, and knee strikes. The clinch is used to wear down the opponent. In the clinch, opponents battle for the dominant position for short range strikes by way of elbows and knees. Kun Khmer is most well known for its kicking and elbows technique. The roundhouse kick generates power from hip rotation rather than snapping the leg. The front kick is called sniet theak trang (straight push kick technique) or chrot eysei (hermit's crutch). The push kick is considered easy and simple to use in fights. The push kick can be used on areas that are not carefully guarded by the opponent. The push kick can be delivered by the ball of the foot or the heel of the foot. The push kick can be used to attack below the waist, the chest and the middle of the face.

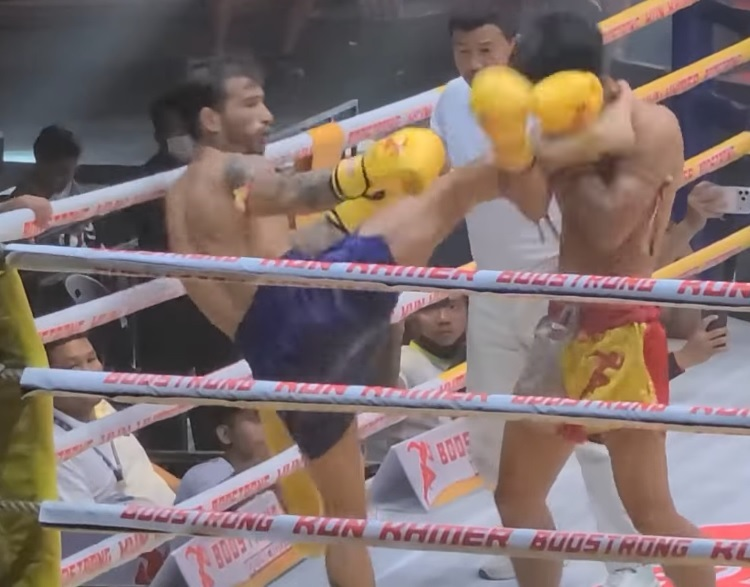
Kun Khmer two arm leg catch technique

Kun Khmer neck clinch technique

Cambodian fighters tend to utilize more elbow strikes than that of other martial arts in the region. To use elbow techniques, an athlete must control their waist which transfers motion to the elbow and then to the shoulder. As an athlete moves their shoulder, the motion is sent back to the elbow. When striking with the elbow, the palm is not place to the side. It has to lean upward a bit to make the elbow sharper. When the palm is placed to the side or downward, the elbow is more rounded. When the palm is turned upward, the elbow is open and an athlete can strike hard because the elbow is sharp. When making a strike, the hand does not make a fist because the force would gather at the wrists and the elbows cannot be used at full force. The hand must be open and turn upward a bit before striking. A number of elbow techniques must be executed coming down from above into the centerline of the opponent or by coming up from below into the opponent's centerline. In Kun Khmer, more victories come by way of an elbow technique than any other strikes. Many techniques have exotic names such as krapeu-ha (crocodile opening its mouth) and kla-krab (tiger lying down).

== Life as a boxer ==
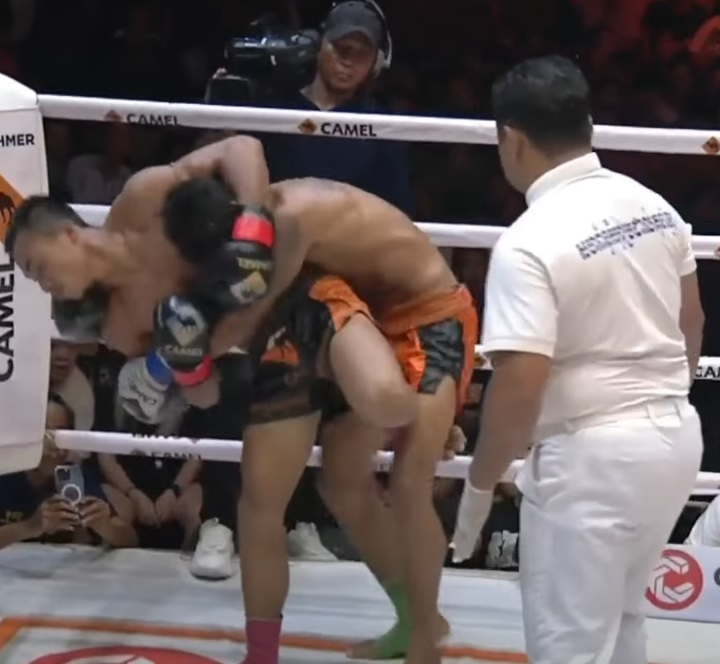
Kun Khmer headlock, a defensive clinching technique to shut down an opponent's attack.

Kun Khmer is an athletic sport that relies on agility, toughness, and flexibility. Most participants are young adults due to the physical conditioning that a boxer must endure to keep their body in shape. The average age ranges from 14 to 25. Most Cambodian boxers come from impoverished backgrounds, and compete to earn money to feed their families and themselves. Top kickboxers can have as many as 200–300 fights in their careers.

Kun Khmer leg catch push technique

Cambodian boxers were traditionally paid by the crowd. If the crowd appreciated the boxer's efforts, they would reward him with food, alcohol, and cash. This practice still continues today, but in line with western practices, bouts pay official fees. Until recently, the average purse for a fight was US$15. Today, purses are based on experience. A new Cambodian boxer can earn US$25 per fight, while more experienced kickboxers with more than a dozen fights can earn up to $75. "Brand name" kickboxers can earn over $100 a fight. Special purse fights will pay up to $250, with the purse contributed by a corporate sponsor. "International" tournaments, organised by the broadcasters, will pay individual purses of up to $1000, sometimes higher.

An estimated 70% of boxers in the Phnom Penh circuit come from the rural northwest. The provinces of Battambang and Banteay Meanchey produce a steady supply of boxers. Some of the best Kun Khmer champions come from the Battambang Province, although a number of big name stars have come via Southern Cambodia, such as Eh Phouthong from Koh Kong Province, Thun Sophea from Svay Rieng Province, and Meas Chantha and Seng Makara from Kandal Province. Cambodian boxers train in a gym under a Kun Khmer kru. The grandmasters that are responsible for preserving traditions are known as achar. Many boxers train 6–8 hours a day and 7 days a week.

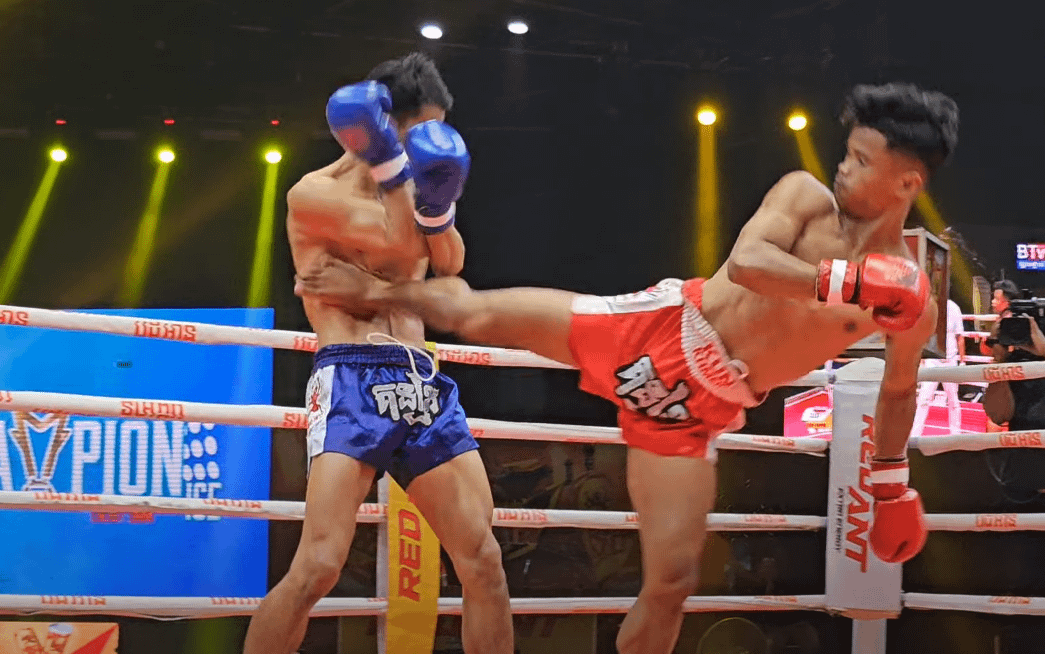
Kun Khmer liver shot back kick. Originally, this technique was used to defend against an attacker chasing from behind.

== Khmer Boxing Federation ==
The Khmer boxing federation was reestablished in 1996. It has had four presidents. Khov Chhay is the current president after the resignation of Tem Meun in 2024.

1. Prum Pich: first term, (1996-2000)

2. Um Yurann: second term (2000-2004), third term (2004-2008)

3. Tem Meun: fourth term(2008-2012), fifth term(2012-2016), sixth term(2016-2021), seventh term (2021-2025)

4. Khov Chhay: Continuation of 7th term (2024-2025)

== Health risk ==
As with all contact sports, health risks are a factor. According to Chhoeung Yavyen, a ringside doctor for the Cambodian Amateur Boxing Association, in the past five years, 30 kickboxers have sustained serious injury in the ring, including broken wrists, arms, shins, noses, and jaws, in addition to dislodged shoulders and hip injuries. One Cambodian boxer died in the ring in Svay Rieng Province in 2001, but that death was the result of a heart attack, probably brought on by diet pills consumed to help the boxer reduce his weight before the bout. Most of the injuries suffered are curable and don't leave lasting problems. Most boxers are allowed to return to the ring after receiving treatment.

== Rules and match setup ==
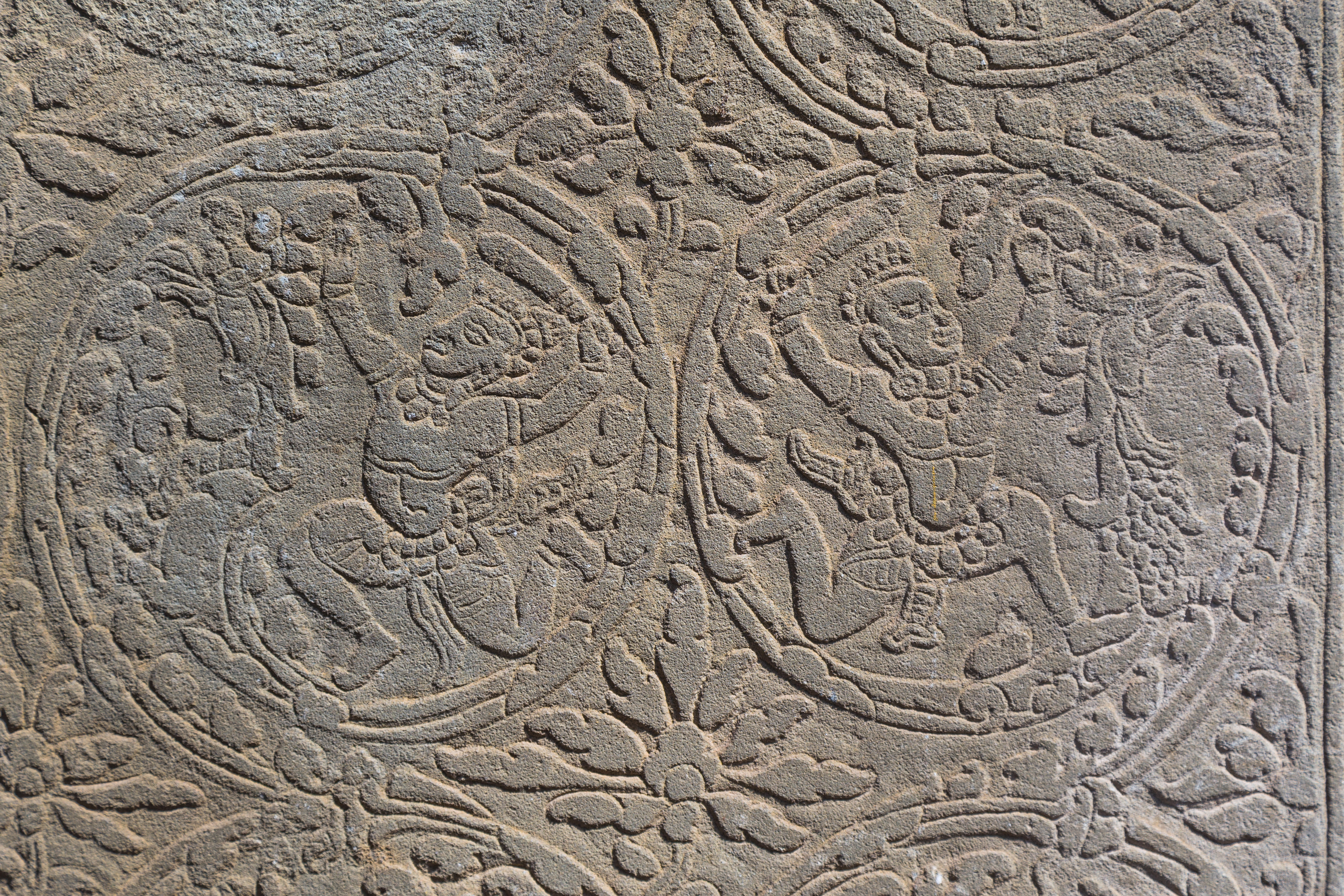
A warrior kneeling for a praying ritual known as tvay kru or kun kru. This ritual is used before fighting.

Music of Kun Khmer
Pleang Pradal
Traditional Khmer music that is played before a Kun Khmer match

A match consists of five three-minute rounds and takes place in a 6.1 meter square boxing ring. A one-and-a-half or two-minute break occurs between each round. In olden times, ancient Khmer people would do praying rituals before going to the battlefield or war. At the beginning of each match the boxers practice the praying rituals known as the kun kru or thvayobangkoum krou. There are different variations of the thvayobangkoum krou ritual with different names such as "Hanuman ties the bridge to Sita". There are 17 different variations of the ritual. Most are based on the main characters of the Reamker story and believe to have occurred when Cambodia had a strong belief in Hinduism. The kun kru pays homage towards the fighter's spirit trainer. The pre-competition teacher offering ritual also serves to warm the muscle and increase blood flow. The praying ritual at the preliminaries of the boxing match is considered a real dance. Traditional Cambodian music performed with the instruments of the sampho (a type of drum), the sralai klang khek (oboe) and the chhing is played during the match. The music of Khmer boxing is called vung phleng pradall or vung phleng klang khek. The music is made up of two sections. The first section is for the boxer's teachers while the second section is the fight music. The first part uses a spirit(teacher) to help the boxers concentrate their minds and have confidence. The first part of the music is played slowly in a rubato style. The melody is played by the sralai(oboe) and the sampho(drum) plays strokes at important points of the melody. The second part which is the fight music is played much faster and in meter. The music accelerates with the progression of the round. It stops at the end of the round or when someone is knocked out. When the fight is exciting, the audience claps in rhythm with the beat of the sampho(drum). Modern boxers wear leather gloves and nylon shorts.

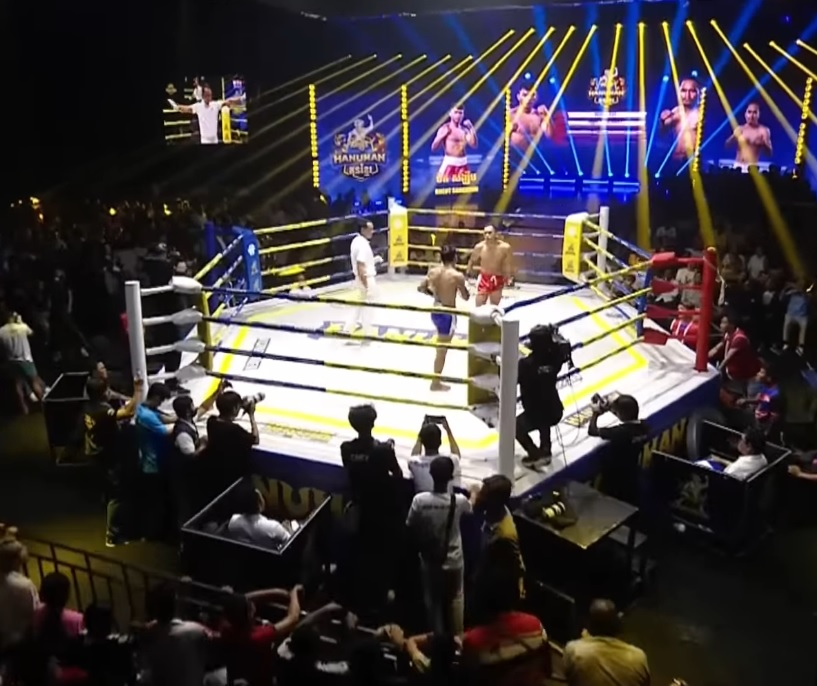
The Hanuman Kun Khmer Stage. It uses a non-traditional hexagon ring.

Kun Khmer rules:

1. A boxer is not allowed to strike his opponent while he is on the ground.
2. A boxer is not allowed to bite.
3. When an opponent cannot continue, the referee stops the fight.
4. Blows to the back of the opponent are not allowed.
5. A boxer may not hold on to the ropes.
6. Blows to the genitals are prohibited.

Victory can be obtained by knockout. A knockout occurs when a boxer is knocked down to the ground and cannot continue fighting after a 10-second count by the referee, a referee may forgo the count and declare a knockout if it is obvious the boxer will not regain his feet unaided. Victory can be obtained at the end of the match when judges decide by a point system which fighter was more effective. If fighters end up with the same score a draw is called. Kicking a downed opponent causes a fighter to lose points. Constantly retreating when the opponent attempts to approach causes a fighter to lose points.

== Promoters ==
- Cambodian Television Network
- Bayon Television
- Kun Khmer Super Fight-KSF
- TV5 Cambodia
- National Television of Cambodia
- Hang Meas HDTV

== Notable Kun Khmer boxers ==
- Eh Phouthong
- Thoeun Theara
- Eh Amarin Phouthong
- Thun Sophea
- Lorn Panha
- Pich Sophann
- Pich Sambath
- Keo Rumchong
- Prom Samnang
- Lao Chetra
- Lao Chantrea
- Phal Sophorn
- Chhut Serey Vannthong
- Khun Bora
- Chhoeung Lvai
- Long Samnang
- Soth Kevin
- Chey Kosal
- Bird Kham
- Lerk Vibol
- Vorn Viva
- Noun Phirum
- Khim Dima
- Chit Sarim
- Chea Sarak
- Bun Sothea: Two time Kubota champion (54 kg and 60 kg). Student of Thun Sophea.
- Oumry Ban: Former Kun Khmer champion who held the first national title in 1964 at 61 kilograms and current owner of Long Beach Kickboxing Center
- Sen Rady

== Image gallery ==
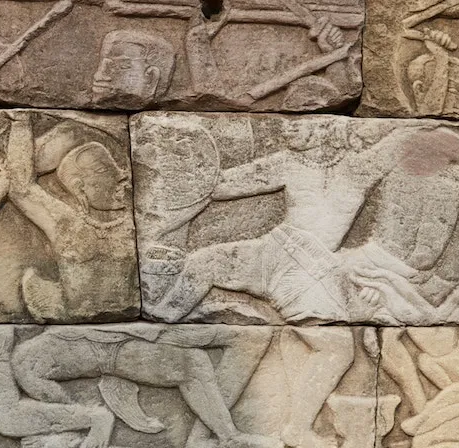
Thrust kick to the quadriceps. Located at Banteay Chhma temple(12th/13th century)

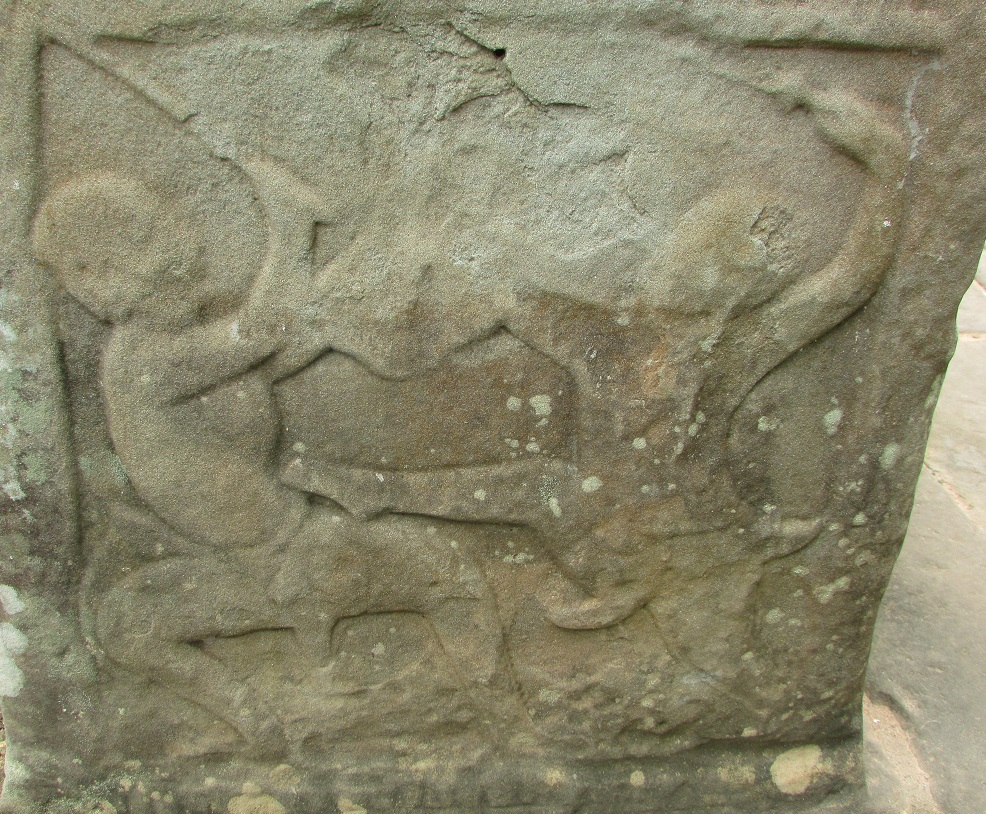
Thrust Kick

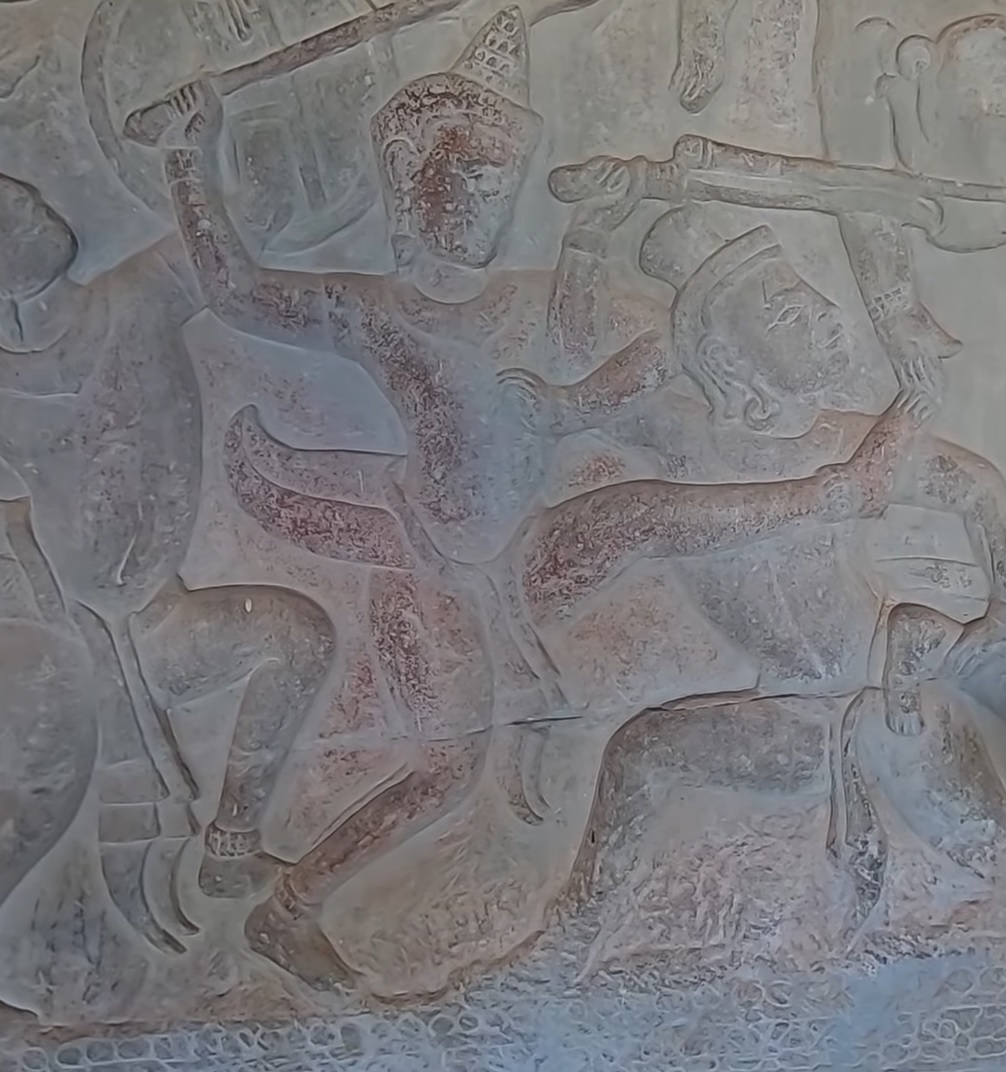
High thrust kick to shoulder and elbow attack to the head. Bas-relief at Angkor Wat(1100s)

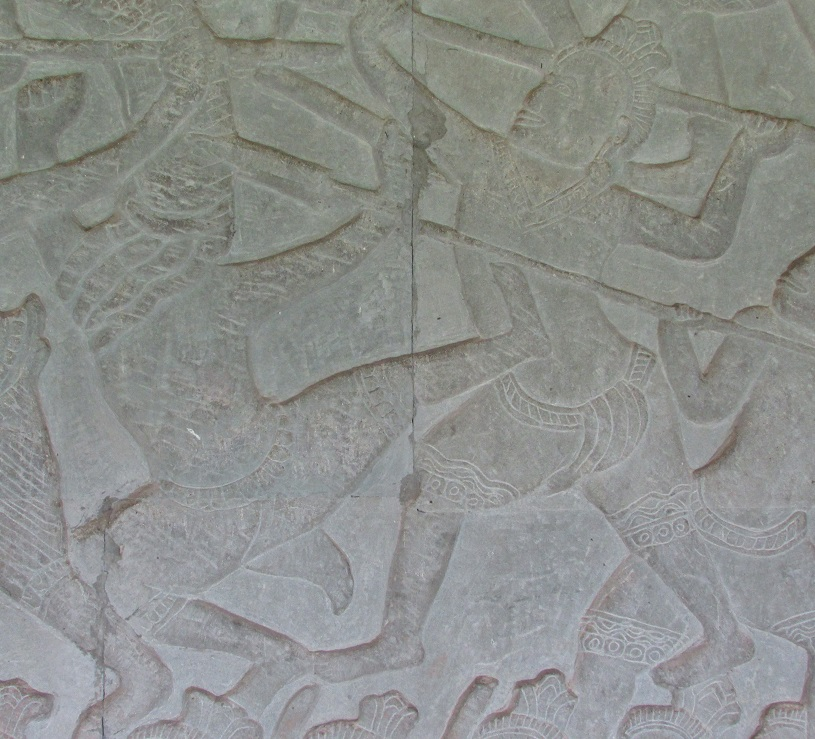
Front kick to the torso

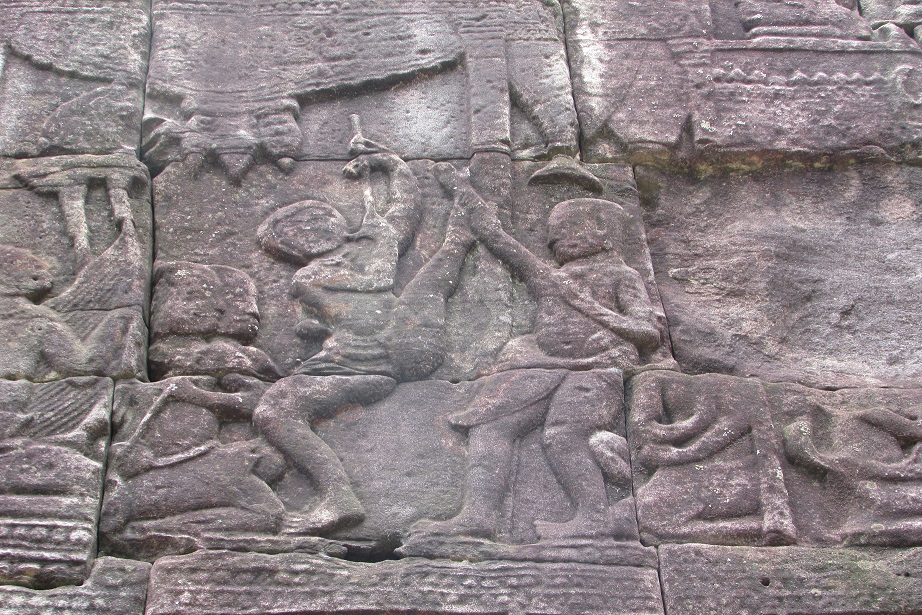
High kick demonstration. Located at Bayon temple

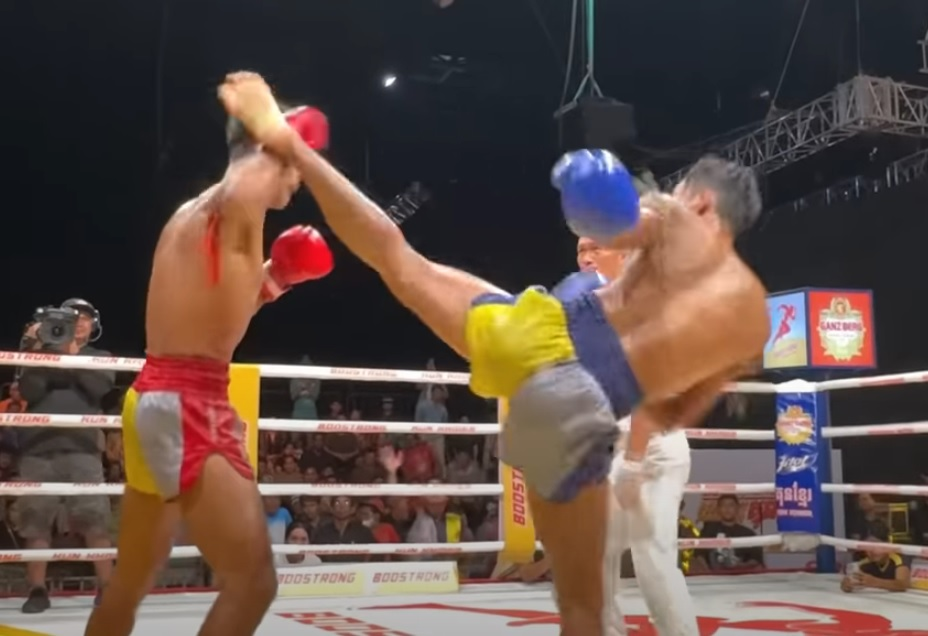
Romvong preah chan(round moon) kick

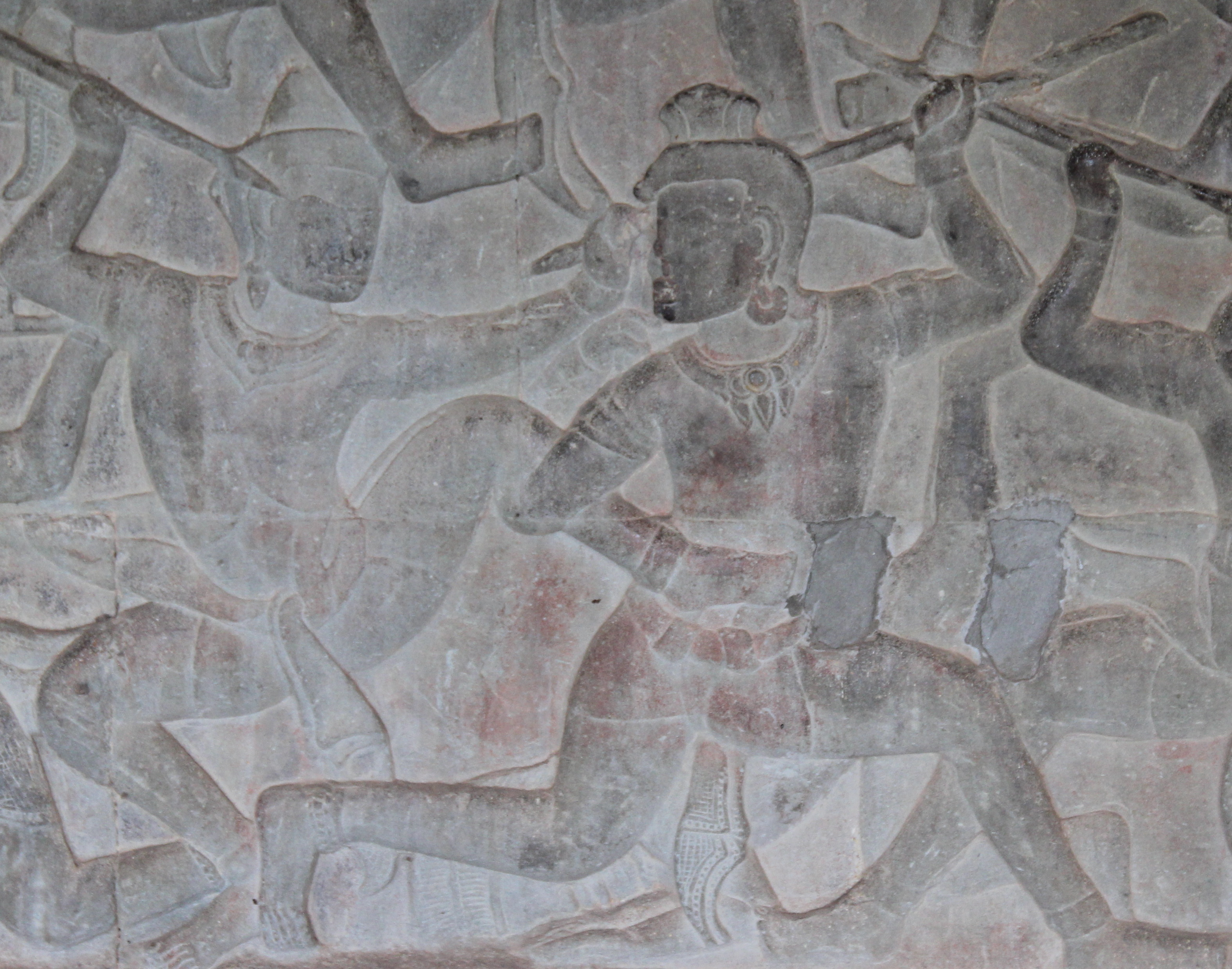
Bas-relief of push kick and leg catch at Angkor Wat(1100s)

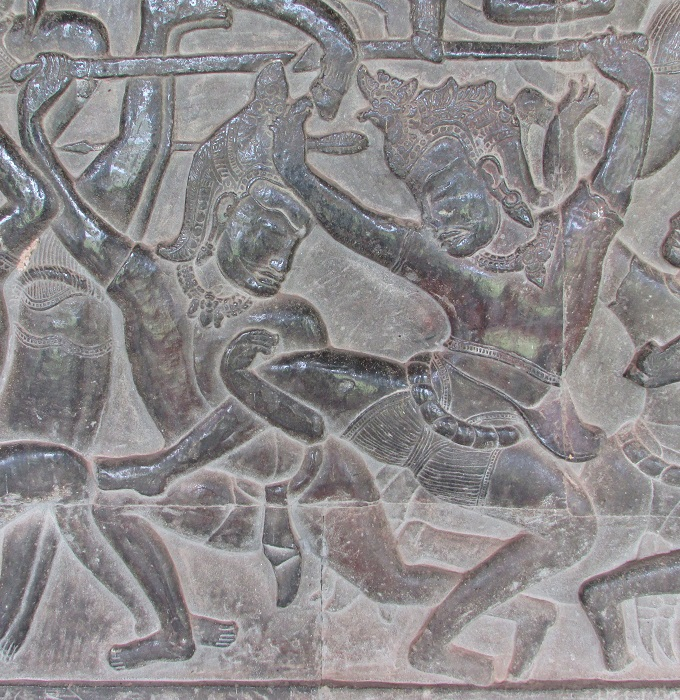
Bas-relief of intercepting a kick

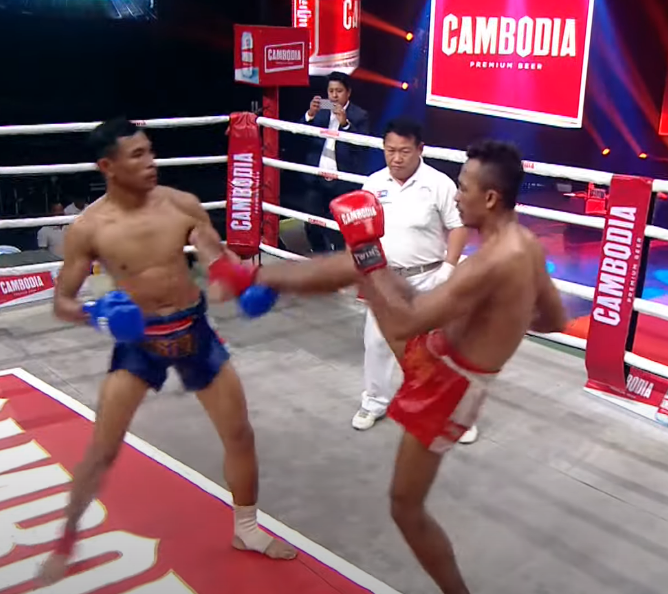
Intercepting a kick in Cambodian boxing match

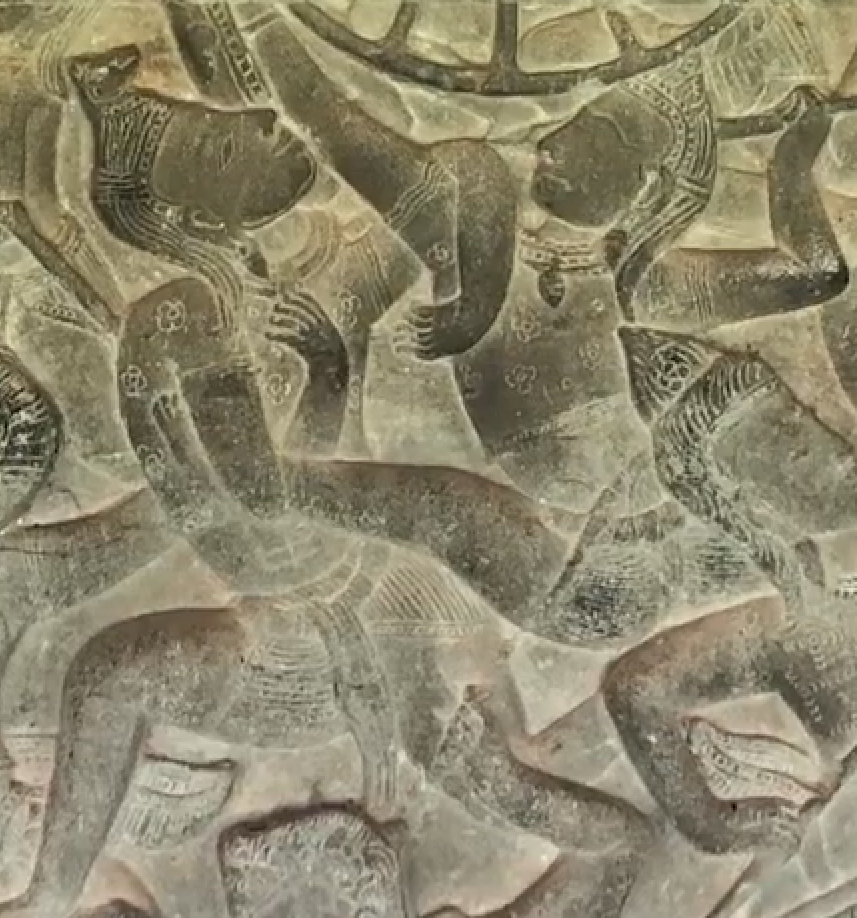
Elbow attack and intercepting a kick. Bas-relief at Angkor Wat(1100s)

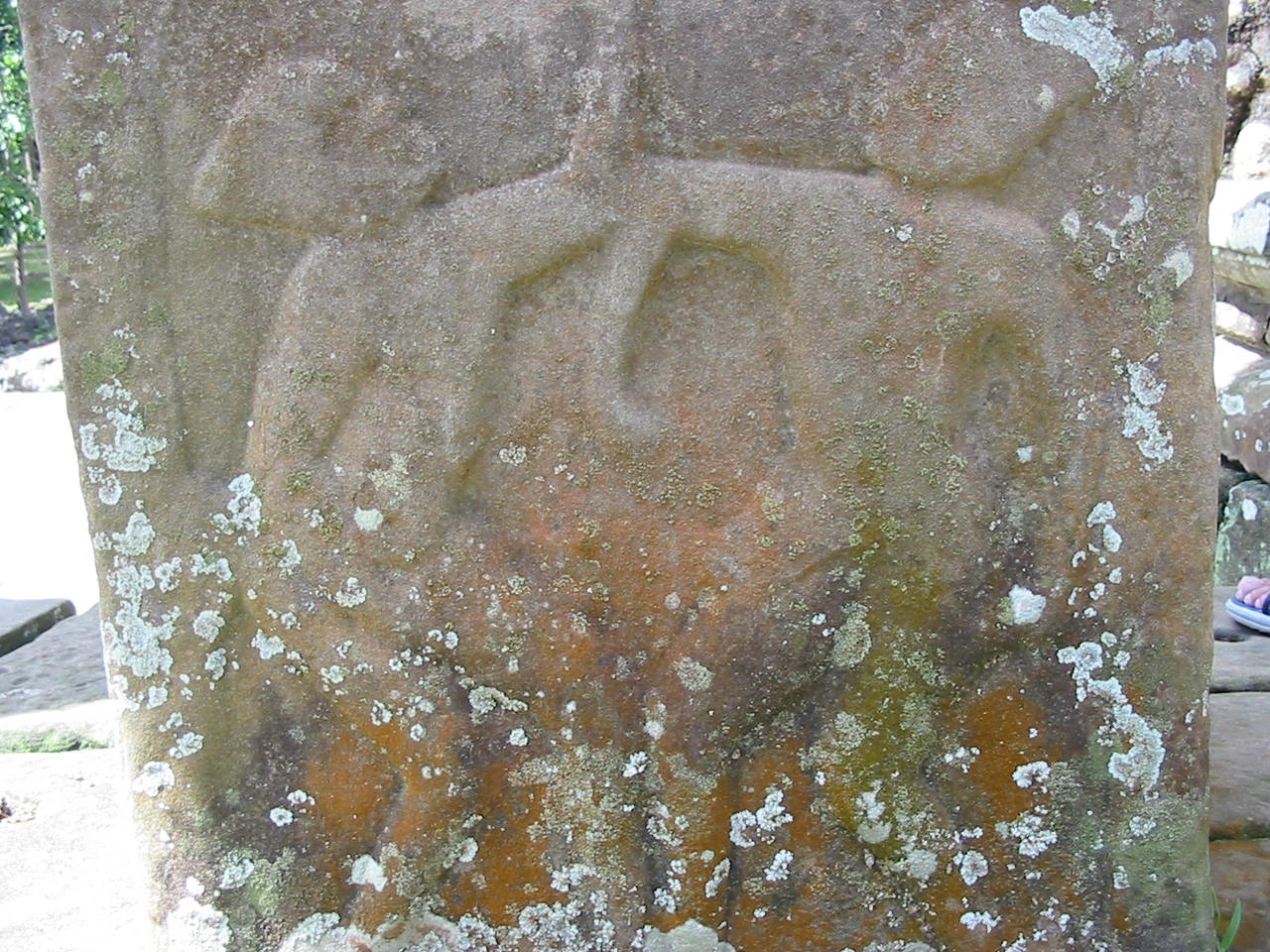
Bas-relief from the entrance pillars of the Bayon of elbow attacks

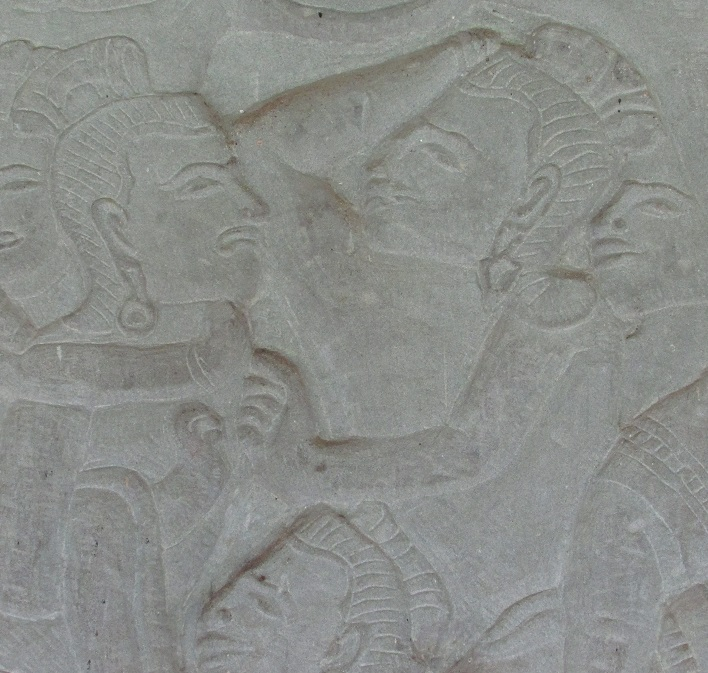
Elbow strike in Khmer martial art

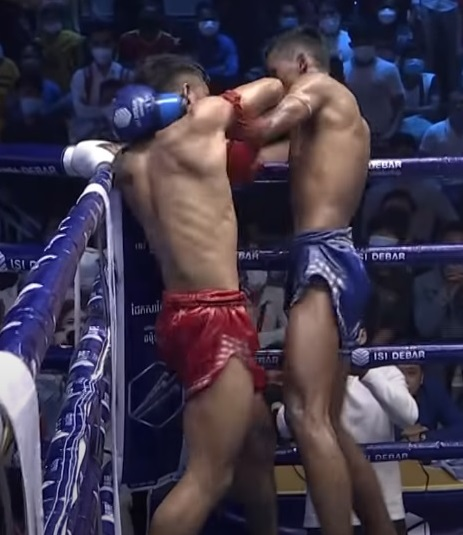
Elbow strike in Kun Khmer match

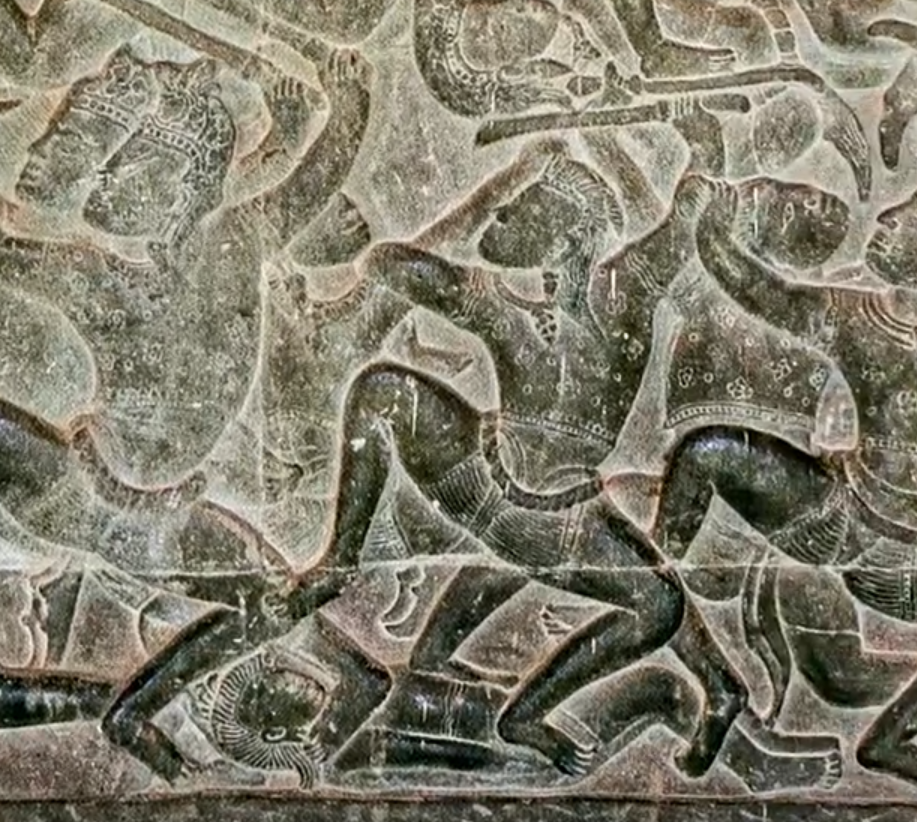
Elbow to the jaw and knee attack. Bas-relief at Angkor Wat(1100s)

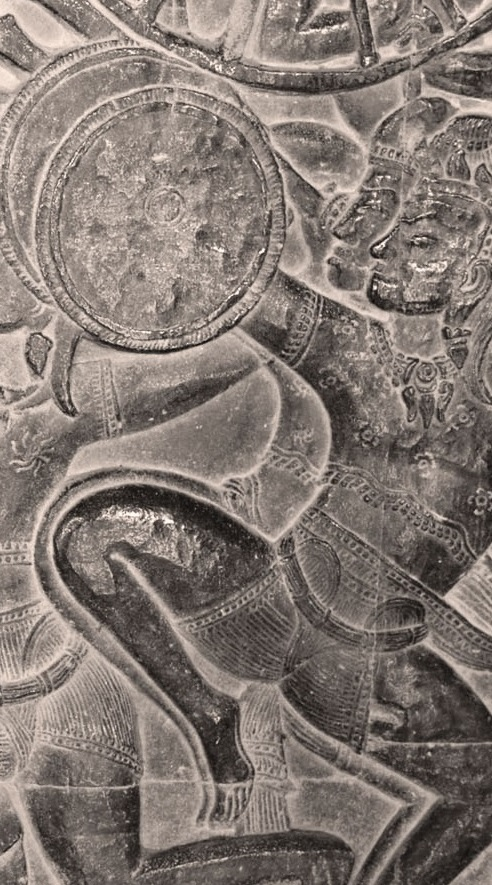
Knee technique at Angkor Wat(1100s)

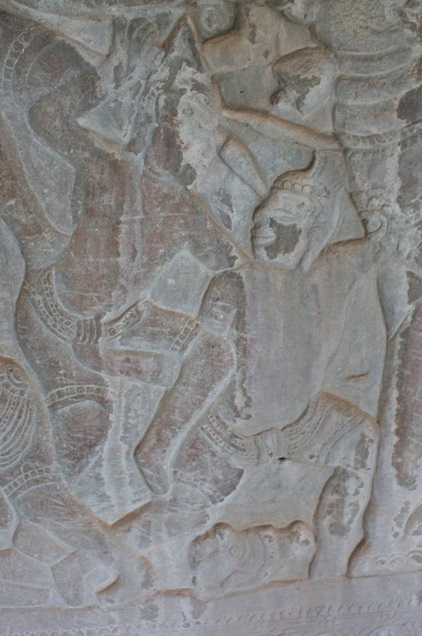
Flying knee and elbow technique used in Khmer martial arts

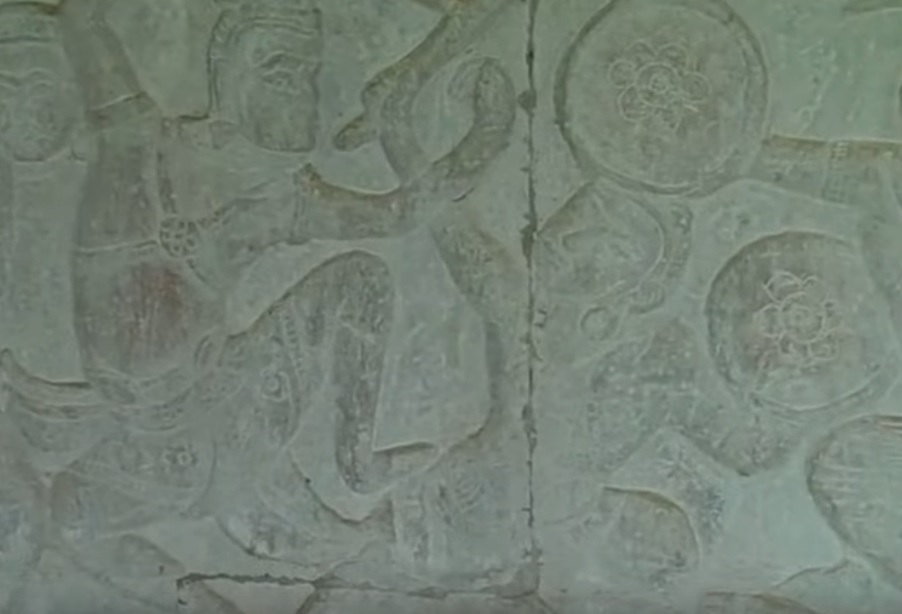
Knee attack and punches. Bas-relief at Angkor Wat(1100s)

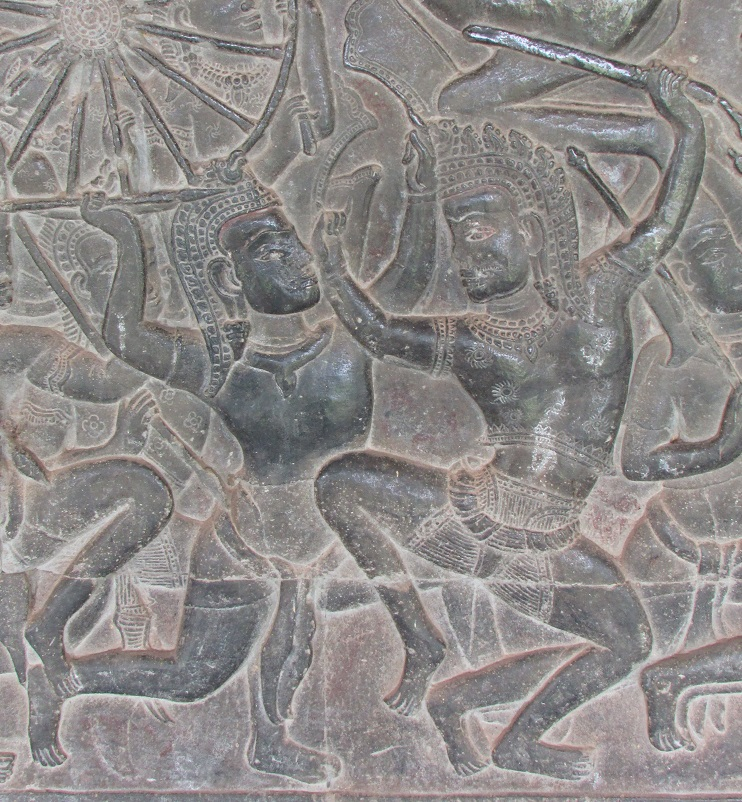
Knee and uppercut strike

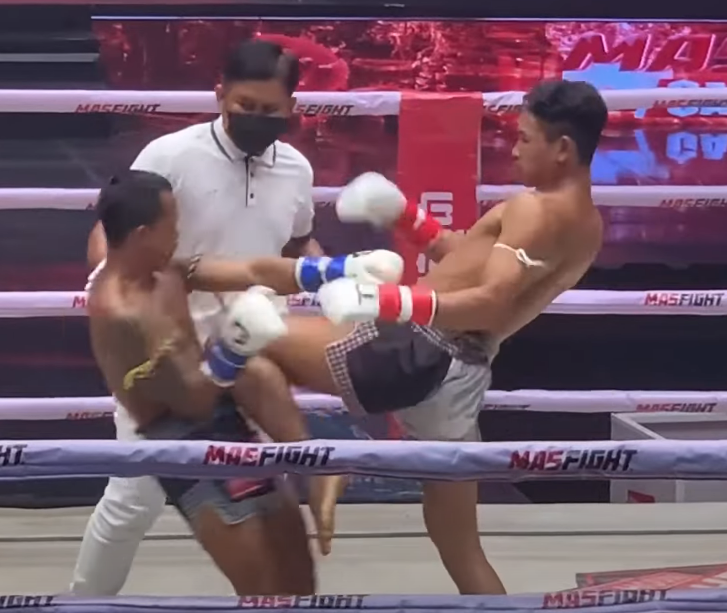
A knee strike during a match

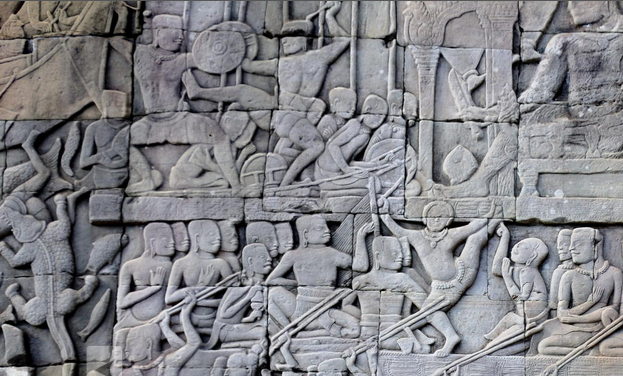
Bas-relief at the Bayon(12th/13th century). In the upper left corner, a martial artist uses a thrust kick on his opponent. In the lower right corner, a martial artist demonstrates a high kick.

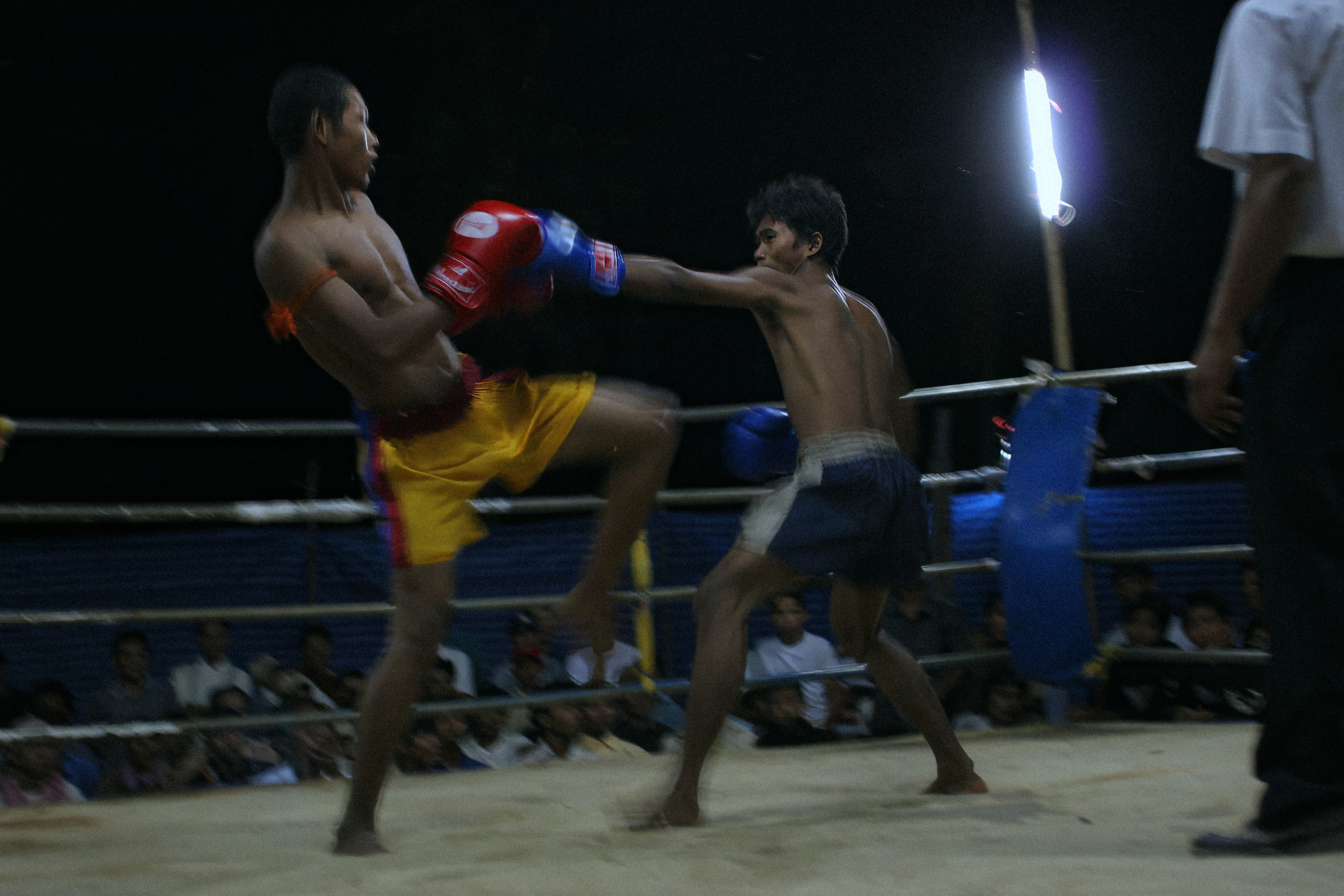
Kun Khmer match in a rural temple ring, Battambang (2006).

== See also ==
- Boxing
- Kickboxing
- Lethwei
- Muay Lao
- Boxe Française
- Shoot boxing
- Sikaran
- Khmer Traditional Wrestling
