= Kitti Sor.Jor.Danrayong =

Thai Muay Thai fighter

- Born: Tinnapop Saichon; August 3, 1997 (age 29); Chanthaburi Province, Thailand
- Other names: Kitti Taksinrayong School; Kitti SorTor.ManRayong
- Nationality: (Thailand) Thai
- Height: 1.82 m (5 ft 11 1/2 in)
- Weight: 75 kg (165 lb; 12 st)
- Division: Light middleweight Middleweight
- Style: Muay Thai
- Team: Sor.Jor.Danrayong
- Years active: 2015 – present

Kickboxing record
- Total: 96
- Wins: 85
- Losses: 11
- Last updated on: January 2, 2022

Kitti Sor.Jor.Danrayong (Thai: กิตติ ส.จ.แดนระยอง; born August 3, 1999) is a Thai Muay Thai fighter from the Chanthaburi Province in Eastern Thailand. Kitti is known for his emphasis of elbows as part of his fighting style.

He currently competes for Thai Fight, where he has won two titles with the promotion.

== Titles and accomplishments ==
- Thai Fight
  - 2019 THAI FIGHT 70 kg Kard Chuek King's Cup Champion
  - 2021 THAI FIGHT 70 kg Kard Chuek King's Cup Champion
- Max Muay Thai
  - 2017 Max Muay Thai 69 kg Tournament Champion

== Fight record ==
Muay Thai record
91 Wins, 11 Losses
Date	Result	Opponent	Event	Location	Method	Round	Time
2023-02-26	Win	(Israel) Elad Suman	Thai Fight KonlakPathum	Pathum Thani province, Thailand	Decision	3	3:00
2022-12-24	Win	(Thailand) Jaipetch Sitjaopho	Thai Fight: Metropolitan Police Bureau 100th Anniversary	Bangkok, Thailand	Decision	3	3:00
2022-11-20	Win	(France) Logan Andoche	THAI FIGHT Vana Nava Hua Hin	Hua Hin district, Thailand	KO (Elbows)	2	
2022-10-16	Win	(Brazil) Emerson Bento	THAI FIGHT Vajiravudh	Bangkok, Thailand	Decision	3	3:00
2022-05-29	Win	(Iran) Mikaeil Amiri	THAI FIGHT Nakhon Sawan	Nakhon Sawan province, Thailand	KO (Elbow)	2	
2022-05-08	Win	(Argentina) Lautaro Pereyra	THAI FIGHT Sung Noen	Sung Noen district, Thailand	KO	1	
2022-03-20	Win	(Brazil) Thiago Teixeira	THAI FIGHT Lampang	Lampang, Thailand	Decision	3	3:00
2021-12-19	Win	(Brazil) Thiago Teixeira	THAI FIGHT Khao Aor	Phatthalung, Thailand	Decision	3	3:00
Wins THAI FIGHT 70kg Kard Chuek King's Cup title.
2021-07-04	Win	(Russia) Vladimir Shuliak	THAI FIGHT Strong	Pattaya, Thailand	TKO (Referee stoppage)	2	
2021-04-25	Win	(Iran) Reza Ahmadnezhad	THAI FIGHT DMHTT	Samut Sakhon, Thailand	KO (Left knee to the body)	2	
2021-04-03	Win	(Belgium) Erik Massion	THAI FIGHT Nan	Nan, Thailand	KO (Elbow & punches)	1	
2020-11-07	Win	(Brazil) Victor Hugo	THAI FIGHT Korat	Nakhon Ratchasima, Thailand	TKO (3 Knockdowns)	1	
2020-10-17	Win	(Brazil) Nata Gomes	THAI FIGHT Begins	Nonthaburi, Thailand	TKO (3 Knockdowns)	1	
2020-09-19	Win	(Russia) Ruslan Ataev	THAI FIGHT New Normal	Bangkok, Thailand	KO (Elbow)	1	
2019-12-21	Win	(Peru) Gabriel Mazzetti	THAI FIGHT Patong	Phuket, Thailand	Decision	3	3:00
Wins THAI FIGHT 70kg Kard Chuek King's Cup title.
2019-11-23	Win	(Iran) Hamed Soleimani	THAI FIGHT Mae Sot	Tak, Thailand	KO (Body Kick)	1	
2019-10-26	Win	(France) Mehdi Jaouadi	THAI FIGHT Bangsaen	Chonburi, Thailand	KO (Elbow)	1	
2019-08-24	Win	(Peru) Sergio Mazzetti	THAI FIGHT Kham Chanod	Udon Thani, Thailand	TKO (Doctor Stoppage)	2	
2019-06-29	Win	(Italy) Leonardo Giosi	THAI FIGHT Betong	Betong, Thailand	KO (Elbow)	2	
2019-04-27	Win	(Russia) Nikita Gerasimovich	THAI FIGHT Samui	Ko Samui, Thailand	TKO	2	
2019-03-30	Win	(Estonia) Andi Uustalu	THAI FIGHT Mueang Khon	Nakhon Si Thammarat, Thailand	TKO (Knees & Elbows)	2	
2019-02-23	Win	(Brazil) Alex Sousa	THAI FIGHT Phuket 2019	Phuket, Thailand	KO (Elbow)	1	
2018-12-22	Win	(Italy) Pasquale Amoroso	THAI FIGHT Nakhon Ratchasima	Nakhon Ratchasima, Thailand	TKO (Punches)	1	
2018-11-24	Win	(Russia) Anton Tolkmit	THAI FIGHT Saraburi	Saraburi, Thailand	TKO (Punches)	1	
2018-10-21	Win	(Iran) Hassan Vahdanirad	Super Champ Muay Thai	Bangkok, Thailand	KO	2	2:55
2018-09-23	Win	(United States) Thomas Hayden	Super Champ Muay Thai	Bangkok, Thailand	TKO	2	2:00
2018-08-26	Win	(Iran) Nima Vakilitamougheh	Super Champ Muay Thai	Bangkok, Thailand	KO	1	2:01
2018-07-29	Win	(Netherlands) Sven Van Hof	Super Champ Muay Thai	Bangkok, Thailand	TKO	2	0:00
2018-05-06	Win	(Cambodia) Thoeun Theara	Max Muay Thai	Pattaya, Thailand	KO (Knees)	2	2:58
2018-01-05	Win	(Thailand) Chokchai Pran26	Max Muay Thai	Thailand	Decision	3	3:00
2017-11-26	Win	(Wales) Luke Bar	Max Muay Thai	Pattaya, Thailand	Decision	3	3:00
2017-07-22	Win	(Thailand) Daomangkorn Kaisansukgym	Max Muay Thai	Pattaya, Thailand	TKO	2	
Wins MAX Muay Thai 69kg title.
2017-07-22	Win	(Thailand) Petmeechai Petcharoen	Max Muay Thai	Pattaya, Thailand	TKO (Elbow)	1	
2017-06-06	Win	(France) Valentin Thibaut	Max Muay Thai	Pattaya, Thailand	Decision	3	3:00
2016-07-31	Loss	(Thailand) Phetnarin Gluerare 1T	Rangsit Stadium	Rangsit, Thailand	Decision	5	3:00
2016-06-26	Win	(Thailand) Phetnarin Gluerare 1T	Rajadamnern Stadium	Bangkok, Thailand	Decision	5	3:00
2016-01-02	Win	(Thailand) Petchsingha Nitipattanaikwam	Omnoi Stadium	Thailand	Decision	5	3:00
2015-11-04	Win	(Thailand) Nongbenz Singtaladthai	Rajadamnern Stadium	Bangkok, Thailand	Decision	5	3:00
2015-10-08	Win	(Thailand) Lukyod Sitthidanan	Rajadamnern Stadium	Bangkok, Thailand	Decision	5	3:00
2015-09-16	Loss	(Thailand) Sakmongkol Sor.Sommai	Rajadamnern Stadium	Bangkok, Thailand	Decision	5	3:00
Legend: Win Loss Draw/No contest Notes
