= Thoeun Theara =

Cambodian Kun Khmer fighter

Thoeun Theara ធឿន ធារ៉ា
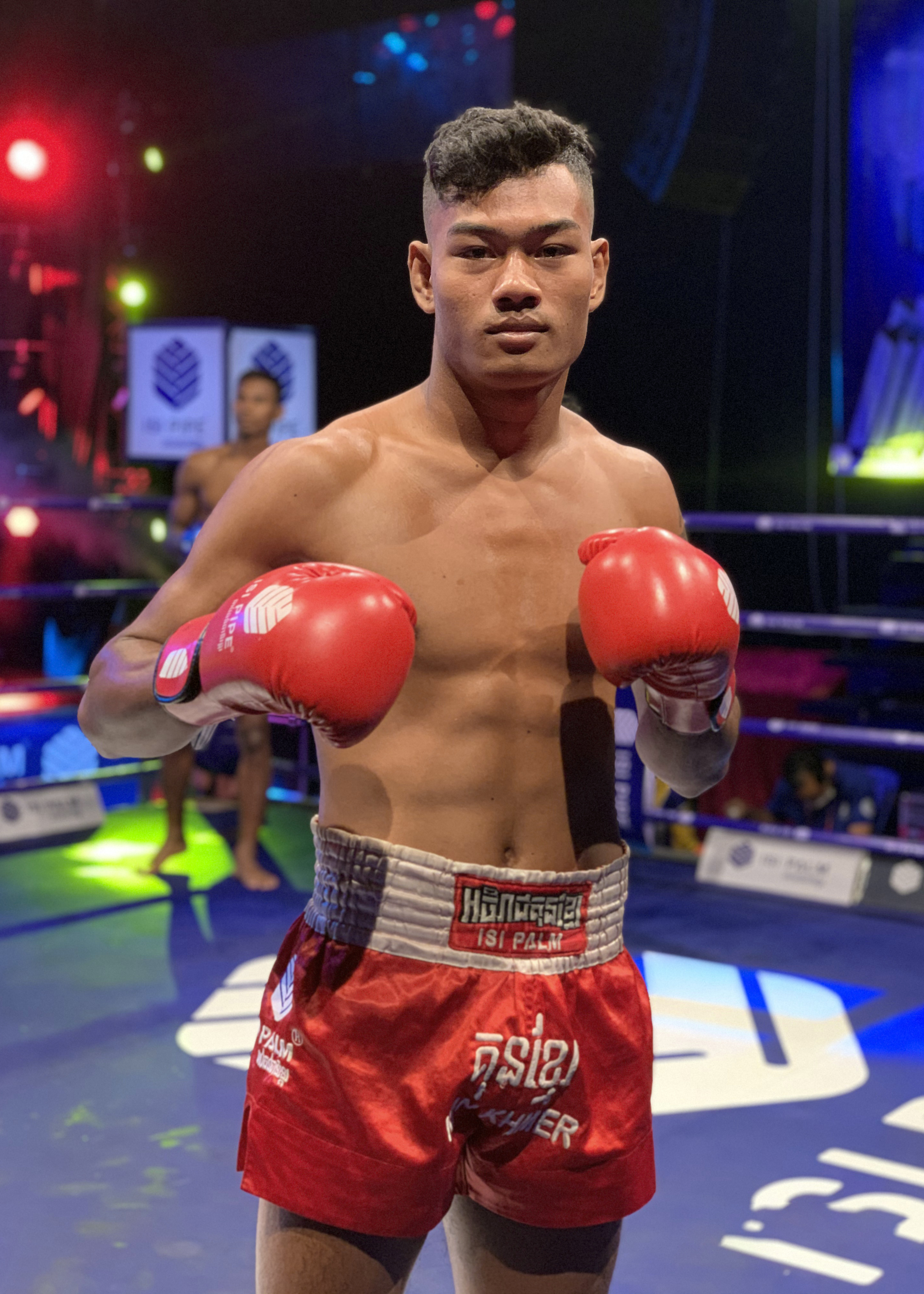
- Born: 5 May 1996 (age 30); Prey Veng province, Cambodia
- Height: 1.75 m (5 ft 9 in)
- Weight: 72 kg (159 lb; 11 st 5 lb)
- Style: Kun Khmer, Kickboxing
- Team: Koh Kong Provincial Martial Arts Association
- Trainer: Eh Phouthong
- Years active: 2017–present

Kickboxing record
- Total: 164
- Wins: 122
- By knockout: 70
- Losses: 33
- Draws: 09

Thoeun Theara (born 5 May 1996) is a Cambodian Kun Khmer fighter and kickboxer. The Kampuchea Thmey Daily previously listed him as a top 10 Kun Khmer boxer in early 2023. The Kampuchea Thmey Daily listed him as a top 10 Kun Khmer boxer for 2024. In 2023, Thoeun Theara won an 8-man tournament and a car. In 2024, Thoeun Theara won an 8-man tournament for the second time and a villa. He also had an undefeated record in 2024. Theara is considered one of the most successful fighters in Kun Khmer.

In 2022, he rose to fame after becoming the first Cambodian boxer to win a title at a Thai Fight event when he won the Thai Fight Kard Chuek 72.5 kg King's Cup Championship by technical knockout against Thai star Saiyok Pumpanmuang in Thailand. After defeating Saiyok Pumpanmuang and Beckham Banchamek, the World Muaythai Organization (WMO) ranked Theara #1 in the world Muaythai middleweight rankings (72.5 kg) category.

== Early life and personal life ==
Thoeun Theara was born in the Prey Veng province in Cambodia. He spent years working as a labourer in Thailand with his parents. In 2013, when Theara was 15, after a visit to his hometown in Prey Veng with his parents, the family moved back to Cambodia and worked for a brick making business nearby Phnom Penh.

Thoeun Theara is trained by Coach Eh Phouthong who received his training at the National Defense Council Center under Coach Chhit Sarim.

== Career ==
In 2018, Theara was selected for the Kun Khmer National Team.

On 16 July 2023, for his return to the ring after breaking his right arm in April 2023, Theara defeated Romanian Alex Bublea, at the 72 kg weight class to win the Techo Santepheap Kun Khmer World Championship belt. 500,000 viewers watched the live stream of the event on social media.

On 1 January 2023, after he defeated two top ranked Muaythai fighters in Saiyok Pumpanmuang and Beckham Banchamek, the World Muaythai Organization (WMO) recognized Kun Khmer and put Theara in first place in the world ranking 72.5 kg weight category, becoming the first Kun Khmer athlete to be recognized by the World Muaythai Organization (WMO).

On 5 November 2023, Theara faced Brazilian Daniel Torres and won by KO.

On 23 November 2023, Theara competed and won the 72kg Kun Khmer 8 MEN Tournament IPCC Kun Khmer World Champion in Phnom Penh and got a pickup car from Ganzberg. Thoeun Theara met with Brazilian boxer Bento in the final of the 8 man tournament and defeated the Brazilian player in the first round. After the knockout loss in Cambodia, Bento was striped of his Rajadamnern middleweight title. Joe Ryan fought Petchmai and claimed the vacant Rajadamnern Stadium middleweight title.

In a South Korean Kun Khmer event, Thoeun Theara is scheduled to fight Victor Teixeira, a Brazilian world champion who notably defeated Kongthailand Kiatnavy at ONE Friday Fight 20. Thoeun Theara knocked out Brazilian champion Victor Teixeira in the third round.

In 2024, Theara was included in the Forbes list 30 under 30 Asia in the Sports & Entertainment 2024.

On 16 November 2024, Thoeun Theara competed in an eight-man tournament. In the finals, he fought Australian fighter, Matthew. In the 3rd round, Thoeun Theara used an elbow against the Australian athlete causing referee Lao Sinat to stop the match. Thoeun Theara bowed to his teacher, Eh Phouthong, and won a villa for the match.

== Martial arts lineage ==
Achar Chhit Sarim -> Kru Eh Phouthong -> Thoeun Theara

== Championships and accomplishments ==
- Forbes 30 under 30 Asia - Sports & Entertainment 2024

Kun Khmer

- Techo Santepheap Kun Khmer World Champion 72 kg Championship belt
- Krud Kun Khmer 72 kg Championship belt
- IPCC International 72 kg World Championship
- IPCC Kun Khmer World Champion (Kun Khmer 8 Men Tournament)
  - Fight Clubbing Kun Khmer World Middleweight (-74kg) Champion

Muaythai

- Thai Fight Kard Chuek 72.5 kg King's Cup Championship

== Fight record ==
123 wins (70 (T)KOs), 33 losses, 9 draws
Date	Result	Opponent	Event	Location	Method	Round	Time
24 November 2026		(Morocco) Sabri Hamza	GANZBERG KUN KHMER	Cambodia			
18 October 2026	Win	(Senegal) Abdoulaye Diallo	Fight Clubbing 44	Siem Reap, Cambodia	Decision (Unanimous)	3	3:00
Wins the Fight Clubbing Kun Khmer World Middleweight (-74kg) title.
8 August 2026	Win	(Morocco) Ben Hammou	WURKZ	Phnom Penh, Cambodia	TKO	3	2:24
5 July 2026	Win	(Uzbekistan) Karimov Karim	Ganzberg Golden Boy Kun Khmer	Phnom Penh, Cambodia	TKO	2	1:05
20 January 2026	Loss	(Azerbaijan) Ruslan Nagiyev	Ganzberg World Kun Khmer 2026	Phnom Penh, Cambodia	KO (Spinning back kick)	1	3:00
6 November 2025	Loss	(Belarus) Pavel Grishanovich	Amazing Kunkhmer Festival	Phnom Penh, Cambodia	Decision	3	3:00
26 September 2025	Loss	(Azerbaijan) Ruslan Nagiyev	Town Boxing	Phnom Penh, Cambodia	KO (eye injury)	1	0:46
3 July 2025	Win	(Uganda) Umar Semata	Ganzberg Golden Boy Kun Khmer	Phnom Penh, Cambodia	Decision	3	3:00
4 May 2025	Win	(Senegal) Abdoulaye Diallo	Wurkz Kun Khmer Warriors	Phnom Penh, Cambodia	Decision	3	3:00
14 April 2025	Win	(Portugal) Lucas Carlos Da Silva	Town Boxing	Prey Veng Province, Cambodia	TKO	1	0:17
17 November 2024	Win	(Australia) Stevens Matthew	Town Boxing	Phnom Penh, Cambodia	TKO	3	1:32
15 September 2024	Win	(Brazil) Victor Teixeira	Ganzberg Kun Khmer to the World Class	Ansan, South Korea	KO	3	2:35
8 August 2024	Win	(Dominican Republic) Edye Ruiz	Town Boxing	Phnom Penh, Cambodia	KO	2	0:00
15 May 2024	Win	(China) Ji Long Theng	Town Boxing	Phnom Penh, Cambodia	KO	1	00:05
13 April 2024	Win	(Russia) Podgornov Andrei	Town Boxing	Kampong Cham, Cambodia	KO	1	00:30
14 March 2024	Win	(Belarus) Pavel Grishanovich	Town Boxing, Final	Phnom Penh, Cambodia	Decision	3	
14 March 2024	Win	(South Korea) Kim Hyunjun	Town Boxing, Semifinals	Phnom Penh, Cambodia	KO	1	1:30
19 January 2024	Win	(China) Jiao Zhou	Ganzberg Kun Khmer-Kungfu	Phnom Penh, Cambodia	KO	1	2:50
31 December 2023	Win	(Morocco) Sofian	Champion Kun Khmer	Phnom Penh, Cambodia	TKO	3	1:00
14 December 2023	Draw	(Iran) Hassan Vahdani	Bayon TV Boxing	Phnom Penh, Cambodia	Draw	3	
5 November 2023	Win	(Brazil) Daniel Torres	Wurkz Kun Khmer Warriors	Phnom Penh, Cambodia	KO	2	1:42
20 October 2023	Win	(Iran) Aboofazei Goodarzi	Kubota Kun Khmer Champion	Phnom Penh, Cambodia	KO	2	1:10
10 September 2023	Win	(Belarus) Nikita Gerasisimovich	Kun Khmer Grand Champion	Phnom Penh, Cambodia	TKO	2	0:25
16 July 2023	Win	(Romania) Alex Bublea	Techo Santepheap Kun Khmer World Champion	Phnom Penh, Cambodia	TKO	1	0:50
8 April 2023	Win	(Thailand) Kangmuang Chhang	Wurkz World Kun Khmer Fight	Kampot, Cambodia	Decision	3	03:00
18 March 2023	Win	(Thailand) Sammy Banchamek	Krud Kun Khmer Fight	Cambodia	Decision	5	3:00
26 February 2023	Win	(Morocco) Oussama Elkouche	Bayon TV Boxing	Phnom Penh, Cambodia	KO	2	00:52
18 February 2023	Win	(Cambodia) Chhoeung Lvai	Krud Championship Match	Phnom Penh, Cambodia	KO	1	00:50
18 February 2023	Win	(Thailand) Petchmai	Krud Championship Semi-Final	Phnom Penh, Cambodia	KO	1	00:07
11 February 2023	Win	(Brazil) Thiago Teixeira	IPCC World Champion Kun Khmer	Svay Rieng, Cambodia	KO	4	00:06
29 January 2023	Draw	(Thailand) Sammy Banchamek	Krud Kun Khmer	Phnom Penh, Cambodia	Draw	5	
14 January 2023	Win	(Thailand) Kongthailand Kiatnavy	PNN Sports	Phnom Penh, Cambodia	TKO	5	
31 December 2022	Win	(Thailand) Beckham Banchamek	Wurkz Kun Khmer	Phnom Penh, Cambodia	Decision	3	3:00
24 December 2022	Win	(Thailand) Saiyok Pumpanmuang	Thai Fight Champion - King Rama X	Bangkok, Thailand	TKO	1	2:42
20 November 2022	Win	(Russia) Yurik Davtyan	Thai Fight	Thailand	TKO	1	
22 October 2022	Win	(Thailand) Petchmai	International friendly match TUK Fighter	Phnom Penh, Cambodia	Decision	3	
23 September 2022	Loss	(Thailand) Thananchai Sitsongpeenong	RWS: Rajadamnern World Series	Bangkok, Thailand	Decision	3	
4 September 2022	Win	(Thailand) Detrit Sathian	PNN Boxing	Phnom Penh, Cambodia	TKO	3	
25 July 2022	Win	(Thailand) Payak Samui	Kun Khmer Allstar	Phnom Penh, Cambodia	Decision	3	3:00
2 July 2022	Win	(Thailand) Fahpayak Suekblack	Town Boxing	Prey Veng, Cambodia	TKO	2	2:00
25 June 2022	Draw	(Thailand) Satanfah Rachanon	IPCC Kun Khmer	Svay Rieng, Cambodia	Draw	3	
15 May 2022	Loss	(Argentina) Ricardo Bravo	Titans Neos 30	Tokyo, Japan	KO/TKO	2	2:32
25 March 2022	Win	(Thailand) Yodkhunpon Sitmonchai	Kun Khmer All Star 3	Phnom Penh, Cambodia	KO	1	0:50
2 October 2021	Loss	(Cambodia) Prom Samnang	CNC Boxing	Phnom Penh, Cambodia	Decision	5	3:00
31 July 2021	Loss	(Cambodia) Lao Chantrea	CNC Boxing	Phnom Penh, Cambodia	KO	2	0:18
14 January 2021	Win	(Cambodia) Chhoeung Lvai	Madrid Kun Khmer	Phnom Penh, Cambodia	Decision	5	
14 December 2020	Win	(Laos) Thunsaphun	International friendly match CTN Boxing	Phnom Penh, Cambodia	KO	3	01:04
28 November 2020	Win	(Cambodia) Em Lengly	Bayon TV Boxing	Phnom Penh, Cambodia	Decision	5	
26 September 2020	Win	(Cambodia) Long Sovandoeun	CNC Boxing	Phnom Penh, Cambodia	Decision	5	
28 June 2020	Draw	(Cambodia) Roeung Sophorn	CNC Boxing	Phnom Penh, Cambodia	Decision	5	
14 June 2020	Loss	(Cambodia) Lao Chantrea	CNC Boxing	Phnom Penh, Cambodia	Decision	5	
30 May 2020	Draw	(Cambodia) Roeung Sophorn	CNC Boxing	Phnom Penh, Cambodia	Decision	5	
23 May 2020	Win	(Cambodia) Long Sovandoeun	CNC Boxing	Phnom Penh, Cambodia	Decision	5	
14 April 2019	Win	(Thailand) Boonlong Puyfourman	Max Muay Thai Ultimate	Bangkok, Thailand	KO	3	1:35
24 February 2019	Loss	(Wales) Luke Bar	Max Muay Thai Ultimate	Bangkok, Thailand	Decision	3	
6 May 2018	Loss	(Thailand) Kitti Sor.Jor.Danrayong	Max Muay Thai Ultimate	Bangkok, Thailand	KO	2	00:10
27 March 2018	Win	(Thailand) Petchtongchai Sor Seubsak	Max Muay Thai Ultimate	Bangkok, Thailand	KO	2	0:25
26 March 2018	Win	(Thailand) Numkabuan Kiatnavy	Max Muay Thai Ultimate	Bangkok, Thailand	KO	2	0:38
27 January 2018	Win	(France) Julien	CNC Boxing	Phnom Penh, Cambodia	Decision	3	
Legend: Win Loss Draw/No contest Notes
