= Fabio Pinca =

Italian-French Muay Thai kickboxer and mixed martial arts (MMA) fighter

- Born: June 14, 1984 (age 42); Lyon, France
- Nationality: French and Italian
- Height: 1.75 m (5 ft 9 in)
- Weight: 70 kg (154 lb; 11 st)
- Division: Welterweight
- Style: Muay Thai
- Fighting out of: Saint-Fons, Lyon, France
- Team: St. Fons Team Nasser K.
- Trainer: Nasser Kacem
- Years active: 2000–present

Kickboxing record
- Total: 128
- Wins: 100
- By knockout: 35
- Losses: 24
- By knockout: 1
- Draws: 4

Mixed martial arts record
- Total: 1
- Wins: 0
- Losses: 1
- By decision: 1
- Last updated on: August 26, 2020

Fabio Pinca (born June 14, 1984) is an Italian-French Muay Thai kickboxer and mixed martial artist. Pinca is currently signed to ONE Championship. In 2010, Pinca became the first winner of the annual Thai Fight tournament.

== Biography ==
Fabio Pinca was born on 14 June 1984. Pinca resides in Lyon, France and trains at Gym boxing St Fons in Saint-Fons, Lyon. His trainer is Nasser Kacem.

Fabio began training in Muaythai at the age of 15. He discovered Muaythai while watching a video tape from Thailand. Boxers who inspired Pinca were Ramon Dekkers, Dany Bill, Saimai and Farid Villaume. By learning about a club near his home, he found the Boxing Gym St-Fons who already had good boxers.

He began training in Muay Thai in Saint-Fons. Following his first match, he continued his development at the same club, citing the quality of the local sparring partners and the coaching staff as reasons for his tenure there.

Fabio Pinca has a job as an educational facilitator in his city with a flexible schedule which allows him to focus on his athletic career.

In March 2014, Fabio Pinca became an event organiser and created his own promotion called STRIKE FIGHT. The first event will held in his native city Lyon in France on June 27, 2014.

== Career ==
Fabio Pinca fought in Muaythai and kickboxing, but his preference is for Muaythai because he is passionate about the sport and Thai culture. He likes to use his elbows and knees.

In 2004 he was French Muay Thai Champion Class B and wins World Muaythai Championships bronze medal. In 2005 he reached the finals of French Muay Thai Championship Class A. In 2006 he became WPKC European Kickboxing Champion. In 2008 he won the Fighting Day 8 Thai Boxing 4 Men tournament in Italy and he became WBC Intercontinental Muay Thai Lightweight Champion. In 2009 he became WBC World Muay Thai Champion and in 2010 he won the Isuzu Thai Fight -67 kg Tournament, defeating Youssef Boughanem in the tournament final.

Pinca has experience that belies his young age having fought Attachai, Bovy, Sudsakorn Sor Klinmee and the legendary Saenchai Sor Kingstar.

He faced Saiyok Pumpanmuang at Thai Fight: Lyon on September 19, 2012 in Lyon, France and lost via decision after three rounds.

Pinca fought Dutch-Turkish kickboxer Tayfun Ozcan at Time Fight 2 in Tours, France, on October 6, 2012. He battered his opponent with knee strikes from the Thai clinch and forced a stop to the bout in round three after breaking Ozcan's arm.

He faced Alessandro Campagna in a tournament reserve bout at Glory 3: Rome - 2012 Middleweight Slam Final 8 on November 3, 2012 in Rome, Italy, and lost via unanimous decision. He was docked a point in the third round for excessive clinching which is banned under kickboxing rules.

He bested Yakdam on points at La Nuit des Titans in Tours, France, on February 2, 2013.

A rematch between Fabio Pinca and Sitthichai Sitsongpeenong went down at Best of Siam 3 in Paris, France, on February 14, 2013 but he was unable to take his revenge as he lost a unanimous decision.

He fought Saenchai for the second time on 21 January 2012 at 'Yokkao Extreme' and won a controversial decision. Pinca struggled early on against Saenchai despite having a 12 kg weight advantage and took out his frustration with a headbutt on his opponent that went unpunished.

Pinca competed in the four man tournament at MAX Muay Thai 2 in Pattaya, Thailand on June 29, 2013. He caused an upset by outpointing Diesellek Aoodonmuang in the semi-finals but was then on the receiving end of one when he lost a decision to Victor Nagbe in the final.

He beat Malaipet Sasiprapa by unanimous decision for the inaugural Lion Fight Welterweight Championship at Lion Fight 12 in Las Vegas on November 1, 2013.

He was set to fight Buakaw Banchamek for the vacant WMC World Junior Middleweight (-69.9 kg/154 lb) Championship Monte Carlo Fighting Masters 2014 in Monte Carlo, Monaco on June 14, 2014 but withdrew after being injured in his bout with Thongchai Sitsongpeenong and was replaced by Djime Coulibaly.

Pinca challenged Rajadamnern Stadium 67 kg champion Manaowan Sitsongpeenong for his title on February 23, 2017 on the Best of Siam show taking place at the legendary Thai stadium. He won to take the biggest accolade of his Muay Thai career.

Pinca made his ONE Championship debut at ONE Championship: Heroes of Honor on April 20, 2018. He faced Nong-O Gaiyanghadao under ONE Super Series Muay Thai rules, losing by unanimous decision.

=== Mixed martial arts ===
Fabio Pinca was originally scheduled to make his mixed martial arts debut against fellow Muay Thai fighter Sagetdao Petpayathai at ONE Championship: Kingdom of Heroes on October 6, 2018. However, their fight was later pulled from the card.

He finally made his MMA debut at ONE Championship: No Surrender 3 on August 21, 2020. He lost to Shannon Wiratchai by split decision.

== Titles and achievements ==
=== Professional ===
- Rajadamnern Stadium
  - 2017 Rajadamnern Stadium Champion -67Kg
- International Sport Karate Association
  - 2016 ISKA World Welterweight Muay Thai Champion
- Kombat League
  - 2015 Kombat League World Champion MT -67 kg
- Lion Fight
  - 2013 Lion Fight Welterweight Championship
- MAX Muay Thai
  - 2013 MAX Muay Thai 2 Tournament runner-up
- WBC Muaythai
  - 2012 WBC World Muaythai Welterweight Champion (147 lbs/66.678 kg)
  - 2009 WBC World Muaythai Super Lightweight Champion (140 lbs/63.503 kg)
  - 2008 W.B.C. Intercontinental Muay Thai Lightweight Champion
- THAI FIGHT
  - 2011 THAI FIGHT Tournament runner up (-67 kg)
  - 2010 THAI FIGHT Tournament Champion (-67 kg)
- Nuit des Champions
  - 2008 Nuit des Champions Muaythai belt
- Fighting Day 8
  - 2008 Fighting Day 8 Thai Boxing 4 Men Tournament Champion (-64.500 kg)
- World Professional Kickboxing Council
  - 2006 WPKC European Kickboxing Champion
- Fédération française de kick boxing
  - 2005 French Muay Thai Vice Champion Class A (-63.500 kg)

=== Amateur ===
  - 2004 World Muay Thai Championships, Bangkok Thailand (bronze) (-63.500 kg)
  - 2004 French Muay Thai Champion Class B (-60 kg)
  - 2002 Junior French Muay Thai Champion
- Awards:
  - 2010 Muaythaitv Best Nakmuay of the Year

== Mixed martial arts record ==
Professional record breakdown
1 match	0 wins	1 loss
By decision	0	1

Res.	Record	Opponent	Method	Event	Date	Round	Time	Location	Notes
Loss	0–1	Shannon Wiratchai	Decision (split)	ONE: No Surrender 3	August 21, 2020	3	5:00	Bangkok, Thailand	

== Muay Thai and kickboxing record ==
Kickboxing record
100 wins (35 (T)KOs), 24 losses, 4 draws
Date	Result	Opponent	Event	Location	Method	Round	Time
2018-05-05	Win	(Thailand) Petsanguan	WARRIORS NIGHT 5	France	KO (left high kick)	2	1:40
2018-04-20	Loss	(Thailand) Nong-O Gaiyanghadao	ONE Championship: Heroes of Honor	Philippines	Decision (unanimous)	3	3:00
2017-10-28	Loss	(Uzbekistan) Anvar Boynazarov	Glory 47: Lyon	Lyon, France	KO (left hook)	2	1:52
2017-07-01	Win	(Thailand) Rungrat Pumpanmuang	Chook Muay	France	KO (left hook)	3	
2017-02-23	Win	(Thailand) Manaowan Sitsongpeenong	Best of Siam & Rajadamnern Stadium	Bangkok, Thailand	Decision	5	3:00
Wins the Rajadamnern Stadium Welterweight Title (147 lb)
2016-12-10	Win	(Morocco) Mosab Amrani	Glory 36: Oberhausen	Oberhausen, Germany	Decision (split)	3	3:00
2016-10-08	Win	(England) Liam Harrison	Yokkao 19	Bolton, England	Decision (unanimous)	5	3:00
2016-09-17	Win	(Belarus) Andrei Kulebin	Wicked One Duel	Paris, France	Decision (unanimous)	5	3:00
2016-07-02	Win	(China) Yang Zhuo	Glory of Heroes 3	Jiyuan, China	Decision (split)	3	3:00
2016-05-14	Win	(United Kingdom) Reece McAllister	The Tanko Main Event	Bolton，United Kingdom	Decision	5	3:00
Wins the vacant ISKA World Welterweight Muay Thai Championship.
2016-04-02	Loss	(China) Tie Yinghua	Glory of Heroes 2	Shenzhen, China	Decision (split)	3	3:00
2016-03-13	Win	(France) Azize Hlali	La Nuit des Titans	Tours, France	Decision (split)	5	3:00
2016-01-30	Win	(United Kingdom) Charlie Peters	Lion Fight 27	United States	Decision	5	3:00
Defended his Lion Fight Welterweight Belt
2015-11-21	Win	(France) Bobo Sacko	Warriors Night 4	Paris, France	Decision	5	3:00
2015-11-07	Win	(Spain) Edye Ruiz	Top Fight Madrid	Spain	Decision	3	3:00
2015-05-02	Win	(Italy) Mauro Serra	Kunlun Fight 24	Verona, Italy	KO	2	3:00
Wins Kombat League World Champion MT -67kg.
2014-02-08	Loss	(Thailand) Thongchai Sitsongpeenong	La Nuit Des Titans	Tours, France	Decision	5	3:00
2013-11-01	Win	(Thailand) Malaipet Sasiprapa	Lion Fight 12	Las Vegas, Nevada	Decision (unanimous)	5	3:00
Wins Lion Fight Welterweight title.
2013-10-11	Win	(France) Mehdi Zatout	WARRIORS NIGHT 2	France	Decision	5	3:00
2013-06-29	Loss	(Australia) Victor Nagbe	MAX Muay Thai 2, Final	Pattaya, Thailand	Decision	3	3:00
For the MAX Muay Thai Tournament Championship.
2013-06-29	Win	(Thailand) Diesellek Aoodonmuang	MAX Muay Thai 2, Semi Finals	Pattaya, Thailand	Decision	3	3:00
2013-05-11	Win	(France) Mickael Françoise	THE GAME	Saint-Denis, La Réunion	Decision	5	3:00
2013-02-14	Loss	(Thailand) Sitthichai Sitsongpeenong	Best of Siam 3	Paris, France	Decision (unanimous)	5	3:00
2013-02-02	Win	(Thailand) Yakdam	La Nuit des Titans	Tours, France	Decision	5	3:00
2012-11-02	Loss	(Italy) Alessandro Campagna	Glory 3: Rome - 70 kg Slam Tournament, Reserve Bout	Rome, Italy	Decision (unanimous)	3	3:00
2012-10-06	Win	(Turkey) Tayfun Ozcan	Time Fight 2	Tours, France	TKO (broken arm)	3	
2012-09-19	Loss	(Thailand) Saiyok Pumpanmuang	THAI FIGHT Lyon	Lyon, France	Decision	3	3:00
2012-06-09	Win	(Thailand) Big Ben Chor Praram 6	WBC Battle of the belts	Bangkok, Thailand	Decision	5	3:00
Wins WBC Muaythai Welterweight title (147 lbs/66.678 kg).
2012-05-26	Loss	(Italy) Giorgio Petrosyan	Glory 1: Stockholm - 70 kg Slam Tournament, First Round	Stockholm, Sweden	Decision (unanimous)	3	3:00
2012-03-17	Loss	(Thailand) Eakpracha Meenayothin	La Nuit des Titans	Tours, France	Decision	5	3:00
2012-01-21	Win	(Thailand) Saenchai Sinbimuaythai	Yokkao Extreme 2012	Milan, Italy	Decision	3	3:00
2011-12-18	Loss	(Thailand) Kem Sitsongpeenong	THAI FIGHT 2011 – 67 kg Tournament, Final	Bangkok, Thailand	Decision	3	3:00
Fight was for Thai Fight 2011 67kg Tournament title.
2011-11-27	Win	(Morocco) Mosab Amrani	THAI FIGHT 2011 67 kg Tournament, Semi Final	Bangkok, Thailand	Decision	3	3:00
2011-09-25	Win	(Japan) Yokoyama Shigeyuki	THAI FIGHT 2011 67 kg Tournament, Quarter Final	Bangkok, Thailand	Decision	3	3:00
2011-08-07	Win	(Japan) Yuya Yamato	THAI FIGHT EXTREME 2011: Japan	Ariake Coliseum, Japan	Decision	3	3:00
2011-07-17	Win	(China) Ding Ning	THAI FIGHT EXTREME 2011: Hong Kong	Hong Kong, China	TKO	2	
2011-05-14	Loss	(Japan) Yuya Yamato	THAI FIGHT EXTREME 2011: France	Cannes, France	TKO (elbow/cut)	2	
2010-12-06	Win	(Belgium) Youssef Boughanem	THAI FIGHT Final, Final	Korat, Thailand	Decision	3	3:00
Wins THAI FIGHT Tournament (-67 kg).
2010-12-06	Win	(Thailand) Petchmankong Petchfocus	THAI FIGHT Final 4, Semi Finals	Korat, Thailand	Decision	3	3:00
2010-10-25	Win	(Spain) Rafi Zouheir	THAI FIGHT Final 8	Bangkok, Thailand	Decision	3	3:00
2010-08-29	Win	(Italy) Sharos Huyer	THAI FIGHT Final 16	Bangkok, Thailand	KO	1	
2010-06-05	Win	(Thailand) Singmanee Sor Srisompong	La Nuit des Challenges 8	Lyon, Saint-Fons, France	Decision (unanimous)	5	3:00
2010-01-30	Loss	(Thailand) Sitthichai Sitsongpeenong	La Nuit des Titans, Semi Final	Tours, France	Decision	4	3:00
2009-11-28	Win	(Thailand) Danthai Siangmanasak	A1 Lyon	Lyon, France	TKO	3	
Wins W.B.C. World Muaythai title (-63.500 kg).
2009-11-14	Loss	(Thailand) Kem Sitsongpeenong	La Nuit des Champions 2009	Marseilles, France	Decision	5	3:00
Fight was for "Nuit des Champions" Muaythai belt (-67 kg).
2009-08-30	Draw	(Thailand) Danthai Siangmanasak	TV 7	Bangkok, Thailand	Decision	5	3:00
2009-06-20	Win	(Thailand) Nuetorani	Gala de Boxe Thai : Le Grand Défi	Levallois-Perret, France	KO (elbow)	3	
2009-05-16	Win	(France) Sabri Sahali	Légendes et Guerriers	Toulouse, France	TKO	2	
2009-03-26	Win	(Thailand) Bovy Sor Udomson	Les Stars du Ring	Levallois-Perret, France	Decision	5	3:00
2008-11-29	Win	(Thailand) Sudsakorn Sor Klinmee	La nuit des Champions 2008	Marseilles, France	TKO	5	
Wins "Nuit des Champions" Muaythai belt.
2008-11-08	Win	(Japan) Kenta	Janus Fight Night "The Legend"	Padua, Italy	Decision (unanimous)	5	3:00
2008-11-06	Win	(Netherlands) Hassan Ait Bassou	Muay Thaï à Levallois	Levallois-Perret, France	Decision	5	3:00
2008-07-19	Win	(Thailand) Kaensak Sor.Ploenjit	WCK: Full Rules Muay Thai, Pechanga Resort Casino	Temecula, CA	Decision (unanimous)	5	3:00
2008-06-12	Loss	(Thailand) Attachai Fairtex	Gala de Levallois	Levallois-Perret, France	Decision	5	3:00
2008-06-07	Win	(Thailand) Lempard Sor Khamsing	La Nuit des Challenges 5	Lyon, Saint-Fons, France	Decision (split)	5	3:00
2008-03-02	Win	(Italy) Riccardo Cumani	Fighting Day 8, Final	Imola, Italy	Decision	3	3:00
Wins Fighting Day 8 Thai Boxing 4 Men Tournament title (-64.500 kg).
2008-03-02	Win	(Italy) Gionata Zarbo	Fighting Day 8, Semi Final	Imola, Italy	TKO (doctor stoppage)	2	
2008-01-26	Loss	(Thailand) Danthai Siangmanasak	La Nuit des Titans 3	Tours, France	Decision	5	3:00
2007-11-17	Win	(France) Loris Audoui	La Nuit des Champions 2007	Marseilles, France	TKO (referee stoppage)	2	
2007-10-27	Loss	(Thailand) Attachai Fairtex	One Night in Bangkok	Antwerp, Belgium	Decision	5	3:00
2007-09-24	Loss	(Belarus) Alexander Himoroda	Kings of Muaythai : Belarus vs Europe	Minsk, Belarus	TKO (doctor stoppage)	3	
2007-09-08	Win	(Thailand) Kaensak Soh	WBC Muay Thai Presents: World Championship Muay Thai	Gardena, CA	Decision (split)	5	3:00
Wins W.B.C. Muay Thai International Lightweight title.
2007-06-16	Loss	(France) Karim Saada	La Nuit des Super Fights VIII	Paris, France	Decision (unanimous)	5	3:00
2007-05-26	Win	(Netherlands) Robert Van Nimwegen	Thai Boxe Mondiale : Abano Grand Prix	Italy	Decision	5	3:00
2007-04-21	Loss	(Thailand) Saenchai Sor Kingstar	Gala de Levallois-Perret	Levallois-Perret, France	Decision (unanimous)	5	3:00
2007-04-06	Loss	(Thailand) Sak Kaoponlek	Muay Thai: Kaoponlek VS Liam HARRISON	Italy	Decision	5	3:00
Fight was for M.T.A. World Muaythai title (-64 kg).
2006-12-09	Win	(Thailand) Sila Nakornparkview	Muay Thai in Action	Uster, Switzerland	Decision	5	3:00
2006-12-04	Win	(Thailand) Pichitchai Sorprapa	King's Anniversary	Bangkok, Thailand	Decision	5	3:00
2006-11-18	Win	(Thailand) Saksri	France vs Thaïlande	France	KO	2	
2006-07-21	Win	(Italy) Mohamed Essadiri	Fight Night IV	Pomezia, Italy	Decision	7	2:00
Wins W.P.K.C. European Kickboxing title.
2006-05-13	Win	(Thailand) Chonleak Kaewsamrit	Le Thaï Tournament II : France vs Thaïlande	Thônex, Switzerland	Decision	5	3:00
2006-03-02	Win	(Thailand) Honthong	Kickboxing : France vs Thaïlande	Levallois-Perret, France	Decision	5	2:00
2006-01-14	Win	(France) Totoff	La nuit des Superfights III	Villebon, France	Decision	5	3:00
2006-00-00	Win	(France) Raouf Beliouz	Gala à Tours	Tours, France	Decision	5	
2005-12-17	Win	(Spain) Antonio Raya	Gala de Badalona	Badalona, Spain	TKO (referee stoppage)	4	
2005-10-22	Win	(France) Totoff	La nuit des Superfights II	Villebon, France	Decision	5	3:00
2005-06-10	Win	(England) Mattew Jonstone	Muay Thai a Fiume Veneto	Fiume Veneto, Italy	KO	4	
2005-05-14	Loss	(France) Olivier Tchétché	French Championship 2005 Class A, Final	Paris, France	Decision (unanimous)	5	
Fight was for French Muay Thai Championship 2005 Class A title (-63.500 kg).
2005-04-30	Win	(United Kingdom) Gary Hamilton	Post Tenebra Cup 2005	Geneva, Switzerland	TKO	2	
2005-03-26	Win	(France) Mamadou Diabira	French Championship 2005 Class A, Semi Final	Paris, France	Decision	5	
2005-01-15	Win	(France) Stéphane Vincent	French Championship 2005 Class A, Quarter Final	Paris, France	KO	2	
2004-00-00	Loss	(Italy) Giorgio Petrosyan			Decision	5	3:00
2004-06-14	Loss	(United Kingdom) Gary Hamilton	Ulster Hall	Belfast, Northern Ireland	Decision	10	2:00
2003-07-26	Loss	(Italy) Andrea Ronchi	Best of the Best 2	Jesolo, Italy	Decision	5	
2003-07-13	Draw	(Spain) Mohamed El Idrissi	Vetllada en Hospitalet	Barcelona, Spain	Decision	5	2:00
Legend: Win Loss Draw/no contest Notes

Amateur record
Date	Result	Opponent	Event	Location	Method	Round	Time
2004-11-09	Loss	(Finland) Tommi Pitkälä	World Muaythai Championships 2004, Semi Final	Bangkok, Thailand	Decision	2	
Wins World Muaythai Championships 2004 bronze medal (-63.500 kg).
2004-11-07	Win	(Kazakhstan) Ondasyn Muzapparov	World Muaythai Championships 2004, 2nd Round	Bangkok, Thailand	TKO (low kick)	2	
2004-11-05	Win	(Iran) Chorder	World Muaythai Championships 2004, 1st Round	Bangkok, Thailand	TKO (referee stoppage)	2	
2004-04-24	Win	(France) Tarik Benshimed	French Muay Thai Championship 2004 Class B, Final	Paris, France	Decision	5	
Wins French Muay Thai Championship 2004 Class B title (-60 kg).
2004-01-17	Win	(France) Tommy Vatsana	French Championship 2004 Class B, Quarter Final	Paris, France			

== See also ==
- List of male kickboxers
