= Saensatharn P.K. Saenchai Muaythaigym =

Thai Muay Thai fighter

- Born: Suthiwat Chenphimai; August 21, 1993 (age 33); Khon Kaen, Thailand
- Other names: Saensatharn Klongsuanplu Resort, Saensatharn Sor Suradej
- Nationality: Thai
- Height: 183 cm (6 ft 0 in)
- Weight: 73 kg (161 lb; 11 st)
- Division: Middleweight; Welterweight
- Style: Muay Thai
- Fighting out of: Bangkok, Thailand
- Team: P.K. Saenchai Muaythai Gym

Kickboxing record
- Total: 177
- Wins: 141
- Losses: 31
- Draws: 5

Saensatharn P.K. Saenchai Muaythai Gym (Thai: แสนสะท้าน พี.เค.แสนชัยมวยไทยยิม; born August 21, 1993), also known as Saensatharn Sor Suradej, is a Thai Muay Thai fighter from the Khon Kaen province of Thailand. He is a former Lumpinee Stadium Light Welterweight Champion and World Muaythai Council World Welterweight Champion.

Saensatharn currently competes for the Thai Fight promotion, with whom he has won a title in 2017.

== Muay Thai career ==
On May 19, 2016, Saensatharn defeated Dylan Salvador in Paris by decision to win the WMC World Welterweight Championship.

=== 2017 ===
Saensatharn made his Thai Fight debut at THAI FIGHT Samui 2017 on April 29, 2017, facing Isuzu Cup Tournament winner Aroondej Petsupapan in the 2017 Isuzu Cup Superfight. He went on to win a three-round decision, landing himself a multi-fight deal with the Thai Fight promotion.

On December 23, 2017, Saensatharn defeated Walid Otmane at THAI FIGHT Chiang Mai in the semi-finals of the 2017 Thai Fight 70 kg King's Cup Tournament.

On January 27, 2018, Saensatharn defeated Naimjon Tuhtaboyev at THAI FIGHT Bangkok 2017 to become the 2017 THAI FIGHT 70kg Champion.

=== 2018 ===
Saensatharn continued his run of dominance in 2018, winning 6 of his 7 fights in the 2018 Thai Fight schedule by knockout. One of his highlights included a brutal one-punch knockout of Hosein Nasiri at THAI FIGHT Chiang Rai on October 27, 2018. He would later be entered into his second consecutive Thai Fight King's Cup Tournament, this time the 2018 Thai Fight 70 kg Kard Chuek King's Cup Tournament.

On November 24, 2018, Saensatharn defeated Ruslan Ataev by second-round knockout at THAI FIGHT Saraburi in the Thai Fight 70 kg Kard Chuek Tournament Semi-Final.

He was set to face Sasha Moisa in the 2018 Thai Fight 70 kg Kard Chuek Tournament Final at THAI FIGHT Nakhon Ratchasima on December 22, 2018. However, Saensatharn was forced to withdraw from the fight due to an injury, resulting in Moisa winning the tournament via forfeit.

He began his THAI FIGHT career undefeated at 15–0 (9 KOs), including going 6–0 (3 KOs) in 2017 and 8–0 (5 KOs) in 2018.

=== 2019 ===
After opening 2019 with a first-round KO victory over Kurtis Allen, Saensatharn suffered his first loss in THAI FIGHT to Sasha Moisa at THAI FIGHT Mueang Khon 2019 on March 30, 2019, losing by first-round KO.

He returned on June 29, 2019 at THAI FIGHT Betong to face David Mc Carthy, where he won via second-round technical knockout via doctor stoppage.

=== 2020 ===
Following a 15-month hiatus, Saensatharn returned to action on September 19, 2020 at THAI FIGHT New Normal, facing Andi Uustalu. He was able to win via third-round technical knockout via doctor stoppage.

On October 17, 2020, he defeated Iranian Thai Fight veteran Mohammad Hossein Doroudian at THAI FIGHT Begins by second-round knockout with a knee to the body.

On November 7, 2020, Saensatharn defeated Herbert Kinscher by first-round technical knockout at THAI FIGHT Korat 2020.

On November 28, 2020, he defeated Ruslan Ataev at THAI FIGHT Pluak Daeng by second-round knockout via right elbow.

On April 3, 2021, Saensatharn faced Nicolas Mendes at THAI FIGHT Nan. After getting dropped early by a right uppercut from Mendes, he would be knocked out in the first round with a right knee from the clinch.

== Titles and accomplishments ==
- THAI FIGHT
  - 2017 THAI FIGHT King's Cup Champion (70 kg / 154 lb)
  - 2017 Isuzu Cup Superfight Champion (70 kg / 154 lb)
  - 20–2 record
- World Muaythai Council (WMC)
  - 2016 WMC Muay Thai World Welterweight Champion (67 kg / 147 lb)
- Lumpinee Stadium
  - 2014 Lumpinee Stadium Light Welterweight Champion (63.5 kg / 140 lb)
- Professional Boxing Association of Thailand (PAT)
  - 2014 Thailand (PAT) Light Welterweight Champion (63.5 kg / 140 lb)

== Muay Thai record ==
Muay Thai record
141 Wins , 31 Losses , 5 Draws
Date	Result	Opponent	Event	Location	Method	Round	Time
2021-04-03	Loss	(Spain) Nicolas Mendes	THAI FIGHT Nan	Nan, Thailand	KO (Knee)	1	
2020-11-28	Win	(Russia) Ruslan Ataev	THAI FIGHT Pluak Daeng	Rayong, Thailand	KO (Right Elbow)	2	
2020-11-07	Win	(Germany) Herbert Kinscher	THAI FIGHT Korat 2020	Nakhon Ratchasima, Thailand	TKO (3 Knockdowns)	1	
2020-10-17	Win	(Iran) Mohammad Hossein Doroudian	THAI FIGHT Begins	Nonthaburi, Thailand	KO (Knee)	2	
2020-09-19	Win	(Estonia) Andi Uustalu	THAI FIGHT New Normal	Bangkok, Thailand	TKO (Doctor stoppage)	3	
2019-06-29	Win	(Republic of Ireland) David McCarthy	THAI FIGHT Betong	Betong, Thailand	TKO (Doctor stoppage)	2	
2019-03-30	Loss	(Ukraine) Sasha Moisa	THAI FIGHT Mueang Khon 2019	Nakhon Si Thammarat, Thailand	KO	1	
2019-02-23	Win	(United Kingdom) Kurtis Allen	THAI FIGHT Phuket 2019	Phuket, Thailand	KO	1	
2018-11-24	Win	(Russia) Ruslan Ataev	THAI Saraburi 2018	Saraburi, Thailand	KO	2	
2018-10-27	Win	(Iran) Hosein Nasiri	THAI FIGHT Chiangrai 2018	Chiang Rai, Thailand	KO	1	
2018-08-25	Win	(Germany) Fabian Hundt	THAI FIGHT Rayong 2018	Rayong, Thailand	Decision	3	3:00
2018-07-07	Win	(Germany) Pascal Schroth	THAI FIGHT Hat Yai 2018	Hat Yai, Thailand	KO	1	
2018-05-12	Win	(Iran) Mostafa Ashouri	THAI FIGHT Samui 2018	Ko Samui, Thailand	KO	1	
2018-04-21	Win	(Italy) Luca Tagliarno	THAI FIGHT Rome	Rome, Italy	TKO (Doctor stoppage)	3	
2018-03-24	Win	(Cambodia) Long Sovandoeun	THAI FIGHT Mueang Khon 2018	Nakhon Si Thammarat, Thailand	KO	1	
2018-01-27	Win	(Uzbekistan) Naimjon Tuhtaboyev	THAI FIGHT Bangkok 2017	Bangkok, Thailand	Decision	3	3:00
Wins the 2017 THAI FIGHT 70kg title.
2017-12-23	Win	(Algeria) Walid Otmane	THAI FIGHT Chiang Mai	Chiang Mai, Thailand	Decision	3	3:00
2017-11-25	Win	(Brazil) Thiago Goulate	THAI FIGHT Khmer	Phnom Penh, Cambodia	Decision	3	3:00
2017-09-30	Win	(Spain) Killian Gimenez	THAI FIGHT Barcelona	Barcelona, Spain	KO	3	
2017-07-15	Win	(Cambodia) Long Sophy	THAI FIGHT: We Love Yala	Yala, Thailand	TKO (Referee stoppage)	1	
2017-05-27	Win	(France) Johny Tancray	THAI FIGHT Italy	Turin, Italy	KO	1	
2017-04-29	Win	(Thailand) Aroondej Petchsupapan	THAI FIGHT Samui 2017	Ko Samui, Thailand	Decision	3	3:00
2017-01-14	Win	(France) Raphael Rayepin	Topking World Series - TK12	Hohhot, China	KO	1	
2016-12-17	Win	(Thailand) Capitan Petchyindee Academy	Omnoi Stadium	Bangkok, Thailand	Decision	5	3:00
2016-08-30	Loss	(Thailand) Manasak Sor.Jor.Lekmuangnon	Lumpinee Stadium	Bangkok, Thailand	Decision	5	3:00
2016-07-03	Win	(Thailand) Lek EiwaSportsGym	BOM12 - The Battle Of Muay Thai 12 -	Yokohama, Japan	Decision (Unanimous)	5	3:00
Defends WMC World Welterweight (67kg) title.
2016-05-19	Win	(France) Dylan Salvador	Capital Fights	Paris, France	Decision	5	3:00
Wins WMC World Welterweight (67kg) title.
2016-05-10	Win	(Thailand) Nontakit Sor.Jor.Lekmuangnont	Lumpinee Stadium	Bangkok, Thailand	Decision	5	3:00
2016-04-06	Loss	(Thailand) Littewada Sitthikul		Chiang Mai, Thailand	KO	4	
2016-02-12	Loss	(Thailand) Manasak Sor.Jor.Lekmuangnon	Petchkiatpetch, Lumpinee Stadium	Bangkok, Thailand	KO (Elbow)	3	
2015-10-05	Loss	(Thailand) Yodwicha Por Boonsit	Rajadamnern Stadium	Bangkok, Thailand	Decision	5	3:00
2015-06-30	Win	(Thailand) Yodwicha Por Boonsit	Lumpinee Stadium	Bangkok, Thailand	Decision	5	3:00
2015-04-29	Win	(Thailand) Manasak Sor.Jor.Lekmuangnon	Rajadamnern Stadium	Bangkok, Thailand	Decision	5	3:00
2014-12-24	Loss	(Thailand) Yodwicha Por Boonsit	Rajadamnern Stadium	Bangkok, Thailand	Decision	5	3:00
2014-11-15	Draw	(France) Dylan Salvador	Topking World Series	Montigny-le-Bretonneux, France	Decision	3	3:00
2014-09-05	Loss	(Thailand) Singdam Kiatmuu9	Lumpinee Stadium	Bangkok, Thailand	Decision	5	3:00
For the Lumpinee Stadium Light Welterweight (63.5kg) title.
2014-07-08	Win	(Thailand) Petchboonchu FA Group	Lumpinee Stadium	Bangkok, Thailand	Decision	5	3:00
2014-06-	Win	(Thailand) Chamuaktong Fightermuaythai	Lumpinee Stadium	Bangkok, Thailand	Decision	5	3:00
Wins the Lumpinee Stadium and Thailand 140lbs Title.
2014-03-15	Win	(Thailand) Yutachai Kiatpatarapan	Ladprao Stadium	Bangkok, Thailand	KO (Knees)		
2013-12-21	Win	(Thailand) Manasak Sor.Jor.Lekmuangnon	Omnoi Stadium, Weber Tournament	Samut Sakhon, Thailand	KO (Low kick)	3	
2013-11-26	Win	(Thailand) Aranchai Pran26	Lumpinee Stadium	Bangkok, Thailand	Decision	5	3:00
2013-11-02	Win	(Thailand) Phetmongkon Sor.Khamsing	Omnoi Stadium, Weber Tournament	Samut Sakhon, Thailand	Decision	5	3:00
2013-	Loss	(Thailand) Saksongkram Popteeratham	Omnoi Stadium, Weber Tournament	Samut Sakhon, Thailand	Decision	5	3:00
2013-	Loss	(Thailand) Chamophet Phetkasem	Omnoi Stadium, Weber Tournament	Samut Sakhon, Thailand	Decision	5	3:00
2013-	Win	(Thailand) Daoprakay Nor.Siriphung	Omnoi Stadium, Weber Tournament	Samut Sakhon, Thailand	Decision	5	3:00
2013-06-01	Win	(Thailand) Manasak Sor.Jor.Lekmuangnon	Omnoi Stadium	Samut Sakhon, Thailand	Decision	5	3:00
2013-03-26	Loss	(Thailand) Tuantong Phumpanmuang	Lumpinee Stadium	Bangkok, Thailand	TKO (Doctor Stoppage)	3	
For the Thailand 140lbs Title.
2013-02-26	Win	(Thailand) Petchsanguan Sor.Yupinda	Lumpinee Stadium	Bangkok, Thailand	Decision	5	3:00
2013-01-25	Win	(Thailand) Seansak Phetbancha	Lumpinee Stadium	Bangkok, Thailand	Decision	5	3:00
2012-11-16	Win	(Thailand) Manasak Sor.Jor.Lekmuangnon	Lumpinee Stadium	Bangkok, Thailand	KO (Left Knee)	3	
2012-08-17	Loss	(Thailand) Wacharachai Rachanon	Lumpinee Stadium	Bangkok, Thailand	Decision	5	3:00
2012-07-10	Win	(Thailand) Tanachai Chor. Pradit	Lumpinee Stadium	Bangkok, Thailand	Decision	5	3:00
2012-06-13	Win	(Thailand) Playnoy Porpaoin	Rajadamnern Stadium	Bangkok, Thailand	Decision	5	3:00
2011-10-14	Win	(Thailand) Yodphet Wor. Sangprapai	Lumpinee Stadium	Bangkok, Thailand	Decision	5	3:00
2011-06-17	Win	(Thailand) Tewalith Sitsongpeenong	Lumpinee Stadium	Bangkok, Thailand	TKO (Knees)	4	
2011-01-14	Loss	(Thailand) Kwanaik Kiatkamphon	Lumpinee Stadium	Bangkok, Thailand	Decision	5	3:00
2010-12-09	Loss	(Thailand) Thepnimit Sitmonchai	Rajadamnern Stadium	Bangkok, Thailand	KO (Left Hook)	2	
2010-02-07	Loss	(Thailand) Petnabee Sevenfarm	Aswindam stadium	Thailand	Decision	5	3:00
2009-06-12	Loss	(Thailand) Yardfa Wor. Kaewkraison	Lumpinee Stadium	Bangkok, Thailand	TKO	3	
Legend: Win Loss Draw/No contest Notes
