= Max Muay Thai =

Thai boxing event and stadium

Max Muay Thai Stadium
- Interactive map of Max Muay Thai Stadium
- Address: Sukhumvit-Pattaya Soi 42; Pattaya; Thailand
- Coordinates: 12°55′43.676″N 100°53′57.851″E
- Owner: Nawat Thaochareeonsuk; Piyachart Srichan
- Type: Muay Thai stadium and promoter
- Event: Muaythai
- Production: Amarin TV; Channel 9 MCOT HD

Max Muay Thai (Thai: แม็กซ์ มวยไทย) is a stadium and organizer of Muay Thai based in Pattaya, Thailand broadcast from its own stadium on Channel 8 every Sunday. The promotion has been credited for elevating the level of entertainment of Muaythai and to have modernized the way it was presented in the Thailand. The stadium was an important venue outside of the elite Muay Thai scene in Bangkok. After a fire destroyed the stadium, operations ceased in December 2020.

== History ==
In November 2014, the Max Muaythai Stadium was opened under the management of Mr. Nawat Thaochareeonsuk and Mr. Piyachart Srichan. Unlike the weekly Muay Thai programs from Rajadamnern Stadium and Lumpinee Stadium, Max Muay Thai reduced the length of its matches to three-round bouts and added ring girls more commonly seen in western promotions. In 2018, after the separation of the Channel 8 TV coverage team from Max Muay Thai, a new competitor named Super Champ Muay Thai was launched in Bangkok. Channel 8 is the official broadcaster of the promotion, televised every Sunday. After a fire destroyed the stadium, the promotion ceased operations in December 2020, but was expecting to re-start activities in 2022.

On February 18, 2016, a fire broke out at the Max Muay Thai Stadium in Pattaya and completely destroyed the venue causing damage estimated at 200 million Thai baht. It is believed that technicians were servicing the air-conditioning units in the back when the compressor exploded which started the fire. The incident left the manager of the venue and three other staff members with minor injuries and possible carbon monoxide poisoning. The stadium had no fire insurance.

On July 24, 2026, Tyson Fury was scheduled to return to the ring against Polish heavyweight Mariusz Wach at Max Muay Thai Stadium in Pattaya, Thailand, in a bout widely reported as a tune-up fight ahead of a proposed heavyweight showdown with Anthony Joshua later in 2026. Fury won by corner retirement after the seventh round, in a dominant performance.

== Notable competitors ==
- (United Kingdom) Liam Harrison
- (Thailand) Buakaw Banchamek
- (Morocco) Youssef Boughanem
- (Thailand) Nilmungkorn Sudsakorngym
- (Thailand) Sagetdao Petpayathai
- (Belarus) Andrei Kulebin
- (Thailand) Rodtang Jitmuangnon
- (Thailand) Sitthichai Sitsongpeenong
- (Thailand) Jomthong Chuwattana
- (Italy) Mathias Gallo Cassarino
- (Italy) Joseph Lasiri
- (Japan) Yoshihiro Sato
- (Japan) Nadaka Yoshinari
- (United States) Sylvie von Duuglas-Ittu
- (Thailand) Petchsamarn Sor.Samarngarment
- (China) Wei Rui
- (United States) Cyrus Washington
- (England) Tyson Fury
- (Thailand) Saeksan Or. Kwanmuang
- (Thailand) Capitan Petchyindee Academy
- (Italy) Fabio Pinca
- (Brazil) Julio Lobo
- (Poland) Mariusz Wach
- (Thailand) Detrit Sathian Gym

== See also ==
- Super Champ Muay Thai
- Kunlun Fight
- Pattaya Boxing World
- Lumpinee Stadium
- Rajadamnern Stadium
- Thai Fight
