= Youssef Boughanem =

Moroccan-Belgian professional Muay Thai fighter

- Born: December 6, 1989 (age 36); Brussels, Belgium
- Nickname: Terminator
- Nationality: Moroccan; Belgian
- Height: 185 cm (6 ft 1 in)
- Division: Welterweight; Super Welterweight; Middleweight
- Style: Muay Thai
- Stance: Orthodox
- Fighting out of: Pattaya, Thailand
- Team: Boughanem Academy; Petchsaman Gym
- Years active: 2008 – present

Kickboxing record
- Total: 240
- Wins: 188
- By knockout: 120
- Losses: 44
- Draws: 8

Mixed martial arts record
- Total: 6
- Wins: 6
- By knockout: 4
- By submission: 1
- By decision: 1
- Losses: 0

Other information
- Notable relatives: Yassine Boughanem (brother)

Youssef Boughanem (born December 6, 1989) is a Moroccan-Belgian professional Muay Thai fighter, kickboxer, and mixed martial artist. He is a former Lumpinee Stadium, Rajadamnern Stadium, Omnoi Stadium, WMC, WBC, ISKA, WKN, WAKO, Thai Fight, MAX Muay Thai, and IBF champion. Boughanem currently trains out of Petchsaman Gym in Thailand.

Youssef Boughanem was previously ranked number one in the world.

== Muay Thai career ==
Youssef began practicing Muay Thai at the age of 12 and moved to Thailand with his brother Yassine Boughanem at 17 to focus on training fulltime after the loss of both his parents. His first stop was at the famed Jocky Gym in Bangkok. Yassine is a Muay Thai fighter in the heavyweight and super heavyweight divisions and has won WBC, WPMF, and WKN world titles.

=== 2010 ===
He gained prominence when he competed in the first-ever Thai Fight event in 2010. On August 29, 2010, he defeated Australia's Jason Lea in the round-of-sixteen. He then defeated Ireland's Anthony Kane via extra-round decision in the quarter-finals on October 25, 2010. On December 6, 2010, Boughanem defeated Soichiro Miyakoshi to advance to the final round of the Thai Fight tournament. That same night, he lost to Fabio Pinca in the final, where he finished as the runner-up in the 2010 Thai Fight 67 kg Tournament.

=== 2012 ===
On 3 March 2012, Boughanem faced Rajadamnern Stadium champion Diesellek TopkingBoxing and got knocked out with a left kick at Lumpini Stadium.

=== 2013 ===
==== THAI FIGHT Kard Chuek ====
After his first Thai Fight outing, Boughanem fought for different programs around Thailand and France. He eventually returned in 2013 when Thai Fight unveiled their new format: THAI FIGHT Kard Chuek. This format saw fighters wearing rope bindings instead of gloves (Muay Kard Chuek) and would eventually become the defining characteristic for subsequent Thai Fight events. Youssef Boughanem would enter the inaugural THAI FIGHT Kard Chuek tournament. On June 1, 2013, he defeated Salahdine Ait Naceur by second-round knockout in the 1/16 finals. He then beat Sebastien Billard in the 1/8 finals by first-round knockout on June 15, 2013.

On July 14, 2013, Boughanem faced Burmese fighter Zaw Tum in the quarterfinals and won by decision. Zaw Tum is better known as Tun Tun Min and went on to become openweight Lethwei World Champion.

On July 29, 2013, Boughanem was eliminated from the tournament when he lost in the semifinal round by decision to Saiyok Pumpanmuang, who eventually finished as the THAI FIGHT Kard Chuek tournament runner-up.

=== 2015 ===
==== 2015 THAI FIGHT Champion ====
After an absence from the promotion in 2014, Youssef Boughanem made his return to Thai Fight in late 2015, appearing at THAI FIGHT Vietnam on October 24, 2015. There, he faced Russian fighter Yurik Davtyan and won by decision. Later on, he entered the 2015 THAI FIGHT 72.5 kg tournament. In the tournament semifinals, Boughanem defeated Rungrawee P.K.SaenchaiMuaythaiGym at THAI FIGHT RPCA on November 21, 2015. On December 31, 2015, he defeated Sudsakorn Sor Klinmee at THAI FIGHT Count Down to win the 2015 THAI FIGHT 72.5 kg tournament and capture his first Thai Fight title.

==== Omnoi Stadium Middleweight Champion ====
On August 15, 2015, Youssef Boughanem defeated Rungrawee P.K.SaenchaiMuaythaiGym by third-round knockout to capture the Omnoi Stadium middleweight title. He successfully defended the Omnoi Stadium title against Chanajon P.K. Saenchai Muaythaigym by five-round decision on September 26 of the same year.

=== 2016 ===
On June 24, 2016, Youssef Boughanem defeated Armen Petrosyan via three-decision in Monte Carlo to win the WAKO Pro 71.8 kg Championship.

==== Rajadamnern Stadium Middleweight Champion ====
On August 31, 2016, he defeated Kompetch Lookprabat by fourth-round knockout to capture the Rajadamnern Stadium middleweight championship.

=== 2018 ===
==== Middleweight Champion ====
On February 26, 2018, Boughanem retained the Rajadamnern title against Noppakaw Siriluck Muaythai by third-round knockout at Phoenix 5 Bangkok, which also saw him winning the WBC Muay Thai Middleweight World Championship.

On April 28, 2018, he defeated Payakdam Extra Cole Film by third-round TKO to win the IBF Muaythai middleweight title.

==== Lumpinee Stadium Middleweight Champion ====
On May 22, 2018, Youssef Boughanem defeated Talaytong Sor. Thanaphet by fourth-round TKO to win the Lumpinee Stadium middleweight championship.

He retained the WBC Muay Thai title against Kongjak Por. Pao In on October 13, 2018, where he also won the ISKA Muay Thai light middleweight title.

He defended the WBC Muay Thai title a third time against Joe Craven on April 22, 2019, winning by fourth-round TKO. Boughanem successfully retained the WBC Muay Thai belt in his fourth title defense against Tobias Alexandersson on November 16, 2019, winning a five-round decision.

Boughanem was originally scheduled to defend his WBC Muay Thai belt against Liam Nolan on July 17 at PSM Fight Night. However, travel restrictions between the UK and Belgium prevented Nolan from making the fight. Nolan would be replaced by Niclas Larsen. On July 17, 2021, Youssef Boughanem defeated Niclas Larsen to retain the WBC Muay Thai middleweight title, as well as capture the WBC Muay Thai Diamond middleweight championship.

Boughanem was scheduled to defend his WBC Muaythai Middleweight title against Liam Nolan at A Night to Remember on November 7, 2021. He lost the fight and the title by split decision, ending his three-year reign as WBC world champion.

Boughanem was booked to face David Pennimpede on March 26, 2022.

==== WKN World Super Welterweight Muay Thai champion ====
On April 22, 2019, in Brussels, Belgium Boughanem defeated Joe Craven by TKO in the fourth round and became the WKN World super welterweight champion in Muay Thai.

On June 25, 2022, in Liege, Belgium Boughanem made the first successful defense of his WKN World super welterweight title by knockout in the third round against Toni Romero at La Nuit Des Gladiateurs 2022.

=== WMC ===
In 2023 Boughanem defeated Sudsakorn Sor Klinmee to win the WMC Golden King World -164lb title.

=== Glory ===
Youssef Boughanem made his debut for the European kickboxing promotion Glory against Stanislav Kazantsev at Glory 91 on April 27, 2024. He won the fight by a second-round technical knockout.

Boughanem made his second Glory debut in August, faced Angelo Volpe in Glory 98 losing a split decision.

== Mixed martial arts career ==
Youssef Boughanem made his mixed martial arts debut against Dmytro Glevka at FAF in Octogon on January 27, 2024. He won by second-round technical knockout.

=== BRAVE Combat Federation ===
In 2024, Youssef Boughanem signed with Bahrain-based BRAVE Combat Federation to focus on his mixed martial arts career. Boughanem will make his BRAVE CF debut at BRAVE CF 83 in the Netherlands. He defeated Saad Touijar by second-round technical knockout.

== Titles and accomplishments ==
- World Muaythai Council
  - 2022 WMC Golden King World 164 lb Champion
- WBC Muay Thai
  - 2021 WBC Muay Thai Diamond Middleweight Champion
  - 2019 WBC Muay Thai Middleweight Champion (one time, four defenses)
- World Kickboxing Network
  - 2019 WKN Muay Thai World Super Welterweight Champion
    - Two successful title defenses
- International Sport Karate Association
  - 2018 ISKA Muay Thai Light Middleweight Champion
- Lumpinee Stadium
  - 2018 Lumpinee Stadium Middleweight (160 lbs) Champion

- Phoenix Fighting Championship
  - 2017 Phoenix FC Middleweight Champion
- Rajadamnern Stadium
  - 2016 Rajadamnern Stadium Middleweight (160 lbs) Champion
- World Association of Kickboxing Organizations
  - 2016 WAKO Pro Kickboxing 71.8 kg/158 lbs Champion
- Thai Fight
  - 2015 Thai Fight 72.5 kg Tournament Champion
  - 2010 Thai Fight 67 kg Tournament runner-up
- Omnoi Stadium
  - 2015 Omnoi Stadium Middleweight 160 lb Champion
- Venum Victory World Series
  - 2015 Venum Middleweight Champion
- MAX Muay Thai
  - 2014 MAX Muay Thai Tournament Champion
- World Muaythai Association
  - 2010 WMA 71 kg Tournament Champion
- 1-KING
  - 2010 1-KING Tournament Champion
- The Champions Club
  - 2010 TCC Super Welterweight Tournament Champion
- Thepprasit Stadium
  - 2009 Thepprasit Stadium Champion
- Belgian Muaythai Organisation
  - 2007 Belgium Muay Thai Champion

== Mixed martial arts record ==
Professional record breakdown
6 matches	6 wins	0 losses
By knockout	4	0
By submission	1	0
By decision	1	0

Res.	Record	Opponent	Method	Event	Date	Round	Time	Location	Notes
Win	6–0	Mohamed Soumah	Submission (rear naked choke)	Ares FC 44	October 31, 2026	1	3:43	Eckbolsheim, France	Catchweight (160 lb) bout.
Win	5–0	Anthony Zeidan	KO (knee to the body)	Brave CF 101	Nov 9, 2025	1	4:16	Isa Town, Bahrain	Catchweight (161 lb) bout.
Win	4–0	Dimitris Moirotsos	TKO (corner stoppage)	Brave CF 94	May 17, 2025	2	5:00	Geneva, Switzerland	Catchweight (159 lb) bout; Boughanem missed weight (161.3 lb).
Win	3–0	Johan Van de Hel	Decision (unanimous)	Brave CF 90	November 23, 2024	3	5:00	Vienna, Austria	Catchweight (159 lb) bout.
Win	2–0	Saad Touijar	TKO (punches)	Brave CF 83	May 25, 2024	2	2:10	Alkmaar, Netherlands	Catchweight (159 lb) bout.
Win	1–0	Dmytro Glevka	TKO (knee and punches)	Fight And Furious in Octogon 1	January 27, 2024	2	1:47	Longeville-lès-Metz, France	Catchweight (159 lb) bout.

== Muay Thai and kickboxing record ==
Muay Thai and kickboxing record
188 wins, 44 losses, 8 draws, 1 no contest
Date	Result	Opponent	Event	Location	Method	Round	Time
2024-08-31	Loss	(Italy) Angelo Volpe	Glory 94	Antwerp, Belgium	Decision (split)	3	3:00
2024-04-27	Win	(Ukraine) Stanislav Kazantsev	Glory 91	Paris, France	TKO (shoulder injury)	2	2:58
2023-07-07	Win	(United Kingdom) Mo Abdurahman	Warrior Spirit	Saint-Josse-ten-Noode, Belgium	TKO	3	
Defends WKN Muay Thai World Super Welterweight title.
2023-02-02	Win	(Italy) Federico Puddu	PSM Fight Night	Goussainville, France	KO (knee to body)	3	
2023-01-02	Win	(Thailand) Sudsakorn Sor Klinmee	Golden King Promotions	Koh Samui, Thailand	KO (knee to body)	4	
Wins WMC Golden King World -164lb title.
2022-11-12	Win	(Sweden) Tobias Alexandersson	Alpha Fight League 2	Brussels, Belgium	TKO (doctor stoppage)	2	
Defends WKN Muay Thai World Super Welterweight title.
2022-06-25	Win	(Spain) Toni Romero	La Nuit Des Gladiateurs 2022	Liege, Belgium	TKO	3	
Defends WKN Muay Thai World Super Welterweight title.
2022-05-28	Win	(Thailand) Avatar Tor.Morsri	Fairtex Fight, Lumpinee Stadium	Bangkok, Thailand	Decision	3	3:00
2022-03-26	Win	(Australia) David Pennimpede	Infliction Fight Series	Australia	Decision (split)	3	3:00
2022-01-29	Win	(Thailand) Sangchan SorSor.Nawat	RAGE FIGHT NIGHT	Pattaya, Thailand	Decision	3	3:00
2021-11-07	Loss	(United Kingdom) Liam Nolan	Real Fighters	Hilversum, Netherlands	Decision (split)	5	3:00
Loses the WBC Muay Thai World Middleweight title.
2021-07-17	Win	(Denmark) Niclas Larsen	PSM Fight Night	Brussels, Belgium	Decision (unanimous)	5	3:00
Retains the WBC Muay Thai middleweight title and wins the WBC Muay Thai Diamond middleweight title.
2020-01-29	Win	(Spain) Ignasi Larios	Prestige Fight	Paris, France	KO	3	
2019-11-16	Win	(Sweden) Tobias Alexandersson	PSM Fight Night	Brussels, Belgium	Decision	5	3:00
Retains the WBC Muay Thai middleweight title.
2019-02-23	Loss	(Cape Verde) Wilson Varela	Arena Fight	Aix-en-Provence, France	Decision	5	3:00
For the Arena Fight K-1 -71kg title.
2018-11-24	Win	(United Kingdom) Joe Craven	PSM Fight Night	Brussels, Belgium	TKO	4	
Retains the WBC Muay Thai middleweight title and wins the WKN super welterweight title.
2018-11-24	Win	(United Kingdom) Jake Purdy	Yas Island Muay Thai Championship 2018	Abu Dhabi, United Arab Emirates	KO	2	
2018-10-13	Win	(Thailand) Kongjak Por Pao In	Phoenix 10	Brussels, Belgium	Decision	5	3:00
Retains the WBC Muay Thai middleweight title and wins the ISKA light middleweight title.
2018-05-22	Win	(Thailand) Talaytong Sor.Thanaphet	Lumpinee Stadium	Bangkok, Thailand	TKO	4	
Wins the Lumpinee Stadium Middleweight (160 lbs) title.
2018-04-28	Win	(Thailand) Payakdam Extra Cole Film	Phoenix 7 Phuket	Phuket, Thailand	TKO	3	
Retains the Phoenix FC middleweight and IBF Muaythai middleweight titles.
2018-02-26	Win	(Thailand) Noppakaw Siriluck Muay Thai	Phoenix 5 Bangkok	Bangkok, Thailand	KO	3	
Retains the Phoenix FC middleweight title and wins the WBC Muay Thai middleweight and IBF Muaythai middleweight title.
2017-09-22	Win	(United Kingdom) Artur Saladiak	Phoenix 3 London	London, United Kingdom	TKO	3	
Wins the Phoenix FC middleweight title.
2017-08-07	Win	(Thailand) Yodpayak Sitsongpeenong	Rajadamnern Stadium	Bangkok, Thailand	KO	5	3:00
2017-07-15	Win	(Iran) Saber Athari	THAI FIGHT We Love Yala	Yala, Thailand	KO	1	
2017-06-29	Win	(Thailand) Wanchalerm Uddonmuang	Best of Siam XI	Paris, France	TKO (retirement)	4	
2017-05-27	Win	(Italy) Anouar Khamlali	THAI FIGHT Turin	Turin, Italy	Decision	3	3:00
2017-07-15	Win	(Morocco) Ilyass Chakir	THAI FIGHT Samui 2017	Ko Samui, Thailand	Decision	3	3:00
2017-04-08	Win	(France) Gaëtan Dambo	THAI FIGHT Paris	Paris, France	Decision	3	3:00
2017-10-15	Win	(Russia) Ahmed Aushev	THAI FIGHT Chengdu	Leshan, China	KO	1	
2016-12-24	Win	(Thailand) Saiyok Pumpanmuang	THAI FIGHT The Fighter King	Bangkok, Thailand	Decision	3	3:00
2016-08-31	Win	(Thailand) Kompetchlek Lookprabat	Rajadamnern Stadium	Bangkok, Thailand	KO	4	
Wins the Rajadamnern Stadium middleweight title.
2016-06-24	Win	(Italy) Armen Petrosyan	Monte-Carlo Fighting Masters	Monte Carlo, Monaco	Decision	3	3:00
Wins the WAKO Pro 71.8kg title.
2016-05-27	NC	(Thailand) Kompetchlek Lookprabat	Best of Siam	Bangkok, Thailand	No contest	1	
For the Rajadamnern Stadium middleweight title.
2016-03-19	Win	(Thailand) Denphanom Rongreankeela Korat	THAI FIGHT Korat	Nakhon Ratchasima, Thailand	Decision	3	3:00
2015-03-12	Win	(Brazil) Matheus Pereira	THAI FIGHT	Bangkok, Thailand	KO	3	
2015-12-31	Win	(Thailand) Sudsakorn Sor Klinmee	THAI FIGHT Count Down	Bangkok, Thailand	Decision	3	3:00
Wins the 2015 THAI FIGHT 72.5kg tournament.
2015-11-21	Win	(Thailand) Rungrawee P.K.SaenchaiMuaythaiGym	THAI FIGHT RPCA	Nakhon Pathom, Thailand	Decision	3	3:00
2015-10-24	Win	(Russia) Yurik Davtyan	THAI FIGHT Vietnam	Ho Chi Minh City, Vietnam	Decision	3	3:00
2015-09-26	Win	(Thailand) Chanajon P.K. Saenchai Muaythaigym	Omnoi Stadium	Bangkok, Thailand	Decision	5	3:00
Retains the Omnoi Stadium middleweight title.
2015-08-15	Win	(Thailand) Rungrawee P.K.SaenchaiMuaythaiGym	Omnoi Stadium	Bangkok, Thailand	KO	3	
Wins the Omnoi Stadium middleweight title.
2015-03-07	Win	(Thailand) Chenrob Pumpanmuang	Master of the Ring	Pattaya, Thailand	Decision	5	3:00
Wins the Venum middleweight title.
2015-02-01	Loss	(Thailand) Kanongsuk Chuwattana	MAX Muay Thai, Tournament Semi-Finals	Bangkok, Thailand	Disqualification	2	
2014-11-09	Win	(Sweden) Tobias Alexandersson	MAX Muay Thai, Tournament Qualification Finals	Pattaya, Thailand	Decision	3	3:00
2014-11-09	Win	(Thailand) Fahmongkol Sor. Jor. Danrayong	MAX Muay Thai, Tournament Qualification Semi-Finals	Pattaya, Thailand	Decision	4	3:00
2014-10-05	Win	(Thailand) Kanongsuk Chuwattana	MAX Muay Thai	Pattaya, Thailand	KO	2	
2014-09-28	Win	(China) Sun Weiqiang	Wu Lin Feng	Hong Kong	Decision	3	3:00
2014-06-14	Loss	(Thailand) Thongchai Sitsongpeenong	Best of Siam 5	Paris, France	TKO (injury)	3	
2014-04-12	Win	(Thailand) Chenrob Pumpanmuang	Thepprasit Stadium	Pattaya, Thailand	TKO	4	
2014-03-29	Loss	(Thailand) Aikpracha Meenayothin	MAX Muay Thai	Bangkok, Thailand	Decision	3	3:00
2014-02-17	Win	(Thailand) Chenrob Pumpanmuang	Thepprasit Stadium	Pattaya, Thailand	KO		
2013-07-29	Loss	(Thailand) Saiyok Pumpanmuang	THAI FIGHT Kard Chuek, Semi-finals	Bangkok, Thailand	Decision	3	3:00
2013-07-14	Win	(Myanmar) Tun Tun Min	THAI FIGHT Kard Chuek, Quarter-finals	Bangkok, Thailand	Decision	3	3:00
2013-06-29	Win	(Thailand) Peemai Jitmuangnon	THAI FIGHT	Bangkok, Thailand	Decision	3	3:00
2013-06-15	Win	(France) Sebastien Billard	THAI FIGHT Kard Chuek, 1/8 finals	Bangkok, Thailand	KO	1	
2013-06-01	Win	(France) Salahdine Ait Naceur	THAI FIGHT Kard Chuek, 1/16 finals	Bangkok, Thailand	KO	2	
2012-06-14	Loss	(Thailand) Aikpracha Meenayothin	Best of Siam	Paris, France	TKO (injury)	2	
2012-03-24	Loss	(Thailand) Diesellek TopkingBoxing	Muaydee Vitheethai	Samut Prakan, Thailand	KO	2	
2012-02-27	Loss	(Thailand) Suriya Prasathinphimai	Europe vs. Thailand	Pattaya, France	Decision	5	3:00
2012-01-07	Draw	(Thailand) Dernchonlek Sor. Sor. Niyom	Omnoi Stadium	Bangkok, Thailand	Decision	5	3:00
2011-12-10	Loss	(Thailand) Thepsutin Pumpanmuang	Thepprasit Stadium	Pattaya, Thailand	Decision	5	3:00
2011-02-12	Loss	(Thailand) Buakaw Banchamek	La Nuit des Titans: Buakaw vs. Boughanem	Tours, France	TKO (injury)	1	
2010-12-06	Loss	(France) Fabio Pinca	THAI FIGHT Final, Finals	Nakhon Ratchasima, Thailand	Decision	3	3:00
For the THAI FIGHT welterweight 67kg tournament.
2010-12-06	Win	(Japan) Soichiro Miyakoshi	THAI FIGHT Final, Semi-finals	Nakhon Ratchasima, Thailand	Decision	3	3:00
2010-10-25	Win	(Republic of Ireland) Anthony Kane	THAI FIGHT, Quarter-finals	Bangkok, Thailand	Decision	4	3:00
2010-08-29	Win	(Australia) Jason Lea	THAI FIGHT, 1/8 finals	Bangkok, Thailand	Decision	3	3:00
2010-07-12	Win	(Thailand) Big Ben Chor Praram 6	Thepprasit Stadium	Pattaya, Thailand	Decision	5	3:00
2010-05-22	Win	(Iran) Behzad Rafigh Doust	WMA Tournament, Finals	Zhengzhou, China	Decision	3	3:00
Wins the WMA 71kg title.
2010-05-22	Win	(Slovakia) Egon Racz	WMA Tournament, Semi-finals	Zhengzhou, China	Decision	3	3:00
2010-05-22	Win	(Canada) Alain Sylvestre	WMA Tournament, Quarter-finals	Zhengzhou, China	KO	1	
2010-01-31	Win	(Thailand) Thepsutin Pumpanmuang	Channel 7 Boxing Stadium	Bangkok, Thailand	TKO (injury)	5	
2010-01-07	Win	(United Kingdom) Stephen Meikle	The Champions Club Thailand, Finals	Pattaya, Thailand	KO	1	
Wins the TCC super welterweight title.
2010-01-07	Win	(United Kingdom) Jason Woodham	The Champions Club Thailand, Semi-finals	Pattaya, Thailand	TKO	1	
2009-12-22	Win	(Thailand) Pornpitak Petchudomchai	Chaweng Boxing Stadium	Ko Samui, Thailand	TKO	2	
2009-12-22	Win	(Thailand) Pornpitak Petchudomchai	Chaweng Boxing Stadium	Ko Samui, Thailand	TKO	2	
2009-12-08	Win	(Thailand) Tawalitnoi SKV Gym	Surat Thani Fight Night	Surat Thani, Thailand	Decision	5	3:00
2009-12-04	Win	(Thailand) Petmai Petjaopraya	King's Birthday	Bangkok, Thailand	TKO	4	
2009-11-27	Loss	(Thailand) Prakaisaeng Sit-Or	Toyota Vigo Cup, Finals	Bangkok, Thailand	Decision	5	3:00
2009-11-27	Win	(Thailand) Longern Pitakkruchaidaen	Toyota Vigo Cup, Semi-finals	Bangkok, Thailand	Decision	5	3:00
2009-11-27	Win	(France) Sofian Seboussi	Toyota Vigo Cup, Quarter-finals	Bangkok, Thailand	Decision	5	3:00
2009-10-28	Win	(Thailand) Chokchai Sor Kingstar	Rajadamnern Stadium	Bangkok, Thailand	Decision	5	3:00
2009-10-28	Win	(South Korea) Steve Sasiprapa	Queen's Birthday	Bangkok, Thailand	KO	3	
2009-07-23	Win	(Thailand) Mangkornyok Sityodtong	Thepprasit Stadium	Pattaya, Thailand	TKO		
2009-07-15	Win	(Thailand) Numbeechai Nakatornparkview	Surat Thani Fight Night	Surat Thani, Thailand	Decision	5	3:00
2009-07-04	Win	(Thailand) Yodnapa Changtalay	Bangla Boxing Stadium	Phuket, Thailand	KO	3	
2009-06-30	Win	(Thailand) Mankong Sitpaneng		Phuket, Thailand	Decision	5	3:00
2009-06-24	Win	(Thailand) Pet-tho Baan Muaythai	Surat Thani Fight Night	Surat Thani, Thailand	KO	4	
2008-08-01	Win	(Netherlands) Robin van Roosmalen		Veghel, Netherlands			
Legend: Win Loss Draw/no contest Notes
