= PTT Petchrungruang =

Muay Thai fighter

- Born: Wanchalerm Peangdanklang; September 24, 1997 (age 29); Nakhon Sawan Province, Thailand
- Other names: Por Tor Thor Petchrungruang (ป.ต.ท. เพชรรุ่งเรือง); P.T.T V.Rujirawong; PTT ApichartFarm; PTT Sor.Pattanagas; Khun Khao Chalamrai (Evil Shark Knees)
- Height: 178 cm (5 ft 10 in)
- Weight: 69 kg (152 lb; 10.9 st)
- Stance: Orthodox
- Fighting out of: Pattaya, Thailand
- Team: Petchrungruang; Venum Training Camp

Kickboxing record
- Total: 142
- Wins: 115
- By knockout: 50
- Losses: 26
- Draws: 1

PTT Petchrungruang (ปตท. เพชรรุ่งเรือง), is a Thai Muay Thai fighter.

== Biography and career ==
=== Early career ===
PTT started training in Muay Thai at the age of nine at the Petchrungruang camp in the Chonburi Province. He followed boxers during their training, which led him to a gym where the owners were willing to train PTT and other kids for free. He had his first fight a few months later. It took two years before he received his first purses, which he used to support his family. He made his debut in Bangkok at the age of 13 and soon had to take on adults due to his large build.

=== Omnoi and Isuzu Cup Champion ===
On November 24, 2012 PTT won his first major title when he defeated Nataphon Kiatawan for the Omnoi Stadium 130 lbs title.

In 2015, PTT engaged in the annual Isuzu Cup, where he went undefeated, winning the title on February 17, 2016, against Diesellek Aoodonmuang. This win allowed him to compete at THAI FIGHT Korat on March 19, 2016, against Payaksamui Lukjaoporongtom. He won by decision and was rewarded with a multi-fight contract for the THAI FIGHT promotion.

=== THAI FIGHT ===
On December 24, 2016, PTT defeated Sean Kearney from Canada to win the THAI FIGHT King's Cup 67 kg title.

On January 27, 2018, PTT won the THAI FIGHT Kard Chuek King's Cup at 70 kg by defeating Dany Njiba by knockout in the first round.

On October 27, 2017, PPT saw his 19 fights win streak in THAI FIGHT end when Brazilian fighter Diego Beneduzzi knocked him out in the first round at THAI FIGHT Chiangrai 2018.

=== ONE Championship ===
PTT was scheduled to make his ONE Championship debut at ONE Friday Fights 114 in the Lumpinee Stadium against Elies Abdelali on June 27, 2025.

== Titles and accomplishments ==
- Omnoi Stadium
  - 2012 Omnoi Stadium 130 lbs Champion
  - 2016 Isuzu Cup Winner
- THAI FIGHT
  - 2016 Isuzu Cup -67 kg Superfight Winner
  - 2016 Thai Fight -67 kg King's Cup Champion
  - 2018 Thai Fight -70 kg Kard Chuek King's Cup Champion
  - 2019 Thai Fight -69 kg Superfight Champion
  - 2023 Thai Fight -70 kg Kard Chuek King's Cup Champion

== Fight record ==
Muay Thai record
114 Wins (51 (T)KOs), 26 Losses, 1 Draws
Date	Result	Opponent	Event	Location	Method	Round	Time
2026-11-13	Win	(Morocco) Hamza Rachid	ONE The Inner Circle 38, Lumpinee Stadium	Bangkok, Thailand	KO (Punch)	1	2:37
2026-06-26	Loss	(Brazil) Julio Lobo	ONE The Inner Circle 22, Lumpinee Stadium	Bangkok, Thailand	TKO (Punches)	2	2:01
2026-03-20	Win	(United States) Arian Esparza	ONE Friday Fights 147, Lumpinee Stadium	Bangkok, Thailand	KO (Spinning elbow)	3	2:01
2025-12-19	Win	(Thailand) Kulabdam Sor.Jor.Piek-U-Thai	ONE Friday Fights 137, Lumpinee Stadium	Bangkok, Thailand	Decision (Majority)	3	3:00
2025-09-26	Win	(Italy) Alessio Malatesta	ONE Friday Fights 126, Lumpinee Stadium	Bangkok, Thailand	Decision (Split)	3	3:00
2025-06-27	Loss	(France) Elies Abdelali	ONE Friday Fights 114, Lumpinee Stadium	Bangkok, Thailand	Decision (Split)	3	3:00
2025-04-06	Win	(Senegal) Abdoulaye Diallo	THAI FIGHT Rome	Rome, Italy	Ext.R Decision (Unanimous)	4	3:00
2025-03-16	Win	(Iran) Keivan Soleimani	THAI FIGHT Nai Khanom Tom	Phra Nakhon Si Ayutthaya, Thailand	Decision (Unanimous)	3	3:00
2025-02-16	Win	(Brazil) Anderson Santiago	THAI FIGHT Ubon Ratchathani	Ubon Ratchathani, Thailand	Decision (Unanimous)	3	3:00
2024-12-22	Win	(Iran) Ahmad Masouminia	THAI FIGHT Phayao	Phayao province, Thailand	KO (Right cross)	2	
2024-11-24	Win	(Iran) Mohammad Mahdi	THAI FIGHT Kard Chuek Ajarn Tom	Roi Et, Thailand	KO (Body punch)	1	
2024-11-10	Win	(Morocco) Jaafar Oulichki	THAI FIGHT Qingdao	Qingdao, China	TKO (Leg injury)	1	
2024-08-04	Win	(Uzbekistan) Firdavs Erkinov	THAI FIGHT Mueang Khon	Nakhon Si Thammarat, Thailand	KO	1	
2024-07-07	Win	(Afghanistan) Hashem Jaghori	THAI FIGHT Kard Chuek Phraya Phicai Dap Hek	Uttaradit Province, Thailand	KO	2	
2024-03-24	Win	(Iran) Shayan Heydari	Thai Fight: Pluak Daeng	Rayong, Thailand	KO (Right uppercut)	2	
2024-02-25	Win	(Brazil) George Ferreira	Thai Fight: Phimai	Nakhon Ratchasima, Thailand	KO (Right cross)	1	
2023-12-24	Win	(Italy) Alessio Malatesta	Thai Fight: Luang Pu Thuad	Ayutthaya province, Thailand	Decision	3	3:00
Wins the 2023 THAI FIGHT Kard Chuek King's Cup -70kg Championship.
2023-11-26	Win	(Afghanistan) Hashem Jaghori	Thai Fight: Bang Kachao	Samut Prakan province, Thailand	KO	1	
2023-10-29	Win	(Morocco) Oussama El Kouche	THAI FIGHT Setthi Ruea Thong	Lopburi, Thailand	KO	2	
2023-06-18	Win	(China) Lan Jiacheng	THAI FIGHT Luk Luang Phor Sothorn	Chachoengsao, Thailand	KO	1	
2023-04-22	Loss	(Portugal) Miguel Trindade	THAI FIGHT Rome	Rome, Italy	KO (Left hook)	1	0:37
2023-02-26	Win	(Uganda) Award ChokdeeGym	Thai Fight KonlakPathum	Pathum Thani province, Thailand	TKO (punches)	1	
2023-02-04	Win	(Brazil) Adriano Oliveira	THAI FIGHT Luang Phor Ruay	Saraburi province, Thailand	KO (Punches)	1	
2022-12-24	Win	(Morocco) Omar Mahir	Thai Fight: Metropolitan Police Bureau 100th Anniversary	Bangkok, Thailand	KO (Punches)	1	
Wins the 2022 THAI FIGHT Kard Chuek King's Cup -70kg Championship.
2022-11-20	Win	(France) Expedito Valin	THAI FIGHT Vana Nava Hua Hin	Hua Hin district, Thailand	KO (Punches)	1	
2022-10-16	Win	(Cambodia) Thun Chantak	THAI FIGHT Vajiravudh	Bangkok, Thailand	KO (Punches)	1	
2022-06-26	Win	(Argentina) Cristian Pastore	THAI FIGHT Sisaket	Sisaket province, Thailand	KO	1	
2022-05-29	Win	(Iran) Mojtaba Talebi	THAI FIGHT Nakhon Sawan	Nakhon Sawan province, Thailand	KO (Straight to the body)	1	
2022-05-08	Win	(Brazil) Luiz Alves	THAI FIGHT Sung Noen	Sung Noen district, Thailand	KO (Punches)	1	
2022-04-17	Win	(Iran) Hamed Soleimani	THAI FIGHT KonlakPathum	Pathum Thani, Thailand	TKO (Punches)	1	
2022-03-20	Win	(France) Dylan Ofleidi	THAI FIGHT Lampang	Lampang, Thailand	KO (Elbow)	2	
2021-12-19	Win	(Algeria) Amrane Iskounen	THAI FIGHT Khao Aor	Phatthalung, Thailand	TKO	1	
2021-07-04	Win	(Portugal) Fabio Reis	THAI FIGHT Strong	Pattaya, Thailand	Decision	3	3:00
2021-04-25	Win	(United States) William Whipple	THAI FIGHT DMHTT	Samut Sakhon, Thailand	TKO (Doctor Stoppage)	1	
2021-04-03	Win	(Romania) Alexandru Bublea	THAI FIGHT Nan	Nan province, Thailand	Decision	3	3:00
2020-11-28	Win	(Argentina) Braian Allevato	THAI FIGHT Pluak Daeng	Rayong, Thailand	KO (Uppercut)	1	
2020-11-07	Win	(France) Sliman Zegnoun	THAI FIGHT Korat 2020	Nakhon Ratchasima, Thailand	KO (Right Cross)	1	
2020-10-17	Win	(Russia) Vladimir Oparin	Thai Fight Begins	Nonthaburi, Thailand	KO (Right Cross)	1	
2020-09-19	Win	(Netherlands) Parmit Grover	THAI FIGHT: New Normal	Bangkok, Thailand	KO (Elbows & punches)	1	
2019-12-21	Win	(Switzerland) Kofi Tuakama	THAI FIGHT: Thai Fest in Patong	Phuket, Thailand	TKO (Punches)	1	
2019-10-26	Win	(Norway) Muhammad Khalil	THAI FIGHT Bangsaen	Chonburi, Thailand	KO (Right elbow)	1	
2019-08-24	Win	(Iran) Mohammad Siasarani	THAI FIGHT Kham Chanod	Udon Thani, Thailand	TKO (Punches & knees)	1	
2019-06-29	Win	(Iran) Nima Vakili	THAI FIGHT Betong	Betong, Thailand	TKO (Punches)	2	
2019-03-30	Win	(Italy) Luca Lombardo	THAI FIGHT Mueang Khon	Nakhon Si Thammarat, Thailand	TKO (Punches)	2	
2019-02-23	Win	(France) Jason Polydor	THAI FIGHT Phuket	Phuket, Thailand	KO (Punches & knee)	1	
2018-12-22	Win	(Iran) Farhad Mandomi	THAI FIGHT Nakhon Ratchasima	Nakhon Ratchasima, Thailand	KO (Right Cross)	1	
2018-10-27	Loss	(Brazil) Diego Beneduzzi	THAI FIGHT Chiangrai 2018	Chiang Rai, Thailand	KO (Overhand Right)	1	
2018-08-25	Win	(Myanmar) Yan Naing Aung	THAI FIGHT Rayong	Rayong, Thailand	KO (Punches)	1	
2018-07-07	Win	(Myanmar) Tun Naing Oo	THAI FIGHT Hat Yai	Hat Yai, Thailand	KO (Low Kick)	1	
2018-05-12	Win	(Algeria) Walid Otmane	THAI FIGHT Samui	Ko Samui, Thailand	KO (Right Cross)	1	
2018-04-21	Win	(Italy) Samed Memaj	THAI FIGHT Rome	Rome, Italy	Decision	3	3:00
2018-03-24	Win	(Brazil) Cleber Moraes	THAI FIGHT Mueang Khon 2018	Nakhon Si Thammarat, Thailand	TKO (Punches)	1	
2018-01-27	Win	(France) Dany Njiba	THAI FIGHT Bangkok	Bangkok, Thailand	KO (Right Cross)	1	
Wins the THAI FIGHT Kard Chuek King's Cup -70kg Championship.
2017-12-23	Win	(Brazil) Victor Nunes	THAI FIGHT Chiang Mai	Chiang Mai, Thailand	KO (Right Cross)	1	
2017-11-25	Win	(Turkey) Gokhan Boran	KHMER - THAI FIGHT	Phnom Penh, Cambodia	Decision	3	3:00
2017-09-30	Win	(Spain) Jesus Romero	THAI FIGHT Barcelona	Barcelona, Spain	Decision	3	3:00
2017-07-15	Win	(Canada) Stephen Oppong	THAI FIGHT: We Love Yala	Thailand	KO (Right elbow)	1	
2017-05-27	Win	(Italy) Christian Zahe	THAI FIGHT Italy	Turin, Italy	TKO (Right elbow)	1	
2017-04-29	Win	(South Africa) Jarred Rothwell	THAI FIGHT Samui 2017	Ko Samui, Thailand	KO (Right Cross)	1	
2017-04-08	Win	(France) Charles François	THAI FIGHT Paris	Paris, France	Decision	3	3:00
2016-12-24	Win	(Canada) Sean Kearney	THAI FIGHT The Fighter King	Thailand	KO (Low kick)	1	
Wins the THAI FIGHT King's Cup -67kg Championship.
2016-11-19	Win	(Spain) Marc Rey	THAI FIGHT AIR RACE 1	Thailand	KO (Right Elbow)	1	
2016-10-15	Win	(Sweden) Christ Axelsson	THAI FIGHT Chengdu	Chengdu, China	Decision	3	3:00
2016-08-20	Win	(Iran) Keivan Soleimani	THAI FIGHT KMITL	Thailand	Decision	3	3:00
2016-07-23	Win	(Russia) Dmitrii Mordvinov	THAI FIGHT Proud to Be Thai	Thailand	KO (Left elbow)	3	
2016-04-30	Win	(Scotland) Craig Dickson	THAI FIGHT Samui 2016	Ko Samui, Thailand	Decision	3	3:00
2016-03-19	Win	(Thailand) Payaksamui Lukjaoporongtom	THAI FIGHT Korat - Isuzu Cup Superfight	Korat, Thailand	Decision	3	3:00
2016-02-27	Win	(Thailand) Diesellek Aoodonmuang	Omnoi Stadium - Isuzu Cup Final	Samut Sakhon, Thailand	Decision	5	3:00
Wins the 26th Isuzu Cup.
2015-12-19	Win	(Thailand) Saenguthai Sor.Jor.Piek-Uthai	Omnoi Stadium - Isuzu Cup Semi Final	Samut Sakhon, Thailand	Decision	5	3:00
2015-10-17	Win	(Thailand) Teded Sor.Serphet	Omnoi Stadium - Isuzu Cup	Samut Sakhon, Thailand	KO	3	
2015-09-12	Win	(Thailand) Diesellek Aoodonmuang	Omnoi Stadium - Isuzu Cup	Samut Sakhon, Thailand	Decision	5	3:00
2015-08-22	Win	(Thailand) Sorgraw Petchyindee Academy	Omnoi Stadium - Isuzu Cup	Samut Sakhon, Thailand	Decision	5	3:00
2015-07-29	Loss	(Thailand) Rittewada Sor.Nipapon		Songkla, Thailand	Decision	5	3:00
2015-06-20	Win	(Thailand) Simanoot Sor.Sarinya		Thailand	Decision	5	3:00
2015-05-02	Win	(Thailand) Saenguthai Sor.Jor.Piek-Uthai	JaoMuayThai, Omnoi Stadium	Samut Sakhon, Thailand	Decision	5	3:00
2015-03-21	Win	(Thailand) Theppabut Sit Ubon	JaoMuayThai, Omnoi Stadium	Samut Sakhon, Thailand	Decision	5	3:00
2015-01-25	Loss	(Thailand) Manasak Sor.Jor.Lekmuangnon	Rajadamnern Stadium	Bangkok, Thailand	Decision	5	3:00
2014-12-13	Win	(Thailand) Chok Sagami	JaoMuayThai, Omnoi Stadium	Samut Sakhon, Thailand	Decision	5	3:00
2014-09-25	Loss	(Thailand) Yodlekpet Or. Pitisak	Rajadamnern Stadium	Bangkok, Thailand	Decision	5	3:00
2014-07-22	Loss	(Thailand) Mongkolchai Phetsupapan	Phetsupapan	Thailand	KO	2	
2014-04-25	Draw	(Thailand) Saengtawan Aor Talaybangsaray	Phetsupapan, Lumpinee Stadium	Bangkok, Thailand	Decision	5	3:00
2014-01-24	Win	(Thailand) Nataphon Kiatawan	Weerapon, Lumpinee Stadium	Bangkok, Thailand	Decision	5	3:00
2013-11-22	Win	(Thailand) Petchsuvarnabhumi Por.Nipapon	Phetsupaphan, Lumpinee Stadium	Bangkok, Thailand	Decision	5	3:00
2013-10-08	Loss	(Thailand) Denpanom Ror.Kilacorath	Phetsupaphan, Lumpinee Stadium	Bangkok, Thailand	Decision	5	3:00
2013-09-07	Win	(Thailand) Chujaroen Dabransarakarm	JaoMuayThai, Omnoi Stadium	Samut Sakhon, Thailand	Decision	5	3:00
2013-07-13	Loss	(Thailand) Chaosuanoi Petsupapan	Omnoi Stadium	Samut Sakhon, Thailand	Decision	5	3:00
2013-05-18	Win	(Thailand) Liamphet Sitboonmee	Omnoi Stadium	Samut Sakhon, Thailand	Decision	5	3:00
2013-03-30	Win	(Thailand) Kaiwanlek Tor.Laksong	JaoMuayThai, Omnoi Stadium	Samut Sakhon, Thailand	Decision	5	3:00
2013-01-11	Loss	(Thailand) Nataphon Kiatawan	Phetsupapan, Lumpinee Stadium	Bangkok, Thailand	TKO (Elbow)	3	
2012-11-24	Win	(Thailand) Nataphon Kiatawan	Omnoi Stadium	Samut Sakhon, Thailand	Decision	5	3:00
Wins the Omnoi Stadium 130 lbs title.
2012-09-01	Win	(Thailand) Petchdam kilaKorat	Lumpinee Stadium	Bangkok, Thailand	KO	4	
2012-07-07	Win	(Thailand) Chaimongkol Petsupapan	Lumpinee Stadium	Bangkok, Thailand	Decision	5	3:00
2012-05-26	Win	(Thailand) Yodsiam Petsupapan	Lumpinee Stadium	Bangkok, Thailand	Decision	5	3:00
2012-03-24	Win	(Thailand) Yodsiam Petsupapan	Lumpinee Stadium	Bangkok, Thailand	Decision	5	3:00
2012-02-25	Win	(Thailand) Meknamchai Sor.Suriya	Omnoi Stadium	Samut Sakhon, Thailand	Decision	5	3:00
Legend: Win Loss Draw/No contest Notes
