= Thai Fight =

Thai boxing event

- Company type: Private
- Industry: Muay Thai promotion Muay Thai event organizer
- Founded: 2009
- Founder: Nopporn Wartin
- Headquarters: Bangkok, Thailand
- Key people: Nopparat Puttarattanamanee; Tanee Temboonsak
- Website: Official website

Thai Fight (Thai: ไทยไฟต์; stylized as THAI FIGHT in capitals) is a Muay Thai promotion based in Bangkok, Thailand, which hosts events worldwide and all across Thailand. Thai Fight events are produced in conjunction with the Tourism Authority of Thailand. The inaugural tournament took place on August 29, 2010, and the promotion has since featured notable fighters such as Youssef Boughanem, Sudsakorn Sor Klinmee, Saiyok Pumpanmuang, Yodsanklai Fairtex, Buakaw Banchamek and Saenchai.

In 2011, the King of Thailand Bhumibol Adulyadej (King Rama IX) started supporting the Thai Fight events and founded the Thai Fight King's Cup Tournament. The winners are awarded the King's Cup and a 1,000,000 Thai baht cash prize. The annual Thai Fight: King of Muay Thai tournament awards the finalist a grand prize of 2,000,000 baht and an Isuzu pickup truck.

== History ==
=== Creation ===
Thai Fight Co. Ltd. was founded by former film and television director Nopporn Wartin. His vision of spreading Thai culture and Thai traditions eventually led to the birth of the "Thai Fight" brand. Muay Thai being the national sport of Thailand, Wartin chose to use it as a platform to spread his vision to the rest of the world. The first Thai Fight event was hosted on August 29, 2010. Thai Fight fully embraces Thai cultural values and uniquely reflects Thai cultural identity.

=== Business ===
The Thai Fight office is located in the Wang Thonglang District of Bangkok.

After its founding in 2009, the company went on to host its first Thai Fight: King of Muay Thai tournament on August 29, 2010. Notable fighters who participated included Fabio Pinca, Youssef Boughanem, Liam Harrison and Vitaly Gurkov. The tournament concluded on December 6, 2010, with Pinca emerging as the first-ever Thai Fight champion.

In 2011, the promotion rose to further popularity with its signing of former K-1 World MAX champion and superstar Buakaw Banchamek, who would go on to win two Thai Fight tournaments in 2011 and 2012. However, he was engaged in a dispute with his gym at the time: Por. Pramuk. Buakaw appeared on THAI FIGHT Extreme 2012: Pattaya without the gym's approval, leading to them suing both him and Thai Fight. This resulted in Buakaw announcing his retirement from Muay Thai. Thai Fight would file a countersuit against Por. Pramuk, which eventually led to an agreement between all parties with withdraw all lawsuits. Buakaw fought on Thai Fight for the final time at Thai Fight 2012 on December 16, 2012, defeating Vitaly Gurkov to win the 70 kg King's Cup Tournament Championship.

Thai Fight held its first overseas event on May 14, 2011, with THAI FIGHT Extreme 2011: France in Cannes, France. In 2011, three of six Thai Fight events (titled THAI FIGHT Extreme) were held outside of Thailand, with the other two events taking place in Hong Kong and Japan. In 2012, Thai Fight also held two international events (also titled THAI FIGHT Extreme) in England and France. Between 2011 and 2013, ten THAI FIGHT Extreme events were hosted, five of which were held in foreign countries.

Thai Fight returned to hosting overseas events in 2014 (titled THAI FIGHT World Battle), visiting Macau and Vietnam. In 2015, the promotion held events (now titled THAI FIGHT Proud to Be Thai) in China, Russia and Vietnam. The promotion regularly hosts events internationally, in countries such as: Russia, Italy, Spain, Japan, Cambodia, Vietnam, France and England. However, there has not been an international event since 2018.

On November 25, 2017, Thai Fight held the historic KHMER THAI FIGHT event. The event was held to strengthen ties between Thailand and Cambodia. Being held in Phnom Penh, Cambodia, the event was unlike previous Thai Fight events due to the fact that it featured both Muay Thai and Kun Khmer matches, with the event pitting the Southeast Asian fighters against various foreign fighters.

As a result of the COVID-19 pandemic, Thai Fight held its first event behind closed doors in 11 years, with THAI FIGHT DMHTT at Siam Omnoi Stadium on April 25, 2021.

=== Tourism ===
The promotion is run in conjunction with the Tourism Authority of Thailand and is aimed at promoting tourism in various provinces of the Kingdom of Thailand.

=== Thai Fight Kard Chuek ===
In 2013, the promotion produced a reality television show where Thai Fight stars Sudsakorn Sor Klinmee and Saiyok Pumpanmuang coached a team of farang on the reality television series Thai Fight Kard Chuek, to be shown over between July and August 2013 on Thailand's Channel 3. Notable fighters who appeared on the series included Youssef Boughanem and Tun Tun Min (credited as Zaw Tum). On December 22, 2013, the two coaches faced each other in the Thai Fight Kard Chuek Final, where Sor Klinmee defeated Pumpanmuang by extension-round decision to claim the 6,000,000 baht grand prize.

Thai Fight Kard Chuek also refers to the format of Muay Thai where fighters use rope bindings in place of gloves to pay homage to Muay boran, the historical form of the sport, with modern Muay Thai rules in place. Since 2014, most fights in Thai Fight have been predominantly fought under Kard Chuek rules with few exceptions using gloves.

=== Thai Fight League ===
In April 2023, Thai Fight announced a new weekly program called Thai Fight League, which would feature upcoming Muay Thai fighters. The event would take place at Beat Active in BITEC Bangna. The inaugural event aired on May 7, 2023, on Channel 8 at 6:00 PM, featuring exclusively Kard Chuek fights. Thai Fight League also served as the venue for the 32nd edition of the Isuzu Cup tournament, changing the tournament format from 5-round fights to 3-round fights as well.

=== Sponsorship ===
The brand Thailand Graphite Co. Ltd, Isuzu, Thai Beverage and the Tourism Authority of Thailand are sponsors of the promotion.

== Broadcasting ==
For almost a decade, Thai Fight's longtime television partner was Channel 3. In 2020, it was announced that Thai Fight had entered a partnership with Channel 8, joining Muay Thai programs Super Champ Muay Thai and Muay Hardcore . Thai Fight events were broadcast on Channel 8 until 2025.

Television broadcast
Broadcaster	Years
Channel 3 HD 33, SD 28	2010–2020
Channel 8	2020–2025
PPTV	2026–present

Beginning in 2019, the Thai Fight official YouTube channel also began broadcasting events via the YouTube livestreaming function.

== Rules ==
=== Match length ===
Thai Fight deviates from customary Muay Thai by hosting three-round matches, as opposed to five rounds. This is to prevent stalling and encourage more activity between fighters. Each fight consists of three rounds of three minutes with 2-minute rest periods between each round.

In the event of a draw after 3 rounds, a fourth extension round will be fought. If the fight is still tied after 4 rounds, a fifth round will be fought to determine a winner.

=== Judging ===
Fights can be won by decision, knockout or technical knockout. Three knockdowns will automatically result in a technical knockout.

In Thai Fight, knockdowns are scored differently from conventional Muay Thai and kickboxing. If a knockdown is scored, the dominant fighter will be awarded 10–9 round. In the event a fighter scores two knockdowns in the same round, the round will be scored 10–8 in favor of the dominant fighter. Otherwise, rounds are judged based on a fighter's aggression, striking volume and use of Muay Thai techniques. In recent Thai Fight events, use of certain mae mai and luk mai techniques can earn a fighter performance-based cash bonuses.

=== Weight classes ===
While there are no official weight classes in Thai Fight, with superfights being held at varying weight classes, there are 4 titles across three weight classes during the Thai Fight King's Cup Tournament.

The inaugural Thai Fight tournament in 2010 saw fighters contesting for the 67 kg welterweight tournament title. The 2011 tournament saw the introduction of the 70 kg title. Up until 2013, the only tournament titles in Thai Fight were the 67 kg and 70 kg King's Cup Tournament. The 70 kg Kard Chuek title was first contested for in 2013. In 2014, the first Thai Fight 72.5 kg King's Cup Tournament was held. Thai Fight also held a one-time Heavyweight Tournament in 2012, where fighters weighing over 100 kilograms competed.

Division	Upper weight limit
Welterweight	67 kg (148 lb)
Junior Middleweight	70 kg (154 lb)
Middleweight	72.5 kg (160 lb)

== Events ==
#	Event	Date	Venue	City
106	THAI FIGHT Petchaburi	June 8, 2025	King Mongkut Memorial Park Phra Nakhon Khiri	Phetchaburi, Thailand
105	THAI FIGHT Rome	April 6, 2025	PalaTiazano	Rome, Italy
104	THAI FIGHT Nai Khanom Tom	March 16, 2025	Luang Por Ruay Pasathiko Foundation's activity area	Ayutthaya, Thailand
103	THAI FIGHT Ubon Ratchatani	February 16, 2025	Sunee Tower activity area	Ubon Ratchatani, Thailand
102	THAI FIGHT Phayao	December 22, 2024	Pho Khun Ngam Muang Monument	Phayao, Thailand
101	THAI FIGHT Ajarn Tom	November 24, 2024	Lan Hor Wot	Roi Et, Thailand
100	THAI FIGHT QINGDAO	November 10, 2024	Chengyang Stadium	Shandong, China
99	THAI FIGHT Sethi Ruea Thong	October 20, 2024	Activity Area	Lopburi, Thailand
98	THAI FIGHT Mueang Khon	August 4, 2024	Central Plaza Nakhon Si Thammarat	Nakhon Si Thammarat, Thailand
97	THAI FIGHT Phraya Phichai Dap Hak	July 7, 2024	Phraya Phichai Dap Hak Stadium	Uttaradit, Thailand
96	THAI FIGHT Pluak Daeng	March 24, 2024	CK Plaza	Rayong, Thailand
95	THAI FIGHT Phimai	February 25, 2024	Brahmathat	Nakhon Ratchasima, Thailand
94	THAI FIGHT Rajabhakti Park	February 4, 2024	Rajabhakti Park	Hua Hin, Prachuap Khiri Khan, Thailand
93	THAI FIGHT Lung Pu Thuat	December 24, 2023	Phuttha Utthayan Maharat at Wat Wachira Thammaram	Ayutthaya province, Thailand
92	THAI FIGHT Bang Kachao	November 26, 2023	Kung Bang Kachao Activity Area Phet Hueng 7	Samut Prakan province, Thailand
91	THAI FIGHT Sethi Ruea Thong	October 30, 2023	Activity area at Wat Phu Noi	Lopburi province, Thailand
90	THAI FIGHT Luk Luang Phor Sothorn	June 18, 2023	Community Dome at Wat Saman Rattanaram Hospital	Chachoengsao province, Thailand
89	THAI FIGHT 100 Years Rajabhat Korat	May 21, 2023	Nakhon Ratchasima Rajabhat University	Nakhon Ratchasima, Thailand
88	THAI FIGHT Rome 2	April 22, 2023	Palacesaroni	Rome, Italy
87	THAI FIGHT KonLakPathum 2	February 26, 2023	Jumbo Market	Pathum Thani, Thailand
86	THAI FIGHT Luang Phor Ruay	February 5, 2023	Courtyard beside Wat Cherng Khao	Saraburi, Thailand
85	THAI FIGHT 100 Years Metropolitan	December 24, 2022	The courtyard in front of Nimibutr Stadium	Bangkok, Thailand
84	THAI FIGHT Vana Nava Huahin	November 20, 2022	True Arena Huahin	Hua Hin, Prachuap Khiri Khan, Thailand
83	THAI FIGHT Vajiravudh	October 16, 2022	Asiatique the Riverfront	Bangkok, Thailand
82	THAI FIGHT Sisaket	June 26, 2022	Pooyai Heng's Sports Arena	Sisaket, Thailand
81	THAI FIGHT Nakhon Sawan	May 29, 2022	Ban Rai Subdistrict Administrative Organization	Nakhon Sawan, Thailand
80	THAI FIGHT Sung Noen	May 8, 2022	Prasat Muang Khaek	Suen Noen, Nakhon Ratchasima, Thailand
79	THAI FIGHT KonLak Pathum	April 17, 2022	Nakorn Rangsit Multipurpose Square	Pathum Thani, Thailand
78	THAI FIGHT Lampang	March 20, 2022	Wat Phra That Lampang Luang	Lampang, Thailand
77	THAI FIGHT Khao Aor	December 19, 2021	Wat Khao Aor Stadium	Phatthalung, Thailand
76	THAI FIGHT Strong	July 4, 2021	JF Boxing Pattaya	Pattaya, Chonburi, Thailand
75	THAI FIGHT DMHTT	April 25, 2021	Omnoi Stadium	Samut Sakhon, Thailand
74	THAI FIGHT Nan	April 3, 2021	Pa Pei Yard, Huaen Hung Tor	Nan, Thailand
73	THAI FIGHT Pluak Daeng	November 28, 2020	CK Plaza	Rayong, Thailand
72	THAI FIGHT Korat 2020	November 7, 2020	City Hall Ground	Nakhon Ratchasima, Thailand
71	THAI FIGHT Begins	October 17, 2020	CentralPlaza Westgate	Nonthaburi, Thailand
70	THAI FIGHT New Normal	September 19, 2020	MCC Hall the Mall Bangkapi	Bangkok, Thailand
69	THAI FIGHT Thai Fest in Patong	December 21, 2019	The Myth Patong	Phuket, Thailand
68	THAI FIGHT Mae Sot	November 23, 2019	Naresuan Stadium	Mae Sot, Tak, Thailand
67	THAI FIGHT Bangsaen	October 26, 2019	Laem Thaen Bangsaen	Bang Saen Beach, Chonburi, Thailand
66	THAI FIGHT Kham Chanod	August 24, 2019	Montatip Hall at UD Town	Udon Thani, Thailand
65	THAI FIGHT Betong	June 29, 2019	Betong Municipal Stadium	Betong, Yala, Thailand
64	THAI FIGHT Samui 2019	April 27, 2019	Phru Chaweng	Ko Samui, Surat Thani, Thailand
63	THAI FIGHT Mueang Khon 2019	March 30, 2019	CentralPlaza Nakhon Si Thammarat	Nakhon Si Thammarat, Thailand
62	THAI FIGHT Phuket	February 23, 2019	Laguna Phuket	Phuket, Thailand
61	THAI FIGHT Nakhon Ratchasima	December 22, 2018	City Hall Ground	Nakhon Ratchasima, Thailand
60	THAI FIGHT Saraburi	November 24, 2018	Wat Phra Phutthabat	Saraburi, Thailand
59	THAI FIGHT Chiang Rai	October 27, 2018	CentralPlaza Chiang Rai	Chiang Rai, Thailand
58	THAI FIGHT Rayong	August 15, 2018	Makro Hall Rayong	Rayong, Thailand
57	THAI FIGHT Hat Yai	July 17, 2018	Khlong Hae City Square	Hat Yai, Songkhla, Thailand
56	THAI FIGHT Samui 2018	May 12, 2018	Phru Chaweng	Ko Samui, Surat Thani, Thailand
55	THAI FIGHT Rome	April 21, 2018	Atlantico Live	Rome, Italy
54	THAI FIGHT Mueang Khon	March 24, 2018	CentralPlaza Nakhon Si Thammarat	Nakhon Si Thammarat, Thailand
53	THAI FIGHT 2017 Bangkok	January 27, 2018	Bangkok City Hall Square	Bangkok, Thailand
52	THAI FIGHT Chiang Mai	December 23, 2017	CentralPlaza Chiang Mai Airport	Chiang Mai, Thailand
51	KHMER THAI FIGHT	November 25, 2017	Phnom Penh Olympic Indoor Stadium	Phnom Penh, Cambodia
50	THAI FIGHT Barcelona	September 30, 2017	Palau dels Esports de Barcelona	Barcelona, Spain
50	THAI FIGHT We Love Yala	July 15, 2017	Yala Sports University	Yala, Thailand
49	THAI FIGHT Italy	May 27, 2017	PalaRuffini	Turin, Italy
48	THAI FIGHT Samui 2017	April 29, 2017	Phru Chaweng	Ko Samui, Surat Thani, Thailand
47	THAI FIGHT The Fighter King	December 24, 2016	CentralWorld Square	Bangkok, Thailand
46	THAI FIGHT AIR RACE 1	November 19, 2016	U-Tapao International Airport	Rayong, Thailand
45	THAI FIGHT Chengdu	October 15, 2016	Sichuan Emeisun City Stadium	Chengdu, China
44	THAI FIGHT London	September 11, 2016	Indigo at the O2 Arena	London, England, U.K.
43	THAI FIGHT KMITL	August 20, 2016	King Mongkut's Institute of Technology Ladkrabang	Bangkok, Thailand
42	THAI FIGHT Proud to Be Thai	July 23, 2016	Westgate Hall floor4	Nonthaburi, Thailand
41	THAI FIGHT Samui 2016	April 30, 2016	Phru Chaweng	Ko Samui, Surat Thani, Thailand
40	THAI FIGHT Paris	April 18, 2016	Stade Pierre de Coubertin	Paris, France
39	THAI FIGHT Korat	March 19, 2016	Thao Suranari Monument	Nakhon Ratchasima, Thailand
38	THAI FIGHT Count Down	December 31, 2015	CentralPlaza Ratchaprasong	Bangkok, Thailand
37	THAI FIGHT 2015: 2nd Round	November 21, 2015	Royal Police Cadet Academy Sampharn	Nakhon Pathom, Thailand
36	THAI FIGHT 2015: First Round	October 24, 2015	Quân khu 7 Stadium	Ho Chi Minh City, Vietnam
35	THAI FIGHT Proud to Be Thai 2015: Moscow	September 17, 2015	Ray Just Arena	Moscow, Russia
34	THAI FIGHT Proud to Be Thai 2015: 100 Years Narathiwat	August 22, 2015	Maharat Stadium, Su-ngai Kolok	Narathiwat, Thailand
33	THAI FIGHT Proud to Be Thai 2015: China	July 18, 2015	Henan Indoor Stadium	Zhengzhou, China
32	THAI FIGHT Proud to Be Thai 2015: Samui	May 12, 2015	Phru Chaweng	Ko Samui, Surat Thani, Thailand
31	THAI FIGHT Proud to Be Thai 2015: CRMA	April 14, 2015	Chulachomklao Royal Military Academy	Nakhon Nayok, Thailand
30	THAI FIGHT 2014: Competition for the Championship Round	December 21, 2014	Asiatique the Riverfront	Bangkok, Thailand
29	THAI FIGHT 2014: 2nd Round	November 22, 2014	Wufoo Shopping Center	Khon Kaen, Thailand
28	THAI FIGHT 2014: First Round	October 25, 2014	MCC Hall the Mall Bangkapi	Bangkok, Thailand
27	THAI FIGHT World Battle 2014: Vietnam	September 20, 2014	Phú Thọ Indoor Stadium	Ho Chi Minh City, Vietnam
26	THAI FIGHT World Battle 2014: Nakhon Sawan	August 16, 2014	Nakhon Sawan Gymnasium	Nakhon Sawan, Thailand
25	THAI FIGHT World Battle 2014: Macao	June 28, 2014	Cotai Arena	Macau, SAR, China
24	THAI FIGHT World Battle 2014: Chakrinaruebet	April 16, 2014	HTMS Chakri Naruebet	Sattahip, Chonburi, Thailand
23	THAI FIGHT World Battle 2014: Klai Kang Won	February 22, 2014	Hua Hin Queen's Park	Hua Hin, Prachuap Khiri Khan, Thailand
22	THAI FIGHT 2013: Competition for the Championship Round	December 22, 2013	Sanam Luang	Bangkok, Thailand
21	THAI FIGHT 2013: 2nd Round	November 30, 2013	MCC Hall the Mall Bangkapi	Bangkok, Thailand
20	THAI FIGHT 2013: First Round	October 23, 2013	Nimibutr Stadium	Bangkok, Thailand
19	THAI FIGHT Extreme 2013: Pattani	September 22, 2013	Rainbow Stadium	Pattani, Thailand
18	THAI FIGHT Extreme 2013: Bangkok	June 29, 2013	MCC Hall the Mall Bangkapi	Bangkok, Thailand
17	THAI FIGHT Extreme 2013: Pattaya	April 19, 2013	Bali Hai Pier	Pattaya, Thailand
16	THAI FIGHT Extreme 2013: Muay Thai Day	February 23, 2013	Wat Mahathat Ayutthaya	Ayutthaya, Thailand
15	THAI FIGHT 2012: Competition for the Championship Round	December 16, 2012	Equestrian statue of King Chulalongkorn Square	Bangkok, Thailand
14	THAI FIGHT 2012: 2nd Round	November 25, 2012	Korat Chatchai Hall	Nakhon Ratchasima, Thailand
13	THAI FIGHT 2012: First Round	October 23, 2012	Chanchai Acadium	Bangkok, Thailand
12	THAI FIGHT Extreme 2012: France	September 19, 2012	Palais des Sports de Gerland	Lyon, France
11	THAI FIGHT Extreme 2012: England	August 17, 2012	King Power Stadium	Leicester, England, U.K.
10	THAI FIGHT Extreme 2012: Pattaya	April 17, 2012	Bali Hai Pier	Pattaya, Thailand
9	THAI FIGHT 2011: Competition for the Championship Round	December 18, 2011	Equestrian statue of King Chulalongkorn Square	Bangkok, Thailand
8	THAI FIGHT 2011: 2nd Round	November 27, 2011	Imperial World Samrong	Samut Prakan, Thailand
7	THAI FIGHT 2011: First Round	September 25, 2011	Thammasat Rangsit Convention Center	Pathum Thani, Thailand
6	THAI FIGHT Extreme 2011: Japan	August 17, 2011	Ariake Coliseum	Tokyo, Japan
5	THAI FIGHT Extreme 2011: Hong Kong	July 17, 2011	AsiaWorld Arena	Hong Kong, SAR, China
4	THAI FIGHT Extreme 2011: France	May 14, 2011	Palm Beach Cannes	Cannes, France
3	THAI FIGHT 2010: Competition for the Championship Round	December 6, 2010	80th Birthday Stadium	Nakhon Ratchasima, Thailand
2	THAI FIGHT 2010: 2nd Round	October 23, 2010	Indoor Stadium Huamark	Bangkok, Thailand
1	THAI FIGHT 2010: First Round	August 29, 2010	Indoor Stadium Huamark	Bangkok, Thailand

== Champions ==
=== Thai Fight King's Cups ===
Starting in 2010, his majesty Bhumibol Adulyadej (King Rama IX) started gracing the trophies of the Thai Fight annual tournaments. The annual Thai Fight King's Cup Tournament sees international fighters competing against Thailand's elite athletes and the winners of each weight divisions are awarded the King's Cups and 1,000,000 Thai baht. Since his succession to the throne, King Maha Vajiralongkorn has continued the tradition started by his father.

The 2020 schedule saw the introduction of the Queen's Cup, bestowed by Queen Suthida, which will be the first women's tournament in Thai Fight.

Event	King
King's Cup 2020	King's Cups from King Vajiralongkorn / Queen's Cup from Queen Suthida
King's Cup 2019	King's Cup from King Vajiralongkorn
King's Cup 2018	King's Cup from King Vajiralongkorn
King's Cup 2017	King's Cup from King Bhumibol Adulyadej & Vajiralongkorn
King's Cup 2016	King's Cup from King Bhumibol Adulyadej
King's Cup 2015	King's Cup from King Bhumibol Adulyadej
King's Cup 2014	King's Cup from King Bhumibol Adulyadej
King's Cup 2013	King's Cup from King Bhumibol Adulyadej
King's Cup 2012	King's Cup from King Bhumibol Adulyadej
King's Cup 2011	King's Cup from King Bhumibol Adulyadej

=== Tournament Champions ===
The annual Thai Fight: King of Muay Thai tournament sees international and local fighters compete for the grand prize of 2,000,000 Thai baht and an Isuzu pickup truck.

Event	Date	Division	Champion
Thai Fight 2010	December 6, 2010	Welterweight / 67 kg	Fabio Pinca
Thai Fight 2011	December 18, 2011	Welterweight / 67 kg	Kem Sitsongpeenong
Thai Fight 2011	December 18, 2011	Junior middleweight / 70 kg	Buakaw Banchamek
Thai Fight 2012	December 16, 2012	Welterweight / 67 kg	Singmanee Kaewsamrit
Thai Fight 2012	December 16, 2012	Junior middleweight / 70 kg	Buakaw Banchamek
Thai Fight 2012	December 16, 2012	Heavyweight / 100+ kg	Patrice Quarteron
Thai Fight 2013	December 22, 2013	Welterweight / 67 kg	Fahmongkol Sor.Jor.Danrayong
Thai Fight 2013	December 22, 2013	Junior middleweight / 70 kg	Yodsanklai Fairtex
Thai Fight 2013	December 22, 2013	Junior middleweight / 70 kg (Kard Chuek)	Sudsakorn Sor Klinmee
Thai Fight 2014	December 21, 2014	Junior middleweight / 70 kg (Kard Chuek)	Yodsanklai Fairtex
Thai Fight 2014	December 21, 2014	Middleweight / 72.5 kg	Saiyok Pumpanmuang
THAI FIGHT Count Down	December 31, 2015	Junior middleweight / 70 kg	Tengnueng Sitjaesairoong
THAI FIGHT Count Down	December 31, 2015	Middleweight / 72.5 kg	Youssef Boughanem
THAI FIGHT The Fighter King	December 24, 2016	Welterweight / 67 kg	P.T.T. Petchrungrueng
THAI FIGHT The Fighter King	December 24, 2016	Junior middleweight / 70 kg	Saenchai
THAI FIGHT 2017 Bangkok	January 27, 2018	Welterweight / 67 kg	Saenchai
THAI FIGHT 2017 Bangkok	January 27, 2018	Junior middleweight / 70 kg	Saensatharn P.K. Saenchai Muaythaigym
THAI FIGHT 2017 Bangkok	January 27, 2018	Junior middleweight / 70 kg (Kard Chuek)	P.T.T. Petchrungrueng
THAI FIGHT 2017 Bangkok	January 27, 2018	Middleweight / 72.5 kg	Chanajon P.K. Saenchai Muaythaigym
THAI FIGHT Nakhon Ratchasima	December 22, 2018	Welterweight / 67 kg	Saenchai
THAI FIGHT Nakhon Ratchasima	December 22, 2018	Junior middleweight / 70 kg	Satanfah Rachanon
THAI FIGHT Nakhon Ratchasima	December 22, 2018	Junior middleweight / 70 kg (Kard Chuek)	Saensatharn P.K.Saenchai Muaythaigym
THAI FIGHT Nakhon Ratchasima	December 22, 2018	Middleweight / 72.5 kg	Payak-Samui Lukjaoporongtom
THAI FIGHT Thai Fest in Patong	December 21, 2019	Welterweight / 67 kg	Amir Naseri
THAI FIGHT Thai Fest in Patong	December 21, 2019	Junior middleweight / 70 kg	Saenchai
THAI FIGHT Thai Fest in Patong	December 21, 2019	Junior middleweight / 70 kg (Kard Chuek)	Kitti Sor.Jor.Danrayong
THAI FIGHT Khao Aor	December 19, 2021	Women's Flyweight / 51 kg	Petchjeeja Lukjaoporongtom
THAI FIGHT Khao Aor	December 19, 2021	Welterweight / 67 kg	Kongklai AnnyMuayThai
THAI FIGHT Khao Aor	December 19, 2021	Middleweight / 72.5 kg (Kard Chuek)	Tengnueng Sitjaesairoong
THAI FIGHT Khao Aor	December 19, 2021	Junior middleweight / 70 kg (Kard Chuek)	Kitti Sor.Jor.Danrayong
THAI FIGHT 100 Years Metropolitan	December 24, 2022	Women's 53 kg (Kard Chuek)	Vero Nika
THAI FIGHT 100 Years Metropolitan	December 24, 2022	Welterweight / 67 kg	Petchthongchai TBM Gym
THAI FIGHT 100 Years Metropolitan	December 24, 2022	Middleweight / 72.5 kg (Kard Chuek)	Thoeun Theara
THAI FIGHT 100 Years Metropolitan	December 24, 2022	Junior middleweight / 70 kg	Saenchai
THAI FIGHT 100 Years Metropolitan	December 24, 2022	Junior middleweight / 70 kg (Kard Chuek)	Por.Tor.Thor. Petchrungruang
THAI FIGHT Luang Pu Thuat	December 24, 2023	Women's 54 kg (Kard Chuek)	Vero Nika
THAI FIGHT Luang Pu Thuat	December 24, 2023	Welterweight / 67 kg	Suksawat Saengmorakot
THAI FIGHT Luang Pu Thuat	December 24, 2023	Middleweight / 72.5 kg (Kard Chuek)	Tengnueng Sitjaesairoong
THAI FIGHT Luang Pu Thuat	December 24, 2023	Junior middleweight / 70 kg	Nong-O Chor.Hapayak
THAI FIGHT Luang Pu Thuat	December 24, 2023	Junior middleweight / 70 kg (Kard Chuek)	Por.Tor.Thor. Petchrungruang

== Championship history ==
=== Heavyweight / 100+ kg King's Cup Championship ===
No.	Name	Event	Date
1	(France) Patrice Quarteron def. Dmitry Bezus	Thai Fight 2012; Bangkok, Thailand	December 16, 2012

=== Middleweight / 72.5 kg King's Cup Championship ===
No.	Name	Event	Date
1	(Thailand) Saiyok Pumpanmuang def. Antoine Pinto	Thai Fight 2014; Bangkok, Thailand	December 21, 2014
2	(Belgium) Youssef Boughanem def. Sudsakorn Sor Klinmee	THAI FIGHT Count Down; Bangkok, Thailand	December 31, 2015
3	(Thailand) Chanajon P.K. Saenchai Muaythaigym def. Saiyok Pumpanmuang	THAI FIGHT Bangkok 2017; Bangkok, Thailand	January 27, 2018
4	(Thailand) Payak-Samui Lukjaoporongtom def. Yurik Davtyan	THAI FIGHT Nakhon Ratchasima; Nakhon Ratchasima, Thailand	December 22, 2018

=== Middleweight / 72.5 kg Kard Chuek King's Cup Championship ===
No.	Name	Event	Date
1	(Thailand) Tengnueng Sitjaesairoong def. Thomas Carpenter	THAI FIGHT Khao Aor; Phatthalung, Thailand	December 19, 2021
2	(Cambodia) Thoeun Theara def. Saiyok Pumpanmuang	THAI FIGHT 100 Years Metropolitan; Bangkok, Thailand	December 24, 2022
3	(Thailand) Tengnueng Sitjaesairoong def. Abolfazl Mehrazaran	THAI FIGHT Luang Pu Thuat; Ayutthaya, Thailand	December 24, 2023

=== Junior Middleweight / 70 kg King's Cup Championship ===
No.	Name	Event	Date
1	(Thailand) Buakaw Banchamek def. Franki Giorgi	Thai Fight 2011; Bangkok, Thailand	December 18, 2011
2	(Thailand) Buakaw Banchamek def. Vitaly Gurkov	Thai Fight 2012; Bangkok, Thailand	December 16, 2012
3	(Thailand) Yodsanklai Fairtex def. Expedito Valin	Thai Fight 2013; Bangkok, Thailand	December 22, 2013
4	(Thailand) Tengnueng Sitjaesairoong def. Jose Neto	THAI FIGHT Count Down; Bangkok, Thailand	December 31, 2015
5	(Thailand) Saenchai def. Julio Lobo	THAI FIGHT The Fighter King; Bangkok, Thailand	December 24, 2016
6	(Thailand) Saensatharn P.K. Saenchai Muaythaigym def. Naimjon Tuhtaboyev	THAI FIGHT Bangkok 2017; Bangkok, Thailand	January 27, 2018
7	(Thailand) Satanfah Rachanon def. Boburjon Tagayev	THAI FIGHT Nakhon Ratchasima; Nakhon Ratchasima, Thailand	December 22, 2018
8	(Thailand) Saenchai def. Tophik Abdullaev	THAI FIGHT Thai Fest in Patong; Phuket, Thailand	December 21, 2019
9	(Thailand) Saenchai def. Elit Honkorng	THAI FIGHT 100 Years Metropolitan; Bangkok, Thailand	December 24, 2022
10	(Thailand) Nong-O Chor.Hapayak def. Arman Moradi	THAI FIGHT Luang Pu Thuat; Ayutthaya, Thailand	December 24, 2023

=== Junior Middleweight / 70 kg Kard Chuek King's Cup Championship ===
No.	Name	Event	Date
1	(Thailand) Sudsakorn Sor Klinmee def. Saiyok Pumpanmuang	Thai Fight 2013; Bangkok, Thailand	December 22, 2013
2	(Thailand) Yodsanklai Fairtex def. Christophe Pruvost	Thai Fight 2014; Bangkok, Thailand	December 21, 2014
3	(Thailand) P.T.T. Petchrungrueng def. Dany Njiba	THAI FIGHT Bangkok 2017; Bangkok, Thailand	January 27, 2018
4	(Ukraine) Sasha Moisa def. Saensatharn P.K. Saenchai Muaythaigym (forfeit)	THAI FIGHT Nakhon Ratchasima; Nakhon Ratchasima, Thailand	December 22, 2018
5	(Thailand) Kitti Sor.Jor.Danrayong def. Gabriel Mazzetti	THAI FIGHT Thai Fest in Patong; Phuket, Thailand	December 21, 2019
6	(Thailand) Kitti Sor.Jor.Danrayong def. Thiago Teixeira	THAI FIGHT Khao Aor; Phatthalung, Thailand	December 19, 2021
7	(Thailand) P.T.T. Vor.Rujirawong def. Omar Mahir	THAI FIGHT 100 Years Metropolitan; Bangkok, Thailand	December 24, 2022
8	(Thailand) P.T.T. Vor.Rujirawong def. Alessio Malatesta	THAI FIGHT Luang Pu Thuat; Ayutthaya, Thailand	December 24, 2023

=== Welterweight / 67 kg King's Cup Championship ===
No.	Name	Event	Date
1	(France) Fabio Pinca def. Youssef Boughanem	Thai Fight 2010; Nakhon Ratchasima, Thailand	December 6, 2010
2	(Thailand) Kem Sitsongpeenong def. Fabio Pinca	Thai Fight 2011; Bangkok, Thailand	December 18, 2011
3	(Thailand) Singmanee Kaewsamrit def. Andrei Kulebin	Thai Fight 2012; Bangkok, Thailand	December 16, 2012
4	(Thailand) Fahmongkol Sor.Jor.Danrayong def. Ruslan Kushnirenko	Thai Fight 2013; Bangkok, Thailand	December 22, 2013
5	(Thailand) P.T.T. Petchrungrueng def. Sean Kearney	THAI FIGHT The Fighter King; Bangkok, Thailand	December 24, 2016
6	(Thailand) Saenchai def. Henrique Muller	THAI FIGHT Bangkok 2017; Bangkok, Thailand	January 27, 2018
7	(Thailand) Saenchai def. Jamal Madani	THAI FIGHT Nakhon Ratchasima; Nakhon Ratchasima, Thailand	December 22, 2018
8	(Iran) Amir Naseri def. Petch-Samui Lukjaoporongtom	THAI FIGHT Thai Fest in Patong; Phuket, Thailand	December 21, 2019
9	(Thailand) Kongklai AnnyMuayThai def. Alessandro Sara	THAI FIGHT Khao Aor; Phatthalung, Thailand	December 19, 2021
10	(Thailand) Petchtongchai TBM Gym def. Teeradet Chor.Hapayak	THAI FIGHT 100 Years Metropolitan; Bangkok, Thailand	December 24, 2022
11	(Thailand) Suksawat Saengmorakot def. Vahid Nikkah	THAI FIGHT Luang Pu Thuat; Ayutthaya, Thailand	December 24, 2023

=== Women's Bantamweight / 53-54 kg Queen's Cup Championship ===
No.	Name	Event	Date
1	(Myanmar) Vero Nika def. Fani Peloumpi	THAI FIGHT 100 Years Metropolitan; Bangkok, Thailand	December 24, 2022
2	(Myanmar) Vero Nika def. Phayasingha Sor.Sommit	THAI FIGHT Luang Pu Thuat; Ayutthaya, Thailand	December 24, 2023

=== Women's Flyweight / 51 kg Queen's Cup Championship ===
No.	Name	Event	Date
1	(Thailand) Petchjeeja Lukjaoporongtom def. Rungnapha Por. Muangpetch	THAI FIGHT Khao Aor; Phatthalung, Thailand	December 19, 2021

== Isuzu Cup Superfight ==
Since 2012, Thai Fight has also hosted the Isuzu Cup Superfight. The Isuzu Cup Superfight is the only instance in Thai Fight where Thai fighters face each other. The winner of the Isuzu Cup Tournament is pitted against a hand-picked fighter from Thai Fight to contest for a multi-fight contract with the organization.

=== List of Isuzu Cup Superfight winners ===
Event	Date	Division	Champion
THAI FIGHT Extreme 2012: Pattaya	April 17, 2012	67 kg	Singmanee Kaewsamrit
THAI FIGHT Extreme 2013: Pattaya	April 19, 2013	67 kg	Fahmongkol Sor.Jor.Danrayong
THAI FIGHT World Battle 2014: Chakrinaruebet	April 6, 2014	70 kg	Saiyok Pumpanmuang
THAI FIGHT Proud to Be Thai 2015: CRMA	April 4, 2015	70 kg	Tengnueng Sitjaesairoong
THAI FIGHT Korat	March 19, 2016	67 kg	P.T.T. Petchrungrueng
THAI FIGHT Samui 2017	April 29, 2017	70 kg	Saensatharn P.K. Saenchai Muaythaigym
THAI FIGHT Samui 2018	May 12, 2018	67 kg	Satanfah Rachanon
THAI FIGHT Samui 2019	April 27, 2019	62 kg	Petch-Samui Lukjaoporongtom
THAI FIGHT Pluak Daeng	November 28, 2020	64 kg	Kongklai AnnyMuayThai
THAI FIGHT Sung Noen	May 8, 2022	65 kg	Petchtongchai TBM Gym

== Notable fighters ==
- (Thailand) Saenchai (5× Lumpinee Stadium Champion, WBC Muaythai Champion)
- (Thailand) Saensatharn P.K. Saenchai Muaythaigym (Lumpinee Stadium Champion, WMC Champion)
- (Thailand) Chanajon P.K. Saenchai Muaythaigym (Rajadamnern Stadium Champion)
- (Thailand) Kitti Sor.Jor.Danrayong
- (Thailand) Tengnueng Sitjaesairoong (King's Cup Tournament Champion)
- (Thailand) Por.Tor.Thor. Petchrungruang (Omnoi Stadium Champion, Isuzu Cup Winner)
- (Thailand) Kongklai AnnyMuayThai (Siam Omnoi Stadium Champion)
- (Thailand) Sudsakorn Sor Klinmee (WPMF Champion)
- (Thailand) Saiyok Pumpanmuang (Lumpinee Stadium Champion, Rajadamnern Stadium Champion, WMC Champion)
- (Thailand) Iquezang Kor.Rungthanakeat (Siam Omnoi Stadium Champion)
- (Thailand) Buakaw Banchamek (2× K-1 World MAX Champion, 4× WMC Champion, WBC Muaythai Champion)
- (Thailand) Yodsanklai Fairtex (2× WMC Champion, King's Cup Tournament Champion 2× WPMF Champion, WBC Muaythai Champion, 2× Lumpinee Stadium Champion)
- (Thailand) Kem Sitsongpeenong (WBC Muaythai Champion, WMC Champion, King's Cup Tournament Champion, Rajadamnern Stadium Champion)
- (Thailand) Singmanee Kaewsamrit (WPMF Champion, WMC Champion, Rajadamnern Stadium Champion)
- (France) Antoine Pinto (5× WMC Champion, WPMF Champion, WAKO Champion)
- (Belgium) Youssef Boughanem (WBC Muaythai Champion, Lumpinee Stadium Champion, Rajadamnern Stadium Champion, WAKO Champion, Siam Omnoi Stadium Champion, ISKA Champion)
- (Thailand) Kongsak P.K. Saenchai Muaythaigym (3× Lumpinee Stadium Champion, WMC Champion)
- (Thailand) Pakorn P.K. Saenchai Muaythaigym (Lumpinee Stadium Champion, Rajadamnern Stadium Champion, WMC Champion)
- (Thailand) Satanfah Rachanon (WBC Muaythai Champion)
- (Thailand) Panpayak Jitmuangnon (2× Lumpinee Stadium Champion, 2× Rajadamnern Stadium Champion)
- (China) Han Zihao
- (Belgium) Alka Matewa
- (Spain) Abraham Roqueñi (2× ISKA Champion, 4× WAKO Champion)
- (France) Rafi Bohic (Lumpinee Stadium Champion, WBC Muaythai Champion, WMC Champion)
- (France) Morgan Adrar (2× WBC Muaythai Champion, WMC Champion)
- (France) Samy Sana (WBC Muaythai Champion, ISKA Champion)
- (France) Jimmy Vienot (2× WMC Champion, Lumpinee Stadium Champion, WBC Muaythai Champion, WPMF Champion)
- (United States) Chike Lindsay (WBC Muaythai Champion)
- (France) Fabio Pinca (Rajadamnern Stadium Champion, ISKA Champion, 3× WBC Muaythai Champion)
- (Australia) Franki Giorgi (3× WMC Champion)
- (Thailand) Yodpayak Sitsongpeenong (Lumpinee Stadium Champion, Siam Omnoi Stadium Champion)
- (Ukraine) Sasha Moisa (WLC Lethwei Champion, WMC Champion)
- (Uzbekistan) Anvar Boynazarov
- (Uzbekistan) Naimjon Tuhtaboyev (WLC Lethwei Champion)
- (Belarus) Vitaly Gurkov (WBC Muaythai Champion, K-1 World MAX Champion)
- (Belarus) Andrei Kulebin (7× WMC Champion)
- Tun Tun Min (Golden Belt Lethwei Champion, Myanmar Lethwei Champion)
- (Myanmar) Too Too (WLC Lethwei Champion, Golden Belt Lethwei Champion)
- (Thailand) Armin Pumpanmuang (WBC Muaythai Champion, WPMF Champion)

== Master of Ceremony: MC ==
Present

- Suriyon Aroonwattanakul (2016–Present)
- Premmanat Suwannanon (2016–Present)
- Mr.Phong - Thai commentator (2010–Present)
- Major Dr.Somjit Jongjohor - Thai commentator (2010–Present)
- Arran Sirisompan - English commentator (2015–Present)
- Kevin Aamlid - English commentator 2021–present)
- Thanasut Vudthivichai (Fighter introduction voice) (2010–Present)

Former

- Matthew Deane - Host (2010 - 2015)
- Kathsepsawad Palakawong Na Ayyuttaya - Host (2010 - 2013)
- Nok Tanee (2011 - 2012)
- Robert Cox-English commentator (2011–2014)
- Adam Martin - English commentator (2015–2021)
- Samart Payakaroon - Thai commentator
- Somluck Kamsing - Thai commentator

== See also ==
- Super Champ Muay Thai
- Muay Hardcore
- Glory
- Kunlun Fight
- Wu Lin Feng
- Lumpinee Stadium
- Rajadamnern Stadium
