= Coloration =

Coloration or colouration may refer to:

- Color, the visual perceptual property corresponding in humans to the categories called red, green, blue and others, along with any variation, quality, or property thereof
- Animal coloration, topic of research regarding animals' adaptive appearance
- Cryptic coloration or camouflage, making animals or objects hard to see or disguising them
- Color gradient, a range of position-dependent colors
- Coloration effect, one of the phenomenal effects of watercolor illusions
- Vowel coloration, an account for historical changes in vowel sounds according to Laryngeal theory

== In music ==
- Color (medieval music), four distinct senses in medieval music theory:
  - Color (or colour), a repeating sequence of pitches found in Isorhythmic compositions of the 13th and 14th centuries
  - Coloration, a way of showing 3:2 rhythms in Mensural_notation#Proportions_and_colorations from the early 14c
  - More rarely 14/15c writers use color to describe the chromatic genus or the intervals produced by musica ficta; see chromaticism
  - Coloration or coloratura, ornamentation with many fast 'black' notes, the primary use of term from the 16c on
- Colorist (music), descriptive term for German 16c keyboard composers renowned for use of coloratura or diminution
- Key coloration, characteristics of different keys in unequal tuning systems
- A Colour Symphony, Op. 24 (1922), composition by Arthur Bliss
- Chromesthesia, a synesthetic association of sounds and colors
- Chromaticism, the extension of harmony beyond the diatonic system, usually in the context of the end of the common practice period
- Colouration, tendency of various parts of a loudspeaker to carry on moving when the signal ceases

== See also ==
- Color (disambiguation)
- Gradation (disambiguation)
- Color (law), semblance or implication of a right or authority
