= Gradient (disambiguation) =

Gradient in vector calculus is a vector field representing the maximum rate of increase of a scalar field or a multivariate function and the direction of this maximal rate.

Gradient may also refer to:

- Gradient sro, a Czech aircraft manufacturer
- Image gradient, a gradual change or blending of color
  - Color gradient, a range of position-dependent colors, usually used to fill a region
  - Texture gradient, the distortion in size which closer objects have compared to objects further away
- Spatial gradient, a gradient whose components are spatial derivatives
- Grade (slope), the inclination of a road or other geographic feature
- Slope, a number that describes both the direction and the steepness of a line

== See also ==
- Fade (disambiguation)
- Gradation (disambiguation)
- Grade (disambiguation)
- Rate of change (disambiguation)
- Transition (disambiguation)
