= Jacob Paix =

German composer

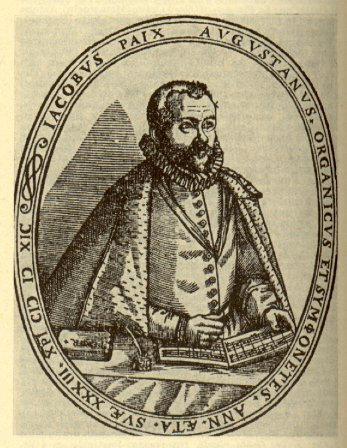
- Born: c. 1556; Augsburg, Germany
- Died: c. 1623 (uncertain); Hilpoltstein, Germany
- Occupation(s): Composer, Organist, Organ Builder

Jacob Paix (c. 1556-after 1623) was a German composer and organist. He was appointed as organist of the parish church in Lauingen in 1576.

== Life ==
Paix was born in 1556 in Augsburg. His father, from whom he received musical education, was employed at St. Anne's Church. In 1576, he was appointed as organist of the church in Lauingen, a position he kept until 1609. His relationship with Kaspar Sturm, organ builder at Ulm Minster, suggests that he was an organ builder himself.

In 1601, Paix was offered a better position as organist at the Protestant court at Neuburg an der Donau. He was responsible for music directed in the instrumental chapel of the palatinate, and he also held chancellorial duties there. In 1613, Count Palatine Wolfgang Wilhelm decided to turn Catholic for political reasons, which caused Paix to leave Neuburg due to no longer suiting the duke's Catholic musical taste. He died in 1623, probably in Hilpoltstein.

== Works ==
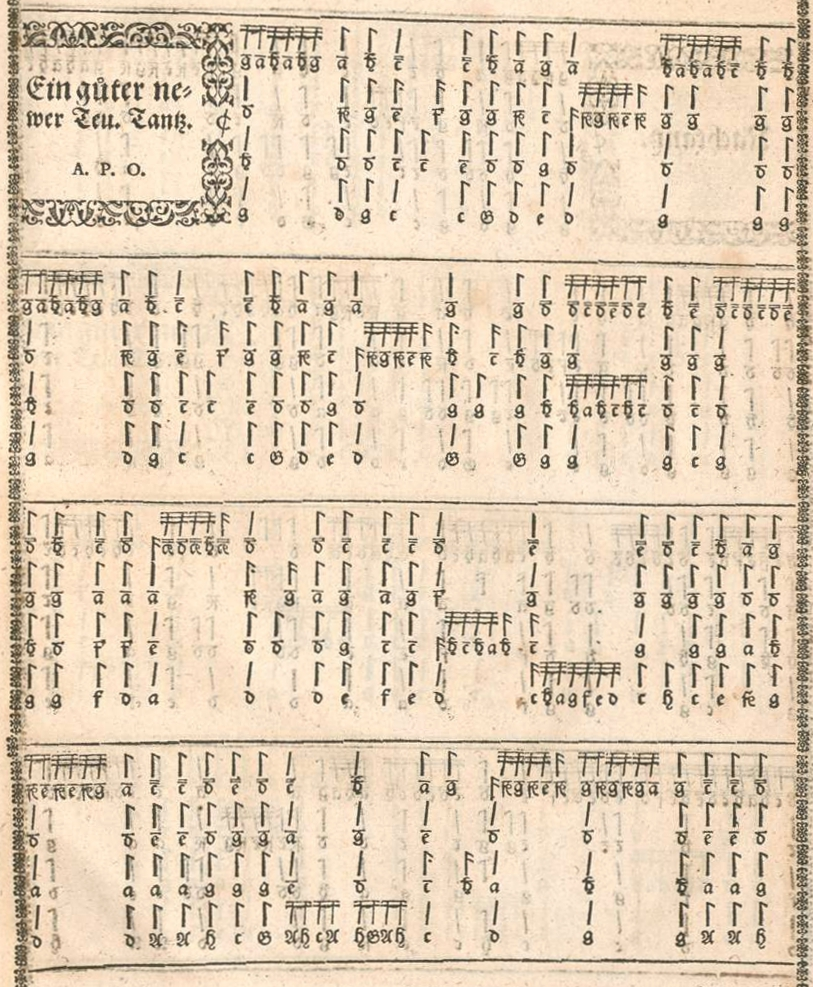
Tablature from Ein gůter newer Teu Tantz, c. 1583.

Jacob Paix is considered a part of the Colorists, a German school of composers that were known for their heavy use of coloraturas and other ornamental figures. He was more known as a collector of foreign, unpublished music, which he published in two organ tablature books in 1583 and 1589. The first book, Ein schön nutz und gebreüchlich Orgel Tabulaturbuch, is applauded as a valuable source of keyboard music in his era. Aside from keyboard music, some of his vocal compositions still exist.
