= Grad =

Grad or grads may refer to:

== Places ==
- Grad (toponymy) (Cyrillic: Град) is a Slavic word meaning "town", "city", "castle" or "fortified settlement" that appears in numerous Slavic toponyms

Specific places named Grad

- Grad (Dubrovnik) - colloquial name for Grad (Ragusa) and present-day Dubrovnik by its inhabitants, neighboring and hinterlands population.
- Grad, Visoko, Bosnia and Herzegovina
- Grad, Delčevo, North Macedonia
- Grąd, Podlaskie Voivodeship, Poland
- Grąd, West Pomeranian Voivodeship, Poland
- Grad, Cerklje na Gorenjskem, Slovenia
- Municipality of Grad, Slovenia
  - Grad, Grad, a village, the seat of the municipality
- Grad, Split, an administrative division of Split, Croatia

== People ==
- Grad (surname)

== Arts, entertainment, and media ==
- Grad (EP), a Cactus Jack EP
- Grad, the dragon in Ral Grad

== Education ==
- Grad, short for a graduate, one who has successfully completed an education program

== Geometry and measurement ==
- Gradian, a unit of angular measurement
- Gradient of a scalar field, a differential operator in mathematics
- Grad, a small unit in tuning very close to the schisma, which it is also called
- abbreviation of gigaradian (Grad), a unit of angle
- abbreviation of gigarad (Grad), a unit of radiation dose

== Other uses ==
- BM-21 Grad, a Soviet multiple-launch rocket system and an associated series of 122 mm (4.80 in) artillery rockets
- Grad Associates, an architectural firm based in Newark, New Jersey
- GrADS, a free software for geophysical data visualization

== See also ==
- Grade (disambiguation)
- Degree (disambiguation)
