= DEG =

DEG or deg may refer to:

== Businesses and organizations ==
- DEG Metro Stars, an ice hockey team in Düsseldorf, Germany
- De Laurentiis Entertainment Group, an entertainment production and distribution company
- Delhaize Group (NYSE stock symbol), a Belgium-based food retailer
- German Investment Corporation (Deutsche Investitions- und Entwicklungsgesellschaft), a German finance company

== In mathematics, science, and technology ==
- Degree (angle), a measurement of plane angle
- Degree (graph theory), the number of edges incident to a vertex
- Degree (temperature), unit in several temperature scales
- Degree of curvature, a measure of curvature used in civil engineering
- Degree of a polynomial, or order, the highest degree (sum of exponents of the variables) among the terms of a polynomial expression
- Diethylene glycol, an organic compound
- Dielectric elastomer generator, in materials science
- Differentially expressed gene, in life sciences

== Other uses ==
- DEG, postnominals for a Dame of the Order of the Eagle of Georgia
- Dég, a village in Hungary
- Deg language
- Deg Hit'an, an indigenous group in Alaska
  - Deg Hit'an language
- Dir En Grey
- Dora's Explorer Girls
- Degree (disambiguation)
