= Pula Arena =

Ancient Roman amphitheater in Pula, Croatia

Amphitheatre in Pula
- Amfiteatar u Puli (Croatian); Anfiteatro di Pola (Italian)
- Pula Arena
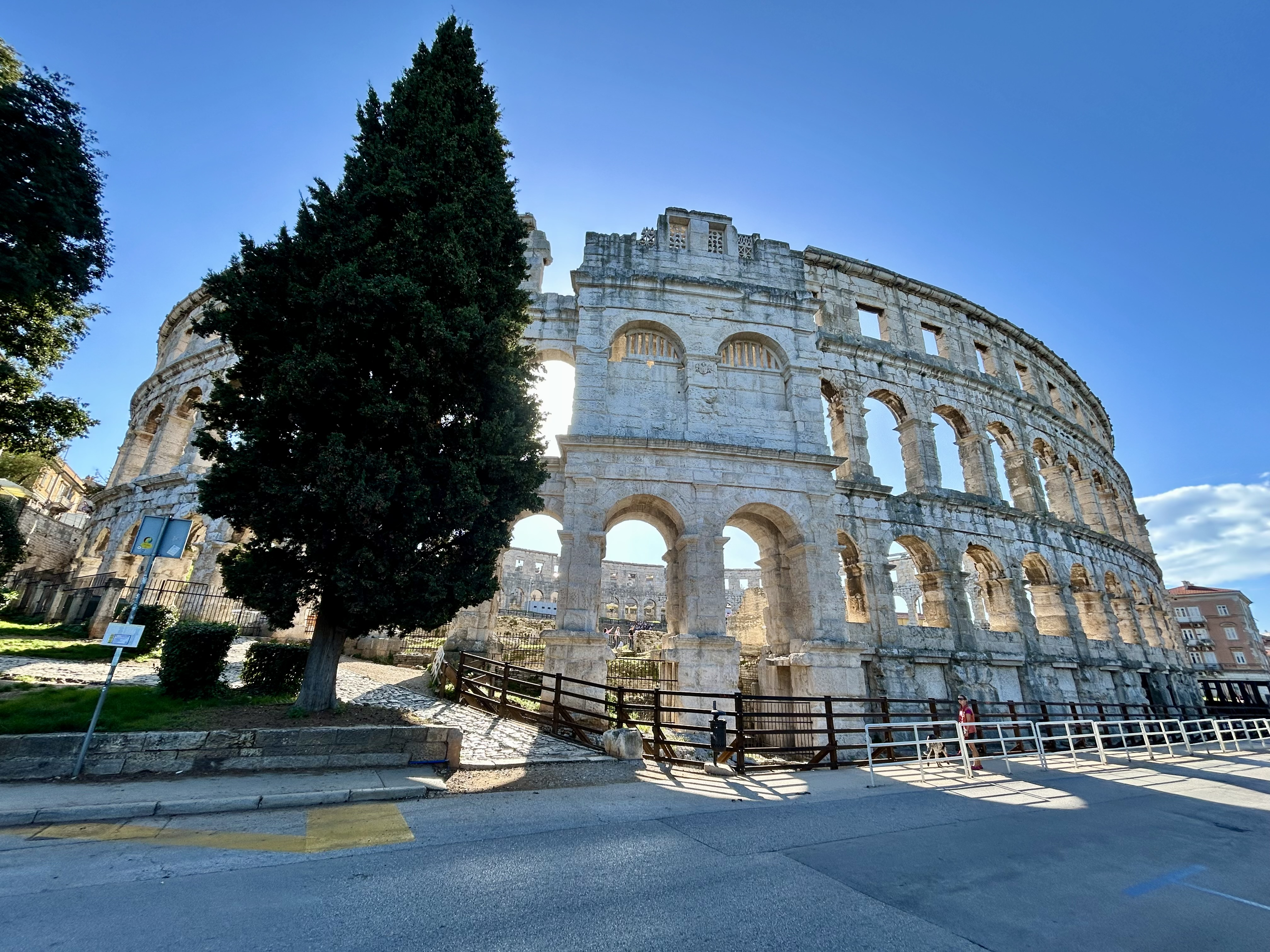
- Western side view, retains its complete circuit of walls.

- Location within Croatia
- 44.873°N 13.850°E
- Type: Roman amphitheatre
- Periods: Roman Empire
- Location: Pula, Istria County, Croatia
- Region: Istria

History
- Built: 27 BC – AD 68

Site notes
- Material: Limestone
- Height: 32.45 m (106.5 ft)
- Length: 132.5 m (435 ft)
- Width: 105.1 m (345 ft)
- Area: 11,466 m^{2} (123,420 sq ft)

Cultural Good of Croatia
- Type: Protected cultural good of national significance
- Reference no.: Z-863

The Amphitheatre in Pula (Croatian: Amfiteatar u Puli; Italian: Anfiteatro di Pola), better known as the Pula Arena (Croatian: Pulska Arena; Italian: Arena di Pola), is a Roman amphitheatre located in Pula, Istria, Croatia. Constructed between 27 BC and AD 14, during the reign of Augustus and later expanded under Vespasian, the arena is one of the best-preserved ancient Roman amphitheatres in the world and the only remaining example to retain its entire circular wall structure. Originally built outside the city walls, the arena once accommodated up to 23,000 spectators and served as the main venue for gladiatorial contests, animal hunts, and other forms of public entertainment typical of the Roman Empire.

The structure is built from local limestone and measures approximately 132 by 105 metres, with a height of 32 metres at its highest point. It features a complex system of subterranean passages, gates, and towers that were once used to manage performers, animals, and stage machinery. The arena’s architectural design reflects a blend of Roman engineering precision and adaptation to the Adriatic coastal landscape, offering panoramic views over Pula’s harbour.

After the fall of the Western Roman Empire, the amphitheatre gradually lost its original function and was used for various purposes, including as a fortress, quarry, and pasture ground. Systematic preservation efforts began in the 19th century, when the arena became recognized as a cultural monument of exceptional historical value. Today, it stands as one of Croatia’s most iconic landmarks and a symbol of Pula’s ancient heritage.

In modern times, the Pula Arena has been transformed into a cultural venue, hosting numerous events such as the Pula Film Festival, concerts, opera performances, and theatrical productions. The amphitheatre was depicted on the reverse of the Croatian 10 kuna banknote, issued in 1993, 1995, 2001 and 2004.

== History ==
=== Construction ===
The amphitheater is located 200 meters northeast of the city walls of Pula, in accordance with the Roman land division network. The Arena was built between 27 BC and 68 AD, as the city of Pula became a regional centre of Roman rule, called Pietas Julia. It is believed that construction began during the reign of Emperor Augustus and was funded by the central state treasury of the Roman Empire. It was replaced by a small stone amphitheatre during the reign of Emperor Claudius. In 79 AD it was enlarged to accommodate gladiator fights by Vespasian and to be completed in 81 AD under Emperor Titus. This was confirmed by the discovery of a Vespasian coin in the malting. The building is named after the sand (Latin harena) that once covered the inner performance area. It was built outside the town walls along the Via Flavia, the road from Pula to Aquileia and Rome. The two main axes of the outer wall structure measure 132.5 meters and 105.1 meters, with the maximum height reaching 32.45 meters. The amphitheater was built in the Tuscan style and occupies an area of 11,466 m². It is estimated that it could accommodate approximately 23,000 spectators.

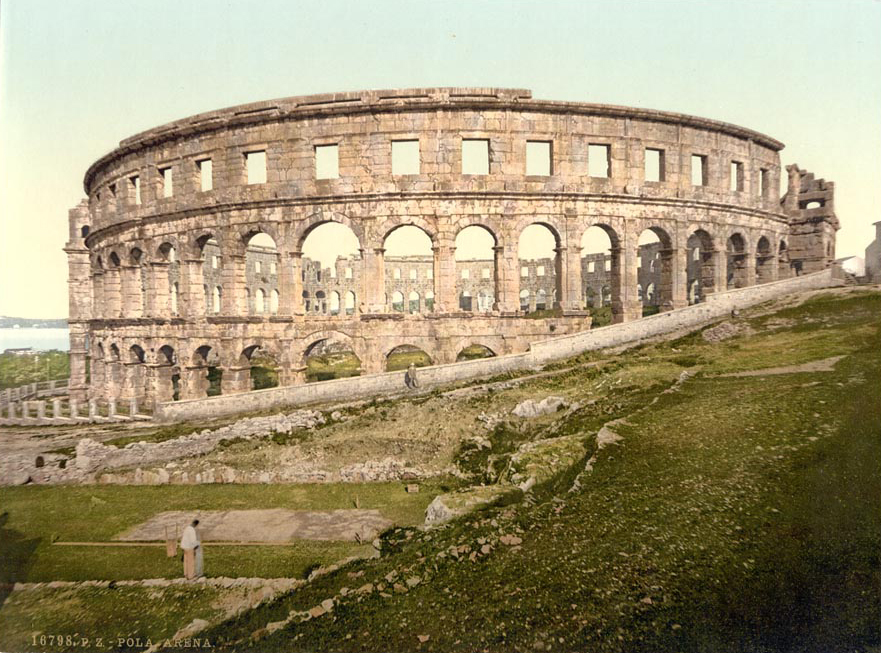
Amphitheater in 19th century, during Austria-Hungary

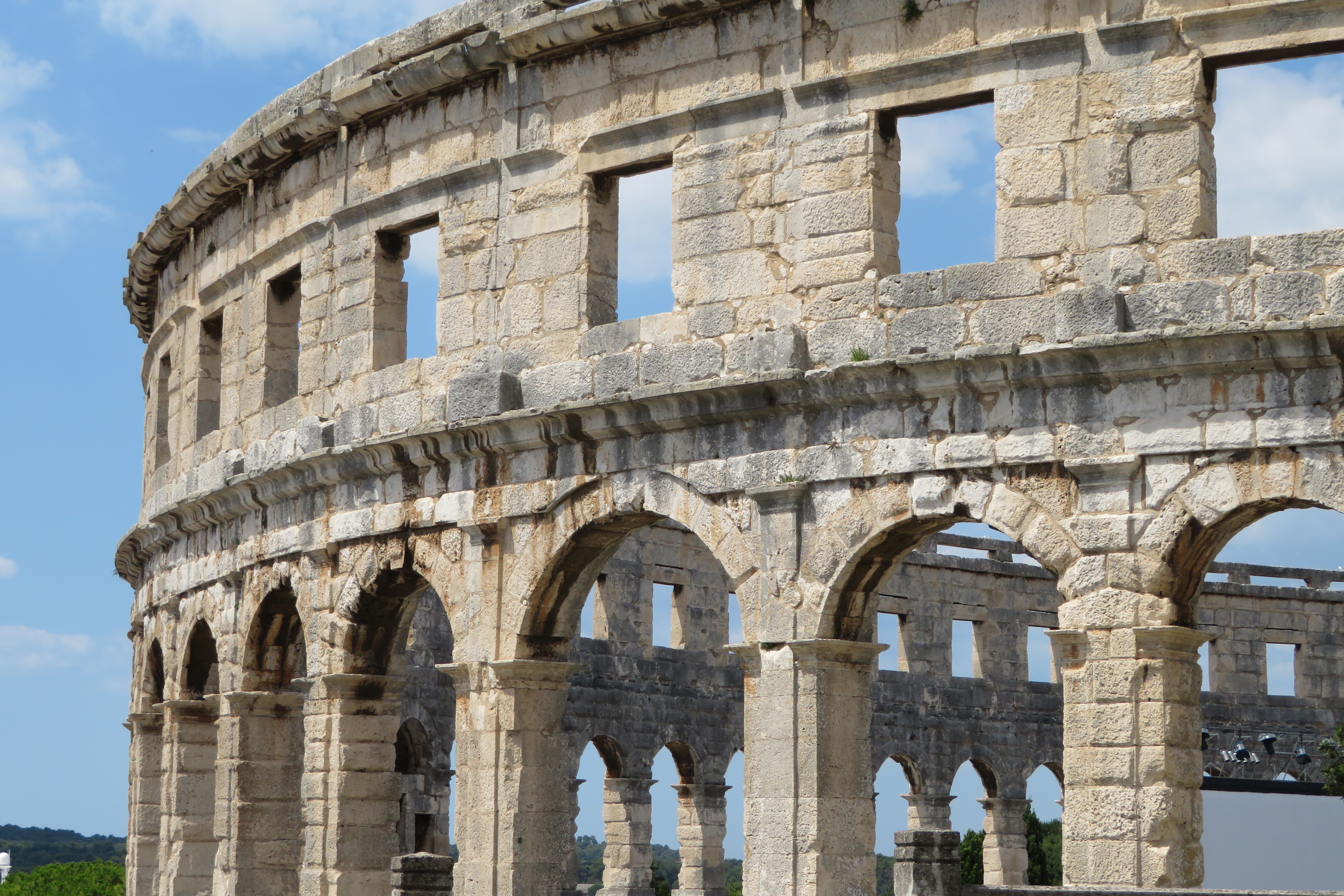
wall exterior details

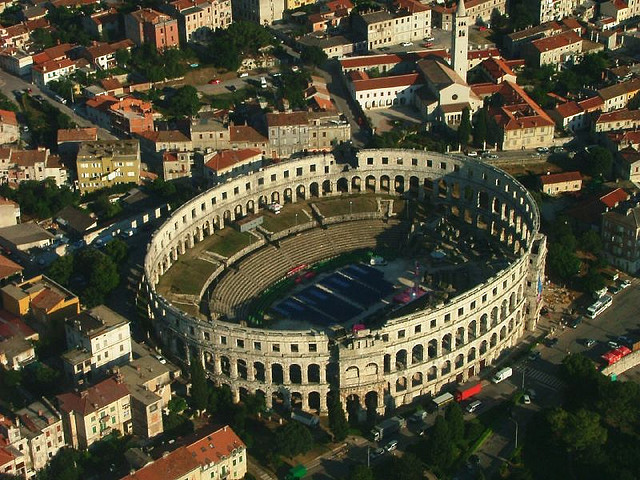
Aerial view, 2008

Built on the slope of a hill on the western side, facing the sea, the Pula amphitheater has four levels—an elevated foundation with entrances and three stories. On the eastern side, where the ground is naturally elevated, the walled portion of the structure is significantly smaller, with only the two upper stories rising above the ground. The outer wall of the amphitheater features arches 4 meters wide along the main axis, larger than the others, highlighting the main entrances (portae pompae). The entrance at the southern end was the most important, as it faced the city. This side also contained the main entrance to the arena. The second level of the seating was built around the entire perimeter of the amphitheater, consisting of 72 semicircular arcades. The third level belonged to a gallery in an oval, ring-like shape, covered by a slanted roof made of ceramic tiles and cup-shaped structures. Unlike the lower levels, the upper gallery was open to the outside, with 64 square windows.

The cornice at the top of the second level supported platforms for inserting wooden masts, which towered over the amphitheater. The risk of soil erosion and slippage due to rain was minimized through the construction of a drainage system for rainwater.

The arena, located in the center of the amphitheater, measures 67.9 meters along its longer axis and 41.6 meters along its shorter axis. The oval shape of the arena was ideal for processions, formations, military strategy, and the movement of armed groups. Beneath the arena was an auxiliary underground room, mostly carved into the living rock and partially built up to the required height. This space was used for holding cages for wild animals and various technical equipment for preparing the Gladiator games.

In case of bad weather, the seating area was covered with cloth, using a system of pulleys and ropes. Wooden masts, which held the cloth, passed through designated openings in the stone cornice. On the opposite end, above the edges of the arena, was a metal ring supported by vertical masts. Ropes stretched between the outer masts and the inner metal ring held the fabric in place.

In legend, Saint Germanus, of whom little is known, was tortured in the Amphitheatre in or around 290, and subsequently martyred outside the city, on the road to Nesactium. The amphitheatre remained in use until the 5th century, when Emperor Honorius prohibited gladiatorial combats. It was not until 681 that combat between convicts, particularly those sentenced to death, and wild animals was forbidden. In the 5th century the amphitheatre began to see its stone plundered by the local populace. By the 13th century, the patriarch of Aquileia forbade further removal from the arena.

=== Details ===
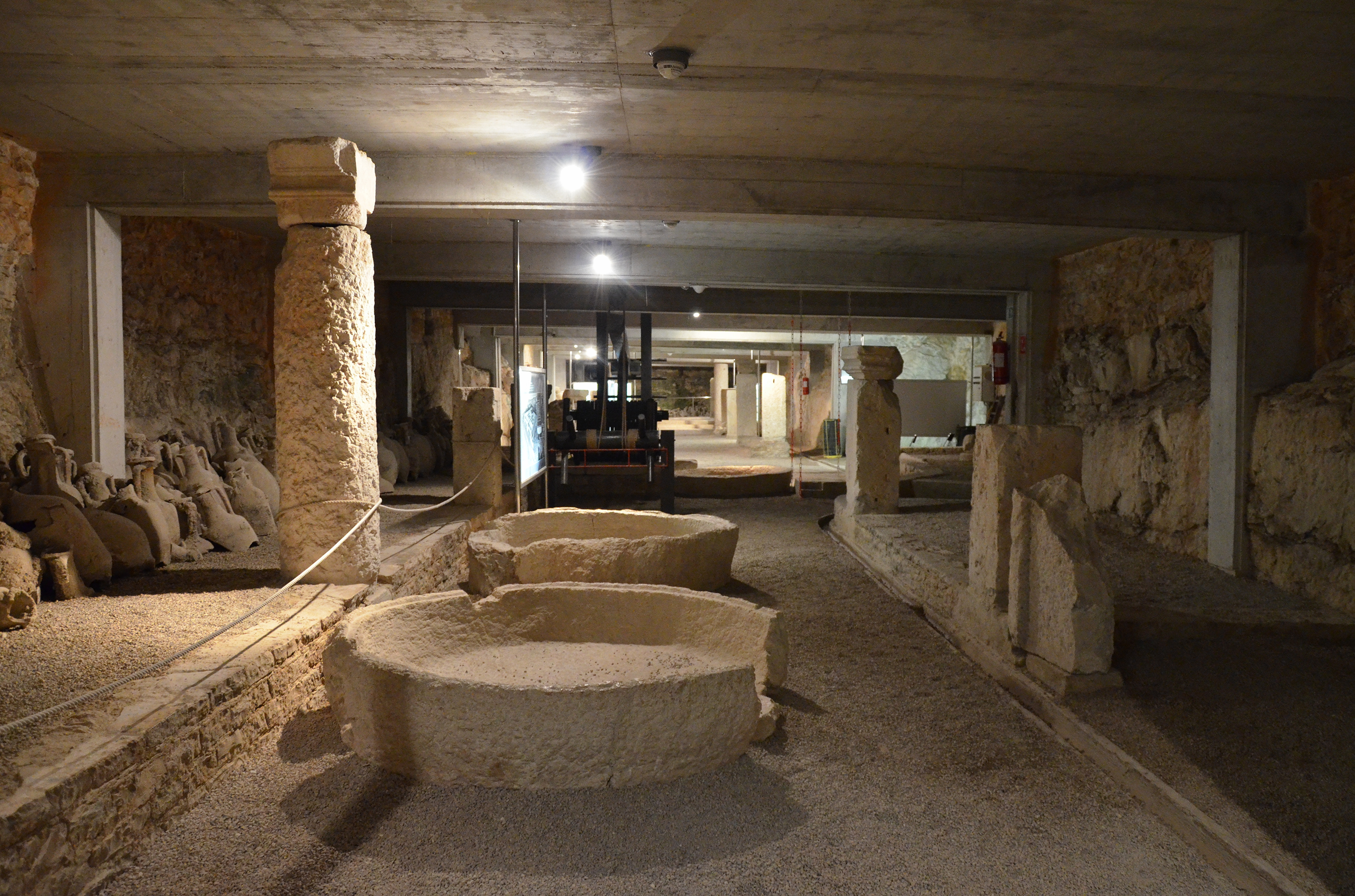
Exhibition of viticulture and olive growing in underground passages

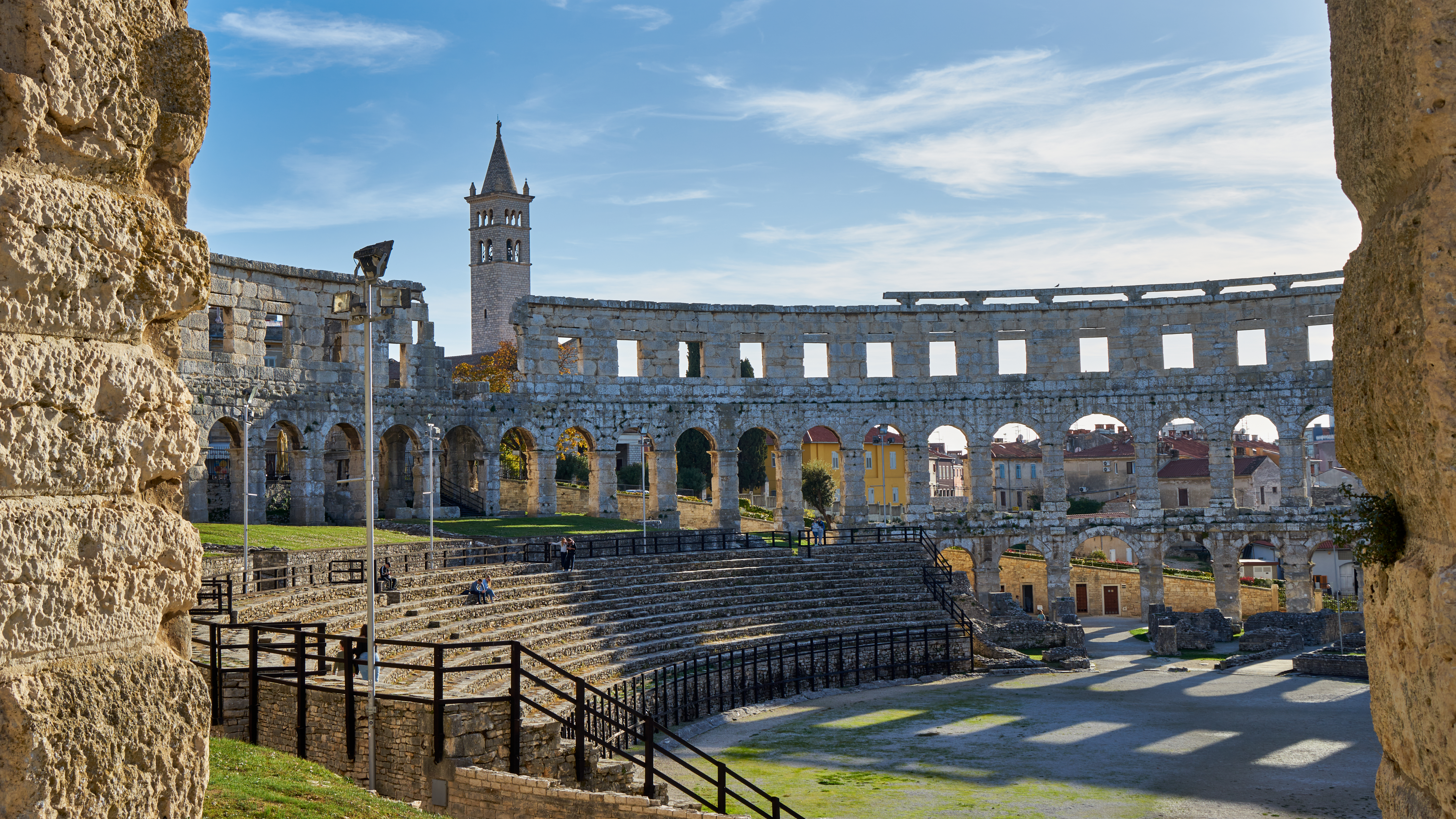
Interior and cavea

The exterior wall is constructed in limestone. The part facing the sea consists of three stories, while the other part has only two stories since the amphitheatre was built on a slope. The maximum height of the exterior wall is 29.40 m (96.5 ft). The first two floors have each 72 arches, while the top floor consists of 64 rectangular openings.

The axes of the elliptical amphitheatre are 132.45 and 105.10 m (434.5 and 344.8 ft) long, and the walls stand 32.45 m (106.5 ft) high. It could accommodate 23,000 spectators in the cavea, which had forty steps divided into two meniani. The seats rest directly on the sloping ground; The field for the games, the proper arena, measured 67.95 by 41.65 m (222.9 by 136.6 ft). The field was separated from the public by iron gates.

The arena had a total of 15 gates. A series of underground passageways were built underneath the arena along the main axis from which animals, ludi scenes and fighters could be released; stores and shops were located under the raked seating. The amphitheatre was part of the circuit of the gladiators.

Each of the four towers had two cisterns filled with perfumed water that fed a fountain or could be sprinkled on the spectators. The amphitheatre could be covered with velaria (large sails), protecting the spectators from sun or rain (as attested by rare construction elements). Below the arena was a system of canals which collected rainwater and effluent and drained into the sea.

This amphitheatre, through its conservation, has served as an example for the study of ancient building techniques.

=== Later use ===
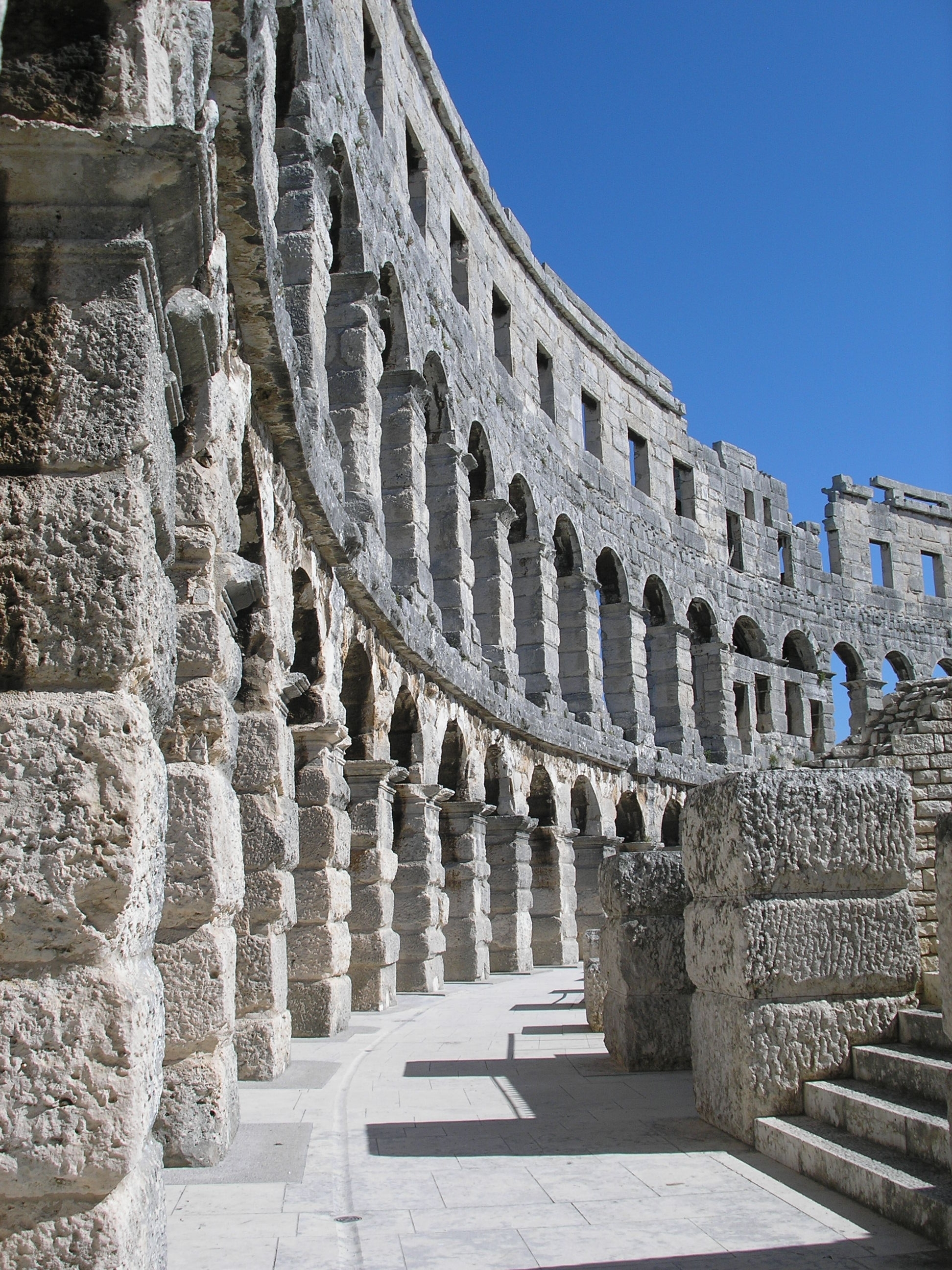
Restored arched walls at Pula

In the Middle Ages the interior of the Arena was often used for grazing, occasional tournaments by the Knights of Malta and medieval fairs. In 1583 the Venetian Senate proposed dismantling the arena and rebuilding it within Venice. The proposals were rejected. Today, a headstone celebrating the Venetian senator Gabriele Emo's opposition to the plan is currently visible on the second tower.

In 1789, stone was taken from Pula arena for the belfry foundations at Pula Cathedral. This was the last time the arena was used as a source of stone.

=== Restoration ===
General Auguste de Marmont, as governor of the Illyrian Provinces during the First French Empire, started the restoration of the arena. This was continued in 1816 by the Ticinese architect Pietro Nobile, commissioned by the Emperor Francis I of Austria.

In 1932, the arena was adapted for theatre productions, military ceremonies and public meetings. In its present state, seating capacity is around 7,000 and 12,500 for all standing events.

== Present day ==
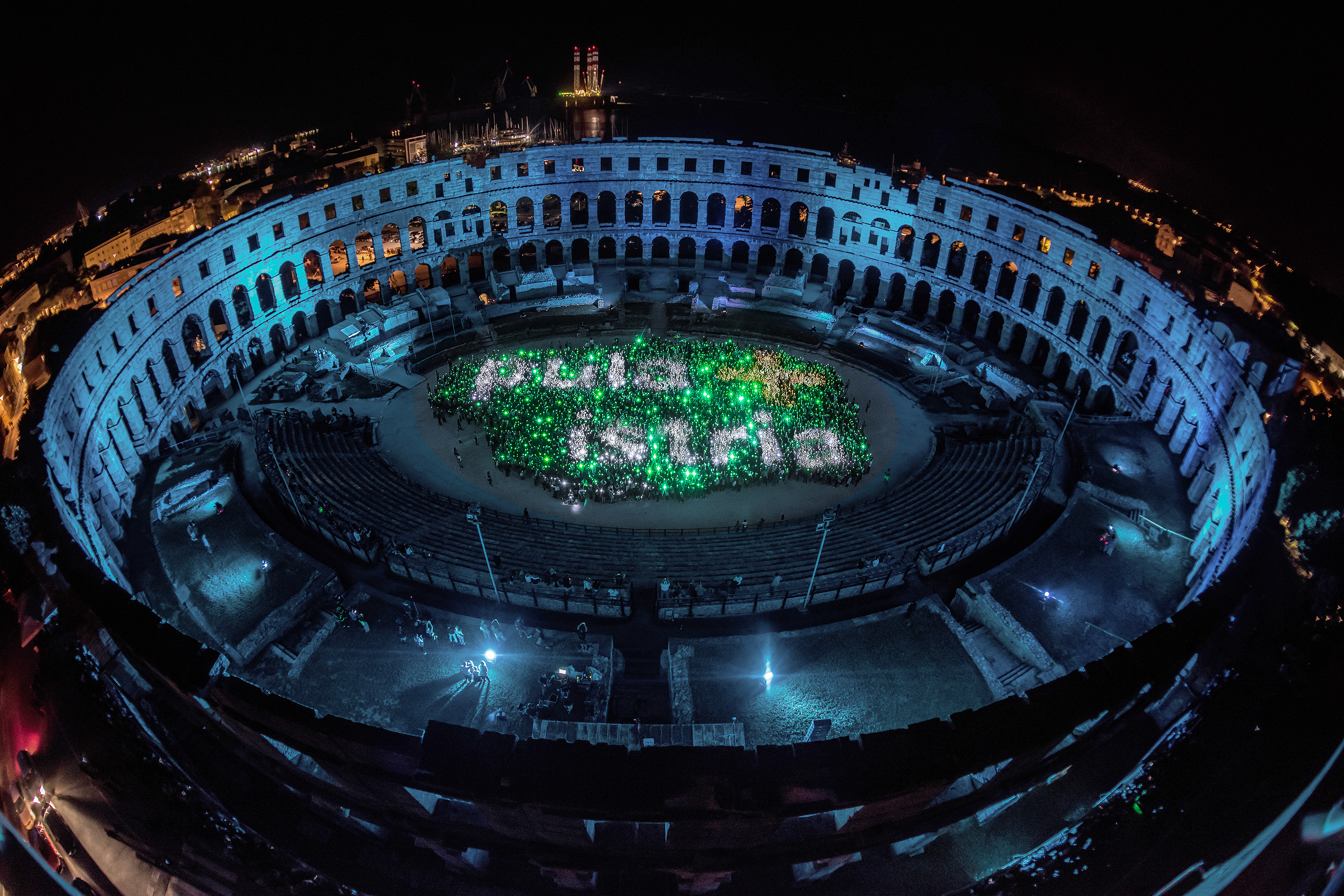
Arena Pula broke the Guinness World Record in the "Largest Human Light Sign" category

The arena is used as a venue for many concerts. Performances have included ones by Duran Duran, Foo Fighters, Luciano Pavarotti, Đorđe Balašević, Plácido Domingo, Andrea Bocelli, Nina Badrić, Hillsong United, Patrizio Buanne, Jose Carreras, Dino Merlin, Jamiroquai, Anastacia, Eros Ramazzotti, Maksim Mrvica, Norah Jones, Zucchero, Zdravko Čolić, Alanis Morissette, Sinéad O'Connor, Elton John, Bryan Adams, Robbie Williams, 2Cellos, Sting, Michael Bolton, Seal, Il Divo, Tom Jones, Gibonni, Manu Chao, Oliver Dragojević, Leonard Cohen, Grace Jones, Moderat, David Gilmour, Avril Lavigne, and the Arctic Monkeys. It has a capacity of about 5000 spectators, and also hosts operas, ballets, sports competitions as well as the Pula Film Festival. The arena is open to the public daily, and the underground passages house exhibitions of viticulture and olive growing in Istria.

The arena has also been used for cinematic works such as Titus, a 1999 film adaptation of Shakespeare's revenge tragedy Titus Andronicus by Julie Taymor. On 8 July 2019, a football match was played between the former players of FC Bayern Munich and the Croatia national football team as part of a tourism partnership deal between FC Bayern Munich and the Istria Tourist Board signed in 2018. Two professional ice hockey games were played there on September 14 and 16, 2012; KHL Medveščak, a Zagreb-based Erste Bank Eishockey Liga club, hosted HDD Olimpija Ljubljana and the Vienna Capitals.

== Panorama ==
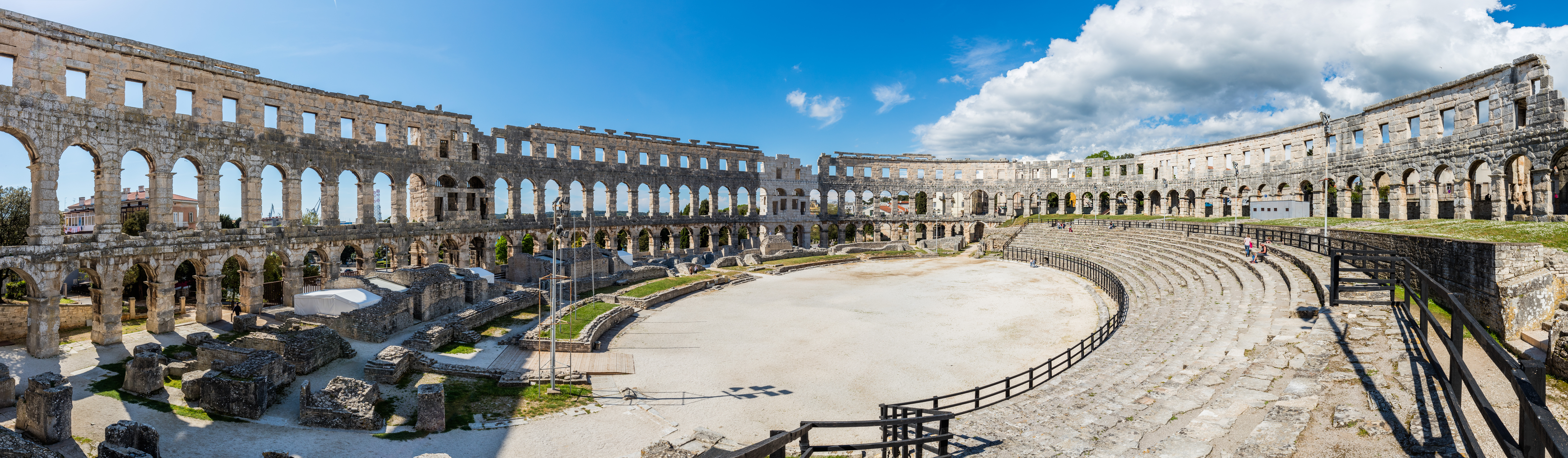
Interior of Pula arena

== Concerts ==
List of events, concerts or any other public gathering on Pula Arena.

Date	Performer	Concert or Tour
4 August 1990	Einstürzende Neubauten	Dance of the Rainbow Serpent Tour
13 Jul 1997	Sting	Mercury Falling Tour
20 June 1997	Ricky Martin	Vuelve World Tour
16 July 1998	James Brown	Concert
12 July 2000	Alanis Morissette	Concert
4 July 2000	Joe Cocker	Concert
25 August 2001	Oliver Dragojević	Concert
2 August 2002	Zucchero	Concert
8 July 2003	Simply Red & Massimo Savić	Home Tour
16 August 2005	Joe Cocker	Heart and Soul Tour
25 August 2007	Oliver Dragojević & Gibonni	Concert
24 June 2009	Sinéad O'Connor	Concert
13 August 2010	Solomon Burke	Concert
18 August 2011	Apocalyptica	Arena Fest
26 July 2011	Jack Johnson & Jimmy Cliff	Concert
31 August 2013	Grace Jones	Concert
2 August 2013	Leonard Cohen	Concert
3 July 2013	2CELLOS	Concert
3 September 2014	Lauryn Hill	Outlook Festival
6 March 2014	Status Quo	Frantic Four Reunion Tour
26 August 2015	Little Dragon	Dimensions Festival
9 August 2016	Nina Badrić	Concert
4 September 2016	Calibre	Concert
31 August 2016	Damian "Jr. Gong" Marley	Concert
24 August 2016	Massive Attack	Concert
30 July 2016	Robert Plant	Concert
30 August 2017	Moses Boyd	Concert
13 August 2017	Zucchero	Black Cat World Tour
4 August 2017	Tomislav Bralić & Klapa Intrade	Concert
28 July 2017	Dino Merlin	Hotel Nacional
11 August 2018	Bajaga i instruktori	U sali lom
3 August 2018	Amira Medunjanin	Concert
29 August 2018	Kraftwerk	Dimensions Festival
28 August 2019	Anderson .Paak	Best Teef In The Game Tour
17 August 2019	Đorđe Balašević	Concert
10 August 2019	Saša 21	Concert
19 June 2019	Foo Fighters & Frank Carter and the Rattlesnakes	Concert
8 October 2022	Psihomodo Pop	Concert
17 August 2022	Mattiel	Concert
7 August 2022	Bajaga i instruktori	Adria Summer Festival
6 August 2022	Tony Cetinski	Adria Summer Festival
5 July 2022	Charlotte de Witte	Concert
25 June 2022	Parni valjak	Parni Valjak i prijatelji - Dovoljno je reći... Aki!
25 August 2023	Zdravko Čolić	Concert
28 June 2023	Lufthaus	Concert
27 June 2023	Robbie Williams	XXV
21 June 2023	Donna Marina Mårtensson	Concert
18 June 2023	Florence + the Machine	Florence + The Machine Dance Fever Tour
3 June 2023	Hillsong United	Are We There Yet Tour
28 July 2024	Devon Ross	Concert
3 July 2024	Grad	Concert
17 June 2024	Avril Lavigne & Kraj Programa	Greatest Hits Tour
15 June 2024	Smile	Concert
30 August 2025	Tony Cetinski	Concert
15 August 2025	Parni valjak	Concert
9 August 2025	Plavi Orkestar	Adria Summer Festival
8 August 2025	Grace Jones	Adria Summer Festival
29 July 2025	Bryan Adams	Roll With The Punches Tour
25 July 2025	Prljavo kazalište	Stare navike
28 June 2025	Jean-Michel Jarre	Concert
24 June 2025	Tom Jones	Concert
23 June 2025	Tom Jones	Concert
21 June 2025	Gibonni	Concert
3 September 2026	Hollywood Vampires	Concert
1 August 2026	Sting	Sting 3.0
25 August 2026	Judas Priest	Faithkeepers Tour
23 August 2026	Tom Odell	Concert
18 August 2026	Lorde & Smerz	Concert
4 and 5 August 2026	Nick Cave and The Bad Seeds	Concert
31 July 2026	Black Coffee	Concert

== See also ==
- Pula Film Festival
- List of Roman sites
