= Tengnueng Sitjaesairoong =

Thai Muay Thai fighter

- Born: Ekkapan Somboonsab; October 6, 1992 (age 34); Nakhon Sawan, Thailand
- Other names: Super-X Por. Petchnamchai
- Nationality: Thai
- Height: 180 cm (5 ft 11 in)
- Weight: 77 kg (170 lb; 12 st)
- Division: Cruiserweight; Light heavyweight Super middleweight Middleweight; Light middleweight
- Style: Muay Thai
- Stance: Southpaw
- Fighting out of: Bangkok, Thailand
- Team: Fairtex Training Center Pattaya; Dejrat Muay Thai Academy

Kickboxing record
- Total: 124
- Wins: 104
- Losses: 15
- Draws: 4
- No contests: 1

Tengnueng Sitjaesairoong (Thai: เต็งหนึ่ง ศิษย์เจ๊สายรุ้ง; born October 6, 1992), formerly known as Super-X Por. Petchnamchai, is a Thai Muay Thai fighter from the Nakhon Sawan Province of Central Thailand. He is a 2014 King's Cup Super 8 Tournament winner.

Tengnueng is known for his tendency of knocking out opponents early in his fights, usually within the first round.

He has achieved fame on Thai Fight. Fighting in a larger weight class than most Thai fighters, Tengnueng has become a fan favorite in the promotion and is a main event staple. He is a 2015 Thai Fight 70kg Tournament Champion, 2020 Thai Fight Kard Chuek 72.5 kg Tournament Champion, and 2023 Thai Fight Kard Chuek 72.5 kg Tournament Champion.

As of November 2021, Tengnueng is ranked the No. 6 light heavyweight by WBC Muaythai.

== Early years ==
Tengnueng Sitjaesairoong was born Ekkapan Somboonsab on October 6, 1992, in Nakhon Sawan, Thailand.

He started practicing Muay Thai at the age of 6, receiving training from his father, a former Muay Thai fighter. In his early days, he would partake in 3-round fights.

== Muay Thai career ==
Tengnueng first joined the Meenayothin Gym but later moved to the Rachanon Gym to kickstart his Muay Thai career. He began fighting under the ring name of Super-X Por. Petchnamchai.

Early on, his professional career got off to a rough start as he lost the majority of his fights, all by decision. During this time, he usually fought at the Siam Omnoi Stadium and the prestigious Rajadamnern Stadium.

On September 19, 2012, Tengnueng made his first appearance on Thai Fight, facing Abdallah Mabel at THAI FIGHT Extreme 2012: France. However, he wound up losing by 2nd-round TKO.

After a falling out with the head of the Rachanon Gym, he took some time away from Muay Thai. Tengnueng later returned and resumed training with the Dejrat Muay Thai Academy in 2014, with whom he has been training ever since, and began fighting under his current ring name of Tengnueng Sitjaesairoong.

His style of Muay Thai is regarded as 'Muay Mat', emphasizing powerful punches, particularly his left hand.

=== 2014 ===
In his comeback, Tengnueng Sitjaesairoong went on to participate in the 2014 Omnoi Stadium Weber 154 lbs Muay Thai Tournament at Omnoi Stadium.

On November 8, 2014, Tengnueng defeated Kompetchlek Lookprabat to become the 2014 Omnoi Stadium Weber 154 lbs Tournament Champion.

On December 5, 2014, Tengnueng participated in the one-night King's Cup challenger tournament. In the tournament semis, he knocked out Sweden's Carl N'Diaye in the 1st round. In the finals, he defeated Ilya Grad of Israel by 1st-round KO to win the 2014 King's Cup.

=== 2015 ===
He made his return to THAI FIGHT on April 4, 2015, where he faced Rungrawee P.K.SaenchaiMuaythaiGym at THAI FIGHT CRMA, where he won by three-round decision.

He then defeated Gaëtan Dambo by decision at THAI FIGHT Samui 2015 on May 2, 2015.

Next, he faced Alex Oller at THAI FIGHT Proud to Be Thai: China in China on July 18, 2015, where he proceeded to deliver a 1st-round knockout, the first of many.

On August 22, 2015, he defeated Alka Matewa of Belgium by unanimous decision at THAI FIGHT Narathiwat.

Tengnueng resumed his habit of finishing opponents and began a long streak of knockout victories as he proceeded to beat Aleksei Dodonov via 2nd-round TKO at THAI FIGHT Proud to Be Thai: Moscow on September 17, 2015.

On October 24, 2015, Tengnueng defeated the Lithuanian Sigitas Gaizauskas by 2nd-round KO at THAI FIGHT Proud to Be Thai: Vietnam.

On November 21, 2015, he claimed a 1st-round KO victory over Florian Breau at THAI FIGHT RPCA.

In the final THAI FIGHT event of 2015, THAI FIGHT Count Down, Tengnueng faced the Brazilian José Neto for the 2015 THAI FIGHT 70 kg Championship on December 31, 2015. After connecting on multiple punching combinations, Tengnueng was able to score a 1st-round KO victory. As a result, he was crowned the 2015 THAI FIGHT 70 kg King's Cup Champion.

=== 2016 ===
Tengnueng started 2016 with a 2nd-round TKO victory over Daniel Kerr of Germany at THAI FIGHT Korat 2016 on March 19, 2016.

On April 30, 2016, he secured a 1st-round KO victory over Brazil's Reinato Gomes at THAI FIGHT Samui 2016.

On July 23, 2016, Tengnueng would brutally dispatch Sok Tauch of Cambodia with a 1st-round TKO victory at THAI FIGHT Proud To Be Thai 2016.

On August 20, 2016, Tengnueng was able to secure 2 KO wins in one night at THAI FIGHT KMITL. He first knocked out Yan Naing Aung of Myanmar in the 1st round. He then proceeded to deliver another 1st-round KO over Sinan Uluturk of Turkey that same evening.

At THAI FIGHT London, on September 11, 2016, he beat Sam Gough by 1st-round TKO with a low kick.

On October 5, 2016, Tengnueng defeated Erik Massion of Germany by 1st-round KO at THAI FIGHT Emei.

He would then go on an uncharacteristic three-fight losing streak, including a decision loss to Hamza Ngoto at THAI FIGHT Paris on April 8, 2017. This marked his first loss in THAI FIGHT since September 19, 2012.

=== 2019 ===
After a period of inactivity for most of 2017 and 2018, in which he fought once each year, Tengnueng later returned to THAI FIGHT in 2019 on February 23, 2019, at THAI FIGHT Phuket 2019. This time, he had noticeably put on weight and fought at a heavier 80 kg (176 lbs), as opposed to his previous fighting weights of 70–75 kg (154-165 lbs). His first opponent of the year was Russia's Mike Vetrila, whom he knocked out in the 1st round, keeping his streak of KO wins alive at 12.

On March 30, 2019, he defeated Evgenii Afanasev at THAI FIGHT Mueang Khon 2019 by 2nd-round KO.

Tengnueng seemed to return to his previous form, despite his weight gain, when he delivered a 1st-round KO of Simon Maait of Australia at THAI FIGHT Samui 2019 on April 27, 2019.

However, this was not to last as his performance was called into question when he faced Mohammad Hossein Doroudian of Iran at THAI FIGHT Betong 2019 on June 29, 2019. After uncharacteristically getting knocked down early in the 1st round, Tengnueng seemed hesitant to engage but was able to inflict his own damage in much of the 2nd round. However, the judges deemed the fight to be even after 3 rounds and declared the match a draw, requiring a 4th round to be fought. Both Tengnueng and Doroudian, obviously gassed, were reluctant to engage but the Thai was declared the winner by extra-round decision. This fight ultimately ended Tengnueng's streak of wins by KO at 14.

On August 24, 2019, Tengnueng defeated Aboofazel Goodarzi by 1st-round KO at THAI FIGHT Kham Chanod 2019.

Tengnueng was eventually booked for a rematch with Mohammad Hossein Doroudian at THAI FIGHT Bangsaen 2019 on October 26, 2019. This time around, Tengnueng captured the 1st-round KO victory with a series of high kicks that gradually wore down Doroudian's arms.

On November 23, 2019, Tengnueng faced Shahram Delavar at THAI FIGHT Mae Sot 2019. While he dominated the entire 3 rounds of the fight, Tengnueng was unable to finish off Delavar and ended up getting the win by decision.

On December 21, 2019, at THAI FIGHT: Thai Fest in Patong, Tengnueng faced perhaps one of his most decorated and experienced opponents in the USA's Cyrus Washington, who experienced success competing in Lethwei in Myanmar. While Washington was older and slower, he was able to avoid getting knocked out by Tengnueng and the fight eventually went the full 3 rounds. Nevertheless, Tengnueng took the decision victory and was awarded a THAI FIGHT Kard Chuek Superfight 81 kg belt.

=== 2020-2021 ===
Tengnueng entered his first THAI FIGHT King's Cup Tournament since 2015, this time contesting for the inaugural THAI FIGHT 72.5 kg Kard Chuek King's Cup Championship. He will face Nicolas Rooney in the tournament semi-finals at THAI FIGHT Strong on July 4, 2021. He defeated Rooney by second-round knockout. Tengnueng is scheduled to rematch Nicolas Mendes in the 72.5 kg Tournament Final, whom he previously fought at THAI FIGHT New Normal the year before.

Due to travel restrictions pertaining to the COVID-19 pandemic, Mendes was later replaced by Thomas Carpenter in the Tournament Final. Tengnueng won the fight by first-round knockout via liver shot to win his second Thai Fight King's Cup title.

== Titles ==
- THAI FIGHT
  - 2023 THAI FIGHT 72.5 kg Kard Chuek King's Cup Champion
  - 2020 THAI FIGHT 72.5 kg Kard Chuek King's Cup Champion
  - 2019 THAI FIGHT Kard Chuek 81 kg Superfight Champion
  - 2015 THAI FIGHT 70 kg King's Cup Champion
  - 2015 Isuzu Cup Superfight 70 kg Champion
  - 30–2 record
- World Muaythai Council (WMC)
  - 2014 WMC King's Cup Challenger Tournament Champion
- Omnoi Stadium
  - 2014 Omnoi Stadium Weber 70 kg Tournament Champion
- La Nuit des Titans
  - 2012 La Nuit des Titans 72 kg Tournament Champion
- International Federation of Muaythai Associations
  - 2016 IFMA World Championships 75 kg (silver)

== Muay Thai record ==
Muay Thai record
104 Wins , 15 Losses , 4 Draws , 1 No Contest
Date	Result	Opponent	Event	Location	Method	Round	Time
2025-10-17	Win	(Myanmar) Tun Min Aung	ONE Friday Fights 129, Lumpinee Stadium	Bangkok, Thailand	Decision (Unanimous)	3	3:00
2025-08-22	Loss	(Russia) Maksim Bakhtin	ONE Friday Fights 121, Lumpinee Stadium	Bangkok, Thailand	KO (Spinning back elbow)	2	0:45
2025-05-16	Win	(France) Germain Kpoghomou	ONE Friday Fights 108, Lumpinee Stadium	Bangkok, Thailand	KO (Left cross)	2	1:08
2025-02-14	NC	(Russia) Dmitry Menshikov	ONE Friday Fights 97, Lumpinee Stadium	Bangkok, Thailand	NC (overturned)	1	2:59
Originally a KO (punches) win for Menshikov; overturned after he tested positive for banned substances.
2024-08-04	Win	(United States) Cameron Church	THAI FIGHT Mueang Khon	Nakhon Si Thammarat, Thailand	TKO	2	
2024-03-24	Win	(Uzbekistan) Babur Urinbaev	Thai Fight: Pluak Daeng 2	Rayong, Thailand	KO	2	
2024-02-25	Win	(Iran) Abolfazl Gholi Zadeh	Thai Fight: Phimai	Nakhon Ratchasima, Thailand	KO	1	
2023-12-24	Win	(Iran) Abolfazl Mehrazaran	Thai Fight: Luang Pu Thuat	Ayutthaya, Thailand	KO	1	
2023-11-26	Win	(Iran) Arvin Mehboudi	Thai Fight: Bang Kachao	Samut Prakan province, Thailand	KO	1	
2023-10-29	Win	(Iran) Abolfazl Mehrazaran	THAI FIGHT Setthi Ruea Thong	Lopburi, Thailand	Decision	3	3:00
2023-05-21	Win	(Uzbekistan) Shokhruz Ortikov	THAI FIGHT 100 Years Rajabhat Korat	Nakhon Ratchasima, Thailand	KO	1	
2023-04-22	Win	(Italy) Gianluca Costa Cesari	THAI FIGHT Rome	Rome, Italy	TKO (Corner stoppage)	2	
2023-02-04	Win	(United Kingdom) Corey beldon	THAI FIGHT Luang Phor Ruay	Saraburi province, Thailand	TKO (Referee stoppage)	1	
2022-12-24	Win	(Brazil) Emerson Bento	Thai Fight: Metropolitan Police Bureau 100th Anniversary	Bangkok, Thailand	KO (Punches)	1	
2022-11-20	Win	(Israel) Elad Suman	THAI FIGHT Vana Nava Hua Hin	Hua Hin district, Thailand	Decision	3	3:00
2022-10-16	Win	(Brazil) Luis Paulo Terra	THAI FIGHT	Bangkok, Thailand	KO	1	
2022-06-26	Win	(Myanmar) Tun Min Latt	THAI FIGHT Sisaket	Sisaket province, Thailand	KO	1	
2022-05-29	Win	(Iran) Mohammad Karimishargh	THAI FIGHT Nakhon Sawan	Nakhon Sawan province, Thailand	KO (Punches)	1	
2022-05-08	Win	(New Zealand) Daniel Kerr	THAI FIGHT Sung Noen	Sung Noen district, Thailand	KO	1	
2022-04-17	Win	(England) Thomas Carpenter	THAI FIGHT KonlakPathum	Pathum Thani, Thailand	TKO	2	
2021-12-19	Win	(England) Thomas Carpenter	THAI FIGHT Khao Aor	Phatthalung, Thailand	KO	1	
Wins the 2020 THAI FIGHT Kard Chuek King's Cup 72.5kg title.
2021-07-04	Win	(England) Nicolas Rooney	THAI FIGHT Strong	Pattaya, Thailand	KO	2	
2021-04-25	Win	(United States) Will Chope	THAI FIGHT DMHTT	Samut Sakhon, Thailand	KO	1	
2021-04-03	Win	(Kazakhstan) Nikolay Gussev	THAI FIGHT Nan	Nan, Thailand	KO	1	
2020-11-28	Win	(Brazil) Thiago Teixeira	THAI FIGHT Pluak Daeng	Rayong, Thailand	KO	1	
2020-11-07	Win	(New Zealand) Daniel Kerr	THAI FIGHT Korat 2020	Nakhon Ratchasima, Thailand	TKO	1	
2020-10-17	Win	(Russia) Mikhail Vetrila	THAI FIGHT Begins	Nonthaburi, Thailand	KO	2	
2020-09-19	Win	(Spain) Nicolas Mendes	THAI FIGHT New Normal	Bangkok, Thailand	KO	1	
2019-12-21	Win	(United States) Cyrus Washington	THAI FIGHT: Thai Fest in Patong	Phuket, Thailand	Decision	3	3:00
Wins the 2019 THAI FIGHT Kard Chuek Superfight 81kg title.
2019-11-23	Win	(Afghanistan) Shahram Delavar	THAI FIGHT Mae Sot	Mae Sot, Thailand	Decision	3	3:00
2019-10-26	Win	(Iran) Mohammad Hossein Doroudian	THAI FIGHT Bangsaen	Chonburi, Thailand	KO	1	
2019-08-24	Win	(Iran) Aboofazel Goodarzi	THAI FIGHT Kham Chanod 2019	Udon Thani, Thailand	KO	1	
2019-07-23	Win	(Iran) Mohammad Hossein Doroudian	THAI FIGHT Betong 2019	Betong, Thailand	Ext. Rd. Decision	4	3:00
2019-04-27	Win	(Australia) Simon Maait	THAI FIGHT Samui 2019	Samui, Thailand	KO	1	
2019-03-30	Win	(Russia) Evgenii Afanasev	THAI FIGHT Mueang Khon 2019	Nakhon Si Thammarat, Thailand	KO	2	
2019-02-23	Win	(Russia) Mikhail Vetrila	THAI FIGHT Phuket 2019	Phuket, Thailand	KO	1	
2018-06-01	Loss	(Hong Kong) Law Chosing	Kunlun Fight Macao	Macau, China	Decision	3	3:00
2017-04-08	Loss	(France) Hamza Ngoto	THAI FIGHT Paris	Paris, France	Decision	3	3:00
2016-10-29	Loss	(France) Jimmy Vienot	Best of Siam IX	Paris, France	Decision	5	3:00
2016-10-05	Win	(Germany) Erik Massion	THAI FIGHT Chengdu	Leshan, China	KO	1	
2016-09-11	Win	(England) Sam Gough	THAI FIGHT London	London, England	KO	1	
2016-08-20	Win	(Turkey) Sinan Uluturk	THAI FIGHT KMITL	Bangkok, Thailand	KO	1	
2016-08-20	Win	(Myanmar) Yan Naing Aung	THAI FIGHT KMITL	Bangkok, Thailand	KO	1	
2016-07-23	Win	(Cambodia) Sok Tauch	THAI FIGHT Proud To Be Thai 2016	Nonthaburi, Thailand	TKO	1	
2016-04-30	Win	(Brazil) Reinato Gomes	THAI FIGHT Samui 2016	Samui, Thailand	KO	1	
2016-03-19	Win	(Germany) Daniel Kerr	THAI FIGHT Korat 2016	Korat, Thailand	TKO	2	
2015-12-31	Win	(Brazil) José Neto	THAI FIGHT Count Down	Bangkok, Thailand	KO	1	
Wins the 2015 THAI FIGHT 70kg King's Cup title.
2015-11-21	Win	(France) Florian Breau	THAI FIGHT RPCA	Nakhon Pathom, Thailand	KO	1	
2015-10-24	Win	(Lithuania) Sigitas Gaizauskas	THAI FIGHT Proud to Be Thai 2015: Vietnam	Vietnam	KO	2	
2015-09-17	Win	(Russia) Aleksei Dodonov	THAI FIGHT Proud to Be Thai 2015: Moscow	Moscow, Russia	TKO	2	
2015-08-22	Win	(Belgium) Alka Matewa	THAI FIGHT Proud to Be Thai 2015: Narathiwat	Narathiwat, Thailand	Decision	3	3:00
2015-07-18	Win	(Brazil) Alex Oller	THAI FIGHT Proud to Be Thai 2015: China	Zhengzhou, China	KO	1	
2015-05-02	Win	(France) Gaëtan Dambo	THAI FIGHT Samui 2015	Samui, Thailand	Decision	3	3:00
2015-04-04	Win	(Thailand) Rungrawee P.K.SaenchaiMuaythaiGym	THAI FIGHT CRMA	Nakhon Nayok, Thailand	Decision	3	3:00
2015-01-24	Loss	(Thailand) Yodpayak Kaoklaigym	Omnoi Stadium	Bangkok, Thailand	Decision	5	3:00
2014-12-05	Win	(Israel) Ilya Grad	2014 King's Cup	Bangkok, Thailand	KO	4	
Wins 2014 King's Cup.
2014-12-05	Win	(Sweden) Carl N'Diaye	2014 King's Cup	Bangkok, Thailand	KO	1	
2014-11-08	Win	(Thailand) Kompetchlek Lookprabat	Omnoi Stadium	Bangkok, Thailand	KO	4	
Wins 2014 Weber 154lbs Muay Thai Tournament.
2014-11-02	Win	(Thailand) Superchamp Namduempinthipkorat	Omnoi Stadium	Bangkok, Thailand	KO	2	
2014-09-09	Win	(Thailand) Thepsutin Pumpanmuang	Omnoi Stadium	Bangkok, Thailand	KO	2	
2014-05-31	Win	(Thailand) Chalarmkao Rodbansomkiattrang	Omnoi Stadium	Bangkok, Thailand	KO	2	
2013-06-15	Draw	(France) Azize Hlali	Time Fight 3	Tours, France	Draw	3	
2013-05-04	Win	(Thailand) Lahoucine Idouche	La Nuit des Revanches	Bagnolet, France	Decision	5	3:00
2013-02-02	Win	(France) Azize Hlali	La Nuit des Titans	Tours, France	TKO	2	
2012-12-02	Win	(France) Patrick Djanang	Gala International Thai-Boxing	Reims, France	TKO (Referee stoppage)	5	
2012-09-19	Loss	(France) Abdallah Mabel	THAI FIGHT Extreme 2012: France	Lyon, France	TKO	2	
2012-04-28	Win	(France) Raphaël Llodra	Gala international de Boxe Thai & K1 Rules	Bagnolet, France	Decision	3	3:00
2012-04-28	Win	(France) Sofian Seboussi	Gala international de Boxe Thai & K1 Rules	Bangkok, Thailand	TKO (Injury)	1	
2012-03-17	Win	(France) Mickaël Piscitello	La Nuit des Titans	Tours, France	KO	1	
Wins the La Nuit des Titans 72kg Tournament.
2012-03-17	Win	(France) Farès Bechar	La Nuit des Titans	Tours, France	Decision	3	3:00
2011-08-06	Loss	(Thailand) Saksongkram Poptheeratham	Omnoi Stadium	Bangkok, Thailand	Decision	5	3:00
Legend: Win Loss Draw/No contest Notes

Amateur Muay Thai Record
Date	Result	Opponent	Event	Location	Method	Round	Time
2016-05-29	Loss	(Belarus) Vitaly Gurkov	2016 I.F.M.A. World Muaythai World Championships, Final	Jonkoping, Sweden			
Wins 2016 IFMA World Championships 75kg Silver Medal.
2016-05-27	Win		2016 I.F.M.A. World Muaythai World Championships, Semi Finals	Jonkoping, Sweden			
2016-05-25	Win	(United States) Troy Jones	2016 I.F.M.A. World Muaythai World Championships, Quarter Finals	Jonkoping, Sweden			
2016-05-21	Win		I.F.M.A. World Muaythai 2016 Championships	Jonkoping, Sweden			
Legend: Win Loss Draw/No contest Notes
