= Degrees north =

Degrees north (also styled °N) may refer to latitude at or above the equator. It may also refer to:

- 55 Degrees North, 2004–2005 British television drama series
- 71 Degrees North, 2010–2011 British reality television series

== See also ==
- Degree (disambiguation)
- North (disambiguation)
