= Gradl =

Gradl is a German surname. Notable people with the surname include:

- Hans Gradl (fl. 1940s), German World War II soldier
- Johann Baptist Gradl (1904–1988), German politician

== See also ==
- Grad (surname)
