= Grade =

Grade often refers to:

- Grading in education, a student's performance as determined by an educational assessment (e.g. A, pass, etc.)
- A designation for students, classes and curricula indicating the amount of years a student has completed in an educational stage (e.g. first grade, second grade, K–12, etc.)
- Grade (slope), the steepness of a slope
- Graded voting

Grade or grading may also refer to:

== Music ==
- Grade (music), a formally assessed level of proficiency in a musical instrument
- Grade (band), punk rock band
- Grades (producer), British electronic dance music producer and DJ

== Science and technology ==
=== Biology and medicine ===
- Grading (tumors), a measure of the aggressiveness of a tumor in medicine
- The Grading of Recommendations Assessment, Development and Evaluation (GRADE) approach
- Evolutionary grade, a paraphyletic group of organisms

=== Geology ===
- Graded bedding, a description of the variation in grain size through a bed in a sedimentary rock
- Metamorphic grade, an indication of the degree of metamorphism of rocks
- Ore grade, a measure that describes the concentration of a valuable natural material in the surrounding ore

=== Engineering and technology ===
- Grade (fasteners), the grade of nuts and bolts refers to the strength and material
- Grading (earthworks), the preparation and leveling of land for construction, especially of roads and railways
- Grade separation, aligning a junction of two or more transport axes at different heights to facilitate traffic flow
- Cetane rating, a measure of diesel fuel's combustion quality
- Octane rating, also called gasoline grade, the measure of the autoignition resistance of gasoline (petrol) and other fuels used in spark-ignition internal combustion engines
- Grade of service, the quality of voice service in telecommunications
- Color grading, the process of altering and enhancing the color of a motion picture, video image, or still image
- A rating of lumber (timber) quality and strength

=== Mathematics ===
- Grade (angle), a unit for the measurement of plane angles
- Grade (ring theory), a cohomological invariant in commutative algebra
- Graded (mathematics), with several meanings
- Graded poset, a partially ordered set equipped with a rank function, sometimes called a ranked poset
- Graded vector space, a vector space with an extra piece of structure
- Graded algebra, an algebra over a field (or ring) with an extra piece of structure

=== Linguistics ===
- Grade, each of the "levels" of vowel gradation, especially in Indo-European
- Grade, or degree, one of the comparative forms of an adjective

== Sport ==
- Grade (climbing), a climber's assessment of the difficulty and danger of climbing a hill
- Grade (bouldering), a climber's assessment of the difficulty and danger of climbing a route which are distinct from those used in regular climbing
- Degree of difficulty, in several sports
- International Scale of River Difficulty, also called grade, a standardized scale used to rate the safety of a stretch of river, or a single rapid

== Other uses ==
- Grade (crime), the degree of seriousness of a crime
- Military rank
- Grade (surname) (includes a list of people with the name)
- Grade, Cornwall, a village in the UK
- Coin grading, the process of determining the condition of a collectible coin
- Food grading, the inspection, assessment and sorting of foods to determine quality, freshness, legal conformity and market value
- Paper currency grading, the process of determining the condition of a collectible bank note
- Pattern grading, the scaling of a pattern to a different size in the clothing or footwear industry
- Third-party grading, grading of collectible items by an independent service

== See also ==
- Degree (disambiguation)
- Grad (disambiguation)
- Gradation (disambiguation)
- Gradient
- grade nouveau
- Rank (disambiguation)
- Rating (disambiguation)
