= Elias Ammerbach =

German organist and transcriber

Elias Nikolaus Ammerbach
- Born: 1530; Naumburg
- Died: January 29, 1597 (aged 66–67)
- Education: University of Leipzig
- Occupation: Organist

Elias Nikolaus Ammerbach (c. 1530 – January 29, 1597) was a German organist and arranger of organ music of the Renaissance. He published the earliest printed book of organ music in Germany and is grouped among the composers known as the Colorists.

He was born in Naumburg, educated at the University of Leipzig (1548–49), and was afterwards employed as organist at the Thomaskirche in Leipzig, probably for the rest of his life. He was married three times (his first two wives died). According to the preface of his 1571 publication of organ tablature he traveled to foreign lands to study, but he gave no specifics.

Ammerbach developed a method of music notation for keyboard playing, known as tablature, which was specifically adapted for organ. His method became known as the "new German organ tablature" and involved letter notation for the pitches with rhythmic symbols placed above.

It is not known if Ammerbach was himself a composer; if he was, he did not sign his music. His publications of music in tablature include arrangements of numerous composers popular in the mid-16th century, including Ludwig Senfl, Heinrich Isaac, Josquin des Prez, Clemens non Papa, Orlande de Lassus, and others; Lassus is particularly well represented, as can be expected both because of his extraordinary fame and his presence in Germany (he was in Munich between 1563 and 1594). Most of the secular music in Ammerbach's collections is printed with German titles, while sacred music retains Latin. In his last publication (1583) he includes a considerable quantity of Italian madrigals arranged for keyboard.

== References and further reading ==
- William Young, Clyde (1980). "Ammerbach, Elias Nikolaus". In Sadie, Stanley (ed.). The New Grove Dictionary of Music and Musicians. Vol. i (1st ed.). London: Macmillan. pp. 327–329.
- Gustave Reese, Music in the Renaissance. New York, W.W. Norton & Co., 1954. ISBN 0-393-09530-4.
