= Ilya Grad =

Israeli Muay Thai boxing champion (born 1987)

- Born: June 22, 1987 (age 39); Russia
- Native name: איליה גראד
- Other names: Achilles
- Nationality: Israeli
- Height: 192 cm (6 ft 4 in)
- Weight: 72.5 kg (160 lb)
- Division: Lightweight; Middleweight
- Style: Muay Thai
- Fighting out of: Thailand

Kickboxing record
- Total: 56
- Wins: 40
- By knockout: 18
- Losses: 16
- Draws: 0

Ilya Grad (Hebrew: איליה גראד; born June 22, 1987) is an Israeli Muay Thai boxing champion. His current professional record stands at 35-13 (16 KOs). In 2010 he was considered one of the eight best amateur Muai Thai boxers in the world. In February 2012, Grad won the WCK international title in China, In January 2013 the I-1 WMC world professional title in Hong Kong and in April WMC title in Singapore. Grad also made history by being the first known Israeli fighter to enter Malaysia under his Israeli passport.

== Early life ==
Grad attributes much of his success to martial arts claiming that it led him away from the self-destructive path of bar fights in Jerusalem. He goes by the fight name “Achilles” in part, because of his fondness for Greek mythology and good looks.

== Controversies ==
During the 2009 kick boxing championships in Bangkok, Grad met fellow kick boxer and Iranian kick boxing team captain Mostafa Abdollahi. Despite the political discourse between the respective countries, the two quickly became friends, began training together and acted as corner-men for each other. A Muay Thai Federation website published the story but removed it after Iranian protests.

=== The Challenger Muaythai controversy ===
In 2011, Grad became the first Israeli boxer to legally enter Malaysia after being invited to participate in the AXN Asia reality show, "The Challenger Muaythai" featuring various Muay Thai fighters from different countries. Malaysia, a predominantly Muslim nation, officially bans Israelis from entering the country. When he arrived at Kuala Lumpur airport, Grad was detained for 25 hours, but was finally allowed to enter the country following the intervention of the Malaysian Minister of Sports. During his first bout, the show's producers asked him to carry the Russian flag after his place of birth. He refused and stated that he would rather return home, after which the producers allowed him to proceed with the Israeli flag. When he entered the ring, the local audience booed him. He was matched against French fighter, Antoine Pinto but lost in a split decision. The two Malaysian judges voted against Grad while the Thai judge voted in his favor. Grad believed he had won the fight as did his corner-men and believed that politics played a role in the decision-making process.

I threw an upper elbow to meet his movement and cut him over the eyebrow. As I saw the blood pouring down his face I rushed forward and in the clinch I used big elbows and saw a big lump growing slowly over his forehead. The round was totally mine and my strategy proved to be effective. For the rest of the fight I claimed the center of the ring and Antoine was mostly on the ropes, working the middle kicks. The fight was close, but not hard. I was never physically hurt, I never lost my power and I was never on the ropes on the defensive side. I felt in control throughout the entire match.

After the fight, Grad was approached by audience members who apologized for jeering him and informed him that they thought he had won the fight.

== Awards ==
- Israeli champion 2006/2007/2008/2009
- Baltic champion 2007
- IFMA world championships 3rd-place winner 2009
- IFMA Asia champion 2010
- I-1 Grand Slam 2011 runner up
- WCK pro International Champion 2012
- Kings Trophy 2012 semi finalist
- Toyota Cup 2012 semi finalist
- I-1 World Champion 2013
- WMC World Champion 2013

In April 2012, Shalom Life ranked him Number 1 on its list of “the 50 most talented, intelligent, funny, and gorgeous Jewish men in the world.”

== Fight record ==
Muay Thai record
40 Wins, 16 Losses
Date	Result	Opponent	Event	Location	Method	Round	Time
2018-12-01	No Contest	(France) Jimmy Vienot	Credissimo Golden Fight	Levallois-Perret, France	No Contest	1	
For the WMC World 160lbs title.
2018-06-16	Win	(Thailand) Chujaroen Dabransarakarm	Topking World Series	Surat Thani, Thailand	KO	3	3:00
2018-05-20	Win	(Thailand) Chanchai Sittisukato	Real Hero	Bangkok, Thailand	KO	1	0:38
2018-05-20	Win	(Thailand) Yodpayak Sitsongpeenong	Real Hero	Bangkok, Thailand	Decision	1	5:00
2018-05-20	Win	(Portugal) Ricardo Braga	Real Hero	Bangkok, Thailand	KO	1	0:39
2014-12-05	Win	(Thailand) Tengnueng Sitjaesairoong	2014 King's Cup	Bangkok, Thailand	KO	4	
2019-12-05	Win	(Brazil) Robin Elite Fight Club	2014 King's Cup	Bangkok, Thailand	Decision	5	3:00
2014-09-07	Win	(Australia) Bradley Stephen	MAX Muay Thai	Pattaya, Thailand	Decision	3	3:00
2014-09-07	Win	(Thailand) Chanchai Sittisukato	MAX Muay Thai	Pattaya, Thailand	Decision	3	3:00
2013-04-13	Win	(Malaysia) Faizal Ramli	Muaythai Singapore Challenge	Singapore	Decision	5	3:00
2013-01-07	Win	(Malaysia) Faizal Ramli	WMC I-1 World Muay Thai Grand Extreme 2013	Hong Kong	TKO	2	
2013-01-07	Win	(Germany) Sebastian Harms-Mendez	WMC I-1 World Muay Thai Grand Extreme 2013	Hong Kong	TKO	2	
2012-04-03	Loss	(United Kingdom) Jordan Watson	The Royal Trophy	Bangkok, Thailand	Decision	3	3:00
2011-12-19	Win	(Thailand) M-100 Sitpholek	WMC I-1 Grand Xtreme 2011	Hong Kong	Decision	3	3:00
2011-12-19	Loss	(South Africa) Vuyisile Colossa	WMC I-1 Grand Xtreme 2011	Hong Kong	Decision	3	3:00
2011-09-17	Loss	(France) Antoine Pinto	The Challenger Muay Thai	Kuala Lumpur, Malaysia	Decision	3	3:00
2006-04-08	Loss	(France) Mohamed Bourkhis	La Nuit des Superfights IV	Paris, France	Decision	5	3:00
Legend: Win Loss Draw/No contest Notes

== See also ==
- List of select Jewish mixed martial artists
