= Sebastian Virdung =

German composer and organologist

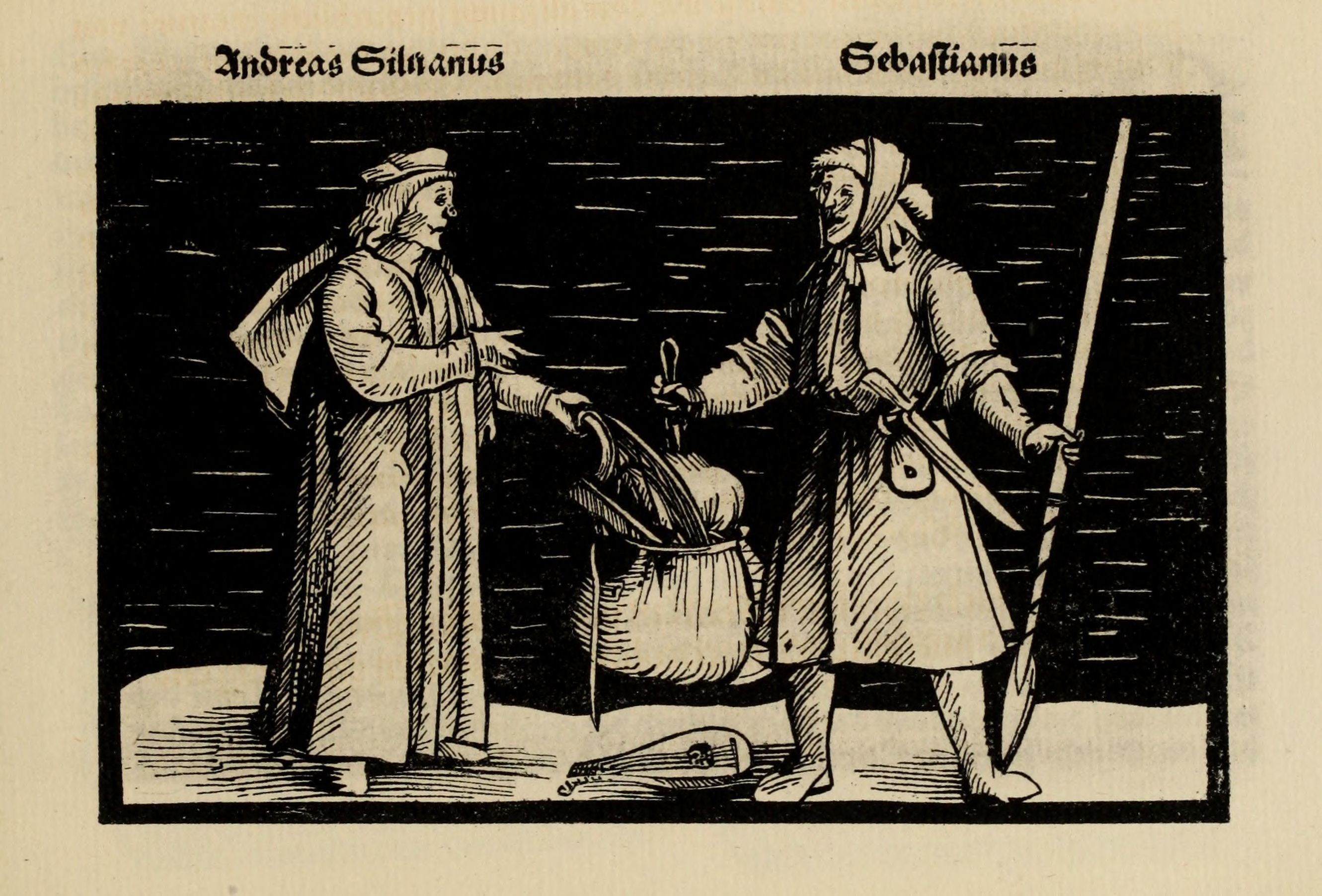
Sebastianus Virdung (right) and Andreas Siluanus, from Musica getutscht by Sebastian Virdung.

Sebastian Virdung (born c. 1465) was a German composer and theorist on musical instruments. He is grouped among the composers known as the Colorists. He studied in Heidelberg as a scholar of Johannes von Soest at the chapel of the ducal court. After being ordained, he became chaplain at the court in Heidelberg. Virdung sung in the choir as a male alto until 1505/1506. Around 1506 he became a singer in the chapel of the court of Württemberg in Stuttgart. The following year, in January 1507, he received one of nine succentorships at Konstanz Cathedral where he educated the choirboys until he was dismissed in 1508 presumably for his difficult temperament.

In 1511, he published his treatise Musica getuscht und ausgezogen. The text is described as the first printed book on the subject. It covered the theory of music, counterpoint and composition. However, none of these subjects are to be found in the printed work that survives. Existing sections are based on instruments with illustrations and is notable for being the oldest printed source on this subject. The second is said to be Musica instrumentalis deudsch (1529) by Martin Agricola. These works are both illustrated, and important for the history of European instruments. It classifies instruments into families. It is also a source on musical notation.
