= Colorist (music) =

Group of sixteenth-century German organ composers

The Colorists (German: Koloristen) were a group of sixteenth-century German organ composers that heavily ornamented their compositions following Italian coloraturas and other figures. Among others, the colorists include Sebastian Virdung, Arnolt Schlick, Elias Nikolaus Ammerbach, Paul Hofhaimer, Bernhard Schmid the Elder, Bernhard Schmid the Younger, Jacob Paix, Conrad Paumann, and Johann Woltz. The term was originally a derogatory designation applied by August Gottfried Ritter (1811–1885), and they were accused of having "overindulge[d] in the use of splashy and meaningless coloratura passages."
