= Grade (surname) =

Grade is a surname. Notable people with the surname include:

- Chaim Grade (1910-1982), Yiddish writer
- Hans Grade (1879–1946), German aviation pioneer
- Leslie Grade (1916–1979), British theatrical agent
- Lew Grade, Baron Grade (1906–1998), British impresario
- Michael Grade (born 1943), British television executive and businessman
