= Gradation =

Gradation may refer to:

- Gradation (music), gradual change within one parameter or an overlapping of two blocks of a wavelength.
- Gradation (album), 1988 pop album by Shizuka Kudo
- Gradation (art), visual technique of gradually transitioning from one colour or texture to another
- Consonant gradation, mutation in which consonant sounds alternate between various "grades"
- Apophony or vowel gradation, sound change within a word that indicates grammatical information
- Calibration, comparison of measurement values of a device with a standard of known accuracy
- Production of a graded algebra

== See also ==
- Color grading, process of altering and enhancing the color of an image
- Comparison (grammar), a feature whereby adjectives or adverbs indicate relative degree
- Evaluation, systematic determination of a subject's merit, worth and significance
- Grade (disambiguation)
- Gradient (disambiguation)
- Degradation (disambiguation)
