= Gradient sro =

- Company type: Privately held company
- Industry: Aerospace
- Founded: 1997
- Headquarters: Prague, Czech Republic
- Products: Paragliders
- Website: www.gradient.cx

Gradient sro is a Czech aircraft manufacturer based in Prague and founded in 1997. The company specializes in the design and manufacture of paragliders in the form of ready-to-fly aircraft.

The company is organized as a společnost s ručením omezeným (sro), a Czech private limited company.

The company has produced a wide range of paragliders, including the intermediate sport Aspen, the Avax competition wing, the two-place tandem BiOnyx, the intermediate performance Bliss, the beginner and flight training Bright and the intermediate Golden

The company has ceased publishing performance specifications for its gliders, stating:

Gradient has decided to end the rat-race in publishing of performance data. The rubbery nature of these figures makes it impossible to obtain or prove them with any acceptable degree of accuracy. In the last few years this situation lead to publishing one guesswork after another and there was always a room for improvement on the paper. In the end the bolder the manufacturer, the more dazzling figures they produced. This reality has been well known to everybody in this industry for a long time and it is time to pull the plug on this escalating image building hysteria. Some other manufacturers are following suit already and we can only hope more will join that number. If you want to see the usual "precise figures", sorry, we can't help - we don't have them. We don't feel it is fair publishing any figures in the absence of fixed standards for recording of performance data in this industry.

== Aircraft ==
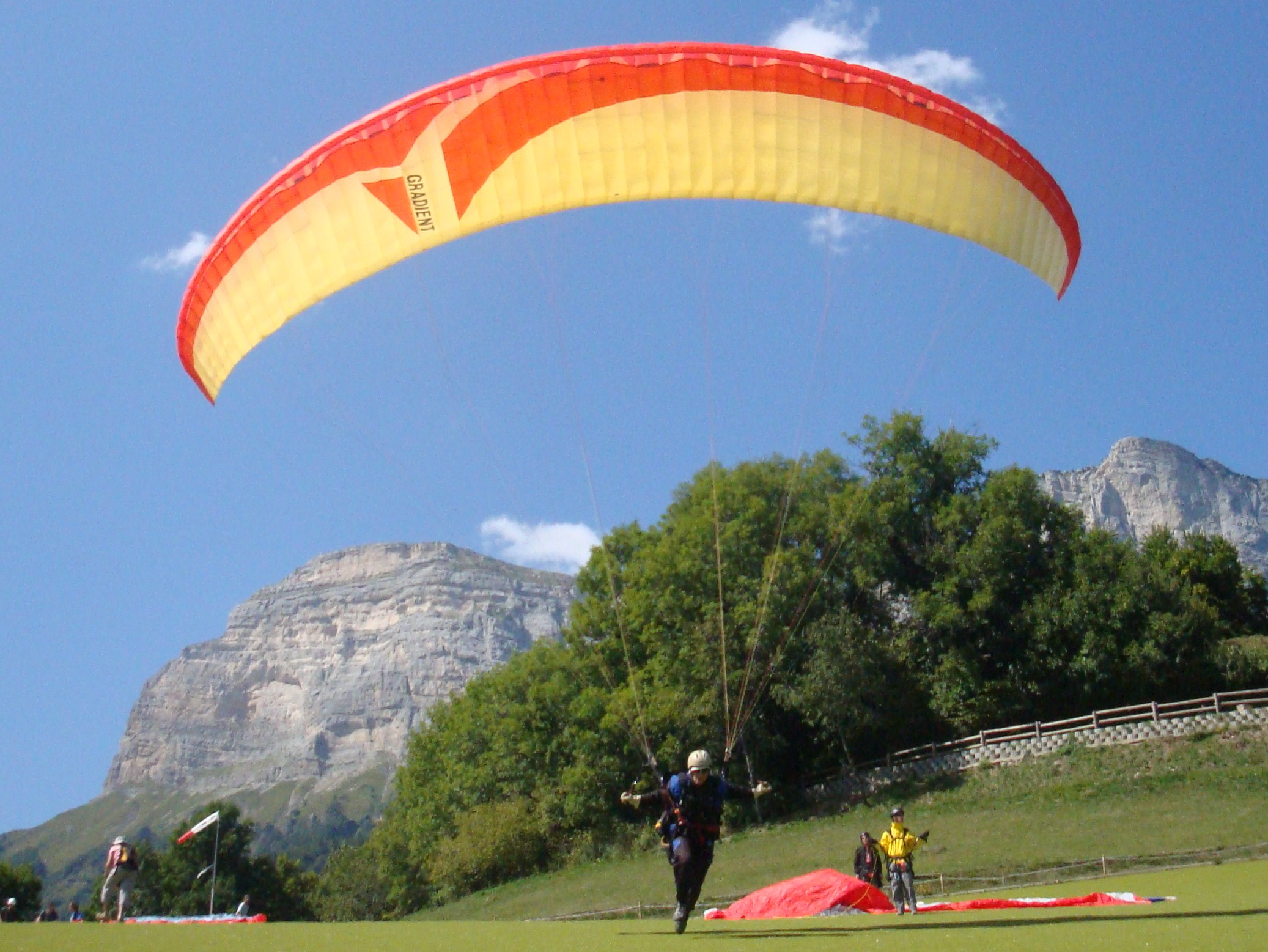
Gradient Aspen

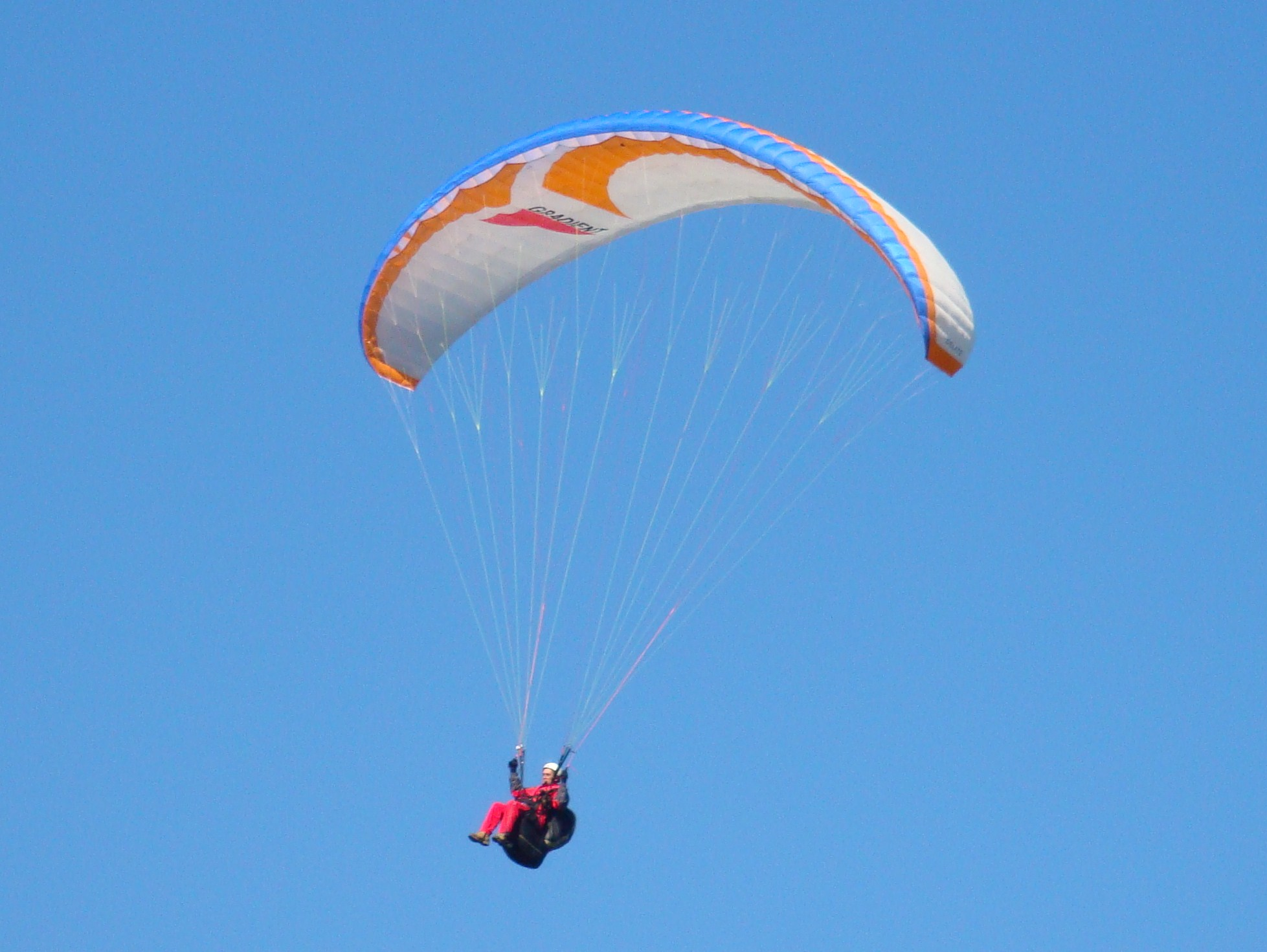
Gradient Delite

Summary of aircraft built by Gradient:

- Gradient Agility
- Gradient Aspen
- Gradient Avax
- Gradient BiGolden
- Gradient BiOnyx
- Gradient Bliss
- Gradient Bright
- Gradient Delite
- Gradient Denali
- Gradient Eiger
- Gradient Freestyle
- Gradient Golden
- Gradient Montana
- Gradient Nevada
