= Grad (surname) =

Grad is the surname of the following people:

- Adam Grad (1969–2015), Polish association football player
- Aleksander Grad (born 1962), Polish politician
- Corrine Grad Coleman (1927–2004), American writer and women's rights activist
- Dagmara Grad (born 1990), Polish association football player
- Geneviève Grad (1944–2024), French actress
- Harold Grad (1923–1986), American mathematician
- Ilya Grad (born 1987), Israeli Muay Thai boxing champion
- Tzahi Grad (born 1962), Israeli actor
