= August Gottfried Ritter =

German composer (1811–1885)

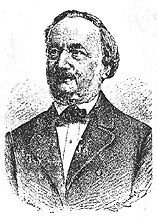
August Gottfried Ritter

August Gottfried Ritter (25 August 1811 – 26 August 1885) was a German romantic composer and organist.

== Biography ==
Co-creator, together with Felix Mendelssohn Bartholdy, of the first example of Romantic Organ Sonata (the first one was composed in 1845); he moved in 1847 from being organist in Merseburg cathedral to become organist in Magdeburg Cathedral. He also was "Royal-Prussian organ auditor". Ritter organized to build a new main organ in Magdeburg Cathedral and designed the stoplist. The organ with four manuals, mechanical key action and 81 stops was built by Adolf Reubke in 1856 to 1861.

In his critical writings, Ritter condemned the Renaissance organ composers referred to as the "Colorists" for overindulging in ornamentation.

== Compositions ==
- Toccata in D minor for organ
- Choral Preludes for organ (opp. 7, 8 & 9)
- First Organ Sonata in D minor, op. 11 (ca. 1845)
- Second Organ Sonata in E minor, op. 19 (ca. 1850)
- Third Organ Sonata in A minor, op. 23, dedicated to Franz Liszt (ca. 1855)
- Fourth Organ Sonata in A major, op. 31 (ca. 1855)
- Andante in A minor, Op. 26 (arrangement of second movement from Beethoven's Seventh Symphony)
- Preludes, postludes etc.
- XXXII der gebräuchlichsten Choräle : mit Vor- und Zwischenspielen tacktgemäß verbunden : und mit Bezeichnung der Register und der Applicaturen versehen für die ersten Versuche im gottesdienstlichen Orgelspiele (32 Chorale-preludes)
- Sinfonie concertante for 2 bassoons and orchestra
- Variations on "Heil dir im Siegerkranz" for organ
- Second Piano Sonata, op. 21

== Publications ==
- Zur Geschichte des Orgelspieles, vornehmlich des deutschen, im 14. bis zum Anfang des 18. Jahrhunderts (The History of Organ Playing from 14th to the 18th Centuries, in 2 volumes) (1884)
- Kunst des Orgelspiels (The Art of Organ Playing), Op. 15
