= Coloratura =

Type of elaborate melody

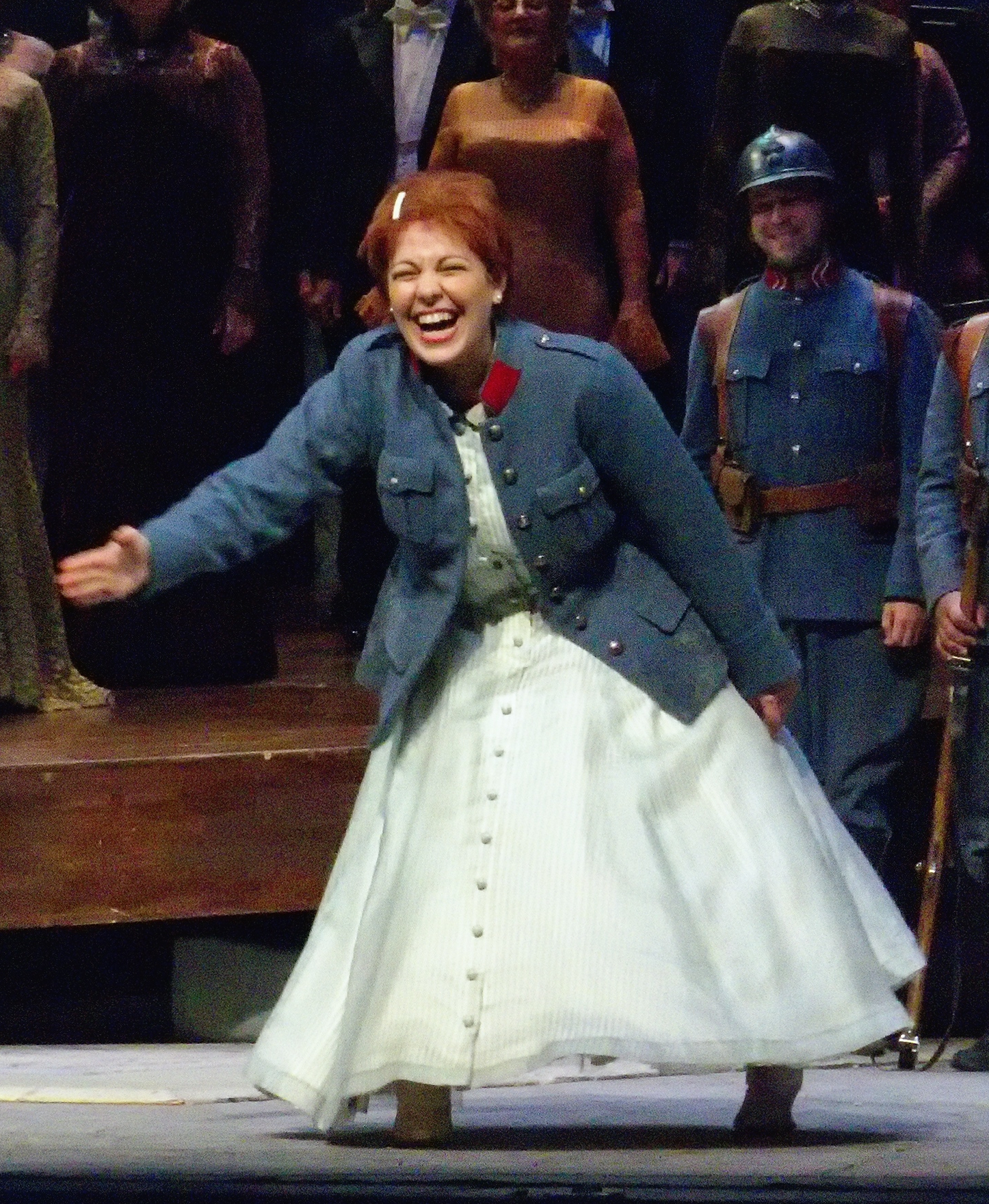
Nino Machaidze, in the coloratura role of Marie, in La Fille du Régiment at the Metropolitan Opera House in 2011.

Coloratura (/ˌkʌlərəˈtjʊərə/, /ˌkɒl-/) is a passage of music, especially vocal operatic music, that is characterised by rapidity and elaborate embellishment or ornamentation that includes musical runs, trills, "or similar virtuoso-like material". The presence of coloratura in a musical piece typically obscures the melody within the passage.

More generally, coloratura can be understood to mean any music "with ornate figuration", and then connotations of coloratura broaden further still to include the operatic roles in which such vocal embellishment plays a large part, and then to its singers, in particular sopranos with a "light agile voice[s]" that specialise in singing such parts.

Such coloratura, for sopranos and otherwise, is often found in the vocal melodies of arias of the 18th and 19th centuries (appearing as aria di coloratura, aria di bravura, and Koloraturarie); an example cited as famous is the aria of the operatic character, the Queen of the Night, in Mozart's Zauberflöte (The Magic Flute).

However, despite the popular understanding associating the term with coloratura sopranos, the term is not formally restricted to a particular voice range, and any voice type might achieve mastery of coloratura techniques. Moreover, coloratura is not limited to particular musical genres, and use of the term has conflictingly also been applied to particular instrumental "ornamentation formulas" (e.g., for keyboard and lute of the 16th-century), where the term of Colorists (German Koloristen) coined by A.G. Ritter more specifically applies. (In instrumental music, such passages are more often called ornamentation.)

The origin of the term coloratura, in its application to vocal embellishment, is usually attributed to the Italian, of 17th century, for "coloring", and that from the Latin colōrātus, deriving from the verb "to color". Argument is made in a reliable source that, depite having been "attributed to Italian in German dictionaries since the 17th century", its apparent first appearance in a musical sense was in a German work, as Coloraturen, by Michael Praetorius, in his Syntagmatis musici tomus tertius in 1619.

== History ==
The term coloratura was first defined in several early non-Italian music dictionaries: Michael Praetorius's Syntagma musicum (1618); Sébastien de Brossard's Dictionaire de musique (1703); and Johann Gottfried Walther's Musicalisches Lexicon (1732). In these early texts "the term is dealt with briefly and always with reference to Italian usage".

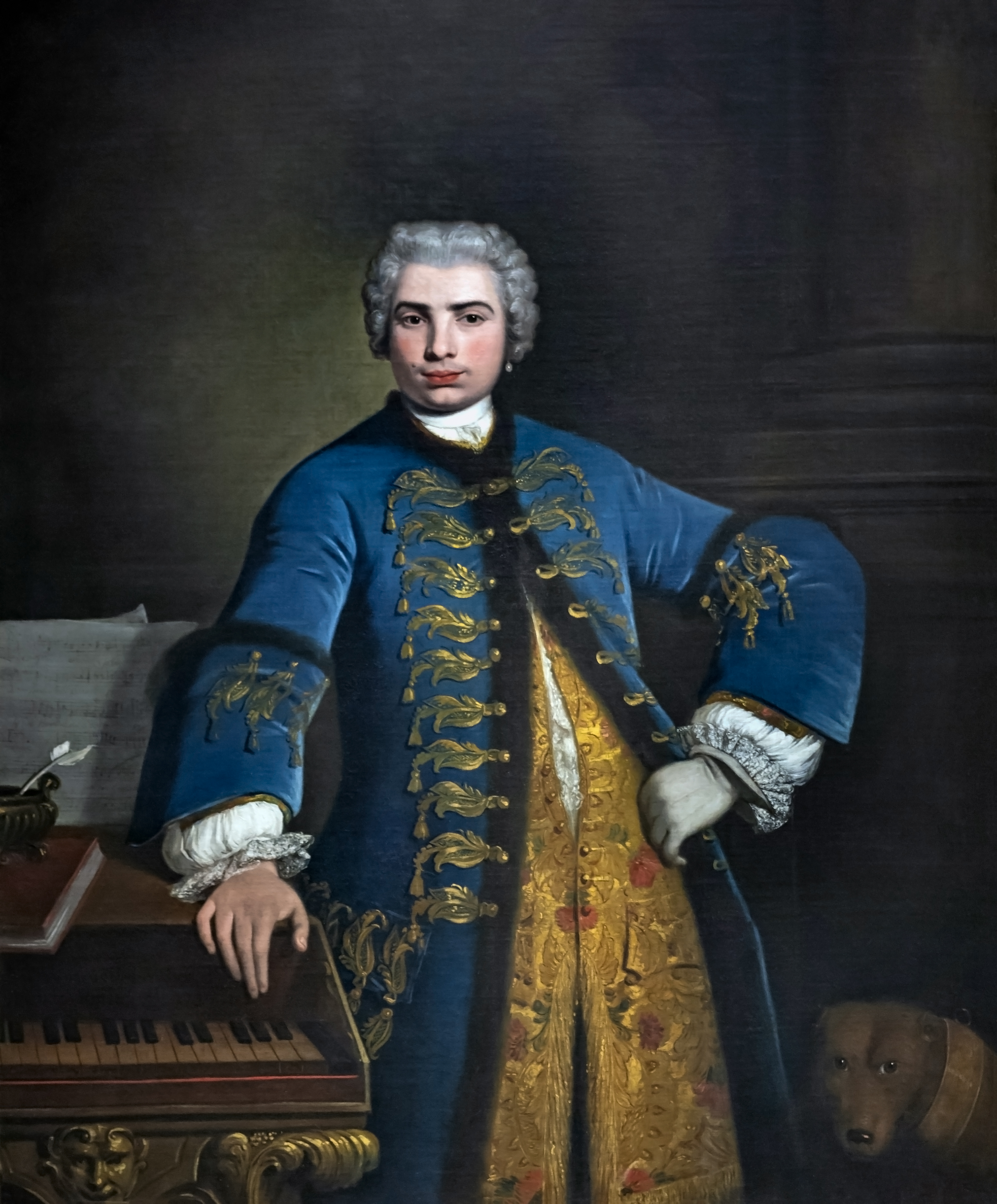
Farinelli, a soprano castrato famous for singing baroque coloratura roles (painting by Bartolomeo Nazari, 1734).

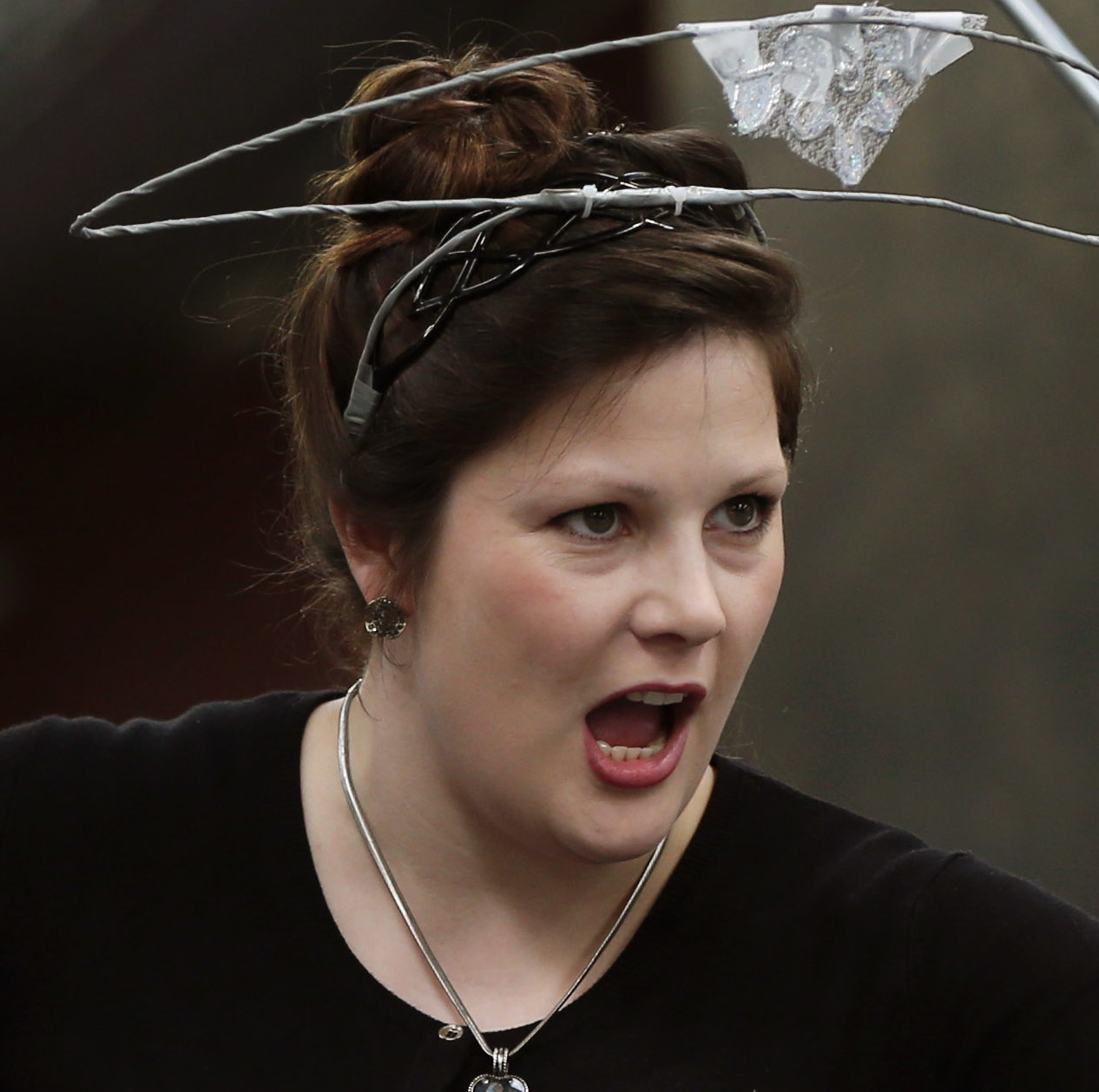
Ruth Jenkins-Róbertsson, in rehearsal for the Queen of the Night coloratura role, in the opera Die Zauberflöte by W. A. Mozart, at the New Zealand Opera in 2016.

Christoph Bernhard (1628–1692) defined coloratura in two ways:

- cadenza: "runs which are not so exactly bound to the bar, but which often extend two, three or more bars further [and] should be made only at chief closes" (Von der Singe-Kunst, oder Maniera, c. 1649); and
- diminution: "when an interval is altered through several shorter notes, so that, instead of one long note, a number of shorter ones rush to the next note through all kinds of progressions by step or leap" (Tractatus compositionis, c. 1657).

The term was never used in the most famous Italian texts on singing: Giulio Caccini's Le Nuove musiche (1601/2); Pier Francesco Tosi's, Opinioni de' cantori antichi e moderni (1723); Giovanni Battista Mancini's Pensieri, e riflessioni pratiche sopra il canto figurato (1774); Manuel García's Mémoire sur la voix humaine (1841), and Traité complet de l’art du chant (1840–47); nor was it used by the English authors Charles Burney (1726–1814) and Henry Fothergill Chorley (1808–1872), both of whom wrote at length about Italian singing of a period when ornamentation was essential.

== Modern usage ==
The term coloratura is most commonly applied to the elaborate and florid figuration or ornamentation in classical (late 18th century) and romantic (19th century, specifically bel canto) vocal music. However, early music of the 15th, 16th and 17th centuries, and in particular, baroque music extending up to about 1750, includes a substantial body of music for which coloratura technique is required by vocalists and instrumentalists alike. In the modern musicological sense the term is therefore used to refer to florid music from all periods of music history, both vocal and instrumental. For example, in Germany the term coloratura (German: Koloratur) has been applied to the stereotypical and formulaic ornamentation used in 16th‑century keyboard music written by a group of German organ composers referred to as the "colorists" (German: Koloristen).

Despite its derivation from Latin colorare ("to color"), the term does not apply to the practice of "coloring" the voice, i.e. altering the quality or timbre of the voice for expressive purposes (for example, the technique of voix sombrée used by Gilbert Duprez in the 1830s).

== Vocal ranges ==
The term is not restricted to describing any one range of voice. All female and male voice types may achieve mastery of coloratura technique. There are coloratura parts for all voice types in different musical genres.

Nevertheless, the term coloratura, when used without further qualification, normally means a coloratura soprano. This role, most famously typified by the Queen of the Night in Mozart's The Magic Flute, has a high range and requires the singer to execute with great facility elaborate ornamentation and embellishment, including running passages, staccati, and trills. A coloratura soprano has the vocal ability to produce notes above high C (C_{6}) and possesses a tessitura ranging from A_{4} to A_{5} or higher (unlike lower sopranos whose tessitura is G_{4}–G_{5} or lower).

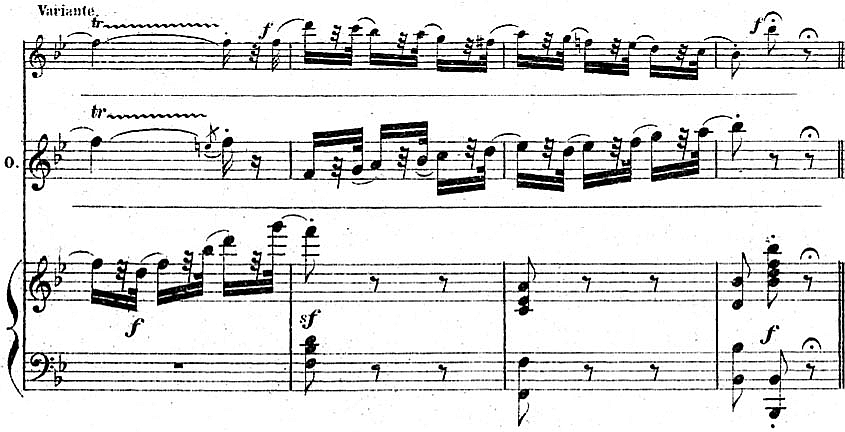
An example of a coloratura passage, a piano-vocal score, for a soprano role, the final cadenza from Ophélie's Mad Scene, from the 1868 opera Hamlet, by Ambroise Thomas.

Richard Miller names two types of soprano coloratura voices (the coloratura and the dramatic coloratura) as well as a mezzo-soprano coloratura voice, and although he does not mention the coloratura contralto, he includes mention of specific works requiring coloratura technique for the contralto voice.

Examples of the broader possibilities for coloratura in different voice ranges include:

- Agitata da due venti ("Agitated by two winds") is a coloratura soprano aria, in Antonio Vivaldi's opera Griselda;
- Mozart's Allelujah (from Exsultate, jubilate) was written for soprano castrato, but may be arranged for and sung by a properly trained contralto, mezzo-soprano, or soprano;
- Naqui All'Affanno - Non Piu Mesta is a coloratura contralto rondo, from Rossini's opera La Cenerentola;
- Osmin, a character in Mozart's The Abduction from the Seraglio, is a coloratura role for a base voice (basso).

More generally, singers of major roles in Rossini operas must have a secure coloratura technique.

== See also ==
- Bel canto
- Diatonic and chromatic § Medieval coloration

== Works cited ==
- Apel, Willi, ed. (1969). Harvard Dictionary of Music (illustr., rev. ed.). Cambridge, MA: Belknap-Harvard University Press. p. 184. ISBN 9780674375017. "Coloratura [It.] A rapid passage, run, trill, or similar virtuoso-like material, particularly in vocal melodies of the 18th- and 19th-century operatic arias: aria do coloratura, aria di bravura, Koloraturarie. A famous example is the aria of the Queen of the Night in Mozart's Zauberflöte. The term is also used for the stereotyped ornamentation formulas of the 16th-century keyboard and lute music [see Colorists... G. Koloristen]. A name introduced by A. G. Ritter... where "It." and "G." abbreviate "Italian" and "German", respectively." For the Wikipedia article on this source, see Harvard Dictionary of Music.
- Jander, Owen; Harris, Ellen T. (May 16, 2008). "Coloratura". Grove Music Online. Archived from the original on May 16, 2008.
- Miller, Richard (2000). Training Soprano Voices. New York, NY: Oxford University Press. ISBN 9780195130188.
- Randel, Don Michael, ed. (1986). New Harvard Dictionary of Music. Cambridge, MA: Belknap-Harvard University Press. ISBN 9780674615250.
- Steane, J. B.; Jander, Owen (1992). Sadie, Stanley (ed.). The New Grove Dictionary of Opera. Vol. 1. London, England: Macmillan. p. 907. ISBN 9781561592289.
