= Degree =

Degree may refer to:

== As a unit of measurement ==
- Degree (angle), a unit of angle measurement
  - Degree of geographical latitude
  - Degree of geographical longitude
- Degree symbol (°), a notation used in science, engineering, and mathematics
- Degree (temperature), any of various units of temperature measurement
- Degree API, a measure of density in the petroleum industry
- Degree Baumé, a pair of density scales
- Degree Brix, a measure of sugar concentration
- Degree Gay-Lussac, a measure of the alcohol content of a liquid by volume, ranging from 0° to 100°
- Degree proof, or simply proof, the alcohol content of a liquid, ranging from 0° to 175° in the UK, and from 0° to 200° in the U.S.
- Degree of curvature, a unit of curvature measurement, used in civil engineering
- Degrees of freedom (mechanics), the number of displacements or rotations needed to define the position and orientation of a body
- Degrees of freedom (physics and chemistry), a concept describing dependence on a countable set of parameters
- Degree of frost, a unit of temperature measurement
- Degrees Lintner, a measure of enzymatic activity
- Degrees Lovibond, a measure of transparency
- Degree of unsaturation, in organic chemistry, also known as the index of hydrogen deficiency or rings plus double bonds
- dGH, degrees of general hardness of water
- Degree of carbonate hardness of water (degree KH)

== In mathematics ==
- Degree of a polynomial, the exponent of its term with the highest exponent
- Degree of a field extension
- Degree of an algebraic number field, its degree as a field extension of the rational numbers
- Degree of an algebraic variety
- Degree (graph theory), or valency, the number of edges incident to a vertex of a graph
- Degree of a continuous mapping, a generalization of winding number
- Degrees of freedom, the number of parameters of a system that may vary independently
- Degree of a character in representation theory
- Degree of unsolvability in recursion theory
- Degree of a central simple algebra
- Degree of a permutation group, the number of elements that are permuted
- Degree of a differential equation, the power of the highest derivative therein
- Degree of a nth root

== In education ==
Academic degree, an academic rank, title or award

- Substantive degree ranks from lowest to highest
  - Academic certificate
  - Foundation degree
  - Associate's degree
  - Bachelor's degree
  - Master's degree
  - Doctorate degree
  - Professional degree
- Particular degrees (focus or method)
  - Engineer's degree
  - Specialist degree
  - Lambeth degree
  - External degree
  - Microdegree
- Honorary degrees
  - Ad eundem degree
  - Honorary degree
- Other
  - Vocational degree
  - Honours degree

== Other measures ==
- Degree (music), identification of a note in a scale by its relation to the tonic
- Degree of inventiveness in inventions and patents
- Degree of separation in connectivity between groups (first degree is closest)
- Degree of relationship, in kinship between individuals (first degree is closest)
  - Consanguinity, or level of kinship
- Comparison (grammar) - degrees of comparison include positive, comparative, and superlative (e.g. "good", "better", and "best", respectively)
- The severity of a crime, e.g., first degree murder (first degree is worst)
- The intensity of a burn (the higher the worse)
- A level of initiation, often used in fraternal organizations
- A ranking of black belt, in certain martial arts

== People ==
- Asha Jaquilla Degree (born 1990), an American child who went missing in 2000

== Brands ==
- Da Degrees, Canadian record label and hip hop collective
- Degree (deodorant), a brand of antiperspirant

== Other uses ==
- Degree (freemasonry)
- Degree of Knights Templar (Freemasonry), a special case of a degree in freemasonry

== See also ==
- Grad (disambiguation)
- Grade (disambiguation)
