= Grad, Visoko =

Grad Град
- Village
- Location within Bosnia and Herzegovina
- Coordinates: 43.9767718°N 18.1616199°E
- Country: Bosnia and Herzegovina
- Entity: Federation of Bosnia and Herzegovina
- Canton: Zenica-Doboj
- Municipality: Visoko

Area
  - Total: 1.01 sq mi (2.62 km^{2})

Population (2013)
  - Total: 238
  - Density: 235/sq mi (90.8/km^{2})
- Time zone: UTC+1 (CET)
  - Summer (DST): UTC+2 (CEST)

Grad is a village in the municipality of Visoko, Bosnia and Herzegovina.

== Demographics ==
According to the 2013 census, its population was 238.

Ethnicity in 2013
Ethnicity	Number	Percentage
Bosniaks	233	97.9%
Croats	3	1.3%
other/undeclared	2	0.8%
Total	238	100%
