= King's Cup (Muay Thai) =

The Kings Cup Super 8 Tournament is an annual Muay Thai event staged on December 5 to honor the birthday of Bhumibol Adulyadej, the King of Thailand. It is held in Bangkok’s Sanam Luang Park, facing the King's Palace. The event is attended by as many as 300,000 Thai fight fans and admirers of the King.

Eight fighters compete in a one-day single-elimination style tournament. The Champion must win three fights all in one day.

The Kings Cup Super 8 Crown and Title Belt are donated by the King of Thailand.

The event lasts for one week with festivities in honor of the King such as Muay Thai demonstrations including an amateur tournament, Ladies Super 8, and a special youth demonstration.

After 2010, this tournament was no longer held under original conditions.

== Past winners ==
| Date | Weight | Champion | Event | Runner-up |
|---|---|---|---|---|
| 2010-12-05 | 72kg | (Thailand) Yodsanklai Fairtex | Kings Birthday 2010 | (Brazil) Cosmo Alexandre |
| 2009-12-05 | 72kg | (Brazil) Cosmo Alexandre | Kings Birthday 2009 | (Thailand) Mardsua Tum |
| 2008-12-05 | 72kg | (Thailand) Kem Sitsongpeenong | Kings Birthday 2008 | (Slovakia) Egon Racz |
| 2007-12-05 | 72kg | (Thailand) Mardsua Tum | Kings Birthday 2007 | (France) Jonathan Camara |
| 2006-12-05 | 72kg | (Thailand) Wanlop Sitpholek | Kings Birthday 2006 | (Russia) Dzhabar Askerov |
| 2005-12-05 | 72kg | (Thailand) Lamsongkram Chuwattana | Kings Birthday 2005 | (Thailand) Wanlop Sitpholek |
| 2004-12-05 | 72kg | (Thailand) Khunsuk Phetsupaphan | Kings Birthday 2004 | (Czech Republic) Michal Hangsut |
| 2003-12-05 | 72kg | (Thailand) Suriya Prasathinphimai | Kings Birthday 2003 | (France) Farid Villaume |
| 2002-12-05 | 72kg | (Philippines) Ole Laursen | Kings Birthday 2002 | (Sudan) Faisal Zakaria |
| 2001-12-05 | 72kg | (Australia) John Wayne Parr | Kings Birthday 2001 | (Portugal) Miguel Marques |
