= Stoliarenko =

Stoliarenko is a surname. Notable people with the surname include:

- Julija Stoliarenko (born 1993), Lithuanian mixed martial artist
- Mariia Stoliarenko (born 2004), Ukrainian badminton player
