= We're Not Really Strangers =

Card game

- Designers: Koreen Odiney
- Publishers: We’re Not Really Strangers
- Publication: 2018; 7 years ago
- Genres: Card game
- Players: 2–6
- Playing time: 15–30 minutes
- Age range: 15+

We're Not Really Strangers (WNRS) is a 2018 card game designed by Koreen Odiney which gained popularity over social media during the COVID-19 pandemic. Players answer personal questions from cards in order to deepen their connection to each other.

== Publishing history ==
We're Not Really Strangers was first published in November 2018 by photographer Koreen Odiney in order to "empower people to make meaningful connections." She credits the game's inspiration to a conversation with a stranger she had approached to photograph who said "[she] would write a book called we're not really strangers one day," and funded the game's development though her modelling.

=== Collaborations ===
The game has also collaborated with many luxury fashion brands to publish expansions and editions to the game, beginning in April 2020 with Coach. The partnership was promoted through the creation of Manhattan billboards with inspiring and uplifting messages. A similar promotion was done when WNRS published 25 new cards in collaboration with Valentino in January 2021. In March 2021, Odiney and Diane von Furstenberg, who had met over Instagram, released the Own It expansion pack to accompany Furstenberg's new book, Own It: The Secret to Life.

In August 2022, Deadline reported that film studio Steel Springs Pictures had partnered with WNRS to produce non-fiction and scripted series based on the game, exploring human emotion and connection as part of their new Non-Fiction division.

== Gameplay ==
Players take turns drawing a card and asking the question on it to another player, who answers it. Cards are divided between three levels (Perception, Connection, and Reflection) and a minimum of 15 question cards must be answered at a level before drawing cards from the next. If a wildcard is drawn, then all players must complete the instructions on it instead of answering a question. Once each level has been completed, players complete the instructions on the Final Card before ending the game.

== Reception ==
Mari Uyehara, writing for Wirecutter, described We're Not Really Strangers: Couples Edition as a "great wedding gift" as it "allow[s] for fun and meaningful reflection on the course of a relationship." In an article for Vogue, Moya Lothian-McLean wrote that those using WNRS as a shortcut to connection may be disappointed, concluding that "to create true emotional intimacy, at some point you have to stop hiding behind your cards and show them."

A number of celebrities, including Hailey Bieber, Penn Badgley, Noah Centineo, and Phil McGraw, publicly played or supported the game during the COVID-19 pandemic. As of June 2025, WNRS has accrued 5.3 million followers on Instagram and 5.7 followers on TikTok.
