= Nilmungkorn Sudsakorngym =

Thai Muay Thai fighter

- Born: Sisaket Province, Thailand
- Other names: Onyx Black Dragon; Nilmungkorn Fulkbameigiew
- Nationality: Thai
- Height: 1.83 m (6 ft 0 in)
- Weight: 85 kg (187 lb; 13 st)
- Division: Welterweight; Middleweight
- Style: Muay Thai
- Fighting out of: Pattaya, Thailand
- Team: Sudsakorn Muay Thai Gym
- Trainer: Sudsakorn Sor Klinmee

Kickboxing record
- Total: 100
- Wins: 75
- Losses: 21
- Draws: 4

Medal record

IMTF Men's Muaythai

Representing Thailand

IMTF World Championship
Winner	2015 Bangkok, Thailand	75kg

Nilmungkorn Sudsakorngym (Thai: นิลมังกร สุดสาครมวยไทยยิมส์) is a Thai Muay Thai fighter. As an amateur, he won the 2015 IMTF World Championship. In 2016 & 2017 as a professional, Nilmungkorn became the SUPER Muay Thai World Champion, winning the tournament two years in a row. In 2017, he also competed in Lethwei for the International Lethwei Federation Japan at Lethwei in Japan 4 in Tokyo.

== Biography ==
Nilmungkorn is born in the Sisaket Province in the north east of Thailand. He represents the Sudsakorn Muay Thai Gym in Pattaya and takes his name from his trainer Sudsakorn Sor Klinmee.

== Career ==
=== Muay Thai ===
In 2015, Nilmungkorn competed in the International Muay Thai Federation as an amateur and won the IMTF World Championship.

In 2015, Nilmungkorn faced French Muaythai star Jimmy Vienot at MAX Muay Thai in Bangkok. In the first round, Nilmungkorn landed a powerful elbow strike, flooring and opening the lip of Vienot, but the Frenchman came back strong in the second round knocking him out.

In 2016, Nilmungkorn was signed to SUPER Muaythai based in Bangkok. He competed and won the 75 kg tournament two years in a row (2016 & 2017).

=== Lethwei ===
In May 2017, Nilmungkorn was offered to face Dave Leduc for the ILFJ Openweight World Championship at Lethwei in Japan 4 in Tokyo, Japan. He replaced the previous challenger Cyrus Washington after he announced he was pulling out of the fight citing a hand injury. Nilmungkorn accepted to fight KO to win traditional Lethwei rules with no scoring system. Both fighters exchanged words at the pre-fight press conference, where Nilmungkorn stated that he will win the first Japanese Lethwei Belt, while Leduc was quoted saying he will finish Nilmungkorn quickly. Both fighters weighed-in at 79 kg. At Tokyo Dome City Hall, in the first round, Leduc landed a punch hitting Nilmungkorn on the jaw, forcing him to use his allowed time-out. Leduc won by knockout at 2:23sec of the second round.

== Championships and accomplishments ==
=== Championships ===
- SUPER Muay Thai
  - 2016 SUPER Muaythai Tournament Champion
  - 2017 SUPER Muaythai Tournament Champion
- Amateur
  - 2015 IMTF Muay Thai World championship (gold)

== Muay Thai record ==
Professional Muaythai record
75 wins (20 KOs), 21 losses, 4 draws
Date	Result	Opponent	Event	Location	Method	Round	Time
2024-04-06	Loss	(Iran) Mohammad Kia	Rajadamnern World Series	Bangkok, Thailand	Decision	3	
2017-04-17	Loss	(Thailand) Sammy Banchamek	Super Muay Thai	Thailand	KO	2	
2017-03-09	Win	(Morocco) Elias Emammuhamad	Super Muay Thai Tournament Final	Bangkok, Thailand	Decision	3	
Wins 2017 SUPER Muaythai 75kg Tournament
2017-02-11	Win	(United Kingdom) Charlie Guest	Super Muay Thai	Bangkok, Thailand	Decision	3	3:00
2016-04-1	Win	(Argentina) Juan Agustin	Super Muay Thai	Bangkok, Thailand	Decision	3	
2016-00-00	Win	(Canada) Matthew Richardson	Super Muay Thai	Bangkok, Thailand	Decision	3	3:00
2016-01-24	Win	(Turkey) Evrim Karagoz	Max Muay Thai Ultimate	Metz, France	KO	1	
2015-10-17	Loss	(France) Jimmy Vienot	Max Muay Thai	Pattaya, Thailand	KO	2	
2015-09-27	Loss	(England) Nicholas Jittigym	Max Muay Thai	Pattaya, Thailand	Decision	3	3:00
2015-03-06	Win	(Thailand) Thai opponent	Pattaya World Boxing Stadium	Pattaya, Thailand	KO	2	
Legend: Win Loss Draw/No contest Notes

== Kun Khmer record ==
Professional Kun Khmer record
0 wins (0 (T)KOs), 0 loss, 1 draws
Date	Result	Opponent	Event	Location	Method	Round	Time
2023-09-30	Win	(Nigeria) Emmanuel Onyedikachi	Wurkz Kun Khmer Championship	Phnom Penh, Cambodia	Decision	3	
Legend: Win Loss Draw/no contest Notes

== Lethwei record ==
Professional Lethwei record
0 wins (0 (T)KOs), 1 loss, 0 draw
Date	Result	Opponent	Event	Location	Method	Round	Time
2017-06-16	Loss	(Canada) Dave Leduc	Lethwei in Japan 4: Frontier	Tokyo, Japan	KO	2	2:23
For the ILFJ Openweight World Championship
Legend: Win Loss Draw/No contest Notes

== See also ==
- List of male kickboxers
- List of Lethwei fighters
- Sudsakorn Sor Klinmee
