= Too Too =

Burmese Lethwei fighter

- Born: Maung Too; 6 October 1990; Bu Kyun village, Yenanchaung city, Magway Region, Myanmar
- Died: 26 April 2023 (aged 32); Sagu city, Minbu District, Magway Region, Myanmar
- Native name: တူးတူး
- Height: 1.78 m (5 ft 10 in)
- Weight: 75 kg (165 lb; 11.8 st)
- Style: Lethwei
- Stance: Orthodox
- Team: Nagar Mahn, South Dagon, Yangon
- Trainer: Kyaw Soe

Other information
- Spouse: Ma Ei Ei Phyo (m. 2014)

Too Too (6 October 1990 – 26 April 2023; Burmese: တူးတူး) was a Burmese Lethwei fighter. He was the former WLC Middleweight World champion and was undefeated under traditional Lethwei rules, holding the 75 kg Lethwei Golden Belt from 2015 until his death in 2023. He also competed in a Lethwei superfight at Kunlun Fight 25 in Slovakia. Too Too died while in custody of the Burmese military known as the Tatmadaw on April 26, 2023.

== Career ==
In 2013, Too Too took part in the 2013 Southeast Asian Games and 2013 Asian Indoor and Martial Arts Games in Incheon, South Korea winning the gold and bronze medal respectively.

On 12 May 2013, Too Too faced former Golden belt champion Win Tun at Thuwunna Stadium. After landing a series of punches to the face and body, Too Too knocked out Win Tun in the third round.

On 27 November 2016, Too Too faced Peruvian Muay Thai fighter Mateo Celi at Thein Pyu Stadium winning the fight by KO.

On 6 January 2017, in Mandalay, Myanmar, Too Too faced world's ninth ranked Muay Thai fighter Chanajon P.K. Saenchai from Saenchai's gym, which ended in a draw.

In 2015, Too Too competed in a Lethwei superfight at Kunlun Fight 25 in Banská Bystrica, Slovakia. He faced Igor Danis at 75 kg in the event organized in partnership with Kunlun Fight and the Slovakia Lethwei Association. The event was billed as the European Premiere of Lethwei marking the first Lethwei fights hosted in Europe. Too Too dominated the match and inflicted heavy damage to his opponent. The match was ruled a draw under Traditional rules.

In July 2015, Too Too faced American Muay Thai fighter Cyrus Washington in the Monsoon Fighter event at Thein Pyu Stadium in Yangon. The match went for seven rounds rather than the sport's typical five. Too Too retained his undefeated record. The fight ended in a draw, but said he did not want to fight for this long again.

In August 2016, Too Too faced Quebecer fighter Dave Leduc at the 1st Myanmar Lethwei World Championship. During the fight, Leduc locked Too Too in a clinch and administered multiple blows to the head with his elbows and knees. Despite Leduc dominating the fight, Too Too remained standing to last out the five rounds resulting in a draw according to traditional Lethwei rules, knockout only to win, which necessitated a knockout to have a winner.

On 27 October 2016, Too Too competed in Lethwei Grand Prix Japan 2016, inaugurating the first event held by the ILFJ. The event took place at the Korakuen Hall in Tokyo, Japan and Too Too faced another Lethwei legend in Soe Lin Oo. With no knockout after five rounds, the bout was declared a draw according to traditional Lethwei rules.

In 2017, Too Too signed an exclusive contract with World Lethwei Championship. Despite being both among the top ranked Lethwei fighters in Myanmar and both signed to the WLC, Tun Tun Min and Too Too have refused to fight each other due to their long-lasting friendship.

In 2014, both men had fought each other under Muay Thai rules at Thai Fight in Thailand, with Tuhtaboyev winning by split decision. Since then, Too Too had been celebrated in his home country of Myanmar, winning the WLC Middleweight World Champion title in 2018. Meanwhile, Tuhtaboyev had been more focused on Muay Thai, having been involved in several big fights. In their rematch under Lethwei rules, the WLC Middleweight World Championship would be on the line.

As the reigning WLC Middleweight champion, Too Too received a challenge from a former opponent Naimjon Tuhtaboyev. On 31 January 2020, Too Too faced Naimjon Tuhtaboyev inside the Thein Pyu Stadium at WLC 11: Battlebones and the event was streamed live on UFC Fight Pass. Both fighters were eyeing a knockout, with Too Too being effective with his leg kicks and headbutts. However, judges gave Tuhtaboyev the victory via close split decision.

== Anti-coup protest, arrest and death ==
On 11 April 2022, Too Too was arrested for taking part in demonstrations against the 2021 Myanmar coup d'état at his home in Minbu Township in Myanmar’s Magway Region with weapons and explosives in his possession. Since February 2021, Too Too had been actively protesting and taking part in the anti-coup protests in Myanmar.

In April 2023, it was rumored that Too Too was shot and killed while trying to escape after being arrested and detained, but due to insufficient proof or witnesses it was never officially confirmed. On 13 July 2023, many Burmese news outlets reported Too Too's death after his friends broke the news on social media that his family had been informed about his death and that he had died in captivity on 26 April. It is believed that Too Too died 3 months prior on 26 April 2023 and was possibly tortured while in captivity of the military junta.

== Championships and accomplishments ==
Championships

- Lethwei World Champion
  - 75 kg Lethwei Golden Belt
- World Lethwei Championship
  - WLC Middleweight World Championship

Other championships

- 2019 Air KBZ Fight Championship Champion
- 2013 Dagon Shwe Aung Lan Tournament Champion
- (gold) 2012 Asian Muay Championships - Ho Chi Minh City
- (gold) 2013 Dagon Shwe Aung Lan tournament - Yangon
- (gold) 2013 Prime Minister's Cup - Naypyidaw

Muay Thai

- (gold) 2013 Southeast Asian Games - Naypyidaw, Myanmar
- (bronze) 2013 Asian Indoor Martial Arts Games - Incheon, South Korea

== Lethwei record ==
Professional Lethwei record
66 Fights, 39 wins (34 (T)KOs), 1 loss, 26 draws
Date	Result	Opponent	Event	Location	Method	Round	Time
2020-01-31	Loss	(Uzbekistan) Naimjon Tuhtaboyev	WLC 11: Battlebones	Yangon, Myanmar	Decision	5	
Lost WLC Middleweight World Championship
2019-11-03	Win	(Japan) Tokeshi Kohei	Air KBZ Fight 6	Yangon, Myanmar	KO	4	
Wins Air KBZ Lethwei Championship
2019-08-18	Draw	(Brazil) Fabio Ferrari	Myanmar Lethwei World Championship 2019	Yangon, Myanmar	Draw	5	
2019-04-14	Win	(Thailand) Dechrid Sathian Muaythai Gym	Thingyan Fight Chitthu Myaing Park	Hpa-an, Myanmar	KO	1	
2018-02-17	Win	(Ukraine) Vasyl Sorokin	WLC 4: Bare-knuckle King	Naypyidaw, Myanmar	Decision	5	
2017-11-04	Win	(Australia) Louis Michael Badato	WLC 3: Legendary Champions	Yangon, Myanmar	Decision	5	
Wins WLC Middleweight World Championship
2017-06-10	Win	(France) James Benal	WLC 2: Ancient Warriors	Yangon, Myanmar	Decision	5	
2017-03-03	Win	(Australia) Eddie Farrell	WLC 1: The Great Beginning	Yangon, Myanmar	Decision	5	
2017-01-06	Draw	(Thailand) Chanajon PK Saenchai	Myanmar-Thailand-Laos Challenge Fights	Mandalay, Myanmar	Draw	5	
2016-11-27	Win	(Peru) Matteo Celi	Mandalay Rumbling Challenge Fight	Yangon, Myanmar	KO	3	
2016-10-27	Draw	(Myanmar) Soe Lin Oo	Lethwei Grand Prix in Japan 2016	Tokyo, Japan	Draw	5	
2016-10-09	Win	(Thailand) Berneung Topkingboxing	GTG International Challenge Fights 2016	Yangon, Myanmar	KO	3	
2016-08-21	Draw	(Canada) Dave Leduc	Myanmar Lethwei World Championship 2016	Yangon, Myanmar	Draw	5	
2016-04-02	Win	(Russia) Artem Sushkov	Max Thingyan Fight	Yangon, Myanmar	KO	4	
2016-02-03	Win	(Russia) Vladimir Shuliak	Win Sein Taw Ya 2016	Mudon, Myanmar	KO	3	
2016-01-13	Win	(Myanmar) Kyal Linn Aung	25th Karen New Year festival	Hpa-an, Myanmar	KO	5	
2015-09-27	Draw	(Myanmar) Saw Gaw Mu Do	Mandalay Rumbling Mega Fights	Yangon, Myanmar	Draw	5	
2015-08-30	Win	(Canada) Matthew Richardson	All Star Big Fight	Yangon, Myanmar	KO	4	
2015-07-26	Draw	(United States) Cyrus Washington	Monsoon Fight	Yangon, Myanmar	Draw	7	
2015-05-15	Draw	(Slovakia) Igor Danis	Kunlun Fight 25	Banská Bystrica, Slovakia	Draw	5	
2015-04-03	Draw	(Thailand) Petchtae Tor.Maxmuaythai	Mon-Myanmar-Thai Challenge Fights	Ye Township, Myanmar	Draw	5	
2015-03-25	Draw	(Myanmar) Soe Lin Oo	Thaung Pyin Lethwei Challenge Fights	Ye Township, Myanmar	Draw	5	
2015-02-06	Draw	(Myanmar) Saw Yan Paing	Taungbon village 68th Mon National Day	Ye Township, Myanmar	Draw	5	
2014-12-28	Win	(United States) Edward	International Letwhay Challenge Fights	Yangon, Myanmar	KO	3	
2014-11-02	Win	(Brazil) Matheus Robin	One on One International Challenge Fight	Yangon, Myanmar	KO	3	
2014-08-17	Draw	(Myanmar) Saw Nga Man	Mandalay Rumbling Champion Challenge	Yangon, Myanmar	Draw	5	
Official challenge for the Openweight Golden Belt
2014-07-06	Draw	(Thailand) Petchtae Tor.Maxmuaythai	Myanmar vs. Thailand Challenge Fights	Yangon, Myanmar	Draw	5	
2014-06-01	Draw	(Myanmar) Soe Lin Oo	Lethwei Challenge Fights	Yangon, Myanmar	Draw	5	
2014-04-13	Draw	(Myanmar) Kyal Linn Aung	Thaung Pyin Lethwei Challenge Fights	Ye Township, Myanmar	Draw	5	
2014-03-30	Draw	(Thailand) Rachenlek Maesotmuaythai	Kalaw Thaw village Challenge Fights	Mudon, Myanmar	Draw	5	
2014-03-15	Win	(Thailand) Yodtang	Lamaing town Challenge Fights	Ye Township, Myanmar	KO	5	
2014-02-14	Win	(Thailand) Yodkunkrai Por.Wiriya	Shwe Sa Daw Challenge Fights	Ye, Mon State, Myanmar	KO	3	
2014-01-26	Draw	(Thailand) Wanchana Hua Hin	Win Sein Taw Ya 2014	Mudon, Myanmar	Draw	5	
2013-05-12	Win	(Myanmar) Win Tun	Lethwei Challenge Fights	Yangon, Myanmar	KO	3	
2013-03	Win	(Myanmar) Daung Thi Chae	Lamaing town Challenge Fights	Ye Township, Myanmar	KO		
2013-02-17	Win	(Myanmar) Thutti Aung	Lethwei Challenge Fights	Yangon, Myanmar	KO		
2013-02-05	Win	(Thailand) Rajchasie	Win Sein Taw Ya 2013	Mudon, Myanmar	KO	4	
2013-01-20	Win	(Thailand) Petpakai	Myanmar vs. Thailand Challenge Fights	Yangon, Myanmar	TKO		
2013-01-06	Win	(Myanmar) Phoe Thar Gyi	Dagon Shwe Aung Lan 2013 final	Yangon, Myanmar	Decision	5	
2012-12-23	Win	(Myanmar) Tha Pyay Nyo	Dagon Shwe Aung Lan 2013 semi-final	Yangon, Myanmar	KO	2	
2012-12-16	Win	(Myanmar) Kyan Sit Aung	Dagon Shwe Aung Lan 2013 quarter-final	Yangon, Myanmar	KO		
2012-10-28	Win	(Myanmar) Wunna	Magway Challenge Fights	Magway, Myanmar	KO	2	
2012-09-23	Draw	(Myanmar) Dawna Aung	Aung Myay Mandalar Indoor Stadium	Mandalay, Myanmar	Draw	5	
2012-05-04	Draw	(Myanmar) Tha Pyay Nyo	Kaytumadi Indoor Stadium	Taungoo, Myanmar	Draw	5	
2011	Draw	(Myanmar) Dawna Aung	Lamaing town Challenge Fights	Ye Township, Myanmar	Draw	5	
2011-12-24	Win	(Myanmar) Mondaing	Karen New Year 2751 Insein Township	Yangon, Myanmar	KO		
2011-11-06	Draw	(Myanmar) Dawna Aung	Myanmar vs. Australia Lethwei Challenge Fights	Yangon, Myanmar	Draw	5	
2011-09-18	Draw	(Myanmar) Shwe Moe Kaung	Champion Challenge Cup Tournament	Myitkyina, Myanmar	Draw	5	
2011-08-14	Draw	(Myanmar) Kyan Sit Aung	Myanmar-Japan Goodwill Letwhay Challenge Fights (Day 1)	Yangon, Myanmar	Draw	5	
2011	Draw	(Myanmar) Tun Tun Min	Lethwei Challenge Fights	Myanmar	Draw	5	
2011	Draw	(Myanmar) Pe Pyar Maung Maung	Lethwei Challenge Fights	Myanmar	Draw		
2011-05-04	Win	(Myanmar) Shan Thway Lay	Kaytumadi Indoor Stadium	Taungoo, Myanmar	KO		
2010-12-31	Draw	(Myanmar) Thar Chaung Thar	Lethwei Challenge Fights	Yangon, Myanmar	Draw	4	
2010-11-21	Win	(Myanmar) Shwe Kyar Phyu	Kaytumadi Indoor Stadium	Taungoo, Myanmar	KO	1	
2010	Draw	(Myanmar) Ko U Lay	Lethwei Challenge Fights	Myanmar	Draw	4	
Legend: Win Loss Draw/No contest Notes

== Muay Thai record ==
Muay Thai record
7 wins, 2 losses, 0 draws
Date	Result	Opponent	Event	Location	Method	Round	Time
2014-10-25	Loss	(Uzbekistan) Naimjon Tuhtaboyev	Thai Fight Kard Chuek	Bangkok, Thailand	Decision	3	3:00
2013-12-22	Win	(Thailand) Panupan Tanjad	2013 SEA Games	Naypyidaw, Myanmar	Decision	3	3:00
2013-12-19	Win	(Laos) Nouna Ngeumsangouane	2013 SEA Games	Naypyidaw, Myanmar	Decision	3	3:00
2013-07-01	Loss	(Iran) Masoud Minaei	2013 Asian Indoor and Martial Arts Games	Incheon, South Korea	Decision	3	3:00
2013-06-30	Win	(South Korea) Son Jun-heok	2013 Asian Indoor and Martial Arts Games	Incheon, South Korea	Decision	3	3:00
2013-06-29	Win	(Syria) Salar Al-Mouead	2013 Asian Indoor and Martial Arts Games	Incheon, South Korea	Decision	3	3:00
Legend: Win Loss Draw/No contest Notes

Awards and achievements
New championship	WLC Middleweight World Champion; 4 November 2017 – 31 January 2020	Succeeded by Naimjon Tuhtaboyev
