= 2017 in ILFJ =

Information
- First date: February 16, 2017
- Last date: November 15, 2017

Events
- Total events: 5

Fights
- Total fights: 31

The year 2017 was the second year in the history of the ILFJ, a Japanese Lethwei promotion and the year started with Lethwei in Japan 2: Legacy. The events are streamed online by FITE TV, Abema TV in Japan and through television agreements with MNTV in Myanmar.

== List of events ==
#	Event	Date	Venue	Location	Attendance
1	Lethwei in Japan 2: Legacy	February 16, 2017	Korakuen Hall	Tokyo, Japan	
2	Lethwei in Japan 3: Grit	April 18, 2017	Korakuen Hall	Tokyo, Japan	
3	Lethwei in Japan 4: Frontier	June 16, 2017	Tokyo Dome City Hall	Tokyo, Japan	
4	Lethwei in Japan 5: Nexurise	September 28, 2017	Korakuen Hall	Tokyo, Japan	
5	Lethwei Grand Prix Japan 2017	November 15, 2017	Korakuen Hall	Tokyo, Japan	

== Lethwei in Japan 2: Legacy ==
Lethwei in Japan 2: Legacy
- Promotion: ILFJ
- Date: February 16, 2017
- Venue: Korakuen Hall
- City: Tokyo, Japan

Event chronology
Lethwei Grand Prix Japan 2016	Lethwei in Japan 2: Legacy	Lethwei in Japan 3: Grit

Lethwei in Japan 2: Legacy was a Lethwei event held on February 16, 2017 at the Korakuen Hall in Tokyo, Japan.

=== Background ===
This event featured recently crowned openweight Lethwei World Champion Dave Leduc defending his title for the first time against Lethwei veteran Phoe Kay.

For his Lethwei debut, Japanese WPMF kickboxing champion Kouma faced young Myanmar fighter Yar Zar, while Thar Thae Ta Pwint was against Japanese Karate Champion Yuki Yamamoto.

=== Results ===
Lethwei in Japan 2: Legacy
Weight Class				Method	Round	Time	Notes
Bantamweight 54 kg	(Myanmar) Yar Zar	-	(Japan) Kouma Shimizu	Draw	5	5:00	
Openweight 80 kg	(Canada) Dave Leduc	def.	(Myanmar) Phoe Kay	KO	2	2:32	4 knockdowns during the match
Welterweight 70 kg	(Myanmar) Phyan Thwe	def.	(Japan) Yasuyuki Yamazaki	TKO	1	1:33	3 knockdowns during one round
Welterweight 70 kg	(Myanmar) Shan Ko	def.	(Japan) Keisuke Okuda	TKO (punches)	3	3:00	Doctor stoppage (Cut)
Featherweight 64 kg	(Myanmar) Shwe Sin Min	-	(Japan) Nanae Takahashi	Draw	4	3:00	
Featherweight 68 kg	(Myanmar) Thar Thae Ta Pwint	def.	(Japan) Yuki Yamamoto	TKO	1	2:19	

== Lethwei in Japan 3: Grit ==
Lethwei in Japan 3 : Grit
- Promotion: ILFJ
- Date: April 18, 2017
- Venue: Korakuen Hall
- City: Tokyo, Japan

Event chronology
Lethwei in Japan 2: Legacy	Lethwei in Japan 3 : Grit	Lethwei in Japan 4: Frontier

Lethwei in Japan 3: Grit was a Lethwei event held on April 18, 2017 at the Korakuen Hall in Tokyo, Japan.

=== Background ===
For his second title defence, openweight Lethwei World Champion Dave Leduc faced Turkish Australian Adem Yilmaz in traditional Lethwei rules. This match was the first Lethwei world title fight headlining two non-Burmese in the sport's history. For the occasion, the Ambassador of Myanmar to Japan was present at the event held in the Korakuen Hall. This event also marked the return to action of former Openweight World Champion Saw Nga Man against Japanese fighter Teruhiko Kubo.

=== Results ===
Lethwei in Japan 3: Grit
Weight Class				Method	Round	Time	Notes
Openweight 80 kg	(Canada) Dave Leduc	-	(Australia) Adem Yilmaz	Draw	5	3:00	
Featherweight 69 kg	(Myanmar) Thar Thae Ta Pwint	def.	(Japan) Hikaru Hasumi	TKO	2	1:18	
Featherweight 69 kg	(Myanmar) Phyan Thwe	-	(United States) Arana	Draw	5	3:00	
Bantamweight 56 kg	(Myanmar) Yuta Hamamoto	-	(Myanmar) Tain Tike	Draw	5	3:00	
Openweight 80 kg	(Myanmar) Saw Nga Man	def.	(Japan) Teruhiko Kubo	TKO	1	2:13	Cut on right eye
Bantamweight 60 kg	(Myanmar) Kyar Bar Hein	def.	(United States) Cody Moberly	TKO	2	0:45	

== Lethwei in Japan 4: Frontier ==
Lethwei in Japan 4: Frontier
- Promotion: ILFJ
- Date: June 6, 2017
- Venue: Tokyo Dome City Hall
- City: Tokyo, Japan

Event chronology
Lethwei in Japan 3: Grit	Lethwei in Japan 4: Frontier	Lethwei in Japan 5: Nexurise

Lethwei in Japan 4: Frontier was a Lethwei event held on June 16, 2017 at the Tokyo Dome City Hall in Tokyo, Japan.

=== Background ===
This event featured the rematch of Thar Thae Ta Pwint vs Hikaru Hasumi. Thara The Ta Pwint ultimately won the first and second exchanged grabbing the ILFJ World Title. Also Openweight Champion Dave Leduc was supposed to face American champion Cyrus Washington, but Washington pulled out of the fight citing a hand injury he sustained in training. Leduc eventually defended his title for the third time against Muaythai world champion Nilmungkorn Sudsakorngym, winning the ILFJ Openweight world title.

=== Results ===
Lethwei in Japan 4: Frontier
Weight Class				Method	Round	Time	Notes
Openweight 80 kg	(Canada) Dave Leduc	def.	(Thailand) Nilmungkorn Sudsakorngym	KO	2	2:23	For the ILFJ Openweight World Championship
Featherweight 65 kg	(Myanmar) Thar Thae Ta Pwint	def.	(Japan) Hikaru Hasumi	TKO	3	2:28	
Bantamweight 57 kg	(Japan) Yuta Hamamoto	def.	(Myanmar) Yar Zar	KO	3	0:42	For the ILFJ Bantamweight World Championship
Welterweight 70 kg	(Myanmar) Phyan Thwe	def.	(Japan) Kouhei Tokeshi	TKO (doctor stoppage)	4		
Featherweight 64 kg	(Myanmar) Vero Nika	-	(Japan) Nanae Takahashi	Draw	3	3:00	
Featherweight 61 kg	(Lithuania) Julija Stoliarenko	def.	(Myanmar) Su Hlaing Oo	KO	2	1:32	
Bantamweight 60 kg	(Myanmar) Kyar Ba Hein	-	(Japan) BAKI	Draw	4		

== Lethwei in Japan 5: Nexurise ==
Lethwei in Japan 5: Nexurise
- Promotion: ILFJ
- Date: September 28, 2017
- Venue: Korakuen Hall
- City: Tokyo, Japan

Event chronology
Lethwei in Japan 4: Frontier	Lethwei in Japan 5: Nexurise	Lethwei Grand Prix Japan 2017

Lethwei in Japan 5: Nexurise was a Lethwei event held on September 28, 2017 at the Korakuen Hall in Tokyo, Japan.

=== Background ===
For unknown reasons, Hanthar Waddy replaced Tun Lwin Moe. Muaythai Champion and Lethwei veteran Pravit Sakmuangtalang, also known by his last name Aor Piriyapinyo faced Thar Thae Ta Pwint. Former Golden Belt Champion, Win Tun came out of retirement for this fight and this event marked the implementation of weight classes like in traditional tournaments.

=== Results ===
Lethwei in Japan 5: Nexurise
Weight Class				Method	Round	Time	Notes
Bantamweight 60 kg	(Myanmar) Hanthar Waddy Thar	-	(Japan) Makoto	Draw	5	3:00	
Openweight 100 kg	(Japan) YABU	def.	(Australia) Hartley Jackson	TKO	3	0:53	
Featherweight 65 kg	(Myanmar) Thar Thae Ta Pwint	-	(Thailand) Pravit Sakmuangtalang	Draw	5	3:00	
Welterweight 70 kg	(Myanmar) Phyan Thwe	def.	(Japan) Hareruya	TKO	1	0:34	
Welterweight 70 kg	(Myanmar) Yan Naing Aung	def.	(Japan) Tokeshi Kohei	TKO	5	2:31	
Featherweight 65 kg	(Myanmar) Win Tun	-	(Japan) Hasumi Hikaru	Draw	5	3:00	

== Lethwei Grand Prix Japan 2017 ==
Lethwei Grand Prix Japan 2017
- Promotion: ILFJ
- Date: November 15, 2017
- Venue: Tokyo Dome City Hall, Japan
- City: Tokyo, Japan

Event chronology
Lethwei in Japan 5: Nexurise	Lethwei Grand Prix Japan 2017	Lethwei in Japan 7: Yuki

Lethwei Grand Prix Japan 2017 was a Lethwei event held on November 15, 2017 at the Korakuen Hall in Tokyo, Japan.

=== Background ===
Openweight champion Dave Leduc was scheduled to be on this card but due to his opponent backing out, the fight was canceled. MMA veteran Daryl Lokuku made his successful Lethwei debut. Yan Naing Aung and Tokeshi Kohei rematched after facing each other at the September event. Julija Stoliarenko faced top Lethwei fighter in Veronika and ultimately won the Japan Lethwei World Title.

=== Results ===
Lethwei Grand Prix Japan 2017
Weight Class				Method	Round	Time	Notes
Featherweight 63 kg	(Myanmar) Tun Lwin Moe	-	(Japan) Higashi Shuhei	Draw	5	3:00	
Featherweight 65 kg	(Myanmar) Pat Kyaw Lin Naing	def.	(Japan) Hasumi Hikaru	TKO	3	3:00	
Welterweight 70 kg	(Myanmar) Yan Naing Aung	-	(Japan) Tokeshi Kohei	Draw	5	3:00	
Openweight 80 kg	(Democratic Republic of the Congo) Daryl Lokuku	def.	(Japan) Teruhiko Kubo	KO	1	2:58	
Welterweight 72 kg	(Myanmar) Soe Htet Oo	-	(South Korea) Do Hyung Kwon	Draw	4	3:00	
Featherweight 62 kg	(Lithuania) Julija Stoliarenko	def.	(Myanmar) Vero Nika	TKO	2	0:45	For the ILFJ Women's Featherweight World Championship

== See also ==
- 2017 in K-1
- 2017 in Kunlun Fight
- 2017 in World Lethwei Championship
