= Brian Lam =

American writer (born 1977)

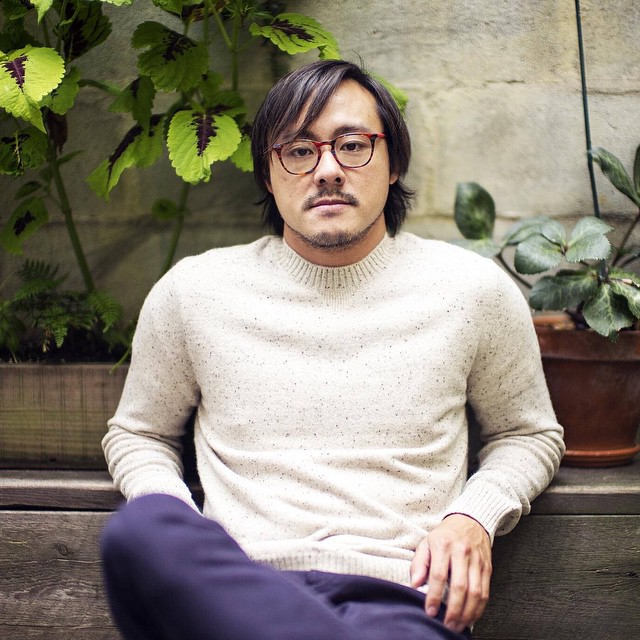
- photographed by Christopher Michel (2014)
- Born: May 23, 1977 (age 49); New York City, U.S.
- Education: Boston University
- Occupations: writer, journalist, reviewer, blogger
- Years active: 2003–2016
- Known for: Gizmodo (editor); Wirecutter (founder)

Brian Lam (born May 23, 1977) is an American writer, best known for his work with Gizmodo, a blog focusing on technology; and The Wirecutter, a recommendation website for gadgets.

== Early life and education ==
Lam's parents are ethnically Chinese; his mother was born and raised in Queens and his father is an immigrant from Hong Kong. Lam was born in New York City but moved to the suburbs of New Jersey after his father, a computer engineer for Hewlett Packard, surprised a burglar who was taking their television. Lam was not fond of his time in New Jersey, noting that his preferences are for "deep urban-ness, or I'm into nature, but I'm not into this gray mushy zone in between, that's kind of what the suburbs were for me."

As a child, Lam recalled his parents "[let me and my brothers] do whatever we wanted to. It's reflected in the professions of all my brothers. One of my brothers is a musician. Another brother is a furniture maker. That has led to us having not a ton of guidance or structure" but his parents applied pressure "[to] be myself and do what I wanted to do. It's a lot of responsibility to listen to what yourself and find out what's right for you, without anyone programming you for that." When he was 11 or 12, he began spending summers with his grandparents in Hong Kong, where he discovered the local gadgets were "a lot smaller, cheaper, and better." While attending Boston University, he switched majors frequently, taking courses in Philosophy, English, Journalism, Photojournalism, Computer Science, and Business, ending up in business school, after hearing dire stories about the decline of printed news.

After college, Lam moved to San Francisco to work at a small web-development firm in 2000, but was laid off within two months after the dot-com bubble burst. He then worked at a kickboxing gym he had joined, which was operated by Alex Gong; Lam was present when Gong was shot and killed in 2003 after pursuing a hit-and-run driver that had damaged his car. Lam recalled that he discovered persistence after Gong's death: "I would just work so hard and I got whatever job I wanted eventually, even if I had to apply a few times." This attitude led him to internships at Maximum PC and later Wired.

== Career ==
Lam was a contributor and assistant editor for two years at Wired magazine before he left to join Gizmodo in 2006 as editor. Gizmodo page views per month increased from 11 million to 42 million in the twelve months following his hiring in July 2006. His apartment in San Francisco served as Gizmodo's headquarters in the city. Lam became editorial director in 2008 and left Gizmodo in 2011, by which time Gizmodo was receiving more than 220 million page views per month. During his time at Gizmodo, that site obtained and published a story about the iPhone 4 prototype in 2010. Lam was called personally by Steve Jobs, who asked for the prototype to be returned, but Gizmodo held out until the prototype was officially recognized by Apple as its property. Lam noted the resulting confrontation ultimately led to his disillusionment with and departure from Gizmodo.

Later in 2011, Lam started The Wirecutter, a blog that gave buying recommendations for gadgets. Founding Wirecutter allowed Lam the time to pursue personal interests with The Scuttlefish, a blog he curated with friends, posting stories about the ocean and aquatic pursuits. In 2013, he started The Sweethome, a similar recommendation website for household goods. By 2015, The Wirecutter generated US$150 million in e-commerce sales, and the sites had drawn attention for their influential business model: rather than earning money primarily by publishing and updating content frequently to drive site traffic, pageviews, and advertising, they used affiliate links to earn a fraction of the resulting sale. In 2016, The Wirecutter and The Sweethome were acquired by The New York Times Company for more than US$30 million. At the time of the acquisition, The Wirecutter had a staff of roughly 60 employees. In January 2017, The New York Times announced that David Perpich would assume leadership at The Wirecutter as of March 5.
