= Naimjon Tuhtaboyev =

Uzbek Lethwei and Muay Thai fighter (born 1993)

- Born: January 29, 1993 (age 33); Tashkent, Uzbekistan
- Native name: Naimjon Tuxtaboyev
- Height: 1.80 m (5 ft 11 in)
- Weight: 75 kg (165 lb; 11.8 st)
- Style: Muay Thai, Lethwei
- Stance: Orthodox
- Team: Tiger Muaythai

Kickboxing record
- Total: 78
- Wins: 64
- Losses: 13
- Draws: 1

Naimjon Tuhtaboyev (Uzbek: Naimjon Tuxtaboyev; born 29 January 1993) is an Uzbek Muay Thai and Lethwei fighter. He formerly fought in the World Lethwei Championship (WLC), where he was the final WLC Middleweight World champion.

Tuhtaboyev became the WLC champion by winning a decision against Too Too at WLC 11: Battlebones in Yangon, Myanmar.

== Career ==
=== Muay Thai career ===
On April 19, 2013, Tuhtaboyev faced Muay Thai champion Yodsanklai Fairtex and lost by TKO in the second round two at Thai Fight Extreme 2013: Pattaya.

On July 24, 2013, Tuhtaboyev took part in the 2013 Toyota Vigo Marathon 140 lbs Tournament in Phitsanulok, Thailand. In the Tournament Quarter Finals, he defeated Leonard Nganga of Kenya by decision. Advancing to the Semi Final round, he defeated John Michel Pierre via second-round technical knockout. In the Tournament Final, he faced the Muay Thai legend Saenchai, to whom he lost in a three-round decision.

Naimjon Tuhtaboyev returned to Thai Fight on October 27, 2013, where he faced Christophe Pruvost of Switzerland at Thai Fight Kard Chuek. Tuhtaboyev went on to lose by decision after three rounds.

On September 20, 2014, he faced former Isuzu Cup tournament winner Chanajon P.K. Saenchai Muaythaigym at Thai Fight World Battle 2014: Vietnam in Ho Chi Minh City. The Uzbek picked up his first win in Thai Fight as he knocked out Chanajon in the first round with a spinning back elbow.

On October 25, 2014, Naimjon Tuhtaboyev faced Burmese Lethwei fighter Too Too under Muay Thai rules in a fight where the Uzbek narrowly won by way of a three-round decision.

Tuhtaboyev returned to Thai Fight on October 23, 2016 at Thai Fight Air Race 1 to face Sean Kearney of Canada. He lost the fight via three-round decision.

On December 23, 2017, he defeated Mohamed Houmer of France by knockout at Thai Fight Chiang Mai in the 2017 Thai Fight 70 kg Tournament Semi-Finals.

Naimjon Tuhtaboyev went on to face Saensatharn P.K. Saenchai Muaythaigym at Thai Fight Bangkok on January 27, 2018 in the 70 kg Tournament Final. The fight was to determine the 2017 Thai Fight 70 kg Champion. However, after three rounds, he lost by decision.

On March 30, 2019, Tuhtaboyev faced Chanajon P.K. Saenchai Muaythaigym at Thai Fight Mueang Khon 2019 in a rematch of their fight from 2014. This time, Chanajon won the fight by decision.

=== Lethwei career ===
On October 14, 2018, Tuhtaboyev impressed in his Lethwei debut with a dominant draw against Phyan Thway. Phyan Thway, who was known for having difficulties in cutting weight, looked significantly lighter than Tuhtaboyev. His performance caught the attention of the World Lethwei Championship (WLC) and in 2019, Tuhtaboyev signed an exclusive Lethwei contract with he promotion. Tuhtaboyev challenged undefeated, reigning WLC Middleweight Champion Too Too. On October 25, 2014, both men had fought each other under Muay Thai rules at Thai Fight in Thailand, with Tuhtaboyev emerging victorious by split decision. Since then, Too Too had been celebrated in his home country of Myanmar, winning the WLC Middleweight title in 2018. Meanwhile, Tuhtaboyev had been more focused on Muay Thai, having been involved in several big fights. In their Lethwei rematch, the WLC Middleweight World Championship would be on the line.

On January 31, 2020, Tuhtaboyev faced Too Too inside the Thein Pyu Stadium, with the event being streamed live on UFC Fight Pass. Both fighters were looking for the knockout, with Too Too being effective with his leg kicks and headbutts. However, Tuhtaboyev's more precise and accurate strikes proved to be the difference and earned him the victory via close split decision and he became the WLC Middleweight World Champion.

== Championships and accomplishments ==
=== Lethwei ===
- World Lethwei Championship
  - WLC Middleweight World Championship

=== Muay Thai ===
- Thai Fight
  - 2017 Thai Fight 70kg Tournament Runner-Up
- Bangla Stadium
  - 2017 Bangla Stadium Middleweight Championship
- Toyota Vigo Marathon
  - 2013 Toyota Vigo Marathon 63.5 kg Tournament Runner-Up

== Lethwei record ==
Lethwei record
1 wins, 0 loss, 1 draw
Date	Result	Opponent	Event	Location	Method	Round	Time
2020-01-31	Win	(Myanmar) Too Too	WLC 11: Battlebones	Yangon, Myanmar	Decision (Split)	5	3:00
Wins WLC Middleweight World Championship
2019-11-03	Draw	(Myanmar) Phyan Thway	AH-GA Golden Belt Championship	Yangon, Myanmar	Draw	5	3:00
Legend: Win Loss Draw/No contest Notes

== Muay Thai record ==
Muay Thai record
64 Wins, 13 Losses, 1 Draws
Date	Result	Opponent	Event	Location	Method	Round	Time
2019-07-20	Win	(Turkey) Ismail Uzuner	Pitbull Promotion	Istanbul, Turkey	Decision	3	3:00
2019-04-13	Win	(Malaysia) Name unknown	DJ Harris International Muaythai 2019	Kelantan, Malaysia	KO	2	
2019-03-30	Loss	(Thailand) Chanajon P.K. Saenchai Muaythaigym	Thai Fight Mueang Khon 2019	Nakhon Si Thammarat, Thailand	Decision	3	3:00
2018-07-01	Loss	(Thailand) Pakorn P.K. Saenchai Muaythaigym	8 Super Champ	Bangkok, Thailand	Decision	3	3:00
2018-05-26	Win	(China) Shun Xu	Heroes Fighting Championship	Macau	Decision	3	3:00
2018-01-27	Loss	(Thailand) Saensatharn P.K. Saenchai Muaythaigym	Thai Fight Bangkok 2017	Bangkok, Thailand	Decision	3	3:00
For the 2017 Thai Fight 70kg title.
2017-12-23	Win	(France) Mohamed Houmer	Thai Fight Chiang Mai 2017	Chang Mai, Thailand	KO	1	2:45
2017-11-29	Win	(Thailand) Kiatchai Phuket Top Team	Bangla Boxing Stadium	Phuket, Thailand	KO	3	
Wins Bangla Boxing Stadium Middleweight Belt
2016-10-23	Loss	(Canada) Sean Kearney	Thai Fight Air Race 1	Bangkok, Thailand	Decision	3	3:00
2014-10-25	Win	(Myanmar) Too Too	Thai Fight 2014: 1st Round	Bangkok, Thailand	Decision	3	3:00
2014-09-20	Win	(Thailand) Chanajon P.K. Saenchai Muaythaigym	Thai Fight World Battle 2014: Vietnam	Ho Chi Minh City, Vietnam	KO	1	
2014-03-29	Loss	(Thailand) Jomthong Chuwattana	MAX Muay Thai 7	Bangkok, Thailand	Decision	3	3:00
2013-10-27	Loss	(Switzerland) Christopne Pruvost	Thai Fight Kard Chuek	Bangkok, Thailand	Decision	3	3:00
2013-10-17	Loss	(Brazil) Matheus Robin	Mega Fight - The Extreme 8	Hong Kong	Decision	3	3:00
2013-07-24	Loss	(Thailand) Saenchai	Toyota Vigo Marathon Tournament, Final	Phitsanulok, Thailand	Decision	3	3:00
For Toyota Vigo Marathon Tournament Super Lightweight (140lbs) title
2013-07-24	Win	(France) John Michel Pierre	Toyota Vigo Marathon Tournament, Semi Finals	Phitsanulok, Thailand	TKO	2	
2013-07-24	Win	(Kenya) Leonard Nganga	Toyota Vigo Marathon Tournament, Quarter Finals	Phitsanulok, Thailand	Decision	3	300
2013-04-19	Loss	(Thailand) Yodsanklai Fairtex	Thai Fight Extreme 2013: Pattaya	Pattaya, Thailand	TKO	2	
Legend: Win Loss Draw/No contest Notes

Awards and achievements
Preceded by Too Too	WLC Middleweight World Champion; January 31, 2020 – February 1, 2021; WLC defunct due to 2021 Myanmar coup d'état
