= UFC Fight Night: Dolidze vs. Imavov =

2024 mixed martial event in Nevada, US

- The poster for UFC Fight Night: Dolidze vs. Imavov
- Promotion: Ultimate Fighting Championship
- Date: February 3, 2024
- Venue: UFC Apex
- City: Enterprise, Nevada, United States
- Attendance: Not announced

Event chronology
UFC 297: Strickland vs. du Plessis	UFC Fight Night: Dolidze vs. Imavov	UFC Fight Night: Hermansson vs. Pyfer

UFC Fight Night: Dolidze vs. Imavov (also known as UFC Fight Night 235, UFC on ESPN+ 93 and UFC Vegas 85) was a mixed martial arts event produced by the Ultimate Fighting Championship that took place on February 3, 2024, at the UFC Apex facility, in Enterprise, Nevada, part of the Las Vegas Metropolitan Area, United States.

== Background ==
A middleweight bout between Roman Dolidze and Nassourdine Imavov headlined the event.

A flyweight bout between Nate Maness and Azat Maksum was expected to take place at the event. However, Maness pulled out in early January due to injury and was replaced by former LFA Flyweight Champion Charles Johnson.

William Gomis was expected to face Melsik Baghdasaryan in a featherweight bout at this event. However, Gomis pulled out due to undisclosed reasons in early January and the bout was scrapped.

Kiefer Crosbie and Themba Gorimbo were scheduled to meet in a welterweight bout. However on January 5, it was announced that Crosbie pulled out due to an injury. Pete Rodriguez was announced as the replacement.

A welterweight bout between Muslim Salikhov and Randy Brown took place at the event. The pairing was previously scheduled to meet at UFC 296 last December, but Brown withdrew due to illness.

At the weigh-ins, Luana Carolina weighed in at 128 pounds, two pounds over the women's flyweight non-title fight limit. Her bout proceeded at catchweight with Carolina forfeiting an 20 percentage of her purse, which went to her opponent former Invicta FC Bantamweight Champion Julija Stoliarenko.

== Results ==
Fight card (ESPN+)
Weight class				Method	Round	Time	Notes
Middleweight	Nassourdine Imavov	def.	Roman Dolidze	Decision (majority) (49–44, 47–47, 48–46)	5	5:00	(Note: Imavov was deducted one point in round 4 due to an illegal soccer kick.)
Lightweight	Renato Moicano	def.	Drew Dober	Decision (unanimous) (29–28, 29–28, 29–28)	3	5:00
Welterweight	Randy Brown	def.	Muslim Salikhov	KO (punches)	1	3:17
Women's Flyweight	Natália Silva	def.	Viviane Araújo	Decision (unanimous) (29–28, 29–28, 29–28)	3	5:00
Middleweight	Aliaskhab Khizriev	vs.	Makhmud Muradov	No Contest (accidental eye poke)	1	0:11	(Note: Accidental eye poke rendered Muradov unable to continue.)
Welterweight	Charles Radtke	def.	Gilbert Urbina	TKO (punches)	1	4:47
Preliminary card (ESPN+)
Women's Strawweight	Molly McCann	def.	Diana Belbiţă	Submission (armbar)	1	4:59
Flyweight	Charles Johnson	def.	Azat Maksum	Decision (unanimous) (29–28, 29–28, 29–28)	3	5:00
Welterweight	Themba Gorimbo	def.	Pete Rodriguez	TKO (punches)	1	0:32
Featherweight	Lee Jeong-yeong	def.	Blake Bilder	Decision (unanimous) (30–27, 30–27, 30–27)	3	5:00
Catchweight (129 lb)	Luana Carolina	def.	Julija Stoliarenko	TKO (punches)	3	4:52
Lightweight	Marquel Mederos	def.	Landon Quiñones	Decision (unanimous) (29–28, 29–28, 29–28)	3	5:00
Heavyweight	Jamal Pogues	def.	Thomas Petersen	Decision (unanimous) (29–28, 29–28, 30–27)	3	5:00

== Bonus awards ==
The following fighters received $50,000 bonuses.

- Fight of the Night: Charles Johnson vs. Azat Maksum
- Performance of the Night: Randy Brown and Molly McCann

== See also ==
- 2024 in UFC
- List of current UFC fighters
- List of UFC events
