= Chanajon P.K. Saenchai Muaythaigym =

Thai Muay Thai fighter

- Born: Sura Srimalai; July 9, 1988 (age 38); Buriram, Thailand
- Nationality: Thai
- Height: 180 cm (5 ft 11 in)
- Weight: 77 kg (170 lb; 12.1 st)
- Division: Middleweight; Light middleweight
- Style: Muay Thai
- Fighting out of: Bangkok, Thailand
- Team: P.K. Saenchai Muaythai Gym

Kickboxing record
- Total: 148
- Wins: 113
- Losses: 30
- Draws: 5

Chanajon P.K. Saenchai Muaythai Gym (Thai: ชนะจน พี.เค.แสนชัยมวยไทยยิม; born July 9, 1988) is a Thai Muay Thai fighter from the Buriram province of Thailand. He is a former Rajadamnern Stadium Light Middleweight Champion.

== Personal life ==
Chanajon appeared in the 2017 film A Prayer Before Dawn as a Muay Thai fighter named Chanachol who faces the lead character at the end of the film.

== Muay Thai career ==
Chanajon currently competes for the THAI FIGHT promotion, where he has won the 2017 THAI FIGHT Tournament at 72.5 kg. As of February 2020, Chanajon is ranked the No. 9 middleweight by WBC Muaythai. As of October 2020, he is ranked the No.6 middleweight by the WMO World Muay Thai Organization.

On March 15, 2014, Chanajon defeated Eakchanachai at Omnoi Stadium to win the 24th Isuzu Cup Tournament.

=== THAI FIGHT ===
By winning the Isuzu Cup, he was able to appear on Thailand's major Muay Thai event: THAI FIGHT. Chanajon would make his THAI FIGHT debut at THAI FIGHT World Battle 2014: Chakrinaruebet on April 6, 2014. Facing Saiyok Pumpanmuang in the 2014 Isuzu Cup Superfight, he went on to lose by second-round knockout via elbow.

Chanajon would win his next THAI FIGHT bout, defeating Anes Lakhmari by first-round KO on August 16, 2014 at THAI FIGHT World Battle 2014: Nakhon Sawan.

On September 20, 2014, Chanajon lost by first-round KO to Naimjon Tuhtaboyev via spinning back elbow at THAI FIGHT World Battle 2014: Vietnam.

He closed out 2014 with wins over Nabil Lettat and Gaëtan Dambo on November 22 and December 21 respectively, both of which were at THAI FIGHT.

Chanajon returned to THAI FIGHT on April 30, 2016, facing Nicholas Carter at THAI FIGHT Samui 2016. He wound up winning the three-round decision.

He would return to compete for THAI FIGHT on a long-term basis beginning 2017, when he appeared at THAI FIGHT Barcelona on September 30, 2017. There, he lost to Edye Ruiz by three-round decision.

He would bounce back with a three-round decision win over Islam Murtazaev in the 2017 THAI FIGHT 72.5 kg Semi-Finals at THAI FIGHT Chiang Mai on December 23, 2017.

On January 27, 2018, he rematched with Saiyok Pumpanmuang, whom he faced in his THAI FIGHT debut, this time with the 2017 THAI FIGHT 72.5 kg Championship on the line. In their rematch, Chanajon ended up winning by second-round knockout after landing a high kick, claiming the 2017 THAI FIGHT 72.5 kg title.

On February 9, 2020 Chanajon challenged Jimmy Vienot for his WMC World -160 lbs title at the Empire Fight event in France. He lost by the fight by decision.

=== ONE Championship ===
After a three-year layoff, Chanajon returned to action to face Victor Hugo at ONE Friday Fights 18 on May 26, 2023. He won the fight by unanimous decision.

== Titles and accomplishments ==
- THAI FIGHT
  - 2017 Thai Fight King's Cup Tournament Champion (72.5 kg / 160 lb)
  - 20–3 record
- IMTU
  - 2015 IMTU Muay Thai World Champion (72.5 kg / 160 lb)
- Omnoi Stadium
  - 2014 Isuzu Cup Tournament Winner (72 kg / 159 lb)
- Rajadamnern Stadium
  - 2010 Rajadamnern Stadium Light Middleweight Champion (70 kg / 154 lb)

== Muay Thai record ==
Muay Thai record
113 Wins , 32 Losses , 5 Draws
Date	Result	Opponent	Event	Location	Method	Round	Time
2024-08-16	Loss	(Russia) Denis Burmatov	ONE Friday Fights 75, Lumpinee Stadium	Bangkok, Thailand	Decision (Unanimous)	3	3:00
2023-12-01	Loss	(Iraq) Mustafa Al Tekreeti	ONE Friday Fights 43, Lumpinee Stadium	Bangkok, Thailand	TKO (Uppercut)	2	2:42
2023-09-29	Win	(United Kingdom) George Jarvis	ONE Friday Fights 35, Lumpinee Stadium	Bangkok, Thailand	Decision (Split)	3	3:00
2023-08-11	Win	(France) Mohamed Hanoun	ONE Friday Fights 28, Lumpinee Stadium	Bangkok, Thailand	KO (Right cross)	2	0:28
2023-05-26	Win	(Brazil) Victor Hugo	ONE Friday Fights 18, Lumpinee Stadium	Bangkok, Thailand	Decision (Unanimous)	3	3:00
2020-02-08	Loss	(France) Jimmy Vienot	Empire Fight	Doubs, France	Decision	5	3:00
For the WMC World Middleweight 160lb title.
2019-12-21	Win	(Spain) Nayanesh Ayman	THAI FIGHT Thai Fest in Patong	Phuket, Thailand	Decision	3	3:00
2019-10-26	Win	(United Kingdom) Charlie Guest	THAI FIGHT Bangsaen	Chonburi, Thailand	Decision	3	3:00
2019-08-24	Win	(Brazil) Thiago Texeira	THAI FIGHT Kham Chanod	Udon Thani, Thailand	Ext.R. Decision	4	3:00
2019-06-29	Win	(Brazil) Jean Carlos Pereira	THAI FIGHT Betong	Betong, Thailand	TKO (Injury)	1	3:00
2019-04-27	Win	(Poland) Patryk Borowski Beszta	THAI FIGHT Samui 2019	Ko Samui, Thailand	Decision	3	3:00
2019-03-30	Win	(Uzbekistan) Naimjon Tuhtaboev	THAI FIGHT Mueang Khon 2019	Nakhon Si Thammarat, Thailand	Decision	3	3:00
2019-02-23	Win	(Germany) Philipp Engeroff	THAI FIGHT Phuket 2019	Phuket, Thailand	KO (Punch)	2	
2018-12-23	Win	(Germany) Philipp Engeroff	THAI FIGHT Chiang Mai	Chiang Mai, Thailand	Decision	3	3:00
2018-11-24	Win	(Iran) Reza Ahmadnezhad	THAI FIGHT Saraburi	Saraburi, Thailand	TKO	1	
2018-10-27	Win	(Germany) Erhan Gungor	THAI FIGHT Chiangrai 2018	Chiang Rai, Thailand	KO (Punch)	1	
2018-08-25	Win	(Uzbekistan) Timur Djabbarov	THAI FIGHT Rayong	Rayong, Thailand	KO (Punches)	2	
2018-07-07	Win	(Myanmar) Pite Htwe	THAI FIGHT Hat Yai	Hat Yai, Thailand	KO (Knees and elbows)	2	
2018-05-12	Win	(Iran) Keivan Solemani	THAI FIGHT Samui 2018	Ko Samui, Thailand	Decision	3	3:00
2018-03-24	Win	(Switzerland) Gligor Stojanov	THAI FIGHT Mueang Khon 2018	Nakhon Si Thammarat, Thailand	Decision	3	3:00
2018-01-27	Win	(Thailand) Saiyok Pumpanmuang	THAI FIGHT 2017 Bangkok	Bangkok, Thailand	KO (High kick)	2	
Wins the 2017 THAI FIGHT 72.5kg title.
2017-12-23	Win	(Russia) Islam Murtazaev	THAI FIGHT Chiang Mai	Chiang Mai, Thailand	Decision	3	3:00
2017-09-30	Loss	(Spain) Edye Ruiz	THAI FIGHT Barcelona	Barcelona, Spain	Decision	3	3:00
2017-05-27	Win	(France) Jimmy Vienot	Warriors Night	Paris, France	Decision	5	3:00
2016-11-27	Win	(France) Johane Beausejour	Warriors Night	Paris, France	Decision	5	3:00
2016-04-30	Win	(United Kingdom) Nicholas Carter	THAI FIGHT Samui 2016	Ko Samui, Thailand	Decision	3	3:00
2016-03-12	Win	(France) Gaëtan Dambo	Emperor Chok Dee	Meurthe-et-Moselle, France	KO	2	
2015-12-11	Win	(France) Jimmy Vienot	Best of Siam 7	Paris, France	Decision	5	3:00
2015-10-10	Win	(France) Mickael Francoise	Battle 974	Réunion, France	TKO	2	
Wins the IMTU World 160lbs title.
2015-09-26	Loss	(Morocco) Youssef Boughanem	Omnoi Stadium	Bangkok, Thailand	Decision	5	3:00
For the Omnoi Stadium 160lbs title.
2015-08-08	Win	(Thailand) Sirimongkol Sitanupap	Omnoi Stadium	Bangkok, Thailand	Decision	5	3:00
2014-12-21	Win	(France) Gaëtan Dambo	THAI FIGHT 2014	Bangkok, Thailand	Decision	3	3:00
2014-11-22	Win	(Algeria) Nabil Lettat	THAI FIGHT 2014	Khon Kaen, Thailand	TKO (Referee stoppage)	3	
2014-09-20	Loss	(Uzbekistan) Naimjon Tuhtaboev	THAI FIGHT WORLD BATTLE 2014: Vietnam	Ho Chi Minh City, Vietnam	KO (Spinning back elbow)	1	
2014-08-16	Win	(France) Anes Lakhmari	THAI FIGHT WORLD BATTLE 2014: Nakhon Sawan	Nakhon Sawan, Thailand	KO	1	
2014-04-06	Loss	(Thailand) Saiyok Pumpanmuang	THAI FIGHT WORLD BATTLE 2014: Chakrinaruebet	Sattahip, Chonburi, Thailand	KO (Left elbow)	2	
2014-03-15	Win	(Thailand) Eakhanachai Kaewsamrit	Omnoi Stadium	Bangkok, Thailand	Decision	5	3:00
Wins Siam Omnoi Isuzu Cup.
2014-02-15	Win	(Thailand) Peemai Jitmuangnon	Omnoi Stadium	Bangkok, Thailand	TKO	5	
2013-11-23	Win	(Thailand) Anantadet Petchsupapan	Omnoi Stadium	Bangkok, Thailand	KO	3	
2013-10-12	Loss	(Thailand) Yodpayak Sitsongpeenong	Omnoi Stadium	Bangkok, Thailand	Decision	5	3:00
2010-00-00	Win	(Thailand) Jaochalarm Sor. Pinyo	Rajadamnern Stadium	Bangkok, Thailand	Decision	5	3:00
Wins the Rajadamnern Stadium Light Middleweight (70kg) title.
Legend: Win Loss Draw/No contest Notes

== Lethwei record ==
Professional Lethwei record
0 wins, 1 losses, 1 draws
Date	Result	Opponent	Event	Location	Method	Round	Time
2016-10-09	Draw	(Myanmar) Too Too	GTG International Challenge Fights 2016	Yangon, Myanmar	Draw	3	
Legend: Win Loss Draw/No contest Notes
