= Vero Nika =

Burmese Lethwei and Muay Thai fighter

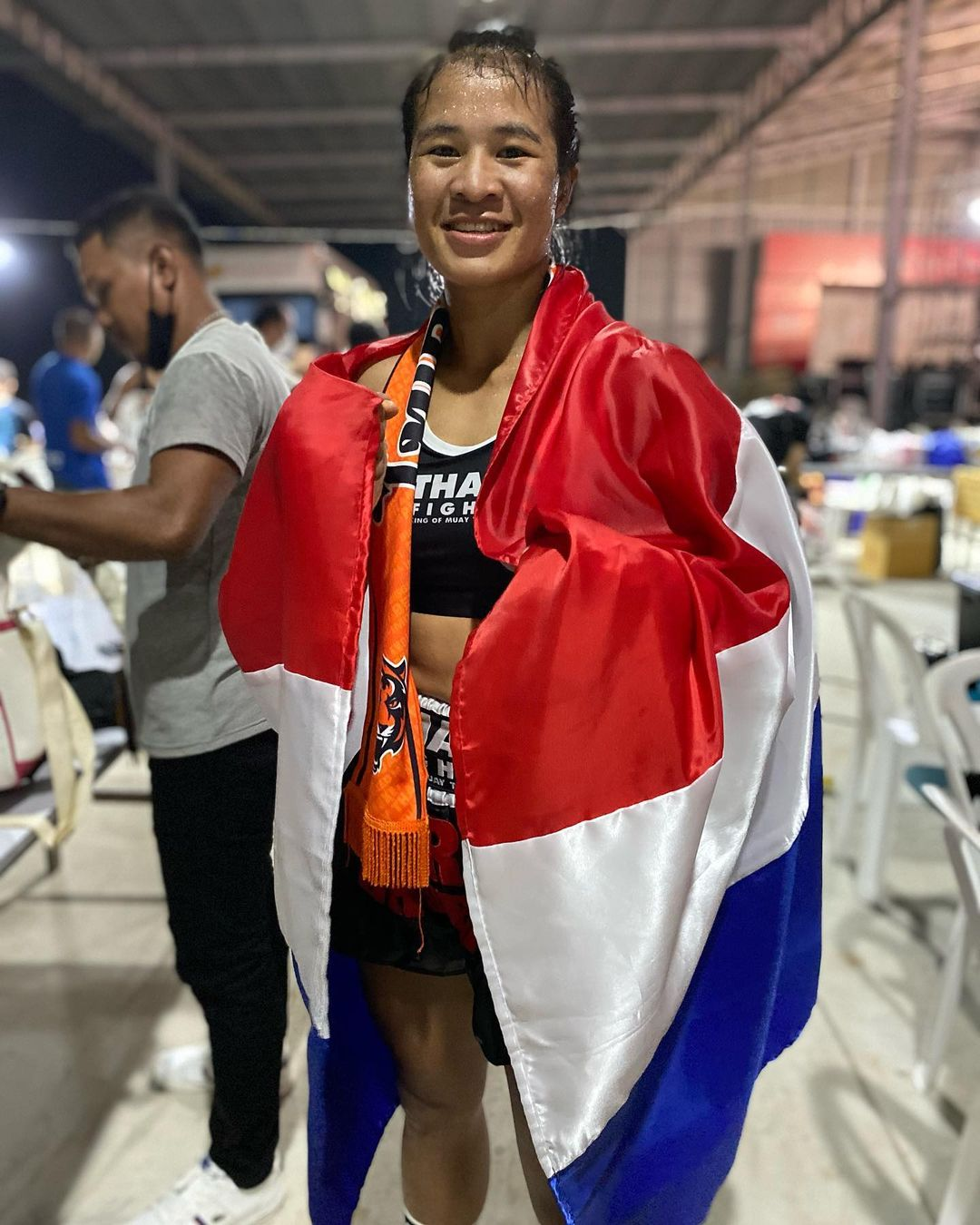
- Vero Nika in June 2022
- Born: Verow; 15 July 1996 (age 30); Mobye Village, Pekon Township, Shan State, Myanmar
- Native name: မူဘယ်ရောနီကာ
- Other names: Kayan Leopard (ကယန်းကျားသစ်); Vero V.Rujirawong (เวโร ว.รุจิรวงศ์); Saokraeng Loomsalawin (สาวแกร่ง ลุ่มสาละวิน)
- Height: 1.64 m (5 ft 4 1/2 in)
- Weight: 53 kg (117 lb; 8 st)
- Division: Bantamweight
- Style: Lethwei, Boxing, Muay Thai
- Stance: Orthodox
- Fighting out of: Pekon city, Shan State, Myanmar
- Team: Tiger Muay Thai
- Trainer: Luangnin
- Years active: 2017–present

Kickboxing record
- Total: 25
- Wins: 22
- By knockout: 10
- Losses: 3

Other information
- Boxing record from BoxRec

Vero Nika (Burmese: ဘရော်နီကာ) is a Burmese Lethwei and Muay Thai fighter. She is one of the most successful female Lethwei fighters in the sport. In 2022, amid unrest in Myanmar because of the 2021 Myanmar coup d'état, she started competing in Muay Thai in neighboring Thailand where she reached the no.1 spot in the female world Muay Thai rankings at 53 kg according to World Muay Thai Organization and became Thai Fight Kard Chuek Champion. In 2025, she signed with ONE Championship. As of September 22, 2026, Vero is ranked #2 in ONE's Women's Atomweight Muay Thai rankings.

== Early life ==
Vero Nika was born in East Kahpu, a small village north of Mobye. She is a Christian and although she was born in the Shan State, she is an ethnic Kayan, and was named after Saint Veronica. After her fights, she can sometimes be seen carrying the flag of the Karenni and/or Kayan people. When she was young she had to help her mother sell the alcohol she made herself. Her father was sick, so she would get up early before school and deliver around town, missing some time at school. Vero Nika is the fifth child out of six, and they relied on the Roman Catholic monastery in Pekon for their education.

== Fighting career ==
=== Boxing ===
At the age of 16, when she was in 9th grade, she was determined to become a fighter. Her parents did not approve of her new hobby, but she was committed to succeeding. With some borrowed money she left for Naypyidaw to start her training. Since she mainly spoke in the Padaung language she had trouble understanding those who spoke Burmese. While in training, that gradually improved. She continued to attend school but was forced to choose between education and sports a year later. Her boxing career lasted from 2013 to 2017 in which she participated in the 2015 SEA Games in Singapore, and partook in several national championships claiming at least two gold medals in the process.

=== Lethwei ===
In 2017, Vero Nika started her Lethwei career because there weren't enough fights in boxing. After being scouted by International Lethwei Federation Japan (ILFJ) promoter Yoshiyuki Nakamura in May, she participated in their Frontier event. She faced pro-wrestler Nanae Takahashi in a three-round contest for the ILFJ Frontier Championship belt.

On 15 November 2017, Vero Nika faced Julija Stoliarenko in Lethwei Grand Prix Japan 2017 in Tokyo. Stoliarenko's low-kicks caused a fracture in Vero Nika's tibia and she had to retire from the fight. Stoliarenko won the Japan Lethwei World Title by TKO.

In October 2018, a mix-fight card was held in Thailand with both Lethwei and Muay Thai bouts featured. The Lethwei portion of the show was also narrated in Burmese by the ringside announcer. Vero Nika faced Hongthong Liangprasert in the first of three encounters in her career. Due to a cut in round two, the fight was stopped and Vero Nika won by TKO.

At the Air KBZ sponsored championship in 2018, Vero Nika once more fought Hongthong Liangprasert, this time for a chance to win the accompanying belt especially created for that match. The fight ended up a draw however, so the belt was up for grabs again in January where she fought Wanida Yucharoen. This time around she won the fight and is officially crowned the Myanmar champion.

In August 2019 she faced multiple-time Muay Thai champion Sawsing Sor Sopit at the 4th Myanmar Lethwei World Championship event. This was a clear step up in competition and the fight was much anticipated. Despite her many elbows and kicks it ended in a draw after 4 rounds.

By 2020, Vero Nika was one of the most frequently seen fighters and had been booked in 8 fights in 2019 of which 6 materialized. Vero Nika has previously expressed that it is difficult to get fights because there are very few native female Lethwei fighters.

=== Muay Thai ===
While fighting, she has been able to support her family to a certain extent, but the low income had kept her from committing to her career. At the start of the COVID-19 pandemic when fights were scarce, aside from helping her family in the farming business, Vero Nika temporarily took on the role of trainer at Phoenix Myanmar Lethwei Gym in Yangon. Vero Nika's venture into Thailand started when a client who visited the gym suggested that it would be easier to get fights abroad and helped her get into contact with Tiger Muay Thai. After two encounters with Dangkongfah at Muay Hardcore, she was invited to Thai Fight. By the time she had her third fight, they had signed her to a 3-year contract.

On 17 April 2022, Vero Nika defeated her opponent, Thailand's Yimsiam, in just 30 seconds of the first round. She was then promoted to the no.1 spot in the female world rankings at 118 lbs/53 kg according to World Muay Thai Organization.

==== ONE Championship ====
On 28 January 2025, it was announced that Vero signed with ONE Championship.

== Personal life ==
Vero Nika loves to sing and is also known by her nickname "Fighting Idol". In 2018, she appeared on the third season of Myanmar Idol. She survived until the Green Mile, where she was eliminated. Sometimes she has a hard time when thinking of her family back home and the struggles they face. She confides in singing and listening to her favorite songs from home.

== Titles and accomplishments ==
Championships and Awards

- Lethwei
  - Air KBZ Grand Final Myanmar Championship (60 kg)
  - 2019 Female Fighter of the Year
- Muaythai
  - Thai Fight Kard Chuek 2023 tournament Champion (54 kg)
  - Thai Fight Kard Chuek 2022 tournament Champion (53 kg)
  - World Muaythai Organization (WMO) No. 1 Ranked Women Bantamweight (53 kg)
  - World Boxing Council (WBC) Muay Thai No. 1 Contender Women Bantamweight (53 kg)
  - 2022 WMO Female Fighter of the Year
- Boxing
  - (gold) 2016 Myanmar National Boxing Championship (60 kg)
  - (gold) 2015 4th Myanmar National Sports Festival (60 kg)
  - (bronze) 2015 Southeast Asian Games (57 kg) – Tampines, Singapore
- Personal
  - Certificate of Honor - Kayan Literature and Culture Central Committee (2023)
  - National Unity Government of Myanmar Letter of Congratulations - Ministry of Women, Youth and Children (2022)

== Muay Thai and kickboxing record ==
Professional Muay Thai and kickboxing record
22 Wins (10 (T)KOs), 3 Losses, 0 Draws
Date	Result	Opponent	Event	Location	Method	Round	Time
2026-05-22	Win	(Japan) Kana Morimoto	ONE Friday Fights 155, Lumpinee Stadium	Bangkok, Thailand	Decision (Unanimous)	3	3:00
2026-02-20	Win	(Israel) Shir Cohen	ONE Friday Fights 143, Lumpinee Stadium	Bangkok, Thailand	Decision (Split)	3	3:00
2025-11-07	Win	(China) Li Mingrui	ONE Friday Fights 132, Lumpinee Stadium	Bangkok, Thailand	Decision (Split)	3	3:00
2025-05-09	Win	(Thailand) Junior Fairtex	ONE Friday Fights 107, Lumpinee Stadium	Bangkok, Thailand	TKO (punches)	2	1:09
2025-02-14	Loss	(Chile) Francisca Vera	ONE Friday Fights 97, Lumpinee Stadium	Bangkok, Thailand	Decision (Split)	3	3:00
2024-08-04	Win	(Argentina) Florencia Greco	Thai Fight: Mueang Khon	Nakhon Si Thammarat, Thailand	Decision	3	2:00
2024-02-25	Loss	(Thailand) Fahsai Or.Yutthachai	Thai Fight: Phimai	Nakhon Ratchasima, Thailand	Decision	3	2:00
2024-02-04	Win	(Thailand) Nongbew Tor.Thepsutin	Thai Fight: Rajabhakti Park	Hua Hin district, Thailand	TKO	1	
2023-12-24	Win	(Thailand) Phayasingha Sor.Sommit	Thai Fight: Luang Pu Thuat	Ayutthaya, Thailand	TKO	1	
Wins 2023 Thai Fight Royal Cup -54kg title
2023-11-26	Win	(Iran) Zahra Shokouhi	Thai Fight: Bang Kachao	Phra Pradaeng district, Thailand	Decision	3	2:00
2023-10-29	Win	(Thailand) Phayasingha Sor.Sommit	Thai Fight: Sethi Ruea Thong	Ban Mi district, Thailand	Decision	3	2:00
2023-06-18	Win	(Vietnam) Triệu Thị Phương Thủy	Thai Fight: Luk Luang Phor Sothorn	Chachoengsao, Thailand	TKO	3	
2023-05-21	Win	(Thailand) Aomsin Srithong Gym	Thai Fight: 100 Years Rajabhat Korat	Nakhon Ratchasima, Thailand	KO	1	
2023-04-22	Win	(Italy) Ester Viola	Thai Fight: Rome	Genzano di Roma, Italy	Decision	3	2:00
2023-02-05	Win	(Brazil) Yuly Alves	Thai Fight: Luang Phor Ruay	Saraburi, Thailand	Decision	3	2:00
2022-12-24	Win	(Greece) Fani Peloumpi	Thai Fight: Metropolitan Police Bureau 100th Anniversary	Bangkok, Thailand	KO (Right cross)	3	
Wins 2022 Thai Fight Royal Cup -53kg title
2022-11-20	Win	(Argentina) Daniela Lopez	Thai Fight: Vana Nava Hua Hin	Hua Hin district, Thailand	Decision	3	2:00
2022-10-16	Win	(Brazil) Mariana Bernardes	Thai Fight: Vajiravudh	Bangkok, Thailand	KO (Left hook to the body)	2	
2022-06-26	Win	(Thailand) Plaifah Sor.Nittaya	Thai Fight: Sisaket	Sisaket, Thailand	KO	2	
2022-05-29	Win	(United States) Angela Chang	Thai Fight: Nakhon Sawan	Nakhon Sawan, Thailand	Decision (Unanimous)	3	2:00
2022-05-08	Win	(Iran) Sanaz Feizollah	Thai Fight: Sung Noem	Sung Noen, Thailand	KO	1	
2022-04-17	Win	(Thailand) Yimsiam Komin-Furniture	Thai Fight: Pathum Thani	Pathum Thani, Thailand	KO	1	
2022-03-20	Win	(Thailand) Petchsarocha Looksaikongdin	Thai Fight: Lampang	Lampang, Thailand	Decision (Unanimous)	3	2:00
2022-02-26	Win	(Thailand) Dangkongfah Smartheartpowerpackgirl	Muay Hardcore	Thailand	Decision (Unanimous)	3	3:00
2022-01-08	Loss	(Thailand) Dangkongfah Smartheartpowerpackgirl	Muay Hardcore	Thailand	Decision (Split)	3	3:00
Legend: Win Loss Draw/No contest Notes

== Lethwei record ==
Professional Lethwei record
18 fights, 9 wins (9 (T)KOs), 1 loss, 8 draws
Date	Result	Opponent	Event	Location	Method	Round	Time
2020-01-15	Win	(Thailand) Petchsaifah Sor.Sommai	(68th) Kayah State Day	Loikaw, Myanmar	KO	1	
2020-01-04	Win	(Thailand) Plaifah Mhooping Aroijungbei	Mandalay Rumbling Challenge Fight	Taungoo, Myanmar	KO	2	
2019-11-03	Draw	(France) Miriam Sabot	(6th) Air KBZ Aung Lan Championship	Yangon, Myanmar	Draw	4	3:00
2019-08-18	Draw	(Thailand) Sawsing Sor Sopit	Myanmar Lethwei World Championship 4	Yangon, Myanmar	Draw	4	3:00
2019-04-20	Win	(Thailand) Prakayrat Wongsuta	Zin Kyaik Buddha Pujaniya Festival	Zin Kyaik, Myanmar	KO	2	
2019-03-20	Draw	(Thailand) Hongthong Liangprasert	Mon-Myanmar-Thai Challenge Fights	Lamaing, Ye, Myanmar	Draw	4	3:00
2019-01-09	Win	(Thailand) Phettae Kulabdamgym	(27th) Karen New Year Celebration	Hpa-an, Myanmar	KO	2	
2019-01-04	Win	(Thailand) Wanida Yucharoen	Independence Day Challenge Fights	Taungoo, Myanmar	TKO	1	
Wins Air KBZ Championship belt
2018-12-16	Draw	(Thailand) Hongthong Liangprasert	Air KBZ Grand Final Myanmar Championship	Yangon, Myanmar	Draw	4	3:00
For Air KBZ Championship belt
2018-10-28	Win	(Thailand) Hongthong Liangprasert	Diamond Super Fight	Samut Sakhon province, Thailand	TKO	2	
2018-09-13	Draw	(Japan) Marina Kumagai	Lethwei in Japan 9: Kodo	Tokyo, Japan	Draw	5	3:00
2018-08-19	Draw	(Belarus) Elena Mishchuk	Myanmar Lethwei World Championship 3	Yangon, Myanmar	Draw	4	3:00
2018-03-25	Win	(Thailand) Jompaneng Sitpusoy Kom Ning	Lethwei in Thailand	Samut Sakhon province, Thailand	KO	2	
2018-03-01	Win	(Thailand) Prakayrat Wongsuta	Kyaik Kelasa Stadium	Lamaing, Ye, Myanmar	TKO	3	
2018-01-04	Win	(Myanmar) Mway Pway Ma	Mandalay Rumbling Challenge Fight	Taungoo, Myanmar	KO	3	
2017-11-15	Loss	(Lithuania) Julija Stoliarenko	Lethwei Grand Prix Japan 2017	Tokyo, Japan	TKO	2	0:45
For ILFJ Women's Featherweight World Championship
2017-08-20	Draw	(Costa Rica) Mónica Brenes	Myanmar Lethwei World Championship 2	Yangon, Myanmar	Draw	4	3:00
2017-06-16	Draw	(Japan) Nanae Takahashi	Lethwei in Japan 4: Frontier	Tokyo, Japan	Draw	3	3:00
For ILFJ Women's Featherweight World Championship
Legend: Win Loss Draw/No contest Notes

== Amateur boxing record ==
Result	Opponent	Type	Round	Date	Location	Notes
Win	(Myanmar) Ngu War Oo			3 December 2016	Yangon, Myanmar	2016 Myanmar National Boxing Championship
Loss	(Thailand) Tassamalee Thongjan	DEC	3 (3)	8 June 2015	Expo Hall 1, Tampines, Singapore	2015 Southeast Asian Games semi-final
Win	(Singapore) Nurshahidah Roslie	DEC	3 (3)	6 June 2015	Expo Hall 1, Tampines, Singapore	2015 Southeast Asian Games quarter-final
Win	(Myanmar) May Ye			28 February 2015	Wunna Theikdi Indoor Stadium, Naypyidaw, Myanmar	4th Myanmar National Sports Festival final
Win	(Myanmar) Naw Ohn Mar Soe			25 February 2015	Wunna Theikdi Indoor Stadium, Naypyidaw, Myanmar	4th Myanmar National Sports Festival quarter-final
Loss	(Myanmar) Hkatta Su Hlaing			4 March 2013	Naypyidaw, Myanmar	2013 Union Cup Games
