= Alex Gong =

American kickboxer (1970–2003)

- Born: Alex James Gong; October 14, 1970; Boston, Massachusetts, United States
- Died: August 1, 2003 (aged 32); San Francisco, California, United States
- Other names: F-14
- Nationality: United States
- Height: 5 ft 11 in (1.80 m)
- Weight: 155 lb (70 kg; 11.1 st)
- Division: Super Welterweight; Light Middleweight
- Style: Muay Thai
- Fighting out of: San Francisco, California, United States
- Team: Fairtex Gym

Kickboxing record
- Total: 29
- Wins: 27
- By knockout: 13
- Losses: 2
- Draws: 0

Alexander James Gong (October 14, 1970 – August 1, 2003) was an American Muay Thai kickboxer.

== Early life ==
Gong was born and raised in Boston. When he was 8, Alex Gong's parents went through an acrimonious divorce; during a dispute over custody, his father, James Gong, took the boy to India and Tibet, leaving him in the care of Children's Village, a boarding school in Dharamsala. Alex did not see his mother for nearly three years; when he was 11, he turned up at the United States embassy in Kathmandu, Nepal. At the time, he could not find his mother, Nita, because she had returned to using her maiden name (Tomaszewski) and was living in New Hampshire.

Gong stated in 2001 his interest in martial arts started when he was 5, crediting "those old Bruce Lee films". He did not speak much about his years in Dharamsala except to remark that he fought a lot as a kid. Gong dropped out of high school, but later enrolled at San Francisco State University and earned a business degree. In 1989, Gong met Chuck Norris at the Fresno Yosemite International Airport, where Gong was working at a ticket counter. Gong took up Muay Thai in 1993. Prior to that, Gong had trained in tai chi, aikido, taekwondo, karate, and judo.

== Career ==
Gong was a world champion of ISKA World Muay Thai, Junior middleweight class. He won his world title in 1999. He defended his title on August 5, 2000. Gong also held a 2-0-0 record in K-1 including wins over Melvin Murray and Duane Ludwig.

Gong was featured as a fighter in an episode of Walker, Texas Ranger entitled "Legends", alongside notable fighters Joe Lewis, Bill Wallace, Howard Jackson, Don Wilson, Olando Rivera, Jean-Claude Leuyer, and Danny Steele.

In addition to his fighting career, in 1996 Gong opened a branch of the Fairtex Gym at 444 Clementina in San Francisco to instruct students in Muay Thai after the Fairtex in Chandler, Arizona at which he had initially trained went bankrupt, hiring Bunkerd Fairtex as the head trainer. When he first came to the Bay Area, he had trained in makeshift facilities. Later, in 2000, he added a second location in Daly City. The Fairtex that Gong operated in San Francisco had been recognized by the World Muay Thai Council as the top training facility in the United States. That gym regularly held amateur sparring matches as "Saturday night smokers", which Gong called "civilized war ... for the extra-adrenaline junkie."

=== Titles ===
- US Amateur Light Middleweight Champion (1995)
- North American Super Welterweight Champion (1996)
- Inter-Continental Super Welterweight Champion (1997)
- North American Light Middleweight Champion (1998)
- World Light Middleweight Champion (1999)

=== Kickboxing record ===
Kickboxing record
27 win (13 KO's), 2 losses
Date	Result	Opponent	Event	Location	Method	Round	Time	Notes
May 5, 2001	Win	(United States) Duane Ludwig	K-1 World Grand Prix 2001 Preliminary USA	Las Vegas, Nevada, USA	Decision (split)	5	3:00	For ISKA Muay Thai Light Middleweight World Championship.
August 5, 2000	Win	(Canada) Melvin Murray	K-1 USA Championships 2000	Las Vegas, Nevada, USA	TKO	3	2:44	For ISKA Muay Thai Light Middleweight World Championship.
October 10, 1998	Win	(United States) Travis Doerge	Strikeforce	San Jose, California, USA	KO	1	1:05	For ISKA Muay Thai Super Welterweight World Championship.
Legend: Win Loss Draw/No contest

== Death ==
On August 1, 2003, a hit and run driver crashed into Gong's parked car at approximately 4:30 PM outside the Fairtex Gym that Gong operated. Gong pursued the car on foot. After Gong caught up to the vehicle, which was stopped in traffic at Fifth and Harrison, he confronted the driver. According to a woman who was a passenger in the car, the driver told Gong "I can't stop, I'm wanted by the police, I can't stop and deal with this, I'm sorry, but I gotta go" to which Gong responded by smashing the car's window and turn signal. Witnesses say the driver shot Gong at point blank range and fled in his vehicle, turning right on Harrison. Brian Lam, then working as an instructor at Fairtex, had followed Gong to the scene and provided CPR alongside a motorcycle police officer, but Gong was pronounced dead at the scene. The license plate of the car driven by the hit-and-run driver was publicized following Gong's death.

The vehicle was found abandoned in Millbrae later that night; police determined the car had been stolen in July, and was carrying a license plate stolen from another vehicle. The gym was closed after the shooting, but regulars and neighbors posted tributes. On August 4, 2003, after police received an unspecified tip, a man named a "person of interest" in the shooting was confronted at a hotel in South San Francisco. Following a lengthy standoff with police, the man died by suicide. No one was ever charged in Gong's death.
