= Fairtex Gym =

Martial arts training center

FAIRTEX
- FAIRTEX® Logo
- Type: Private
- Industry: Muay Thai, Kickboxing Brand, Brazilian jiujitsu, Mixed martial arts
- Founded: 1958; 68 years ago in Bangkok, Thailand
- Founder: Philip Wong
- Headquarters: Bang Lamung District, Pattaya, Thailand
- Area served: Worldwide
- Products: Martial arts equipment, sporting equipment, clothing, accessories
- Services: Manufacturer, fighter management
- Website: fairtex.com

Fairtex Gym is the name given to a number of Muay Thai, Kick boxing, Boxing, Brazilian jiujitsu and Mixed martial arts gyms around the world. The original Fairtex Gym was founded in Bangkok, Thailand in 1975.

== History ==
The Fairtex Garments Factory Company Limited was founded by Mr. Philip Wong in 1971, selling Muay Thai training equipment and Fairtex branded T-shirts to the Thai department store market. The first Fairtex Gym was created in Bangkok. The Camp was initially established in central Bangkok but later relocated to Bangplee, about 25 km away. This location was chosen specifically to create a professional training atmosphere away from the distractions of Bangkok. The venue benefits from clean, fresh air and the cooling ocean breeze from the gulf of Thailand - a refreshing contrast to the noise and pollution of Bangkok.

Wong created Fairtex Promotions in 1978 when he became a promoter at the Lumpinee Stadium. In 1998, Mr. Philip Wong, Founder & Chairman, partnered with Anthony Lin, President & CEO, to open Fairtex Equipment Company Limited to manufacture, market and distribute Fairtex branded equipment and apparels worldwide. In 1993, a Fairtex Gym was opened in Chandler, Arizona, United States but was relocated to San Francisco, California in 1996. In 2004, Anthony Lin moved Fairtex to a new location in San Francisco. In 2007, Fairtex Mountain View was opened and Fairtex Newark, CA in 2009. In 2013, Fairtex Mountain View closed, leaving no Fairtex gyms in the United States. Nine gyms were opened in the Tokyo metropolitan area in 2004, another in Pattaya the following year in 2005 and one in 2012, Fairtex in China.

Author Sam Sheridan wrote about his time training at Fairtex in his book A Fighter's Heart. Some of his experience can also be seen in the 2002 documentary Thai Boxing: A Fighting Chance.

There are now Fairtex gyms Bangplee, Pattaya (Thailand) Arakawa, Chiba, Taitō and Warabi (Japan).

== Partnership ==
- ONE Championship
- Lumpinee Boxing Stadium
- Pattaya Boxing World

== Notable fighters ==
- (Thailand) Jongsanan Fairtex
- (Thailand) Saemapetch Fairtex
- (Thailand) Ferrari Fairtex
- (Thailand) Stamp Fairtex
- (Thailand) Bunkerd Fairtex
- (Thailand) Neungsiam Fairtex
- (Thailand) Yodsanklai Fairtex
- (Thailand) Naruepol Fairtex
- (Thailand) Kaew Fairtex
- (United States) George “TNT” Tsutsui
- (United States) Alex Gong
- (United States) Gilbert Melendez
- (United States) Ricardo Miranda
- (United States) Scott Smith
- (United States) James Irvin
- (United States) Jean-Claude Leuyer
- (United States) Scott Lighty
- (United States) Jake Shields
- (United States) Daniel Roberts
- (United States) Yvonne Trevino
- (Russia) Alex Serdyukov
- (Pakistan) Anita Karim
- (Sweden) Smilla Sundell
- (Nepal) Rabindra Dhant
- (Malaysia) Jihin Radzuan

== External ==
- Official website
- Instagram
