= International Lethwei Federation Japan =

Japanese Lethwei promotion company

- Company type: Lethwei promotion
- Founded: 2016
- Headquarters: Tokyo, Japan
- Key people: Kakuo Shimizu
- Owner: Yoshimitsu Mitsui (First On Stage Co., Ltd)
- Website: ilfj.or.jp

International Lethwei Federation Japan, also known as ILFJ, is a Japanese Lethwei promotion company with headquarters in Tokyo.

== History ==
In 2016, the ILFJ acquired a ‘’Grade-A’’ promoter licence from the Myanmar Traditional Lethwei Federation, allowing them to organize traditional Lethwei events in Japan. ILFJ then entered into a partnership with Myanmar businessman Mr. Wunna CEO of Myanmar Media Group (MMG), the organizer of the Myanmar Lethwei World Championship, to share fighters and co-organize the Lethwei events in Japan. The first ILFJ event titled Lethwei Grand Prix in Japan 2016, was held on 27 October 2016 at Korakuen Hall in Tokyo, Japan.

On April 18, 2017, the Ambassador of Myanmar to Japan attended the first ever Lethwei world title fight headlining two non-Burmese in the sport's history at Lethwei in Japan 3. The event organized by ILFJ featured reigning champion Dave Leduc vs Adem Yilmaz inside the Korakuen Hall in Tokyo.

On July 10, 2022, hosted a 10 fights Lethwei tournament named Lethwei Unbeatable in Oyabe, Japan.

== Media coverage ==
After having an inaugural first event in the Japan in Tokyo (Lethwei Grand Prix 2016), FITE TV signed a multi-year agreement to broadcast the promotion's Lethwei events.

In 2017, the ILFJ signed a broadcasting deal with MNTV to be aired in Myanmar and livestreaming available in Japan on AbemaTV.

== Events ==
#	Event	Date	Venue	Location
16	Lethwei Unbeatable	February 22, 2022	Oyabe Arena	Oyabe, Japan
15	Lethwei in Japan 15: Kizuna	February 22, 2020	Edion Arena	Osaka, Japan
14	Lethwei in Japan 14: Mysterious Tenmei	November 2, 2019	Korakuen Hall	Tokyo, Japan
13	Lethwei in Japan 13: First Intention	July 25, 2019	Korakuen Hall	Tokyo, Japan
12	Lethwei in Japan 12: Proof of the Brave	May 17, 2019	Korakuen Hall	Tokyo, Japan
11	Lethwei in Japan 11: Millennium Force	February 27, 2019	Korakuen Hall	Tokyo, Japan
10	Lethwei in Japan 10: Inori	November 14, 2018	Korakuen Hall	Tokyo, Japan
9	Lethwei in Japan 9: Kodo	September 13, 2018	Korakuen Hall	Tokyo, Japan
8	Lethwei in Japan 8: Samurai	June 29, 2018	Korakuen Hall	Tokyo, Japan
7	Lethwei in Japan 7: Yuki	February 21, 2018	Korakuen Hall	Tokyo, Japan
6	Lethwei Grand Prix Japan 2017	November 15, 2017	Korakuen Hall	Tokyo, Japan
5	Lethwei in Japan 5: Nexurise	September 28, 2017	Korakuen Hall	Tokyo, Japan
4	Lethwei in Japan 4: Frontier	June 16, 2017	Tokyo Dome City Hall	Tokyo, Japan
3	Lethwei in Japan 3: Grit	April 18, 2017	Korakuen Hall	Tokyo, Japan
2	Lethwei in Japan 2: Legacy	February 16, 2017	Korakuen Hall	Tokyo, Japan
1	Lethwei Grand Prix Japan 2016	October 27, 2016	Korakuen Hall	Tokyo, Japan

== List of champions ==
Division	Upper weight limit	Champion	Since	Title defenses
Openweight	80 kg (176.4 lb)+	(Canada) Dave Leduc	June 16, 2017 (Lethwei in Japan 4: Frontier)	0
Featherweight	65 kg (143.3 lb)	(Myanmar) Thar A Thae Ta Pwint	June 16, 2017 (Lethwei in Japan 4: Frontier)	1
Bantamweight	60 kg (132.3 lb)	(Japan) Yuta Hamamoto	June 16, 2017 (Lethwei in Japan 4: Frontier)	0
Women's Featherweight	62 kg (136.7 lb)	(Lithuania) Julija Stoliarenko	November 15, 2017 (Lethwei Grand Prix Japan 2017)	1

=== World championship history ===
==== Openweight Championship ====
No Weight limit: 80 kg (176.4 lb) and up

No.	Name	Event	Date	Reign	Defenses
1	(Canada) Dave Leduc def. Nilmungkorn Sudsakorngym	Lethwei in Japan 4: Frontier; Tokyo, Japan	June 16, 2017	631 days (Vacated)	Leduc vacated after signing with the WLC; Vacated March 9, 2019

== Rules ==
ILFJ uses traditional Lethwei rules, with no point system. The only way to win is by knockout or because of an injury or the inability to fight any more. At the end of the match if the two fighters are still standing, the fight is declared a draw.

=== Rounds ===
Each bout can be booked as 4 or 5 rounds fight with 3 minutes per round and a 2-minute break in between rounds. Championship bouts are 5 round with 3 minutes per round.

=== Weight classes ===
ILFJ utilizes the following weight classes:

Weight class name	Upper limit	
Weight class name	in kilograms (kg)	in pounds (lb)
Bantamweight	60	132.3
Featherweight	65	143.3
Welterweight	70	154.3
Middleweight	75	165.3
Openweight	No weight limit	

== Notable fighters ==
- (Canada) Dave Leduc
- (Myanmar) Tun Lwin Moe
- (Myanmar) Tun Tun Min
- (Myanmar) Too Too
- (Myanmar) Saw Nga Man
- (Myanmar) Soe Lin Oo
- (Japan) Shunichi Shimizu
- (Lithuania) Julija Stoliarenko
- (Myanmar) Vero V.Rujirawong

== See also ==
- List of Lethwei fighters
- World Lethwei Championship
- World Lethwei Federation
- Full Metal Dojo
- Kickboxing
