= Julija Stoliarenko =

Lithuanian mixed martial artist and Lethwei fighter

- Born: 8 April 1993 (age 33); Visaginas, Lithuania
- Height: 5 ft 8 in (1.73 m)
- Weight: 125 lb (57 kg; 8.9 st)
- Division: Bantamweight (MMA); Featherweight (MMA); Middleweight (BJJ); -69 kilograms (152 lb)
- Reach: 66 in (170 cm)
- Fighting out of: Kaunas, Lithuania
- Team: Roger Gracie Academy Kaunas / Fighter House
- Rank: BJJ black belt (Note: under Roger Gracie and Donatas Uktveris)
- Years active: 2012–present

Kickboxing record
- Total: 3
- Wins: 3
- By knockout: 3

Mixed martial arts record
- Total: 22
- Wins: 11
- By submission: 10
- By decision: 1
- Losses: 9
- By knockout: 4
- By submission: 1
- By decision: 4
- Draws: 2

Other information
- University: Lithuanian University of Health Sciences
- Mixed martial arts record from Sherdog

Julija Stoliarenko (born 8 April 1993) is a Lithuanian mixed martial artist, submission grappler, Brazilian jiu-jitsu (BJJ) black belt athlete and former Lethwei fighter. A two-time European Open champion (Note: purple and Master 1 black belt) and two-time IBJJF World medallist in the lower BJJ belt divisions; Stoliarenko is an ADCC Submission Fighting European medallist and competed in MMA in the Bantamweight division of the Ultimate Fighting Championship. Stoliarenko is the former Invicta FC Bantamweight Champion and ILFJ Women's Featherweight Lethwei World Champion.

== Background ==
Stoliarenko's father introduced her to karate when she was 12, eventually progressing towards Brazilian jiu-jitsu and mixed martial arts.

== Lethwei career ==
On June 16, 2017, Stoliarenko made her Lethwei debut at Lethwei in Japan 4: Frontier in Tokyo, Japan and knocked out Burmese Lethwei fighter Su Hlaing Oo.

On November 15, 2017, Stoliarenko faced top female Lethwei fighter in Vero Nika in Lethwei Grand Prix Japan 2017 in Tokyo and ultimately won the Japan Lethwei World Title by TKO.

On October 2, 2019, Stoliarenko made her first ILFJ title defence at Lethwei in Japan 14 and defeated Japanese fighter Yugia by TKO in the first round.

== Mixed martial arts career ==
=== The Ultimate Fighter ===
In 2018, Julija Stoliarenko was a contestant on The Ultimate Fighter: Heavy Hitters. In the Ultimate Fighter finale Stoliarenko lost to Leah Letson.

=== Invicta FC ===
On March 6, 2020, Julija defeated Liza Verzosa to win Invicta Bantamweight Championship.

=== Ultimate Fighting Championship ===
On August 8, 2020, Stoliarenko faced Yana Kunitskaya at UFC Fight Night 174. She lost the fight via unanimous decision.

Stoliarenko was expected to face Julia Avila at UFC on ESPN 21 on March 20, 2021. However at the weigh ins, Stoliarenko suffered a syncopal episode on the scale and the fight was scrapped. The pair was rescheduled and took place at UFC Fight Night 190. Stoliarenko lost the fight by submission in the third round.

Stoliarenko faced Alexis Davis at UFC Fight Night 200 on February 5, 2022. She lost the fight via unanimous decision.

Stoliarenko faced Jessica-Rose Clark on July 2, 2022 at UFC 276. She won the fight via armbar submission less than a minute into round one, thus earning her first victory in UFC in the process. This performance earned her the Performance of the Night bonus award.

Stoliarenko, as a replacement for Leah Letson, faced Chelsea Chandler in a catchweight bout of 140 pounds on October 1, 2022 at UFC Fight Night 211. She lost the bout via TKO stoppage at the end of the first round.

Stoliarenko faced Molly McCann in a flyweight bout on July 22, 2023, at UFC Fight Night 224. She won the fight by armbar submission in the first round.

Stoliarenko faced Luana Carolina on February 3, 2024, at UFC Fight Night 235. At the weigh-ins, Luana Carolina weighed in at 128 pounds, two pounds over the women's flyweight non-title fight limit. Her bout proceeded at catchweight with Carolina forfeiting an undisclosed percentage of her purse, which went to Stoliarenko. She lost the fight via technical knockout in the third round.

Stoliarenko faced Gabriella Fernandes on August 9, 2025 at UFC on ESPN 72. She lost the fight by unanimous decision.

On August 19, 2025, it was reported that Stoliarenko was removed from the UFC roster.

== Brazilian jiu-jitsu & submission grappling career ==
Competing as a blue belt at the 2015 European IBJJF Jiu-Jitsu Championship, Stoliarenko won bronze in the middleweight division and silver in open class. As a purple belt, she won bronze at the 2016 European IBJJF Jiu-Jitsu Championship.

Competing at the Abu Dhabi Grand Slam World Tour 2017–2018 – Tokyo in the −70 kg Purple division, she won silver after defeating Miyu Omani via submission. In 2018 Stoliarenko won the European IBJJF Jiu-Jitsu Championship in the medium heavy purple belt division. Promoted to brown belt, she won bronze at the 2018 World IBJJF Jiu-Jitsu Championship. In 2019 she won a silver medal at the ADCC Submission Fighting European Championship, the same year she won silver at the World Championship in medium heavy and bronze in open class.

She was promoted to BJJ black belt on 13 November 2021. In 2022 Stoliarenko took part in the 2nd ADCC European Trial organised in Luboń, Poland in the +60 kg category, she was defeated by Norwegian Ane Svendsen by points 6x0 in the quarter-finals. In 2022 she failed to win any medals at the Abu Dhabi Grand Slam World Tour 2022 in London after finishing fourth of the −70 kg division.

In 2023 she won the Masters 1 European IBJJF Open Championship in the middleweight division, also winning silver in the openweight.

== Championships and accomplishments ==
=== Mixed martial arts ===
- Ultimate Fighting Championship
  - Performance of the Night (One time) vs. Jessica-Rose Clark.
- Invicta Fighting Championships
  - Invicta FC Bantamweight Championship (One time)
- Celtic Gladiator
  - CG Bantamweight Champion (One time)

=== Lethwei ===
- International Lethwei Federation Japan
  - ILFJ Women's Featherweight World Championship (Two times)

=== Brazilian jiu-jitsu / Submission grappling ===
- IBJJF European Open Champion (2018 purple)
- IBJJF Master 1 European Champion (2023 black)
- 2nd place ADCC Submission Fighting European Championship (2019)
- 2nd place IBJJF World Jiu-jitsu Championship (2019 brown)
- 2nd place IBJJF Master 1 European Champion (2023 (Note: open class) black)
- 2nd place European IBJJF Jiu-jitsu Championship (2015 blue)
- 2nd place Abu Dhabi Grand Slam World Tour 2017–2018 – Tokyo (2017 purple)
- 3rd place IBJJF World Jiu-jitsu Championship (2018 / 2019 brown)
- 3rd place European IBJJF Jiu-jitsu Championship (2018 purple)
- 3rd place European IBJJF Jiu-jitsu Championship (2015 blue)

== Mixed martial arts record ==
Professional record breakdown
22 matches	11 wins	9 losses
By knockout	0	4
By submission	10	1
By decision	1	4
Draws	2	

Res.	Record	Opponent	Method	Event	Date	Round	Time	Location	Notes
Loss	11–9–2	Gabriella Fernandes	Decision (unanimous)	UFC on ESPN: Dolidze vs. Hernandez	August 9, 2025	3	5:00	Las Vegas, Nevada, United States	
Loss	11–8–2	Luana Carolina	TKO (punches)	UFC Fight Night: Dolidze vs. Imavov	February 3, 2024	3	4:52	Las Vegas, Nevada, United States	Catchweight (128 lb) bout; Carolina missed weight.
Win	11–7–2	Molly McCann	Submission (armbar)	UFC Fight Night: Aspinall vs. Tybura	July 22, 2023	1	1:55	London, England	Flyweight debut.
Loss	10–7–2	Chelsea Chandler	TKO (punches)	UFC Fight Night: Dern vs. Yan	October 1, 2022	1	4:15	Las Vegas, Nevada, United States	Catchweight (140 lb) bout.
Win	10–6–2	Jessica-Rose Clark	Submission (armbar)	UFC 276	July 2, 2022	1	0:42	Las Vegas, Nevada, United States	Performance of the Night.
Loss	9–6–2	Alexis Davis	Decision (unanimous)	UFC Fight Night: Hermansson vs. Strickland	February 5, 2022	3	5:00	Las Vegas, Nevada, United States	
Loss	9–5–2	Julia Avila	Submission (rear-naked choke)	UFC Fight Night: Gane vs. Volkov	June 26, 2021	3	4:19	Las Vegas, Nevada, United States	
Loss	9–4–2	Yana Kunitskaya	Decision (unanimous)	UFC Fight Night: Lewis vs. Oleinik	August 8, 2020	3	5:00	Las Vegas, Nevada, United States	
Win	9–3–2	Lisa Verzosa	Decision (split)	Invicta FC: Phoenix Series 3	March 6, 2020	5	5:00	Kansas City, Kansas, United States	Won the vacant Invicta FC Bantamweight Championship.
Win	8–3–2	Maria Tatunashvili	Submission (armbar)	KOK'80 World Series 2019 in Lithuania	November 16, 2019	1	0:20	Vilnius, Lithuania	
Win	7–3–2	Victoria Dvaraninovich	Submission (armbar)	KOK'78 World Series 2019 in Kaunas	September 21, 2019	1	0:19	Kaunas, Lithuania	
Win	6–3–2	Marta Waliczek	Submission (armbar)	Celtic Gladiator 24	June 29, 2019	1	0:30	Bielsko-Biała, Poland	Won the vacant CG Bantamweight Championship.
Win	5–3–2	Natalya Dyachkova	Submission (armbar)	KOK'69 World Series 2019 in Vilnius	March 16, 2019	1	0:00	Vilnius, Lithuania	Return to Bantamweight.
Loss	4–3–2	Leah Letson	Decision (split)	The Ultimate Fighter: Heavy Hitters Finale	November 30, 2018	3	5:00	Las Vegas, Nevada, United States	Featherweight debut.
Win	4–2–2	Alecia Zomkowski	Submission (armbar)	Bushido 74	May 4, 2018	1	0:22	Vilnius, Lithuania	
Win	3–2–2	Tatsiana Firsava	Submission (armbar)	KOK 55 World GP 2018 in Vilnius	March 17, 2018	1	0:58	Vilnius, Lithuania	
Win	2–2–2	Tetyana Voznyuk	Submission (armbar)	KOK World Series 2017 in Kaunas	September 23, 2017	1	0:58	Kaunas, Lithuania	
Draw	1–2–2	Martyna Czech	Draw (majority)	KOK World Series 2016 in Vilnius	March 19, 2016	2	5:00	Vilnius, Lithuania	Catchweight (141 lb) bout.
Loss	1–2–1	Lucie Pudilová	TKO (corner stoppage)	GCF Challenge: Back in the Fight 4	March 27, 2015	2	5:00	Příbram, Czech Republic	Catchweight (143 lb) bout.
Loss	1–1–1	Agnieszka Niedźwiedź	TKO (elbows)	Fighters Arena 9	June 8, 2014	3	2:51	Józefów, Poland	
Win	1–0–1	Eeva Siiskonen	Submission (armbar)	Carelia Fight 9	September 7, 2013	1	1:25	Imatra, Finland	
Draw	0–0–1	Evelyn Adomulyte	Draw	SWAT 30	April 14, 2012	3	5:00	Kaunas, Lithuania	Bantamweight debut.

== Lethwei record ==
Professional Lethwei Record
3 Wins, 0 Losses, 0 Draws
Date	Result	Opponent	Event	Location	Method	Round	Time
2019-10-02	Win	(Japan) Yuiga	Lethwei in Japan 14: Mysterious Tenmei	Tokyo, Japan	TKO	1	0:36
Defends ILFJ Women's Featherweight World Championship
2017-11-15	Win	(Myanmar) Vero Nika	Lethwei Grand Prix Japan 2017	Tokyo, Japan	TKO	2	0:45
Wins ILFJ Women's Featherweight World Championship
2017-06-16	Win	(Myanmar) Su Hlaing Oo	Lethwei in Japan 4: Frontier	Tokyo, Japan	KO	2	1:32
Legend: Win Loss Draw/No contest Notes

== Notes ==
Awards and achievements
Preceded by Sarah Kaufman	5th Invicta FC Bantamweight Champion; March 6, 2020 – July 31, 2020	Succeeded by Taneisha Tennant
