= 2016 in ILFJ =

2016 events pertaining to the International Lethwei Federation Japan

Information
- First date: October 27, 2016
- Last date: October 27, 2016

Events
- Total events: 1

2016 was the first year in the history of the ILFJ, a Japanese Lethwei promotion. The events were broadcast through television agreements with regional channels in Japan.

== List of events ==
#	Event	Date	Venue	Location	Attendance
1	Lethwei Grand Prix Japan 2016	October 27, 2016	Korakuen Hall	Tokyo, Japan	

== Lethwei Grand Prix Japan 2016 ==
Lethwei Grand Prix Japan 2016
- Promotion: ILFJ
- Date: October 27, 2016
- Venue: Korakuen Hall
- City: Tokyo, Japan

Event chronology
Lethwei Grand Prix Japan 2016	Lethwei in Japan 2 : Legacy

Lethwei Grand Prix Japan 2016 was the first Lethwei event held by the ILFJ on October 27, 2016, at the Korakuen Hall in Tokyo, Japan.

=== Background ===
This event featured top Lethwei fighters Tun Tun Min, Too Too and Soe Lin Oo to inaugurate the first event of the promotion.

=== Results ===
Lethwei Grand Prix Japan 2016
Weight Class				Method	Round	Time	Notes
Openweight 80 kg	(Myanmar) Tun Tun Min	def.	(Australia) Adem Yilmaz	KO (punches)	5	0:58	
Middleweight 75 kg	(Myanmar) Too Too	-	(Myanmar) Soe Lin Oo	Draw	5	3:00	
Lightweight 70 kg	(Myanmar) Thar A Thae Ta Pwint	-	(Myanmar) Kyal Zin Phyo	Draw	5	3:00	
Lightweight 70 kg	(Myanmar) Saw Al Lay	def.	(Myanmar) Saw Htoo Zaw	TKO (punches)	2	3:00	
Bantamweight 60 kg	(Myanmar) Tun Lwin Moe	-	(Myanmar) Saw Htoo Aung	Draw	5	1:20	

== See also ==
- 2016 in K-1
- 2016 in Kunlun Fight
