= Korakuen Hall =

Arena in Tokyo, Japan

- The Hall
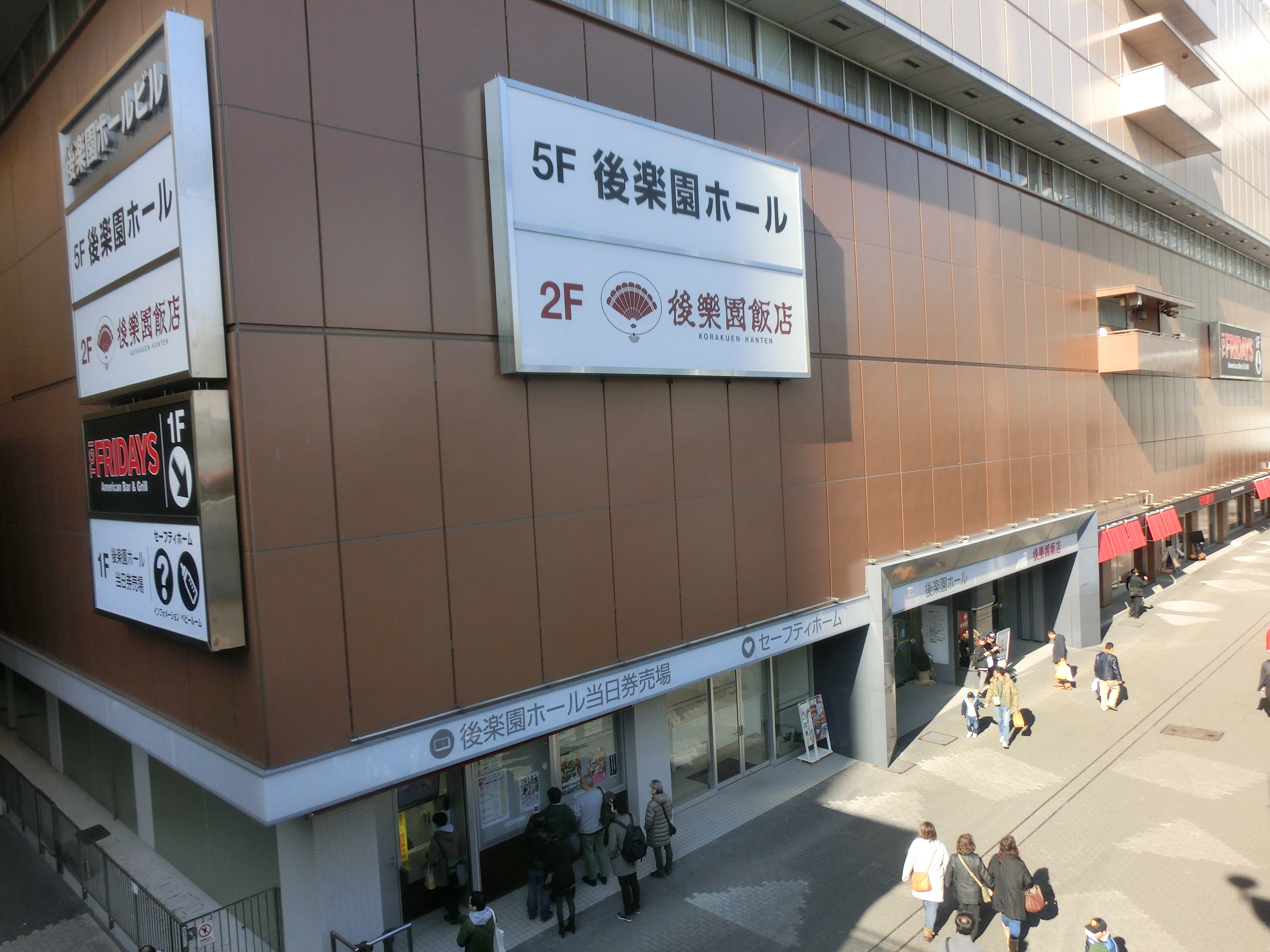
- Interactive map of Korakuen Hall
- Location: Bunkyo, Tokyo, Japan
- Coordinates: 35°42′15.55″N 139°45′6.98″E
- Owner: Tokyo Dome Corporation
- Capacity: 1,403 seat 2,005 seats (maximum)

Construction
- Opened: April 16, 1962

Tenants
- Nippon TV (1962–present); Japan Boxing Commission (1962–present)

Korakuen Hall (Japanese: 後楽園ホール, Hepburn: Kōrakuen Hōru) is a sports arena in Bunkyo, Tokyo, Japan, which has hosted boxing, professional wrestling, kickboxing, mixed martial arts and Lethwei matches.

== History ==
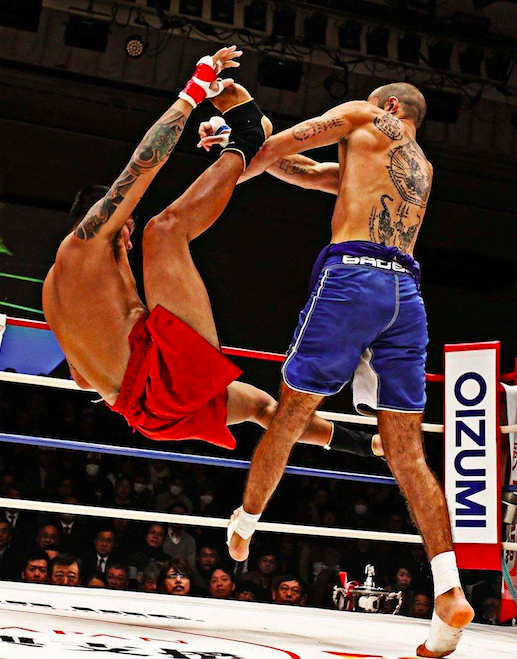
Dave Leduc sweeping opponent at Lethwei in Japan 2 inside the Korakuen Hall.

On April 16, 1962, the Korakuen Hall was officially opened with a capacity of approximately 2,000 people. It is located inside the Tokyo Dome City, one of Tokyo's biggest attractions. The venue hosted the boxing events for the 1964 Summer Olympics.

On March 30, 1993, the Japanese kickboxing promotion K-1 held its first event K-1 Sanctuary I at Korakuen Hall.

On August 11, 1996, Extreme Championship Wrestling (ECW) became the first American promotion to hold a professional wrestling show at the venue with ECW vs. IWA vs. True FMW: Total War, a cross-promotional event with IWA Japan, being the promotion's first show in the country.

In March 2011, as the hall suffered structural damage in the Tōhoku earthquake, events including a World Boxing Council triple female world title fight were postponed or canceled. The repair work was completed on March 18. The Hall was closed until the next day, then gradually resumed a variety of events.

On October 27, 2016, the hall became the chosen venue for the International Lethwei Federation Japan. The Lethwei Grand Prix Japan 2016 was the first event of the promotion held at the venue.

On August 2, 2025, two boxers were gravely injured in separate fights during the Dynamic Glove on U-Next card and died from injuries sustained in those contests days later, resulting in a national edict prohibiting boxing matches from lasting longer than 10 rounds. Officials also planned to adopt Nevada-style weight cutting regulations.

== Tokyo JCB Hall (Korakuen Hall 2) ==
The Tokyo JCB Hall also known Tokyo Dome City Hall is a facility for sports, fashion shows, and live concerts inside the Tokyo Dome City complex, a few minutes walk from the Korakuen Hall. It was announced that a new version of Korakuen Hall would be built in Tokyo Dome City which would act as the Korakuen Hall 2 and it would hold 2,500–3,000 people. The naming rights of the hall were purchased by Japan Credit Bureau (JCB) so it opened as JCB Hall. After the construction completed, the Tokyo Dome Corporation, which owns the original Korakuen Hall as well as the Tokyo Dome, would continue to rent out the original Korakuen Hall, lowering rental prices (currently it costs 1,500,000 Yen to rent) to allowing smaller promotions to use the building on a regular basis.

Although most of the sporting events take place at the Tokyo Dome, the JCB Hall is considered one of the primary spots in Tokyo Dome City for smaller scale sporting events, like boxing, pro-wrestling, Lethwei and mixed martial arts. The JCB Hall hosted Miss International Japan.

Since its completion, JCB Hall has been host of Lethwei in Japan 4, and has been rarely used for pro wrestling events after the Pro Wrestling Zero1 show in early 2008. During 2009, JCB Hall was used twice for pro wrestling, both times for a tour ending show by Pro Wrestling Noah.
