= Wirecutter (website) =

American product review website

- Website type: Product reviews
- Founded: September 2011
- Owner: The New York Times Company
- Founder: Brian Lam
- Editor: Ben Frumin (As of 2020)
- Website: nytimes.com/wirecutter
- Commercial: yes

Wirecutter (formerly known as The Wirecutter) is an American product review website owned by the New York Times Company. It was founded by Brian Lam in 2011 and acquired by The New York Times Company in 2016 for about $30 million.

== Approach and business model ==
Wirecutter is mostly a list of amazing gadgets. [...] The point is to make it easier for you to buy some great gear quickly and get on with your life.

The choices I've made here took days of research and years of experience, interviews, data from the best editorial and user sources around. Most gadgets I choose here aren't the top of the line models that are loaded up with junk features or overpriced; most of the ones we've picked are of the "good enough" or "great enough" variety, because this is generally where our needs and the right prices smash into each other.

These are the same gadgets I'd recommend to my friends and family, and these are the same gadgets I'd choose for myself.

— Brian Lam, Hello! (Oct 2, 2011)

The site focuses on writing detailed guides to various categories of consumer products, recommending only one or two best items per category. It earns most of its revenue from affiliate marketing by including links to its recommendations. To prevent bias, the staff who write the reviews are not informed about what commissions, if any, the site receives for different products. Due to affiliate revenue, the site is less reliant than other blogs and news sites on advertising revenue, although the Wirecutter site has displayed banner ads in the past.

== History ==
Brian Lam founded the site in 2011 after leaving the editor-in-chief position at Gizmodo. It was originally part of The Awl. In the five years from its launch in 2011 to 2016, the company generated $150 million in revenue from affiliate programs with its merchant partners. A sibling site, The Sweethome, launched in 2013 and focused on home goods while The Wirecutter focused on electronics and tools. After forming an editorial partnership with The New York Times in 2015, The Wirecutter was acquired by the Times in October 2016 for a reported $30 million. The Wirecutter and Sweethome were combined into a single site in 2017, a year after the Times acquisition.

Lam announced he had hired Jacqui Cheng as editor-in-chief for The Wirecutter in December 2013. After the Times acquisition, David Perpich was appointed to President and General Manager of The Wirecutter in March 2017. When Cheng stepped down in September 2018, the staff had grown from under 10 to over 100 employees. Ben Frumin succeeded Cheng in December 2018. The Wirecutter Union was formed in 2019 with approximately 65 employees, affiliated with NewsGuild-CWA of New York. By 2020, Wirecutter had approximately 150 employees, with the majority working remotely away from the headquarters in Long Island City.

In August 2021, The New York Times implemented a metered paywall, no longer relying solely on affiliate marketing commissions for revenue. Later that year, Wirecutter staff went on strike. Wirecutter's reporting structure under Perpich was largely independent of the rest of the Times, and the two pay scales were significantly different. The Wirecutter Union reached a three-year agreement with The New York Times Company in December, with immediate wage increases averaging US$5,000 per employee.

In August 2024, The Wirecutter Show, a podcast for Wirecutter, was launched by The New York Times.

Wirecutter has partnered with other websites, including Engadget, to publish company-sponsored guest posts sponsored by the company. In 2015, Amazon tested a partnership with Wirecutter using a similar sponsored-post format on its site for recommendations. While Wirecutter does perform its own testing of products, they also reference other reviews by sites like Ravingtechnology, Topyten, Consumer Reports, Reviewed, CNET, and America's Test Kitchen.

== Reception ==
Wirecutter has been described as a competitor to Consumer Reports, from which it differs by its explicit recommendations of top picks, a younger readership (with average age between 41 and 53 as of 2018), and its acceptance of vendor-supplied test units. Similar recommendation websites that compete with Wirecutter include Best Products (Hearst Communications, 2015), The Strategist (New York, 2016), BuzzFeed Reviews (BuzzFeed, 2018), and The Inventory (G/O Media, 2018).
