= Pattaya Boxing World =

Mauy Thai stadium and promotor

- พัทยาบ็อกซิ่งเวิร์ล
- Interactive map of Pattaya Boxing World
- Address: Pattaya; Thailand
- Location: 387 moo 6 Sukhumwit, Naklua, Chon Buri 20150
- Coordinates: 12°57′20.7″N 100°54′40.9″E
- Seating type: Chair
- Capacity: 600 person
- Type: Muay Thai stadium and promoter
- Event: Martial arts
- Parking: Available

Construction
- Years active: 2012-present

Pattaya Boxing World (Thai: พัทยาบ็อกซิ่งเวิร์ล) is a stadium and organizer of Muay Thai events in Pattaya. The stadium holds Muay Thai competitions every day from 20:00 to 23:00. Pattaya Boxing World is partner of Fairtex Gym.

== See also ==
- Max Muay Thai
- Lumpinee Boxing Stadium
- Rajadamnern Stadium
