= Openweight =

Combat sports weight class

Openweight, also known as Absolute, is an unofficial weight class in combat sports and professional wrestling. It refers to bouts where there is no weight limit and fighters with a dramatic difference in size can compete against each other. It is different from catch weight, where competitors agree to weigh in at a certain amount without an official weight class. While weight classes are usually mandatory now, openweight competition was the norm for combat sports since antiquity and continues into the modern day.

== Boxing ==
Ancient Greek boxing was an openweight competition. Boxing did not use weight classes until being standardized for modern competition, though there continue to be unlimited divisions. Daniel Mendoza was a boxer famous in the 1780s and 90s for regularly fighting and beating taller and heavier challengers before being decisively beaten by John Jackson, who was 4 inches taller and 42 lbs heavier than Mendoza. Bob Fitzsimmons is notable for being the lightest World Heavyweight Champion, weighing just 165 pounds when he won the title.

== Competitive wrestling ==
Although wrestling was contested at the first modern Olympic Games, there were no weight classes until wrestling returned in 1904. The wrestling at the ancient Olympic Games never used weight classes and competitors were simply divided into two categories: men and boys.

Early professional wrestling, which was mostly based on the catch-as-catch-can and Greco-Roman styles, was usually an openweight competition. Heavyweight championships commonly functioned as openweight championships, such as Martin "Farmer" Burns frequently defending the American Heavyweight Championship against challengers outweighing him by 50-100 lbs, or the championship match between 180 lb Evan "Stranger" Lewis and 300 lb Yusuf İsmail.

Though match-fixing led to predetermined results and theatrics that gradually replaced the competitive sport, the legitimate aspects continued into the 1970s as wrestler vs. fan challenges. Originating in 19th century carnivals, wrestlers would challenge locals from the crowd, with the promoter offering cash or a prize if the fan could win or last a certain amount of time. While plants were sometimes used, usually as a set-up to convince a local to compete, matches were mostly shoots that the professionals won, though fans have also been known to win.

Most folk disciplines such as oil wrestling, lutte sénégalaise, Mongolian Bökh, Persian pahlevani, belt wrestling, etc. may rarely utilize weight classes, if ever, unless being standardized for international competition.

== Lethwei ==
In the International Lethwei Federation Japan, Dave Leduc is the Openweight Champion.

== Mixed martial arts ==
Like its ancient Greek ancestor pankration, the sport of mixed martial arts originally had no weight classes, with martial artists of different styles and sizes drawn together to prove which martial art is most effective in unarmed situations. The original King of Pancrase Championship, UFC Superfight Championship, and the first thirteen UFC tournaments were openweight. By the late 1990s, weight classes became common and mandatory in many countries. However, Japan became a bastion of openweight fights, nicknamed "freak show fights," with fighters such as Ikuhisa Minowa and Genki Sudo commonly facing much larger opponents. Not all open-weight fights were "freak shows" however, PRIDE Fighting Championships organized in 2000 a two-night 16-fighter "Grand Prix" (tournament) called the Pride FC: Grand Prix 2000 with the objective of finding "the world's best fighter" and consisted with the top fighters at the time, from 75.75kg (167 lb) Kazushi Sakuraba to 116 kg (255 lb) Mark Kerr. PRIDE did again an open-weight tournament in 2006 with the Pride FC: Grand Prix 2006 which was divided in three separate events instead.

The openweight division in mixed martial arts (MMA) generally groups fighters above 265 lb (120.2 kg).

Road FC currently has an openweight division. Pancrase originally had a super heavyweight division; it was abolished and incorporated into the unlimited division. Deep currently has an openweight division called "Megaton" although the first champion was Yusuke Kawaguchi, who weighed less than 100 kg. The Japan-based mixed martial arts promotion and sanctioning organization ZST has an openweight division. Dream, now defunct, had an openweight division with tournaments called "Super Hulk Tournament - World Superhuman Championship".

=== Professional Champions ===
==== Current Champions ====
This table is not always up to date. Last updated on January 17, 2018.

Organization	Date Won	Champion	Record	Defenses
Road FC	September 24, 2016	(American Samoa) Mighty Mo	12-5 (9KO 3SUB)	2

== Professional wrestling ==
Some professional wrestling promotions have officially designated Openweight Championships (IWGP U-30 Openweight Championship, GHC Openweight Hardcore Championship, NEVER Openweight Championship, KO-D Openweight Championship, MLW National Openweight Championship) while other promotions ignore weight classes to the point that most, if not all of their championships are effectively openweight. For example, the WWE Championship, traditionally promoted as a heavyweight title, has been held by wrestlers billed as weighing as light as 175 lbs., well below the traditional minimum weight for a wrestler to be classed as a heavyweight.

== Judo ==
The All-Japan Judo Championships have been held annually since 1930. Organized by the Kodokan and All Japan Judo Federation, this tournament has only one openweight division. It is part of the Japanese judo triple crown (ja:三冠) alongside the Olympics and World Championships.

The Nanatei Jūdō (ja:七帝柔道, Seven Emperors Judo) tournament has been held annually since 1952. It has no weight classes and a unique ruleset that has drawn comparisons to Brazilian jiu-jitsu.

The IJF held the first World Judo Open Championships for openweight competition in 2008. The World Judo Championships were originally an openweight competition from the first edition in 1956 until the introduction of weight classes in 1965. The Olympics also featured an openweight category from the sport's introduction in 1964 until the 1984 edition.

== Submission grappling and Brazilian jiu-jitsu ==
Absolute divisions are a staple of submission grappling at all levels. All weight categories are welcome inside the absolute division and smaller competitors must rely on skill and technique against larger opponents. Organizations that hold some of the most popular openweight competitions are ADCC (since 1998), IBJJF (gi since 1996 and no-gi since 2007), NAGA, Grapplers Quest, and Quintet.

== Sumo ==
In amateur and international sumo events, as sanctioned by the International Sumo Federation, openweight competitions exist alongside 3-4 weight class competitions. In professional sumo, as organized by the Japan Sumo Association, there are no weight classes and thus is de facto openweight only.
