= Zinkyaik Pagoda =

Notable Buddhist pagoda in Mon State, Myanmar

Zinkyaik
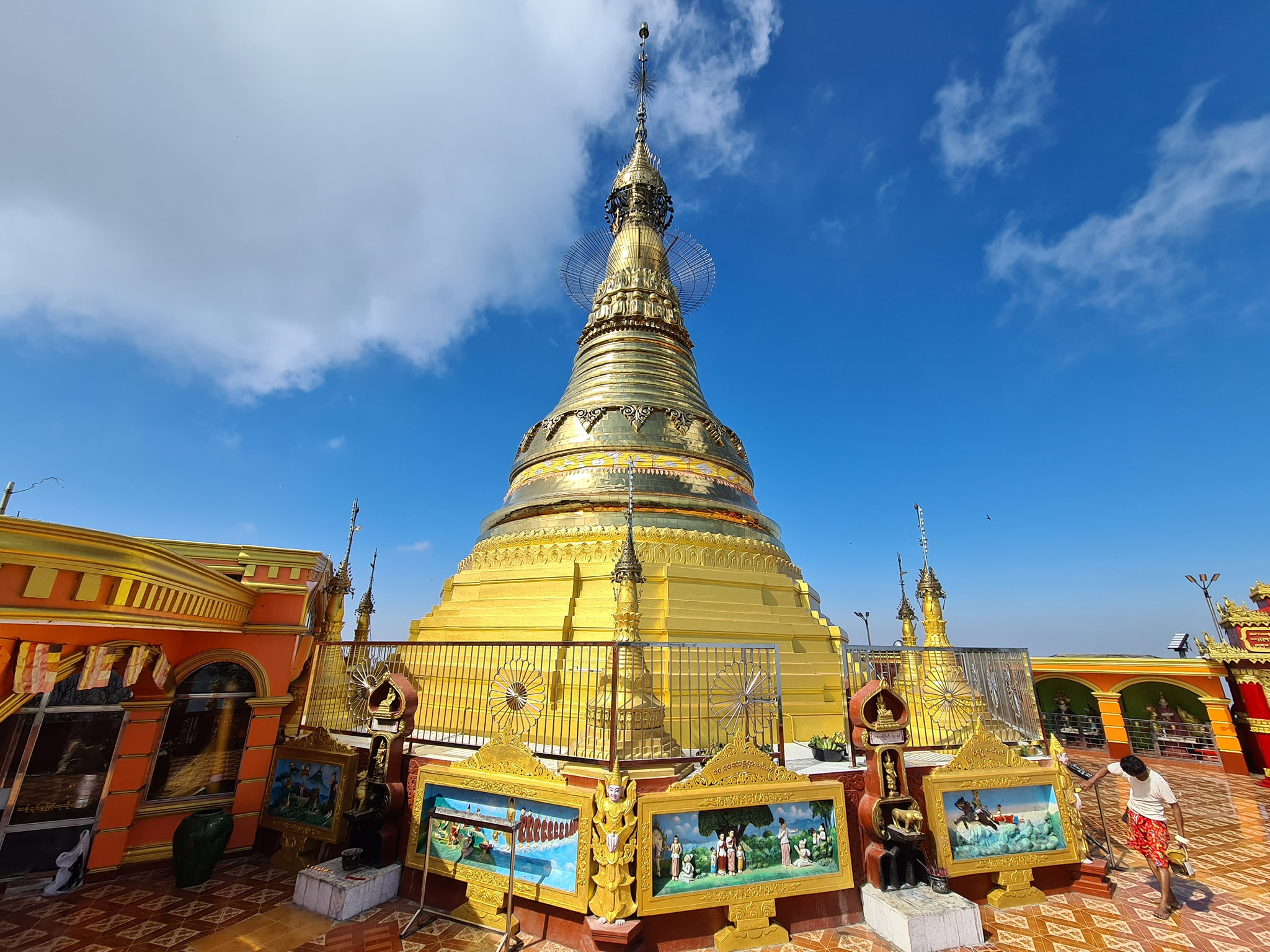
- Entrance of Zin Kyaik Pagoda

Highest point
- Elevation: 3,000 ft (910 m)
- Listing: List of mountains in Myanmar
- Coordinates: 16°42′49″N 97°26′30″E

Geography
- Location within Myanmar
- Location: Mon State, Burma

Climbing
- First ascent: Unknown
- Easiest route: Drive

Zinkyaik Pagoda (Burmese: ဇင်းကျိုက်ဆံတော်ရှင် စေတီတော်မြတ်ကြီး; Mon: ဓါတ်သော်ဂမၠိုၚ် ဇိုၚ်ကျာ်) is a Buddha's Hair Relic Pagoda on top of Zinkyaik Mountain in Mon State, Myanmar.

== Geography ==
Zinkyaik Mountain is located in Mon State along the northern stretch of the Tenasserim coastal region. It can be driven up to by truck due to road construction completed by the late Kyaikhtisaung Sayadaw. The range is part of the Eastern Arakan Yoma Mountains. It is at a distance of 266 kilometres (165 mi) from Yangon and 45 kilometers north of Mawlamyine, the capital of Mon State. The summit is above 3,000 ft. Near the foot of the mountain and located near the main road and rail line of Yangon-Dawei and close to Zinkyaik Village is Zinkyaik Waterfall. The waterfall is frequented by locals, especially during the Full Moon Day of Waso and rainy season. During dry season there is no water to supply the falls and it dries up.

== History ==
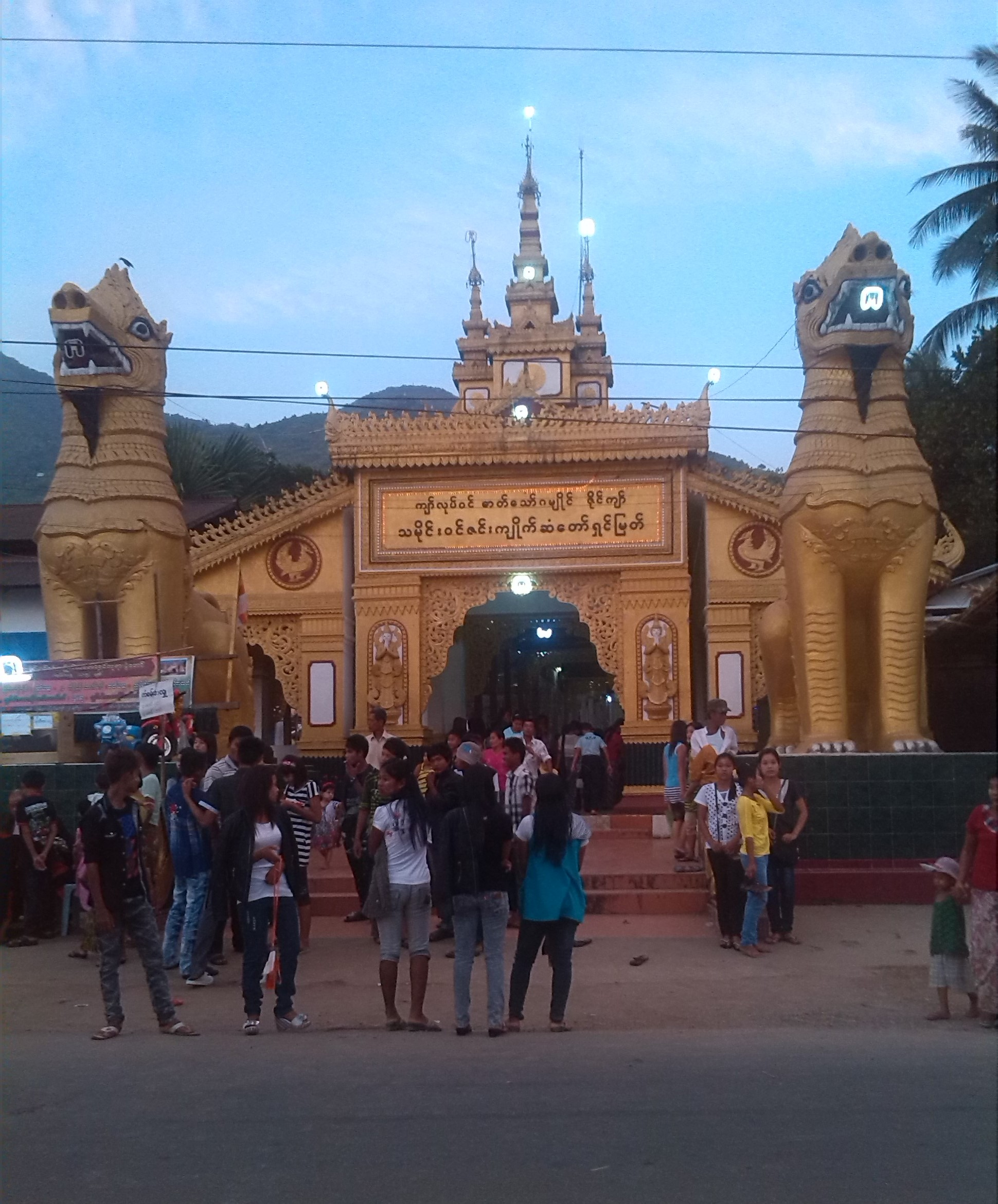

=== Tissa and Thiha ===
Before the Buddha attained enlightenment, there was a kingdom situated near Gisa Gi Yi, now known as Zinkyaik Mountain. The king of this region was Tissa Dama Gyaik and his queen was Thi Yi Kappar Dawi. They ruled the kingdom well, therefore it was calm, rich, and well-developed. The pair had two sons, who had been mentioned before in prophecy by wise men. The oldest son resembled his father in build and appearance. A Brahman had prophesied to King Tissa Dama Yaza that the prince would "have the traits of a moral principles, good character, politeness, cleverness, and great skill." When the king heard this, he was pleased and gave the prince the name Tissa Kumaya, after himself. When the youngest son was born, he was a beautiful child. On both of the soles of his feet, he had markings that looked like lions. So, the king named him Thiha Kumaya.

The two princes loved each other very much. They were raised with access to every kind of sensual pleasure and luxury. The king and queen guarded them against unpleasant dangers such as gnats, mosquitoes, houseflies, and insects. When they reached the ages of 23 and 21 years old, the eldest brother, Tissa Kumaya, who had strong moral principles, had mastered the skill in meditation of remorse. He realized that no being was free from suffering old age, pain, and death. He decided to retire to the forest and become a recluse. He met with his younger brother and discussed his plans for abdicating the throne. He asked his brother to assume the position of king instead of himself and to take care of their parents. The youngest brother decided instead to follow his brother into the forest and also live as a hermit. They agreed to wait for a suitable time to retire to the forest.

When King Tissa Dama Yaza and Queen Thiyi Kappar Dawi reached old age, they decided to retire into meditation and give the throne to their eldest son and the royal title of Crown Prince to their youngest son. They gathered their lawmakers and made legal arrangements for their sons to assume their new positions. The princes denied their inheritances and asked permission to retreat to the jungle as hermits. They requested their parents' blessing many times. The king and queen did not think that their sons were suitable for forest life, since they had been raised in a palace. The two sons became depressed and would not eat. They became very thin. Finally, the king and queen relented and agreed to allow them to go into the forest.

The princes were pleased and began to eat again. After a week, they went to the jungle in a grand procession followed by the king, queen, and public. A monastery was built where there was fresh water and natural food sources for them. This monastery was at the bottom of Zinkyaik Mountain. The two brothers stayed there and were then referred to as "Tissa Hermit" and "Thiha Hermit". Tissa and Thiha were not satisfied to stay together, since there was temptation to waste meditation time in conversing with each other. Therefore, Tissa decide to stay at Zinkyaik while Thiha decided to transfer to Mount Zwegabin, which could be seen from Zinkyaik Mountain.

=== The Twins ===
Local legend has it that two twin brothers, the children of a weizza from the Himalayas and a naga (dragon) princess were abandoned by their mother as eggs on the western base of Zinkyaik Mountain, where there was an island not far from the beach. Tissa, while walking and meditating, found the eggs and carried them back to his monastery at Zinkyaik Mountain. That night, Tissa saw a signal light from Mount Zwegabin from his brother, Thiha. Thiha met Tissa and Tissa gave him one of the eggs. Thiha took one egg to Mount Zwegabin, and one remained with Tissa. Tissa's egg hatched first on top of Zinkyaik Mountain, and later, Thiha's egg on Mount Zwegabin. Tissa named the baby under his care Thuriaya Kumaya because he was born at sunrise. The youngest brother died at the age of ten due to smallpox. Thiha came to raise Thuriaya Kumaya together with Tissa at Zinkyaik Mountain. The hermits became well-known and the area surrounding the mountain became crowded. Therefore, Tissa moved away from Zinkyaik to Kyaikhtiyo Mountain. Thuriaya Kumaya, who was taught meditation and the art of ruling from Tissa, eventually became the first king of Thaton.

=== Buddha Hair Relic ===
The Chakesadhatuvamsa, or chronicle of the six hair relics of the Buddha, was written in Myanmar. The text says that Buddha gave six hairs to disciples at Venuvana in Rajagrha. These were given to 6 bordering countries who had never seen the Buddha. The stories say that when the Buddha came to Mon State to give sermons, he gave six of his hairs to hermits from Kyaiktiyo, Zinkyaik (to Tissa), Mount Zwegabin (to Thiha), Kaylartha, Kuthaerayone and Melan. A pair of belu brothers from Kyaikhtisaung also received a hair. All the hermits and belus enshrined the hair in great stones. Tissa brought his hair to the top of Zinkyaik Mountain and built a pagoda there.

== Restoration ==
The Kyaikhtisaung Sayadaw restored nine Buddha hair relic pagodas during his lifetime, with Zinkyaik Pagoda being one of them. He built a compound around the pagoda and paved a road up to the top. It is now a popular spot for tourists and locals and had a resident abbot and monastery at the summit of the mountain.
