= Hermits Tissa and Thiha =

Tissa Kumaya and Thiha Kumaya were the sons of King Tissa Dama Gyaik and Queen Thi Yi Kappar Dawi, who ruled a kingdom at the base of Zinkyaik Mountain. They were two of six hermits whom Gautama Buddha gave his hair relics to upon his visit to Kaylartha Mountain.

== Early life ==
Before Gautama Buddha attained enlightenment, there was a kingdom situated near Gisa Gi Yi, now known as Zinkyaik Mountain. The king of this region was Tissa Dama Gyaik (and his queen was Thi Yi Kappar Dawi. They ruled the kingdom well, therefore it was calm, rich, and well-developed. The pair had two sons, who had been mentioned before in prophecy by wise men. The oldest son resembled his father in build and appearance. A Brahman had prophesied to King Tissa Dama Yaza that the prince would "have the traits of a moral principles, good character, politeness, cleverness, and great skill." When the king heard this, he was pleased and gave the prince the name Tissa Kumaya, after himself. When the youngest son was born, he was a beautiful child. On both of the soles of his feet, he had markings that looked like lions. So, the king named him Thiha Kumaya. The two princes loved each other very much. They were raised with access to every kind of sensual pleasure and luxury. The king and queen guarded them against unpleasant dangers such as gnats, mosquitoes, houseflies, and insects.

== Decision to become hermits ==
When the brothers reached the ages of 23 and 21 years old, the eldest brother, Tissa Kumaya, who had strong moral principles, had mastered the skill in meditation of remorse. He realized that no being was free from suffering old age, pain, and death. He decided to retire to the forest and become a recluse. He met with his younger brother and discussed his plans for abdicating the throne. He asked his brother to assume the position of king instead of himself and to take care of their parents. The youngest brother decided instead to follow his brother into the forest and also live as a hermit. They agreed to wait for a suitable time to retire to the forest.

When King Tissa Dama Yaza and Queen Thiyi Kappar Dawi reached old age, they decided to retire into meditation and give the throne to their eldest son and the royal title of Crown Prince to their youngest son. They gathered their lawmakers and made legal arrangements for their sons to assume their new positions. The princes denied their inheritances and asked permission to retreat to the jungle as hermits. They requested their parents' blessing many times. The king and queen did not think that their sons were suitable for forest life, since they had been raised in a palace. The two sons became depressed and would not eat. They became very thin. Finally, the king and queen relented and agreed to allow them to go into the forest.

The princes were pleased and began to eat again. After a week, they went to the jungle in a grand procession followed by the king, queen, and public. A monastery was built where there was fresh water and natural food sources for them. This monastery was at the bottom of Zinkyaik Mountain. The two brothers stayed there and were then referred to as "Tissa Hermit" and "Thiha Hermit". Tissa and Thiha were not satisfied to stay together, since there was temptation to waste meditation time in conversing with each other. Therefore, Tissa decide to stay at Zinkyaik while Thiha decided to transfer to Mount Zwegabin, which could be seen from Zinkyaik Mountain.

== Finding the twin eggs ==
Two twin brothers, the children of a weizza from the Himalayas and a naga (dragon) princess were abandoned by their mother as eggs on the western base of Zinkyaik Mountain, where there was an island not far from the beach. Tissa, while walking and meditating, found the eggs and carried them back to his monastery at Zinkyaik Mountain. That night, Tissa saw a signal light from Mount Zwegabin from his brother, Thiha. Thiha met Tissa and Tissa gave him one of the eggs. Thiha took one egg to Mount Zwegabin, and one remained with Tissa. Tissa's egg hatched first on top of Zinkyaik Mountain, and later, Thiha's egg on Mount Zwegabin. Tissa named the baby under his care Thuriaya Kumaya because he was born at sunrise. The youngest twin brother died at the age of ten due to smallpox. So, Thiha came to raise Thuriaya Kumaya together with Tissa at Zinkyaik Mountain.

== Tissa leaves Zinkyaik Mountain ==
The hermits became well-known and the area surrounding the mountain became crowded. Therefore, Tissa moved away from Zinkyaik to Kyaikhtiyo Mountain to find seclusion once again. The area appealed to him because it was surrounded by fresh water, hills, valleys, mountain torrents, trees, fruits, flowers, and stones. He lived in the Hunter's Cave and lost touch with all of civilization, except Thuriaya Kumaya, who went to live with his adopted father and Thiha, who occasionally travelled to visit him.

== Tissa and Thuriaya Kumaya ==
Tissa grew attached to his adopted son and taught him about strategies for ruling a kingdom when they were not meditating. Since Thuriaya Kumaya was born from the egg of a weizza and dragon, he was called the "Naga Weizza". Tissa began to worry about his adopted son being left alone in the jungle after his death. One Sabbath day, Indra Sakka, a Thagyarmin, asked Tissa why he looked concerned. Tissa replied that he was worried about his son. The Indra Sakka said that when he reached 21 years old, the boy would become the emperor of Thu Bina Nagaya City, which the Tha Gyarmin would create. Tissa was satisfied after that.

== Death of King Tissa Dama Yaza and move of kingdom ==
When their sons, Tissa and Thiha, had left, King Tissa Dama Yaza and Queen Thi Yi Kuppar suffered greatly. Their mental and physical health deteriorated, and they became thin. The king finally succumbed to his grief in the Maha Era 110. There was no one to inherit the throne, so the court officials went to the hermits to notify them of their father's death and ask them to take over in his place. They replied that they disliked the thought of ruling even more in their old age than when they were young. They stated that they preferred the wealth of mediation and mind than the wealth of the kingdom. In their place, they offered their adopted son, Thuriaya Kumaya, who had been trained in courtly affairs. This pleased the court and was made to pass. The two hermits arrived back to their kingdom to cremate and bury their father's remains. They discussed the kingdom with the officials and whether to move the kingdom or stay in their current location. Indra Sakka arrived and suggested Thaton. Thus, the kingdom was moved to Thaton and Thuriaya Kumaya became the first king of Thaton. The Naga Weizza was given the title Tissa Dama Thiya Yazar.

== The arrival of the Buddha ==
In the Tharthanar Era (111), Gautama Buddha arrived at Kaylartha Mountain, Thuwunna Bonmi. He stayed at a monastery built by King Tissa Dama Thiya Yazar. The Buddha preached sermons to the public for seven days. During that time, he became close with the Hermits Tissa and Thiha and the local hermit of Kaylartha Mountain. They requested that he leave behind some relic to be revered by the people in his place after he left to return home. Buddha agreed and gave six of his hairs to hermits from Kyaiktiyo, Zinkyaik (to Tissa), Mount Zwegabin (to Thiha), Kaylartha, Kuthaerayone and Melan. A pair of belu brothers from Kyaikhtisaung also received a hair. All the hermits and belus enshrined the hair in great stones.
