= Kaylartha Pagoda =

Myanmar sacred Buddhist site

Kaylartha
- Location within Myanmar

Highest point
- Elevation: 1,600 ft (490 m)
- Prominence: 2,148 m (7,047 ft)
- Listing: List of mountains in Myanmar
- Coordinates: 17°13′38″N 97°04′51″E

Geography
- Location: Mon State, Burma

Climbing
- First ascent: Unknown
- Easiest route: Drive

Kaylartha Pagoda (Burmese: ကေလာသစေတီတော်) is a Buddhist Pagoda that sits atop the summit of Mount Kaylartha in Mon State, Myanmar. Local legend claims that at the foot of Kaylartha Mountain sat the ancient Kingdom of Gold.

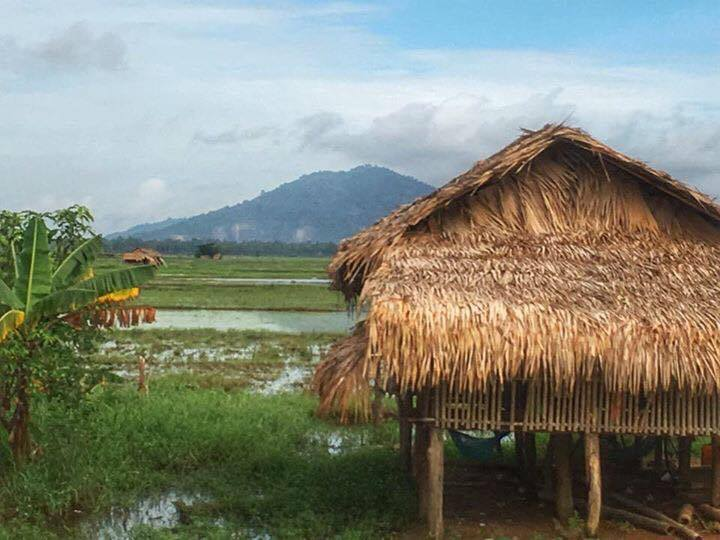
Village home with a view of Kaylartha Mountain

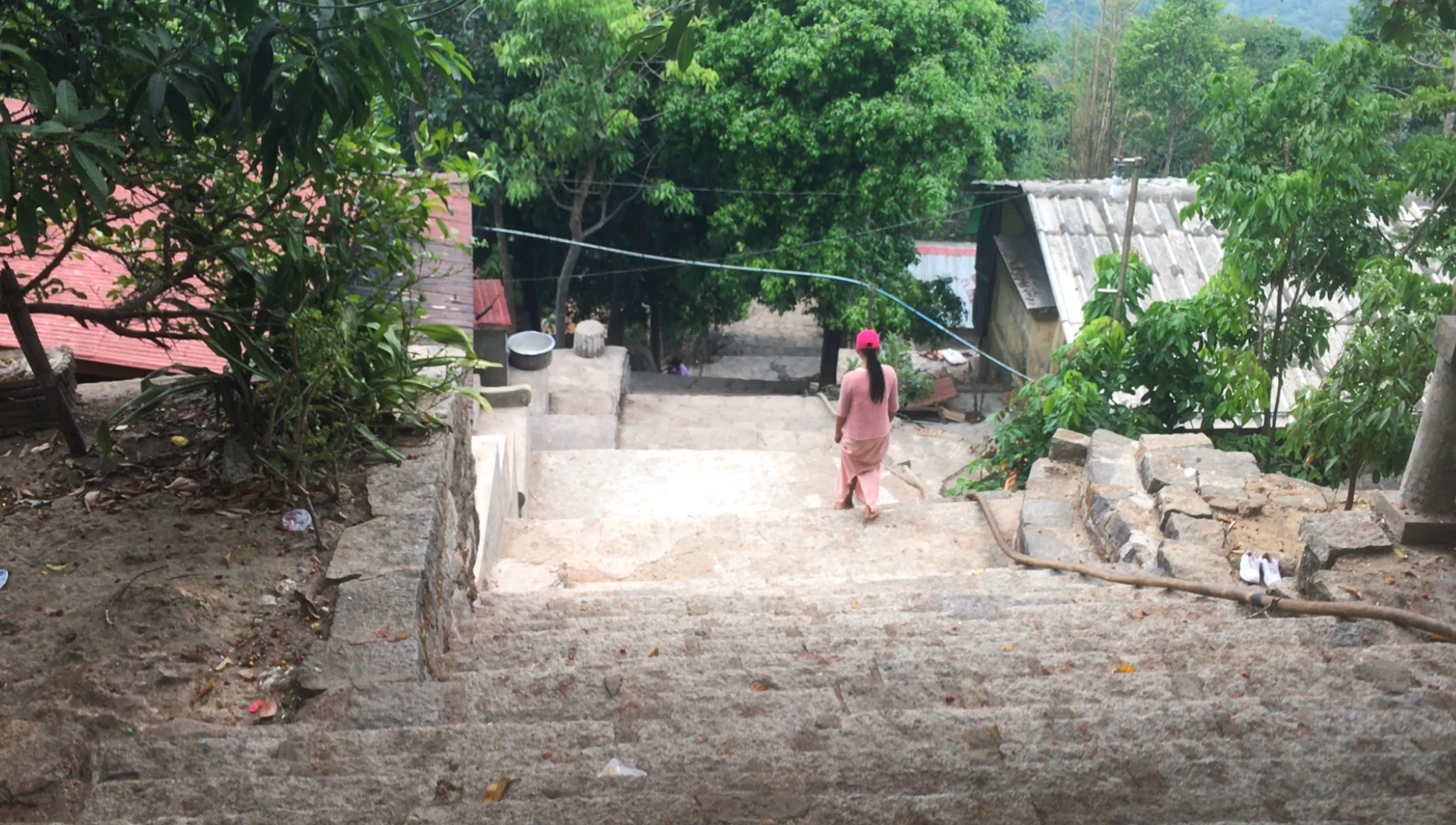
A view of the steps that lead up to Kaylartha Pagoda. To the right is the monastic kitchen where nuns cook and serve breakfast and lunch to the monks and visitors.

== Geography ==
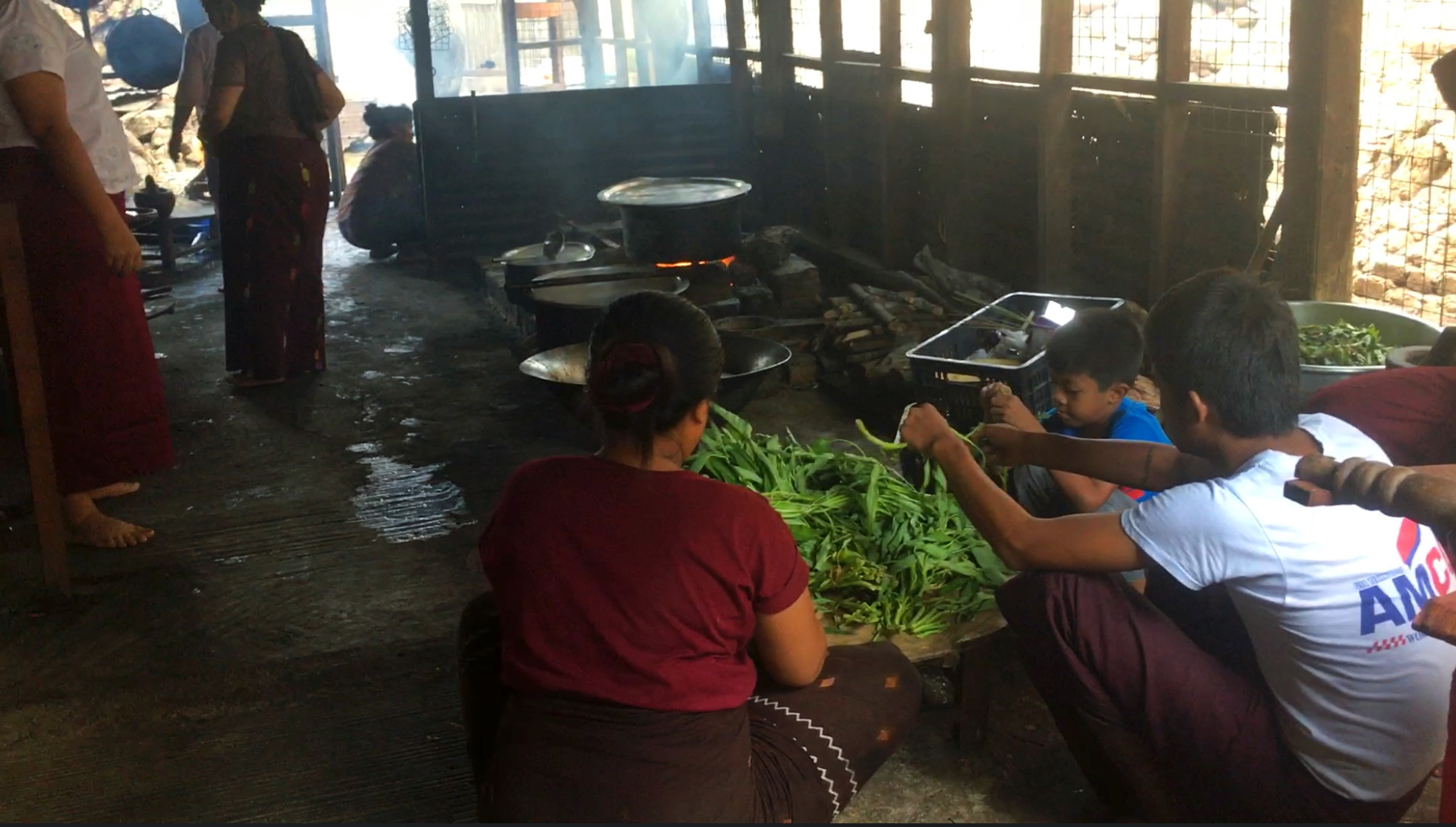
Kaylartha Kitchen

Kaylartha Mountain is situated 3 miles (4.8 km) from Taungson, Mon State, and can be driven by truck. The range is part of the Eastern Arakan Yoma Mountains. It is at a distance of 184 kilometres (114 mi) from Yangon and 136 kilometers north of Mawlamyine, the capital of Mon State. The summit is above 1,600 feet (490 m). Monkeys live atop the mountain and are fed by pilgrims.

The Pagoda and surrounding monasteries are located within the Kelatha Wildlife Sanctuary.

== History ==
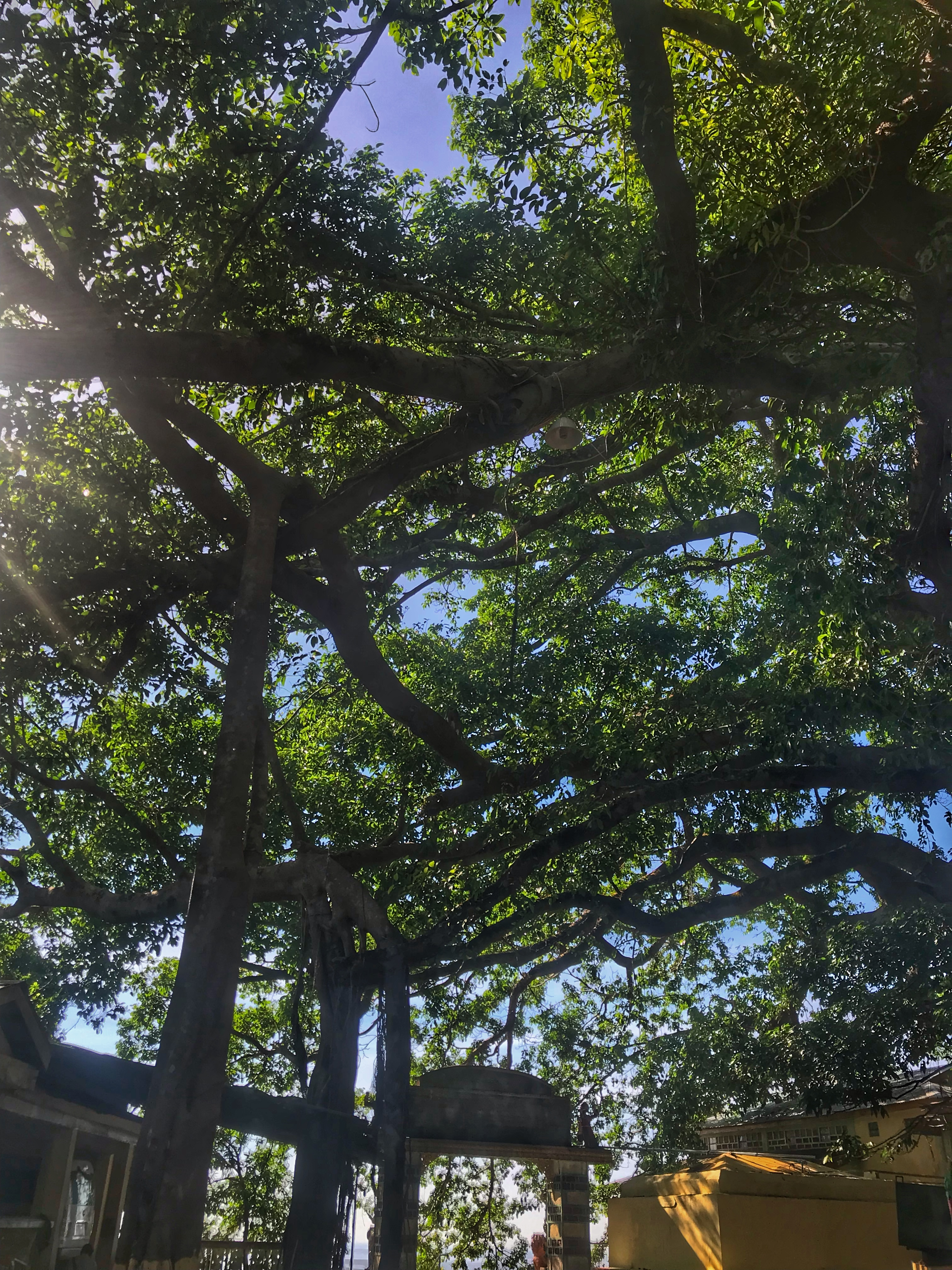
Canopy of ancient Bodhi Tree atop Kaylartha Mountain in Mon State, Myanmar

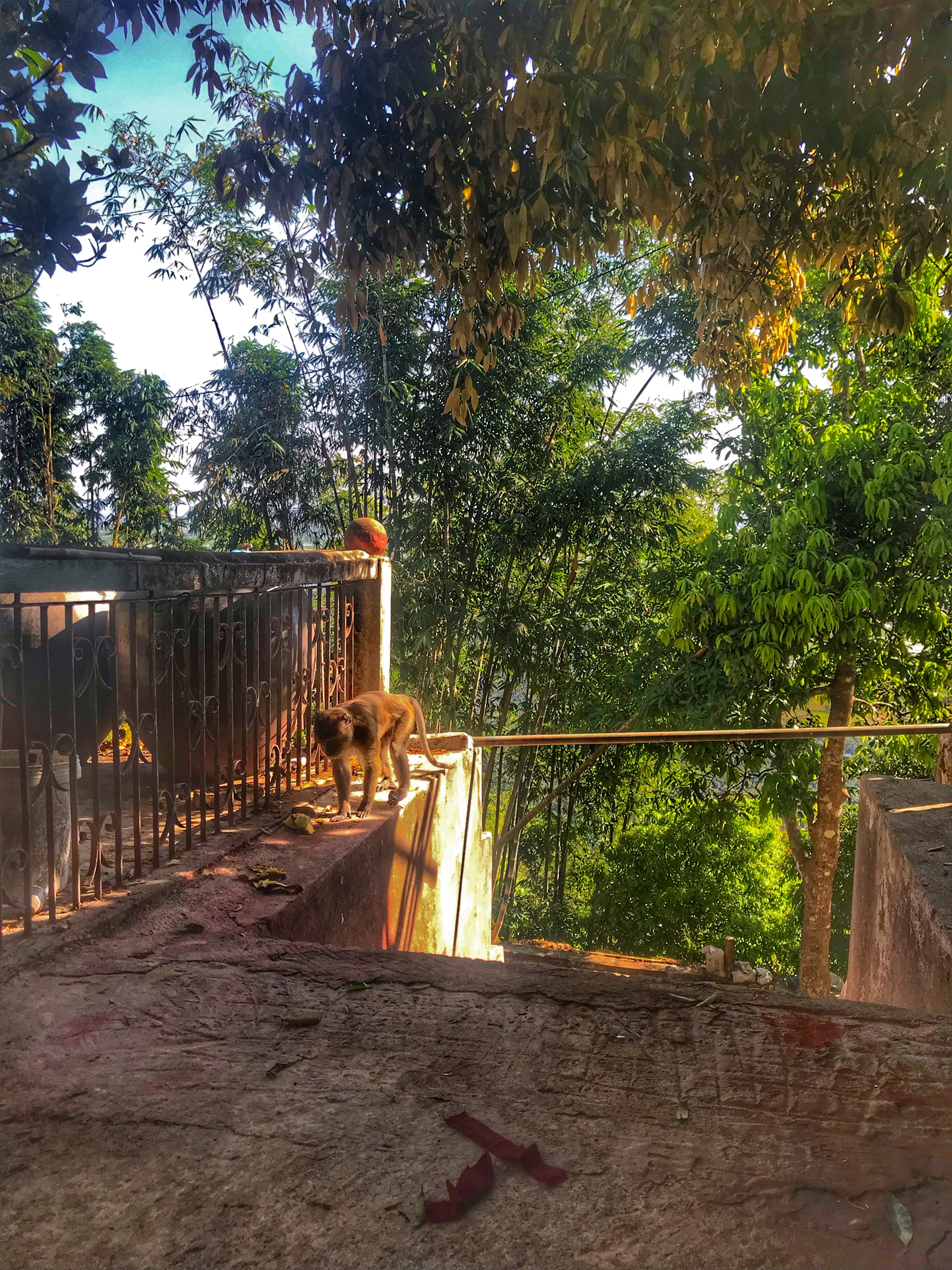
Monkey searching for food near the Kaylartha Monastery, December 2018

At the top of Mount Kaylartha stands a pagoda said to house the hair of Gautama Buddha. It is believed that in the Tharthanar Era (111), The Buddha arrived at the Kaylartha Mountain, Thuwunna Bonmi. He stayed at a monastery built by King Tissa Dama Thiha Yaza. The Buddha preached sermons to the public for seven days. During that time, he became close with the Hermits Tissa and Thiha and the local hermit of Kaylartha Mountain. They requested that he leave behind some relic to be revered by the people in his place after he left to return home. The Buddha agreed and gave six of his hairs to hermits from Kyaiktiyo, Zinkyaik (to Tissa), Mount Zwegabin (to Thiha), Kaylartha, Kuthaerayone and Melan. A pair of belu brothers from Kyaikhtisaung also received a hair. All the hermits and belus enshrined the hair in great stones.

The Hermit of Kaylartha, whose name was Tila of Dokkhalun, discussed how to go about enshrining the hairs and building pagodas around them with Hermits Tissa and Thiha and Indra Sakka, who had supported Thiha in constructing a pagoda on Mount Zwegabin. He enshrined the hair relic in the pagoda atop Kaylartha Mountain, and was advised by Indra Sakka.

The hermits communicated with each other by shining lights atop their respective mountains at night-time. Tissa, who stayed atop Zinkyaik Mountain, did not see the light coming from Mountain Kaylartha and wondered what might have occurred. He went to Kaylartha Mountain and found the body of the Kaylartha Hermit. The body was burnt and buried, while the head, which was not burnt nor decomposed, held one of Buddha's hairs in its braid. It was returned to Mok Soe Taung Pagoda and joined the original two hair relics there.

== Restoration ==
The Kyaikhtisaung Sayadaw restored nine Buddha hair relic pagodas during his lifetime, with Kaylartha Pagoda being one of them. He built a compound around the pagoda and paved a road up to the top. It is now a popular spot for tourists and locals and had a resident abbot and monastery at the summit of the mountain.

== Mining ==
In 2016, a rock and quarry project aimed at producing rock suitable for road paving was suspended on Kaylatha Mountain. On October 19, the Hluttaw state representative of Belin Township Constituency No. 1, Dr. Khin Naing Oo, sent a letter of opposition regarding the preparation for a mining project on the forest reserve to the President and various other respective government departments. The project was headed by Rock Well Mining Co., Ltd.. Ohn Win, the Ministry of Natural Resources and Environmental Conservation, visited the area nine days later on October 28. He witnessed the field work taking place and decided to suspend the work. A temporary ban was placed on mining on the historic site. Eventually, quarry projects were permitted to operate only along the boundaries of the Kaylartha Wildlife Sanctuary (450 acres of land) as they had historically been quarry sites.
