= U Khandi =

Burmese Buddhist hermit

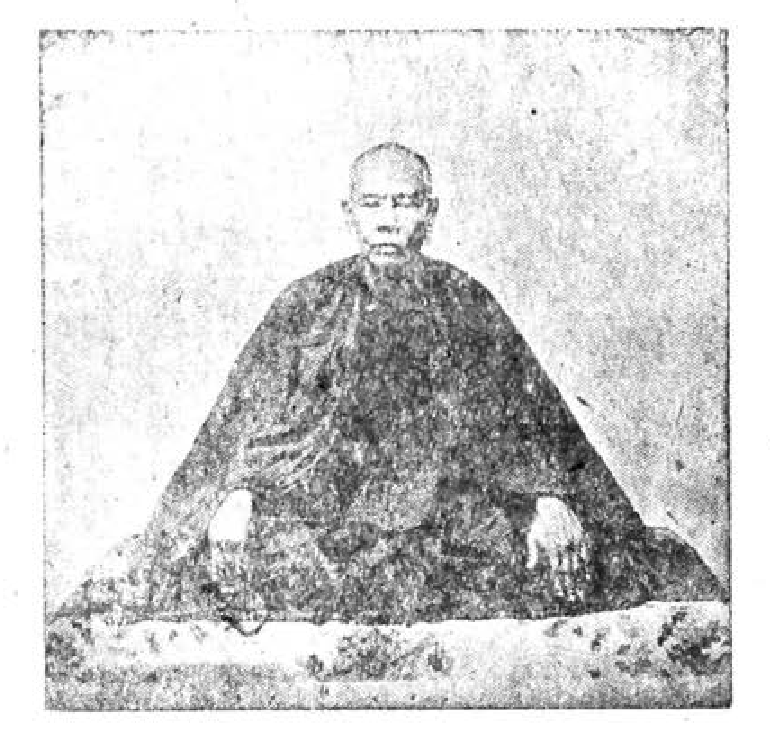
- Title: hermit, weizza

Personal life
- Born: Po Maung; 1868 Ywathaya village, Yamethin District, Kingdom of Myanmar
- Died: 14 January 1949 (aged 80–81)

Religious life
- Religion: Buddhism
- School: Theravada

U Khandi (1868 – 14 January 1949) was a Burmese hermit known for his works on Buddhist pagodas and other religious buildings in Myanmar. U Khandi maintained the Mandalay Hill and organised many religious activities for 40 years.

== Early life ==
U Khandi was born Maung Po Maung in Ywathaya Village, Yamethin District in 1868.

== Hermit life ==
U Khandi became hermit in 1900 and meditated at the Mandalay Thakho hill and Shwe-myin-tin hill. His goodwill organisation completed construction and renovation of several building pagodas and religious buildings at hilltops, such as those on the Kyaiktiyo Pagoda and at Taung Kalat.

His work was not only recognised by the Burmese people but also the colonial British government, which gave him and his followers’ special privileges such as free travel certificates and work permits. U Khandi suffered minor paralysis for three years and died on 14 January 1949. Two years later funeral celebrations were held and he was cremated.

== Contributions and Life Work ==
=== Stone Inscriptions ===
U Khandi performed vast renovation projects throughout Myanmar during his lifetime, with a focus on remote hills and forest areas. One of his projects was to copy the Tripitakas donated by King Mindon onto marble slabs. In M.E. 1275 [C.E. 1913], in the compound of Sandamuni Pagoda, U Khandi inscribed Sutta, Vinaya and Abhidhamma from the Tipitaka. He included complete explanations on 1,772 stone slabs, as well as inscribing a historical record on an iron sheet and a stone slab.

These stone slabs are:

1. Vinaya Pitaka – 395 slabs
2. Sutta Pitaka – 1,207 slabs
3. Abhidhamma Pitaka – 170 slabs

On 3 March 2011, the Kyaikhtisaung Sayadaw had 135 of the stone inscriptions brought to the Kyaikhtisaung Compound from Mandalay Hill.

=== Buddha Relics ===
The Peshawar Relics ( three fragments of bone of the Gautama Buddha) were kept in his dazaung from 1923 until after the Second World War when they were moved to a building at the foot of the hill and no longer on display.

=== Sandamuni Pagoda ===
The Dhamma Cetis of Sandamuni Pagoda were built several decades after the central zedi in 1913 by U Khandi.
