= Bilin Township =

Coordinates: 17.2333°N 97.2500°E

Bilin Township ဘီးလင်းမြို့နယ်
- Township
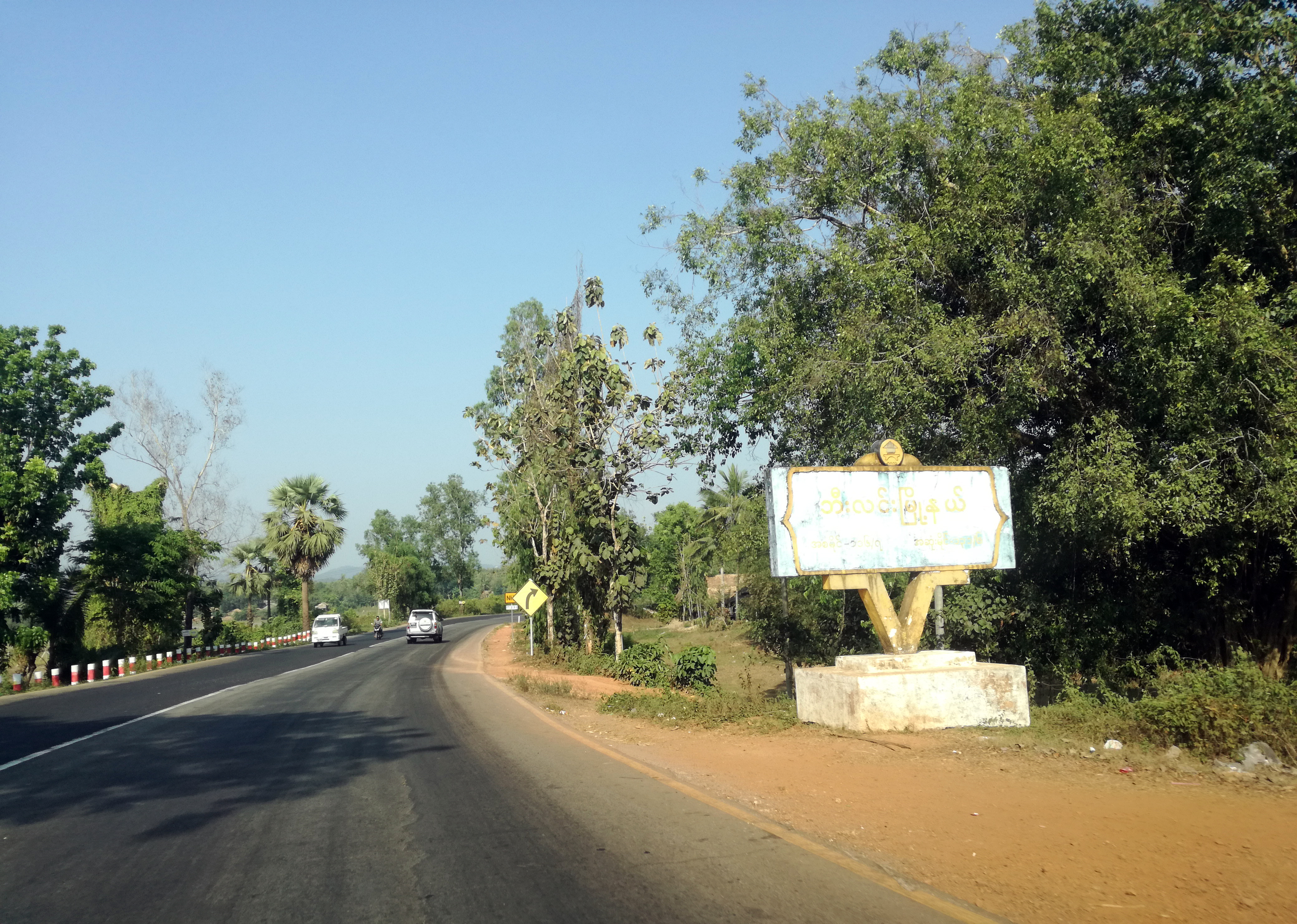

- Location in Kyaiktodistrict
- Country: Myanmar
- State: Mon State
- District: Kyaikto District
- Capital: Bilin
- Time zone: UTC+6:30 (MST)

Bilin Township (Burmese: ဘီးလင်းမြို့နယ်) is a township of Kyaikto District in the Mon State of Myanmar. Its seat is the town of Bilin. The Kelatha Wildlife Sanctuary is located 32 km from the Belin town. The Kaylartha Pagoda and monastery is visited by large number of pilgrims every year.
