= Kyaikhtisaung Sayadaw =

Burmese monk (1928–2015)

- ကျိုက်ထီးဆောင်းဆရာတော်
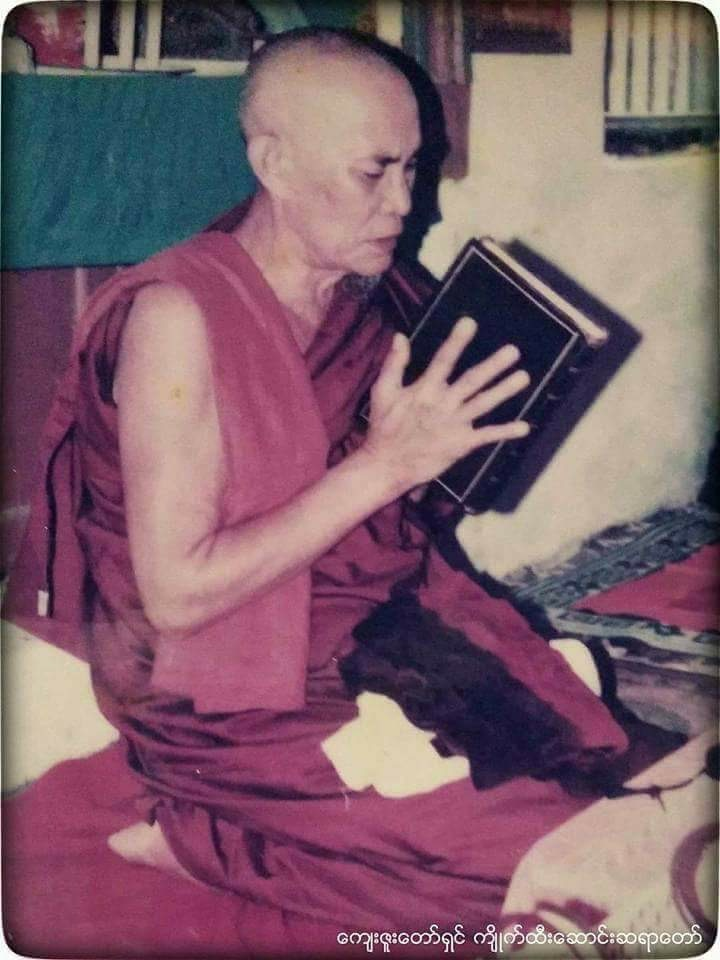
- The Kyaikhtisaung Sayadaw teaching Dhamma
- Title: Sayadaw

Personal life
- Born: 19 April 1928 Bilin, British Burma
- Died: 25 July 2015 (aged 87) Yangon

Religious life
- Religion: Buddhism
- School: Theravada
- Dharma name: Paññādīpa

Senior posting
- Based in: Myanmar
- Successor: The Second Sayadaw of Kyaikhtisaung, Bhaddanta Nargadipa

The Kyaikhtisaung Sayadaw (Burmese: ကျိုက်ထီးဆောင်းဆရာတော်; 19 April 1928 – 25 July 2015) was a prominent Buddhist monk and weizza from Myanmar. Throughout his life, he restored nine Buddha Hair Relic Pagodas across the country, most of which were in Mon State.

== Early life ==
The third of four siblings, the Venerable Paññādīpa was born on 19 April 1928 in Bilin’s Zoke Thoke Sanpya village. His name at birth was Aung Nyein. His father was San Pe and his mother was Saw Kyin. When he was five years old, he was sent to the Nyaungthaya Monastery in Zoke Thoke. There he received a monastic education as per Burmese Buddhist tradition. The abbot of the monastery was Sayadaw U Gandama. At the age of twenty, he set off for Yangon, then called Rangoon. He studied mechanics and began to work for A War Shin, Co. as a driver mechanic.

== Marriages ==
After working for three years as a driver mechanic, Aung Nyein married Hnin Myaing, the daughter of an auto parts shop owner. Together they had one child, a son. They were married for two years before they divorced due to pressures from their family. Their son was only six months old at the time.

He married again, this time to Tin Kyi, the sister of one of his intimate friends. Together they had three children. He eventually worked and saved enough to buy his own taxi car and began working as an owner/driver. In his spare time, he worked as a mechanic. It was at this time that he began observing the Uposatha days and following nine precepts. He provided transport free of charge to monks, the sick, and the elderly.

== Five Spiritual Phases ==
=== First Phase: White-Robed Religious Devotee ===
Beginning in the summer of 1963, Aung Nyein began to study occult science from Manomaya Saya Khine. He practiced spiritual development at Naungdawgyi Pagoda, Shwedagon Pagoda, Shinmahti Pagoda, and Kyaikkasan Pagoda. He wore the clothes of a layman and continued this path continuously until 1965. He began to study manomaya, a form of mind cultivation. He was said to have gained psychic power at this time and referred to it as his "Sovereign Stage, Master of Sovereign Stage, White Robe Religious Devotee Stage".

=== Second Phase: Mystic ===
Between 1966 and 1968, Aung Nyein adopted a distinctive ascetic lifestyle, characterized by long hair, bare feet, and traditional white attire, to align himself with the image of a mystic seeker. During this period, he pursued spiritual studies at ancient pagodas and historical religious sites across the country. His focus was on personal spiritual development, which he cultivated through the observation of internal and external signs, as well as the study of astrology. He referred to this phase of his life as his "Lunatic Stage." Notably, he refrained from soliciting donations during this time.

=== The Third Phase: Ascetic ===
In 1969, Aung Nyein made a decision to continue his practices in the future and arranged for the living of his family. He donned the robes of a hermit and became a recluse. He began to study the way of the weizza, a type of wizardry consisting of the study of alchemy, astrology, mystical signs and meditation. He was said to have gained psychic and supernatural power, including the ability to turn water into medicine. At this time he earned the reputation as Moemakha recluse because it was said that he could keep dry during rain. This period lasted until 1971.

After the third phase was complete, he was known as the Hermit Naga Weizza Bho Sacca or Recluse Nagavijja Bothitsa.

=== The Fourth Phase: Meditation ===
Aung Nyein had spent nine years practicing and gaining proficiency in the aforesaid arts. In 1971, he went back to Zoke Thoke village. On the 1st Waxing Day of Kason 1333 ME, he was fully ordained to monkhood at 7:50 am on Thursday (25 April 1971) at Khanda Sima (ordination hall). He was then named U Pannadipa. His preceptor for ordination was U Indasabha of Naungdawgyi Monastery of Zoke Thoke. His father San Pe and mother Saw Kyin were present and supported him by providing his four requisites: clothing, food, shelter, and medicine.

He took up residency at Kyaikhtisaung Pagoda. The old pagoda was in disrepair and hidden under heavy growth. He organized his disciples and local villagers to clear the area. Once the area was cleared, he rebuilt and renovated the old pagoda and old laterite hillock.

=== The Fifth Phase: The Dipa Stage and His Exertions ===
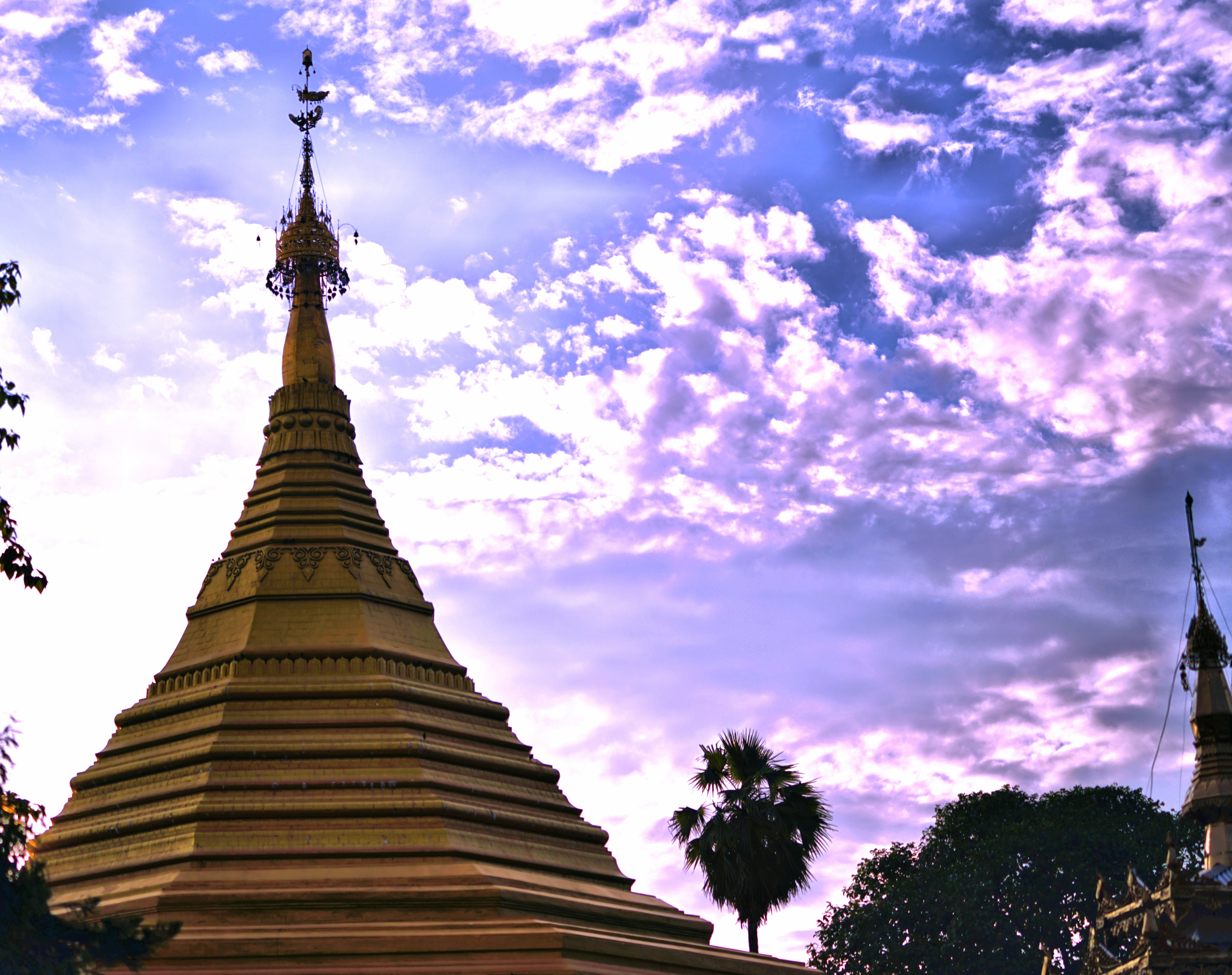
Kyaikhtisaung Stupa

Soon after becoming a monk, U Pannadipa began to teach the Five Precepts, the Five Great Infinities, and the Five Forbidden Meats. He urged his followers to abstain from beef, pork, buffalo, horse, and elephant meat. This became known by his followers as the "Triple Five"' or "5-5-5". He discussed these matters nightly during Dhammapalin (nightly sermons), which lasted from 9:00pm, until 2:00am the next morning. These were open talks where he often received and answered questions from his devotees.

For the next forty years, he set about restoring nine sacred pagodas throughout Myanmar, each claimed to contain preserved hair from Gautama Buddha. It is said that Buddha himself mentioned this in a prophecy when he gave strands of his hair to hermits and belus during a trip to the area. The claim is that he prophesied that after his hairs would be placed in nine pagodas, then abandoned for 2,500 years. After that, the pagodas would be found and restored. He further said that his teachings would then be observed zealously for another 2,500 years. Since the Kyaikhtisaung Sayadaw started his project 2,515 years after Buddha's death, he is said to be the one to fulfill the prophecy.

== Notable work ==
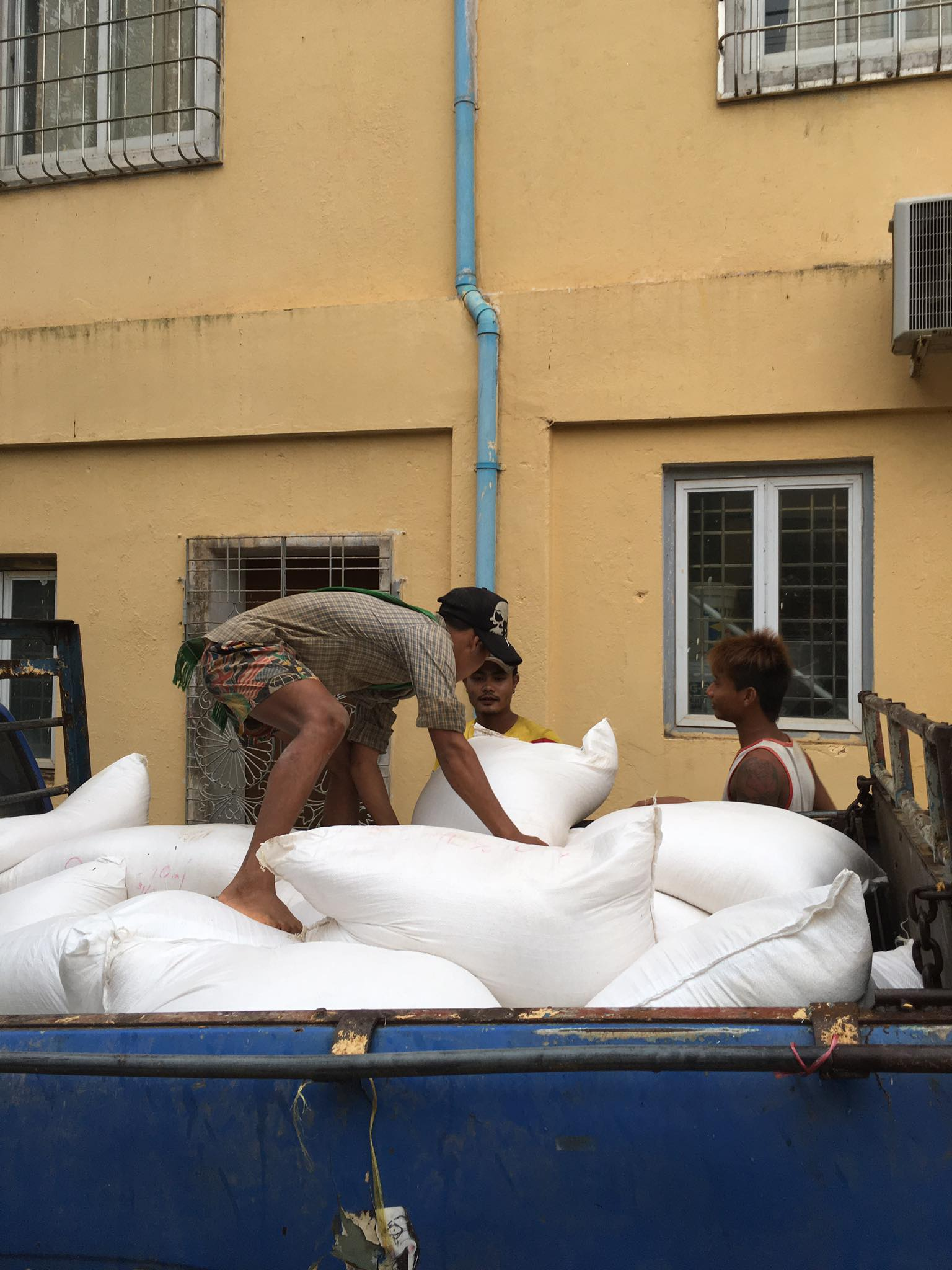
Rice donation to Kyaikhtisaung

The Kyaikhtisaung Sayadaw went on to improve the areas and villages around the pagoda. Under his care, rural roads and bridges were built and local schools were renovated. He provided free vegetarian meals to those who assisted in the restoration projects, guests from afar, and anyone who was seeking shelter at the pagoda for religious study. He distributed money, prayer books, meditation rosaries, and amulets to seekers who visited him. As a result of his charities, the region became a more developed area.

=== Stone Inscriptions of U Khanti ===
On 3 March 2011, the Kyaikhtisaung Sayadaw had 135 of the stone inscriptions made by the Hermit U Khanti brought to the Kyaikhtisaung compound from Mandalay Hill.

=== The Dhammazedi Bell ===
In 2013, Myanmar Tycoon Khin Shwe worked together with the Kyaikhtisaung Sayadaw to try to raise the Dhammazedi Bell from the Yangon River. The bell had been commissioned by King Dhammazedi in 1484 as a gift to the Shwedagon Pagoda of Dagon (Yangon).

=== Honorary Titles ===
Ashin Pannadipa was given the title "Agga Maha Saddhammajotikadhaja" by the Myanmar Ministry of Religious Affairs in 1992 in recognition of his service. This title is reserved for those who have contributed outstanding service to the propagation of the Sasana around the world. Later, in 2004, the ministry again conferred the honorary religious title of "Abhidhaja Agga Maha Saddhammajotikadhaja".

In May 2014, when he was eighty-six years old, he was awarded an Honorary Doctorate Degree in Buddhist Studies by the Mahachulalongkon Rajavidyalaya University in Thailand.

== Resolute Aspirations of Venerable Kyaithisaung Sayadaw ==
1. "May the Suvannabhumi Sasana, the Golden Land of Myanmar, exist extensively, akin to the sun and moon."
2. "May human beings all over the world be able to develop and share great loving kindness."
3. "May Buddhism of the Golden Land of Myanmar brighten the world like the light of the sun and moon."
4. "May the Buddha’s teachings have lasting significance, achieving the fulfillment of 5,000 years."

== Death ==
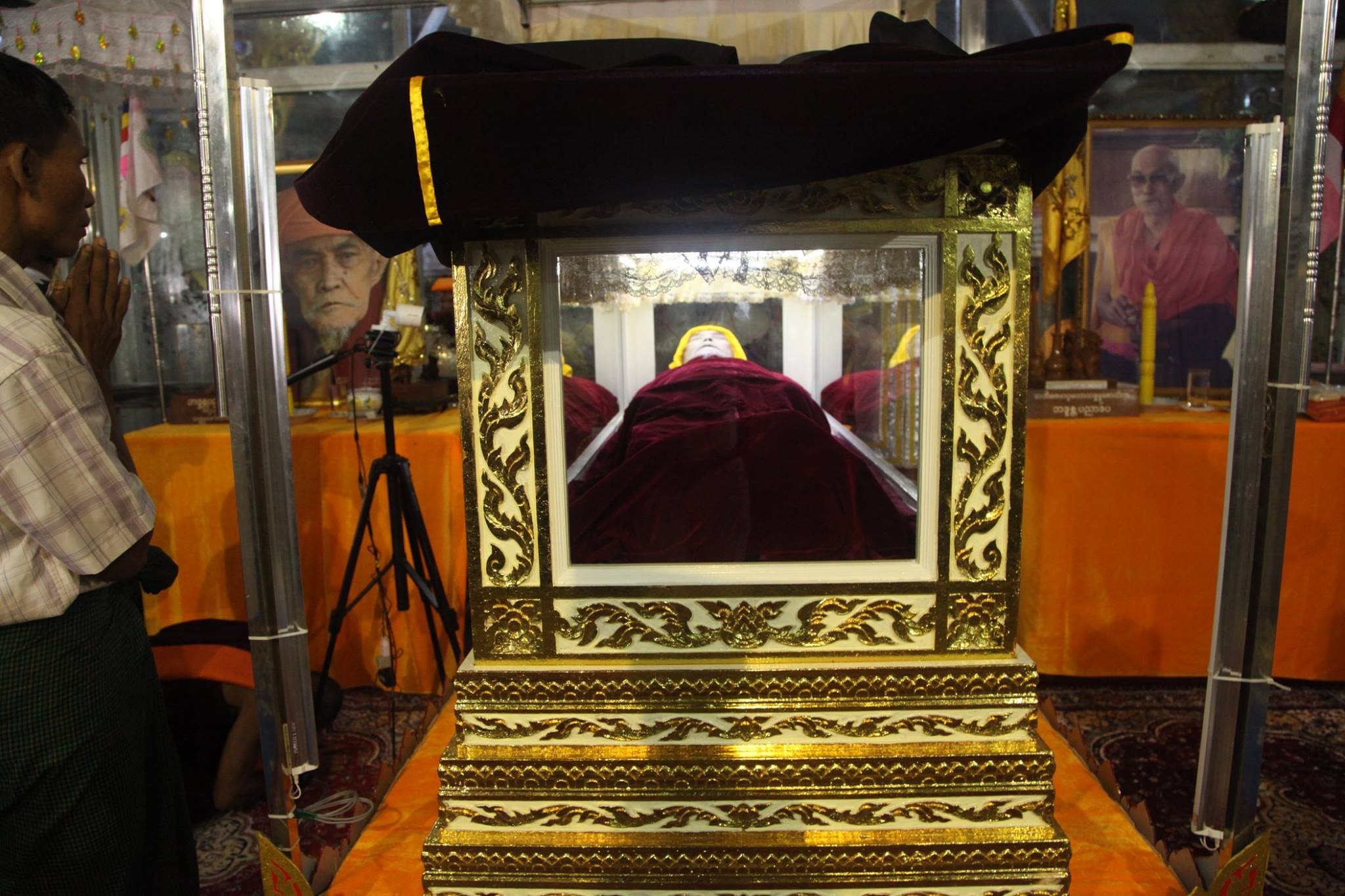
The Glass Coffin of the Kyaikhtisaung Sayadaw

The Kyaikhtisaung Sayadaw died on 25 July 2015 at the age of 87 at Yangon's 1000-bed military hospital in Mingaladon Township. Four days prior, he had been admitted due to heart problems and difficulty breathing. Upon his death, the Kyaikhtisayadaw was succeeded by the abbot Bhaddanta Nargadipa.
