= Bilin, Myanmar =

Bilin ၜဳက္လေၚ်
- Town
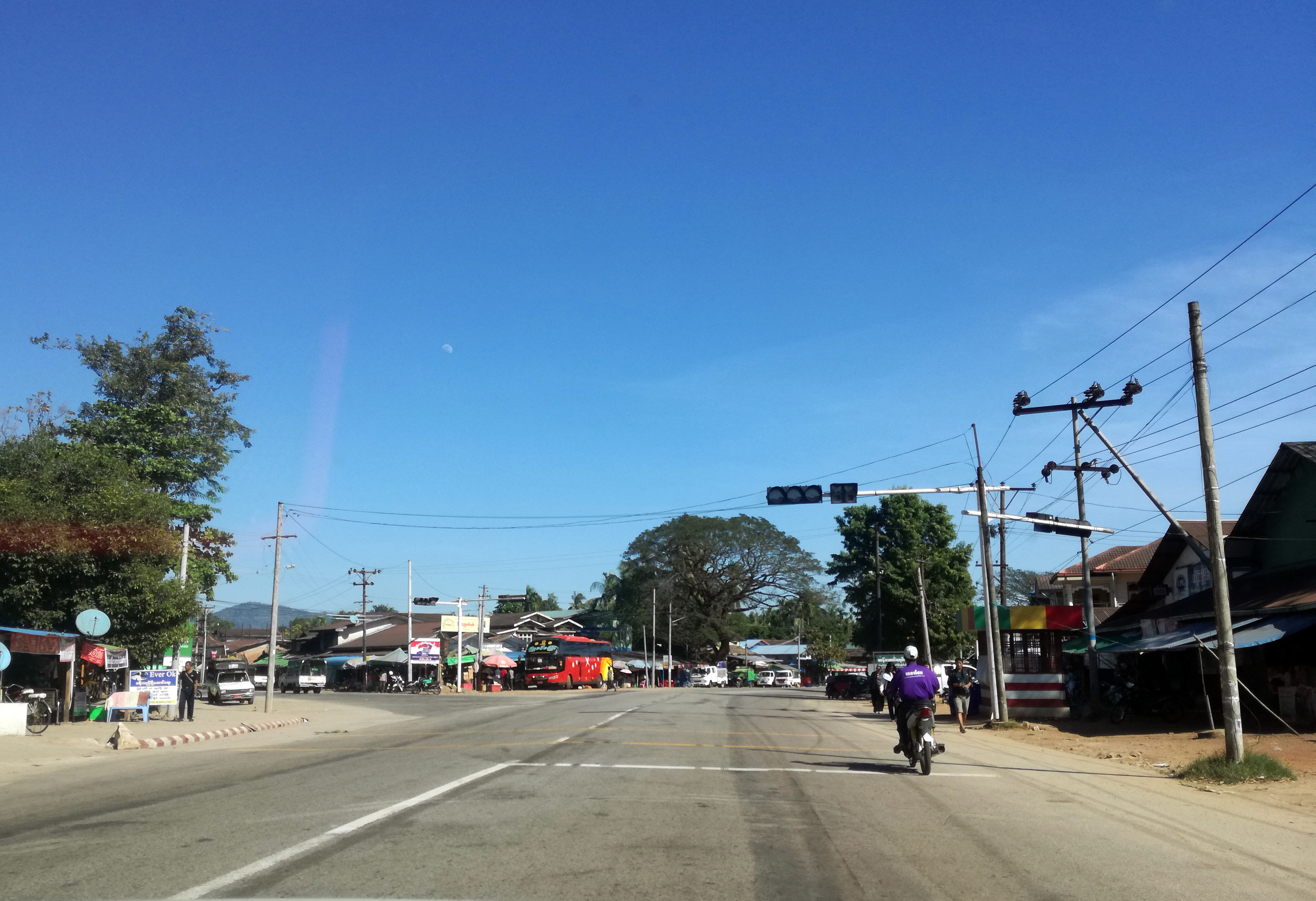

- Location in Burma
- Coordinates: 17°14′N 97°15′E
- Country: Myanmar
- State: Mon State
- District: Kyaikhto District
- Township: Bilin Township

Population (2005)
  - Religions: Buddhism
- Time zone: UTC+6.30 (MMT)

Bilin (Burmese: ဘီးလင်းမြို့; Mon: ဍုၚ်ၜဳကလေၚ်) is a town in the Mon State of south-east Myanmar. It is the seat of Bilin Township.

The Yangon-Mawlamyine Highway passes through Belin. The nearby Belin River flows into the Gulf of Martaban. The majority of residents are Bamar, and there are also members of the Kayin and Pa-O ethnic groups. The majority of people are Buddhists. Belin Township is home to the famous Kyaikhtisaung Pagoda located on a laterite stone hillock near Zoke Thoke village. The hillock itself was formed by laying laterite stones in squares of diminishing size on top of each other. The Malayalam novelist, U. A. Khader was born in Bilin in 1935.
