= Mount Zwegabin =

Mountain in Kayin State, Myanmar

Zwegabin (Burmese); Kwekabaw (S'gaw Karen); KweKaBaung (Phlon)
- ဇွဲကပင် တောင်; ကွဲၢ်ကဘီ; ခွဲါက္ၜင်
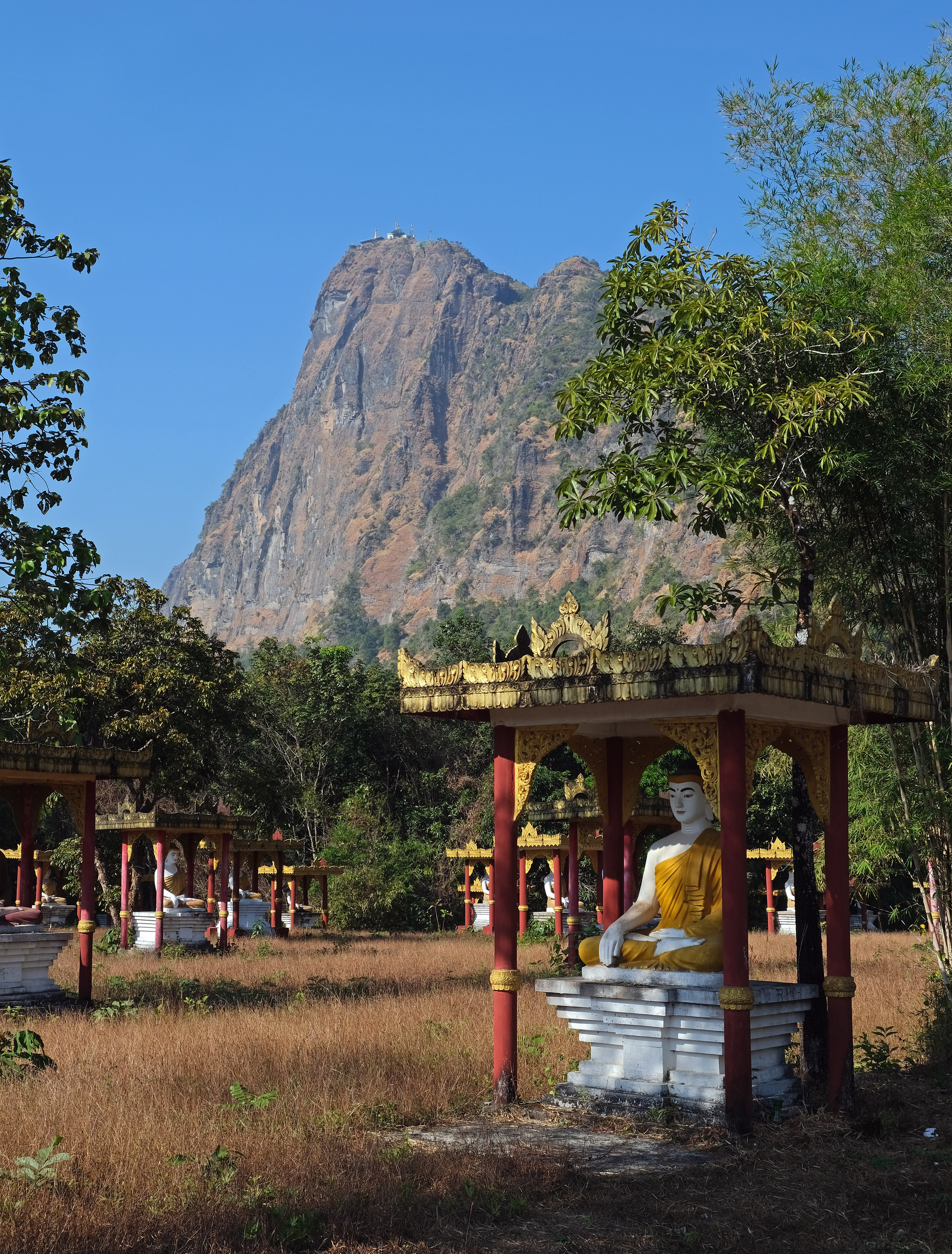
- The Buddha Statues Garden is located near the starting point of the stairs to the top of the mountain. Buildings at the top of the mountain belong to the Mount Zwegabin Monastery.

Highest point
- Elevation: 722 m (2,369 ft)
- Coordinates: 16°49′31″N 97°40′08″E

Geography
- Location within Myanmar
- Location: Kayin State, Myanmar
- Parent range: Tenasserim Hills

Mount Zwegabin (Burmese: ဇွဲကပင် တောင်; S'gaw Karen: ကွဲၢ်ကဘီကစၢၢ်; Phlone: ခွဲါက္ၜင်) is a mountain in Myanmar. It is located in Kayin State, in the southern part of the country, around 450 km south of the capital Naypyidaw. The mountain is about 722 meters (2,369 feet) above sea level, and the highest peak is said to reach 2,734 feet.

The terrain around Mount Zwegabin is flat to the northwest, but hilly to the southeast. Mount Zwegabin is the highest point in the region. The area surrounding the mountain is quite densely populated, with approximately 155 inhabitants per square kilometer. The closest major city is Hpa-an, located 8.2 kilometres (5.1 mi) northwest of Mount Zwegabin. The landscape around the mountains consists of a mosaic of agricultural land and natural vegetation.

== History ==
Mount Zwegabin is deeply rooted in Karen folklore. According to legend, a Karen brother and sister who suffered hardship under their stepfather were granted spiritual powers for their devotion and became guardians of the mountain.

== Geology ==
Mount Zwegabin is part of a local limestone-karst upland north of Hpa-an, in Kayin State. Geological studies refer to the “Zwekabin Range” as a series of isolated limestone hills, where the underlying rock includes the Paungnyo (Taungnyo) Formation (Carboniferous–Permian) overlain by Moulmein Limestone.

== Wildlife ==
The forests surrounding Mount Zwegabin are rich in biodiversity and home to several endemic species. Botanists have identified a new flowering plant, Globba zwegabinensis, named after the mountain where it was first discovered.

== Tourism ==
For centuries, Mount Zwegabin has been a major Buddhist pilgrimage site. Pilgrims climb to the summit pagoda, which is said to enshrine a sacred relic of the Buddha. The trail to the top, lined with hundreds of statues of meditating monks, offers one of the most scenic hikes in the region. Since Myanmar’s political opening in 2010, the mountain has become increasingly popular with both local and international tourists.

Community-based tourism projects now aim to preserve the environment while supporting local livelihoods. Many travelers also visit nearby Kyaiktiyo Pagoda (“Golden Rock”), often combining both sites as part of a wider pilgrimage route through Kayin and Mon States.

== Climate ==
The best time to visit Mount Zwegabin is from November to February, during the cool and dry season. Clear skies and comfortable temperatures make hiking more enjoyable. However, as this is also the busiest time for visitors, early morning climbs are recommended to avoid crowds and midday heat. The monsoon months from May to October can make the trails slippery, though the surrounding forest is at its greenest during this time.

== Development ==
Tourism-related development around Mount Zwegabin has grown in recent years. The Myanmar Native Land Public Company has announced plans to invest approximately $12–15 million to build bungalows, a shopping area, and visitor facilities following the completion of a cable car project.

== Religious significance ==
The Zwegabin Mountain Hair Relic Pagoda is believed to date back to the same era as other major Buddhist pilgrimage sites such as Kyaiktiyo Pagoda, Zin Kyaik Mountain Pagoda, and Mulae Pagoda. Every year, thousands of pilgrims visit during religious festivals to pay homage, meditate, and offer prayers.

== See also ==
- Saddan Cave
- List of mountains in Myanmar
