= Kyaikhtisaung Pagoda =

Notable Buddhist Pagoda in Mon, Myanmar

Kyaik Htee Saung Pagoda
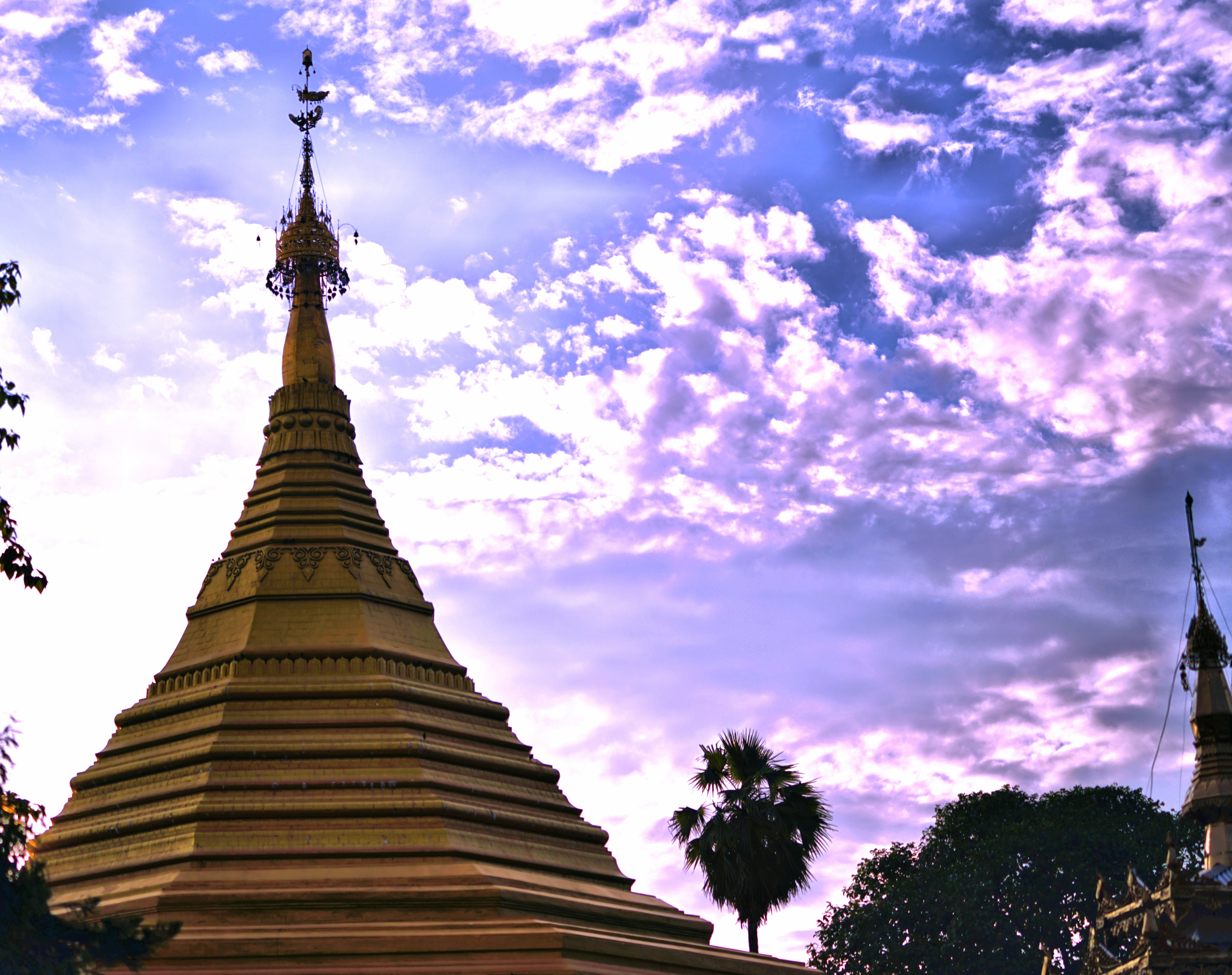
- Kyaik Htee Saung Pagoda

Religion
- Affiliation: Buddhism
- Sect: Theravada Buddhism
- Region: Mon State
- Status: Active

Location
- Country: Myanmar
- Interactive map of Kyaik Htee Saung Pagoda
- Coordinates: 17.160439°N 97.171523°E

Website
- kyaikhteesaung.org

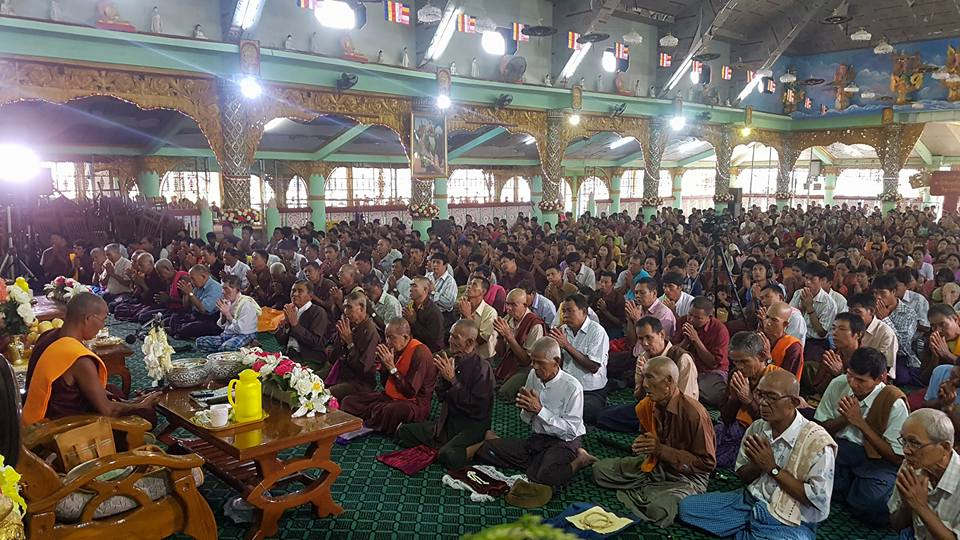
Dhamapali at Kyaikhtisaung

Kyai Khti Saung Pagoda (Burmese: ကျိုက်ထီးဆောင်းစေတီ) is a Buddhist pagoda in Bilin, Mon State, Myanmar.

== Geography ==
Kyaik Htee Saung Pagoda is located on a laterite stone hillock near the town of Bilin. The hillock itself is formed by the layering of laterite stones on top of one another, forming a large square that gradually tapers upward.

== History ==
According to tradition, in the Buddhist Era 111, Gautama Buddha arrived at Kaylartha Mountain, Thuwunna Bonmi and preached to hermits and monks and then gave them pieces of his hair.

Along with the hermits and monks, two belu brothers named Deiwa Kondala and Namani Kondala also received one piece of hair. In the Buddhist Era 113, the two brothers built a pagoda on a stone hill known as Mya Oo Taung and enclosed the hair in it. The pagoda was originally 63 cubits high and it was called Kyaik Kalookdek, meaning "A Pagoda Built by Devas" in the Mon language. The sacred hair of Buddha was put in a gold casket and enshrined in the pagoda. Daughters of the ogre brothers cut their hair to make ropes to put around the gold casket. So, the pagoda was called Kyaik Zoke Thoke, or "Hair-Rope Pagoda" in the Mon language. The village near the pagoda was also called Zoke Thoke Village. In the year 236 of the Buddhist Era, King Culasirimasoka of Thuwunna Bonmi under the guidance of Ashin Sona and Ashin Ottara, enshrined a tooth relic of the Buddha in the pagoda. Over time, the pagoda became derelict due to a lack of care. The umbrella of the pagoda started tilting. Because of this, the pagoda was called Kyaik Htisaung, which means "The Pagoda with Tilting Umbrella" in the Mon language.

== Restoration ==
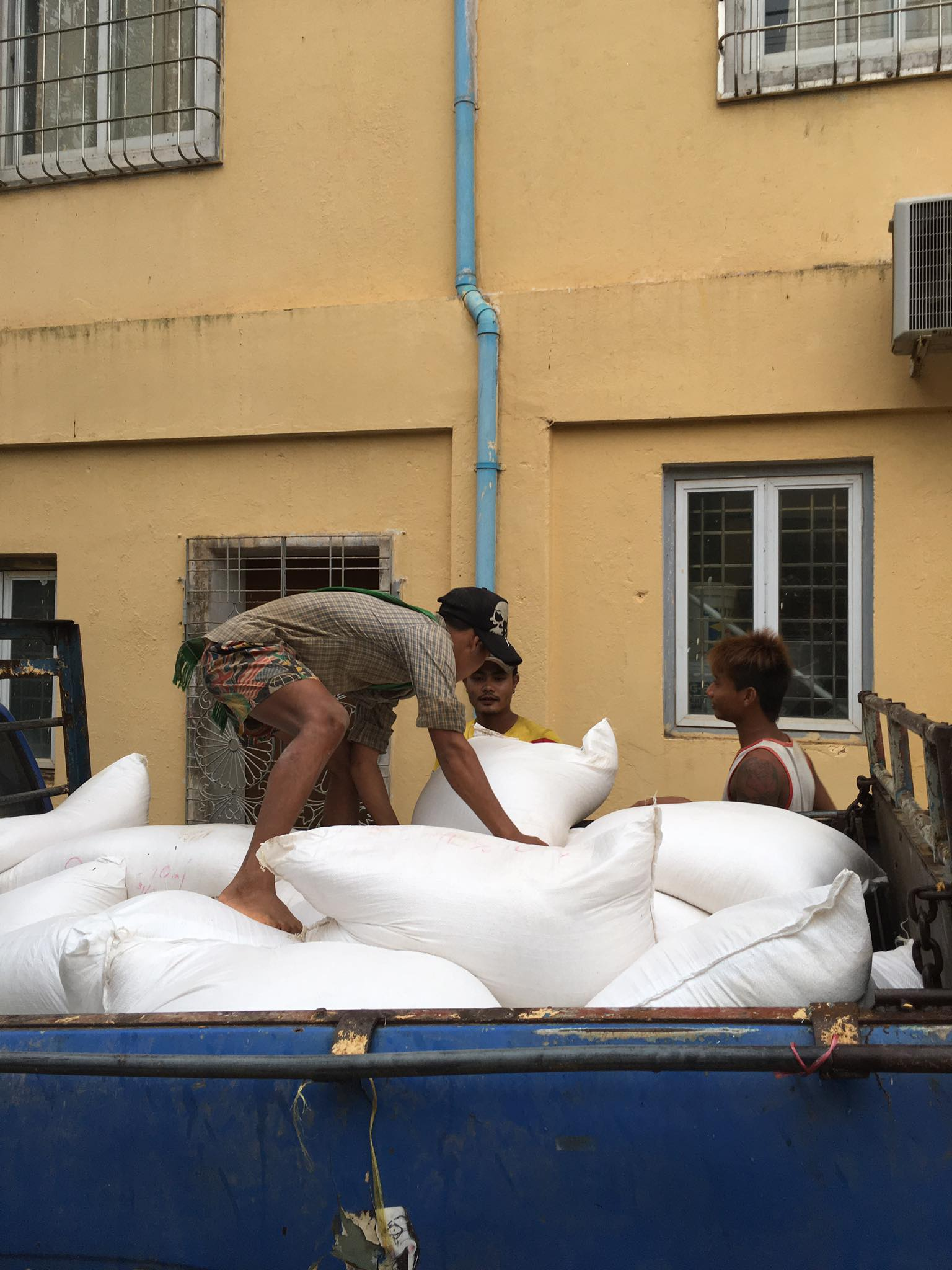
Volunteers at Kyaikhtisaung help to unload a donation of rice and oil made by a local patron, circa 2017

In 1971 the monk U Paññādipa, who later became the abbot of the monastery and well known as the Kyaikhtisaung Sayadaw, returned to his native village of Zoke Thoke. He found the old pagoda hidden under heavy growth. He then organized his disciples and local villagers to clear the area. Once the area was cleared, he rebuilt and renovated the old pagoda and old laterite hillock.

For the next forty years following the beginning of his restoration project, the Kyaikhtisaung Sayadaw rebuilt, re-enshrined and preserved a total of nine sacred pagodas, each with a hair relic of Gautama Buddha.

Currently, the Kyaikhtee Saung Golden Pagoda is a part of a large religious compound and monastery.

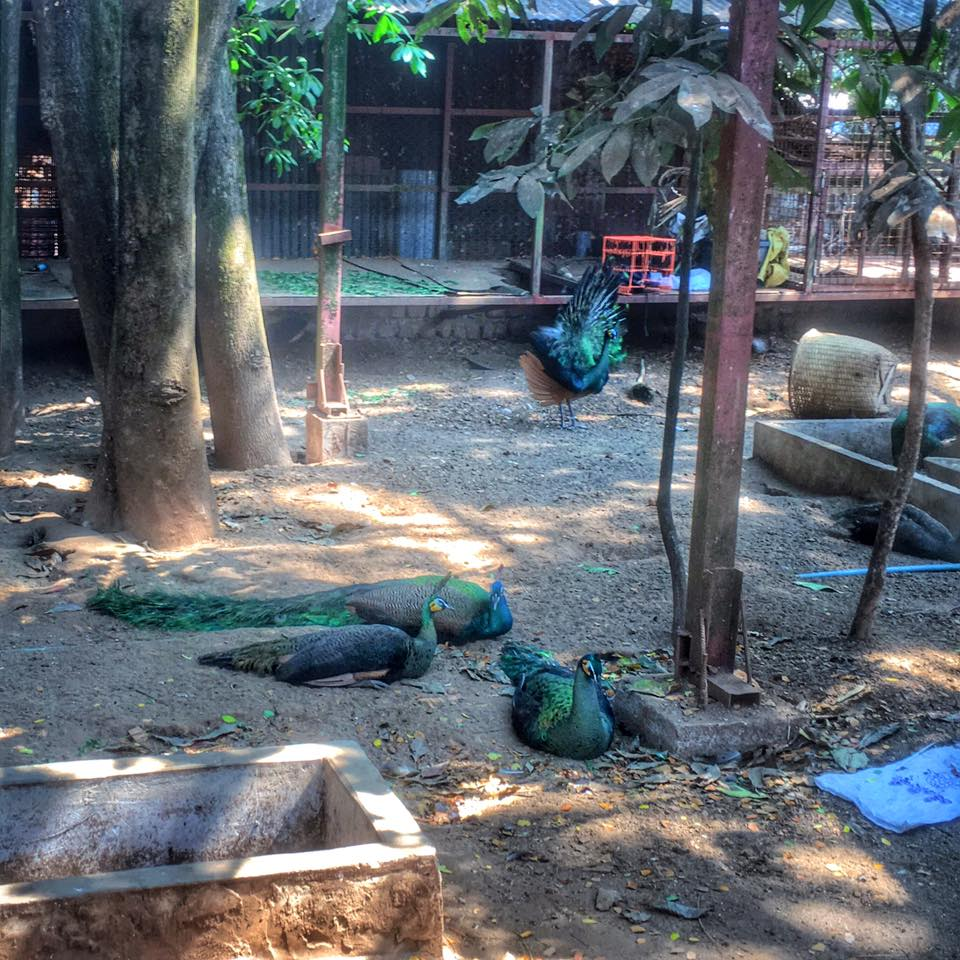
Peacocks at the Kyaikhtisaung compound, circa 2016. the first Sayardaw kept many animals at the compound, including monkeys, horses, bears, and fowl.

== Stone inscriptions of U Khanti of Mandalay Hills ==
Hermit U Khanti performed vast renovation projects throughout Myanmar during his lifetime, with a focus on remote hills and forest areas. One of his projects was to copy the Tripitakas donated by King Mindon onto marble slabs. On 3 March 2011, the Kyaikhtisaung Sayadaw had 135 of the stone inscriptions brought to the Kyaikhtisaung compound from Mandalay Hill.

== In the Media ==
In 2013, Myanmar Tycoon Khin Shwe worked together with the Kyaikhtisaung Sayadaw to try to raise the Dhammazedi Bell from the Yangon River. The bell had been commissioned by King Dhammazedi in 1484 as a donation to the Shwedagon Pagoda of Dagon (Yangon).

Upon his death, the Kyaik Htee Saung Sayadaw was succeeded by Sayadaw U Nargadipa.
