= Kyaiktiyo Pagoda =

Prominent Buddhist pilgrimage site in Myanmar

Kyaiktiyo Pagoda Golden Rock
- ဆံတော်ရှင်ကျိုက်ထီးရိုးစေတီတော်မြတ်
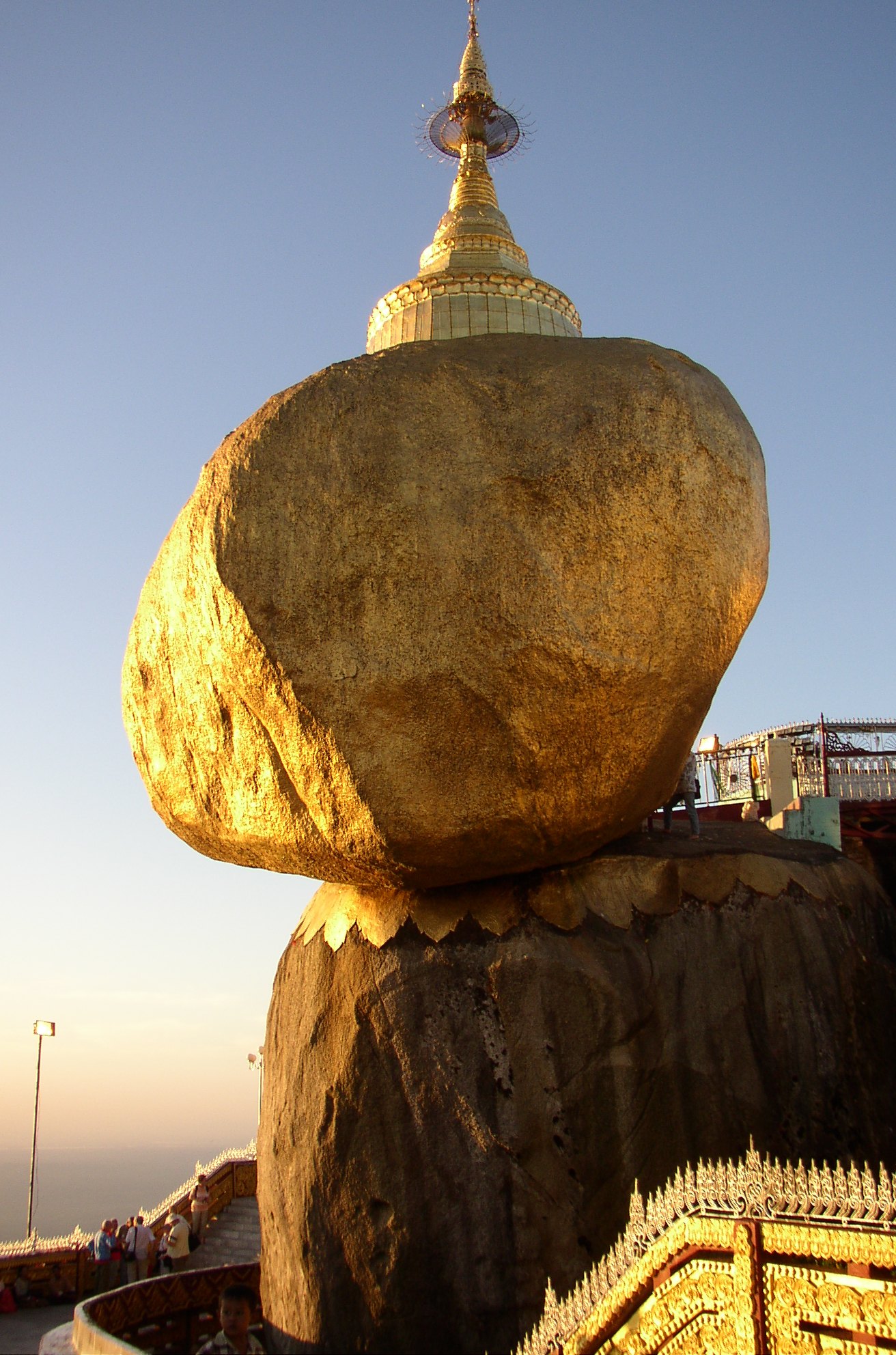
- Kyaiktiyo Pagoda over the Golden Rock

- Location within Myanmar

Religion
- Affiliation: Buddhism
- Sect: Theravada Buddhism
- Region: Mon State
- Status: active

Location
- Municipality: Kyaikto
- Country: Myanmar
- Coordinates: 17.481682°N 97.098118°E

Specifications
- Spire height: 15 m (49 ft)
- Elevation: 1,100 m (3,609 ft)

Kyaiktiyo Pagoda (Burmese: ကျိုက်ထီးရိုးဘုရား pronounced [tɕaɪʔtʰíjó pʰəjá] or ဆံတော်ရှင်ကျိုက်ထီးရိုးစေတီတော်မြတ်; Mon: ကျာ်သိယဵု [tɕaiʔ sɔeʔ jɜ̀]; also known as Golden Rock) is a well-known Buddhist pilgrimage site in Mon State, Myanmar. It is a small pagoda (7.3 m (24 ft)) built on the top of a granite boulder covered with gold leaves pasted on by its male worshippers.

According to legend, the Golden Rock itself is precariously perched on a strand of Gautama Buddha's hair. The balancing rock seems to defy gravity, as it perpetually appears to be on the verge of rolling down the hill. The rock and the pagoda are at the top of Mt. Kyaiktiyo. Another legend states that a Buddhist monk impressed the celestial king with his asceticism and the celestial king used his supernatural powers to carry the rock to its current place, specifically choosing the rock for its resemblance to the monk's head. It is the third most important Buddhist pilgrimage site in Burma after the Shwedagon Pagoda and the Mahamuni Pagoda.

== Etymology ==
In the Mon language, the word 'kyaik' (ကျာ်) means "pagoda" and 'yo' (ယဵု) means "to carry on the hermit's head". The word 'ithi' (ဣသိ in Mon (from Pali ရိသိ, risi) means "hermit". Thus, 'Kyaik-htiyo' means "pagoda upon a hermit's head".

== Legend ==
The legend associated with the pagoda is that on one of his many visits, Buddha gave a strand of his hair to Taik Tha, a hermit. The hermit, who had tucked it in the tuft of his hair safely, in turn gave the strand to the king, with the wish that the hair be enshrined in a boulder shaped like the hermit's head. The king had inherited supernatural powers from his father Zawgyi, a proficient alchemist), and his mother, a naga serpent dragon princess. They found the rock at the bottom of the sea. With the help of the Thagyamin, the king of Tawadeintha Heaven in Buddhist cosmology, they found the perfect place at Kyaiktiyo to locate the golden rock and built a pagoda, where the strand was enshrined. It is this strand of hair that, according to the legend, prevents the rock from tumbling down the hill. The boat, which was used to transport the rock, turned into a stone. This is also worshipped by pilgrims at a location about 300 metres (980 ft) from the golden rock. It is known as the Kyaukthanban Pagoda or stupa (literal meaning: stone boat stupa).

Legend also mentions that pilgrims undertaking the pilgrimage by trekking from the Kinpun base camp three times consecutively in a year will be blessed with wealth and recognition.

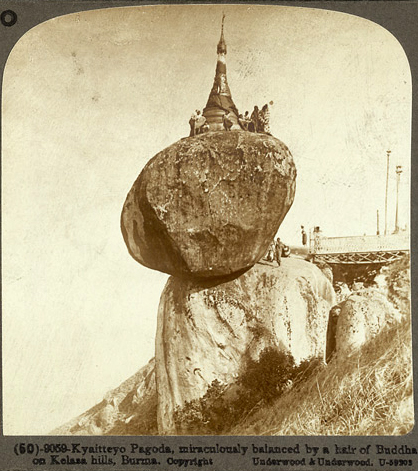
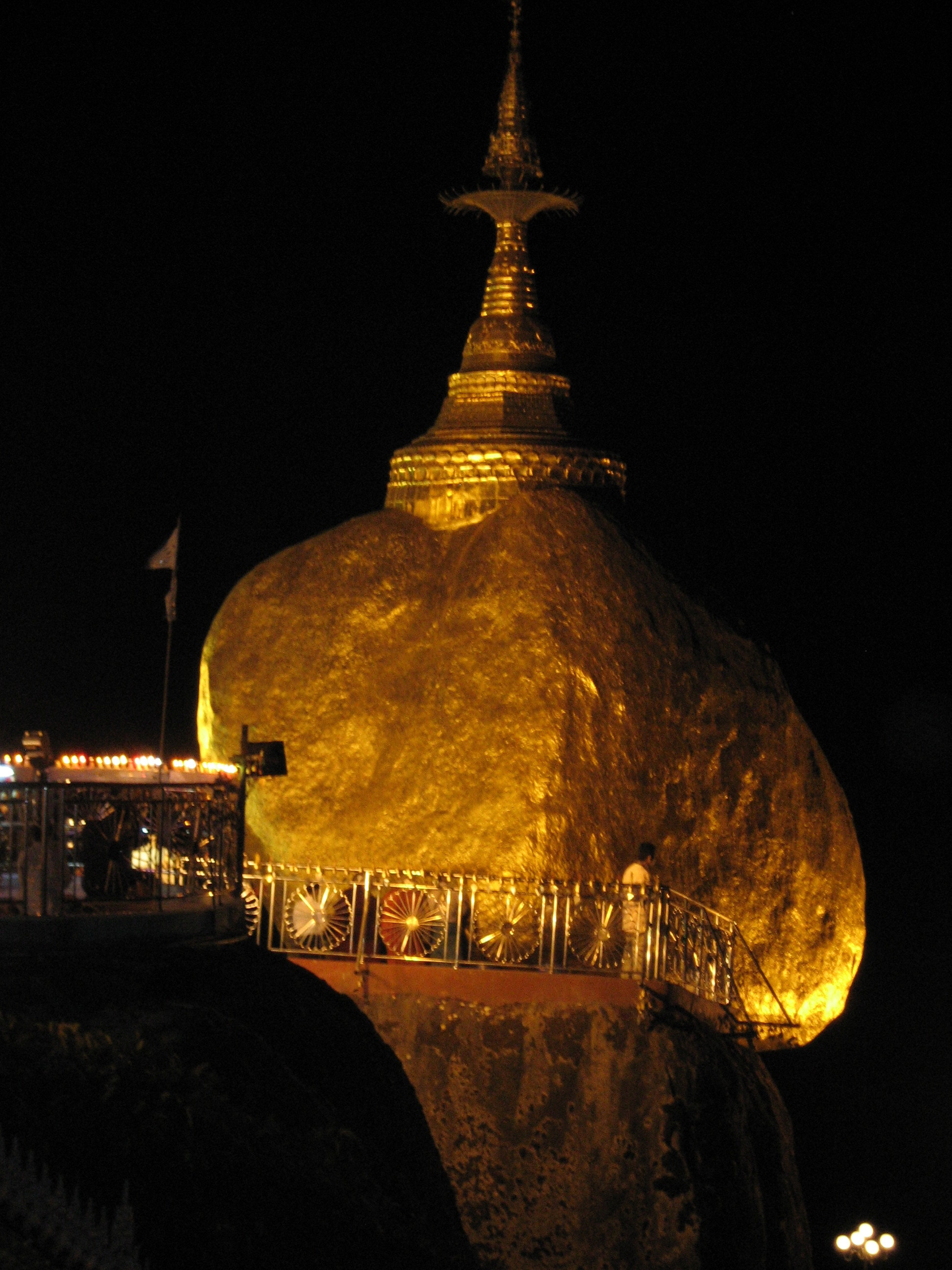
Left: Stereoscopic view in 1900. Right: Night view in 2007

== Geography ==
The pagoda is located near Kyaikto in Mon State in the northern part of the Tenasserim coast. The Golden Rock is situated at an elevation of 1,100 m (3,609 ft) above mean sea level, on top of the Kyaiktiyo hill (also known as Kelasa hills or Eastern Yoma mountains); it is on the Paung-laung ridge of the Eastern Yoma mountains. It is at a distance of 210 kilometres (130 mi) from Yangon and 140 kilometres (87 mi) north of Mawlamyine, the capital of Mon State. The Kinpun village 16 kilometres (9.9 mi) is at the base of Mt. Kyaiktiyo. It is the closest to the Kyaiktiyo Pagoda. From Kyaiktiyo, the foot trail or road starts for the Golden rock. On this approach, there are numerous granite boulders on the mountain, perched in precarious condition. Near the top of the mountain, there are two large lions guarding the entrance to Kyaiktiyo Pagoda. From this location, known as Yatetaung (the last point for vehicular traffic), pilgrims and visitors have to climb to the Golden Rock barefoot, after leaving their footwear behind, as per Burmese custom. The paved mountain track, built in 1999, from the bus terminal at Yatetaung, is along a dusty section with kiosks on both sides and the climb of 1.2 kilometres (0.75 mi) up to the Golden Rock is stiff and takes about one hour to reach. From the base camp at Kinpun, the hiking trek to the pagoda is about 11 kilometres (6.8 mi) and many devotees do this trek as part of the pilgrimage rites. There are also many temples and pagodas, which have been built recently on other hills in the vicinity of the Kyaiktiyo Pagoda that are visited by pilgrims and tourists by trekking along foot tracks.

== Structures ==
The boulder, which gleams golden and is popularly known as the Golden Rock, and on which the small Kyaiktiyo Pagoda has been built, is about 25 feet (7.6 m) in height and has a circumference of 50 feet (15 m). The Pagoda above the rock is about 7.3 metres (24 ft) in height. The boulder sits on a natural rock platform that appears to have been naturally formed to act as the base to build the pagoda. This granite boulder lies on an inclined plane and the area of contact is extremely small. The golden rock or boulder and the rock table on which it is resting are independent of each other; the golden rock has an overhang of half its length and is perched at the extreme end of the sloping surface of the rock. There is a sheer vertical drop in the rock face, into the valley below. A lotus shape is painted in gold leaf, encircling the base of the rock. It appears as though the boulder will crash down at any moment. A staircase leads to the pagoda complex that houses several viewing platforms, pagodas and shrines for nats (folk deities worshipped in Burma in conjunction with Buddhist shrines). However, the Golden Rock is the main attraction for the pilgrims who offer prayers and also stick golden leaves on the rock in reverence. A short distance away, there is a circle of gongs with four statues of nats and angels in the centre.

A main square close to the golden rock has many establishments that deal in religious paraphernalia for worship and offerings made by the pilgrims. Adjoining the plaza area are restaurants, gift shops, and guest houses. A new terrace has been built at a lower level from which visitors can get a good view of the rock and the pagoda.

== Pilgrimage ==
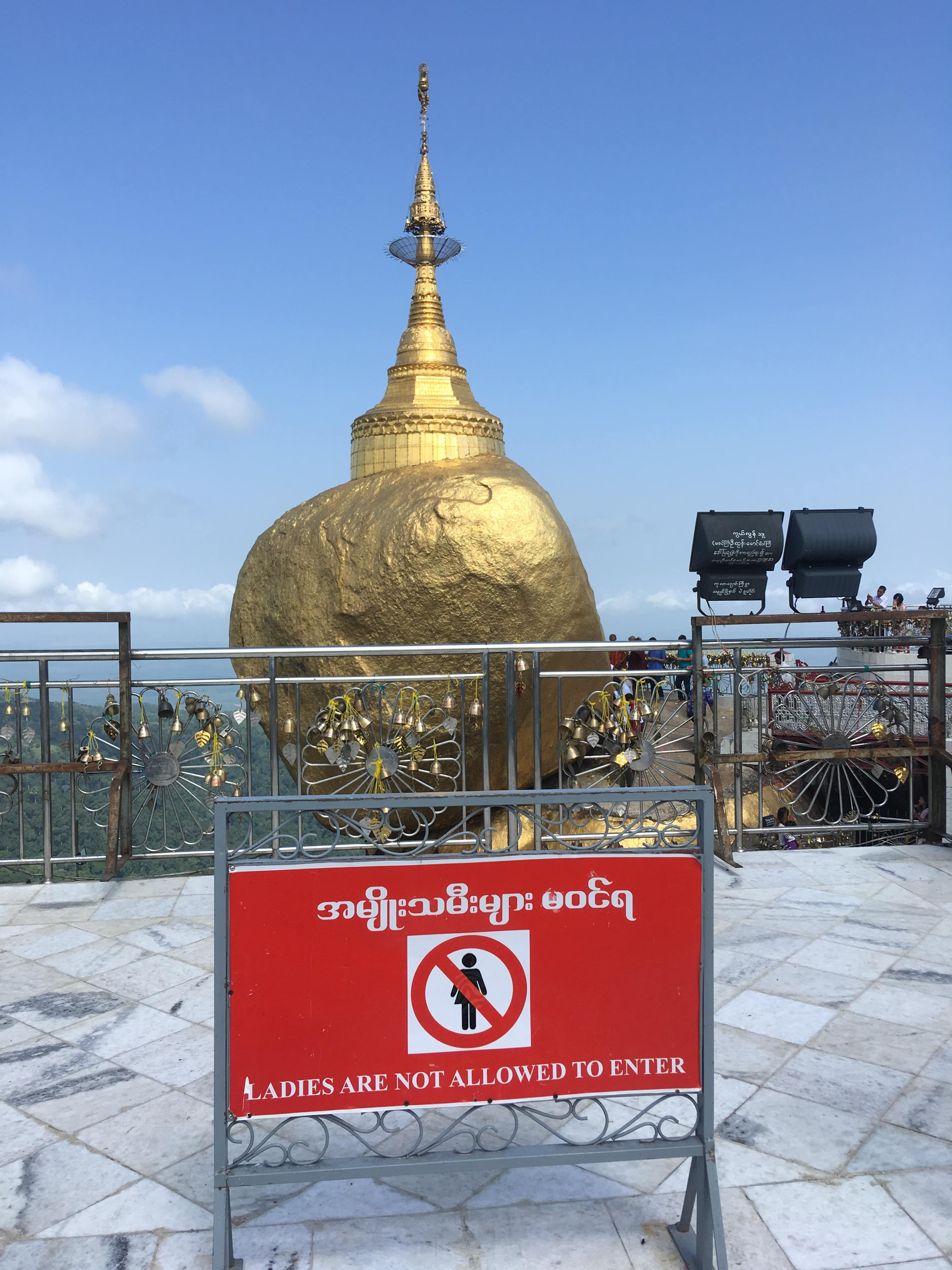
A no women allowed sign near Kyaiktiyo Pagoda

Kyaiktiyo Pagoda or Golden Rock has become a popular pilgrimage and also tourist attraction. At the peak of the pilgrimage season, during November to March, an atmosphere of devotion is witnessed at Kyaikhtiyo pagoda. As the golden rock gleams in different shades from dawn to dusk (the sight at dawn and at sunset are unique), pilgrims' chants reverberate in the precincts of the shrine. Lighting of candles, meditation and offerings to the Buddha continues throughout the night. Men cross over a bridge across an abyss to affix golden leaves (square in shape) on the face of the Golden Rock, in deep veneration. However, women are not allowed to touch the rock so cannot cross the bridge. Pilgrims visit the pagoda, from all regions of Myanmar; a few foreign tourists also visit the pagoda. Even disabled persons who are staunch devotees of Buddha visit the pagoda, walking up the track on crutches. Some elderly people who cannot climb up themselves are carried on stretchers by porters to the Pagoda to offer prayers to Buddha. The Full Moon day of Tabaung in March, is a special occasion for pilgrims who visit the shrine. On this day, the platform of the pagoda is lighted with ninety thousand candles as reverential offering to the Buddha. The devotees visiting the pagoda also offer fruits, food and incense to the Buddha.

== Gallery ==
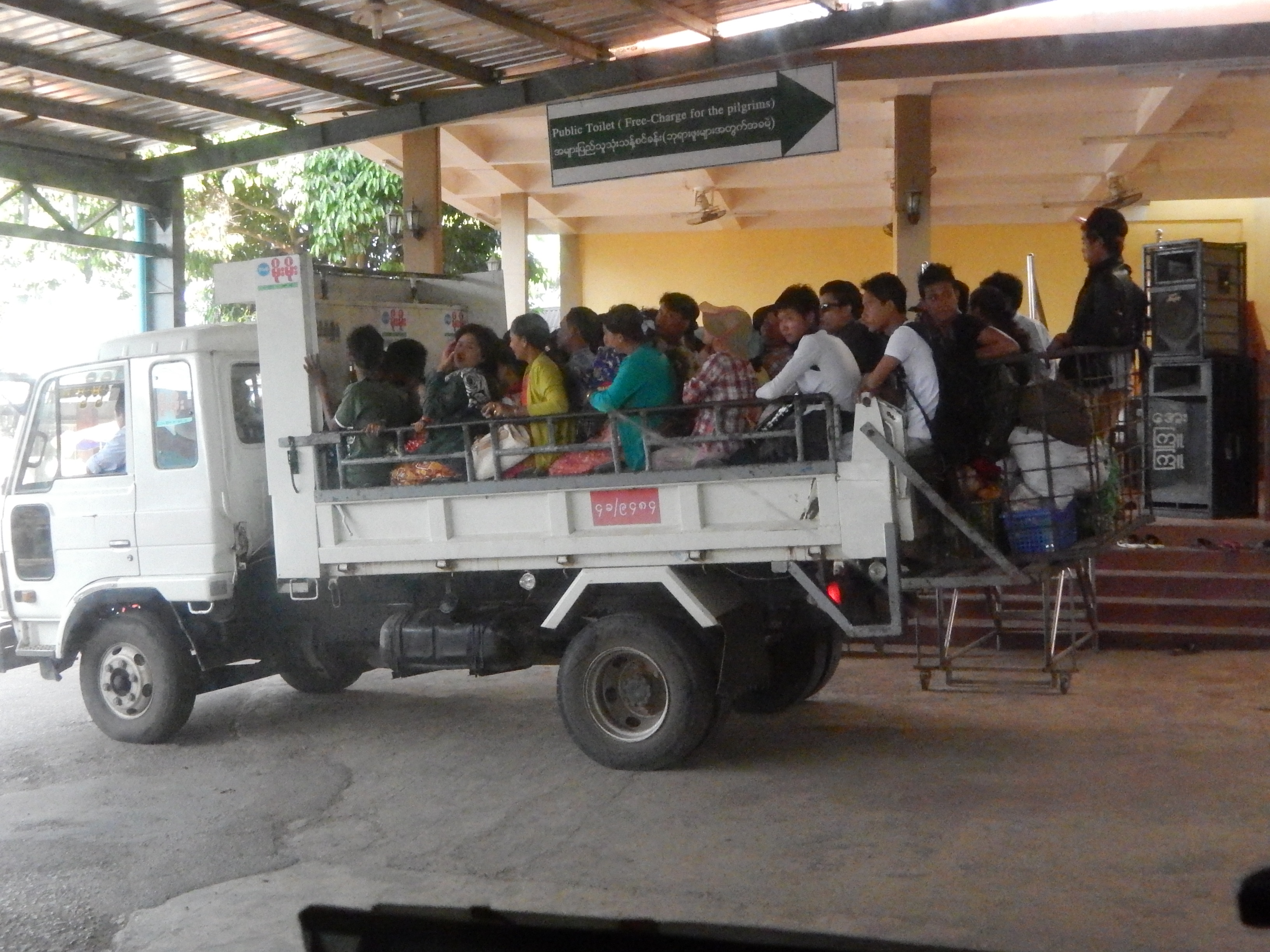
Bus at Kyaikhtiyo base station

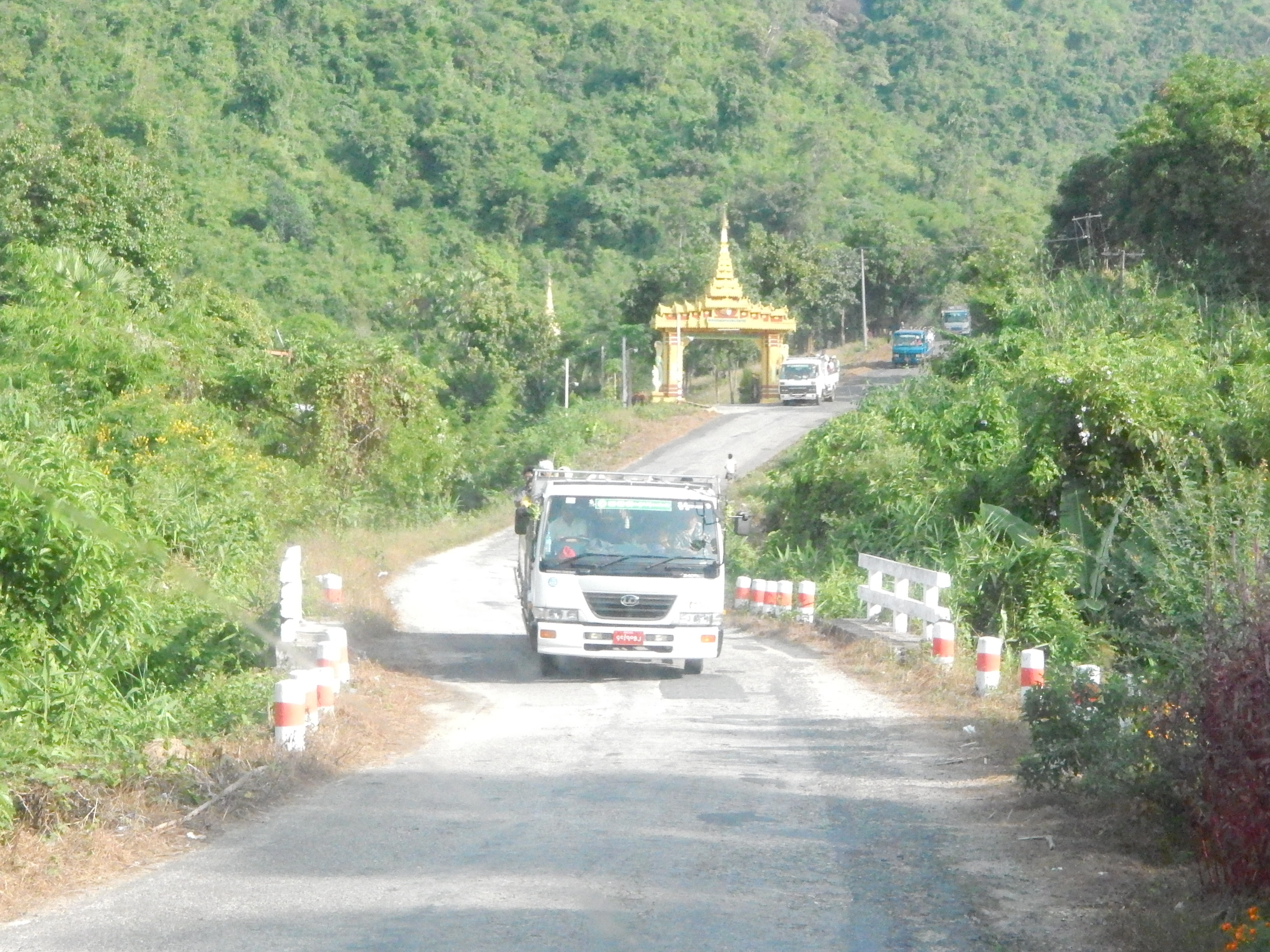
Road to the hill

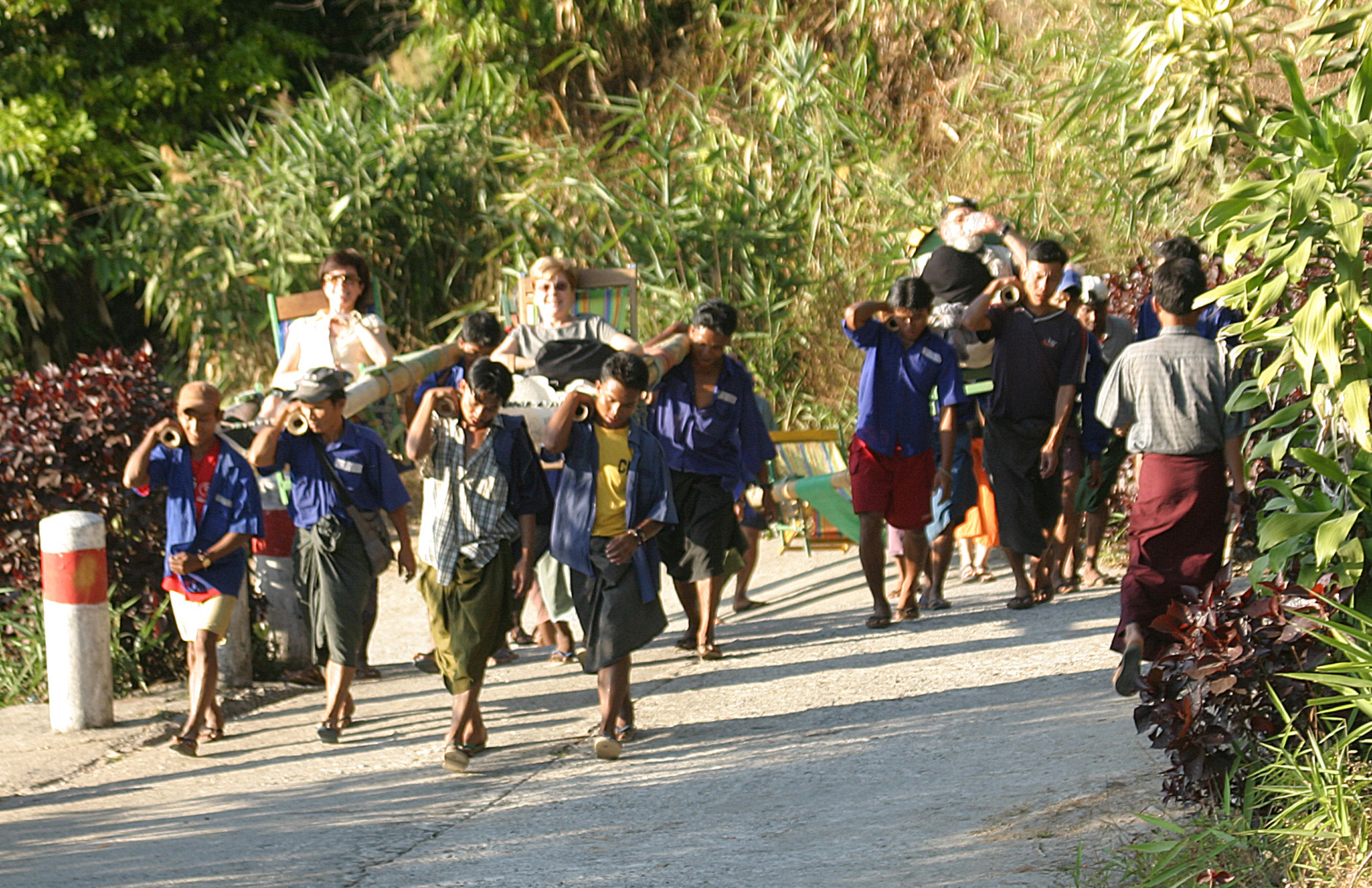
Litters for tourists

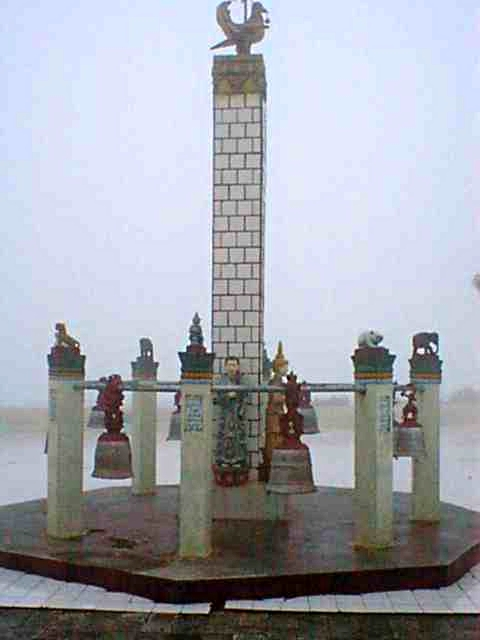
Tagundaing in the plaza area at Kyaiktiyo

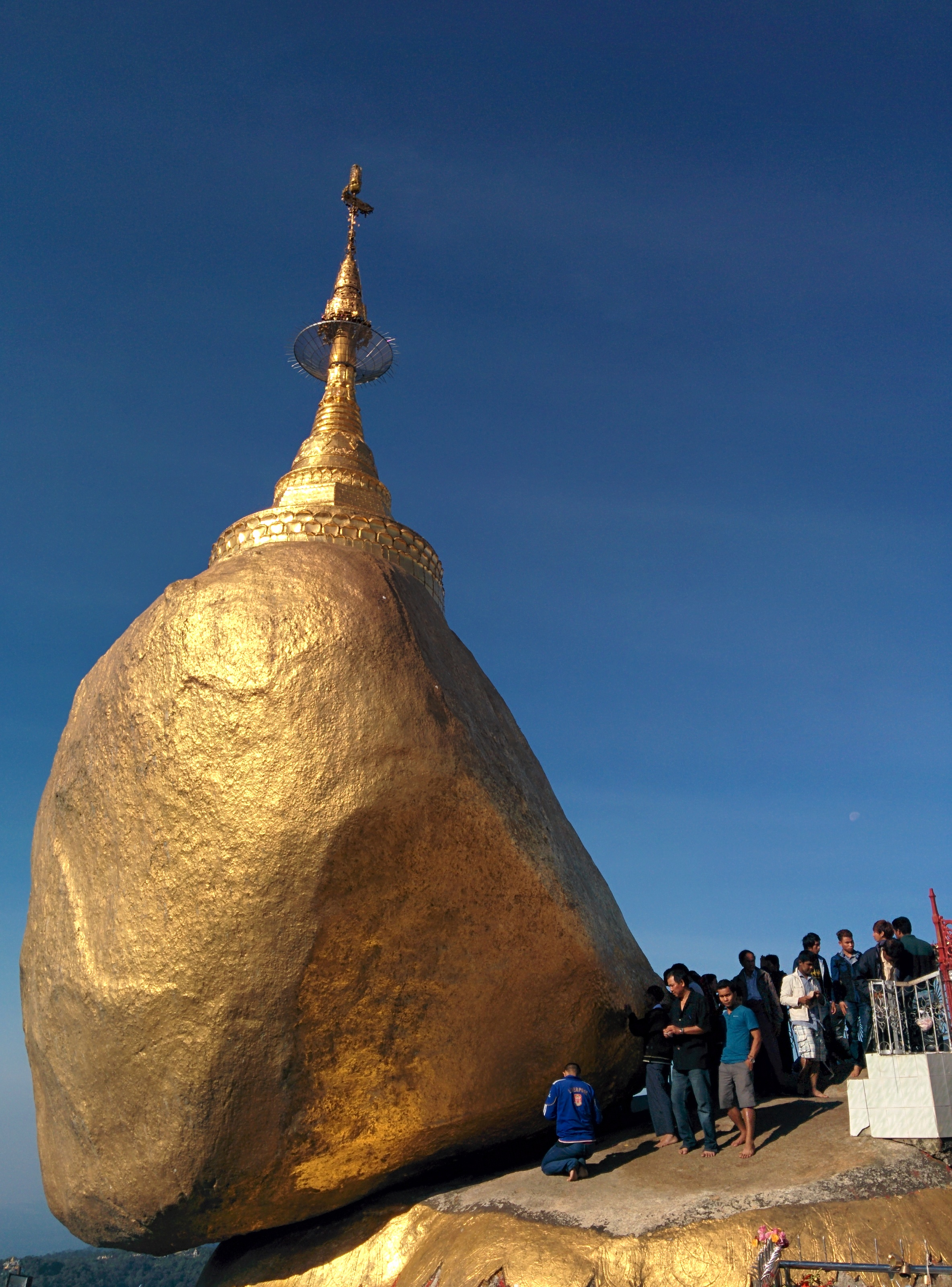
Upāsaka adding gold leaf to the rock

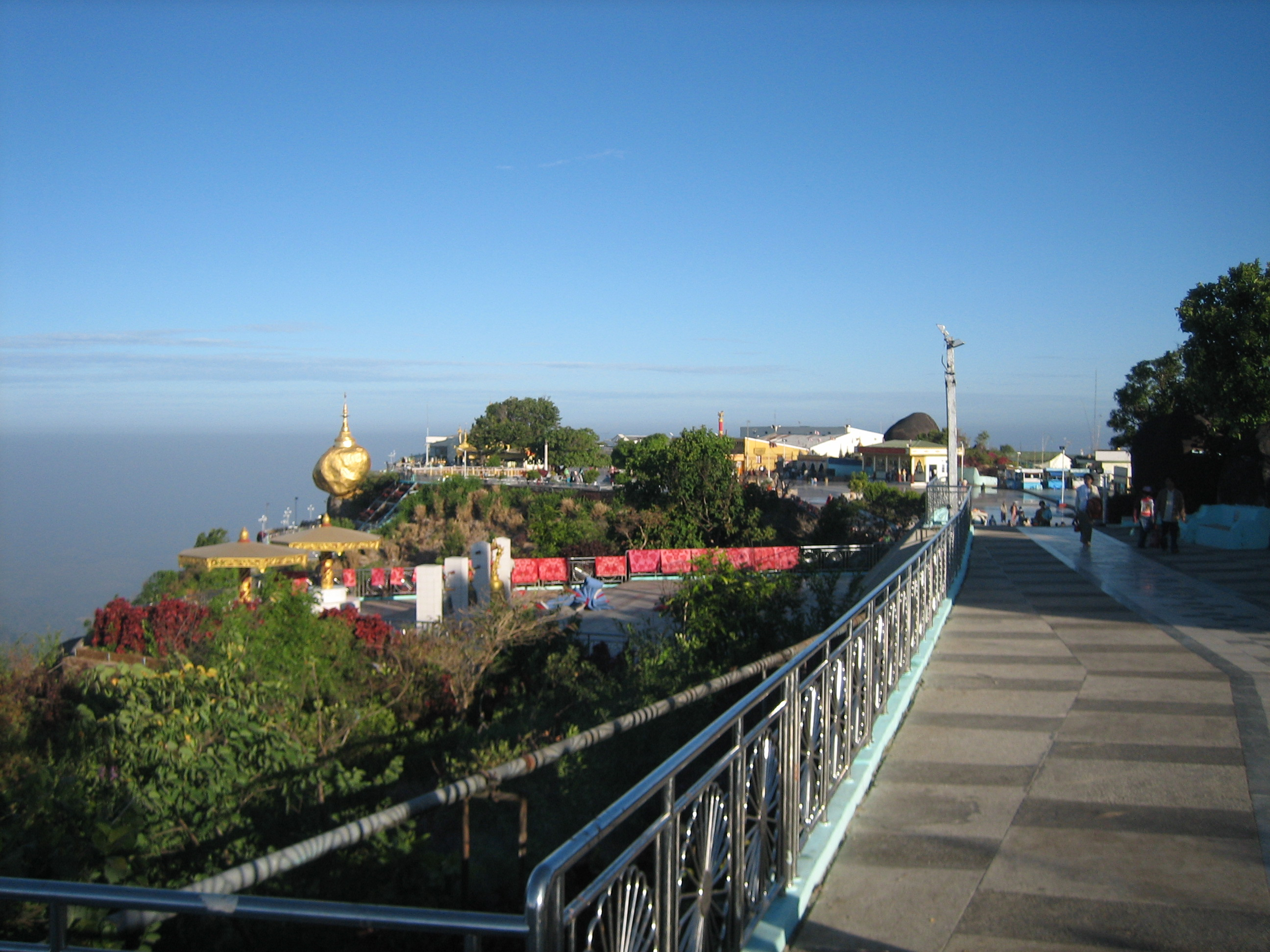
Golden rock and Kyaiktiyo Pagoda precincts in the morning

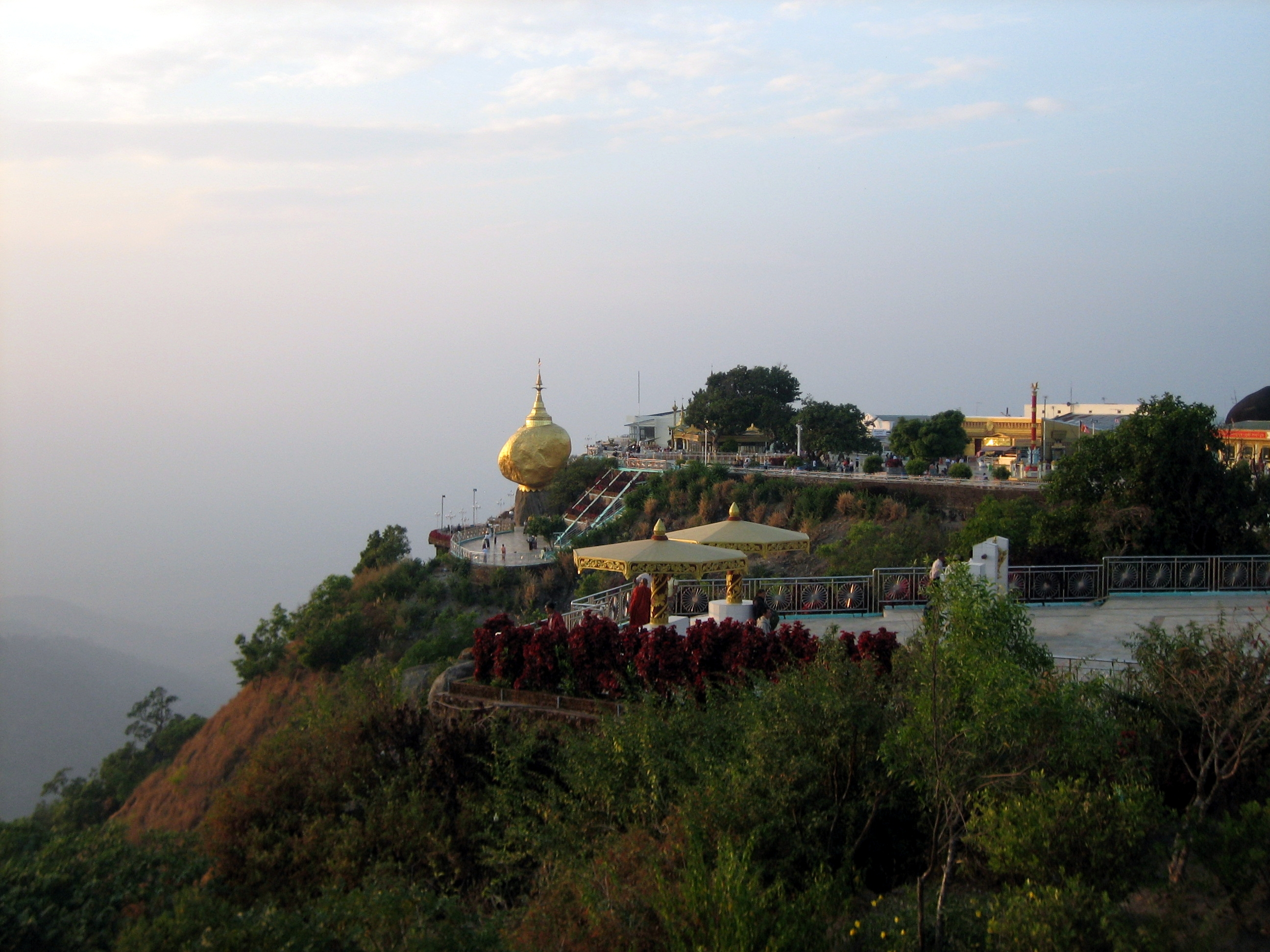
View of Kyaiktiyo at Sunset

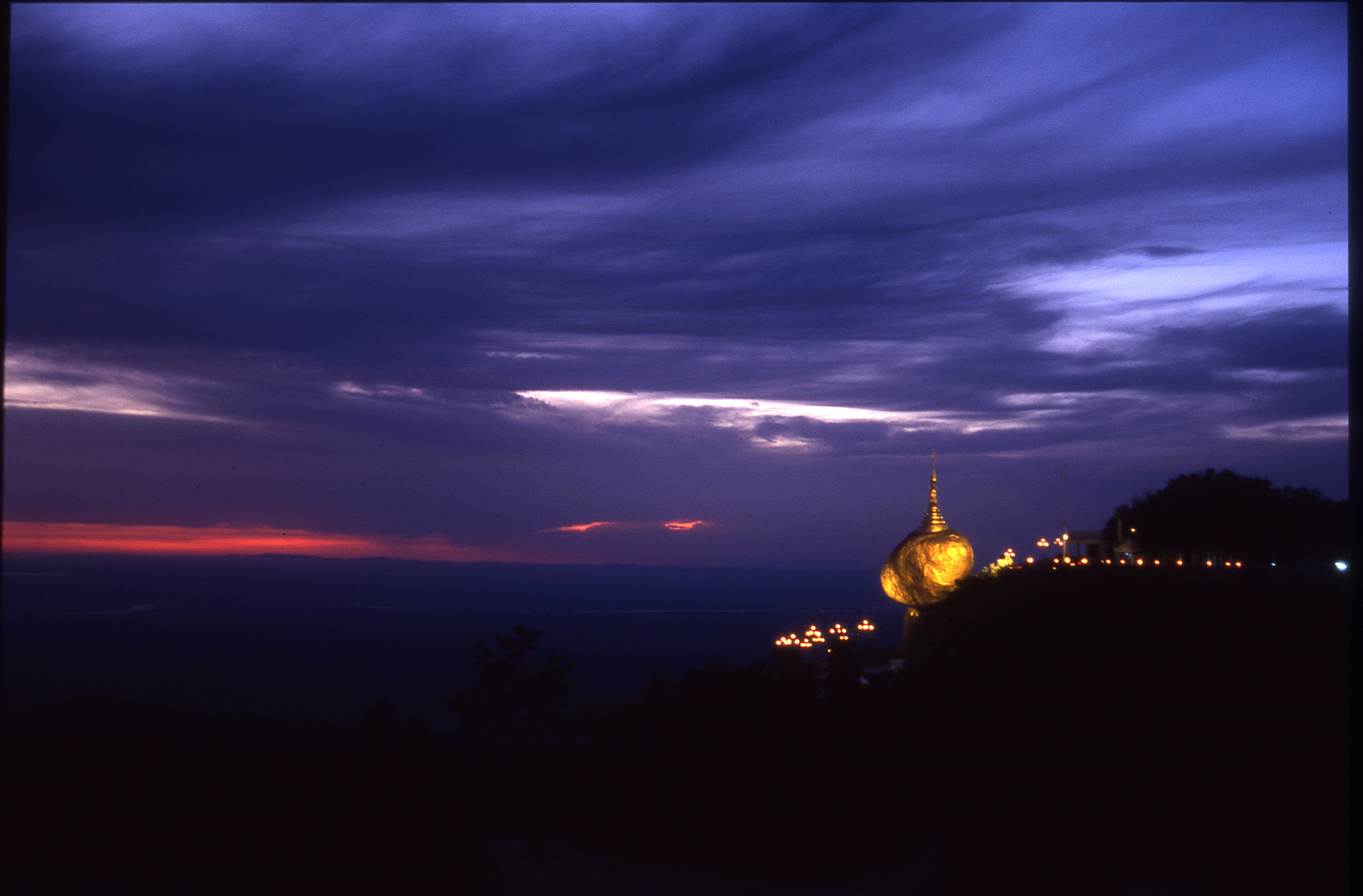
Night view of Golden Rock and the Pagoda

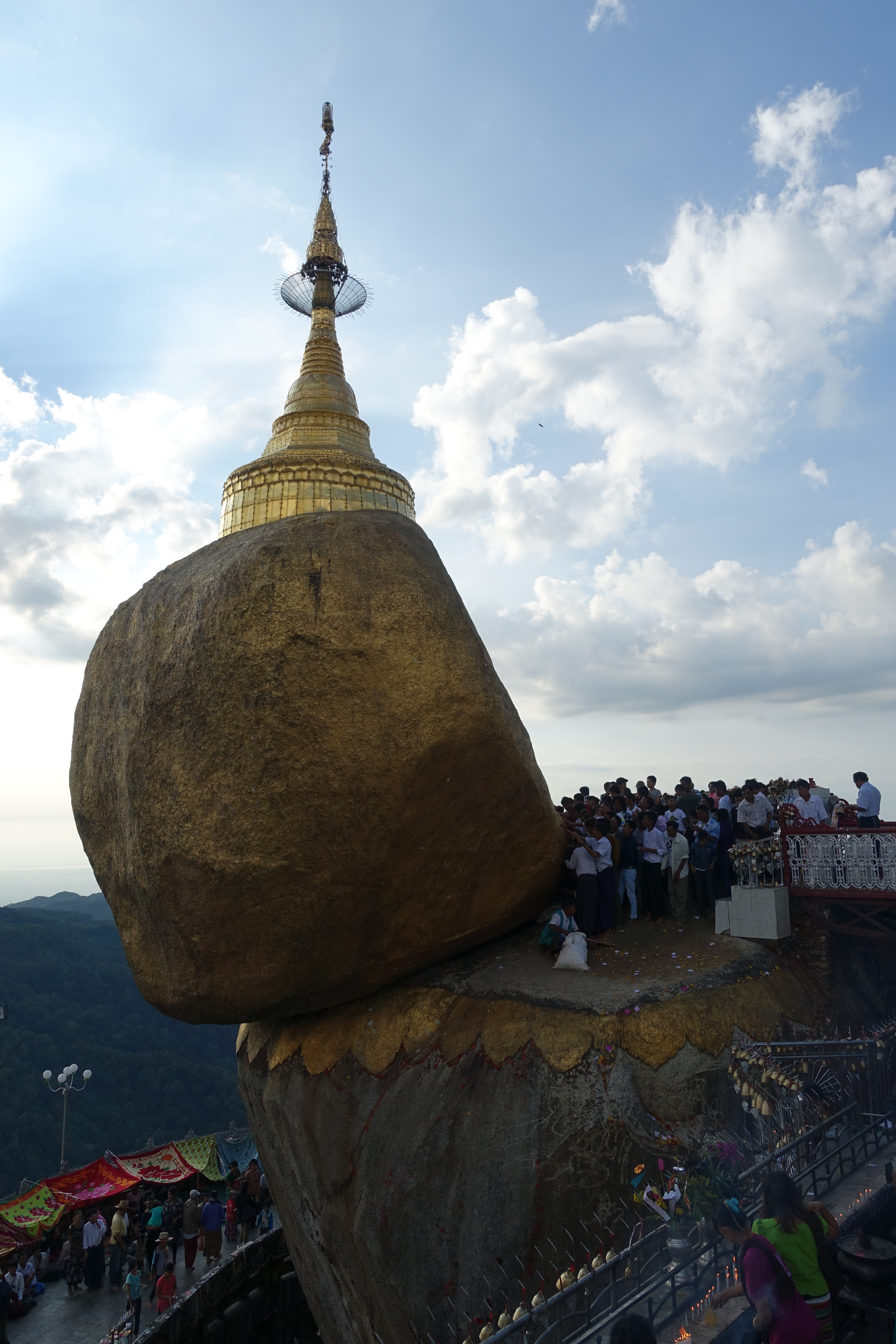
Male Buddhists are allowed to paste gold leaf onto the rock, as a sign of devotion

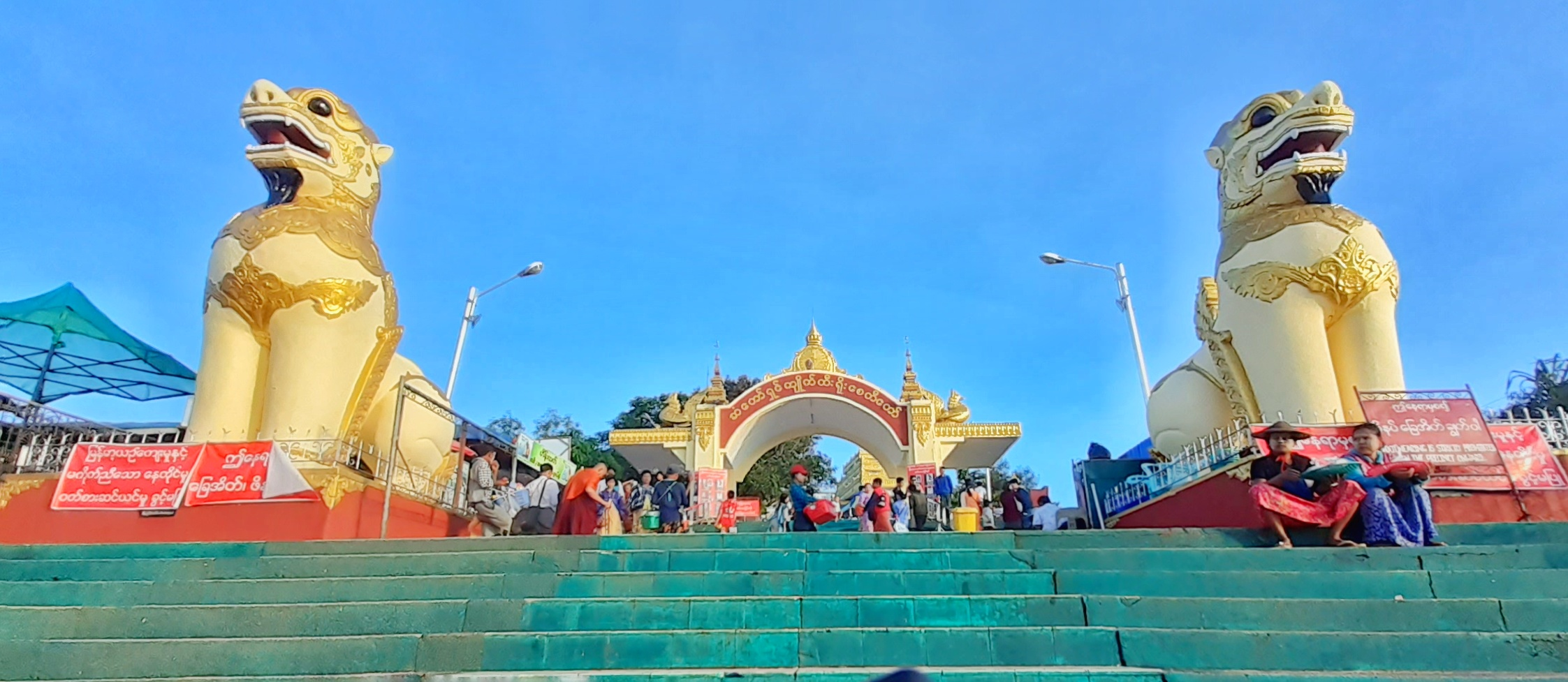
The Gate of KyaiktiYoe Pagoda (ဆံ‌ေတာ်ရှင်ကျိုက်ထီးရိုးစေတီ‌ေတာ်၏မုခ်ဝ)
