= Khin Zaw Oo =

Burmese politician

Member of the Amyotha Hluttaw
- Incumbent
- Assumed office 3 February 2016
- Constituency: Mon State № 3
- Majority: 21942 votes

Personal details
- Born: 27 June 1966 (age 60) Kyaikmaraw, Myanmar
- Party: National League for Democracy
- Spouse: Kyu Kyu Wai
- Children: Poe Zarchi Ei Ei Zaw; Thura Phyo Zaw
- Parent(s): San Thein (father); Nyunt Yi (mother)
- Education: Mawlamyaing University

Khin Zaw Oo (Burmese: ခင်ဇော်ဦး, born 27 June 1966) is a Burmese politician who currently serves as an Amyotha Hluttaw MP for Mon State No. 3 constituency. He is a member of the National League for Democracy.

== Early life and education ==
Khin Zaw Oo was born on 27 June 1966 in Kyaikmaraw, Mon State, Myanmar. He graduated with a B.Sc. from Mawlamyaing University.

== Political career ==
He is a member of the National League for Democracy Party, and was elected as an Amyotha Hluttaw MP, winning a majority of 21942 votes and elected representative from Mon State No. 3 parliamentary constituency.
