= Kokunye Kyun =

- Island
- Location within Myanmar
- Coordinates: 15°18′0″N 97°42′35″E
- Country: Myanmar
- State: Mon

Area
  - Total: 0.7 km^{2} (0.27 sq mi)
- Elevation: 140 m (460 ft)
- Time zone: UTC+6:30 (Myanmar Standard Time)

Kokunye Kyun is an island in the Andaman Sea, right off the coast of Mon State, in the southern area of Burma. It is located in an area of shoals. This island is 1.4 kilometres (0.87 mi) long and its maximum width is 0.4 kilometres (0.25 mi). It is covered with dense forest and rises to a height of 140 metres (460 ft).

== Geography ==
Kokunye Kyun is the northernmost of a chain of small coastal islands that lie close to the mouth of the Ye River. It is located 10 kilometres (6.2 mi) to the north of Wa Kyun, the next island along the coast to the south.

== See also ==
- List of islands of Burma
