= Kyungyi Island =

Kyungyi ကျွန်းကြီး
- Island
- Location within Myanmar
- Coordinates: 15°4′30″N 97°44′15″E
- Country: Myanmar
- State: Mon

Area
  - Total: 3 km^{2} (1.2 sq mi)
- Elevation: 163 m (535 ft)
- Time zone: UTC+6:30 (Myanmar Standard Time)

Kyungyi Island (Burmese: ကျွန်းကြီး) is an island in the Andaman Sea, right off the coast of Mon State, in the southern area of Burma.

== Geography ==
This 4.6 kilometres (2.9 mi) long island is located 4.3 kilometres (2.7 mi) from the shore. It has four conspicuous peaks covered with dense forest that rise to a maximum height of 163 metres (535 ft).

Kyungyi lies 8 kilometres (5.0 mi) south of Nat Kyun and is the southernmost of a chain of small coastal islands that lie off the mouth of the Ye River.

== See also ==
- List of islands of Burma
