= Gwa Kyun =

- Island
- Location within Myanmar
- Coordinates: 17°34′21″N 94°31′00″E
- Country: Myanmar
- State: Rakhine

Area
  - Total: 0.3 km^{2} (0.12 sq mi)
- Elevation: 44 m (144 ft)
- Time zone: UTC+6:30 (Myanmar Standard Time)

Gwa Kyun, also known as Gwa Chaung, is a small island off the coast of Rakhine State, Burma.

== Geography ==
Gwa Kyun is 1 kilometre (0.62 mi) long and 0.4 kilometres (0.25 mi) wide in its widest point. The island is wooded, rising to a height of 44 m. Its western coast is rocky, while its eastern shore is a white sandy beach. Gwa Kyun is located 2.4 kilometres (1.5 mi) to the west of the nearest point in the mainland coast.

== See also ==
- List of islands of Burma
