= Pontamau =

- Island
- Location within Myanmar
- Coordinates: 17°18′59″N 94°30′4″E
- Country: Myanmar
- Region: Ayeyarwady

Area
  - Total: 0.2 km^{2} (0.077 sq mi)
- Elevation: 54 m (177 ft)
- Time zone: UTC+6:30 (Myanmar Standard Time)

Pontamau is a small island off the coast of Ayeyarwady Region, Burma.

== Geography ==
Pontamau is 0.6 kilometres long and 0.3 km wide. It is separated from the mainland coast by a 0.75 km wide sound.

The island is wooded and rises to a height of 54 m. It is fringed with reefs and lies about 5 km west of Bomie Bay.

=== Nearby islands ===
Myauk island is a small islet 0.8 km to the northeast of Pontamau's north-eastern-most point.

== See also ==
- List of islands of Burma
