= Hla Tun (politician) =

His Excellency U Hla Tun
- လှထွန်း

Minister for Electricity, Energy and Industry of Mon State Government
- Incumbent
- Assumed office 7 May 2019
- Preceded by: Min Htin Aung Han

Personal details
- Born: 19 February 1958 (age 68) Yangon
- Party: National League for Democracy
- Spouse: Soe Soe Lwin
- Children: Nay Soe Tun, Kaung Sett, Moh Moh Ei San
- Education: BE (Electrical Power) RIT
- Occupation: Economic, Financial, Politician
- Profession: Engineering Management
- Known for: Observer of Finance, Business and Political

Hla Tun (Burmese: လှထွန်း) is a Burmese politician who is currently serving as Minister for Electricity, Energy and Industry of Mon State Government.

== Career ==
=== Chief Engineer ===
Hla Tun was born on 19 February 1958, and he appointed assistant engineer for Ministry of Energy in 1991. he was promoted to assistant executive engineer and then executive engineer for Lawpita Hydropower Station and Pyinmana Township Electrical Engineer in 1991–2000. He served for Kalaw Substation, Inngone Substation and Pyinmana Substation for 2000–2009. He then served Shan (East) State as an Electrical Engineer, Naypyitaw District Electrical Engineer, Superintendent Engineer and Assistant Chief Engineer for Yangon Electricity Supply Board in 2009–2014. He was then promoted to deputy chief engineer for Mandalay Region Electrical Engineer, Naypyitaw Head office and Bago Region Electrical Engineer since 2014–2018. He has retired in 2018. He appointed Mon State Government (Minister of Electricity, Energy and Industry) on 7 May 2019. He is still serving for Mon State Government.
