= Myingyi Kyun =

- Island
- Location within Myanmar
- Coordinates: 16°37′0″N 94°17′47″E
- Country: Myanmar
- Region: Ayeyarwady

Area
  - Total: 0.36 km^{2} (0.14 sq mi)
- Elevation: 24 m (79 ft)
- Time zone: UTC+6:30 (Myanmar Standard Time)

Myingyi Kyun, also known as High Island, is a small island off the coast of Ayeyarwady Region, Burma.

== Geography ==
Myingyi Kyun is 0.8 kilometres (0.50 mi) long and 0.4 kilometres (0.25 mi) wide. It is located 2 kilometres (1.2 mi) away from the coast.

The island is wooded and rises to a height of 24 metres (79 ft). It is part of a group of small islands and reefs lying west of Migyaungaung (Alligator Head).

=== Nearby islands ===
- Thityaung Kyun, also known as Little Quoin Island, 16°37′14″N 94°19′15″E is a group of two islets, the largest of which is 0.5 kilometres (0.31 mi) long, located 2.2 kilometres (1.4 mi) to the east of Myingyi Kyun's eastern end.
- West Reef 16°37′15″N 94°16′45″E is a cluster of rocky islets located 1.3 kilometres (0.81 mi) to the west of Myingyi Kyun's northwestern point.
- North Reef 16°37′53″N 94°17′28″E, a cluster of rocky islets located 1.1 kilometres (0.68 mi) to the north of Myingyi Kyun's northwestern point.
- South Reef 16°36′1″N 94°17′46″E is a small rocky islet located 1.5 kilometres (0.93 mi) to the south of Myingyi Kyun's southern point.
- Saba Island 16°35′49″N 94°18′39″E is a small islet located between South Reef and Alligator Head.
- Thebyu Kyun, also known as Milestone Rock, 16°39′11″N 94°19′49″E is a 12.5 metres (41 ft) high islet located 5 kilometres (3.1 mi) to the northeast of Myingyi Kyun's northeastern shore.

== See also ==
- List of islands of Burma
