= Be-in Kyun =

- Island
- Location within Myanmar
- Coordinates: 17°45′34″N 94°29′00″E
- Country: Myanmar
- State: Rakhine

Area
  - Total: 0.3 km^{2} (0.12 sq mi)
- Elevation: 4 m (13 ft)
- Time zone: UTC+6:30 (Myanmar Standard Time)

Be-in Kyun, also known as Abhay Island, is a small island off the coast of Rakhine State, Burma.

== Geography ==
Be-in Kyun is 1.1 km long and 0.35 km wide. The island is flat, rising to a maximum height of 4 m. It is located 1.2 km away from the mainland coast.

=== Nearby islands ===
There is a small bushy islet in the middle of the sound separating Be-in Kyun from the continental shore.

== See also ==
- List of islands of Burma
