= Kalegauk Island =

- Island
- Location within Myanmar
- Coordinates: 15°32′45″N 97°39′15″E
- Country: Myanmar
- State: Mon

Area
  - Total: 13.5 km^{2} (5.2 sq mi)
- Elevation: 159 m (522 ft)
- Time zone: UTC+6:30 (Myanmar Standard Time)

Kalegauk Island is an island in Ye Township, Mon State, Burma (Myanmar). It is located in the Andaman Sea, 8.25 kilometres (5.13 mi) from the coast of Mon State.

== Geography ==
The island has a long shape with a length of over 10 km (6 mi) and a width of 1.6 km (1.0 mi) in its widest area. In its northern part rises a 159 metres (522 ft) high summit. Kalegauk Island is located 35 kilometres (22 mi) to the NNW of the mouth of the Ye River.

=== Nearby islands ===
Small Cavendish Island lies 0.5 km (0.3 mi) off the southern point of Kalegauk Island. It is a small bean-shaped islet only about 0.4 km (0.2 mi) long, but it has a 97 metres (318 ft) high summit.

== See also ==
- List of islands of Burma
