= Mon State Cultural Museum =

- မွန်ယဉ်ကျေးမှုပြတိုက်
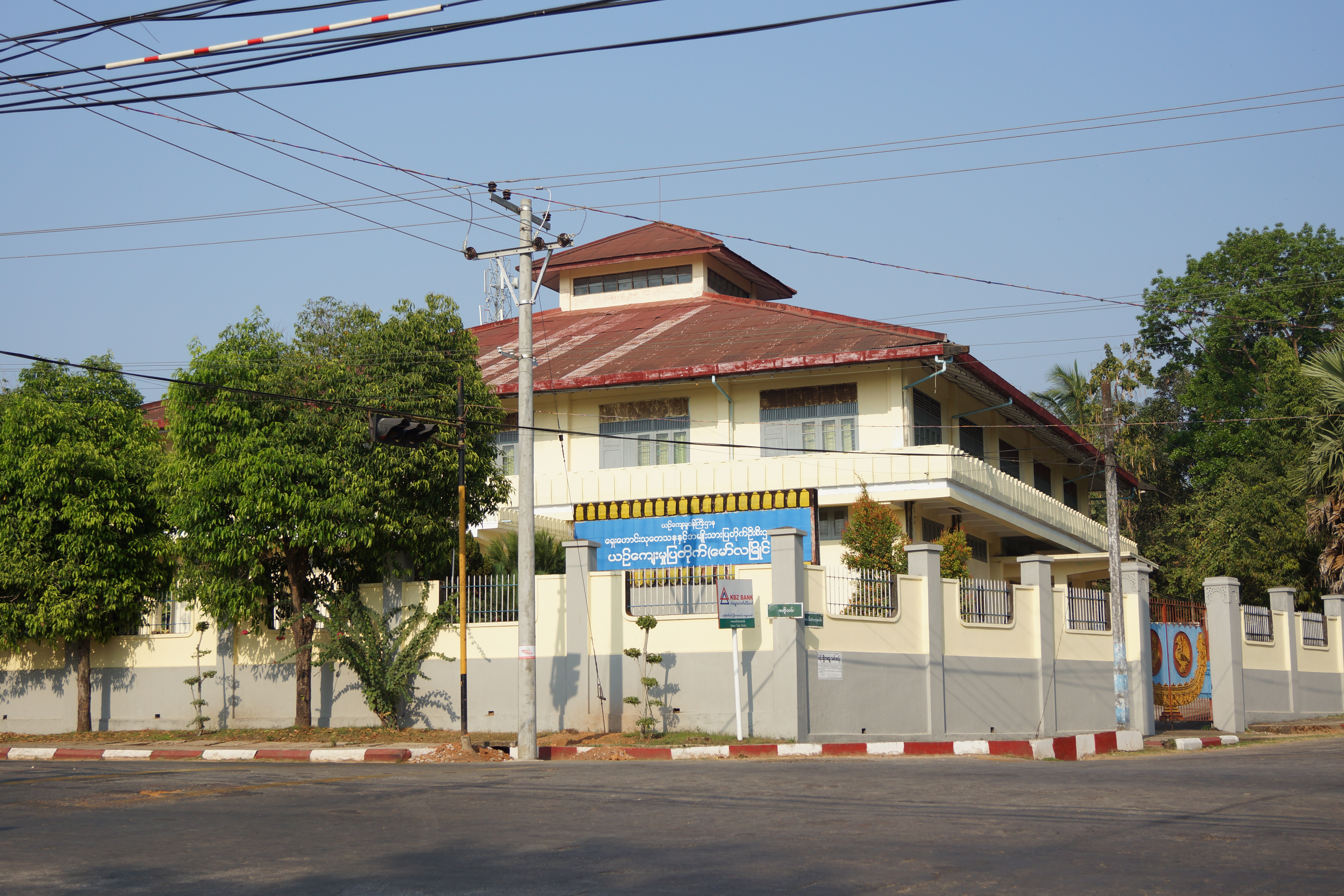
- Established: 1 February 1955; 71 years ago
- Location: Mawlamyine, Mon State, Myanmar
- Type: Cultural Museum
- Owner: Ministry of Religious Affairs and Culture (Myanmar)

The Mon State Cultural Museum (Burmese: မွန်ယဉ်ကျေးမှုပြတိုက်), formerly Mon Ethnic Cultural Museum, is a museum located at No 50, Htawai Bridge Road & Baho Road, in Mawlamyine, Mon State in Myanmar. It was established in 1955. It is under the management of Department of Archaeology and National Museum (Myanmar).

== Collections ==
=== Mon culture ===
The museum mainly displays traditional costumes, Buddhist artefacts, sculptures, palm-leaf manuscript, handicrafts, bronzeware, silverware, coins and figurines of the ethnic Mon people who founded one the earliest civilisations in Mainland Southeast Asia, and were responsible for the spread of Theravada Buddhism in Mainland Southeast Asia.

Essentially, the museum houses ceramic art of Mon kingdoms including Martaban jars and Mon musical instruments that can only be seen in the world museums.

Moreover, it exhibits a manuscript copy of Myazedi Stone Inscription (AD 1113) in Mon language and a replica of Ceremonial helmet of Queen regnant Shin Sawbu (the real one is at the V&A Museum, London).

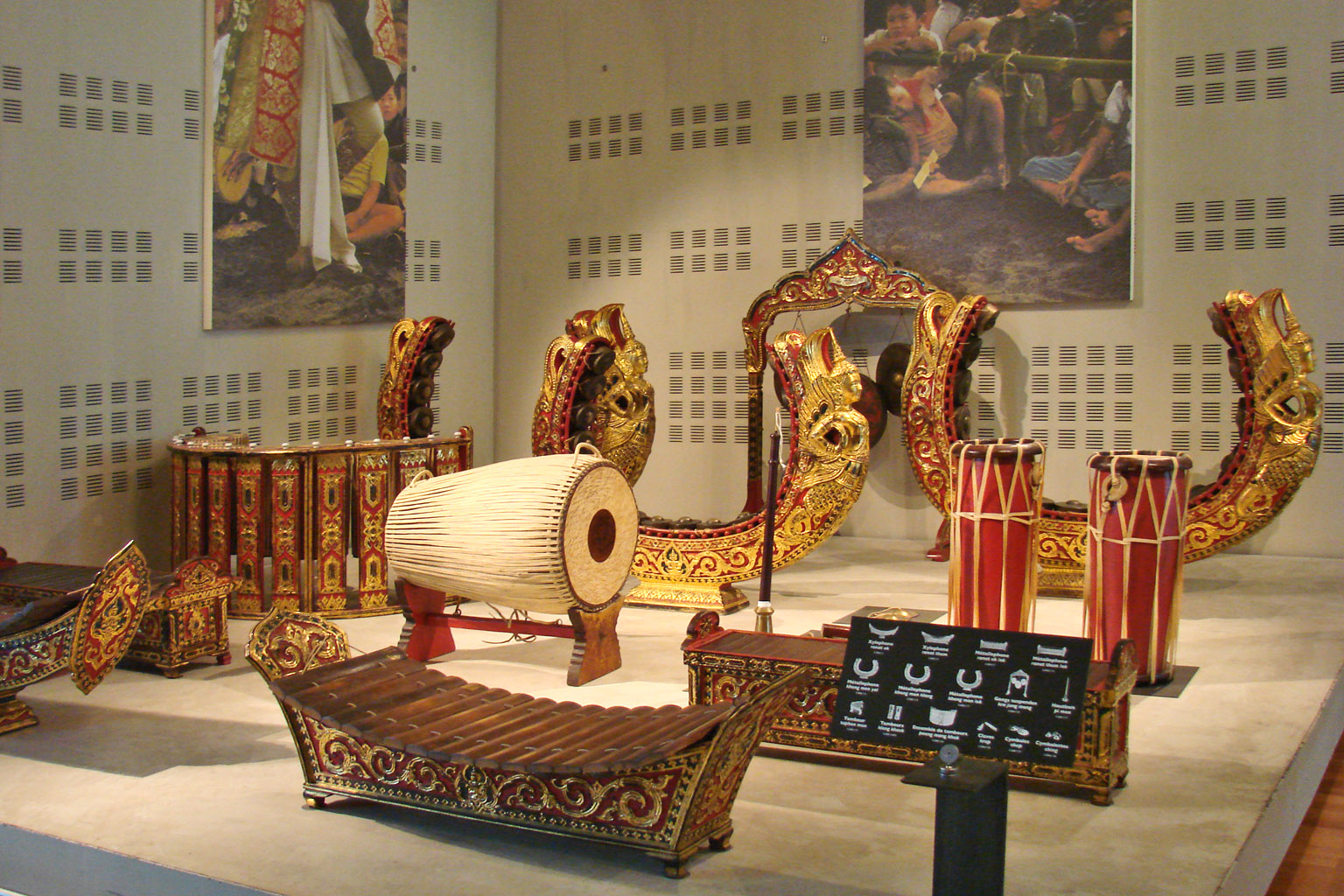
Mon musical instruments exhibited at Cité de la Musique, Paris

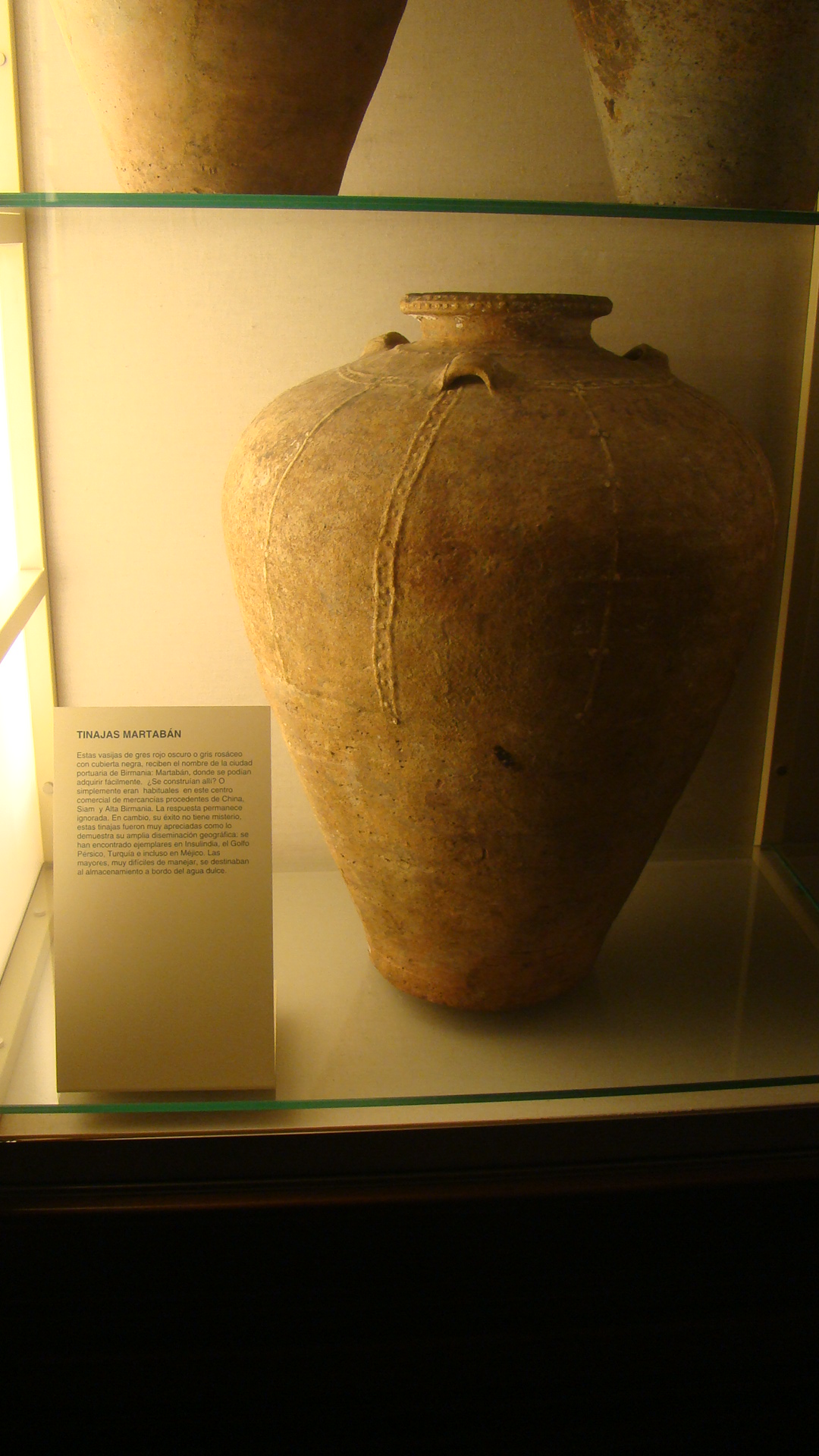
A Martaban jar in the Naval Museum of Madrid, Spain

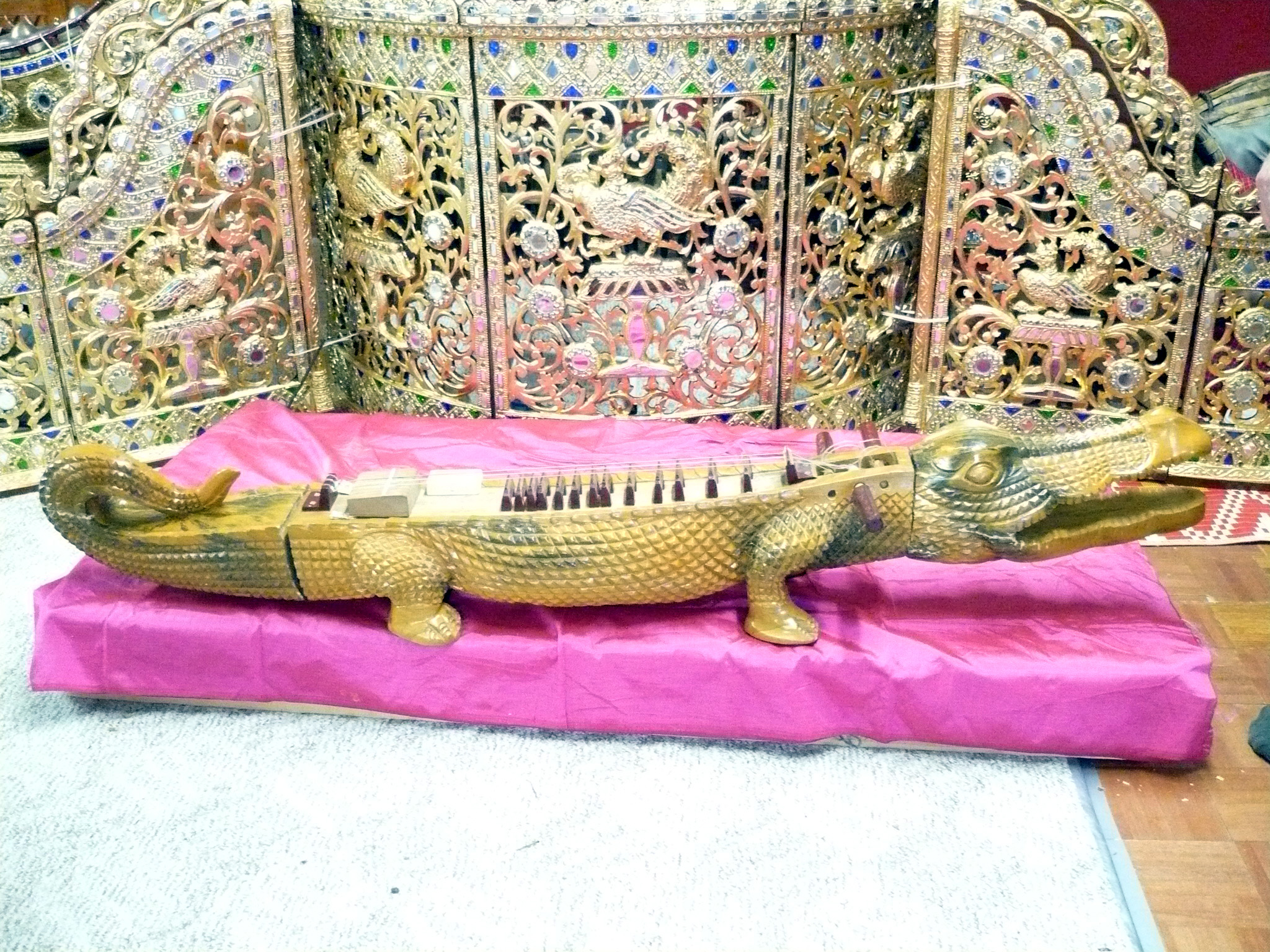
A kyam at Fort Wayne, USA

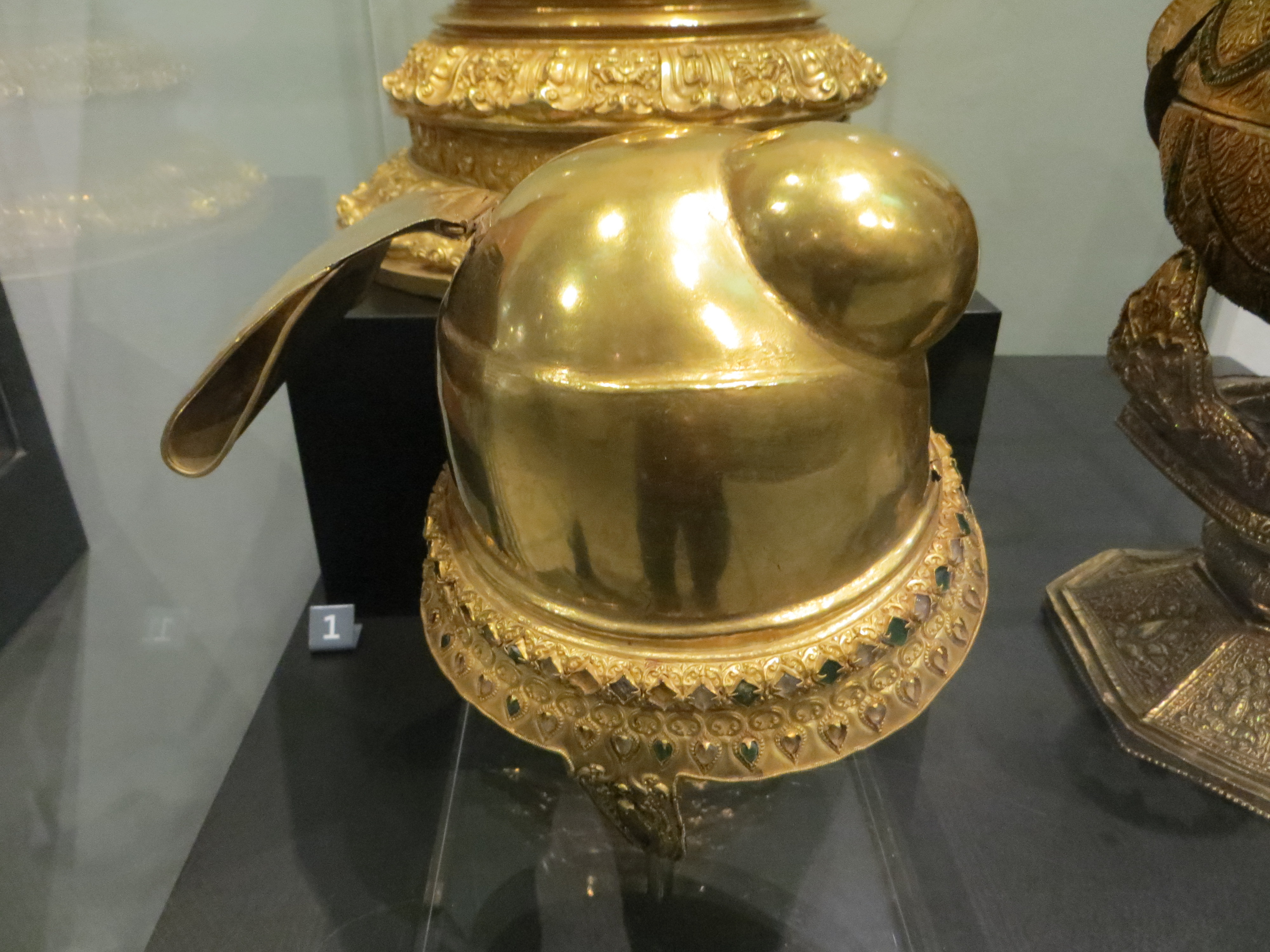
Ceremonial helmet of Queen regnant Shin Sawbu, now at the V&A Museum, London

=== Other cultures ===
The museum also displays artefacts of the Pyu people, Taungoo culture and Konbaung culture including the 19th century divans used by Konbaung dynasty's Queen Seindon and Princess Myat Phaya Galay, who resided in Mawlamyine in the late 19th century or the early 20th century.

== Entry ==
Museum's opening hour is 09:30 AM – 04:30 PM (Tuesday to Sunday) except public holidays.

The museum entry fee are charged at 5,000 Kyats (approximately US$3) for foreign visitors, 500 Kyats for local adults and free-of-charges for school children.

== See also ==
- Mon–Khmer languages
- Early history of Thailand
- Prehistory of Myanmar
