= Nantha Kyun =

Nantha Kyun နံသာကျွန်း
- Island
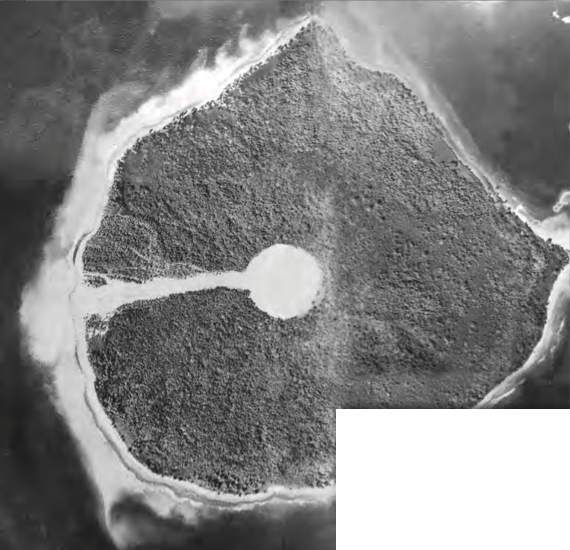
- Sky view of the island taken in 1945, showing only one prominent mudflow. Today, multiple mudflows are visible.

- Location within Myanmar
- Coordinates: 18°3′45″N 94°5′25″E
- Country: Myanmar
- State: Rakhine

Area
  - Total: 2.3 km^{2} (0.89 sq mi)
- Elevation: 168 m (551 ft)
- Time zone: UTC+6:30 (Myanmar Standard Time)

Nantha Kyun is an island off the coast of Rakhine State, Burma. Due to the strong smell emitted by the island's mud volcano, the island was known to the British Empire during the British rule in Burma as Foul Island. This was the site of Operation Boston, a joint US-UK reconnaissance mission overseen by Lord Mountbatten and carried out by Operational Group Command and OSS Detachment 404 during World War II.

== Geography ==
The island is 2.4 kilometres (1.5 mi) long and 1.7 kilometres (1.1 mi) wide. It is located roughly 30 km (19 mi) to the southwest of the Maw Yon headland in the Rakhine coast.

Nantha Kyun rises to a height of 168 metres (551 ft) and has a large active mud volcano in the middle. It is thickly wooded except on its western shores where the terrain is scarred between the crater and the shoreline.

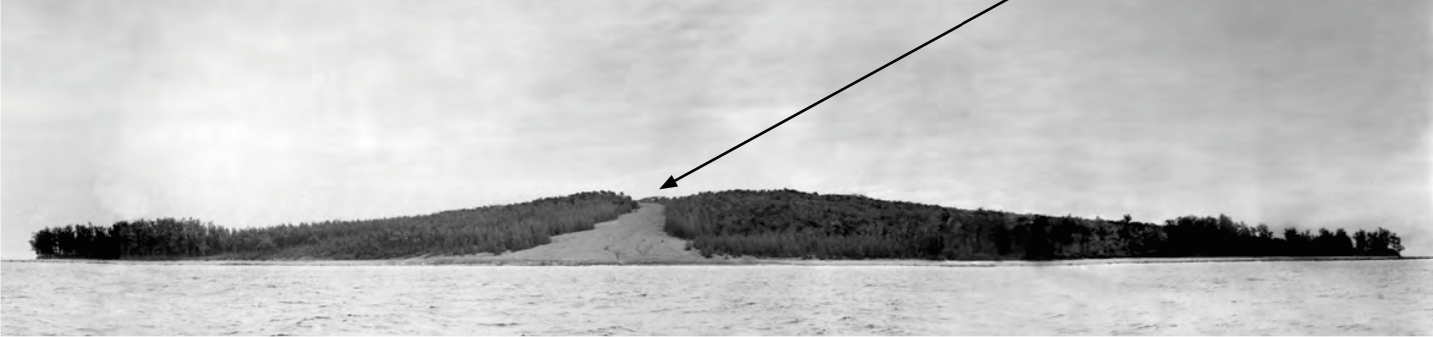
Side view of Nantha Kyun. Photograph captured by members of the Office of Strategic Services in 1945. The arrow points to the caldera of the mud volcano.

== Kyun Nantha Marine National Park ==
The Ministry of Natural Resources and Environmental Conservation designated 23,000 acres (comprising 781 acres of land and 22,219 acres of water) in Gwa Township, Thandwe District, Rakhine State, as the "Kyun Nantha Marine National Park" for biodiversity conservation. This designation, based on the Biodiversity Conservation and Protected Areas Law of 2018, was announced in Notification No. 50/2024 and took effect on 12 June 2024.

=== Nearby islands ===
- Unguan, located about 45 kilometres (28 mi) to the NNE. Highest point 40 metres (130 ft).

== See also ==
- List of islands of Burma
- List of protected areas of Myanmar
