= Apaw-ye Kyun =

- Island
- Location within Myanmar
- Coordinates: 18°22′30″N 94°19′20″E
- Country: Myanmar
- State: Rakhine

Area
  - Total: 0.7 km^{2} (0.27 sq mi)
- Elevation: 90 m (300 ft)
- Time zone: UTC+6:30 (Myanmar Standard Time)

Apaw-ye Kyun or Apaw Ye Kyun (Burmese: အပေါ်ရဲကျွန်း) is an island off the coast of Rakhine State, Burma.

== Geography ==
Apaw-ye Kyun is a bluff island 1.4 km (1 mi) long and 0.4 km (0 mi) wide. It is separated from the Rakhine coast by a 0.5 km (0 mi) wide sound.

The island is wooded and rises to a height of 90 metres (295 feet). There are mud volcanoes about 2 km (1 mi) to the west and the SSW of the island.

== See also ==
- List of islands of Burma
