= Zalat Taung =

- Island
- Location within Myanmar
- Coordinates: 18°32′10″N 94°14′0″E
- Country: Myanmar
- State: Rakhine

Area
  - Total: 0.8 km^{2} (0.31 sq mi)
- Elevation: 37 m (121 ft)
- Time zone: UTC+6:30 (Myanmar Standard Time)

Zalat Taung is an island off the coast of Rakhine State, Burma.

== Geography ==
Zalat Taung is 1.3 km (0.8 mi) long and 0.5 km (0.3 mi) wide. The island is sparsely wooded and rises to a height of 37 m (121 ft) above sea level. It has a small settlement by its north-facing cove. It is separated from the Rakhine coast by a 0.6 km (0.4 mi) wide sound.

Zalat Taung is located at the mouth of the Sandoway (Thandwe) river.

== See also ==
- List of islands of Burma
