= Myingun Island =

Myingun Island မြေငူကျွန်း
- Island
- Location within Myanmar
- Coordinates: 19°58′0″N 92°59′15″E
- Country: Myanmar
- State: Rakhine State

Area
  - Total: 42 km^{2} (16 sq mi)
- Elevation: 306 m (1,004 ft)
- Time zone: UTC+6:30 (MMT)

Myingun Island (Burmese: မြေငူကျွန်း), also known as Myengu Island, is an island in the Bay of Bengal. It is administrated by Myanmar and belongs to Rakhine State. The island is located 5 kilometres (3 miles) to the south of Sittwe, separated from the continental shore by a 2-kilometre-wide (1.2 mi) strait.

== Geography ==
The island stretches parallel to the coast and has a length of 33 km (21 mi) and a maximum width of 3.8 km (2.4 mi). There are two localities on the island, Sandawshin in the south and Pyaingdaung in the north. Both villages are located on the eastern coast of the island.

== See also ==
- List of islands of Myanmar
