= Unguan =

- Island
- Location within Myanmar
- Coordinates: 18°26′10″N 93°54′20″E
- Country: Myanmar
- State: Rakhine

Area
  - Total: 0.4 km^{2} (0.15 sq mi)
- Elevation: 40 m (130 ft)
- Time zone: UTC+6:30 (Myanmar Standard Time)

Unguan is a small island off the coast of Rakhine State, Myanmar.

== Geography ==
The island is 1 kilometre (0.62 miles) long and 0.4 kilometres (0.2 miles) wide. It is located 33 kilometres (21 miles) to the southeast of Cheduba's southern end. It rises to a height of 40 metres (130 feet) and is densely wooded.

=== Nearby islands ===
- Ye Kyun, located 22 kilometres (14 miles) to the NW near Cheduba Island.
- Nantha Kyun, located about 45 kilometres (28 miles) SSE of Unguan. The highest point is 168 metres (551 feet) above sea level.

== See also ==
- List of islands of Burma
