= Mon State Government =

- Seal of the Government

- Flag of Mon State

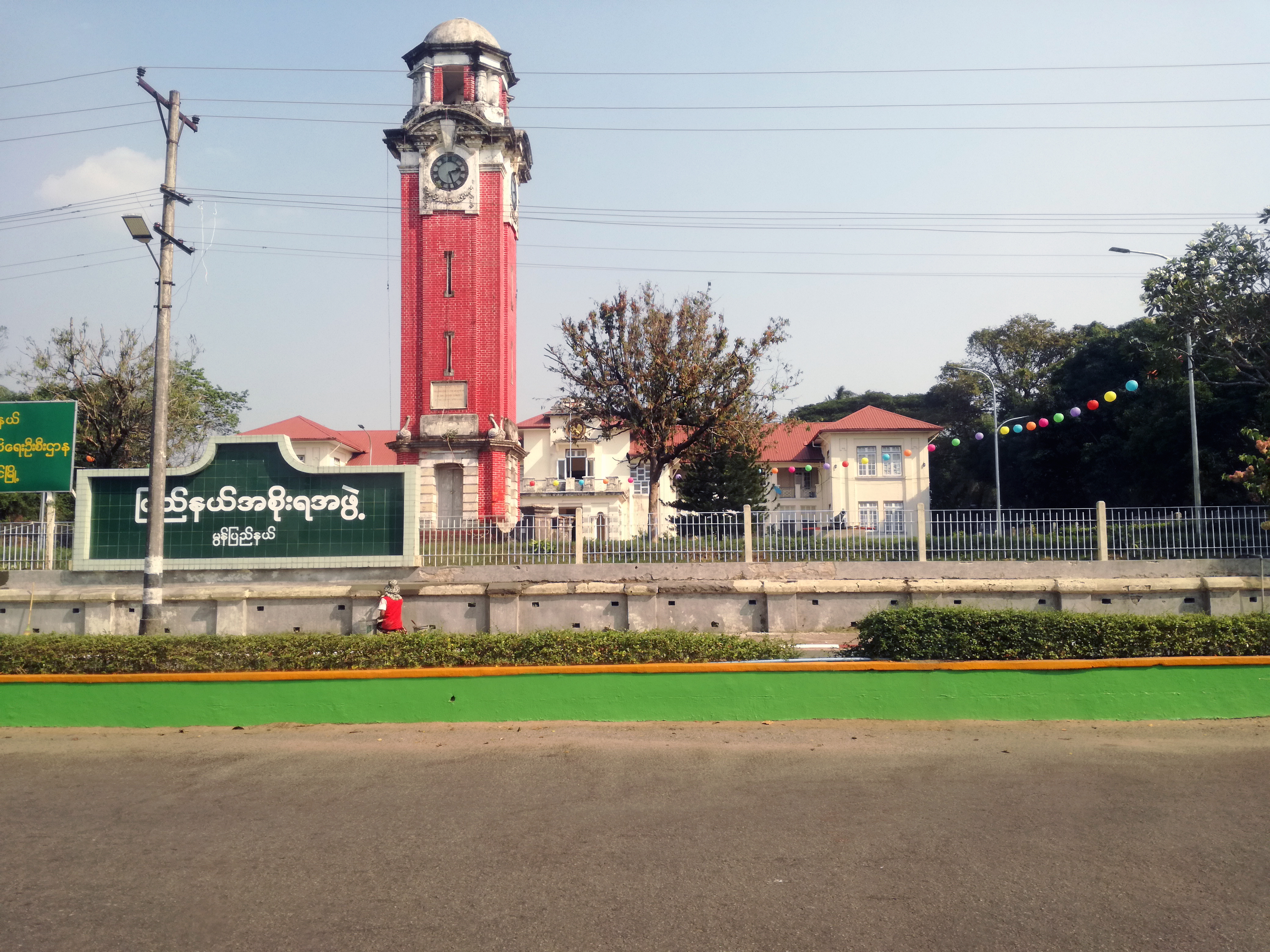
- Office of the Mon State Government

Government overview
- Formed: 30 March 2010
- Jurisdiction: Mon State Hluttaw
- Headquarters: Mawlamyine, Mon State
- Government executive: Aung Kyi Thein, Chief Minister
- Parent department: Government of Myanmar
- Website: www.monstate.gov.mm

The Mon State Government is the cabinet of Mon State, Myanmar. The cabinet is led by chief minister, Aung Kyi Thein.

The former chief minister, Zaw Lin Tun was retired by the State Administration Council on 2 February 2023, a day after the second anniversary of the 2021 coup.

== Cabinet (April 2016–January 2021) ==
No.	Name	Portfolio
(1)	Min Min Oo (30 March 2016 – 23 February 2017)	Chief Minister
(1)	Aye Zan, Dr	Chief Minister
(2)	Min Kyaw Lwin	Minister of Municipal Affairs and Construction
(3)	Nay Htut Oo, Col.	Minister of Security and Border Affairs
(4)	Hla Tun	Minister of Electricity, Energy and Industry
(5)	Htein Lin, Dr.	Minister of Social Affairs
(6)	Tun Htay	Minister of Agriculture, Livestock and Transportation
(7)	Min Kyi Win, Dr. (or) Naing Kyi Win	Minister of Natural Resources and Environment
(8)	Wunna Kyaw	Minister of Planning, Finance, Immigration and Population
(9)	Shwe Myint	Minister of Bamar Ethnic Affairs
(10)	San Wint Khaing	Minister of Pa-O Ethnic Affairs
(11)	Aung Myint Khaing	Minister of Kayin Ethnic Affairs
(12)	Aye Aye Mu	State Advocate
(13)	Thein Thein Oo	State Auditor
