= Kyaikmaraw =

Kyaikmaraw Mon: ကျာ်မြဟ် Burmese: ကျိုက်မရောမြို့
- Town
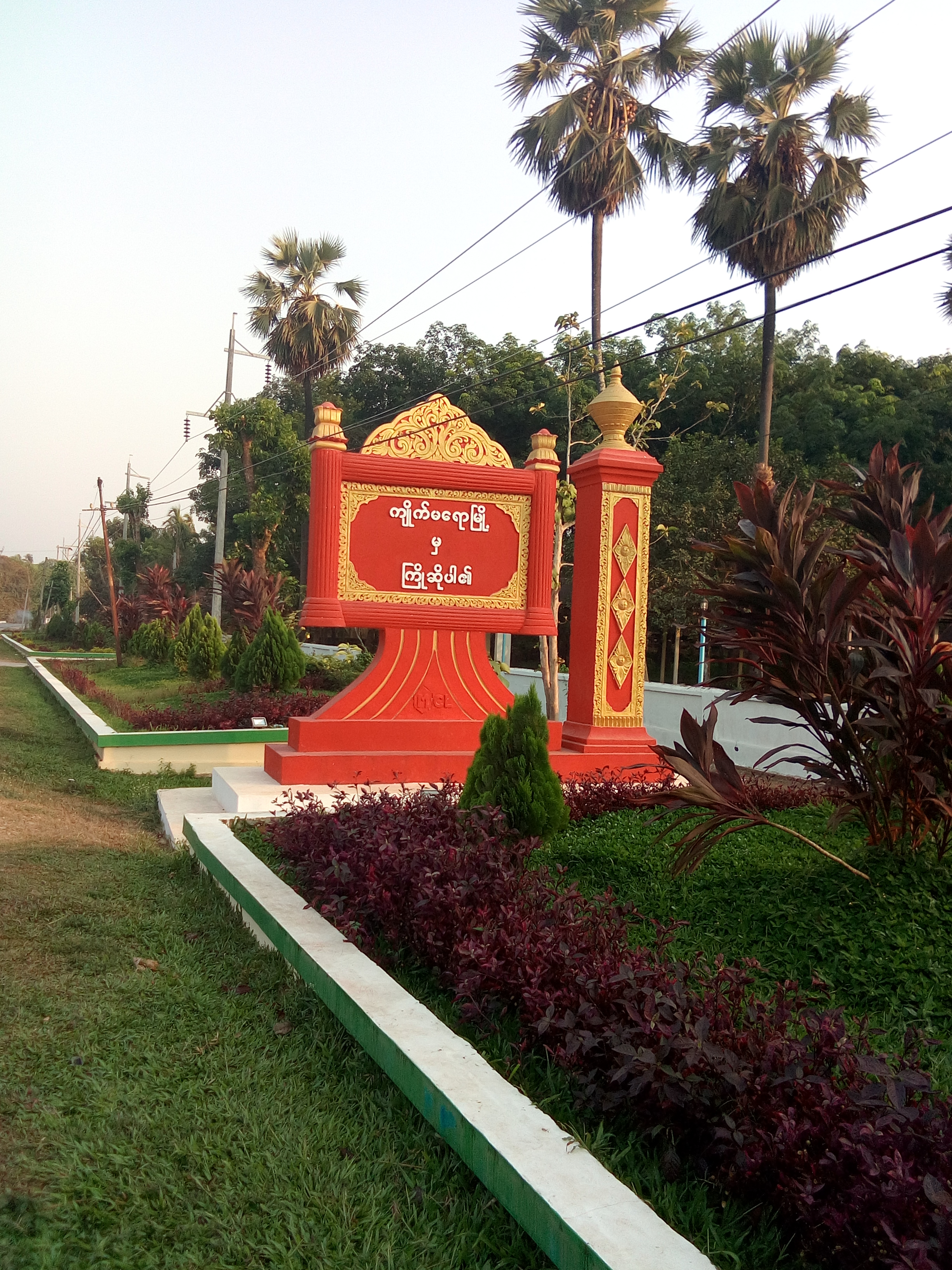
- Sign seen upon entering Kyaikmaraw from Mawlamyine. The sign reads: "A warm welcome from Kyaikmaraw."

- Location in Burma
- Coordinates: 16°22′31″N 97°44′1″E
- Country: Myanmar
- Division: Mon State
- Elevation: 46 ft (14 m)

Population (2024)
  - Total: 147,740
  - Religions: Buddhism
- Time zone: UTC+6.30 (MST)
- Area code: 57

Kyaikmaraw (Burmese: ကျိုက်မရောမြို့; Mon: ကျာ်မြဟ် [caik pəròh]) is a town in the Mon State of south-east Myanmar, 4 kilometres (2.5 mi) southeast of Mawlamyine.

== Etymology ==
"Kyaikmaraw" derives from the Mon language term "Kyaikparo" (Mon: ကျာ်မြဟ်; /caik pəròh/), which means "prominent Buddha."

== History ==
Inscriptions from 1455 in Kyaikmaraw records the dedication of land to a shrine by Shin Sawbu, then Queen of Pegu, and is the earliest dated inscription of Middle Mon.

In 2024, Kyaikmaraw was hit by artillery barrages and air raids, which resulted in the injury of 2 people.

== Attractions ==
Kyaikmaraw Paya, a huge Buddha image sitting in the "westerner manner" is a major tourist site in town. It was built in 1455 by Queen Shin Saw Pu, the only female ruler in the history of Myanmar.

== Notable people ==
- Tun Tun Min, Lethwei former World Champion
