= Kaingthaung Island =

Island in Myanmar

Geography
- Location: Andaman Sea, Myanmar
- Coordinates: 15.73°N 95.04375°E
- Area: 11.4 km^{2} (4.4 sq mi)

Administration
- Myanmar

Additional information
- Time zone: MST (UTC+6:30)

Kaingthaung Island is an island in Myanmar. It is located in the Ayeyarwady Region, in the south-central part of the country, 500 km south of the capital Naypyidaw. The area is 11.4 square kilometers.

There is a major settlement on the northeastern part of the island, and several smaller ones on the rest. There is a pagoda by the island, which received damage during the 2004 Sumatra-Andaman earthquake. There have also recently been issues with rising sea levels submerging the island and threatening its residents.
