= Wa Kyun =

- Island
- Location within Myanmar
- Coordinates: 15°12′N 97°43′E
- Country: Myanmar
- State: Mon

Area
  - Total: 3.5 km^{2} (1.4 sq mi)
- Elevation: 135 m (443 ft)
- Time zone: UTC+6:30 (Myanmar Standard Time)

Wa Kyun is an island in the Andaman Sea, right off the coast of Mon State, in the southern area of Burma. This 2 kilometres (1.2 mi) long island is located in the midst of a shoal or shallow area. It is covered with dense forest and rises to a height of 135 metres (443 ft).

== Geography ==
Wa Kyun is in the center of a chain of small coastal islands that lie off the mouth of the Ye River. The island of Kokunye Kyun is located 10 kilometres (6.2 mi) to the north of Wa Kyun.

=== Nearby islands ===
There are three smaller islands located on the same shoal as Wa Kyun:

- Hngetpiaw Kyun 15°11′N 97°43′E, 0.3 km in length narrow and thickly wooded islet, 46 metres high, located 1.6 km to the SW of Wa Kyun
- Nat Kyun 15°12′N 97°44′E, 1.15 km long island, 135 m high, located 2 km to the south of Wa Kyun
- Kyettaik Kyun 15°10′N 97°45′E, very small 24 m high islet, 0.5 km in diameter, located 2 km to the southeast of Nat Kyun

== See also ==
- List of islands of Burma
