= Geography of Myanmar =

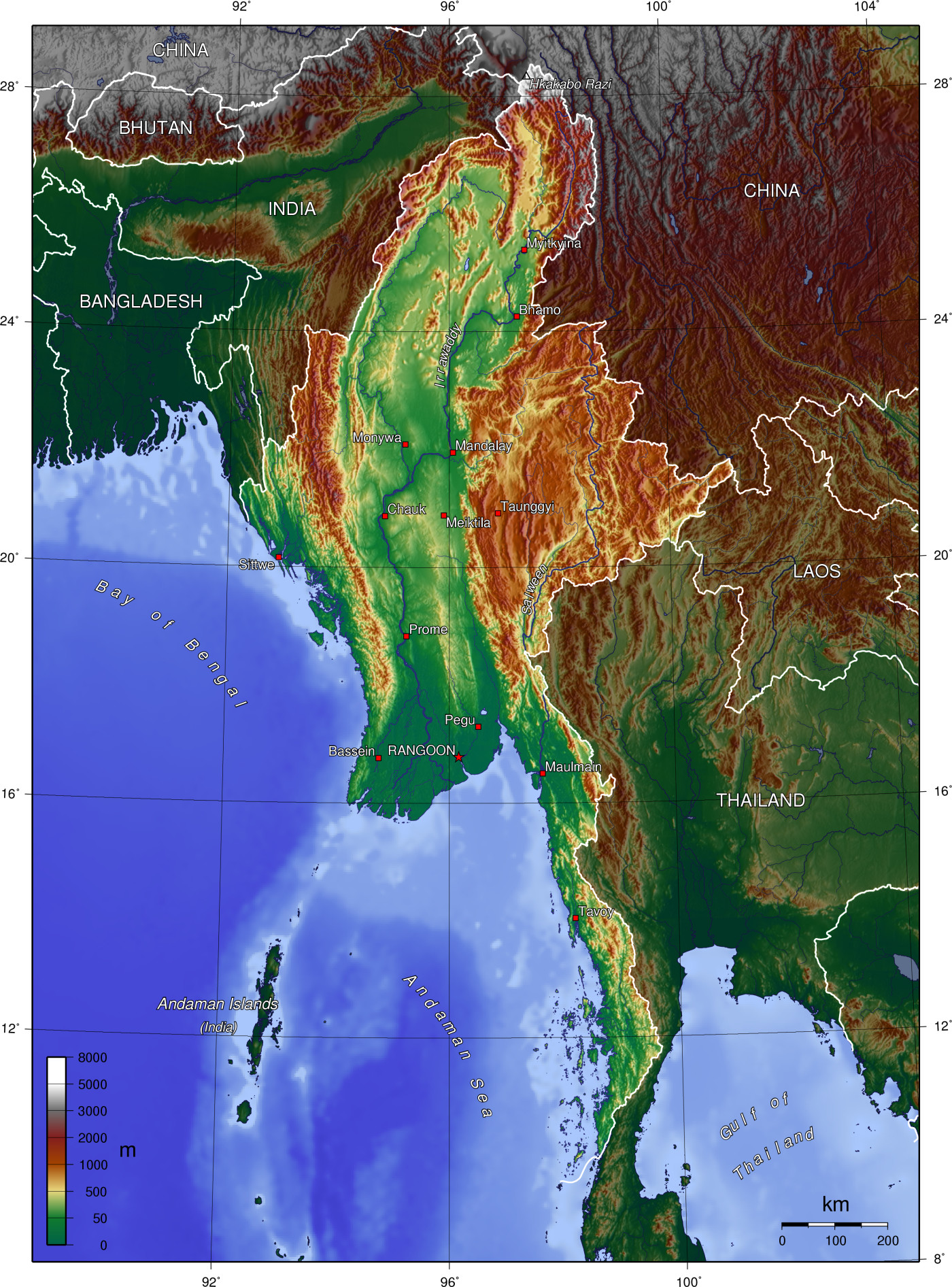
- Continent: Asia
- Region: Mainland Southeast Asia
- Coordinates: 22°00′N 98°00′E
- Area: Ranked 40th
  - Total: 261,228 sq mi (676,580 km^{2})
  - Land: 96.94%
  - Water: 3.06%
- Coastline: 1,384 mi (2,227 km)
- Borders: Total land borders: 4,053 mi (6,523 km); Bangladesh: 168 mi (270 km); People's Republic of China: 1,323 mi (2,129 km); India: 912 mi (1,468 km); Laos; 148 mi (238 km); Thailand: 1,501 mi (2,416 km)
- Highest point: Hkakabo Razi; 19,294 ft (5,881 m)
- Lowest point: Andaman Sea; 0 ft (0 m) (sea level)
- Longest river: Ayeyarwady River
- Largest lake: Indawgyi Lake
- Natural resources: Jade, Rubies, Sapphires, Petroleum, Natural Gas, Gold, Teak, Tin, Antimony, Zinc, Hydropower potential, Copper, Iron, Coal
- Exclusive economic zone: 205,706 mi^{2} (532,780 km^{2})

Myanmar (also known as Burma) is the northwesternmost country of Mainland Southeast Asia. Its land area covers 261,228 square miles (676,580 km^{2}), which makes it the second-largest country in Southeast Asia and the largest on Mainland Southeast Asia. The kite-shaped country stretches from 10'N to 20'N for 1,275 miles (2,052 km), with a long tail running along the west coast of the Malay Peninsula.

Myanmar lies along the Indian and Eurasian plates and to the southeast of the Tibetan Plateau. The Bay of Bengal is to the southwest, and the Andaman Sea is to the south. Nearly half of the land is mountainous, forming a horseshoe around the central lowlands. The Arakan Mountains are on the west and the Shan Hills dominate the east. The central valley follows the Irrawaddy River. The basin has around 39.5 million people and the largest city Yangon. There are 135 officially-recognised ethnic groups. It is near major shipping lanes of the Indian Ocean. There was a silk road from the Bay of Bengal to China. The neighbouring countries are China in the north, India and Bangladesh to the west, and Laos and Thailand to the east.

== Area and boundaries ==
=== Area ===
- Total: 261,228 square miles (676,580 km^{2})
  - Country rank in the world: 39th
- Land: 252,321 square miles (653,510 km^{2})
- Water: 8,910 square miles (23,100 km^{2})

=== Maritime borders ===
The southern maritime boundary follows coordinates marked by both Myanmar and Thailand towards the maritime tripoint with India's Andaman and Nicobar Islands. The maritime India-Myanmar border resumes end south of Coco Islands before heading towards Myanmar's narrow boundary with international Bay of Bengal waters. Myanmar has a total coastline of 2,227 miles (3,584 km) and has several islands and archipelagos, most notably the Mergui Archipelago. The country's total water area is 23,100 square miles (60,000 km^{2}), including an Exclusive Economic Zone covering 532,780 square miles (1,379,900 km^{2}).

=== Land borders ===
Myanmar has a land border totalling 4,053 miles (6,523 km) in length, bordering five countries and encompassing a total land area of 261,228 square miles (676,580 km^{2}).

The Bangladesh-Myanmar border begins at the mouth of the Naf River at the Bay of Bengal and head north around the Mayu Range in a wide arc before head back north through the Chittagong Hill Tracts to the tripoint with India at the peak of Teen Matha for a total of 168 miles (270 km).

The India-Myanmar border heads north through the Chin Hills towards the Tiau River. It follows this river upstream and then through various rivers near Manipur before going northeast through the Patkai range to the Chaukan Pass and the Mishmi Hills for a total of 912 miles (1,468 km).

The tripoint with China and India is disputed due to the Sino-Indian border dispute but lies de facto north of the Diphu Pass. The China-Myanmar border heads northeast to Hkakabo Razi just one mile west of its summit. It then turns southeast following the Hengduan and Gaoligong Mountains through many irregular lines towards the Taping River and Shweli River. It then heads south-eastwards across the far Shan Hills, following hills and rivers, until it reaches the Mekong river. It follows the Mekong until the tripoint with Laos for a grand total of 1,333 miles (2,145 km).

The Laos-Myanmar border runs entirely along the Mekong river from the tripoint with China the tripoint with Thailand at the confluence of the Kok and Mekon Rivers for 148 miles (238 km).

The Myanmar-Thailand border follows the Kok River and Sai River briefly before continuing overland on a series of irregular lines southwards through the Daen Lao Range before heading southwest to the Salween River. The border follows the Salween and then the Moei River before going overland again through the Tenasserim Hills towards the Malay Peninsula. Near Prachuap Khiri Khan, the border comes within 6.81 miles (10.96 km) to the Gulf of Thailand. It then heads south towards the Kraburi River which it then follows towards a wide estuary before ending in the Andaman Sea, forming Myanmar's longest border at 1,501 miles (2,416 km).

== Climate ==
Myanmar (Burma) map of Köppen climate classification

Tropical monsoon in the lowlands below 3,281 feet (1,000 m); cloudy, rainy, hot, humid summers (southwest monsoon, June to September); less cloudy, scant rainfall, mild temperatures, lower humidity during winter (northeast monsoon, December to April).

Myanmar has three seasons: the cool and drier northeast monsoon running from late October to mid-February, the hot and dry intermonsoonal season from mid-February to mid-May and the rainy southwest monsoon from mid-May to late-October. Colloquially, they are called the winter, summer and rainy seasons respectively. The alternating mountain ranges and valleys create alternate zones of heavy and subdued precipitation during the monsoon season, with the majority of the country's precipitation coming from the southwest monsoons.

Climate varies in the highlands depending on elevation; subtropical temperate climate at around 8,202 feet (2,500 m), temperate at 9,843 feet (3,000 m), cool, alpine at 11,483 feet (3,500 m) and above the alpine zone, cold, harsh tundra and Arctic climate. The higher elevations are subject to heavy snowfall, especially in the north. Distance from the sea also affects temperature and inland highlands can experience daily temperature ranges spanning 12'C despite the tropical latitude.

Climate data for Yangon (Kaba–Aye) 1981–2010, extremes 1881–1990
Month	Jan	Feb	Mar	Apr	May	Jun	Jul	Aug	Sep	Oct	Nov	Dec	Year
Record high °C (°F)	38.9 (102.0)	38.9 (102.0)	40.0 (104.0)	41.1 (106.0)	42.0 (107.6)	37.8 (100.0)	37.8 (100.0)	34.4 (93.9)	38.9 (102.0)	37.8 (100.0)	38.9 (102.0)	35.6 (96.1)	42.0 (107.6)
Mean daily maximum °C (°F)	33.2 (91.8)	35.2 (95.4)	36.7 (98.1)	37.5 (99.5)	34.2 (93.6)	30.8 (87.4)	30.3 (86.5)	30.0 (86.0)	30.9 (87.6)	32.2 (90.0)	33.1 (91.6)	32.5 (90.5)	33.1 (91.6)
Daily mean °C (°F)	24.8 (76.6)	26.5 (79.7)	28.6 (83.5)	31.0 (87.8)	29.2 (84.6)	27.4 (81.3)	26.8 (80.2)	26.9 (80.4)	27.5 (81.5)	27.6 (81.7)	27.3 (81.1)	25.0 (77.0)	27.4 (81.3)
Mean daily minimum °C (°F)	16.7 (62.1)	18.4 (65.1)	21.0 (69.8)	23.8 (74.8)	24.3 (75.7)	23.6 (74.5)	23.2 (73.8)	23.2 (73.8)	23.2 (73.8)	23.1 (73.6)	21.3 (70.3)	17.8 (64.0)	21.6 (70.9)
Record low °C (°F)	12.2 (54.0)	13.3 (55.9)	16.1 (61.0)	20.0 (68.0)	20.0 (68.0)	20.0 (68.0)	21.1 (70.0)	20.0 (68.0)	20.0 (68.0)	20.0 (68.0)	15.0 (59.0)	9.2 (48.6)	9.2 (48.6)
Average rainfall mm (inches)	0.4 (0.02)	3.1 (0.12)	12.4 (0.49)	37.8 (1.49)	328.1 (12.92)	565.6 (22.27)	605.8 (23.85)	570.7 (22.47)	393.7 (15.50)	200.3 (7.89)	58.6 (2.31)	6.8 (0.27)	2,783.3 (109.58)
Average rainy days	0.2	0.2	0.4	1.6	12.6	25.3	26.2	26.1	19.5	12.2	4.8	0.2	129.3
Average relative humidity (%)	62	66	69	66	73	85	86	87	85	78	71	65	74
Mean monthly sunshine hours	300	272	290	292	181	80	77	92	97	203	280	288	2,452
Source 1: Norwegian Meteorological Institute (average high and average low, and precipitation 1981–2010), World Meteorological Organization (rainy days 1961–1990), Deutscher Wetterdienst (extremes)
Source 2: Danish Meteorological Institute (sun and relative humidity 1931–1960), Myanmar Times (May record high and December record low) Tokyo Climate Center (mean temperatures 1981–2010)

Climate data for Naypyidaw
Month	Jan	Feb	Mar	Apr	May	Jun	Jul	Aug	Sep	Oct	Nov	Dec	Year
Mean daily maximum °C (°F)	30 (86)	34 (93)	36 (97)	38 (100)	35 (95)	32 (90)	31 (88)	30 (86)	32 (90)	32 (90)	31 (88)	29 (84)	32.5 (90.5)
Mean daily minimum °C (°F)	14 (57)	16 (61)	20 (68)	24 (75)	25 (77)	24 (75)	24 (75)	24 (75)	24 (75)	23 (73)	20 (68)	16 (61)	21.2 (70.2)
Average precipitation mm (inches)	5 (0.2)	2 (0.1)	9 (0.4)	33 (1.3)	154 (6.1)	160 (6.3)	198 (7.8)	229 (9.0)	186 (7.3)	131 (5.2)	37 (1.5)	7 (0.3)	1,151 (45.5)
Average precipitation days	1	0	1	3	14	21	23	24	19	12	4	1	123
Source: Weather2Travel.com. Retrieved 26 March 2013

Climate data for Mandalay (1981–2010, extremes 1889–present)
Month	Jan	Feb	Mar	Apr	May	Jun	Jul	Aug	Sep	Oct	Nov	Dec	Year
Record high °C (°F)	37.2 (99.0)	39.2 (102.6)	42.8 (109.0)	48.0 (118.4)	45.0 (113.0)	42.0 (107.6)	41.6 (106.9)	39.8 (103.6)	43.4 (110.1)	39.2 (102.6)	38.5 (101.3)	34.0 (93.2)	48.0 (118.4)
Mean daily maximum °C (°F)	29.6 (85.3)	32.7 (90.9)	36.6 (97.9)	38.9 (102.0)	36.9 (98.4)	35.2 (95.4)	35.1 (95.2)	34.3 (93.7)	34.0 (93.2)	33.4 (92.1)	31.1 (88.0)	29.1 (84.4)	33.9 (93.0)
Daily mean °C (°F)	21.9 (71.4)	24.4 (75.9)	28.8 (83.8)	31.9 (89.4)	31.3 (88.3)	30.8 (87.4)	30.8 (87.4)	30.2 (86.4)	29.7 (85.5)	28.8 (83.8)	25.7 (78.3)	22.2 (72.0)	28.0 (82.4)
Mean daily minimum °C (°F)	13.7 (56.7)	16.0 (60.8)	20.4 (68.7)	24.7 (76.5)	25.9 (78.6)	26.1 (79.0)	26.2 (79.2)	25.8 (78.4)	25.4 (77.7)	24.0 (75.2)	19.9 (67.8)	15.4 (59.7)	22.0 (71.6)
Record low °C (°F)	8.0 (46.4)	10.0 (50.0)	12.8 (55.0)	13.0 (55.4)	17.4 (63.3)	20.0 (68.0)	20.0 (68.0)	19.5 (67.1)	20.5 (68.9)	18.5 (65.3)	11.1 (52.0)	7.6 (45.7)	7.6 (45.7)
Average rainfall mm (inches)	0.9 (0.04)	3.8 (0.15)	5.8 (0.23)	40.4 (1.59)	130.0 (5.12)	99.5 (3.92)	74.7 (2.94)	132.9 (5.23)	157.1 (6.19)	130.7 (5.15)	36.4 (1.43)	4.9 (0.19)	817.1 (32.17)
Average rainy days	0.4	0.4	0.4	3.3	8.3	7.2	5.9	8.7	8.1	6.8	2.8	0.7	53.0
Average relative humidity (%)	68	58	49	50	66	73	71	76	76	77	74	72	68
Mean monthly sunshine hours	309	280	301	291	267	208	182	168	215	223	269	278	2,991
Source 1: Norwegian Meteorological Institute (average high and average low, and rainfall 1981–2010), World Meteorological Organization (rainy days 1961–1990), Deutscher Wetterdienst (mean temperatures 1991–2010)
Source 2: Danish Meteorological Institute (sun and relative humidity, 1931–1960), Meteo Climat (record highs and lows),

Climate data for Myitkyina (1981-2010, extremes 1951-present)
Month	Jan	Feb	Mar	Apr	May	Jun	Jul	Aug	Sep	Oct	Nov	Dec	Year
Record high °C (°F)	35.0 (95.0)	35.0 (95.0)	38.0 (100.4)	41.1 (106.0)	42.0 (107.6)	40.2 (104.4)	38.3 (100.9)	38.5 (101.3)	37.5 (99.5)	36.2 (97.2)	38.5 (101.3)	35.5 (95.9)	42.0 (107.6)
Mean daily maximum °C (°F)	25.3 (77.5)	27.5 (81.5)	30.4 (86.7)	32.6 (90.7)	33.3 (91.9)	31.6 (88.9)	30.5 (86.9)	32.0 (89.6)	31.7 (89.1)	30.9 (87.6)	28.4 (83.1)	25.8 (78.4)	30.0 (86.0)
Daily mean °C (°F)	18.0 (64.4)	20.3 (68.5)	23.9 (75.0)	26.6 (79.9)	27.6 (81.7)	27.9 (82.2)	27.7 (81.9)	28.3 (82.9)	28.1 (82.6)	26.2 (79.2)	22.5 (72.5)	18.8 (65.8)	24.9 (76.8)
Mean daily minimum °C (°F)	10.4 (50.7)	12.9 (55.2)	16.3 (61.3)	19.7 (67.5)	22.3 (72.1)	24.3 (75.7)	24.5 (76.1)	24.6 (76.3)	23.9 (75.0)	21.5 (70.7)	16.2 (61.2)	11.9 (53.4)	19.0 (66.2)
Record low °C (°F)	3.0 (37.4)	7.5 (45.5)	10.0 (50.0)	10.0 (50.0)	16.1 (61.0)	18.1 (64.6)	18.0 (64.4)	20.0 (68.0)	19.8 (67.6)	15.0 (59.0)	8.0 (46.4)	3.0 (37.4)	3.0 (37.4)
Average rainfall mm (inches)	9.9 (0.39)	21.0 (0.83)	24.0 (0.94)	54.0 (2.13)	218.5 (8.60)	549.2 (21.62)	543.0 (21.38)	398.3 (15.68)	294.7 (11.60)	170.6 (6.72)	25.1 (0.99)	11.7 (0.46)	2,320 (91.34)
Average rainy days (≥ 0.3 mm)	2	7	5	8	15	25	27	28	19	11	3	2	152
Average relative humidity (%)	77	68	64	64	72	83	89	87	85	83	79	78	77
Source 1: Norwegian Meteorological Institute, Deutscher Wetterdienst (mean temperatures 1991–2010, rainy days 1896–1940, humidity 1963–1988)
Source 2: Meteo Climat (record highs and lows)

== Mountains ==
Myanmar's mountains create five distinct physiographic regions.

=== Northern Mountains ===
The Northern Mountains are characterised by complex ranges centred around the eastern ends of the Himalayas and the northeastern limit of the Indian-Australian Plate. The ranges at the southern end of the Hengduan System form the border between Myanmar and China. Hkakabo Razi, the country's highest point at 19,295 feet (5,881 m), is located at the northern end of the country. This mountain is part of a series of parallel ranges that run from the foothills of the Himalaya through the border areas with Assam, Nagaland and Mizoram.

=== Central Lowlands ===
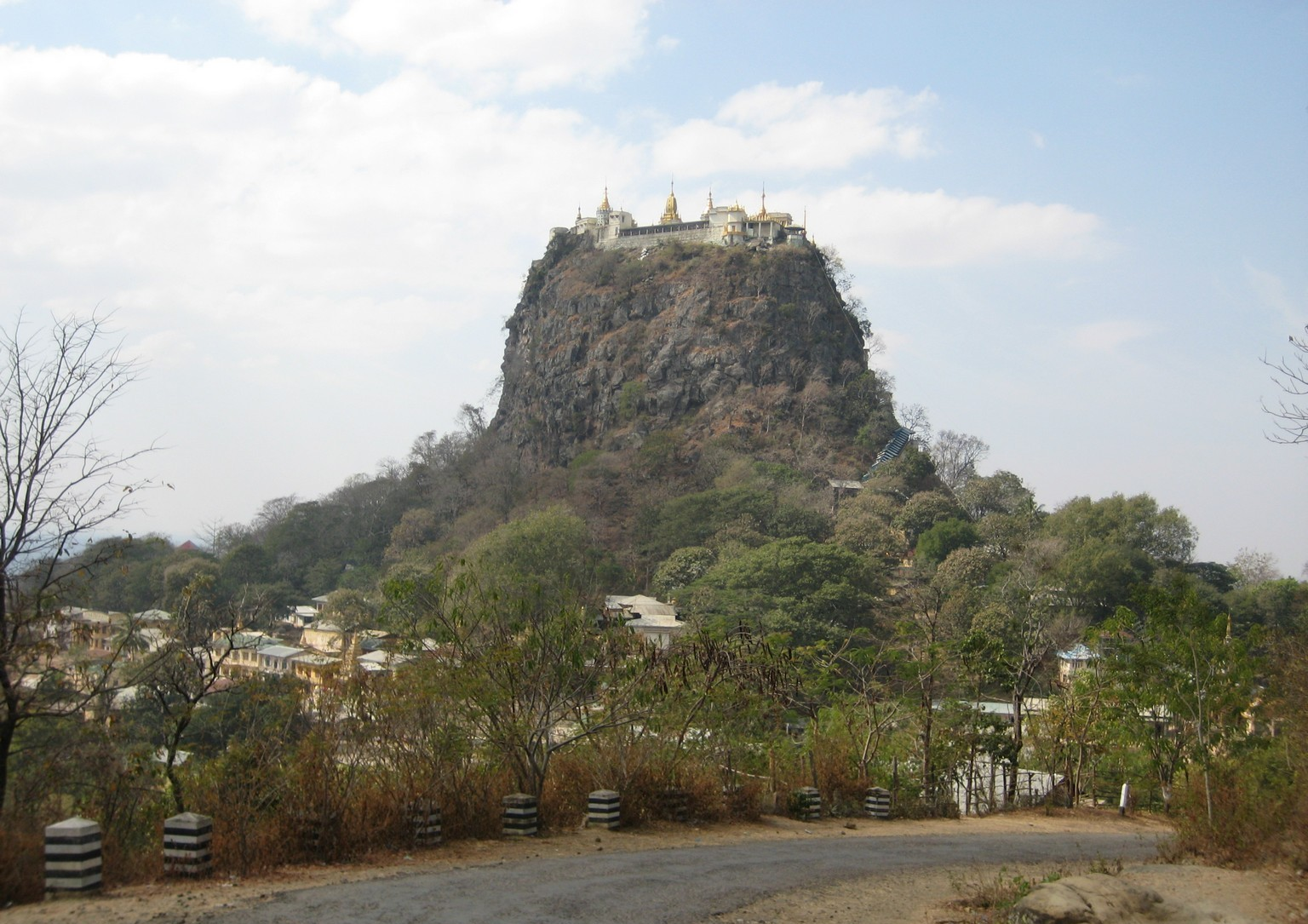
Mount Popa, a dormant volcano in the Central Lowlands

Myanmar is characterised by its Central Lowlands running north–south between several different mountain ranges. This was deeply excavated by many rivers and today forms the basin for major rivers like the Irrawaddy, Chindwin and Sittaung Rivers. The Bago Yoma (Pegu Range) is a prominent but relatively low mountain chain between the Irrawaddy and the Sittaung River in lower-central Myanmar. Many smaller mountain ranges run through the lowlands like the small mountain ranges of Zeebyu Taungdan, Min-wun Taungdan, Hman-kin Taungdan and Gangaw Taungdan. Mount Popa, an extinct volcano and Nat worship holy site, rises prominently from the surrounding lowlands in these lowlands.

=== Western Ranges ===
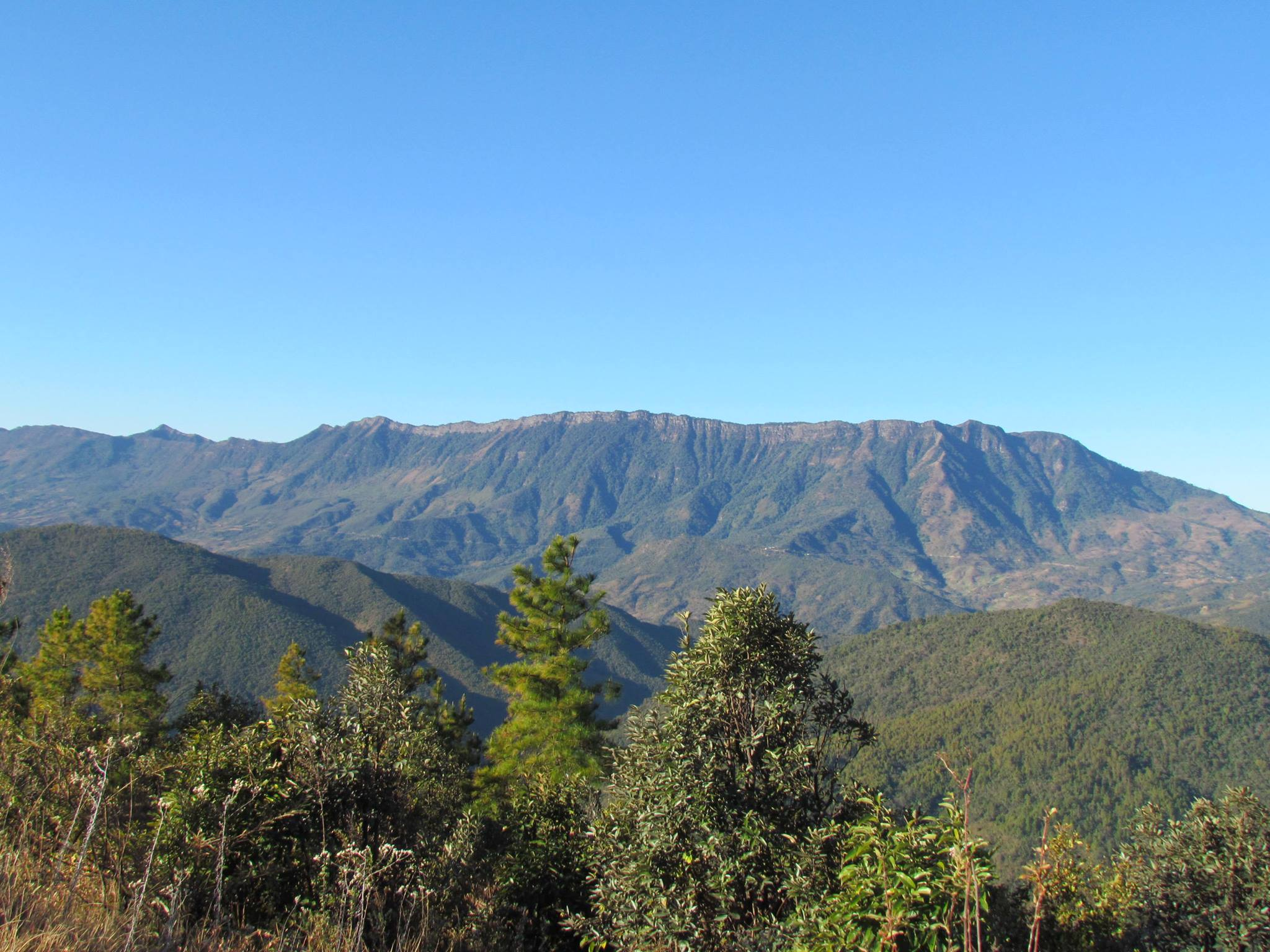
Zinghmuh mountain range in Chin State

The Western Ranges are characterised by the Arakan Mountains running from Manipur into western Myanmar southwards through Rakhine State almost to Cape Negrais in the shores of the Bay of Bengal in Ayeyarwady Region. The mountains reappear as the Andaman and Nicobar Islands further within the Andaman Sea. These mountains are old crystalline rocks separating the Arakan Coast from the rest of the country. The Arakan Range includes the Naga Hills, the Chin Hills, and the Patkai range which includes the Lushai Hills. The Arakan Coast of the Bay of Bengal lays west of these mountains with prominent island archipelagos and coral reefs.

=== Shan Plateau ===
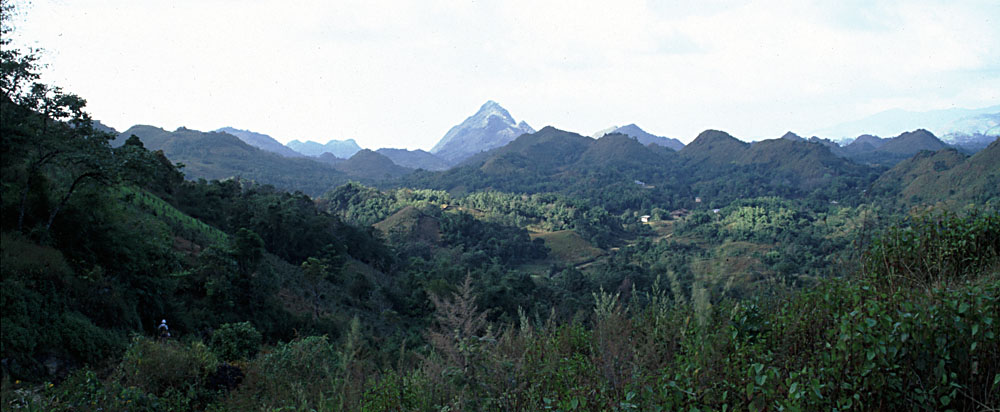
Mountains near Pindaya on the Shan Plateau

In eastern Myanmar, the Shan Plateau rises abruptly from the central lowlands in single steps of some 2,000 feet (610 m). The highest point of the Shan Hills is the 8,400-foot-high (2,600 m) Loi Pangnao, one of the ultra prominent peaks of Southeast Asia. The Shan Hills form, together with the Karen Hills, Dawna Range and Tenasserim Hills, a natural border with Thailand as well as the Kayah–Karen montane rain forests ecoregion which is included in the Global 200 list of ecoregions identified by the World Wildlife Fund (WWF) as priorities for conservation. The plateau was formed during the Mesozoic Era and are a much older feature than the other ranges of Myanmar, creating a series of elevated ranges and valleys. The most notable being the Salween River basin, covering 109,266 square miles (283,000 km^{2}).

=== Southeastern Hills ===
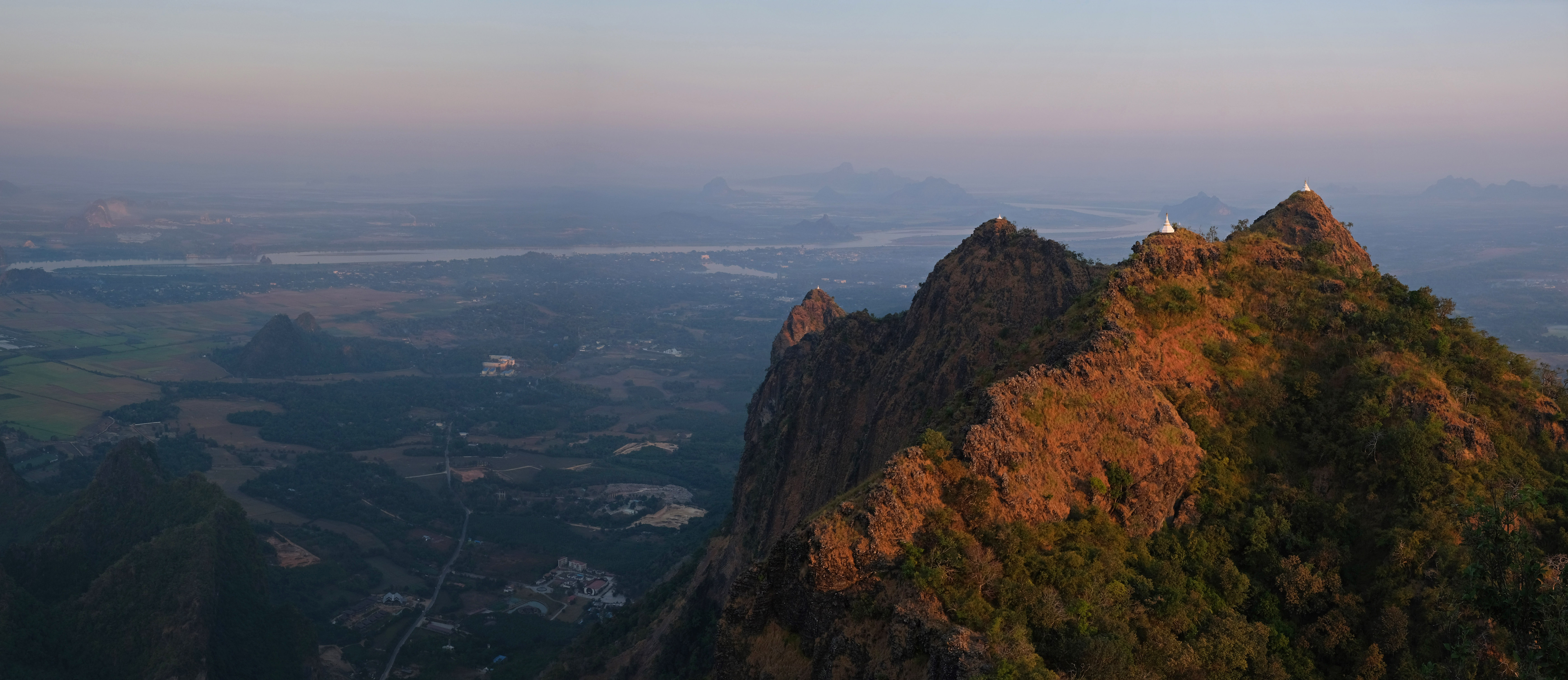
View of Hpa-An from Mount Zwegabin in Southeastern Hills

Myanmar's Southeastern Hills and see the Tenasserim Plains have western shores backed by the Tenasserim Range respectively. The Tenessarim Plains consists largely of the western slopes of the Bilauktaung, the highest part of the Tenasserim Range, which extends southwards forming the central range of the Malay Peninsula. The Dawna Range also stretches along the northern parts of the Tenasserim tail of Myanmar. Many hills in this area, like Mount Zwegabin and Kyaiktiyo, are important cultural and religious sites. The coastal islands rise prominently from the sea and form multiple island archipelago with coral reefs, especially in the Mergui Archipelago.

== Rivers ==
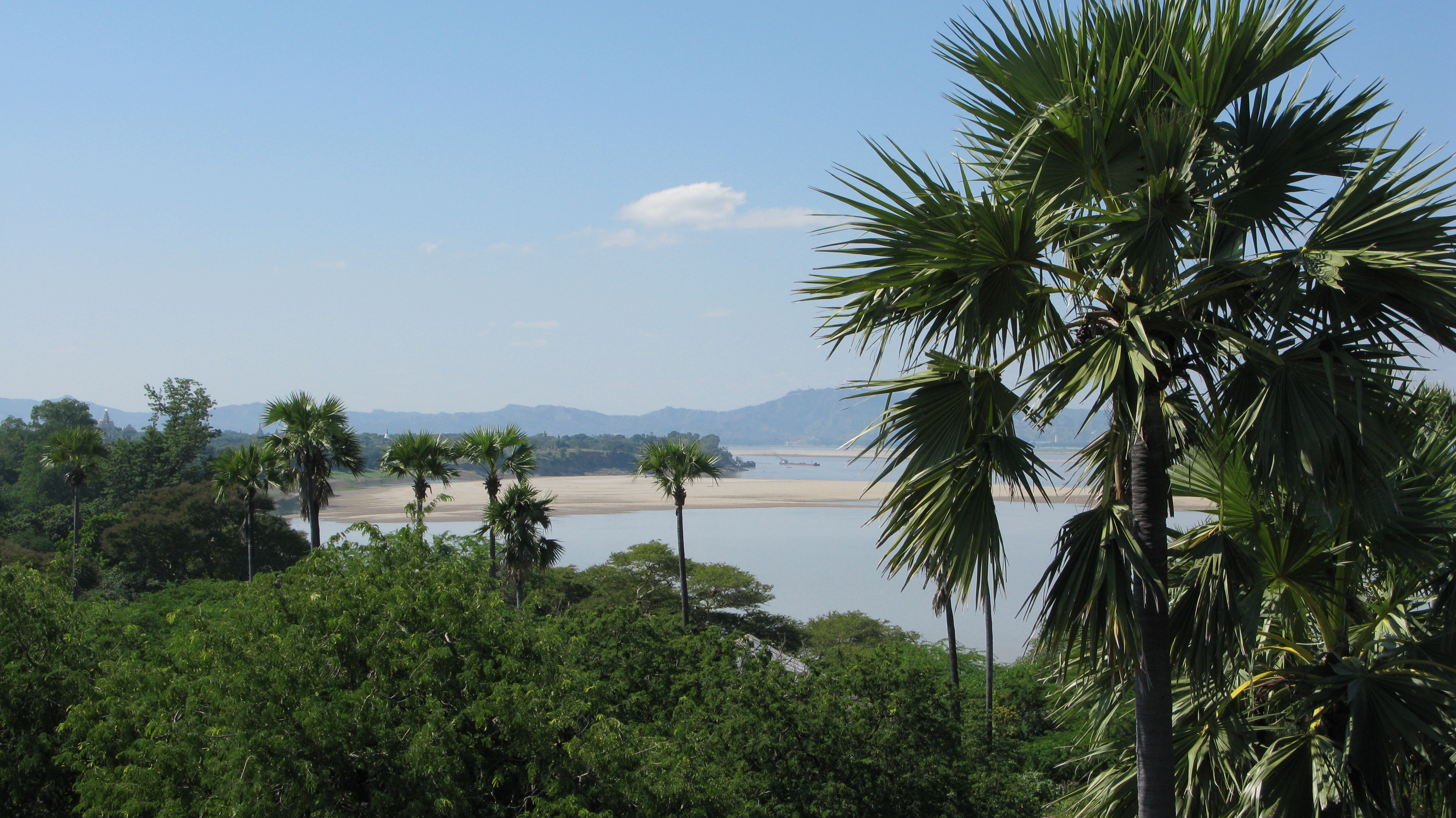
The shores of Irrawaddy River at Nyaung-U, Bagan

The Irrawaddy, the main river of Burma, flows from north to south through the Central Burma Basin and ends in a wide delta. The basin has significant mining resources and forest ecosystems. Its fertile delta also create 60% of annual rice harvests. The river is historically significant with the Bagan temples on their banks and the Kachin people's homeland near the river's source- the confluence of the N'mai and Mali rivers. The Mekong river runs from the Tibetan Plateau through China's Yunnan and northeastern Burma into Laos.

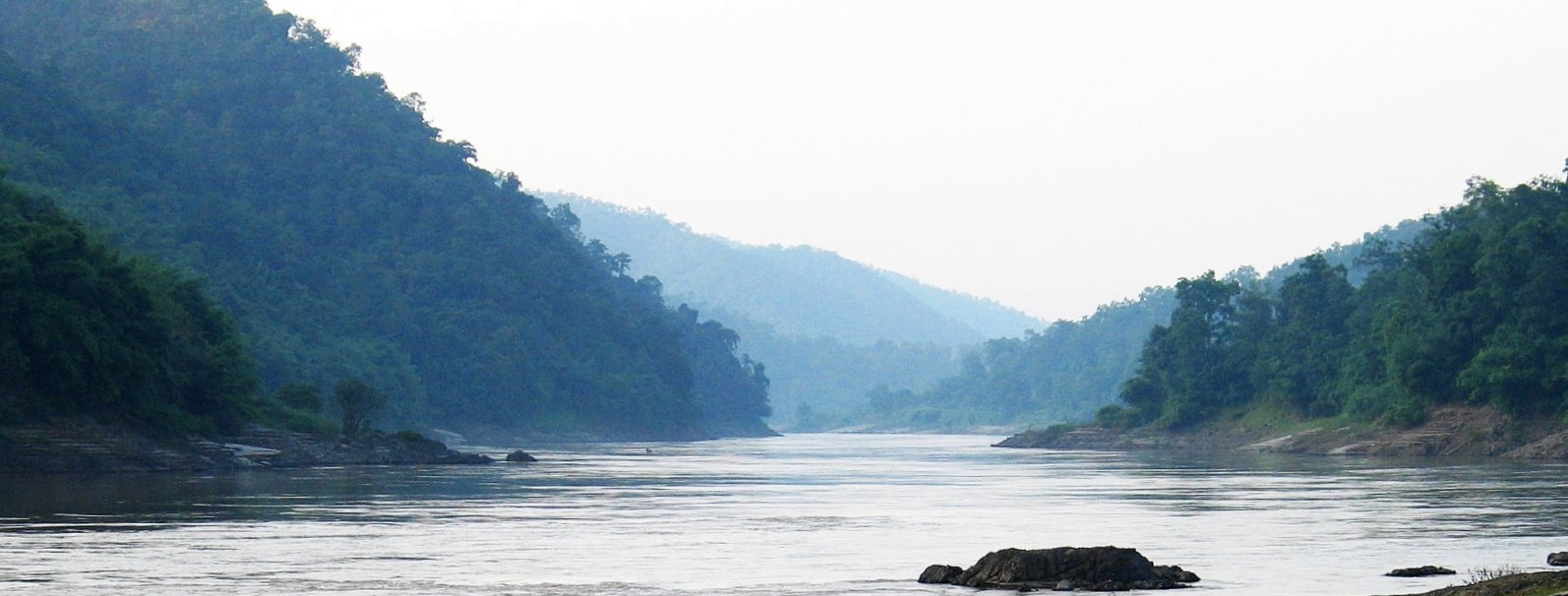
Salween river at Mae Sam Laep on the Thai-Myanmar border

In the east the Salween and the Sittaung River run along the western side of the Shan Hills and the northern end of the Dawna Range. The Salween begins in China, where it is called the Nu River Chinese: 怒江; pinyin: Nù Jiāng, and runs south through 17 degrees of latitude through the Shan Plateau. The Salween runs is called the angry river in Mandarin due to its fast running waters snaking through mountainous terrain for almost the entirety of its 1,491-mile-long (2,400 km) length. In the narrow southeastern part of Burma, the Ye, Heinze, Dawei (Tavoy), Great Tenasserim (Tanintharyi) and the Lenya rivers are relatively short and flow into the Andaman Sea. Further south the Kraburi River forms the southern border between Thailand and Burma.

== Maritime claims ==
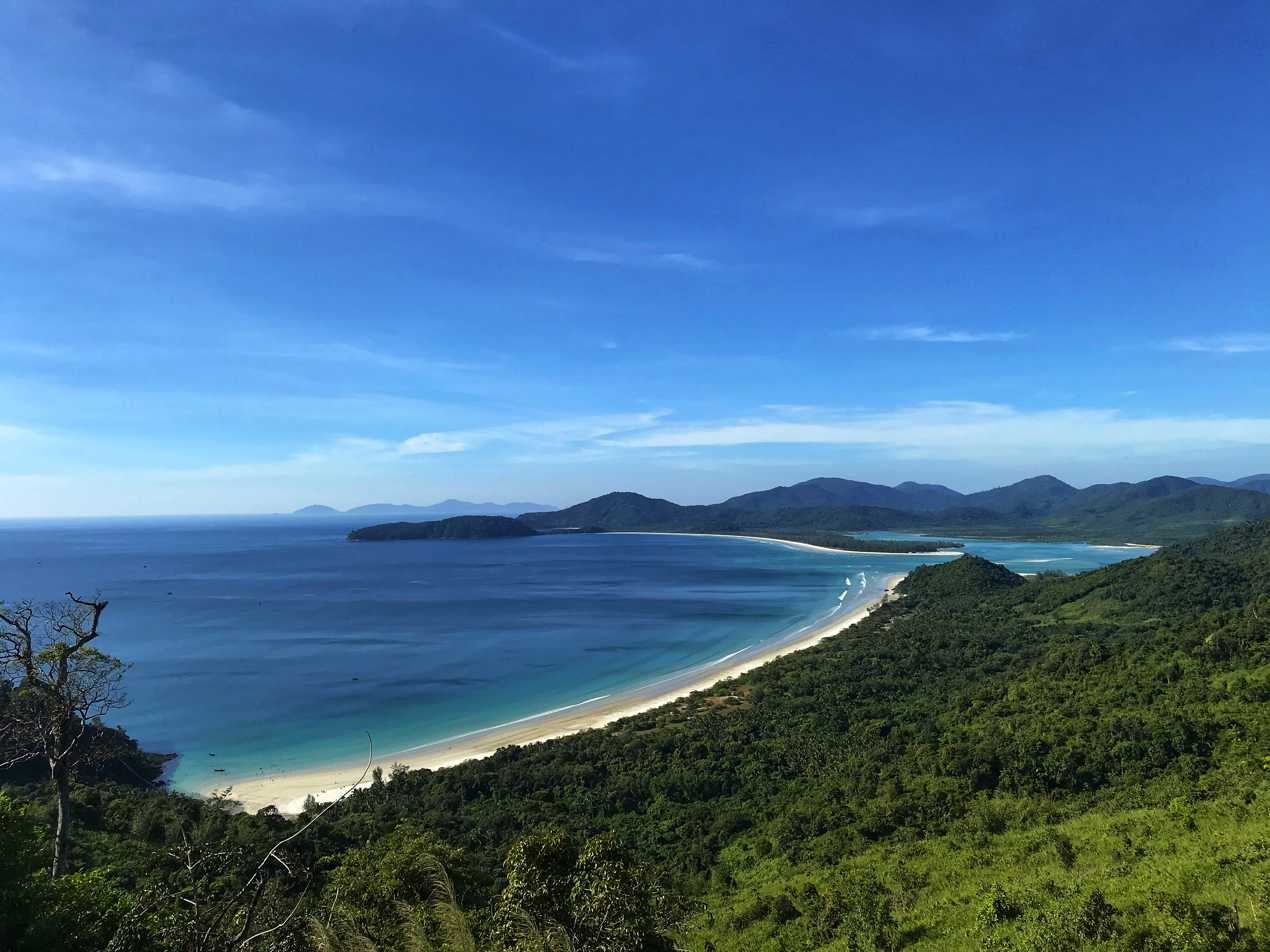
Grandfather Island, Dawei

Myanmar has the 50th-largest exclusive economic zone of 205,706 square miles (532,780 km^{2}). It includes more than 16 islands and the Mergui Archipelago.

Contiguous zone: 24 nautical miles (27.6 mi; 44.4 km)
Continental shelf: 200 nautical miles (230.2 mi; 370.4 km) or to the edge of the continental margin
Exclusive economic zone: 205,706 square miles (532,780 km^{2}), 200 nautical miles (230.2 mi; 370.4 km)

=== Islands ===
- Apaw-ye Kyun
- Calventuras Islands
- Cheduba Island
- Coco Islands
- Kaingthaung Island
- Kalegauk Island
- Kokunye Kyun
- Kyungyi Island
- Moscos Islands
- Myingun Island
- Nantha Kyun
- Preparis
- Ramree Island
- Unguan
- Wa Kyun
- Zalat Taung
- Mergui Archipelago
  - Auriol Island
  - Bentinck Kyun
  - Christie Island, the southernmost island of the archipelago
  - Kadan Kyun, the largest island of the archipelago
  - Lanbi Kyun
  - Letsok-aw Kyun
  - Mali Kyun, the northernmost island of the archipelago
  - Saganthit Kyun
  - Than Kyun
  - Thayawthadangyi
  - Zadetkyi

== Land use and natural resources ==
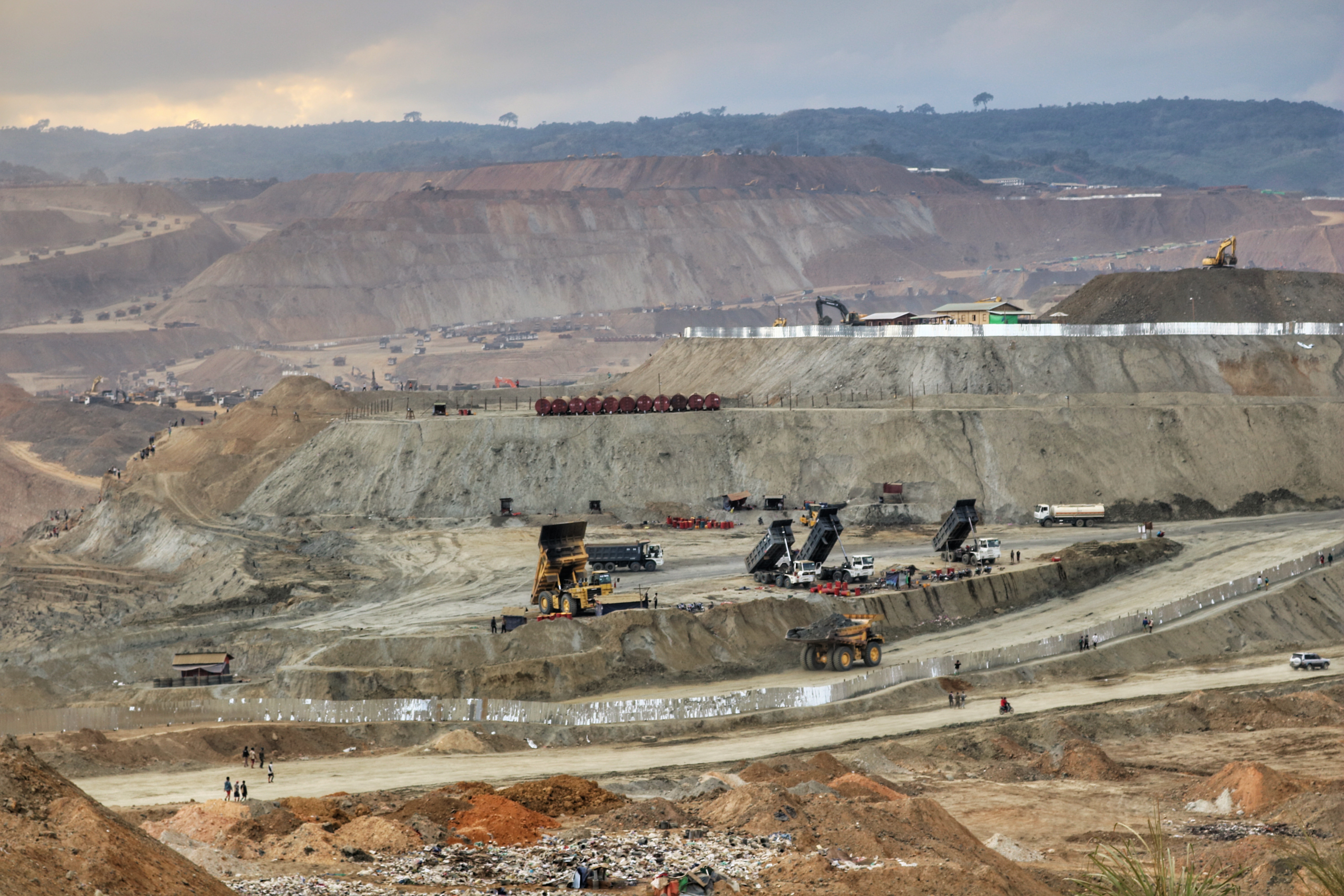
Jade Mine in Hpakant

Arable land	16.56%
Permanent crops	2.25%
Other land	81.20% (2012)
Irrigated land	21,100 mi^{2} (55,000 km^{2}) (2004)
Total renewable water resources	1,168 mi^{3} (4,868 km^{3}) (2011)
Freshwater withdrawal, total (domestic/industrial/agricultural)	33.23 km^{3}/a (7.97 cu mi/a) (10%/1%/89%)
Freshwater withdrawal, per capita	728.6 km^{3}/a (175 cu mi/a) (2005)

Since ancient times, Myanmar has been famous for its abundance of natural resources. The Sanskrit name Suvarnabhumi (သုဝဏ္ဏဘူမိ) has been used in relation to the area in modern-day Lower Burma and Thailand for millennia. Today, major resources include petroleum, natural gas, teak, other timber, tin, antimony, zinc, copper, tungsten, lead, coal, marble, limestone, jade, rubies, sapphire natural gas, and hydropower. Since 2010, Myanmar has had an explosion of foreign direct investment in the extractive sector. New large-scale infrastructure projects like the Kyaukphyu Pipeline and Myitsone Dam have caused controversy within the country, particularly in regard to China's role in the projects.

== Natural hazards ==
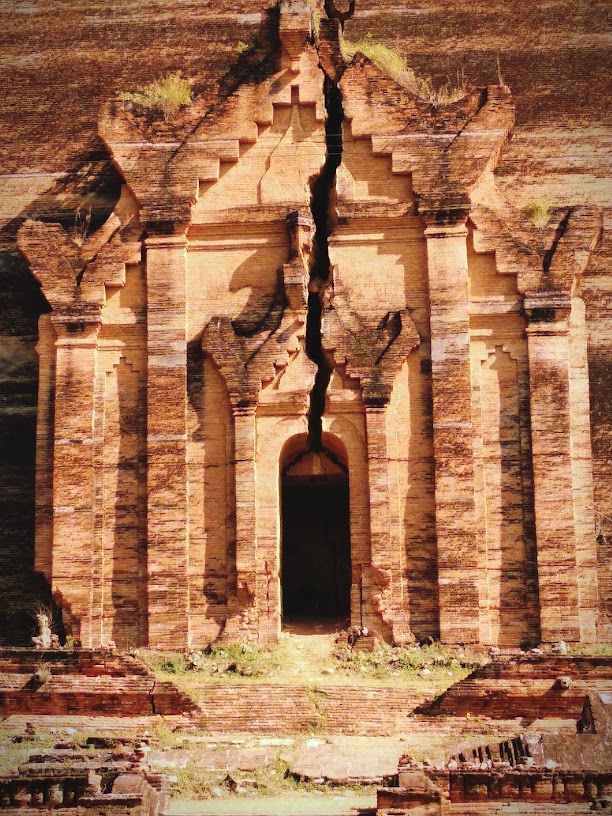
A large fracture on the Mingun Pahtodawgyi caused by the 1839 Ava earthquake.

Natural hazards include destructive earthquakes and cyclones. Flooding and landslides are common during the rainy season from June to September. Periodic droughts also occur.

=== Earthquakes ===
Myanmar lies at the confluence of the Indian Plate, Eurasian Plate and the Burma microplate. Both the Indian-Eurasian subduction zone and the Indian-Burma plate boundaries are frequent hypocentres for earthquakes. The continental right-lateral transform Sagaing Fault runs north-south through the middle of the country. It is responsible for many damaging earthquakes through the country's history like the 1839 Ava earthquake. Many earthquakes with a 6-8 magnitude caused damage in the country. For example the 1881 Nicobar Islands earthquake, 1941 Andaman Islands earthquake, and the 2004 Indian Ocean earthquake, and 2025 Myanmar earthquake.

=== Cyclones ===
Myanmar is also hit by a powerful cyclone roughly every two years. The highest frequency of severe cyclones occur during November and May. The past century of cyclogenesis data in the North Indian Ocean has seen a significant increase in cyclone formation during these two months. The most damaging cyclone that hit Myanmar was the Cyclone Nargis in April–May 2008; with ongoing climate change, oceans will become warmer, which may lead to cyclones becoming more intense and devastating for Myanmar.

== Environment ==
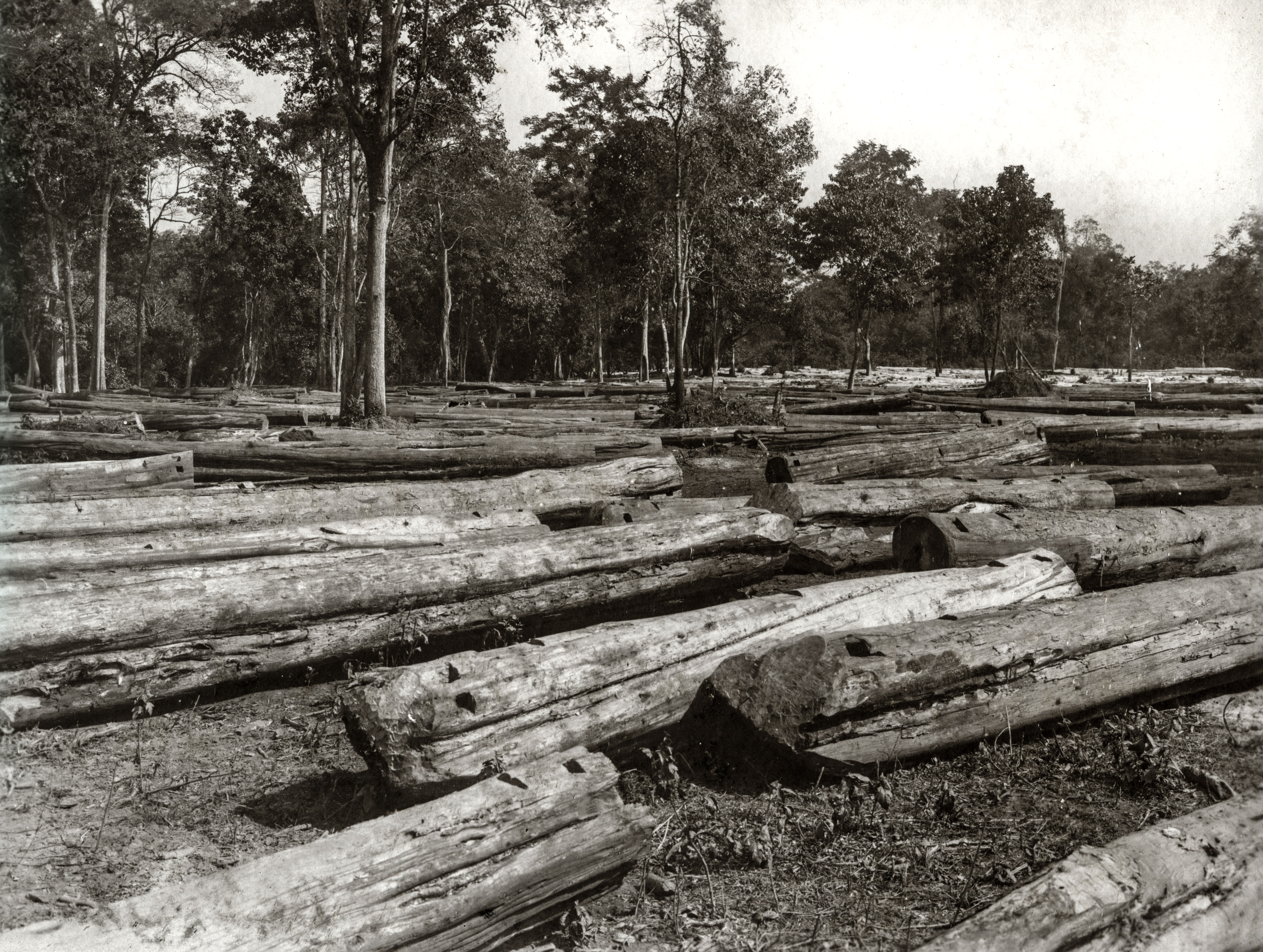
Deforestation in Myanmar during the British colonial era.

Environmental issues include deforestation; industrial pollution of air, soil, and water; inadequate sanitation and water treatment that contributes to disease. Climate change is also projected to have major impacts on Myanmar, such as increasing the prevalence and intensity of drought and extreme weather.

An IUCN Red List of Ecosystems Assessment was conducted for Myanmar in 2020 that assessed 64 terrestrial ecosystem types across 10 biomes. Of these 64 ecosystem types, 1 was confirmed as collapsed, 8 were considered Critically Endangered, 9 were considered Endangered, 12 were considered Vulnerable, 3 were considered Near Threatened, 14 were considered of Least Concern, and 17 were deemed Data Deficient. The 64 terrestrial ecosystem types included five brackish tidal systems, one dry subterranean system, one lake, five palustrine wetlands, four polar/alpine systems, twelve savannahs and grasslands, two shoreline systems, two supralittoral coastal systems, seven temperate-boreal forests and woodlands, and twenty five tropical and subtropical forests.

A recent global remote sensing analysis suggested that there were 1,280 square miles (3,300 km^{2}) of tidal flats in Myanmar, making it the 8th ranked country in terms of tidal flat area.

=== Environment – international agreements ===
party to: Biodiversity, Desertification, Endangered Species, Law of the Sea, Nuclear Test Ban, Ozone Layer Protection, Ship Pollution, Tropical Timber 83, Tropical Timber 94

== See also ==
- List of rivers of Myanmar
- Geology of Myanmar
- List of volcanoes in Myanmar
- List of ecoregions in Myanmar
- Zomia (geography)
