= Mon State =

Administrative division of Myanmar

Mon State မွန်ပြည်နယ် (Burmese) တွဵုရးဍုၚ်မန် (Mon)
- State

Other transcription(s)
  - Burmese: mwan pranynai
  - Mon: Tweuraḥ ḍuṅ Mon
- Flag Seal

- Country: Myanmar
- Region: Lower
- Before becoming State: Tenasserim Division No (1)
- Renamed as Mon State: 3 January 1974
- Capital: Mawlamyine

Government
  - Chief Minister: Aung Win Than
  - Cabinet: Mon State Government
  - Legislature: Mon State Hluttaw
  - Judiciary: Mon State High Court

Area
  - Total: 12,296.6 km^{2} (4,747.7 sq mi)
  - Rank: 12th
- Highest elevation (Sedaung Taung): 1,294 m (4,245 ft)

Population (2014 Census)
  - Total: 2,054,393
  - Rank: 9th
  - Density: 167.070/km^{2} (432.709/sq mi)
- Demonym: Mons

Demographics
  - Ethnicities: Mon, Bamar, Anglo-Burmese, Chin, Kachin, Kayin, Rakhine, Shan, Burmese-Thai, Burmese Indians, Pa'O
  - Religions: Buddhism, Christianity, Islam, Hinduism
- Time zone: UTC+06:30 (MMT)
- HDI (2021): 0.610 medium · 4th
- Website: www.monstate.gov.mm

Mon State (Burmese: မွန်ပြည်နယ်, pronounced [mʊ̀ɴ pjìnɛ̀]; Mon: တွဵုရးဍုင်မန်) is an administrative division of Myanmar. It lies between Kayin State to the east, the Andaman Sea to the west, Bago Region to the north and Tanintharyi Region to the south, also having a short border with Thailand's Kanchanaburi Province at its south-eastern tip. The land area is 12,155 km^{2} (4,693 sq mi). The Dawna Range, running along the eastern side of the state in a NNW–SSE direction, forms a natural border with Kayin State. Mon State includes some small islands, such as Kalegauk, Wa Kyun and Kyungyi Island, along its 566 km (352 mi) of coastline. The state's capital is Mawlamyine.

== History ==
Mon tradition holds that the Suwarnabhumi (pronounced Suvanna Bhoum) mentioned in the Edicts of Ashoka and the Dîpavamsa was their first kingdom, founded around the port of Thaton in about 300 BC; however, this is disputed by scholars.

Oral tradition suggests that they had contact with Buddhism via commercial and cultural contacts with the Indian subcontinent as early as the 3rd century BCE, though definitely by the 2nd century BCE when they received an envoy of monks from Ashoka. The Mon converted to Theravada Buddhism sometime before the sixth century, and they adopted the Indian Pallava script. Much of the Mon's written records have been destroyed through wars. The Mons blended Indian and Mon cultures in a hybrid of the civilisations. By 825, they had firmly established themselves in southern and southeastern Myanmar and founded the cities of Bago (Pegu) and Thaton. By the mid-9th century, they had come to dominate all of southern Myanmar.

=== Mon kingdoms ===
The earliest recorded kingdom widely attributed to the Mon was Dvaravati, which flourished until approximately 1024 AD, when its capital came under the rule of the Khmer Empire. Most of the inhabitants fled west to present-day Myanmar and established new kingdoms. These, too, came under pressure from new ethnic groups arriving from the north, such as the Tai peoples. Despite these challenges, the Mon contributed significantly to the spread of Theravada Buddhism and left a lasting influence on the region's cultural and religious development.

=== Advent of the British ===
Lower Burma, including what is now Mon State, was conquered by Great Britain in 1824 after the First Anglo-Burmese War. The Mon assisted the British in the war, in return for promises of their own leadership after the defeat of Burma. Hundreds of thousands of Mons who had migrated into Siam returned to their homeland when it came under British rule. However, British promises to restore the Mon Kingdom were never fulfilled. During colonial times, Moulmein (Mawlamyine) had a substantial Anglo-Burmese population; an area of the city was known as 'Little England' due to the large Anglo-Burmese community. Nowadays this community has dwindled to a handful of families as most have left for the UK or Australia.

=== Burmese independence ===
In 1947, the Mon sought self-determination from the yet unformed Union of Burma. Burmese Prime Minister U Nu refused, saying that no separate national rights for the Mon should be contemplated. The Burmese army moved into areas claimed by the Mon nationalists and imposed rule by force, which resulted in a civil war. Mon separatists formed the Mon Peoples Front, which was later superseded by the New Mon State Party (NMSP) in 1962. Since 1949, the eastern hills of the state (as well as portions of Thaninthaya Division) have been under control of the NMSP and its military arm, the Mon National Liberation Front (MNLF). In addition to fighting the central government, the MNLF has fought the Karen people over control of lucrative border crossings into Thailand.

In 1974, partially to assuage Mon separatist demands, the theoretically autonomous Mon State was created out of portions of Thaninthayi Division and Bago Division. Resistance continued until 1995, when NMSP and SLORC agreed a cease-fire. In 1996, the Mon Unity League was founded. SLORC troops continued to operate in defiance of the agreement.

== Government ==
=== Executive ===
Mon State Government

=== Judiciary ===
Mon State High Court

== Demographics ==
Historical population
Year	Pop.	±%
1973	1,314,224	—
1983	1,680,157	+27.8%
2014	2,054,393	+22.3%
Source: 2014 Myanmar Census

The population was 2,054,393 according to 2014 Census.

=== Ethnic makeup ===
Ethnic composition of Mon State
Ethnic group	Percentage
Mon	38.7%
Bamar	36.4%
Karen	14.2%
Other	7.4%
Pa-O	3.1%
Shan	0.2%
Source: 2019 GAD township reports

The Mon make up a slight plurality of Mon State's population. However, there are significant Bamar and Kayin minorities, and smaller communities, including the Pa-O and Anglo-Burmese. Many are isolated and many do not understand or speak Burmese. There is a Thai community in Kyaikkami.

After the 2014 Census in Myanmar, the Burmese government indefinitely withheld release of detailed ethnicity data, citing concerns around political and social concerns surrounding the issue of ethnicity in Myanmar. In 2022, researchers published an analysis of the General Administration Department's nationwide 2018–2019 township reports to tabulate the ethnic makeup of Mon State.

=== Religion ===
Religion in Mon (2014)
1. Buddhism (92.6%)
2. Islam (5.80%)
3. Hinduism (1.00%)
4. Christianity (0.50%)
5. Other religion (0.10%)

According to the 2014 Myanmar Census, Buddhists make up 92.6% of Mon State's population, forming the largest religious community there. Minority religious communities include Christians (0.5%), Muslims (5.8%), and Hindus (1%) who collectively comprise the remainder of Mon State's population. 0.1% of the population listed no religion, other religions, or were otherwise not enumerated.

According to the State Sangha Maha Nayaka Committee's 2016 statistics, 32,769 Buddhist monks were registered in Mon State, comprising 6.1% of Myanmar's total Sangha membership, which includes both novice samanera and fully-ordained bhikkhu. The majority of monks belong to the Thudhamma Nikaya (79.8%), followed by Shwegyin Nikaya (14.9%), with the remainder of monks belonging to other small monastic orders. 3,550 thilashin were registered in Mon State, comprising 5.9% of Myanmar's total thilashin community.

== Geography ==
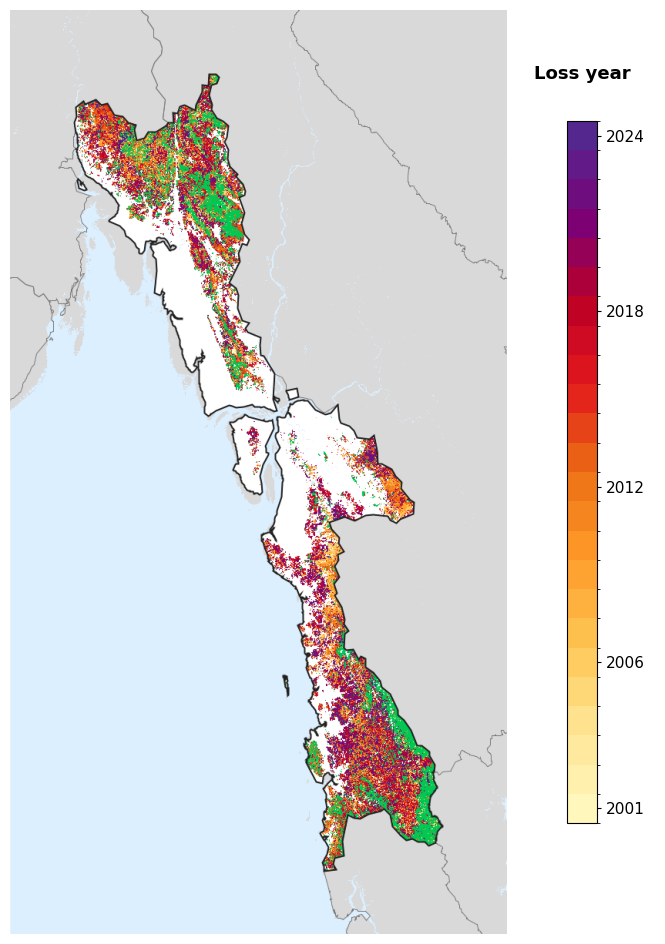
Tree-cover loss year in Mon State, 2001-2024, from the Global Forest Change dataset.

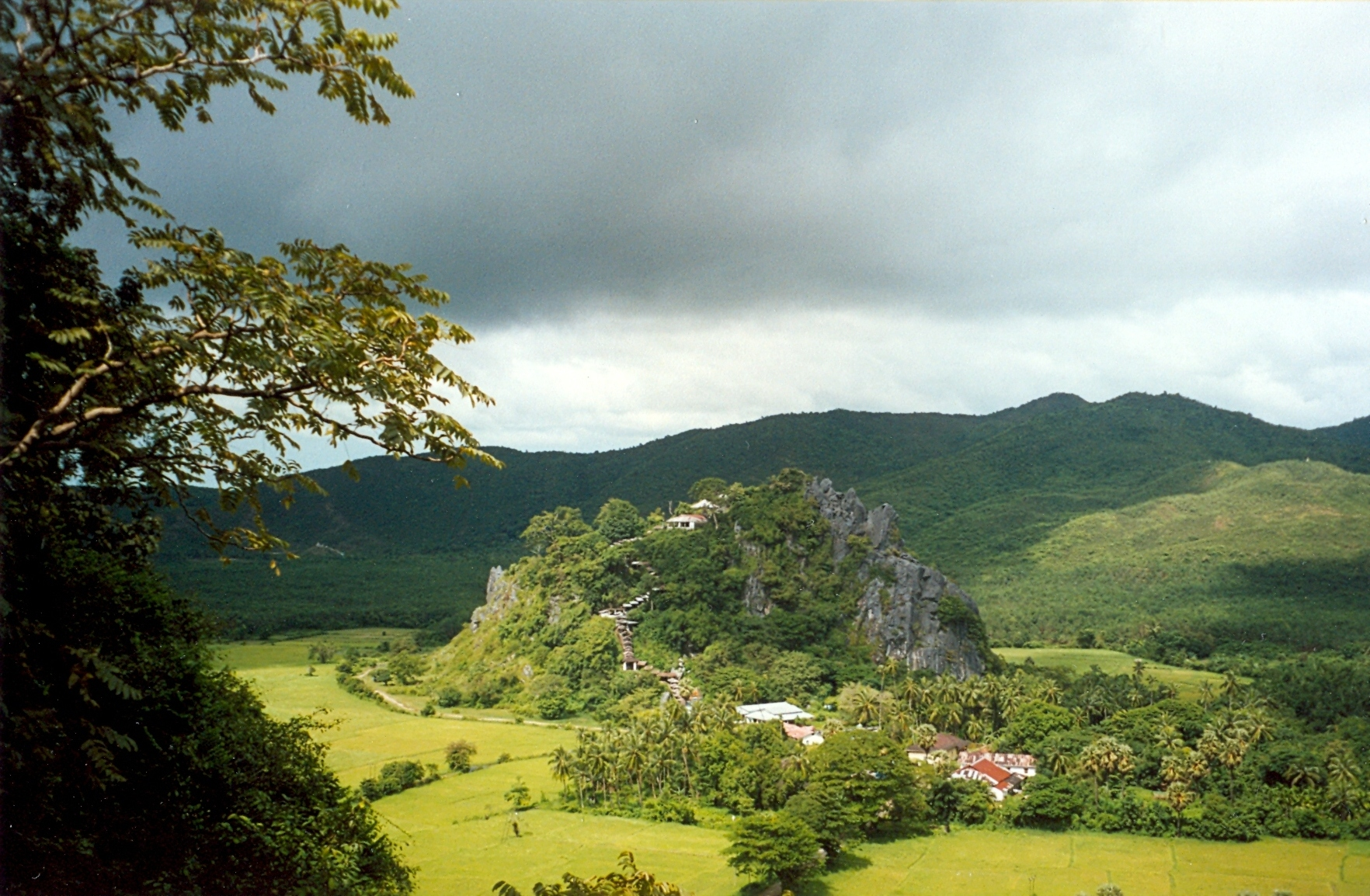
Limestone landscape near Mudon, south of Mawlamyaing.

Bordering Bago Division in the south of Sittaung River Mouth, Kayin State in the east, Thailand and Taninthayi Division in the south and Andaman Sea and Gulf of Mottama in the West, Mon state is situated between latitudes 14°52′ north and 17°32′ north and longitudes 96°51′ east and 98°13′ east.

=== Climate and weather ===
Mon State has a tropical climate. It has temperate weather as it is located in the low latitude zone and near the sea. The state has only slight changes in temperature. The average temperature of Mawlamyine in January is 78 °F (26 °C) and in April is 85 °F (29 °C). Annual rainfall in Mawlamyine is 190 inches (4.8 m) and in Thaton is 217 inches (5.5 m). Rain is especially heavy in July and August.

== Economy ==
Mon State has a cultivated area of nearly 4,500,000 acres (1,800,000 ha), with most of the land dedicated to growing rice. The primary secondary crop is rubber. Orchards and rubber plantations are typically found in the mountainous regions, while coastal areas in the south, particularly in Ye District, support fishing and related industries such as the production of dried fish, fish sauce, and agar-agar.

Production of betel nut is also a traditional and ongoing livelihood in Mon State. Many Mon farmers have preserved their hereditary land rights in accordance with government regulations. However, there are still significant areas of uncultivated land, especially near the border with Karen State.

In recent years, modern agricultural ventures have included the cultivation of cashew trees (known as *acajoú* in Portuguese), with the nuts being harvested for sale in other regions.

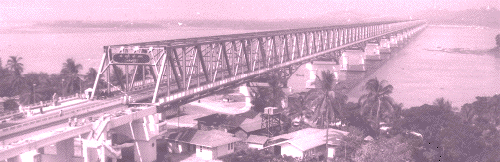
Opened in 2006, the Mawlamyine Bridge allows north–south travel for trains, vehicles, and pedestrians.

Other industries in the state include the production of paper, sugar, and rubber tires. Thaton is home to a major rubber products factory (in Burmese, Ka-Sa-La), operated by the Ministry of Industry (1). Forests cover approximately half of Mon State, making timber production a key economic contributor. Mineral resources extracted in the state include salt, antimony, and granite.

While natural resources such as timber and mineral deposits (both onshore and offshore) are abundant, they are largely exploited by senior military officials and foreign corporations. One of the largest sources of foreign direct investment (FDI) in Myanmar is the exploitation of natural gas reserves in Mon State. The Yadana Gas Project, which includes a pipeline running through several towns in the state, has brought environmental and social concerns, particularly for the Mon people and their ancestral lands.

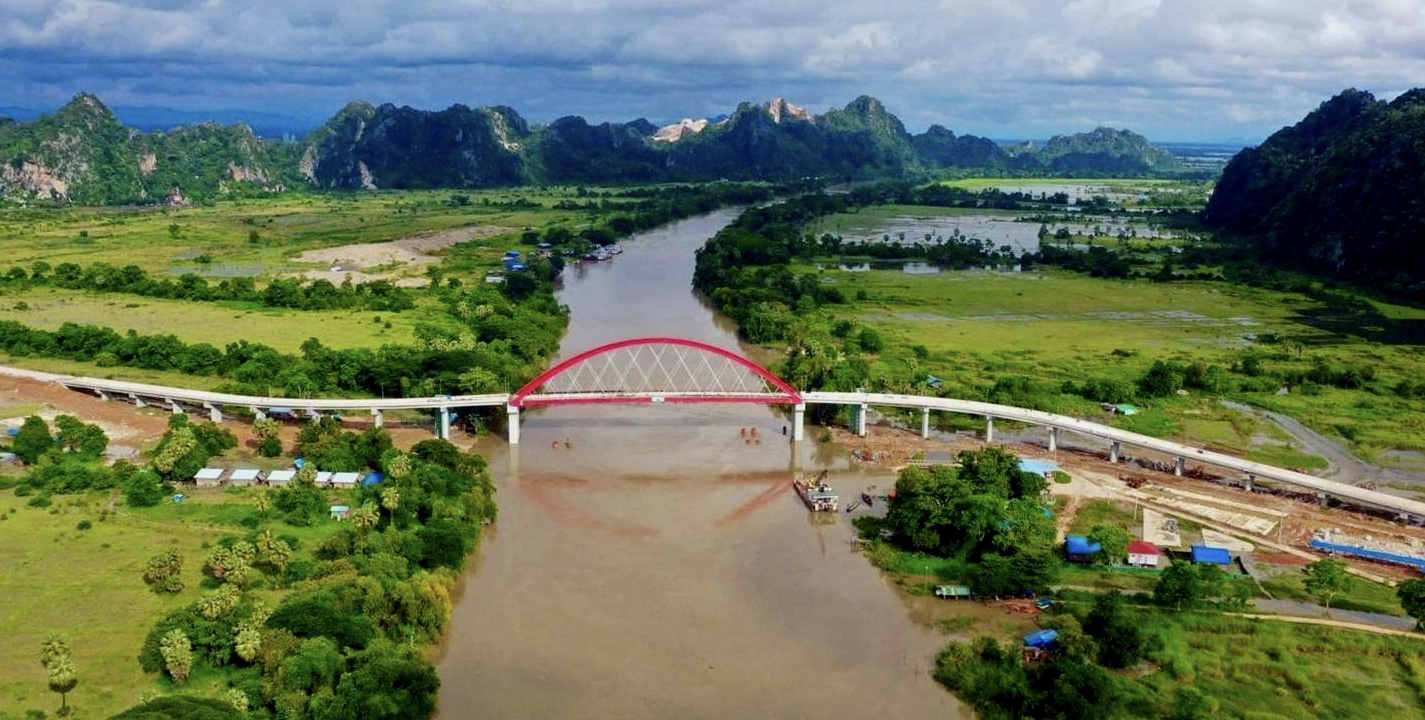
Attran Bridge (Sabei Gu) near Kyaikmaraw, Mon State

An applied agricultural research center is located in Mudon, a town near Mawlamyine. This center conducts laboratory-based research, particularly in rubber cultivation and fertilization of various plant species.

The state's future prospects in tourism are promising, thanks to strong transportation links to Yangon. Travel options include train, bus, sea routes, and airlines. The recently opened Mawlamyine Bridge significantly improves travel times between southern Mon State (such as Ye) and northern cities like Bago and Yangon, making day trips feasible. The Three Pagodas Pass also serves as an alternative international route, connecting Mon State with Kanchanaburi province in Thailand.

According to the Mon State Directorate of Investment and Company Administration, the total foreign direct investment in Mon State from 1994 to 2016 exceeded US$5.433 billion.

== Transport ==
- Ye Airport
- Mawlamyine Airport

== Administrative divisions ==
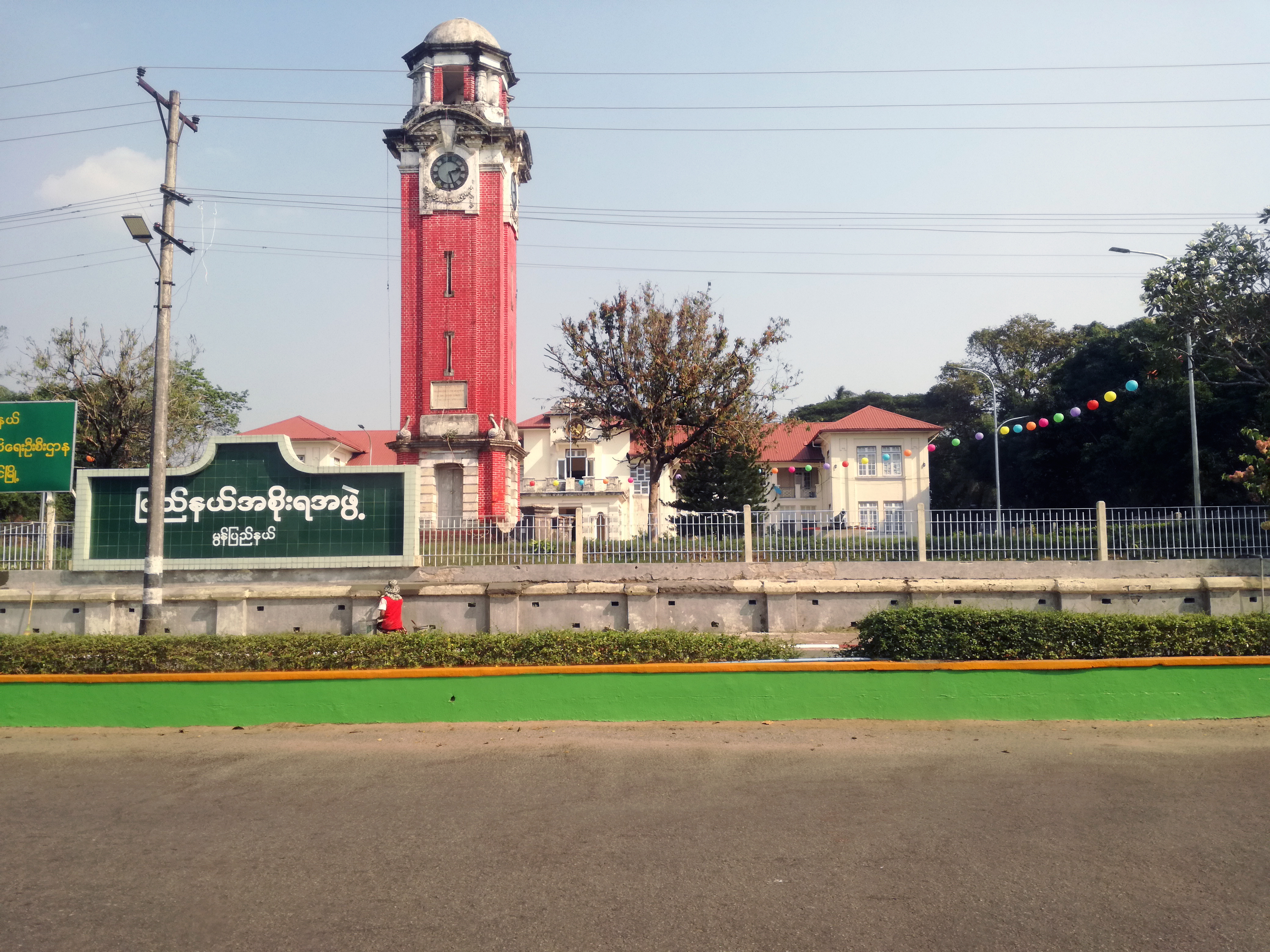
Mon State Government Office

Mon State's capital is Mawlamyine; it is the fourth largest city in Myanmar. It was formerly known as Moulmein under the British colonial rule till the late 1980s. Administrative body is set under South Eastern Regional Command of Myanmar Army in Mawlamyine and Mawyawaddy Navy Command controls coastline security. There are dispersed army infantry battalions at many towns in Mon state, and Thaton has a Light Infantry Division (44th). Major districts in Mon State are divided for example, Mawlamyine, Thaton, Ye and Kyaikto districts. At present, army infantries are densely placed in the former neutral territory of Ye district for future plans. Ye has become the major city for Southern Mon State with Sector Operation Command of Air Defense, and Military Operations Command 19 based headquarters.

Mon State consists of two districts:

2 districts of Mon

- Mawlamyine District (မော်လမြိုင်ခရိုင်)
- Thaton District (သထုံခရိုင်)

=== Cities and towns and villages ===
Cities with large district	Towns	Villages
Mawlamyine	Mudon	Kawt-bane
Thaton	Paung	Kamawak
Thanbyuzayat	Bilin	Pha-auk
Ye	Mottama	Pa-nga
Kyaikmaraw	Kyaik-kami	Jain-gyike
Kyaikhto	Sit-taung	Thein-sake
Bakwai	Lamine	Mawkanin
Chaungzon	Kamarwatt	Ywar Lut

Islands
Belu-kyun
Kalar-goke island

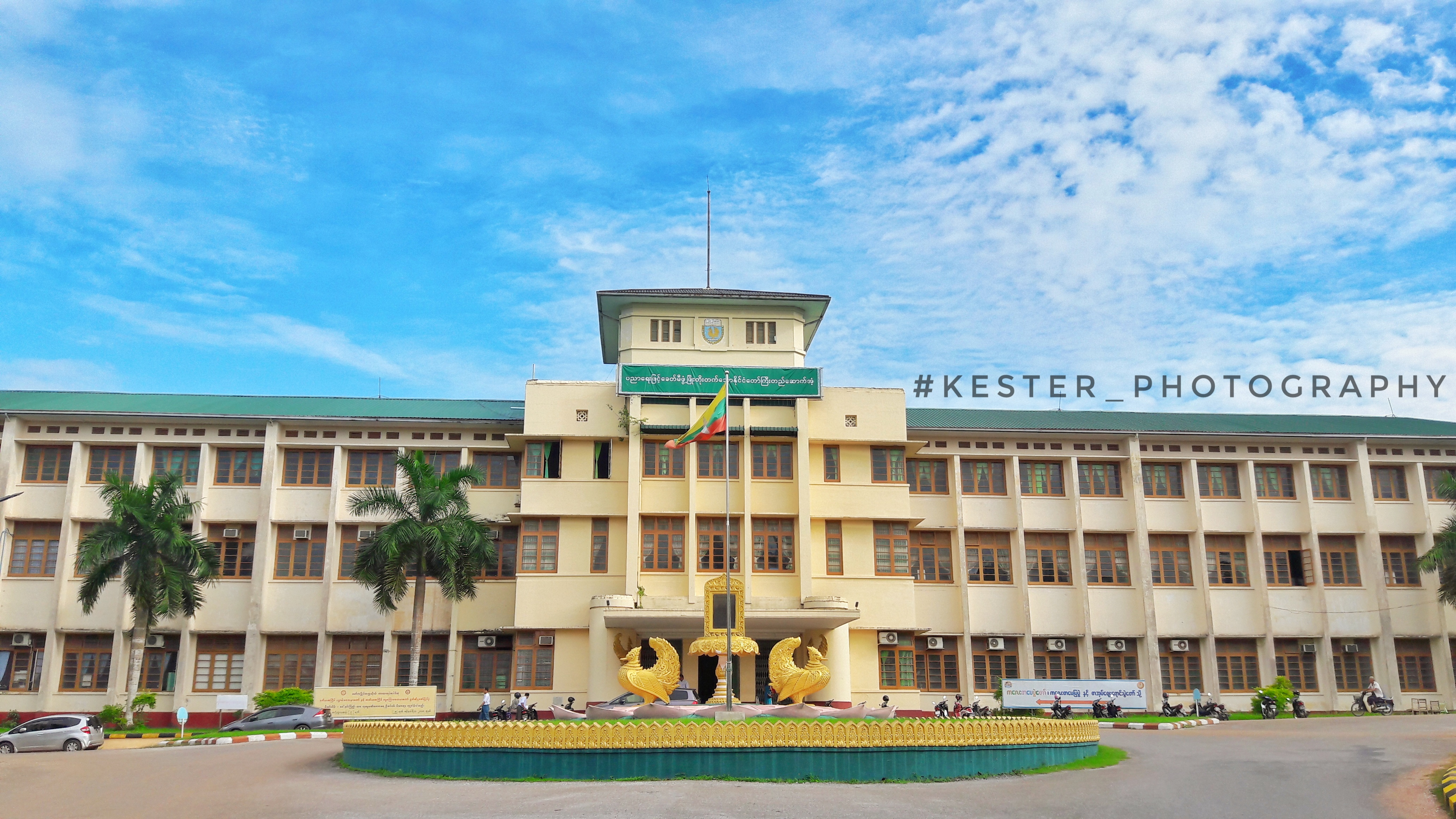
Mawlamyine University, Mon State

== Education ==
The following is a summary of the public school system in the state in the academic year 2002–2003.

AY 2002–2003	Primary	Middle	High
Schools	1210	87	56
Teachers	6200	3200	900
Students	222,000	81,000	26,000

Almost all institutions of higher education in the state are located in Mawlamyine. Mawlamyine University is the main university and the largest university in the state.

== Health care ==
The general state of health care in Myanmar is poor. Although health care is nominally free, in reality, patients have to pay for medicine and treatment, even in public clinics and hospitals. Public hospitals have limited number of basic facilities and equipment. The following is a summary of the public health system in the state, in the fiscal year 2002–2003.

2002–2003	# Hospitals	# Beds
Specialist hospitals	–	–
General hospitals with specialist services	1	350
General hospitals	10	341
Health clinics	14	224
Total	25	915

== Notable sites ==
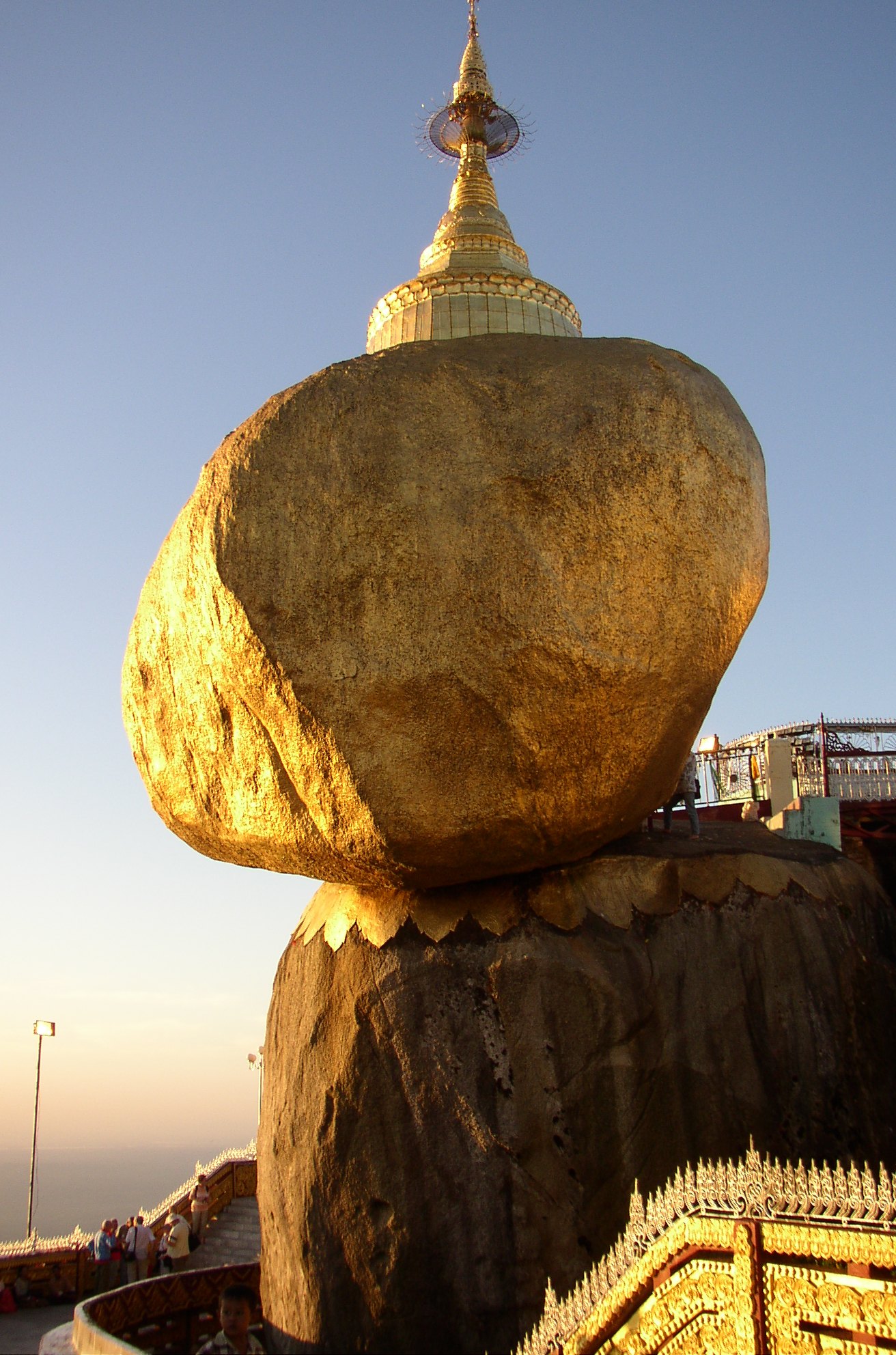
Kyaiktiyo Pagoda sits at an elevation of 3,615 ft (1,102 m)

- Kyaiktiyo Pagoda: A famous religious site with a steeple built on a rock covered with gold leaf, precariously balanced on the site of a cliff.
- Kyaikhtisaung Pagoda: A famous pagoda said to hold a hair of the Gautama Buddha.
- Kaylartha Pagoda: A famous pagoda on Kaylartha Mountain where the Buddha is said to have landed.
- Thaton: Thaton was the capital of the Thaton Kingdom, which ruled present-day Lower Burma between the 9th and 11th centuries.
- Mudon Kangyi Pagoda: It lies on the hill west of the vast lake east of Mudon.
- Win Sein Tawya with the world's largest reclining Buddha at Mudon.
- Thanbyuzayat War Cemetery & Death Railway Museum
- Setse Beach & Kyaik-kami
- Kyaikmaraw Paya: A huge Buddha image built in AD 1455 by Queen Shin Saw Pu, the only female ruler in the history of Myanmar.
- Belu-kyun (Bilu island): It is located opposite to Mawlamyine, and is famous for traditional handmade products.
- Zinkyaik Pagoda: An ancient pagoda on top of Zinkyaik Mountain and former home of Hermits Tissa and Thiha

== See also ==
- Mon State Cultural Museum
- Ramannadesa
