= Ye River =

Coordinates: 15°15′N 97°51′E

Location
- Country: Burma

Physical characteristics
- Source: Tenasserim Hills
- Mouth: Andaman Sea
  - location: Off the Mon State coast

The Ye River is a river of Burma. It has its source in the Tenasserim Hills and drains into the Andaman Sea along the Mon State coast. Wa Kyun is an island located 3 kilometres west-northwest of the mouth of the Ye River. The Ye River flows through the eastern part of the town of Ye town.

== See also ==
- List of rivers of Myanmar
