= Deforestation in Myanmar =

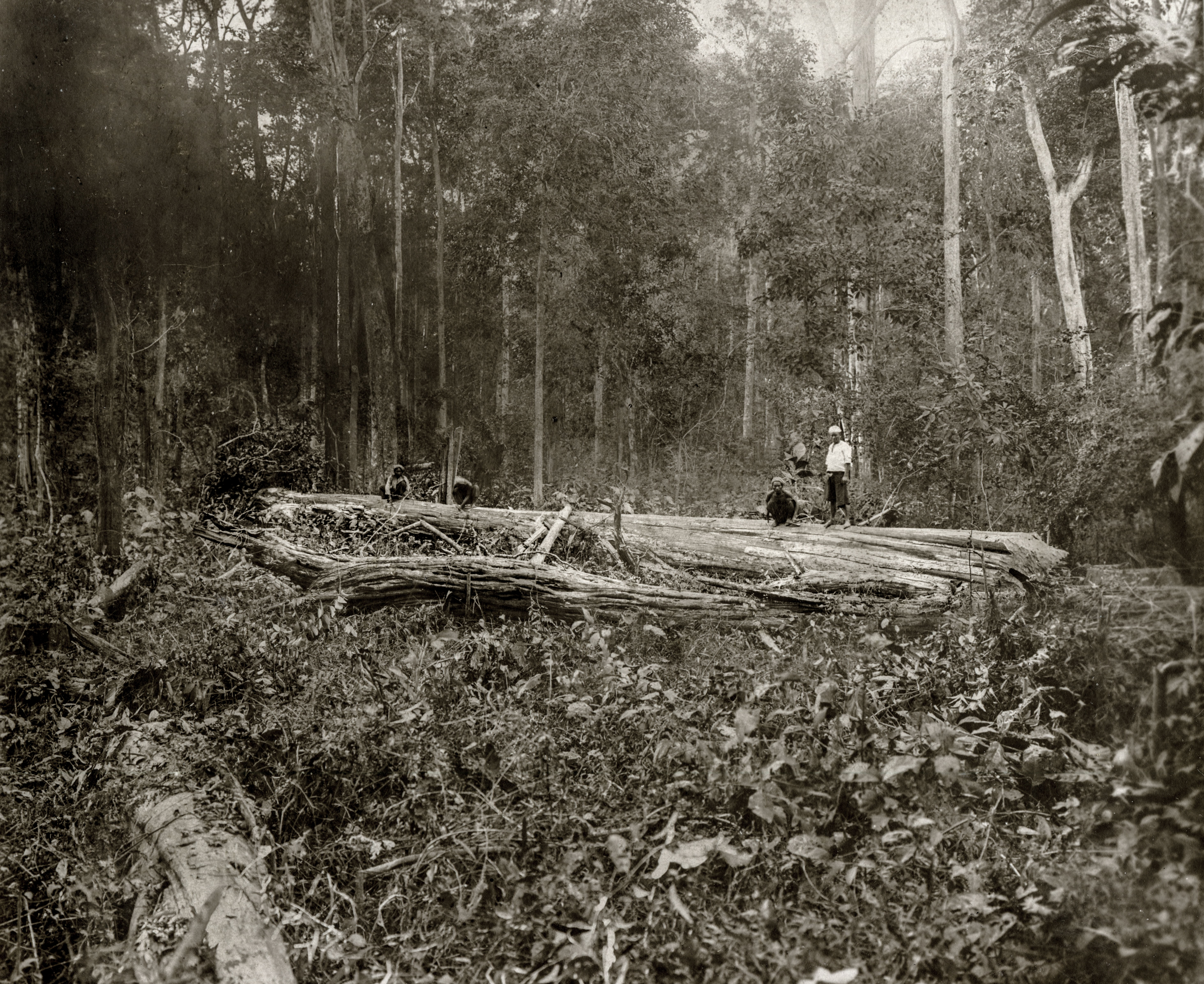
Black and white photograph of logging in Myanmar taken by a Bombay Burmah Trading Corporation official during British rule.

Deforestation in Myanmar (otherwise known as Burma) led to a reduction in forest cover from 70% of the country in 1948 to 48% by 2014. Myanmar possesses the largest expanse of tropical forest in mainland Southeast Asia, which contains high biodiversity. As of 2010, Myanmar's living forest biomass held 1,654 million metric tons of carbon and over 80 endemic species.

Under British rule, Myanmar's forests were logged for timber on an industrial scale for the first time. After independence, commercial logging greatly expanded under the military government of Ne Win. According to a report by the Food and Agriculture Organization, Myanmar lost 19%, or 7,445,000 hectares (28,750 sq mi), of its forest between 1990 and 2010. In the 21st century, contributing factors to deforestation in Myanmar include continued timber extraction, illegal logging, agricultural expansion, land disputes and civil conflict. Deforestation has increased amidst the escalation of civil war following the 2021 coup d'état.

== History ==
=== Colonial era ===
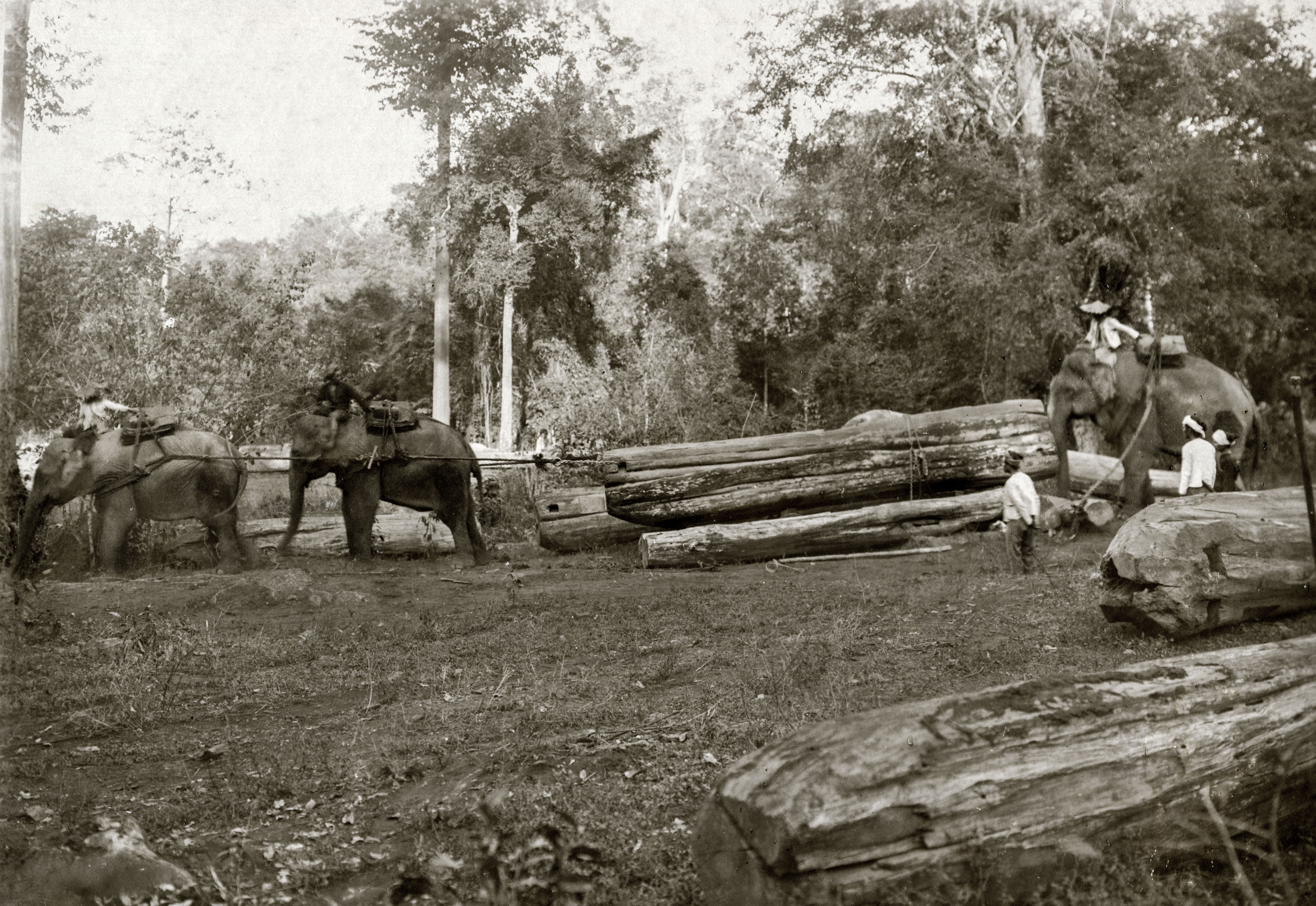
A work elephant moving logs during the colonial era.

Although the traditional agricultural practice of swiddening has been practised in Burma for thousands of years, there are no signs that it led to significant deforestation and may in fact have helped maintain the forests. Significant deforestation in Burma began in the 1800s during the colonial era as the British cut down large expanses of forest for timber, a resource in high demand for their empire. Hardwoods were very important to the British for shipbuilding, especially teak which was valued for its durability and water resistant properties.

Following the annexation of Lower Burma in 1856, the British colonial government established the Forest Department in an effort to establish a sustainable system for logging. Coming mainly from the Pegu Range of central Burma, logs would be pulled by elephants to rivers and then floated downstream to sawmills. The imperial demand for timber established logging as the main source of revenue for British Burma. Right before World War II, British Burma peaked logging operations, producing 447,000 tons of timber.

=== Post-independence ===
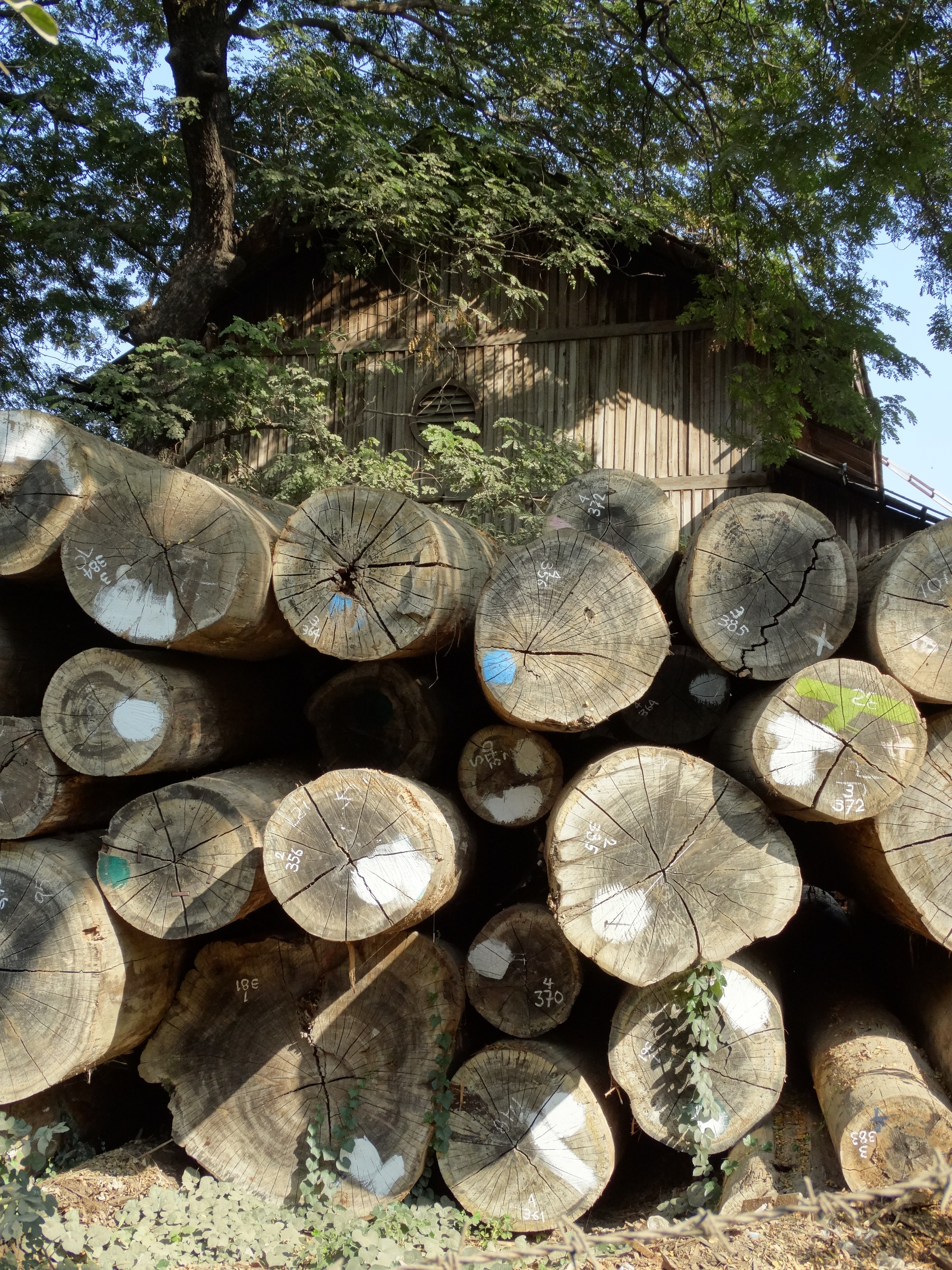
Hardwood logs near Mandalay.

After independence in 1948, ethnic uprisings and civil unrest pushed aside both conservation and logging efforts. Insurgent groups holding control of the majority of Burma's forested regions made it increasingly dangerous for the Forest Department and the State Timber Board (the government's organisation in charge of teak extraction) to carry out operations.

State logging activities recommenced with vigor, however, after the establishment of General Ne Win's military regime in 1962. The government, under military rule and the Burma Socialist Programme Party, claimed control of the forests and supported a State Timber Board nearly seven times larger than the 1952 establishment. The growth of the State Timber Board represents the growing importance of timber exports. While teak exports represented only 4% of total exports in 1952, by the late 1980s they accounted for up to 42%. As a result, over 120,000 square kilometres (46,000 sq mi) of forest cover were lost between the late 1960s and the late 1980s. Forest cover decreased from about 70% at the time of independence to 46% in the late 1980s.

The 1988 uprising and formation of the State Law and Order Restoration Council (SLORC) changed little in terms of the state's policy on deforestation. In 1989, the Burmese state made deals with 42 Thai logging companies to log within the Thai-Burmese border resulting in the deforestation over up to 18,000 square kilometres (7,000 sq mi). In 1992 the SLORC passed a new Forest Law that, for the first time, put emphasis on environmental conservation and in 1993 shut down the Thai logging deals. Despite the new law, unregulated logging operations and exports continue to threaten the hardwood forests and continue the pace of deforestation.

The deforestation rate of Myanmar declined from 0.95% per year in the years 1990–2010 to about 0.3% per year, making Myanmar's rate lower than other countries of the region such as Indonesia or Vietnam. Despite the diversity and size of Burma's forests, only 6.3% of the land was protected and much of it remained under the threat of deforestation. Three main factors contributed to continued deforestation by this stage; unsustainable and illegal logging, unresolved land rights and land disputes and extensive agricultural development.

Following political liberalisation during the 2010s, Myanmar's forest department and more than 45 non-governmental organizations and civil society groups began working to address deforestation and land tenure issues. These efforts were curtailed after the military seized power in the 2021 coup d'état. After the coup, illegal logging, mining and forest product exports all increased amidst the escalation of civil war. Conservation efforts by civil society groups were curtailed by the conflict. Timber exports are the responsibility of the Myanma Timber Enterprise and raise funds for the military government.

== Causes ==
=== Economic development ===
The Burmese Way to Socialism, lasting until 1988, left the country economically stunted and one of the world's most impoverished countries. Recent efforts to integrate back into the international economy have led to an influx of state development projects, many of which exploit Burma's natural resources and forests. International development groups such as the World Bank have emphasised across Southeast Asia the role of forests as fuel for economic growth.

While international pressure and support for economic development has increased, the technique of forest conversion has been employed in Burma since the colonial era. Burma and many other Southeast Asian states have encouraged the conversion of forested land into rice paddies, rubber plantations, teak plantations, or other exportable crops. Many rural Burmese depend on the forest for resources such as firewood, charcoal, and farm materials.

=== Illegal logging ===
Due to the size and scope of Burma's forests, it is difficult for government organisations like Forest Department to regulate logging. There is a high demand for timber from Myanmar's neighbours–notably Thailand and China–who have depleted their forests much more than Myanmar. As a result, numerous illegal logging operations have sprung up near the Thai-Burmese border and in the province of Kachin along the Chinese border. Logs are commonly cut on the Burmese side and then smuggled to processing facilities in China or Thailand.

Lack of regulations has led to unbridled and destructive logging that has caused environmental damage such as soil erosion, river contamination, and increased flooding. In Kachin State, which has some of the largest expanses of relatively untouched forest, illegal logging accounts for up to half of the deforestation. Due to the remoteness of these regions and the international demand for hardwoods, illegal logging is a threat that is hard to address and will probably continue contributing to deforestation. A major problem is that illegal logging is still classified in Myanmar as an environmental matter, and not as a criminal act, making it difficult for the Forest Department to bring a lawsuit against the offenders.

=== Agricultural expansion ===
Agricultural land has expanded across Myanmar since independence. Even though large areas of forest are not commonly cleared for agriculture, logged areas can quickly become agricultural as people take advantage of the space to plant crops.

=== War and conflict ===
Long-term internal conflict in Myanmar has facilitated the conditions for deforestation to take place. Satellite imaging of the conflict in Rakhine State suggested significant deforestation corresponded with military demolition of inhabited areas. Since the restoration of military rule and escalation of civil war following the 2021 coup d'état, illegal logging has increased as conservation activities have declined. Forest product exports from Myanmar to several European countries and the United States continued following the military takeover, despite international sanctions.

== Affected regions ==
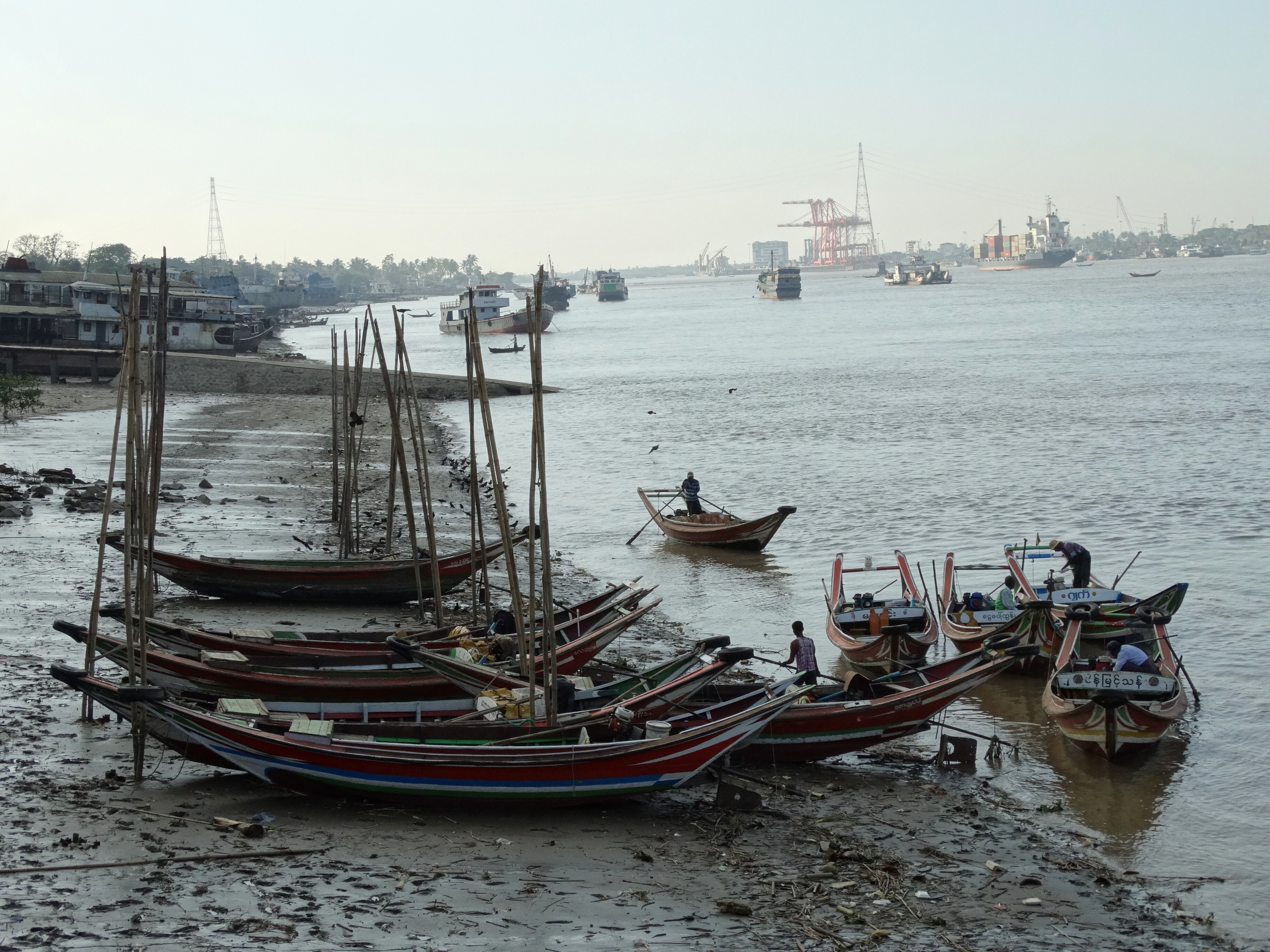
Fishing boats on the Ayeyarwady River.

In the years from 1990 to 2000, the greatest amount of deforestation in Burma occurred mainly in the more densely populated central regions of the country. More remote areas such as Kachin State, Chin State, and Tanintharyi Division had a lower rate of deforestation probably due to a smaller population demand and less state control. In the 2010s, deforestation hotspots have arisen in areas that have previously been spared, namely in Kachin State, Tanintharyi Division and Sagaing Region.

The northern edge of the central dry zone and Ayeyarwady valley is significantly affected by deforestation. Mainly a result of agricultural expansion, over 7% of this land had been deforested by 2005. This has led to many environmental concerns as the dry forests of this region support many diverse and vulnerable flora and fauna that rely on this habitat.

=== Ayeyarwady Delta ===
The Ayeyarwady Delta Region was the most threatened region, experiencing an average annual deforestation rate of 1.2% from 1990 to 2000, a rate four times the national average. The Ayeyarwady Region has a population of over 8 million people and is a large agricultural centre, accounting for about 35% of the country's rice production. As a result of agricultural expansion and the use of wood for fuel, mangrove cover declined 64.2% from 1978 to 2011 and continues to disappear. Home to some of the most diverse mangrove forests, this deforestation has significant repercussions both economically and environmentally. Mangroves provide protection from tropical cyclones, seasonal flooding, and are crucial for the fishing industry that is an important livelihood for much of the coast.

=== Tanintharyi Region ===
In 1999, the ruling military junta, the State Peace and Development Council, initiated the large-scale development of such plantations, especially in Tanintharyi Region, the southernmost region of Myanmar. As of 2019, over 401,814 ha of palm oil concessions have been awarded to 44 companies. 60% of the awarded concessions consist of forests and native vegetation, and some concessions overlap with national parks, including Tanintharyi and Lenya National Parks, which have seen significant deforestation and threaten conservation efforts for endemic species like the Indochinese tiger.

=== Mangrove forests ===
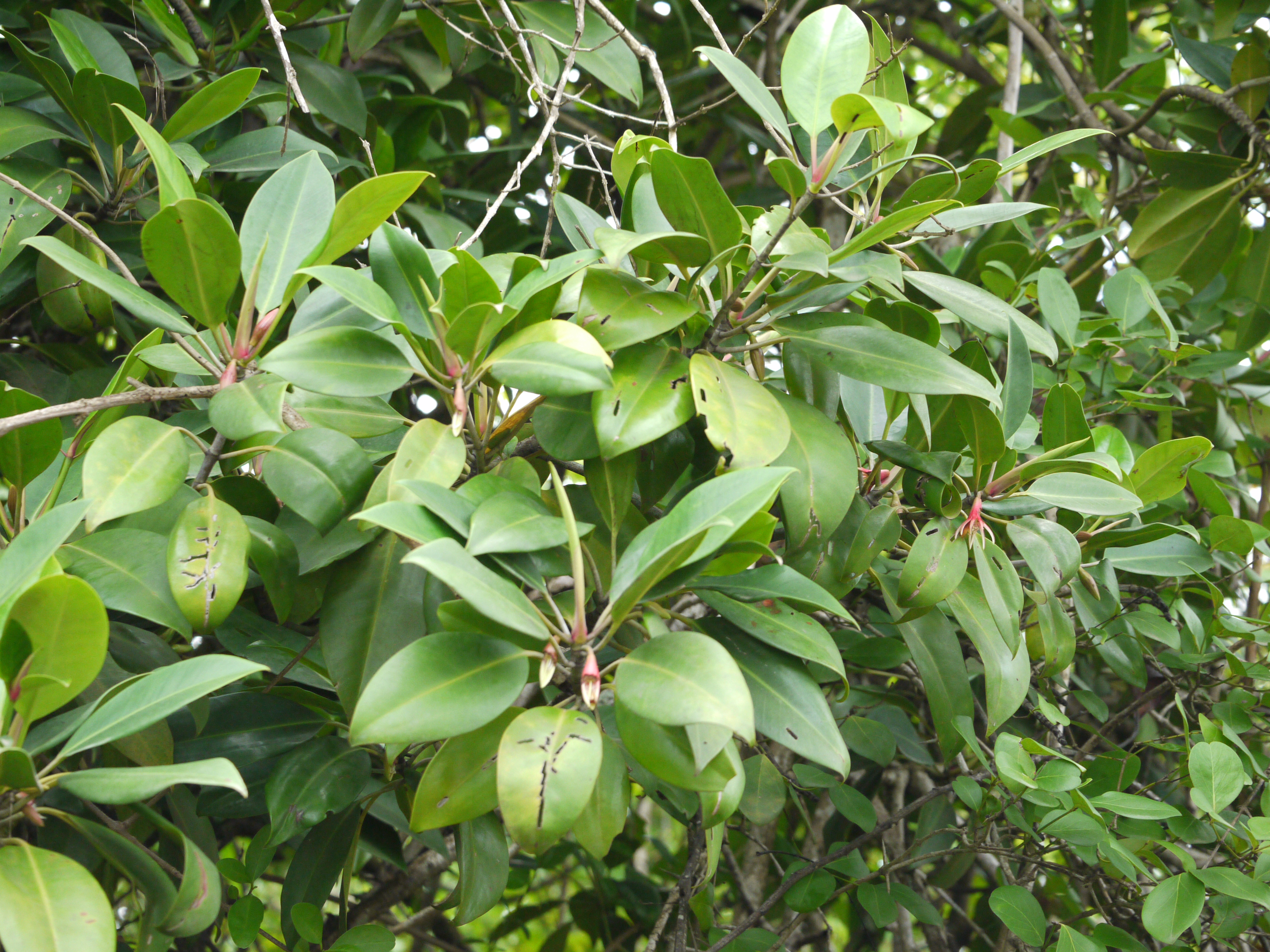
Mangroves in Myanmar

Mangrove deforestation in Myanmar is usually for commercial uses or resources extraction, and is occurring mainly in 3 different regions: Rakhine State, Ayeyarwady Mega Delta, and Tanintharyi Division. While large areas of mangrove forests remain, the deforestation rates of these forests have been increasing due to anthropogenic influences such as economic pressures to overexploit and expand the aquaculture and agricultural industry. There are also natural threats that contribute to mangrove deforestation such as soil erosion. There has been recent increased attention to conserve and restore these forests through rehabilitation projects and policies.

These mangrove forests are important to the country’s economy, climate and biodiversity. The Burmese people, especially the rural communities are heavily dependent on the resources from the mangrove forests for a living. Mangrove forests also help ameliorate negative impacts from natural disasters and are home to many different types of flora and fauna that thrive specifically in these ecosystems.

== Conservation ==
The longest standing forestry conservation practice in Burma is the traditional practice of swidden agriculture. The slash and burn techniques of forest inhabitants, the majority of whom are tribal minorities, are often blamed for causing deforestation. This practice, rather than being destructive, can be shown to cause regeneration of the forest if they are given enough space. One of the first systems of forestry management imposed by the Burmese government was the Burma Selection System (BSS), started during British colonial rule in the late 1800s. The BSS became a world-renowned system and was the basis for a sustainable forestry in Southeast Asia.

Now called the Myanmar Selection System (MSS), this technique is still used today, primarily for the management of natural teak forests. The MSS divides a forest into 30 equal plots, which are each put on a 30-year felling cycle. When a block is due for harvest, trees larger than a certain diameter are cut until allowable volume is removed. When a tree is cut, they are pulled out through the traditional use of elephants rather than large machines, which are harmful to the soil. The MSS is a sustainable approach to logging that allows forests to restore themselves and does not deplete large swaths of land.

== Tree cover extent and loss ==
Global Forest Watch publishes annual estimates of tree cover loss and 2000 tree cover extent derived from time-series analysis of Landsat satellite imagery in the Global Forest Change dataset. In this framework, tree cover refers to vegetation taller than 5 m (including natural forests and tree plantations), and tree cover loss is defined as the complete removal of tree cover canopy for a given year, regardless of cause.

For Myanmar, country statistics report cumulative tree cover loss of 5,147,299 ha (51,472.99 km^{2}) from 2001 to 2024 (about 12% of its 2000 tree cover area). For tree cover density greater than 30%, country statistics report a 2000 tree cover extent of 42,863,360 ha (428,633.6 km^{2}). The charts and table below display this data. In simple terms, the annual loss number is the area where tree cover disappeared in that year, and the extent number shows what remains of the 2000 tree cover baseline after subtracting cumulative loss. Forest regrowth is not included in the dataset.

Annual tree cover loss in Myanmar, 2001–2024. View chart definition.
Tree cover extent in 2000 minus cumulative tree cover loss in Myanmar, 2001–2024 (loss-only residual; does not account for gain). View chart definition.

Annual tree cover extent and loss
Year	Tree cover extent (km2) (Note: This residual measure does not include forest regrowth.)	Annual tree cover loss (km2)
2001	428,185.56	448.04
2002	427,524.36	661.20
2003	426,752.13	772.23
2004	425,730.27	1,021.86
2005	424,811.80	918.47
2006	423,537.16	1,274.64
2007	422,071.17	1,465.99
2008	420,879.00	1,192.17
2009	418,715.94	2,163.06
2010	417,016.82	1,699.12
2011	415,659.66	1,357.16
2012	413,407.78	2,251.88
2013	410,925.92	2,481.86
2014	407,611.47	3,314.45
2015	404,678.42	2,933.05
2016	401,052.90	3,625.52
2017	397,634.46	3,418.44
2018	394,847.38	2,787.08
2019	391,753.19	3,094.19
2020	388,653.14	3,100.05
2021	385,611.62	3,041.52
2022	383,002.24	2,609.38
2023	379,930.40	3,071.84
2024	377,160.61	2,769.79

== REDD+ reference levels and forest monitoring ==
Myanmar has submitted a national forest reference (emission) level under the UNFCCC REDD+ framework. These reference levels are used as benchmarks in the context of results-based payments, and each submission is subject to a UNFCCC technical assessment.

Myanmar’s assessed reference level is based on a historical reference period of 2005–2015 and is reported as an annual average. It covers two REDD+ activities: “reducing emissions from deforestation” (gross deforestation, defined as conversion of forest land use to non-forest land use) and “enhancement of forest carbon stocks” (forest gain from non-forest land use). The UNFCCC technical assessment reported assessed values of 53,807,463 t CO2 eq per year for deforestation and −3,351,332 t CO2 eq per year for enhancement (with the deforestation component revised from 48,607,511 t CO2 eq per year in the original submission during the assessment process). The submission reported CO2 only, including above-ground biomass, below-ground biomass and litter for deforestation and above-ground biomass for enhancement of forest carbon stocks.

For activity data, Myanmar used satellite-based forest area change estimates for 2005–2015 (via stratified random sampling based on Global Forest Change maps adjusted to Myanmar’s forest definition) and derived emission and removal factors from national forest inventory measurements at district level. While a standalone National forest monitoring system submission is not listed on the UNFCCC REDD+ web platform, Myanmar’s reference level submission describes ongoing development of a national forest monitoring system, including action plans for NFMS and FREL/FRL development prepared in 2015 and implementation work linked to national forest inventory and monitoring initiatives. Myanmar has also published a first summary of information on how the Cancún safeguards are addressed and respected in REDD+, including progress in designing a safeguards information system.

== See also ==
- Agriculture in Burma
- Deforestation by continent#Myanmar
- Environmental issues in Myanmar
- Ministry of Environmental Conservation and Forestry (Burma)
- Environmental impact of war
- Teak in Myanmar
- Wildlife of Burma

Forest regions of Myanmar:

- Chin Hills–Arakan Yoma montane forests
- Mizoram–Manipur–Kachin rain forests
- Myanmar coastal rain forests
- Northeast India–Myanmar pine forests

Regional:

- Deforestation in Thailand
- Deforestation in Laos
- Deforestation in Indonesia
