= Rice production in Myanmar =

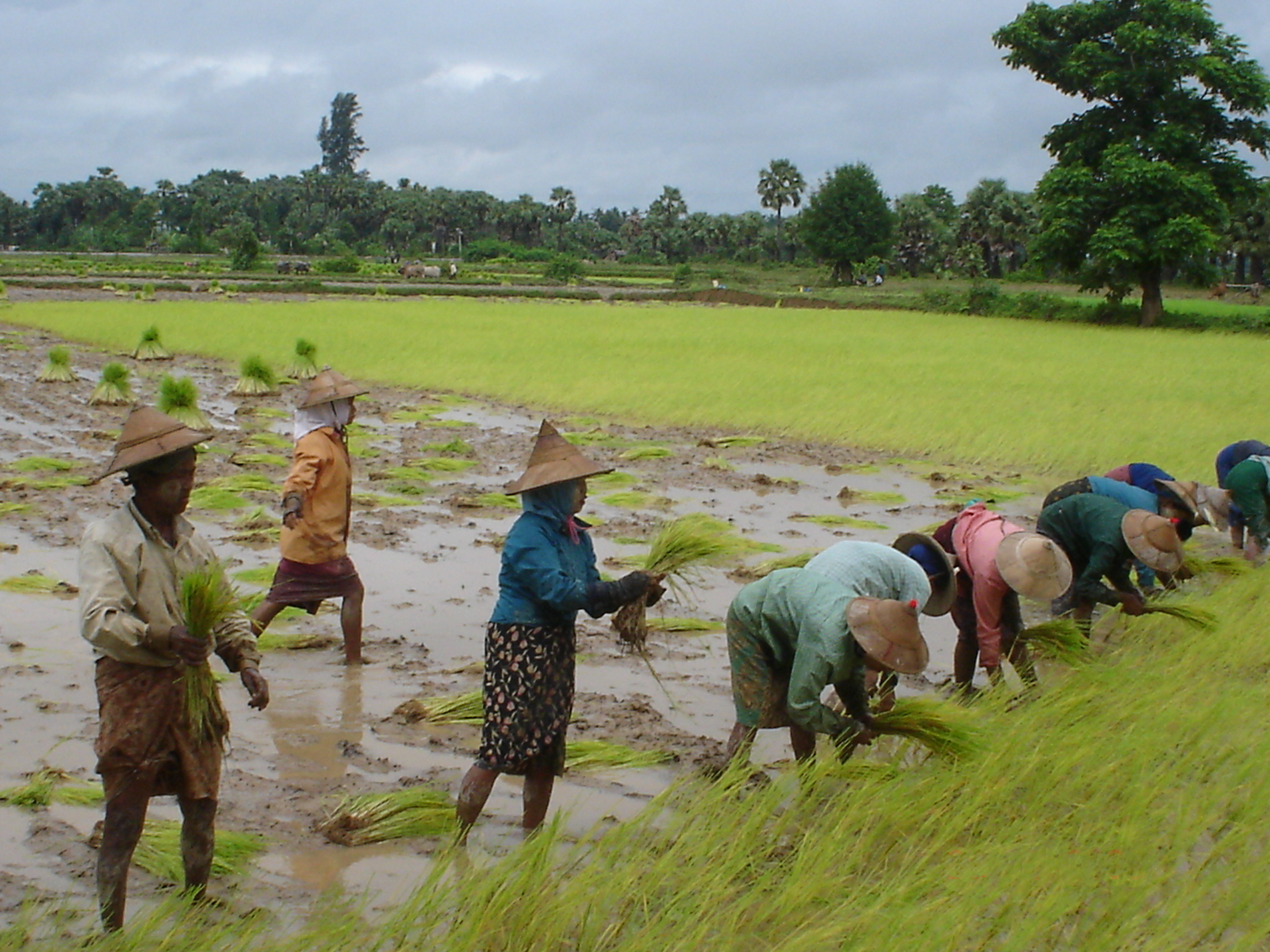
Rice plantation in Myanmar, 2006

Rice production in Myanmar accounts for approximately 43% of total agricultural production in the country, making it the seventh largest producer of rice in the world. Out of 67.6 million hectares of land, 12.8 million are used for cultivation. In 2019 alone, Myanmar accounted for 13,300 million metric tons of milled rice production.

Throughout history, Myanmar established itself as a major rice producing and exporting country due to favourable weather for rice paddies and governmental intervention in the form of agricultural policies. The production is undertaken using traditional cultivation methods, particularly during monsoon season, which has led to the development of different varieties of rice. Recent global economic policies have led to increasing international cooperation with NGOs and other organisations, that have provided financial and technological assistance to rice farmers.

== History ==
Rice has always been a staple food in Myanmar due to its ability to be cultivated regardless of location. The production of rice for economic means was encouraged as a result of British colonization thus increasing production throughout the Irrawaddy area circa 1824. In order to increase exports to Europe, the British government introduced schemes to improve transportation systems through the migration of people to the Lower Myanmar region. By doing so, it secured the three main resources needed for rice production - labor, land and capital - resulting in the growth of 92% of the principal rice growing districts.

Immediately before World War II Myanmar was the largest rice producer in the world, with a multitude of exporting partners throughout Asia and Europe. However, after 1945 approximately half of all cultivation land was abandoned as a result of mass migration from rural to developed areas. Governmental intervention began during a 10-year period from 1955, through the introduction of the Land Nationalization Act that ensured land security and loans, among other incentives which increased rice production. Additionally, war-affected countries became self-sufficient, therefore no longer relying on imports from other countries. This meant that production was disrupted, and rice trading partners became unreliable, resulting in competitors such as Thailand emerging and dominating the rice export industry with superior rice grain quality and prices.

As a means to implement stronger economic policies throughout the late 20th century, scientific advancements in rice cultivation became the norm as well as international aid from the International Rice Research Institute (IRRI). As a result, rice production increased more than 80% during this time.

== Geography of Myanmar ==
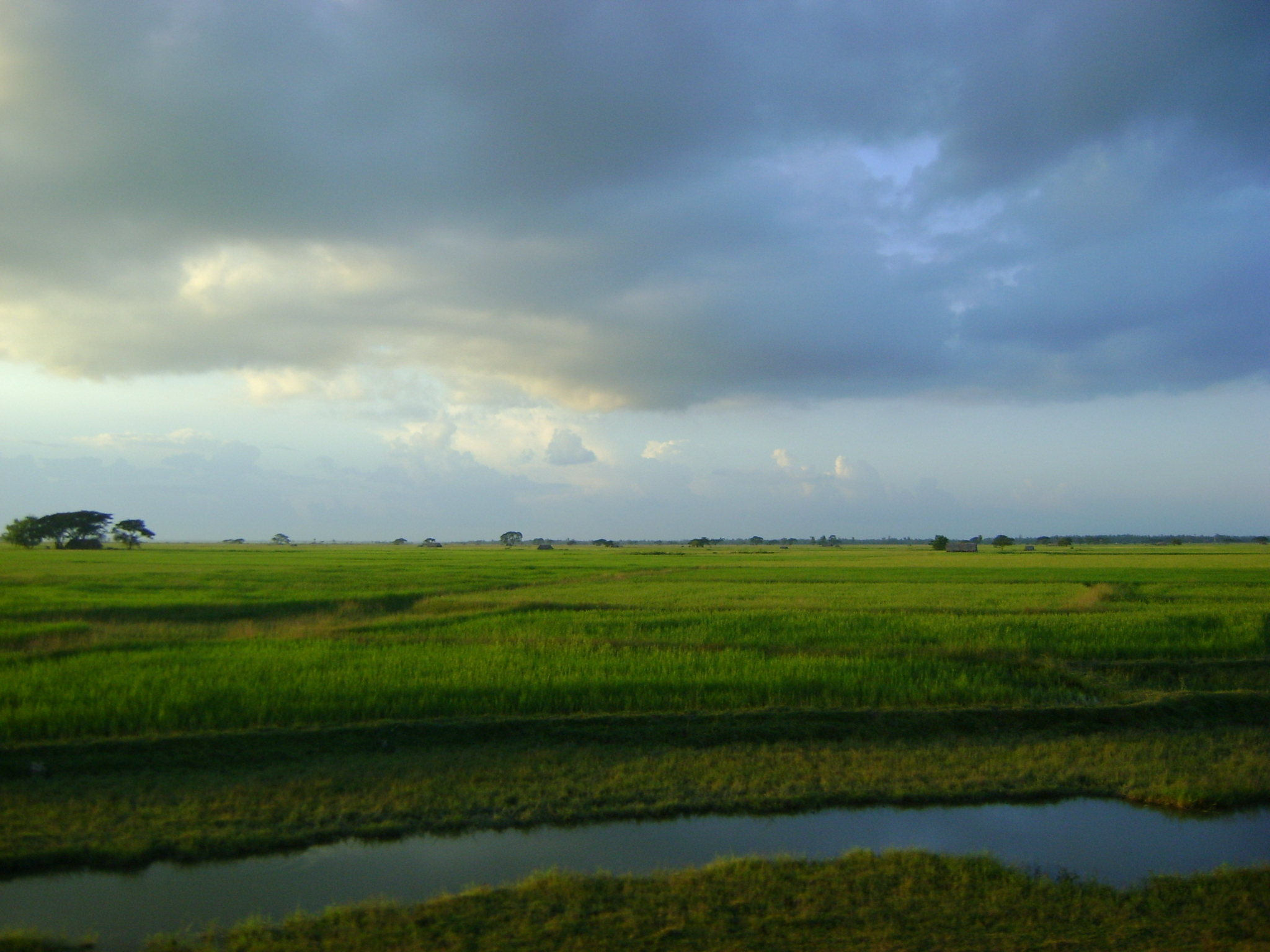
Paddy fields in Myanmar

The climate across the majority of Myanmar allows for rice cultivation to dominate the national economy as the primary export. Rice production is based on its environment, resulting in rain-fed lowland rice, winter rice, deep-water rice, upland rice and irrigated rice. Out of the three distinct seasons, the monsoon season is the main rice production season as rice paddies rely on copious amounts of water. The annual rainfall averages from 800–5,000 millimetres (31–197 in) during monsoon season from May to October.

Primarily rice is grown in across the Ayeyarwady Delta, including Ayeyarwady, Bago and Yangon regions due to the major river system running across. These respectively account for 33.59%, 17.72% and 10.07% of the total harvestable area. However, the Dry Zone, which includes Mandalay, Sagaing and Magway, as well as coastal regions of Mon and Rakhine States also play a minor role in rice production.

During the monsoon season, the delta region accounts for 7,218 million tons of rice, the Dry Zone accounts for 3,564 million tons, coastal accounts for 1,836 million tons and mountainous regions account for 2,296 million tons.

== Rice production ==
Rice production in Myanmar is heavily dependent on human and animal power, both traditional methods of cultivation. The country has four types of soils that ensure optimal rice growing: gleysols, fluvisols, humic planosols and vertisols. Although soil has a large impact on rice yields, there are many constraints that affect production. Constraints to the rice industry have varied throughout history, generally being a consequence of governmental action. Additional constraints include unpredictable weather that directly impacts the rice yield, such as the flooding in July/August 2018 which caused a 1.5% decline in rice production, as well as low seed quality and fertilizer amounts. A study found that high fertilizer prices, shortages of irrigated water and the educational level of farmers was hindering rice production growth.

To produce rice, the land is prepared according to the environmental region where the paddy is located. In rain-fed lowlands, the preferred method of establishing crops is manual transplanting where the rice is partially submerged (known as wet rice cultivation).

There are three types of growing conditions as part of wet rice cultivation:

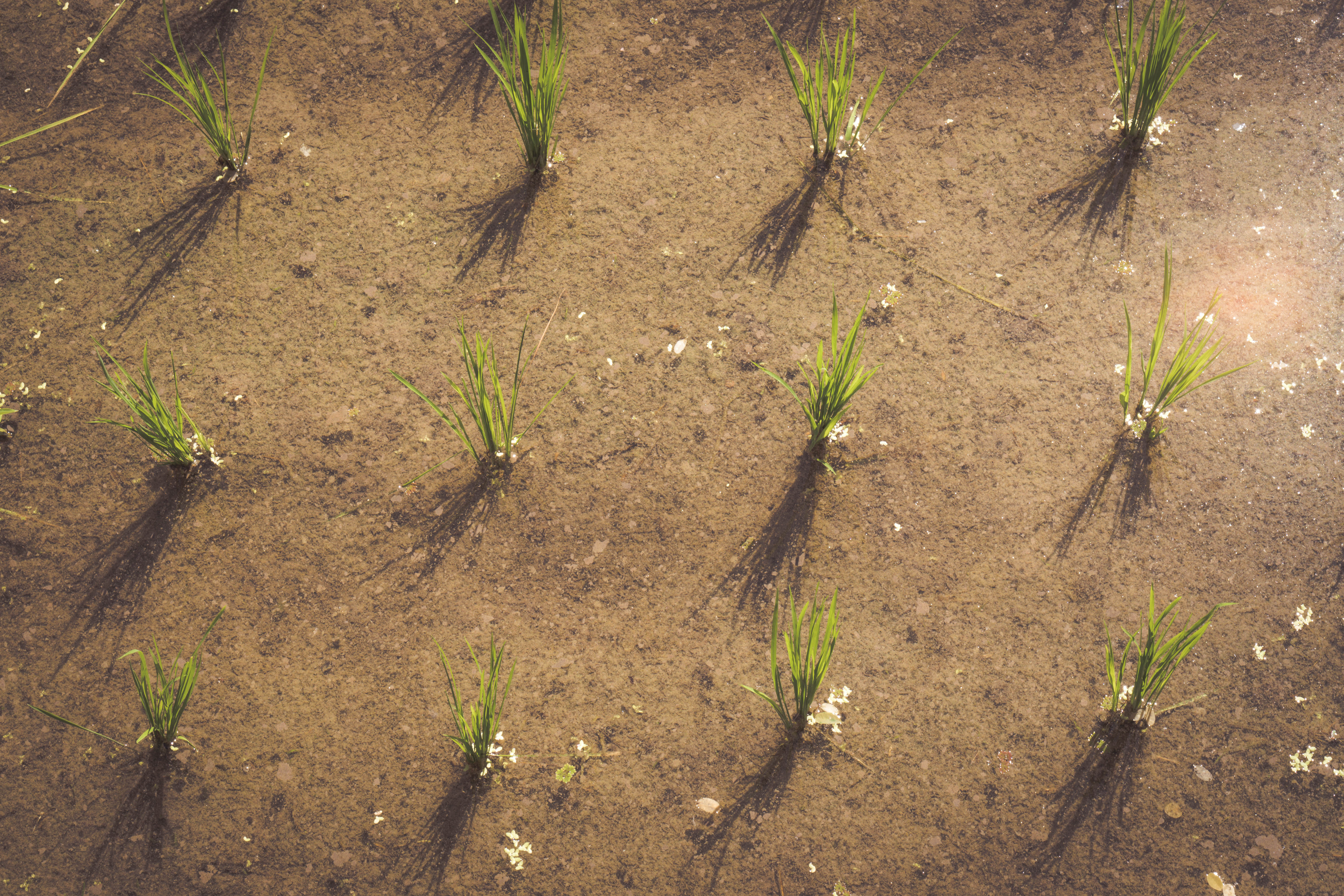
Close-up of rice paddy

- Plants are kept partially submerged by natural rainfall during monsoon season.
- Plants are kept partially submerged due to natural drainage/irrigation in conjunction with natural rainfall.
- Plants are grown on bordering lakes prone to flooding.

In upland and deep-water rice plantations, direct seeding is the preferred method. This involves broadcasting or dibbling non-germinated seeds to dry soils in order to establish crops, which are transplanted during monsoon season.

Historically, rice was cultivated during monsoon season once a year, with rare pulse crops planted among heavy clay soil areas in the delta following the main rice harvest. Today, thanks to irrigation systems, rice can be grown year long. During monsoon season, the rice crops require minimal intervention and are generally planted at the end of November.

=== Rice varieties ===
Approximately 2,000 varieties of rice have been found to exist in Myanmar. They can be classified based on time of yield:

- Pre-monsoon rice: Occupies approximately 2% of total harvestable area. It is sown with irrigation in March and harvested in July. This type of rice is planted in central Myanmar.
- Monsoon rice: Occupies approximately 80% of rice harvestable area. It is sown in mid-June and transplanted in mid-July, to be harvested in mid-October. This type of rice is planted all over the country.
- Late monsoon rice: Occupies approximately 2% of total harvestable area and is sown in August to be transplanted in September and ultimately harvested in January. This rice is planted in low-lying areas of the delta.
- 'Mayin rice'/winter rice: This type of rice covers about 15% of the total harvestable area, being sown in November, transplanted one month later and then harvested in March. This is most commonly planted along river valleys.

== Supply and trade ==
Production and export of rice (Myanmar)
Year	Production (in '000 tonnes)	Exports (in '000 tonnes)
2014/2015	12,600	1,734
2015/2016	12,200	1,800
2016/2017	12,500	1,600

Throughout history, the government of Myanmar has been heavily involved in creating policies to aid rice production. Since 1989, the State Law and Order Restoration Council (SLORC) has allowed private traders, and private companies to engage in trading activities by liberating food grain trade. This is as in 1988, the national economy had reached a low point in grain exports and thus caused a major debt crisis. The SLORC additionally had other incentives created to encourage growth in the grain export industry. These were:

- Extending agricultural loans
- Reducing import tariffs in order to encourage imports of prioritized production
- Conducting public workshops, seminars and lectures by the Ministry of Transport to develop business management skills
- Encouraging farmers to save funds by opening new branches of the Myanmar Agricultural and Rural Development Bank

In 1995, Myanmar became a member of the World Trade Organisation (WTO) and the Association of South East Asian Nations (ASEAN) two years later. Market-oriented policies were adopted by the government as a form of embracing economic globalization, the state relinquished control mechanisms over production and marketing in agriculture (the rice industry in this instance). This allowed for stronger relationships to be built among exporting partners and other ASEAN member countries.

Export by type of rice, 2016-17
1. White long grain (42.8%)
2. White short grain (31.7%)
3. Parboiled rice (0.94%)
4. Glutinous rice (0.14%)
5. Other rice (0.01%)
6. Broken rice (24.4%)

By becoming a democratic government, Myanmar has taken steps to create policies targeting the rice industry, and has introduced land use rights that became transferable and able to be mortgaged (introduced in 2012: the Farmland Law and the Vacant, Virgin and Fallow lands management law). Additionally, the rice export tax was reduced to 2% and enabled the expansion of the private sector of paddy trading and milling through the creation of the Myanmar Rice Federation (MRF) in the same year.

As a result of the SLORC incentives, rice export numbers reached 1.8 million tons in 2015/16, with China being the major importing partner (part of the ASEAN + 3 group). Both the Chinese and Burmese governments completed a Memorandum of Understanding (MOU) which allowed Myanmar 400,000 metric tons of rice exports to China, with equal amounts of Chinese products imported into Myanmar. This agreement came to fruition due to large numbers of rice smuggling instances that caused exports from Myanmar to decrease exponentially. Furthermore, the Chinese government would increase anti-smuggling operations as part of the agreement.

Rice export (destination)
Destination	Percentage of rice export		
	2012/2013	2013/2014	2014/2015
EU	5.4	5.7	11.1
ASEAN	18.2	11.8	5.4
(ASEAN) + 3	53.6	73.8	76.1
Middle East	0.7	0.7	1.8
Africa	14.2	0.2	0.2
Other	7.9	7.9	5.4

Currently, white long grain, white short grain and white broken rice make up the largest part of Myanmar's rice exports, mainly being exported to China and other ASEAN countries.

== International cooperation ==
The United Nations Development Program logo

The Myanmar Agricultural Development Bank (MADB) provided seasonal loans to farmers that approximate to US $1.12 billion in 2018. This loan is provided to a maximum of 10 acres of harvest able land with an 8% interest rate. However, not only does Myanmar aid its farmers, but other countries offer substantial loans in order to upkeep the agricultural industry. An example would be the four-year loan program offered by the Japan International Cooperation Agency (JICA). JICA offers Two Step loans for a period of four years with the cooperation of both Japanese and Myanmar governments.

The International Rice Research Institute in Los Baños, Philippines has not only offered financial help but has made scientific advancements through research on rice yields, releasing early-maturing, high-yielding verities of rice whilst encouraging modern farming techniques. This has increased yield size and rate of growth, equipping farmers with the required knowledge to get the best yield.

Other international organisations such as the United Nations Development Program (UNDP), the World Bank and the Asian Development Bank provide assistance to the country's development plans. In particular, the UNDP provides socio-economic reports and collects data in conjunction with the government, to develop new policies and provide aid. For example, in 2015 the UNDP and the IRRI joined forces to provide flood affected rice farmers in the Rakhine State with seeds.

At the end of 2013, members of the president's cabinet, including the Minister for Agriculture and Irrigation, engaged in dialogue with IRRI in relation to developing a stronger partnership in rice research. The following year, the government targeted the education of farmers by holding learning alliance meetings, which led to knowledge new harvesting technologies and a reduction of losses. In 2015, the government and IRRI joined forces to develop and implement the Myanmar Rice Sector Development Strategy (MRSDS), in the hopes of regaining its previous role in the global rice market. Finally, in 2016 these partnerships eventually resulted in the 12-step economic policy released by the government of Myanmar, one of the main goals being to "support the formation of crops, livestock and fisheries producer groups..."
