= Merf =

Merf or MERF can refer to:

- Merchant Freighter
- Middle East Reformed Fellowship
- Male-exclusionary radical feminism

== See also ==
- MRF (disambiguation)
