= MPU =

MPU or Mpu may refer to:

== Science and technology ==
- Medical-grade polyurethane, a polyurethane used in medicine; for example see Vas-occlusive contraception

=== Computing ===
- Memory protection unit, for example in the ARM Cortex-M
- Microprocessor unit, a central processing unit when referring to digital signal processors
- MPU-401 (MIDI Processing Unit), an obsolete standard for MIDI interfaces for personal computers
- Multi-core processing unit, a system made of two or more independent cores; see History of general-purpose CPUs

== Other uses ==
- Mabua Airstrip (IATA code: MPU), an airport in Papua New Guinea
- Melbourne Poets Union, a forerunner of Australian Poetry and later reincarnated under the same name
- Minimum publishable unit, the smallest piece of a scientist's results that can be made into an academic paper
- Myanmar Payment Union, a Myanmar financial services corporation
- Medical-psychological assessment in Germany, called MPU for Medizinisch-Psychologische Untersuchung
- Missing persons unit, a police unit to locate missing persons
  - Missing Persons Unit, an Australian TV documentary series
  - Alert: Missing Persons Unit, an American TV fiction series
- More Perfect Union (media organization)
- Mpu, a type of Kongo headwear
- Union Political Movement, a Moldovan political bloc named Mișcarea Politică Unirea in Romanian
