= Myanma Apex Bank =

Myanma Apex Bank (MAB)
- Native name: မြန်မာ့ရှေ့ဆောင်ဘဏ်
- Type: Private
- Industry: Bank
- Founded: July 2, 2010
- Headquarters: Ottarathiri Township, Nay Pyi Taw, Myanmar (Burma)
- Total assets: Ks.529 billion (2012-13)
- Owner: Chit Khine
- Website: www.mabbank.com

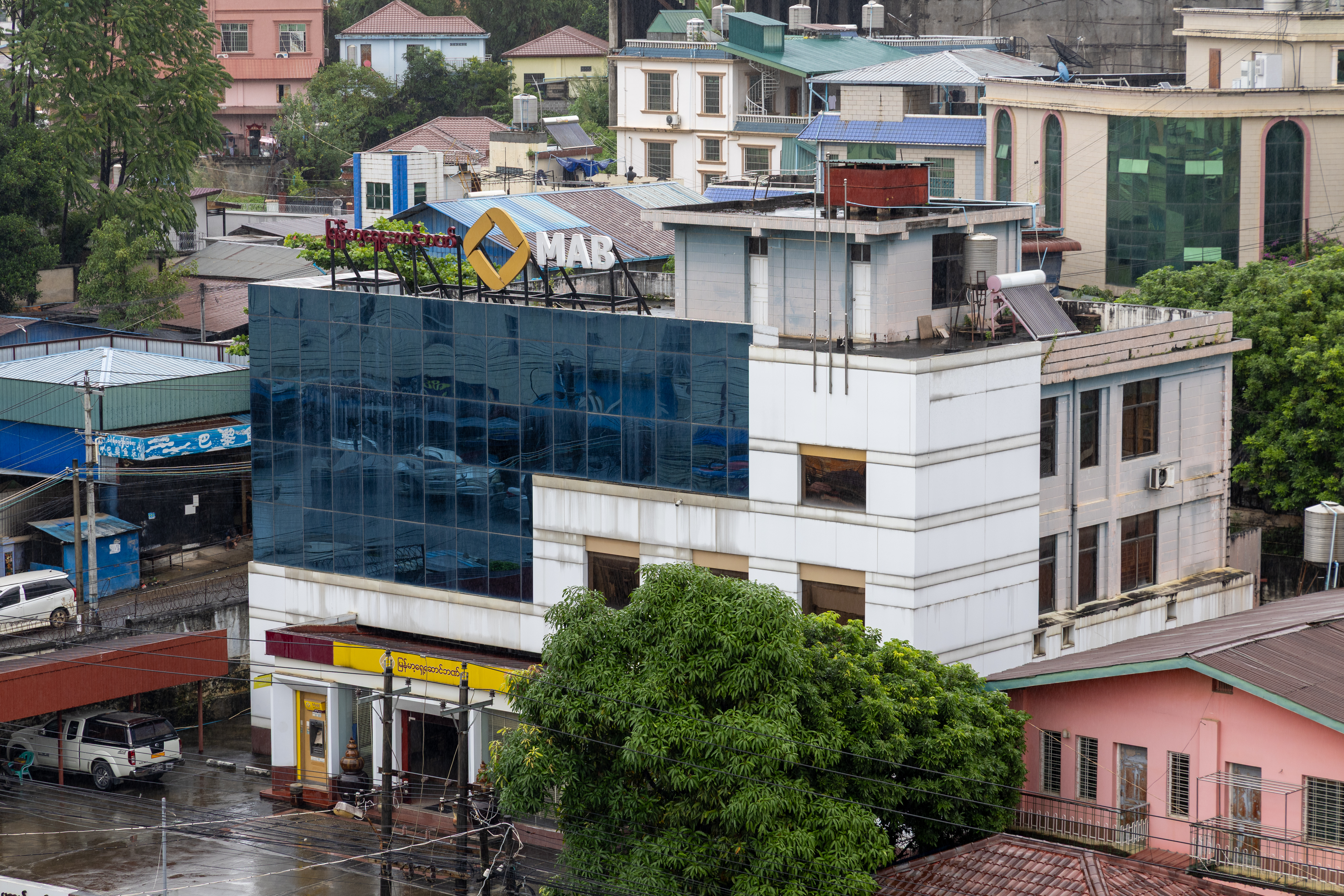
MAB Muse Branch

Myanma Apex Bank (Burmese: မြန်မာ့ရှေ့ဆောင်ဘဏ်; abbreviated MAB) is a private commercial bank in Myanmar.

Myanma Apex Bank Ltd (MAB) was incorporated on 2 July 2010, established as a subsidiary of Eden Group of Companies., and opened its first branch office in Naypyitaw on 17 August 2010. Among the more than 20 banks in Myanmar, MAB is considered to be among the top 4 banks. As of early 2020, MAB had 102 branches nationwide.

== Financial services ==
MAB offers a variety of financial services, such as consumer deposit offerings, ATM, POS acceptance network using Myanmar Payment Union (MPU), VISA and MasterCard cards, commercial financing for small and medium businesses with loans, overdraft and hire purchases options, cross-border trade, as well as providing businesses with foreign trade finance, gift cheques, payment orders, remittance and other ancillary services. MAB has launched a wealth banking and rewards program called MAB Wealth Banking in order to support the growing number of high net worth customers in Myanmar.

== Global partnerships ==
Myanma Apex Bank (MAB) has established local and international partnerships with organizations including:

- Visa
- MasterCard
- UnionPay
- Western Union
- VAT IT

== Awards and CSR activities ==
MAB was recognised as one of the top 500 income taxpayers for the 2012-2013 financial year. In celebration of its 10th anniversary, Myanma Apex Bank (MAB) made a donation towards the salaries of teachers at monastic schools in Yangon to provide for improved education through their corporate social responsibility program, “Better Giving”. MAB also organized “The MAB Sayaungchel Run 2020” as a part of its 10th Anniversary Celebration. The MAB ဆေးရောင်ခြယ် Run is an untimed race that is suitable for everyone of any athletic background. All revenue from the sale of event tickets were donated, with Ks.18.5 million contributed towards the development of the Myanmar education sector and Ks.100 million towards urban development in Mandalay.
