= Agriculture in Myanmar =

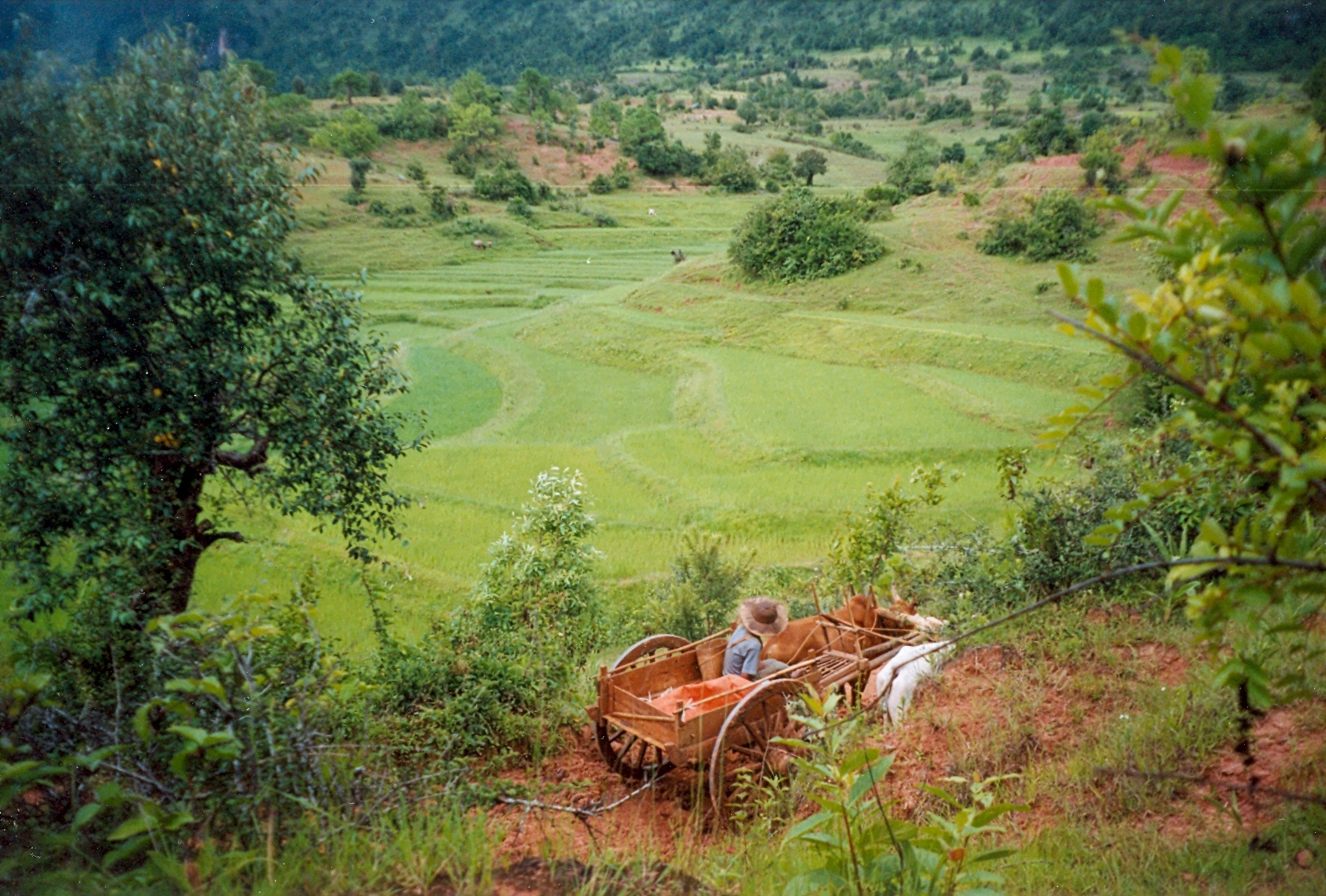
Farmland in Burma

Agriculture in Myanmar (also known as Burma) is the main industry in the country, accounting for 60 percent of the GDP and employing some 65 percent of the labour force. Burma was once Asia's largest exporter of rice, and rice remains the country's most crucial agricultural commodity.

Other main crops include pulses, beans, sesame, groundnuts, sugarcane, lumber, and fish. Moreover, livestock are raised as both a source of food and labour.

== Agricultural products ==
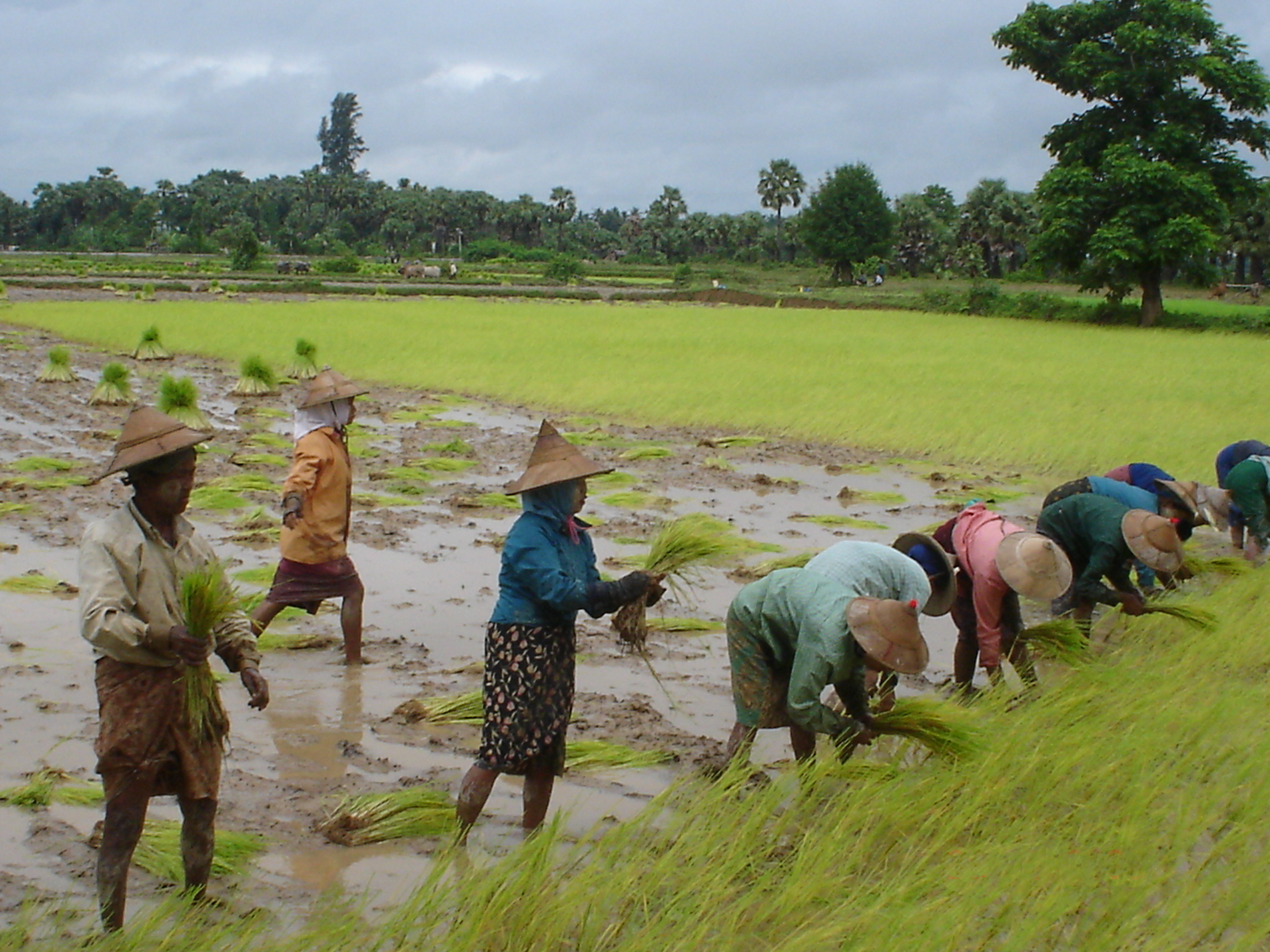
Rice planting in Burma, 2006

=== Crops ===
- Rice
- Corn
- Pulses
- Peas
- Onions
- Groundnuts
- Niger seeds
- Sesame
- Spices - coriander, ginger, turmeric, red chili
- Sugarcane
- Lumber – see Forestry (below)

==== Methods ====
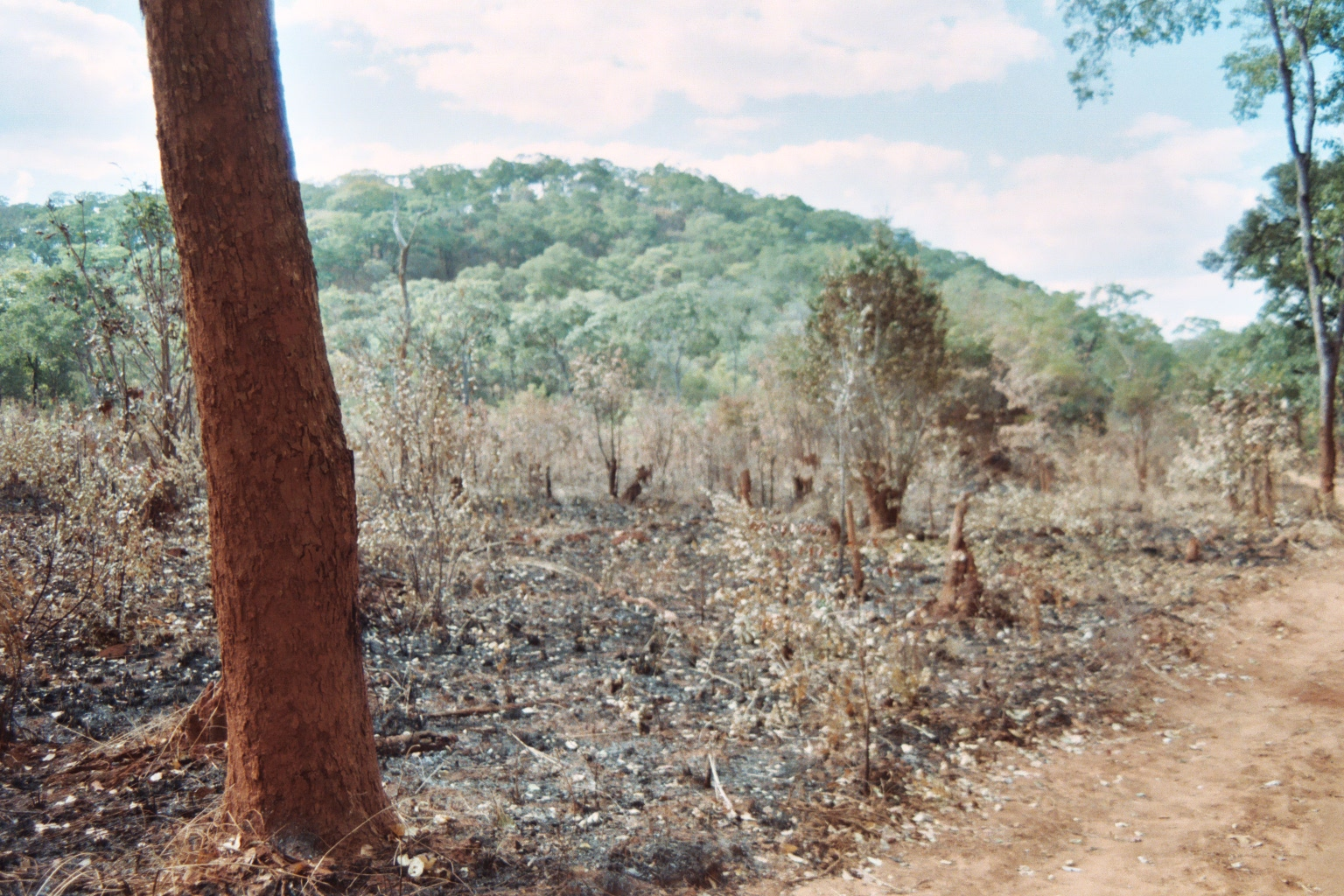
An example of slash-and-burn farming methods, seen here in use in Northwestern Zambia

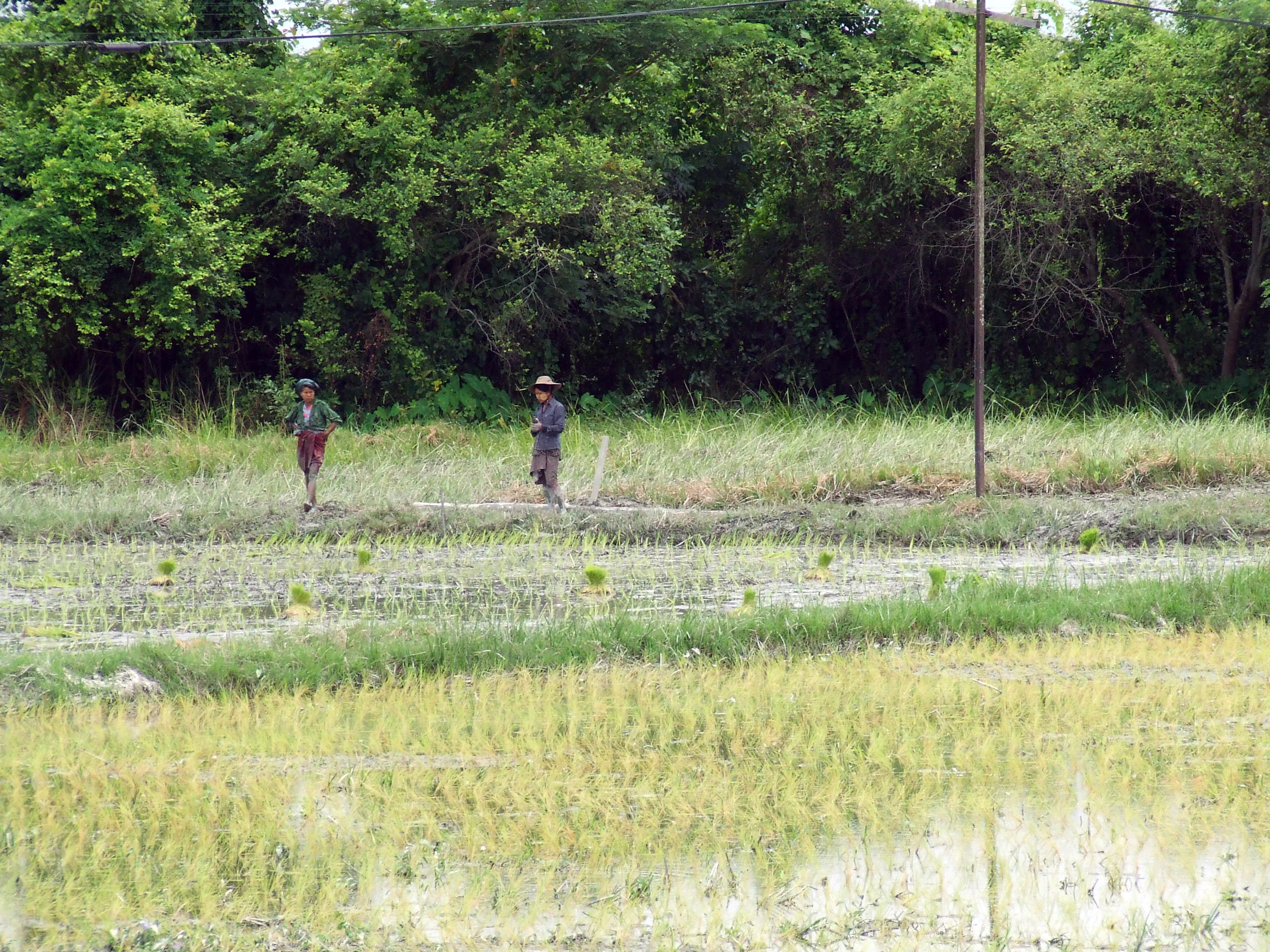
A rice paddy in the Chin State, Burma

Historically and at present, the primary method for rendering arable land is the slash-and-burn method (also known as "shifting cultivation" or "swiddening"). This involves setting fire to areas of primary forest or secondary forest to create fields where crops can be cultivated. After these fields are used for a time and the nutrients in the soil are used up, the land is abandoned and allowed to grow freely. Growth begins in one to three years following the land's abandonment, and within 10 to 20 years it is once again able to hold an established secondary forest.

Sometimes, this arable land is converted into rice paddies, a common agricultural technique in southern and eastern Asia. In Burma, the paddies are flooded only occasionally by rivers, while a majority of the time farmers rely on the monsoon season for the necessary water. The paddies have an "impermeable subsoil", on top of which is a saturated layer of mud, and lastly around 4–6 inches of water.

=== Livestock ===
Farmers in Burma raise livestock for both food and labour purposes. This includes cattle, water buffalo, goats, sheep, oxen, chickens, and pigs. Oxen and water buffalo are used as draft animals throughout the country, while most cattle are raised in the drier northern regions. Goats are kept by farmers in pasture for their milk.

Farmers in Burma were affected by the outbreak of the H5N1 bird flu strand in Asia. Initially, the Mandalay and Sagaing regions of Burma were affected, and this resulted in the culling of several thousand chickens, quails and their eggs. However, as of 2006, the country's livestock officials announced a plan to fund the restocking of birds and feed for the affected poultry farms.

As of at least 2024, Myanmar has the largest amount of cattle herding in southeast Asia. Myanmar's domestic beef consumption is not high because of religious reasons and because of cattle's utility as a farm animal. The 2012 Major Commodity and Service Law prohibited the export of live cattle, although a lack of enforcement Myanmar meant that significant smuggling out of the country occurred. In 2017, Aung San Suu Kyi's government lifted the ban and began regulating cattle exports as a revenue-raising measure.

=== Fishing ===
Fishing makes up a fair portion of Burma's food production. Fishing occurs in both salt and freshwater, and it is estimated that there are up to 300 species in the Burmese fresh waters. Of these, there are several endemic species, including the Indostromus paradoxus of the Indawgyi Lake in Northern Burma. Moreover, dried and salted fish is an integral part of the country's cuisine, and the primary source of protein in the Burmese diet.

In Burma, there are several types of fisheries, including coastal or inshore fisheries, and offshore or deep-sea fisheries. A majority of these fish are harvested by commercial means, which includes the use of trawling nets, purse seins, driftnet and gillnet. A minority still use traditional techniques, such as hook-and-line, cast net, bag net, trammel gill net, lift net, and traps. In 2003, trawling accounted for 40% of fish caught.

In the 1980s, the Burmese government sought to encourage deep-sea fishing, and since then there has been a steady increase in the yearly catches. In 1989, Thai companies were given permission to fish in the coastal waters of Burma, using trawlers to harvest fish.

=== Forestry ===
Though Burma's neighbours, such as India, China, and Thailand, have depleted most of their forests, and despite slash-and-burn techniques, Burma is still considered to be relatively rich in forests and the resources they provide. It is considered by some to be "the last frontier of biodiversity in Asia." In Burma, teak, acadia, bamboo, and ironwood are raised, harvested, and exported. The country is the leading supplier of teak in the international market, and is a substantial supplier of bamboo.

== Economic significance ==
Agriculture and the processing of agricultural products provides a majority of the employment and income in Burma, producing around 60% of the national GDP and employing as many as 65% of the population. While Burma yields more than enough food to feed its entire population, many still go hungry for lack of purchasing power.

As of 2007, Burma's main countries of export were Thailand (receiving 44%), India (14.5%), China (7%), and Japan (6%). By 2010, China had become a key export partner, receiving 97% of Burmese-produced corn and 9% of beans and pulses. These figures came as a result of increasing Chinese demand and an increasingly healthy trading relationship.

Since 2001, total agricultural exports have been down: in 2001–2002 Burma exported 939,000 tons of rice and 1,035,000 tons of pulses, whereas in 2010–2011 536,000 tons of rice and 920,000 tons of pulses were exported. This could be the result of increased demand for these products within the country, as opposed to a response to decreased production. The decrease in emphasis on exporting agricultural goods could reflect a response to the fluctuating value of the Burmese kyat as it relates to other nations' currencies. Instead, attention was directed towards creating "non-traded services," like construction, or to the production of goods with a high "price to cost ratio," like gems, jade and natural gas.

== Environmental impact ==
At present, there is debate over the environmental impact of the varied farming methods used in Burma. Some credit slash-and-burn farming methods with "destroying the forests of the country, causing soil erosion and depletion of fertility," considering it to be reckless deforestation. Recently, the Burmese Government has increased its attempted regulation of farming practices, and this includes banning slash-and-burn tactics in some villages.

However, some consider forcing a change from slash-and-burn methods to the more commercial methods of "permanent" agriculture to be even worse for the environment. They assert that the slash-and-burn method completes part of a cycle of forestation wherein a new secondary forest is allowed to grow once the land has been cultivated. Thus, devoting an area completely to a particular crop disrupts this pattern and renders the land completely unusable after a period of time.

Because farmers in Burma rely on the monsoon season as their primary water source, they are subject to the recent fluctuating weather patterns. For example, the Burmese rice crop was negatively affected by a record high rainfall during the prolonged 2011 monsoon season which resulted in a projected 10 percent drop in production.
