= MRF =

MRF or mrf may stand for:

== Military ==
- Medical Response Force, the elite medical arm of the Singapore Armed Forces Medical Corps
- Military Reaction Force, a British military unit in Belfast
- Missouri Reserve Force, the official state defense force of Missouri, U.S.
- Mobile Riverine Force, a joint U.S. Army and U.S. Navy force in the Vietnam War
- Maritime Raid Force, a U.S. Marine Corps unit that conducts maritime boarding actions
- Mirage Rebuild Factory, part of the Pakistan Aeronautical Complex
- Multirole fighter, a class of military attack aircraft intended to perform different roles in combat

== Organizations and companies ==
- MRF (company), an Indian manufacturer of rubber products
- Fjord1 MRF, a Norwegian transportation company
- Morgellons Research Foundation, group focused on Morgellons, a form of delusional parasitosis
- Mountain River Films, a Nepalese independent film-production company
- Movement for Rights and Freedoms, a Bulgarian political party
- MRF Pace Foundation, a coaching clinic in India for training fast bowlers
- Myanmar Rice Federation, Burma's national organisation for the rice industry

== Science ==
- Magnetic resonance fingerprinting, a methodology in quantitative MRI characterized by a pseudo-randomized acquisition strategy
- Markov random field, in physics and probability, a random field that satisfies Markov properties
- Midbrain reticular formation, a structure in the midbrain
- Multiprogram Research Facility, at the Oak Ridge National Laboratory in Oak Ridge, Tennessee, U.S.
- Myelin gene Regulatory Factor, a protein critical to myelin
- Myelin Repair Foundation, an American non-profit medical research organization
- Myogenic regulatory factors, a group of proteins regulating myogenesis

== Technology ==
- Magnetorheological finishing, a precision surface-finishing technology
- Magnetorheological fluid, a type of smart fluid in a carrier fluid
- Media Resource Function, a component of an IP Multimedia Subsystem
- Material Recovery Facility, a specialized plant that receives, separates and prepares recyclable materials for marketing to end-user manufacturers.

== Transportation ==
- Marfa Airport, Marfa, Presidio County, Texas, U.S.
- Moorfields railway station, in Liverpool, England

== Other uses ==
- Macomb Correctional Facility, a prison in New Haven, Macomb County, Michigan, U.S.
- Materials recovery facility, a specialized plant that processes recyclable materials
- Mississippi River Festival, a summer outdoor concert series from 1969 to 1980 in Illinois, U.S.
- Elseng language (ISO 639 code)
- Maldivian rufiyaa, currency of the Maldives

== See also ==
- MRF Challenge, an open-wheel motorsport formula based in India
