= Myanmar Payment Union =

Myanmar financial services corporation

- Company type: Private
- Industry: Banking, Finance
- Founded: September 2011; 14 years ago
- Headquarters: Yangon, Myanmar
- Members: 23
- Website: www.myanmarpaymentunion.com

Myanmar Payment Union (MPU) is a Myanmar financial services corporation headquartered in Yangon, Myanmar. It provides bank card services and a major card scheme in Myanmar. MPU was founded on 15 September 2011 with total of 16 members from both state and privately owned banks, and expanded to 23 members as of 19 Jan 2017. When it first started, its purpose was to provide the ATM and POS (Point of Sale) switching services among the banks.

MPU cards have been issued since 14 September 2012. As a result, all bank card holders can withdraw and check their balances and remittances to and from their fund at any ATM at any of the participating banks.

== History ==
With the direction of the Central Bank of Myanmar, Myanmar Payment Union was organized on 15 September 2011 in Yangon by state owned and private banks. On 23 November 2012, Japan Credit Bureau (JCB) signed an agreement on the use of its payment system at the Myanmar Banks Association and CUP followed suit the next day. Within this agreement holders of international bank cards with agreements with either JCB or CUP will be able to use them in the automatic teller machines of the member banks of the Myanmar Payment Union.

== Co-brand Cards ==
On 18August 2017, AYA bank introduced its first JCB-MPU co-brand card to be able to use both locally and internationally.

== Members ==
- AYA Bank
- Asia Green Development Bank
- CB Bank
- KBZ Bank
- United Amara Bank
- Myanma Apex Bank
- Yoma Bank
