= Chit Khine =

- ချစ်ခိုင်
- Born: 1948 (age 77–78); Danubyu Township, Irrawaddy Division, Burma
- Occupations: Founder and Chairman of Eden Group
- Spouse: Daw Khin Soe Wai

Chit Khine (Burmese: ချစ်ခိုင်, born 1948 in Danubyu Township, Irrawaddy Division, Burma) is the chairman of the Eden Group of Companies, one of the Myanmar’s largest conglomerates, with extensive business presence in multiple industries including construction, hospitality, food and beverages, finance, oil and gas, and agricultural commodities.

== Early life ==
Chit Khine was born on 5 January 1948 in Danubyu Township, Irrawaddy Division, Burma. He graduated from University of Yangon and worked for Ministry of Energy after he graduated.

== Career ==
Chit Khine was a chair of Insein Township's National League for Democracy branch between 1989 and 1990.

Chit Khine established his first business of Eden Group in 1990, Eden Construction. The group diversified to the hotels and mining sector in 2000, agricultural sector in 2009, banking services and oil and petroleum sectors in 2010.

He is alleged to have a close relationship with the former military government, the State Peace and Development Council. Eden Group was one of the only 8 local companies involved in constructing Naypyidaw, the country's new capital. Eden projects have included the construction of the Presidential Palace and the Defence Services Museum in Naypyitaw. In exchange, the military government granted Eden Group several highly coveted licenses to import high-end automobiles into the country.

Eden Group currently operates two Hilton-brand hotels in the capital city of Naypyitaw and the western beach resort destination of Ngapali. Eden also operates smaller hotels under the Thingaha and Link brands. The Eden Group owns a collection of hotels located in key prime areas within Myanmar in Naypyitaw, Ngapali Beach, Mandalay, Bagan, Inle Lake and Ayethaya of Shan State.

In 2010, Chit Khine received private banking licenses from the Central Bank of Myanmar. In 2011, he established Myanma Apex Bank (MAB), one of the country's few private banks.

Chit Khine was formerly subject to the European Union, British, and U.S sanctions. All financial sanctions on him lifted in 2012 and 2016.

Chit Khine also owns Denko Trading which operates an industrial oil storage facility with several tanks and terminals. Denko Trading also runs fuel stations throughout the country. In 2014, the company established a 24-acre industrial oil storage terminal in Thilawa Deep Sea port.

In February 2021, the military staged the 2021 Myanmar coup d'état. On 22 April 2022, the junta detained Chit Khine in Naypyidaw, after the Anti-Corruption Commission alleged that Chit Khine had corrupt dealings between 2018 and 2021 while running a coal power station in Tigyit, Shan State.

== Philanthropy ==
Chit Khine is the Chairman of Thingaha Foundation which is a joint organization between Eden Group, MAB Bank and Denko Trading. In 2017, the foundation supported medical supplies and equipment which worth 82.89 million MMK to 550 bedded Mandalay Children Hospital. The foundation also raised K 500 million as the major donor to set up Mandalay Children Kidney Foundation for children kidney patients.

In 2019, Thingaha Foundation donated 100 lakhs to the Government of Technical College (Myingyan) for planting trees at the area. Thingaha Foundation completed remodeling the sidewalk between the east moat and 66th street which is one of the four public recreation zones, each located near the Mandalay. The foundation passed the project to the Mandalay City Development Committee in April 2019.

In January 2021, Chit Khine, Chairman of Eden Group of Companies donated $1.5 million for COVID-19 vaccination fund raised by the National Committee on COVID-19 Prevention, Control and Treatment.

== Awards and recognition ==
Chit Khine has received several awards, including:

- Excellent Performance in Social Field Badge (Second Class) 2006
- Excellent Performance in Social Field Badge (First Class) 2007
- Excellent Performance in Administrative Field Badge (Second Class) 2007
- Wunna Kyawhtin Medal 2010
- Sithu Order 2011
- Presidential Award for Excellent Performance (Best Exporter) 2013

Myanma Apex Bank (MAB) was awarded as one of the top 500 income taxpayers for the 2012-2013 financial year. In the same year, Denko Trading received an award for the top commercial taxpayers. Denko Trading has constantly topped the list of commercial taxpayers from 2014 to 2019.

== Personal life ==
Chit Khine is married to Khin Soe Wai. He has children, including Win Min Khine. His brother-in-law Hla Oo is a major-general in the Myanmar Armed Forces.
