= Environmental issues in Myanmar =

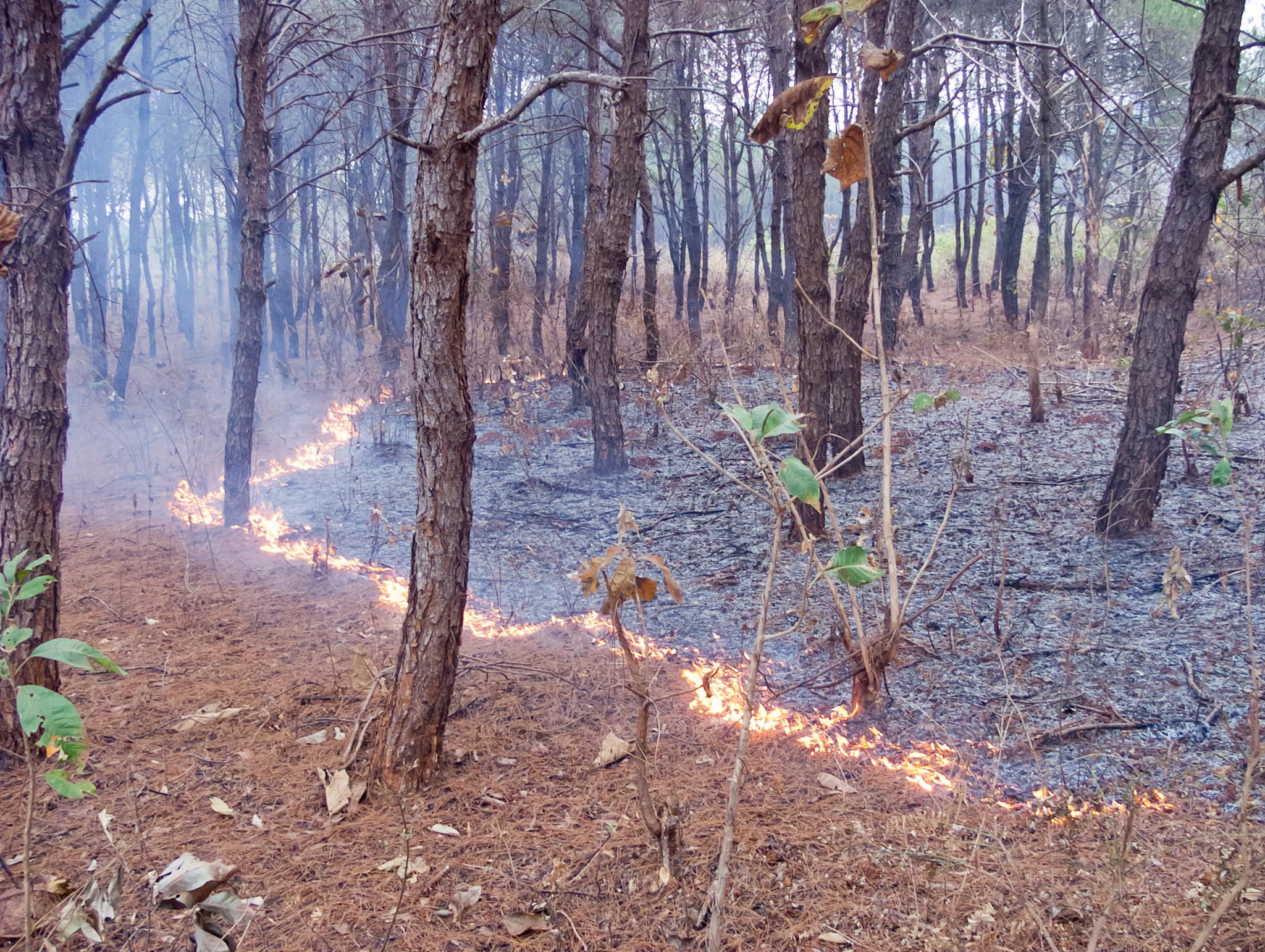
A forest fire in Shan State.

Environmental issues in Myanmar include air pollution, water pollution, deforestation, and issues relating to climate change. Myanmar is a country with a high percentage of forest covering and is said to have the most forest cover remaining in a Southeast Asia country. At the same time, it also has a rapid deforestation rate of over 2 percent of total forest area annually. Air pollution is another environmental concern for Myanmar. Data collected up to 2019 shows that 24,000 deaths of the annual toll of the country were caused by air pollution and particulate matter pollution in the country had caused moderate risks against human health. Myanmar people from both rural and urban areas face water pollution which is caused mainly by agriculture, mining activities and discharge of wastewater into water bodies without any treatment. Moreover, Myanmar has frequently experienced natural disasters that are the result of climate change. It also suffers from global warming, which results in temperature rising and drought.

== Deforestation ==
Myanmar is a country with beautiful landscapes and a wide diversity of ecosystems, such as tropical forests, dry forests, coral reefs, alpine grasslands, and several mountain ranges. Historically, forests covered 75 percent of the country's total area in 1948. However, this number had decreased by more than 40 percent over the years, to just about 44 percent of the country's area in 2015. The rate of deforestation surged suddenly from 0.25 percent before 1988 to 1.2 percent after 1988, when the country started promoting private commercial logging activities. Intact forest areas saw an annual loss rate of 0.94 percent between the period of 2002 and 2014. The country experienced a staggering amount of deforestation between 2010 and 2015, with the annual deforestation rate of the country as 2 percent of the country's total forest. From 1996 and 2016, the average loss rate of mangroves in the country is around 3.6 to 3.9 percent annually. With this rapid rate of forest loss, Myanmar was ranked globally as one of the top countries with the highest deforestation rate.

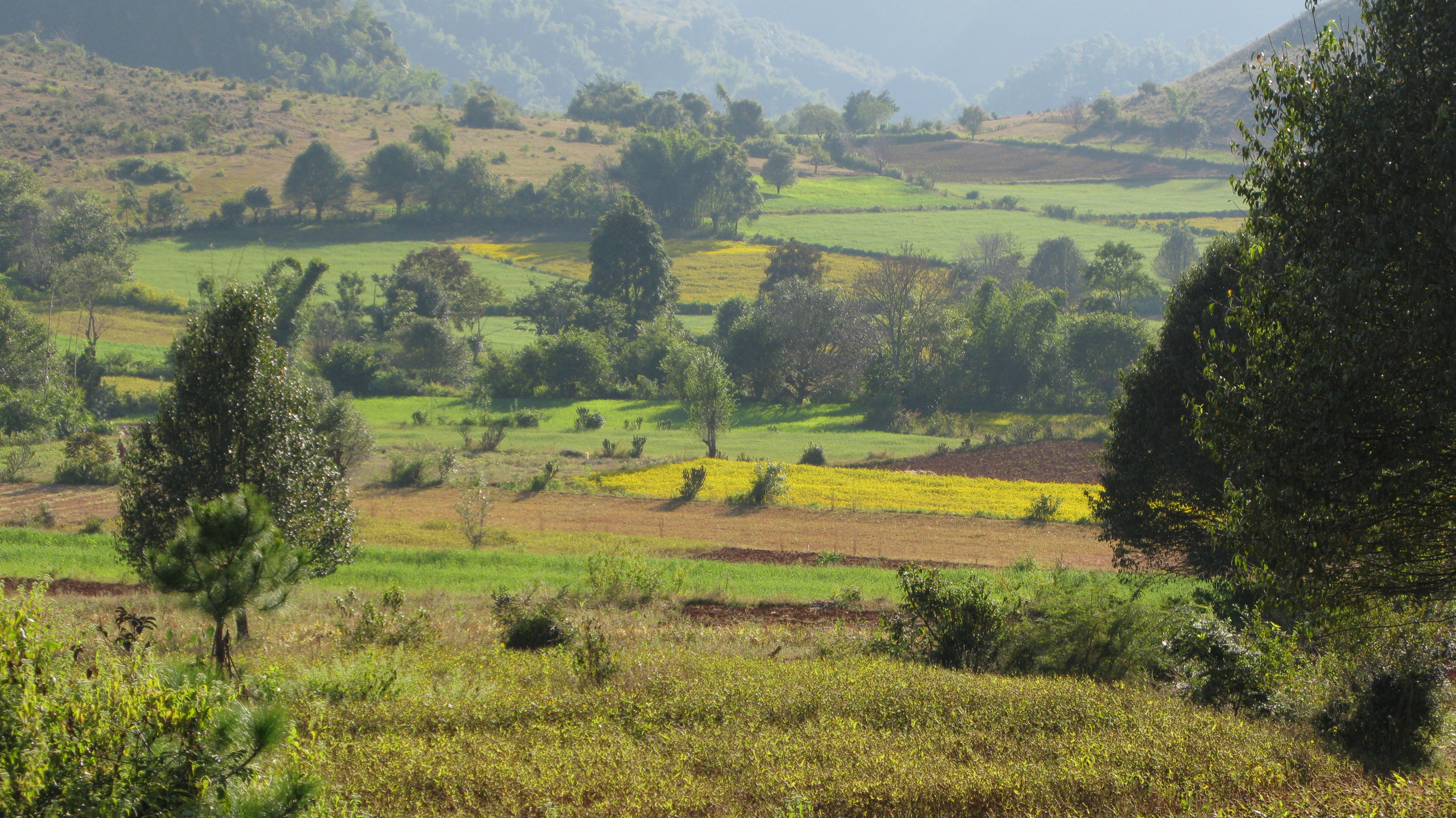
Green forest in remote locations of Myanmar

Certain regions of the country, such as Kachin, Sagaing, and Tanintharyi, remained more secluded and thus had more intact forests remaining. Nonetheless, the development of highways, constructions, and plantations has contributed significantly to the disturbance of the intact forest in those remote regions. For example, Chin, Kayin, and Shan states suffered a substantial loss in forest cover over the decades between 2001 and 2020. In particular, Shan state lost over 18,000 square kilometers of forest during this period. Intact forest loss is more prominent in Shan and Sagaing regions. On the other hand, mangrove losses differed from forest cover losses, with Rakhine State being the highest by losing 2,000 square kilometers in total. In some areas like Ayeyarwady Delta, the degradation rate may have decreased due to restoration projects. In 2014, forests still covered 63 percent of the country's land space. Therefore, the country was listed among the countries with the most forest covering in the region despite the rapid decline of intact forest cover and high deforestation rate.

Understanding the exact causes of deforestation and depletion of forestry resources has been a major dilemma in working out the solutions for deforestation in Myanmar. The use of forestry resources by rural communities has once been falsely claimed as the primary reason for deforestation because wood is used as the primary fuel for 95 percent of rural energy sources. The main reasons for deforestation in Myanmar include commercial timber production activities, commercial-scale plantations, mining, construction, and developments. Timber and wood products export is one of the major revenue sectors for the country, and this sector was worth 2.2 billion dollars in 2011. The development and expansion of large-scale plantations is one of the major contributors to deforestation. In these commercial plantations, commercial crops such as teak, palm oil, sugarcane, or rubber are usually grown. The expansion of these plantations has reduced the intact forest by more than 26% and affected the biodiversity and ecosystems of the forest destructively. Today, less than 27 percent of total forest area in Myanmar remains intact. Large amounts of the remaining forests are not protected by the law. Therefore, these forests are susceptible to easy exploitation of valuable timber and other natural forestry resources.

== Air pollution ==
In 2017, the air pollution in Myanmar was estimated to be the highest among Southeast Asia countries and is almost twice the average of other countries. From 1990 to 2017, the death tolls in Myanmar due to air pollution had overtaken other countries such as Cambodia and Laos, which had over 200 deaths per 100,000 population in 1990. Just in 2017, air pollution caused over 45,000 deaths in Myanmar. In 2019, 24,000 deaths were estimated to be caused by air pollution, surpassing recorded fatalities due to COVID-19 pandemic as of January 2021.

Particulate matter pollution is the main cause of air pollution in Myanmar, since it has caused over 10 percent of total deaths in the country. PM pollution has become one of the primary risk factors for children in Myanmar, particularly young children between the ages of 5 and 14 years. The measurements of PM 2.5 and PM 10 in major cities are found to be exceeding the WHO guidelines and standards. The amount of average PM 2.5 concentration in Myanmar over three decades was measured at 33 μg/m^{3}. This number means the PM 2.5 pollution in the country is under the acceptable limit with moderate risk to human health, particularly for people who have sensitive lungs or respiratory problems. In 2019, over 700,000 disability-adjusted life years (DALYS) were lost due to PM 2.5 pollution. The data collected in 2017 and 2018 shows that the particulate matter in the air is more significant during rush hours, which is contributed to by traffic and vehicle emissions.

However, the air quality did not improve during the country's pandemic lockdown in 2020 April. Further studies of air quality during 2017 and 2018 demonstrated that the main sources of air pollution were dust and secondary aerosols. Dust is the main pollutant of air pollution in Myanmar, coming from construction sites, vehicles on the roads, and agricultural dust. The second main pollutant was secondary aerosols, which are the result of chemical reactions of primary pollutant gases in the atmosphere.

Household air pollution is another major problem, as solid fuels, such as coals and wood, are the main energy source for cooking and heating in households. 81 percent of the urban population and 95 percent of the total population still depend on solid fuel as the fuel source. In 2017, household air pollution in Myanmar led to 7.6 percent of the total death toll and loss of over 900,000 disability-adjusted life years (DALYS).

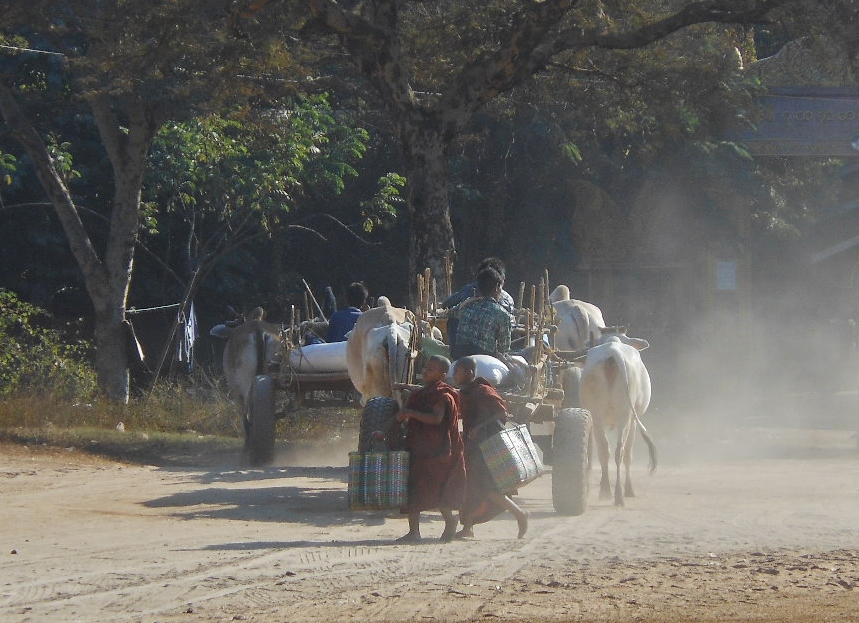
Dusty roads in Myanmar

The air quality in Yangon, the largest city in Myanmar, changes from season to season. There is a slight increase in particulate matter pollution during the rainy season. It increases noticeably when winter passes and reaches a peak in the middle of summer, during the February–March period in Myanmar. During summer and winter seasons, particulate matter pollution in the city is mainly due to the open burning of household waste and farm waste. Meanwhile, in the rainy season, vehicles are the primary sources of PM pollution in the city.

There are laws imposing fines and imprisonment for dumping or burning waste in places other than authorized by the local government committee, Yangon City Development Committee (YCDC). However, these laws are not strictly enforced and the general public lacks the awareness of public health impacts of air pollution. Thus, residents still practice biomass burning, the burning of harvest residues, and yard waste. Even when the waste is collected by the government, the methods of disposal include burning the waste or dumping it into the rivers because landfills are mostly at their full capacity and the waste management infrastructure is insufficient. This contributed to elevated levels of PM 2.5 pollution on winter mornings, when domestic waste and yard waste are usually burned among the city residents.

== Water pollution ==
Myanmar is rich in water resources and most of the freshwater resources come from the streams, river basins and lakes. There are four major rivers in Myanmar; Ayeyarwady, Sittaung, Thanlwin and Chindwin. Myanmar is an agricultural country and 70 percent of the nation's population is from the rural areas. So, the freshwater resources are mainly used by the agricultural sector while small quantities are being used for domestic, industrial, and other purposes. The top contributors that cause water pollution in Myanmar are agriculture, industrial and mining activities, and urban wastewater discharge.

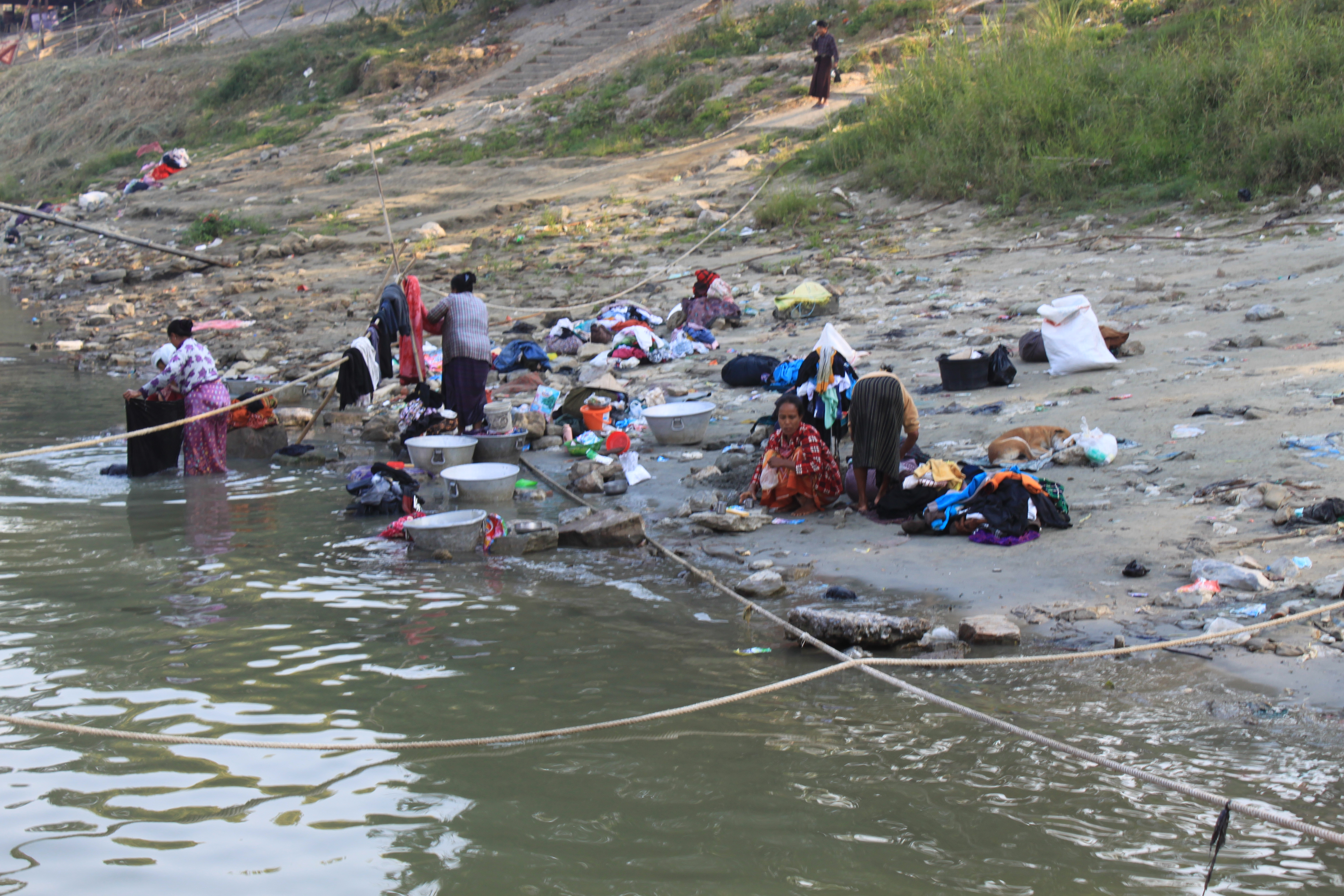
People in Sagaing region relying on Ayeyarwady river for domestic use

Agriculture can cause water pollution in Myanmar through agricultural runoff. When it rains, there is excess water on the land that goes underground and flows to the water resources on the land, such as rivers and lakes, and along the way, it carries the fertilizers from farming practices in the soil, as well as debris on the ground. This phenomenon is a part of the water cycle known as runoff. Since Myanmar is an agricultural country, the use of fertilizers in the agricultural industry enters the water resources by runoff and causes eutrophication since the fertilizers are rich in nutrients.

As mineral resources in Myanmar are abundant, the mining activities are performed by companies legally and illegally. According to Kachin News Group, a villager from Nam San village, Kachin State reported that after the military coup in Myanmar in February 2021, the large-scale mining activities have performed more and more near the village. As a result, the color of their water resources has changed and people no longer have a chance to get clean water. In 2020, there were only 70 mining rigs on the Ayeyarwady river in Myitkyina city, Kachin State and the number surged to more than 1000 in 2021, and further increased more 800 in 2022. The heavy machinery used in gold mining causes severe environmental and ecosystem destruction. Moreover, harmful chemicals from gold mining, such as mercury and sulfuric acid, enter the river and cause water pollution and destroy aquatic ecosystems.

Myanmar is a developing country, and like other countries, it is undergoing rapid urbanization, particularly in big cities such as Mandalay and Yangon. This has made it challenging to provide enough infrastructure for waste management systems. As a result, people dump the trash and waste in the streets and open spaces. The stormwater runoff carries oil, heavy metals, and waste from the surface to the water bodies and affects the water quality. Furthermore, industries in urban areas often release pollutants into nearby water bodies. The pollutants include chemicals, toxins, and heavy metals which can contaminate water. These practices are significant contributors to water pollution in urban areas, making it difficult for residents to access clean freshwater from natural water sources.

Water pollution is related to our health problems such as diarrhea and typhoid which are the result of drinking water that contains pathogens and bacteria. Clean water is vital for public health, but in some areas, the contaminants in water bodies are higher, and the public cannot use the domestic water for drinking. According to research by the Occupational and Environmental Health Division (OEHD) under the Ministry Health and Sports, released in 2018, in Ayeyarwady region, more than 29 percent of domestic water resources had arsenic level greater than 10 ppm, the standard set by World Health Organization (WHO) while 8 percent is greater than 50 ppm (National Water Quality Standard).

== Climate change ==
Myanmar is located in Southeast Asia and has a tropical climate. It has three seasons: summer, rainy season, and winter. The country is also divided into three geographical zones: the Dry Zone, the coastal zone, and the hilly zone. The climate change in Myanmar is influenced by its geographical location. The central part of the country constitutes a dry zone, and a chance of drought occurring is high due to its minimal annual rainfall, ranging between 500–1000 mm per year. In contrast, the southern and western regions that form the coastal zone are facing the threats of cyclones, particularly during the monsoon season. The hilly region, located in the northern and eastern parts of the country, experiences lower temperatures compared to other zones.

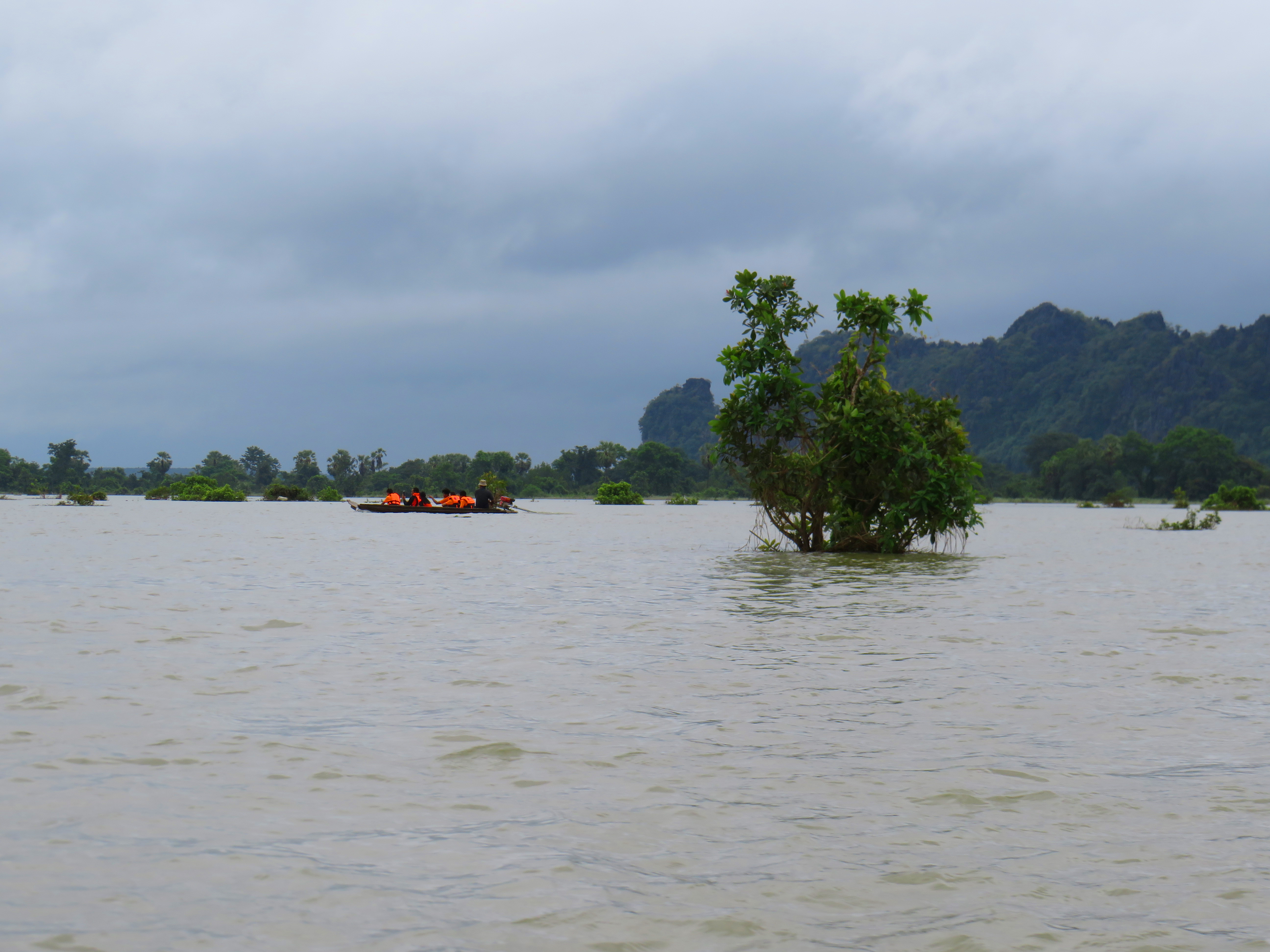
Flood in Myanmar

Due to the consequences of climate change, Myanmar is grappling with extreme weather effects and natural disasters. In 2008, cyclone Nargis hit the country, resulting in a death toll of 140,000. Furthermore, the nation suffered from widespread flooding in 2015, especially in Chin, Rakhine, Sagaing, and Magway regions. According to the International Organization for Migration (IOM) Myanmar, this flood affected 5.4 million people, with 1.6 million being displaced. Additionally, 476,000 houses were destroyed or damaged, and 847,471 acres of farmland were adversely affected. These natural disasters have significant repercussions on the country's gross domestic product (GDP), consuming 3 percent of the annual GDP. Due to the data from the United Nations Development Programme (UNDP), in 2019, the rainy season brought extreme flooding and over 190,000 asked to seek emergency shelter.

In addition to natural disasters, Myanmar is also encountering rising temperatures. The average annual temperatures in Myanmar have been rising for several decades and are expected to continue increasing in the foreseeable future. According to the data from Climate Knowledge Portal, in 1901, the annual average mean surface air temperature was 23.53 °C and it rose to 24.11 °C in 2021. The data from weather stations across the country spanning from 1980 to 2010 indicates that the national daily average temperature has increased by 0.35 °C per decade in inland regions and 0.14 °C per decade in coastal regions. Since inland regions have warmed slightly more, the national daily maximum temperature has surged by 0.57 °C per decade in inland regions, compared to 0.23 °C per decade in coastal regions. Consequently, some inland regions are confronted with drought conditions during summer. Climate change is greatly impacting the lives of the Myanmar people and the country's development, and it is one of the reasons for the country's poverty. To reduce the risks from climate change, Myanmar signed the Paris Climate Agreement in 2016.
