= Learning alliance =

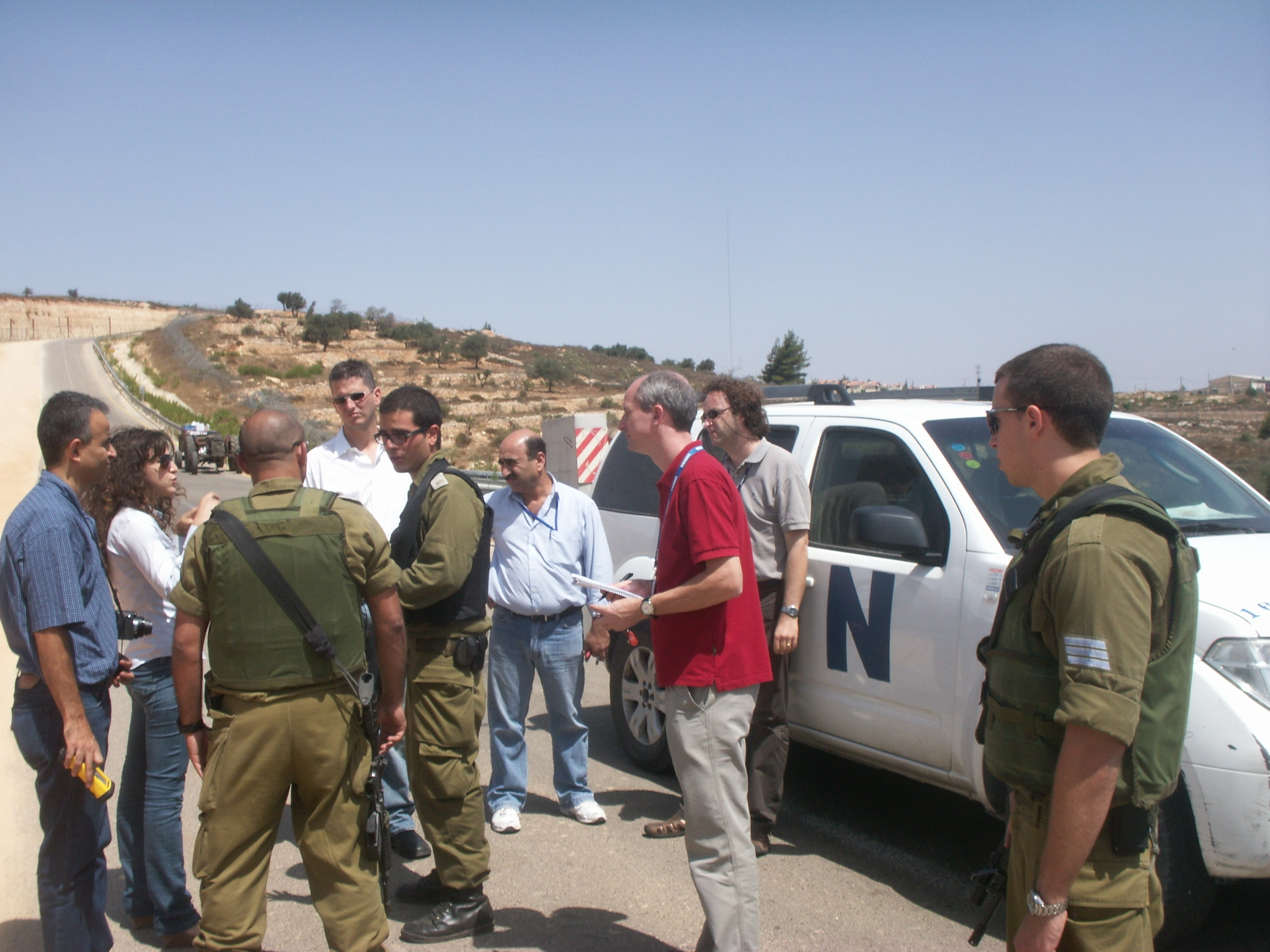
The learning alliance Academic Cooperation Palestine Project (ACPP) hosts research partnerships around sensitive issues related to the Israeli Separation Wall.

A learning alliance is a diverse network of individuals committed to improving knowledge on a specific research topic. Learning alliances are often made up of small networks of public, private and/or civil society actors seeking to further social or political change.

== Learning alliance structure ==
Learning alliances consist of a series of facilitated meetings or informal exchanges between stakeholders with a common advocacy interest. Individual actors or groups share knowledge on a topic in order to improve the validity, accuracy and dissemination of their analysis.

== In the humanitarian sector ==
Learning Alliances in the humanitarian sector often place importance on improving the capacity of disadvantaged social groups to solve problems on their own behalf. The learning alliance concept has ties to the field of Participatory Action Research, or PAR, an approach to social research that emphasizes participation and action by community members.

In humanitarian, development and social research fields, the term Learning Alliance has been used by international aid groups to describe cross-boundary stakeholder networks focused on improving local civil society capacity.

== Academic literature ==
The Learning Alliance approach was first discussed in literature in 1994 investigating what Michael Gibbons called mode two knowledge production. Mode two knowledge production involves multidisciplinary teams that work together on specific problems in the real world, in contrast to mode one knowledge production, “which is motivated by scientific knowledge alone... and which is not bothered by the applicability of its findings”. Gibbons noted that this type of research “promotes the interaction of multiple actors with multi-layered sources of knowledge to cope with the complexity of fostering continuous technological, social and institutional innovations to respond to rapidly changing contexts and demands”.

== Examples of learning alliances ==
In 2012 the United Nations Barrier Monitoring Unit (BMU) launched a formal Learning Alliance called the Academic Cooperation Palestine Project (ACPP) to enhance the educational and technical capacity of Palestinian researchers. ACPP hosted local and international research partnerships around sensitive issues related to the Israeli Separation Wall, including land degradation, water rights and land title controls. ACPP is now called the WALL Learning Alliance.

In the United States, the Digital Learning Alliance group formed to “improve economic growth in underserved areas of the U.S. by advocating for personalized education through the use of digital learning technologies”.

The Learning Alliance, started in 2009 in the United States, was organized to further literacy among school children. In Indian River County, Florida, the Alliance worked with parents, community leaders, educators, and concerned citizens to achieve 90 percent literacy by third grade by 2018. In 2017, through professional development opportunities, book drives, and after school and summer programs, literacy had increased to 56 percent. Following a learning alliance structure, the group meets monthly.

LearningAlliance.ch was subsequently established as an NGO in Geneva by Stefan G. Ziegler in 2014 and five more learning alliances were subsequently established by the NGO.

== Learning Alliance - International Law for Youth (LAILY) ==
LAILY is a unique educational initiative that stands as the sole learning alliance dedicated to international law for youth applying documentary film. Established by Stefan Ziegler, LAILY strives to share knowledge on international law within the context of conflict situations to secondary school students globally. The initiative employs a dynamic bottom-up approach, actively involving local actors and interest groups in participative learning cycles and the exchange of knowledge among peers. LAILY fosters synergies among diverse stakeholders, including civic organizations, teachers, international law societies, academics, and donors. At the heart of LAILY's mission is the groundbreaking educational documentary film "Broken-for-the-Curious," produced by AdvocacyProductions Sàrl. Tailored for young individuals aged 14 and above, the film aims to stimulate curiosity and critical thinking about the causes of armed conflict, the perceived shortcomings of International Law, and the transformative journey from law to justice.
