= Mangrove deforestation in Myanmar =

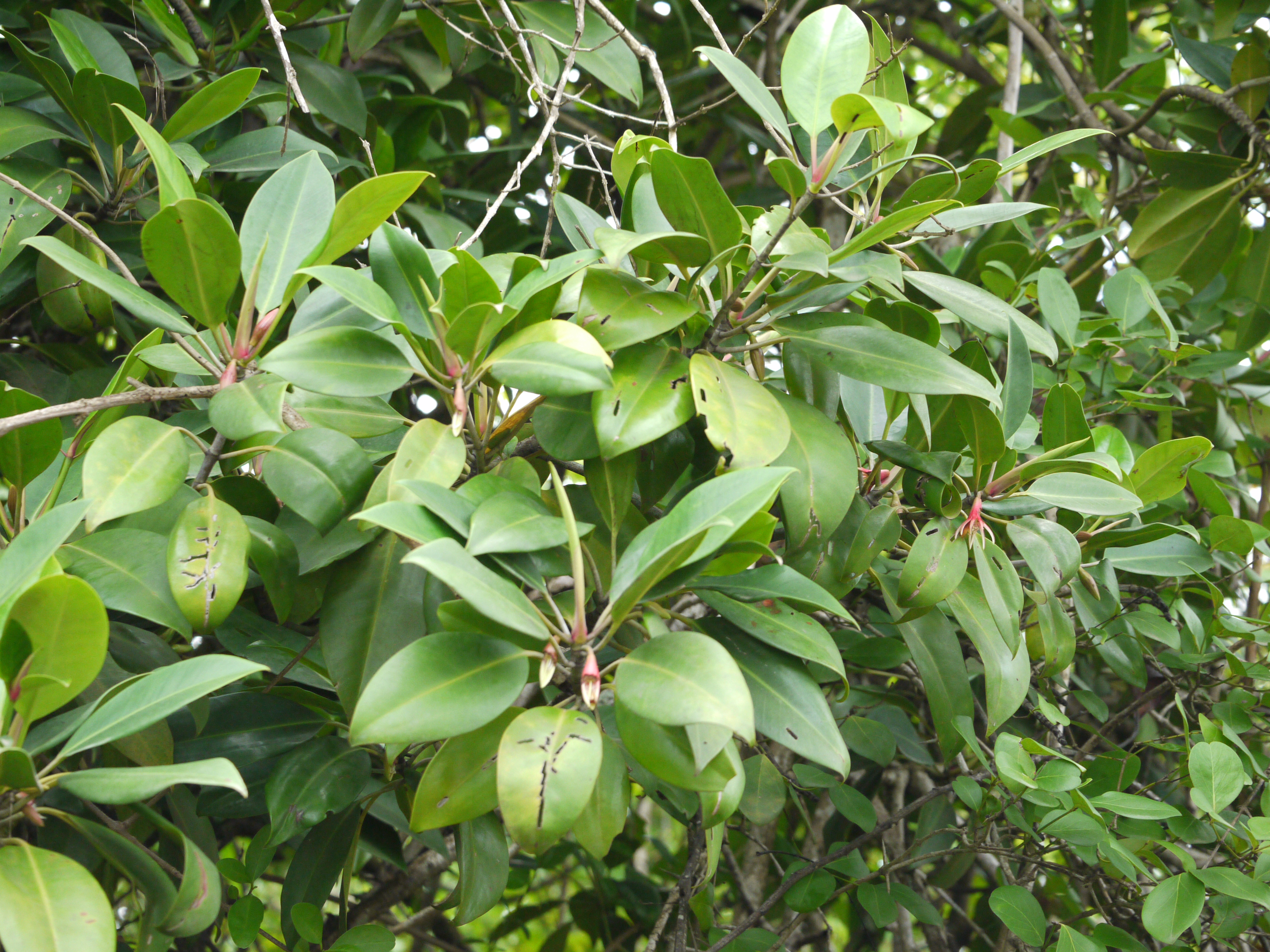
Mangroves in Myanmar

Mangrove deforestation in Myanmar is usually for commercial uses or resources extraction, and is occurring mainly in 3 different regions: Rakhine State, Ayeyarwady Mega Delta, and Tanintharyi Division. While large areas of mangrove forests remain, the deforestation rates of these forests have been increasing due to anthropogenic influences such as economic pressures to overexploit and expand the aquaculture and agricultural industry. There are also natural threats that contribute to mangrove deforestation such as soil erosion. There has been recent increased attention to conserve and restore these forests through rehabilitation projects and policies.

These mangrove forests are important to the country’s economy, climate and biodiversity. The Burmese people, especially the rural communities are heavily dependent on the resources from the mangrove forests for a living. Mangrove forests also help ameliorate negative impacts from natural disasters and are home to many different types of flora and fauna that thrive specifically in these ecosystems.

== History of deforestation ==
Myanmar Map

Mangroves used to be more common but currently mainly grow in 3 different regions: Rakhine State, Ayeyarwaddy Mega Delta, and Tanintharyi Division. The mangrove forests in the Ayeyarwaddy Mega Delta are the largest but are also the most affected by human actions.

The annual rate of deforestation between 1975-2005 was highest in Myanmar in the Southeast Asian region. Some researchers determined that between 2000 and 2012, forests were deforested at a rate of 0.18% a year, which is about 250,000 acres of land. Remote sensing was used to detect deforestation of mangrove forests in Myanmar because it was hard for international research communities to do field studies in Myanmar. Remote sensing showed that deforestation was occurring at a faster rate than regrowth can occur.

== Drivers of deforestation ==
Large areas of mangrove forests are cleared to plant rice fields, expand aquaculture, or to collect palm oil. Aquaculture was previously thought to be the only big contributor of mangrove change but it only accounted for 30% of mangrove deforestation with rice and agriculture contributing 38% together. A Balmford et al. study showed that many countries convert mangrove forests to aquaculture when the economic value of mangrove forests is usually higher than the economic value of shrimp farming. Thus the study suggested that it is more cost effective for countries to preserve their mangrove forests.

Other reasons for deforestation are urban development, mining, salt pan development and overexploitation of resources. Natural threats to mangrove forests include erosion, land loss, inundation, sea flooding, upstream movement of the saline/freshwater front, and seawater intrusion into freshwater lenses. Studies show that the biodiversity and area of mangrove forests declined after Cyclone Nargis hit Myanmar in 2008.

== Importance of mangrove forests ==
Mangrove forests play a major role in Myanmar’s economy since it provides natural resources for both personal and commercial uses. Poorer rural communities that have settled near the mangrove regions are particularly dependent on these ecosystems for resources and sources of income. Thus a depletion of mangrove forests will harm the poorer rural communities the most economically.

Mangrove forests also ameliorate the negative impacts of natural disasters such as cyclones and storms by stabilizing shorelines. Research shows that if there were less deforestation of mangroves, the death toll would have been lower when Cyclone Nargis hit Myanmar in 2008.

Mangrove forests also provide other climate benefits. They create protected zones where young fish and other marine life can grow and thrive. They also protect coastal communities from flooding during storm surges. Mangrove forests also greatly contribute to ameliorating global warming because they are carbon dense and they recycle greenhouse gases such as carbon dioxide into oxygen, which is beneficial for humans and other living creatures.

== Conservation policies ==
In the 1800s, 9 policies were specifically written for forest management in Myanmar. In 1856, the 1st of the 11 forest laws and rules was enacted by the British colonial administration. Then in 1956, Burma decreed two amendments that expanded the scope of the Forest Act. Myanmar’s protected area system, under which 19 pieces of legislation was developed to protect parks and forests, emerged as an extension of forest law about 150 years ago. This law initially categorized forests as protected or reserved for timber extraction. Later, the forest department gained responsibility of managing forests and wildlife under the Burma Forest Act of 1902.

The World Bank’s assessment in 1992 on Myanmar’s conservation was unsatisfactory in comprehensiveness and enforcement so some of the deficiencies were discussed in the 1994 Protection of Wild Life and Wild Plants and Conservation of Natural Areas Law. The law does not clearly address specific measures that are required to prevent illegal logging, encroachment, extraction of forest products and wildlife poaching in the protected areas. The specific responsibilities of the people with executive power are also not well defined. Under the current legislations, mangrove forests are classified either as “Primary” or “Secondary”. Mangrove forests that are classified as “secondary” can be converted for aquaculture uses.

== Rehabilitation projects ==
Depending on the case, a deforested mangrove region can be restored. Most mangrove forests that have been converted to agricultural zones can be reforested. Some mangrove forest regions that were converted to aquacultural zones can also be restored however most that have been converted for industrial plantations and later abandoned are very difficult to restore because they are highly polluted and have a high concentration of pesticides in the soil. Mangrove areas that have been converted to urban areas are also difficult to restore. In order to restore deforested areas, detailed planning is needed to enrich the soils and remove toxic material.

Research has indicated that each rehabilitation project should be different depending on each region's specific environmental status. Studies have shown that understanding the trajectories of each mangrove species in relation to population sizes is important in the restoration of mangrove forests after cyclone disturbance. A stage-structured model showed that sites dominated by species such as A. officinalis, B. sexangula, E. agallocha and S. caseolaris have a high potential for recovery whereas sites dominated by H. fomes and R. apiculata have a lower potential for recovery because of delayed reproduction due to the disturbance. Fujioka et al. did a research study, which showed that mangrove communities could recover quickly after tsunami impacts but have a more difficult time recovering in highly disturbed areas where sand has accumulated and the composition of the sediments has greatly altered. Baldwin et al. and Moore et al. both performed studies which showed that mangrove forests are generally resilient and readily reestablish after natural short-term impacts such as hurricanes through seedling recruitment or epicormic sprouting by local species if there are no further natural or anthropogenic disturbances.
