= Myanmar Rice Federation =

Burmese national industry organisation

- မြန်မာနိုင်ငံ ဆန်စပါးအသင်းချုပ်
- Abbreviation: MRF
- Predecessor: Myanmar Rice Industry Association MIRA
- Formation: 2012
- Headquarters: Lanmadaw Township, Yangon, Myanmar
- Executive Chairman: Chit Khine
- Website: myanmarricefederation.org

The Myanmar Rice Federation (Burmese: မြန်မာနိုင်ငံ ဆန်စပါးအသင်းချုပ်) is Burma's national organisation for the rice industry, responsible for negotiating rice export deals with neighbouring countries, including China and India.

== History ==
Myanmar Rice Federation was formed in 2012 as a successor to the Myanmar Rice Industry Association (MIRA).

In July 2017, the MRF partnered with the Chinese group CITIC to conduct a feasibility study regarding the implementation of 33 agricultural business centres in Myanmar. In September 2017, the organization's website was briefly hacked as a protest to the Rohingya conflict.

Between 2010 and 2012, Myanmar rice exports to China grew from very little to 752,000 tonnes. In 2014, the two country signed their first legal agreement to organize their rice trade.

In March 2015, the MRF was criticized for its limited shortlist of rice producers allowed to export rice to China. In early August 2015, the MRF announced the halt of rice exports for a month and a half due to the heavy flood affecting the country. In April 2016, the MRF urged the new Myanmar government to privatize the Myanmar Agricultural Development Bank to increase its loan capacity.

Myanmar Rice Federation organized the MRF Stakeholder Forum 2018, held in Naypyidaw on 7 March 2018. The MRF Forum was officiated and graced by Myanmar's State Counselor Aung San Suu Kyi. The MRF announced the Floor Rice for paddy in the interest of small-holder farmers.

== Description ==
MRF is responsible for negotiating rice export deals with neighbouring countries, including China and India. Myanmar exports more than 1 million tonnes of rice to 50 countries, and 70% of its exports go to China (numbers April 2016-January 2017).

MRF's executive committee is chaired by Chit Khaing.
