= Zaw =

Zaw (Burmese: ဇော်) is a Burmese name that may refer to

- Adrian Zaw (born 1984), Burmese-born American actor
- Aung Zaw (footballer) (born 1990), Burmese football defender
- Aung Zaw (editor) (born ca. 1968), Burmese journalist and editor
- Ba Zaw (1891–1942), Burmese artist
- Hein Thiha Zaw (born 1995), Burmese football defender
- Kyaw Zaw (1919–2012), one of the founders of the modern Burmese Army
- Myint Zaw (fl. 2010s), Burmese journalist and activist
- Myo Min Zaw (fl. 1990s–2010s), Burmese democracy activist
- Myo Zaw Aung (born 1980), Burmese Member of Parliament
- Myo Zaw Oo (born 1992), Burmese football midfielder
- Ni Ni Khin Zaw (born 1991), Burmese pop singer
- Phone Zaw Han (fl. 2000s–2010s), Burmese city mayor
- Pyae Phyo Zaw (born 1994), Brumese football defender
- Thein Zaw (born 1994), Burmese football defender
- Thiha Zaw (born 1993), Burmese football midfielder
- Win Zaw Oo (born 1977), tallest person in Burma
- Win Zaw (born 1982) is a Burmese House of Nationalities MP
- Ye Zaw Htet Aung (born 1991), Burmese football defender
- Zaw Htet Ko Ko (born 1981), Burmese political activist
- Zaw Lin (born 1992), Burmese football midfielder
- Zaw Linn Tun (born 1983), Burmese football defender
- Zaw Min (minister) (born 1951), Minister for Electric Power of Myanmar
- Zaw Min (politician, born 1949), Burmese House of Nationalities MP
- Zaw Min Tun (born 1992), Burmese football defender
- Zaw Moe (born 1967), Burmese golfer
- Zaw Myint Maung (born 1951), Burmese politician
- Zaw One (1945–2009), Burmese actor and singer
- Zaw Win (footballer) (born 1994), Burmese footballer
- Zaw Win Htut (born 1964), Burmese hard rock singer
- Zaw Win Thet (born 1991), Burmese sprint runner
- Zaw Zaw (born 1967), Burmese business tycoon
- Zaw Zaw Aung (born 1971), Burmese artist
- Zaw Zaw Aung (writer) (1937–2016), Burmese author, critic and public intellectual
- Zaw Zaw Oo (born 1989), Burmese football defender

== See also ==
- Zaw., taxonomic author abbreviation for Aleksander Zawadzki (naturalist) (1798–1868), Polish naturalist
- Zeitschrift für die Alttestamentliche Wissenschaft, a German academic journal
- Zambia Alliance of Women, Zambian women's organization
