= Kanmaw =

Kanmaw may refer to:

- Kanmaw Kyun, also known as Kanmaw Island, an island in the Mergui Archipelago
- Kanmaw To
- wnship, a township of Myeik District in the Taninthayi Division of Burma
- Kyunsu, better known as Kanmaw, a small town on the island of Kanmaw Kyun in the Mergui Archipelago of southeastern Burma
