= Kanmaw Kyun =

Island in Myanmar

Coordinates: 11°40′N 98°28′E

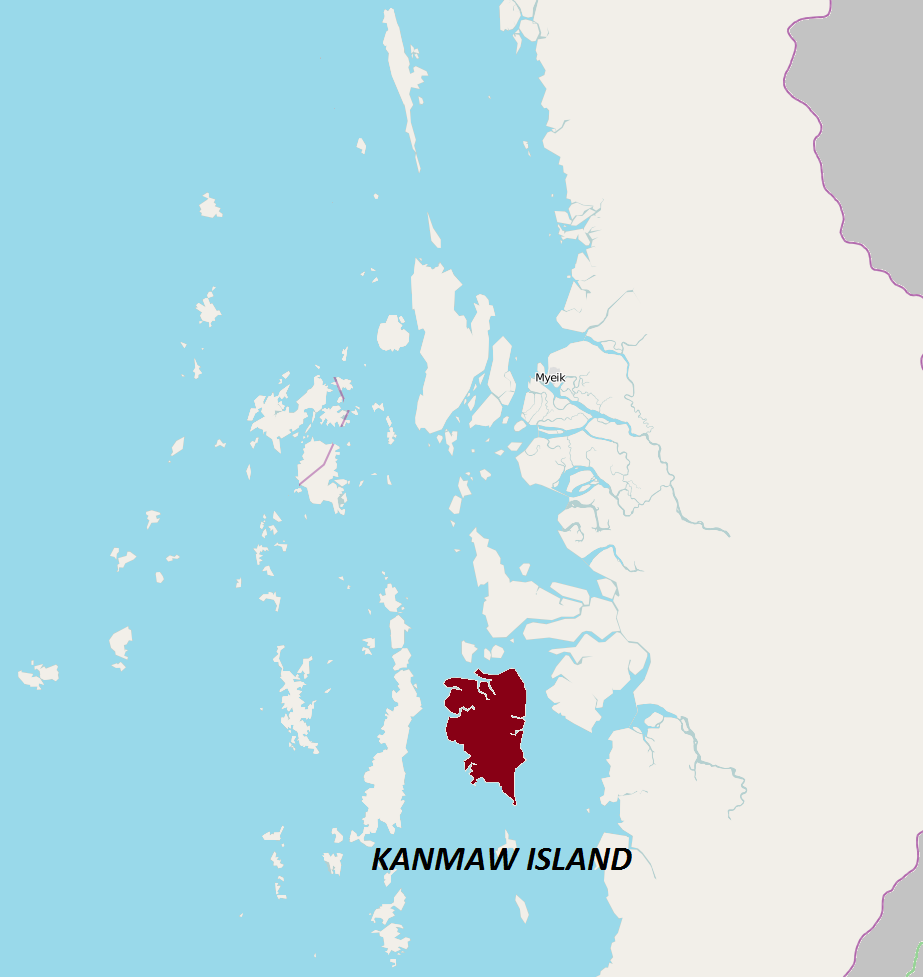
Location in the Mergui Archipelago

Kanmaw Kyun or Kanmaw Island is an island in the Andaman Sea along the coast of southeastern Burma (Myanmar), and is part of the Mergui Archipelago. Administratively, it is located in Kyunsu Township, Myeik District, in the Taninthayi Region. On the northeastern side of the island is the town of Kyunsu, which is the administrative seat for the township. The island covers a total area of 409 square kilometres (158 sq mi).

== Etymology ==
Under the British, the island was known as Kisseraing Island, Kithareng or Ketthayin. After the June 1989 "Adaptation of Expressions Law" the island's name was changed to Kanmaw, named after the town of Kanmaw on the northeastern coast, which is now called Kyunsu.

== Geography ==
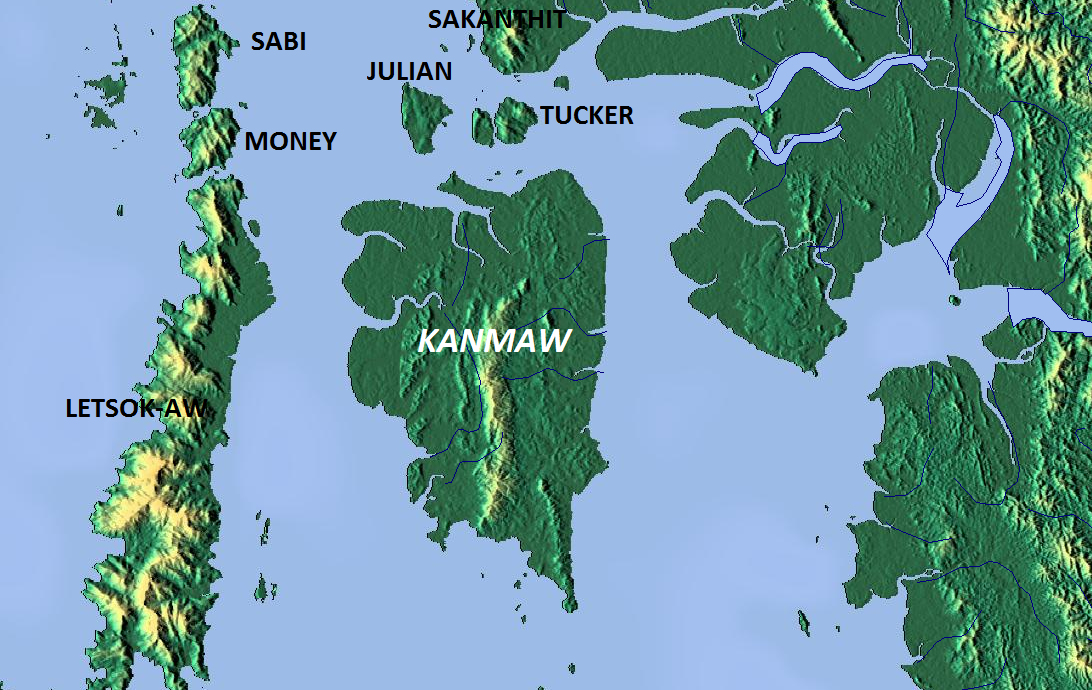
Relief map of Kanmaw and surrounding islands

Kanmaw is located in the Andaman Sea in the east central Mergui Archipelago. Kanmaw is surrounded by other islands of the archipelago. This includes the elongated Letsok-aw Island to the west, and Money Island and Sabi Island above that, Julian Island and Tucker Island and Sakanthit Island further to the north and larger islands to the east, Medaw and the larger Singu Island. Kanmaw, covering about 409 km^{2} (158 sq mi), with a coastline of 130.4 km (81.0 mi) in the Mergui Archipelago is almost densely forested with tropical rain forest and dry deciduous forests and a number of short rivers raising in the forested hills. It has sandy beaches and coral reefs along its coastline.

The larger villages on Kanmaw aside from the main town of Kyunsu are Bemagyauk Ywa, Thechaung and Mawngaungdon Ywa on its east coast and Yedwindaung Ywa on its west coast with Sidongyaung in the mid-west to the northeast of Yedwinfaung Ywa.

== Economy ==
The economy of the Kanmaw is dependent on rubber plantations. To improve the economic conditions, village roads are being built in the island. A shrimp farming project was also launched in May 2001 said to be the largest foreign investment project in the livestock-breeding sector.
