= ZAW (disambiguation) =

ZAW is a German academic journal about the Hebrew Bible.

ZAW or zaw can also refer to:

- Mitla Zapotec, a language of Oaxaca state, Mexico, by ISO 639 code
- Zaw, a Burmese name
- Aleksander Zawadzki (naturalist), a Polish naturalist, whose taxonomic abbreviation is Zaw.
- Zawia VOR-DME, a radio beacon located near Zuwarah Airport, near Zuwarah, Libya
- Zambia Alliance of Women, an organization for women from Zambia
- Zoom Airways, an airline from Bangladesh, by ICAO code
