= Zaw Min =

Zaw Min is a Burmese name and may refer to:

- Zaw Min (minister), former Minister for Electric Power-1 of Myanmar and a retired Colonel
- Zaw Min (MP), Burmese politician currently serving as a House of Nationalities MP

== See also ==
- Zaw Min Tun (footballer), (born 1992), Burmese footballer
- Zaw Min Tun (general), Burmese army general and military spokesperson
