= Vikrom Aisiri =

Thai businessman and politician

Vikrom Aisiri is a Thai businessman and politician. Aisiri is the Thai senator from Ranong province. His business holdings include the VES Group, Phuket Airlines, Andaman Club, a casino cum golf resort on Thahtay Kyun Island in Burma and Dusit Island Resort in Chiang Rai. A publicity shy millionaire with a family business background in construction, Aisiri built his personal fortune as Chairman of the VES Group. VES is a major investor in Burma with interests in its main industries of logging, gem mining, pearl farming, commercial fishing and tourism. The group is also rumored to be building a four star hotel in Ranong for overnight stay of tourists on their way to the Andaman Club. He is also known for his close ties with the State Peace and Development Council, the ruling military junta in Burma. Aisiri is also reported to be one of the promoters of Timor Air.

He is the owner of the legendary Norwegian coastal steamer "Kong Olav" named after King Olav V, and has become very unpopular in Norway after refusing to sell the ship back to its original country to become a veteran/museum ship. Aisiri's eccentric antics reportedly made rescue of the derelict ship impossible, and it is now in a state of disrepair.

He is a recipient of the Knight Grand Cross (First Class) of the Most Noble Order of the Crown of Thailand. He is a commerce graduate of Chulalongkorn University.
