= Phuket Air =

Airline based in Bangkok, Thailand

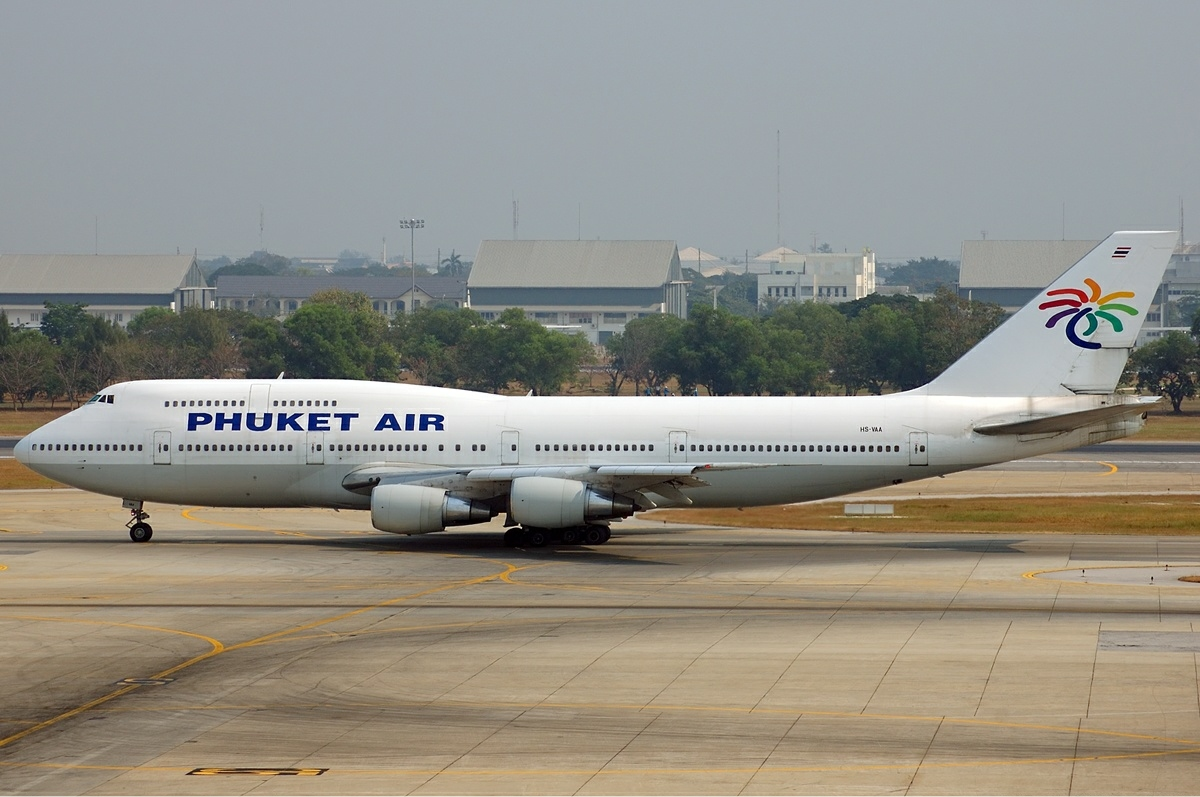
- Phuket Air Boeing 747
IATA	ICAO	Call sign
- formerly 9R	VAP	PHUKET AIR
- Founded: 1999
- Commenced operations: 19 December 2001
- Ceased operations: 2012
- Hubs: Bangkok–Suvarnabhumi; Phuket
- Fleet size: 2
- Headquarters: Bangkok, Thailand
- Key people: Vikrom Aisiri and Angkana Apiwattanaporn, Owners
- Website: http://www.phuketairlines.com

Phuket Air (Phuket Airlines Co. Ltd) was an airline based in Bangkok, Thailand. The airline specialised in leasing its fleet of Boeing 747 and 737 aircraft on an ACMI (Aircraft, Crews, Maintenance, Insurance) as well as wet lease basis to airlines worldwide needing extra passenger capacity. Other services provided included international charter services, ad hoc wet leasing services, religious pilgrimage charters (Hajj/Umrah) and dry lease services. Saudi Arabian Airlines was a major long term client of Phuket Air. In the past, the airline provided scheduled domestic and international air services. Its main base was at Suvarnabhumi Airport, Bangkok, with a hub at Phuket International Airport, Phuket. The airline was an international scheduled carrier before it shifted its focus to the ACMI/wet lease market.

== History ==
The airline was established in 1999 and started operations on December 19, 2001 with two Boeing 737-200 aircraft. It was owned and operated by Vikrom Aisiri and his wife Angkana Apiwattanaporn. Aisiri is a Thai businessman and senator from Ranong who also owns the Andaman Club Hotel & Casino in Myanmar and a Dusit Island resort hotel in Chiang Rai Province. Phuket Air flew domestic routes to Phuket, Chiang Mai, Krabi, Chiang Rai, Hat Yai, Ranong and Mae Sot. Ranong operations were used by tourists visiting the Andaman Club Hotel & Casino, across the border in Myanmar.

The airline rapidly expanded, adding Boeing 747-200, Boeing 747-300, NAMC YS-11 turbo-prop and Boeing 757-200 aircraft to its fleet. In addition to flying several domestic routes, Phuket Air undertook international routes to London, Paris, Amsterdam, Dubai, Dhaka, Chittagong, Yangon and Incheon. The airline also operated charter flights to Bangkok and Phuket for tour operators from Kuala Lumpur, Hong Kong, Shanghai, Singapore, Taipei, Jakarta and Manila. Phuket Air also operated Hajj and Umrah charter flights to Jeddah from Indonesia, the Philippines and Bangladesh. It also operated charter flights from Japan to Kuwait for the Japanese Iraq Reconstruction and Support Group.

Under strain from a downturn in the tourism industry after the 2004 Indian Ocean earthquake, and struggling to maintain its fleet of ageing aircraft, Phuket Airlines was plagued by poor service and safety concerns. The European Union blacklisted the airline, banning it from flying to Europe. By the end of 2005, Phuket Air had scaled back its operations, laid off hundreds of its employees and decided to concentrate on leasing its aircraft to other carriers. Domestic services ceased on 12 September 2005.

In the 2005-2006 Hajj season, Phuket Airlines provided Boeing 747-200 and 747-300 aircraft on a short term wet lease to Saudi Arabian Airlines. The carrier commissioned Air France Industries, the aircraft maintenance-service arm of the French flag carrier, to help lift Phuket Airlines' safety standards which was successful in lifting the EU ban. In late 2006-07, the airline flew charters for the Saudi Arabia Ministry of the Interior flying out deportees. On 6 March 2007, the European Commission, the EU's executive arm, removed Phuket Air from its list of blacklisted airlines after Phuket Air complied with stringent safety audits and inspections. Phuket Air was one of the first few airlines to achieve this. In October 2007, Phuket Airlines resumed operations and provided three Boeing 747-200/-300 aircraft to Saudi Arabian Airlines on a short term ACMI/wet lease contract for the Hajj charters.

== Destinations ==
In May 2005 Phuket Air was banned from flying into the European Union, such flights to London and Amsterdam were suspended. The airline was later removed from the blacklist after complying with safety audits. As of February 2006, Phuket Air maintained one domestic route between Bangkok and Ranong and an international tour-package flight from Bangkok to Yangon, Myanmar. Phuket Air also operated to Chittagong, Bangladesh. In 2006 Phuket Air ceased all scheduled flights in and out of Thailand. The airline then went on to focus on ACMI leasing, which the carrier operating for Saudi Arabian Airlines on selected Hajj services. Phuket Air was successful in its bid to lease its Boeing 747-300 aircraft to Saudi Arabian Airlines. In 2010, Phuket Air transitioned to Boeing 747-400 aircraft under a new contract with Saudi Arabian Airlines. Phuket Air ceased trading in 2012, and much of its fleet was scrapped by 2018.

== Fleet ==
Phuket Air did not have an active fleet at April 2013:

Past aircraft operated by Phuket Air

- Boeing 737-200
- Boeing 747-200
- Boeing 747-300
- Boeing 747-400
- Boeing 757-200
- NAMC YS-11
