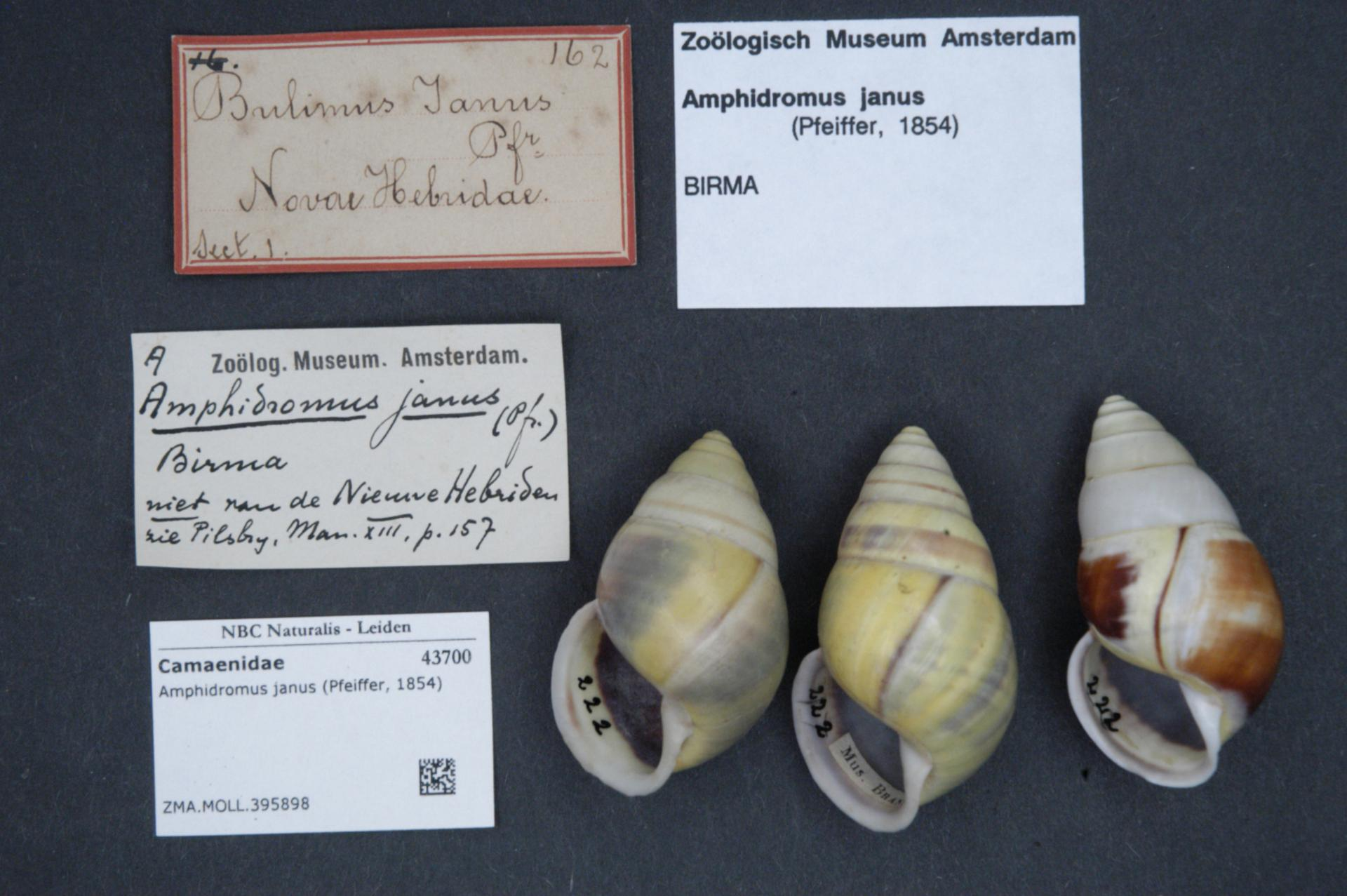
- specimen of Amphidromus janus

Scientific classification
- Kingdom: Animalia
- Phylum: Mollusca
- Class: Gastropoda
- Order: Stylommatophora
- Family: Camaenidae
- Genus: Amphidromus
- Species: A. janus

Binomial name
- Amphidromus janus (L. Pfeiffer, 1854)

Synonyms
- Amphidromus (Amphidromus) janus (L. Pfeiffer, 1854) alternative representation; Bulimus janus L. Pfeiffer, 1854 (original combination)

= Amphidromus janus =

Species of tree snail

Amphidromus janus is a species of air-breathing tree snail, an arboreal gastropod mollusk in the family Camaenidae.

== Description ==
The height of the shell attains 47 mm, its diameter 20 mm.

(Original description in Latin) This imperforate shell, which can be dextral or sinistral, is subfusiform-oblong, solid, and barely glossy. It is yellow with three external opaque green bands and internally glossy dark chestnut, the internal coloration not reaching the peristome. The basal band is very wide, and the shell is adorned with scattered chestnut varices. The spire is conical and rather sharp. The shell comprises six to seven somewhat convex whorls, with the body whorl occupying two-fifths of the shell's length and attenuated at the base. The columella is vertical and straight. The aperture is oblique, semi-oval, and subangulate at the base. The peristome is somewhat thickened, shortly reflexed, and white, with the margins joined by a dark chestnut callus.

== Distribution ==
This species is endemic to the Mergui Archipelago, Myanmar.
