= Money Island =

Money Island may refer to:

== Asia ==
- Money Island, Myanmar, in the Mergui Archipelago
- Money Island, Paracel Islands, in the South China Sea

== United States ==
- Money Island (Branford, Connecticut), one of the Thimble Islands
- Money Island, New Jersey, a community in Downe Township, Cumberland County, New Jersey
- Money Island, Salem County, New Jersey, a community in Elsinboro Township, New Jersey
- Money Island, near Hollins Island, in the Great South Bay off of Long Island, New York
