= Kyunsu =

Kyunsu Kanmaw
- Town
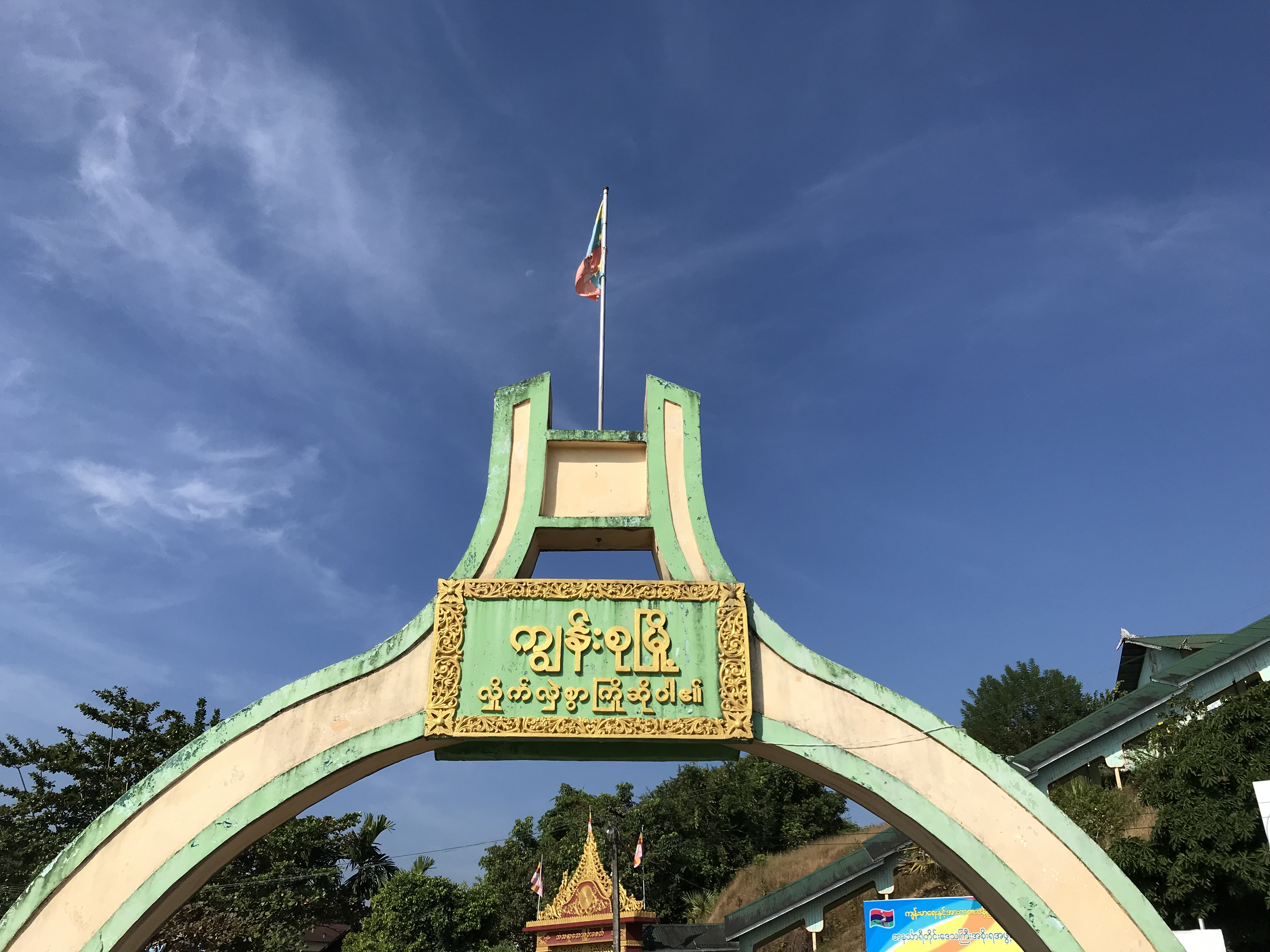

- Location in Burma
- Coordinates: 11°48′6″N 98°31′32″E
- Country: Myanmar
- Region: Tanintharyi Region
- District: Myeik District
- Township: Kyunsu Township
- Time zone: UTC+6.30 (MST)

Kyunsu, better known as Kanmaw, is a small town in the Mergui Archipelago of south-eastern Burma. It is the principal town of Kyunsu Township in Myeik District which since 1990 has covered much of the archipelago. The town lies on the north-eastern coast of Kanmaw Kyun, south-west of Myeik (Mergui).
