= Palauk =

Palauk ပလောက်
- Town
- Location in Myanmar
- Coordinates: 13°15′44″N 98°37′53″E
- Country: Myanmar
- Region: Tanintharyi
- District: Myeik
- Township: Palaw

Area
  - Total: 17.93 sq mi (46.4 km^{2})

Population (2019)
  - Total: 6,003
  - Density: 334.8/sq mi (129.3/km^{2})
- Time zone: UTC+6.30 (MMT)

Palauk is a town in Palaw Township, Taninthayi Region, Myanmar. It is located on the main coastal road, Route 8, between Dawei and Palaw. Palauk is the administrative seat of the Palauk Subtownship.

== Administrative subdivisions ==
The administrative divisions of the Palauk Subtownship are the following:

- Kyauklonegyi
- Pyichar
- Sinhtoegyi
- Nanthilar
- Pyinbugyi
