= Kin Shein =

Burmese politician

Member of the Amyotha Hluttaw
- Incumbent
- Assumed office 1 February 2016
- Constituency: Tanintharyi No.9
- Majority: 37,271 votes

Personal details
- Born: 10 February 1940 (age 86) Palaw, Burma (Myanmar)
- Party: National League for Democracy
- Spouse: Hla
- Parent(s): Hlaw Swe(father); Saw Thit(mother)
- Education: Ten Grade

Kin Shein (Burmese: ကင်းရှိန်, born 10 February 1980) is a Burmese politician who currently serves as a House of Nationalities member of parliament for Tanintharyi No. 9 constituency. He is a member of National League for Democracy.

== Political career ==
Kin was elected as an Amyotha Hluttaw MP, winning a majority of votes 37,271 from Tanintharyi Region No.9 parliamentary constituency.

He also serves as a member of Amyotha Hluttaw Citizens' Fundamental Rights, the Democracy and Human Rights Committee.
