= 1948 Palaw Christmas Eve Massacre =

Massacre part of the Karen conflict

- Part of the Karen conflict
- Location: Palaw, Mergui District, Tenasserim Division, Burma
- Date: 24 December 1948
- Target: Karen civilians
- Attack type: Massacre
- Weapon: Hand grenades
- Deaths: More than 80
- Victim: Karen Christians
- Perpetrators: Personnel associated with local auxiliary forces, reportedly including Sitwundans

The 1948 Palaw Christmas Eve massacre was an attack on ethnic Karen civilians in the village of Palaw, in Mergui District, Tenasserim Division, Union of Burma (present-day Tanintharyi Region, Myanmar), on 24 December 1948. During Christmas Eve celebrations, armed personnel associated with local government auxiliary forces attacked Karen Christians attending religious services. More than 80 people were reportedly killed.
