= Abortion in Zambia =

In Zambia, abortion is legal if the pregnancy would threaten the mother's life or physical or mental health or those of existing children, or if it would cause a birth defect. Zambia has one of the most permissive abortion laws in Africa, though its restrictions limit access. The Termination of Pregnancy (TOP) Act, passed in 1972, legalizes abortion if approved by medical professionals. It requires signatures from three doctors, including one specialist. Amendments to the bill and medical guidelines clarify that the law allows the consideration of situations such as pregnancy from rape, as well as socioeconomic factors.

Legal abortions are available but often expensive or difficult to access. Some critics of Zambia's abortion law believe that the TOP Act's restrictions are barriers to access for most Zambians. Other critics believe that the country provides for abortions in law but not in practice. The majority of women in Zambia do not know about the abortion law, and many healthcare providers do not know its terms. Conscientious objection to abortion by medical providers is common. Public providers provide abortions for free, but unofficial costs are often high. Most abortions are performed unsafely by illegal practitioners. Abortion complications commonly occur. Unsafe abortions cause 30% of maternal deaths. Public health providers legally do not charge money for abortions, but unofficial fees are common. Many women cannot afford safe surgical abortions. Medical abortions are widespread in cities. Rural areas have low access to abortion. Adolescents are likely to have unsafe abortions.

Abortion is stigmatised in Zambia. A majority of Zambians believe abortion should be illegal. Zambia's state religion is Christianity, and churches are influential in opposing abortion on religious grounds. Supporters of abortion believe legal abortion is a solution to public health issues.

== Legislation ==
The Termination of Pregnancy (TOP) Act legalizes abortion if the pregnancy increases the risk of death or physical or mental health issues for the mother or any existing children, or if it would result in a birth defect. The mother's age and environment in the present or near future may be considered. An abortion must be approved by three medical professionals, including one specialist. This requirement may be waived if one doctor believes it is an emergency. It must be performed in a registered location by a registered practitioner, with the woman's informed consent. Performing or receiving an illegal abortion is punishable by seven years of prison. The law allows medical professionals to object to performing an abortion, except in emergencies. The sentence is seven years for illegally providing an abortion and fourteen years for illegally obtaining or assisting in an abortion.

In May 2009, the Ministry of Health (MOH) wrote a set of guidelines on how to determine whether a pregnancy poses a risk to the woman's health, based on objective and subjective socioeconomic factors. The guidelines allow health providers to perform an abortion based on these factors with the woman's consent and permit mid-level providers to provide abortions in the first trimester. The guidelines say that clients must be referred to providers willing to assist with abortion, that most government healthcare facilities must ensure access to abortion, and that conscientious objection only applies to individual doctors providing abortion itself. The TOP Act does not specify a gestational limit, but the MOH has regulated that abortion is banned after fetal viability, at 28 weeks.

Zambia has one of the region's most liberal abortion laws. It is one of the only countries in Africa to allow abortions for socioeconomic reasons. Its law complies with Article 14(2)(c) of the Maputo Protocol, which it has ratified. However, its legislation has been called a "paper law". The law is open to interpretation and its restrictions make abortion difficult. Unlike in most countries with legal abortion, abortion complications are common. The requirement for three signatures leads to challenges since professionals may choose not to sign. For example, Marie Stopes International was temporarily banned for failing to secure the signatures. Policy analysts have contextualized Zambia's situation in contrast with the abortion laws of Ethiopia, which makes abortion illegal but provides for safe abortions, and Tanzania, which only allows abortion to save a life but has lower requirements for the approval of health workers.

Global abortion supporters present Zambia as an example of permissive legislation, but the consensus in Zambia is ambiguous. Some abortion supporters say the TOP Act is restrictive as the requirements for legal abortion limit access; others say the law is liberal but the actual situation must change to represent this. Uncertainty about the law and the option of conscientious objection may lead to medical professionals refusing to provide abortions. The requirement for three signatures is controversial since it is costly, especially for poor and rural women. People working to increase access to abortions say it is difficult to educate doctors and the public about the abortion guidelines and that many more people work to restrict abortion access than to increase it.

== History ==
Before 1972, the penal code of Zambia criminalised abortion. In 1971, the year before abortion was decriminalised, the country had only one doctor per 8,110 people. The Termination of Pregnancy Act 1972 (Act No. 26 of 1972) was proposed to the National Assembly of Zambia. It was drafted based on the United Kingdom's Abortion Act 1967, including Section 4 of the latter act, which permitted conscientious objection. It was passed eight years into the presidency of Kenneth Kaunda, whose Zambian Humanism ideology involved conservative Christian, patriarchal views on female sexuality. The Minister of Health presented it to the parliament, saying, "the purpose of this Bill is to amend and clarify the law relating to termination of pregnancy by registered medical practitioners". He argued that clarifying the law would remove doubts among medical practitioners and prevent deaths. His closing remarks said the law did "not open the flood-gates for termination of pregnancy upon demand". Opposing MPs argued that it would increase the number of abortions. The bill passed by 66 to 13 votes. The Catholic Church in Zambia wrote to the Secretary General to the Cabinet to protest the bill, claiming that it had been passed too quickly, without public debate, and was based on a British law. The Speaker of the Parliament wrote to Kaunda to clarify that the bill would not legalize abortion on demand, writing, "the Bill itself is meant to serve two to five people in twenty years or so". Kaunda signed the bill into law.

The passing of the TOP Act was not followed by technical guidance for implementation. The act was amended in 1994. A 2005 amendment specified that abortion is allowed in the case of child rape.

Dilation and curettage was the standard method of abortion until the 2000s, despite the World Health Organization's recommendation of manual vacuum aspiration (MVA). In 1988, University Teaching Hospital (UTH) and the international NGO Ipas began a successful project to increace the hospital's capacity for abortions and introduce MVA. In the early 1990s, NGOs supported by USAID introduced a training program, but its resource and infrastructure requirements received insufficient government support amid the AIDS epidemic. UTH was the only abortion facility. In 1992, the government reformed its health system to be decentralized and include an "essential package" of services, including MVA. This reform occurred during the peak of the Zambian AIDS epidemic, which weakened the healthcare system too much for other initiatives.

In 2008, the MOH began a national assessment of unsafe abortion with the goal of reducing maternal mortality and meeting the U.N. Millennium Development Goals. It formed a team of legislators and representatives of the WHO and Ipas. It recommended expanding medical abortion, training mid-level providers in surgical abortion to increase access in rural areas, and drafting guidelines. Beginning in August 2009, the MOH collaborated with Ipas and UTH on a pilot project to introduce medical abortions to hospitals. It planned to implement comprehensive abortion care in 7 hospitals and 21 primary health facilities across Lusaka and Copperbelt Province. The team trained, supervised, and supplied equipment to 128 providers. In the second phase, it helped pharmacists access updated abortion drugs. It performed outreach in collaboration with the Planned Parenthood Association of Zambia and seven community-based organizations. The project lasted two years and led to 25 of the 28 facilities providing comprehensive abortion care. The others were unwilling to perform abortion services.

The MOH's program led to an increase in providers' support for abortion and confidence in performing it. Most of the providers and pharmacists who participated agreed that they should support abortions. After misoprostol and mifepristone became available in the 25 facilities, pharmacists became more aware of these pills and more likely to provide access or information. At the time, misoprostol was widely known as an abortifacient, but over-the-counter drugs derived from it were only approved for other purposes. The misoprostol drug Cytotec was imported and was known as "the Chinese pill". In July 2010, mifepristone was first imported for limited use in public facilities. In early 2012, the Ministry of Health approved Medabon, a combination pack of mifepristone and misoprostol, for abortions, and an NGO procured the first shipment of it.

Article 12 of the Constitution of Zambia protects fetal rights, saying "A person shall not deprive an unborn child of life by termination of pregnancy except in accordance with the conditions laid down by an Act of Parliament for that purpose". In 2015, a draft for Article 28 was proposed that would say "Every person has a right to life, which begins at conception". The amendment was deferred for being "contentious" and was not included in the Constitution of Zambia Amendment Bill of 2015. It was sent to a referendum that failed due to low turnout.

Zambian nonprofits receive funding from Western nations to conduct legal abortions. After the United States overturned its right to abortion, their leaders were concerned it would threaten their funding.

== Prevalence ==
In 2015–2019, Zambia had an annual average of 140,000 abortions. The share of unintended pregnancies resulting in abortion was 28%, up from 19% in 1990–2004. Between 2009 and 2011, the annual number of cases of abortion did not increase, but the proportion of safe, legal abortions increased from 3.2% to 7.7%. A 2010 survey found that most people consider self-induced abortions or traditional healers to perform abortions, only considering public health facilities if such procedures went wrong.

=== Legal abortions ===
The law requires abortions to be performed by registered medical practitioners rather than nurses. As of 2018, Zambia has one doctor per 12,000 people, making access difficult, especially in rural areas. The law requires a signature from a specialist within a field relevant to the abortion, which further restricts access. Activists have argued that the requirement is unrealistic and has not resulted in access to safe abortions.

As of 2013, 88 public facilities provide abortions. Abortion facilities are concentrated in Lusaka; the largest provider of abortions is the UTH. Public providers must provide abortions for no cost besides a registration fee, while private providers charge money. The registration fee is higher at UTH to incentivize seeking care at local clinics. Public health providers often illegally charge unofficial fees. The average cost of an abortion at UTH is 283 kwacha, or US$52.6, as of 2013. Unofficial fees are a large part of the cost. Women who treat complications of an unsafe abortion may pay 70% more than getting a safe abortion. Some employees of public-sector facilities provide abortion care there under private arrangements at higher prices.

Conscientious objection reduces the number of safe abortion providers. The prevalence of conscientious objection is unknown, as there is no requirement to record it, but is likely high. The main reason for objection is Christian ideas opposing abortion. Secondary motives include the ideas that women seeking abortion should have used birth control and that abortion providers' job is only to prevent harm. Non-objectors agree that abortion is against Christian morality, but believe the reasons for seeking safe abortion outweigh this. Doctors' views vary on which situations warrant abortion. Frederick Chiluba's 1991 declaration that Zambia is a Christian nation contributed to doctors' conscientious objection. The stigma about abortion influences conscientious objection, as senior doctors may prevent doctors in their clinics from providing abortions, and people avoid talking about abortion publicly.

Many women cannot afford to get an abortion at a hospital, and many legal abortion providers charge predatory costs. Fees within the official healthcare system are low and sometimes waived, but stigma and lack of knowledge prevent access. In urban areas, "Chinese clinics" have become common, where Chinese doctors charge high prices to perform abortions that other doctors decline. Women who receive abortions often borrow money from friends and relatives or sell belongings to afford the procedure. Women who receive post-abortion care often have more complicated funding, which delays the procedure.

Medical abortions by pharmacists are common in urban areas. Misoprostol is commonly available in pharmacies and doctors sometimes prescribe it for medical abortion. Pharmacy workers are not allowed to sell abortion drugs directly; their role is to share information about abortion with women who seek it.

=== Unsafe abortions ===
Many abortions in Zambia are performed by illegal practitioners, locally known as "quacks". A University of Zambia study found that, in five major hospitals from 2003 to 2008, 600 women obtained legal abortions, while 52,800 women were treated for abortion complications. Abortions are difficult due to a lack of information, societal stigma, objections from health workers, and insufficient services. A 2016 study in the journal Social Science & Medicine found that up to 70% of the country's abortions are unsafe. A lack of resources, resistance from some health providers, and limited knowledge of abortion options lead women to perform unsafe abortions, especially those who are poorer or younger. Many women induce abortions by using traditional medicines or inserting cassava sticks into their uteri. Some use unsafe drugs like chloroquine or quinine.

As of 2017, six per thousand women die of abortion complications. A 2011 report by the Center for Reproductive Rights and the U.N. Committee on the Elimination of Discrimination against Women estimated that 30% of maternal deaths in the country were caused by unsafe abortions. This ratio is significantly higher than Africa's average. Deaths in the antepartum period comprise 31.2% of maternal deaths. The highest rate of maternal deaths caused by abortions is in Kitwe District, at 14%, as of 2021. Unsafe abortion often causes maternal near misses. In 2014, across three provinces, 42% of post-abortion care treated morbidity cases, and 7% treated near misses.

Adolescents are more likely to seek unsafe abortions. The Ministry of Health's 2011 Zambian Adolescent Health Strategic Plan identified unsafe abortions as a priority. Adolescents have lower knowledge of the abortion law and are more likely to face opposition by health providers. In 2005, 16% of patients at UTH receiving treatment for abortion-related complications were aged between 12 and 19. Some had avoided contraception, believing that it could cause side effects, that they were too young, or that they lacked knowledge.

== Societal factors ==
Social norms and stigma about sex, pregnancy, and abortion lead to emotional harm among women deciding whether or not to terminate their pregnancies. Some women decide the health risk of having a secret abortion outweighs the social risk of people finding out. Unofficial payments in medical facilities are widely known to occur illegally but continue because the stigma prevents women from reporting them. Abortions in hospitals are publicly recorded, which may drive women to opt for illegal abortions.

Zambian adolescents who get pregnant face social condemnation, so they keep abortions secret. Some get abortions out of concern that their family could not handle the child. Among secondary school students, a girl's decision to terminate a pregnancy is often influenced by fear of her fathers' reaction, concerns about her personal and financial relationships their partners, and wanting to continue education. Some adolescents delay abortions as they are unaware or in denial of their pregnancy symptoms. The national guidelines support abortions that are "the best interest of the minor", but healthcare workers may misunderstand the law to limit implementation. Some providers refuse abortion care to adolescents without parental consent or unauthorised fees.

Rural Zambia has low access to abortion services. Rural health bureaucrats have the job of overseeing and advising reproductive health programs. Their position is above managers of district health facilities. Bureaucrats are knowledgeable about abortion in Zambia and view it as a public health issue, though facility managers are often uninformed and their facilities do not provide abortions. The political and social sensitivity of the topic leads to many bureaucrats not discussing it outside of formal meetings. Some district health directors view abortion as an urban concern. Rural residents often keep silent about the topic, tolerating abortions that are kept private and reproaching cases that become public to defend their own morals. Most abortions are not reported to police.

Men influence their partners who decide whether to terminate their pregnancies. Some men are not involved in their partners' pregnancies because the man denies paternity or the woman fears his response. Cases where the man is involved mostly result in safe abortions as men provide money or find information about safe abortion. Male friends and relatives may play a similar role in helping with an abortion. It has therefore been suggested that abortion education initiatives should include men.

The rate of abortion is the same between women who have or do not have HIV. Community attitudes say that a pregnant woman with HIV should complete the pregnancy, especially if the woman is having antiretroviral therapy. Though people with HIV are stigmatized, the stronger stigma against abortion influences people's opinions that women should continue their pregnancies, especially among women.

=== Knowledge of abortion ===
Many pregnant women are unaware of abortion and the TOP Act. According to a 2008 report by the Guttmacher Institute, many healthcare providers are unaware of the legal requirements for abortion. Women have a widespread fear of abortion being painful, resulting from nurses in the 1990s who would withhold pain relievers as a punishment.

A 2014 survey in three provinces found that only 16% of women knew the grounds for legal abortion, and 40% knew that it was legal to save the woman's life. Knowledge of the abortion law was higher among women with more education and those with more liberal attitudes about abortion; it was not correlated with knowing someone who has had an abortion. Of the respondents, 15% thought abortion should be broadly legal, and 39% thought it should be legal if it threatened the woman's life. Though 90% agreed with the statement "abortion is immoral", 71% agreed that "women should have access to safe abortion services."

Zambia's Comprehensive Sexuality Education (CSE) framework does not include the topic of abortion due to cultural and religious concerns. Opponents of Zambia's the CSE framework have alleged that it promotes abortion, which its organizers have denied.

== Post-abortion care ==
As of 2017, between 30% and 50% of acute gynecological admissions are abortion-related. Due to stigma, some women receiving post-abortion care report their abortions as miscarriages.

At UTH in 2017, the cost of post-abortion care (PAC) ranged from US$47 to $56, while a safe abortion cost between $37 and $39. The hospital spent an estimated $109,811 per year to treat unsafe abortions, thirteen times its spending on performing abortions. Nationally, the average cost of an unsafe abortion is estimated to be $52, compared to $38 for a safe abortion. Annually, the country spends between $403,000 and $3.5 million on unsafe abortions and between $221,000 and $701,000 on safe abortions. The country spent 0.2% of its health budget on PAC as of 2017.

The COVID-19 pandemic led to an increase in abortion-related hospital admissions. Pandemic restrictions made it difficult to access contraceptives since people could not travel to hospitals and healthcare workers who normally distributed contraceptives were overloaded with coronavirus patients. Contraceptive distribution resumed in 2022.

== Debate and activism ==
Some Zambians believe abortion should be banned, as it violates Biblical teachings. Churches in Zambia, especially the Catholic Church and smaller churches, such as the Pentecostal Church, strongly influence the abortion debate. Religious groups opposing abortion reform commonly emphasize that the current law is based on science, avoiding invoking religious arguments.

In Zambia and other African countries, abortion-rights activists frame the issue in terms of public health. They often avoid the term "rights" as it would conflict with anti-abortion activists' arguments about rights. Organizations such as the Society for Women and AIDS in Zambia and Youth Vision Zambia aim to address unintended pregnancies by educating citizens about reproductive health.

== See also ==
- Health in Zambia
- Women in Zambia
