= Kadan Island =

Island of Myanmar

Coordinates: 12°30′N 98°22′E

Location of Kadan Island in Myanmar

Kadan Island (Burmese: ကတန်ကျွန်း) is the largest island in the Mergui Archipelago, Myanmar. Its area is 450 square kilometres (170 sq mi). The highest point is French Bay Peak (767 m (2,516 ft)), which is the highest point in the archipelago.

== Etymology ==
Under the British, the island was known as King Island, King's Island, and later as Kadan Kyun or Kadan Island, based on the local pronunciation.

== Communities ==
Among the communities on Kadan Island are Gyindaungchaung, Kabingyaung, Kapa, Kyataw, Mayanchaung, Tharawuntaungnge and Yemyitkyi.

== See also ==
- List of islands of Burma
