= Thayawthadangyi =

- Island of the Mergui Archipelago
- Location within Myanmar
- Coordinates: 12°20′45″N 98°0′5″E
- Country: Myanmar
- Region: Taninthayi

Area
  - Total: 120 km^{2} (46 sq mi)
- Elevation: 533 m (1,749 ft)
- Time zone: UTC+6:30 (Myanmar Standard Time)

Thayawthadangyi Kyun, also known as Elphinstone Island, is an island in the Mergui Archipelago, Burma.

== Geography ==
Thayawthadangyi is irregular in shape, hilly and thickly wooded. It is part of the northern group of islands of the archipelago.

Thayawthadangyi's area is 120 square kilometres (46 square miles). The highest points, both rising on the western part of the island are 533-metre-high (1,749-foot) Elphinstone Peak and 430-metre-high (1,410-foot) False Peak.

=== Nearby islands ===
Daung Kyun lies off Thayawthadangyi's southeastern shore.
