= Kabosa Island =

Island in Myanmar

Coordinates: 12°47′N 97°51′E

Location of Kabosa Island in Burma

Kabosa Island is an island in the Mergui Archipelago, Burma (Myanmar). It is a 7 km long and roughly square-shaped island located at the northwestern end of the archipelago 15 km to the north of Tenasserim Island. Kabosa is a hilly and thickly wooded island with four conspicuous mountains reaching a maximum height of 396 m.
