= Than Kyun =

Island in Myanmar

Coordinates: 9°48′45″N 98°02′00″E

Location of Than Kyun in Burma

Than Kyun or Davis Island is an island at the southern end of the Mergui Archipelago, Burma. It is the largest and highest island of the Alladin Islands, a scattered cluster of islands extending to the W and SSW of Zadetkyi Island. This densely wooded island has two main peaks, each with a height of around 450 metres (1,476 feet). The island has a roughly round shape with a diameter of about 6 kilometres (3.7 miles). Off its eastern shore rises a 5.5-metre-high (18.0-foot) rock surrounded by a reef. Than Kyun lies 4.5 kilometres (2.8 miles) west of the southern end of Zadetkyi Island.
