= Daung Kyun =

Island in Myanmar

Daung Kyun ဒေါင်းကျွန်း
- Island of the Mergui Archipelago
- Location within Myanmar
- Coordinates: 12°14′0″N 98°05′0″E
- Country: Myanmar
- Region: Taninthayi

Area
  - Total: 110 km^{2} (42 sq mi)
- Time zone: UTC+6:30 (Myanmar Standard Time)

Daung Kyun (Burmese: ဒေါင်းကျွန်း), also known as Ross Island, is an island in the Mergui Archipelago, Myanmar (Burma).

== Geography ==
Daung Kyun is part of the northern group of islands of the archipelago. It is located off the southeastern shore of Thayawthadangyi Kyun. Its length is 16 kilometres (9.9 mi) and its area 110 square kilometres (42 sq mi).
