= Saganthit Kyun =

Coordinates: 11°56′N 98°29′E

Location of Saganthit Island in Burma

Saganthit Island (Sellore Island) is an island in the Mergui Archipelago, Burma (Myanmar). Its area is 257 square kilometres (99 sq mi).
