= VES Group =

VES Group (VES Group Co. Ltd.) is a holding company based in Thailand. VES is a leading investor in Burma with interests in its main industries of logging, gem mining, jewellery, pearl farming, commercial fishing and tourism. It is also involved in various construction and infrastructure projects in Burma. The group is headed by Vikrom Aisiri, a Thai businessman and politician. Aisiri also owns and operates the Andaman Club, an island casino cum golf resort on the island of Thahtay Kyun, under a concession from the Burmese government. The group previously controlled the Dusit Island Resort in Chiang Rai prior to being sold off to the Katathani Collection of Resorts in 2017 and rebranded as The Riverie by Katathani, and is building a new four star hotel in Ranong. The group also has a long term eco-tourism concession on St. Lukes Island.
