= Tenasserim Island =

Coordinates: 12°34′N 97°51′E

Location of Tenasserim Island in Burma

Tenasserim Island is an island in the Mergui Archipelago, Burma (Myanmar). It is located at the northwestern end of the archipelago 15 kilometres (9.3 mi) to the south of Kabosa Island. 494 metres (1,621 ft) high, Tenasserim Peak is the highest peak of this steep and thickly wooded island. It is a 10 kilometres (6.2 mi) long and irregularly shaped island.
