= Christie Island =

Island in Myanmar

Coordinates: 9°37′N 97°58′E

Location of Christie Island in Burma

Christie Island is an island in the Mergui Archipelago and the southernmost point of Burma (Myanmar). It lies at the southern end of the archipelago 18 km (11 mi) to the NNE of Ko Surin Nuea, and the Thai-Burmese oceanic border is located between these two islands.

Christie Island is 4.6 km (2.9 mi) long and has several peaks covered with thick forest; the tallest is 325 m (1,066 ft) high. Murray Island and Sanders Island are small rocky islets off its southern shores. Christie Island is part of the Alladin Islands subgroup. It features a clearing at the top with a helicopter pad and small dusty military base.

== History ==
=== 1998 massacres ===
In May 1998, Colonel Zaw Min landed on Christie Island and found 59 Burmese nationals living there to gather wood and bamboo, in violation of Burmese law. General Than Shwe ordered they were to be "eliminated" and all were subsequently murdered.

A few days later, Burmese troops from the same base captured a Thai fishing boat that had strayed close to Christie Island. The 22 Burmese and Thai fishermen on board were shot and buried on the island.

== See also ==
- List of islands of Burma
