= Auriol Island =

- Island of the Mergui Archipelago
- Location within Myanmar
- Coordinates: 9°37′20″N 98°6′5″E
- Country: Myanmar
- Region: Taninthayi
- Elevation: 183 m (600 ft)
- Time zone: UTC+6:30 (Myanmar Standard Time)

Auriol Island (Burmese: အော်ရိယိုကျွန်း) is an island at the southern end of the Mergui Archipelago, Burma. Its highest point is 183 m and is located at its western end. The island is densely wooded, and lies 4.5 km south of Breuer Island.
