= Kyunsu Township =

Kyunsu Township ကျွန်းစုမြို့နယ် Kanmaw Township
- Township
- Location in Myeik district

- Location in Burma
- Coordinates: 11°48′6″N 98°31′32″E
- Country: Burma
- Region: Taninthayi Region
- District: Myeik District
- Capital: Kyunsu

Area
  - Total: 3,137 km^{2} (1,211 sq mi)

Population (2014)
  - Total: 171,753
  - Density: 54.75/km^{2} (141.8/sq mi)
- Time zone: UTC+6.30 (MST)

Kyunsu or Kanmaw Township is a township of Myeik District in the Taninthayi Division of Myanmar. The principal town is Kyunsu (older name Kanmaw). The township constitutes much of the Mergui Archipelago to the west, northwest and southwest of the city of Mergui (Myeik). The main town is located on the north-east coast of Kanmaw Island to the southwest of Mergui city.

== History ==
Kyunsu Township was created out of Mergui Township in 1990, the remainder of which became Myeik Township.
