= Sitwundans =

- Active: 1948–1949
- Country: (Post-independence Burma (1948–1962)) Union of Burma
- Allegiance: Burmese government
- Branch: Auxiliary militia
- Type: Paramilitary force
- Role: Internal security; counterinsurgency
- Engagements: Communist insurgency in Burma; Karen conflict; 1948 Palaw Christmas Eve Massacre

Commanders
- Notable commanders: Aung Gyi (associated with organization)

The Sitwundans were government-authorized auxiliary militia units established in Burma in 1948, during the early years of the country's independence. Also known as the Union Police Special Reserve, they were organized to reinforce the government's security forces amid communist insurgencies and growing political instability. Their organization included locally raised battalions, some of which were associated with political factions.
