= Bentinck Kyun =

Island in the Mergui Archipelago, Myanmar

Coordinates: 11°43′N 98°02′E

Location of Bentinck Kyun in Burma

Bentinck Kyun (Bentinck Island) is an island in the Mergui Archipelago, Burma (Myanmar). It lies 14 km west of Letsok-aw Kyun in the Andaman Sea. Bentinck has a very irregular indented shape. The island is thickly wooded and its area is 78 km^{2}.
