= Zadetkyi =

- Island of the Mergui Archipelago
- Location within Myanmar
- Coordinates: 9°57′30″N 98°11′20″E
- Country: Myanmar
- Region: Taninthayi

Area
  - Total: 176 km^{2} (68 sq mi)
- Elevation: 864 m (2,835 ft)
- Time zone: UTC+6:30 (Myanmar Standard Time)

Zadetkyi Island or Zadetkyi Kyun, also known as Saint Matthew's Island, is an island at the southern end of the Mergui Archipelago, Burma. Its northern side forms the southern shore of Hastings Harbor, where there is a base of the Myanmar Navy.

== Geography ==
Having a length of about 35 km (22 mi) and an area of 176 km^{2} (68 sq mi), Zadetkyi is the largest island of the southern group of the archipelago. It has two prominent peaks, the highest of which is 864 metres and is located near the middle of the island, at its southern end rises a 585 m (1,919 ft) high summit. The island is hilly and densely wooded and lies 2.5 km (1.6 mi) south of Hastings Island.

=== Nearby islands ===
The Alladin Islands, the largest of which is Than Kyun, are a scattered cluster of islands extending to the W and SSW of Zadetkyi Island.
