= Aye Aung =

Burmese democracy activist

- Education: Dagon University
- Occupation: democracy activist
- Organization: All Burma Federation of Student Unions
- Known for: 1998-2012 imprisonment
- Parent(s): Thaung Sein and San Myint

Aye Aung (Burmese: အေးအောင်, pronounced [ʔé ʔàʊɰ̃]; also known as Ko Aye Aung) is a Burmese democracy activist who was imprisoned from September 1998 to July 2012. Amnesty International designated him a prisoner of conscience.

Aye Aung is the son of Thaung Sein and San Myint. He studied physics at Dagon University, where he became active in the pro-democracy group All Burma Federation of Student Unions (ABFSU). On 12 September 1998, he was arrested along with Myo Min Zaw for distributing fliers and organizing student demonstrations in Yangon. Both Aye Aung and Myo Min Zaw alleged that they were subsequently tortured in custody. At a press conference on 8 October 1998, the government announced that they had discovered a plot by Myo Min Zaw to “create disturbances in support of the National League for Democracy demand to convene parliament and to object to the ongoing university and college examinations”. Aye Aung and Myo Min Zaw were reportedly denied legal representation at their trial, which was held in Insein prison; Amnesty International also argued that the fairness of their trial was compromised by the press conference given by Burmese officials, in which they presumed the guilt of the two detainees. Both men were found guilty, and the court ordered that the sentences for each charge must be served cumulatively, rather than concurrently. As a result, Aye Aung was sentenced to a 59-year prison term, which he is currently serving in Kale prison in Burma's northwestern Sagaing Region; Myo Min Zaw was sentenced to 52 years.

The Assistance Association for Political Prisoners has alleged that conditions of Aye Aung's imprisonment are poor. In January 2005, his family reported that he was suffering from malaria, which was being worsened by prison officials denying him blankets in the winter. His mother stated that he was also suffering from gastric disease and severe back pain due to prison conditions.

In January 2012, Myo Min Zaw and dozens of other political prisoners were released in a general amnesty. However, Aye Aung remained imprisoned without an official statement on his case. Aye Aung was released on 3 July 2012.
