= Palaw Township =

Palaw Township ပုလော
- Township
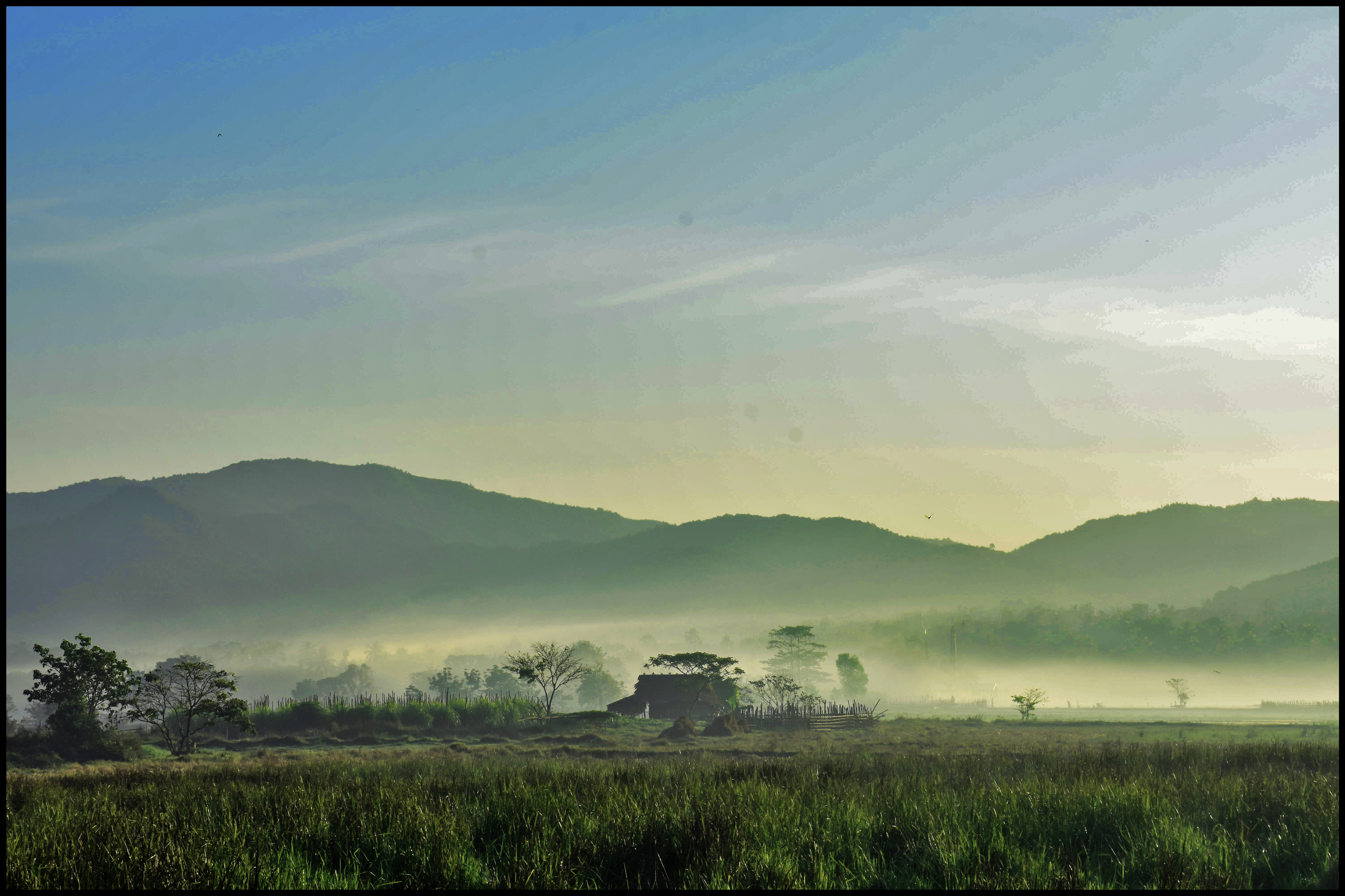

- Location in Myeik district
- Coordinates: 13°07′N 98°41′E
- Country: Myanmar
- Region: Taninthayi
- District: Myeik District
- Capital: Palaw

Area
  - Total: 1,016.92 sq mi (2,633.8 km^{2})
- Elevation: 12 ft (3.7 m)
- Highest elevation: 4,230 ft (1,290 m)

Population (2019)
  - Total: 157,164
  - Density: 154.549/sq mi (59.6717/km^{2})
  - Ethnicities: Bamar; Karen; Mon
  - Religions: Buddhism; Christianity
- Time zone: UTC+6.30 (MMT)

Palaw Township (Burmese: ပုလောမြို့နယ်) is a township of Myeik District in the Taninthayi Region of Burma (Myanmar). The principal town and administrative seat is Palaw. The township has two other towns - Palauk and Pala.

== Administrative subdivisions ==
Palaw Township is divided into twenty-seven tracts. Six of those tracts are organized into the Palauk Subtownship which occupies the northern third of the township, and which is administered from the town of Palauk.

- Kyauklonegyi (Palauk Subtownship)
- Pyichar (Palauk Subtownship)
- Sinhtoegyi (Palauk Subtownship)
- Nanthilar (Palauk Subtownship)
- Pyinbugyi (Palauk Subtownship)
- Khanti (Palauk Subtownship)
- Leikthaung
- Htaminmasar
- Taungyarkan
- Shandut
- Mikyaungthaik
- Shatpon (Shutpon) shown as Pidat in Google Map
- Pulawkone
- Pulawhpyar (Pulawbya)
- Magyikone
- Palaw (urban)
- Nantaung
- Duyinpinshaung
- Letku
- Minhtein (Mintein)
- Kade
- To
- Pala
- Zayatseik
- Kye
- Kyaukkar
- Mali (offshore islands)

The township's three townscomprise a total of 13 urban wards. The 27 village tracts additionally contain 163 villages.

=== Communities ===
Among the villages in Palaw Township are: Banka, Bodaungseik, Kade, Kataungni, Mintein, Palawgong (Palawgon), Pidat, Tonbu, Wachaung, and Zadiwin.

There are a 50-bed township hospital, five 16-bed station hospitals at Pala, Palauk, Maligyun, Pyinbugyi and Kyaukka, one maternal and child health care centre, one urban health care centre, six rural health centers and 15 sub rural health care centers in 2011.
