= Zambia Alliance of Women =

Zambia Alliance of Women (ZAW) is a non-governmental membership organization for Zambian women founded in 1978.

== History ==
Zambia Alliance of Women was established in 1978 to promote gender equality, development and peace. ZAW was registered under the Societies Act in March 1982. By 2011 it had 15,000 members.

ZAW has paid sustained attention to environmental issues. In April 2020 the ZAW advised small-scale farmers not to sell their maize at the cheapest prices to private buyers. In June 2020 the ZAW appealed to the government to offer help to women groups and cooperatives. ZAW's Executive Director, Edah Gondwe Chimya, also encouraged women in mining areas to take advantage of government programmes to participate in Zambia's mining sector.
