= Money Island, Myanmar =

Money Island ငွေကျွန်း
- Island
- Location within Myanmar
- Coordinates: 11°49′N 98°16′E
- Country: Myanmar
- Region: Taninthayi Region
- Time zone: UTC+6:30 (MMT)

Money Island or Ngwe Kyun (Burmese: ငွေကျွန်း) is an island in the Mergui Archipelago of Taninthayi Region, Myanmar.

== Geography ==
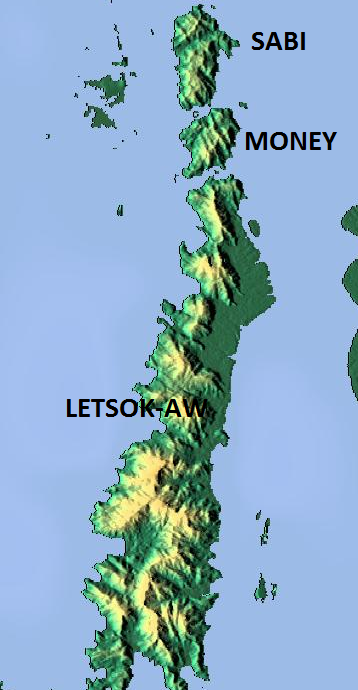
Relief map of Money and surrounding islands

Money Island lies between Letsok-aw Island to the south and Sabi (Trotter) Island to the north. The passage between Sabi and Money Island is quite shallow. The principal village on the island is Kyauk Lait, on the southeast coast. The other large village is on the northeast coast. The island is heavily forested and has small bays with sandy beaches on the west side.
