= Sabi Island =

Island in Myanmar

Coordinates: 11°53′08″N 98°16′11″E

Location of Sabi Island in Burma

Sabi Island (Sabi Kyun or Trotter Island) is an island in the Mergui Archipelago of Taninthayi Region, Burma (Myanmar). It lies between Money Island to the south and Parker Island to the north. The narrow channel between Sabi island and Money Island is rather shallow, but the 0.5-mile (0.80 km) wide channel between Sabi Island and Parker Island is quite deep. The island is heavily forested and has small bays with sandy beaches on the west side. The highest point is 326 metres (1,070 ft) above the sea. Whaleback Reef, which lies about 0.75 miles (1.21 km) off the northeast part of the island, is exposed about 8 feet (2.4 m) at low tide.
