= Myo Min Zaw =

Burmese democracy activist

- Education: University of Yangon
- Occupation: democracy activist
- Known for: 1998 to 2012 imprisonment

Myo Min Zaw (Burmese: မျိုးမင်းဇော်) is a Burmese democracy activist imprisoned from 1998 to 2012 for distributing fliers and organizing demonstrations. He was considered a prisoner of conscience by Amnesty International.

Myo Min Zaw studied English at the University of Yangon, where he became active in the pro-democracy group All Burma Federation of Student Unions (ABFSU). In December 1996, he participated in a student protest, and following the closing of Burma's universities, remaining involved in the pro-democracy movement.

On 12 September 1998, he was arrested along with Ko Aye Aung for distributing fliers and organizing student demonstrations in Yangon. Both Ko Aye Aung and Myo Min Zaw alleged that they were subsequently tortured in custody. At a press conference on 8 October 1998, the government announced that they had discovered a plot by Myo Min Zaw to “create disturbances in support of the National League for Democracy demand to convene parliament and to object to the ongoing university and college examinations”. Ko Aye Aung and Myo Min Zaw were reportedly denied legal representation at their trial, which was held in Insein prison; nor, according to the Assistance Association for Political Prisoners, were they allowed to speak in their own defense. Amnesty International further argued that the fairness of their trial was compromised by the press conference given by Burmese officials, in which they presumed the guilt of the two detainees in advance of their trial. Both men were found guilty, and the court ordered that the sentences for each charge must be served cumulatively, rather than concurrently. As a result, Ko Aye Aung was sentenced to a 59-year prison term, which he is currently serving in Kale prison in Burma's northwestern Sagaing Region; Myo Min Zaw was sentenced to 52 years, which he served four in Bassein (Pathein) Prison, East Bassein Township, Irrawaddy Division, three in Mandalay (Obo Prison), six in Putao, prior to his release.

According to the Assistance Association for Political Prisoners, Myo Min Zaw was pardoned on 13 January 2012, as part of a series of amnesties for political prisoners.
