= Thahtay Kyun =

Island

Coordinates: 9°56′46″N 98°31′53″E

Location of Thahtay Kyun in Burma

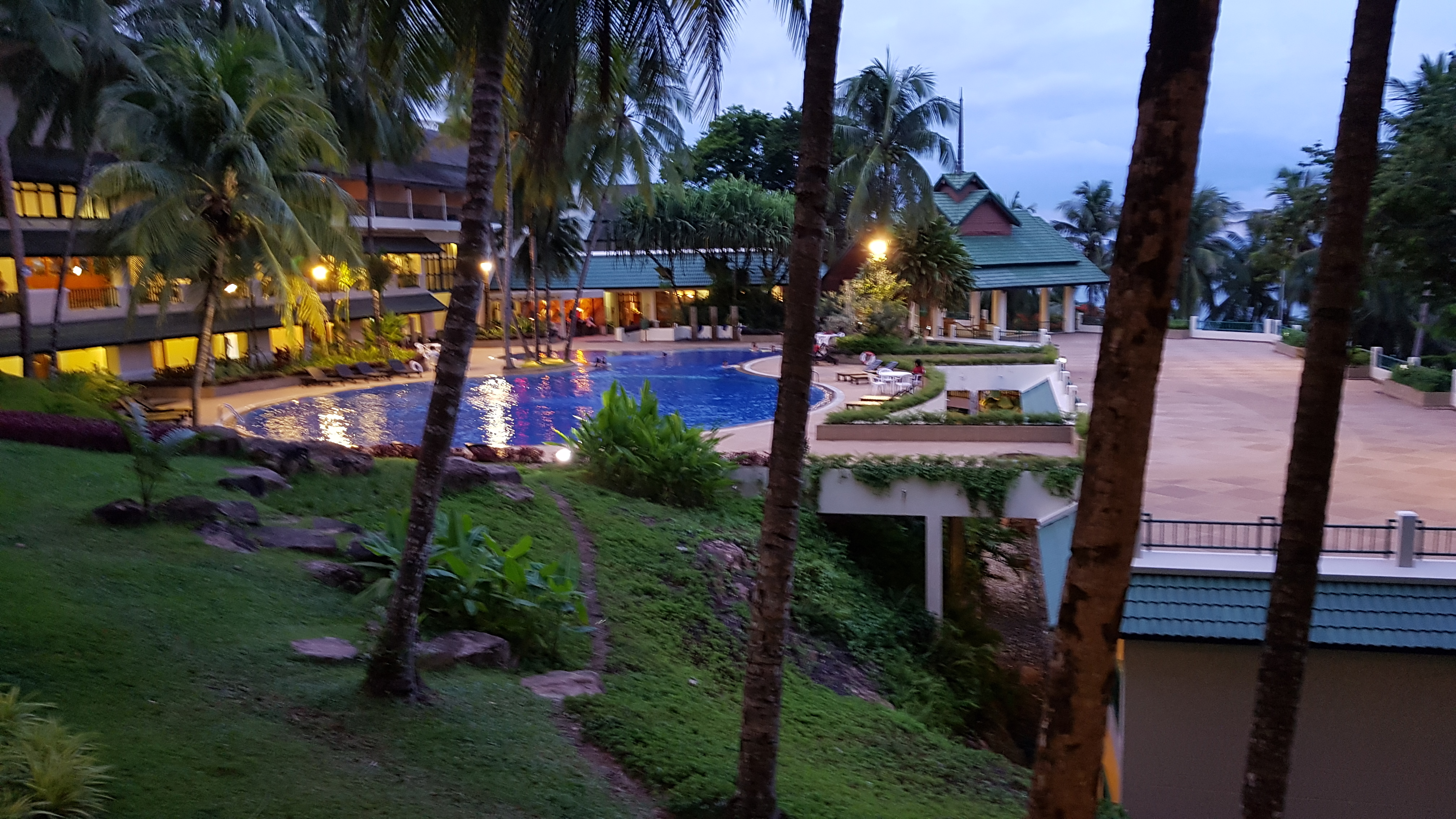
A hotel on the island.

Thahtay Island (Burmese: သူဌေးကျွန်း), also known as Thahtay Kyun and Son Island, is a small Burmese island within the Mergui Archipelago in the Andaman Sea. The island is directly adjacent to Ranong, a city in the south of Thailand and to Kawthaung (formerly Victoria Point). The island has been given by the Burmese government on a long term concession to a Thailand-based VES Group for development as a tourism. Andaman Club is a five star casino club on the island but closed in 2024. And they also operated a golf course, but abandoned it in the early 2000s.
