= Win Zaw Oo =

Tallest person in Burma (born 1977)

- Born: 1977 (age 48–49); Magway, Burma
- Known for: Tallest person in Burma

Win Zaw Oo (born 1977) is the tallest person in Burma, reaching 233 centimetres (92 in) in height. He is also known as Big Zaw. Win Zaw Oo's growth has resulted from an uncommon medical condition known as acromegaly.

== Life ==
Win Zaw Oo was born and raised in a rural village in Magway, central Burma. His family comprises working-class peasants. In his teens, his towering height became noticed following a growth spurt. He soon found it difficult to move about given his size and height and his stamina and mobility took a toll. In August 2013, Win Zaw Oo announced his decision to surgically remove the tumour which caused his drastic height of 233 centimetres (92 in). He had to travel to Singapore due to the inferior healthcare system in Burma. The media became largely interested in him after learning of his predicament.
