= Andaman Club =

Resort on Thahtay Kyun Island, Burma

Coordinates: 9°57′00″N 98°32′37″E

- Interactive map of Andaman Club
- Location: Thahtay Kyun, Kawthaung, Tanintharyi Region, Myanmar; Thahtay Kyun Island (off Kawthaung)
- Closed: February 2024
- Theme: Island resort
- No. of rooms: 205
- Signature attractions: 18-hole golf course (closed)
- Casino type: Land-based
- Owner: Grand Andaman Travel (owned by U Kyaw Lwin)
- Previous names: Grand Andaman Hotel (2016–2024)

Andaman Club was a five-star island casino and golf resort in Burma. It is located on 730 ha (1,800 acres) of Thahtay Kyun Island within the Mergui Archipelago in the Andaman Sea. Directly adjacent to Ranong, in the south of Thailand and to King Bayint Nbung (formerly Victoria Point) is a region famous for its gems, pearls, flora and fauna. The pier is 5 kilometres (3.1 mi) from the Ranong city centre and it takes 20 minutes to cross the Andaman Sea to the island resort. It is owned and operated by the VES Group of Thailand, under a long-term concession from the Burmese government. In 2016, Andaman Club is operated by Grand Andaman Travel.

In February 2024, the resort stopped its operations due to an arrest warrant issued for its owner, Kyaw Lwin.
