= Letsok-aw Kyun =

Island in the Mergui Archipelago, Myanmar

Coordinates: 11°37′N 98°15′E

Location of Letsok-aw Kyun in Burma

Letsok-aw Island (Domel Island) is an island in the Mergui Archipelago, Burma (Myanmar). With a length of 38 kilometres (24 mi) and an area of 250 square kilometres (97 sq mi), it is one of the largest islands of the archipelago. This hilly and thickly wooded island lies14 kilometres (8.7 mi) east of Bentinck Kyun. It stretches from north to south and has a maximum width of 9.7 kilometres (6.0 mi). Highest point is 683 metres (2,241 ft).
