= Women in Zambia =

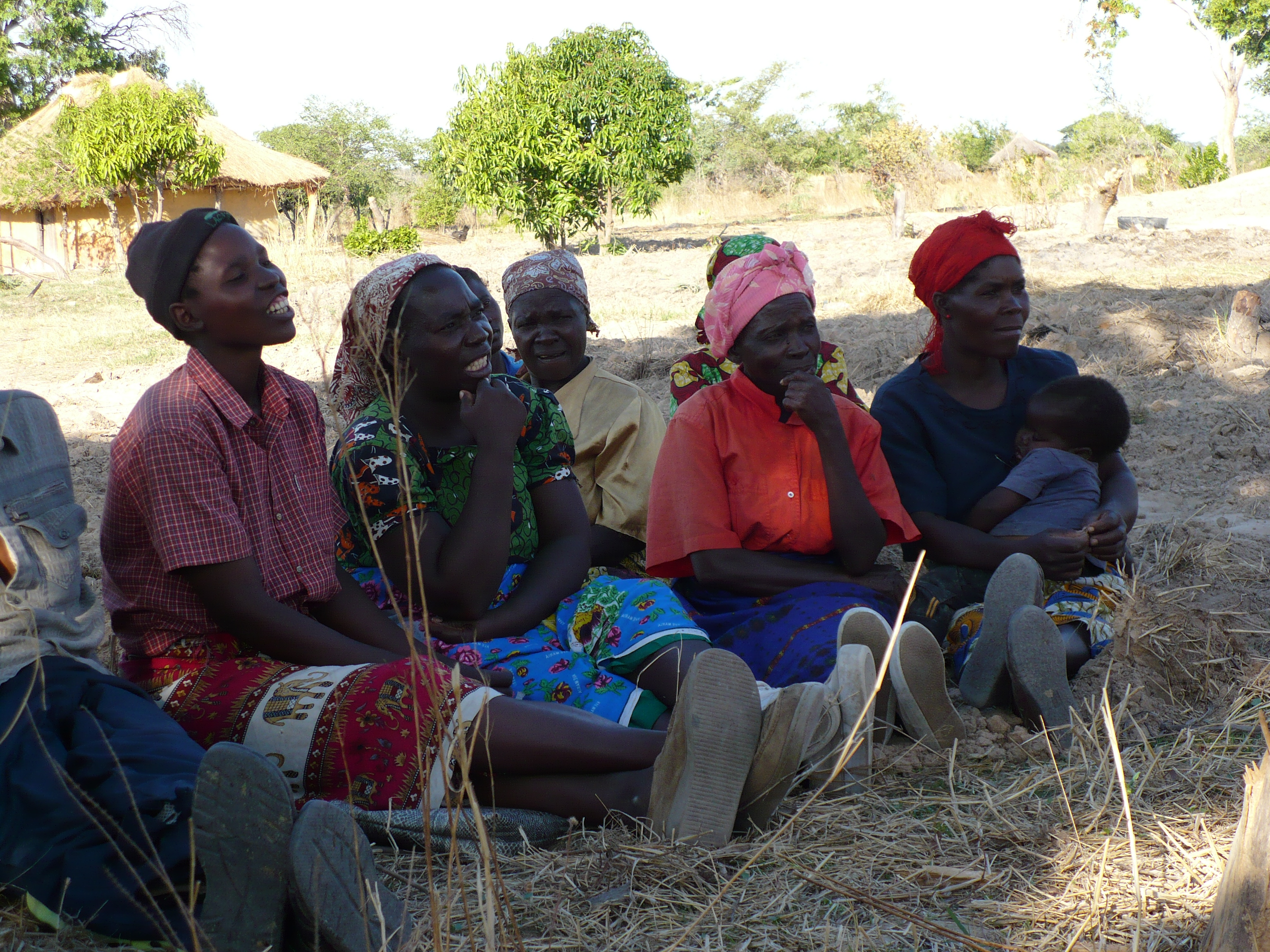
- Zambian women

General statistics
- Maternal mortality (per 100,000): 224 (2015)
- Women in parliament: 18% (2018)
- Women over 25 with secondary education: 39.2% (2010-2018)
- Women in labour force: 70.8% (2018)

Gender Inequality Index
- Value: 0.540 (2021)
- Rank: 138th out of 191

Global Gender Gap Index
- Value: 0.723 (2022)
- Rank: 62nd out of 146

The status of women in Zambia has improved in recent years. Among other things, the maternal mortality rate has dropped and the National Assembly of Zambia has enacted multiple policies aimed at decreasing violence against women. However, progress is still needed. Most women have limited access to reproductive healthcare, and the total number of women infected with HIV in the country continues to rise. Moreover, violence against women in Zambia remains common. Child marriage rates in Zambia are some of the highest in the world, and women continue to experience high levels of physical and sexual violence.

Across nearly all gender-based indicators, there is a significant disparity between the quality of life of rural, less educated, and impoverished women and their urban counterparts.

== Health ==
The Government of Zambia has ratified numerous treaties recognizing women's health rights, most notably the Convention on the Elimination of All Forms of Discrimination Against Women (CEDAW) and the Southern African Development Community's (SADC) Protocol on Gender and Development. Article 12 of CEDAW calls on State Parties to eradicate gender discrimination in healthcare and provide necessary women's health services. Similarly, the SADC Protocol on Gender and Development requires State Parties to implement strategies which aim to reduce maternal mortality rates and increase the availability of sanitation facilities.

Zambia has also ratified the Protocol to the African Charter on Human and Peoples' Rights on the Rights of Women in Africa, also known as the Maputo Protocol. Article 14 of the Maputo Protocol outlines a woman's right to an abortion.

Additionally, as a member of the United Nations, the Government of Zambia is committed to efforts to achieve the Sustainable Development Goals (SDGs), which are UN-wide targets to address global issues by 2030. Specifically, SDGs 3 and 5 address maternal health care, sexual rights, and reproductive health rights, among other things.

=== Contraceptives and family planning ===
The Government of Zambia has instituted multiple policies to improve access to contraceptives and family planning services. The 2005 Reproductive Health Policy ensures public health facilities provide free contraceptives, while the 2006 Zambia Family Planning National Guidelines provide instruction to healthcare workers on offering family planning advice and assistance. Reproductive health campaigns disseminated via radio and television by both the government and civil society groups have led to an increase in contraceptive use.

The use of modern contraceptives among women in Zambia has reached 45% as of 2014. Injectables are the most commonly used form of contraceptives, followed by implants and pills. However, lack of access to contraceptives is still high among girls in child marriages, and there is a significant difference in access to contraceptives across class and geographic boundaries. Nearly 45% of rural women use modern contraceptives, in comparison to nearly 55% of urban women. The difference between non-educated women and educated women is even greater, with a little over 35% of non-educated women using modern contraceptives versus roughly 60% of educated women. Women beyond the typical child-bearing age in Zambia, defined as women aged 35 or above, have the highest rates of unmet need for family planning across age groups.

=== Maternal health care ===
Women in Zambia give birth to an average of 4.7 children. However, birth rates are higher for rural, poorer, and non-educated women than their urban, wealthier, and educated counterparts. 29% of Zambian girls between ages 15 and 19 have given birth or are pregnant; again, girls in rural areas are twice as likely to have children during this period in comparison to their urban counterparts. Pregnancy complications increase among women aged 35 or above, as they are considered beyond the typical child-bearing years in Zambia, and are less likely to seek maternal health care as a result.

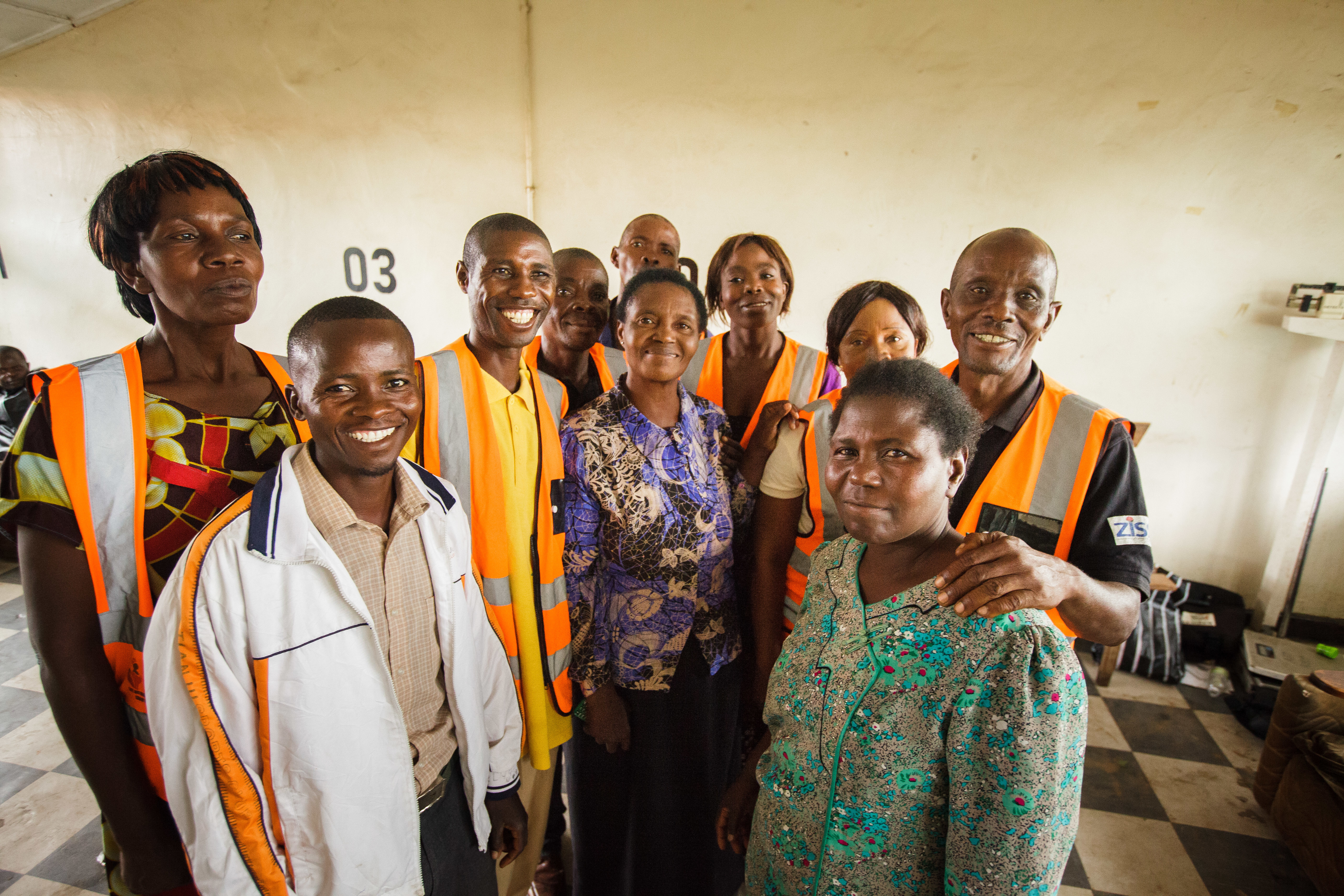
Attendees at a Safe Motherhood Action Group meeting in Samfya, Zambia.

The Government of Zambia has implemented multiple programs to decrease the maternal mortality rate (MMR), including the Campaign for Accelerated Reduction of Maternal Mortality (CARMMA) and the volunteer-based Safe Motherhood Action Groups (SMAGS). CARMMA, an African Union and United Nations Population Fund initiative, seeks to lower MMRs by designing and implementing more integrated health systems with greater funding for family services. Similarly, SMAGs are community groups that aim to decrease maternal mortality by recruiting volunteers to assist expecting mothers with identifying their medical needs and accessing care facilities. CARMMA, SMAGS, and similar efforts have shown promising results; the MMR in Zambia has decreased from 729 deaths per 100,000 women in 2001 to 398 deaths in 2014. However, the MMR has remained high due to the scarcity of health facilities, shortages of medical professionals and equipment, and women's limited access to economic resources.

Section 15A(1) of the Employment Act provides for maternity leave for all women.

=== Abortion services and post abortion care ===
Despite being legalized in 1972 through the Termination of Pregnancy Act, abortion remains a controversial subject in Zambia. Christian churches have considerable political influence in Zambia, and the Catholic Church protested the passing of the bill in 1972. In 1991, President Frederick Chiluba declared Zambia a Christian nation. Following this, the discussion of abortion became taboo. Many Zambians attributed this to the conflict between existing law and the nation's official Christian identity.

In 2015, there was an unsuccessful attempt to amend the Zambian Bill of Rights to specify that life begins at conception. In general, awareness regarding the legality of abortion and access to abortion services remains low among the Zambian public.

Per the Termination of Pregnancy Act, abortion is allowed if it is determined:

"(a) that the continuance of the pregnancy would involve-

1. (i) risk to the life of the pregnant woman; or
2. (ii) risk of injury to the physical or mental health of the pregnant woman; or
3. (iii) risk of injury to the physical or mental health of any existing children of the pregnant woman;

greater than if the pregnancy were terminated; or

(b) that there is a substantial risk that if the child were born it would suffer from such physical or mental abnormalities as to be seriously handicapped."

Furthermore, the Penal Code was amended in 2005 to provide for abortion in cases of pregnancy resulting from rape or child abuse.

However, the number of unsafe abortions performed in Zambia remains high. Only 5% of health care facilities in the country offer abortion services. Rural areas reported the lowest rates of safe abortions performed in a health care facility and also reported the highest rates of postoperative care due to complications from unsafe abortions. 30% of maternal deaths in Zambia are associated with unsafe abortions. Studies in Zambia have shown that male involvement in the process of seeking abortion services increases a women's ability to obtain a safe abortion or receive post-abortion care due to men's greater access to financial and educational resources.

=== HIV/AIDS ===
The Government of Zambia has instituted several policies and programs intended to reduce the number of annual HIV infections and provide support for those living with HIV/AIDS. Namely, the National AIDS Strategic Framework 2017-2021, Adolescent Health Strategy 2017-2021, and the Elimination of Mother-to-Child Transmission of HIV and Syphilis Plan 2018-2022 provide HIV prevention and treatment to vulnerable groups, such as children and pregnant women. The overarching goal of these programs is to reach the 90-90-90 treatment targets set by the UNAIDS Programme, which are:

- 90% of all HIV Positive people will know their status
- 90% of those with HIV will be on antiretroviral medication
- 90% of those being treated will have viral suppression

As of 2018, 1,200,000 Zambians were infected with HIV. This is roughly 11% of the adult population. New HIV infections are decreasing, and deaths related to AIDS have been cut by over a third between 2010 and 2017. Of those adults living with HIV, 78% are on some form of treatment.

58.33% of those diagnosed with HIV in Zambia are women. Among women, HIV rates are higher for educated, wealthier, and urban women. Antiretroviral medication is commonly used to prevent the transmission of infection from HIV positive mothers to their newborns.

A significant portion of the Zambian population has been exposed to radio and television programming on HIV/AIDS prevention and awareness. This programming has been less impactful on women than men. However, knowledge of HIV prevention methods is still fairly high among Zambian women, at 80%, and women are more likely than men to get tested.

=== Water and sanitation facilities ===
Both the quality and distance of water and sanitation facilities significantly impacts women's wellbeing. Improved sanitation facilities, as defined by the World Health Organization, are "facilities that hygienically separate human excreta from human contact." Clean water and improved sanitation facilities prevent the spread of communicable diseases, improve health during menstruation and pregnancy, and help women to care for their children and other vulnerable family members. Distance to clean water and sanitation facilities also impacts women's safety, as girls and women are vulnerable to harassment or violence when traveling frequently for access to basic facilities.

Sanitation coverage in Zambia has regressed from 52% to 43% between 2009 and 2015. As of 2017, only 14% of Zambian households had handwashing facilities in their home. There is a significant difference in sanitation coverage between urban and rural areas.

== Violence against women ==
Violence against women occurs in a variety of forms in Zambia. According to the Zambian Demographic and Health Survey of 2007, 47% of Zambian women have been victims of physical violence, and 10% have been victims of sexual violence. Girls are particularly vulnerable to harassment or violence during their commute to school. Abuse of detained women is also an ongoing issue.

The Government of Zambia passed the Anti-Gender Based Violence Act in 2011. The bill provides for shelters and protective orders for abuse victims.

=== Domestic violence ===
Domestic violence is a significant issue in Zambia. The 2005 Zambia Sexual Behaviour Study found that 54% of women have suffered from physical, sexual, or emotional abuse at the hands of a partner or spouse. The actual percentage is likely even higher, as domestic violence is underreported for a variety of reasons, including social stigma, family pressures, economic dependence on the abuser, and lack of access to formal complaint methods. Additionally, some women experience abuse at the hands of their spouses' families because of the perception that abuse is justified due to the families having paid a bride price, or lobola, for the woman. Attitudes towards domestic violence are split: 60% of women and 50% of men in Zambia have indicated in surveys that they believe a husband may beat his wife under certain circumstances.

=== Female genital mutilation and cutting ===
Female genital mutilation and/or cutting is prohibited by law in Zambia. It is not widely practiced in the country.

=== Child marriage ===
Child marriage is very common in Zambia. In 2015, of women aged 20–24, 31.4% were married before the age of 18. Child marriage rates are higher in rural areas and among less educated and impoverished girls.

Zambian Administrative Provinces.

The practice is most common in the Northern Province and Copperbelt Province.

Zambia has a dual legal system, and statutory and customary law in the country conflict on the issue of child marriage. Article 266 of the Constitution of Zambia defines adulthood as 19 years of age and above. Furthermore, according to the Marriage Act, all parties must be aged 21 or older at the time of marriage. Parental consent is required for marriages below the age of 21, and a judge's consent is required for marriages below the age of 16. However, customary law uses a different set of parameters to determine eligibility for marriage, including the completion of puberty, parental consent, the exchange of a lobola (bride price), and a ceremony or ritual signifying the marriage. Thus, customary law recognizes a wider scope of marriages than statutory law, including many child marriages.

The Government of Zambia established a committee on child marriage within the Ministry of Gender and adopted the National Strategy on Ending Child Marriage 2016-21, which aims to reduce child marriage in Zambia by 40%.

=== Human trafficking ===
The Government of Zambia passed the Anti-Human Trafficking Act in 2008. The Act establishes the Committee on Human Trafficking and the Human Trafficking Fund, as well as outlines victim support services. Human trafficking carries a minimum penalty of twenty years and a maximum of thirty.

== See also ==
- Women in Africa
