= Zaw Min (politician, born 1949) =

Burmese politician

Member of the Amyotha Hluttaw
- Incumbent
- Assumed office 3 February 2016
- Constituency: Sagaing Region № 6

Personal details
- Born: 17 July 1949 (age 77) Mogok, Myanmar
- Party: National League for Democracy
- Spouse: Khin Myint Naing
- Children: Nanda Min Naing; Sandi Min Naing
- Parent(s): Chit Swe (father); Sann Yi (mother)
- Education: Rangoon University

Zaw Min (Burmese: ဇော်မင်း, also spelt Zaw Minn; born 17 July 1949) is a Burmese politician who currently serves as an Amyotha Hluttaw member of parliament for Sagaing Township No. 6 Constituency.

== Early life and education ==
Zaw Minn was born on 17 July 1949 Mogok, Myanmar. He graduated with B.A (Law) from Rangoon University. In 1979–1987, he worked as a lawyer of the Supreme Court of Myanmar at Katha Township, and also worked as merchants at Yangon in 1989.

== Political career ==
He is a member of the National League for Democracy Party politician, he was elected as Amyotha Hluttaw representative for Sagaing Region No. 6 parliamentary constituency.
