= Palaw =

Town in Tanintharyi Region, Myanmar

Palaw Township ပုလောမြို့
- Township
- Location in Myanmar
- Coordinates: 12.9597°N 98.6545°E
- Country: Myanmar
- Region: Tanintharyi Region
- District: Myeik District
- Township: Palaw Township
- Seat: Palaw

Area
  - Total: 2.73 sq mi (7.1 km^{2})

Population (2019)
  - Total: 22,267
  - Density: 8,160/sq mi (3,150/km^{2})
- Time zone: UTC+6.30 (MMT)

Palaw (Burmese: ပုလောမြို့, Thai: ปะลอ) is a town in the Tanintharyi Region, Myanmar. It is the administrative seat of Palaw Township.

In 1948, a Bamar militia group threw hand-grenades into a Christmas Eve service in Palaw and killed 80 ethnic Karen churchgoers. This incident and existing interracial tensions sparked a series of retaliatory incidents and massacres between Bamar and Karen ethnic groups that culminated in the declaration of the Karen conflict war by the Karen National Union.
