= Zaw Min (minister) =

Burmese politician (born 1951)

- ဇော်မင်း

Minister for Electric Power-1 of Myanmar
- In office 30 March 2011 – 28 August 2012
- Succeeded by: Khin Maung Soe

Member of the Pyithu Hluttaw
- In office 31 January 2011 – 30 March 2011
- Preceded by: Constituency established
- Succeeded by: Myint Thein (NLD)
- Constituency: Magway Township
- Majority: 106,900 (68.87%)

Personal details
- Born: 30 October 1951 (age 74) Pegu, Burma
- Party: Union Solidarity and Development Party
- Spouse: Khin Mi Mi

Military service
- Allegiance: Myanmar
- Branch/service: Myanmar Army
- Years of service: -2010
- Rank: Colonel

Zaw Min (Burmese: ဇော်မင်း) was the Minister for Electric Power-1 of Myanmar (Burma). A retired Colonel in the Myanmar Army, he resigned his ministerial position 28 August 2012.

== Shooting incidents in 1998 ==
In May 1998, Colonel Zaw Min landed on Christie Island and found 59 people living there to gather wood and bamboo, in violation of Burmese law. Senior General Than Shwe ordered them to be "eliminated" and all were subsequently murdered by Zaw Min's soldiers. Several days later, the 22-man crew of a Thai fishing boat that strayed into Burmese waters were also executed and their bodies buried on Christie Island.

== Personal life ==
He is married to Khin Mi Mi.
