= Myeik District =

District in Tanintharyi Region, Myanmar

Coordinates: 12°25′N 99°03′E

Myeik District (Burmese: မြိတ်ခရိုင်) is a district in the Tanintharyi Region of Burma (Myanmar). The district covers an area of 18,121 km^{2}, and had a population of 693,087 at the 2014 Census.

Location in Tanintharyi region

== Administrative divisions ==
=== Townships ===
The district contains the following townships:

- Myeik Township (population 284,489; area 1,217 km^{2})
- Kyunsu Township (population 171,753; area 3,137 km^{2})
- Palaw Township (population 129,992; area 2,404 km^{2})
- Taninthayi Township (population 106,853; area 11,363 km^{2})

=== Subtownships ===
- Palauk Subtownship
