= Mergui Archipelago =

Archipelago in far southern Myanmar

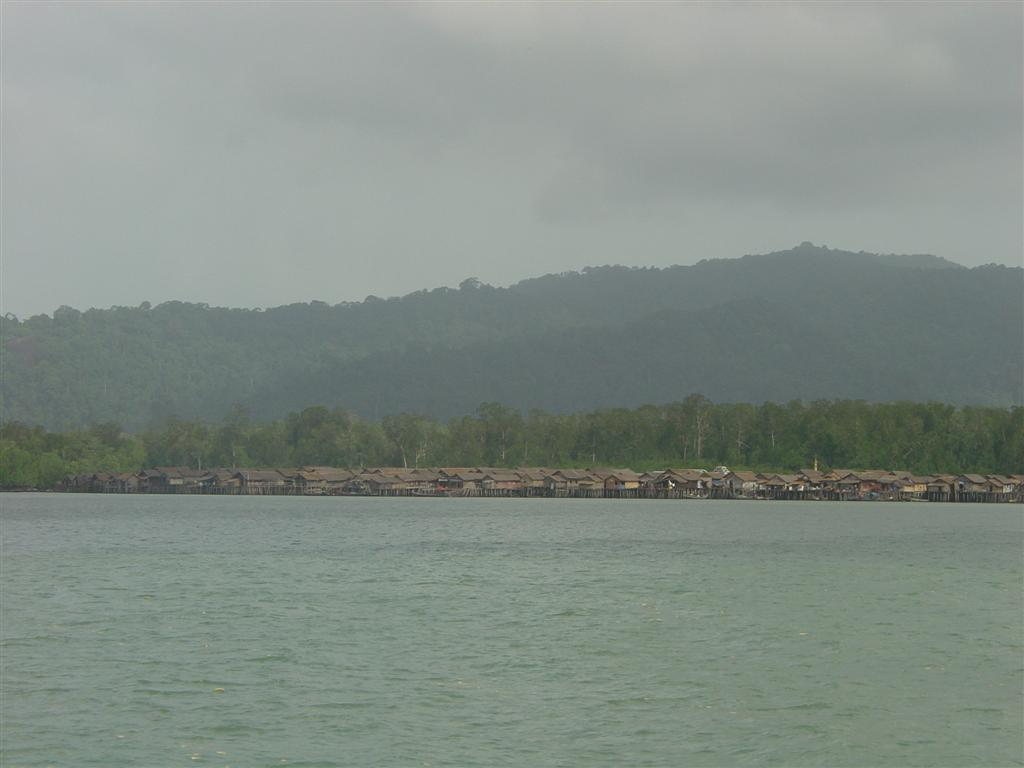
- Village in the Mergui Archipelago

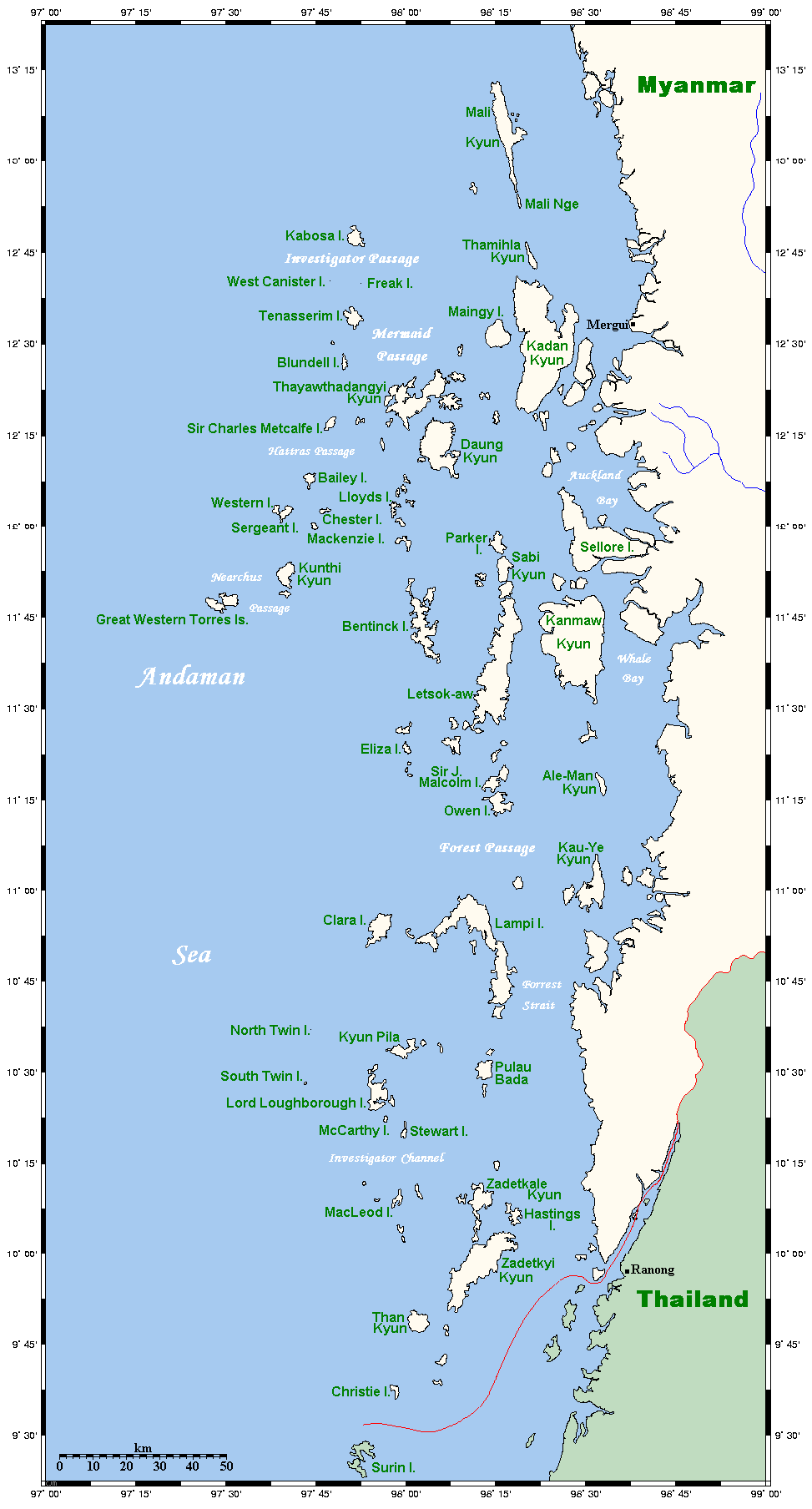
- Map of Mergui Archipelago

- Location of Mergui Archipelago in Myanmar

Geography
- Coordinates: 11°30′N 98°13′E
- Adjacent to: Andaman Sea

Administration
- Myanmar
- Region: Tanintharyi

Demographics
- Ethnic groups: Moken • Malay

The Mergui Archipelago (also Myeik Archipelago or Myeik Kyunzu; Burmese: မြိတ်ကျွန်းစု) is located in far southern Myanmar (Burma) and is part of the Tanintharyi Region. It consists of around 800 islands, varying in size from very small to hundreds of square kilometres, all lying in the Andaman Sea off the western shore of the Malay Peninsula near its landward (northern) end where it joins the rest of Indochina. They are occasionally referred to as the Pashu Islands because the Malay inhabitants are locally called Pashu.

== Environment ==
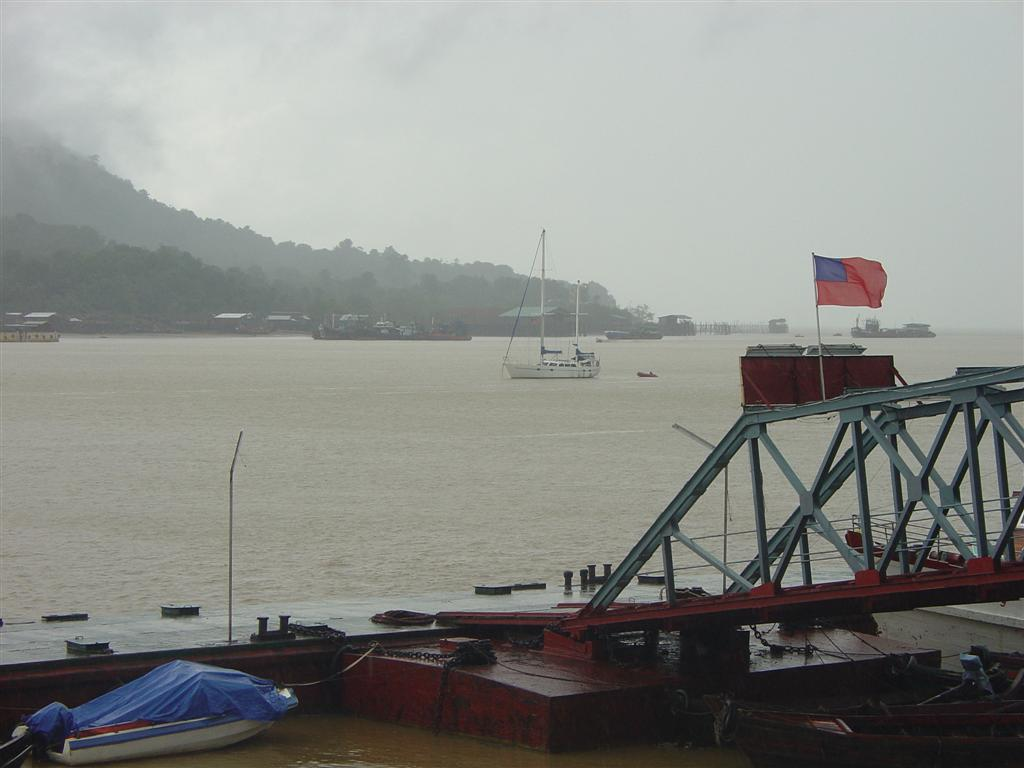
Port of Myeik

Geologically, the islands are characterized mainly by limestone and granite. They are generally covered with thick tropical growth, including rainforest, and their shorelines are punctuated by beaches, rocky headlands, and in some places, mangrove swamps. Offshore are extensive coral reefs.

The archipelago's virtual isolation from most of mankind's influence on the natural environment has given the islands and the surrounding waters of the Andaman Sea a great diversity of flora and fauna, contributing to the region's growing popularity as a diving destination, home to endangered megafauna, such as whale sharks and dugongs.

The area is also important for migrating cetaceans and the "Whale Bay" in the east of Kanmaw Kyun was named for the historical presence of a large number of whales. Such variety includes a resident population of Bryde's whales, occasional blue whales, longman's beaked whales, strap-toothed whales, and killer whales, dolphins, finless porpoises, and Irrawaddy dolphins.

On the islands themselves, various animals thrive, including deer, monkeys, tropical birds including hornbills, and wild swine. There are even unconfirmed reports of Sumatran rhinoceros on Lanbi, one of the bigger islands, but this has been widely discredited.

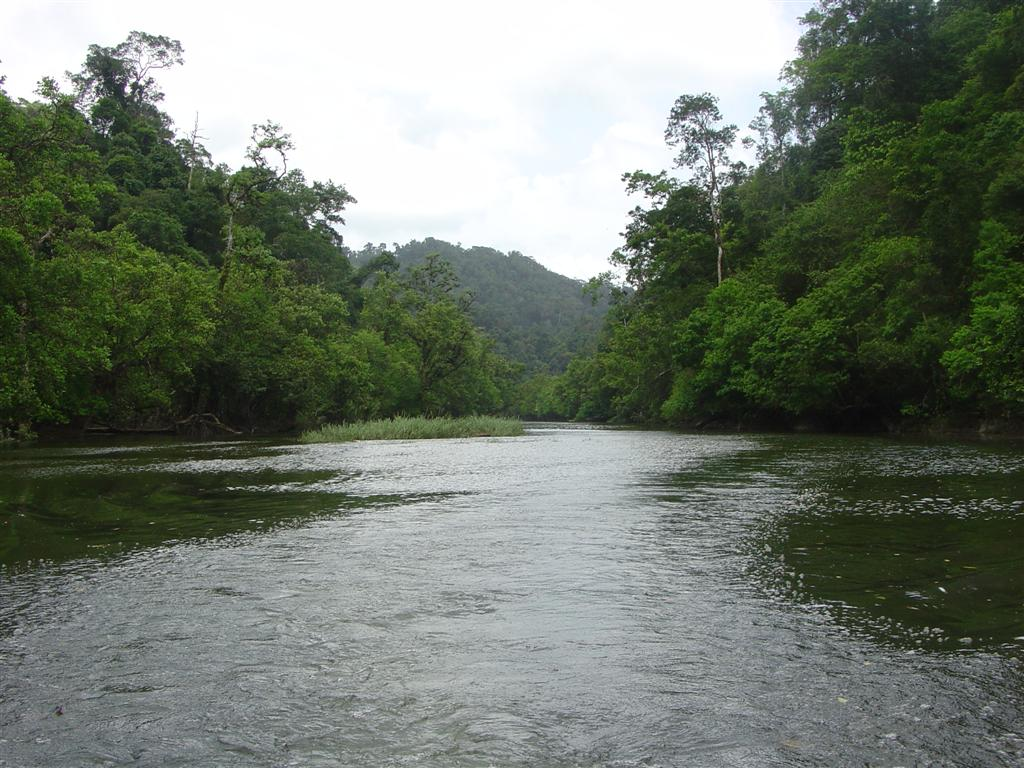
River on Lanbi Kyun

Environmental threats to the region include overfishing and also blast fishing.

== Geography ==
The largest and highest island is Kadan Kyun at 767 metres across the inland channel from Myeik. Other important islands are:

- Auriol Island
- Bentinck Kyun
- Christie Island, the southernmost island of the group
- Daung Kyun
- Kabosa Island
- Kadan Kyun
- Kanmaw Kyun
- Lanbi Kyun
- Letsok-aw Kyun
- Mali Kyun, the northernmost island of the group
- Money Island
- Sabi Island
- Saganthit Kyun
- Tenasserim Island
- Thahtay Kyun
- Than Kyun
- Thayawthadangyi
- Zadetkyi

== History ==
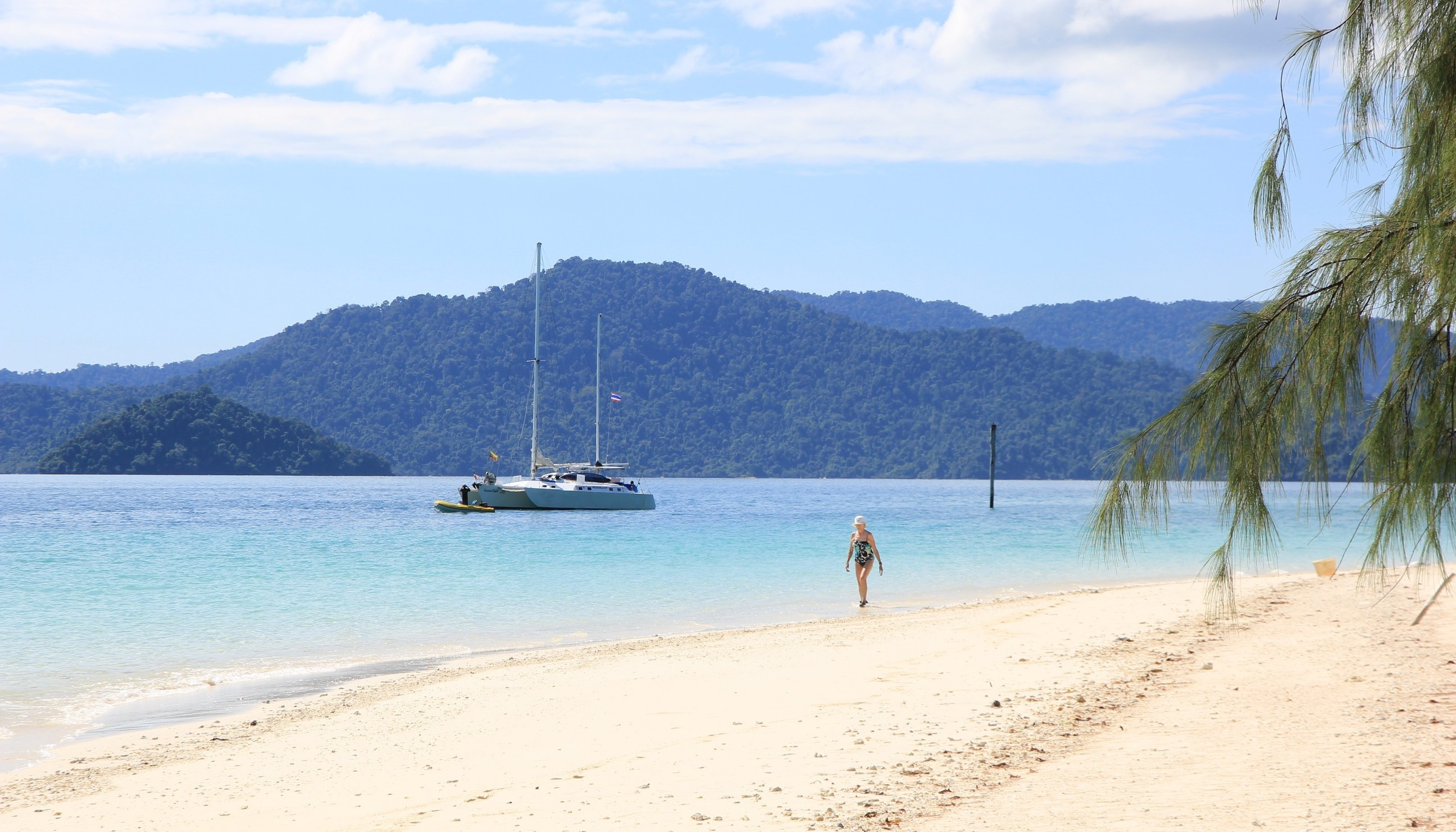
Beach in the Myeik Archipelago

The archipelago was likely first settled by Malay sailors who arrived from the south. However, it remained largely uninhabited until the 20th century. Malays and Chinese traders used the inner waters to escape the southwest monsoon, while larger ships avoided the complicated maritime geography. Pirates and slavers also used it as a refuge, because it was almost impossible to control. For this reason, the Moken people found refuge here until the modern world intervened. The islands began to be accurately charted only after British occupation in 1824. First, Captain Ross surveyed the outer islands in the late 1820s, followed by Captain Lloyd in the inner islands in the late 1830s. Also at that time, between 1838 and 1840, Dr. Johann W. Helfer explored all aspects of the archipelago on behalf of the East India Company. A transcription of his journal, along with interactive maps showing his routes, is listed below in the external links.

== Population ==
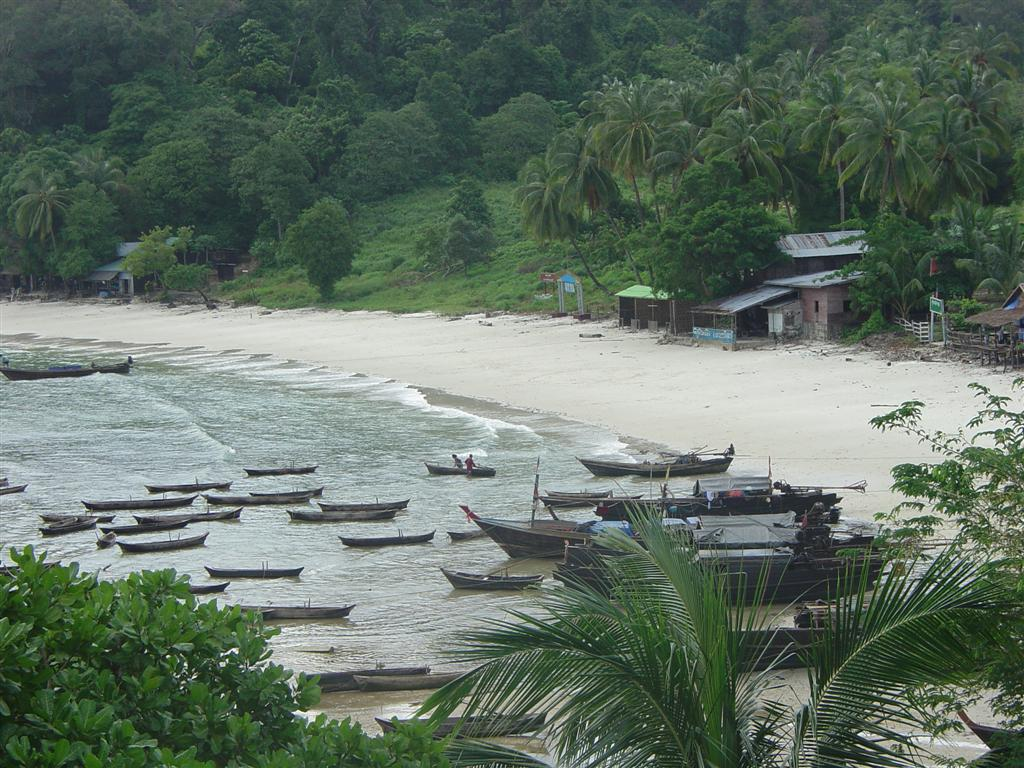
Moken Village

The local people are an ethnic minority called the Moken, sometimes known as Sea Gypsies, although this term actually covers several groups in Southeast Asia. They are a sea-dwelling people and they follow a traditional way of life, doing things such as fishing and building boats very much the way they have done for centuries. They can be found living on their traditional boats during the dry season, but usually keep to land in the rainy season. The Moken claim that the islands were detached from the mainland after a great mythological flood.

== Violence by the military regime in the archipelago ==
The Mergui Archipelago is located in Tanintharyi Region, one of the regions heavily impacted by violence during the Myanmar conflict. Violence in the Mergui archipelago has often targeted civilians including the massacres of fishermen and the entire population of the picturesque Christie Island.

== Tourism ==
The area was only opened up to foreign tourism in 1997 after negotiations between Myanmar and dive operators from Phuket in Thailand. The best diving conditions exist from December to April, with whale sharks and manta rays visiting from February to May. A five-star casino and golf resort, the Andaman Club now operates on Thahtay Kyun.

== In popular culture ==
- In the 1965 James Bond film Thunderball, Ernst Stavro Blofeld demands that NATO pay the international criminal organization SPECTRE a ransom of white flawless diamonds worth £100 million to be deposited in the Mergui Archipelago off the coast of Myanmar.
- The Mergui Archipelago has appeared in several of W.E. Johns's "Biggles" books: Biggles – Air Commodore (1937), Biggles Delivers the Goods (1946), and Biggles and the Lost Sovereigns (1964).
