= Adimurai =

Tamil martial art

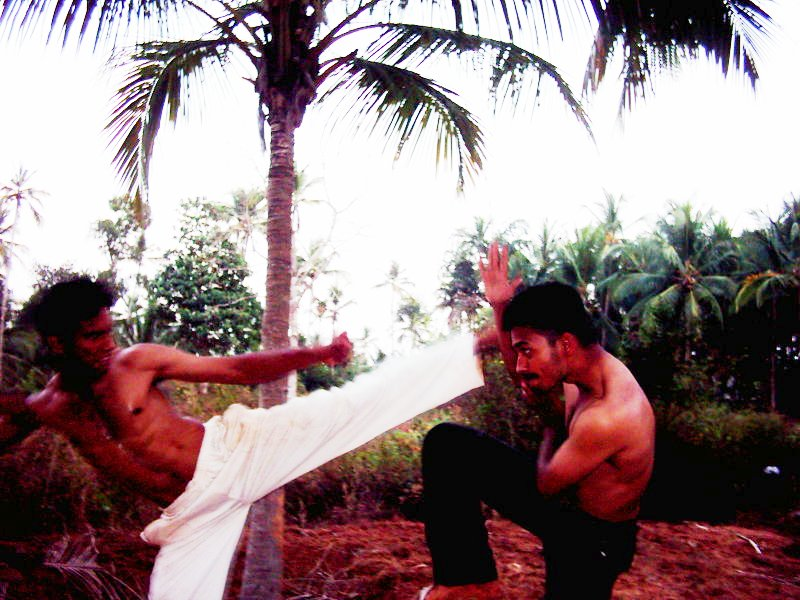
- Adimurai mock combat
- Also known as: Adithada
- Focus: Striking, blocking
- Hardness: Full-contact, semi-contact
- Country of origin: India
- Creator: Traditionally Siddhars
- Olympic sport: No
- Meaning: Law of hitting

Adimurai is an Indian martial art originating in modern-day Tamil Nadu, the southernmost region in India. It was traditionally practiced in the Tirunelveli district, Kanyakumari district of modern-day Tamil Nadu and parts of Northern Sri Lanka as well as nearby areas in southeastern Kerala. Its preliminary empty-hand techniques are called Adithadai and application of vital points are called Varma Adi, although these terms are sometimes interchangeably used to refer to the martial art itself. Adimurai is a portmanteau in the Tamil language where adi means "to hit or strike" and murai means method or procedure. In modern period it is used alongside other Tamil martial arts.

== History ==
Adithadi is a non-lethal version of Adimurai which was developed in the Tamilnadu region of ancient India. It saw most of its practice in the Chola and Pandya kingdoms, where preliminary empty hand techniques were used.

== Practice ==
Adimurai is traditionally practiced outdoors or in unroofed areas. It is mainly practiced by, Kallars, and Nadars of southern Tamil Nadu. Techniques include strictly punching, basic kicking and basic blocking.

== In popular culture ==
Adimurai was depicted in the film Pattas (2020) starring Dhanush, directed by R. S. Durai Senthilkumar.

== See also ==
- Angampora
- Banshay
- Bataireacht
- Bōjutsu
- Gatka
- Jūkendō
- Kalaripayattu
- Kendo
- Kenjutsu
- Krabi–krabong
- Kuttu Varisai
- Mardani khel
- Silambam
- Silambam Asia
- Tahtib
- Thang-ta
- Varma kalai
- World Silambam Association
- Silat
- Kbachkun boraan
- Shaolin kung fu
- karate
- Taekwondo
