= Indian martial arts =

Fighting systems of the Indian subcontinent

Indian martial arts refers to the fighting systems of the Indian subcontinent. A variety of terms are used for the English phrases "Indian martial arts", deriving from ancient sources. While they may seem to imply specific disciplines (e.g. archery, armed combat), by Classical times they were used generically for all fighting systems.

Among the most common terms today, śastra-vidyā, is a compound of the words śastra (weapon) and vidyā (knowledge). Dhanurveda derives from the words for bow (dhanushya) and knowledge (veda), the "science of archery" in Puranic literature, later applied to martial arts in general. The Vishnu Purana text describes dhanurveda as one of the traditional eighteen branches of "applied knowledge" or upaveda, along with shastrashāstra or military science. A later term, yuddha kalā, comes from the words yuddha meaning fight or combat and kalā meaning art or skill. The related term śastra kalā (lit. weapon art) usually refers specifically to armed disciplines. Another term, yuddha-vidyā or "combat knowledge", refers to the skills used on the battlefield, encompassing not only actual fighting but also battle formations and strategy. Martial arts are usually learnt and practiced in the traditional akharas.

== History ==
=== Antiquity (pre-Gupta) ===
An Indus Valley Civilisation seal shows two men spearing one another in a duel which seem to be centered on a woman. A statue of a spear thrower was also excavated from an Indus valley site.

Dhanurveda, a section found in the Vedas (1500 BCE - 1100 BCE) contains references to martial arts. Indian epics contain the earliest accounts of combat, both armed and bare-handed. Most deities of the Hindu-Buddhist pantheon are armed with their own personal weapon, and are revered not only as master martial artists but often as originators of those systems themselves. The Mahabharata tells of fighters armed only with daggers besting lions, and describes a prolonged battle between Arjuna and Karna using bows, swords, trees, rocks and fists. Another unarmed battle in the Mahabharata describes two combatants boxing with clenched fists and fighting with kicks, finger strikes, knee strikes and headbutts.

The oldest recorded organized unarmed fighting art in the Indian subcontinent is malla-yuddha or combat-wrestling, codified into four forms in the Vedic period. Stories describing Krishna report that he sometimes engaged in wrestling matches where he used knee strikes to the chest, punches to the head, hair pulling, and strangleholds. Based on such accounts, Svinth (2002) traces press-ups and squats used by Indian wrestlers to the pre-classical era.

In Sanskrit literature the term dvandvayuddha referred to a duel, such that it was a battle between only two warriors and not armies. Epics often describe the duels between deities and god-like heroes as lasting a month or more. The malla-yuddha (wrestling match) between Bhima and Jarasandha lasts 27 days. Similarly, the dvandvayuddha between Parashurama and Bhishma lasts for 30 days, while that between Krishna and Jambavan lasts for 28 days. Likewise, the dvandvayuddha between Bali and Dundubhi, a demon in the form of a water buffalo, lasts for 45 days. The Manusmriti tells that if a warrior's topknot comes loose during such a fight or duel, the opponent must give him time to bind his hair before continuing.

The Charanavyuha authored by Shaunaka mentions four upaveda (applied Vedas). Included among them are archery (dhanurveda) and military sciences (shastrashastra), the mastery of which was the duty (dharma) of the warrior class. Kings usually belonged to the kshatriya (warrior) class and thus served as heads of the army. They typically practiced archery, wrestling, boxing, and swordsmanship as part of their education. Examples include such rulers as Siddhartha Gautama and Rudradaman. The Chinese monk Xuanzang writes that the emperor Harsha was light on his feet despite his advancing age and managed to dodge and seize an assailant during an assassination attempt.

Many of the popular sports mentioned in the Vedas and the epics have their origins in military training, such as boxing (musti-yuddha), wrestling (maladvandva), chariot-racing (rathachalana), horse-riding (ashva-rohana) and archery (dhanurvidya). Competitions were held not just as a contest of the players' prowess but also as a means of finding a bridegroom. Arjuna, Rama and Siddhartha Gautama all won their consorts in such tournaments.

In the 3rd century, elements from the Yoga Sutras of Patanjali, as well as finger movements in the nata dances, were incorporated into the fighting arts. A number of Indian fighting styles remain closely connected to yoga, dance and performing arts. Some of the choreographed sparring in kalaripayattu can be applied to dance and kathakali dancers who knew kalaripayattu were believed to be markedly better than other performers. Until recent decades, the chhau dance was performed only by martial artists. Some traditional Indian classical dance schools still incorporate martial arts as part of their exercise regimen.

Written evidence of martial arts in Southern India dates back to the Sangam literature of about the 2nd century BC to the 2nd century AD. The Akananuru and Purananuru describe the use of spears, swords, shields, bows and silambam in the Sangam era. The word kalari appears in the Puram (verses 225, 237, 245, 356) and Akam (verses 34, 231, 293) to describe both a battlefield and combat arena. The word kalari tatt denoted a martial feat, while kalari koḻai meant a coward in war. Each warrior in the Sangam era received regular military training in target practice and horse riding. They specialized in one or more of the important weapons of the period including the spear (vel), sword (val), shield (kedaham), and bow and arrow (vil ambu). The combat techniques of the Sangam period were the earliest precursors to kalaripayattu. References to Cilappatikaram in Sangam literature date back to the 2nd century. This referred to the silambam staff which was in great demand with foreign visitors.

The ten fighting styles of northern sastra-vidya were said to have been created in different areas based on animals and gods, and designed for the particular geography of their origin. Tradition ascribes their convergence to the 6th-century university of Takshashila, ancient India's intellectual capital. Located in present-day Punjab, Pakistan, the Ramayana ascribes the city's founding to Bharata who named it after his son Taksha. From the 7th to the 5th centuries BC it was held in high regard as a great centre of trade and learning, attracting students from throughout present-day Pakistan and northern India. Among the subjects taught were the "military sciences", and archery was one of its prime arts.

Some measures were put into place to discourage martial activity during the Buddhist period. The Khandhaka in particular forbids wrestling, boxing, archery, and swordsmanship. However, references to fighting arts are found in early Buddhist texts, such as the Lotus Sutra (c. 1st century AD) which refers to a boxing art while speaking to Manjusri. It also categorised combat techniques as joint locks, fist strikes, grapples and throws. The Lotus Sutra makes further mention of a martial art with dance-like movements called Nara. Another Buddhist sutra called Hongyo-kyo (佛本行集經) describes a "strength contest" between Gautama Buddha's half-brother Prince Nanda and his cousin Devadatta. Siddhartha Gautama himself was a champion wrestler and swordsman before becoming the Buddha.

=== Classical period (3rd to 10th centuries) ===
Like other branches of Sanskrit literature, treatises on martial arts become more systematic in the course of the 1st millennium AD. Vajra-musti, an armed grappling style, is mentioned in sources of the early centuries AD. Around this time, tantric philosophers developed important metaphysical concepts such as kundalini, chakra, and mantra.

The Sushruta Samhita (c. 4th century) identifies 108 vital points on the human body of which 64 were classified as being lethal if properly struck with a fist or stick. Sushruta's work formed the basis of the medical discipline ayurveda which was taught alongside various martial arts. With numerous other scattered references to vital points in Vedic and epic sources, it is certain that Indian subcontinent's early fighters knew and practised attacking or defending vital points.

Around 630, King Narasimhavarman of the Pallava dynasty commissioned dozens of granite sculptures showing unarmed fighters disarming armed opponents. This is similar to the style described in the Agni Purana.

Martial arts were not exclusive to the kshatriya caste, though the warrior class used them more extensively. The 8th-century text Kuvalaymala by Udyotanasuri recorded fighting techniques being taught at educational institutions, where non-kshatriya students from throughout the subcontinent "were learning and practicing archery, fighting with sword and shield, with daggers, sticks, lances, and with fists, and in duels (niyuddham)". Hindu priests of the traditional gurukula still teach unarmed fighting techniques to their students as a way of increasing stamina and training the physical body.

The Gurjara-Pratihara came into power during the 7th century and founded a kshatriya dynasty in northern India which exceeded the preceding Gupta Empire. During this period, Emperor Nagabhata I (750–780 AD) and Mihir Bhoja I (836–890) commissioned various texts on martial arts, and were themselves practitioners of these systems. Shiva Dhanuveda was composed in this era. The khadga, a two-handed broad-tipped heavy longsword, was given special preference. It was even used for khadga-puja, ritualised worship of the sword. The Gurjara-Pratiharas continuously fought off Arab invasions, particularly during the Caliphate campaigns in India. The Arab chronicler Sulaiman wrote of the Gurjara ruler as the greatest foe to Islamic expansion, while at the same time praising his cavalry.

=== Middle Ages (11th to 15th centuries) ===
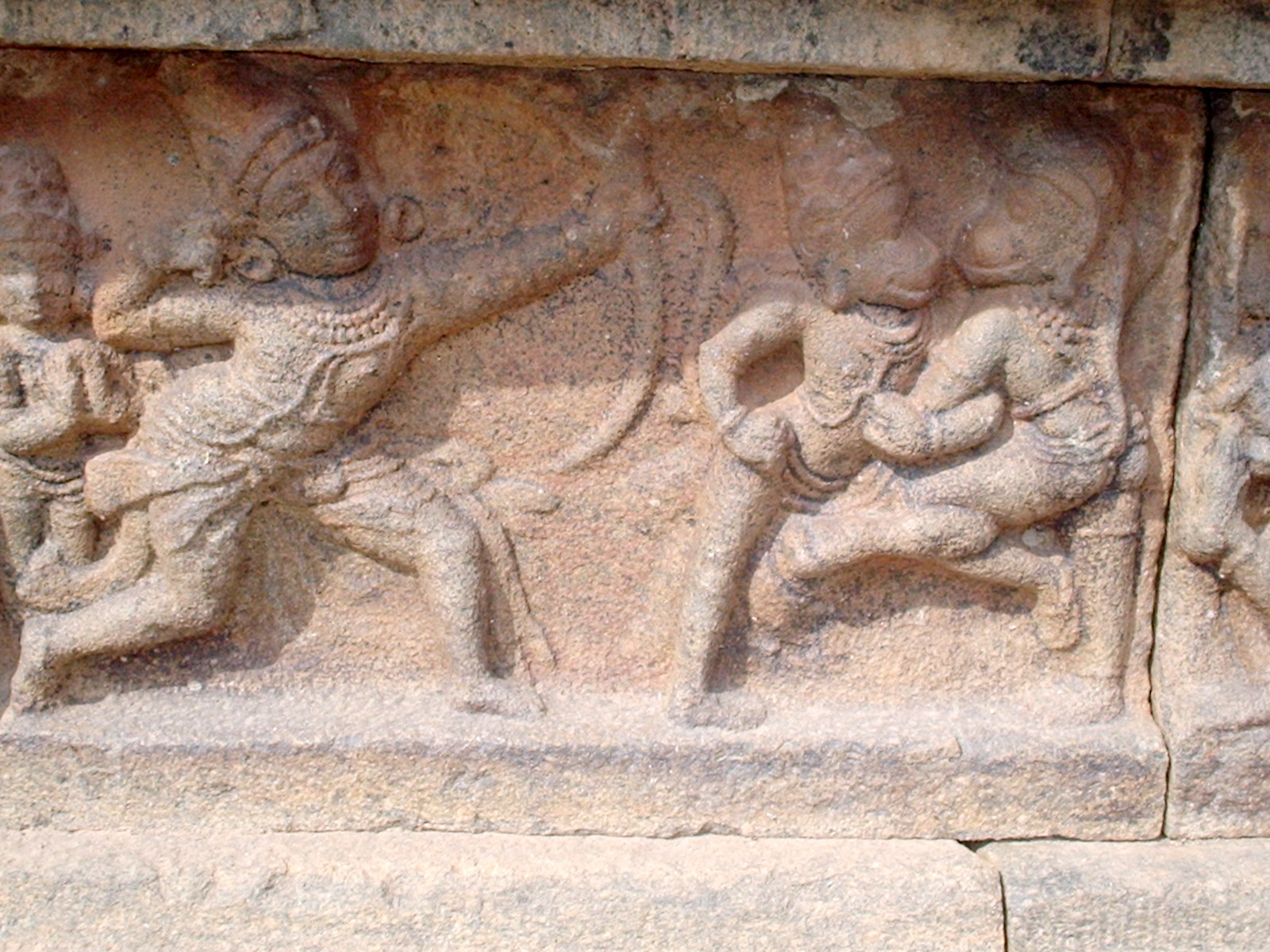
Locking technique shown at 12th century Airavatesvara Temple

Kalaripayattu had developed into its present form by the 11th century, during an extended period of warfare between the Chera and Chola dynasties. The earliest treatise discussing the techniques of malla-yuddha is the Malla Purana (c. 13th century), unlike the earlier Manasollasa which gives the names of movements but no descriptions.

Over a period of several centuries, invading Muslim armies managed to occupy much of present-day Pakistan and northern India. In response to the spread of Muslim rule, the kingdoms of South India united in the 14th century to found the Vijayanagara Empire. Physical culture was given much attention by both royalty and commoners in the empire, with wrestling being particularly popular with both men and women. Gymnasiums have been discovered inside royal quarters of Vijayanagara, and records speak of regular physical training for commanders and their armies during peacetime. Royal palaces and market places had special arenas where royalty and common people alike amused themselves by watching matches such as cockfights, ram fights, and wrestling. One account describes an akhara in Chandragiri where noblemen practiced jumping exercises, boxing, fencing and wrestling almost every day before dinner to maintain their health, and observed that "men as old as seventy years look only thirty".

The Italian traveller Pietro Della Valle wrote of cane-fighting in southern India. According to Pietro, it was the custom for soldiers to specialise in their own particular weapon of expertise and never use any other even during war, "thereby becoming very expert and well practised in that which he takes to".

As their ancient predecessors, swordplay and wrestling were commonly practiced by the royalty of Vijayanagara. Krishnadevaraya is said to have arranged a duel between a champion swordsman and the prince of Odisha who was known for being an expert with both the sword and dagger. The prince accepted the challenge until he learned he would be fighting one not of royal blood and so killed himself rather than having to "soil his hands". Fernao Nunes and the Persian envoy Abd al-Razzaq relate that Deva Raya II survived an assassination attempt "as he was a man who knew how to use both sword and dagger better than anyone in his kingdom, avoided by twists and turns of his body the thrusts aimed at him, freed himself from him, and slew him with a short sword that he had".

=== Mughal era (1526–1857) ===
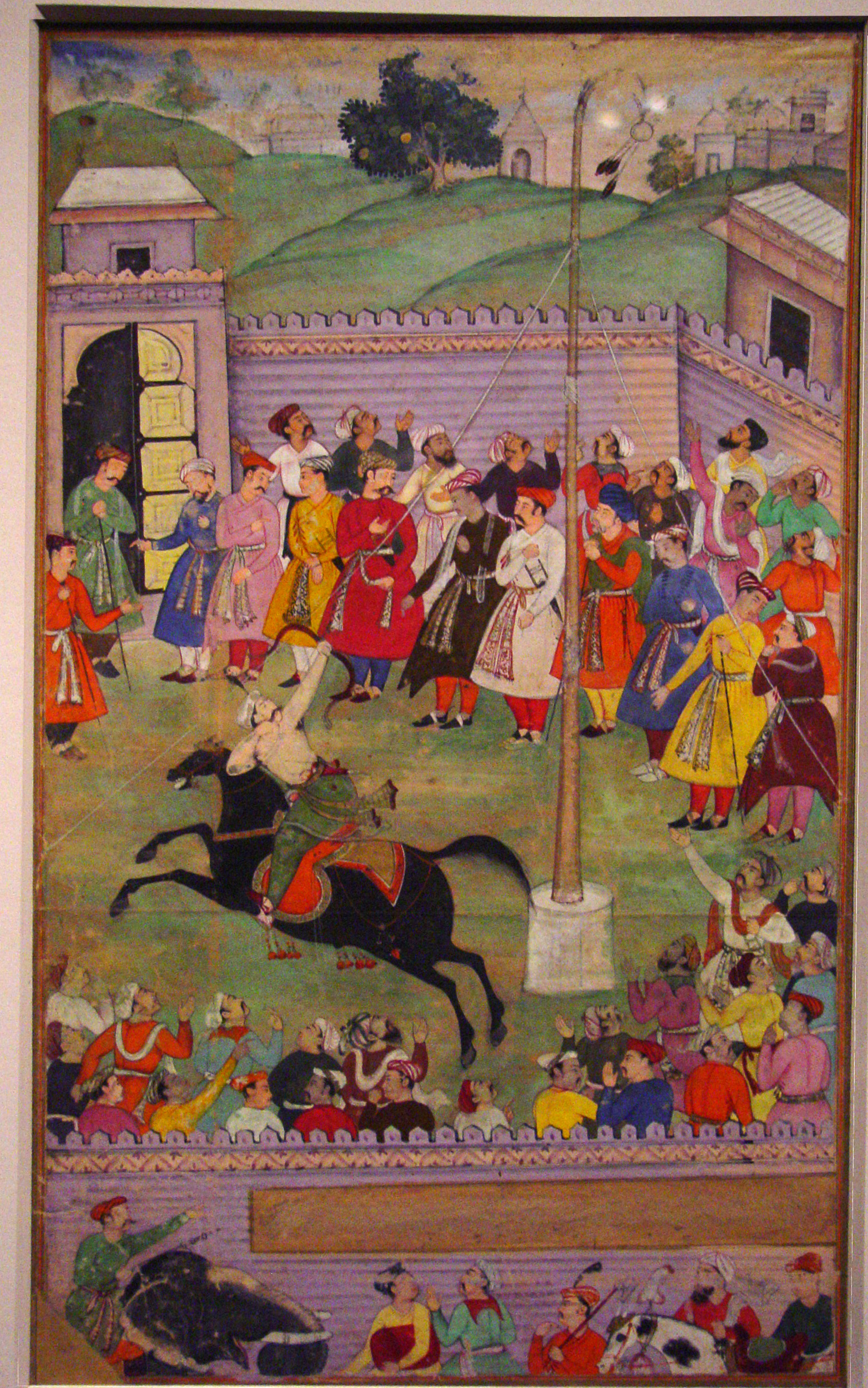
Mughal warriors practicing horseback archery, a skill they were highly renowned for

After a series of victories, the Central Asian conqueror Babur established Mughal rule in north India during the 16th century. The Mughals were patrons of India's native arts, not only recruiting akhara-trained Rajput fighters for their armies but even practicing these systems themselves. The Ausanasa Dhanurveda Sankalanam dates to the late 16th century, compiled under the patronage of Akbar. The Ain-i-Akbari tells that the Mughal court had various kinds of fighting men from around the empire who would demonstrate their skills every day in exchange for rewards. Among them were said to be both native and Mughal wrestlers, slingers from Gujarat, Hindustani athletes, boxers, stone-throwers and many others.

"There are several kinds of gladiators, each performing astonishing feats. In fighting they show much speed and agility and blend courage and skill in squatting down and rising up again. Some of them use shields in fighting, others use cudgels. Others again use no means of defence, and fight with one hand only; these are called ek-hath. Those who come from the eastern districts of Hindostan use a small shield called "chirwah". Those from the southern provinces have shields of such magnitude as to cover a man and a horse. This kind of shield is called tilwah. Another class use a shield somewhat less than the height of a man. Some again use a long sword, and seizing it with both hands they perform extraordinary feats of skill. There is another famous class called Bankúlis. They have no shield but make use of a peculiar kind of sword which, though curved towards the point, is straight near the handle. They wield it with great dexterity. The skill that they exhibit passes all description. Others are skillful in fighting with daggers and knives of various forms; of these there are upwards of a hundred thousand. Each class has a different name; they also differ in their performances. At court, there are a thousand gladiators always in readiness."

Avid hunters, a popular sport among the Mughals was shikar or tiger-hunting. While often done with arrows and later even rifles, it was considered most impressive to kill a tiger with a hand-to-hand weapon such as a sword or dagger. A warrior who managed to best a tiger would be awarded the title of Pachmar.

In the 16th century, Madhusudana Saraswati of Bengal organised a section of the Naga tradition of armed sannyasi in order to protect Hindus from the intolerant Mughal rulers. Although generally said to abide by the principle of non-violence (ahimsā), these Dashanami monks had long been forming akhara for the practice of both yoga and martial arts. Such warrior-ascetics have been recorded from 1500 to as late as the 18th century, although tradition attributes their creation to the 8th-century philosopher Adi Shankara. They began as a stratum of Rajput warriors who would gather after harvest and arm peasants into militarised units, effectively acting as a self-defense squad. Prevalent in Rajasthan, Maharashtra and Bengal, they would give up their occupations and leave their families to live as mercenaries. Naga sadhu today rarely practice any form of fighting other than wrestling, but still carry trishula, swords, canes and spears. To this day their retreats are called chhauni or armed camps, and they have been known to hold mock jousts among themselves. As recently as the 1950s, it was not unusual for Naga sadhu to strike to kill someone over issues of honour.

There is also a 17th-century Dhanurveda-samhita attributed to Vasistha.

The pehlwani style of wrestling developed in the Mughal Empire by combining native malla-yuddha with influences from Persian varzesh-e bastani.

=== Maratha dynasty (1674–1859) ===
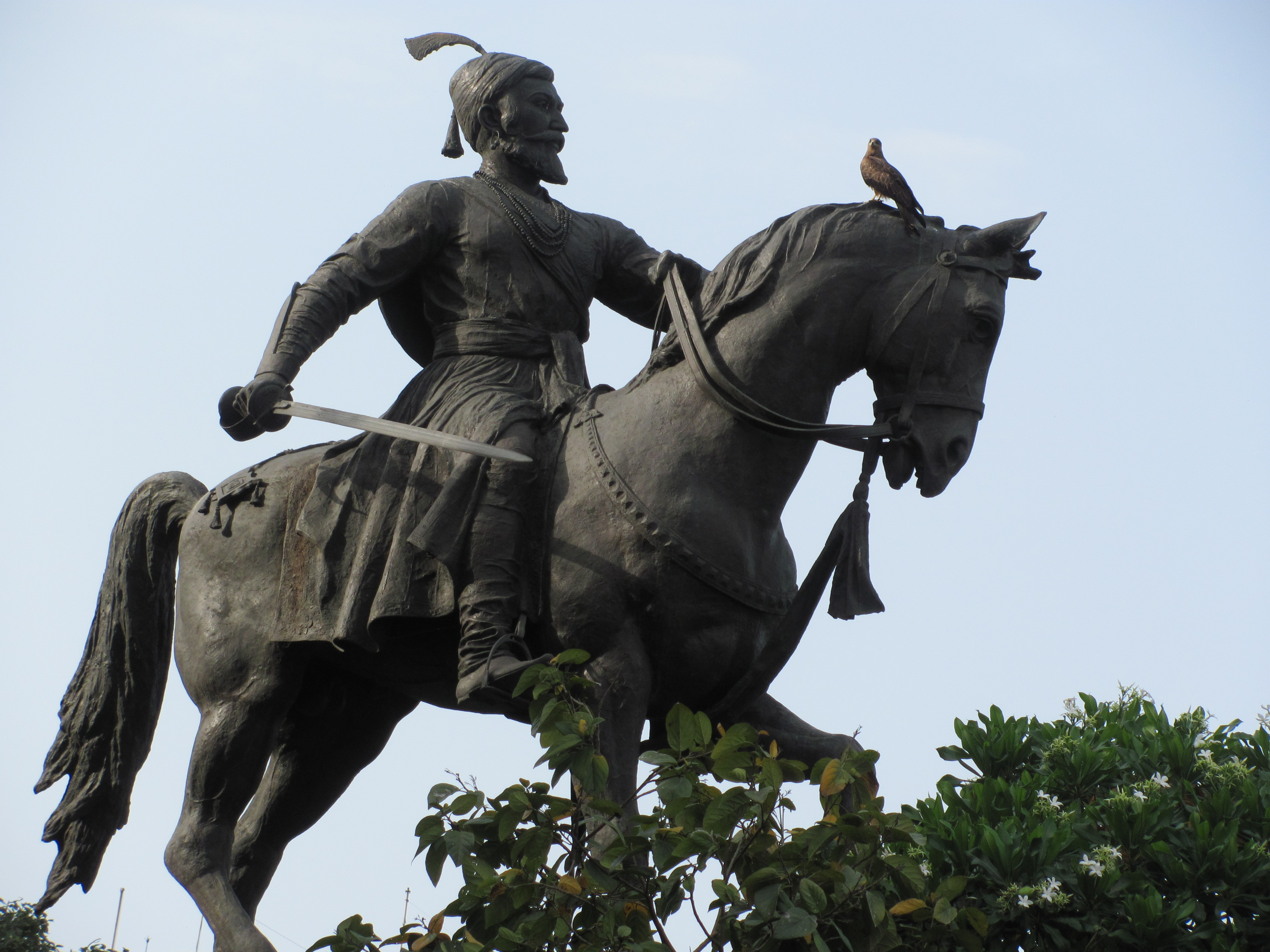
Statue of Shivaji, the warrior-king who brought the Maratha people and fighting style to prominence.

Coming from a hilly region characterized by valleys and caves, the Marathas became expert horsemen who favoured light armour and highly mobile cavalry units during war. Known especially as masters of swords and spears, their heavily martial culture and propensity for the lance is mentioned as early as the 7th century by Xuanzang. After serving the Dakshin sultanates of the early 17th century, the scattered Marathas united to found their own kingdom under the warrior Shivaji. Having learned the native art of mardani khela from a young age, Shivaji was a master swordsman and proficient in the use of various weapons. He took advantage of his people's expertise in guerilla tactics (Shiva sutra) to re-establish Hindavi Svarajya (native [Hindu being a term traditionally applied to the native inhabitants of India throughout antiquity] self-rule) at a time of Muslim supremacy and increasing intolerance. Utilizing speed, focused surprise attacks (typically at night and in rocky terrain), and the geography of Maharashtra, Karnataka, & South India; the Maratha rulers were successfully able to defend their territory from the more numerous and heavily armed Mughals. The still-existing Maratha Light Infantry is one of the "oldest and most renowned" regiments of the Indian Army, tracing its origins to 1768.

=== Modern period (1857—present) ===
Indian martial arts underwent a period of decline after the full establishment of British colonial rule in the 19th century. More European modes of organizing kings, armies and governmental institutions, and the increasing use of firearms, gradually eroded the need for traditional combat training associated with caste-specific duties. The British colonial government banned kalaripayattu in 1804 in response to a series of revolts. Silambam was also banned and became more common in the Malay Peninsula than its native Tamil Nadu. Nevertheless, traditional fighting systems persisted, sometimes even under the patronage of enthusiastic British spectators who tended to remark on the violence of native boxing and the acrobatic movements characteristic of Indian fighting styles.

The British took advantage of communities with a heavily militaristic culture, characterising them as "martial races" and employing them in the armed forces. Sikhs – already known among Indians for their martial practices – were particularly valued by the colonists as soldiers and guards, and were posted throughout not only India but Southeast Asia and other parts of the British Empire. Members of the army were allowed to box as a way of settling disputes, provided that they were still able to carry out their duties as soldiers after a match. The particular form of boxing used by the Punjabi soldiers was loh-musti, as the kara worn by Sikhs could be wielded like brass knuckles.

The resurgence of public interest in kalaripayattu began in the 1920s in Tellicherry as part of a wave of rediscovery of the traditional arts throughout south India which characterised the growing reaction against British colonial rule. During the following three decades, other regional styles were subsequently revived such as silambam in Tamil Nadu, thang-ta in Manipur and paika akhada in Orissa.

== Texts ==
=== Agni Purana ===
One of the earliest extant manual of Indian martial arts is in the Agni Purana (dated to between the 8th and the 11th century). The dhanurveda section in the Agni Purana spans chapters 248–251, categorizing weapons into thrown and unthrown classes and further divided into several sub-classes. It catalogs training into five major divisions for different types of warriors, namely charioteers, elephant-riders, horsemen, infantry, and wrestlers.

The nine asanas (stances) in the fight are listed below:

1. samapada ("holding the feet even"): standing in closed ranks with the feet put together (248.9)
2. vaiśākha: standing erect with the feet apart (248.10)
3. maṇḍala ("disk"): standing with the knees apart, arranged in the shape of a flock of geese (248.11)
4. ālīḍha ("licked, polished"): bending the right knee with the left foot pulled back (248.12)
5. pratyālīḍha: bending the left knee with the right foot pulled back (248.13)
6. jāta ("origin"): placing the right foot straight with the left foot perpendicular, the ankles being five fingers apart (248.14)
7. daṇḍāyata ("extended staff"): keeping the right knee bent with the left leg straight, or vice versa; called vikaṭa ("dreadful") if the two legs are two palm-lengths apart (248.16)
8. sampuṭa ("hemisphere") (248.17)
9. swastika ("well-being"): keeping the feet 16 fingers apart and lifting the feet a little (248.19)

Then there follows a more detailed discussion of archery technique.

The section concludes with listing the names of actions or "deeds" possible with a number of weapons, including 32 positions to be taken with sword and shield (khaḍgacarmavidhau), 11 names of techniques of using a rope in fighting, along with 5 names of "acts in the rope operation" along with lists of "deeds" pertaining to the chakram (war-quoit), the spear, the tomara (iron club), the gada (mace), the axe, the hammer, the bhindipāla or laguda, the vajra, the dagger, the slingshot, and finally deeds with a bludgeon or cudgel. A short passage near the end of the text returns to the larger concerns of warfare and explains the various uses of war elephants and men. The text concludes with a description of how to appropriately send the well-trained fighter off to war.

=== Arthashastra ===
The Arthashastra, c. 4th century BCE, typically attributed to Chanakya chief advisor of Chandragupta Maurya is one of the earliest treatises on statecraft, including diverse topics such as economics, politics, diplomacy and military strategy.

=== Others ===
There is an extant Dhanurveda-Samhita dating to the mid-14th century, by Brhat Sarngadhara Paddhati (ed. 1888).
Other scattered references to fighting arts in medieval texts include the:
Kamandakiya Nitisara (c. 8th century ed. Manmatha Nath Dutt, 1896),
The Nitivakyamrta by Somadeva Suri (10th century),
The Yuktikalpataru of Bhoja (11th century) and
The Manasollasa of Somesvara III (12th century)

== Weapons and arts ==
A wide array of weapons are used in the Indian subcontinent, some of which are not found anywhere else. According to P.C. Chakravati in The Art of War in Ancient India, armies used standard weapons such as wooden or metal-tipped spears, swords, thatched bamboo, wooden or metal shields, axes, short and longbows in warfare as early as the 4th century BC. Military accounts of the Gupta Empire (c. 240–480) and the later Agni Purana identify over 130 different weapons.

The Agni Purana divides weapons into thrown and unthrown classes. The thrown (mukta) class includes twelve weapons altogether which come under four categories, viz.

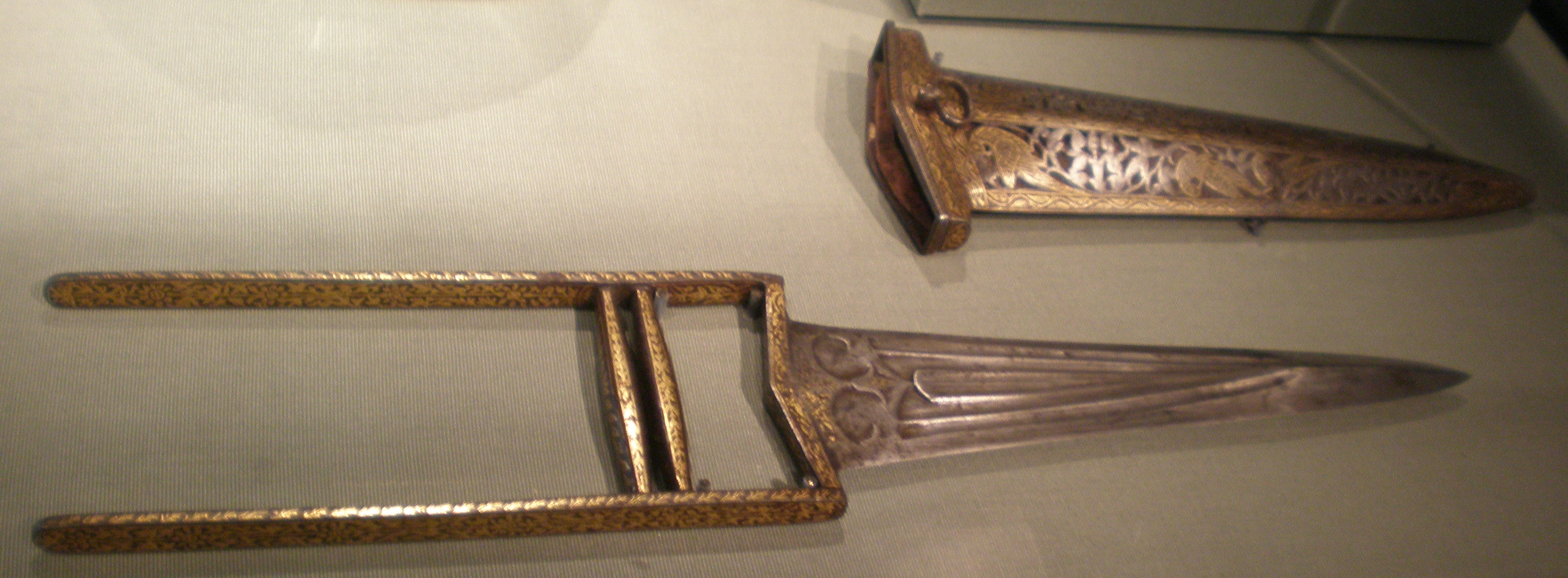
The katara, the most characteristic of daggers in the Indian subcontinent.

- yantra-mukta: projectile weapons such as the sling or the bow
- pāṇi-mukta: weapons thrown by hand such as the javelin
- mukta-sandarita: weapons that are thrown and drawn back, such as the rope-spear
- mantra-mukta: mythical weapons that are thrown by magic incantations (mantra), numbering 6 types

These were opposed to the much larger unthrown class of three categories.

- hasta-śastra or amukta: melee weapons that do not leave the hand, numbering twenty types
- muktāmukta: weapons that can be thrown or used in-close, numbering 98 varieties
- bāhu-yuddha or bhuja-yuddha: weapons of the body, i.e. unarmed fighting

The duel with bow and arrows is considered the noblest, fighting with the spear ranks next, while fighting with the sword is considered unrefined, and wrestling is classed as the meanest or worst form of fighting. Only a Brahmin could be an acharya (teacher) of sastravidya, Kshatriya and vaishya should learn from the Acharya, while a shudra could not take a teacher, left to "fight of his own in danger".

Over time, weaponry evolved and India became famous for its flexible wootz steel. The most commonly taught weapons in the Indian martial arts today are types of swords, daggers, spears, staves, cudgels, and maces.

Weapons are linked to several superstitions and cultural beliefs in the Indian subcontinent. Drawing a weapon without reason is forbidden and considered by Hindus to be disrespectful to the goddess Chandika. Thus the saying that a sword cannot be sheathed until it has drawn blood. It was a mother's duty to tie a warrior's sword around his waist before war or a duel. In addition, she would cut her finger with the sword and make a tilak on his head from a drop of her blood. Weapons themselves were also anointed with tilak, most often from the blood of a freshly-decapitated goat (chatanga). Other taboos include looking at one's reflection in the blade, telling the price or source of acquisition, throwing it on the ground or using it for domestic purposes.

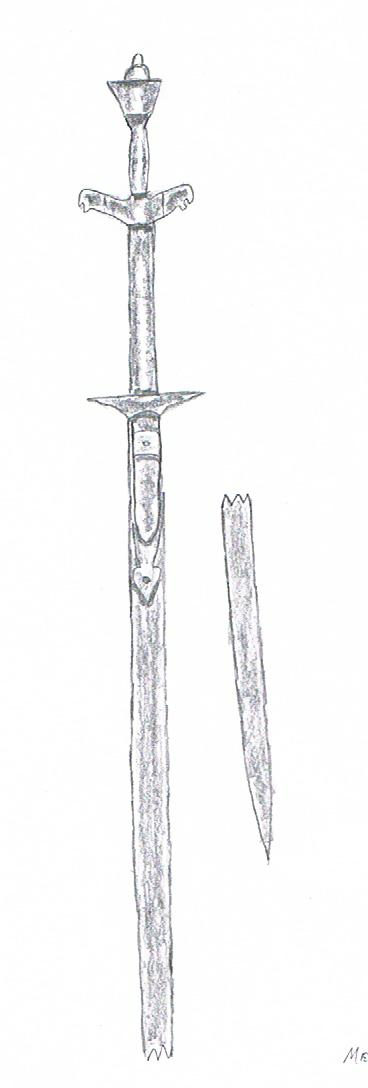
A southern two-handed sword

=== Swordsmanship (Khadgavidya) ===
Nakula and Sahadeva are said to be skilled swordsmen in the Mahabharata. Sword-fighting is one of the common Indian fighting arts. Varieties include the curved single-edge sword, the straight double-edge sword, the two-handed longsword, the gauntlet-sword, and the urumi or flexible sword. Techniques differ from one state to another but all make extensive use of circular movements, often circling the weapon around the user's head. The flexible nature and lightweight of Indian swords allows for speed but provides little defensive ability, so that the swordsman must instead rely on body maneuvers to dodge attacks. Entire systems exist focusing on drawing the sword out of the opponent's body. Stances and forms traditionally made up the early training before students progress to free sparring with sticks to simulate swords in an exercise called gatka, although this term is more often used in English when referring to the Panjabi-Sikh fighting style. A common way to practice precision-cutting is to slice cloves or lemons, eventually doing so while blindfolded. Pairing two swords of equal length, though considered impractical in some parts of the world, is common and was considered highly advantageous in the Indian subcontinent.

=== Staffplay (Lathi khela) ===
Stick-fighting (lathi khela) may be taught as part of a wider system like Gatka, silambam or on its own. In the Kama Sutra the sage Vātsyāyana enjoins all women to practice fighting with single-stick, quarterstaff, sword and bow and arrow in addition to the art of love-making. The stick (lathi in Prakrit) is typically made of bamboo with steel caps at the ends to prevent it from splintering. Wooden sticks made from Indian ebony may also be used. It ranges from the length of a cudgel to a staff equal to the wielder's height. The stick used during matches is covered in leather to cushion the impact. Points are awarded based on which part of the body is hit. Techniques differ from system to system, but northern styles tend to primarily use only one end of the staff for attacking while the other end is held with both hands.

Southern styles like also make use of this technique but will more often use both ends of the staff to strike. The latter is the more common method of attacking in the eastern states and Bangladesh, combined with squatting and frequent changes in height.

=== Spearplay ===
Yudhishthira is said to be a master in spearplay warfare in Mahabharata, while Shalya was also noted to be an excellent warrior in the field of spearplay. According to Hindu mythology, Murugan, the son of Shiva, is said to be skilled in spear-fighting, by holding his divine spear called vel. The Indian spear is typically made of bamboo with a steel blade. It can be used in hand-to-hand combat or thrown when the fighters are farther apart. Despite primarily being a thrusting weapon, the wide spearhead also allows for many slashing techniques. By the 17th century, Rajput mercenaries in the Mughal army were using a type of spear which integrated a pointed spear butt and a club near the head, making it similar to a mace. On the other hand, the longer cavalry spear was made of wood, with red cloth attached near the blade to prevent the opponent's blood from dripping to the shaft. The Marathas were revered for their skill of wielding a ten-foot spear called bothati from horseback. Bothati fighting is practiced with a ball-tipped lance, the end of which is covered in dye so that hits may easily be confirmed. In solo training, the spear is aimed at a pile of stones. From this was eventually developed the uniquely Indian vita which has a 5 feet (1.5 m) length of cord attached to the butt end of the weapon and tied around the spearman's wrist. Using this cord the spear can be pulled back after it has been thrown.

=== Archery (Dhanurvidya) ===
Archery is noted to be one of the noblest form of defense within Indian cultural heritage. As mentioned in Vedic literature, the bow and arrow is the most applauded weapon among Kshatriyas. Siddhartha Gautama, Rama, Arjuna, Karna, Bhishma, Drona and Ekalavya were all said to be great archers.

Dhanurveda is an ancient treatise on the science of archery. It describes the practices and uses of archery, the craft of bow and arrow making, training of the army, and enumerates the rules of engagement. The treatise also discusses martial arts in relation to the training of warriors, charioteers, cavalry, elephant warriors, infantry etc. It was considered as a sin to shoot a warrior from the back and fight more than one warrior at a time. The bow used in the Vedic period were called dhanush, and were described in detail in the Vedas. The curved shape of the bow is called vakra in the Artha Veda. The bowstring was called jya, and was strung only when needed. An arrow was called an iṣu, and a quiver was called an iṣudhi which was slung on the back. Archers wore a hastaghna, which was an arm guard or shield usually worn on the left forearm and was used to protect the wearer from friction caused by the bowstring.

A dhanushkara was a bowyer, or the profession of bow crafting and arrow making, and it had become a regular profession by the early Vedic period. Others called jyakara specialized in making bowstrings.

Composite bows made of horn, sinew, and wood were invented in the Asian Steppes and would have been an integral part of the armory of the Aryan people. As in other civilizations such as the Hittites and Persians, the use of composite bows coincides with chariot warfare. Additionally the smaller size was of the compound bow would have made it preferable on mounted warfare.

A type of Indian longbow was five to six feet long and fired a long cane arrow with metal or bone arrow heads. The Cretan chronicler Nearchus who accompanied Alexander the Great into India, had noted that the warriors would use a bamboo bow, which had to rest on the ground and steady with the feet to draw to its full length. The arrow fired from this bamboo bow could penetrate any armor used in antiquity. The Indian long bows were described as the height of their users by Arrian, and Deccan bows in 1518 as "long like those of England".

Traditional archery is today practiced mainly in the far northern states of Ladakh and Arunachal. One sport which has persisted into the present day is thoda from Himachal Pradesh, in which a team of archers attempt to shoot blunt arrows at the legs of the opposing team.

=== Mace-fighting (Gadayuddha) ===
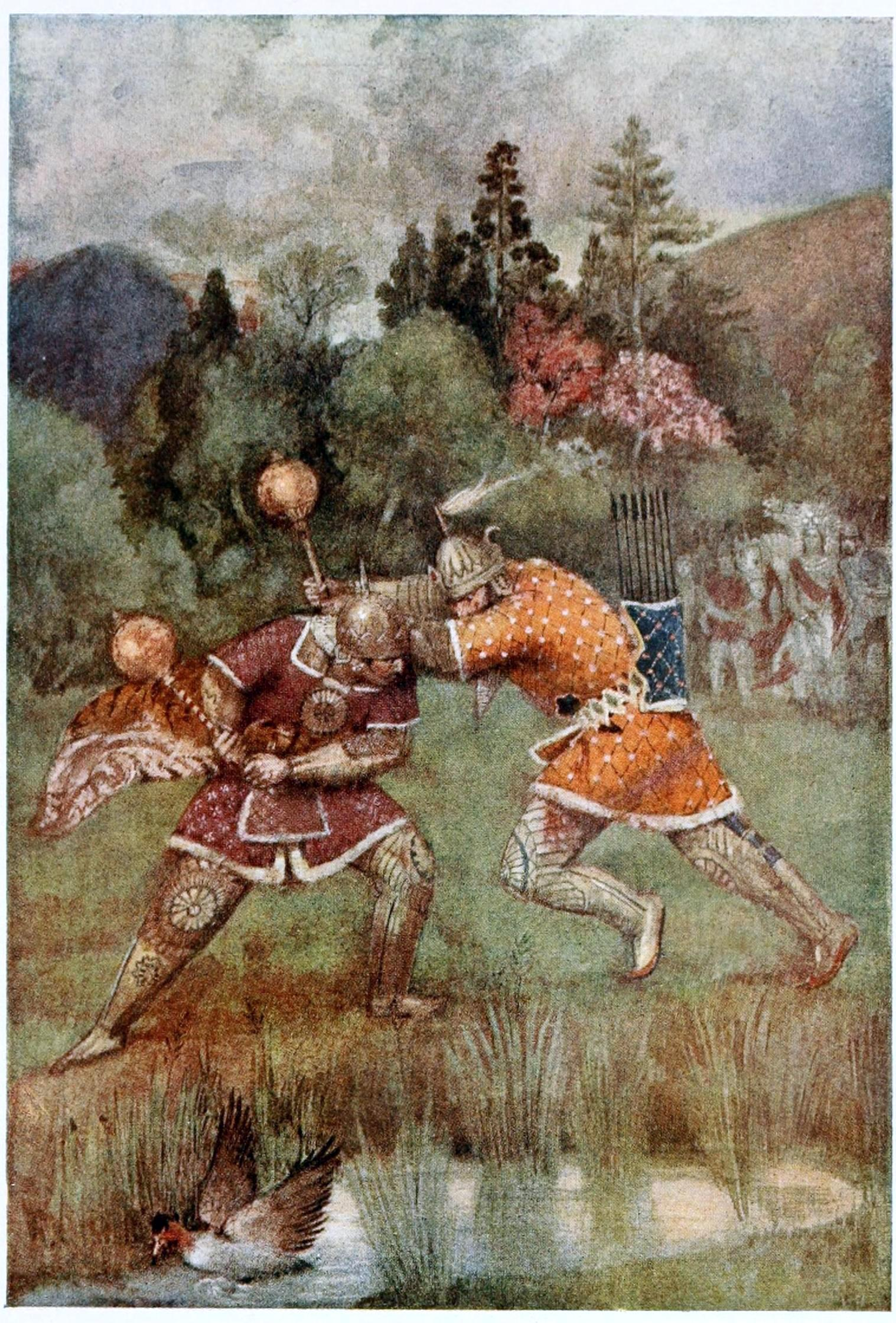
Bhima dueling Duryodhana

Gada (mace) is the weapon of Hanuman in the Ramayana. Vishnu also carries a gada named Kaumodaki in one of his four hands. In the Mahabharata epic, the fighters Bhima, Duryodhana, Jarasandha and Balarama were said to be masters of the gada. In the mace combat, Bhima wins the final battle against Duryodhana by hitting his inner thigh. Such an attack below the waist was said to be against the etiquette of mace duels, implying a degree of commonality to this type of fighting. It was and still is used as training equipment by wrestlers. The traditional gada (mace) was essentially a wooden or steel sphere mounted on a handle and with a single spike at the top. An alternative mace-head was the lotus-shaped padam. According to the Agni Purana, the gada can be handled in twenty different ways. Due to its weight, the gada is said to be best suited to fighters with a large build or great strength. The Mughal club or mace, known as a gurj or gargaj, had a head consisting of 8–10 petal-shaped blades. Fitted with basket-hilt, a spherical pommel, and a spiked top, this type of club was designed for beating down armour-clad opponents. Alternatively, some gurj had a spiked top and a hand-guard.

=== Wrestling (Mallayuddha) ===
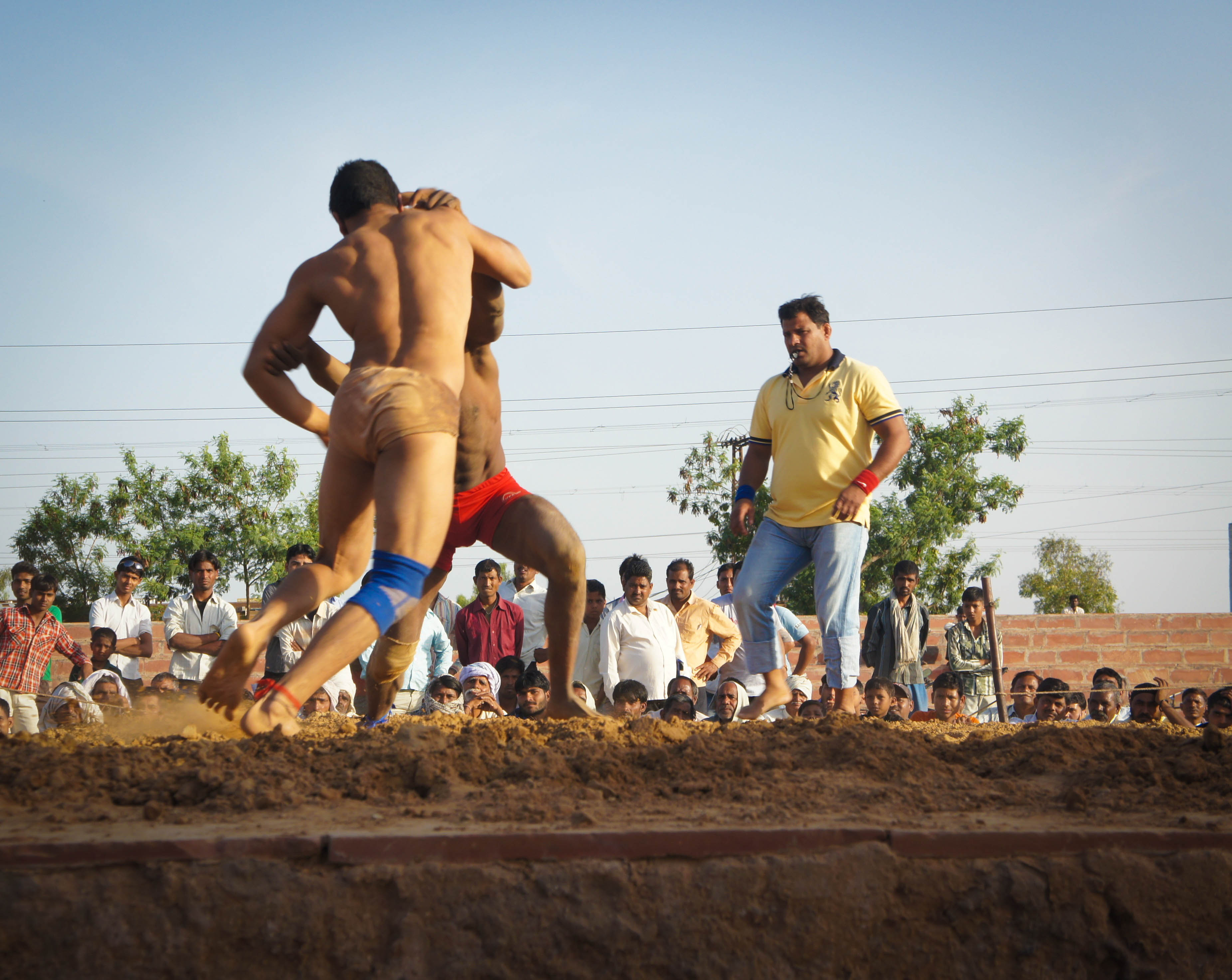
Wrestling match in Bharatpur, 2013.

Grappling arts (malla-vidya), practiced either as sport or fighting style, are found throughout the Indian subcontinent. True combat-wrestling is called malla-yuddha, while the term malakhra refers to wrestling for sport. Malla-yuddha was codified into four forms which progressed from purely sportive contests of strength to actual full-contact fights known as yuddha. Due to the extreme violence, this final form is generally no longer practised. The second form, wherein the wrestlers attempt to lift each other off the ground for three seconds, persists in Karnataka. Traditional malla-yuddha is virtually extinct in the north where it has been supplanted by kusti, but another form called malakhra still exists in parts of India and Sindh, Pakistan. Vajra-musti was another old grappling art in which the competitors wrestled while wearing a horned knuckleduster. In a later style called naki ka kusti (claw wrestling), the duellists fought with bagh nakha. Numerous styles of folk wrestling are also found in India's countryside, such as mukna from Manipur, Inbuan wrestling from Mizoram and Khomlainai among the Bodos.

=== Wrestling (Pehlwani) ===
Pehlwani is a form of wrestling from the Indian subcontinent. It was developed in the Mughal Empire by combining native malla-yuddha with influences from Persian varzesh-e bastani. One of the most famous practitioners of pehlwani was The Great Gama (Ghulam Mohammad Baksh Butt), who is considered one of the greatest wrestlers of all time.

=== Boxing (Mushtiyuddha) ===
Boxing (musti-yuddha) is traditionally considered the roughest form of Indian unarmed combat. In ancient times it was popular throughout northern Indian subcontinent, but is rarely practiced today. Boxers harden their fists by striking stones and other hard objects. Matches may be either one-on-one or group fights. All kinds of strikes and grabs are allowed, and any part of the body may be targeted except the groin. Another form of boxing was loh-musti (meaning "iron fist"), said to have been practiced by the deity Krishna. In this variation, boxers fought while wielding a kara or steel bracelet like a knuckleduster. Grabs, kicks, biting and attacks to the groin were all legal, the only prohibition being spitting on the opponent which was considered crude and dishonourable. The kara used for regular matches was unadorned, but the form employed during war had one or more spikes around its edge. The kara may be paired with one on each hand, but it was generally only worn on one hand so the other hand could be left free. In some cases the free hand could be paired with another weapon, most commonly the bagh nakha.

=== Kicking ===
Kick-fighting (aki kiti) is the preserve of tribes from Nagaland. While the entire Naga population of northeast India and northwest Myanmar was traditionally known for their skill with broadswords (dao) and other weapons, disputes among tribesmen and between tribes were settled with a solely kick-based form of unarmed fighting. The goal is to either drive the opponent to their knees or outside of the ring. Only the feet are used to strike, and even blocking must be done with the legs.

=== Pugilism ===
Many forms of unarmed combat (bāhu-yuddha or bhuja-yuddha) incorporate too wide an array of techniques to be accurately categorized. In modern times when the carrying of weapons is no longer legal, teachers of the martial arts often emphasise the unarmed techniques as these are seen to be more practical for self-defense purposes. A warrior who fights unarmed is referred to as a bhajanh, literally meaning someone who fights with their arms. The bare-handed components of Indian fighting arts are typically based on the movements of animals, Hindu deities. Binot, a Central Indian art which focuses on defending against both armed and unarmed opponents, may be the earliest system of its kind. In the Mughal era, such fighters were known as ek-hath (lit. "one-hand"), so named because they would demonstrate their art using only one arm.

=== Balavidya ===
64 different types of skills and arts existed in ancient India which led to well-developed individuals, boosting their mind, body, and intellect, making them capable of performing their responsibilities efficiently and effectively on personal, social, and national levels. These included art forms like muḍgala-vidyā, vajramuṣṭi, sūryabhedana, aśva, and various types of yaśvantī malla-vidyā, using weapons like lāṭhī (iron-bound bamboo stick), kāṭhī (pole), pharī-gaḍga, ḍorakhaṇḍa (rope), and daṇḍapaṭṭa (gauntlet-sword).

== Systems ==
As in other respects of Indian culture, Indian martial arts can be roughly divided into northern and southern styles. The northern systems (including Pakistan and Bangladesh) may generically be referred to as shastra-vidiya, although this term is often used synonymously with gatka. The main difference is that the north was more exposed to Persianate influence during the Mughal period, while the south is more conservative in preserving ancient and medieval traditions. The exception to this rule are the northeastern states which, due to their geographic location, were closed off from most pre-European foreign invaders. As a result, northeast Indian culture and fighting methods are also closely related to that of Southeast Asia and Oceania. In addition to the major division between north and south, martial systems in the Indian subcontinent tend to be associated with certain states, cities, villages or ethnic groups.

=== Regional styles ===
Andhra Pradesh

Masters in Andhra Pradesh trace their lineage to the Vijayanagara empire, popular in Konaseema region. The native system of Chedi Talimkhana or yudhkaushalya che talim is often abbreviated to Talimkhana or simply Talim. The art makes use of several weapons which are used in preset forms. These include knife fighting (baku samu), sword fighting (Katti samu), and staff fighting (Karra samu) in addition to other weapons such as the gada (mace) and pata (guantlet sword).

Bengal and Northeast India

Bengali war-dances bear testament to the weapons once used in the Bengal region. Today most of these weapons are used only in choreographed fights, including dao khela (knife fighting) and fala khela (sword fighting). Traditional stick-fighting (lathi khela) is still used in free sparring today. The sticks may be short like a cudgel or a long staff. The former are sometimes paired with a shield.

Lathi khela is a traditional Bengali martial art – a kind of stick fighting practised mainly in Bengal and Northeast India. Stick fighting has an ancient history in the Indian subcontinent. Rich farmers and other eminent people hired lathial for security and as a symbol of their power. Duels were used as a way to protect or take land and other possessions. A proverb in some South Asian languages is "whoever wields the lathi keeps the cow". Zamindars (feudal lords) sent groups of lathial to forcefully collect taxes from villagers. Lathi training was at one time included in the Bratachari system of education.

Bihar

"Pari-khanda" is a fighting form created by Rajputs and is still practised in many parts of Bihar. "Pari" means shield and "khanda" means sword according "Chhau" region, therefore this art uses sword and shield for fighting. This fighting form has given birth to a local dance form named "Chhau" dance and its martial elements have been fully absorbed by this dance. It is even practised in some parts of Jharkhand and Odisha. Chhau is the name of the traditional dance- drama of the eastern regions of India and is of three types. The three forms of "Chhau" are named after the district or village where they are performed, i.e. the Purulia Chau of Bengal, the Seraikella Chau of Bihar and the Mayurbhanj Chau of Orissa.

Karnataka

The Kannada fighting arts are taught exclusively at traditional training halls or garadi mane. Disciplines include unarmed combat (kai varase), staff-fighting (kolu varase) and sword-fighting (katti varase) among various other weapons. These are most often seen today only during choreographed demonstrations at festivals.

Kashmir

Kashmiri swordsmanship is said to have an ancient history, but it was only much later that it acquired its modern name of sqay. Sqay survived a decline following the partition of India by adopting competitive methodologies of karate and taekwondo. Types of competition include sparring, breaking, and forms or khawankay. Practitioners spar using fake swords called tora which are paired with a shield. Sparring is point-based, the points being awarded for successful hits with the tora or with the foot.

Kerala

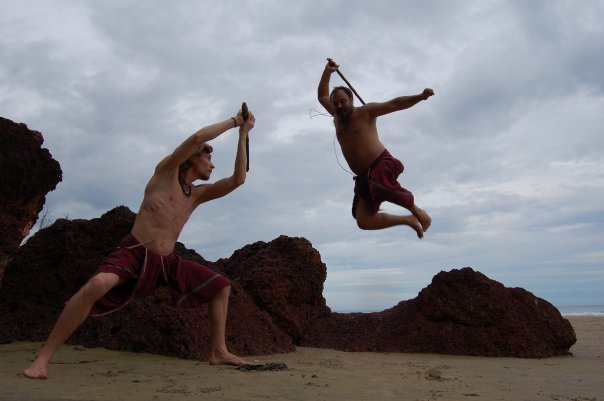
Kalaripayat stick-fighting

The Keralite martial of Kalaripayattu, came into its present form through the kalari, the local variation of the gurukula educational institution in Kerala. The most common weapons today are the staff, stick, sword, shield, spear, dagger and flexible sword, locally known as Urumi. Kerala is also home to a native form of submission wrestling called Gatta gusthi.

Maharashtra

The Marathas developed their fighting style based on the state's hilly geography. Mardani khel today teaches armed techniques for use in single combat as well as defense against several opponents. Other weapons include the sword, shield, spear, dagger, kukri, double deer horns, and bow and arrow.

Manipur

The Manipuri art of Huyen langlon was once practiced by the state's indigenous hill tribes who would engage in duels governed by strict rules of conduct. The armed component called thang-ta is named after the system's main weapons, the thang (sword) and ta (spear). Practitioners spar through cheibi gatka in which a foam sword is used together with a shield. Unarmed huyen lalong is called sarit-sarak and is used in conjunction with thang-ta when the fighter loses their weapon.

Nagaland

Aki Kiti is a semi-contact combat sport characterized by kicking and blocking solely using the soles of the feet. The word Aki Kiti means "kick fighting".

Odisha

The Odishan martial art traces back to the paika class of warriors who were particularly known for their use of the khanda or double-edge straight sword. During times of peace, the paika would hone their skills through martial dances, forms-training and various acrobatics. Their descendants have preserved these exercises in training halls called paika akhada, and demonstrate them mainly through street performances. Their method of sword training called phari-khanda is still used as the first part of the chhau dance. Other weapons include the staff and guantlet-sword.

North West India

Martial arts in northwest India and adjacent Pakistan were traditionally referred to by several terms but the most common today is shastar vidya or "science of edged weapons". Swordsmen practiced their techniques either in routines using real swords, or freestyle sparring with wooden sticks called gatka, a form of stick-fighting. Gatka is associated with the Sikh history and an integral part of an array of Rajput Shastar Vidya. During the colonial period, the term gatka was extended to mean northwestern martial arts in general. Some aspects of the art, such as the unarmed techniques or fighting in armour, are today practiced almost exclusively by the Nihang order of Sikhs. Gatka incorporates several forms, each with their own set of weapons, strategies and footwork. In the late 18th century, this martial art further developed as a recreational game and University Lahore codified its rules for playing it as a game.

Tamil Nadu

சிலம்பம்
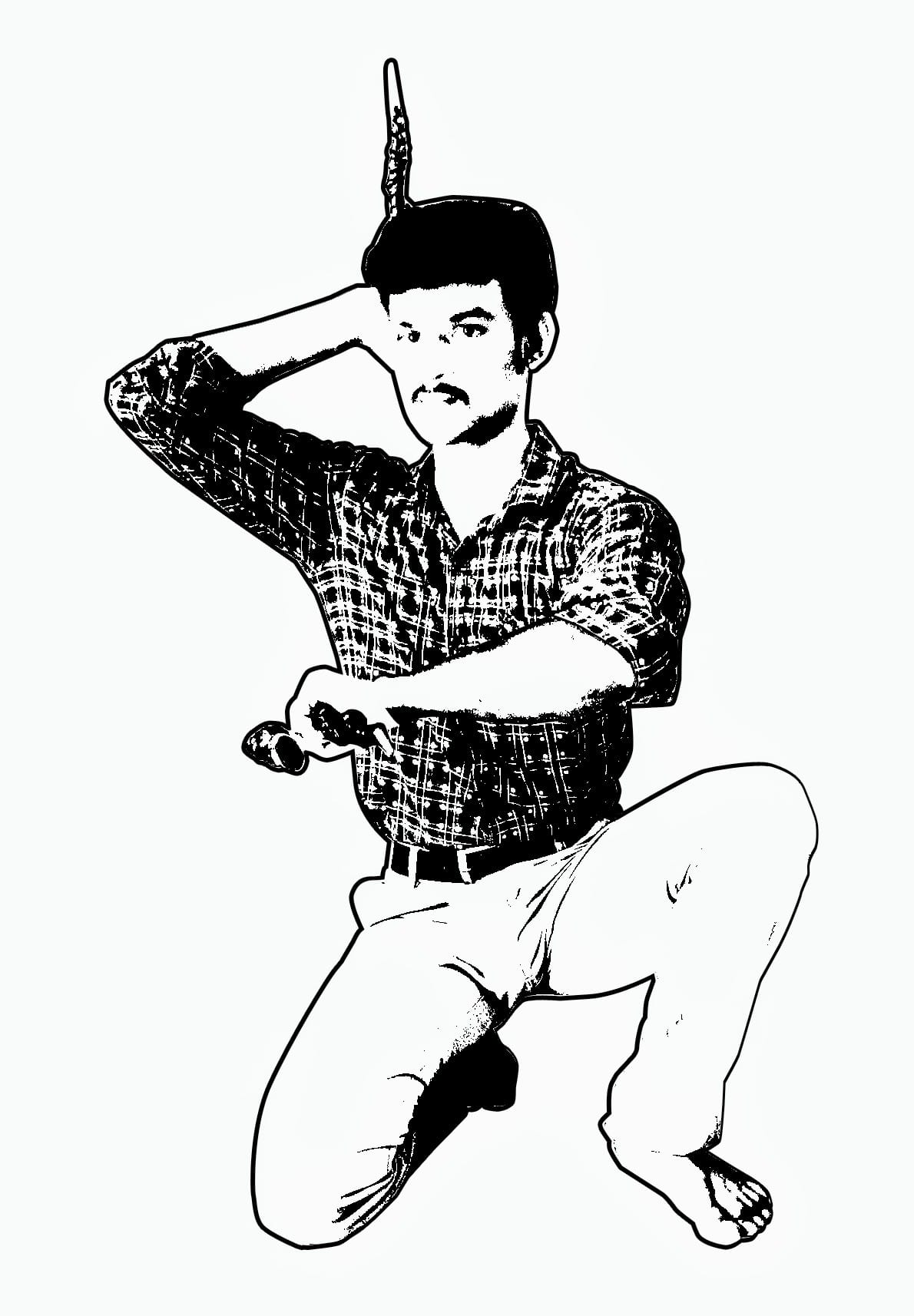
- Also known as: Silambattam
- Focus: Traditional Weapons
- Country of origin: பாரத(தமிழ் நாடு)
- Olympic sport: No
- Martial art: Silambam

The native Tamil martial art has come to be referred to as silambam after its main weapon, the bamboo staff. Training begins with footwork patterns before progressing to stances and subsequently fighting techniques. Aside from its namesake, silambam includes a variety of weapons such as the sword, twin sticks, double deer horns, whip, sword, shield and sword, dagger, flexible sword and sickle. Unarmed silambam (kai silambam) is based on animal movements such as the snake, eagle, tiger and elephant. Other Martial Arts of Tamil Nadu are Varma Kalai, Adi Thadi, Malyutham, Valariveechu, Vaalveechu, Gusthi (Boxing form of Tamil Nadu, not to be confused with North Indian Kushti which is a Wrestling art). There are 64 various kind of arts mentioned in Tamil sangam literature and they are normally called as aayakalaigal 64 but most of them are now extinct and not in use nowadays.

== Influence ==
Historic Indosphere cultural influence zone of Greater India for transmission of elements of Indian culture including martial arts.

With expansion of Indosphere cultural influence of Greater India, through transmission of Hinduism in Southeast Asia and the Silk Road transmission of Buddhism leading to Indianization of Southeast Asia through formation of non-Indian southeast Asian native Indianized kingdoms which adopted Sanskritised language and other Indian elements such as the honorific titles, Sanskritised naming of people, Sanskritised naming of places, Sankritised institutional mottos, Sanskritised educational institute names, as well as adoption of Indian martial arts, Indian architecture, Indian music and dance, traditional Indian clothing, and Indian cuisine, a process which has also been aided by the ongoing historic expansion of Indian diaspora. The martial arts influenced by the Indian martial arts include Angampora, Ankam, Bokator, Eskrima, Krabi krabong, Kbachkun Dambong-Veng, Khmer traditional wrestling, Muay Boran, Muay Thai, Panatukan, Pencak Silat, Silat Melayu, Thaing (Burmese), Vovinam etc.

== See also ==
=== South Asian ===
- Angampora
- Gatka
- Kalaripayattu
- Kuttu Varisai
- Mardani khel
- Shastar Vidya
- Silambam
- Sqay
- Varma kalai
- Thang-ta

=== Non-South Asian ===
- Banshay
- Bataireacht
- Bōjutsu
- Jūkendō
- Kendo
- Kenjutsu
- Krabi–krabong
- Tahtib

=== Related topics ===
- Indian physical culture
- Traditional games of South Asia
