= Silambam =

Indian martial art

- Also known as: Silambattam, Chilambam, Chilambattam
- Focus: Weapons
- Hardness: Semi-contact
- Country of origin: India
- Olympic sport: No

Silambam is an old Indian martial art originating in the southern Indian state of Tamil Nadu. This style is mentioned in Tamil Sangam literature. The World Silambam Association is the official international body of Silambam.

== Origin ==
References in the Silappadikaram and other works of the Sangam literature show that Silambam has been practiced since at least the 4th century BC. It derives from the Tamil word silam, meaning hill. The term silambambu referred to a particular type of bamboo from the Kurinjimala (kurinji hills) in present-day Kerala. Thus silambam was named after its primary weapon, the bamboo staff. It may have earlier used for self-defense and to ward off animals in the Kurinji hills and later evolved into the present-day martial art. Bamboo staffs – as well as swords, pearls and armor – were in great demand from foreign traders.

The ancient city of Madurai formed as the point of focus of Silambam spreading. The Silambam staff was acquired by the Egyptians, Greeks and Romans and was spread back to the Middle East, Europe and North Africa. The Tamil Kingdom which encompassed Southern India and Sri Lanka spread it throughout the Southeast Asia.

The Kings Puli Thevar and Dheeran Chinnamalai had armies of Silambam soldiers named "Thadii Pattalam." Veerapandiya Kattabomman, Chinna Maruthu and Periya Maruthu (1760–1799) relied mainly on their Silambam prowess in warfare against the British East India Company. Indian martial arts and other related martial arts practices suffered a decline after the British banned Silambam and promoted modern military training, which favored firearms over traditional weaponry.

== Training ==
The first stages of Silambam practice are meant to provide a foundation for fighting, and also preparatory body conditioning. This includes improving flexibility, agility, and hand-eye coordination, kinesthetic awareness, balance, strength, speed, muscular and cardiovascular stamina.

=== Weapons ===
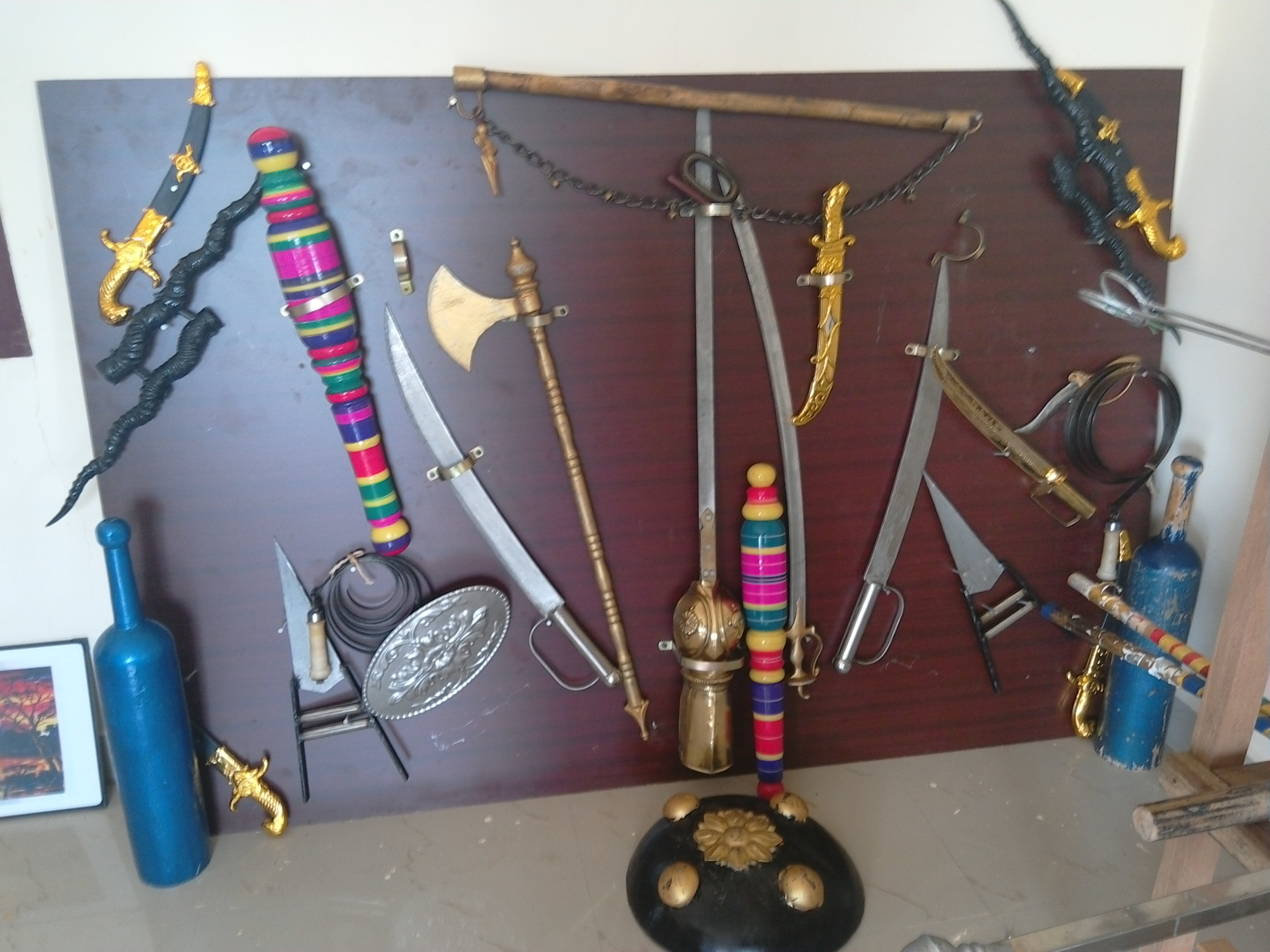
Weapons used in Silambam

Silambam's main focus is on the bamboo staff. The length of the staff depends on the height of the practitioner. Ideally, it should just touch the forehead about three fingers from the head, typically measuring around 1.68 meters (five and a half feet). Different lengths may be used depending on the situation. For instance, the sedikuchi or 3-foot stick can be easily concealed. Separate practice is needed for staffs of different lengths. Silambam encompasses the use of a wide range of traditional weapons, including:

- Silambam staff: preferably made from bamboo, but sometimes also from teak or Indian rose chestnut wood. The staff is immersed in water and strengthened by beating it on the surface of still or running water. It is often tipped with metal rings to prevent the ends from being damaged.
- Maru: a thrusting weapon made from deer (more accurately, Blackbuck) horns.
- Aruval: machete, often paired.
- Panthukol: staff with balls of fire, or weighted chains on each end.
- Savuku: whip.
- Vaal: sword, generally curved.
- Kuttu katai: spiked knuckleduster.
- Katti: knife.
- Kattari: native push-dagger with a H-shaped handle. Some are capable of piercing armor. The blade may be straight or wavy.
- Urumi: flexible sword.
- Sedikuchi: cudgel or short stick, often wielded as a pair.

=== Kuttu Varisai ===
Kuttu Varisai is the unarmed combat component of Silambam and also a stand-alone martial art. It contains animal forms.

== World initiatives ==
Silambam made its first historical appearance in the eyes of the world through the auspices of the committee of the United Nations Assembly, which recommended Silambam Asia for United Nations status. The inauguration was held at the United Nations Headquarters in New York, United States on 21 January 2019. However, the China-Taipei government representatives raised questions concerning border conflicts in ancient records pertaining to Silambam. A request was lodged for the organization of Silambam Asia to resolve with ratification of the raised problems by member states. On 30 January 2019, substantive work was completed and concluded for Silambam Asia with Special Status in the United Nations.

On 29 August 2022, the World Silambam Association was subsequently granted Special Status and functions as an international governing body for Silambam, engaged in development activities aligned with the United Nations Sustainable Development Goals (UN SDGs), notably in the fields of health, arts, sports, education, culture, gender equality, climate action, and partnerships.

== Notable practitioners ==
K. Pajanivel, Silambam exponent from Puducherry honoured with the Padma Shri on 25 May 2026 for his contribution towards preserving and promoting the ancient Tamil martial art.

== In popular culture ==
In many M.G.Ramachandran (MGR) films from the 1950s and 1960s, MGR had incorporated silambam fighting scenes to popularize these ancient martial arts in the 20th century. MGR himself was a practitioner of silambam fighting, learning this martial art from Master Madurai Maadakulam Ravi. Some of these movies include Thaikkupin Tharam, Periya Idathu Penn, Mugaraasi and Thanipiravi.

List of films featuring Silambam
Year	Film	Language(s)	Lead actor(s) / Performer(s)
1956	Thaikkupin Tharam	Tamil	M. G. Ramachandran
1962	Thayai Katha Thanayan	Tamil	M. G. Ramachandran
1963	Periya Idathu Penn	Tamil	M. G. Ramachandran
1964	Padagotti	Tamil	M. G. Ramachandran
1966	Mugaraasi	Tamil	M. G. Ramachandran
1966	Thanipiravi	Tamil	M. G. Ramachandran
1970	Maattukara Velan	Tamil	M. G. Ramachandran
1971	Rickshawkaran	Tamil	M. G. Ramachandran
1976	Uzhaikkum Karangal	Tamil	M. G. Ramachandran
1978	Thai Meethu Sathiyam	Tamil	Rajinikanth
1980	Murattu Kaalai	Tamil	Rajinikanth
1982	Thooral Ninnu Pochchu	Tamil	K. Bhagyaraj
1983	Mundhanai Mudichu	Tamil	K. Bhagyaraj
1989	Karagattakaran	Tamil	Ramarajan
1992	Thevar Magan	Tamil	Kamal Haasan
1994	Periya Marudhu	Tamil	Vijayakanth
1995	Villadhi Villain	Tamil	Sathyaraj
1996	Amman Kovil Vaasalile	Tamil	Ramarajan
2008	Silambattam	Tamil	Silambarasan
2010	Vamsam	Tamil	Kishore
2011	7 Aum Arivu	Tamil	Suriya
2015	Baahubali: The Beginning	Telugu	Prabhas
2018	Seemaraja	Tamil	Samantha Akkineni
2022	Ponniyin Selvan: I	Tamil	Karthi

== See also ==
- Adimurai
- Angampora
- Banshay
- Bataireacht
- Bōjutsu
- Gatka
- Jūkendō
- Kalaripayattu
- Kbachkun boraan
- Kendo
- Kenjutsu
- Krabi–krabong
- Kuttu Varisai
- Mardani khel
- Silambam Asia
- Silat
  - Pencak Silat
  - Silat Melayu
- Tahtib
- Thang-ta
- Varma kalai
- World Silambam Association
