= Varma kalai =

Indian study of vulnerable anatomy

Varma Kalai (Tamil: வர்மக்கலை, varmakalai), also known as Marma Vidhya ( Sanskrit: marma-vidya/marmam) is an Indian traditional art of pressure points. It combines massage, alternative medicine, traditional yoga and martial arts in which the body's pressure points (varmam) are manipulated to heal or cause harm. The healing application called Vaidhiya Murai is part of Siddha medicine (siddha vaidyam).

Its combat application is known as Adimurai (it includes a component called Varma Adi, meaning "pressure-point striking") can be done either empty-handed or with a blunt weapon such as a stick or staff. Varma Kalai is usually taught in the advanced stage of Adimurai, Kalaripayattu, and Silambam in Kerala and Tamil Nadu; strikes are often targeted at the nerves and soft tissues.

== History ==
Folk traces varma kalai to the god Shiva, who is said to have taught it to his son Murugan. While disguised as an old man, Murugan passed the knowledge of 108 Varmams to his disciple, the sage Agastya, who then recorded it and disseminated the skill among his students. Nadars tribe believes varma kalai was given to them by Agastya . Siddha medicine is also attributed to Agastya. With numerous other scattered references to Varmam in Vedic and epic sources, it is certain that Tamil Nadu's early fighters knew and practiced attacking and defending vital points.

Knowledge of the body's vital points in India included not only humans but also elephants. Known as nila, learning these points on an elephant's body was and remains necessary for mahouts. Prodding particular nila with a stick elicits various responses such as bringing the animal under control or making them kneel. Warriors would learn to attack certain nila on opposing war-elephants during battle, which could either kill or frighten the animals. The national museums of Sri Lanka have documented at least 86 nila and their functions.

== Schools ==
Varma kalai is attributed to several Siddhars, namely Agastya, Bogar, Theriyar, Pulipani and famously Avvaiyar. Out of these, only the Agastya school is commonly practiced in Tamil Nadu and in the neighboring state of Kerala.

== See also ==
- Angampora
- Banshay
- Bataireacht
- Bōjutsu
- Butthan
- Gatka
- Jūkendō
- Kalaripayattu
- Kendo
- Kenjutsu
- Krabi–krabong
- Kuttu Varisai
- Mardani khel
- Siddha medicine
- Silambam
- Silambam Asia
- Tahtib
- Thang-ta
- World Silambam Association
