= Gatka =

Martial art from the Punjab region

- Gatka players in combat mode demonstrating skills of Sikh martial art, 7 March 2015
- Focus: Weaponry
- Country of origin: Punjab region in India and Pakistan
- Olympic sport: No

Gatka (Gurmukhi: ਗੱਤਕਾ. Shahmukhi: گَتّکا; gatkā), also known as Khutka, is a form of martial art associated primarily with the Sikhs of the Punjab. It is a style of stick-fighting, with wooden sticks intended to simulate swords. The Punjabi name, gatka, refers to the wooden stick used and this term might have originated as a diminutive of a Sanskrit word, gada, meaning "mace". It has been revived as a standardised, international sport. There are two forms, traditional and sport. It has also been described as a folk-dance.

The stick used in Gatka is made of wood and is usually 91–107 cm (36–42 in) long, with a thickness of around 12.7 mm (0.50 in). It comes with a fitted leather hilt, 15–18 cm (5.9–7.1 in) and is often decorated with Punjabi-style multi-coloured threads.

The other weapon used in the sport is a shield, natively known as phari. It is round in shape, measuring 23 by 23 centimetres (9.1 in × 9.1 in), and is made of dry leather. It is filled with either cotton or dry grass to protect the hand of player in case of full contact hit by an opponent.

Gatka originated in the Punjab in the 15th century as part of the Shastar Vidya martial art system. There has been a revival during the later 20th century, with an International Gatka Federation was founded in 1982 and formalized in 1987, and gatka is now popular as a sport or sword dance performance art and is often shown during Sikh festivals. The martial-art is known as Gatkabaazi or Gatkebaazi but has become abbreiviated as Gatka. Other spellings include Gadka and Gadā.

== History ==
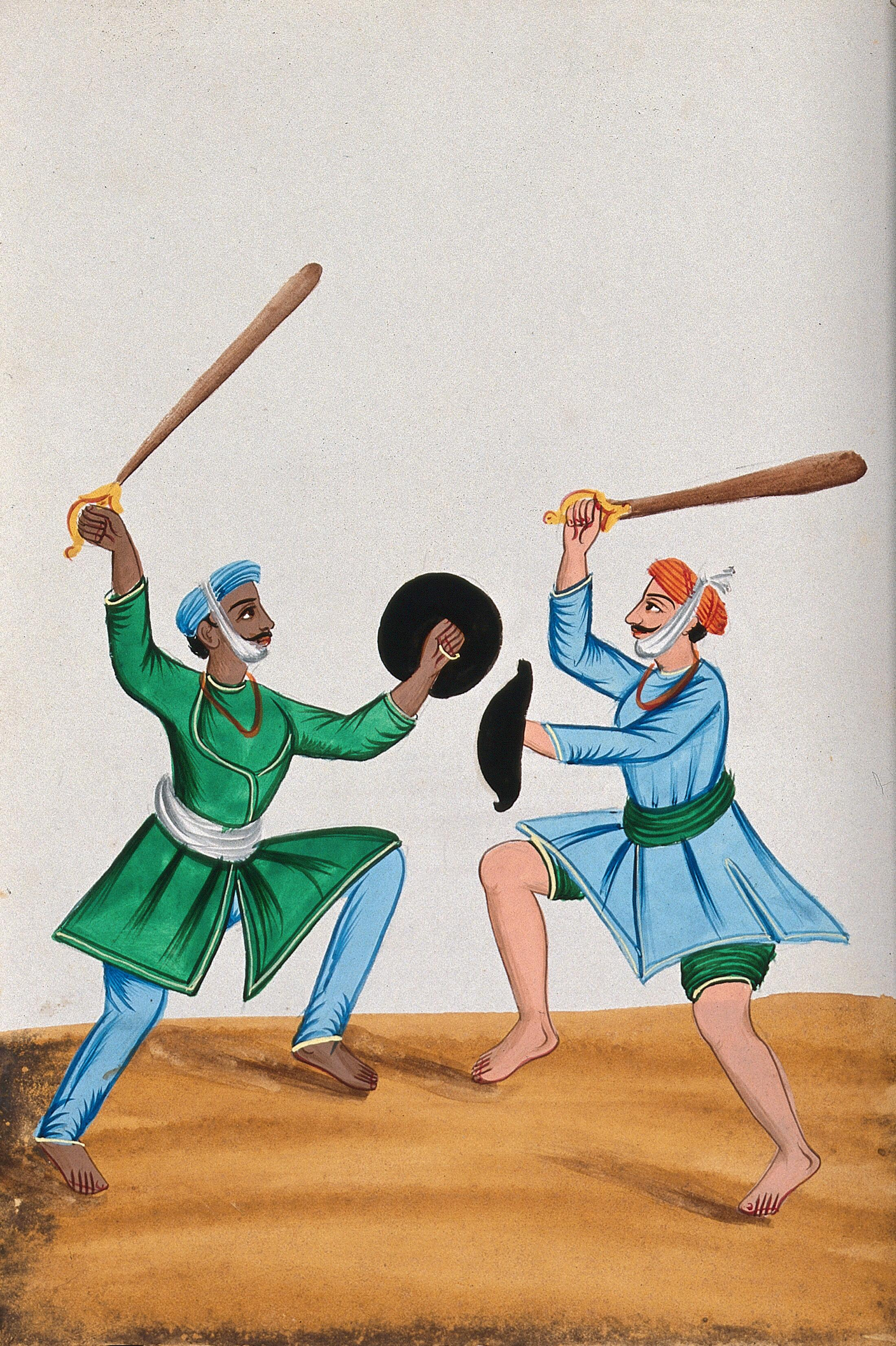
Two Sikh men dueling with wooden swords. 19th century watercolour by an Indian artist.

There are claims of gatka's antecedents as a stick-fighting art, such as it being a surviving form of an ancient Indian martial-art, as showcased during Dussehra processions in relation to the Ramayana. There are a number of akharas where martial-arts were practiced, with it being claimed that gatka originates from Manu. Gatka has been connected to the Sikh martial-art Shastar Vidya, which is chiefly practicised by the Nihangs and associated historically with Guru Hargobind and Guru Gobind Singh. It developed as a style of fighting when outnumbered. Martial-arts has a long association with Sikhism, with Guru Angad believed to have sponsored wrestling and learnt it from Guru Nanak. Guru Ram Das founded the Mal Akhara in Amritsar and awarded a turban-of-victory to Guru Arjan after he won a wrestling match against the wrestler Maskeen. The next guru Guru Hargobind martialized the Sikhs further, such as the adoption of the principle of miri-piri. Originally, Gatka existed as a style under one branch (known as a aṅg) of the wider Shastar Vidya martial art system. Gatka originated as a stick-fighting style known as Gatkabazi under the Gadā yudh (stick/club fighting) branch of Shastar Vidya. Gatka's theory and techniques were taught by the Sikh gurus. It has been handed down in an unbroken lineage of ustāds (masters), and taught in many akharas (arenas) around the world. Gatka was employed in the Sikh wars and has been thoroughly battle-tested. It originates from the need to defend dharam (righteousness), but is also based on the unification of the spirit and body: miri piri). It is, therefore, generally considered to be both a spiritual and physical practice.

German FELDPOST postcard showing Indian Army Sikh, Gurkha and other Prisoners of War presenting a GATKA martial arts display to their colleagues using the lathi (cudgel) at the Crescent Moon POW Camp at Wunsdorf-Zossen, Germany. Circa 1916; World War 1.

After the Second Anglo-Sikh War, the art was banned by the new British administrators of India in the mid-19th century. Specifically, the sword (neja) and the Sikh practice of carrying a sword was outlawed during colonial-rule, thus the sword was replaced with a stick in Sikh martial-arts, thus the practice continued in rural areas and in a confidential manner, such as by the Nihangs. As per Kamalroop Singh Birk: "[gatka] moved away from a killing art to a defense or display art". The new style applied the sword-fighting techniques to the wooden training-stick. It was referred to as gatka, after its primary weapon. Gatka was used mainly by the British Indian Army in the 1860s as practice for hand-to-hand combat. In the 1880s, Sikh soldiers in the British Indian Army utilized sword-fighting for martial practice, being influenced by fencing. In the late 19th century, gatka developed closer to its current state and by 1920 two forms of gatka existed: traditional (rasmi) and sport (khel). In 1930, gatka was described in Kahn Singh Nabha's Mahan Kosh but also the word khutka or kutka is used as a synonym, with the word referring to a leather club. A similar definition is given by Pathak (1946). In 1936, Kartar Singh Akali published a treatise on the martial-art, covering rules and regulations, movements, guides, and methods. Kartar Singh Akali is credited with establishing the base rules. The same year, rules were adopted and Panjab University in Lahore (now in Chandigarh) institutionalised and standardised the rules in the pre-partition period, with the school holding inter-college and inter-varsity gatka tournaments.

Traditionally, gatka was performed during religious processions (such as during Hola Mohalla) and by males only but has since become a competitive sport at both a national and international level, being practised by females as well. Yogi Bhajan believed that gatka was a form of Adi-Shakti Yoga. In the 1980s, another text on gatka by Nanak Dev Singh was published titled Gatka: Book One–Dance of the Sword. International Gatka Federation was founded in 1982. In 1985 onward, the sport witnessed a decline as educational institutions stopped holding competitions. In 2001, Punjabi University, Patiala started holding inter-college gatka competitions again. In 2011 onward, all-India inter-varsity gatka tournaments have begun being held. 11th Indian Gatka Championship was played in 2023. 1st World Gatka Championship was held in 1987 and 1st European Gatka Championship was held in 2005. Today, gatka is practised as a sport throughout India by all communities. It is officially recognised by the Sports Authority of India. Various jatka organisations exist, including the World Gatka Federation, Gatka Federation of India, Punjab Gatka Association, and various gatka akharas. Special sport uniforms have also been devised for players and referees. The Gatka Federations holds two types of gatka competitions, Virsa Sambhal (where traditional bana clothing is worn) events and sports tournaments. Punjabi University, Patiala offers a one-year diploma course in gatka. In North America, tournaments are held under the Yudh Gatka Tournament.

The Ministry of Sports and Youth Affairs of the Government of India has included Gatka, with three other indigenous games, namely Kalaripayattu, Thang-Ta and Mallakhamba, as part of the planned Khelo India Youth Games 2021, expected to be held in Haryana. This is a national sports event in India.

=== Competition ===
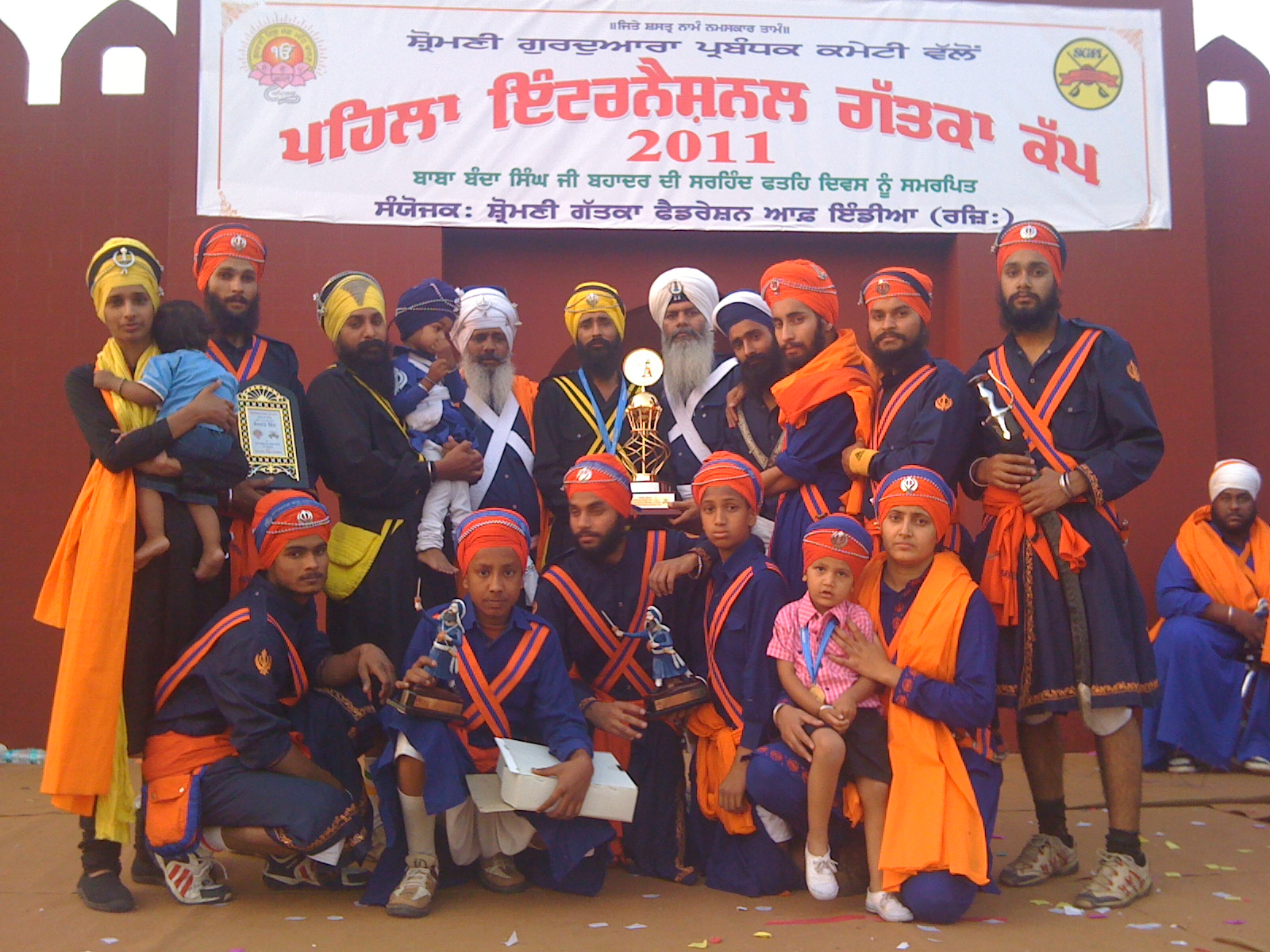
World Gatka Cup 2011

Khel (meaning "sport" or "game") is the modern competitive aspect of gatka, originally used as a method of sword-training (fari‑gatka) or stick-fighting (lathi khela) in medieval times. While khel gatka is today most commonly associated with Sikhs in Punjab, India, it is also practiced to a smaller extent in Punjab and the Hazara region of Pakistan.

== Description ==
A distinction between traditional shastar vidya and gatka is on lethality and exhibitionism, with the former being more lethal while the latter is more performative. There are two forms of gatka, khel (sport) and rasmi (ritualistic). There are at-least three types of gatka described in 1936:

- Each player having two gatka sticks
- Each player having one gatka stick and one shield
- Each player only having one gatka stick (the most popular form)

Each fight is around three-minutes long and consists of alternating offence and defence turns. The assailant earn points by striking the opponent. Clear strikes to the body, head, arms, legs, or feet of the opponent are permitted while hits to the face or ears, and those intended to cause injury, are fouls. Points earned vary depending on what part of the body are struck with one point for the lower body, two points for the upper torso, and three points for the back and head.

Weapons fall into four categories, blunt, bladed, flexible and projectile. Common equipment includes a stick, staff, sword, or shield. The sticks (called soti) are meant to imitate swords, used now for safety reasons. Sotis are fire hardened bamboo, also known as ratan. Shields are known as farri. Other weapons used include the quarterstaff (lathi), bamboo stick with wooden or cloth balls on its ends (marhati), mace (gurj), push-dagger (katar), straight-blade (khanda), curved-sword (kirpan), curved-dagger (bichua), arrow (teer), spear (barcha), and curved-sword (talwār). As a sport, the overall theme is stop and attack, sparring consists of attacking, blocking, and counter-attacking. As a martial-art, it is used for self-defence and combat. For self-defence, aspects such as evasive footwork and practical hand techniques have utility. It is also practised as a means of a healthier lifestyle, as it is believed to have both physical, spiritual, and mental benefits. Both physical and mental disciple is stressed upon. A key aspect important for offence and defence is fluidity and efficiency. The World Gatka Federation mandates seven-oaths for practitioners. The following tournaments are held:

- Single-Soti (individual): one to one
- Single-Soti (team): three players and one extra
- Farri-Soti (individual): one to one
- Farri-Soti (team): three players and one extra
- Weapon demo (individual): one player displaying their skill
- Weapon demo (team): three to five player teams displaying their skills

Four pantras in gatka

Training halls are known as an akhara. Training involves initially learning step methods and bodily movements (such as footwork or a series of whole-body movements, called pentra, which guide extremities in a geometrical pattern), where later on learning how to use weapons is taught in a slow and measured manner. Training consists of meditation (simran). Before fighting, it is customary to do warm-up exercises and stretches, followed by prayers and a traditional salute to the weapons.

As a dance (which requires at least two dancers), it involves practitioners sometimes tying a band around their waist and holding coloured staves and circular dancing around one another and plying or tapping their sticks to the rhythms of a drum, also sitting down and crossing batons. Women perform the dance in privacy. As a religious display, it is usually practiced during the Sikh festivals of Vaisakhi and Gurpurabs. It forms part of the marriage customs of Nihang Sikhs.

== Influence on Defendu ==
The Defendu system devised by Captain William E. Fairbairn and Captain Eric Anthony Sykes borrowed methodologies from Gatka, jujutsu, Chinese martial arts and "gutter fighting". This method was used to train soldiers in close-combat techniques at the Commando Basic Training Centre at Achnacarry in Scotland.

== Weapons in Gatka ==
- Kirpan (knife)
- Talwar (sabre)
- Lathi (stick)
- Chakkar (throwing ring)
- Khanda
- Dhaal (shield)
- Barcha (lance)
- Teer-kamaan (bow and arrow)
- Saif (sword)
- Katar (push dagger)
- Sirohi (cavalry sword)

== See also ==
- Angampora
- Banshay
- Bataireacht
- Bōjutsu
- Commandos (United Kingdom)
- Hola Mohalla
- Indian martial arts
- Jūkendō
- Kalaripayattu
- Kendo
- Kenjutsu
- Krabi–krabong
- Kuttu Varisai
- Mardani khel
- Nihang
- Paika akhada
- Pehlwani
- Pahlevani wrestling
- Shastar Vidya
- Silambam
- Silambam Asia
- Special Operations Executive (SOE)
- Sqay
- Tahtib
- Thang-ta
- Varma kalai
- World Silambam Association
