= World Silambam Association =

International governing body for Silambam

World Silambam Association (உலக சிலம்பம் சங்கம்)
- Sport: Silambam
- Jurisdiction: Worldwide
- Abbreviation: WSA
- Founded: 1999; 27 years ago
- Affiliation: SDG, UN-IGF, UN-Global
- Affiliation date: 2018
- Regional affiliation: World
- Headquarters: Malaysia (doping violation may transfer to Court of Arbitration for Sports (CAS) in Switzerland)
- Location: 3.0424366°N 101.5822714°E
- Chairman: Guruji Murugan Chillayah of Malaysia; Deputy- Thiagu Paramaisuaran
- Vice president(s): VP-1 Vacant; VP-2 Vacant (India) VP-3 Hemalakshmi Rengarajan (India) VP-4 Raja Ramanaiya Naidu
- Secretary: Shalani Rajainderan

Official website
- silambam.world

The World Silambam Association (WSA) (Tamil: உலக சிலம்பம் சங்கம்) is the official international body of Silambam for Worldwide and a recognized Non-Governmental Organization. On 22 November 1999, the primary name of Silambam, which originated from the ancient Tamil Nadu State of India, was documented by Guruji Murugan Chillayah to become the official organization name to provide Indian traditional arts and sports for education, health, fitness, culture, nature, climate change, recreation, and dissemination work. The primary name Silambam was legally registered and recognized as a formalized organization after receiving security clearance approval from the Regulatory Authority. It was followed by the formation of Silambam Asia, registered with members from twelve countries on the Asia continent and officially recognized by the United Nations, which has expanded and grown further throughout the Asia continent and worldwide. The World Silambam Association which was established with the Ministry of Home Affairs (JPPM) in Malaysia, has more than 25 country members from five continents worldwide and is rapidly expanding to preserve and safeguard the essence of Silambam worldwide. World Silambam Association (WSA) was officially recognized by the United Nations and is in partnership with the United Nations Sustainable Development Goals.

== Mission and values ==
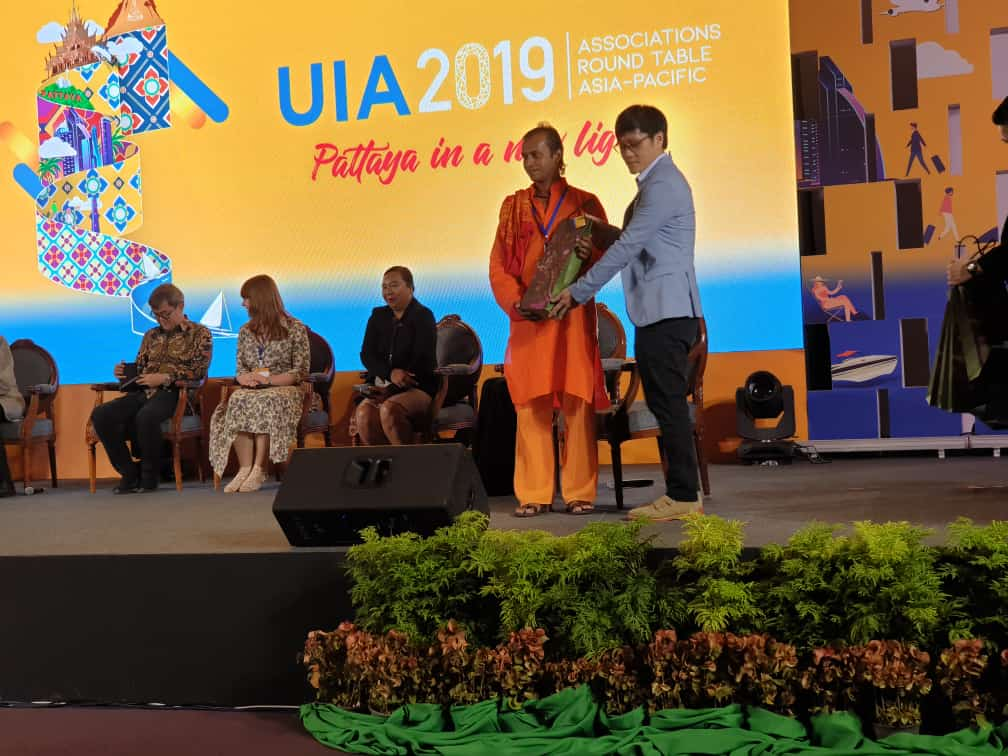
Founder of World Silambam Association was elected as a Speaker for UIA-TCEB during 7th. Round Table Asia-Pacific 2019 in Pattaya, Thailand. Honored and welcomed by Director of Thailand Convention and Exhibition Bureau (TCEB) Mr. Sutichai Bunditvorapoom.

The mission of the World Silambam Association (WSA) to provide effective international governance by constantly improve technical rules and regulating Silambam competitions or participation in International events or sporting arena, to be recognized as an Olympic sport and Paralympic sport.

The World Silambam Association (WSA) actively serves as an international body for the governance and sustainable development of Indian Traditional Martial Arts and Sports. It focuses on areas such as education, health, fitness, culture, nature, climate change, and recreation. The WSA plays a crucial role in providing expertise to its members through training, research, and efforts to revive, rejuvenate, retain, and restore these traditional practices.

By establishing Silambam in both traditional arts and modern sports games to group everyone collectively in similar activities, World Silambam Association (WSA) aims to promote the sustainability for members and the members' visibility worldwide.

== Competition and events ==
Most common domestic/international Silambam competition categories for practitioners.

| Silambam (சிலம்பம்) | Silambam Sala Varisai (சிலம்பம் - சலவரிசை); Synchronized Pattern ஒத்திசை விளையாட்டு (Freestyle performance is based on Silambam techniques, with the addition of music and choreography.) | Individual (Tani Tiramai) (ஆண் மற்றும் பெண் - தனி திறமை); Men and Women |
| Silambam (சிலம்பம்) | Silambam Sala Varisai (சிலம்பம் - சலவரிசை); Synchronized Pattern ஒத்திசை விளையாட்டு (Freestyle performance is based on Silambam techniques, with the addition of music and choreography.) | Pair and Team (Kulu Potti) (ஜோடி மற்றும் குழு போட்டி); Men and Women |
| Silambam (சிலம்பம்) | Kai Silambam / Kuttu Varisai Sala Varisai (குத்து வரிசை / கை சிலம்பம் - சலவரிசை); Synchronized Pattern ஒத்திசை விளையாட்டு (Freestyle performance is based on Silambam techniques, with the addition of music and choreography.) | Individual (Tani Tiramai) (ஆண் மற்றும் பெண் - தனி திறமை); Men and Women |
| Silambam (சிலம்பம்) | Kai Silambam / Kuttu Varisai Sala Varisai (குத்து வரிசை / கை சிலம்பம் - சலவரிசை); Synchronized Pattern ஒத்திசை விளையாட்டு (Freestyle performance is based on Silambam techniques, with the addition of music and choreography.) | Pair and Team (Kulu Potti) (ஜோடி மற்றும் குழு போட்டி); Men and Women |
| Silambam (சிலம்பம்) | Silambam Staff Fencing (சிலம்பாட்டச் சண்டை -போட்டி); Staff Fencing / Sparring (Silambam Sandai) | Individual (தனி நபர் - ஆண்கள் பிரிவு போட்டி); Men |
| Silambam (சிலம்பம்) | Silambam Staff Fencing (சிலம்பாட்டச் சண்டை -போட்டி); Staff Fencing / Sparring (Silambam Sandai) | Individual (தனி நபர் - பெண்கள் பிரிவு போட்டி); Women |

== Silambam Age Divisions ==
Official Silambam World Championship Age Divisions (சிலம்பம் வயது பிரிவு) for both Boys and Girls in Individual and Team. Athletes under 13-years of age are not allowed to play in any official Silambam World Championship, also in the events organized either under the auspices or sanctioned by the World Silambam Association. The lower age limit for all Tournaments is 13-years (calendar year on Tournament Registration Date).

National Federation (NF) should use the term YOUTH to define "Cadets" and "Juniors" for age groups from 13–18 years, that are different from the Cadet and Junior ages.

The following age categories are recognized by the World Silambam Association (WSA) categories which are divided into men and women divisions, and classified into as follows:

| # | Discipline | Parents / Guardians Consent | Age |
|---|---|---|---|
CATEGORY
| 1 | Sub-Junior (Children - Boys & Girls) | Yes; Parent/Guardian Consent REQUIRED. (பெற்றோர் / பாதுகாவலர் ஒப்புதல் தேவை) | 9, 10, 11, 12 |
| 2 | Cadet | Yes; Parent/Guardian Consent REQUIRED. (பெற்றோர் / பாதுகாவலர் ஒப்புதல் தேவை) | 13, 14, 15 |
| 3 | Junior | Yes; Parent/Guardian Consent REQUIRED. (பெற்றோர் / பாதுகாவலர் ஒப்புதல் தேவை) | 16, 17 |
| 4 | U-21 | No | 18, 19, 20, 21 |
| 5 | Senior | No | 18 - 34 |
GAMES
| 1 | Open Championship | Depends; Parent/Guardian Consent REQUIRED for Silambam Players age less than 18 years on Tournament Registration Date. (18 வயதுக்கு குறைவான வீரர் - பெற்றோர் / பாதுகாவலர் ஒப்புதல் தேவை) | 13 - 34 |
| 2 | Continental Championship | Depends; Parent/Guardian Consent REQUIRED for Silambam Players age less than 18 years on Tournament Registration Date. (18 வயதுக்கு குறைவான வீரர் - பெற்றோர் / பாதுகாவலர் ஒப்புதல் தேவை) | 13 - 34 |
| 3 | World Championship | Depends; Parent/Guardian Consent REQUIRED for Silambam Players age less than 18 years on Tournament Registration Date. (18 வயதுக்கு குறைவான வீரர் - பெற்றோர் / பாதுகாவலர் ஒப்புதல் தேவை) | 13 - 34 |
| 4 | Masters Championship | No | 35 - 60+ |

== Silambam Weight Divisions ==
Tournament Format and Schedules for the Silambam World Championship.

The Tournaments: Masters, Continental Championship Senior, Junior and Cadet, World Championship Senior, Junior, and Cadet - normally consist of two sessions, the preliminaries, and the final block. The Tournament phases that take place in the sessions depend on the type of event. Any changes to this will be agreed upon and approved by the World Silambam Association (WSA). Depending on the number of the Silambam Players some rounds may not be required for every category. The Silambam World Championship events schedule for the non-World Silambam Association (WSA) should be agreed by all interested parties.

Players will be weighed using an electronic weighing machine. Must be within the weight criteria.

SUB-JUNIOR
| 1 | 20.000 KG – 25.000 KG |
| 2 | 25.001 KG – 30.000 KG |
| 3 | 30.001 KG – 35.000 KG |
| 4 | 35.001 KG – 40.000 KG |
| 5 | 40.001 KG – 50.000 KG < |
CADET
| 1 | 30.000 KG – 35.000 KG |
| 2 | 35.001 KG – 40.000 KG |
| 3 | 40.001 KG – 45.000 KG |
| 4 | 45.001 KG – 50.000 KG |
| 5 | 50.001 KG – 55.000 KG |
| 6 | 55.001 KG – 62.000 KG |
| 7 | 62.001 KG – 75.000 KG < |
JUNIOR
| 1 | 35.000 KG – 42.000 KG |
| 2 | 42.001 KG – 49.000 KG |
| 3 | 49.001 KG – 59.000 KG |
| 4 | 59.001 KG – 70.000 KG |
| 5 | 70.001 KG – 85.000 KG < |
SENIOR
| 1 | 40.000 KG – 48.000 KG |
| 2 | 48.001 KG – 56.000 KG |
| 3 | 56.001 KG – 64.000 KG |
| 4 | 64.001 KG – 72.000 KG |
| 5 | 72.001 KG – 80.000 KG |
| 6 | 80.001 KG – 88.000 KG |
| 7 | 88.001 KG – 105.000 KG < |

Silambam World Championship required the competitors to be in good physical condition. It demands a lot of stamina and endurance to be able to compete in this event. Any overweight or not within weight criteria will not be allowed to participate in the Silambam Sports event due to health concerns.

== See also ==
- Angampora
- Banshay
- Bataireacht
- Bōjutsu
- Gatka
- Jūkendō
- Kalaripayattu
- Kendo
- Kenjutsu
- Krabi–krabong
- Kuttu Varisai
- Mardani khel
- Silambam
- Silambam Asia
- Tahtib
- Thang-ta
- Varma kalai
- World Silambam Association
