= K. Pajanivel =

Indian martial artist and coach

Personal information
- Full name: Kaliappan Pajanivel
- Nationality: Indian
- Citizenship: India
- Born: January 30, 1973 (age 53) Pooranankuppam, Pondicherry, India
- Occupations: Silambam practitioner, martial arts instructor, performer

Sport
- Country: India
- Sport: Silambam
- Club: Mamallan Silambam and Folk Art Development Club
- Coached by: Master Rajaram

Kaliappan Pajanivel (born 30 January 1973) is an Indian Silambam practitioner, martial arts instructor and performer from Puducherry. He is known for his work in the preservation and promotion of Silambam, a traditional martial art of Tamil Nadu. He received the Sangeet Natak Akademi Award for Martial Arts in 2023 and the Padma Shri in 2026.

== Early life and career ==
K. Pajanivel was born on 30 January 1973 in Pooranankuppam, Pondicherry. He learnt Silambam under Master Rajaram and subsequently trained in other traditional South Indian martial arts such as Kuthu Varisai and Kalaripayattu. In 2002, he won the international Silambam championship in the 56–60 kg category held at Tiruchirappalli, and in 2004 won the national championship in the 55–60 kg category at Nagercoil.

In 2022, Pajanivel established the Mamallan Silambam and Folk Art Development Club in Puducherry. Through the institution, he has trained more than 5,000 students in Silambam and has organised free training camps for schoolchildren.

He has also trained students from Germany, France, Italy and Brazil in Silambam. He served as a referee at Silambam competitions.

== Awards and honours ==
Pajanivel received the Silambam International Award in 2002, the Best Youth Award from Nehru Yuva Kendra Sangathan in 2004, and the Kalaimamani Award from the Government of Puducherry in 2012. He has also received honours such as the "Natupura Kalai Semmal", "Silamba Kalai Kalanjiyam", "Silamba Kalai Sudar", "Silamba Kalai Kalaimani" and "Lifetime Achievement" awards from various organisations.

In 2023, he received the Sangeet Natak Akademi Award for Martial Arts in recognition of his contribution to the field. In 2026, he was awarded the Padma Shri, India's fourth-highest civilian honour.

== See also ==
- Silambam
- 2026 in Indian sports
