= Silambam Asia =

Official body on Indian martial arts

Silambam Asia (சிலம்பம் ஆசியா)
- Sport: Silambam
- Jurisdiction: Worldwide
- Abbreviation: SILA
- Founded: July 10, 2014; 11 years ago
- Affiliation: United Nations, SDG, UN-IGF, UN-Global
- Regional affiliation: Continent
- Headquarters: Singapore
- Location: 3.0424366°N 101.5822714°E
- Chairman: Guruji Murugan Chillayah of Malaysia; Deputy- Thiagu Paramaisuaran
- Vice president(s): VP-1 Vacant; VP-2 Vacant (India) VP-3 Hemalakshmi Rengarajan (India) VP-4 Raja Ramanaiya Naidu
- Secretary: Shalani Rajainderan

Official website
- silambam.asia

The Silambam Asia (SILA) (Tamil: சிலம்பம் ஆசியா) (IAST: Silambam Āsiyā) is the official international body of Silambam for the Continent of Asia and a Non-Governmental Organization recognized by the World Silambam Association (WSA). On November 22, 1999, the primary name of Silambam, which originated from the ancient Tamil Nadu State of India, was documented by Guruji Murugan Chillayah to become the official organization name to provide Indian traditional arts and sports for education, health, fitness, culture, nature, climate change, recreation, and dissemination work. The primary name Silambam was legally registered and recognized as a formalized organization after receiving security clearance approval from the Regulatory Authority. It was followed by the formation of Silambam Asia, registered with members from twelve countries on the Asia continent and officially recognized by the United Nations, which has expanded and grown further throughout the Asia continent and worldwide. Silambam Asia (SILA) is in partnership with the United Nations Sustainable Development Goals to preserve and safeguard the Indian traditional arts, sports, cultural and educational content within Silambam at the regional or continental by the establishment of Silambam Asia with the Ministry of Home Affairs (JPPM) in Malaysia.

== History ==
Silambam first gained international recognition when the United Nations Assembly Committee for Economic and Social Council recommended Silambam Asia for status during an event held at the United Nations headquarters in New York City, United States on January 21, 2019. On January 30, 2019, concluded substantive work as the Committee recommended Silambam Asia for status in the United Nations.

== Mission and values ==
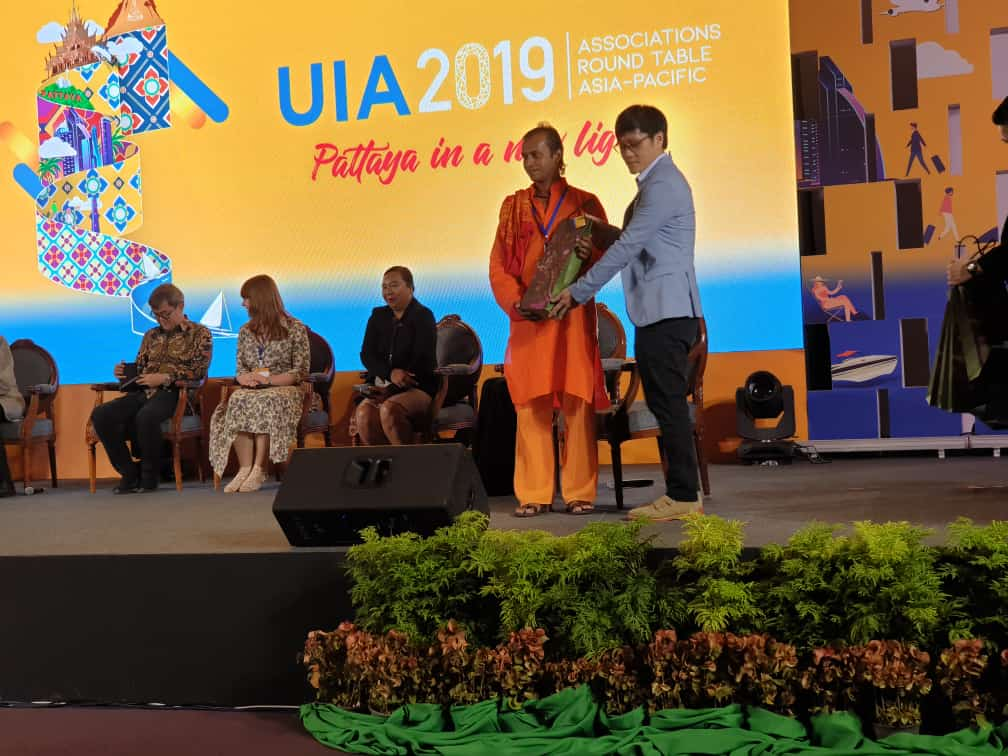
Founder of Silambam Asia was elected as a Speaker for UIA-TCEB during 7th. Round Table Asia-Pacific 2019 in Pattaya, Thailand. Honored and welcomed by Director of Thailand Convention and Exhibition Bureau (TCEB) Mr. Sutichai Bunditvorapoom.

The mission of Silambam Asia as an umbrella organization of the World Silambam Association (WSA) to provide effective international governance by constantly improve technical rules and regulating Silambam competitions or participation in International events or sporting arena, to be recognized as an Olympic sport and Paralympic sport.

Silambam Asia also plays active roles as an international organization for governance and sustainable development on the Indian Traditional Martial Arts and Sports for Education, Health, Fitness, Culture, Nature, Climate Change, Recreational, and dissemination all these related information. Thus, the vital role to provide expertise for members by providing the Training, Research, Revive, Rejuvenate, Retention, and Restore.

By establishing Silambam in both traditional arts and modern sports games to group everyone collectively in similar activities, Silambam Asia aims to promote the sustainability for members and the members' visibility worldwide.

== Competition and events ==
Most common domestic/international Silambam competition categories for practitioners.

Silambam (சிலம்பம்)	Silambam Sala Varisai (சிலம்பம் - சலவரிசை); Synchronized Pattern ஒத்திசை விளையாட்டு (Freestyle performance is based on Silambam techniques, with the addition of music and choreography.)	Individual (Tani Tiramai) (ஆண் மற்றும் பெண் - தனி திறமை); Men and Women
Silambam (சிலம்பம்)	Silambam Sala Varisai (சிலம்பம் - சலவரிசை); Synchronized Pattern ஒத்திசை விளையாட்டு (Freestyle performance is based on Silambam techniques, with the addition of music and choreography.)	Pair and Team (Kulu Potti) (ஜோடி மற்றும் குழு போட்டி); Men and Women
Silambam (சிலம்பம்)	Kai Silambam / Kuttu Varisai Sala Varisai (குத்து வரிசை / கை சிலம்பம் - சலவரிசை); Synchronized Pattern ஒத்திசை விளையாட்டு (Freestyle performance is based on Silambam techniques, with the addition of music and choreography.)	Individual (Tani Tiramai) (ஆண் மற்றும் பெண் - தனி திறமை); Men and Women
Silambam (சிலம்பம்)	Kai Silambam / Kuttu Varisai Sala Varisai (குத்து வரிசை / கை சிலம்பம் - சலவரிசை); Synchronized Pattern ஒத்திசை விளையாட்டு (Freestyle performance is based on Silambam techniques, with the addition of music and choreography.)	Pair and Team (Kulu Potti) (ஜோடி மற்றும் குழு போட்டி); Men and Women
Silambam (சிலம்பம்)	Silambam Staff Fencing (சிலம்பாட்டச் சண்டை -போட்டி); Staff Fencing / Sparring (Silambam Sandai)	Individual (தனி நபர் - ஆண்கள் பிரிவு போட்டி); Men
Silambam (சிலம்பம்)	Silambam Staff Fencing (சிலம்பாட்டச் சண்டை -போட்டி); Staff Fencing / Sparring (Silambam Sandai)	Individual (தனி நபர் - பெண்கள் பிரிவு போட்டி); Women

== See also ==
- Angampora
- Banshay
- Bataireacht
- Bōjutsu
- Gatka
- Jūkendō
- Kalaripayattu
- Kendo
- Kenjutsu
- Krabi–krabong
- Kuttu Varisai
- Mardani khel
- Silambam
- Tahtib
- Thang-ta
- Varma kalai
- World Silambam Association
