= Musti-yuddha =

Traditional combat sport originating from the Indian subcontinent

Musti-Yuddha
- Focus: Striking, Hybrid
- Hardness: Full-contact
- Country of origin: (India) india
- Descendant arts: Muaythai, Kickboxing, Muay Boran, Lethwei, Bando, Kun khmer, Bokator, Viet vo dao, Thaing, Tomoi, Silat, Muay Lao, Muay lai lao, Pencak silat, Panantukan, Sikaran, Yaw-Yan,
- Olympic sport: No
- Meaning: Fist combat, Fist fighting

Musti-Yuddha (Sanskrit: मुष्टि युद्ध) is a traditional combat sport originating from the Indian subcontinent. The term literally means "fist combat", from the Sanskrit words muṣṭi (fist) and yuddha (fight, battle, conflict). While this would originally have been used as a general term for any boxing art, today it usually refers to muki boxing from Varanasi, the only surviving unarmed style. In the Punjab there still exists an armed form of boxing called loh-musti in which the fighters wear a kara on one hand, although it is no longer used for sparring.

Aspiring fighters undergo years of apprenticeship, toughening their fists against stone and other hard surfaces, until they are able to break coconuts and rocks with their bare hands. Any part of the body may be targeted, except the groin, but the prime targets are the head and chest. Techniques incorporate a variety of punches, kicks and grabs. Boxers wear no form of protection and fight bare-fisted. Matches may be one-on-one, one against a group, or group against group. Victory can be attained by knockout, ringout or submission.

The martial art is related to other forms of martial arts found in other parts of the Indian cultural sphere including Muay Thai in Thailand, Muay Lao in Laos, Pradal Serey in Cambodia and Lethwei in Myanmar.

== History ==
Various types of boxing existed in ancient India. The earliest references to musti-yuddha come from classical Vedic epics such as the Ramayana and Rig Veda. The Mahabharata describes two combatants boxing with clenched fists and fighting with kicks, finger strikes, knee strikes and headbutts. Duels (niyuddham) were often fought to the death. During the period of the Western Satraps, the ruler Rudradaman - in addition to being well-versed in "the great sciences" which included Indian classical music, Sanskrit grammar, and logic - was said to be an excellent horseman, charioteer, elephant rider, swordsman and boxer. The Gurbilas Shemi, an 18th-century Sikh text, gives numerous references to musti-yuddha.

The French General Allard commented on the boxing practiced by the early 19th-century Lahore army that "Duelling is not known in the army of Ranjit Singh. The soldiers settle their disputes with their fists; a brutal, and equally un-Christian, method of adjusting differences." The particular form of boxing he referred to was loh-musti, practiced primarily in the northwest.

The British colonial introduction of western boxing in the 1890s caused a decline in native musti-yuddha, until only muki boxing survived in Varanasi. A city considered holy to Hindus, Varanasi has a tradition of annual boxing festivals dating back more than 300 years. Injuries were frequent and often severe. The most famous post-independence fighters include Narayanguru Balambhat Deodhar and Lakshmanguru Balambhat Deodhar, both of whom were said to have been able to defeat 12 men at once. Musti-yuddha has become increasingly rare over time and by the 1960s was already being pushed further underground. Illegal matches are still held in Kolkata today and are frequented by gamblers.

== See also ==
- Malla-yuddha
- Vajra-mushti
