= Sqay =

Kashmiri martial art

Sqay is a South Asian martial art from Kashmir which involves fighting with a sword and shield.

== History ==
Nazir Ahmad Mir, a sqay grandmaster, played a significant role in reviving the martial art's popularity; he began promoting sqay from the 1980s onwards in Kashmir, and did international demonstrations in various countries. He eventually started an organisation which helped promote sqay globally.

In 2023, the Indian Army's Chinar Corps organized a Sqay session for girls in the Shopian district of Kashmir. Sqay is one of 43 sports to be included in the 2023 National Games of India.

== International ==
ICSQAY member of GAAPSF and ISNO.
