= Jūkendō =

Japanese bayonet fighting martial art

Jūkendō (銃剣道)
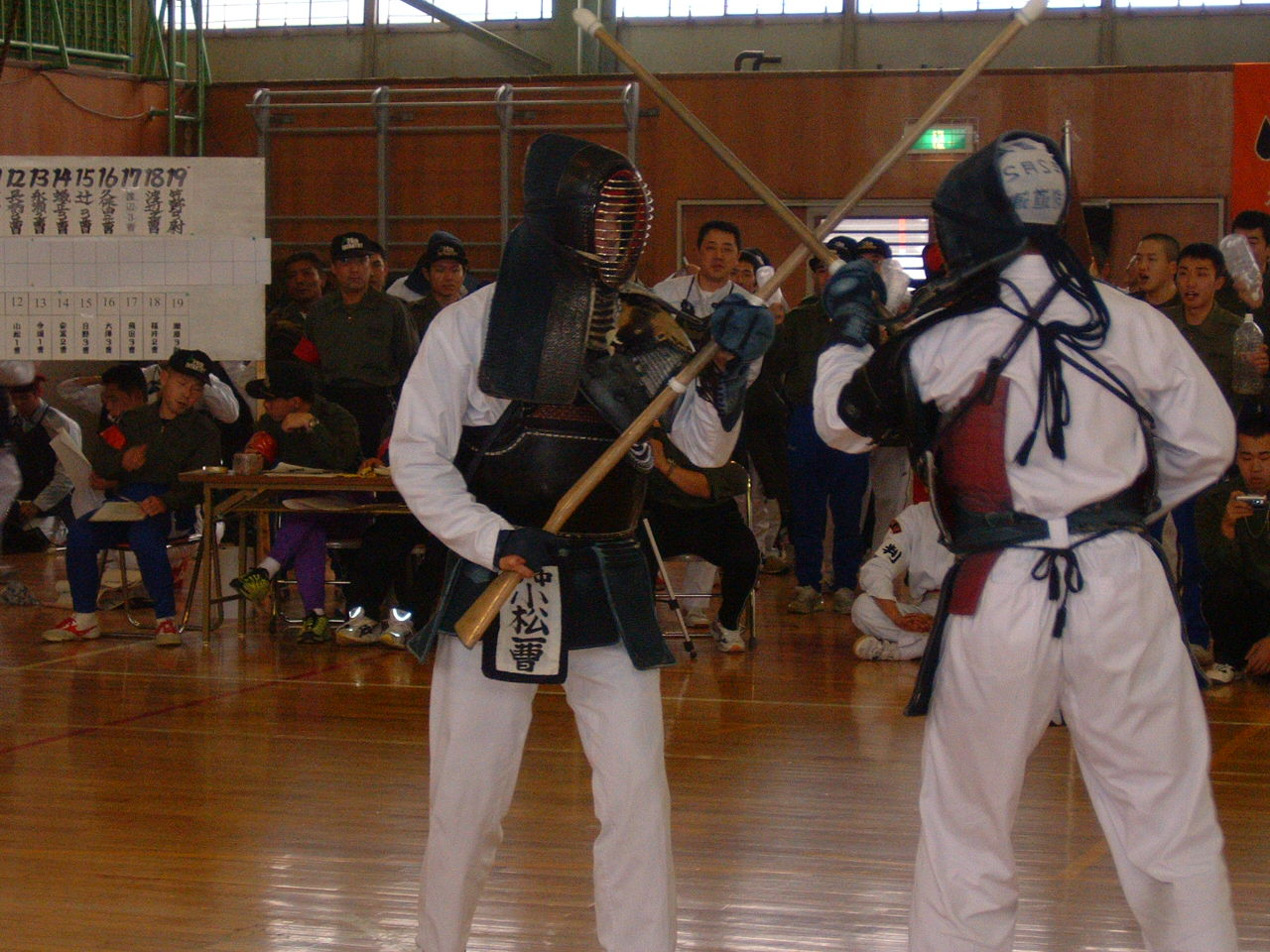
- Focus: Bayonet
- Hardness: Competitive
- Country of origin: Japan
- Creator: No single creator
- Parenthood: Historical
- Olympic sport: No
- Official website: https://jukendo.online/

Jūkendō (銃剣道) is the Japanese martial art of bayonet fighting, and has been likened to kendo (but with bayonets instead of swords).

According to Tanaka Fumon, jūkendō techniques are based on Japanese sojutsu (spear fighting) and 19th century French bayonet fighting techniques. However, according to French jūkendō researcher Baptiste Tavernier, jūkendō techniques are mostly based on the teachings and influence of the French military missions to Japan at the beginning of the Meiji era.

During the Meiji period, Japanese bayonet fighting techniques were consolidated into a system named jūkenjutsu, and taught at the Toyama military academy in Tokyo. Morihei Ueshiba, founder of Aikido, trained in jūkenjutsu and incorporated some of this art's techniques into his own interpretation of the use of the wooden staff or jō. Following World War II, the practice of jūkenjutsu was banned by the Allies, but it later returned in the modern form of jūkendō. The Japan Amateur Jūkendō Federation was established in 1952. The All Japan Jūkendō Federation was established in April 1956.

In response to a request from the 30,000 member All-Japan Jūkendō Federation in April 2017, the Japanese government added jūkendō to the list of nine approved martial arts for Japanese junior high schools. As of 2017 only one school had taken it up.

Modern jūkendō uses a mokujū (木銃), a wooden replica of a rifle with an attached and blunted bayonet at the end, in place of an actual rifle. The art is practised by both Japanese military personnel and civilians. Training incorporates kata (patterns), two-person drills, and competitive matches using mokujū and protective armor. The three main target areas are the heart, throat, and lower left side of the opponent.

== See also ==
- Angampora
- Banshay
- Bataireacht
- Bōjutsu
- Gatka
- Kalaripayattu
- Kendo
- Kenjutsu
- Krabi–krabong
- Kuttu Varisai
- Mardani khel
- Silambam
- Silambam Asia
- Tahtib
- Thang-ta
- Varma kalai
- World Silambam Association
- Jōdō
- Kenshiro Abbe
- Aiki-jō
- Aikido
