= Bōjutsu =

Japanese martial art of staff fighting using a bō

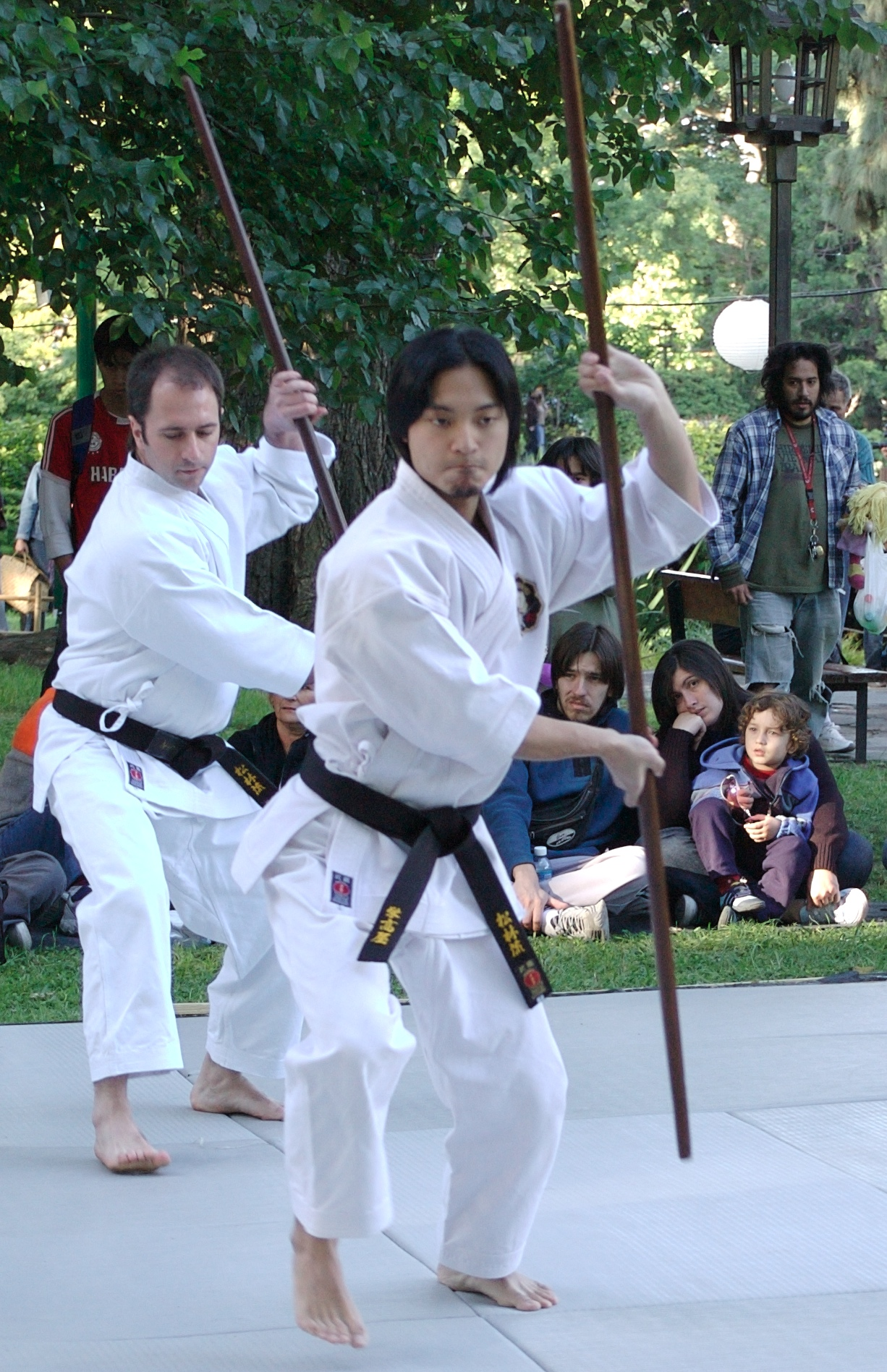
- Bōjutsu demonstration
- Also known as: Art of the staff
- Focus: Weaponry
- Country of origin: Ryūkyū Kingdom; Japan
- Creator: Various
- Olympic sport: No

Bōjutsu (Japanese: 棒術, lit. 'staff technique') is the martial art of stick fighting using a bō, which is the Japanese word for staff. Staffs have been in use for thousands of years in Asian martial arts like Silambam. Some techniques involve slashing, swinging, and stabbing with the staff. Others involve using the staff as a vaulting pole or as a prop for hand-to-hand strikes.

Today bōjutsu is usually associated either with Okinawan kobudō or with Japanese koryū budō. Japanese bōjutsu is one of the core elements of classical martial training.

Thrusting, swinging, and striking techniques often resemble empty-hand movements, following the philosophy that the bō is merely an "extension of one’s limbs". Consequently, bōjutsu is often incorporated into other styles of empty-hand fighting, like traditional Jū-jutsu, and karate.

In the Okinawan context, the weapon is frequently referred to as the kon (棍).

== See also ==
- Angampora
- Bando
- Banshay
- Bataireacht
- Gatka
- Hanbō
- Jogo do pau
- Jō
- Jōjutsu
- Jūkendō
- Kalaripayattu
- Kanabō
- Kbachkun boraan
- Kendo
- Kenjutsu
- Krabi–krabong
- Kuttu Varisai
- Lethwei
- Mardani khel
- Naban
- Quarterstaff
- Silambam Asia
- Silambam
- Tahtib
- Tanbō
- Thang-ta
- Three-section staff
- Varma kalai
- World Silambam Association
- Yamanni-ryū
