= Tahtib =

Egyptian martial art and folk dance

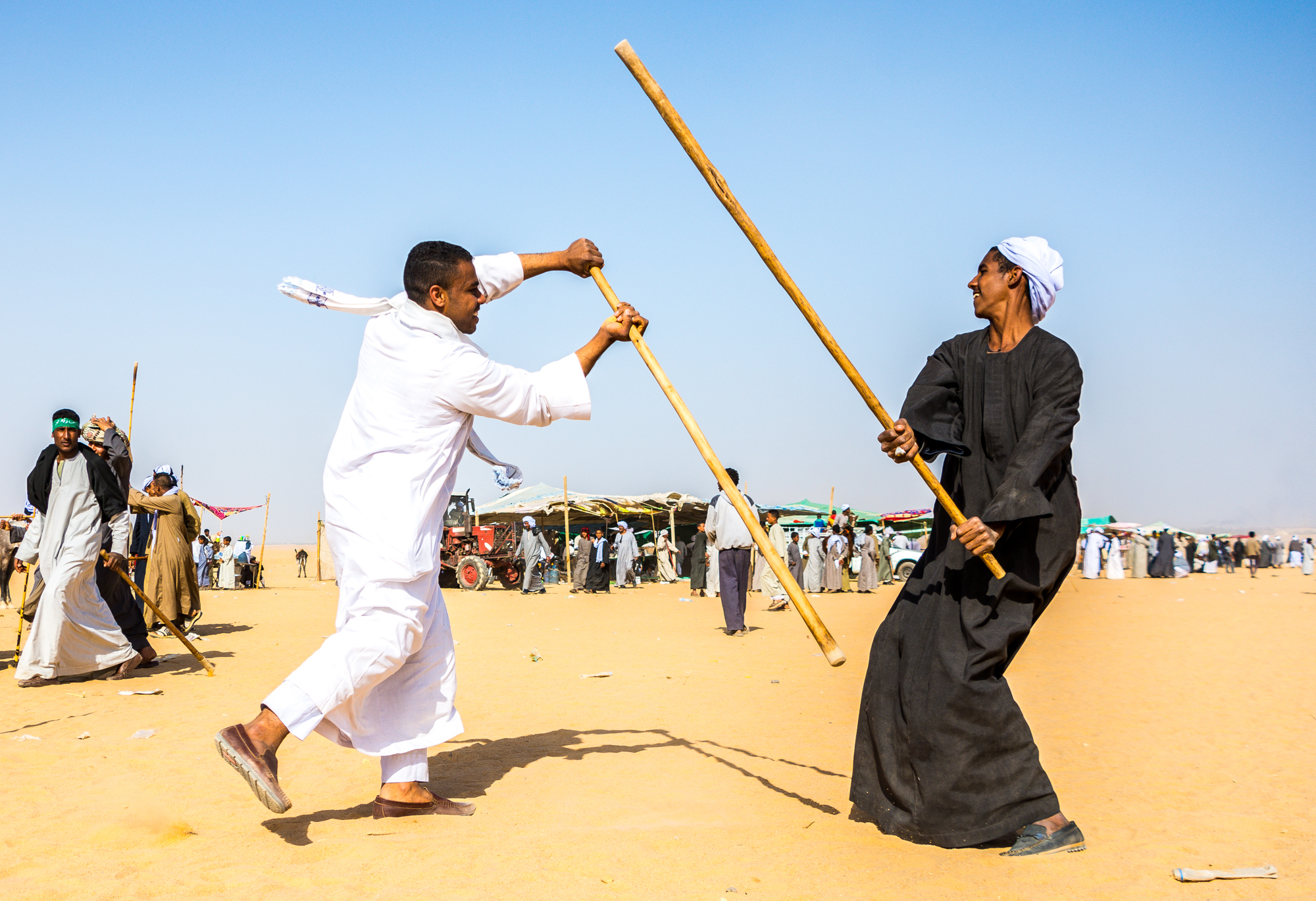
- Egyptian men playing tahtib, 2019
- Also known as: fan a'nazaha wa-tahtib
- Focus: weaponry
- Country of origin: Upper Egypt
- Related arts: stickfighting
- Meaning: the art of being straight and honest through the use of stick

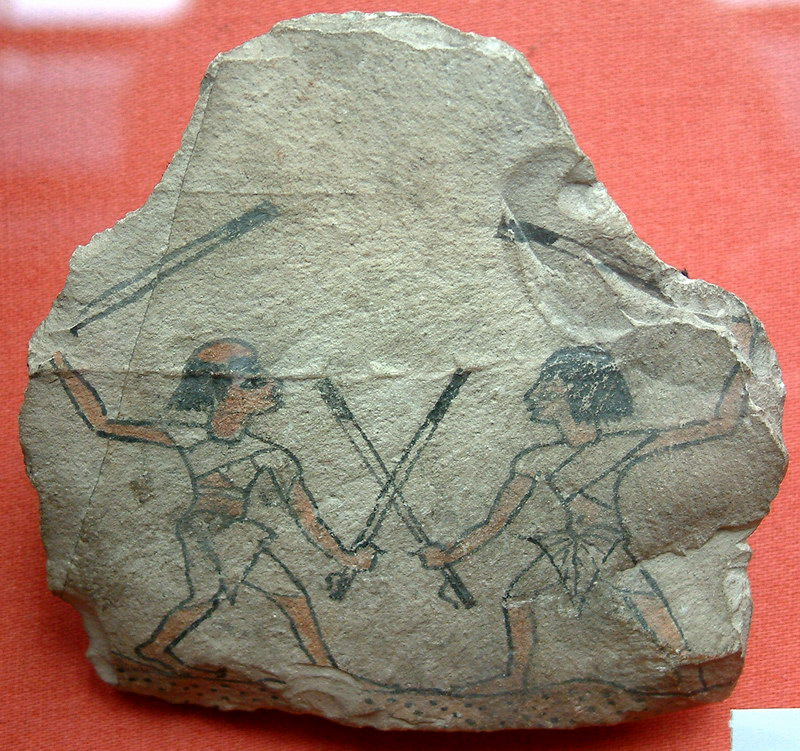
Image of two ancient Egyptian men practicing tahtib on an ostracon

Tahtib (Arabic: تحطيب, romanized: taḥṭīb) is the term for a traditional stick-fighting martial art originally named fan a'nazaha wa-tahtib ("the art of being straight and honest through the use of stick"). The original martial version of tahtib later evolved into an Egyptian folk dance with a wooden stick. It is commonly described in English as a "stick dance", "cane dance", "stick-dancing game", or as ritual mock combat accompanied by music. Nowadays, the word tahtib encompasses both martial practice and performance art. It is mainly practiced today in Upper Egypt. Tahtib is regularly performed for tourists in Luxor and Aswan.

The stick used in tahtib is about four feet in length and is called an asa, asaya, assaya, or nabboot. It is often flailed in large figure-eight patterns across the body with such speed that the displacement of air is loudly discernible.

== History ==
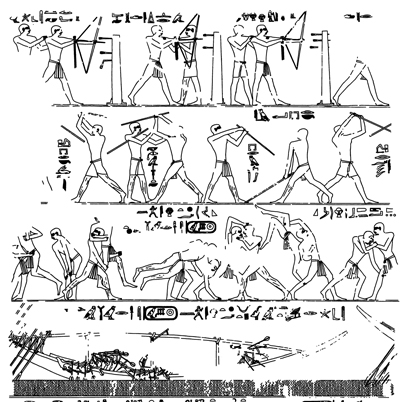
Engravings at the Abusir necropolis showing scenes of archery, wrestling, and stick fighting

The oldest traces of tahtib were found on engravings from the archaeological site of Abusir, an extensive necropolis of the Old Kingdom period, located in the south-western suburbs of Cairo. On some of the reliefs of the Pyramid of Sahure (V dynasty, c. 2500 BC); the images and explanatory captions are particularly precise and accurate in their depiction of what seems to be military training using sticks. Tahtib, with archery and wrestling, was then among the three disciplines of warfare taught to soldiers. Three of the 35 tombs of the Beni Hassan necropolis (XI-XII Dynasties, 1900 – 1700 BC) near the town of Minya, contain engravings showing scenes of tahtib. Similar engravings can be seen in the archaeological site of Tell el Amarna (XVIII Dynasty, 1350 BC), some 60 km south of Minya. In addition to its role as military training, tahtib matches were also popular among peasants and farmers. The first evidence of the festive representation of tahtib can only be seen in the New Empire (1500 – 1000 BC), as shown by the engravings on the walls of Luxor and Saqqâra Early Christian writings mention tahtib as a leisure activity and a popular art performed by men during weddings and celebrations. It is believed that tahtib developed as a game or performance art in this civilian context.

== Performance ==
As with its combative counterpart, the dance form of tahtib was originally performed by men, but female versions were later developed. In one form, the women dress as men and imitate the males. Another female variant is performed flirtatiously and with less aggression. The latter, called ra's el assaya (dance of the stick) is incorporated into cabaret or Raqs sharqi performances. The stick used for this dance is generally more lightweight and hooked at one end like a cane. It is often embellished with metallic-coloured foil or sequins. The costume is a simple baladi dress. Performances include balancing the cane on the head, hip or shoulder.

=== Music ===
Music in tahtib features the tabl (bass drum) and mizmar (folk oboe). The right hand uses a heavier stick with a hooked head to beat out the dum (the deep sound from striking the center of the drum) which drives the heartbeat of the rhythm, while the left hand uses a light twig as a switch to produce rapid-fire staccato "taks" (the higher sound from striking the edge of the drum).

=== Modern tahtib ===
Modern tahtib is an attempt to re-explore the sources of tahtib as a fighting art, and to enrich them as a martial practice by codifying the techniques and teaching them structurally. As in traditional tahtib, the main target is the opponent's head, as it is considered the most fragile and vulnerable part of the body. Consequently, techniques revolve around protecting one's own head while reaching the head of the opponent. Victory can be attained either by a single clean touch to the head, or three touches to the body. Unlike its traditional counterpart, modern tahtib allows both women and men to practice in mixed groups.

== See also ==
- Angampora
- Arnis
- Banshay
- Bartitsu
- Bataireacht
- Bōjutsu
- Gatka
- Jūkendō
- Kalaripayattu
- Kendo
- Kenjutsu
- Krabi–krabong
- Kuttu Varisai
- Mardani khel
- Moresca
- Silambam
- Silambam Asia
- Stick dance (African-American)
- Thang-ta
- Varma kalai
- Kowat Alramy
