= Kbach Kun Khmer Boran =

Cambodian martial art

- Country of origin: Cambodia
- Famous practitioners: Chan Rothana Phoum Nacry Chin Chun
- Olympic sport: No

Kbach Kun Khmer Boran (Khmer: ក្បាច់គុនខ្មែរបុរាណ, lit. 'ancient Khmer martial arts techniques') is the umbrella term encompassing all Khmer martial arts. Among them, figure Bokator (ancient Khmer battlefield martial art), Kun Khmer (formalised kickboxing), Baok Chambab (Khmer traditional wrestling) and Kbach Kun Dambong Veng (Khmer fencing). Cambodian martial arts are a thousand-year-old tradition, as evidenced by archeological vestiges.

== Gallery ==
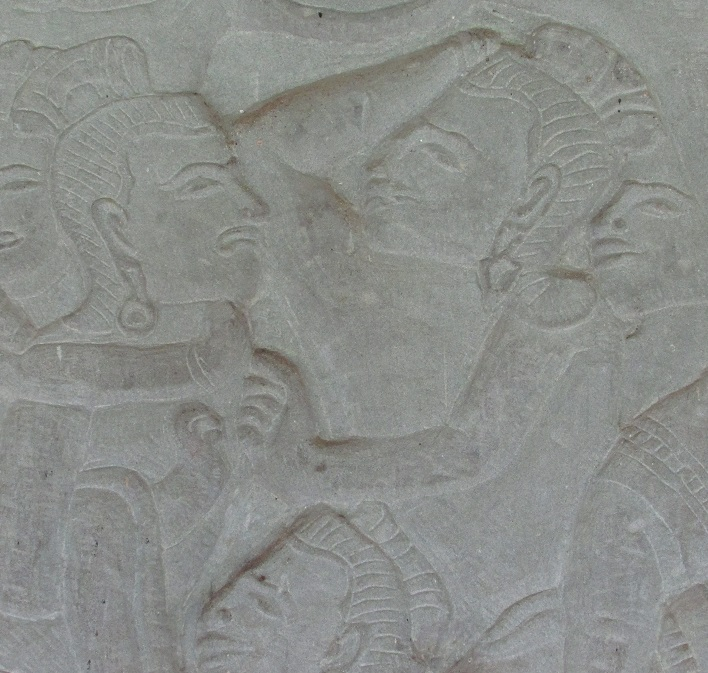
Elbow strike to the head

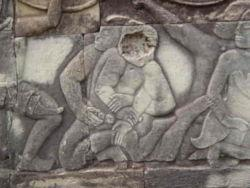
Arm locked submission

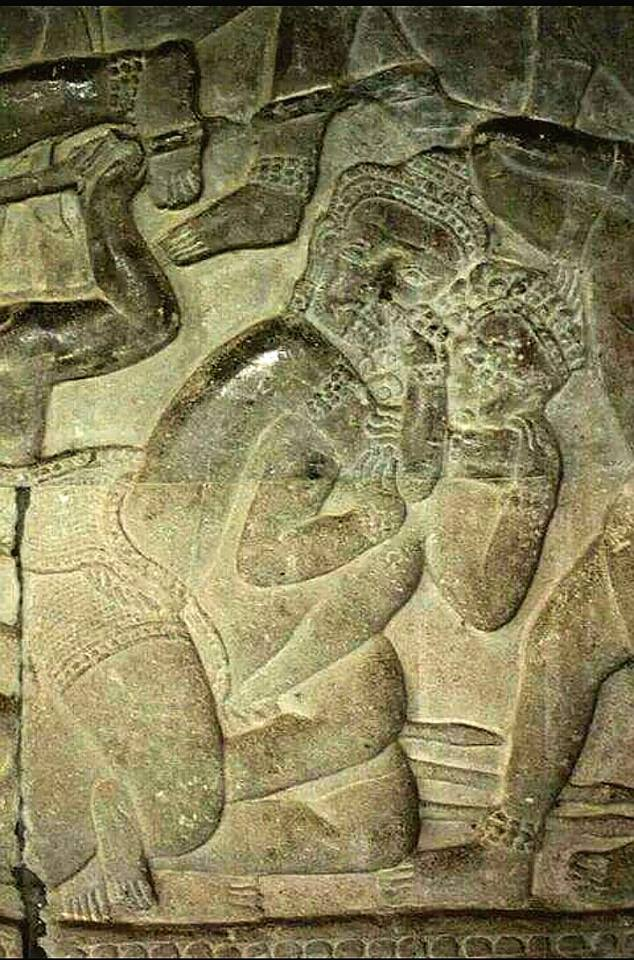
Rear naked choke

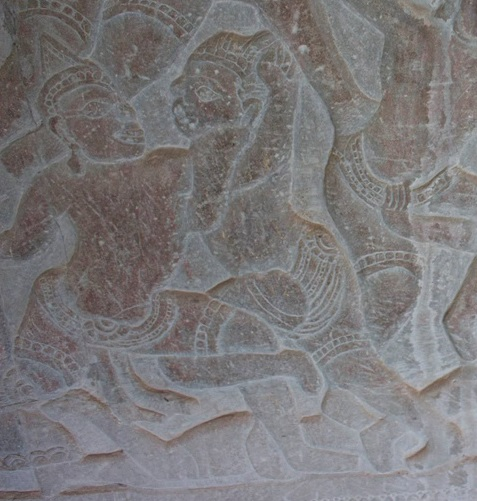
Inside leg sweep

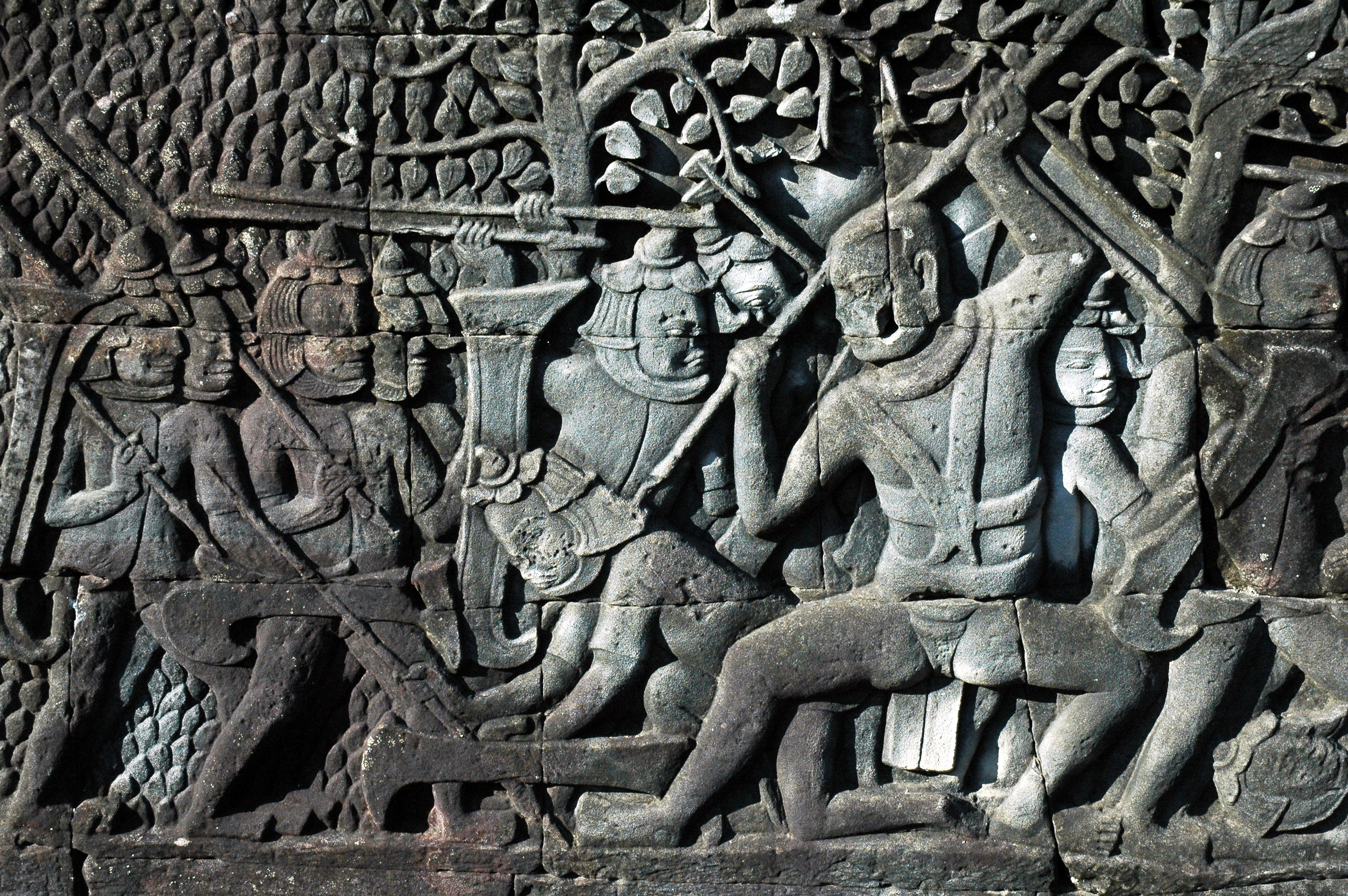
Long staff strikes

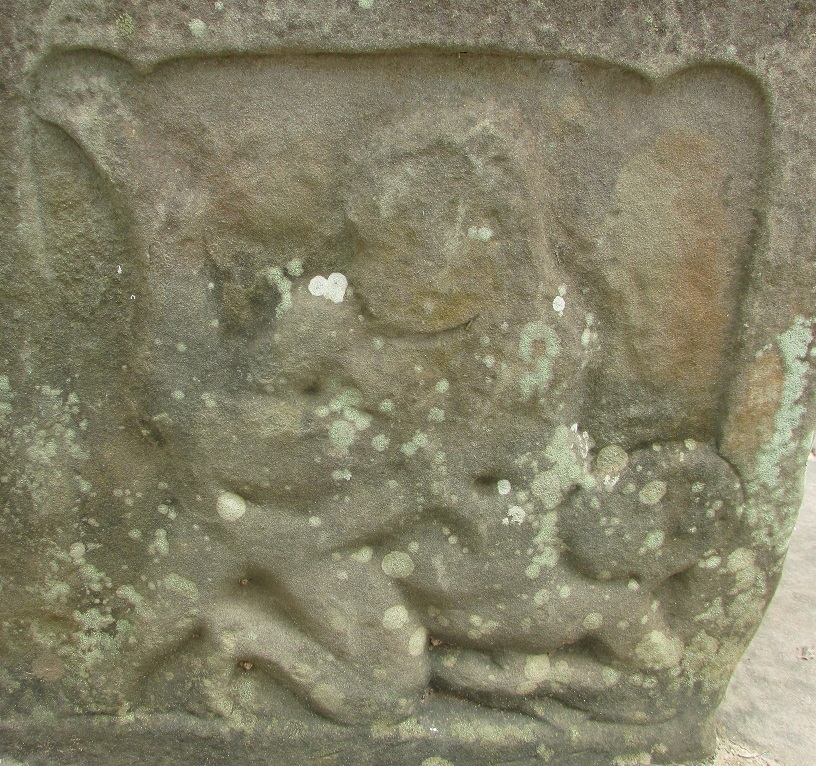
Ground grappling/wrestling

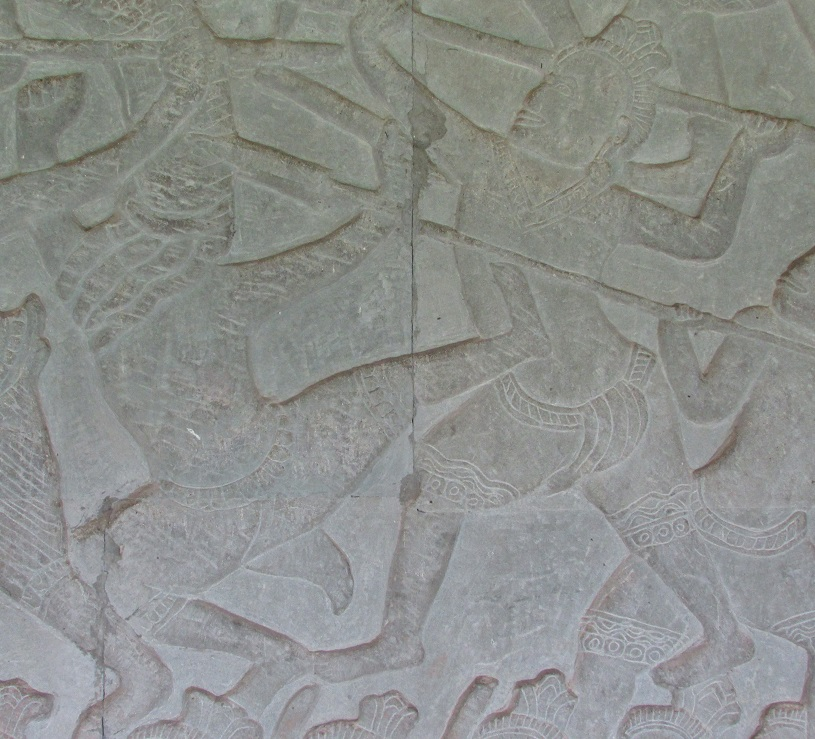
Front kicks to stomach

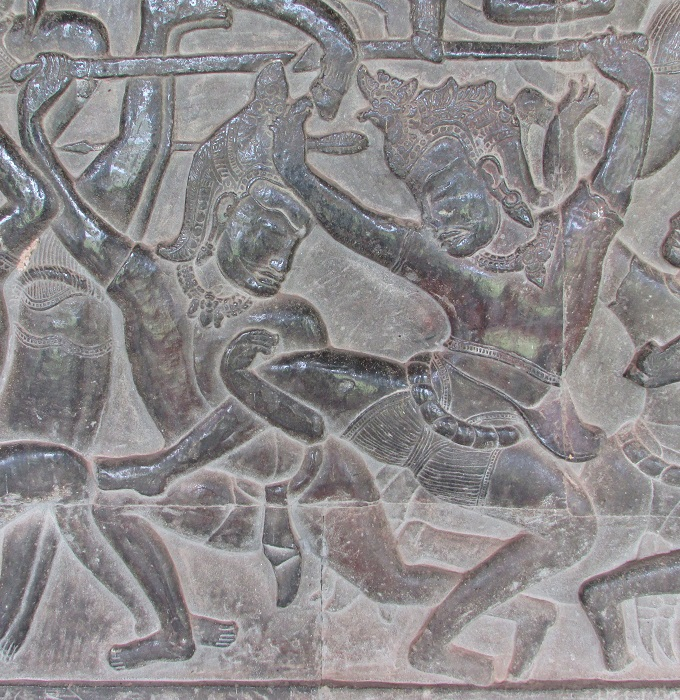
Single leg grab

== See also ==
- Banshay
- Bokator
- Khmer traditional wrestling
- Krabi-krabong
- Pradal serey
- Silambam
- Thang-ta
