= Antonio Graceffo =

American economist and analyst

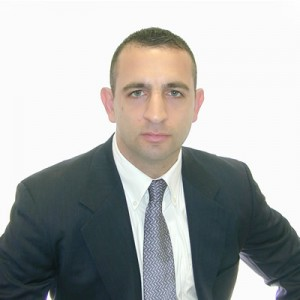
- Born: 1967 (age 58–59)
- Occupations: Economist, analyst & writer

Antonio Graceffo (born September 6, 1967) is an American economist, China analyst, martial artist, and author who has lived in several Asian countries. He is a frequent guest, providing analysis of the Chinese economy and geopolitics, on various shows on New Tang Dynasty Television, including Talking Points, The Wide Angle, China in Focus, and Forbidden News. He is also the host of the web TV show, Martial Arts Odyssey, which traces his ongoing journey through Asia learning martial arts in various countries. Graceffo is credited with helping to revitalize the lost Khmer martial art of Bokator by being the first to report on it in English in the post-Pol Pot era. Beyond martial arts, Graceffo is also a student of multiple languages, including Mandarin Chinese, Thai, Khmer, Vietnamese, German, Spanish, Italian, and French.

== Life and education ==
Born to Sicilian parents, Antonio Graceffo is originally from New York City. When he was nine, his family moved to Tennessee and for the next eight years he spent school days in Tennessee and holidays and summers in New York. He moved back to New York at the age of 17.

Graceffo spent seven years in the United States Armed Forces starting with the Army National Guard. At Fort Benning, Georgia he went through boot camp and completed infantry school. Later, he graduated from Non-Commissioned Officer's Academy. He then served in the Navy and the US Merchant Marines.

As a child, he was identified as having dyslexia and being learning disabled. He was in Special Ed classes until high school. In high school, his grade point average was only 1.7 on a 4-point scale. Guidance councilors told him he would most likely not be able to graduate university, but he read constantly to make up for his lack of formal education.

He graduated from Middle Tennessee State University with a degree in Foreign Language and English. He studied applied linguistics/translation at the University of Mainz in Germany for four years. He also did an advanced Diploma in TESOL at Trinity College, England and did graduate business diplomas through Heriot-Watt University in Scotland. He worked as a translator and teacher in Europe for most of the four years he was in school there and then worked in Costa Rica for one year. After that, he returned to New York and went through a financial training program and worked as a financial planner, and then a wealth manager. Eventually, he became assistant head of private wealth management for a major private bank.

The September 11 attacks prompted him to leave his career as an investment banker on Wall Street to pursue full-time adventure writing in Asia. After arriving in Taiwan in 2001, Graceffo's quest to discover Asia's diverse martial arts led him to the original Shaolin Temple in China and a Muay Thai monastery in Thailand, as well as to Cambodia, Vietnam, Korea, the Philippines, and Burma. While in Burma in 2008, he was targeted by the military junta then ruling the country, because of his support for the Shan people.

== Martial arts achievements ==
In 2005, Graceffo was the first foreign student of the Khmer martial art of Bokator. The story he wrote in Black Belt magazine was the first article ever written about the art in that publication. In 2007, he became one of two Americans promoted on the same day, to the rank of Black Krama in Bokator; they were the first foreigners to obtain this rank. In the same year, he traveled into Burma and shot videos with a master of Lai Tai, a kung fu type art practiced by the Shan people. To date, this is the first video ever shot of the art. In 2009, Antonio was the first non-Muslim student of Silat Kalam, a Muslim martial art in Malaysia, and in 2011 was given a national award, Silat Kalam Warrior. He was the first non-Muslim to receive this award.

== Writing ==
Graceffo is a regular contributor to international news media including The Epoch Times (for which he comments on China's economy) and Black Belt Magazine. He writes about 70 articles per year for various online and print magazines and news outlets, and his byline has also appeared in South China Morning Post, AsiaOne, The Diplomat, War on the Rocks, Asia Times, RealClearWorld, bne IntelliNews, Inkstone, Lowy Institute, Just The News, Penthouse, Highbrow Magazine, New Right Network, Fight Times, and Bow International.

== Books ==
- The Monk From Brooklyn: An American At The Shaolin Temple (July 15, 2004)
- Boat, Bikes, and Boxing Gloves: Adventure Writer in the Kingdom of Siam (April 28, 2005)
- Desert of Death on Three Wheels (June 28, 2005)
- Adventures in Formosa (December 28, 2006)
- Rediscovering The Khmers (August 18, 2008)
- Warrior Odyssey: The Travels of a Martial Artist in Asia (August 1, 2010)
- Khun Khmer: Cambodian Martial Art Diary (November 7, 2011)
- The Wrestler's Dissertation (January 2018)
- A Short Course on the Chinese Economy (March 2018)
- A Deeper Look At The Chinese Economy, From Mao to Xi Jinping and Donald Trump (July 2018)
- Beyond the Belt and Road: China's Global Economic Expansion (March 2019)
