= Martial arts school =

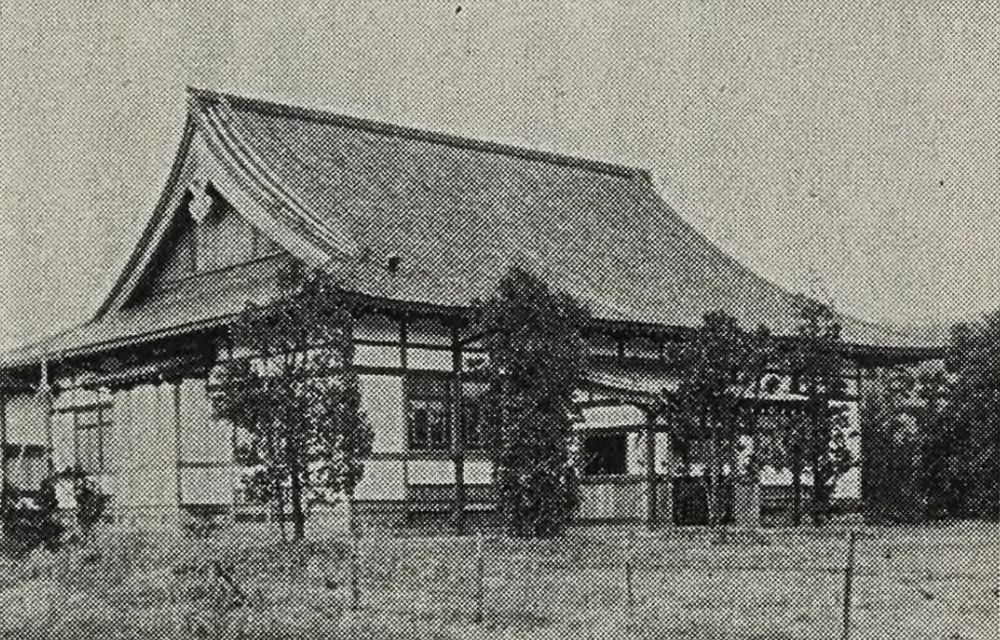
A traditional Japanese martial arts training hall (dōjō), showing the formal architectural style common in established schools

A martial arts school is a formal educational organization and educational institution dedicated to teaching one or more martial arts disciplines for physical, mental, and social development. Scholars such as Paul Bowman and Sixt Wetzler describe martial arts schools as institutions of pedagogy, cultural transmission, and identity formation within the framework of Kulturwissenschaft. Reference works including Encyclopædia Britannica and Oxford Reference identify martial arts schools as educational institutions. In 1978, the United States Internal Revenue Service recognized karate schools as qualifying educational organizations for tax purposes. According to industry research, the martial arts studio sector comprises more than 40,000 schools in the United States, generating annual revenues exceeding US$19 billion.

Region / Tradition	Term (script)	Meaning / Usage	Source
Japanese	Dōjō (道場)	"Place of the way," the formal training hall in arts such as karate, judo, and aikidō.	
Korean	Dojang (도장)	"Training hall," used for taekwondo and related arts.	
Chinese (Cantonese/Mandarin)	Kwoon (館) / Wuguan (武館)	Training hall for Chinese martial arts.	
Indian	Akhara (अखाड़ा)	Gymnasium or ground for wrestling and martial training.	
Global / Modern	Gym	In combat sports and mixed martial arts (MMA), denotes both the training facility and the business organization.	

Scholars note that although these terms primarily denote the "training hall", in English usage they are sometimes extended to mean the martial arts school as an educational institution.

== History ==
Martial arts schools have existed for centuries as organized institutions for the transmission of combat skills. In East Asia, they often functioned in connection with temples, military bodies, or guild associations, combining physical training with ritual, philosophy, and community identity.

In China, civic training halls known as wuguan emerged by the Qing dynasty as sites where martial knowledge was codified, instructors appointed, and student lineages preserved. In India, akharas served as gymnasia, social centers, and arenas of religious discipline, with lineages extending into medieval wrestling traditions.

The founding of the Kodokan Judo Institute by Kanō Jigorō in 1882 in Tokyo marked a turning point: it was deliberately modeled on a modern educational institution, complete with grading systems, teaching manuals, and outreach to the public school system. This model influenced subsequent developments in karate and aikidō schools in Japan, as well as dojangs in Korea during the mid-20th century when taekwondo was systematized.

Accounts such as Gichin Funakoshi's memoir Karate-dō: My Way of Life describe the transition from informal apprenticeship to modern school-based pedagogy.

By the mid-20th century, martial arts schools spread beyond Asia. Returning soldiers, immigrant communities, and public demonstrations contributed to the establishment of karate, judo, and taekwondo schools in Europe and North America, often based in YMCA centers, universities, and commercial storefronts.

In Latin America, distinctive regional institutions developed: the Gracie family academies in Brazil formalized Brazilian jiu-jitsu pedagogy during the 20th century, while capoeira shifted from informal street rodas to structured academias that combined combat with music and cultural instruction.

Scholars note that by the early 21st century martial arts schools had become globalized institutions. Bowman (2021) emphasizes their replication across cultural contexts, while Cynarski (2013) discusses the rise of standardized curricula and international federations. Industry statistics indicate that the United States hosts over 40,000 martial arts schools, generating more than US $19 billion annually.

== Legal and institutional recognition ==
In the United States, the Internal Revenue Service ruled in 1978 that karate schools could qualify as educational organizations for tax-exemption, provided they maintain structured curricula comparable to traditional schools.

Internationally, martial arts schools have also been acknowledged within cultural heritage frameworks. UNESCO has inscribed:

- Taekkyeon of Korea (2011), transmitted through dojangs;
- Pencak Silat of Indonesia (2019), taught through perguruan (training schools);
- Bokator (Kun Lbokator) of Cambodia (2022), practiced in organized schools and promoted as national heritage.

In many countries, martial arts schools operate under the oversight of national sport federations or ministries of culture and education.

== Pedagogy and culture ==
Martial arts schools commonly employ structured curricula with rank systems, most often signaled by belts or sashes. Rank examinations often carry ceremonial significance, reinforcing hierarchy and etiquette within the school community.

Instruction usually includes fundamentals, formal patterns (kata, poomsae, taolu), partner drills, sparring, and physical conditioning. Many schools also incorporate ethical codes or elements of philosophical study alongside physical practice.

Cultural transmission is expressed through uniforms, terminology, and rituals that link practice to historical and cultural origins. Scholars note that martial arts schools function as communities that cultivate discipline, psychosocial development, and social bonds, rather than serving solely as sites of technical instruction.

== Academic study ==
In the field of martial arts studies, schools are examined as institutions of pedagogy, cultural transmission, and identity formation. Paul Bowman characterizes them as forms of "kinetic philosophy," emphasizing their role in embodying ideas through practice, while Sixt Wetzler situates them within the German tradition of Kulturwissenschaft.

Scholars distinguish martial arts schools from athletic clubs, describing them as educational organizations with distinct pedagogical aims. Comparative ethnographies highlight how schools cultivate a martial habitus—core dispositions and embodied practices—through daily training. Other studies analyze embodiment, gender, and identity, showing how schools both reproduce and contest broader social norms.

== Modern adaptations ==
From the late 20th century, martial arts schools shifted toward commercial models, with memberships, franchising, and diversification through tournaments or after-school programs.

Recent research has analyzed how student preferences shape school competitiveness, highlighting factors such as instructor reputation, training environment, and program variety—illustrating how consumer choice influences the adaptation of martial arts schools. Scholars also describe globalization and sportification as drivers of institutional change, with Asian martial arts restructured to fit new international markets.

The global rise of mixed martial arts fostered cross-training curricula, with ethnographers documenting how MMA gyms develop distinctive pedagogical practices and identity-forming environments that differ from older martial arts schools.

Many schools have also intersected with the broader fitness and wellness industry, offering activities such as cardio kickboxing, yoga, or strength training alongside traditional martial arts instruction.

== Contemporary issues ==
Scholars debate ongoing tensions around commercialization, authenticity, and health practices in martial arts schools.

A common critique in martial arts discourse concerns the phenomenon of enrollment-driven commercialization, where schools—particularly within karate and taekwondo—are perceived to prioritize maximizing student enrollment and rapid promotion over the quality and depth of instruction. Nonetheless, some commentators argue that such commercial approaches can enhance accessibility and broaden opportunities for martial arts training.

Some analyses in sport management literature argue argue that modern marketing strategies have reshaped martial arts culture itself, blending traditional practice with consumer-driven approaches. Recent research further suggests that these market pressures stem from student demand, with preferences for instructor reputation, program diversity, and facilities pushing schools toward more competitive—sometimes controversial—business practices.

Broader analyses also highlight how globalization and market expansion reshape what counts as "authentic" practice, often creating tensions between local tradition and international sportification.

Martial arts schools have additionally been studied for their therapeutic applications, such as karate programs for children with autism and taekwondo for fall prevention in older adults.

Questions of gender and inclusion remain central concerns in martial arts discourse. Women-only schools and self-defense programs have been examined as initiatives to challenge traditional gender roles; however, structural barriers continue to persist.

== Works cited ==
- Alter, Joseph S. (1992). The Wrestler's Body: Identity and Ideology in North India. University of California Press. doi:10.1525/california/9780520076976.001.0001. ISBN 978-0-520-07307-4. OCLC 246336362.
- Bennett, Alexander (2005). Budo Perspectives. Kendo World Publications. ISBN 978-4-9901694-3-5. OCLC 66467863.
- Bennett, Alexander (2015). Kendo: Culture of the Sword. University of California Press. ISBN 978-0-520-28437-1. OCLC 899209273.
- Bowman, Paul (2015). Martial Arts Studies: Disrupting Disciplinary Boundaries. Rowman & Littlefield International. ISBN 978-1-78348-128-6. OCLC 898087486.
- Bowman, Paul (2017). "Martial Arts Studies: Disrupting Disciplinary Boundaries". Martial Arts Studies. 1: 1–20. doi:10.18573/j.2017.10092.
- Bowman, Paul (2021). The Invention of Martial Arts: Popular Culture Between Asia and America. Oxford University Press. doi:10.1093/oso/9780197540336.001.0001. ISBN 978-0-19-754034-3. OCLC 1240268130.
- Brown, David; Jennings, George (2011). "In Search of a Martial Habitus: Identifying Core Dispositions in Wing Chun and Taijiquan". In Sánchez García, Raúl; Spencer, Dale C. (eds.). Fighting Scholars: Habitus and Ethnographies of Martial Arts and Combat Sports. Anthem Press. pp. 33–48. doi:10.2307/j.ctt1gxpddq.7. ISBN 978-0-85728-407-5.
- Capener, Steven D. (1995). "Problems in the Identity and Philosophy of T'aekwŏndo and Their Historical Causes". Korea Journal. 35 (4). Seoul: Korean National Commission for UNESCO: 52–81. ISSN 0023-3900.
- Channon, Alex; Jennings, George (2014). "Exploring Embodiment Through Martial Arts and Combat Sports: A Review of Empirical Research". Sport in Society. 17 (6): 773–789. doi:10.1080/17430437.2014.882906. ISSN 1743-0437.
- Cook, Harry (2009). Shotokan Karate: A Precise History. Focus Publications. ISBN 978-0-9555122-0-9. OCLC 373476407.
- Cynarski, Wojciech J. (2013). "General reflections about the philosophy of martial arts". Ido Movement for Culture. Journal of Martial Arts Anthropology. 13 (3): 1–6. doi:10.14589/ido.13.3.1. ISSN 2084-3763.
- Downey, Greg (2007). "Producing Pain: Techniques and Technologies in No-Holds-Barred Fighting". Social Studies of Science. 37 (2): 201–226. doi:10.1177/0306312706072174. ISSN 0306-3127.
- Funakoshi, Gichin (1975) [1935]. Karate-dō: My Way of Life. Kodansha International. ISBN 978-0-87011-463-2. OCLC 1463246.
- Jennings, George (2011). "Skilful Fights and Flowing Play: Situated Learning in Capoeira". In Sánchez García, Raúl; Spencer, Dale C. (eds.). Fighting Scholars: Habitus and Ethnographies of Martial Arts and Combat Sports. Anthem Press. pp. 66–84. ISBN 978-0-85728-407-5.
- Jennings, George (2019). "The light and dark side of martial arts pedagogy: towards a study of unhealthy practices". Qualitative Research in Sport, Exercise and Health. 11 (4): 451–463. doi:10.1080/2159676X.2019.1591853 (inactive 17 August 2025). ISSN 2159-676X.
- Kennedy, Brian; Guo, Elizabeth (2005). Chinese Martial Arts Training Manuals: A Historical Survey. North Atlantic Books. ISBN 978-1-55643-557-7. OCLC 60323233.
- Lorge, Peter A. (2008). Chinese Martial Arts: From Antiquity to the Twenty-First Century. Cambridge University Press. ISBN 978-0-521-87881-4. OCLC 191929143.
- Stenius, Magnus (2015). The Body in Pain and Pleasure: An Ethnography of Mixed Martial Arts. Umeå University. ISBN 978-91-7601-325-0. OCLC 936603417.
- Wetzler, Sixt (2015). "Martial Arts Studies as Kulturwissenschaft: A Possible Theoretical Framework". Martial Arts Studies (1): 21–30. doi:10.18573/j.2015.10018. ISSN 2057-5696.
