= Martial Arts Odyssey =

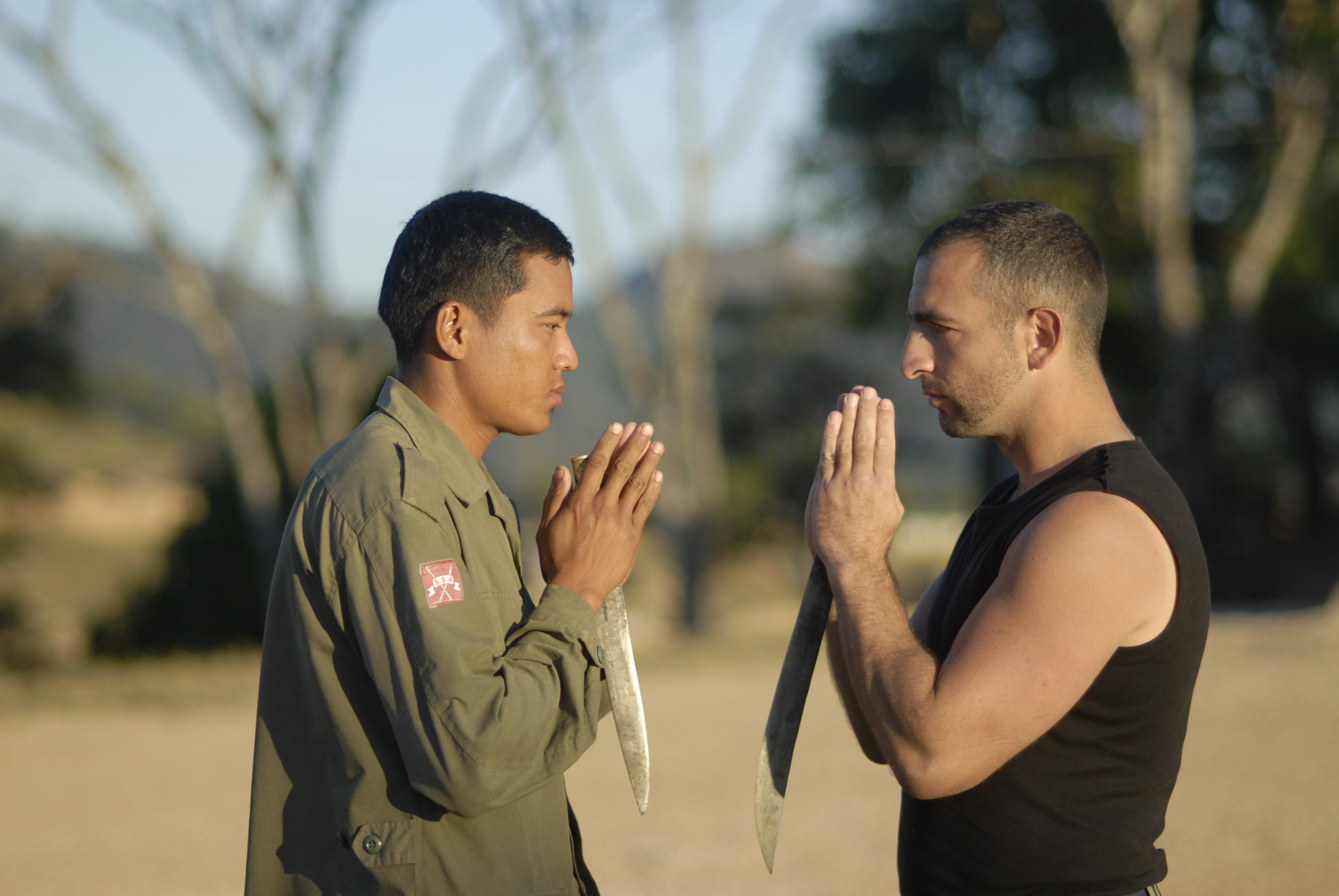
- Writing career
- Genres: Martial arts & Adventure

Martial Arts Odyssey is an American web TV show with a martial arts travel theme. Created and hosted by Antonio Graceffo, the series has run more than 180 episodes shot in Taiwan, Thailand, Vietnam, the Philippines, Malaysia, Laos, Burma, and Cambodia. Martial arts featured on the show include: Muay Thai, Muay Chaiya, Pradal Serey (Khmer boxing), Bokator, Filipino Kuntaw, Mixed Martial Arts (MMA), Kung Fu, Silat Kalam, Silat Melayu, Tomoi, boxing, Muay Lao, Ziyou Bodji, urban combat, Lai Tai, Muay Boran, military hand-to-hand combat, Silambam, and others.

== Format ==
Each episode opens with Antonio standing next to an instructor while delivering his standard greeting: "Hey, I’m Antonio Graceffo. And this is Martial Arts Odyssey. Today we are in (name of the location). And we are learning (name of martial art). With me today is (name of instructor)." Every episode includes training sequences, including some involving Antonio sparring with different martial artists. In addition, the show contains interviews with practitioners of the profiled martial art, as well as details of local culture and history in the area where these arts were founded. Antonio describes himself as a martial arts anthropologist.

In various episodes Antonio can be heard speaking with his guests in a number of languages, such as Thai, Chinese, Vietnamese, Khmer, Spanish, German, and Italian. In total, Antonio speaks nine languages.

The show is produced on a low budget and is shot with a single video camera and edited on free software. The show has no sponsors.

== Unique aspects ==
Martial Arts Odyssey seems to be the first, if not the only martial arts-related reality travel show which appears on YouTube and which is privately funded, without the support of commercial sponsors. It has run more episodes than any other martial arts documentary series. Episodes have been shot in countries and features arts not featured on major networks, such as Muay Lao, Lai Tai, and Silat Kalam.

The show has been credited with having revived a number of lost and nearly lost martial arts, including Bokator, Lai Tai, Silat Kalam and Kuntaw.

== Reception ==
The first episode was shot in Manila, in the Philippines, in 2007. While Martial Arts Odyssey appears primarily on YouTube, episodes have been rented to various other media outlets. Raw footage has also been loaned to other producers and has appeared in more professional shows. The show has had over one million views on YouTube as of 2012.
