= San Kim Sean =

Cambodian martial artist and promoter of Bokator (1945–2025)

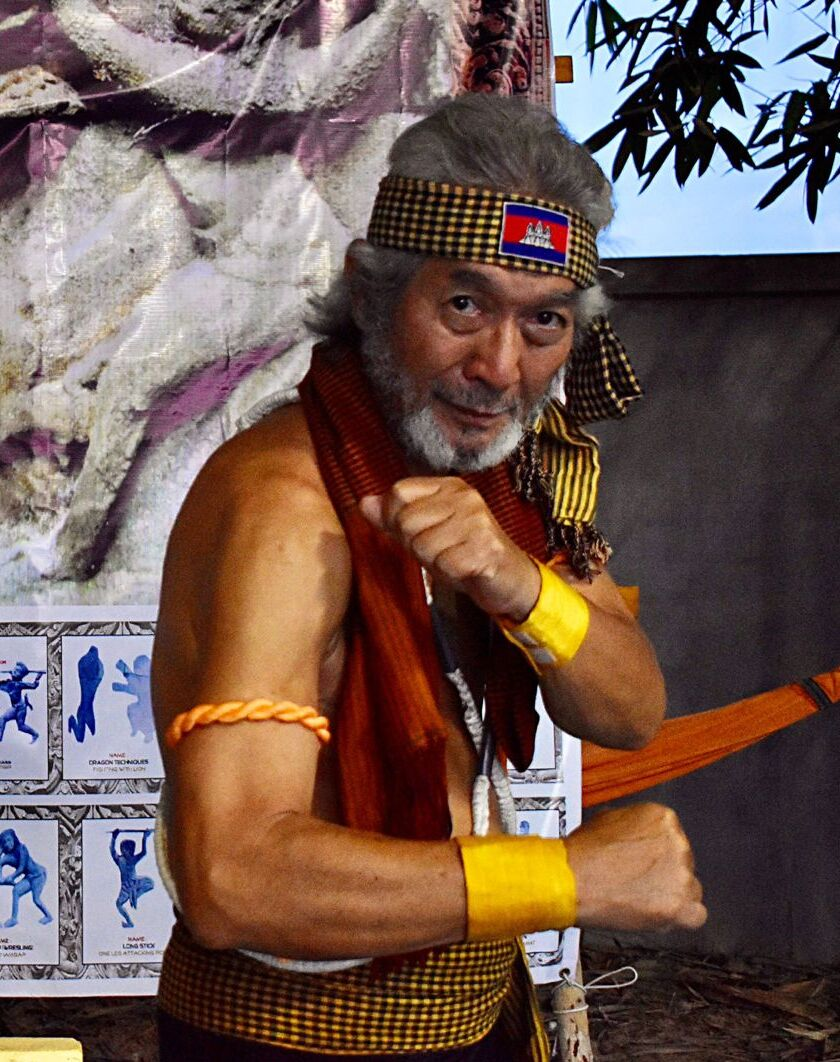
- Born: March 24, 1945; Kingdom of Kampuchea
- Died: June 3, 2025 (aged 80); Phnom Penh, Cambodia
- Native name: សាន គឹមស៊ាន
- Style: Bokator
- Teacher(s): Khim Leak
- Rank: Golden Krama in Bokator (Grandmaster)

San Kim Sean (Khmer: សាន គឹមស៊ាន; March 24, 1945 – June 3, 2025) was a Cambodian martial art teacher. He is often referred to as the father of modern Bokator and is largely credited with reviving the art. At age 13, he studied Bokator under Master Khim Leak at Wat Mohamandrey. San Kim Sean also studied boxing under Master Chai Chheng in 1959 and 1960. He studied Judo under Kru So Meng Hong. and Hapkido under Korean master Chhay Yong Ho. San Kim Sean was the founder of the Cambodia Bokator Federation and the Cambodia Bokator Academy.

== Career ==
At the time of the Pol Pot regime (1975–1979) those who practiced traditional arts were either systematically exterminated by the Khmer Rouge, fled as refugees or stopped teaching. After the Khmer Rouge regime, the Vietnamese occupation of Cambodia began and native martial arts were completely outlawed. After the Pol Pot era, San Kim Sean had to flee Cambodia to the United States under accusations by the Vietnamese of teaching martial arts.

Once in America, San Kim Sean started teaching Hapkido at a local YMCA in Houston, Texas and later moved to Long Beach, California. After living in the United States and teaching and promoting Hapkido, he left the United States in 1992 and decided to return to Cambodia to revive Bokator.

In 2001, San Kim Sean settled in Phnom Penh and after getting permission from the new King Norodom Sihanouk to begin teaching Bokator to the local youth, that same year, in the hopes of bringing all of the remaining living masters together, San Kim Sean began traveling the country seeking out Bokator lok kru (instructors) who had survived the Khmer Rouge regime. The few masters San Kim Sean found were old, ranging from sixty to ninety years of age; many were afraid to teach the art of Bokator openly. After much persuasion and with government approval, San Kim Sean effectively reintroduced Bokator to the Cambodian people.

== Death ==
San Kim Sean died in Phnom Penh on June 3, 2025, at the age of 80, after suffering a heart attack. His death was confirmed by **Vath Chamroeun**, secretary-general of the National Olympic Committee of Cambodia, who described him as a "living treasure" for his pivotal role in reviving Kun Lbokator and securing its recognition by UNESCO.
