= Lakhon Bassac =

Lakhon Bassac (ល្ខោនបាសាក់, Lkhaon Basăk; Khmer pronunciation: [lkʰaon baː.sak]) is a popular theatre form of Cambodia, created by Khmer people near the Bassac River in southern Vietnam at the beginning of the 20th century. It is derived from Chinese opera which explains some of the costumes, modified face painting, musical instrumentations (drums, gongs, chimes, and wood blocks), singing dialogues, acrobatics and fighting. Musically it appears similar to pinpeat versions of Vietnamese cải lương. Dances in Lakhon Bassac are often popularized versions of Lakhon Kbach Boran (Khmer: ល្ខោនក្បាច់បូរាណ), a classical court performance. Repertoires come from Jataka tales and local legends, and sometimes by localizing dramas from China, Vietnam, and France, "such as altering the villains in Vietnamese hát bội from Chinese to Vietnamese!"

Before the Democratic Kampuchea era, professional troupes performed in Phnom Penh, Battambang, Siem Reap and other cities, while amateurs staged shows at religious festivals. Unlike many other forms of traditional arts, it was not destroyed under the Khmer Rouge, but rather co-opted for propaganda purposes.
