= Kbach Kun Dambong Veng =

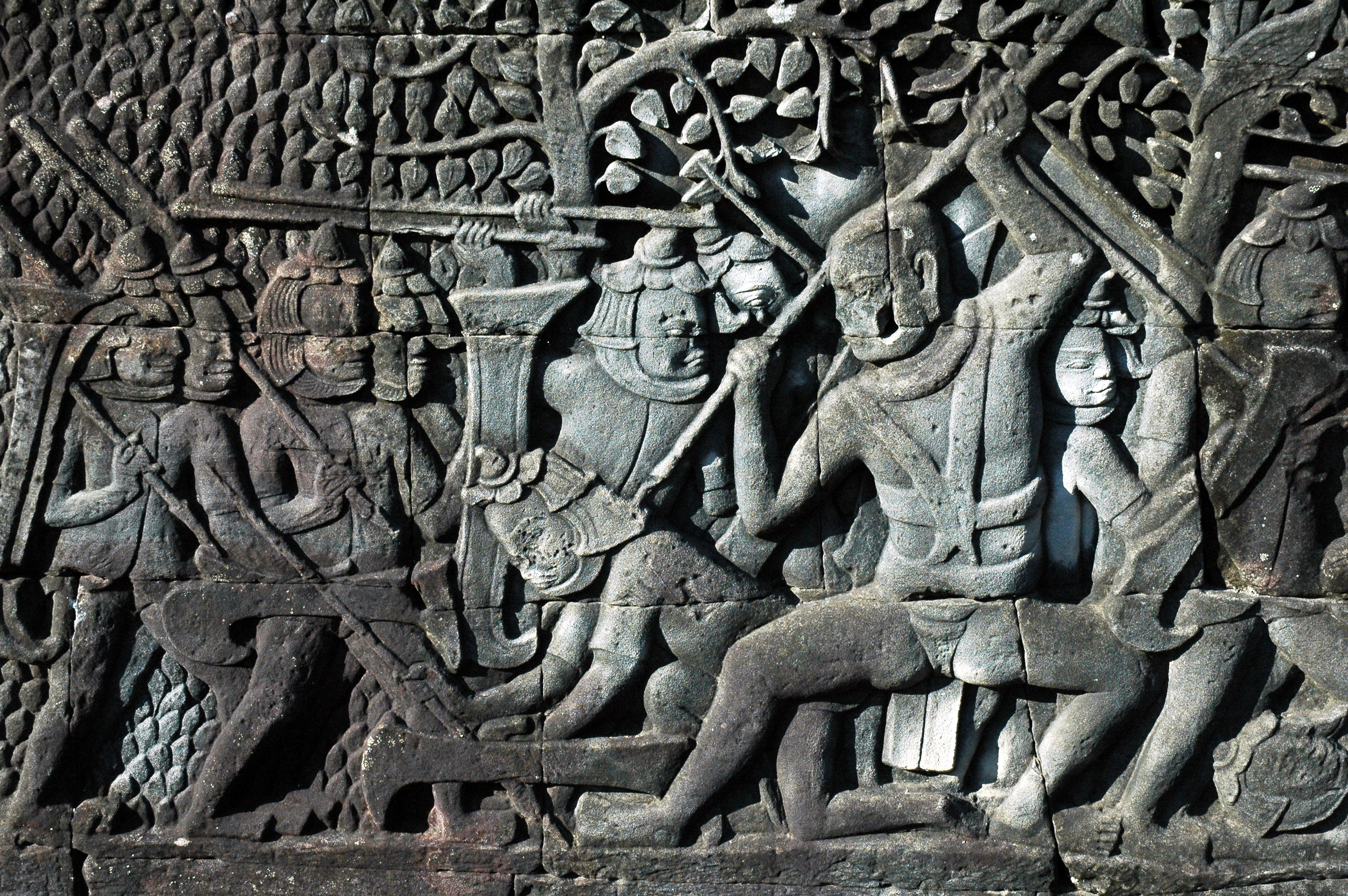
- Long staff strikes at Bayon temple (12th century)
- Focus: Weaponry
- Country of origin: Cambodia
- Olympic sport: No

Kbach Kun Dambong Veng (Khmer: ក្បាច់គុណដំបងវែង, lit. 'Martial Art of the Long Staff') is a sub-discipline of Bokator. It involves the use of long staffs. In Cambodia, the discipline has historically been used to protect the country and villages from potential enemies.

== See also ==
- Bojutsu
- Eskrima
- Krabi Krabong
- Silambam
