= Thaiachira =

Martial arts group in Thailand

ThaiAchira
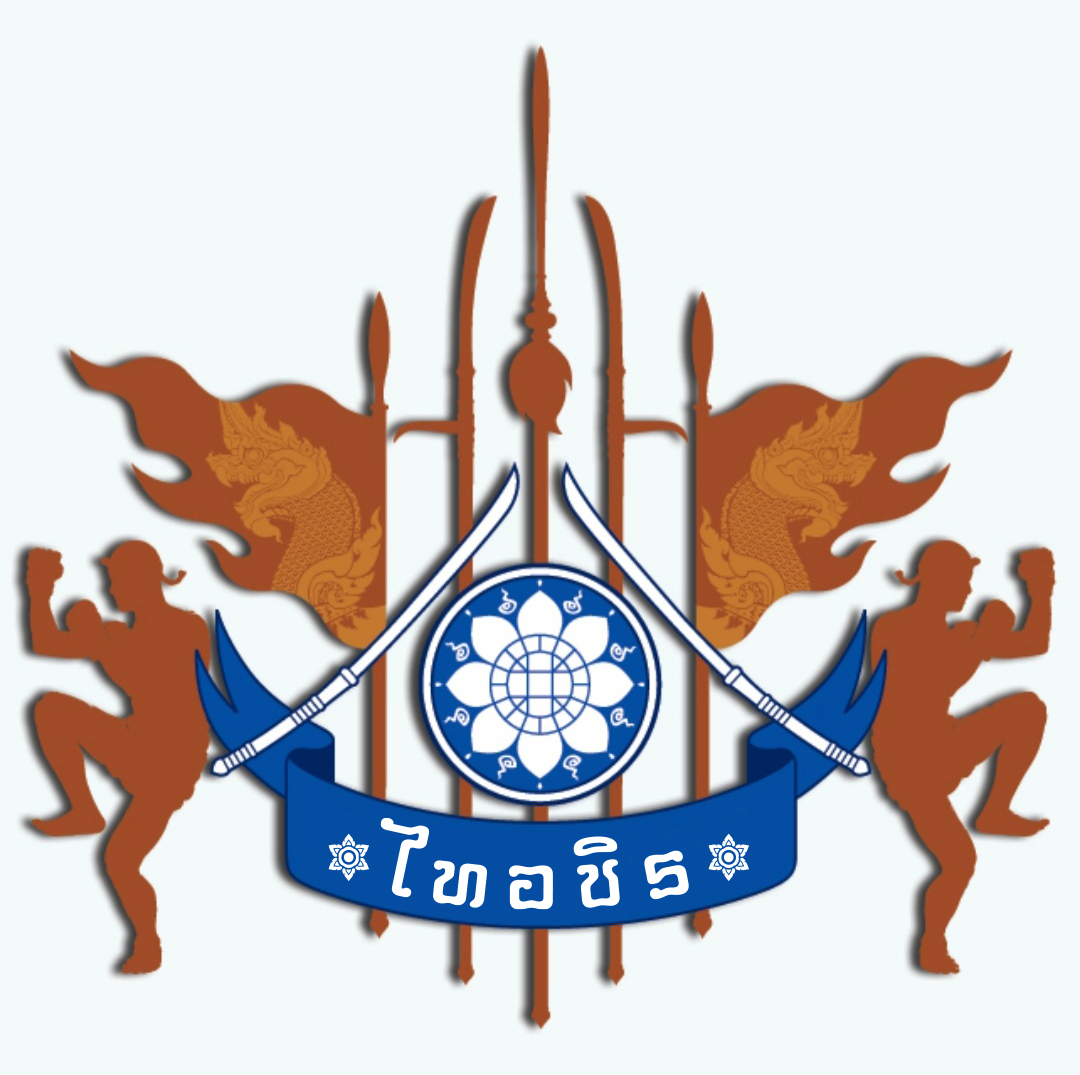
- Date founded: August 1, 2010
- Country of origin: Thailand
- Founder: Lamp Sakkapoom
- Arts taught: Muay Chaiya, Daab Chao Ram
- Ancestor schools: Chaiyarat

ThaiAchira - Krabi Krabong Muay Boran, is a group of Muay Chaiya and Krabi Krabong enthusiasts, that was created on August 1, 2010, by Lamp Sakkapoom and his acquaintance. The group was created to teach and promote Muay Chaiya (a branch of Muay Boran from the southern province of Thailand) and Daab Chao Ram (a system of Krabi Krabong developed by Ramkhamhaeng University Thai Weaponry Club) and to participate in charity and volunteer work for neglected youth in rural areas of Thailand. Lamp Sakkapoom holds the position of president of ThaiAchira.

Lamp Sakkapoom, commonly known as “Kru Lamp,” is a practitioner of Muay Boran in the style of Muay Chaiya and Krabi Krabong in the system of Daab Chao Ram. He was a former student of the famed Muay Chaiya fighter and instructor “Thonglor Yalae.” and a co-author of the book "Muay Chaiya Manuscript". Lamp Sakkapoom participated in many martial arts scenes in Thailand.

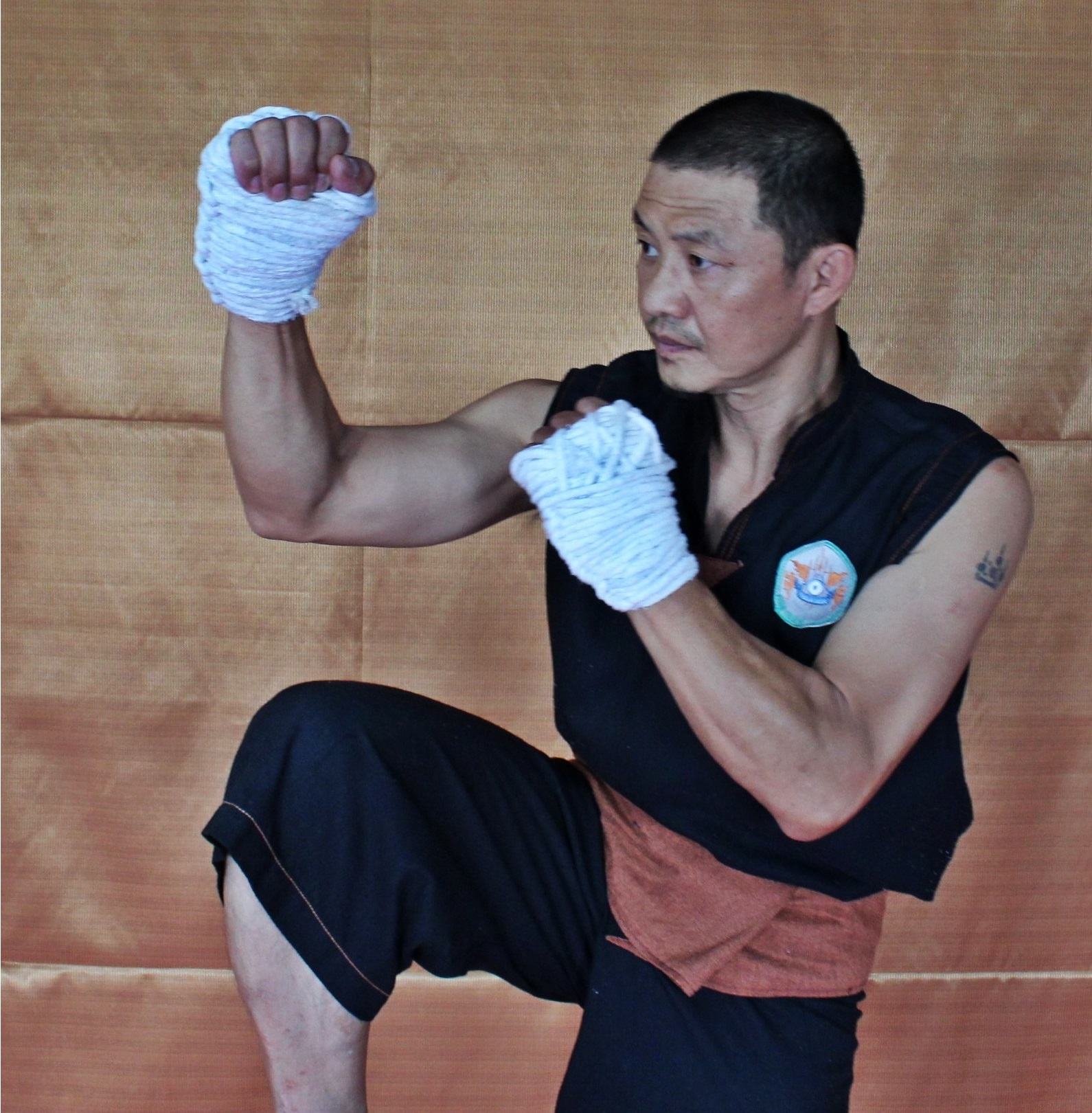
Lamp Sakkapoom

== Teaching and promoting of Muay Chaiya and Daab Chao Ram ==
Muay Chaiya practitioners of ThaiAchira are known in the martial arts scene in Thailand for incorporating traditional dances as a form of practice and strategy, as well as for their destructive throwing of knee and elbow strikes. Similarly, Daab Chao Ram practitioners of ThaiAchira emphasize explosive footwork (derived from the Muay Chaiya stance “Suea Lak Hang”) and heavy strikes.

Over the years, ThaiAchira has taught students from all over the world. Further, ThaiAchira has also held numerous Muay Chaiya and Daab Chao Ram seminars in many countries around the world, such as the United States, Germany, Russia, and Austria to name a few.

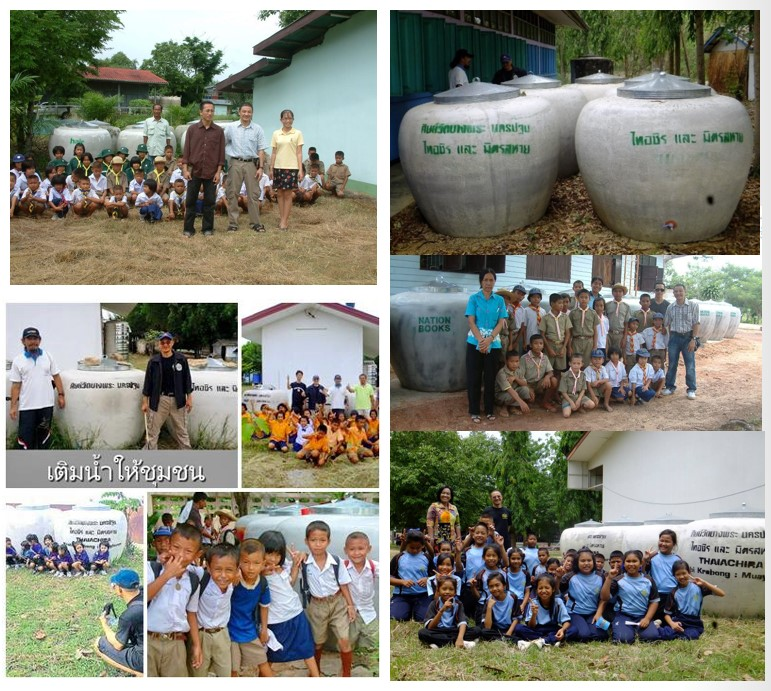
ThaiAchira donation and charity work in rural area across Thailand

=== Notable student ===
- Ralf Kussler, a teacher and practitioner of Muay Boran and Krabi Krabong, currently holds the position of president of ThaiAchira Group Germany.

== Charity and volunteer works ==
- Donated alms such as books, stationery, learning equipment, clothes, blankets, and mosquito nets.
- Donated and helped install water tanks in communities, temples, and schools where access to clean drinking water is scarce.
- Volunteered to use Muay Chaiya (a branch of Muay Boran) and Daab Chao Ram (a system of Krabi Krabong) as an exercise intervention to keep children from all walks of life away from drugs and to promote physical and mental health.
- Participated in promoting Muay Chaiya as a national and local heritage of Chaiya district, Surat Thani with the goal to generate income for local residents all the while promoting sustainable Thai and international cultural tourism.
