= Thonglor Yalae =

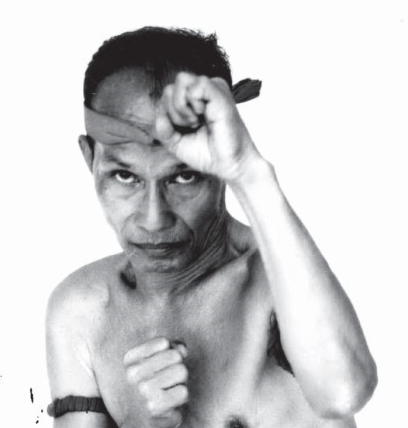
- Born: August 1, 1929; Bangkok, Thailand
- Died: September 19, 1996 (aged 67)
- Nationality: Thai
- Style: Muay Chaiya, Krabi Krabong
- Teachers: Khetr Sriyabhai, Sunthorn Thaweesith

Other information
- Notable students: Lamp Sakkapoom

Thonglor Yalae, also commonly known as Khru Thong or Thong Chuea Chaiya, was born on August 1, 1929, at Siriraj Hospital in Bangkok. He was a Muay Chaiya grandmaster who resided in Bangkok and is regarded as one of the most influential figures who popularized Muay Chaiya in the 20th century. He studied Muay Chaiya under Khetr Sriyabhai and Sunthorn Thaweesith (also known as Arjan Kimseng), both of whom were renowned Muay Chaiya masters.

== Biography ==
Thonglor Yalae began training in boxing when he was in sixth grade. Around the age of 13 or 14, he sought out Muay Thai schools that could meet his aspirations but was unable to find one that satisfied him. As a result, he decided to study Muay Thai with his mother’s relative, Pa Lam, under Khru Chantr Samitvej and Khru Chai Sithipol.

When Thonglor was about 16 years old, he began working at Makkasan Railway Station. After numerous discussion about Muay Thai with his colleagues at work, one of them eventually decided to introduced him to Khetr Sriyabhai, a master of Muay Chaiya, a style of Muay Boran from the southern province of Thailand. From that point on, Thonglor would train under Khetr Sriyabhai and participated in many tournaments until he retired at the age of 24, heeding his grandmother’s plea to stop fighting.

Thonglor continued training under Khetr Sriyabhai for several years. Eventually, Khetr felt there was nothing more he could teach him and introduced him to Sunthorn Thaweesith (Arjan Kimseng), who had been Khetr’s teacher. Sunthorn trained Thonglor for about three years before he died on 22 July 1961.

== Muay Chaiya Legacy ==
Thonglor Yalae established his first Muay Chaiya school at his home at Baan Thab Chang. Initially named “Srisakul,” the school was later renamed “Singha Thongkham” and ultimately “Chaiyarat,” as suggested by his master, Khetr Sriyabhai.

In 1983, during a Muay Chaiya workshop organized by Thonglor at Bangkok Bank Public Company Limited (Phan Fah branch), he met students from the Thai Weaponry Club at Ramkhamhaeng University. These students invited him to teach Muay Chaiya. At first, Thonglor taught them at the Chaiyarat boxing school at his home, but eventually, he began teaching directly at Ramkhamhaeng University.

The following year, Thonglor was invited by Chupong Panjamawat, a student from Chulalongkorn University and the president of the Chulalongkorn Thai Weaponry Club, to teach Muay Boran in the Chaiya lineage. Today, the Chulalongkorn Thai Weaponry Club operates as the Chula-Chaiyarat Sword School. Beyond Ramkhamhaeng and Chulalongkorn, Thonglor was also invited to teach Muay Chaiya at other institutions, including Siam University and Technology Bangkapi School. He continued teaching at various universities until 1994, when he had to stop due to emphysema. Thonglor Yalae died on September 19, 1996, from lung cancer.

== Chaiyarat ==
Thonglor Yalae taught Muay Chaiya at his home in Baan Thab Chang, Bangkok, Thailand. The school was named “Chaiyarat” by his master, Khetr Sriyabhai. Thonglor ran the school until 1991 when the construction of Motorway 7 cut through the property.

Today, on the land where Thonglor’s original school once stood, Baan Chaiyarat - Muay Chaiya Daab Chao Ram was re-established in 2023 to honor his legacy. The new school was founded by Ying Yalae, Thonglor’s daughter, and Lamp Sakkapoom Thonglor's former student and founder of ThaiAchira.
