= Daab Chao Ram =

System of Krabi Krabong

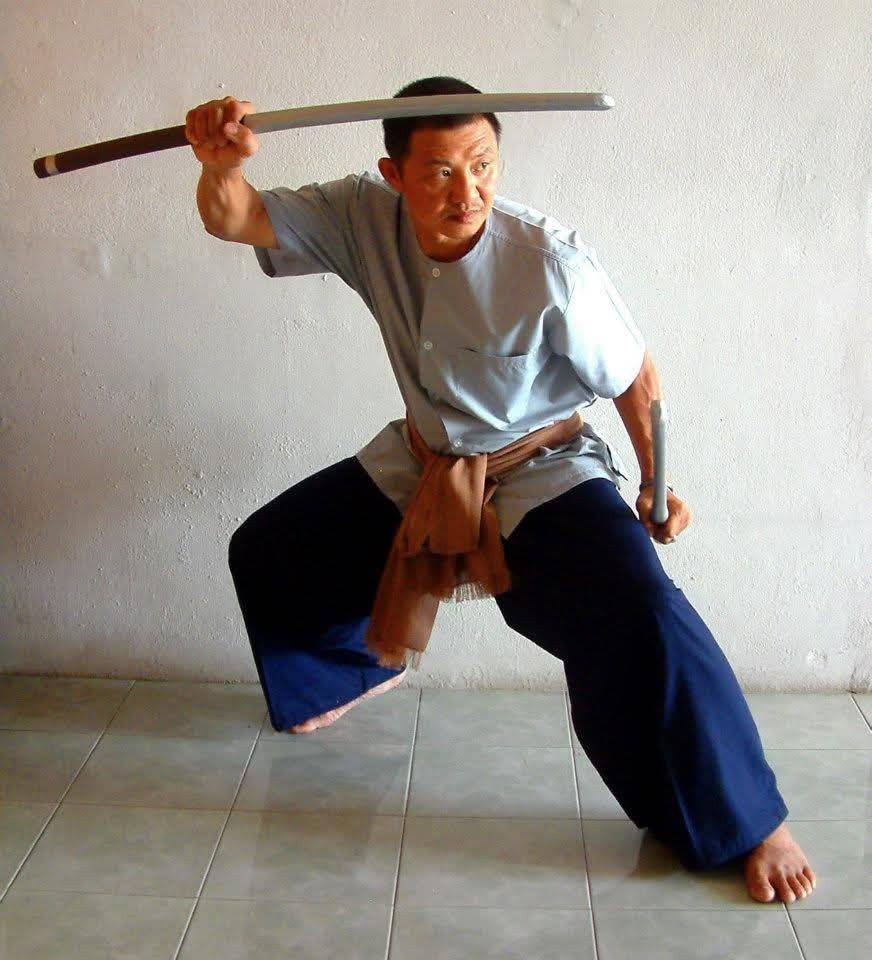
- Lamp Sakkapoom in Daab Chao Ram Stance
- Also known as: Daab Ram
- Focus: Dynamic footwork, Hard strikes
- Country of origin: Thailand
- Famous practitioners: Manoj Boonyamad, Lamp Sakkapoom, Nutputpong Kanthasen, Tosapon Surawasri, Nophaphop Pramuan, Ralf Kussler
- Descendant arts: Daab Kam Fah, Tactical Thai Sword

Daab Chao Ram or Daab Jao Ram (ดาบเจ้าราม) is a system of Krabi Krabong that was created and developed by members of Ramkhamhaeng University Thai Weaponry Club. The club was founded in 1971 and it attracted students with knowledge and interest in ancient Thai weaponry and martial artists from all across Thailand.

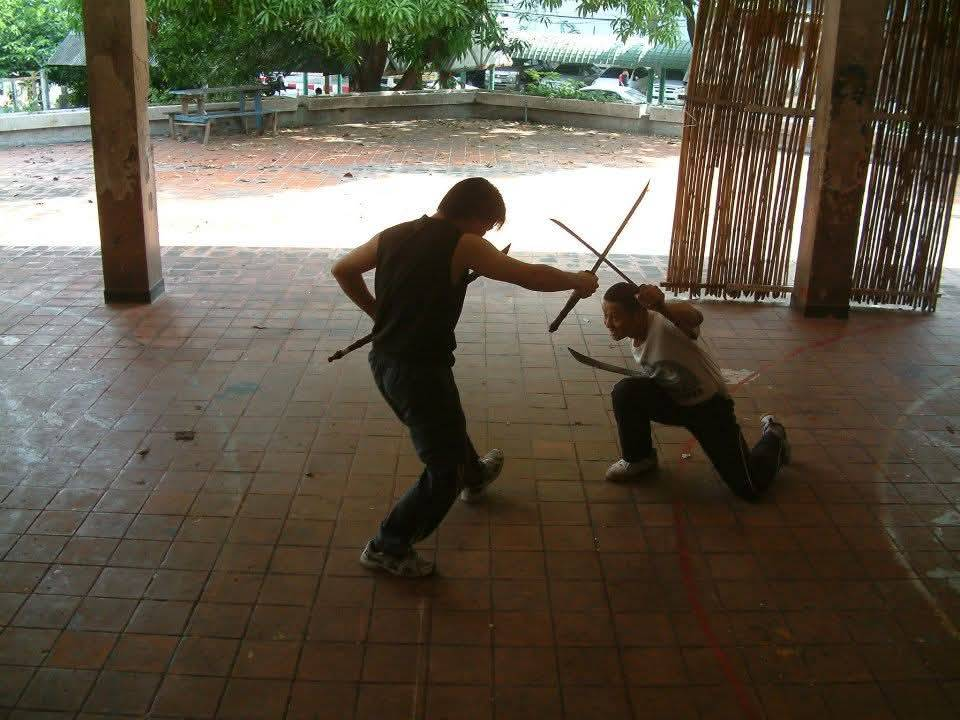
Ramkhamhaeng university AD1 Building

Thonglor Yalae, the famed Muay Chaiya fighter and instructor took part in teaching Muay Chaiya and Krabi Krabong at the club further strengthening the foundation of Daab Chao Ram. Thonglor Yalae would teach at the club from roughly 1983 all the way to 1994 where he retired due to health issues. Skills, techniques, and strategies were shared and tested. What worked remains, and what didn't were omitted resulting in a system called "Daab Chao Ram". "Daab" meaning sword and "Chao Ram" meaning lord Ramkhamhaeng.

The original headquarter of the club was at AD1 Building, Ramkhamhaeng University Ramkhamhaeng campus however, the building was demolished in 2015 and the club headquarter was moved to KLB Building of the same campus. Daab Chao Ram is known for its low stance (resembling "Suea Lak Hang" stance from Muay Chaiya) and dynamic footworks and heavy strikes.

== Notable practitioners of Daab Chao Ram ==
- Manoj Boonyamad (Kru Mad), former member of Ramkhamhaeng University Thai Weaponry Club, practitioner and instructor of Daab Chao Ram and Attamat Naresuan. Co-founder of "Attamat Naresuan Sword Fighting School".
- Lamp Sakkapoom (Kru Lamp), former member of Ramkhamhaeng University Thai Weaponry Club, practitioner and instructor of Muay Chaiya and Daab Chao Ram. Founder and president of "ThaiAChira Krabi Krabong Muay Boran" and the co-author of the book "Muay Chaiya Manuscript".
- Nutputpong Kanthasen (Kru Mee), former member of Ramkhamhaeng University Thai Weaponry Club, practitioner and instructor of Daab Chao Ram and Daab Kam Fah. Founder of "Daab Kam Fah Club", a system of Krabi Krabong that is the descendant of Daab Chao Ram and Attamat.
- Tosapon Surawasri (Kru Tod), former member of Ramkhamhaeng University Thai Weaponry Club, a practitioner and instructor of Muay Chaiya and Krabi Krabong, and the founder of "Thai Tactical Sword".
- Nophaphop Pramuan (Kru Praeng), former member of Ramkhamhaeng University Thai Weaponry Club, practitioner and instructor of Muay Chaiya and Krabi Krabong.
- Ralf Kussler, practitioner and instructor of Muay Chaiya and Krabi Krabong. President of "ThaiAchira Group Germany".

== See also ==
- Daab (sword) – Bughti knife
- Krabi–krabong – Weapon-based martial art from Thailand
- Muay Chaiya – Style of traditional Thai boxing
- Muay Boran – Unarmed martial arts of Thailand
