= History of Thai passports =

History of passports issued by Siam and Thailand

Cover of the third-generation Thai passport, first issued in 2020

The history of Thai passports encompasses the development of documents issued by the state of Siam and later Thailand to certify identity and facilitate travel, from handwritten official letters during the reign of King Chulalongkorn to passport booklets, machine-readable passports, and electronic passports. In Rattanakosin Era 111 (1892 CE), royal permission was sought to issue passports to Thai nationals traveling abroad. In 1917, the Siamese government formally required persons traveling outside the kingdom to carry passports.

The form of the Siamese passport developed alongside the increased regulation of international travel after the First World War and efforts to establish international passport standards. Passports changed from handwritten documents to a digital system in 1993, and Thailand began issuing electronic passports to the general public in 2005. The third generation of Thai electronic passports began to be issued in 2020, and a ten-year-validity option became available to adults in 2021.

== Travel documents during the reign of King Chulalongkorn ==
During the reign of King Chulalongkorn, there is evidence that the Ministry of the Interior issued handwritten official letters to Thai nationals travelling between districts, towns, and monthons within the kingdom. These documents stated the duration and purpose of the journey and requested that local officials assist the bearer.

In May Rattanakosin Era 111 (1892), officials of the Ministry of Foreign Affairs proposed a passport format for Thai nationals travelling abroad. Prince Devawongse Varoprakar, the Minister of Foreign Affairs, submitted a royal memorandum requesting permission on 6 May, and royal approval was granted on 11 May of the same year.

== Requirement for travellers leaving the kingdom to carry passports ==
During the First World War, many countries tightened their inspection of documents held by foreign nationals. The Siamese government therefore issued the "Proclamation requiring persons travelling outside the kingdom to carry passports", dated 17 September 1917 and published in the Royal Thai Government Gazette on 23 September of the same year.

The proclamation required persons travelling to distant countries to obtain passports from the Ministry of Foreign Affairs. Those travelling to neighbouring countries sharing a border with Siam were to obtain them from a provincial governor or the high commissioner of a monthon. These provisions made the procedure for issuing passports for travel outside the kingdom more clearly defined.

== International standards and passport booklets ==
After the First World War, the League of Nations convened the Conference on Passports, Customs Formalities and Through Tickets in Paris in 1920. The conference proposed a standard passport in the form of a 32-page hard-covered booklet, using French alongside the national language and containing a photograph and physical description of the holder. A standard passport could be issued either for a single journey or with a validity of two years. The Department of Consular Affairs and a Thai legal study state that the Siamese government sent delegates to the conference and accepted the resolutions relating to passport standards.

The Immigration Act, B.E. 2470 (1927), the first immigration law of Siam, came into force on 11 July 1927. Following the adoption of international standards and the enactment of immigration legislation, Siamese passports increasingly developed into booklet-form documents.

Later passport booklets had hard black or blue covers. The information inside was written by hand in Thai and French, and the booklets included the holder's photograph and signature. They contained 32 pages and were valid for two years, renewable once for a total period not exceeding four years. The passport was valid only for the countries specified in the booklet, although additional countries could subsequently be added. In 1977, the Ministry of Foreign Affairs changed the foreign language used for passport data from French to English.

== Transition to digital systems ==
In 1993, the Ministry of Foreign Affairs introduced a digital passport system. The holder's image was printed directly onto the data page instead of being affixed as a photograph, and the data were arranged on a single page so that they could be read by machine. In 2000, the application system was linked to the population-registration database of the Ministry of the Interior. This allowed information to be verified using the national identification number and reduced passport production time to approximately three working days.

In 2002, the Ministry of Foreign Affairs redesigned the passport booklet and added anti-counterfeiting features, including ultraviolet-visible ink and materials requiring specialised equipment for inspection.

== Electronic passports ==
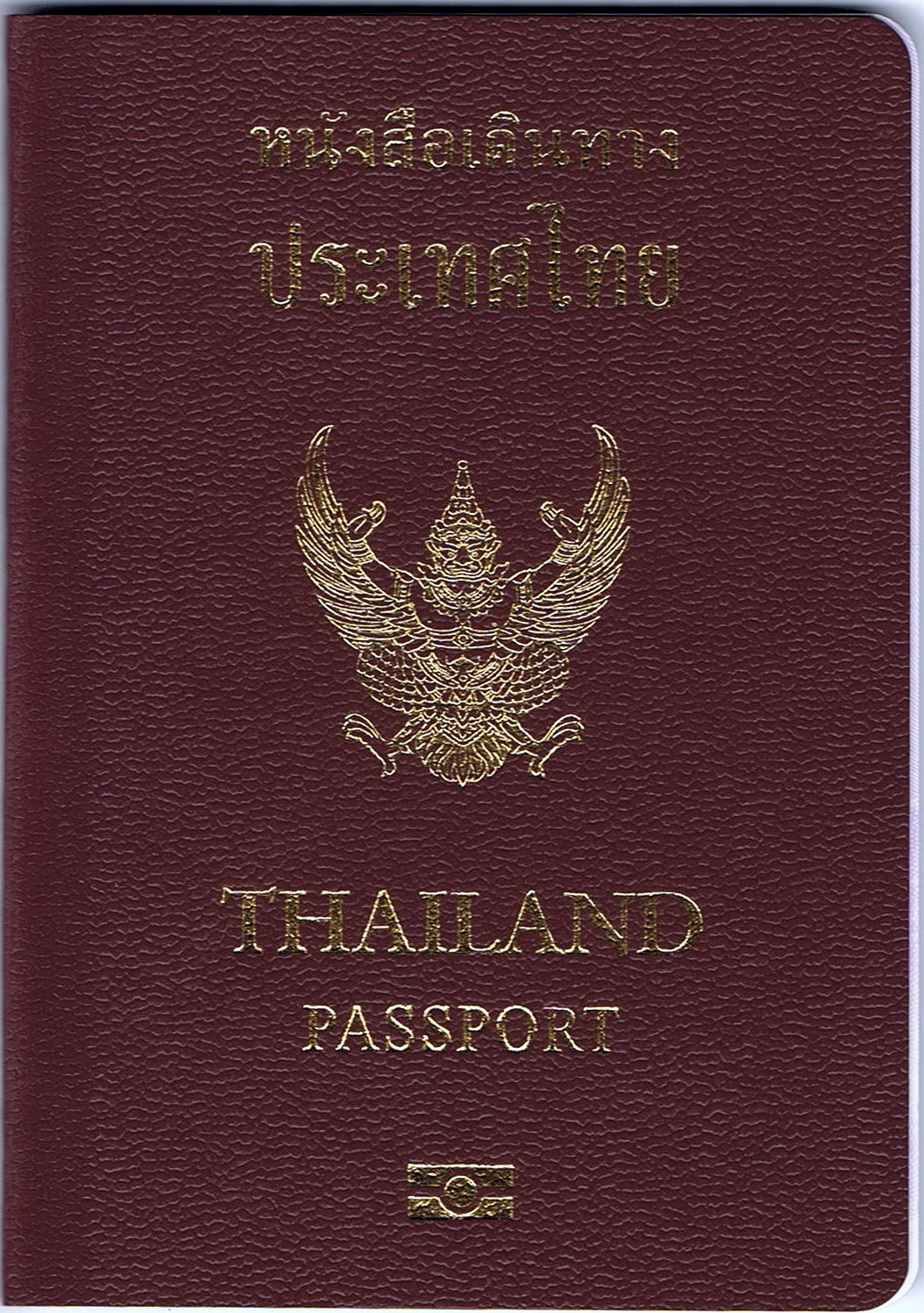
An example of the first-generation Thai biometric passport

Thailand began issuing electronic passports to the general public on 1 June 2005, and launched full electronic-passport services for all passport categories on 1 August of the same year. These passports contain a contactless integrated-circuit chip storing document and biometric data in accordance with the standards of the International Civil Aviation Organization. According to the Department of Consular Affairs, the first generation stored the holder's facial image and fingerprints on the chip.

Electronic passports cannot be renewed or have their personal data amended within the booklet. When a passport expires or the holder's details change, the holder must apply for a new passport. This prevents inconsistencies between the information printed in the booklet and that stored on the chip.

The third generation of ordinary Thai passports began to be issued on 29 June 2020. This generation introduced a redesigned booklet and updated document-security features, and formed the basis of what the Department of Consular Affairs calls "E-Passport 3". Since 2021, adults have been able to choose a ten-year ordinary passport in addition to the five-year version.

== Accessibility for visually impaired people ==
Since 2020, the Department of Consular Affairs has offered, upon request, a transparent Braille sheet affixed to the inside front cover of passports issued to visually impaired people. The sheet gives the passport number, title, English-language given name and surname, date of issue, and date of expiry.

== See also ==
- Thai passport
- Passport
- Biometric passport
- Visa policy
