= Mai sok =

Weapon used in Krabi-Krabong

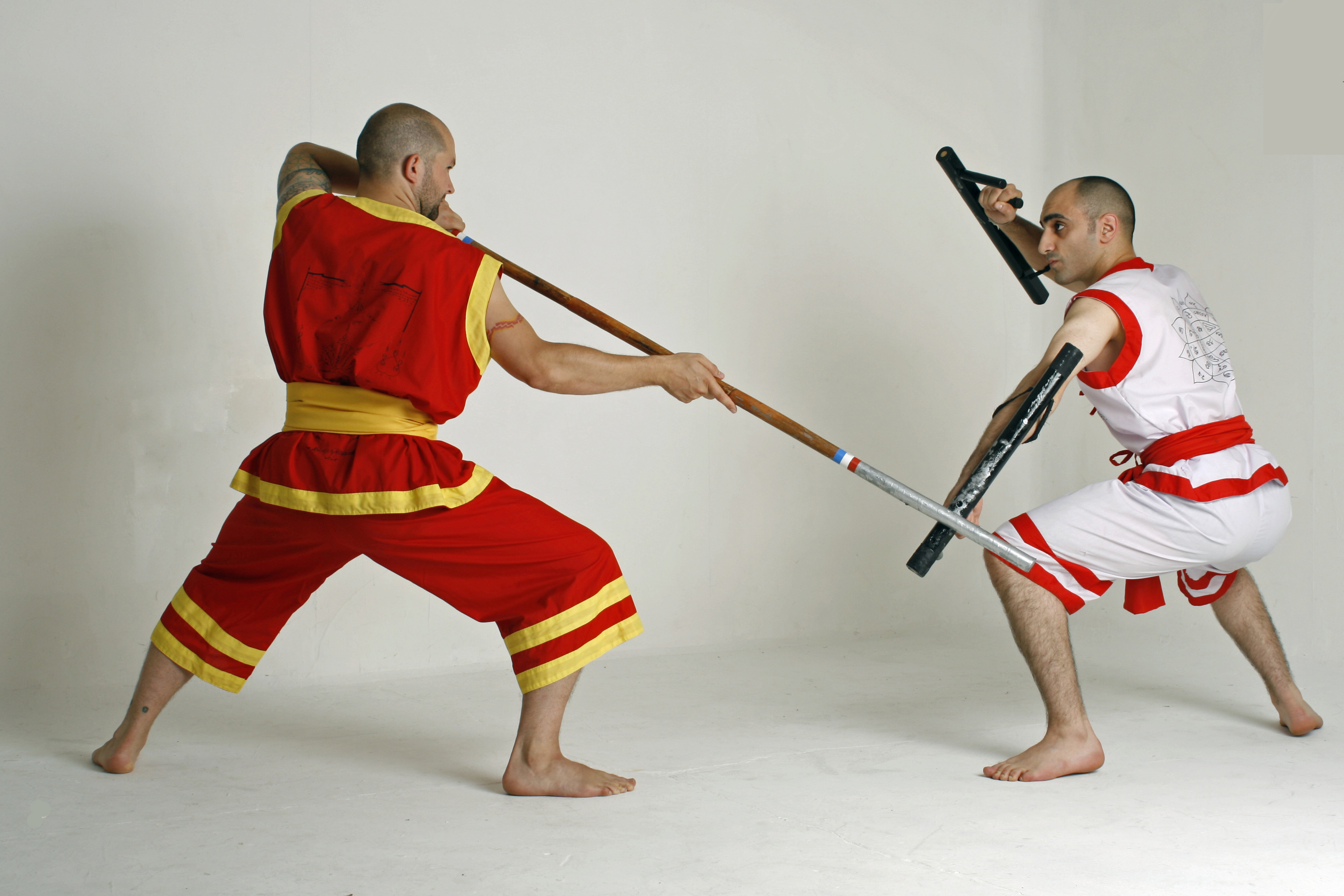
Plong vs. mai sok

The mai sok (Thai: ไม้ศอก, lit. 'elbow stick') is a traditional weapon from the Thai martial art of Krabi-Krabong. It is a forearm shield made of wood, typically used in pairs, that can be used for both offense and defense at close range.

== About ==
The mai sok is also known as the "wooden elbow" as it is worn on the forearm. The mai sok is constructed of a plank of wood, typically between 18 and 21 inches long, and about 3 inches wide so that it can cover the forearm and elbow. There are two pegs that function as handles on one end, made of wood or metal. The inner handle is gripped by the hand and the outer handle is used for protection. The other end uses a rope to affix the mai sok to the wearer's arm. This keeps the mai sok in place but allows for it to be moved about when used with a different grip, for example when clubbing, without dropping it.

== History ==
Like many martial arts, the mai sok originated from the tools of the peasant class: it is believed to have been utilized in farming or fishing and was later weaponized.

== Use ==
The mai sok is a short-range weapon that is used both offensively and defensively and, like all other weapons in Krabi-Krabong, ambidextrously. Most of the offensive and defensive maneuvers with the mai sok mirror the actions in muay thai or muay boran. The main attacks are:

- Elbow
- Punch
- Smash
- Club
- Hook

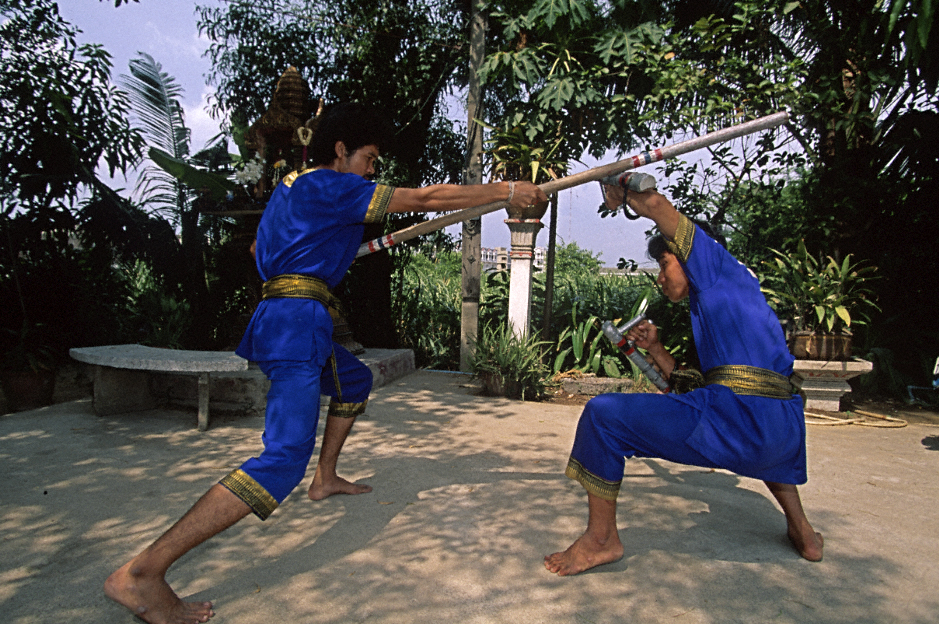
Plong vs. mai sok, defender in a squat

The last two attacks use a grip that requires the wielder to let go of the hand grip and throw the mai sok forward and catch it towards the bottom end. There are also a variety of blocks available, including outer and cross blocks.

== Use in dance ==
Each weapon has its own dance, which starts with the wai khru, to pay respect to your teacher. Next, the dance moves on to the four directions, which could be seated or standing. Last, is the ram, which is a dance specific to the weapon. The mai sok dance starts with the two clubs on the ground with the handle-end forward, pointed together to form a triangle. The participant kneels within the triangle and performs the wai khru. The mai sok are then put on the performer's forearms, and the four directions dance proceeds from there.

== Alternate spellings and names ==
The following variations are used to refer to the mai sok:

- Mai sowk
- Mai sok
- Mai sawk
- Mai sook
- Mai sannt
- Maisun
- Grarock

== In other cultures ==
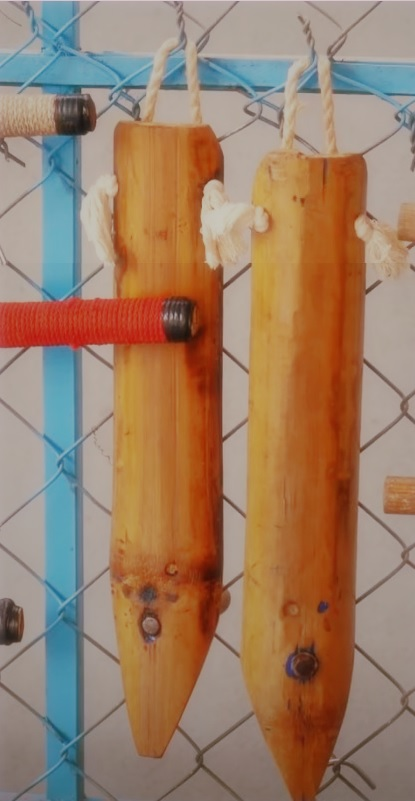
Cambodian staupe used in Bokator, note the pointed tips

In Cambodian Bokator, mai sok (known as staupe) have pointed tips.

The mai sok is similar to and may be related to the tonfa. However, it has two handles instead of one on the tonfa. The tonfa is also not attached to the forearm, so it can be swung out freely for stick-like use while gripping the handle; the mai sok would instead be thrown forward and caught at the end to be used like a club.

== In popular culture ==
In the movie Ong-Bak, in the cave fighting scene, Tony Jaa's character uses mai soks to fight the last opponent before the final boss fight scene.

== See also ==
- "Buddhai Sawan Association of North America – Thai Combat Arts".
- "Chiang Mai Sangha Muay Thai - Train in Thailand". Sangha Muay Thai.
- "Sitsiam Camp-Home of the Thai Martial Ars Sitsiam Camp Home of the Thai Martial Arts". Sitsiam Camp.
- "MAI SAWK - Traditional Shield Fighting – PAHUYUTH". PAHUYUTH. Archived from the original on 2025-03-25.
