= Ngao =

Ngao may refer to:

- Ngao (polearm), a Thai polearm
- Ngao, Kenya
- Ngao District, Lampang Province, Thailand
- Ngao River, a river in Northern Thailand, tributary of the Yom River
- Ngao, Thoeng, a village and subdistrict of Thoeng District, Chiang Rai Province, Thailand
- Ngao of Vientiane, Vientiane, took part in Lao rebellion (1826–1828)
