= Rattanakosin (disambiguation) =

Rattanakosin is the period of Thai history since 1782, represented by the Rattanakosin Kingdom.

Rattanakosin may also refer to:

- The city of Bangkok during this period; see History of Bangkok
- Rattanakosin Era, a year-numbering era formerly used in official documents of Siam
- Rattanakosin Island, the historic center of Bangkok
- Rattanakosin style (or Bangkok style), a distinct period in Thai art
