= Lerdrit =

Thai martial arts

- Focus: Striking, reversals throwing technique, choke-holds, grappling holds
- Country of origin: Thailand
- Creator: Arjan Wisit Lerdrit
- Parenthood: Muay Thai; Muay Boran; Grappling
- Olympic sport: No

Lerdrit, Muay Lert Rit or, Leert Rit (มวย Muay: boxing, fighting เลิศ leert: superior, excellent ฤทธิ์ rit: formidable force, colossal power) is the generic name attributed to the set of principles and fighting techniques employed by Siamese warriors for centuries on Southeast Asian battlefields. This form of Muay has been used primarily by the Royal Thai Army's Palace Guard, the Capital's Defense Corps, war elephants’ Defense Units and Special Infantry Corps. Siamese Lert Rit was based on a clever combination of the Nine Natural Weapons (Nawarthawooth), i.e., hands, feet, knees, elbows and head, which were used to attack and defend. It was also based on the four ancestral strategies used by Special Infantry Corps: Tum (throwing to the ground), Tap (crush), Chap (grab), Hak (break the joints). Muay of today is a traditional martial art born from the ancestral precepts of Siamese warriors, adapted to the self-defence needs of modern practitioners, regardless of their physical characteristics and the conditions under which its techniques are applied. However, several Western martial arts practitioners have developed modern adaptations that combine elements of Muay Thai with those of other martial arts which they now market as Muay Boran.

== Technical features ==
Leert Rit fighting strategy places great emphasis on close range striking, executed using hard body parts such as: the heel and outside edge of the hands, the legs (heel, shin bone), the knees, the elbows and the skull. The trainee is trained to hit and quickly take the opponent down, so as to efficiently apply a pin or a finishing move. The vital points of the body are identified from the first training sessions, in order to train students to attack with ease and to swiftly defend the weakest areas of one's anatomy.

Practice emphasizes powerful short range attacks that employ the Nine Natural Weapons; body conditioning is included in every training session and is designed to increase bone density and muscle and tendon strength, making the trainee's body stronger. Thai style grappling (Muay Pram) is the core practice for every Muay student: working out with non-compliant training partners is mandatory in order to learn how to fight at close range. All Muay students are trained to apply holds, strikes, take downs and finishing moves at a very short distance from the opponent. Psycho-physical stress is generated in a controlled environment, so as to reproduce conditions of real-life aggression.

== See also ==
- Krabi Krabong
- Muay Boran
- Muay Thai
- Tomoi
