= Tonfa =

Okinawan kobudō weapon

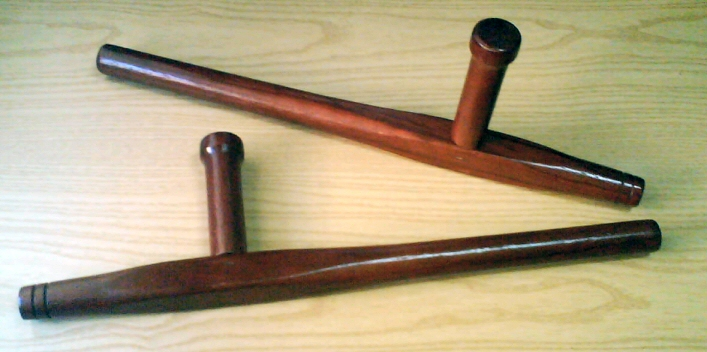
A pair of tonfa

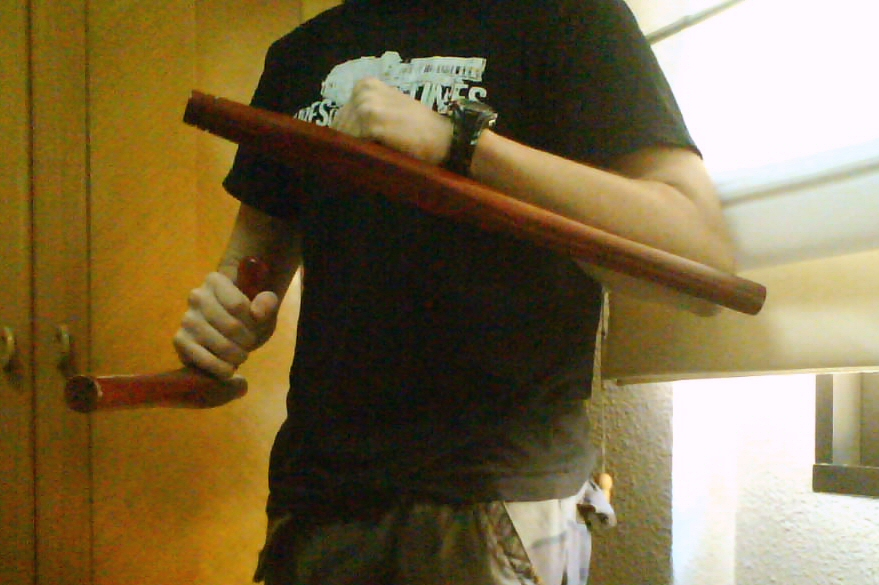
A pair of tonfa with a rounded body throughout.

The tonfa (Okinawan: トンファー tonfā, Japanese: 旋棍; rōmaji: senkon Chinese: 柺; pinyin: guǎi lit. old man's staff / "crutch", also spelled as tongfa or tuifa, also known as T-baton) is a melee weapon with its origins in the armed component of Okinawan martial arts where it is known as the tunkua. It consists of a stick with a perpendicular handle attached a third of the way down the length of the stick, and is about 15–20 inches (380–510 mm) long. It was traditionally made from red or white oak, and wielded in pairs. The tonfa is believed to have originated in either China, Okinawa or Southeast Asia, where it is used in the respective fighting styles.

== History ==
=== Regional variants ===
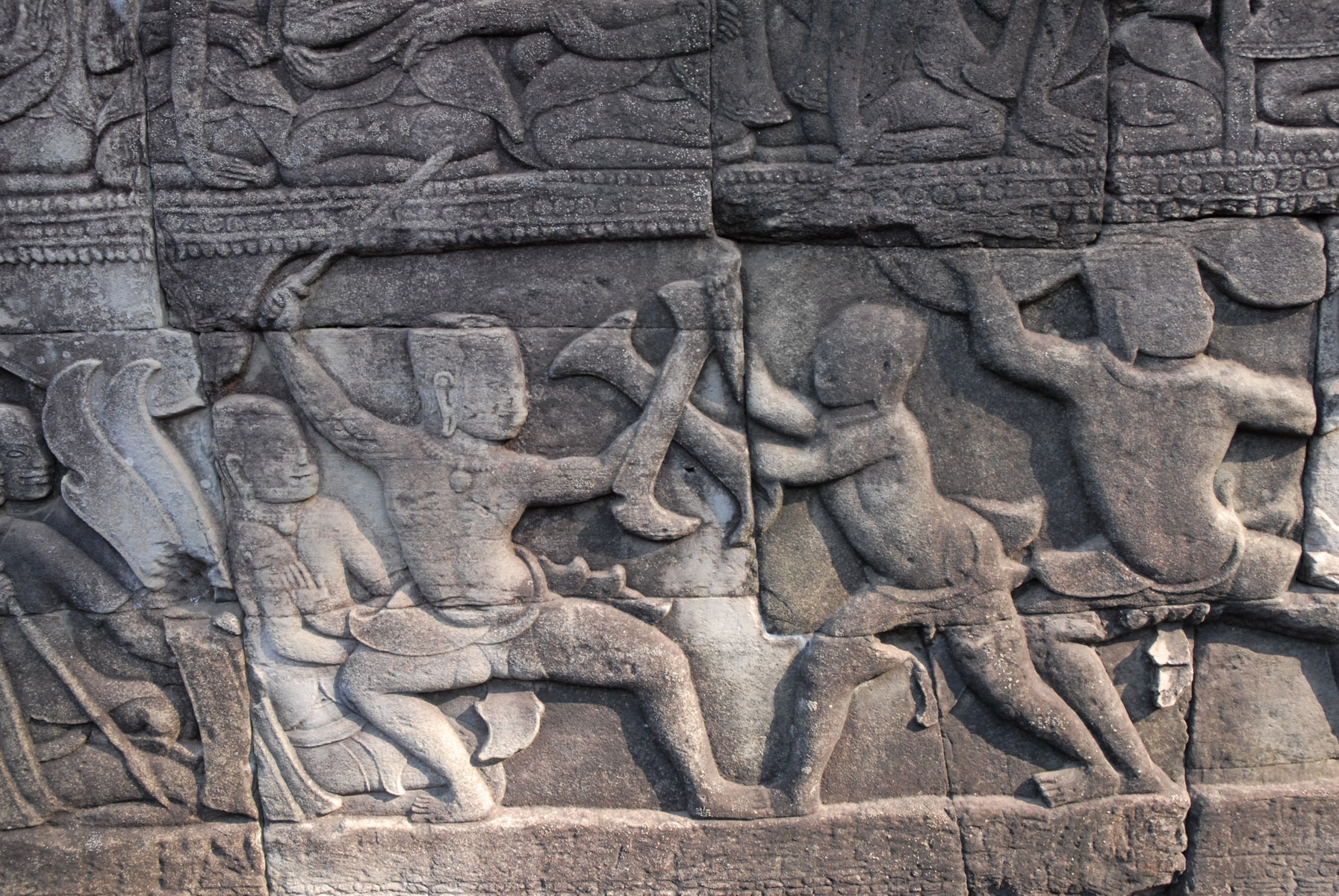
Martial artists of the Khmer Empire wield arm shields at the forearm similar to tonfa in this bas-relief at Cambodia's 12th/13th century Bayon temple

Although the tonfa is most commonly associated with the Okinawan martial arts, its origin is heavily debated. One of the most commonly cited origins is China, although origins from Indonesia to Okinawa are also possible. Although modern martial artists often cite that the tonfa derives from a millstone handle used by peasants, martial arts in Okinawa were historically practised by the upper classes who imported martial arts from China and elsewhere, and it is likely that the weapon was imported from outside Okinawa. The Chinese and Malay words for the weapon (guai and topang respectively) literally mean "crutch", which may suggest the weapon originating from such device. In Cambodia and Thailand, a similar weapon is used consisting of a pair of short clubs tied onto the forearms, known in Thai as mai sok and in Khmer as staupe. In Thailand and Malaysia, the mai sok often has a similar design to the tonfa, with a perpendicular handle rather than being tied on. In Vietnam, a similar weapon called the song xỉ is made of a pair of steel or aluminum bars. The song xỉ is used as a small shield to protect the forearms and has a sharp tip at the end to attack.

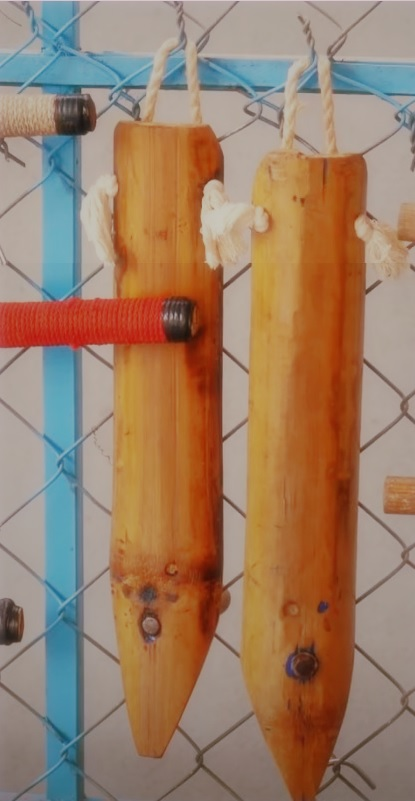
A pair of Cambodian "tonfa" or staupe which is an arm shield with a pointed edge

== Types of tonfa ==
There are different versions of the Okinawan tonfa, but the basic design is the same. The small grip is at one end of the tonfa. The main body of the tonfa is where there are variations. The most popular form of tonfa has rounded sides and a rounded bottom which makes a semicircle. The square tonfa has rectangular faces on the main body of the weapon. A paddle-shape tonfa has the bottom half wider than the front half and looks like a paddle. Another tonfa has a rounded body throughout. A crude pointed tonfa has the front heads and back heads ending in a pointed design. This can be used for stabbing defense.

== Usage ==
The tonfa can be used for blocking and striking. The tonfa measures about three centimeters past the elbow when gripped. There are three grips, honte-mochi (natural), gyakute-mochi (reverse) and tokushu-mochi (special). The natural grip places the handle in the hand with the long arm resting along the bottom of the forearm. This grip provides protection or brace along one's forearms, and also provides reinforcement for backfist, elbow strikes, and punches. In use, the tonfa can swing out to the gyakute grip for a strike or thrust. Martial artists may also flip the tonfa and grab it by the shaft, called tokushu-mochi. This allows use of the handle as a hook in combat, similar to the kama (sickle). This grip is uncommon but is used in the kata Yaraguwa.

Blocking techniques involve a sidestepping maneuver. This allows the block to stop the attack while providing a way to gain entry. The block can be used to block high attack and low attacks.

Law enforcement agencies started using a variation of the tonfa in 1972 known as a side handled baton but best known as the "PR-24" as that was the name of the most popular model. Many United States agencies started phasing out their use of batons for standard patrols after the Rodney King beating, in which batons including the PR-24 were used by several officers.

== See also ==
- Okinawan weapons
- Hungarian shield
- Salawaku
- Side-handle baton
