= Krabi–krabong =

Weapon-based martial art from Thailand

Krabi Krabong
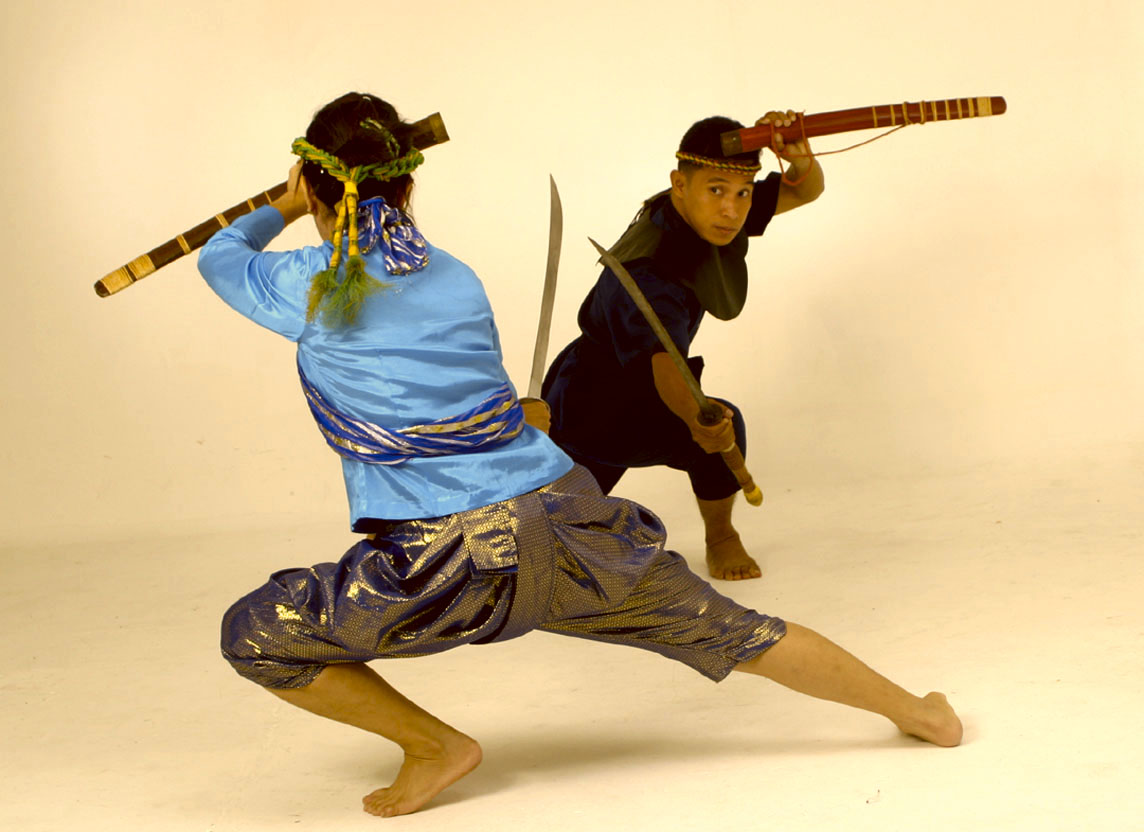
- Krabi-krabong practitioners with Daab swords
- Focus: Weaponry
- Country of origin: Thailand
- Famous practitioners: Lamp Sakkapoom, Tony Jaa
- Olympic sport: No
- Meaning: Sword-staff

Krabi-Krabong (Thai: กระบี่กระบอง, pronounced [krā.bìː krā.bɔ̄ːŋ]) is a weapon-based martial art from Thailand. It is closely related to other Southeast Asian fighting styles such as Silat, Burmese banshay and Cambodian kbach kun boran. The royal bodyguard corps of the late King Bhumibol Adulyadej (Rama IX) were said to be highly trained in krabi-krabong.

== Weapons ==
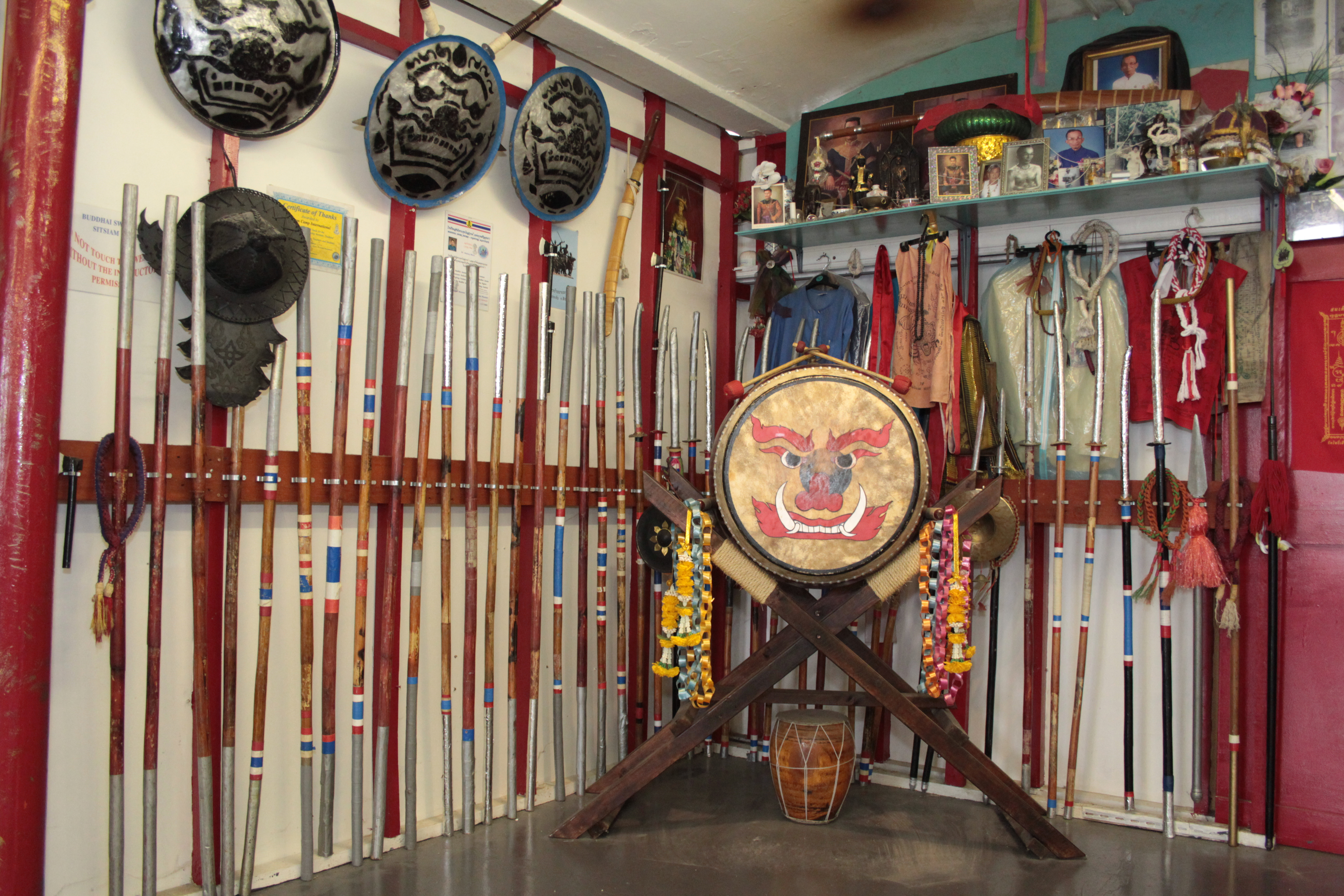
Krabi-krabong camp

The system's name refers to its main weapons, namely the Krabi (Thai Cutlass) and Krabong (staff). Typically, practitioner will be practicing "Daab Song Mue" (duel wielding sword). Unarmed krabi-krabong (muay boran) makes use of kicks, pressure point strikes, joint locks, holds, and throws.

The weapons of krabi-krabong include the following:

- Krabi (Thai: กระบี่): cutlass/curved sword
- Daab (Thai: ดาบ): single-edge sword
- Krabong (Thai: กระบอง): stick/ cudgel, usually either paired or used with a shield. Not very popular in present-day so often gets confused with long pole
- Daab song mue (Thai: ดาบสองมือ): Thai double swords, one in each hand
- Kean/Lo (Thai: เขน/โล่): buckler/shield made from wood or buffalo hide
- Phlong (Thai: พลอง): staff/pole, often mislabeled as Krabong
- Ngao (Thai: ง้าว): bladed staff
- Mae sowk (Thai: ไม้ศอกสั้น): a pair of clubs worn on the forearms

Each weapon is taught from both leads through a series of drills which can be used interchangeably with the various weapons.

== Origins ==
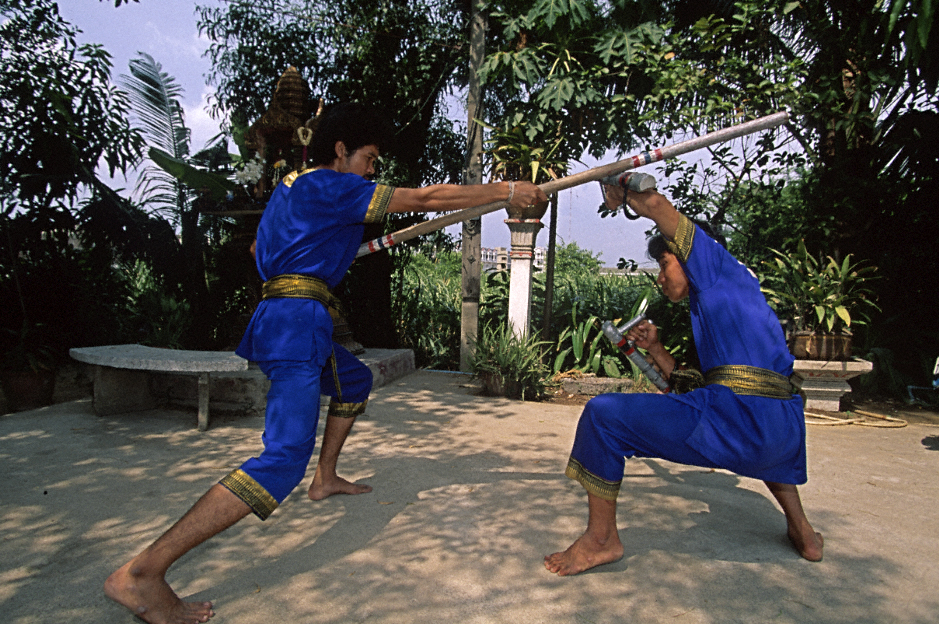
Krabi-krabong practitioners with Krabong and Mai sok san.

Krabi–krabong was developed by the ancient Thai warriors for fighting on the battlefield. It was likely used in conjunction with muay boran but whether the two arts were developed together or independently is uncertain. Early warfare in Indochina was mostly between rival kingdoms and were fought en masse. Individual fighters were armoured and carried rhino hide shields. The Burmese invasion of 1767 resulted in the loss of many historical records and cultural documents. However, the Thai fighting arts were traditionally passed down orally and did not rely on written documents for their preservation. Simon de la Loubère, the French diplomat from the court of Louis XIV, observed the existence of muay Thai and Krabi–krabong in his famous account Du Royaume de Siam (1689) while visiting the Ayutthaya Kingdom in 1688.

Archaeological findings and classical dances bear testament to the myriad of weapons that were once used in Thailand. Some of them are no longer found in the country's martial arts today, such as the kris (dagger), hawk (spear), trishula (either long or tekpi "short-handled trident"), daab (straight sword) and vajra. Entire dances were built on individual weapons, and calisthenics used by the modern Thai military are still based on these dances.

The weapons, their design and the pre-fight war dance in krabi-krabong show evidence of Indian derivation combined with Chinese characteristics. South Indian scholars, holy men, settlers and traders were especially influential in the evolution of Thai culture and martial arts. The Tamil stick-fighting style of silambam was of particular importance to the history of numerous Southeast Asian fighting systems. During the colonial period, silambam became more common in Southeast Asia than in India where it was banned by the British rulers.

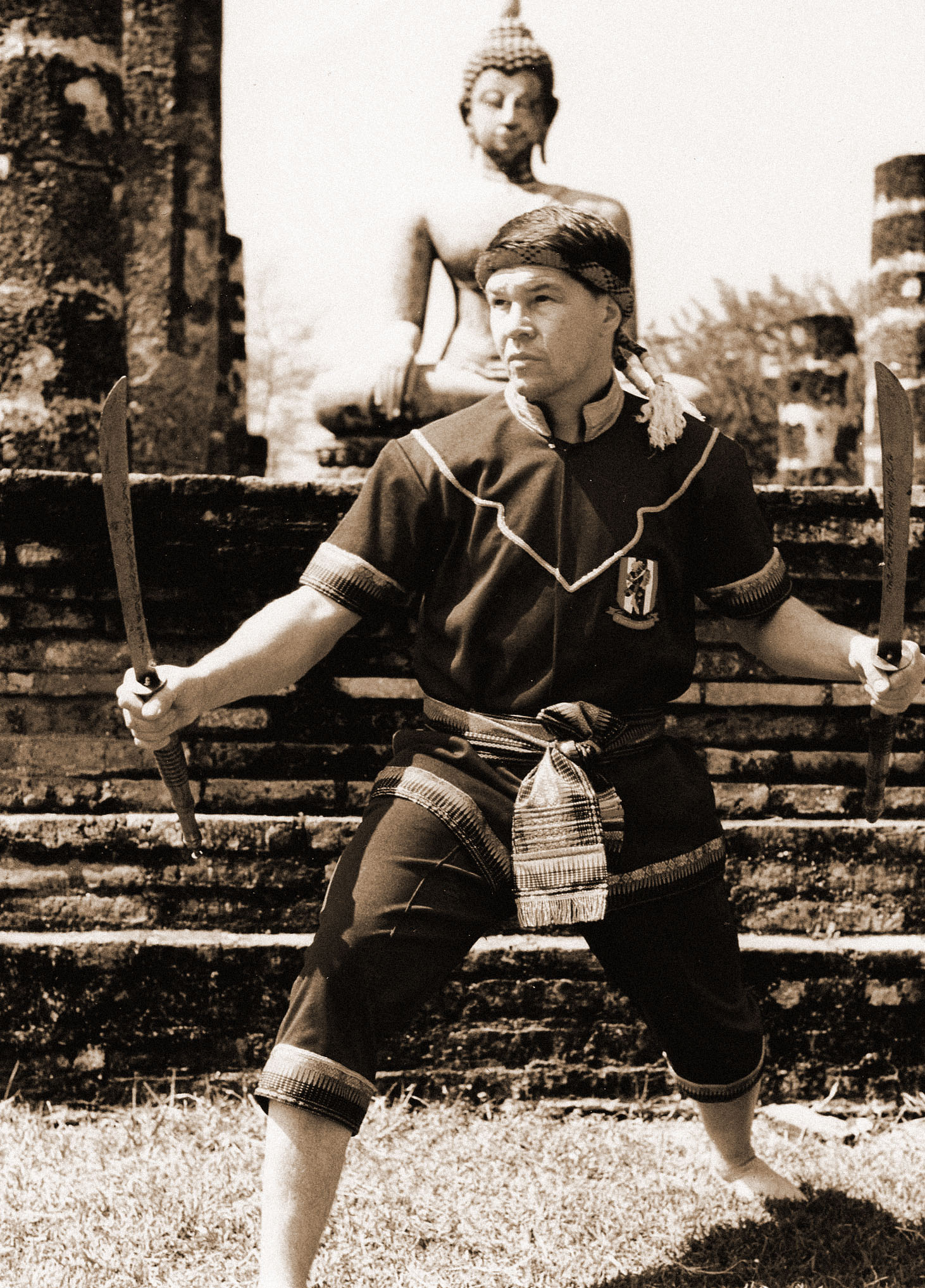
Krabi-krabong practitioner with Daab song mue, double swords.

Asian elephants were an integral part of warfare in Thailand. They would commonly be mounted by higher-ranking warriors like generals or royalty. To choose a successor to Intaraja I, his two sons fought on elephants. Krabi–krabong was often practiced by the palace mahouts or elephant trainers. From the back of an elephant, archers could shoot arrows at enemies below or, if he was wielding a polearm, engage in hand-to-hand combat with another mounted fighter. After the 15th-century introduction of gunpowder, elephants served as tanks with cannons mounted on their backs. The legs were the war-elephant's weak spot, so they had to be guarded by up to four foot soldiers. Although mahouts no longer practice martial arts, reenactments of such battles are staged by performers who are often from families that have been training elephants since the Ayutthaya Kingdom.

As Indochinese trade extended to Japan, small communities of Japanese people were living and trading around the region. After the Battle Of Sekigahara in 1600, many of those from the losing side of the war came to Thailand. Others were pirates or official traders who arrived on the Red Seal Ships. The Japanese fled Ayutthaya after the Bamars invaded in 1767 but they left their influence on the local fighting arts. Many of the techniques, stances, weapons and throws of krabi-krabong are similar to those found in jujutsu and Okinawan kobudō.

In Thailand, as with other countries in Southern and Southeast Asia, monks acted as teachers to their local community. Young boys would be sent to the temples where, aside from learning about Theravada Buddhism, they would be taught subjects ranging from languages to astrology. One such establishment was the Buddhaisawan Temple in Ayutthaya where the monks taught sword-fighting to their students. The origin of these monks is unknown but they are believed to have come from the kingdom of Lan Na in Northern Thailand. The modern Buddhaisawan Sword Fighting Institute was led by Sumai Mesamana until his death in 1998. His son Pramote Mesamana began training in krabi-krabong at the age of 6. According to the younger Mesamana, the art was passed down in his family from father to son ever since the Ayutthaya Kingdom.

== Historical practitioners ==
=== Naresuan the Great ===
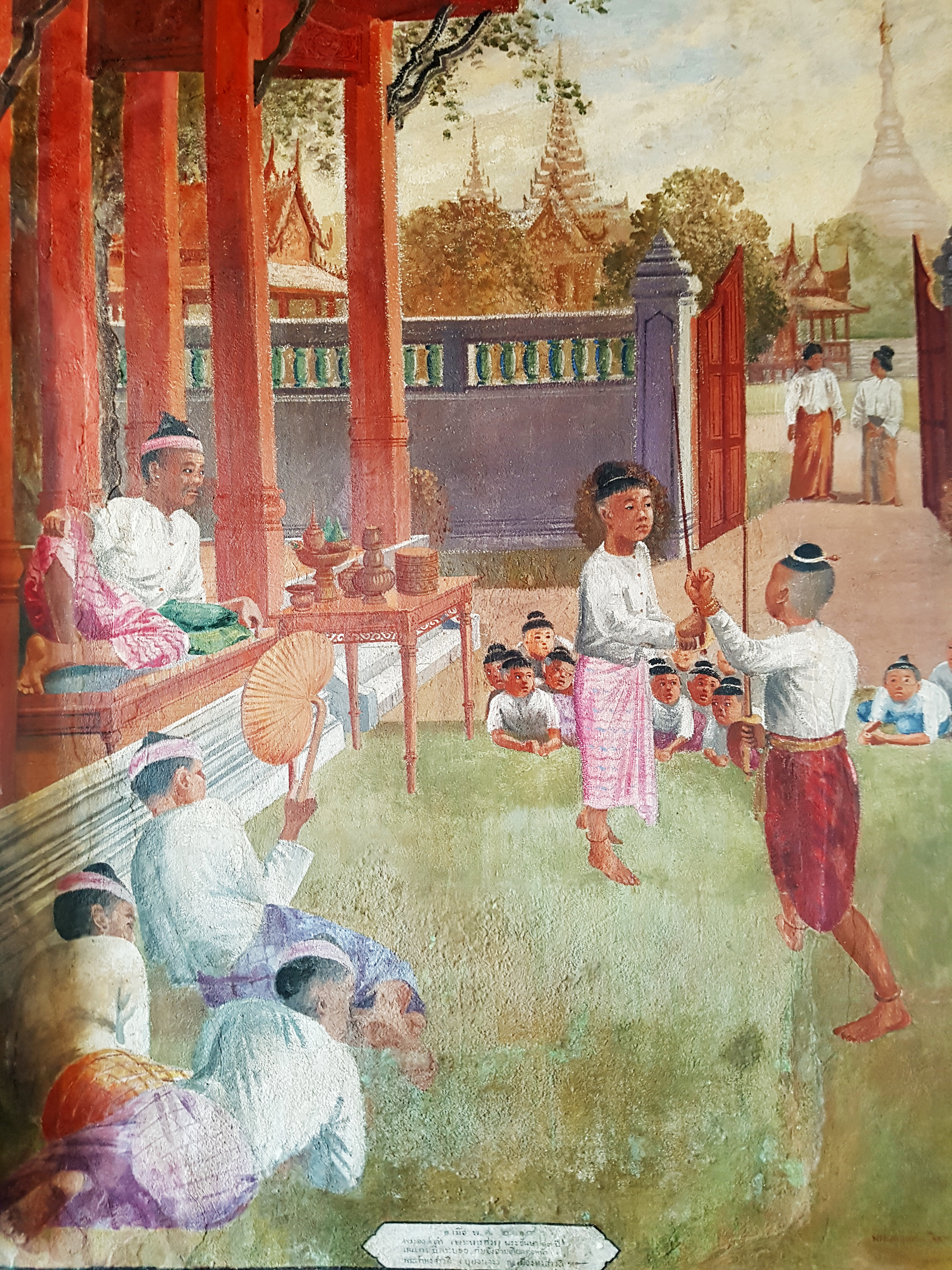
Mural painting: Naresuan's krabi-krabong (right) with Mingyi Swa.

During the 16th century, the First Toungoo Empire ruled over parts of Thailand. Naresuan was born to King Maha Thammaracha but until the age of 16 he was a hostage of the Bamars. Upon his return to the Ayutthaya Kingdom, he renounced allegiance to Bamars on behalf of his father the king. Having studied at Wat Buddhaisawan, Naresuan was well-versed in fighting with the single-edge sword (daab). The Bamars attacked the capital numerous times in succession but were always repelled by Naresuan's forces. In a final attempt to retake their Thai states, the Bamars sent an army of 25,000 warriors led by Mingyi Swa, the crown prince of Burma atop a war-elephant.

Knowing he was outnumbered, Naresuan charged his own elephant through the Burmese soldiers and fought directly with the prince. Using a halberd (ngao), Naresuan cleaved the crown prince in two from the shoulder to the hip. With their monarch now dead, the Burmese fled the battlefield and wouldn't become a serious threat to Thai sovereignty for more than a century. Naresuan ascended the throne in 1590 and under his rule the Thai encompassed the Shan States and part of Cambodia.

=== King Taksin ===
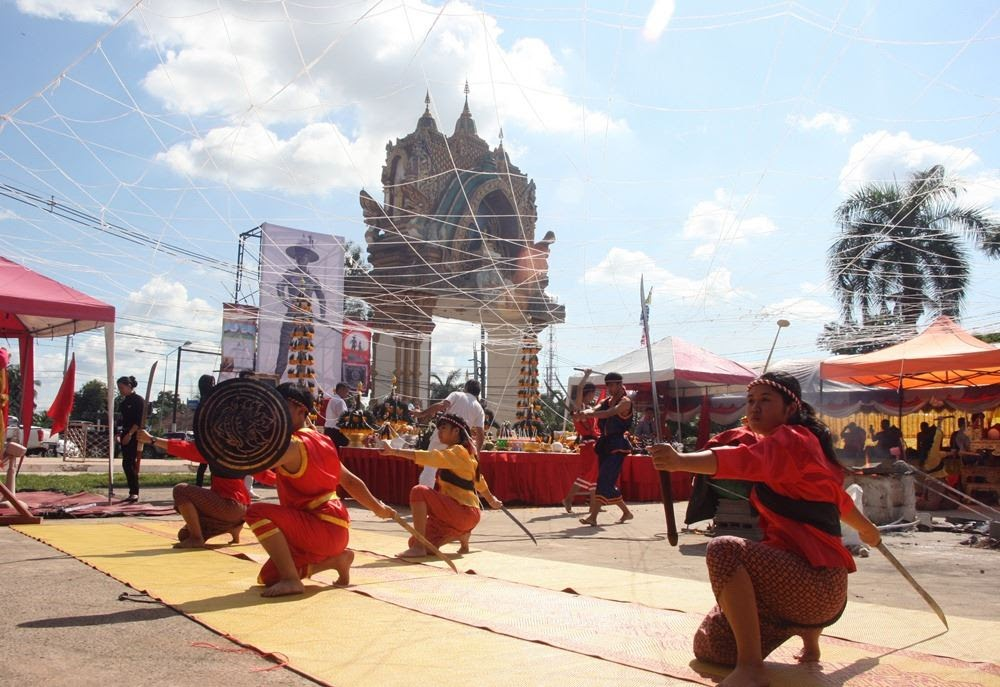
Sword dancers at the foundation stone laying ceremony for King Taksin's monument at Wat Khung Taphao, Uttaradit

The Ayutthaya Kingdom became progressively weaker during the eighteenth century. The Thais and Burmese had been almost constantly fighting each other along the border territories since the time of King Naresuan the Great. In 1758 the Bamars began a siege which lasted nine years. Buildings, palaces and temples were laid to ruins while documents, archives and records were all destroyed. Royal treasures were stolen and all but 10,000 of the city's one million inhabitants were sold into slavery.

Taksin learned krabi-krabong while studying in Wat Buddhaisawan as a boy. But more than his martial expertise, it was Taksin's skill as a military strategist that allowed him to quickly attain the rank of general. Before the capture of Ayutthaya, the young general Taksin fled with 500 followers to Rayong. He reorganised his forces and began attacking the Burmese invaders in small bands, destroying their supply routes. Word spread and within a few months Taksin rallied the Thai people to battle once again. Despite being only half the size of the Burmese army, Taksin's troops managed to drive out the conquerors and restored Thailand to nearly its former size. With the previous king, Ekkathat, now dead, Taksin was convinced that he was Gautama Buddha's reincarnation and proclaimed himself king in 1767. Seven years later, he decided to give up his role as military commander and instead sent out generals to campaign in his stead.

Among all the warriors under Taksin's command, the greatest fighter was Phraya Pichai Daab Hak, a nickname meaning "broken sword". Phraya Pichai was an expert with the dual swords (daab song mue) and acquired his moniker during a battle in which he continued fighting after one of his swords was broken. Another notable general was Rama I. Though not as skilled a martial artist as Phraya Pichai, Chakri was as brilliant a commander as Taksin. Under his leadership, Siam captured the Lao Kingdom of Vientiane, Luang Prabang, and Chiang Mai.

Taksin ruled from 1767–1782, but near the end of his reign he became increasingly dictatorial. He was said to have frequently flogged Buddhists monks and executed some of his concubines on false charges. A revolt broke out in the capital of the Thonburi Kingdom and it was agreed by both the army and the nobility that Chakri should take Taksin's place as king. The current royal family of Thailand is descended from King Chakri, also called Rama I. Taksin himself was put to death but not in a conventional beheading. Instead, Taksin was wrapped in a velvet bag and beaten to death by his ministers with clubs. This method of execution was instituted to avoid spilling royal blood, and Taksin is the only known Thai king to have been killed in such a way.

== Modern day Krabi Krabong system ==
=== Daab Chao Ram ===
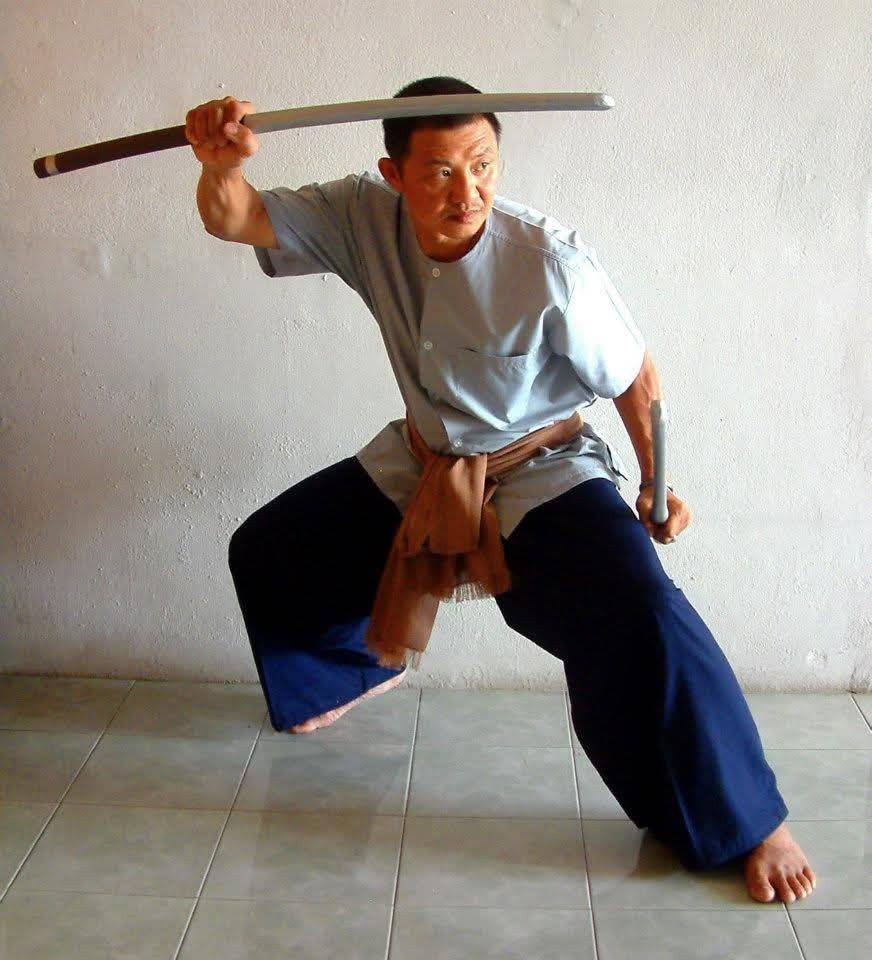
Sword dancer in the 'Daab Chao Ram' stance

"Daab Chao Ram", a system of Krabi Krabong wielding mainly Thai single and/or duel swords (“Daab”, Thai single edge sword). This system was created at Ramkhamhaeng University Thai Weaponry Club by the various students of the numerous sword schools from all over Thailand who compiled their knowledge, skills, and experience which lead to the creation of “Daab Chao Ram”. Daab Chao Ram “Daab” meaning Thai single edge sword, “Chao” meaning lord, and “Ram” is short for King Ramkhamhaeng or Por Khun Ramkhamhaeng Maharaj. All of them together can mean either: 1) Sword of Lord Ram, 2) Legion of Lord Ram, or 3) Might of Lord Ram (meaning might differ from person to person). The name was chosen to commemorate Por Khun Ramkhamhaeng Maharaj for his good deed to the country and for his bravery in battle that earned him the nickname “Khamhaeng” meaning, bold. One prominent school that teaches Daab Chao Ram is Thai Achira. Lamp Sakkapoom is one of the highly regarded practitioner and instructor of Daab Chao Ram. He is also a skilled Muay Chaiya fighter.

=== Sritrairatana Fencing Club ===
Sritrairat belongs to the Trairatana family since the mid-late 1800. Since the begin of 1900 Sritrairat has been the standard for combat and Ram Awut (weapons dance). It encompassed all weapons as listed above but also daab thai, free sparring and against multiple opponents.

Sritrairat, or rather a shorter version of it, is also taught to the Royal Thai Navy Commandos. Also many of the RTN Officers send their children to learn the art and many of the Thai University have a Sritrairat club.

Many styles that have been created in teh past 50 years have had instruction from Sritrairat Masters, in primis the late Ajarn Thonglor Trairatana and Ajarn Sitthipong.

Sritrairatana Fencing Club is now headed by Ajarn Chon (John) in Thonburi, Bangkok, Kingdom of Thailand.

In Europe there are a couple of people who teach pure Sritrairat and a few others that teach Sritrairat-derived styles of Krabi Krabong.

The oldest pure Sritrairat player in Europe is Max Panizzo, in South of England, UK with long time students in Northern Italy. He spent the last 20 years teaching seminar on Thai Sword across Europe.

== See also ==
- Angampora
- Banshay
- Bataireacht
- Bōjutsu
- Gatka
- Jūkendō
- Kalaripayattu
- Kendo
- Kenjutsu
- Kuttu Varisai
- Mardani khel
- Silambam
- Tahtib
- Thang-ta
- Varma kalai
- Muay Thai
- Muay Boran
- Muay Chaiya
- Lethwei
- Kbach kun boran
- Silat
