= Muay Chaiya =

Style of traditional Thai boxing

Muay Chaiya is a style of traditional Thai boxing (Muay Boran), founded over 250 years ago. The founder was believed to be an army leader of the Rattanakosin Kingdom in the age of King Rama V. He taught Muay Chaiya to the governor, his son, and to regular townspeople. The word “Muay” refers to boxing and “Chaiya” refers to the name of the city. The people who made Muay Chaiya famous are Kham Sriyapai, Plong Jumnonthong, and Nil Paksi. Plong Jumnongthong popularized Muay Chaiya by showing Muay Chaiya techniques and winning a fight with the boxer from Korat (Nakornratchasrima) in front of King Rama V. Then, King Rama V awarded him the title of “muen muay mee cheu” (หมื่นมวยมีชื่อ).

The unique feature that stands out for Muay Chaiya is the incorporation of low stance, an erected 45-degree triangle guard, and dynamic footwork. Further, Muay Chaiya fighters also train to shift from one position to the other utilizing it's agile footwork to close in or create gap between opponent thus earning the nickname "Tha Dee Chaiya" (Graceful Movement, Chaiya).

Muay Chaiya has both of offensive and defensive techniques. Offensive techniques are throwing, pinning, grappling, and breaking. Defensive techniques are dodging, pushing, and blocking. Muay Chaiya also has a specific footwork called Yang Sam Khum. The word “Yang” refers to walk, while the word “Sam” refers to three, and the word “Khum” refers to a point. Yang Sam Khum uses three steps to change the position of the front and back legs. The key advantage of Yang Sam Khum is its speed and precision.

== Renowned Muay Chaiya teachers in the modern era ==
- Lamp Sakkapoom (Khru Lamp)

== See also ==
- Krabi Krabong
- Lerdrit
- Muay Boran
- Muay Thai
- Tomoi
