= Ngao (polearm) =

Thai polearm

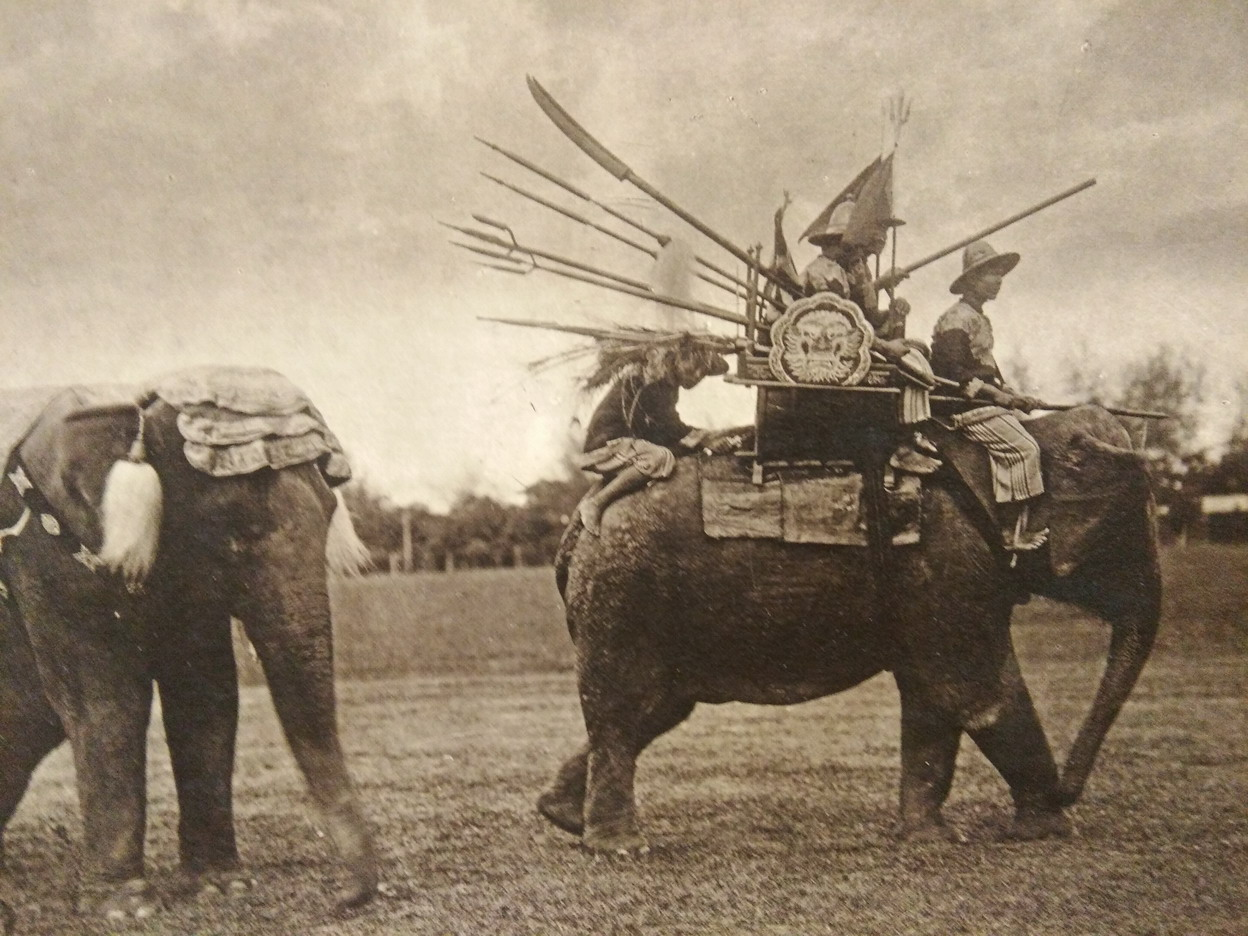
Siamese war elephant with ngao and other polearms

Ngao (ง้าว,ของ้าว) is a polearm that was traditionally used during the 18th century in Thailand.

== See also ==
- Stick fighting
- List of martial arts weapons
