= Muay boran =

Unarmed martial arts of Thailand

Muay Boran
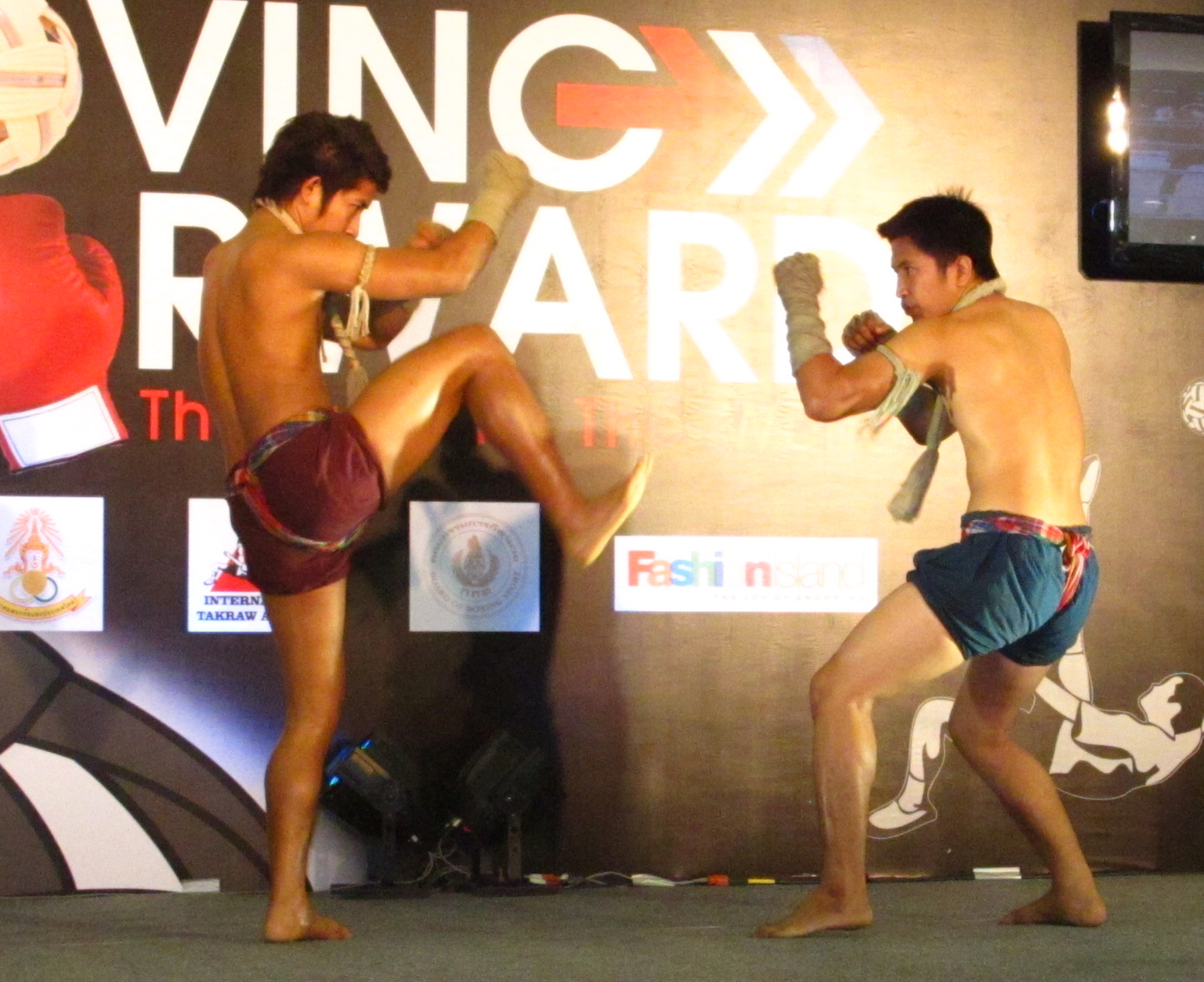
- Country of origin: Thailand
- Famous practitioners: Tony Jaa, Lamp Sakkapoom
- Parenthood: Musti-yuddha, Krabi Krabong
- Descendant arts: Muay Thai, Zero Range Combat, Lerdrit
- Olympic sport: No

Muay Boran (Thai: มวยโบราณ, RTGS: muai boran, pronounced [mūa̯j bōːrāːn], lit. ' ancient boxing') or originally Toi Muay (Thai: ต่อยมวย, lit. 'punching boxing') is an umbrella term for the ancient unarmed martial arts of Thailand prior to the introduction of modern equipment and rules in the 1930s.

== Contemporary history ==
In the early 20th century, one of King Chulalongkorn's sons, Prince Urubongse Rajasombhoj, died. He commanded his officers to gather fighters of exceptional skill to perform as part of the funeral ceremonies. Three fighters in particular stood out and were granted titles of muen as a means to promote the quality of muay, which had been diminishing at the time. The chosen fighters were from different parts of the country: Daeng Thaiprasoet from the Northeast region became Muen Changat Choengchok; Klueng Tosa-at from the Central region became Muen Muemaenmat; Prong Chamnongthong from the Southern region became Muen Muaymichue. Each name means and corresponds to a specific style of muay fighting: Changatchoengchok means "effective style of punching", Muemaenmat means "skillful punches", and Muaymichue translates to "muay with a reputation".

From these grew a few different styles of muay: Lopburi, Khorat, Chaiya, and Thasao respectively. Additional varieties came to be later on, but these three styles were originally actualized under the Muay Boran umbrella. The strength of this style are the use of hands, shins and knees are developed. The weakness includes having to be in good shape to be efficient.

Muay Thai Boran was originally developed in the 13th century for self-defense and also taught to the Thai military for use in warfare. Muay Boran originally is a martial art system which has deadly techniques, grappling techniques and ground fighting techniques apart from its stand up techniques. This differs from modern-day Muay Thai, which consists only of stand up and is only a ring sport. Matches between practitioners of the art then began to be held. These soon became an integral part of Thai culture with fights being held at festivals and fighters from the different areas of Thailand testing their styles against each other. Fighters began to wrap their hands and forearms in hemp rope which not only protected their fists from injury but also made their strikes more likely to cut an opponent. Muay boran fighters were highly respected and the best were enlisted into the King's royal guard. During the 1920s-30s King Rama VII modernized the Thai martial arts competitions, introducing referees, boxing gloves, rounds and western boxing rings. Many of the traditional Muay Boran techniques were banned or were not practical with the addition of the new rules, and so muay boran went into decline.

Tony Jaa's martial arts films are credited with helping to showcase the combat systems of Muay Thai, Muay Boran, and "Muay Kotchasaan" (a fighting style Jaa and his mentor Panna Rittikrai developed in 2005).

== Styles ==
=== Muay Chaiya ===
Muay Chaiya is a local Muay art in Chaiya District, Surat Thani Province. It was so famous during the reigns of King Rama V and King Rama VI that Plong Chamnongthong, who was a student of the Chaiya ruler, was bestowed with the title Muen Muaymeechue and became famous. The strength of this style is that the techniques can be used against heavier people and can be used if the user is not in great shape. The weakness of this style is that the attacks are not decisive and require counterattacks.

=== Muay Korat ===
Muay Korat was developed in Nakhon Ratchasima (Korat) in Thailand and was popularized in the city of Korat since the reign of King Rama V during the Rattanakosin Era. The style's main strength is the power of its attacks, accomplished with the use of wide angle strikes from long distances and straight strikes from short distances. Korat boxers also focus on blocking the opponent's offense, usually with a neck hold that allows the boxer to land multiple strikes on the opponent. The style's main weakness is the loss of stamina after multiple strike attacks.

=== Muay Lopburi ===
Muay Lopburi is one of the oldest styles of Muay Boran; developed by the Mon people of Dvaravati, it originated in central Thailand around 7th century AD. Differently from Muay Korat, Lopburi focuses on speed and agility, with boxers trying to distract their opponent to find an opening for an attack. Afterwards, the boxer constantly pressures the opponent with his strikes while also controlling the pace with his footwork.

=== Muay Thasao ===
Muay Thasao is more recent compared to the other styles, and its main strength is its defense. Thasao boxers rely on speed and versatility, that allows them to change stance and posture as a way to adapt to their opponent's style while also protecting themselves from the opponent's leg kicks.

== Muay thai ==
Muay Thai was originally known simply as "muay". The addition of "Thai" was to differentiate the style from western boxing in the early 1900s. Muay "Boran" only recently became a term used to encompass the origins of Thai martial arts due to the historical writings of Grandmaster Khetr Sriyaphai (a Muay Chaiya practitioner) in the "Parithat Muay Thai" column. With the increasing popularity of Muay Thai in the last few decades, nationalistic supporters of Muay felt a need to establish a history of the martial art, resulting in a sometimes unfounded account of the background of Muay Thai and Muay Boran, extrapolated from brief mentions in written records.

== See also ==
- Krabi–krabong
- Kun Khmer
- Lethwei
- Muay Chaiya
- Muay Lao
- Muay Thai
- Sanda
- Silat
