= Rattanakosin Era =

Former Thai calendar era used in Siam

Rattanakosin Era (Thai: รัตนโกสินทรศก, RTGS: Rattanakosin Sok), abbreviated R.E. or R.S., was a year-numbering era formerly used in official documents of Siam. It counted years from the foundation of Rattanakosin, with R.E. 1 corresponding to the year in which Bangkok was established as the royal capital in 1782. The era was introduced for official use under King Chulalongkorn as part of the adoption of a solar calendar system, beginning on 1 April R.E. 108 (1889), and was replaced in general official use by the Buddhist Era under King Vajiravudh from 1 April 1913.

The Rattanakosin Era formed part of a broader reform of date reckoning in late nineteenth-century Siam, replacing older official practices based on the Thai lunar calendar and the Chula Sakarat era with a solar calendar system closer to the Gregorian calendar. R.E. dates appear in the Royal Gazette, laws, royal proclamations, official correspondence, royal writings, contemporary newspapers, and some coins and printed materials from the late reign of Chulalongkorn and the early reign of Vajiravudh.

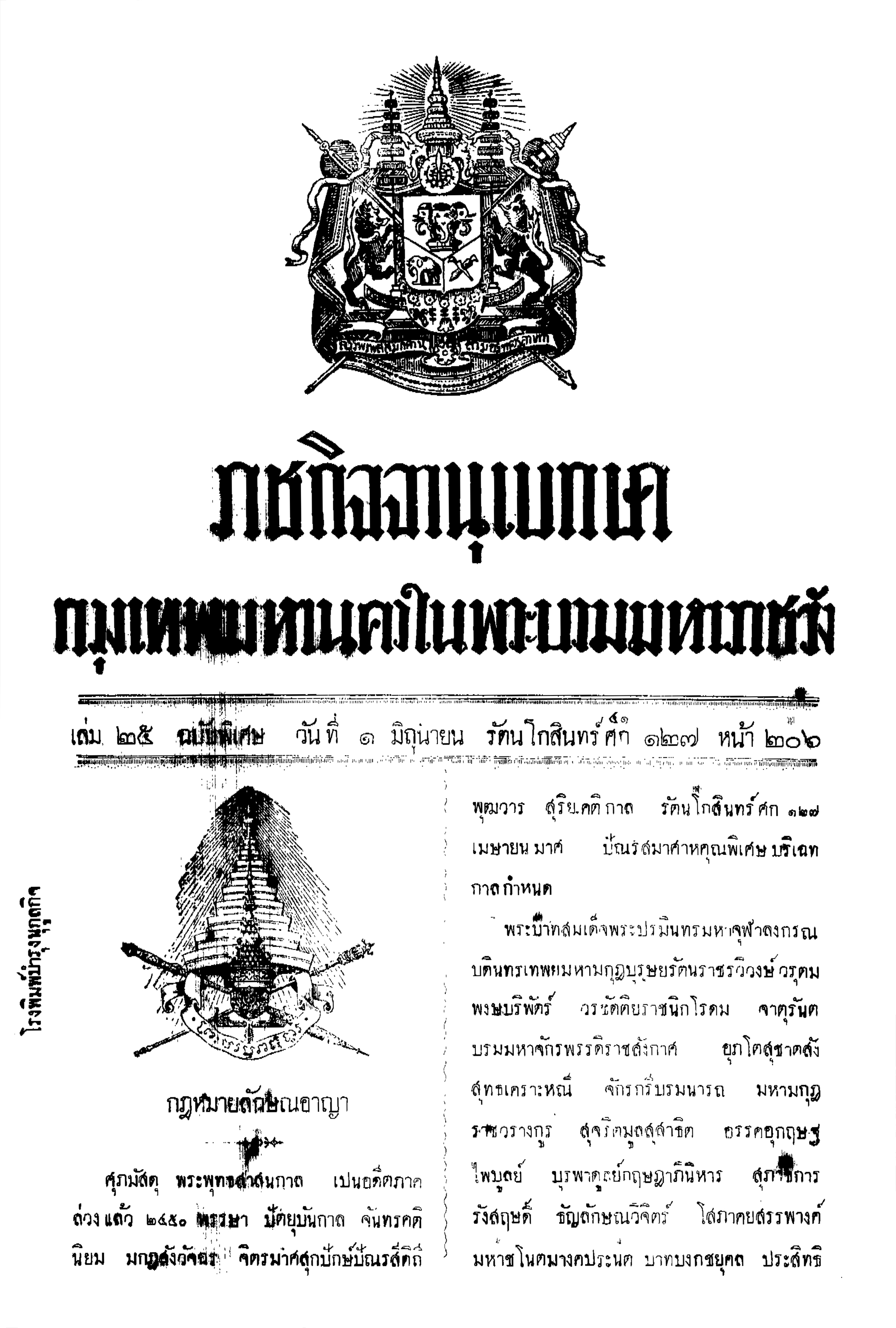
First page of the special issue of the Royal Gazette announcing the Penal Code of R.E. 127 (1908)

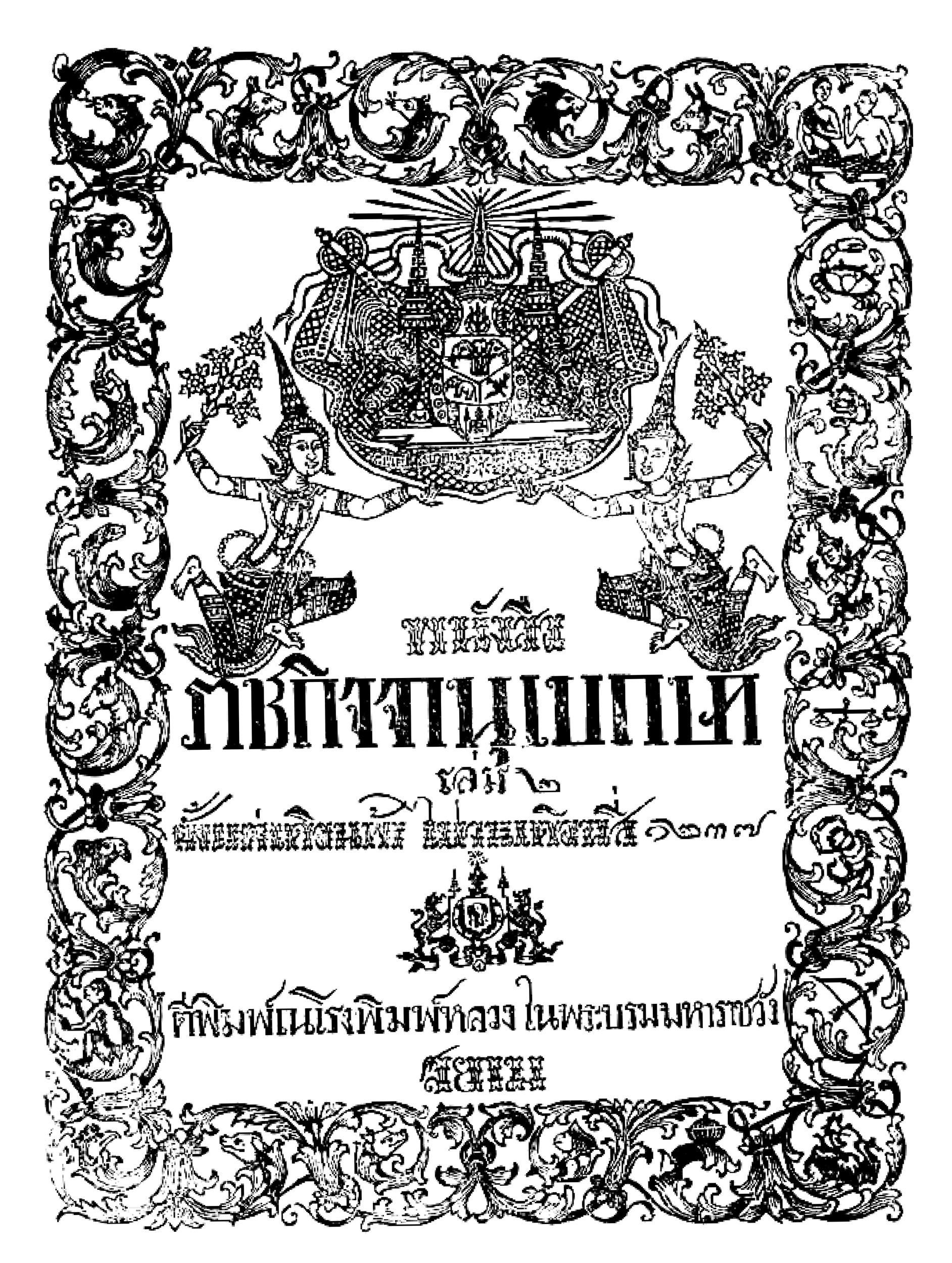
Cover of the Royal Gazette in the early reign of Chulalongkorn, before the adoption of the Rattanakosin Era

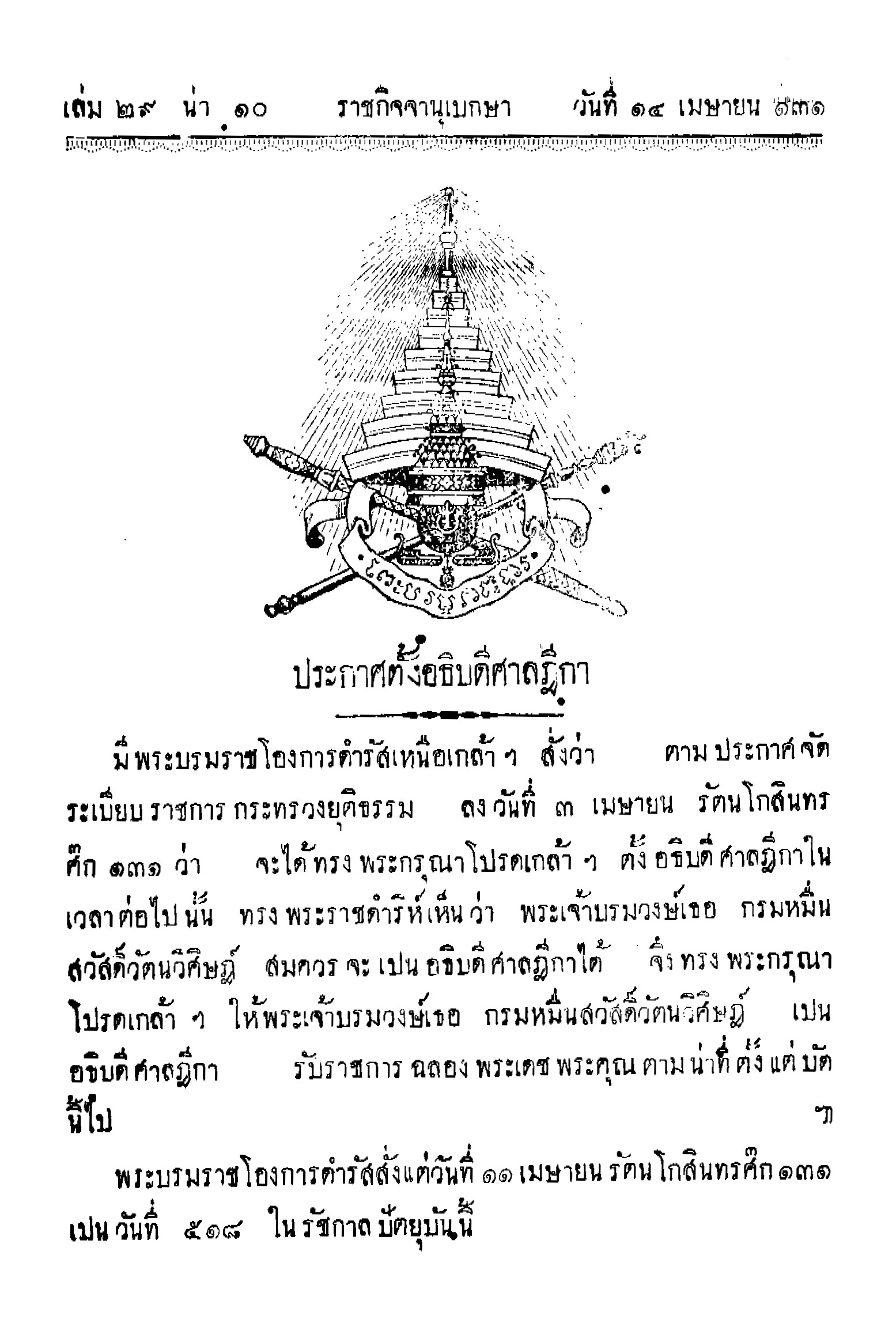
A page of the Royal Gazette in 1912, during the transition from Rattanakosin Era to Buddhist Era dating

== Name ==
The Thai term Rattanakosin Sok means "era of Rattanakosin". In contemporary Thai documents, the name appears in forms such as รัตนโกสินทรศก and รัตนโกสินทร์ศก. Its common Thai abbreviation is ร.ศ., corresponding in English to R.E. or R.S. The word ศก (sok) denotes an era or year-count beginning from a significant event.

The era should not be confused with the Rattanakosin Kingdom or the Rattanakosin period, both of which refer to broader historical periods of Thai history. In calendrical usage, Rattanakosin Era specifically refers to the official year-numbering system based on the foundation of Bangkok.

== Background ==
Before the introduction of the Rattanakosin Era, official date reckoning in Siam commonly used the Thai lunar calendar and Chula Sakarat. These systems were linked to lunar months, intercalary months, and intercalary days, and could be difficult to apply consistently in official administration and in comparison with Western calendar dates.

During the reign of King Chulalongkorn, Siam undertook wide-ranging reforms of administration, law, taxation, the military, and foreign relations. Calendar reform formed part of this process of state standardization. The new system aimed to replace older methods of reckoning days, months, and years with a solar calendar in which the months and the number of days were more regular.

The Office of the Royal Society notes that Thailand historically used several eras, including the Shalivahana era, Chula Sakarat, Buddhist Era, and Rattanakosin Era.

== Introduction ==
The Rattanakosin Era was introduced by the proclamation known in Thai as the Proclamation on the Use of the New Dates. The proclamation was dated Thursday, the twelfth waning day of the fourth lunar month, Year of the Rat, Chula Sakarat 1250, and was issued in the name of King Chulalongkorn. It ordered the new system of reckoning days, months, and years to be used from 1 April R.E. 108 onward.

The proclamation explicitly defined the new era as the year-count from the establishment of Bangkok as the royal capital. It stated that the era should be called "Rattanakosin Sok" (รัตนโกสินทร์ศก).

According to the National Archives of Thailand, the reform was based on the view that a good system of date reckoning should be close to the seasons, have reasonably regular month lengths, and be easy for people to understand. The proclamation therefore adopted a solar system of date reckoning and introduced the Rattanakosin Era for official use.

== Use ==
=== Government and law ===
The Rattanakosin Era was widely used in official documents of Siam, including laws, ministerial announcements, royal decrees, and issues of the Royal Gazette. Many laws from the period carried the R.E. year directly in their titles, such as the Penal Code of R.E. 127 and the law on defamation by spoken or written false statements of R.E. 118.

The Royal Gazette also used R.E. dates in commercial and administrative announcements. One early example is an announcement concerning the use of the royal emblem on goods, dated 20 April R.E. 108, shortly after the new system came into effect.

=== Royal writings ===
The era also appeared in royal writings and correspondence. A notable example is Klai Ban (ไกลบ้าน), the collection of royal letters written by King Chulalongkorn during his second visit to Europe. The first letter is headed from the royal yacht Maha Chakri and dated "Wednesday, 27 March, Rattanakosin Era 125" (วันพุฒ ที่ ๒๗ มีนาคม รัตนโกสินทรศก ๑๒๕). Since R.E. years began on 1 April, this date corresponds to 27 March 1907.

=== Newspapers and contemporary printed works ===
R.E. dates also appeared in contemporary newspapers and periodicals. The National Library of Thailand has digitized issues of periodicals such as Vajirayana Wiset (วชิรญาณวิเศษ), whose issues include dates in Rattanakosin Era years such as R.E. 108, 109, 110, and 111. Such materials show that the era was not limited to statutes and government proclamations but also appeared in public printed culture of the period.

=== Foreign relations ===
During the period in which the Rattanakosin Era was used, Siam concluded a number of treaties and agreements with Western powers, including the Anglo-Siamese Treaty of 1909 and agreements with France in the early twentieth century. English and French texts of these treaties normally used Common Era dates, while Thai official documents of the same period often used R.E. dates. The coexistence of these systems is important for comparing Thai official documents with foreign-language treaty texts.

== Replacement by the Buddhist Era ==
In the reign of King Vajiravudh, the Rattanakosin Era was replaced in general official use by the Buddhist Era. The change was justified on the grounds that R.E. was convenient for present and future dates but inconvenient for events before the foundation of Bangkok, since such dates would have to be counted backward as "before the Rattanakosin Era". The Buddhist Era, by contrast, had already appeared in important official documents and was considered more suitable for referring to events in Siamese chronicles and earlier history.

The proclamation explained the limitation of the Rattanakosin Era as follows:

The Rattanakosin Era now in use is convenient for use in the present and the future, but for matters in the past, if its use were required, it would make understanding difficult, since the years would have to be counted backward and called before the Rattanakosin Era.

— King Vajiravudh

The proclamation therefore ordered the Buddhist Era to be used in all general official business in place of the Rattanakosin Era. It also gave the conversion rule that any R.E. year plus 2324 gives the corresponding Buddhist Era year. The change took effect with the official year beginning on 1 April 1913.

== Legacy ==
The abbreviation R.E. is still encountered in the names of historical events and laws. The best-known example is the Franco-Siamese crisis of R.E. 112, more commonly known in English as the Franco-Siamese crisis of 1893.

== See also ==
- Thai solar calendar
- Buddhist calendar
- Thai lunar calendar
- Chula Sakarat
- Rattanakosin Kingdom
- Royal Thai Government Gazette
