= Origins of Asian martial arts =

The origins of Asian martial arts are diverse and scattered, having roots in various regions of Asia. Various Asian martial arts reference the study of animal movements as inspiration for martial arts techniques.

== Prehistory ==
The evolution of the martial arts has been described by historians in the context of countless historical battles. Building on the work of Laughlin (1956, 1961), Richard Rudgley argues that Mongolian wrestling, as well as the martial arts of the Chinese, Japanese and Aleut peoples, all have "roots in the prehistoric era and to a common Mongoloid ancestral people who inhabited north-eastern Asia."

== India ==
Dhanurveda, a section found in the Vedas (1700 BC - 1100 BC) contains references to martial arts. Around the 3rd century BC, the Yoga Sutras of Patanjali taught how to meditate single-mindedly on points located inside one's body, which was later used in martial arts, while various mudra finger movements were taught in Yogacara Buddhism. These elements of yoga, as well as finger movements in the nata dances, were later incorporated into various martial arts.

Indian martial arts were an important influence in the development of a number of modern Asian martial arts, particularly within the Indian cultural sphere (countries outside India influenced by Indian culture and religion) of Southeast Asia. Examples include Indo-Malay silat, Burmese banshay, naban and bando, Filipino escrima and kali, Thai krabi krabong and Cambodian bokator. Indian martial arts also influenced the various forms of Indochinese kickboxing, namely Muay Thai from Thailand, Muay Lao from Laos, Tomoi from Malaysia, Pradal Serey from Cambodia and Lethwei from Myanmar.

== China ==
Chinese boxing can be reliably traced back to the Zhou dynasty (1122-255 BC). During the Spring and Autumn period, the literature mentions displays of archery, fencing and wrestling by nobles. Warfare between rival states was conducted according to Confucian chivalry (deference to rank, attacking in turn, food sent to hungry enemies). During the Warring States period, warfare grew bloodier and common men were expected to have skill in personal attack (chi-chi).

Shaolin monastery records state that two of its very first monks, Huiguang and Sengchou, were expert in the martial arts years before the arrival of Bodhidharma. The martial arts Shuāi Jiāo and Sun Bin Quan predate the establishment of the Shaolin Monastery by centuries as does shǒubó (手搏).

Indian martial arts may have spread to China via the transmission of Buddhism in the early 5th or 6th centuries of the common era and thus influenced Shaolin Kungfu. Elements from Indian philosophy, like the Nāga, Rakshasa, and the fierce Yaksha were syncretized into protectors of Dharma; these mythical figures from the Dharmic religions figure prominently in Shaolinquan, Chang quan and staff fighting. The religious figures from Dharmic religions also figure in the movement and fighting techniques of Chinese martial arts. Various styles of kung fu are known to contain movements that are identical to the Mudra hand positions used in Hinduism and Buddhism, both of which derived from India. Similarly, the 108 pressure points in Chinese martial arts are believed by some to be based on the marmam points of Indian varmakalai.

The predominant telling of the diffusion of the martial arts from India to China involves a 5th-century prince turned into a monk named Bodhidharma who is said to have traveled to Shaolin, sharing his own style and thus creating Shaolinquan. According to Wong Kiew Kit, the Monk's creation of Shaolin arts "...marked a watershed in the history of kungfu, because it led to a change of course, as kungfu became institutionalized. Before this, martial arts were known only in general sense."

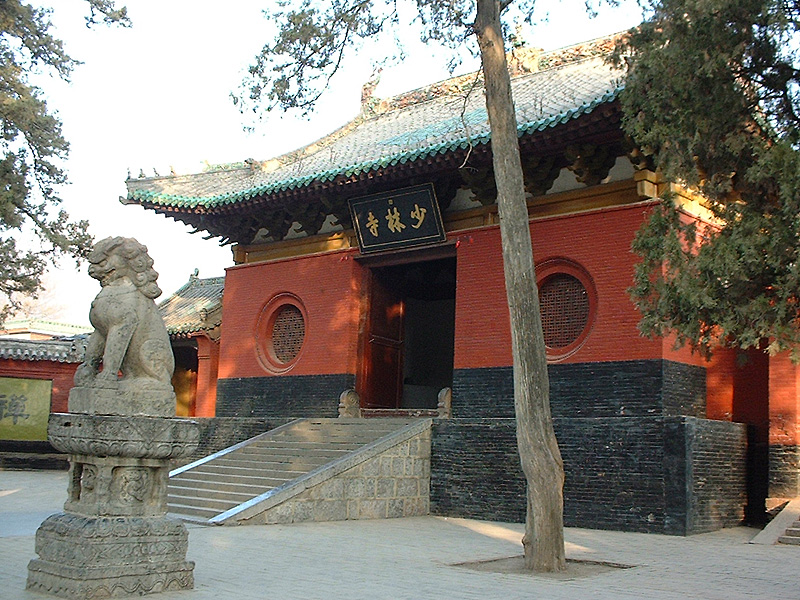
Main gate of the Shaolin temple in Henan.

The association of Bodhidharma with martial arts is attributed to Bodhidharma's own Yi Jin Jing, though its authorship has been disputed by several modern historians such as Tang Hao, Xu Zhen and Matsuda Ryuchi. The oldest known available copy of the Yi Jin Jing was published in 1827 and the composition of the text itself has been dated to 1624. According to Matsuda, none of the contemporary texts written about the Shaolin martial arts before the 19th century, such as Cheng Zongyou's Exposition of the Original Shaolin Staff Method or Zhang Kongzhao's Boxing Classic: Essential Boxing Methods, mention Bodhidharma or credit him with the creation of the Shaolin martial arts. The association of Bodhidharma with the martial arts only became widespread after the 1904–1907 serialization of the novel The Travels of Lao Ts'an in Illustrated Fiction Magazine.

The discovery of arms caches in the monasteries of Chang'an during government raids in 446 AD suggests that Chinese monks practiced martial arts prior to the establishment of the Shaolin Monastery in 497. Moreover, Chinese monasteries, not unlike those of Europe, in many ways were effectively large landed estates, that is, sources of considerable wealth which required protection that had to be supplied by the monasteries' own manpower.

== Japan ==
The historical origin of Japanese martial arts can be found in the warrior traditions of the samurai and the caste system that restricted the use of weapons by members of the non-warrior classes. Originally, samurai were expected to be proficient in many weapons, as well as unarmed combat, and attain the highest possible mastery of combat skills, for the purpose of glorifying either themselves or their lord. Over time, this purpose gave way to a philosophy of achieving spiritual goals by striving to perfect their martial skills.

== Korea ==
Wrestling, called Ssireum, and Taekkyon are the oldest forms of unarmed fighting in Korea. Besides being used to train soldiers, these were also popular among villagers during festivals, for dancing, mask performance and sport-fighting. The ancient Koreans did develop their own comprehensive system of unarmed weapon-based combat, but they had a preference for bows and arrows. It appears that during the Goguryeo dynasty, (37 BC – 668 AD) subak (empty-handed fighting), swordsmanship, bow and arrow, spear-fighting and horse riding were practiced.

In 1593, Korea received help from China to win back Pyongyang from the Japanese. During one of the battles, the Koreans learned about a martial art manual titled Ji Xiao Xin Shu (紀效新書), written by the Chinese military strategist Qi Jiguang. King Seonjo (1567–1608) took a personal interest in the book, and ordered his court to study the book. This led to the creation of the Muyejebo (무예제보, Hanja: 武藝諸譜) in 1599 by Han Gyo, who had studied the use of several weapons with the Chinese army. Soon this book was revised in the Muyejebo Seokjib and in 1759, the book was revised and published at the Muyesinbo (Hangul: 무예신보, Hanja: 武藝新譜).

In 1790, these two books formed the basis, together with other Korean, Chinese, and Japanese martial art manuals, of the richly illustrated Muyedobotongji (Hangul: 무예도보통지, Hanja: 武藝圖譜通志). The book does not refer to Taekkyon, but shows influences from Chinese and Japanese fighting systems. It deals mostly with armed combat like sword fighting, double-sword fighting, spear fighting, stick fighting, and so on.

== Indonesia ==
The Indonesian natives began to develop and formulate various style of combat and self-defence systems. Archaeological findings revealed that the origins of Pencak Silat dates back to the sixth century, to the times of the Srivijaya empire on Sumatra and also the 13th century Majapahit empire in East Java. Artifacts showed that this unique combat system had been used consistently through Indonesia’s history.

== Philippines ==
Filipino martial arts are considered hybrid systems which incorporates elements from both western and eastern martial arts. Its origins are Asian and come from a period wherein the various prehispanic Philippine states; Rajahnates, Kingdoms, Sultanates and Lakanates warred with each other, therefore producing a rich martial tradition with hundreds of schools as numerous as there are Filipino ethnic groups. It then incorporated Western elements when the Spaniards arrived from Mexico and they unified these prehispanic states unto one Filipino identity and thus, infused the Filipino martial arts with European styles of combat.

During the Spanish period, Chinese and Japanese converts

to Christianity who fled to the Philippines away from their homeland's persecution, also enriched Filipino martial arts with their own styles. The British Occupation of Manila (Launched from India) and the Moro Wars also shaped Filipino martial arts up to a certain extent. Although the martial arts fell into disuse during the artillery-intensive Philippine Revolution and Philippine–American War, it became practical again during the Japanese occupation especially to Guerillas.

== Vietnam ==
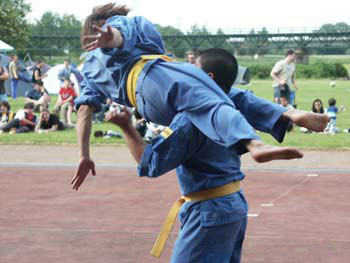
Flying scissors to the neck. The opponent is forced to the ground with a twist of the body.

Vietnamese martial arts are influenced by efforts to defend the country from foreign threats . The most influential in the country's martial arts is China with its thousand-year occupation of Vietnam. But through thousands of years of internal, civil strife: dynastic changes (dynasties), foreign conquests, warlordism and guerrilla tactics, the Vietnamese martial artists used what they learned from their neighbors and evolved a unique form of martial arts.

The martial arts were used by Vietnamese kings to train their troops and to defend the country against enemies. In addition to the army, family clans and Buddhist temples cultivated a variety of styles to defend themselves.
