= Pongyi thaing =

Burmese martial art

Pongyi Thaing
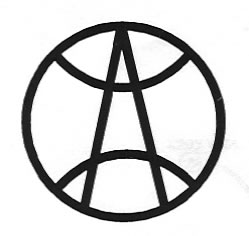

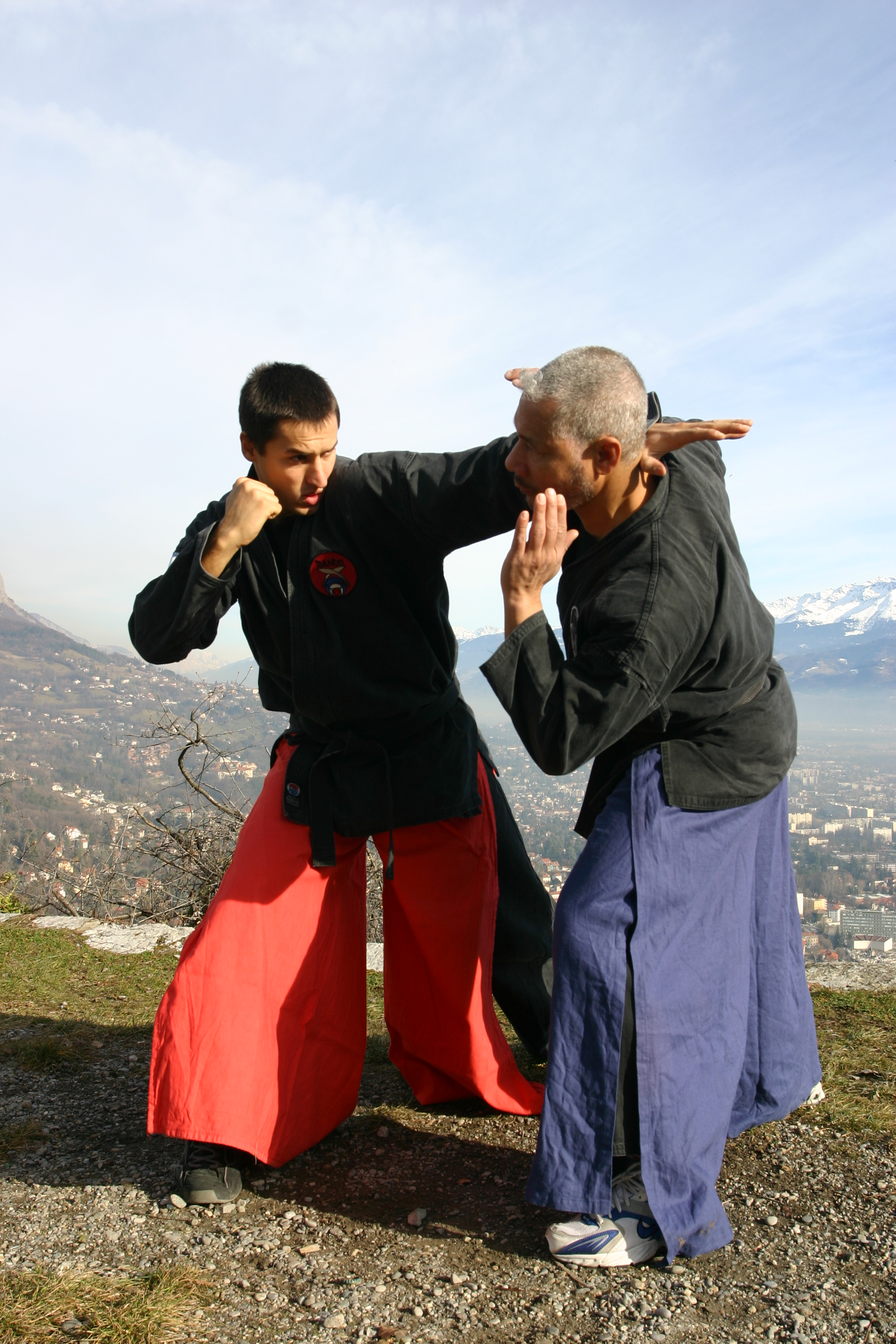
- Focus: Self-defense
- Country of origin: Myanmar
- Creator: Oopali
- Olympic sport: No
- Meaning: Monk martial art

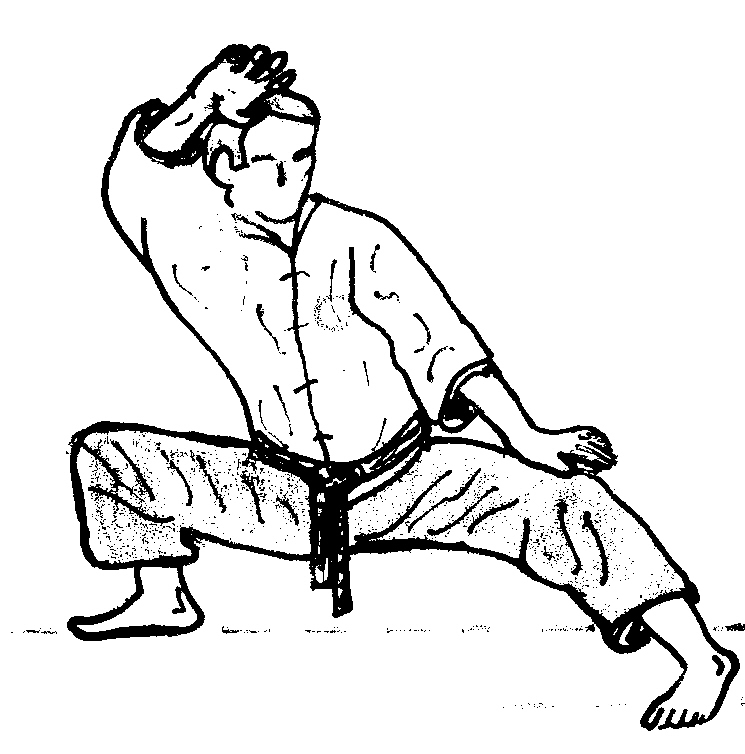

Pongyi thaing (Burmese: ဘုန်းကြီးသိုင်း [pʰóʊɰ̃dʑí θáɪɰ̃]), also known as the Bando Monk System, is a Burmese martial art created by the monk Oopali in the 9th century. Based on the Hindu-Buddhist principle of non-violence and non-aggression, its objective is not to cause maximum harm but simply to defend oneself. The word pongyi means monk and thaing is an umbrella term for Burmese martial arts.

Pongyi thaing is an integrated system of developing the body, mind and spirit to achieve harmony with oneself, with others and with nature. Style are generally determined by the level of emotional control during confrontation. Levels of emotional discipline determine the nature of action and reaction.

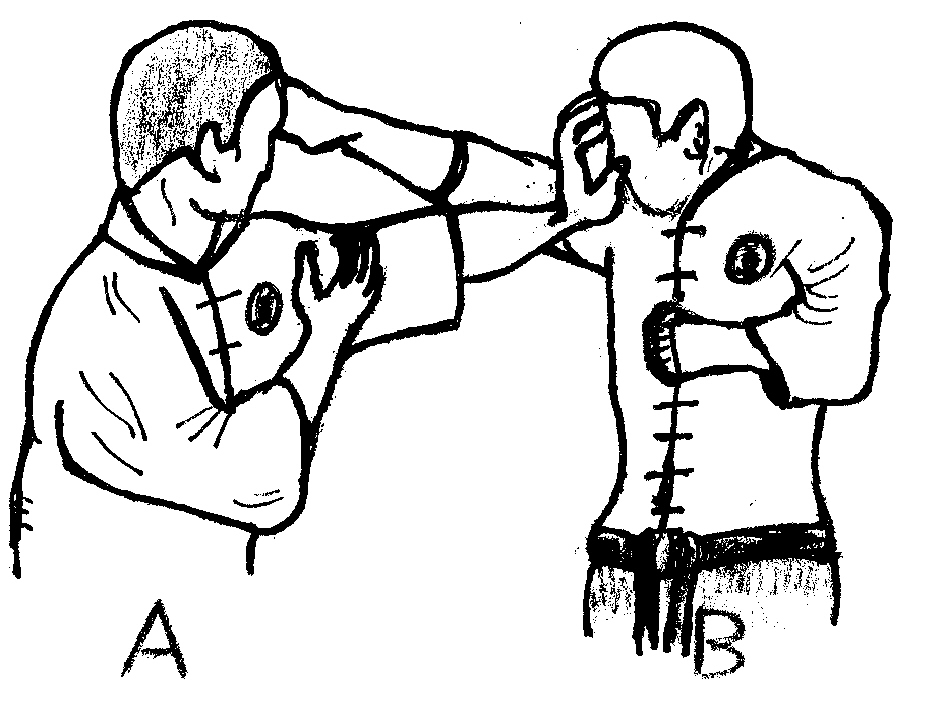

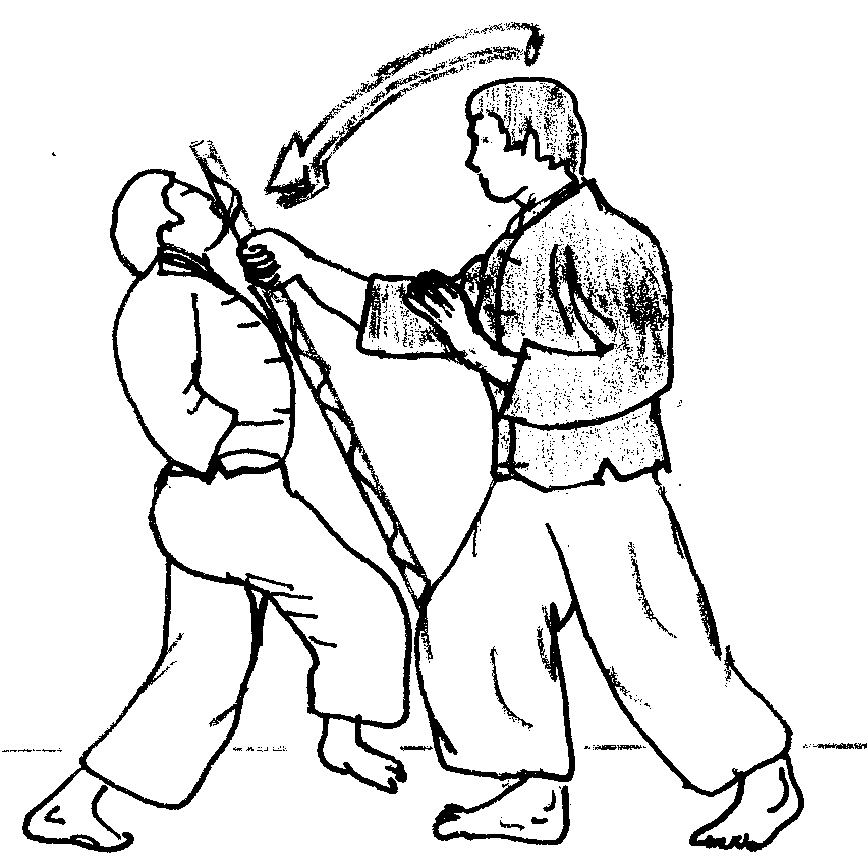

== See also ==
- Bando
- Banshay
- Lethwei
- Naban
