= Mak Yuree =

Mak Yuree এমএকে ইউরী
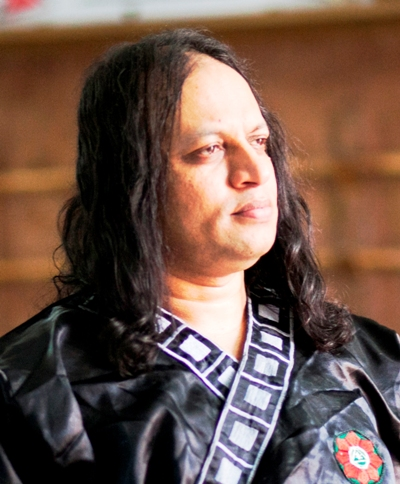
- Mak Yuree, in 2015.
- Born: 1964 (age 61–62); Dhaka, Bangladesh
- Other names: The Thunder Shin Man, Vajramunee
- Nationality: Bangladeshi
- Style: Butthan
- Rank: 7th degree black-belt in Bando; 10th degree black-belt in Butthan

Other information
- Website: vajramunee.org

Mak Yuree (Bengali: এমএকে ইউরী;born 1964) also known as Vajramunee, is the founder of Vajrapran and Butthan movement, the South Asian combat sports and system of personal development with the aim to obtain body-mind balance. He was selected and featured as one of the top five superhumans of the planet in the strength category by a team of scientists from the Discovery Channel in 2013. Yuree is cited as 'one of the world's most unique martial artists, a foremost authority in the field of mind training, meditation, motivational speaking and art of self-defense.' He is a Bangladeshi born Grandmaster, known for his extraordinary ability to engage highest percentage (96%) of muscles in the world through meditation. He is a 10th degree black belt holder and the President of the World Combat Self Defense Federation and Secretary General of International Butthan Federation. He went on to become the Grandmaster of the year 2007 at World Martial Arts Hall of Fame.

== Early life ==
Yuree, first of four children was born in 1964 in Dhaka, Bangladesh to Amina Alam and Shamsul Alam. His father Shamsul Alam was a writer and the chief engineer of Bangladesh Power Development Board. After his birth, Vajramunee was named Yuree after the name of the Soviet cosmonaut Yuri Gagarin, the first human to journey to the outer space. His early childhood education began in a British missionary school, Elizabeth Marble Primary School. When he was in fifth grade, he started a club on physical training with his fellow and junior friends. He started to learn Burmese Bando and Minzing (mind training system energy healing from Myanmar), later he was admitted in a military feeder institution, Jhenidah Cadet College and grew up in the midst of iron discipline and the regimental grooming.

== Superhuman ==
In 2013, Yuree Vajramunee was selected and featured as one of the top five Superhuman of this planet in the strength category by Discovery Channel for his outstanding shin kick ability to break three baseball bats in a bundle with one kick. His fourth world record is for the highest neuro-engagement ability in the world, proven during the scientific laboratory tests conducted by the team of experts and scientists. In 2012, the Discovery Channel was in search of people with extraordinary or superhuman abilities and started to feature selected people in their TV documentary series called Superhuman Showdown. Yuree was featured in the Ripley's Believe It or Not! for his shin kicking ability.

== Career ==
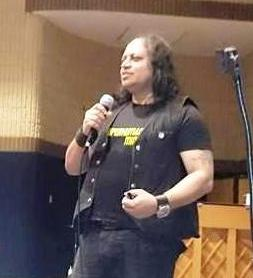
Mak Yuree delivering motivational speech in the Inspirational Seminar at Crossroads Middle School, New Jersey, USA.2015

He began his Martial Arts career with classical Burmese martial arts bando and banshay, at the age of 11. The enterprise is named as Global Executive Protection and Security Training Agency and he currently serves as its Director General. Yuree invented MY Baton, a new version of control device which has been used by security and law-enforcing agencies. He is an Instructor member of American Society of Law Enforcement Trainers (ASLET).

Yuree is leading the mission to revive the lost heritage of thousand years old Indian Sub-continental Martial Arts through a historical research work linking Kancheepuram and Shaolin Temple. He developed Butthan, a form of martial art and combat sport, rooted in ancient South Asia. As a combat sport, Butthan is practiced in different parts of the world under the International Butthan Federation. Yuree serves as the Secretary-General of International Butthan Federation.
