= Upali (given name) =

Upali or Upāli (Sinhala: උපාලි; Thai: อุบาลี) is a masculine given name. Notable people with the name include:

- Upāli, Indian monk and barber who was said to be one of the Buddha's ten chief disciples
- Upali, 9th century Burmese monk and creator of pongyi thaing
- Upali Batuwantudawe (fl. 1932–1956), Sri Lankan lawyer and politician
- Upali Gunaratne (born 1954), Sri Lankan politician
- Upali Kannangara (1951–2018), Sri Lankan musician
- Upali Kodituwakku (born 1964), Sri Lankan cricketer
- Upali Rajakaruna (born 1975), Sri Lankan wheelchair tennis player
- Upali Thera (fl. 1753), Sri Lankan Buddhist monk
- Upali Wijewardene (1938–1983), Sri Lankan businessman and entrepreneur
