= Butthan =

Bangladeshi martial art and combat sport

- ব্যুত্থান
- Logo of Butthan
- Focus: Hybrid
- Hardness: Both semi-contact
- Country of origin: Bangladesh
- Date of formation: 7th August, 1981
- Creator: Mak Yuree Vajramunee
- Ancestor arts: Varma kalai, Bando, Vajra-mushti, Chuan Fa
- Official website: International Butthan Federation

Butthan (ব্যুত্থান, bʊθɑːn, meaning "Defense with distinction and awakening") is a Bangladeshi martial art and combat sport. It is a system of self-defense and personal development rooted in South Asian heritage. Butthan has been developed by Mak Yuree, an internationally acclaimed Grandmaster and known as Superhuman as dubbed by the Discovery Channel. It has been described as the ‘noble art of stopping-fight and enlightenment that produces physical, mental and spiritual balance’. Butthan was approved as a national sport of Bangladesh by the National Sports Council, Ministry of Youth and Sports in Bangladesh in 2013. As a combat sport, the martial art is practiced in different parts of the world under the International Butthan Federation.

== History ==
The word Butthan is a Sanskrit word, meaning upliftment or defense with distinction. Butthan, as a form of martial art rooted in ancient South Asia, was founded by Grandmaster Mak Yuree. The Pashupati seal was found as the world's oldest evidence of body-mind training in the archeological site of Mohenjo-daro. The systematic form of martial art was developed in ancient India. Indian monk Bodhidharma traveled from Kanchipuram to Shaolin Temple in 520 AD. The systematic forms of self-defenses were later nourished at Shaolin Monastery. Bodhidharma introduced rich psycho-physical training to the Shaolin monks which was vital in strengthening the internal and external organs. However, over the centuries the Indus valley civilization lost its heritage as the thriving ground for martial arts. After two and half millennia, Mak Yuree Vajramuneethe, with his research and development, created an international movement to revive that heritage of martial arts under the flag of Butthan.

The practice of Butthan began in 1981 in the Bangladeshi city of Rajshahi. In 1985, under the guidance of Mak Yuree, the first national-level Butthan competition in Bangladesh took place at Rajshahi Government College. Butthan evolved through Mak Yuree's accomplishment in forty different Martial arts styles and progressive research and development. Butthan was spread across Bangladesh with the formation of training camps in different districts of the country. At the beginning of 1990s, Butthan was adopted by different law-enforcement and security organizations in Bangladesh, such as the Special Security Force, National Security Intelligence, Army, Police, RAB, Coast Guard, and United Nations Peace Keeping Force as a way to train their law enforcement personnel. In 1991, Burmese Grandmaster Khing Maung Gyi presented a successorship document containing the overview of Bando, a Burmese form of martial art, in Dhaka. At the ceremony, Butthan was showcased by Bangladeshi martial artists. The event was publicized through mainstream media. In 1992, American army official Frank White took the initiative to spread Butthan beyond the map of Bangladesh. In 1994, Butthan was introduced as mandatory physical training in all the cadet colleges in Bangladesh. Andy Scott, a trainer at the National Security Academy of Texas, USA, supported the spread of the martial art in the USA. In an effort to spread Butthan around the world, World Butthan Federation was formed in 1998 in Houston, United States. The organization was renamed to International Butthan Federation in 2002 in a conference attended by Butthan trainers and advisors in England. International Butthan Federation promotes the martial art in South East Asia, Europe and the United States. Myanmar Thaing Federation, in 2004, honored the founder of Butthan Mak Yuree in a reception, which was attended by 32 Grandmasters of the country. In the reception, Myanmar proclaimed its solidarity with the global Butthan movement.

Mak Yuree traveled to Swindon, England in 2005 in the pursuit of spreading Butthan. The mayor of Swindon, Steve Wakefield received training of Butthan and helped in the promotion of Butthan. In 2007, World Martial Arts Hall of Fame recognized Mak Yuree as the ‘Grandmaster of the Year’. Combat, a magazine on martial art from United Kingdom, published a cover story based on Mak Yuree, which helped Butthan to garner attention globally in martial arts circle. The then editor of the magazine, Paul Cliffton sincerely supported the publicity and spread of Butthan. Furthermore, Darique Montaut, a politician of Swindon, actively supported the spread of Butthan in England. In 2010, International Butthan Federation participated with promotional stall in the International Martial Art Exhibition held at the National Exhibition Centre in Birmingham, England. Butthan was approved as a national sport by the National Sports Council, Ministry of Youth and Sports in Bangladesh in 2013. In 2015, Martial Art Illustrator published its cover story based on Butthan. Brunei Darussalam government officially approved practice of Butthan nationally in their country in April, 2018.

== Philosophy and overview ==
Butthan, as a form of martial art, is a realistic system of self-defense, personal development and modern form of safe sport with South Asian heritage. It aims to transform the human body through balance of physical, mental, emotional and spiritual spheres and thereby attaining self-mastery and beyond. Butthan characterizes 'Co-competition' system to depict the non-aggressive, cooperation-based path of empowerment. The sport is based on cooperation, empathy, personal development and positive motivation. Butthan emphasizes mindfulness training and conscious use of mind to activate the physical movement, thereby maximizing the efficiency and delivery of power which is known as Mon-Chala. The practice of the martial art produces balance through a process of inculcating self-discipline and pragmatic restructuring of personal habits known as Vaz-Sodhon.

Butthan also uniquely stages a mental test as a part of the tournament rules to ensure the quality of participants’ mental and physical prowess equally which is called Jhalak Khela. The system of Butthan has the essence of knowledge and scientific principles of psychology, trigonometry, human anatomy, physiology, logic, human nervous system, Vajrapran, Siddha medical knowledge blended with selected self-defense methods combining the arts such as Bando, Vajra-mushti, Varma kalai, Tibetan and Chinese Kempo, Min Zing, Banshay, Lathi khela and other selected strategies of the, Burmese and Tibetan unarmed and weapons systems.
