= Bando yoga =

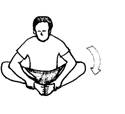

Bando yoga or Burmese yoga is a form of yoga from Myanmar usually taught alongside bando. It is probably based on the internal training of Indian martial arts and is often referred to as peasant or slave yoga. It was for the common man and also used by ancient warriors of northern Burma to maintain health and protect from illness and disease. Today it is practiced by ethnic Burmese in parts of Southeast Asia, India.

Bando really spread in Burma when Japanese invaded the country in 1942. It is part of a collection of martial arts called Thaing.

The discipline includes the fighting and defensive behaviors of animals such as the cobra, python, viper, tiger, leopard, monkey, bull, boar and scorpion.

Bando yoga is used for three main purposes. These are for maintaining overall health, resisting illness and disease, and restoring or recovering from illness and injury. It is not a yoga system for enlightenment but for developing and maintaining efficient functionality in our everyday life, whether it be as a worker/laborer, monk or warrior.

There are three systems of Burmese yoga:

1. dhanda yoga (decreased flexibility by using the staff)
2. lonji yoga (Development of flexibility by using cloth or rope)
3. letha yoga (Partner-assisted improvement of circulation and stimulation of joints)
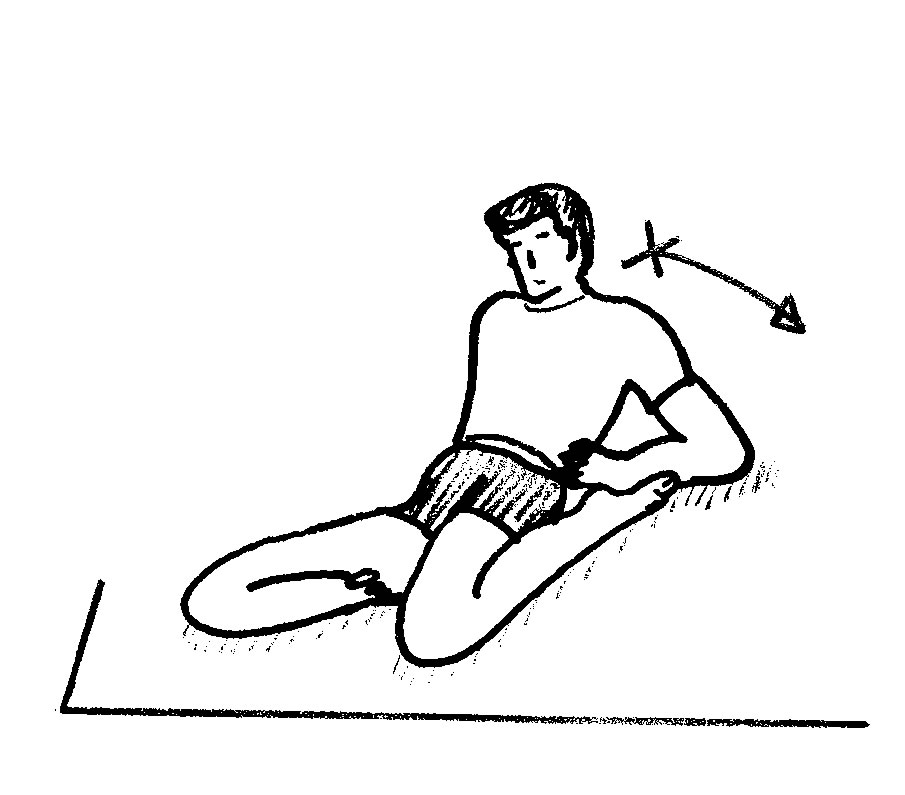
Leg stretch

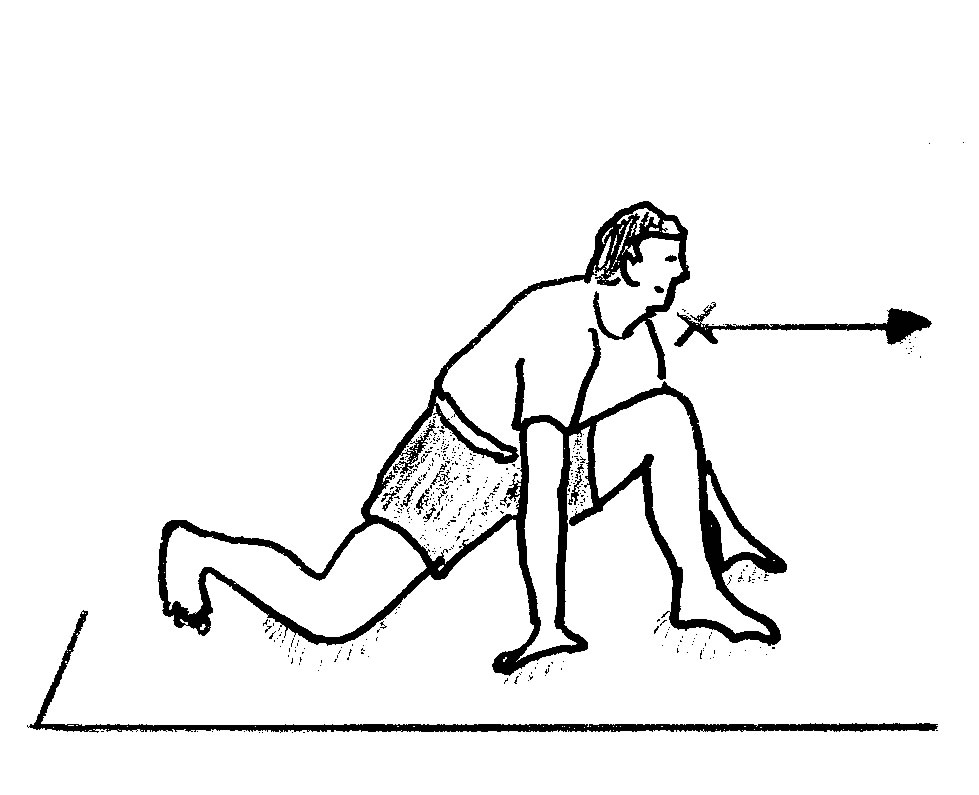
Leg Stretch

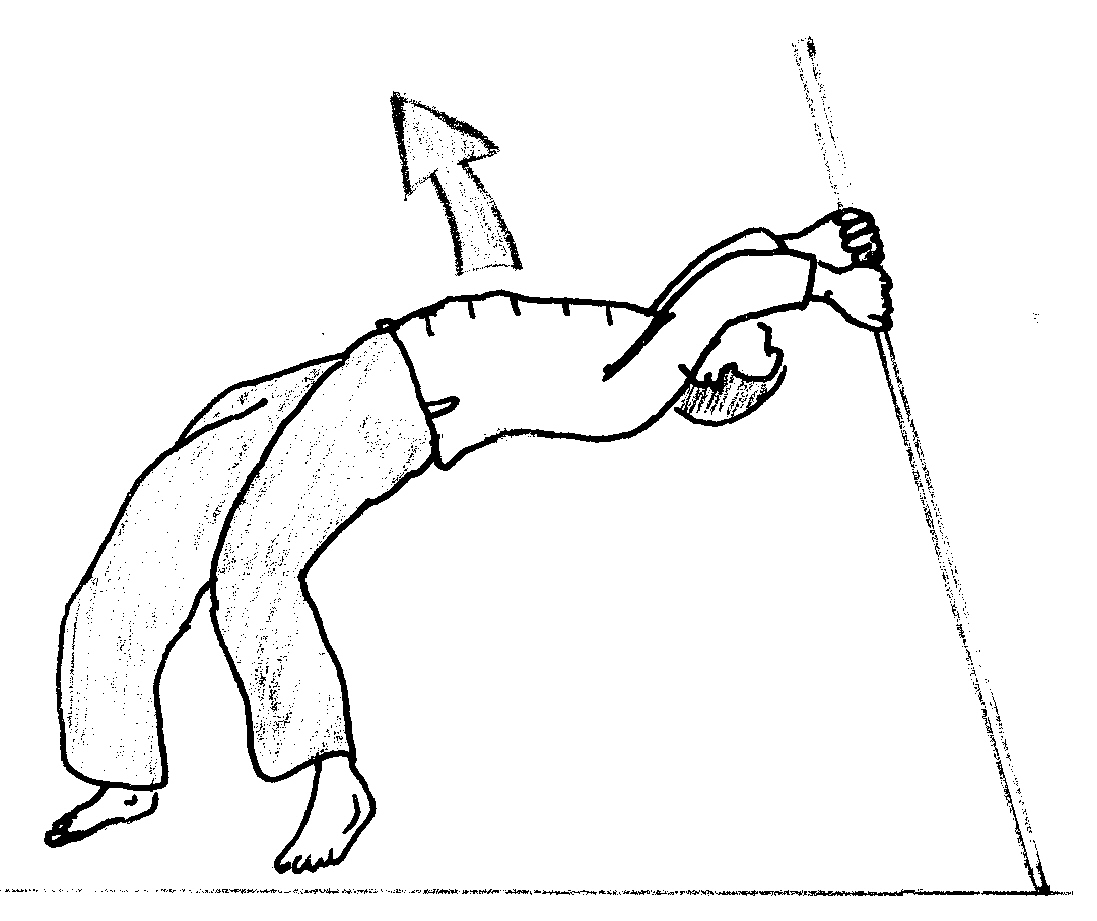
Stretch of Dhanda yoga

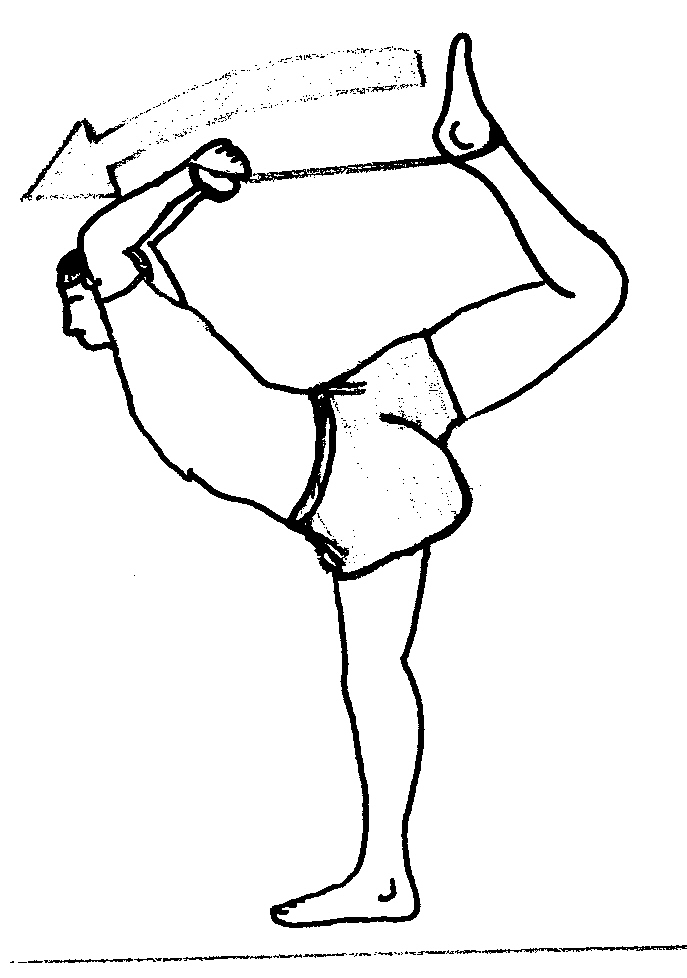
Stretch of Longyi yoga

== See also ==
- Bando
- Yoga
