= Oopali =

Oopali or Upali was a 9th-century Burmese monk who is credited with founding pongyi thaing, also known as the Bando Monk System, and establishing a Buddhist order. His order still exists today in Myanmar, Thailand, Cambodia and Laos but his fighting art disappeared. During the 19th century, the elder abbots Mogak Sayadaw, Mandalay Sayadaw, Mingun Sayadaw, Shwelbo Sayadaw and Anapura Sayadaw were the only monks who continued to teach the system in northern Burma.
