= Mainland Southeast Asia martial arts =

The traditional martial arts of the Mainland Southeast Asia are related to one another, and as a group to Indian martial arts. The most salient common feature is Mainland Southeast Asia kickboxing. The region of Mainland Southeast Asia is believed to be the land of Suvarnabhumi that ancient Indians mentioned in Buddhist text and Hindu text. In 790 A.D., a Khmer prince who grew up abroad by the name of Jayavarman II returned to unify the Khmer civilization. In 802 A.D., Jayavarman II established the Khmer Empire, the precursor to modern Cambodia, and declared himself the Chakravatin (universal ruler). Around 850 A.D., Pagan, the ancestor of modern-day Burma, was established by Tibeto-Burman speakers. For 200 years, Pagan remained a small principality until the reign of King Anawrahta. In 1238 A.D., Thailand's first state, Sukhothai, was started when the residents declared independence from the Khmer Empire. In 1353 A.D., Laos's first state, Lan Xang, was started by Fa Ngum with the assistance of the Khmer from Angkor.

== Myanmar ==
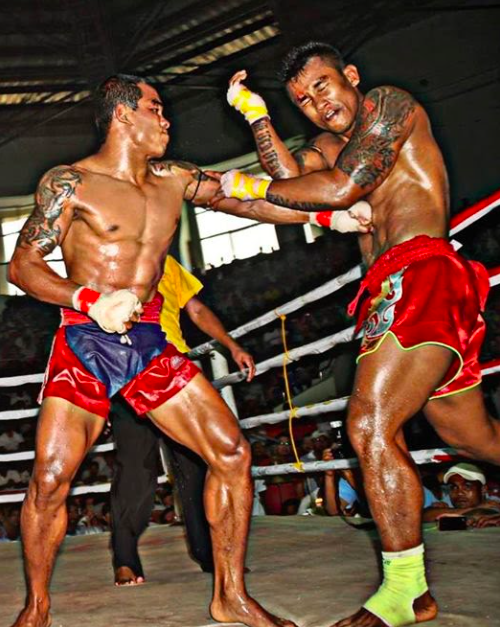
Lethwei fight

Thaing (Burmese: သိုင်း, pronounced [θáiɰ̃]) is a Burmese term used to classify the traditional martial systems of Myanmar. There are three main generation of Thaing in Myanmar, named "Kanbawza" "Inwa" and "Yamanya". Burmese martial arts include bando, banshay, naban, shan gyi and Lethwei:

Lethwei or Burmese boxing. A traditional style of striking with headbutts, kicks, punches, knee and elbow strikes.

Naban is the traditional form of wrestling from Myanmar. Originally based on Indian wrestling, it is practiced primarily in rural areas. Naban is especially popular among the Himalayan tribes. The Chin and Kachin people are both known for their skilled wrestlers. Techniques include joint locks, strikes to pressure points, and chokeholds.

== Cambodia ==
Bokator is an ancient Cambodian martial art with roots in the 1st century. It prioritises physical and mental development through strength, discipline, and a commitment to non-violence. It combines physical combat techniques with a strong focus on mental discipline rooted in respect for nature and societal values. Masters, some believed to possess special healing and protective abilities, guide apprentices in understanding their roles and responsibilities, ultimately preparing them to safeguard communities, the environment, and advocate for justice and peace. Bokator remains an integral part of Cambodian culture, not only as a martial art but also in rituals dedicated to local deities and festive events. These occasions often incorporate traditional elements like dance, music, and traditional medicine. Bokator symbolises Cambodia's cultural, social, and religious values and enjoys a broad following across age, gender, education, and social status.

Kun Khmer or Pradal Serey is an unarmed martial art from Cambodia. In Khmer the word pradal means fighting or boxing and serey means free. Originally used for warfare, pradal serey is now one of Cambodia's national sports. Its moves have been slightly altered to comply with the modern rules. The martial art was turned into a sport when French colonists arrived and added components of Western boxing such as a boxing ring, boxing gloves, weight classes and timed rounds.

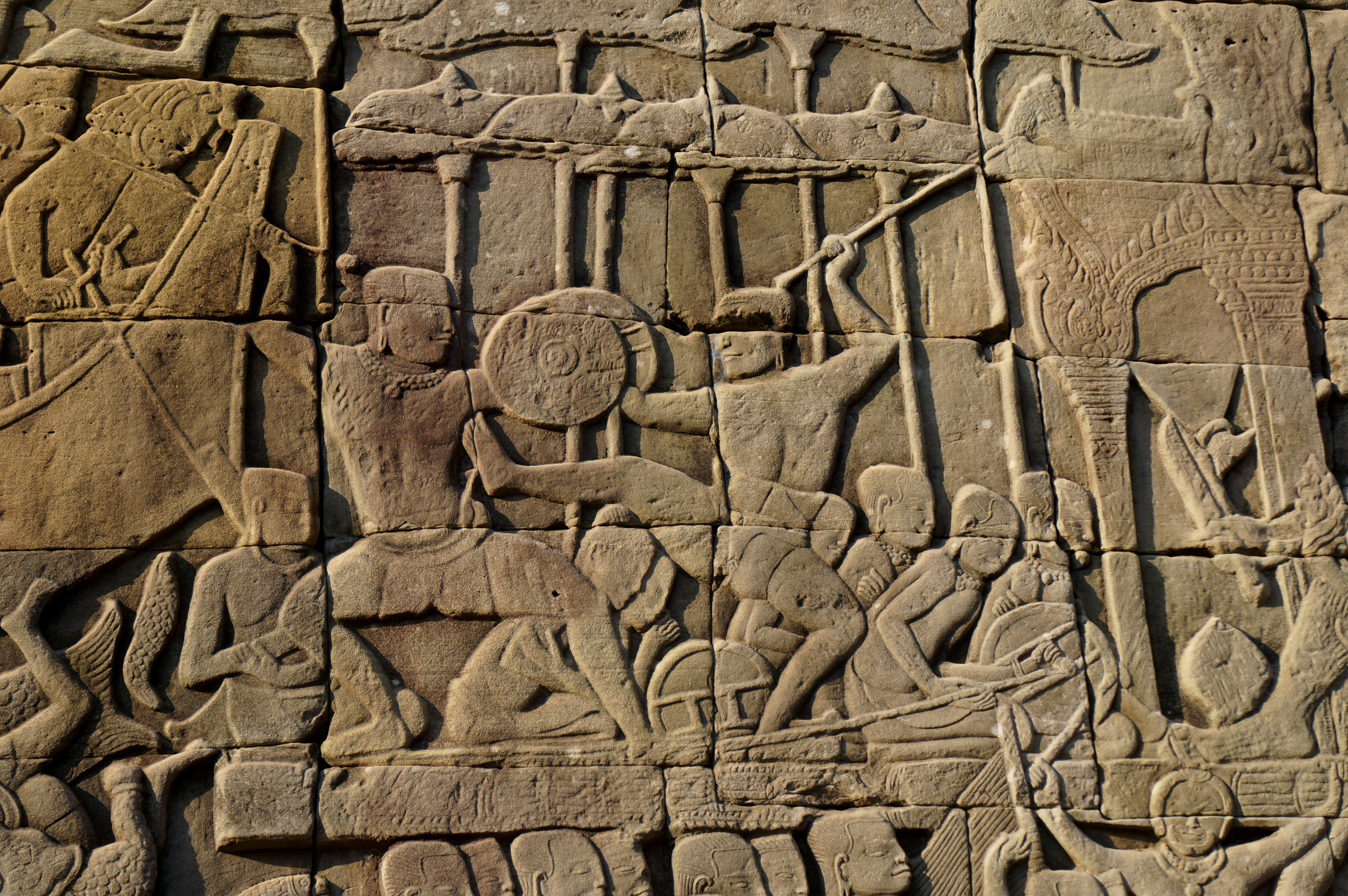
800 year old Cambodian stone carving of thrust kick. The thrust kick is a staple of modern pradal serey.

Khmer traditional wrestling is a folk wrestling style from Cambodia. It has been practiced as far back as the Angkor period and is depicted on the bas-reliefs of certain temples. The earliest form of Khmer traditional wrestling was called Maloyuth. Maloyuth was created in 788 A.D. by Brahmin Timu. It evolved to the current form of wrestling, Cham Bab, in the 8th century. Although predominantly a male sport today, Khmer wrestling was once practiced by both sexes as female wrestlers are also displayed on the Banteay Srei temple.

== Laos ==
Muay Lao is a traditional unarmed martial art from Laos. It incorporates punches, kicks, elbows and knee strikes. Muay Lao was an event at the 2009 Southeast Asian Games in Vientiane.

== Malaysia ==
Tomoi is an unarmed martial art from Malaysia. It is practiced mainly in the northern states such as Kedah, Trengganu, and especially Kelantan.

== Thailand ==
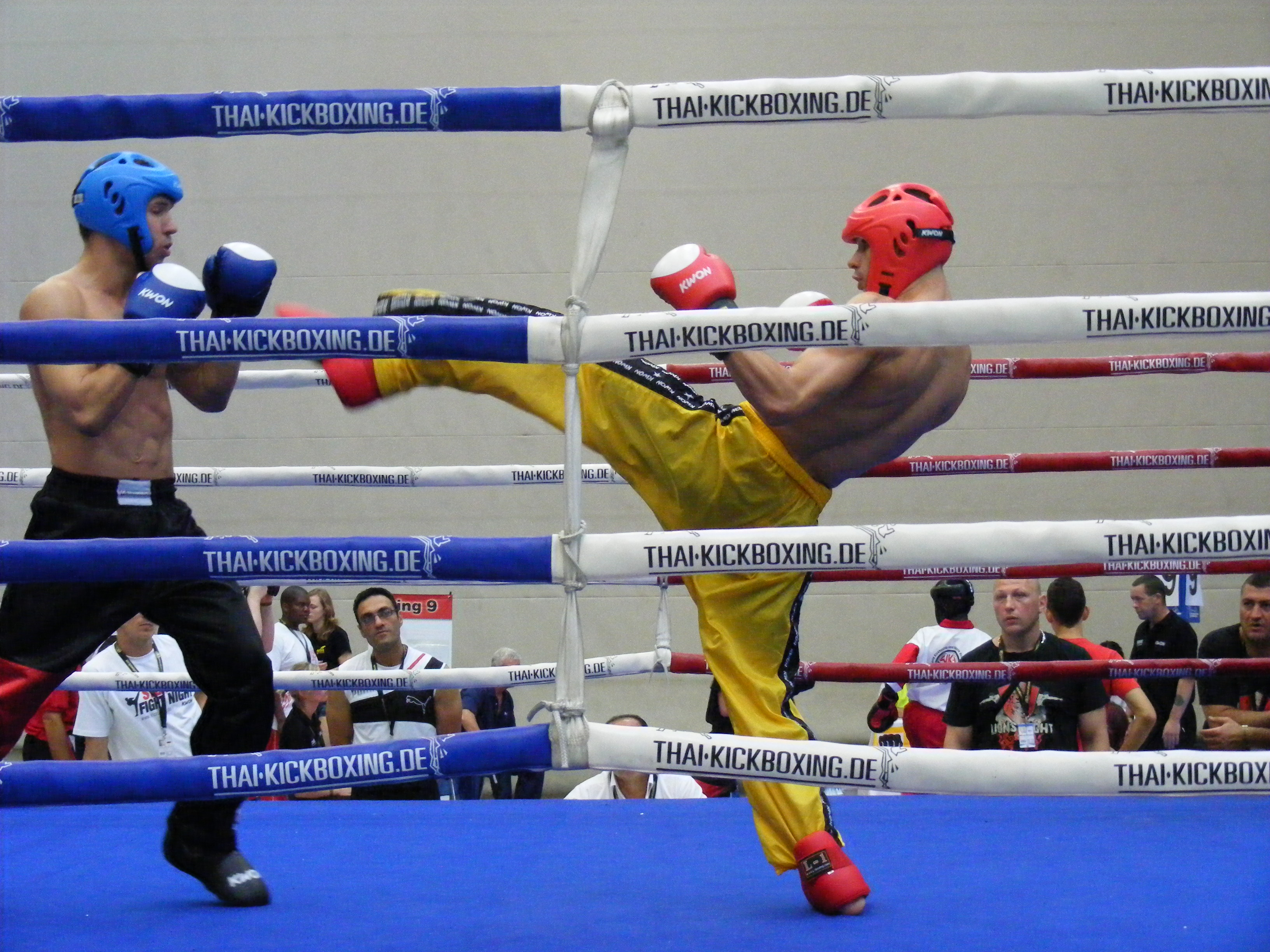
Muay Thai Foot-thrust (Thip)

Muay Boran (Thai: มวยโบราณ, RTGS: muai boran, pronounced [mūa̯j bōːrāːn]; lit. 'ancient boxing') is an umbrella term for the unarmed martial arts of Thailand prior to the introduction of modern equipment and rules in the 1930s. It is the predecessor of modern Muay Thai or Thai boxing.

Muay Thai (Thai: มวยไทย, RTGS: muai thai, pronounced [mūa̯j thāj]; lit. 'Thai boxing') is the Thai style of striking with strong emphasis on kicks, punches, knee and elbow strikes.

Krabi-Krabong (Thai: กระบี่กระบอง, pronounced [krā.bìː krā.bɔ̄ːŋ]) is a Thai weapon-based martial art. Krabi-krabong was developed by the ancient Siamese warriors for fighting on the battlefield. It was likely used in conjunction with muay boran but whether the two arts were developed together or independently is uncertain. Early warfare in Indochina was mostly between rival kingdoms and were fought en masse. Individual fighters were armoured and carried rhino hide shields. The system's name refers to its main weapons, namely the Thai sword (krabi) and staff (krabong). Typically, two swords (daab song mue) are wielded as a pair. Unarmed krabi-krabong (muay boran) makes use of kicks, pressure point strikes, joint locks, holds, and throws.

== Vietnam ==
Traditional Vietnamese martial arts (Võ Thuật Cổ Truyền Việt Nam 武術古傳越南) can be loosely divided into those of the Sino-Vietnamese descended from the Han, and those of the Chams or indigenous Vietnamese. Qwan Ki Do and Vovinam are prominent modern Vietnamese martial arts.
