= Maung Gyi =

Burmese martial artist

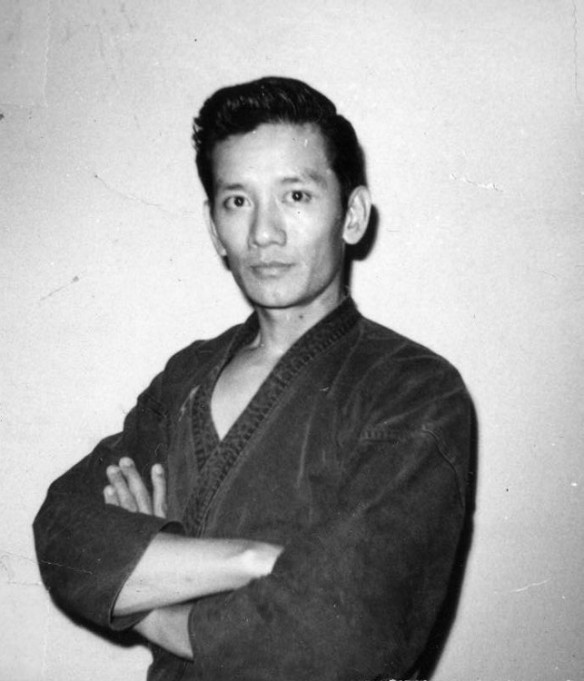
- young Maung Gyi
- Born: 1936 (age 89–90); Burma
- Style: Bando

Other information
- Spouse: Patricia Gyi
- Children: Serena Gyi and Melinda White

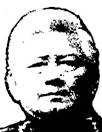
Maung Gyi, 1990s

Maung Gyi (Burmese: မောင်ကြီး) is a Burmese martial artist who is known for introducing Bando into the United States. He is the chief instructor for the American Bando Association.

== Biography ==
Maung Gyi was born in 1936. He father was Ba Than (Gyi). He was the Director of Physical Education and Sports in the Ministry of Education in Burma.

In the early 1960s, Maung Gyi formally began teaching Burmese Bando at American University in Washington D.C. He coached the American Eagles men's soccer team in 1965.

In 1966, Gyi established the American Bando Association (ABA) in Athens, Ohio. In recent years, Gyi has worked to promote modern Burmese Bando and to be accepted into the expanding community of Asian martial arts in the United States.

Gyi is a scholar of international law, psycholinguistics, and communications. Gyi was a professor at Ohio University in Athens, Ohio. While at Ohio University, he taught Cross Cultural Communications, was interim Soccer Coach and served as boxing coach for the OU Boxing Club.

== See also ==
- American Bando Association
- Hanthawaddy bando system
