= Banshay =

Weapon-based martial art

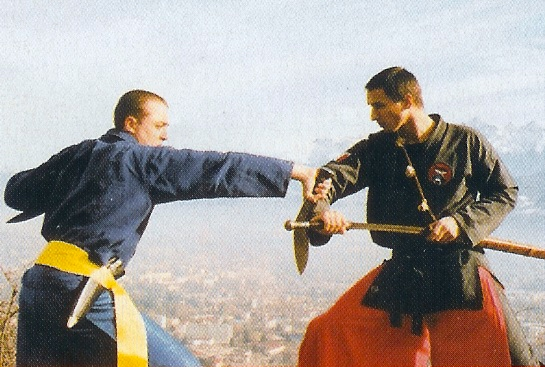
- Focus: Weaponry
- Country of origin: Myanmar
- Famous practitioners: Maung Gyi
- Olympic sport: No

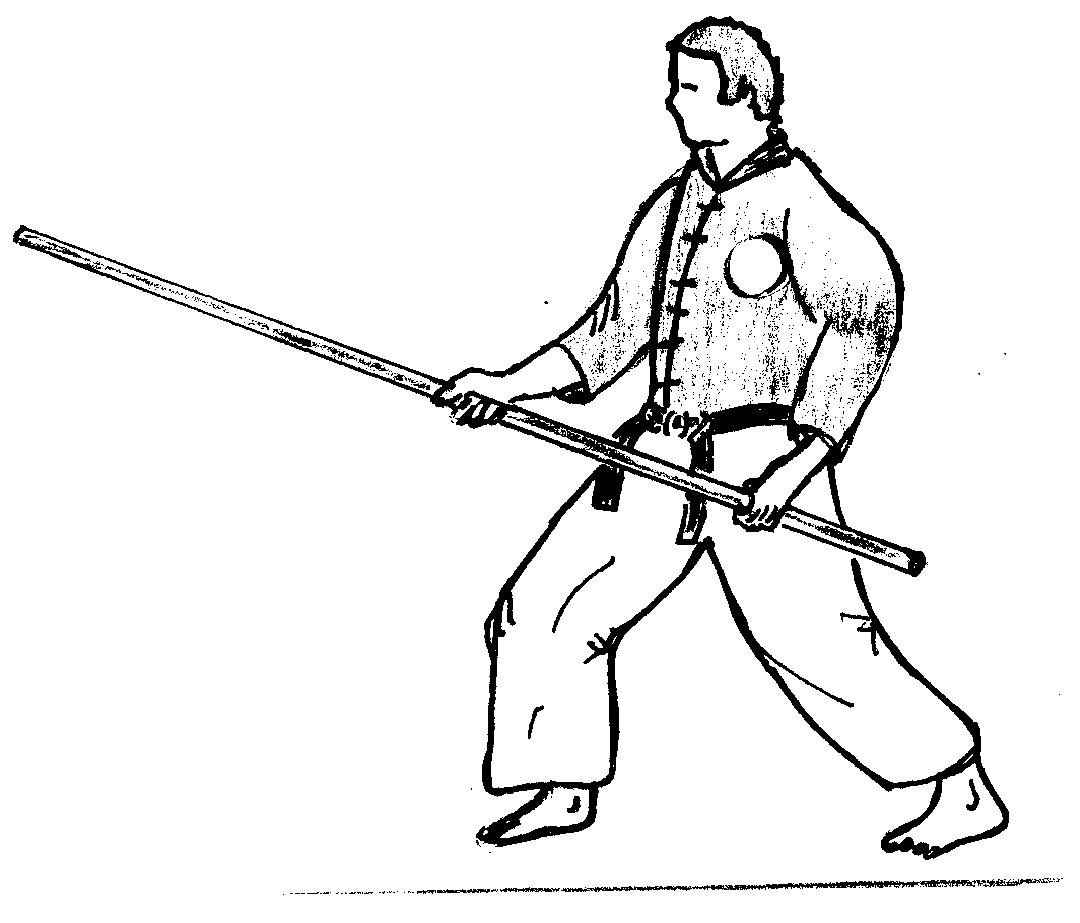

Banshay (Burmese: ဗန်ရှည်, pronounced [bàɰ̃ʃè]) is a weapon-based martial art from Myanmar focusing primarily on the sword, staff and spear. Influenced by both Indian and Chinese sources, it is closely related to similar Southeast Asian systems such as Thai krabi krabong, Cambodian kbach kun boran and Malay silat.

Banshay makes extensive use of the dha (sword) in pairs. Sword-fencing demonstrations and performances often begin with a pre-fight war dance in which the swordsman spins one or two swords very close to the body without cutting himself.

There are 37 sword forms. Sword training is conducted with the weapon still sheathed. Traditionally when a master first presents the student with a sword, the scabbard would be fixed so that the trainee is discouraged from killing opponents. Under extreme conditions when the sword must be unsheathed, the scabbard may be broken with a rock or other object.

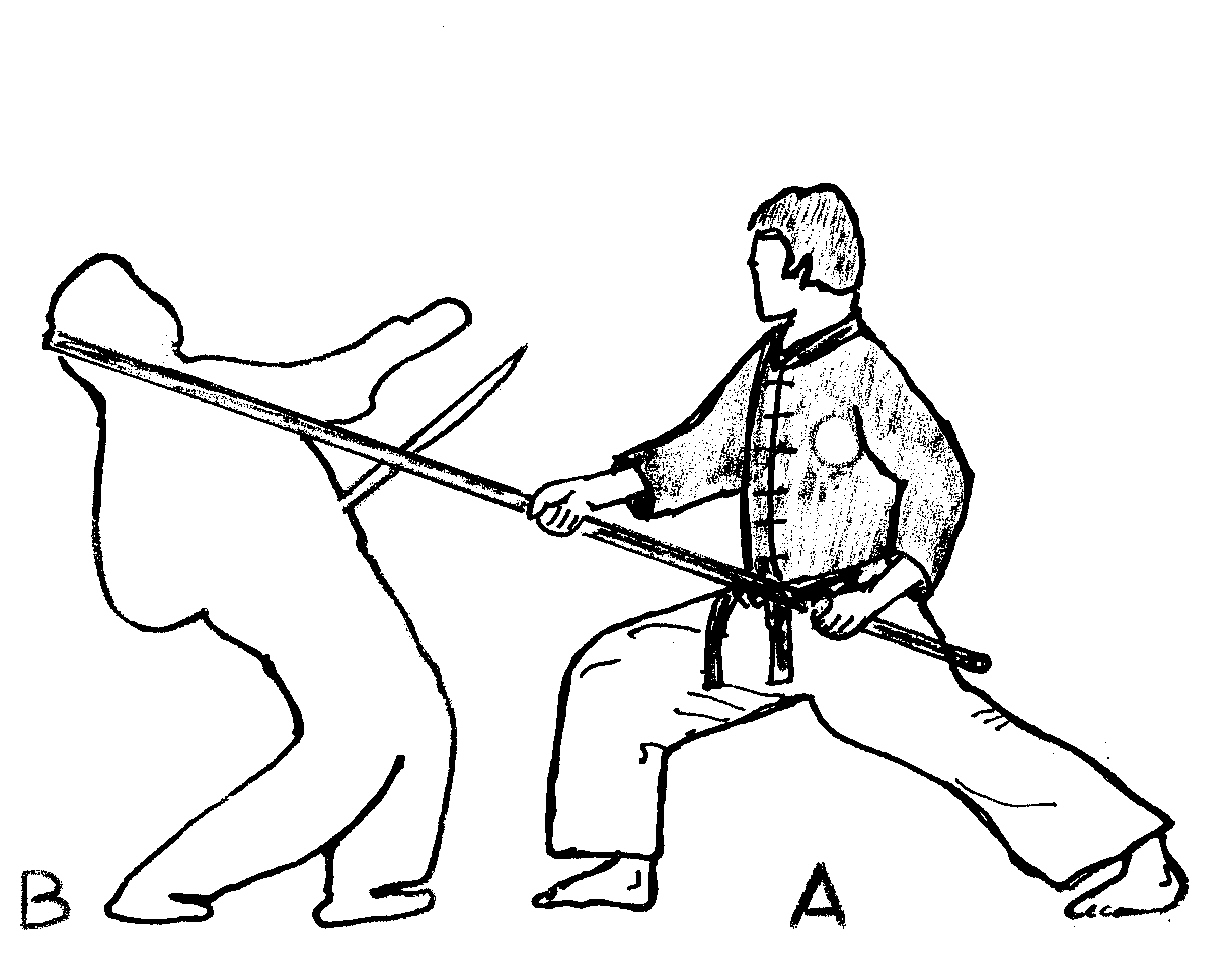
Defense with the staff

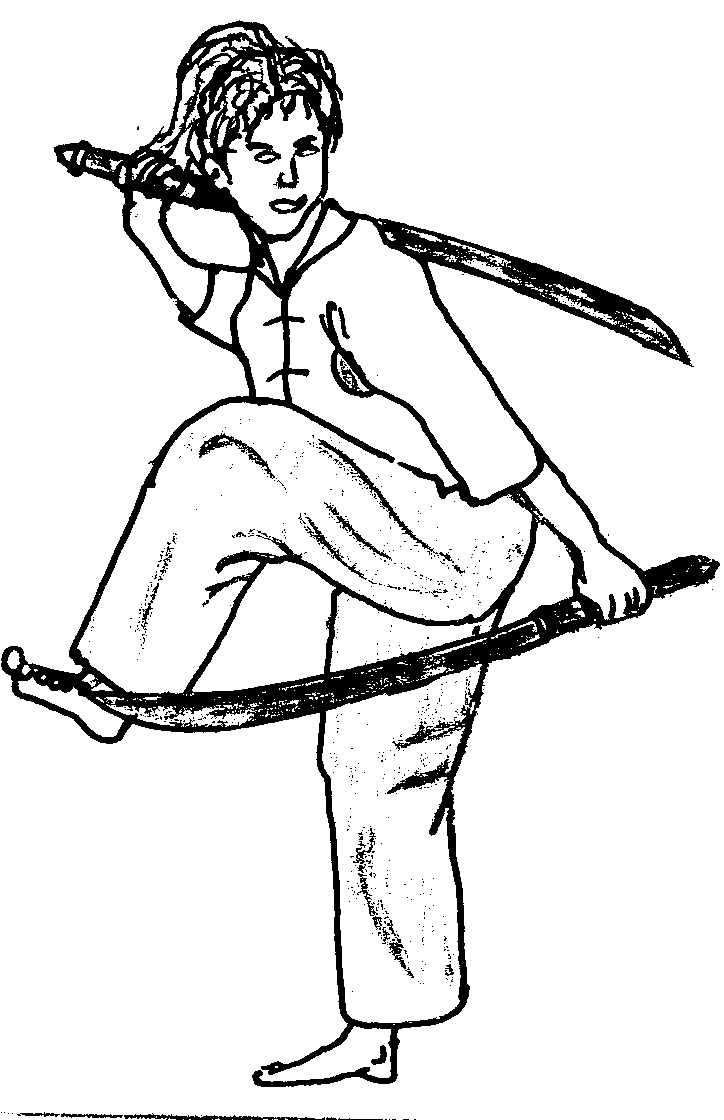
The panther dance

== See also ==
- Angampora
- Bataireacht
- Bōjutsu
- Butthan
- Gatka
- Jūkendō
- Kalaripayattu
- Kendo
- Kenjutsu
- Krabi–krabong
- Kuttu Varisai
- Mardani khel
- Silambam
- Silambam Asia
- Tahtib
- Thang-ta
- Varma kalai
- World Silambam Association
- Bando
- Lethwei
- Naban
- Kbachkun boraan
