= Naban =

Traditional form of grappling from Myanmar

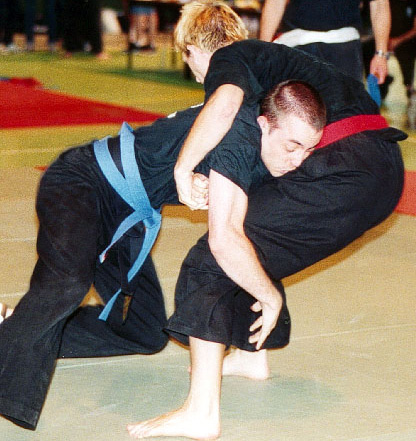
- Focus: Grappling
- Country of origin: Myanmar
- Parenthood: Malla-yuddha
- Olympic sport: No

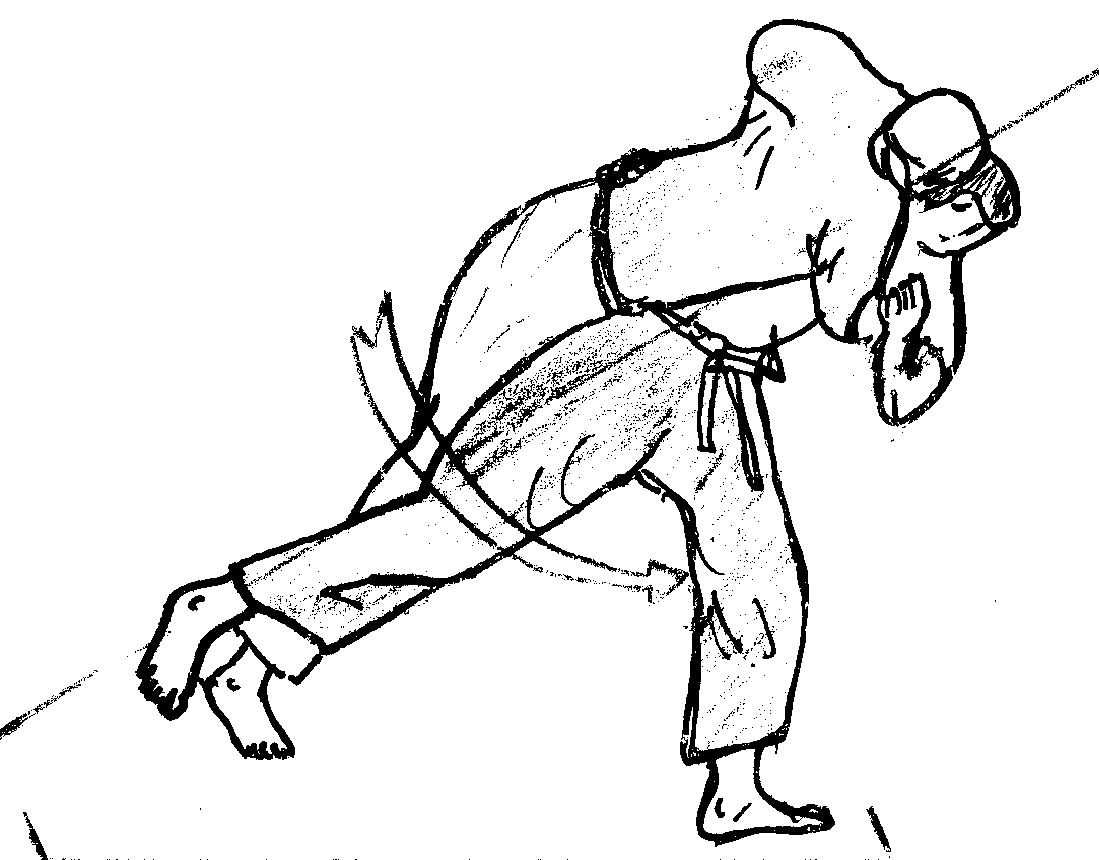

Naban (Burmese: နပန်း, pronounced [nəbáɰ̃]) is a traditional form of grappling from Myanmar. Naban is integrated into other fighting styles instead of existing as a separate martial art. Originally based on Indian wrestling, it is practiced primarily in rural areas. Naban is especially popular among the Kachin and Chin people who have Himalayan origins. Techniques include joint locks, strikes to pressure points, palm strikes, foot strikes and chokeholds. All parts of the opponent's body are legal targets.

== See also ==
- Bando
- Banshay
- Lethwei
- Khmer traditional wrestling
- Kyin
- Malla-yuddha
