= Bando =

Burmese martial art

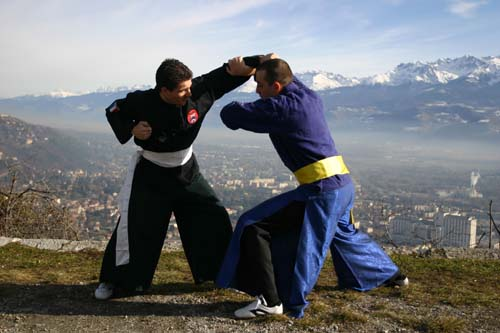
- Also known as: Bando thaing
- Focus: Combat
- Country of origin: Myanmar
- Olympic sport: No

Bando (Burmese: ဗန်တို, pronounced [bàɰ̃dò]) is a defensive unarmed martial art from Myanmar. Bando is sometimes mistakenly used as a generic word for all Burmese martial arts, but it is only one martial art; Burmese fighting systems collectively are referred to as thaing.

== Training ==
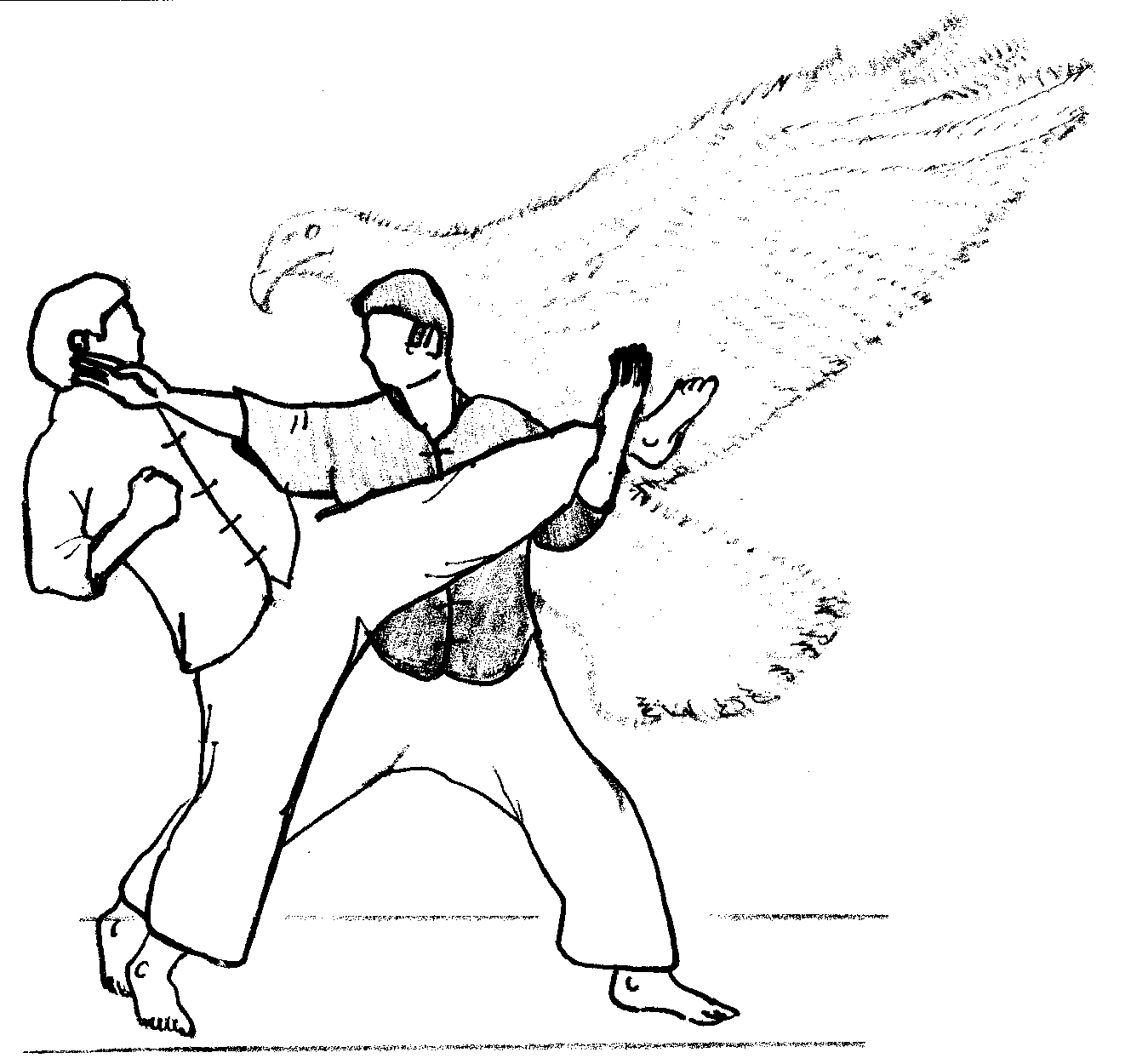
Eagle style

As with most Asian martial arts, bando schools start off by teaching the basic stances and footwork. This preliminary stage of training traditionally lasts for several months, although many instructors today avoid doing so. In the second stage of training, a series of blocking and parrying techniques is taught. Bando prioritises defense over offense so that the student will be able to protect themselves should the need arise. The defensive approach is also meant to discourage aggression and teach students to apply their skills with care. Offensive moves are taught in the third stage.

Most of bando's techniques are taught through forms or aka. Aka are first practiced solo, before the student progresses to partnered sets performed with two or more partners. The final stage is that of applying the techniques in contests, much like free sparring.

== Techniques ==
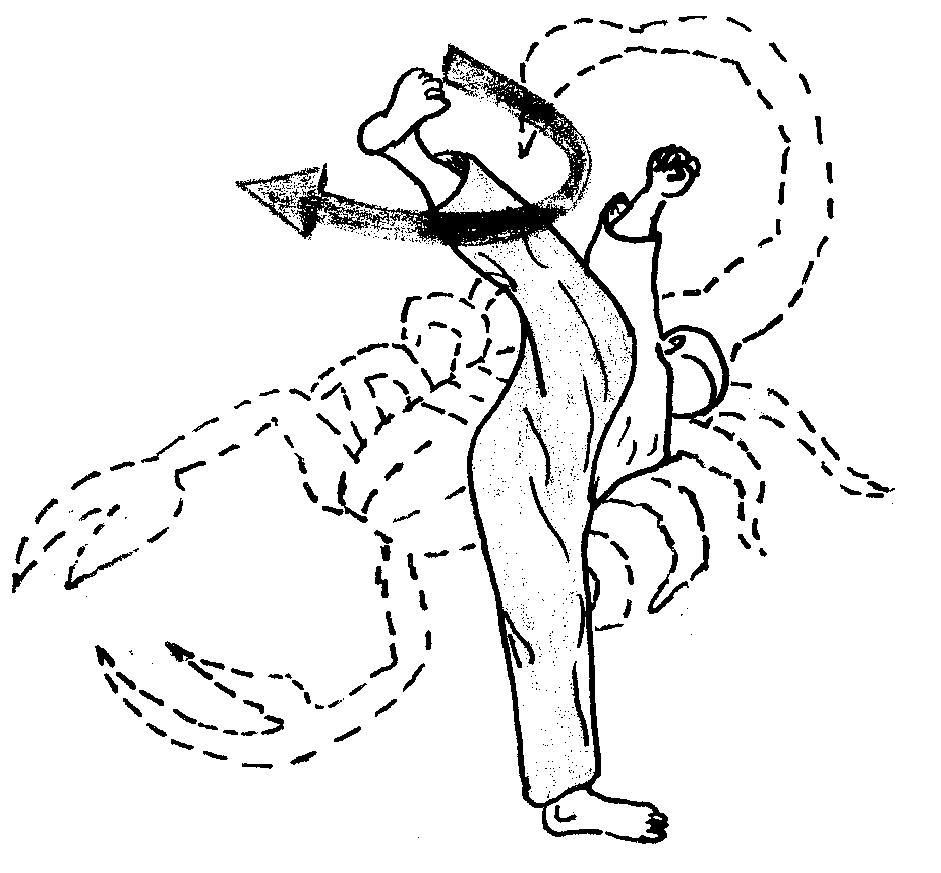
Scorpion kick

Bando emphasises defense as the best offense by leaving the initiative to the opponent and relying heavily on counter-maneuvers. Once the threat has been evaluated it is possible to respond with an appropriate counter, so too is destroying the opponent's weapon. If the adversary's hand or foot is broken, for example, the conflict is effectively ended. Typically, a bando exponent will first withdraw before beginning the counter-strike followed by grappling or locking. The head, shoulder, elbow, knee, and foot are all used for offensive purposes. Close-quarter combat is favoured.

Offensive forms in bando are based on the movements of animals, probably through the influence of animal styles from India and China. The moves and attitude in each pattern are characterised by the animal which they imitate. The highest form, as in Indian Śastravidyā, is the panther which combines all the previous forms.

Animal form	Characteristic
Boar	Rushing attacks, especially with the elbows and knees
Bull	Charging strikes and tackling
Cobra	Attacks to the upper vital points
Deer	Short leaps used to jump away from an attacker
Eagle	Striking and blocking with both hands
Monkey	Agile movements
Heron	Fast arm movements and short jumps
Leopard	Circling around, leaping at and tearing at opponents
Python	Chokes and locks
Scorpion	Pinching and seizing nerve centres
Tiger	Clawing attacks
Viper	Attacks to the lower vital points
Black panther	Taught by some teachers as a combination of all the animal forms

== The International Bando Association ==
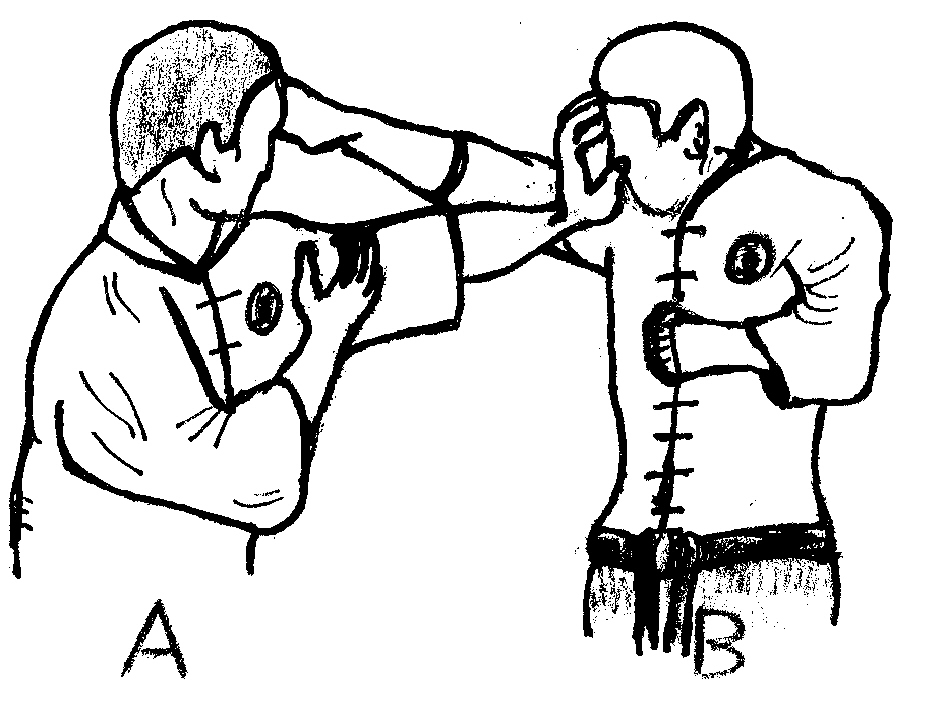
Tiger style

After WWII, Ba Than (Gyi), then director of physical education and athletics for the Union of Burma, tried to combine the techniques from the different bando styles and modernize them by founding a new Hanthawaddy bando system. Donn F. Draeger describes the organisation's founding as follows:

In 1933 the Military Athletic Club was formed at Maymyo in northern Burma by Gurkha Officers. By the end of the decade the club included Chin, Burmese, Kachin and Karen army officers. G. Bahadur, a Gurkha, was elected the first chairman of the club. Another luminary was Ba Than (Gyi) who was to serve twenty five years as Director of Physical Education of Burma before retiring. ...the International Bando Association, was established recently by Ba Than (Gyi) in memory of those who died in the China-Burma-India area for the allied cause in World War II. As such, it continues the work of the Military Athletic Club, which lapsed in 1948. It has of course a more international character, and Maung Gyi, its teacher accredited to the United States, is the son of Ba Than (Gyi). Maung Gyi a versatile fighter in his own right, having studied Chinese, Indian, Japanese and Western methods.

In 2009 the IBA became the International Thaing Bando Association (ITBA), with Vazquez Jesus Rivera as first president. He was replaced in October 2012 by Sayagyi U Hla Win, a native of Myanmar.

== Myanmar Thaing Federation ==
Myanmar Thaing Federation was formed in 1966. The secretary was the late U Chit Than, a follower of U Pye Thein. Before Myanmar Independence U Chit Than formed Youth Thaing Group on 12 January 1946 under the umbrella of All Burma Youth League (former All Asia Youth League) headed by the Minister Bagan U Ba Gyan. In commemoration of Myanmar Independence in January 1948.

All Thaing masters held the All Burma Thaing Fighting Competition at Nay Thu Yain theater, Kandawgyi lake. U Khin Maung the pupil of U Chit Than stood first in single sword competition, stood first in quarter staff competition, and stood second in duel swords competition. Mya Thein, a follower of U Chit Than, headed Youth Thaing and became the Patron of Myanmar Thaing Federation. He was awarded Social Prominence First Class by the government in 2008 for promotion of Myanmar Thaing worldwide. Thaing Gold Badge was awarded by MTF.

There are two traditional styles of Thaing that survive in Myanmar. They are the Karen School of Seven Arts and Mon School of Nine Arts.

== Bando in the West ==
Maung Gyi, the son of Ba Than Gyi, began formally teaching bando in the early 1960s in Washington, D.C. He first introduced a modified form of the discipline in Washington on 3 April 1960 and taught classes at American University until 1966; the American Bando Association was formally organised at an initiation ceremony at Ohio University in Athens, Ohio, on 15 June 1967.His Hanthawaddy style of bando is today the most popular Burmese martial art in USA. The American Bando Association incorporates nine animal styles including the bull, boar, cobra, viper, python, panther, tiger, scorpion and eagle. Students first learn the basics of bando before advancing to the animal techniques. The basis for the ABA's bando system is a 9x9 matrix of techniques and principles. The student is encouraged to grasp the underlying principles of the art, as one technique may only be useful in a certain situation, but the principle the technique is built on will be useful in many situations.

Aside from bando, the association teaches banshay, lethwei and naban. Students advance in rank through a set of coloured belts, a practice adopted from judo. This generally consists of the white, green, brown and black belts, but some schools include yellow as an advanced white belt. A student may only test for their black belt after at least five years of training. To advance to this stage, the student must exhibit proficiency in aka (empty-handed forms), stick weapons, bladed weapons, sparring, and pass a physical fitness test.

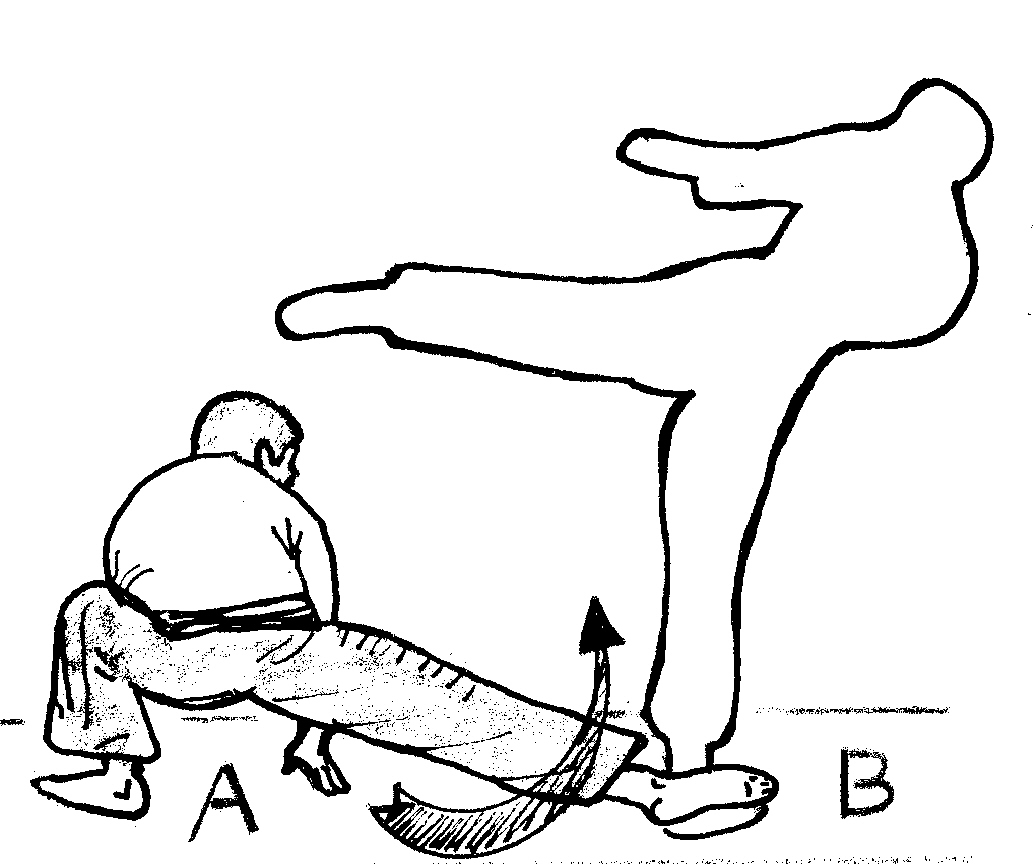
Panther sweep

Bando was introduced to Europe in the 1960s by U Hla Win, who emigrated to England and opened several teaching schools bando and lethwei in the Liverpool area. It was later introduced to France, Switzerland, and Spain by the American instructor Jonathan Collins in late 1986. Mr. Collins (deceased) was a student of Maung Gyi.

It is structured in Europe as the European Bando Thaing Federation which is a member of the International Thaing Bando Association and recognized by the Myanmar Thaing Federation.

== See also ==
- Banshay
- Lethwei
- Naban
- Bando yoga

== Bibliography ==
- Ba Than (Gyi), Manual of the Bando discipline, National Bando Association, Burma, 1946–68
- Maung Gyi, Bando, philosophy, principles et practice, IST edition, 2000
- Maung Gyi, Burmese bando boxing, ed. R. Maxwell, Baltimore, 1978
- International Thaing Bando Association, Story of Myanmar Thaing, ed. ITBA, Lausanne, 2012
