= Vappuzha =

- Ward
- Location in Kerala, India Vappuzha (India)
- Coordinates: 10.4451800°N 76.136970°E
- Country: India
- State: Kerala
- District: Thrissur
- Panchayat: Chazhoor

Population (2001)
  - Total: 1,500

Languages
  - Official: Malayalam, English
- Time zone: UTC+5:30 (IST)
- PIN: 680571
- Telephone code: 0487
- Vehicle registration: KL-08
- Nearest city: Triprayar
- Literacy: fully%

Vappuzha is a ward in the Chazhoor panchayat in the Thrissur district of Kerala state in India. Vappuzha is a mostly a farming village. A major festival in Vappuzha is Puthenpeedika church festival and Thoniyakavu festival.

== History ==
Vappuzha was an ancient port of Chera dynasty which situated near the ancient town of Irumbrayur which now known as Puthenpeedika. In ancient times, a big river were flowing through the side of the Vappuzha. The name Vappuzha were given by that river because the Malayalam meaning of Vappuzha is big river.
