= Rama Varma Parikshith Thampuran =

Ruler of Cochin

Rama Varma XV

Maharaja of Cochin
- In office 1948-1949
- Preceded by: Kerala Varma VII
- Succeeded by: Himself

Titular Maharaja of Cochin & Valiya Thampuran of Cochin Royal family
- In office 1949-1964
- Preceded by: Himself
- Succeeded by: Rama Varma XIX

Personal details
- Born: 1876
- Died: 1964 (aged 87–88)

Darsanakalanidhi Parikshith Thampuran (died 1964) was the last official ruler of the Cochin princely state. Since his father did not have any official heir to the throne, he wished for a son. As per localites he was born after several Yanjnas (a type of Hindu rituals in front of a sacred fire), the Raj Purohit (royal priest) then named him Parikshit. He was also known as Ramavarman or Kunjunni Tampuran. He was born in 1876 as the son of Raman Nambutiri of Ottur House and Manku Tampuratti. On 1 July 1949, Travancore and Cochin merged, Travancore-Cochin State came into existence, and the kingdom and the rulership came to an end. He ruled the kingdom for a period of one year and then he continued as the Valliya Thampuran of Cochin. He died in 1964 while he was in Thrippunithura. He was married to Ittyanath Madathil Madhavi from Ittyanath family Villadom, Thrissur. Madhavi was the step daughter of his uncle Rama Varma XVII and Parukutty Nethyaramma (Ittyanath Madathil Parukutty).

== Early life ==
Born in 1876, his parents were Raman Nambutiri of Ottur House and Manku Tampuratti. Local tradition suggests his birth came after his father, lacking an official heir, performed a series of Yajnas (sacred fire rituals). Consequently, the royal priest (Raj Purohit) named the boy "Parikshit".

== Reign and integration with India ==
Parikshith Thampuran ascended the throne in 1948. Breaking from the long-standing convention of hosting the ceremony at the Ariyittuvazhcha Kovilakam in Mattancherry, his coronation took place in August 1948 on the grounds of the Durbar Hall in Ernakulam. The hall, historically used to receive royal guests, is today an archaeological and art museum named the Pareekshith Thampuran Museum in his honor.

His time as a ruling monarch was brief, ending on 1 July 1949 when Cochin merged with neighboring Travancore to form the Travancore-Cochin state. During the political integration of India, the central government's envoy, V. P. Menon, arrived at the Hill Palace in Thrippunithura to finalize the merger. Unlike many contemporary royals who bargained heavily for wealth or titles, Parikshith Thampuran readily stepped down, agreeing without objection that the Maharaja of Travancore should become the Rajapramukh (Governor) for life.

A famous anecdote surrounding this merger claims the Maharaja asked for only one thing in return for handing over his kingdom: the continued free supply of the government's annual Panchangam (traditional Hindu almanac). V. P. Menon officially recorded this modest request in his book, The Story of the Integration of the Indian States. Later, however, members of the Cochin Royal Family clarified that the Maharaja himself had asked for nothing; the request for the Panchangam was actually made half in jest by his brother, Mamuni Thampuran, while chatting with Menon after the documents were signed.

Even after losing his ruling powers, he remained the Valiya Thampuran (senior-most male member) of the Cochin royal family until his death.

== Scholarship ==
Beyond his royal duties, Thampuran was a highly regarded Sanskrit scholar. He was an authority on the Nyaya school of philosophy and wrote original literature as well as commentaries on several classical works. His compositions include a number of Sanskrit Kavyas, notably the Champu Prabandha Prahlādacharita. Among his students in Nyayashastra and Natya Shastra was the legendary Koodiyattam artist Māni Mādhava Chākyār, who notably accepted the challenge of staging Thampuran's new Prahlādacharita in 1962.

== Coronation ==
Parikshith Thampuran had his coronation on the grounds of the Durbar Hall in Ernakulam in August, 1948. This was away from the convention that the coronation was to be held at the Ariyittuvazhcha Kovilakam in Mattancherry.

== Work ==
Thampuran was a Sanskrit scholar of supreme rank. He also wrote many Sanskrit Kāvya, like Prahlādacharita.He was an authority on Nyaya and wrote commentaries on several literary works, besides composing original Sanskrit works of his own.

== Personal life ==
He was married to Ittyanath Madathil Madhavi from the Ittyanath family of Villadom in Thrissur. She was the stepdaughter of his uncle, Rama Varma XVII, and Parukutty Nethyaramma.

Thampuran passed away in 1964 at Thrippunithura.

Regnal titles
Preceded by Kerala Varma VII	Maharaja of Cochin; 1949-1964	Succeeded by Rama Varma XIX
