= T. K. Nair =

Prime minister of Cochin

Thozhur Krishnan Nair

2nd Prime Minister of Cochin
- In office 27 October 1947 – 20 September 1948
- Monarch: Kerala Varma VII
- Preceded by: Panampilly Govinda Menon
- Succeeded by: E. Ikkanda Warrier
- Constituency: Chelakkara, Thrissur

Personal details
- Born: 22 May 1896 Thiruvilwamala, Thrissur, Kerala
- Died: 15 June 1972 (aged 76)
- Citizenship: Indian
- Party: People's Congress
- Profession: Politician, Social Service

Thozhur Krishnan Nair (22 May 1896 – 15 June 1972) was the second Prime Minister of the State of Cochin, India, from 1947 to 1948.
