= Prahlādacharita =

Prahlādacharitam (or Prahlādacharita) is a Sanskrit Kavya, written in Champu style by the Sanskrit scholar Darsanakalanidhi Rama Varma Parikshith Thampuran (former Maharaja of Cochin). It is the story of Asura prince Prahlāda, who was a beloved devotee of Vishnu and to save him Vishnu takes the Avatar of Narasimha.

== See also ==
- Mani Madhava Chakyar
