= Kerala Varma VI =

Ruler of the Kingdom of Cochin

Kerala Varma VI GCIE (c. 1863 – 13 October 1943) was the ruler of the Kingdom of Cochin from 23 May 1941 to 23 October 1943.

== Reign ==
Kerala Varma ascended the throne on the death of Rama Varma XVII. He was a younger brother of Rama Varma XVI. He was famously known as Midukkan Thampuran and it was during his reign that food rationing system was introduced for first time in an Indian princely state. He was an Ayurvedic physician with great knowledge.

== Personal life ==
The Maharajah fondly called Midukkan Thampuran and his wife Smt. Lakshmikutty Neithiyaramma founded the Radha Lakshmi Vilasam Academy of Music which has today become the RLV College of Music and Fine Arts, Tripunithura. He had four sons, Krishna Menon, Girijavallabhan Menon, Raghunandanan Menon and Sukamara Menon, and a daughter Radha. His fourth son, Sukumara Menon, who held a Captain's rank in the army married Bharathy Kutty, daughter of Marayil Nanu Menon.

== Death ==
The Maharaja died at Thripunithura on 23 October 1943.

Regnal titles
Preceded by Rama Varma XVII	Maharaja of Cochin; 1941–1943	Succeeded by Ravi Varma V
