= People's Congress (disambiguation) =

People's congress refers to the form of government in China under the Chinese Communist Party.

People's Congress may also refer to:

- All People's Congress, political party in Sierra Leone
- Goa People's Congress, splinter group of the Indian National Congress in Goa
- Indian People's Congress, political party in India
- Janta Congress Chhattisgarh (People's Congress Chhattisgarh), splinter group of the Indian National Congress in Chhattisgarh
- Orissa Jana Congress (Orissa Peoples Congress), former splinter group of the Indian National Congress in Orissa (1967-1977), merged into the Janata Party
- Punjab Lok Congress (Punjab People's Congress), former splinter group of the Indian National Congress in Orissa in Punjab
- National People's Congress, the sole legislative chamber in the People's Republic of China
  - There are also "local People's Congresses" in the provinces and cities
- People's Congress of Kyrgyzstan, electoral alliance in Kyrgyzstan
- People's Congress Party, political party in Solomon Islands
- Uganda People's Congress, political party in Uganda

== See also ==
- Basic People's Congress (disambiguation)
- General People's Congress (disambiguation)
