= Pumsavana Simantonayana =

Modern combination of two Hindu prenatal rites

Pumsavana Simantonayana (Sanskrit: पुंसवन सीमन्तोन्नयन, romanized: Puṃsavana Sīmantonnayana) is a combined performance of the two Hindu rites of Pumsavana and Simantonnayana (Also called Srimantham), practised during the contemporary period.

Both form a part of the prenatal rituals, part of samskara (rites of passage) in the Hindu tradition. These rituals are observed in India by the pregnant mother and father of the child, during the seventh or eighth month of pregnancy.

== Rites ==
The four prenatal rites which are part of the 16 samskaras (personal sacraments followed by Hindus and which are based on Grhya Sutras) performed on a single day, in the modern times, starting from morning till evening, are the following.

=== Srimantham ===
Srimantham is a family and a community festival with prayers seeking safe birth of the child. This is the third of 16 samskaras.

There is difference of opinion on the months when it should be performed. The authorities are not unanimous whether this saṃskāra should be performed at each pregnancy or it should be performed only during the first conception. According to Ashvalayana, Baudhayana, Apastamba, Paraskara, Harita and Devala it should be performed only once. But other authorities think that it should performed during every pregnancy.

=== Pumsavana ===
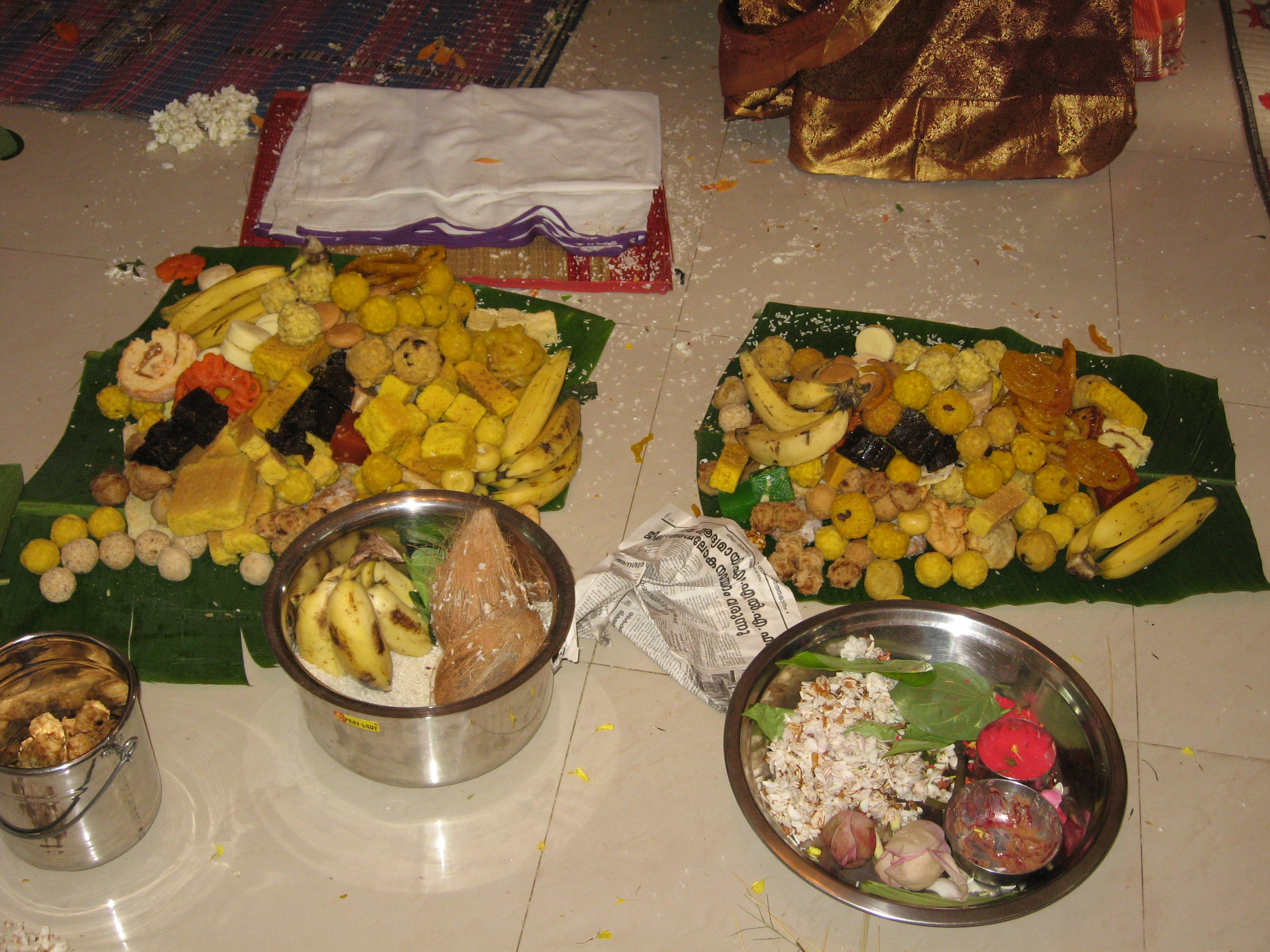
Different varieties of sweets served on a Pumsavana function.

Pumsavana (Sanskrit: पुंसवन, Puṁsavana) is also a vedic prescribed rite that is performed to beget a son. This is performed during the second, third or fourth month of pregnancy.

In some regions, this rite is combined with Srimantham and the two together is called the Pumsavana Srimantham. It includes a luncheon feast.

=== Valakappu ===
This is usually performed in the evening after the Srimantham or Pumsavana Srimantham is performed. Valakappu ( 'valai' in Tamil means "bangle" or "bracelet" and 'kappu' means to "adorn"). On this occasion, which is the prerogative of the women folk of the family to perform, the pregnant mother would be dressed in a fine silk saree, and women of all ages slip bangles and bracelets on her arm. The reasoning for this is that the bangles would act as "protective amulet against evil eye and evil spirits". This is a ritual which the Indian immigrant families in the United States also observe along with Srimantham and pooshuttal. It is similar to the baby shower ritual observed in other parts of the world.

In many Tamil Brahmin Iyer families, the mother-to-be wears a black saree for this ritual. Black is usually not allowed for any good occasion but this is a special occasion that asks for a black saree. It is also called as "masakai karuppu" meaning yearning for black. Anything that the mother-to-be yearns for must be fulfilled! The mother and mother-in-law of the lady start the ritual off by adorning the lady with 3 bangles made of Neem leaf, silver and gold. Post this all the ladies who are attending put the bangles for the mother-to-be. The ceremony closes with an arati.

=== Puchutal ===
Another related rite that used to be observed in the earlier days, as a separate ritual, but is now combined with Srimantham, in South India is called the puchutal meaning "adorning the head of the expectant mother with flowers". After observing this ritual, in the olden days, the expectant mother used to go to her parental house for delivery. In the traditional practice, the parents of the expectant mother offer gifts of new clothes, sweets, betel leaves and nuts and coconuts to their daughter and son-in-law.

== Food feast ==
Food prepared on this occasion is special and consist of rice, sambhar, rasam, chutney, two or three types of vegetable dishes, payasam, laddu, curd and appalam, and many more items.

== See also ==
- Saṃskāra
- Baby shower
