= People's National Congress =

People's National Congress may refer to:

- People's National Congress (Guyana), a political party in Guyana
- People's National Congress (Maldives), a political party in the Maldives
- People's National Congress (Papua New Guinea), a political party in Papua New Guinea

== See also ==
- National People's Congress, the state legislature of the People's Republic of China
- People's Congress (disambiguation)
- National Congress (disambiguation)
