= Thoniyakavu Bhadrakali Temple =

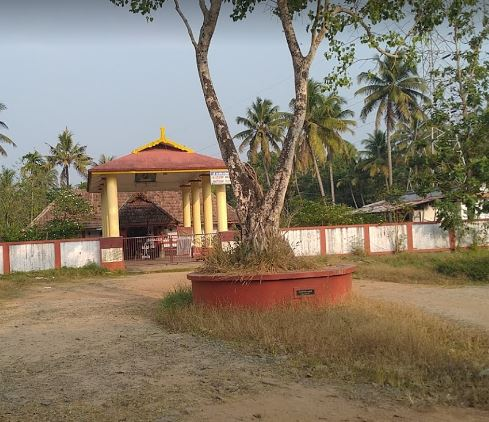
- Thoniyakavu temple puthenpeedika Hindu temple Thoniyakavu sreebadrakali temple

- Location in Kerala

Religion
- Affiliation: Hinduism
- District: Thrissur
- Deity: Bhadrakali (with four arms)
- Festivals: Aswathi Bharani vela, arattupuzha pooram
- Governing body: Cochin Devaswom Board

Location
- Location: Puthenpeedika
- State: Kerala
- Country: India
- Interactive map of Thoniyakavu Bhadrakali Temple
- Coordinates: 10.4400487°N 76.1262588°E

Architecture
- Type: Kerala Architecture
- Completed: Believed to be around 300 years old

The Thoniyakavu Temple is an ancient Hindu temple dedicated to the Goddess Bhadrakali, located in the village of Puthenpeedika in Kerala state, India.

The temple is a classic example of the architectural style of Kerala. The temple participates in pooram at the Arattupuzha Pooram festival, which is held at the Arattupuzha Temple in the Thrissur District. The Pooram, also known as "Devamela," which means "a conglomeration of gods," has a massive attendance of deities from neighbourhood shrines. The Thoniyakavu temple has other deities: Vigneswara (ganapathi), Veerabadran, and Kandakarnan, who are placed in sub-shrines, as well as a shrine for the Rakshasas.

This temple's deity is believed to be the sister deity of Thiruvanikavu Temple, situated near Peringottukara.

== Etymology ==
Initially, the temple was built near the Thiruvanikavuu Temple. However, after the devaprasnam, Bhagavathi—the deity to whom the temple is dedicated—showed the new temple's location, which is at Thoniyakavu, North Paravur, North Parur, India 683513. Loosely translated in Malayalam, "Thoniya" means feeling or intuition. "Kavu" is the traditional name given for sacred groves across the Malabar Coast in Kerala. Thus, the name of the temple means 'the grove where Bhadrakali wanted her temple built'.

== Administration ==
In October 2020, the Thonikadavu temple was under the administration of the Nair families. However, the locals took over the temple later that year and now, the temple is under the administration of the Cochin Devaswom Board.

== Festival ==
During the Bharani festival, a traditional pooram with five elephants takes place in the afternoon and night. Another tradition called "villakezhunallath" also happens, during which traditional lamps are delivered by all. Three subs pooram alapad, kizhakkumuri and chazhur-Alappuzha gather in front of the temple with different kinds of instruments. As per old traditions, there is a caste system in the festival. In the month of kumbham, the main festival, the Aswathi Bharani Karthika vela festival, is held for the Nair families. The Bharani day festival is held for the Ezhava families and the Kartika festival is held for scheduled caste families. On regular days, all castes are allowed entry. At the time of Arattupuzha Pooram festival, it is believed that the deity travels to Arattupuzha to watch the festival.
