= Rama Varma Kochaniyan Thampuran =

Indian royal

Valia Thampuran Of Cochin Royal Family
- In office 2004 July to 2014 February
- Preceded by: Kerala Varma Kochunni Thampuran
- Succeeded by: Ravi Varma Kochaniyan Thampuran

Personal details
- Born: 2 June 1912
- Died: 5 February 2014 (aged 101)
- Spouse: Sarada Mani
- Relatives: Ravi Varma V (grandfather-in-law)

Rama Varma Kochaniyan Thampuran (2 June 1912 – 5 February 2014) was an Indian royal, who was the Valiya Thampuran or oldest male member of the Cochin Royal Family. He was also a cricketer and tennis player. His widow Sarada Mani is the granddaughter of Ravi Varma V. He was one of the longest-lived members of any royal family.

== Biography ==
He completed his intermediate from Maharaja's College, Ernakulam and graduated in commerce from Calcutta University.

He took up a government job and served in various departments, including civil supplies and road transport corporation.
