= Cheloor mana =

Ancestral home of Namboodiri caste in Kerala, India

Cheloor Mana Peringottukara

Cheloor Mana is situated at Peringottukara, near Thriprayar, Thrissur district, Kerala, India. It is one among the famous ancestral homes of Namboodiris in Kerala.

Cheloor Itti Ravi Namboodiri was a member of the first Legislative Assembly of Kingdom of Cochin, convened in 1925. Along with Kaplingat Shankaran Namboodiri, he was instrumental in bringing out the 'Namboodiri Bill' which was intended to abolish polygamy among Namboodiris and aimed at many other revolutionary changes within the community. He was also one among the founders of Sree Kerala Varma College, Thrissur. He had also served as the receiver of the sitaram spinning and weaving mills ltd., trichur appointed by the high court of cochin in o.s. 2/1123 with effect from 2.7.1123 m.e. He was also a member of the Central War Committee of the Cochin during the Second World War. Mr A.F.W.Dixon, CIE. ICS the Dewan of the Cochin state, was the President of the Central War Committee.

Cheloor Mana is one among the three ooralan (owner) families of Thriprayar Temple, the others being Janappilly Mana and Punnappilly Mana.

It is an ettukettu having two internal courtyards (Nadumuttam). Cheloor Mana has got its own family temple within the Mana premises called Cheloor Narayanan Kulangara Mahavishnu Temple. Cheloor M possessed 1,841 acres (745 ha) of land in the late 1950s just before the Land Reforms Act was enforced in Kerala.
