= List of state leaders in the 20th century =

Lists of state leaders in the 20th century include:

- List of state leaders in the 20th century (1901–1950)
- List of state leaders in the 20th century (1951–2000)
- List of state leaders in 20th-century British South Asia
- List of governors of dependent territories in the 20th century
