= E. Ikkanda Warrier =

Prime Minister of Cochin

Edakunni Ikkanda Warrier
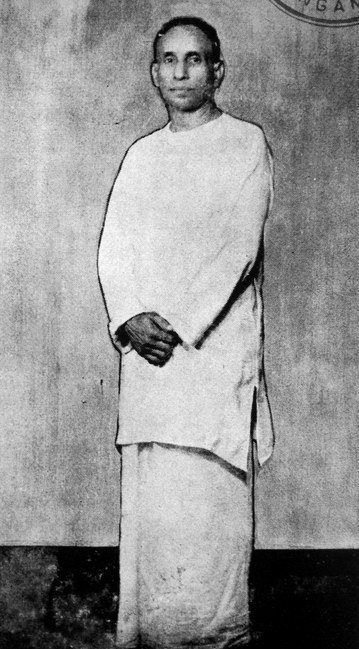
- Edakunni Ikkanda Warrier in 1947

3rd Prime Minister of Cochin
- In office 20 September 1948 – 30 June 1949
- Monarch: Kerala Varma VII
- Preceded by: T. K. Nair
- Succeeded by: Position abolished
- Constituency: Ollur, Thrissur

Personal details
- Born: 1890 Ollur, Kingdom of Kochin, British India
- Died: 1977 (aged 86–87)
- Party: Indian National Congress
- Spouse: Lakshmikuttyamma
- Children: 4
- Parents: Meledathu Sankaran Namboothiri; Edakkunni Parvathikutty Warasiar
- Education: Dr. Ambedkar Government Law College, Chennai; Maharaja's College; Madras Christian College; Government Law College, Thiruvananthapuram

Edakkunni Ikkanda Warrier, (1890–1977) was the third and the last Prime Minister of the state of Cochin, India, beginning in 1948.

== Early life ==
Warrier was born in 1890 to the Edakkunni Warriam family in Ollur, Thrissur. He received his B.A. from Madras Christian College, F.L. from Madras Law College, and B.L. from Trivandrum Law College. He set up his legal practice in Thrissur. He was an ardent supporter of the All-India States Peoples' Conference and held many offices in the organization. He is the grand nephew of Diwan of Cochin T. Sankara Warrier. He is regarded as the architect of Peechi Dam, Vazhani Dam and Peringalkuthu Dam in Thrissur District.
