= Sree Kerala Varma College =

College in Kerala, India

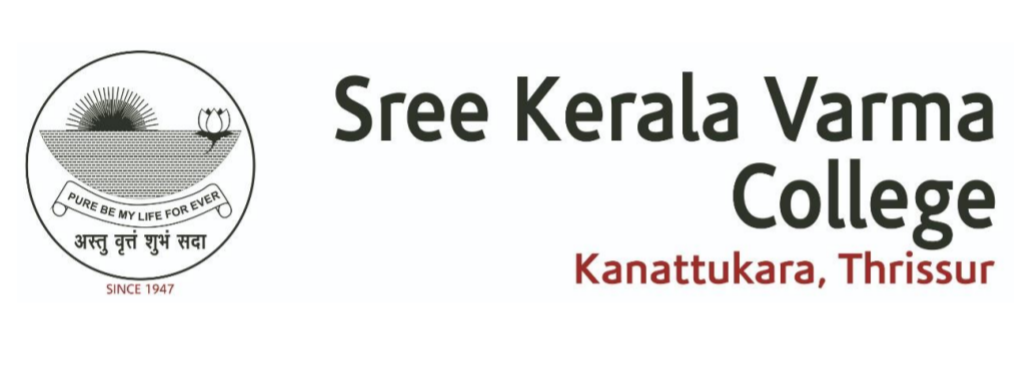
- Sree Kerala Varma College
- Other name: SKVC
- Motto: अस्तु वृत्तं शुभं सदा
- Motto in English: Pure be my Life Forever
- Type: Government Aided College
- Established: 11 August 1947; 79 years ago
- Founder: Aikya Keralam Thampuran
- Academic affiliations: University of Calicut; University Grants Commission
- Officer in charge: K. Jayanarayanan
- Principal: Prof. Sobha T D
- Faculty: 110
- Students: 2570
- Undergraduates: 2220
- Postgraduates: 300
- Doctoral students: 50
- Location: Thrissur, Kerala, India; 10.53°N 76.19°E
- Campus: Urban
- Sporting affiliations: University of Calicut
- Website: www.keralavarma.ac.in
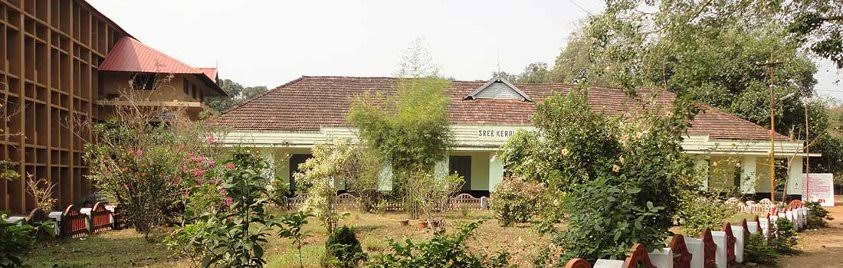

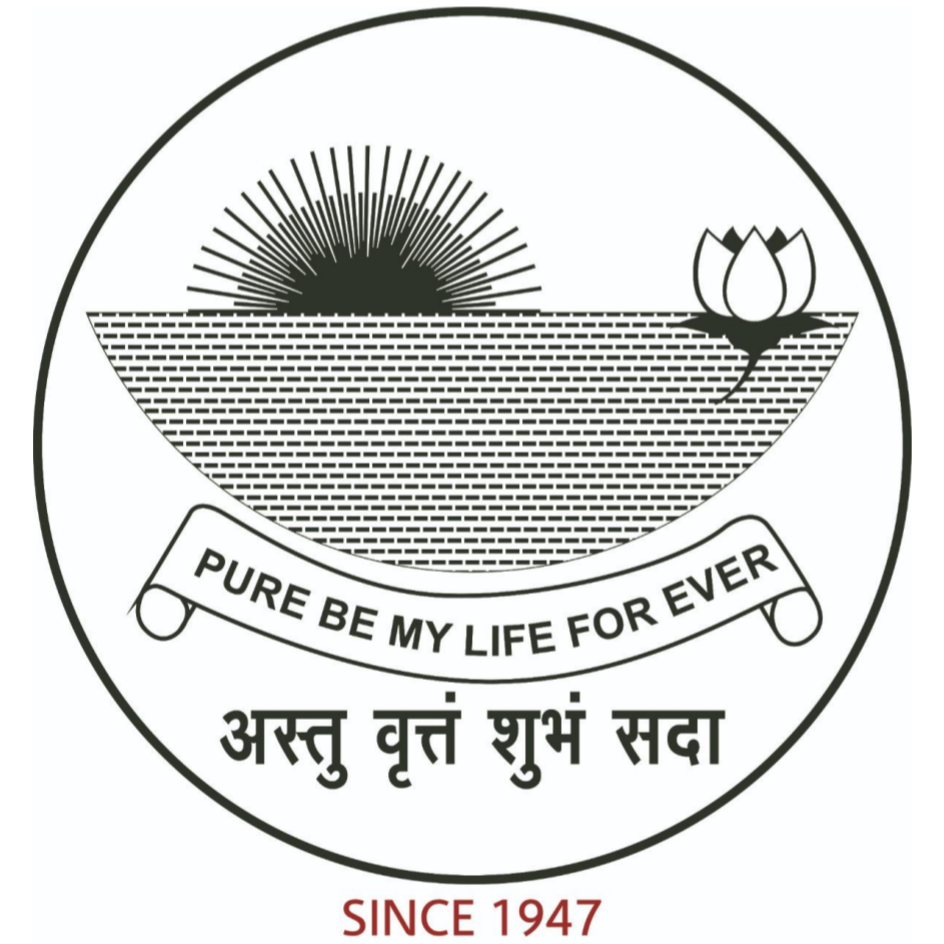

Sree Kerala Varma College is a government-aided college located in Kanattukara, Thrissur, Kerala, India. The college was established in August 1947 by Aikya Keralam Thampuran. As of 2025, the college is managed by the Cochin Devaswom Board and is affiliated with the University of Calicut.

== History ==
The establishment of a new college in Thrissur was proposed to the Maharaja of Cochin Aikya Keralam Thampuran, by a committee of citizens, including Cheloor Mana Itti Ravi Namboodiri. The Maharaja approved the proposal, granted permission for the use of Merry Lodge Palace, and agreed to name the institution Sree Kerala Varma College.

The Maharaja extended a grant of ₹100,000 to the college and a loan of ₹400,000 for capital expenditure, along with 250 cubic feet of timber for construction. The college opened on 11 August 1947; the first student admitted was V. K. Malathy, who later joined the English Department faculty, and Kavithilakan Prof. P. Sankaran Nambiar served as the institution's first principal.

Initially, the college offered Intermediate and B.A. Junior courses. In 1948, B.Com. and B.A. (Music) were introduced, with the music course noted as the first of its kind in Kerala before being discontinued in 1952–53. Science courses began in 1953–54, and in 1965 the college introduced two postgraduate programmes: M.A. in English and M.A. in Economics.

== Academics ==
=== Departments ===
Sree Kerala Varma College offers undergraduate (UG), postgraduate (PG), and research programs across various disciplines.

Academic departments and levels of study
Department	Undergraduate (UG)	Postgraduate (PG)	Research
Botany	Yes	—	—
Chemistry	Yes	Yes	—
Computer Applications	Yes	—	—
Commerce	Yes	Yes	—
Economics	Yes	Yes	—
English	Yes	Yes	Yes
Hindi	Yes	—	—
History	Yes	—	—
Malayalam	Yes	Yes	Yes
Mathematics	Yes	Yes	—
Philosophy	Yes	—	—
Physical Education	Yes	—	—
Physics	Yes	Yes	Yes
Political Science	Yes	Yes	Yes
Sanskrit	Yes	Yes	—
Statistics	Yes	—	—
Zoology	Yes	Yes	—

The college is affiliated with the University of Calicut and follows its curriculum guidelines.

== Facilities ==
The campus is about 3 kilometers from the center of Thrissur.

=== Library ===
The college library occupies a two-storey building adjacent to the administrative block. The library contains over 70,000 books and subscribes to online and print periodicals and magazines, with access to back volumes via INFLIBNET and NLIST, an online public access catalogue (OPAC), and reprography services offered through the Cooperative Store adjacent to the library building.

=== Hostel ===
There are separate hostels for male and female students. The women’s hostel accommodates 220 students and the men’s hostel accommodates 120, with a gym facility available to residents. There are four sports hostels sanctioned by the Kerala Sports Council, housing approximately 50 athletes in basketball, weightlifting, judo, and swimming.

=== Sports ===
The Prof. N. D. Subramanian Stadium on campus offers facilities for cricket, basketball, and football. The gymnasium in the Main Block is equipped for training, exercise, and bodybuilding.

== Student life ==
Students can participate in organized sports, cultural events, and extracurricular clubs, including NCC and NSS units.

=== Extracurricular activities ===
- National Cadet Corps (NCC): The college hosts an NCC unit offering leadership development, discipline, and community service opportunities.
- National Service Scheme (NSS): Through NSS, students engage in social service initiatives.
- Clubs and associations: The college supports clubs, including the Nature Club and Film Club. Disclaimer: [Sources 15-17 were acquired from mostly student reviews which are mostly opinion based and therefore may or may not be that factual]

=== Sports ===
Students participate in: football, cricket, basketball, handball, kabaddi, swimming, and boxing; facilities and coaching are provided. Disclaimer: [The following sources 19-22 are opinion based and are unreliable since it promotes the subject instead of being neutral] and

=== Festivals and events ===
- College Day: Celebrated near the end of the academic year, featuring cultural performances, awards, and community activities.
- The college departments organize several annual events, including the "Oxia" chemistry festival, the "Leyenda" political carnival, and "ASPERA," an inter-collegiate IT festival.
- Saptati celebrations: In August 2017, the college commemorated its 70th anniversary with a three‑day programme of cultural and academic activities.

== Notable alumni ==
- Maya S
- Narain, Actor

== Notable faculty ==
- C. R. Rajagopalan, folklore researcher and writer

== Student union election disputes ==
In November 2023, results of the student union election were contested. KSU candidate Sreekuttan Sivadasan was initially declared the winner by a narrow margin, but after an SFI request for a recount, the result was reversed in favour of the SFI candidate, prompting KSU allegations of malpractice and court action. The Kerala High Court dismissed the plea seeking a re-election and confirmed the victory of the SFI-backed chairman candidate. The Kerala High Court held that there were no irregularities in the recounting process and dismissed the plea seeking a re-election in the Sree Kerala Varma College union chairman election.

== See also ==
- St. Thomas College, Thrissur
- Government Law College, Thrissur
- Sri C. Achutha Menon Government College, Thrissur
- Government Engineering College, Thrissur
- Sree Krishna College, Guruvayur
