= Maya S =

Indian author and academic

Maya S ( Maya Subrahmanian or S. Maya, born 1974) is an Indian author and academic hailing from Kerala. She writes novels, poems and articles of social and academic relevance.

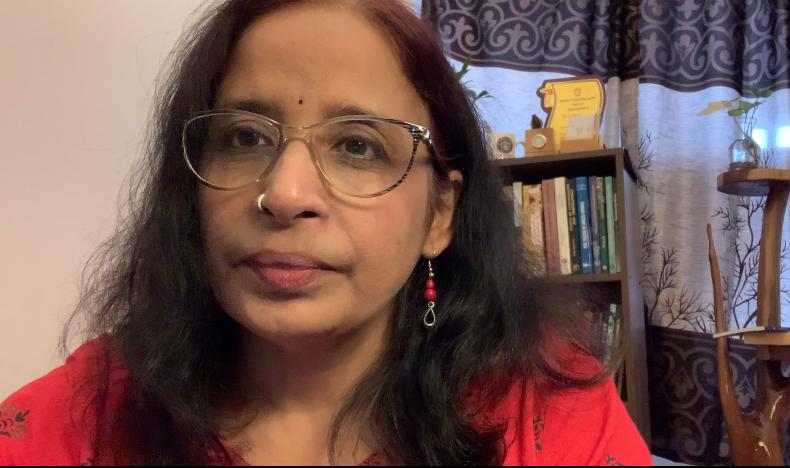
Maya Subrahmanian

== Activities ==
She was active with the women's movement in Kerala for a few years from 1996 and later became interested in learning more about feminist theory, philosophy, sociology etc. and pursued higher studies in Humanities and Social Sciences. She started research at M G University Kottayam on the issues of conceptualizing family in a patriarchal society with reference to the critique on Manusmrti.

Her research works during PhD and later have been mainly on gender issues in society and social institutions including family. She went to Germany for further research in the areas of culture and gender among diasporas joining Freiburg University with an Erasmus Mundus Fellowship.

Then she returned to India and joined Sree Kerala Varma College with a teaching position. Currently she is teaching philosophy at North-Eastern Hill University, Shillong in Meghalaya.

As a social scientist, her writings are mainly on areas of gender and philosophy. During her PhD research and later teaching tenure as guest faculty at the School of Social Sciences of M G University at Kottayam, she wrote articles for weeklies and magazines from a feminist perspective. These articles were later compiled into a book named Yukthivadavum Sthreepakshavadavum in 2008.

During this period she was also active in women's movements, and participated in various strikes, processions and protests for women's rights including that of Dalit women workers who were on strike demanding land rights around Chengara in Idukki district.

She has written analytical articles on such social issues and academic papers on women and gender issues, as well as on the history and relevance of women's socio-political activism.

== Writings ==
She has published her research in Germany about diaspora, culture and gender as a book in 2017. She also wrote articles on native Indian women's issues in a comparative mode with Indian women living abroad. Her writings appeared in German magazines which opted to discuss on third world issues. Her works were cited in German and Malayalam journals published by Malayali diaspora from Germany

After returning to Kerala also she was writing socio-political articles on philosophical and feminist analyses of current issues in Malayalam magazines and newspapers. Her articles of critical analysis on current issues appeared on online Malayalam journals too. A second book of Malayalam articles by her titled Dambathyethara Sahajeevitham, got published in 2021. In a recent talk based on the book, she explained the need for restructuring the non-democratic patriarchal family worldwide, for solving the issues of inequalities based on gender.

She writes poems at times in periodicals and little magazines including online magazines. The collection of her poems are published as two books, named Ihaparajnaanam ( 2010) and Sheshakriya in (2024). She has been writing fiction in Malayalam along with her academic writings, holding a view that fiction would communicate more with the people for a favourable social change. Her debut novel named Madhyavenalavadhikku was serialised in Samakalika Malayalam Varika in 2009. This novel was published as a printed book in 2011and later as an audiobook version in 2024. The novel dealt with the issues of inter-religious marriage in India and depicted the life of a feminist woman who divorced in a year, due to differences of opinion with the partner on politics and practice of gender inside the institution of family. Later in a talk for book review program she pointed out that it was related to her own life experiences. After a gap of twelve years she published three novels Seelavathikal, Deutschland and Veettumanushyar in 2023.
