= Parukutty Nethyar Amma =

Indian queen consort (1875–1963)

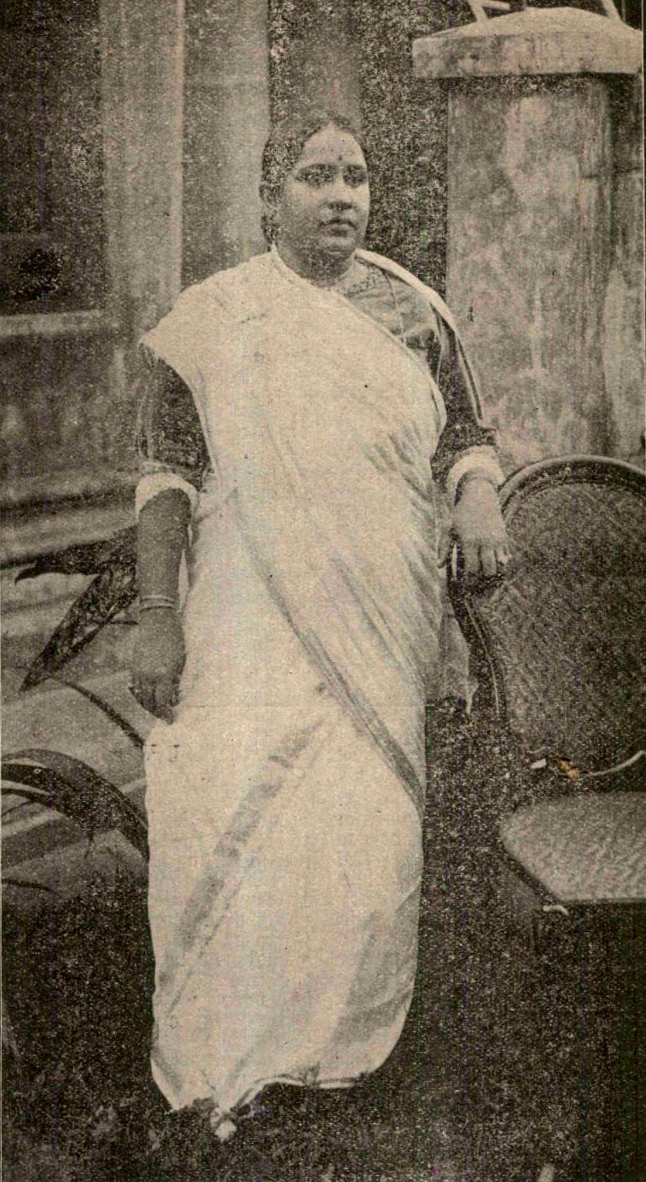

Parukutty Nethyar Amma (5 July 1875 – 25 February 1963) was the consort of the ruler of the Kingdom of Cochin, Maharaja Rama Varma XVI (popularly known as Madrassil Theepetta Thampuran), who reigned from 1914 to 1932. She had been known as Lady Rama Varma of Cochin.

The Nethyar was the daughter of Kurur Namboodiripad, who was a member of the family that had the traditional honour of anointing the kings of Palakkad. Her mother belonged to the Padinjare Shrambhi, the aristocratic Vadakke Kuruppath Menon house of Trichur. She married the Maharaja, then fourth in line to the succession when she was fourteen years old in 1888. It is said that she was especially blessed by the Devi at the Chottanikkara Temple. By a quirk of fate, her husband ascended the throne as a result of the abdication of his predecessor, Rama Varma XV. Since the Maharaja was a scholar and had other interests (including knowledge of how to cure snake bites and comprehend the language of lizards known as Gawli Shashtra), she took over the finances of the state. Under her guidance salaries were quadrupled and the increased revenue earned her a 17-gun salute. Parukutty Nethyar Amma was awarded the Kaiser-i-Hind Medal by King George V in 1919 for public work and came to be known as Lady Rama Varma of Cochin.

The Nethyar Amma was not only an able administrator but also a Nationalist, moving from being seen as an exemplary public figure in the eyes of the British to earning the ire of the colonial state for her relationships with Mahatma Gandhi and Indian nationalists. As one British intelligence report stated, "The hill palace is the centre of nationalist activity and charkhas have been introduced to assist the weaving of khadi." (see Fortnightly Intelligence Reports available at the National Archives of India) In addition, a little known fact about the Cochin state is the attempt made by the British government and the Viceroy to force the Maharajah to abdicate under the ploy of trying to prove him insane. A doctor was brought from London to bolster the case, and the physician opined that the "Maharaja was merely an old man who tired easily". This attempt was directly linked to the fear that the Nethyar Amma was becoming increasingly powerful in nationalist circles.

The head of the Congress party in Cochin was Kurur Nilakantan Namboodiripad who was a cousin of the Nethyar Amma. The Collected Works containing Gandhi's letters include correspondence between the Maharajah's daughter V. K. Vilasini Amma and himself, and a second daughter V.K Ratnamma was married to R. M. Palat, himself a politician and the son of Sir C. Sankaran Nair, the former president of the Congress Party and well known nationalist. The Maharaja's eldest son V. K. Raman Menon studied in Oxford, married to Tiruthipalli Payathil Madhavi, and had one son by name V. K. T. Raman Menon. The Maharaja's second son V.K Aravindaksha Menon was married to Malathy, the daughter of V. K. Narayana Menon a prominent contractor in Trichur in whose house "Pandyala", Jawaharlal Nehru, Kamala and Indira Nehru rested on their way to Sri Lanka. When Gandhi visited Cochin, he was treated as a state guest, and Aravindaksha Menon, the Nethyar Amma's son personally was deputed to accompany him. Soon Parukutty Nethyar Amma appeared unopposed, which proved to be a significant hurdle for British interests in India.

On the death of the Maharaja, the Nethyar Amma initially retired to the palace she had constructed for herself in her home town Trichur, near her ancestral house, Padinjare Shrambhi. The house, Ratna Vilas, was named after her elder daughter Ratnam. The Nethyar Amma then went on an extended tour abroad, taking along her grandson Sankaran Palat, who was admitted to Le Rosey in Switzerland and later to Charterhouse, England. She returned to India and divided her time between Trissur and Coonoor, where she purchased two tea estates and a tea factory.
