= Kingdom of Cochin =

Monarchy in India before 1949

Kingdom of Cochin കൊച്ചി രാജ്യം
- 12th century CE–1 July 1949
- Flag

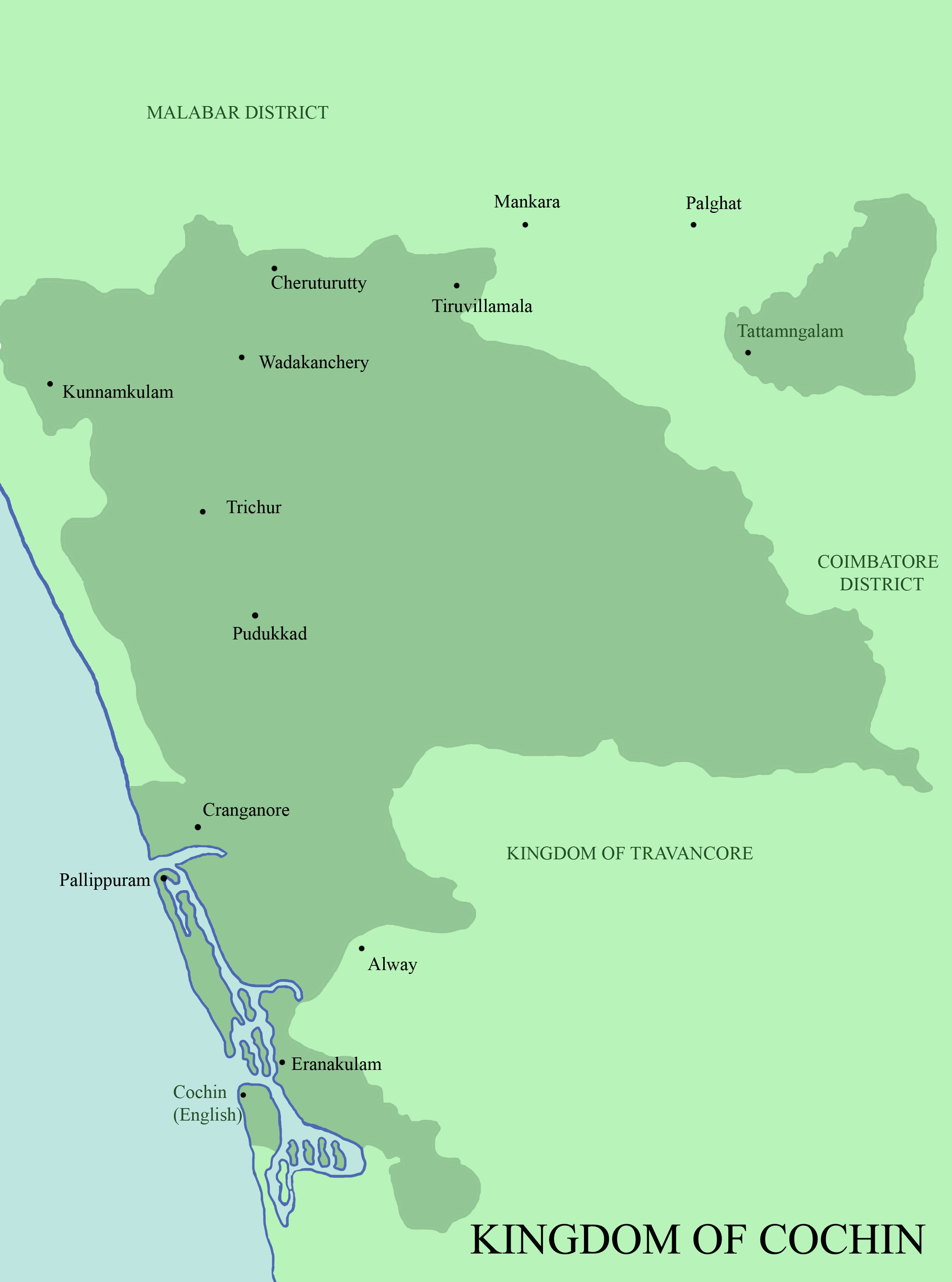
- Status: Independent Kingdom (12th Century CE–1370); Under the Vijayanagara Empire (1370–1565); Independent Kingdom (1565–1766); Under the kingdom of Mysore (1766–1799); Semi-Independent; Subordinately alliance with the British East India Company (1799–1815); Princely State of India (1815–1947)
- Capital: Perumpadappu (Ponnani); Kodungallur; Thripunithura; Thrissur; Mattancherry
- Official languages: Malayalam
- Religion: Majority: Hinduism (official); Minority: Christianity; Judaism; Islam
- Government: Absolute monarchy Princely state
- Raja
  - 12th century CE (first): Veera Kerala Varma
  - 1948–1949 (last): Rama Varma XVIII
- Diwan
  - 1812–1818 (first): John Munro
  - 1944–1947 (last): C. P. Karunakara Menon
- History
  - Established: 12th century CE
  - Disestablished: 1 July 1949
- GDP (PPP): estimate
  - Total: 600.03 crores USD
- Currency: Rupee
Preceded by	Succeeded by
Chera Dynasty	Travancore-Cochin
- Today part of: India

The Kingdom of Cochin or the Cochin State, also known as Perumpadappu Swaroopam, named after its capital in the city of Kochi (Cochin), was a kingdom in the central part of present-day Kerala state. It originated in the early part of the 12th century and continued to rule until its accession to the Dominion of India in 1949.

The kingdom of Cochin, originally known as Perumpadappu Swaroopam, was under the rule of the Later Cheras in the Middle Ages. After the fall of the Mahodayapuram Cheras in the 12th century, along with numerous other provinces Perumpadappu Swaroopam became a free political entity. However, it was only after the arrival of Portuguese on the Malabar Coast that the Perumpadappu Swaroopam acquires any political importance. Perumpadappu rulers had family relationships with the Nambudiri rulers of Edappally. After the transfer of Kochi and Vypin from the Edappally rulers to the Perumpadappu rulers, the latter came to be known as kings of Kochi.

Historically, the capital of Cochin was in Kodungallur (Cranganore), but in 1341, the capital was moved to Cochin to remedy a disastrous flood. By the early 15th century, Cochin lost its ability to fully defend itself. By the late 15th century, the kingdom had shrunk to its minimal extent as a result of invasions by the Zamorin of Calicut.

When Portuguese armadas arrived in India, the kingdom of Cochin had lost its vassals to the Zamorins, including Edapalli and Cranganore, the later of which had even been at the centre of the kingdom historically. Cochin was looking for an opportunity to preserve its independence, which was at risk. King Unni Goda Varma warmly welcomed Pedro Álvares Cabral on 24 December 1500 and negotiated a treaty of alliance between Portugal and the Cochin kingdom, directed against the Zamorin of Calicut. A number of forts were built in the area and controlled by the Portuguese East Indies, the most important of which was Fort Manuel. Cochin became a long-term Portuguese protectorate (1503–1663) providing assistance against native and foreign powers in India. After the Luso-Dutch War, the Dutch East India Company (1663–1795) was an ally of Cochin. That was followed by the British East India Company (1795–1858, confirmed on 6 May 1809) after the Anglo-Dutch War, with British paramountcy over the Cochin state.

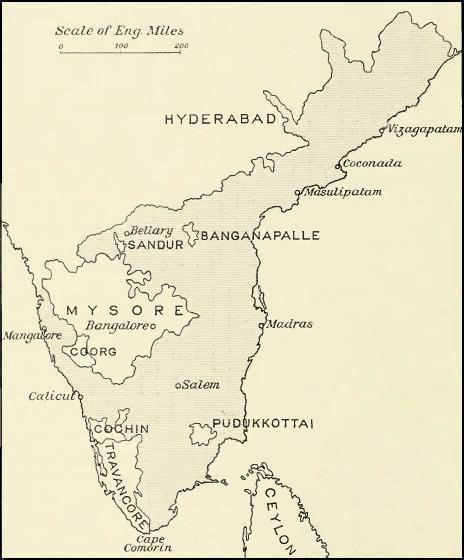
Madras State Map, 1913

The kingdom of Travancore merged with the kingdom of Cochin to form the state of Travancore-Cochin in 1950. The five Tamil-majority taluks of Vilavancode, Kalkulam, Thovalai, Agastheeswaram, and Sengottai were transferred from Travancore-Cochin to Madras State in 1956. The Malayalam-speaking regions of Travancore-Cochin merged with the Malabar District (excluding Laccadive and Minicoy Islands) and the Kasaragod taluk of South Canara district in Madras State to form the modern Malayalam-state of Kerala on 1 November 1956, according to the States Reorganisation Act, 1956 of the Government of India.

== Territories ==
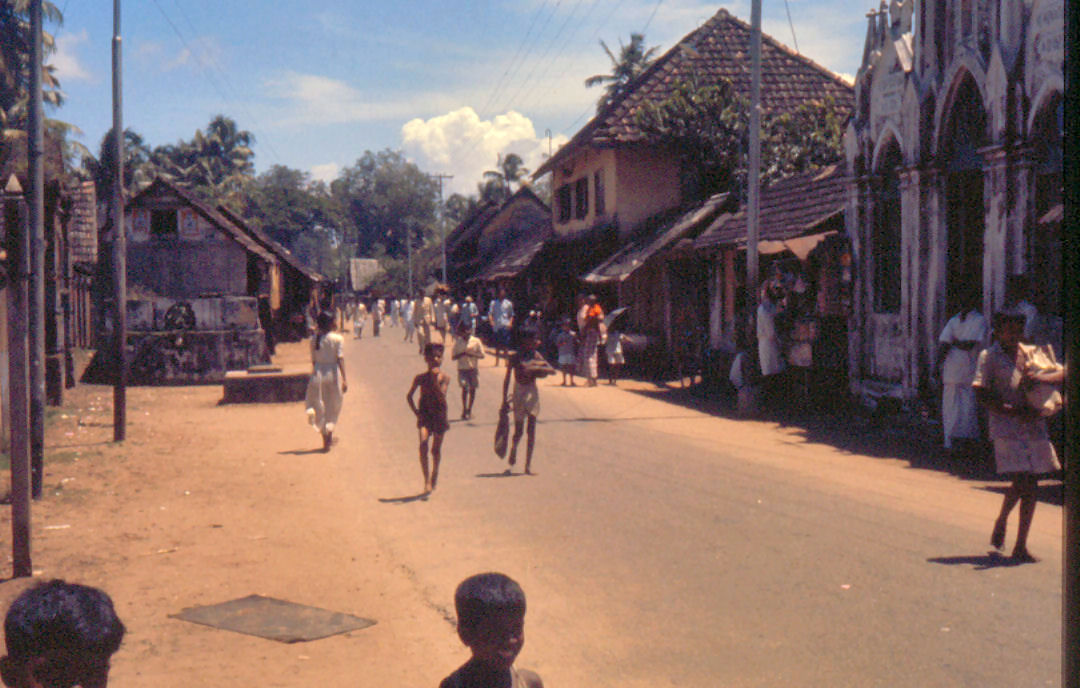
Cochin in the 1960s, just a few years after joining the union

During 1800 to 1947, the kingdom of Cochin included much of modern-day Thrissur district excluding Chavakkad taluk, a few areas of Alathur taluk and the whole of Chittur taluk of the Palakkad district and Kochi taluk (excluding Fort Kochi), most of Kanayannur taluk (excluding Edappally), parts of Aluva taluk (Karukutty, Angamaly, Kalady, Chowwara, Kanjoor, Sreemoolanagaram, Malayattoor, Manjapra), parts of Kunnathunad taluk and parts of Paravur Taluk (Chendamangalam) of the Ernakulam district which are now the part of Kerala.

== History ==
=== Origin ===
There is no extant written evidence about the emergence of the kingdom of Cochin or of the Cochin royal family, also known as Perumpadapu Swaroopam. All that is recorded are folk tales and stories, and a somewhat blurred historical picture about the origins of the ruling dynasty.

The surviving manuscripts, such as Keralolpathi, Keralamahatmyam, and Perumpadapu Grandavari, are collections of myths and legends that are less than reliable as conventional historical sources.

The Perumpadapu Grandavari contains an additional account of the dynastic origins:

The last Thavazhi of Perumpadapu Swaroopam came into existence on the Kaliyuga day shodashangamsurajyam. Cheraman Perumal divided the land in half, 17 "amsa" north of Nileshwaram and 17 amsa south, totaling 34 amsa, and gave his powers to his nephews and sons. Thirty-four kingdoms between Kanyakumari and Gokarna (now in Karnataka) were given to the "thampuran" who was the daughter of the last niece of Cheraman Perumal.

Keralolpathi recorded the division of his kingdom in 345 Common Era, Perumpadapu Grandavari in 385 Common Era, William Logan in 825 Common Era. There are no written records on these earlier divisions of Kerala, but according to some historians the division might have occurred during the Second Chera kingdom at the beginning of the 12th century.

The earliest historical attestation to the Kingly line of what was to become the Kingdom of Cochin was the ruler of Kodungallur, Vira Kerala Viragahava. He is attested in the Viraraghava copper plate as having given Sovereign Port Concessions and Princely Privileges to Syrian Christian Merchant Iravikortan in 1225 CE.

=== Early history ===
The original headquarters of the kingdom was at Perumpadappu near Ponnani in present-day Malappuram district. The ruler of Perumpadappu (near Ponnani) fled to Kodungallur in the early medieval period, when the Zamorin of Calicut annexed Ponnani region, after Tirunavaya war.

Calicut (Porlathiri kingdom) was conquered by Zamorin of Eranad, who then conquered parts of Perumpadappu kingdom, and tried to assert his suzerainty over it.

Although losing their northern homeland and original capital, the Perumpadappu dynasty maintained a kingdom over a vast area in central Kerala (still formally referred to as "Perumpadappu Swaroopam"). Their state stretched from Pukkaitha in the north, Aanamala in the east, to Purakkad in the south.

=== Royal dynasty and succession ===
The Perumpadappu dynasty eventually produced five branches (Mutts, Elaya, Pallurutti, Madattumkil and Chaliyur), each with its own family seat, retainers and military of Nairs. But the five branches (tavali) came together under a common ruling king (raja), which was the oldest male member of all five branches together.

The Perumpadappu (and future Cochin) royal dynasty followed matriarchal rules of succession common in Kerala (similar to Travancore). Succession went via the female line – that is, not to the king's sons, but to his uterine brothers and then to his sisters' sons (i.e. nephews). In theory, the successor should be the next oldest in age among potential candidates. This was later relaxed, and in practice kingship became elective, to ensure the successor was not too old or incompetent. The overlooked true elder was compensated with symbolic or ceremonial dignities (notably the religiously significant title Muppustanam).

Retirement was also forced – it was customary and expected for a king to retire upon reaching a certain old age or military inability, withdrawing to take up a religious life. Power was passed over to his successor, or to a regent until the successor came of age.

Succession often led to quarrels among the five branches. The Zamorin of Calicut exploited these family quarrels, sometimes in the role of arbitrator, allowing him to increase his influence in the southern kingdom.

=== Transition to Cochin ===
The future city of Cochin was originally just a small village along a long embankment. Violent floods and overflows of the Periyar River in 1341 forced the opening of the outlet between the Vembanad lagoon and the Arabian Sea at the juncture where Cochin now sits, separating the long Cochinese peninsula (karapuram) from what is now Vypin island.

As the waterways connecting Cranganore to the sea were silting up, commercial traffic began re-directing away from Cranganore to the new break at Cochin, and merchant families began to relocate and set up warehouses and eventually homes there. The once-great old port city of Kodungallur (Cranganore) declined as the new port-city of Kochi (Cochin) rose in wealth and importance. The urban center of the early city developed on relatively high ground in the village of Mattancherry (now a district in Kochi city, once called "Cochim de Cima").

The original owners of the territory of what later became Cochin city was the Ellangallur royal family of the Rajas of Edapalli (Repelim) (on the east side of the lagoon). Drawn from the Brahmin class, the Edapalli royal family followed different rules of succession. In the early 1400s, the king of Edapalli had married a sister of the Elaya branch of Perumpadappu, and so their son was doubly royal heir to two houses – via father to Edapalli, via mother to Perumpadappu . But he was apparently not first in the line of succession to Perumpadappu.

In the early 1400s, the King of Edapalli granted part of his lands, specifically southern Vypin island and northern part of Karapuram peninsula around the new break, as an appanage fief for his prince son. It was originally not supposed to be a permanent cession, but rather to serve as a training ground, to allow the heir to cultivate his governing skills. Upon succession to his father, he was expected to move across the lagoon to Edapalli, and cede Cochin as a seat to the next heir. As the ruler was always a prince in training, he was addressed as "Kocchu Thampuran" (meaning 'junior lord' or 'junior king'), thus the fief became known as "Kochi/Cochin" after him. So the original "kingdom of Cochin" (Kochi rajyam) started off as a small Edapalli offshoot, distinct and separate from the much larger Perumpadappu state.

The growing wealth of Cochin gave the junior prince in Cochin power and ascendancy, eventually enabling him to assert himself as king over senior relatives from other branches of the Perumpadappu dynasty, as well as allowing him to detach Cochin from Edapalli, and chart his own separate course.

As a result of this transition, the large "kingdom of Perumpadappu" (Perumpadappu Swaroopam) came to be referred to as the "kingdom of Cochin", and the capital of the kingdom shifted from Kodungallur to Vypin in present-day Kochi. During the new kingdom, rules were changed to confine succession within the Elaya branch of Cochin, rather across all branches of Perumpadappu (much to the chagrin of the branches).

=== Ming dynasty alliance (1411–1433) ===
The port at Kozhikode, also known as Calicut, held superior economic and political position on the medieval Kerala coast, while Kannur, Kollam, and Kochi, were commercially important secondary ports, where the traders from various parts of the world would gather. On the Malabar coast during the early 15th century, Calicut and Cochin were in an intense rivalry, so the Ming dynasty of China decided to intervene by granting special status to Cochin and its ruler, known as Keyili (可亦里) to the Chinese. Calicut had been the dominant port-city in the region, but Cochin was emerging as its main rival. For the fifth Ming treasure voyage, Admiral Zheng He was instructed to confer a seal upon Keyili of Cochin and designate a mountain in his kingdom as the Zhenguo Zhi Shan (鎮國之山, Mountain Which Protects the Country). Zheng He delivered a stone tablet, inscribed with a proclamation composed by the Yongle Emperor himself, to Cochin. As long as Cochin remained under the protection of Ming China, the Zamorin of Calicut was unable to invade Cochin and a military conflict was averted. The cessation of the Ming treasure voyages consequently had negative results for Cochin, as the Zamorin of Calicut later launched an invasion against Cochin. In the late 15th century, the Zamorin occupied Cochin and installed his representative as the king.

=== Vassal of Calicut ===
The conflict between the upstart king of Cochin and his relatives of Perumpadappu branches (eager to recover their role) and Edapalli (eager to recover its land), drew in the interference of the Zamorin of Calicut, who attacked Cochin in the name of justice for the relatives. The Zamorin's armies were eventually successful and imposed a settlement, which confined the king of Cochin to his domains, and extracted an oath of vassalage to Calicut. The kingdom of Cochin was required to obtain the Zamorin's consent during succession, and obliged to provide annual tribute and troops to the Zamorin's campaigns.

This was roughly the situation when the Portuguese arrived in 1500. The kingdom of Cochin was half-in-vassalage, half-at-war with the Zamorin of Calicut. The king of Cochin, Unni Goda Varda (referred to as "Trimumpara Raja" in Portuguese chronicles) was grating at the settlement. He perceived an alliance with Portuguese arms as way to overthrow the Zamorin's power, recover Cochin's independence and impose his ascendancy over his relatives.

=== Portuguese alliance (1500–1663) ===
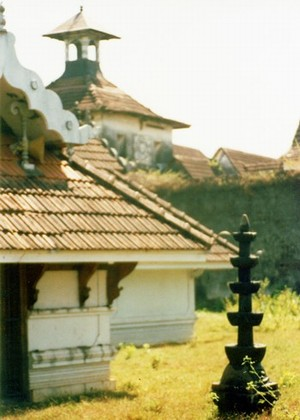
Mattancherry Palace-temple, built by the Portuguese as a gift to Raja Veera Kerala Varma I

The Portuguese arrived at Kappad, Kozhikode in 1498 during the Age of Discovery, thus opening a direct sea route from Europe to India. Cochin was the scene of the first European settlement in India. In the year 1500, the Portuguese Admiral Pedro Álvares Cabral landed at Cochin after being repelled from Calicut. The Raja of Cochin welcomed the Portuguese and a treaty of friendship was signed. The raja allowed them to build a factory at Cochin (and upon Cabral's departure Cochin allowed thirty Portuguese and four Franciscan friars to stay in the kingdom). Assured by the offer of support, the raja declared war on his enemy, the Zamorins of Calicut.

In 1502, a new expedition under the command of Vasco da Gama arrived at Cochin, and the friendship was renewed. Vasco da Gama later bombarded Calicut and destroyed the Arab factories there. This enraged the Zamorin, the ruler of Calicut, and he attacked Cochin after the departure of Vasco da Gama and destroyed the Portuguese factory. The raja of Cochin and his Portuguese allies were forced to withdraw to Vypin Island. However, the arrival of a small reinforcement Portuguese fleet and, some days later of Duarte Pacheco Pereira and the oncoming monsoons alarmed the Zamorin. Calicut recalled the army and abandoned the siege.

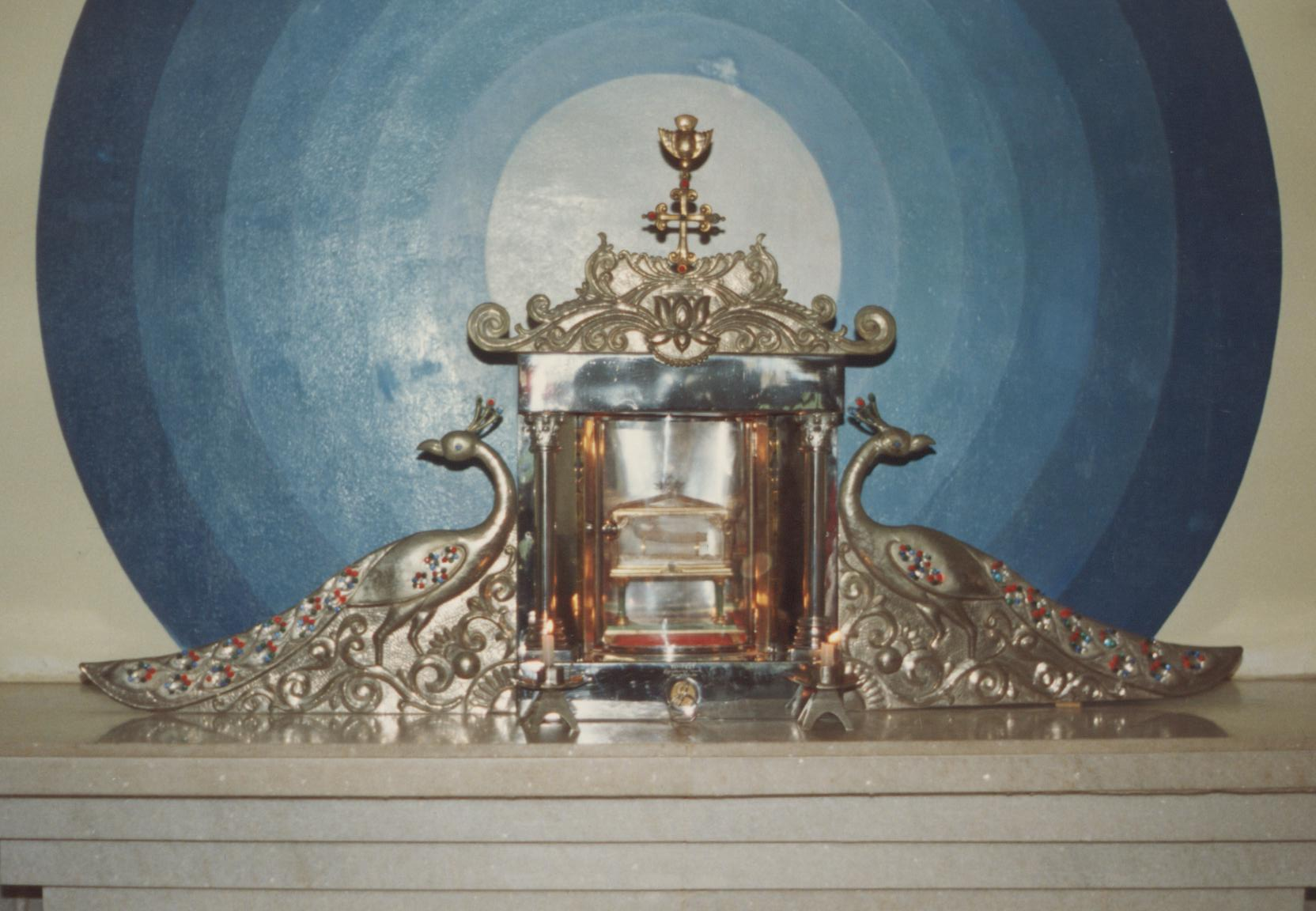
Relic of Thomas the Apostle, kept in the sanatorium of a Syrian Church

After securing the throne for the Raja of Cochin, the Portuguese got permission to build a fort – Fort Emmanuel (at Fort Kochi, named after the king of Portugal) – surrounding the Portuguese factory, in order to protect it from any further attacks from Calicut and on 27 September 1503 the foundations of a timber fort, the first fort erected by the Portuguese in India, were laid. The entire work of construction was commissioned by the local raja, who supplied workers and material. In 1505, the stone fortress replaced the wooden fort. Later, for a better defence of the town, a fort called "Castelo de Cima" was built on Vypeen Island. At the departure of the Portuguese fleet, only Duarte Pacheco Pereira and a small fleet were left in Cochin. Meanwhile, the Zamorin of Calicut formed a massive force and attacked them. For five months, Cochin kingdom was able to drive back Calicut's assaults, with the help of Pacheco Pereira and his men.

The ruler of the kingdom of Tanur, who was a vassal to the Zamorin of Calicut, sided with the Portuguese against his overlord at Kozhikode. As a result, the kingdom of Tanur (Vettathunadu) became one of the earliest Portuguese colonies in India. The ruler of Tanur also sided with Cochin. Many of the members of the royal family of Cochin in 16th and 17th centuries were selected from Vettom. However, the Tanur forces under the king fought for the Zamorin of Calicut in the Battle of Cochin (1504). However, the allegiance of the Muslim Mappila merchants in Tanur region stayed with the Zamorin of Calicut.

The raja of Cochin continued to rule with the help of the Portuguese. Meanwhile, the Portuguese secretly tried to enter into an alliance with the Zamorin. A few later attempts by the Zamorin to conquer the Cochin port were thwarted by the raja of Cochin with the help of the Portuguese. Slowly, the Portuguese armoury at Cochin was increased, presumably to help the king protect Cochin. And for a long a time, right after Goa, Cochin situated in the center of East Indies, was the best place Portugal had in India. From there the Portuguese exported large volumes of spices, particularly pepper.

In 1530, Saint Francis Xavier arrived and founded a Latin Christian mission. Cochin hosted the grave of Vasco da Gama, the Portuguese viceroy, who was buried at St. Francis Church until his remains were returned to Portugal in 1539. Soon after the time of Afonso de Albuquerque, Portuguese influence in Kerala declined.

=== Dutch alliance (1663–1766) ===
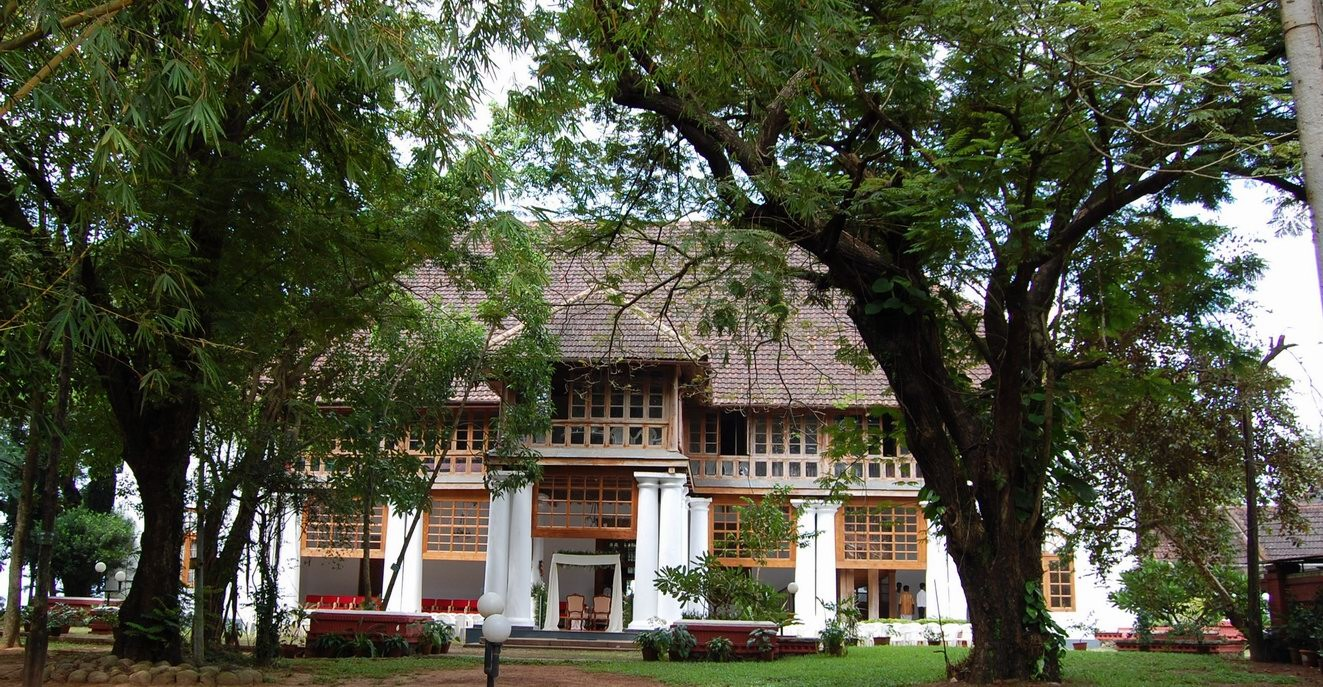
The Bolgatty Palace, built in 1744 by Dutch traders, is one of the oldest existing Dutch palaces outside the Netherlands

Portuguese alliance was followed by that of the Dutch, who had by then conquered Quilon after various encounters with the Portuguese and their allies. Discontented members of the Cochin Royal family called on the assistance of the Dutch for help in overthrowing the Cochin Raja. The Dutch successfully landed at Njarakal and went on to capture the fort at Pallippuram, which they handed over to the Zamorin.

=== Mysorean invasion (1766–1799) ===
Mysorian ruler Hyder Ali conquered Cochin. After his conquest of Bednur reached Ali Rajah of Cannanore in 1763, he promptly asked Ali to invade Kerala and help him deal with the Zamorin of Calicut. The Muslim chieftain of Cannanore, an old rival of the neighbouring powerful Kolathiri, was an active ally of Mysore under the occupation.

Ali Raja seized and set fire to the palace of Kolathiri Raja. The latter escaped with his followers to the then-British settlement at Tellicherry. After the victory, Hyder Ali entered the kingdom of Kottayam in present-day North Malabar and occupied it, with assistance from native Muslims, after some resistance by the Kottayam army.

After taking Calicut in a bloody battle, Hyder Ali, with a large amount of money, marched south-east towards Coimbatore through Palghat. Mysore appointed Ali Raja as military governor and Madonna (a former revenue officer) as civil governor of the newly acquired province of Malabar.

=== British alliance (1814–1947) ===
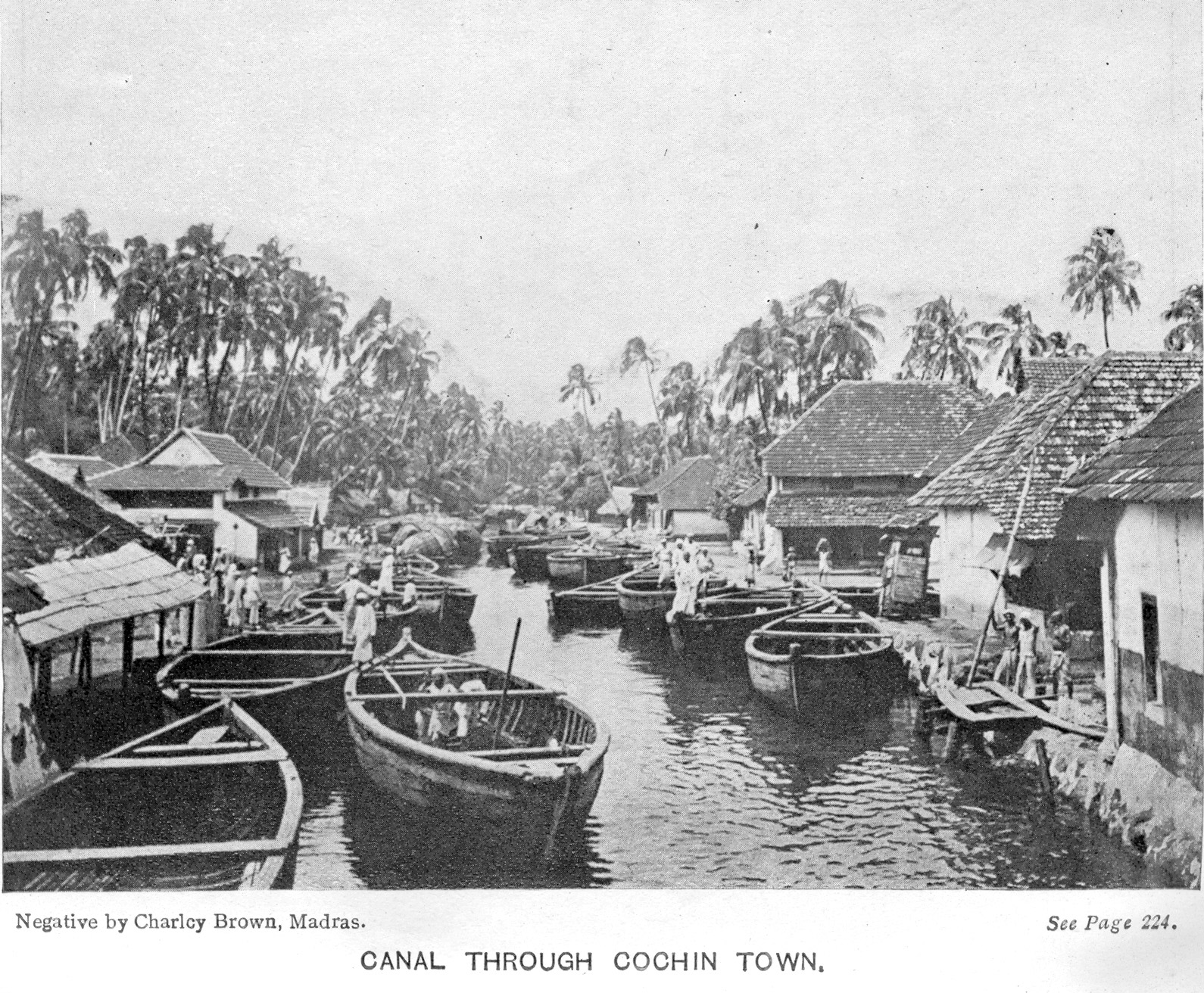
Cochin in 1913

In 1814, according to the Anglo-Dutch Treaty, the islands of Kochi, including Fort Kochi and its territory, were ceded to the United Kingdom in exchange for the island of Banca. Even prior to the signing of the treaty, there is evidence of English residents in Kochi. During the British Raj, the Princely State of Cochin was surrounded by British Malabar District to three sides (i.e., To north, west, and east), and by Travancore to the south. By signing the alliance with Britain, Cochin avoided being conquered.

Towards the early 20th century, trade at the port had increased substantially and the king wanted to develop the port even further. The king brought a harbour engineer Robert Bristow to Cochin in 1920, with the help of Lord Willingdon, then Governor of Madras. Over a span of 21 years he helped the king of Cochin to transform Cochin into the safest harbour in south Asia, where ships berthed alongside the newly reclaimed inner harbour, which was equipped with a long array of steam cranes.

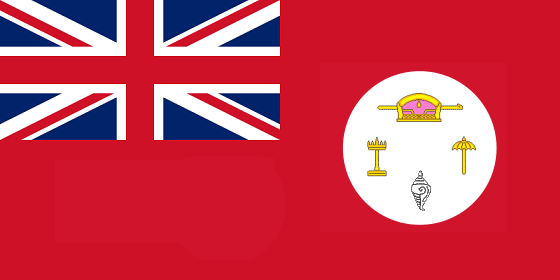
Cochin State Merchant Flag

Meanwhile, Fort Cochin, which was a part of Malabar District until 1956, was made a municipality on 1 November 1866, along with Kannur, Thalassery, Kozhikode, and Palakkad, according to the Madras Act 10 of 1865 (Amendment of the Improvements in Towns act 1850) of the British Indian Empire, and its first Municipal Council election with a board of 18 members was conducted in 1883. The Maharajah of Cochin initiated local administration in 1896 by forming town councils in Mattancherry and Ernakulam. In 1925, a Kochi legislative assembly was also constituted to help the public participate in the administration. The assembly consisted of 45 members, 10 were officially nominated. Thottakkattu Madhaviamma was the first woman to be a member of any legislature in India.

Cochin was the first princely state to willingly join the new Dominion of India in 1947. India became a republic on 26 January 1950. Travancore merged with Cochin to create Travancore-Cochin, which was in turn unified with the Malabar district of Madras Presidency. Kasaragod was merged into it and Kanyakumari was removed from it. On 1 November 1956, the Indian state of Kerala was formed.

== Administration ==
For administrative purposes, Cochin was divided into seven taluks (from 1860 to 1905 AD): Chittur, Cochin, Cranganore, Kanayannur, Mukundapuram, Trichur, and Talapilly.

Taluk	Area (in square miles)	Headquarters
Chittur	285	Chittur
Cochin	63	Mattancherry
Cranganore	19	Cranganore (Now Kodungallur)
Kanayannur	81	Ernakulam
Mukundapuram	418	Irinjalakuda
Talapalli	271	Wadakkanchery
Trichur	225	Trichur (Now Thrissur)
Total	1,362	

=== Capitals ===
The capital of Perumpadapu Swaroopam was located at Chitrakooda in the Perumpadapu village of Vanneri from the beginning of the 12th century to the end of the 13th century. Even though the capital of Perumpadapu Swaroopam was in Vanneri, the Perumpadapu king had a palace in Mahodayapuram.

When the Zamorins attacked Vanneri in the later part of the 13th century, Perumpadapu Swaroopam shifted their capital from Vanneri to Mahodayapuram. In 1405, Perumpadapu Swaroopam changed their capital from Mahodayapuram to Cochin. By the end of the 14th century, the Zamorin conquered Thrikkanamathilakam and it became a threat for Mahodayapuram (Thiruvanchikulam), which may be the reason that Perumpadapu Swaroopam changed their capital to Cochin from Mahodayapuram. Moreover, in the year 1341 a flood created an island, Puthuvippu (Vypin), and Cochin became a noted natural harbour for the Indian Ocean trade. The old Kodungallore (Cranganore) port lost its importance, which may also be a cause for the shift of the capital. From there on Perumpadapu Swaroopam used the name Cochin Royal Family.

Finally, the arrival of the Portuguese on the Indian subcontinent in the sixteenth century likely influenced Cochin politics. The kingdom of Cochin was among the first Indian nations to sign a formal treaty with a European power, negotiating trade terms with Pedro Álvares Cabral in 1500.

The palace at Kalvathhi was originally the residence of the kings. In 1555, though, the royal palace moved to Mattancherry, and later relocated to Thrissur. At that time Penvazithampuran (Female Thampuran) and the other Kochuthampurans (other Thampurans except the Valliathampuran (King)) stayed at a palace in Vellarapilly.

In the beginning of the 18th century Thripunithura started gaining prominence. The kingdom was ruled from Thrissur, Cochin and Thripunithura. Around 1755 Penvazithampuran (Female Thampuran) and the other Kochuthampurans (other Thampurans) left Vellarapalli and started to live in Thripunithura. Thus Thripunithura became the capital of the Cochin Royal Family.

== List of Maharajas of Cochin ==
Veerakerala Varma, nephew of Cheraman Perumal, is the person traditionally believed to be the first Maharaja of Cochin. The written records of the dynasty, however, date from 1503 CE. The Maharaja of Cochin was also called Gangadhara Kovil Adhikaarikal, meaning head of all temples. The kings followed matrilineal system of inheritance.

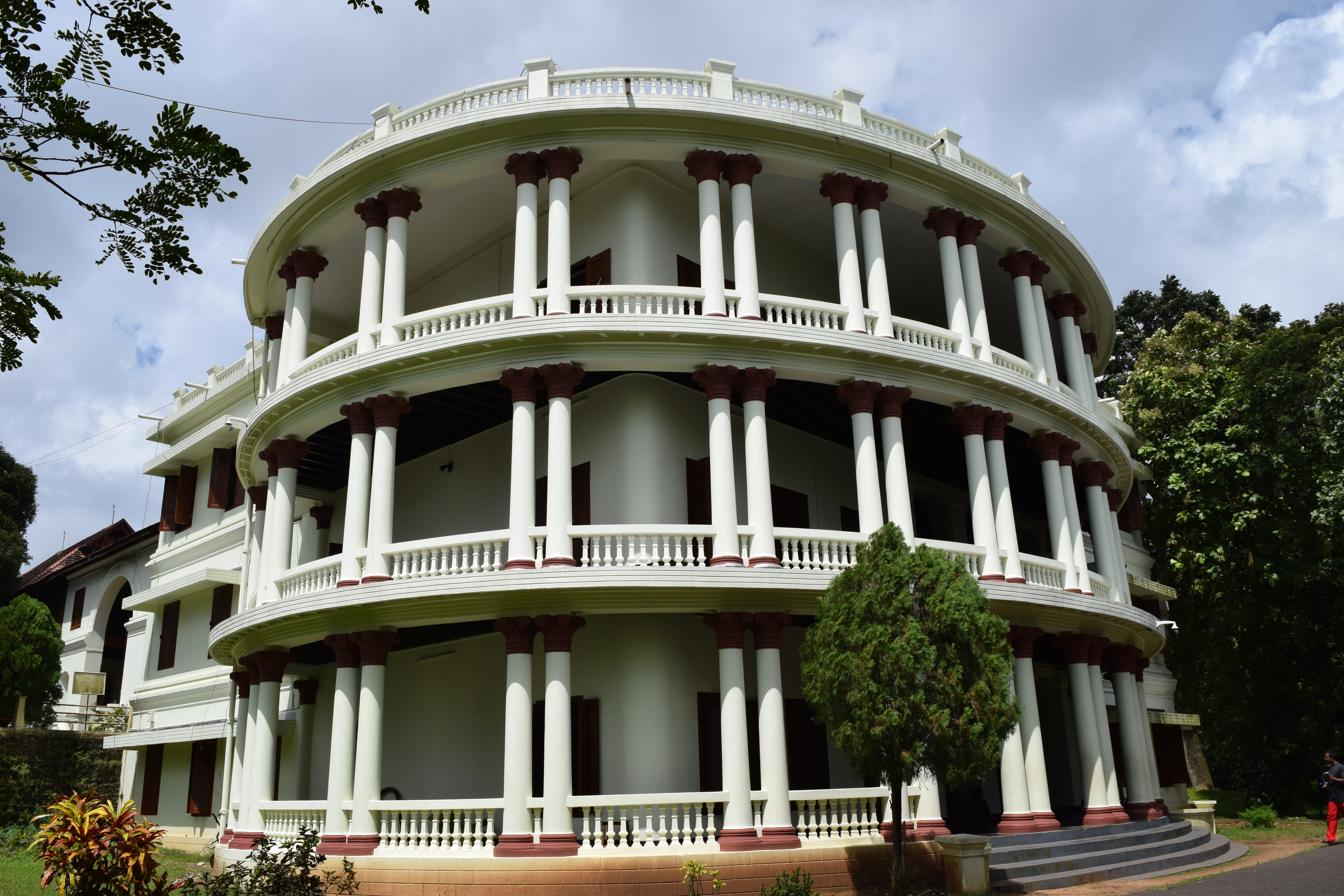
Hill Palace, the main palace

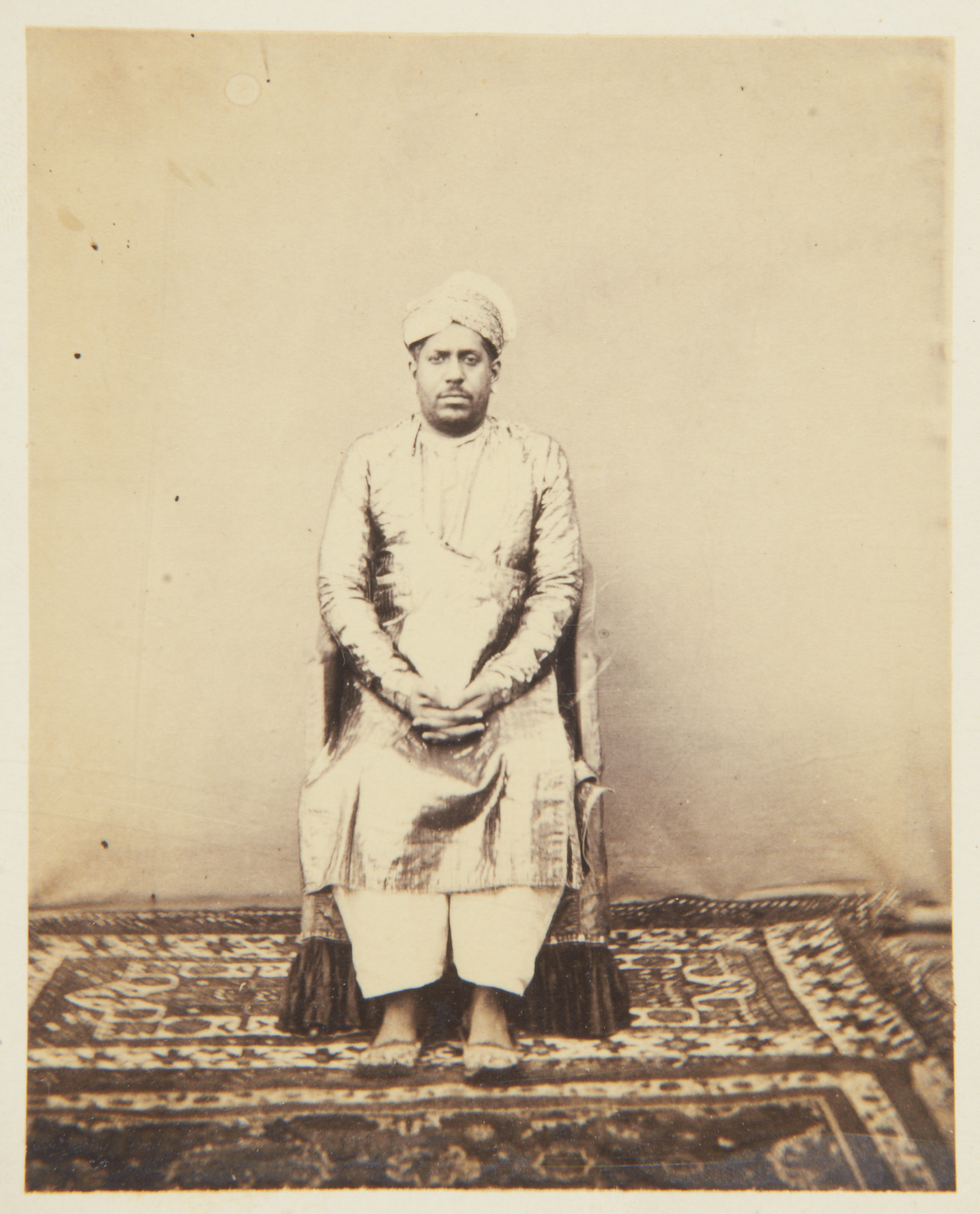
Rama Varma XIV, The Rajah of Cochin in 1868

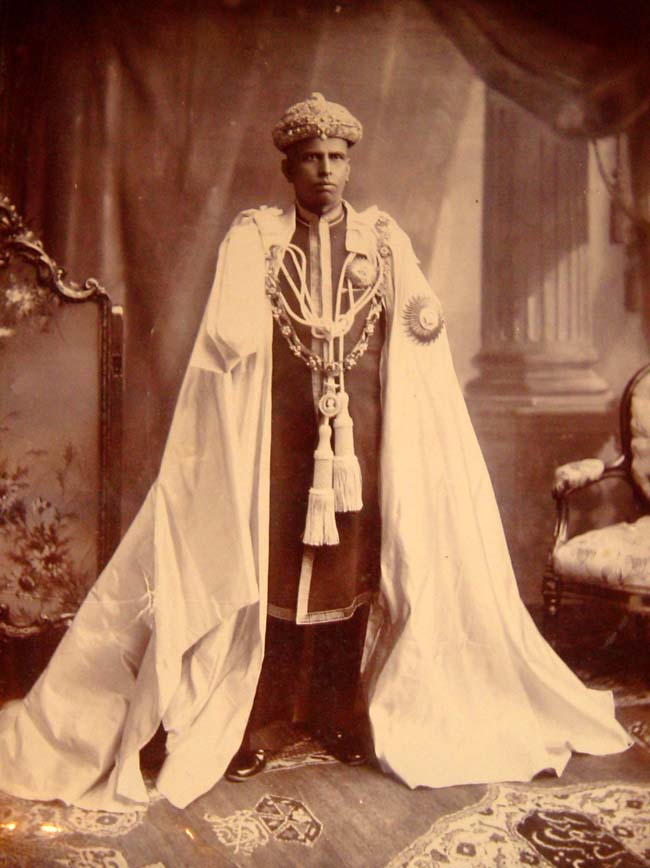
Rama Varma XV better known as His Abdicated Highness

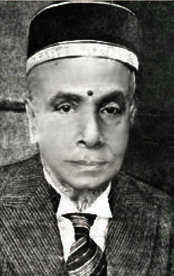
Maharaja Kerala Varma Thampuran a.k.a. Aikya Keralam Thampuran

=== As a Portuguese ally ===
1. Unni Goda Varma (?-1503)
2. Unniraman Koyikal II (1503-1537)
3. Veera Kerala Varma I (1537–1565)
4. Keshava Rama Varma (1565–1601)
5. Veera Kerala Varma II (1601–1615)
6. Ravi Varma I (1615–1624)
7. Veera Kerala Varma III (1624–1637)
8. Goda Varma I (1637–1645)
9. Veerarayira Varma (1645–1646)
10. Veera Kerala Varma IV (1646–1650)
11. Rama Varma I (1650–1656)
12. Rani Gangadharalakshmi (1656–1658, regency)
13. Rama Varma II (1658–1662)
14. Goda Varma II (1662–1663)

=== As a Dutch ally ===
1. Veera Kerala Varma V (1663–1687)
2. Rama Varma III (1687–1693)
3. Ravi Varma II (1693–1697)
4. Rama Varma IV (1697–1701)
5. Rama Varma V (1701–1721)
6. Ravi Varma III (1721–1731)
7. Rama Varma VI (1731–1746)
8. Kerala Varma I (1746–1749)
9. Rama Varma VII (1749–1760)
10. Kerala Varma II (1760–1775)
11. Rama Varma VIII (1775–1790)
12. Rama Varma IX (Shaktan Thampuran) (1790–1805)

=== As a British princely state ===
1. Rama Varma X (1805–1809) – Vellarapalli-yil Theepetta Thampuran
2. Kerala Varma III (Veera Kerala Varma) (1809–1828) – Karkidaka Maasathil Theepetta Thampuran
3. Rama Varma XI (1828–1837) – Thulam-Maasathil Theepetta Thampuran
4. Rama Varma XII (1837–1844) – Edava-Maasathil Theepetta Thampuran
5. Rama Varma XIII (1844–1851) – Thrishur-il Theepetta Thampuran
6. Kerala Varma IV (Veera Kerala Varma) (1851–1853) – Kashi-yil Theepetta Thampuran
7. Ravi Varma IV (1853–1864) – Makara Maasathil Theepetta Thampuran
8. Rama Varma XIV (1864–1888) – Mithuna Maasathil Theepetta Thampuran
9. Kerala Varma V (1888–1895) – Chingam Maasathil Theepetta Thampuran
10. Rama Varma XV (Sir Sri Rama Varma) (1895–1914) – aka Rajarshi, Abdicated Highness
11. Rama Varma XVI (1914–1932) – Madrasil Theepetta Thampuran
12. Rama Varma XVII (1932–1941) – Dhaarmika Chakravarthi, Chowara-yil Theepetta Thampuran
13. Kerala Varma VI (1941–1943) – Midukkan Thampuran
14. Ravi Varma V (1943–1946) – Kunjappan Thampuran
15. Kerala Varma VII (1946–1948) – Aikya Keralam Thampuran
16. Rama Varma XVIII (1948–1964) was known by the name of Parikshith Thampuran. He was the last official ruler of the princely state of Cochin. He had signed, in 1949, the accession agreement to Indian Union. The integration was completed in another year.

=== Post-independence (Titular only) ===
1. Rama Varma XVIII (1948–1964) was known by the name of Parikshith Thampuran.
2. Rama Varma XIX (1964–1975) – Lalan Thampuran – stripped of official recognition in 1971 under the 26th Amendment by Indira Gandhi's Government.
3. Ravi Varma (1975–1983)
4. Rama Varma Kuttappan Thampuran (1983-1985)
5. Kerala Varma Kashi Appan Thampuran (1986-1990)
6. Kerala Varma Aniyan Kochunni Thampuran (1990-2004)
7. Kerala Varma VIII (2004–2004) Only Six Months – Kochunni Thampuran
8. Rama Varma XXI (2011–2014) – Kochaniyan Thampuran
9. Ravi Varma VI (2014–2020) – Kochaniyan Thampuran
10. Ravi Varma VII (Seeri) (2020–2024)
11. Kerala Varma Kunjikuttan Thampuran (2024-2025)
12. Ravi Varma (RTRV) (2025 Present)

== Prime ministers of Cochin (1947–49) ==
No. (Note: A parenthetical number indicates that the incumbent has previously held office.)	Name	Portrait	Term of office			Party	Assembly	Appointed by (Monarch)
No.	Name	Portrait	From	To	Days in office	Party	Assembly	Appointed by (Monarch)
1	Panampilly Govinda Menon		14 August 1947	22 October 1947	51 days	Independent	Sixth Council (1945–48)	Kerala Varma VII, Maharaja of Cochin
2	T. K. Nair		27 October 1947	20 September 1948	334 days	Independent	Sixth Council (1945–48)	Kerala Varma VII, Maharaja of Cochin
3	E. Ikkanda Warrier		20 September 1948	30 June 1949	283 days	Independent	Legislative Assembly (1948–49)	Kerala Varma VII, Maharaja of Cochin

== Chiefs of Cochin ==
The Paliath Achan of the Paliam family of Chendamangalam, played an important part in the politics of Cochin State since the early seventeenth century, and held hereditary rights to the ministership of Cochin. The Paliath Achan was the most powerful person after the king, and he sometimes exerted more power than the king. The Paliyam swaroopam, was second to the Perumpadappu swaroopam in terms of power but much larger in terms of wealth and land owned.

Other powerful lords around these areas were Cheranellore Karthavu who was the head of the Anchi Kaimals, Muriyanatt (Mukundapuram-Nadavarambu) Nambiar who was the head of Arunattil Prabhus, Kodassery Kartha Mappranam Prabhu-Vellose Nair, Changaramponnath Kartha, Chengazhi Nambiar (Chengazhinad Naduvazhi), and Edappali Nampiyathiri.

KP Padmanabha Menon in his History of Kerala, Vol 2 mentions the Anji Kaimals whose Chief was the Cheranellur Kartha as owning all of Eranakulam. In fact, Eranakulam is known as Anji Kaimal in the early maps of Kerala. See Dutch in Malabar (Dutch Records No 13), 1910 shows a map from Common Era1740 that shows the area of AnjiKaimal as almost twice as large as the Cochin State. The other chiefs he mentions quoting Gollennesse (Dutch East India Company) is the 1) Moorianatt Nambiar 2) Paliath Achan (mentioned above), 3)Codacherry (Kotasseri) Kaimal, 4) Caimalieone (female Kaimal) of Corretty, 5) Changera Codda Kaimal, and 6) Panamoocattu Kaimal (Panambakadu Kaimal). The last four Kaimals are known as the Kaimals of Nandietter Nadu. The Kaimals of Nandietter Nadu had Nayar troops of 43,000 according to Heer Van Reede of the Dutch East India Company from 1694.

== Matrilineal inheritance ==
The Cochin royal family followed the system of matrilineal succession known as Marumakkatayam. Traditionally the female members of the family marry with Namboodiri Brahmins while male members marry women of the Nair/Menon class. These wives of the male members are not Ranis or Queens as per the matrilineal system but instead get the title of Nethyar Amma.

== Traditional rituals ==
The term "Shodasakriyakal" refers to sixteen rites to be performed by all members, as structured through "Smruthi".

1. Sekom (Garbhaadhaanam): A rite to be performed just before the first sexual intercourse after marriage.
2. Pumsavanom: To be performed just after conception.
3. Seemantham: Performed after Pumsavanom.
4. Jathakarmam: Performed just after birth.
5. Naamakaranam: Naming ceremony of the child.
6. (Upa)nishkramanam (Vaathilpurappadu): Involves taking the child out of the house for the first time.
7. Choroonu: The first ceremonial intake of rice by the child.
8. Choulam: The first haircut ceremony of the boy/ girl.
9. Upanayanam: The wearing of sacred thread, known as poonool in Malayalam (only for boys).
10. Mahaanamneevrutham (Aanduvrutham):
11. Mahaavrutham
12. Upanishadvrutham
13. Godaanam: Rites as part of thanks-giving to the Aacharyan (priest or teacher), which includes giving cows.
14. Samaavarthanam: A long ritual for the completion of the above said Vedic education.
15. Marriage
16. Agniadhaanam: A rite performed as an extension of Oupaasanam and introduction to Sroutha rites, after the death.

=== Deities ===
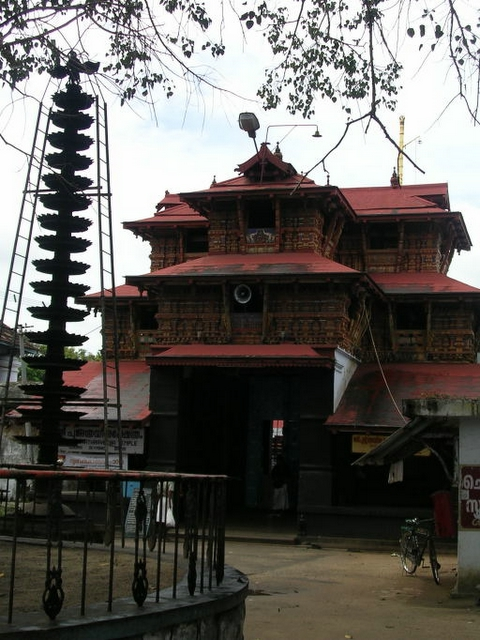
Sree Poornathrayeesa Temple

- Paradevatha (goddess): Vannery Chitrakoodam, Pazhayannur Bhagavathy, Chazhur Pazhayannur Bhagavathy
- Paradevan (god): Vishnu (Sree Poornathrayeesa), Tiruvanchikulathappan (Lord Shiva of Thiruvanchikulam between North Paravur and Kodungallore)
- Other deities: Chottanikkara Bhagavathy, Pulpalli Thevar and many more

=== Naming practice of male Thampuran ===
In the Cochin royal family all the male Thampurans were named according to the following convention.

- Eldest son – Rama Varma
- Second son – Kerala Varma
- Third son – Ravi Varma
- Fourth son - Rama Varma

=== Naming practice of female Thampuran ===
In the Cochin royal family the female Thampurans were named according to the following convention.

- First daughter – Amba
- Second daughter – Subhadra

This naming convention is followed again to the third daughter and fourth etc.

Both the female and male members are called by the name "Thampuran" and have same last name (Thampuran).

== Parukutty Nethyar Amma ==
Maharaja Rama Varma (popularly known as Madrassil Theepetta Thampuran), who reigned from 1914 to 1932, was assisted by a particularly able consort named Parukutty Nethyar Amma. She was a member of the famous Thrissur Vadakke Kurupath family which was an aristocratic Nair/Menon family. Her father Kuroor Narayanan Namboothirippad, belonged to a family that traditionally had the honour of anointing the Kings of Palakkad. She married the Maharaja, then fourth in line to the succession when she was fourteen years old in 1888. Her husband ascended the throne as a result of the abdication of his predecessor. Since the Maharaja was a scholar and had other interests, she took over the finances of the state. Under her guidance salaries were quadrupled and the increased revenue earned her a 17-gun salute. Parukutty Nethyar Amma was awarded the Kaiser-i-Hind Medal by King George V in 1919 for public work and came to be known as Lady Rama Varma of Cochin.

== Cochin royal family today ==
Members of the dynasty are spread all over the world. The family is one of the world's largest royal families, numbering more than 1,000 people, and many members of the family still live in and around Thripunithura, Thrissur (Chazhur), and other parts of Kochi. The current head of the Royal Family of Cochin is Smt. Mrinalini Thampuran (b. 1925) who is 100 years old and resides in Tripunithura. Other known family members include Dr Kocha Varma, Dr Chris Kerala Varma

== Gallery ==
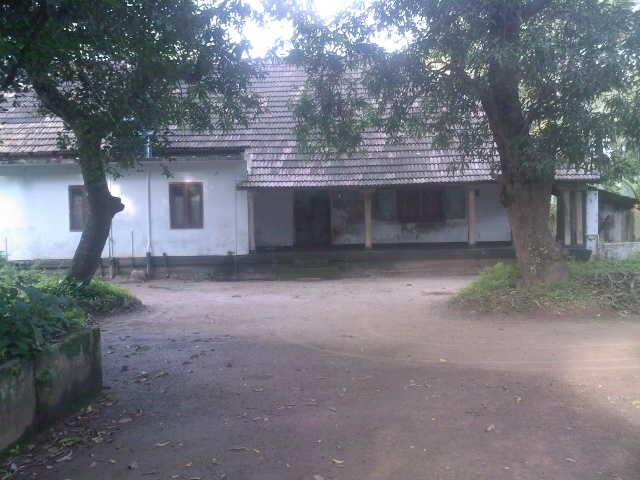
Chazhoor village holds the ancient palace of Chazhoor (Chazur) kovilakom. This is the root (moola thavazhi) of the Cochin royal family, in Thrissur district (Perumpadappu swaroopam).

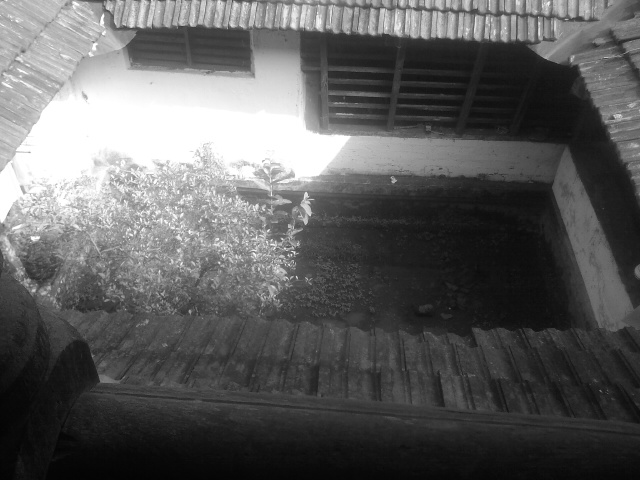
Vadakke kettu (nalukettu in the north side of the Palace)

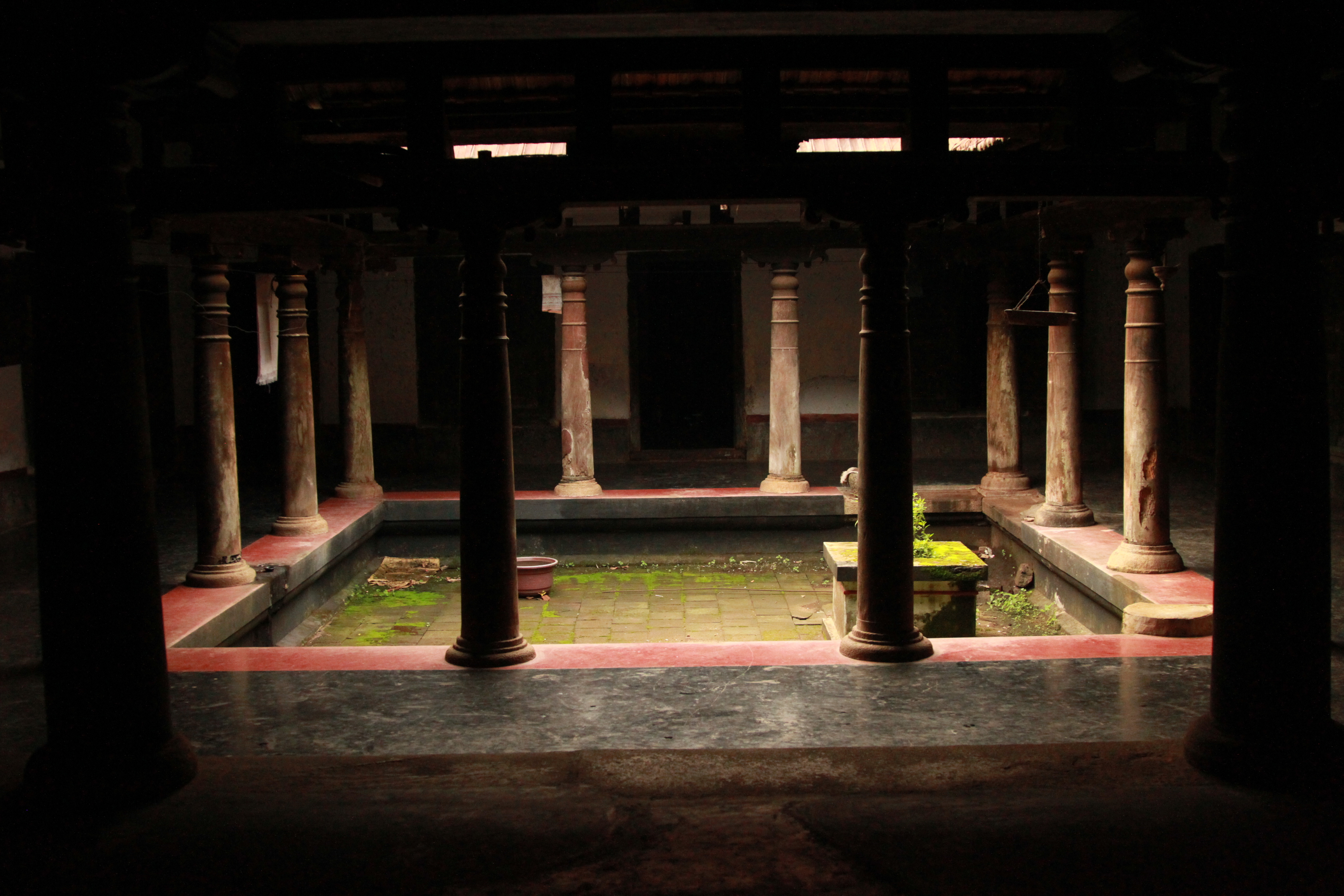
The Naalukettu (Kerala style of joint family house) of Chazhoor royal family is in this village.

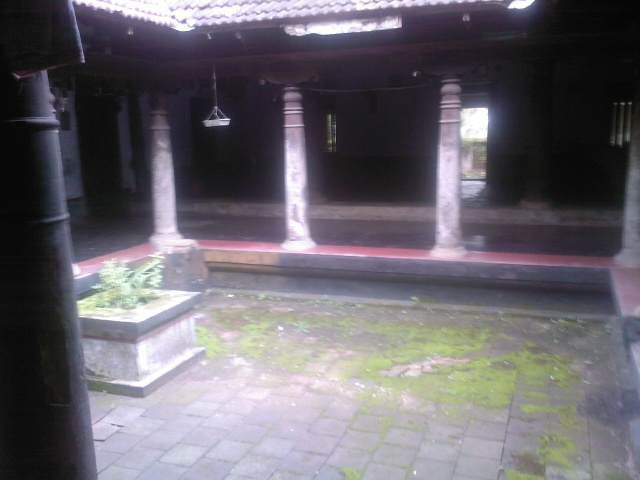
Nalukettu

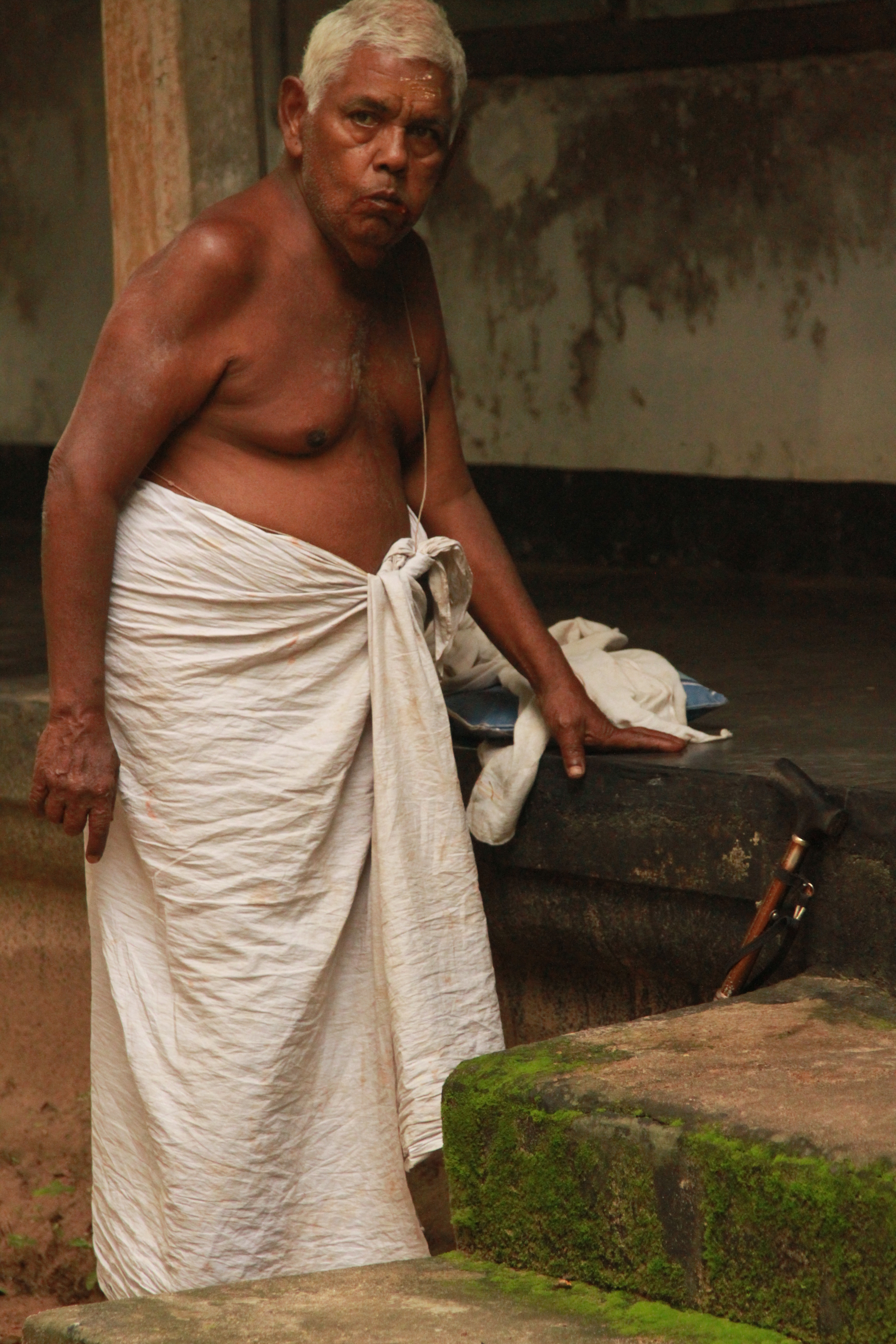
Late Shri KeralaVarma Appukuttan Thampuran (1943–2012), a member of Chazhur Kovilakam

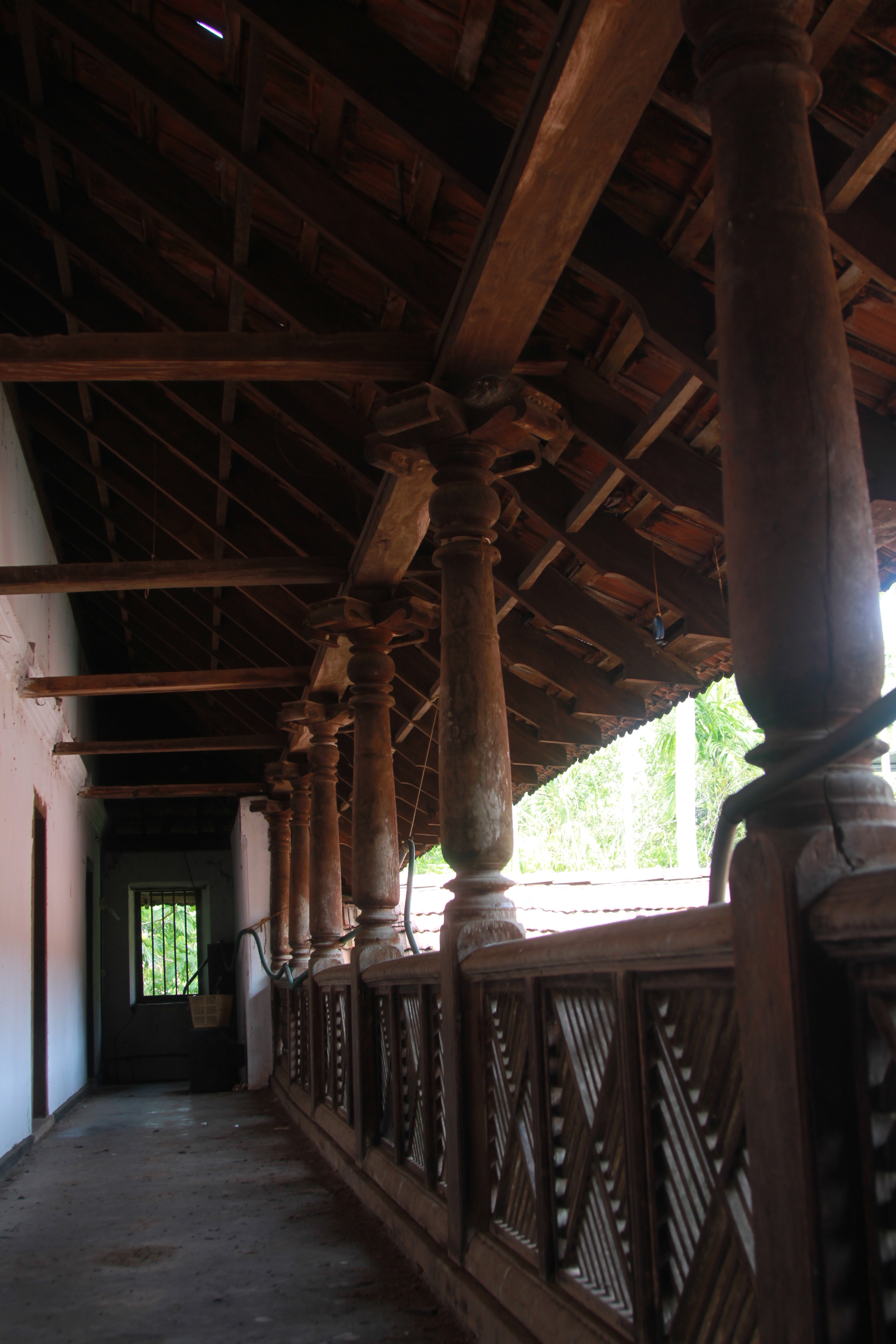
Chazhur Kovilakam Vadakkekettu – Maalika

== See also ==
- Zamorin of Calicut
- Political integration of India
- History of Kochi
- British India
- Thrippunithura
- Paliath Achan
- Perumpadappu
- Ponnani

== Bibliography ==
- Katz, Nathan and Goldberg, Helen S. Kashrut, Caste and Kabbalah: The Religious Life of the Jews of Cochin. Mahonar Books, 2005.
- Kulke, Herman. A History of India. New York: Routledge, 2004.
- Menon, P. Shungoonny. History of Travancore from the Earliest Times. 1878.
- Pillai, Elamkulam Kunjan. Studies in Kerala History. Kottayam, 1970.
- Ramachandran, Rathi. History of Medieval Kerala. Pragati Publications, 2005.
- Thampuran, Rameshan. Genealogy of Cochin Royal Family.
- History of Kerala, KP Padmanabha Menon, Vol. 2.
- Chazhoor Copperplate, S. Rajendu, Kottayam, 2015.
