= Puthenpeedika =

Puthenpeedika Irumbrayur
- village
- Location in Kerala, India Puthenpeedika (India)
- Coordinates: 10°26′0″N 76°7′0″E
- Country: India
- State: Kerala
- District: Thrissur

Languages
  - Official: Malayalam, English
- Time zone: UTC+5:30 (IST)
- PIN: 680642
- Telephone code: 0487
- Vehicle registration: KL-08
- Nearest city: Thrissur
- Literacy: 100%
- Lok Sabha constituency: Thrissur

Puthenpeedika is a small south Indian village in the Thrissur district of the Indian state of Kerala. It is located 17 km from the town of Thrissur. The towns of Anthikad, Chazhur and Peringottukara are also nearby.

== History ==
Puthenpeedika was an ancient marketplace, destroyed many years ago. The ancient name of Puthenpeedika is Irumbrayur. This name is connected to the Chera dynasty. The Chera rulers Irumborai family and this place had some connection. Irumbrayur was the capital of the Irumborai dynasty, sited along the river 'Vann Puzhai', Vappuzha, which translates to "big river". The trading port of Irumbrayur was located on this river. After the Great Flood in 1343, the river was diverted from the Vappuzha and lost its trade importance to the Irumbrayur. No evidence links the Chera kingdom and Irumrayur without that name.
