= Rama Varma XVI =

Ruler of the Kingdom of Cochin from 1915 to 1932

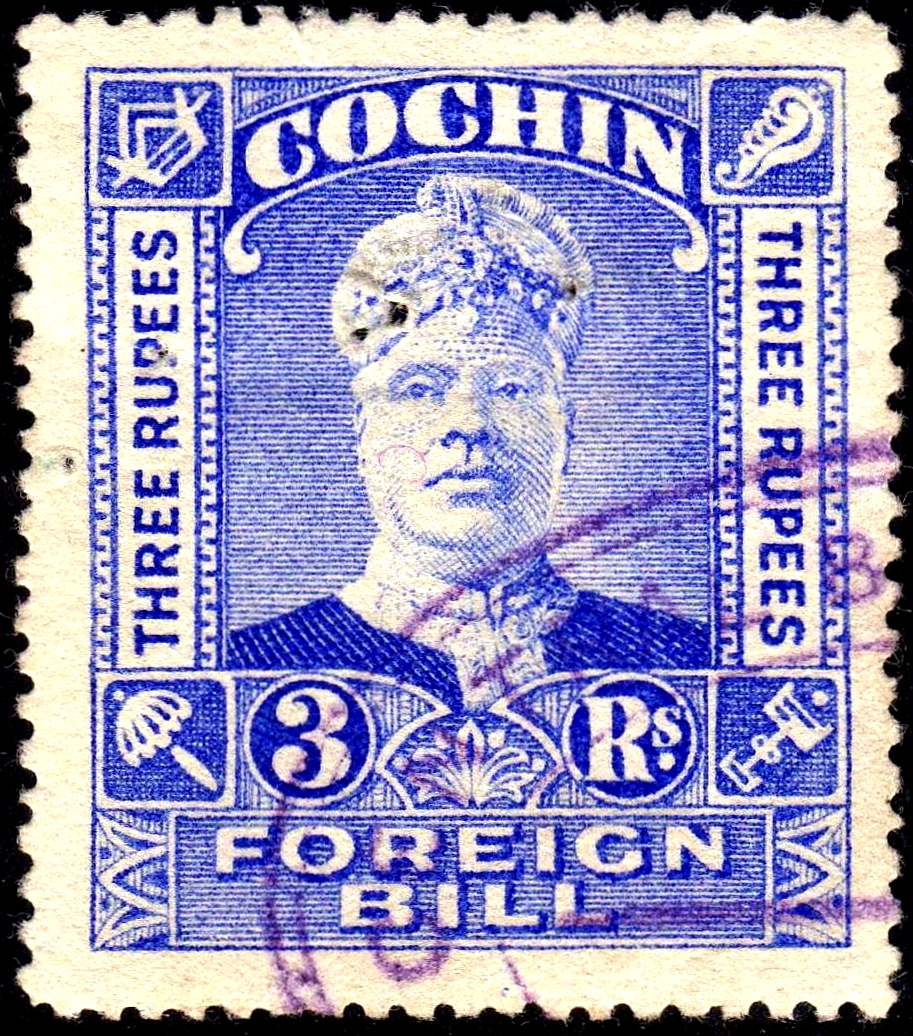
Maharaja Rama Varma XVI on a revenue stamp of Cochin

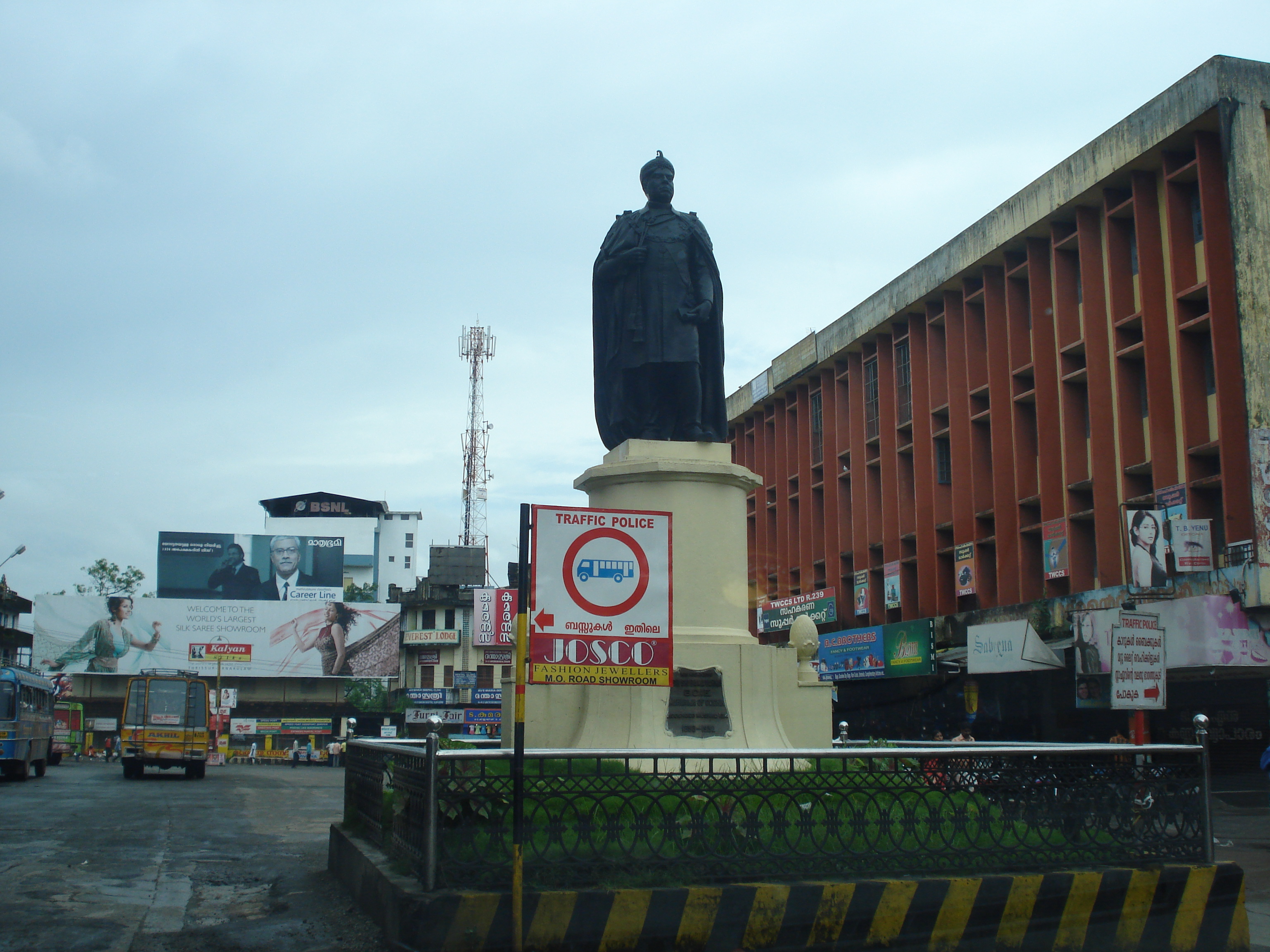
Statue of Rama Varma XVI in Thrissur city

Sir Sri Rama Varma XVI GCIE (1858 – 21 March 1932) was the ruler of the Kingdom of Cochin from 1915 to 1932.

== Reign ==
Rama Varma XVI succeeded Rama Varma XV upon his abdication in 1914, ruling from 25 January 1915 until his death on 21 March 1932. He was married to Parukutty Nethyar Amma.

As king, Varma XVI ordered the Thitooram (Royal writ) to build a church within the premises of Thrissur. This church is still extant today as the Basilica of Our Lady of Dolours.

=== Death ===
Rama Varma died on 21 March 1932 in Madras, aged 74. Because he died at Madras, he is therefore known as 'Madrasil Theepetta Thamburan'.

Regnal titles
Preceded by Rama Varma XV	Maharaja of Cochin; 1915–1932	Succeeded by Rama Varma XVII
