= Lalan Thampuran =

Maharaja of Cochin (1887–1975)

"Lalan" Rama Varma Kunjikidavu Thampuran (1887–1975), formally Rama Varma XIX, was the last Maharaja of Cochin, from 1964 to 1971, and was Valiya Thampuran of the Perumpadappu Swaroopam from 1964 to 1975. His consort Nethyaramma was V. K. Krishna Menon's sister, granddaughter to the last Koothali Nair, and the Porlathiri Raja of Kadathanadu. He made his residence at Krishnavilasam in Ernakulam, and did not elect to move into the Hill Palace at Tripunithura, which was soon sold.

His tenure saw extended litigation over the corporate nature of the sthanam of Maharaja, and the forced firesale liquidation of the royal Perumpadappu holdings, despite poor price discovery and interference from the Kerala state government, courtesy of the statutory abolition of the Hindu joint family in Kerala. An inventory of real assets to be sold or partitioned documented dozens of palaces, manses, temples, and guesthouses, in various states of repair, which were surrendered to the state if possible for preservation.

Regnal titles
Preceded by Rama Varma XV	Maharaja of Cochin or Valiya Thampuran; 1964-1975	Succeeded by Rama Varma XX (in pretence)
