= Rama Varma XVII =

Maharaja of Cochin

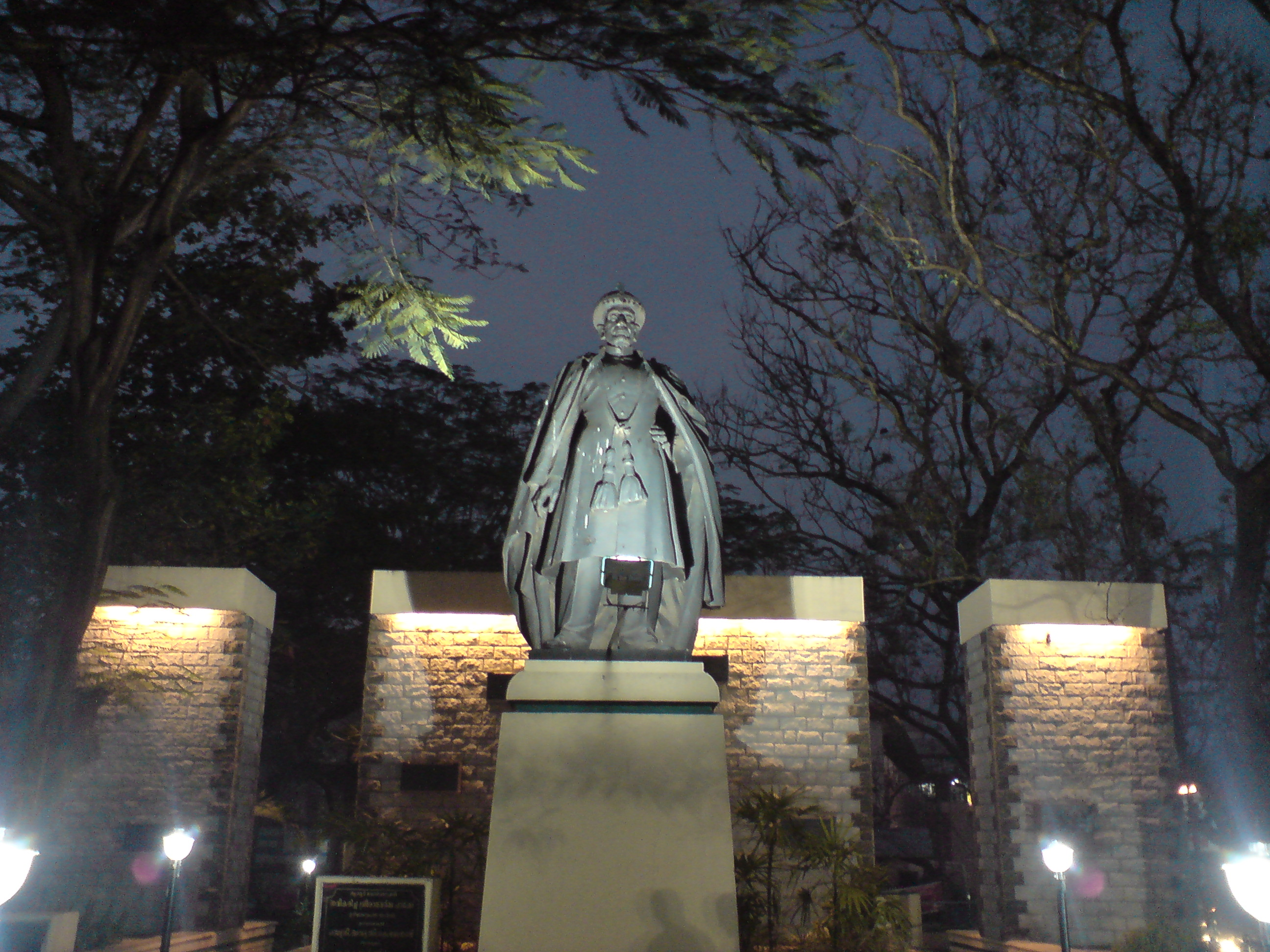
Statue of Rama Varma XVII, Maharaja of Cochin at the Ramavarma Park in Thrissur City

Rama Varma XVII GCIE (c. 1861 – 23 May 1941) was the ruler of the Kingdom of Cochin from 25 March 1932 to 23 May 1941.

== Reign ==
Rama Varma ascended the throne on the death of Rama Varma XVI. The Cochin harbour was expanded and the Ernakulam High Court was established during his reign. Rama Varma also showed keen interest in religious and spiritual matters.

== Death ==
Rama Varma died at Chowwara on 23 May 1941.

Regnal titles
Preceded by Rama Varma XVI	Maharaja of Cochin; 1932–1941	Succeeded by Kerala Varma VI
