= Basic People's Congress =

Basic People's Congress is a term related to the former Libyan political system. It can refer to one of the following:

- Basic People's Congress (administrative division), the geographic district
- Basic People's Congress (political), the government of the district
