= Ravi Varma V =

Maharaja of Cochin, India

Maharaja Gangadahra Koviladhikarikal Sri Ravi Varma (1865–1946) was the Maharaja of Cochin, India in 1943–46.

Ravi Varma was born on 29 November 1865, in Tripunithura, then part of British India. Maharaja Gangadahra Koviladhikarikal Sri Ravi Varma ruled Cochin from 1943 to 1946. He was the Elaya Raja (crown prince) until his brother Midukkan Thampuran died on 13 October 1943. He ascended the throne at the age of 78 years. Although his reign was short, he was very popular with the people of Cochin. He was known for his spirit of equality, and the way he got along with the common people despite the vast economic inequality prevailing in those times. A very well educated man for his time, he was fluent in English, Hindi, Malayalam, Sanskrit and to some extent Urdu. Maharaja Ravi Varma was admired for his painting skills and was very well versed in oil painting. Maharaja Ravi Varma was possibly also a famous player of Polo during his youth.

Ravi Varma V was married to Kamakshi Nethiyar. They had four children: Balagopalan, Chandrasekharan, DevakiNandanan and UmaLakshmi Amma. Their daughter UmaLakShmi Amma married Rama Varma Thampuran and gave birth to Valia Thampuran of the Cochin Royal Family SaradaMani Varma.

Maharaja Ravi Varma died of natural causes in 1946 at the age of 81 years (Makara 18th, 1121 M.E), in Tripunithura. A 17 gun salute was given to him. His Maternal Cousin, Maharaja Sri Kerala Varma, popularly known as Ikyakeralam Thampuran ascended to the throne after his death.

Regnal titles
| Preceded by Kerala Varma VI | Maharaja of Cochin; 1943–1946 | Succeeded by Kerala Varma VII |
