= Pumsavana =

Hindu rite of passage during early pregnancy

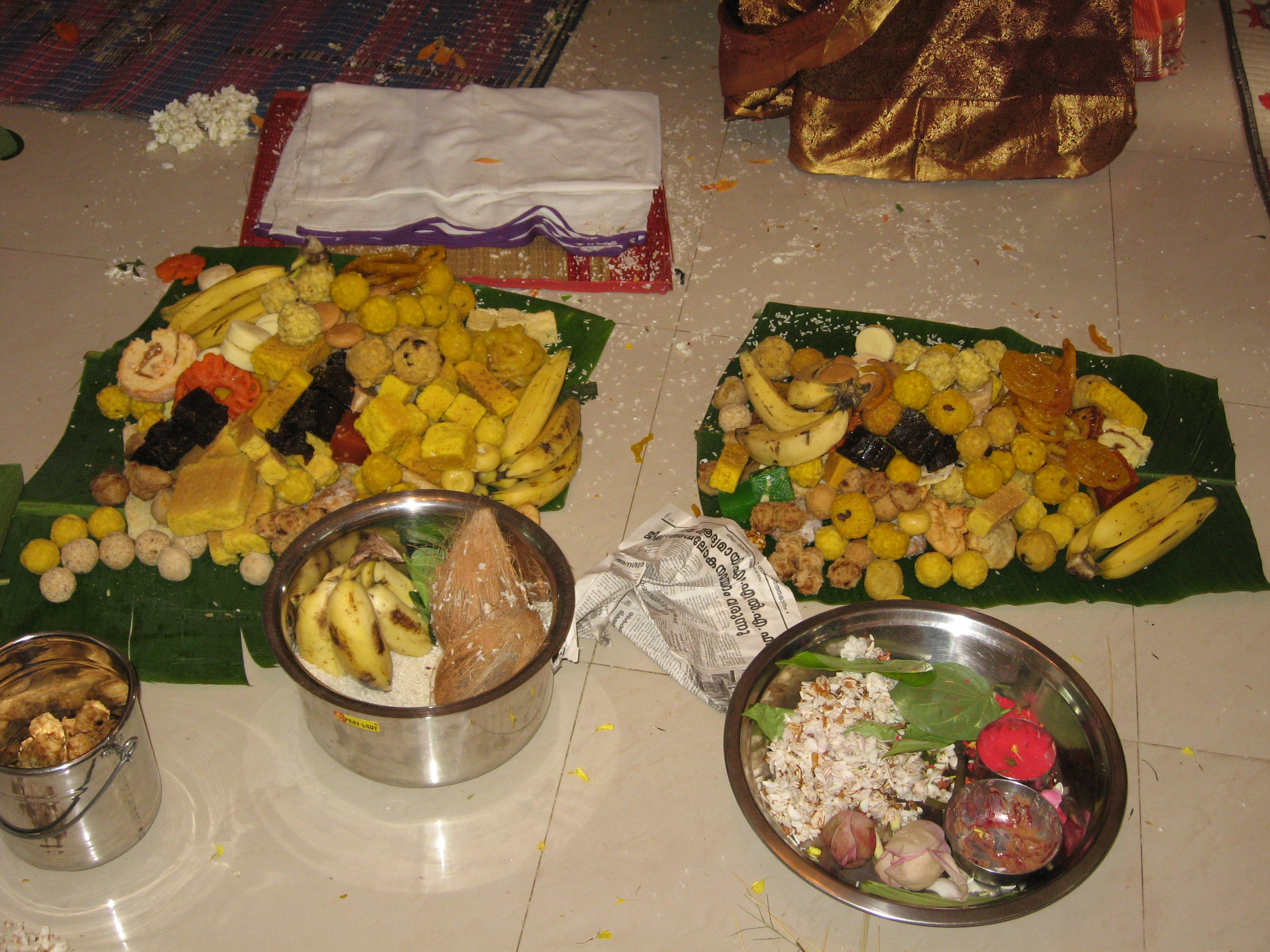
Different varieties of sweets served on a Pumsavana function in Kerala.

Pumsavana (Sanskrit: पुंसवन, Puṁsavana) (literally: quickening the fetus, or engendering a male or female issue) is the second of the 16 saṃskāras (sacraments, rite of passage) in ancient texts of Hinduism. The rite of passage is celebrated in the third or fourth month of pregnancy, typically after the pregnancy begins to show but before the baby begins to move in the womb.

== Background ==
Pumsavana is one of the 16 samskara in Hinduism, which are rites of deciding the gender of the fetus in early stages of a woman's pregnancy (third or fourth month), early steps for his welcome into the world in the presence of friends and family, then various stages of life (Ashrama) such as first learning day, graduation from school, wedding and honeymoon, pregnancy, raising a family, as well as those related to final rites associated with cremation. These rites of passage are not uniform, and vary within the diverse traditions of Hinduism. Some may involve formal ceremonies, yajna (fire) ceremonies with the chanting of Vedic hymns. Others are simple, private affairs.

These rites of passage in Hinduism are found in the numerous Dharmasutras and Grhyasutras dated from the 1st millennium BCE.

== Description ==
Pumsavana (Sanskrit: पुंसवन) is a composite word of Pums + savana. Pums mean "to grind, move", and "a human being, a soul or spirit", while savana means "ceremony, rite, oblation, festival". Pumsavana thus literally means "quickening a being, soul", and it is usually translated as "quickening a male or female fetus, bringing forth a male or female baby".

Pumsavana is a rite of passage observed when the pregnancy begins to show, typically in or after the third month of pregnancy and usually before the fetus starts moving in the womb. The ceremony celebrates the rite of passage of the developing fetus, marking the stage where the baby begins to kick as a milestone in a baby's development.

=== Literature ===
The roots of the pumsavana ritual are found in section 4.3.23 and 4.6.2 of the Atharva Veda, wherein charms are recited for a baby boy. The Atharva Veda also contains charms to be recited for the birth of a child of either gender and the prevention of miscarriages, such as in section 4.6.17.

The Atharva Veda, includes thousands of chapters, with diverse scope and prayers. In many verses, the prayer or charm is aimed to have a child, of either sex. For example, in verse 14.2.2, the Atharva Veda states a ritual invitation to the wife, by her husband to mount the bed for conception, "being happy in mind, here mount the bed; give birth to children for me, your husband". Texts, such as the Brihadaranyaka Upanishad, in the last chapter detailing the education of a student, include lessons for his Grihastha stage of life. There, the student is taught, that as a husband, he should cook rice for the wife, and they together eat the food in certain way depending on whether they wish for the birth of a daughter or a son, as follows,

== Ceremony ==
The ritual is performed in diverse ways, but all involve the husband serving something to the expectant wife. In one version, she is fed a paste mixture of yoghurt, milk and ghee (clarified butter) by him. In another version, the pumsavana ritual is more elaborate, done in the presence of yajna fire and vedic chants, where the husband places a drop of Banyan leaf extract in the wife's right nostril for a son, and her left nostril for a daughter, followed by a feast for all present.
