= Chazhoor =

Chazhoor Chazhur Chazhur
- village
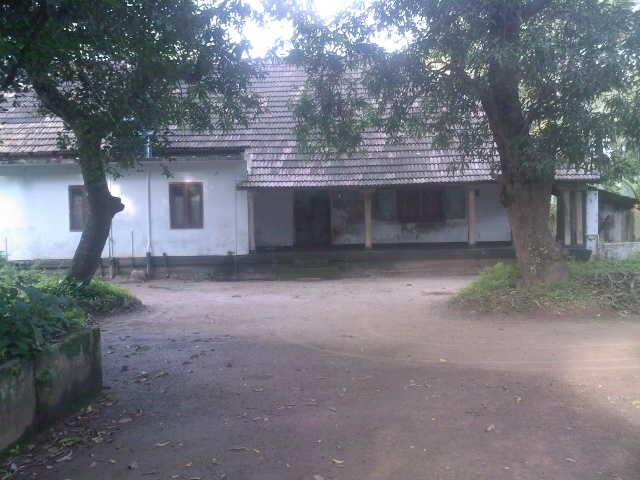
- Chazhur Kovilakam
- Interactive map of Chazhoor
- Coordinates: 10.4451800°N 76.136970°E
- Country: India
- State: Kerala
- District: Thrissur

Government
  - Body: Chazhur Grama Panchayath, Thanniyam Grama Panchayath

Population (2011)
  - Total: 5,827

Languages
  - Official: Malayalam, English
- Time zone: UTC+5:30 (IST)
- PIN: 680571
- Telephone code: 0487
- Vehicle registration: KL-75
- Nearest city: Triprayar

Chazhoor (Chazhur) is a village in Thrissur Taluk of Thrissur district in the state of Kerala, India. Thriprayar (4 km), Thrissur (22 km), and Chavakkad (17 km) are nearby cities.

== Demographics ==
As of 2011 India census, Chazhoor had a population of 5,827 with 2,641 males and 3,186 females.

== History ==
Chazhoor village holds the ancient palace of Chazhoor (Chazhur) kovilakom. This is the root (moola thavazhi) of the Cochin royal family, in Ernakulam district (Perumpadapu Swaroopam).

The Naalukettu (Kerala style of joint family house) of the Chazhoor royal family is in this village.

== Tourism ==
Pullu is known for its scenic Kole fields and emerging as a favourite evenig spot for hangouts.

== Civic administration and politics ==
For administrative purposes, the Chazhoor panchayat is divided into 18 wards, from which the members of the panchayat are elected for five years. In the 2025 election LDF secured the majority. Shilly Gijumon is the current president of the panchayat.

Chazhoor panchayat is part of the Thrissur Parliament constituency and Nattika Legislative constituency. As of 2024, the MP is Suresh Gopi and as of 2023, the MLA was Geetha Gopi.
