= Aikya Keralam Thampuran =

Maharaja of Cochin

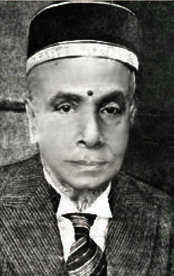
Maharaja Kerala Varma Thampuran a.k.a. Aikya Keralam Thampuran

Kerala Varma Thampuran (1870 – July 1948) popularly known as Aikya Keralam Thampuran or Kerala Varma VII was the Maharaja (king) of Cochin who ruled between 1946 and 1949. He mooted the idea of a unified Kerala state in India for the Malayalam speaking population and stood for the merging of British Malabar, Cochin and Travancore. Therefore, he was given the sobriquet Ikyakeralam Thampuran (King who united Kerala). He died in July 1948 (1123 Midhunam 25th according to the Malayalam calendar). He was also the brain behind the formation of Sree Kerala Varma College at Thrissur, named after him.

== Biography ==
Born in 1870, he ruled the Kingdom of Cochin from 1946.

Kerala Varma, the Maharaja of Cochin, played a pivotal role in the unification of Kerala and the accession of the Kingdom of Cochin to the Indian Union. In April 1947, he inaugurated the Aikya Kerala Convention held in Thrissur under the chairmanship of K. Kelappan. The convention passed a resolution for the formation of a 'United Kerala'. He was later known as the 'Aikya Keralam Thampuran' for his stand for the amalgamation of Malabar District, Cochin and Travancore to form a unified Kerala state.

He died in July 1948.

Regnal titles
| Preceded by Ravi Varma V | Maharaja of Cochin; 1946–1948 | Succeeded by Rama Varma XVIII |
