= Indian People's Congress =

Political party in India

The Indian People's Congress (IPC) is a political party in India, registered with the Election Commission of India on March 30, 1993. The life and mission of Indian People's Congress is to serve the human evolutionary cause. To serve this cause, the party advocates the establishing of a new political system to provide an economic, political and cultural ambience conducive to a rapid human biological and spiritual evolutionary march. The party's vision is guided by Sri Aurobindo and in its work it has no consideration for the difference of nationality, race, religion or ideology. It follows the policy of cooperation with all political, social, economic and cultural forces that are advancing this evolutionary cause, whether within India or outside India, and in its mission it exclusively relies on the strength of information technology. The party is a decentralized network of volunteers who are committed to fulfil this mission democratically through the technologically empowered people.
