= Rama Varma =

The name Rama Varma refers to a number of persons from many royal families of Kerala in southern India.

Members of Chera Perumals of Makotai:

- Rama Kulasekhara (a.k.a. Rama Varma Kulashekhara) (11th-12th century AD)

Maharajas of the Kingdom of Cochin:

- Rama Varma Sakthan Thampuran (Rama Varma IX) (1751–1805)
- Rama Varma X
- Rama Varma XI
- Rama Varma XII
- Rama Varma XIII
- Rama Varma XIV
- Rama Varma XV (Sir Sri Rama Varma a.k.a. Rajarshi and Abdicated Highness of Cochin (1852–1932)
- Rama Varma XVI
- Rama Varma XVII
- Rama Varma Parikshith Thampuran (Rama Varma XVIII) (died 1964)
- Lalan Thampuran (Rama Varma XIX) (1887–1975)

Maharajas of the Travancore royal family:

- Rama Varma of Venad (r. 1724–1729)
- Dharma Raja (Dharma Raja Rama Varma) (1724–1798)
- Swathi Thirunal Rama Varma (Rama Varma III) 1813–1846)
- Moolam Thirunal Rama Varma (born 1949)

== See also ==
- Rama (disambiguation)
- Varma (disambiguation)
- Ravi Varma (disambiguation)
- Kerala Varma (disambiguation)
- Aswathi Thirunal Rama Varma (Prince Rama Varma) (born 1968), musician from Travancore royal family
- Rama Varma Kochaniyan Thampuran, cricketer and tennis player from the Cochin royal family
- Ramavarmapuram, suburb of Thrissur, Kerala, India
- Ramavarma Appan Thampuran Memorial, monument in Ayyanthole, Thrissur, Kerala, India
- Ram Gopal Varma, Indian film director, screenwriter and producer
