= Kerala Varma =

The name Kerala Varma may refer to many people from many royal families from the Indian state of Kerala.

== People ==
=== Kingdom of Cochin ===
- Maharaja Veera Kerala Varma, title of the maharajas of the princely state
  - Kerala Varma III (Kerala Bhoja Raja, a.k.a. Mithuna Maasathil Theepetta Valiya Thampuran), r. 1809–1828
  - Kerala Varma IV (a.k.a. Kashiyil Theepetta Valiya Thampuran), r. 1851–1853
- Maharaja Kerala Varma Thampuran, title of the maharajas of the princely state
  - Kerala Varma V (a.k.a. Chinga Maasathil Theepetta Valiya Thampuran), r. 1888–1895
  - Kerala Varma VI (a.k.a. Midukkan Thampuran), r. 1941–1943
  - Aikya Keralam Thampuran (a.k.a. Ikyakeralam Thampuran), r. 1946–1948
- Kerala Varma Kelappan Thampuran, cricketer (born 1937)

=== Kingdom of Kottayam ===
- Pazhassi Raja (principal leader of the Cotiote War against the East India Company, 1753–1805), one of the earliest freedom fighters in India

=== Pandalam dynasty ===
- Pandalam Kerala Varma, poet and publisher (1879–1919)

=== Others ===
- Kings from the Later Chera dynasty
- Kerala Varma Valiya Koil Thampuran, poet and translator (1845–1914)
- Kevy, Indian political cartoonist

== See also ==
- Kerala (disambiguation)
- Varma (disambiguation)
- Pazhassi Raja (disambiguation)
- Rama Varma (disambiguation)
