= Varma =

Varma may refer to:

- Varma (surname), an Indian surname
- Varma (given name), a Finnish given name
- Varma kalai, traditional Indian study of anatomy
- Varma (icebreaker), a Latvian ship
- Varmaa, a 2020 Indian film directed by Bala
- D/O Varma, a 2013 Indian film
- Adithya Varma, a 2019 Indian Tamil-language drama film
- Varma Mutual Pension Insurance Company, a Finnish company (Finnish: Keskinäinen työeläkevakuutusyhtiö Varma)

== See also ==
- Rama Varma (disambiguation)
- Ravi Varma (disambiguation)
- Kerala Varma (disambiguation)
- Verma (disambiguation)
- Varman (disambiguation)
- Barma (disambiguation)
