= T. Sankara Warrier =

Diwan of Cochin

Thaikkattusery Sankara Warrier

Diwan of Cochin
- In office 1840–1856
- Monarchs: Rama Varma XII, Rama Varma XIII, Kerala Varma IV, Ravi Varma IV
- Succeeded by: Venkata Rayar

Personal details
- Born: January 1797 Ollur, Kingdom of Cochin
- Died: 23 October 1856 (age 59) Ernakulam, Kingdom of Cochin

Thaikkattusery Sankara Warrier (c. 1797 - 23 October 1856) was an Indian civil servant and administrator who served as the Diwan of the Kingdom of Cochin from 1840 to 1856. His sons T. Sankunni Menon and T. Govindan Menon have also served as Diwans of Cochin.

== Early life ==
Sankara Warrier was born in a poor Ambalavasi family in Ollur village near Trichur in January 1797. After his early schooling in Sanskrit, Warrier migrated to Ernakulam at the age of 17 and took employment as a clerk in the Appeal Court. Transferred to the Diwan's office, a year later, Warrier steadily rose to Head Rayasam (head of the correspondence department) at 24.

Warrier served as Head of Rayasam from 1821 to 1832 and Huzur Sheristadar from 1832 to 1835. In 1835, he was appointed Diwan Peishkar or Assistant Diwan and served in the post til 1840, when he succeeded Venkitasubbaya as Diwan upon his resignation.

The Kingdom of Cochin. He joined the Cochin state service as a clerk and rose to become Diwan in 1840. As Diwan he was noted for his administrative abilities, which enabled Cochin to rise to the forefront among princely states. Sankara Warrier is, especially, remembered for prevailing upon the Maharaja to issue a proclamation abolishing slavery on 16 February 1854.

== Death ==
Sankara Warrier died in 1856 and was succeeded as Diwan by Venkata Rayar.
