= Turunen =

Turunen is a Finnish surname. Notable people with the surname include:

- Antti Turunen (born 1954), the head of the Finnish Foreign Ministry's Eastern European and Central Asian department
- Aukusti Turunen (1888–1967), Finnish smallholder and politician
- Eeva Turunen (1933–2015), Finnish secondary school teacher and politician
- Emilie Turunen (born 1984), as of 2009, the youngest member of the European Parliament
- Erika Turunen, Finnish costume designer
- Hannu Turunen (born 1956), former Finnish footballer
- Heikki Turunen (born 1945), Finnish author who lives in Joensuu
- Joni Turunen (born 1976), Finnish boxer
- Juha Turunen (born 1964), Finnish lawyer who confessed to a kidnapping in 2009
- Jukka Turunen (born 1964), Finnish footballer
- Kaj Turunen (born 1960), Finnish politician
- Kari Turunen (born 1962), Finnish musician
- Mari Turunen, Finnish actress
- Marjut Turunen (born 1992), Finnish ski orienteering competitor
- Martti Turunen (born 1940), now known as Marutei Tsurunen, Finnish-born Japanese politician
- Miikka Turunen (born 1979), Finnish football player currently playing for KuPS
- Miina Turunen (born 1973), Finnish actress
- Mikko Turunen (born 1982), Finnish ice hockey player
- Minna Turunen (born 1969), Finnish actress
- Miro Turunen (born 2003), Finnish footballer
- Oiva Turunen (1910–1991), Finnish business executive and politician
- Patrik Turunen (born 1988), Finnish football player currently playing for KuPS
- Tarja Turunen (born 1977), Finnish singer-songwriter and composer
- Teemu Turunen (born 1986), Finnish footballer, who plays as a midfielder
- Tero Turunen (born 1967), Finnish freestyle skier
- Timo Turunen (born 1948), retired professional ice hockey player who played in the SM-liiga
- Tuomo Turunen (born 1987), Finnish footballer
- Unto Turunen, Finnish diplomat and lawyer
- Varma K. Turunen (1913–1994), Finnish trade union activist and politician
- Veikko Turunen (1930–2006), Finnish Lutheran clergyman and politician
- Vilho Turunen (1923–1973), Finnish agricultural worker, logger, trade union functionary and politician
