= T. Govinda Menon =

Civil servant

Thottekat Govinda Menon

Diwan of Cochin
- In office 1879–1890
- Monarchs: Rama Varma XIV, Kerala Varma V
- Preceded by: T. Sankunni Menon
- Succeeded by: C. Thiruvenkatacharya

Thottekat Govinda Menon (29 August 1823) was an Indian civil servant and administrator who served as the Diwan of Cochin kingdom from 1879 to 1890. It was during his tenure that the border between Cochin and Travancore kingdoms was settled.

Sankunni Menon was the eldest son of Kizhakke Thottekat Ammini Amma and T. Sankara Warrier who had served as the Diwan of Cochin kingdom from 1840 to 1856. Sankunni belongs to the Thottekat family through matrilineal succession. He was the younger brother of T. Sankunni Menon.

In memory of the Diwans a structure was constructed by the side of Durbar Hall Road, & it is known by the name Thottekat Diwans Memorial Hall(TDM Hall). In Ernakulam there are also roads known as Diwans Road and Thottekkat Road. There is also a compound by the name Thottekkat compound by the side of Durbar Hall Road.
