= History of Thrissur =

History of Thrissur, Kerala, India

Timeline of Thrissur
Year	Event
1200 BCE – 200 CE	Iron Age Megalithic Culture
2nd–1st century BCE	Rise of Muziris as a port
1st–3rd centuries CE	Roman coins of the period found
800–1124	Rule of Perumals of Mahodayapuram
855	Sthanu Ravi inscription at Koodalmanikyam Temple at Irinjalakuda
930	Kota Ravi inscriptions at Avittathur
1000	Jewish Copper plate issued at Mahodayapuram
1024	Rajasimha inscription at Thazhekad
1036	Rajasimha inscription at Thiruvanchikulam Temple
11th century	Inscription at Vadakkumnathan Temple, Thrissur
1225	Syrian Christian copper plate issued by Vira Raghava of Perumpadapu Swaroopam
1523	Portuguese Fort at Cranganore
1599	Syrian Christian priests from Palayoor and Mattom take part in the Synod of Diamper
1606, 1677, 1681	Inscriptions at Palayoor
1710	Dutch control over Chettuva
1750–1762	Zamorin's occupation of Thrissur
1789	Tipu Sultan's occupation of Thrissur
1790–1805	Rule of Rama Varma, Sakthan Thampuran
1791	Treaty between Cochin and the East India Company by which Kingdom of Cochin became a vassal of the company
1794	Fortifications around the Thrissur town by Sakthan Thampuran
1800	Cochin State placed under the Madras Government
1814	Construction of the Mart Mariam Big Church at Thrissur
1816	The first known map of Thrissur prepared by John Gould
1889	St. Thomas College, Thrissur founded
1921	Thrissur made a municipality
1925	Cochin Legislative Council with elected members from Thrissur
1925, 1927	Mohandas Karamchand Gandhi visits Thrissur
1935	Labour Brotherhood in Thrissur
1936	Cochin State Congress founded
1936	Electricity agitation
1940	Cochin Karshakasabha founded
1941	Cochin State Prajamandal
1947	Temple entry allowed in Cochin
1949	Travancore-Cochin State comes into existence
1 July 1949	Thrissur district was formed
1956	Formation of Kerala State

Thrissur is the administrative capital of Thrissur District, in the central part of Kerala state, India. Thrissur district was formed on 1 July 1949. It is an important cultural centre, and is known as the Cultural Capital of Kerala. It is famous for the Thrissur Pooram festival, one of the most colourful and spectacular temple festival of Kerala. From ancient times, Thrissur has been politically, economically and culturally significant to the Indian subcontinent. It has opened the gates for Arabs, Romans, Portuguese, Dutch and English. According to tradition, Thrissur is where Christianity, Islam and Judaism entered the Indian subcontinent. Local Christian tradition holds that Thomas the Apostle arrived in 52 CE, and Muslim tradition states that Methala is the location of country's first mosque.

== Pre-history ==
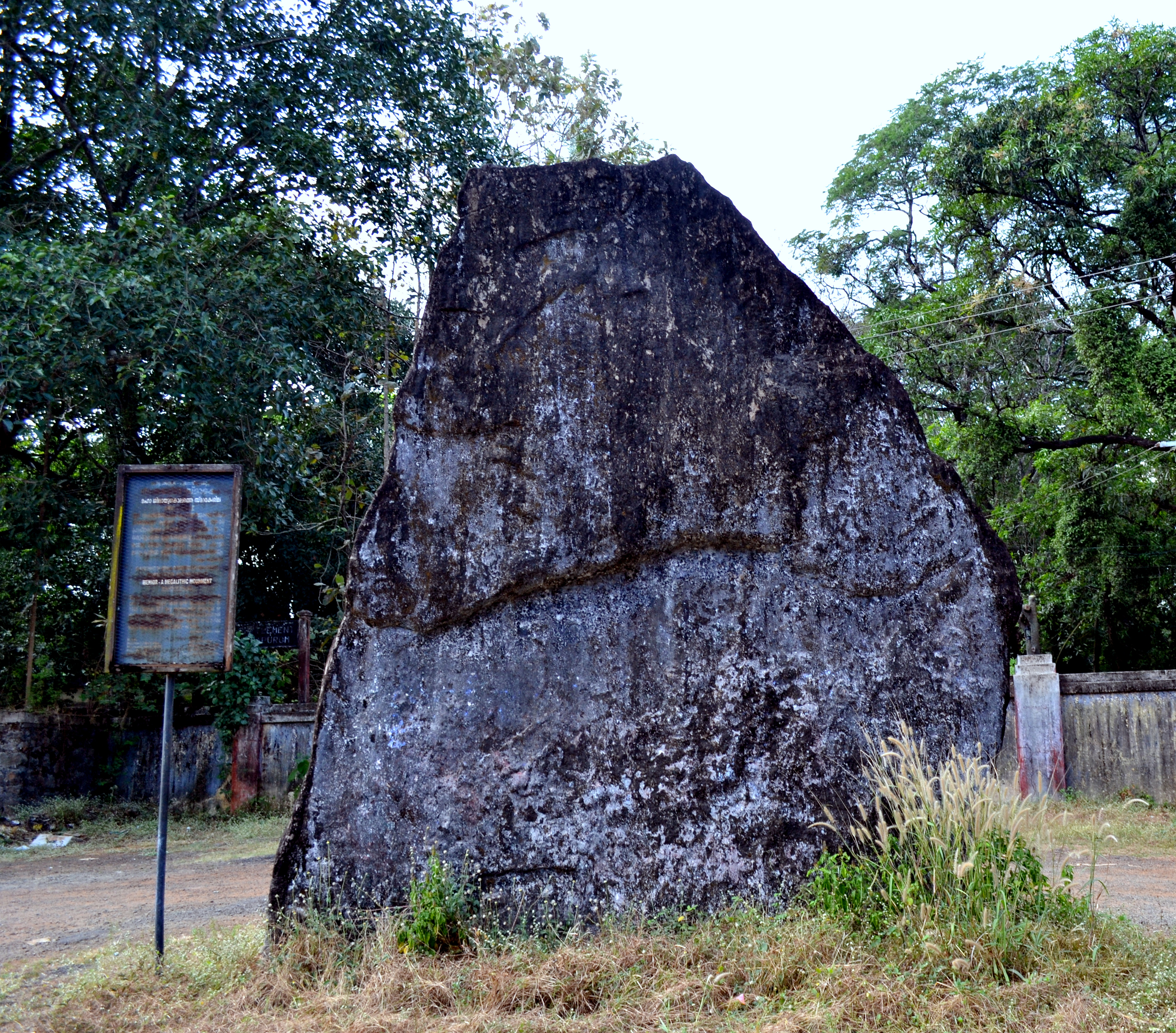
Megalithic Menhir at Ramavarmapuram Kerala

Starting from the Stone Age, Thrissur must have been the site of human settlement. This is evidenced by the presence of a megalithic monuments at Ramavarmapuram, Kuttoor, Cherur and Villadam. The Ramavarmapuram monument is in granite and is of Menhir type. The monument in Ramavarmapuram is 15 feet height and 12 feet 4 inches broad. From 1944, it is under the protection of Department of Archaeology. The monument is locally known as 'Padakkallu' or 'Pulachikkallu'. These menhirs are memorials for the departed souls put up at burial sites. They belong to the Megalithic Age of Kerala, which is roughly estimated between 1000 BCE and 500 CE. All such monuments have not been dated exactly. Some experts are of the view that these are the remnants of the Neolithic Age in the development of human technology. The Ramavarmapuram Menhir is also believed to be a monument belonging to the Sangam period in the South Indian history.

Other monolithic monuments like dolmens and rock-cut caves are at Porkulam, Chiramanengad, Eyyal, Kattakambal and Kakkad. The monument excavated under Archaeologist BK Thapar, between 1949 and 1950, was under the Department of Archaeology. Another megalithic monument is situated at Ariyannur in Thrissur.

== Chera Dynasty ==
=== Muziris ===
Muziris (1st century BCE), is a lost port city in Kodungallur and was a major center of trade in Kerala between the Chera Empire and the Roman Empire. Muziris (Cranganore) was destroyed by massive flooding of the river Periyar in 1341, opening a new port called Kochi. Muziris was also known as Mahodayapuram, Shinkli, Muchiri (anglicised to Muziris) and Muyirikkodu. It is known as 'Vanchi' to locals. Muziris opened the gates for Arabs, Romans, Portuguese, Dutch and English to Indian sub continent and South East Asia. It was famous as a major port for trade and commerce for more than 2,500 years.

There has always been a lot of confusion about the exact location of the port, as also about other aspects of it. For long it was considered to be Kodungalloor. However, in 1983, a large hoard of Roman coins was found at a site around 10 km from a place called Pattanam, some distance away from Kodungalloor. Excavations carried out from 2004 to 2009 at Pattanam has revealed evidence that may point out the exact position of Muziris.

This suggests that Muziris was a port of great international fame and that South India was involved in active trade with several civilizations of West Asia, the Near East and Europe with the port as a means to do so.

While there is a consensus on that both the port and the city ceased to exist around the middle of the 13th century, possibly following an earthquake (or the great flood of 1341 recorded in history, which caused the change of course of Periyar river), there does not seem to be clear evidence as to when the port might have first come into being. Presently, researchers seem to be agreed on that the port was already a bustling center of trade by 500 BCE, and there is some evidence that suggests that Muziris was a city, even if not certainly a port as well, from before 1500 BCE.

It is called 'Murachipatanam' in Sanskrit and Muchiri in Tamil. Later it was also called as Makothai, Mahodayapuram, Mahodayapattanam. The port was familiar to the author of the Periplus of the Erythraean Sea who described it as being situated on Pseudostomos river (Ψευδόστομος: Greek for "false mouth" – a precise translation of the Malayalam description of the mouth of the Periyar, Alimukam) 3 km from its mouth. According to the Periplus, numerous Greek seamen managed an intense trade with Muziris:

"Then come Naura and Tyndis, the first markets of Damirica (Limyrike), and then Muziris and Nelcynda, which are now of leading importance. Tyndis is of the Kingdom of Cerobothra; it is a village in plain sight by the sea. Muziris, of the same Kingdom, abounds in ships sent there with cargoes from Arabia, and by the Greeks; it is located on a river, distant from Tyndis by river and sea five hundred stadia, and up the river from the shore twenty stadia" – The Periplus of the Erythraean Sea, 53–54

=== Arrival of Christianity (51–52) ===
The indigenous church of Kerala has a tradition that St. Thomas sailed there to spread the Christian faith. He landed at the ancient port of Muziris. He then went to Palayoor (near present-day Guruvayoor), which was a Hindu priestly community at that time. He left Palayoor in 52 for the southern part of what is now Kerala State, where he established the Ezharappallikal, or "Seven and Half Churches". These churches are at Kodungallur, Kollam, Niranam, Nilackal (Chayal), Kokkamangalam, Kottakkavu, Palayoor (Chattukulangara) and Thiruvithancode Arappally – the half church.

=== Arrival of Islam (7th century) ===
According to Kerala Muslim tradition, the town of Methala (now a part of modern-day Kodungallur municipality, Thrissur district) was the location of the first mosque in India, the Cheraman Juma Mosque. The legend of Cheraman Perumals states that the last ruler of the Chera dynasty mandated its construction after converting to Islam sometime during the lifetime of the Islamic prophet Muhammad (c. 570–632). According to legend, it was built by Malik Deenar with the help of the native king who was in throne that time, Persian tābiʿūn of Muhammad. Its construction date is said to be sometime between 624 and 629 CE. This construction date would make it the oldest mosque on the Indian subcontinent which is still in use, as well as the second-oldest mosque in the world to offer Jumu'ah prayers. The bodies of some of his Muhammad's original followers are said to be buried here. However, historical research has cast doubt on these claims, suggesting that the origin story may be fictitious or legendary rather than factual.

According to the Arabic manuscript Qissat Shakarwati Farmad, several more mosques were built in the Thrissur area during the era of Malik Dinar, which would make them among the oldest on the Indian subcontinent.

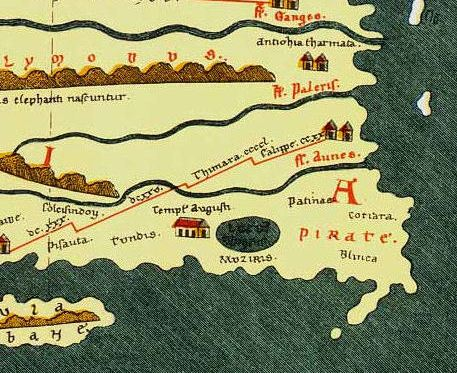
Muziris, as shown in the Tabula Peutingeriana

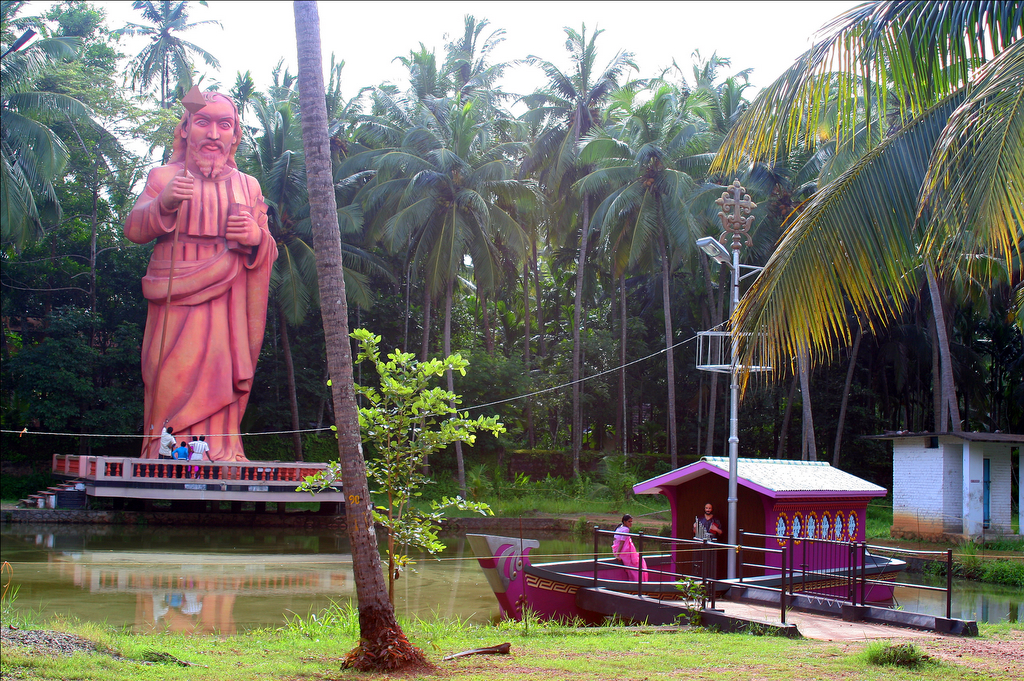
Statue of St. Thomas at Palayoor in Thrissur district

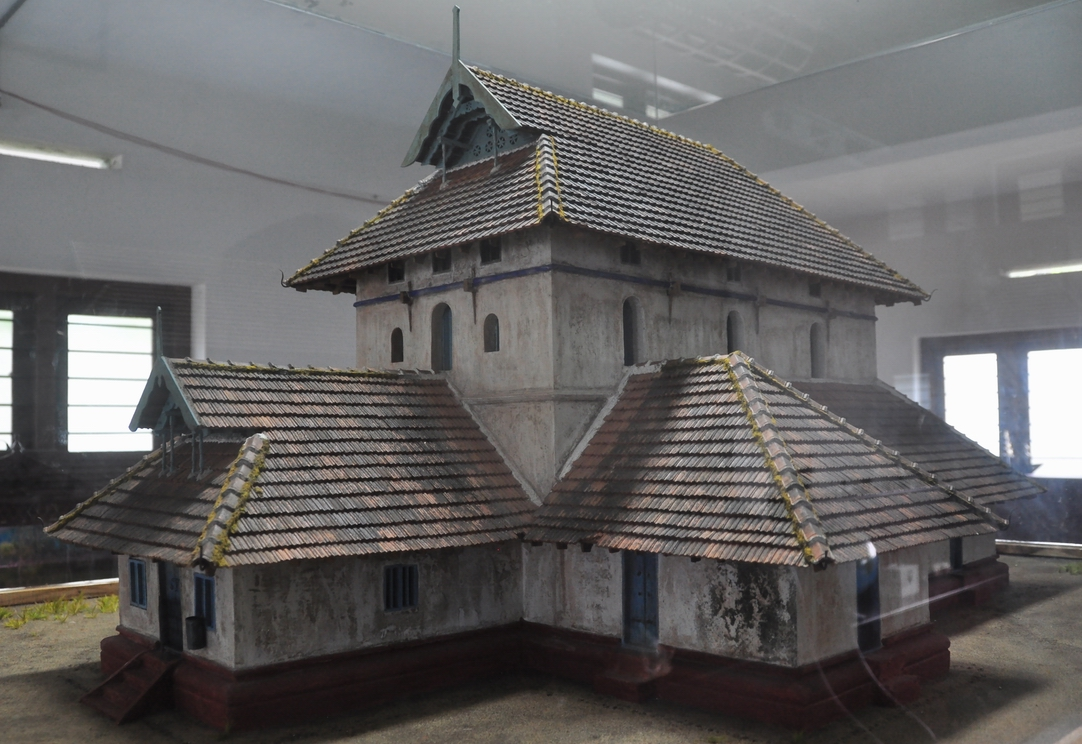
A model of the original Cheraman Juma Mosque

== Arrival of the Portuguese (16th century) ==
=== Raid on Cranganore ===
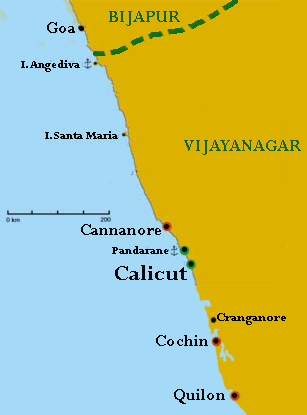
India Malabar Coast c. 1500

Converging on Cranganore, the Portuguese-Cochinese fleet quickly disperses the Zamorin's forces on the beach with cannon fire, and then lands an amphibian assault force – some 1,000 Portuguese and 1,000 Cochinese Nairs, who take on the rest of the Zamorin's forces in close combat. The Zamorin's forces are defeated and driven away from the city.

In the meantime, the Calicut fleet of some five ships and 80 paraus that had been dispatched to save the city are intercepted by the idling Portuguese ships near Palliport and defeated in a naval encounter.

== Sakthan Thampuran (1790–1805) ==
In 1790, Raja Rama Varma, known as Sakthan Thampuran, became the ruler of the Kingdom of Cochin; his ascension is seen as the beginning of the modern period in the history of Kochi and Thrissur. His punishment of criminals and wrongdoers was considered harsh but helped restore peace to the country. Sakthan Thampuran had been at the helm of affairs since 1769 when all administrative authority in the Cochin State was delegated to him by the then reigning sovereign on the initiative of the Travancore Raja and the Dutch Governor. This Raja was a strong ruler and his reign was characterised by firm and vigorous administration. By the end of the 18th century, the power of the feudal chieftains had been crushed and royal authority had become supreme. Sakthan Thampuran was mainly responsible for the destruction of the power of the feudal chieftains and increase of royal power.

Another potent force in the public life of Thrissur and its suburbs was the Namboothiri community and the Syrian Christian community. A large part of the Thrissur taluk was for long under the domination of the Yogiatiripppads, the ecclesiastical heads of the Vadakkunnathan and Perumanam Devaswoms. The Yogiatirippads were elected and consecrated by the Namboothiri Yogams of the respective places. Under their leadership the Namboothiri families of Thrissur and Perumanam were playing in active part against the ruler of Cochin in his wars against the Zamorin of Calicut. Hence after the expulsion of the Zamorin from Thrissur in 1761, drastic action was taken against these families by the Raja of Cochin. The institution of Yogiatirippads was discontinued and the management of Thrissur and Perumanam Devaswoms were taken over by the Government. The Namboothiri Yogams were reduced to impotence. Thus the anti-feudal measures of Sakthan Thampuran coupled with the several administrative reforms introduced by him marked the end of the medieval period in the history of Cochin and ushered in the modern epoch of progress.

It may be interesting in this connection to know something about the institution of the Yogatirippad. The Yogatirippad of the Vadakkunnathan Devaswom was elected by the Namboothiri illams of Thrissur and its suburbs. The Yogatirippad was elected for life in the presence of the ruler of Cochin, local chieftains and prominent Namboothiri from places outside Thrissur. The Yogatirippad was a very powerful and influential dignitary. The last Yogatirippad was banished from Thrissur in 1763 for having joined the side of the Zamorin against Cochin. Sakthan Thampuran put an end to the institution of the Yogatirippad. Since then the numerous Namboothiri illams situated in Thrissur gradually became extinct. But even today there are a few Namboothiri illams in Thrissur and its suburbs reminding one of those old days when the Namboothiri Yogam of Thrissur along with the Perumanam Yogam exercised jurisdiction over a large portion of the present Thrissur taluk.

Sakthan Thampuran enjoyed good relations with the British authorities and was also a personal friend of Dharma Raja of Travancore. Sakthan Thampuran married twice. His first wife was a Nair lady from the reputed Vadakke Kuruppath family of Thrissur (several members of the Cochin Royal Family later took spouses from this family) whom he married when he was 30 years old. He is said to have had a daughter from this first wife. However, this Nethyar Amma (title of the consort of the Cochin Rajah) died soon after an unhappy marriage. Thereafter the Sakthan Thampuran remained single for a few decades, marrying again at the age of 52. The second wife of the Sakthan Thampuran was Chummukutty Nethyar Amma of the Karimpatta family and was a talented musician and dancer of Kaikottikalli. She was 17 at the time of her marriage with the Sakthan Thampuran. The marriage was without issue and within four years, Sakthan Thampuran died. In those days the widowed Nethyar Ammas did not have any special provisions from the state and hence Chummukutty, at the age of 21, returned to her ancestral home. His palace, Shakthan Thampuran Palace, in Thrissur is preserved as a monument and he was responsible for developing the Thrissur city and also making it the Cultural Capital of Kerala.
