= Varma (given name) =

Finnish given name

- Gender: female and male
- Language: Finnish

Origin
- Origin: Finnish
- Meaning: sure, certain

Varma is a Finnish forename, predominantly female but also used for males. Its name day is 23 August.

The Finnish word varma means "certain", "sure", "confident". The name belongs to the class of names with literal meanings in Finnish introduced around the turn of the 19th and 20th centuries. Its first official appearance was in the 1909 St. Petersburg Finnish calendar. It was more popular in the early 20th century but has continued in occasional use. Under the 1946 First Names Act, the Ministry of Justice designated Varma as a female name, but it was also given to a few boys as recently as the 2010s. As of 2019, it had been given to 180 boys and 680 girls.

Notable people with this name include:

- Varma Kallio (1920–2003), Finnish politician
- Varma Lahtinen (1894–1976), Finnish actress
- Varma K. Turunen (1913–1994), Finnish politician

== See also ==
- Varma (icebreaker)
- Varma Mutual Pension Insurance Company
