= Varman =

Varman is the traditional suffix of Pallava dynasty that is generally translated as "shield" or "protector", and was adopted by Khmer royal lineages.

Varman may refer to:

- Varman (surname)
- Varman dynasty of eastern India (Assam)
- Varman dynasty (Bengal) (eastern India)
- Varman dynasty of Kannauj (northern India)
- Varman dynasty (Cambodia)
- Varman, Rajasthan, a village in India

== See also ==
- Varma (disambiguation)
- Verma (disambiguation)
- Barman (disambiguation)
