= C. Thiruvenkatacharya =

Indian civil servant

Diwan of Cochin
- In office 1890–1893
- Monarchs: Kerala Varma V, Rama Varma XV
- Preceded by: T. Govindan Menon
- Succeeded by: V. Subramanya Pillai

Personal details
- Died: 1893

C. Thiruvenkatacharya (died 1893) was an Indian civil servant and administrator in the Madras Presidency. He served as the Diwan of Cochin kingdom from 1890 to 1893.

== Career ==
Thiruvenkatacharya started as a zillah judge in the Madras Presidency. In 1890, he was appointed as Diwan of Cochin kingdom and served till 1893. During this period, he tried his best to promote education. He also brought out reforms in the Postal system.
