= Ernakulam Public Library =

Public library in Kerala, India

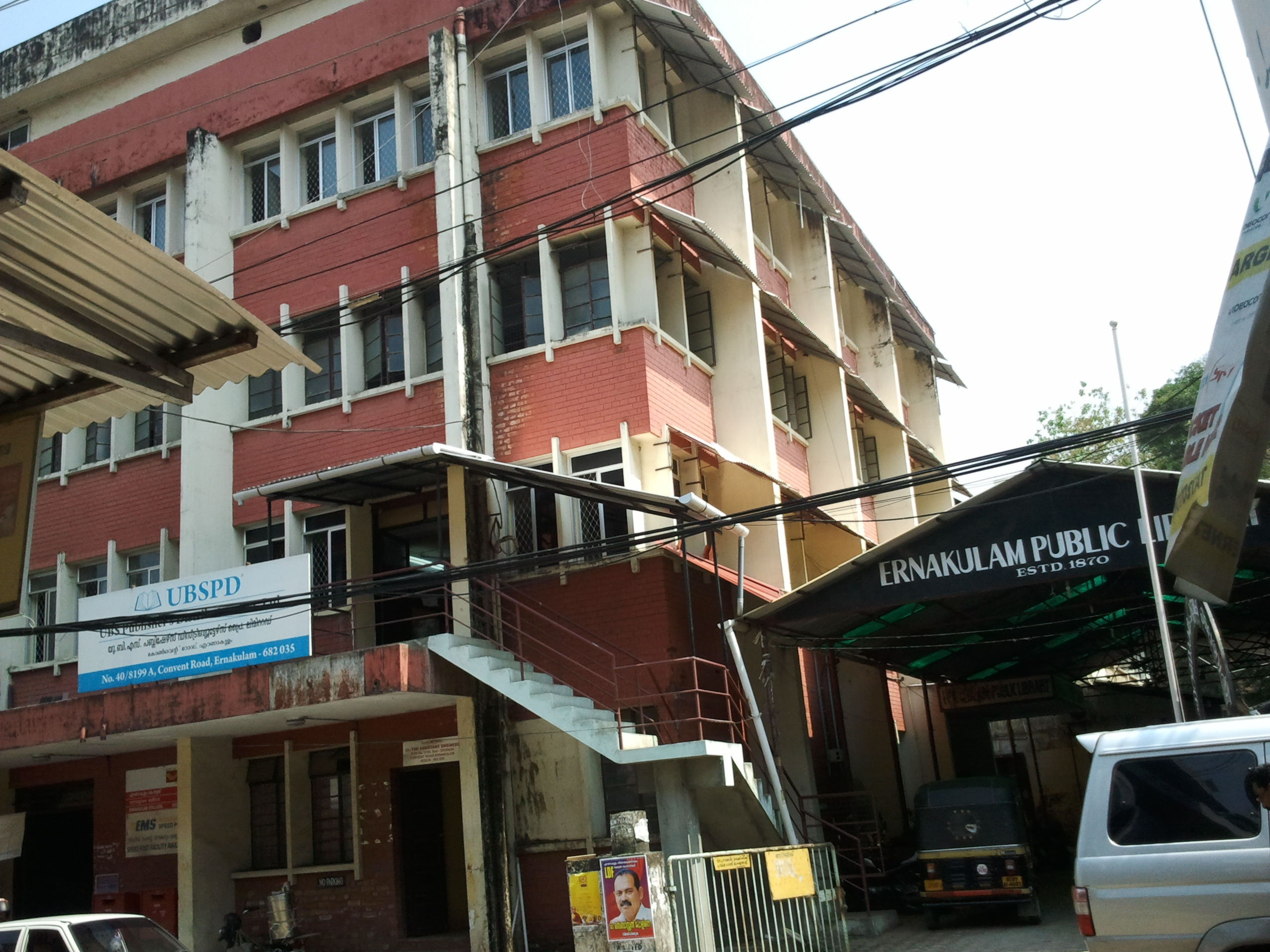
- 9.976721091445834°N 76.28272582061875°E
- Location: Convent Road, Kochi, Kerala, India
- Type: Public library
- Established: 1870

Collection
- Items collected: books, journals, newspapers, magazines, maps, prints
- Size: 150,000 books in Malayalam, Sanskrit, Tamil, Hindi and English

Access and use
- Access requirements: Open to anyone with a genuine need to use the collection

Other information
- Employees: 10
- Website: opac.ernakulampubliclibrary.com

Ernakulam Public Library is a public library in Kochi in the state of Kerala, India. Established in 1870, it is the oldest public library in Kerala. The library serves as the most important information store and cultural centre of Ernakulam and has a collection of several books on various subjects. This library contributed a lot to the social and cultural improvements of the city over the past three centuries.

== History ==
Thottakattu Sankunni Menon, Diwan of the Cochin Kingdom presents his idea of a Public Library in Cochin State to Rama Varma XIV, King of Cochin. Based upon this a meeting was held on 8 October 1869 at the school building premises now occupied by Maharaja’s College, Ernakulam. The first president of the library was the principal of the College, A.F. Sealy. The minutes of the meeting says : that a Public Library and Reading Room be established for the benefit of the community. Thus was born, this institution.

== Developments ==
The foundation stone for new building was laid by Sri.C.Achutha Menon, the then chief Minister of Kerala and was inaugurated on 3 March 1974. The second floor was completed in the year 1977 and was inaugurated by Cardinal Joseph Parecattil. The Third Floor which consists of an auditorium was completed in June 1987.

== Facilities ==
- News Paper Reading Section
- Children’s Reading Section
- General reading room
- Study Area for Aspirants
- Open Auditorium

== Membership ==
The library offers memberships like Institutional Membership, Lifetime Membership, First Class Membership, Second Class Membership and Third Class Membership.

Fees Structure
	Institution (I)	Life Member (L)	First Class (A)	Second Class (B)	Third Class (C)
Admission Fee	100	100	100	100	100
Life Membership Fee/Monthly Subscription	50000	9000	160	80	40
Security Deposit	0	0	2500	1500	700
Total	50100	9100	2760	1680	840

Subscription are always payable quarterly in advance on 1 January, April, July and October every year. In case of admission during the quarter, the subscription for remaining calendar months should be paid in advance.
