= T. Sankunni Menon =

Indian civil servant

Thottekat Sankunni Menon CSI

Diwan of Cochin
- In office 1860–1879
- Monarchs: Ravi Varma IV, Rama Varma XIV
- Preceded by: Venkata Rayar
- Succeeded by: T. Govinda Menon

Thottekat Sankunni Menon CSI (21 April 1820 - 1881), also spelt as Shungoony Menon, was an Indian civil servant and administrator who served as the Diwan of the Cochin kingdom from 1860 to 1879. His administration is recognized as a period of development. Sankunni Menon's brother T. Govinda Menon also served as Diwan from 1879 to 1889.

== Early life ==
Born in Trichur in 1820, Sankunni Menon was the eldest son of Kizhakke Thottekat Ammini Amma and T. Sankara Warrier who had served as the Diwan of Cochin kingdom from 1840 to 1856. Sankunni belongs to the Thottekat family through matrilineal succession.

Sankunni Menon had a good English education and joined the Madras provincial civil service serving as a Deputy Collector in Tinnevely District when he was appointed Diwan of Cochin to succeed Venkata Rao.

== Diwan ==
The first four years of Sankunni Menon's diwanship were occupied with his handling the intrigues of his deputy, Parameswara Bhattar. In 1864, Bhattar's patron Ravi Varma IV died and Sankummi Menon took full control of the administration after dismissing Parameswara Bhattar.

Having served as judicial officer in British India prior to his appointment as diwan, Menon reformed the judicial system of Cochin. He established munsiff courts in all the taluks. Till Menon's time, all judicial appointments in the state were held by unqualified men and there was rampant corruption. Menon put an end to all this and made it mandatory for judicial officers to be qualified barristers. Their powers and duties were codified and pay, doubled. Through a total of eleven regulations, Menon brought the system on par with those prevailing in British India.

The Interportal Trade Convention was held in 1865 in which the princely states of Cochin and Travancore and British India (representing Malabar district) participated. As a result of the convention, Cochin relinquished its monopoly over tobacco and raised salt tax to prices on par with British India. These measures helped curb smuggling of essential commodities.

To compensate for the loss of revenue due to relinquishment of the tobacco monopoly, Menon increased the price of paddy. Coincidentally, during this period, irrigation prospered and large tracts of land especially in the Chittur taluk were brought under cultivation. The government of Cochin also assumed a monopoly over the sale of opium and ganja. The total land revenue increased by over 35 percent during Menon's tenure. Registration of land deeds was introduced, court fee was revised and forest lands were cleared for coffee cultivation. The income of the state increased by over 50 percent during Menon's tenure.

A public works department was organised in 1868 under a European engineer. Sankunni Menon negotiated with railway authorities in British India for the extension of the railways to the state's capital but the efforts did not come to fruitition during the diwan's lifetime. The state postal service was opened for public use. The Ernakulam Public Library was opened on 1 January 1870 and the Trichur Public Library in 1873. The Ernakulam school was raised to the standard of a second-grade college and English schools were opened in all taluk centres.

Sankunni Menon retired on 22 August 1879 due to failing health. He was succeeded by his younger brother Govinda. On his retirement, the monarch Rama Varma wrote to him

We shall lose in you a safe and prudent administrator, and it will be a constant regret that the conduct of affairs will no longer be guided by your wise and sagacious counsels. We fully realize that during your term of office the country has made vast progress in material prosperity; the resources of the land have remarkably developed; commerce and agriculture have been widely extended; and the revenue has attained to an amount that is the highest on record

== Honours ==
For his services to the British Empire, Sankunni Menon was made a Companion of the Order of the Star of India.
