= Ravi Varma =

Ravi Varma or Ravivarma is a Hindu male name used in India. It may refer to:

== People ==
- Ravivarma of Kadamba, 5th century ruler
- Ravivarman Kulaśēkhara, 14th century warrior king of Quilon, Kerala
- Ravi Varma of Padinjare Kovilakam (1745–1793), rebel prince regent of Calicut, Malabar
- Raja Ravi Varma (1848–1906), Indian artist
- Ravi Varma IV (d. 1864), Maharaja of Cochin
- Ravi Varma V (Maharaja Ravi Varma Kunjappan Thampuran) (1865–1946), Maharaja of Cochin
- Ravi Varma (stunt director) (born 1974), Indian stunt director
- Ravi Varma (East Godavari actor) (born 1975), Indian actor of Telugu films from East Godavari
- Ravi Varma (Kakinada actor) (born 1975), Indian actor of Telugu films from Kakinada
- Ravi Verma, regional director for the Asia Regional Office of the International Center for Research on Women

== Other uses ==
- Ravivarma (film), a 1992 Indian Kannada film
- Ravi Verma, a fictional police officer in the 1975 Indian film Deewaar, played by Shashi Kapoor and Raju Shrestha

== See also ==
- Rama Varma (disambiguation)
- Ravi Varman (fl. 1999–2018), Indian cinematographer, filmmaker, producer and writer
- Rama Varma Kochaniyan Thampuran (d. 1964), Indian royal from the Kingdom of Cochin
- Ravivarma Narasimha Domba Heggade, Raja of the principality of Vitla, India
- Ravivarman Sharmila (fl. 1993–2000), Indian national carrom champion
