= Palayur =

Palayur Palur
- town
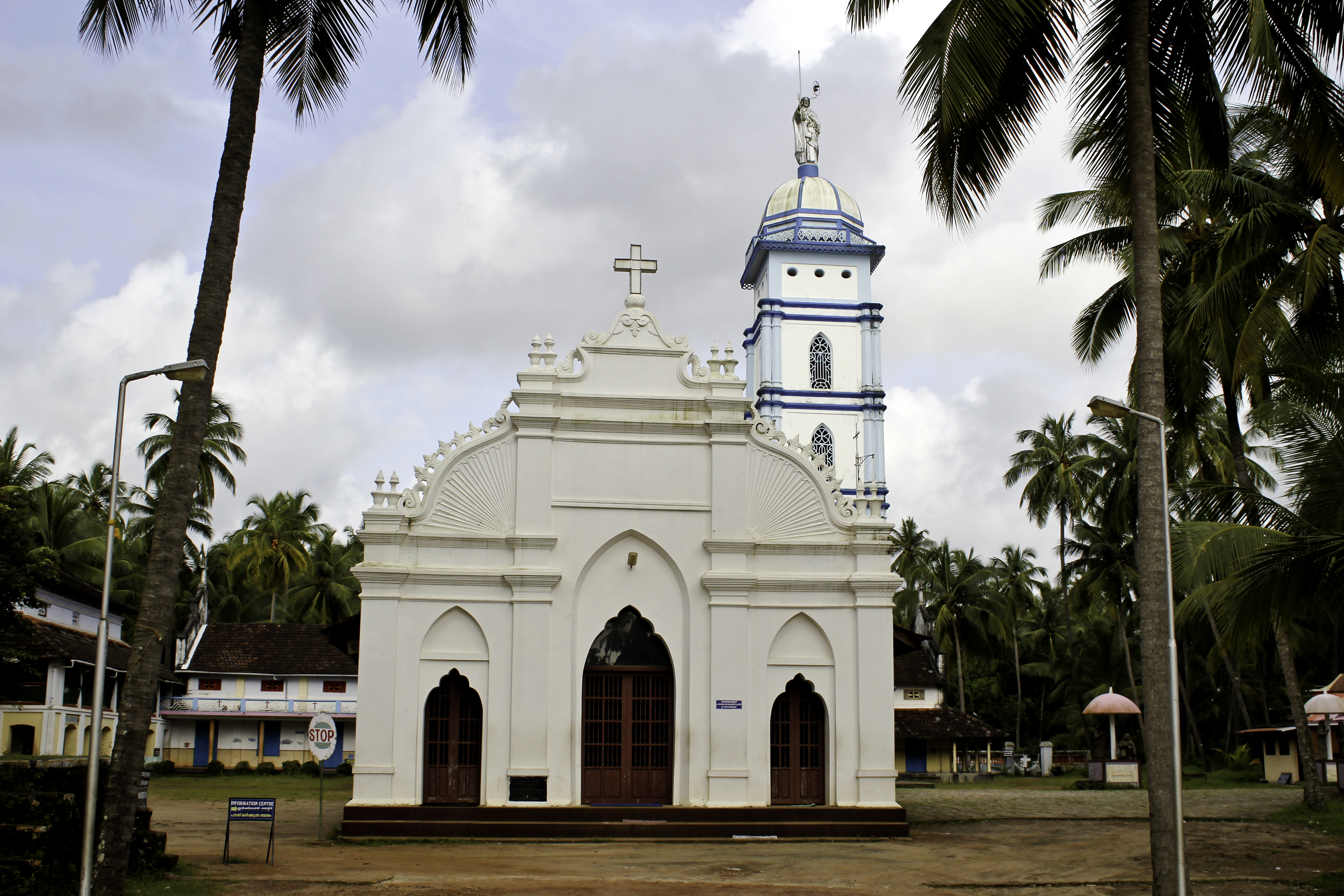
- Palayur Church
- Interactive map of Palayur
- Coordinates: 10.582139°N 76.035534°E
- Country: India
- State: Kerala
- District: Thrissur

Languages
  - Official: Malayalam, English
- Time zone: UTC+5:30 (IST)
- PIN: 680506
- Telephone code: +91487

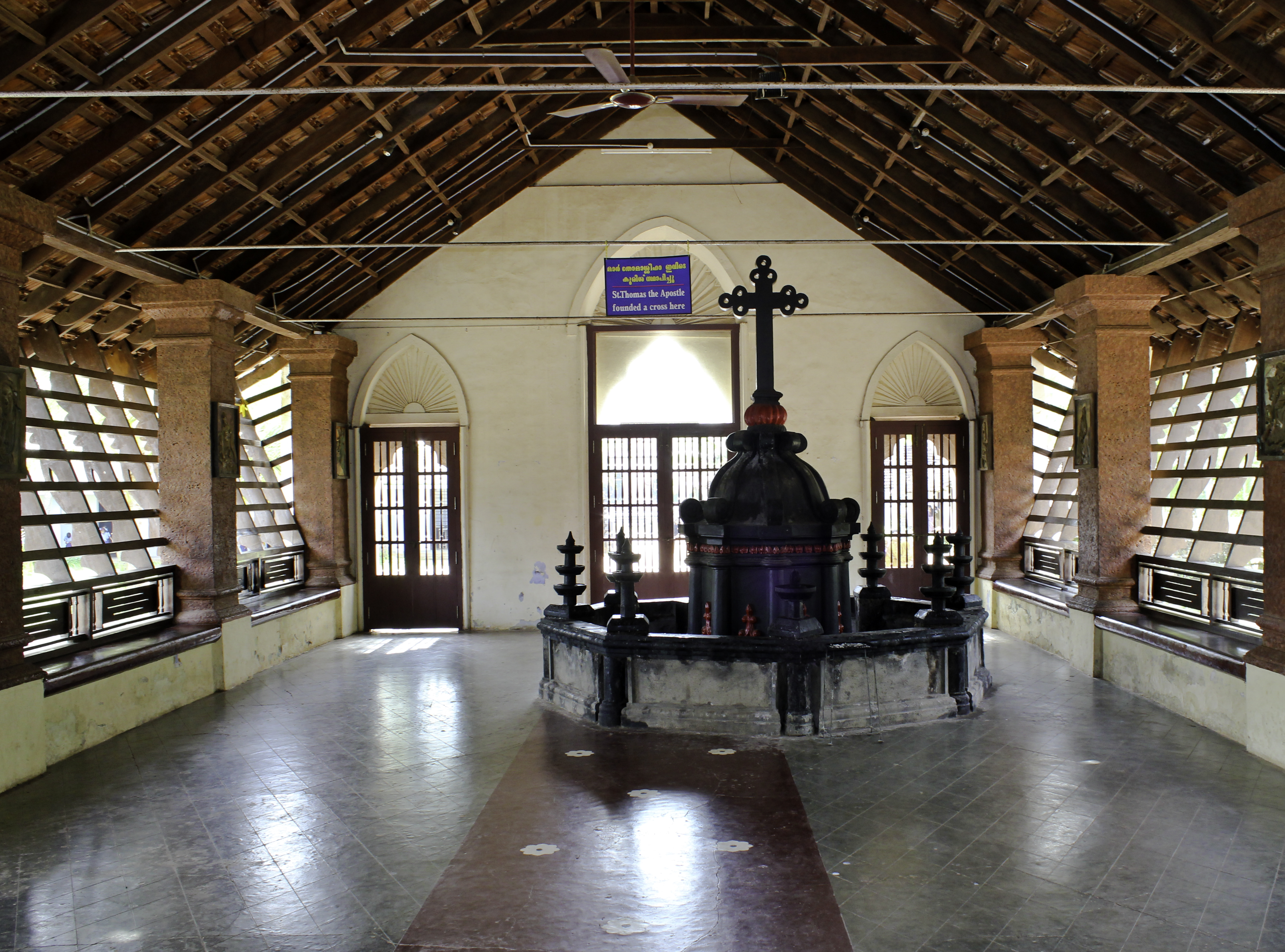
Kerala Syrian architecture

Palayūr, also called Palayoor and historically as Palur, is a town near Chavakkad, Thrissur district, India. It is famous for its ancient church, Palayur Mar Thoma Church, which is believed to be one of the seven major churches founded by Saint Thomas the Apostle in Malabar in 52 AD. It is the assumed to be first Christian Church in India.

== History ==
According to Saint Thomas Christian tradition, Saint Thomas arrived in 50 AD at Muziris (Kodungallūr) with Jewish merchants for the propagation of Christianity. Through the sea route, he reached Palayur in 52 AD and built the church there.

Palayur also had a flourishing Jewish settlement known as the Jūtankunnu ("Jews' Hill"). Palayur was connected from the first century onwards to ancient trade centres in Kerala, especially Muziris, by rivers and backwaters. The river and backwater system in the erstwhile Kingdom of Cochin opens out into the sea at Chetuva , Kodungallur and Kochi, with three of the seven Thomasine churches at Palur, Kodungallur, and North Paravur connected by this system. People from distants lands found their way to Kerala and to Palayur since ancient times. The coast was familiar country to the Phoenicians, the Romans, the Arabs and the Chinese long before Vasco da Gama arrived in 1498.

Palayur was a stronghold of Brahmins. When Thomas arrived from Kodungallur, Jews already had a settlement at Palayur, two thousand years ago. Ruins of the ancient Palayur Synagogue are still visible outside of a Hindu temple about a furlong away from the Church.

== Jews of Palayur ==
Palayur was an important settlement of Jews in Malabar. The remnants of Jewish synagogue is known as the Judankunnu, literally meaning the 'hill of the Jews'. Palayur, popularly known as Palur among the Mappila Jews, is of great importance in many their Malayalam folk songs and other local Jewish traditions.

== Christianity in Palayur and Palayur Church ==
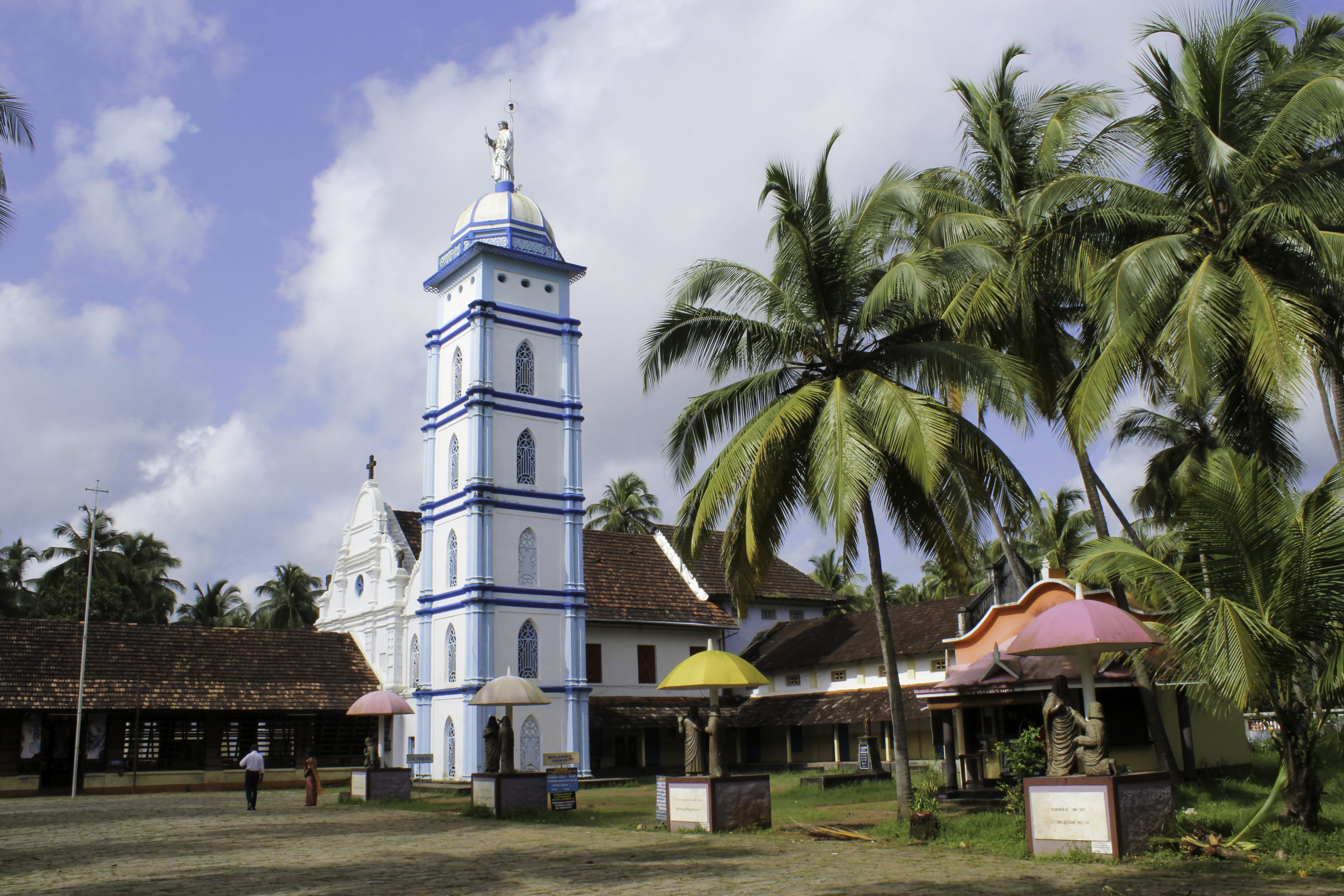
Palayoor Church

Palayur Mar Thoma Major Archiepiscopal Church Palayur. is unique in that the present church has a continuous history of two millennia and stands on the same spot where the apostle first established it. The first church founded by St. Thomas continued to exist for many centuries and we know that in 1607 the Italian Jesuit Giacomo Fenicio with permission from the ecclesiastical authorities, to construct a more convenient church around the existing old structure for the parish of Palayur.

The church was under Mar Elias Mellus and Mar Mikhail Agustinos during their tenure.

The Thrissur Archdiocesan authorities are today wholeheartedly committed to the cause of developing Palayur into the focus of national and international pilgrim tourism in South India. The Palayur church was elevated as the first Archdiocesan pilgrim centre on 16 April 2000. The relic of St. Thomas conveyed from Ortona, Italy was established in the main altar of the church. The 30 km long annual Lenten Mahatheerthadanam or great pilgrimage on foot from the Thrissur to Palayur has conducted in every year.

== Industry ==
=== Coir ===
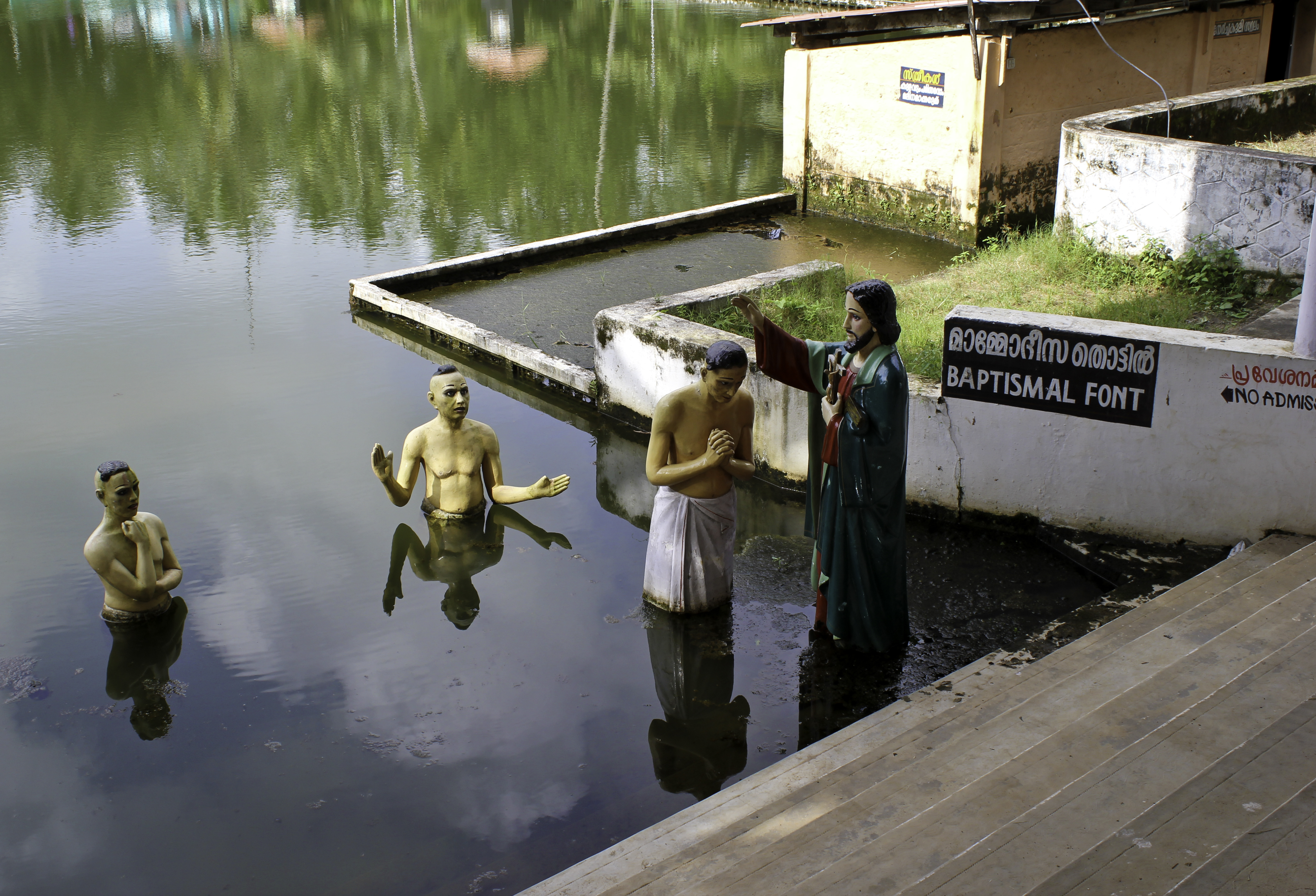
Thaliyakulam

==== Palayoor coir company ====
Chavakkad was once the center of the coir industry. After cultivation, coir production was the most important source of livelihood for the people of the coastal areas.

In 1957, Fr., who was co-vicar of Palayur Church. A coir industry unit was set up at Palayur under the leadership of Mathews Thaiparambil. the unit was located at the site of the Palayur SABS Convent. The ropes required for the Palayur church (manikayar, coconut tying rope) were mainly used by the Maayu export company to provide employment to the locals. Home-based and small units operated here. Workers from other areas came here in search of work.

Years later the church's coir company ceased to exist. After that a coir society was started in Palayur North under the leadership of Poonthath Muhammaduni. Today the industry is at a complete standstill. Coir was made from Palayur and nearby areas and shipped from Chavakkad ferry to Kochi and Kozhikode.

The reality is that the coir industry was the most important non-agricultural sector in Kerala during the formation of the state of Kerala.

== How to reach ==
Palayoor is a part of Trichur District and is located on the west Coast of Kerala. By road it takes 28 km to reach Palayur from Trichur. It is on Trichur – Chavakkad route, via Pavaratty. To travel by train catch Trichur – Guruvayur train (24 km). From Guruvayur to Palayoor take a bus or a taxi/auto rickshaw (2 km). Nedumbasserry International Airport is only 80 km from Palayoor.

=== Road ===
Buses ply regularly between Palayoor/Chavakkad/Guruvayoor/Thrissur and all major towns in Kerala and South India.

- From the North: Kuttippuram-Kunnamkulam-Chavakkad-Palayoor
- From the South: Kodungallur-Chettuva-Chavakkad-Palayoor
- From the East: Thrissur-Kanjany-Enammavu-Pavaratty-Palayoor
- N.B. Chavakkad Palayur distance: 0.75 km
- Guruvayur Palayur distance: 2.00 km

=== Train ===
Direct trains connect Thrissur with all major Indian cities like Delhi, Bombay, Calcutta, Chennai, Bengaluru, Coimbatore, Trivandrum..... Some trains proceed from Thrissur up to Guruvayur.

- N.B. Thrissur railway station is 25 km from Palayur
- Guruvayur railway station is 3 km from Palayur

=== Air ===
- Palayur is equidistant (less than 90 km) from the following airports:
- Kochi International Airport, Nedumbassery
- Calicut International Airport, Karippur
- Coimbatore Airport is 140 km from Palayoor

=== Waterways ===
- Waterways transport is not as active as it was in the early days
- Initiatives are taken by the government in this mode of transport
- Once it is active, one could make use of Canoli Canal its sub-canals to reach Palayoor Church.

== See also ==
- Timeline of Thrissur
- Saint Thomas Christians

== Monuments at Palayoor ==
- Boat Jetty (Bottukulam) where St Thomas landed at Palayoor.
- Thaliyakulam -The pond where St Thomas baptized the local people.
- The replica of Chinna Malai (of Mylapore – Madras) where St Thomas attained martyrdom in 72 AD.
- The historical remnants of old Aryan Temple.
- Historical Museum.
- Ancient Lanterns around the church
- Jewish Hill & Jewish Synagogue.
