= Rama Varma VIII =

Former ruler of the Kingdom of Cochin

Rama Varma VIII (died 16 August 1790) was an Indian monarch who ruled the Kingdom of Cochin from 1775 until his death in 1790.

== Reign ==
Rama Varma VIII, the younger brother of Kerala Varma II, succeeded him to the throne upon his death in 1775. However, Rama Varma VIII had little authority during his reign, as the kingdom was largely a puppet state under the suzerainty of Hyder Ali of Mysore. During his reign, the Muslim general Sardar Khan captured the city of Cochin and made Thrissur his residence.

Rama Varma VIII succumbed to an epidemic of small pox on 16 August 1790 and was succeeded to the throne by his nephew Rama Varma IX.

Regnal titles
Preceded by Kerala Varma II	Maharaja of Cochin; 1775–1790	Succeeded by Rama Varma IX
