= A. F. Sealy =

British clergyman, educationist and naturalist

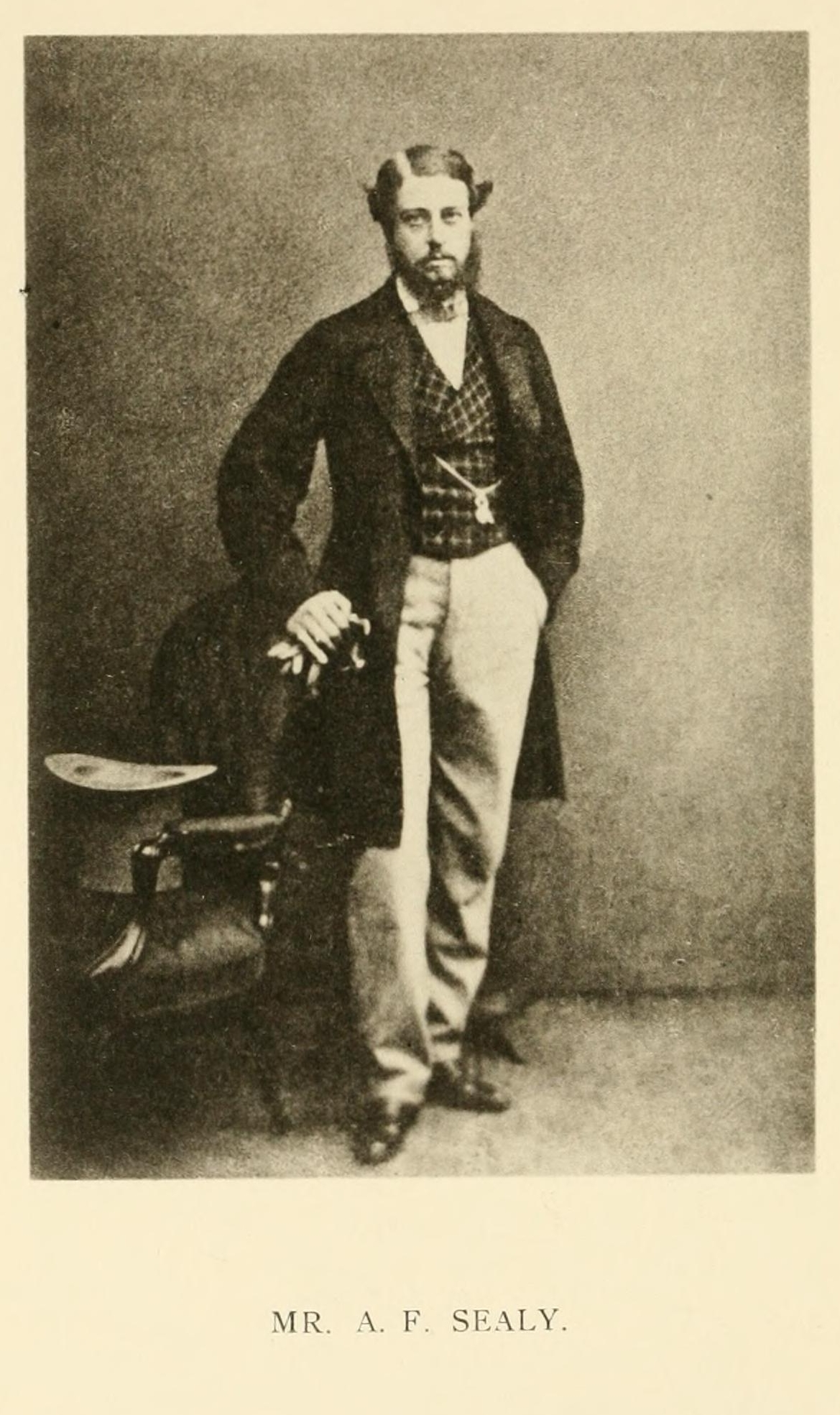

Alfred Forbes Sealy (25 October 1831 – 29 October 1894) was a British clergyman, educationist and naturalist. He worked as the first principal of the Rajah's High School (now Maharaja's College) in Cochin in India where he died. He was a founding member of the British Ornithologists' Union.

== Life and work ==
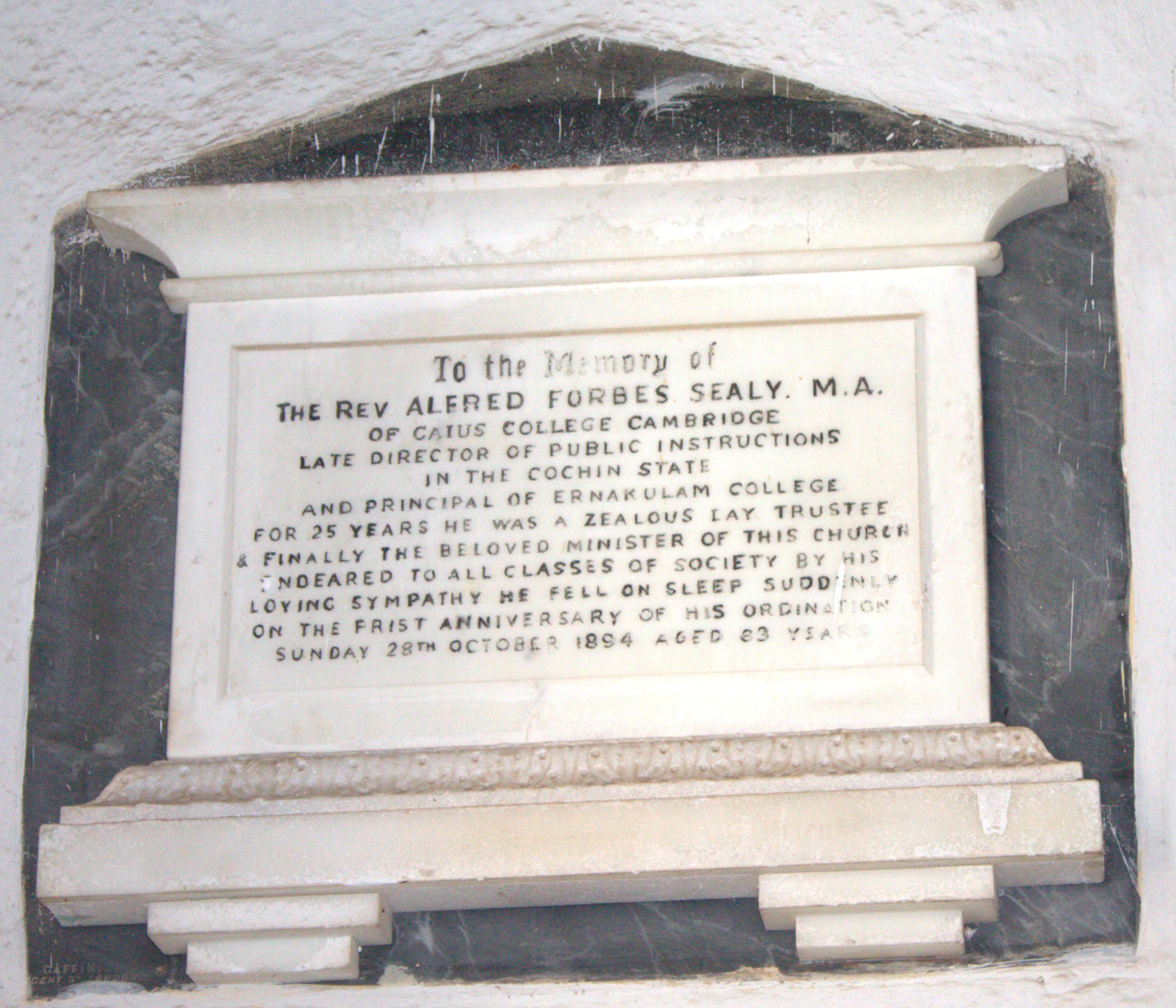
Memorial tablet at St. Francis Church, Kochi

Sealy was born in Clevedale near Bristol to Major General Benjamin Dowden Sealy of the Honorable East India Company and his wife Mary Annie Byers. He went to study under Rev. G. Despard, of Redland, Clifton and Rev. C. Pritchard at Clapham before joining as a pensioner at Gonville and Caius College, Cambridge in 1850. He received a BA in 1854 and an MA in 1857 with a Junior Optime in the Mathematical Tripos and a second class in the Natural Science Tripos. He made collections of insects and birds eggs which were presented to the Cambridge University museum. He was a founding member of the British Ornithologists' Union. He moved to India to become the founding principal at the Rajah's High School, Ernakulam while also being a deacon at Madras from 1893. He established a zoology museum at the Maharaja's College in 1874. He also helped found the Ernakulam Public Library in 1870. He served as a Chaplain at St Francis Church, Cochin and later became a Director of Public Instruction for South India during which time he passed rules to stop corporal punishment of students by teachers, only allowing headmasters from ordering it under special circumstances. He was elected Fellow of the Madras University. He died at Cochin from apoplexy.
