= Verma (disambiguation) =

Verma is a variant spelling of the surname Varma (name).

Verma may also refer to:

== People ==
- Verma Malik, Bollywood lyricist
- Verma Panton, Jamaican architect
- H. L. Verma, business science academic and administrator
- Mr. and Mrs. Verma, the fictional hosts of the cooking show Mr. Aur Mrs. Verma Ki Rasoi

== Places ==
- Verma, Møre og Romsdal, a village in Rauma municipality in Møre og Romsdal county, Norway

== See also ==
- Varma (disambiguation)
- Varman (disambiguation)
- Verma module, a type of mathematical object in the representation theory of Lie algebras
