= V. Subramanya Pillai =

Diwan of Cochin Kingdom

Diwan of Cochin
- In office 1893–1897
- Monarch: Rama Varma XV
- Preceded by: C. Thiruvenkatacharya
- Succeeded by: P. Rajagopalachari

V. Subramanya Pillai was an Indian lawyer and administrator who served as the Diwan of the Cochin Kingdom from 1893 to 1897.

== As Diwan ==
Subramanya Pillai is credited with introducing the Indian Stamp Law in the Cochin Kingdom. He also reformed the Jail and Salt departments, opened sanitary boards and reorganized the Medical Department.
