= Venkata Rayar =

Indian civil servant

Diwan of Cochin
- In office 1856–1860
- Monarch: Ravi Varma IV
- Preceded by: T. Sankara Warrier
- Succeeded by: T. Sankunni Menon

Venkata Rayar aka Venkat Rao was an Indian administrator who served as the Diwan of Cochin kingdom from 1856 to 1860 under the regime of Maharaja Ravi Varma IV. He became Diwan in 1856 on the sudden death of the then Diwan, T. Sankara Warrier. He was known to be an able and strict administrator who brought in sweeping changes being well respected, despite opposition and political interferences.

In addition to being an administrator, the Diwan was also spiritual and an accomplished scholar. He had a premonition that a Hanuman idol was buried near the Pushkarini (holy tank) of the main Shiva temple in Ernakulam. Based on his dream vision, this small but very powerful idol of Hanuman was excavated and he requested for land which was promptly provided by the Maharaja. This is now a popular temple called Sree Hanuman Kovil located in central Ernakulam (Kochi) next to the Ernakulam Shiva temple and District Court. The temple was consecrated by Shri Vishvapriya Teertharu of Sode Matha, renowned as Vrundavana Acharya. The history is recorded in Shri Vishvapriya Vilaasa Prabandha by his disciple Kochi Rangappa Acharya. Here is a brief summary:

After completing his 4th Paryaaya in Udupi, Vrundavanacharya was invited by Raja Ravi Varma to his court in Kochi with great pomp and grandeur. The devoted king asked the saint to stay back for a whole year during which time he expounded Madhvacharya's Dvaita philosophy to many disciples. On the king’s birthday, many scholars were invited to debate on Vedaanta. With a gentle smile, Vrundavana Acharya won them all over, clearing their doubts using Acharya Madhva’s interpretation of the Brahma Sutras – which he taught the Diwan without referring to the commentary itself. Rangappa Acharya also records the consecration of the Sree Hanuman Kovil as well as the installation of Pancha Vrundavana of Shri Vadiraaja Tirtha. Here is the corresponding extract (Panchama Vilaasa):

राज-आमात्यम् विष्णु-भक्तम् द्विज-आग्र्यम् ज्ञात्वा तेन प्रार्थितः भाष्यम् अस्मै ।

टीकाम् विना तम् च टीका-अर्थ-युक्तम् व्याचक्षाणम् वीक्ष्य लोकाः ननन्दुः ॥ ५.१५ ॥

Knowing (ज्ञात्वा) the royal minister (राज-आमात्यम्) [Diwan Venkat Rao] to be a devotee of Vishnu (विष्णु-भक्तम्) and foremost among Brahmana-s (द्विज-आग्र्यम्), being requested (प्रार्थितः) by him (तेन), he (Vrundavanacharya) expounded (व्याचक्षाणम्) the Brahmasutra Bhaashyam (भाष्यम्) to him (अस्मै) – even without (विना) referring to the commentary (टीकाम्) itself, he conveyed its full purport of (टीका अर्थ युक्तम्). Seeing (वीक्ष्य) this, the people (लोकाः) rejoiced (ननन्दुः).

तेन अर्थितः श्री-हनुमत्-प्रतीकम् सु-संपुटम् भावि-समीरणस्य ।

संस्थापयामास तदीय-भक्ति-बद्धः हनूमान् किल सन्निधत्ते ॥ ५.१६ ॥

Requested (अर्थितः) by him (तेन) [Diwan Venkat Rao], the icon (प्रतीकम्) of Shri Hanuman (श्री-हनुमत्) was established (संस्थापयामास), as well as the divine Brindaavana (सु-संपुटम्) [Pancha Vrundaavana] of Shri Vadiraaja, the future Vaayu (भावि-समीर-णस्य). Bound (बद्धः) by devotion (भक्ति) to him (तदीय), Hanuman (हनूमान्) indeed (किल) abides there with his divine presence (सन्निधत्ते).

The temple also has a Raghavendra Swamy Brindavana. Festivals such as Ramanavami, Hanumad Jayanthi and Rayara Aradhane are conducted on a grand scale.
