= Pazhassi Raja (disambiguation) =

Pazhassi Raja or Kerala Varma Pazhassi Raja was a ruler of the Kingdom of Kottayam in present-day Kerala, India.

Pazhassi Raja may also refer to:

Places

- Pazhassi Raja Archaeological Museum, East Hill, Kozhikode, Kerala, India
- Pazhassi Dam, Kannur, Kerala, India; on the Bavali River
- Pazhassiraja College, Pulpally, Kerala, India

Films

- Pazhassi Raja (1964 film), Indian biographical film about the ruler
- Kerala Varma Pazhassi Raja (2009 film), Indian biographical film about the ruler by Hariharan

== See also ==
- Kerala Varma (disambiguation)
