= Rama Varma X =

Maharaja of Cochin
- Reign: 26 September 1805 – January 1809
- Predecessor: Sakthan Thampuran
- Successor: Kerala Varma III
- Died: January 1809; Vellarapally Palace, Puthiyedam, Kaladi, now India
- Dynasty: Cochin royal family
- Religion: Hinduism

Rama Varma X (died January 1809) was an Indian monarch who ruled the Kingdom of Cochin from 1805 to 1809.

== Family ==
Rama Varma was the son of Sakthan Thampuran's mother's younger sister (famously known as Chittamma Thampuran) and therefore his cousin. He succeeded the Sakthan Thampuran on the latter's death in 1805.

== Reign ==
Rama Varma is generally remembered as a generous, mild-mannered person and an incapable monarch.

Rama Varma was an excellent writer and authored the Sundarakanda Purana.

== Death ==
Rama Varma died at Vellarapilly in January 1809.

Regnal titles
| Preceded by Rama Varma IX | Maharaja of Cochin; 1805–1809 | Succeeded by Kerala Varma III |
