= Kerala Varma III =

Maharaja of Cochin
- Reign: January 1809 — August 1828
- Coronation: 6 May 1809
- Predecessor: Rama Varma X
- Successor: Rama Varma XI
- Died: August 1828; Vellarapally Palace, Puthiyedam, Kaladi, now India
- Dynasty: Cochin royal family
- Religion: Hinduism

Karkidaka Masathil Theepeta Thampuran (died August 1828) (regnal name: Kerala Varma III), popularly known as Virulam Thampuran, was an Indian monarch who ruled the Kingdom of Cochin from 1809 to 1828. British protectorate was confirmed on 6 May 1809 when Virulam Thampuram was the ruler.

== Reign ==
Kerala Varma III ascended the throne on the death of his brother Rama Varma X in January 1809. Four months after his accession, British protectorate over Cochin was confirmed and the kingdom was inducted as a princely state of British India.

The early part of his reign witnessed the rebellion of the Paliath Achan or Govindan Menon against British interference. Govindan Menon was eventually captured and exiled to Madras and later, Bombay. He died in captivity in 1832. Govindan Menon was replaced as Diwan with Kunhikrishnan Menon (1809–12), who was succeeded by John Munro (1812–15) and Seshagiri Raya (1815–30). Mattancherry, Thrippunithura and Alleppey were garrisoned with British troops to prevent further insurrections and remained till October 1809. The town of Fort Cochin was ceded to the British by the convention of 1814. A zilla court functioned in Cochin from 1812 to 1817.

Kerala Varma had a deep interest in philosophy. He died in August 1828 and was succeeded to the throne by his nephew who assumed the title Rama Varma XI.

Regnal titles
Preceded by Rama Varma X	Maharaja of Cochin; 1809–1828	Succeeded by Rama Varma XI
