= Shakthan Thampuran Palace =

Coordinates: 10.531181°N 76.216259°E

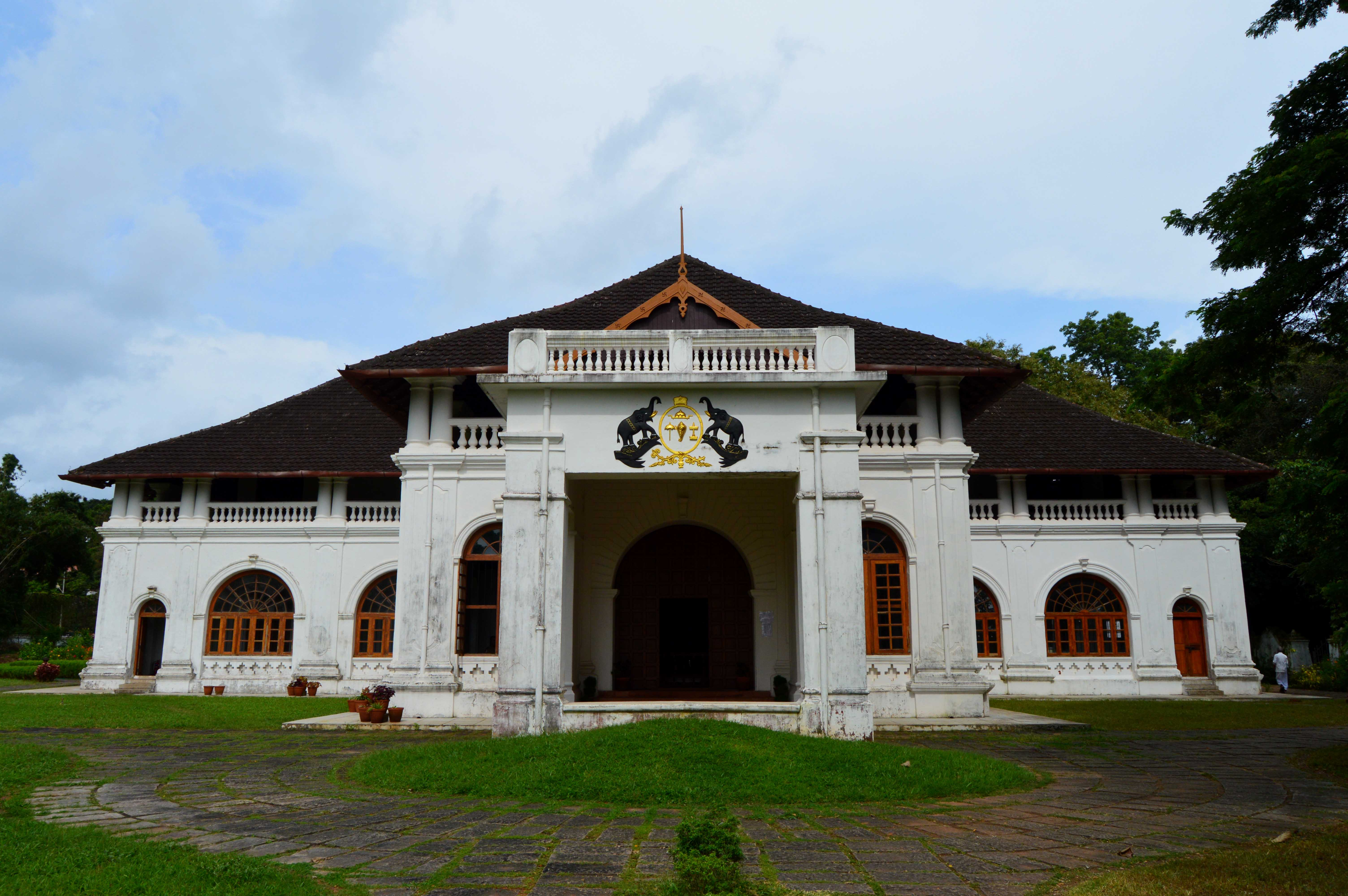
- Façade of the palace
- Interactive map of the Shakthan Thampuran Palace area

General information
- Architectural style: Kerala-Dutch style
- Location: Thrissur, India
- Completed: 1795
- Client: Sakthan Thampuran, Maharaja of Cochin

Technical details
- Structural system: Kerala style of Nālukettu

Shakthan Thampuran Palace is situated in City of Thrissur in Kerala state, India. It is named as Vadakkechira Palace, was reconstructed in Kerala-Dutch style in 1795 by Ramavarma Thampuran of the erstwhile Princely State of Cochin, well as Sakthan Thampuran (Greatest ruler of the Cochin dynasty) is preserved by Archaeological Department. The palace was converted into a museum in 2005 by State.

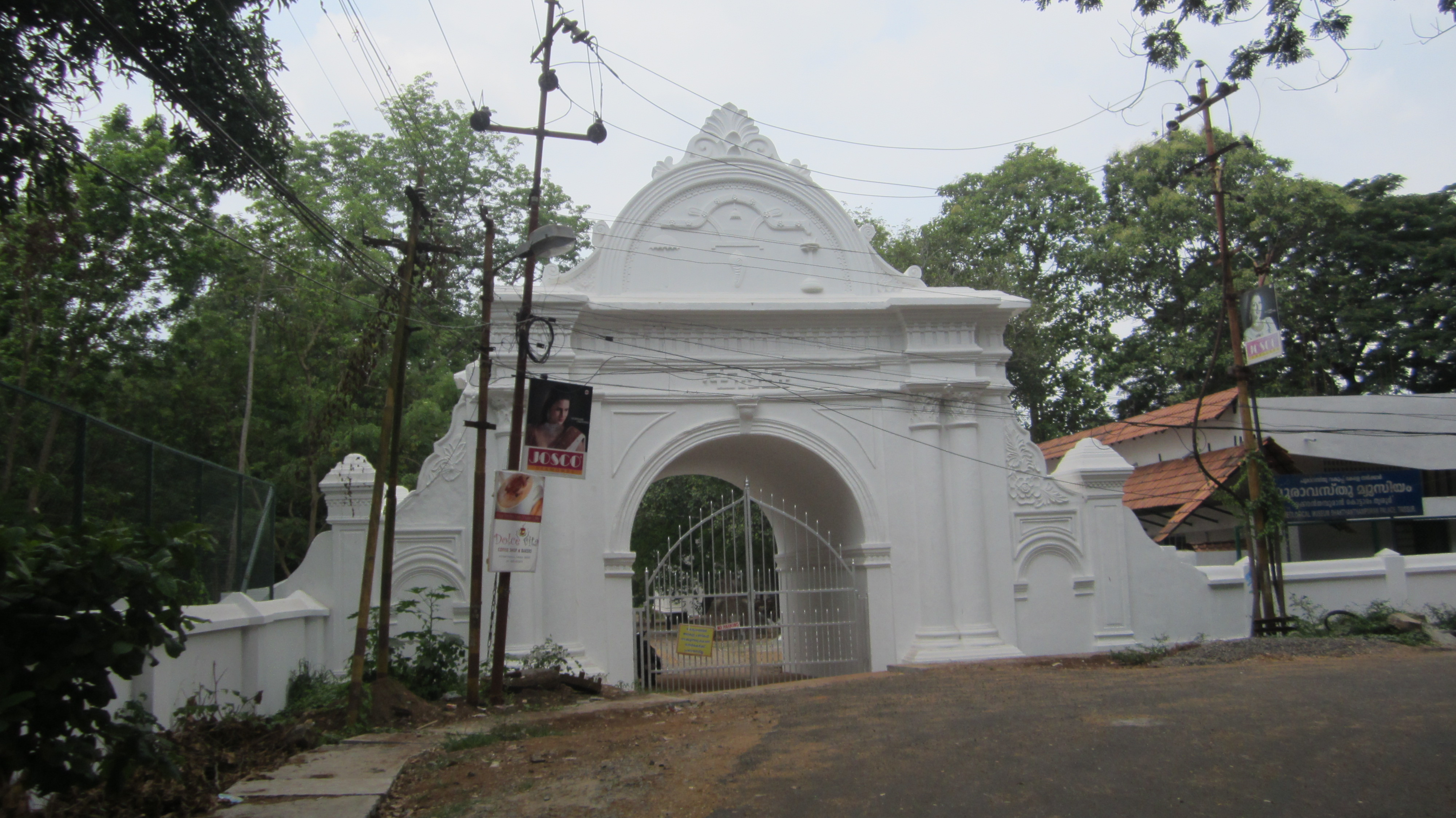
Eastern Gate

== Style ==
The main structure of the Sakthan Thampuran Palace has a two-storeyed building and a traditional Kerala style Nālukettu. High roofs, extra thick walls, spacious rooms and floors paved with finely smoothened Italian marbles are some of the structural specialities of this palace. The interiors of the palace, because of its unique construction offer comfortable and pleasant staying conditions irrespective of the prevailing weather conditions.

== History ==
Sakthan Thampuran Palace once belonged to the Perumpadappu Swaroopam, the ruling dynasty of Kochi. This was the centre of power of King Rama Varma Sakthan Thampuran, who ruled Kochi between AD 1790 and 1805. His rule was regarded as the Golden Era of the Cochin dynasty. The palace is close to the Vadakkumnathan Temple in Thrissur. Saktan Thampuran is credited with the introduction of the Thrissur Pooram festival, an annual festival in May with teams representing the Parmekavu Bhagavathy temple and Tiruvambadi Krishna temple competing for primacy in front of the Vadakkumnathan temple with elephants, percussion, drums, fireworks, etc. The palace was once known as Vadakkechira Kovilakam and it was the king who renovated it into the present form. The palace keeps with it the historical remnants of some important events like the visit of Tipu Sultan with his army. The last member of the royal family to reside here was Rama Varma Bharathan Thampuran, a grand nephew of Chowwarayil Theepetta Veliyathampuran. The palace has a very old Sarpakavu (sacred serpent grove) in its premises.

== Museum ==
The museum displays Bronze Gallery where one can find bronze statues belonging to the period between the 12th and the 18th centuries, Sculpture gallery displaying granite statues from the 9th century to the 17th century, Numismatics Gallery, which systematically displays ancient coins, which were in circulation in the former province of Kochi and neighbouring kingdoms and the history gallery depicting some of the milestones of the Kochi dynasty and the Epigraphy Gallery showcasing the genesis and evolution of ancient writings. Other galleries of interest at the palace include, a Gallery for Household Utensils made of bronze and copper, used by the rulers of Kochi; and a Megalithic Gallery exhibiting remains of the great stone age.

The numismatic section have coins used in Kerala from the 5th century B.C. Roman gold coins (from the Eeyyal hoard) and Travancore native coins (in silver), Veerarayans (gold coins) otta puthan and iratta puthan issued by the kings of Cochin are displayed. These indicate an urban development and commerce. The coin board that measured coins in hundreds to thousands is unique. The coins issued by Tipu Sultan during his brief spell in Kerala, Indo-Dutch coins, Malabar coins (issued by the French), and coins of British India point to different periods of the history of Kerala.

== Serpent Grove ==
Serpent Grove or Sarpa Kavu is a snake shrine built for worship of serpent gods like Naga Raja (King of the snakes) and other snake deities, which is believed to bring prosperity to the royal family. Apart from the occasional prayers and ritualistic feeding of milk to the snakes to please the serpent gods, human interventions in these places are nil.

The snake deities worshiped in serpent grove in the place is Naga raja and Nagayakshi. They are located in the palace garden and can be found under a Saptarna tree.

Located on the southern side of the Shakthan Palace is the Heritage Garden, set up recently to exhibit and preserve some of the indigenous varieties of plants and trees of Kerala. The archaeological garden, situated in the northeastern part of the palace, has collections from the Stone Age recovered from the outskirts of Thrissur.

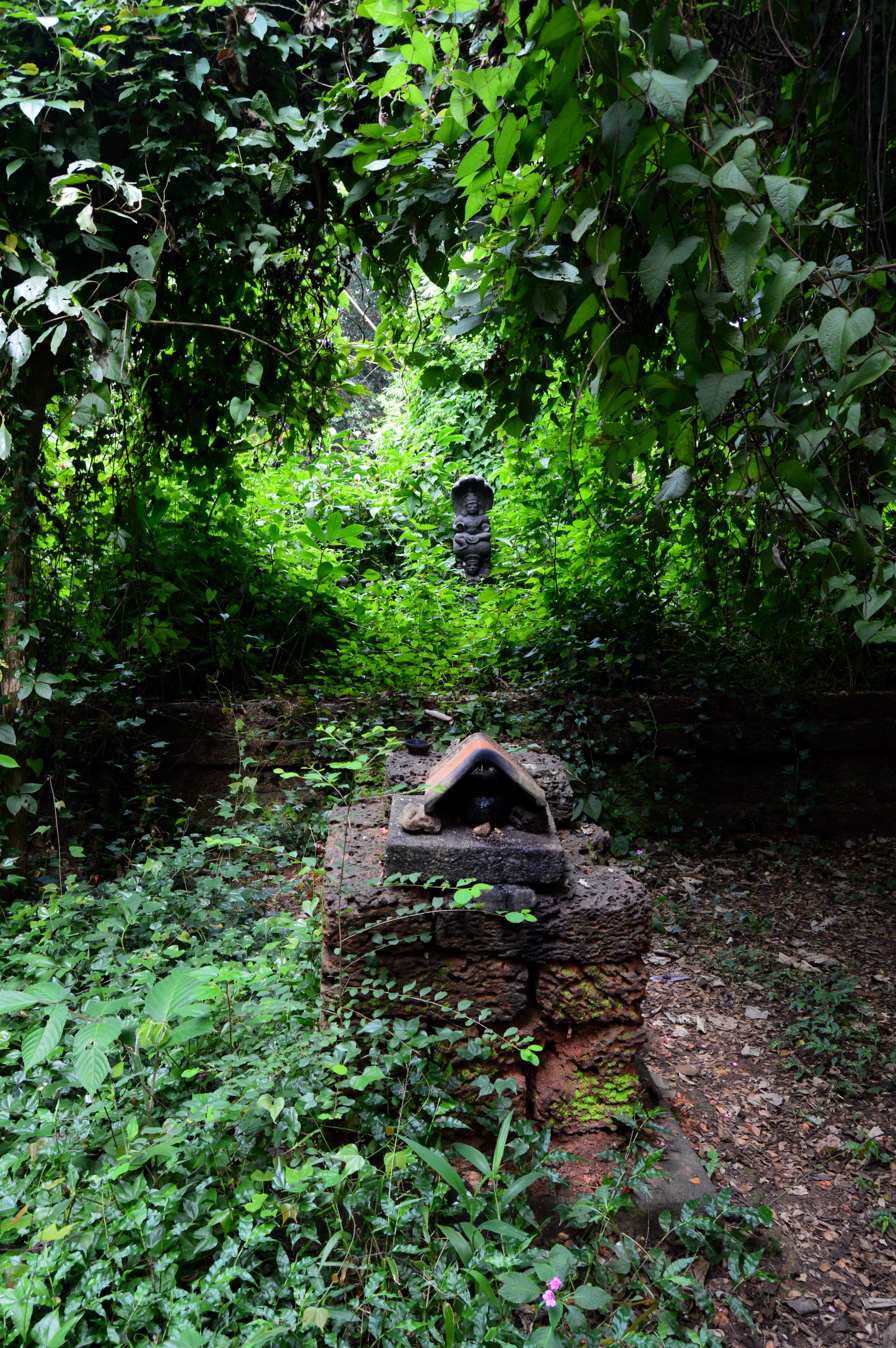
Front view of the serpent grove

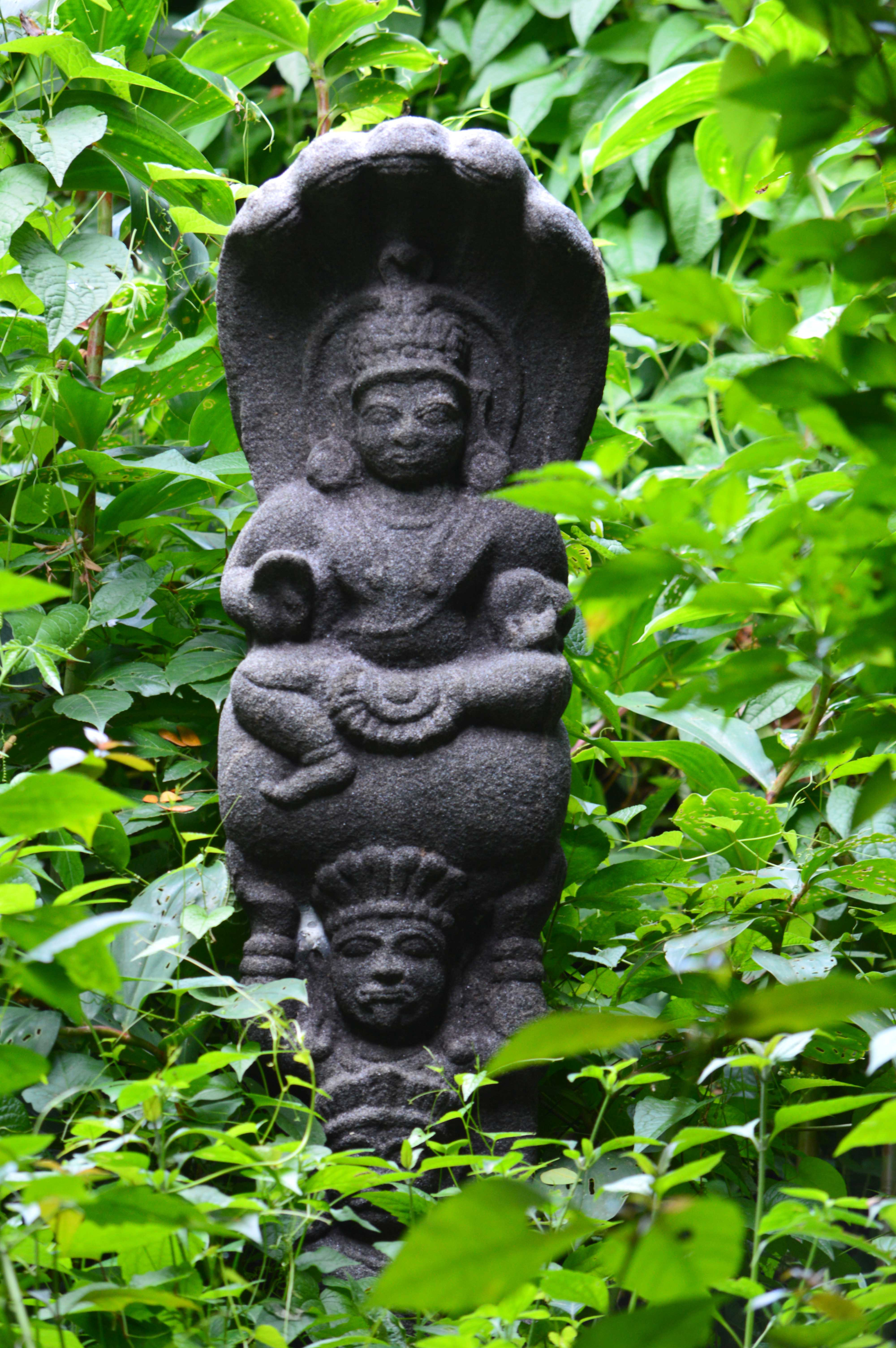
Nagaraja under a Saptarna Tree

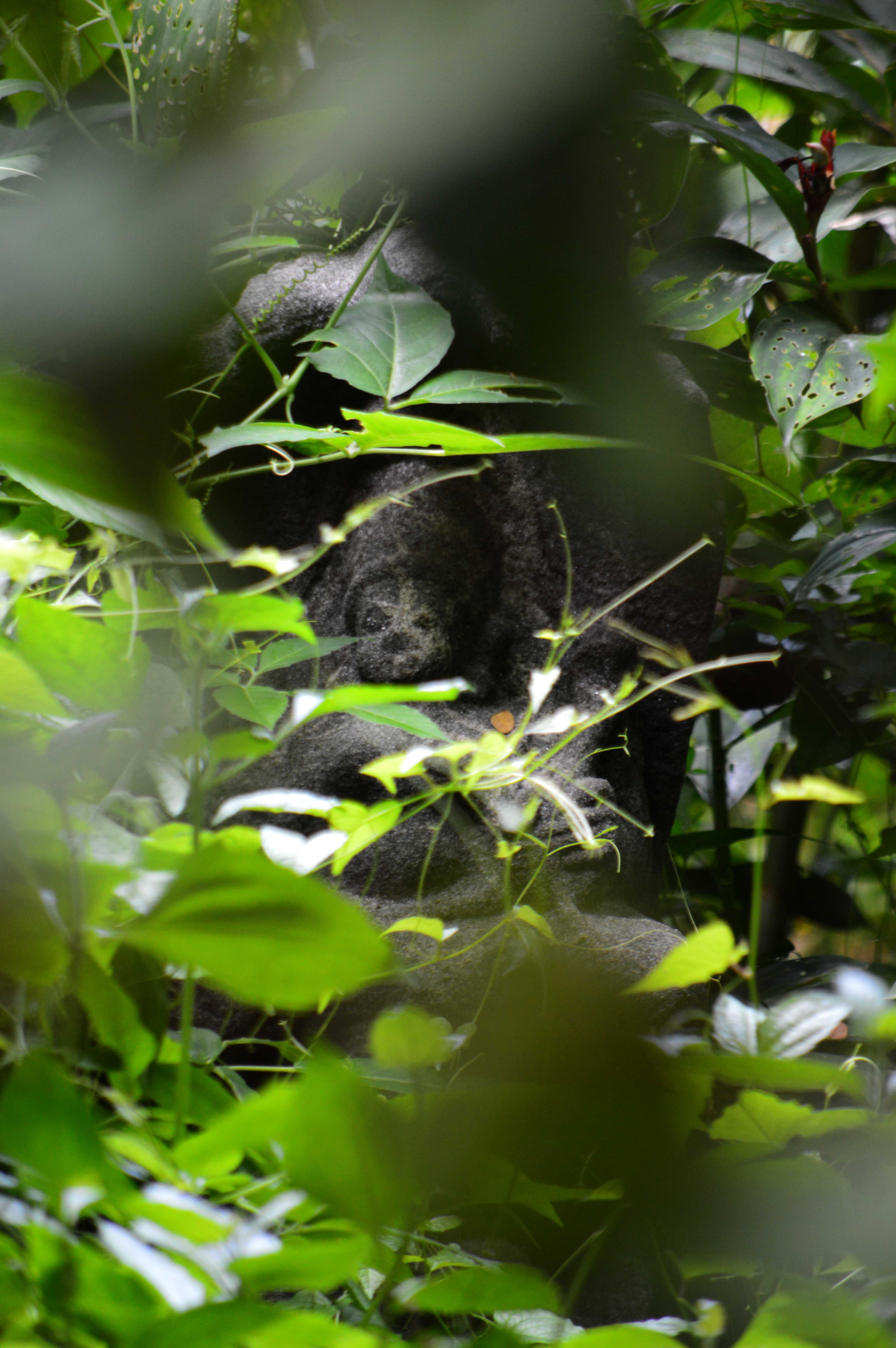
Nagayakshi under a Saptarna Tree
