= Rama Varma XI =

Maharaja of Cochin
- Reign: August 1828 – November 1837
- Coronation: August 1828
- Predecessor: Kerala Varma III
- Successor: Rama Varma XII
- Died: November 1837; Vellarapally Palace, Puthiyedam, Kaladi, now India
- Dynasty: Cochin royal family
- Religion: Hinduism

Rama Varma XI (died November 1837) was an Indian monarch who ruled the Kingdom of Cochin from 1828 to 1837.

== Reign ==
Rama Varma was the nephew of Kerala Varma III and ascended the throne on his death in August 1828. Soon after his accession, Rama Varma had differences of opinion with the Diwan Seshagiri Raya who resigned in 1830 on receiving complaints from the king. Edamana Sankara Menon was appointed as his successor. But he was sacked and imprisoned by the king in October 1834 on allegations of corruption. Venkata Subbaraya was appointed Diwan in his stead.

== Death ==
Rama Varma died in November 1837 after a reign of nine years.

Regnal titles
Preceded by Kerala Varma III	Maharaja of Cochin; 1828–1837	Succeeded by Rama Varma XII
