= Patrik Turunen =

Finnish footballer (born 1988)

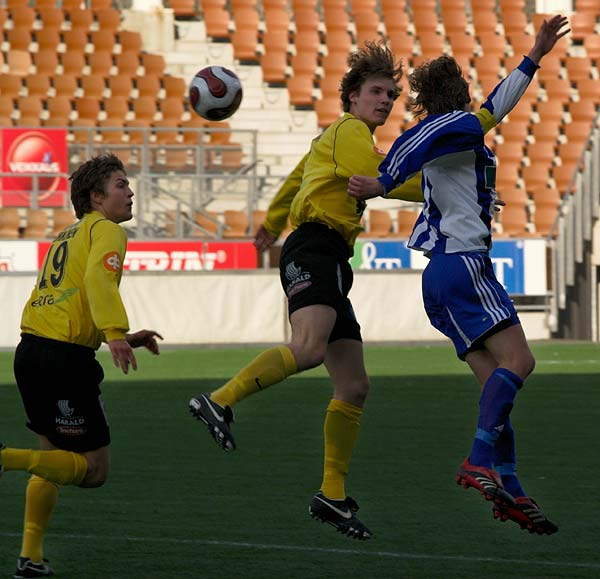

Personal information
- Date of birth: 1 July 1988 (age 38)
- Place of birth: Kuopio, Finland
- Height: 1.87 m (6 ft 1 1/2 in)
- Position: Defender

Senior career*
Years	Team	Apps	(Gls)
2004–	KuPS	55	(0)
- * Club domestic league appearances and goals as of 21 July 2010

Patrik Turunen (born 1 July 1988) is a Finnish football player who retired in 2011.

== Career ==
Turunen has had trials with FC Bayern Munich II (2005), Piacenza Calcio (2006) and 1. FC Köln. 12 December 2009 he had trials with 2.Bundesliga side SC Paderborn 07.

== Club career ==
Patrik Turunen joined clubs, Delbrücker SC and Kuopion PS.

Turunen played for German team, Delbrücker SC, from 2010 to 2011 as a defender. He also played for Finland team, Kuopion PS, from 2006 to 2010 as a defender.
