= Sakthan Thampuran =

Shakthan Thampuran
- King of Cochin
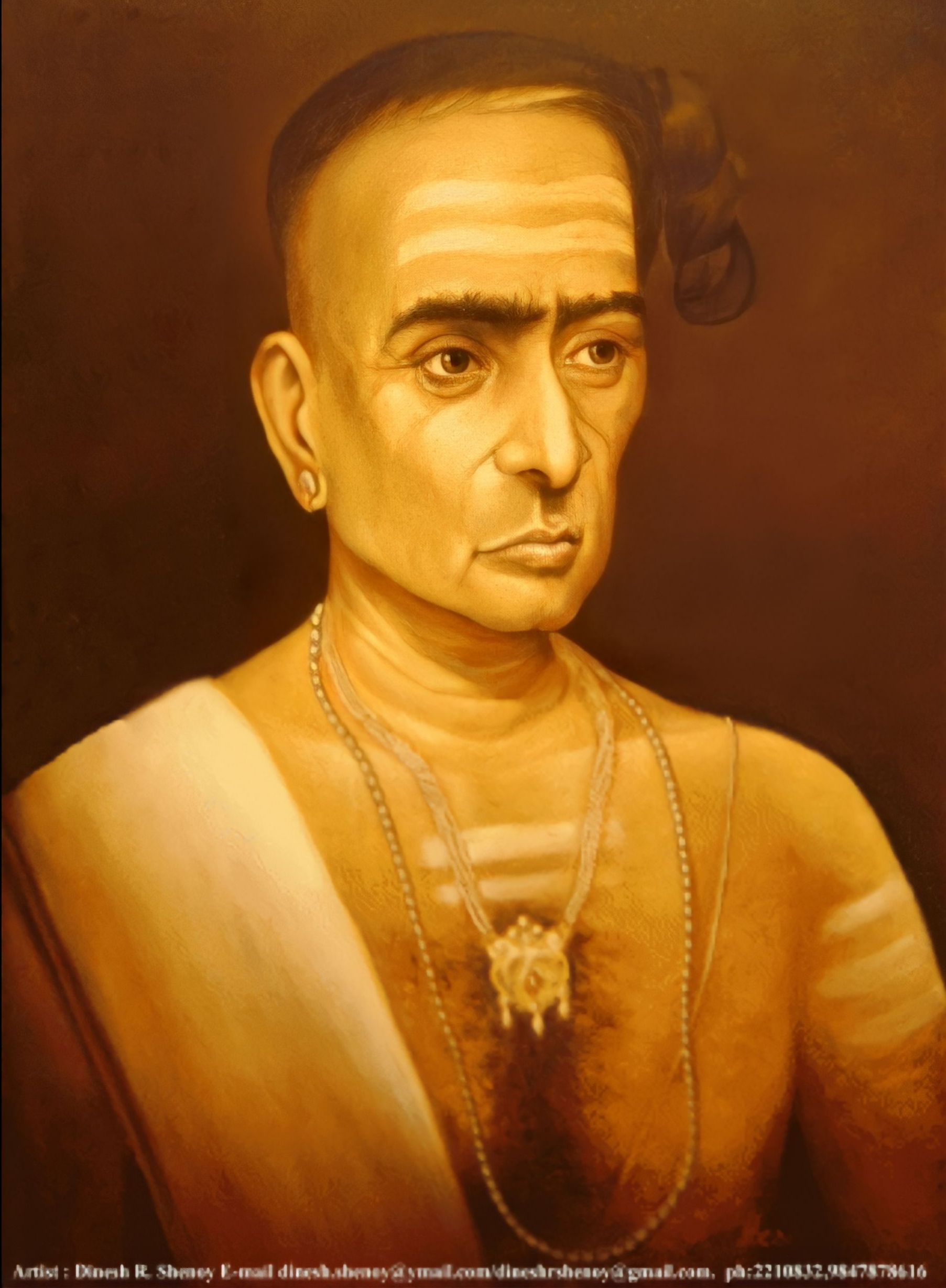
- His Excellency Raja Rama Varma Kunji Pillai Thampuran (Sakthan thamburan)

Maharaja of Cochin
- Reign: 16 August 1790 – 26 September 1805
- Coronation: 1791
- Predecessor: Rama Varma VIII
- Successor: Rama Varma X
- Born: 26 July 1751; Vellarapally Palace, Puthiyedam, Kaladi
- Died: 26 September 1805 (aged 54); Vadakkechira Palace Thrissur
- Burial: Thrissur
- Spouse: Chummukutty Nethyar Amma
Names
- Raja Rama Varma Kunji Pillai Thampuran
Regnal name
- Rama Varma IX
- Malayalam: രാജാ രാമ വര്‍മ്മ
- Dynasty: Cochin royal family
- Father: Chennas Anujan Namboodiripad
- Mother: Ambika Thampurati
- Religion: Hinduism

Rama Varma Kunji Pillai Thampuran (1751–1805), or Rama Varma IX, popularly known as Sakthan Thampuran (Sakthan meaning powerful), was the ruler of the Kingdom of Cochin. The current southern Indian city of Kochi was part of the erstwhile princely state of Kochi. He resided at Vadakkechira Palace in Thrissur. The city of Thrissur is referred to as the Cultural Capital of Kerala owing to its many traditional festivals and historic temples. Sakthan Thampuran was the planner of the city of Thrissur. The festival Thrissur Pooram was started by him.

== Biography ==
=== Early life ===
Sakthan Thampuran was born on 26 August 1751 AD at Vellarapally Palace to Anujan Namboodiripad of the Chennamangalam Mana and Ambika Thampuratti of the Cochin Royal Family. His mother died when he was only three years old. The prince was brought up by his maternal aunt, famously known as Chittamma (meaning mother's younger sister) Thampuran. His early education took place under the tutelage of scholars such as Kallenkara Pisharody. Sakthan Thampuran was considered the most powerful of the Kochi Maharajas as his name indicates.

=== Marriage ===
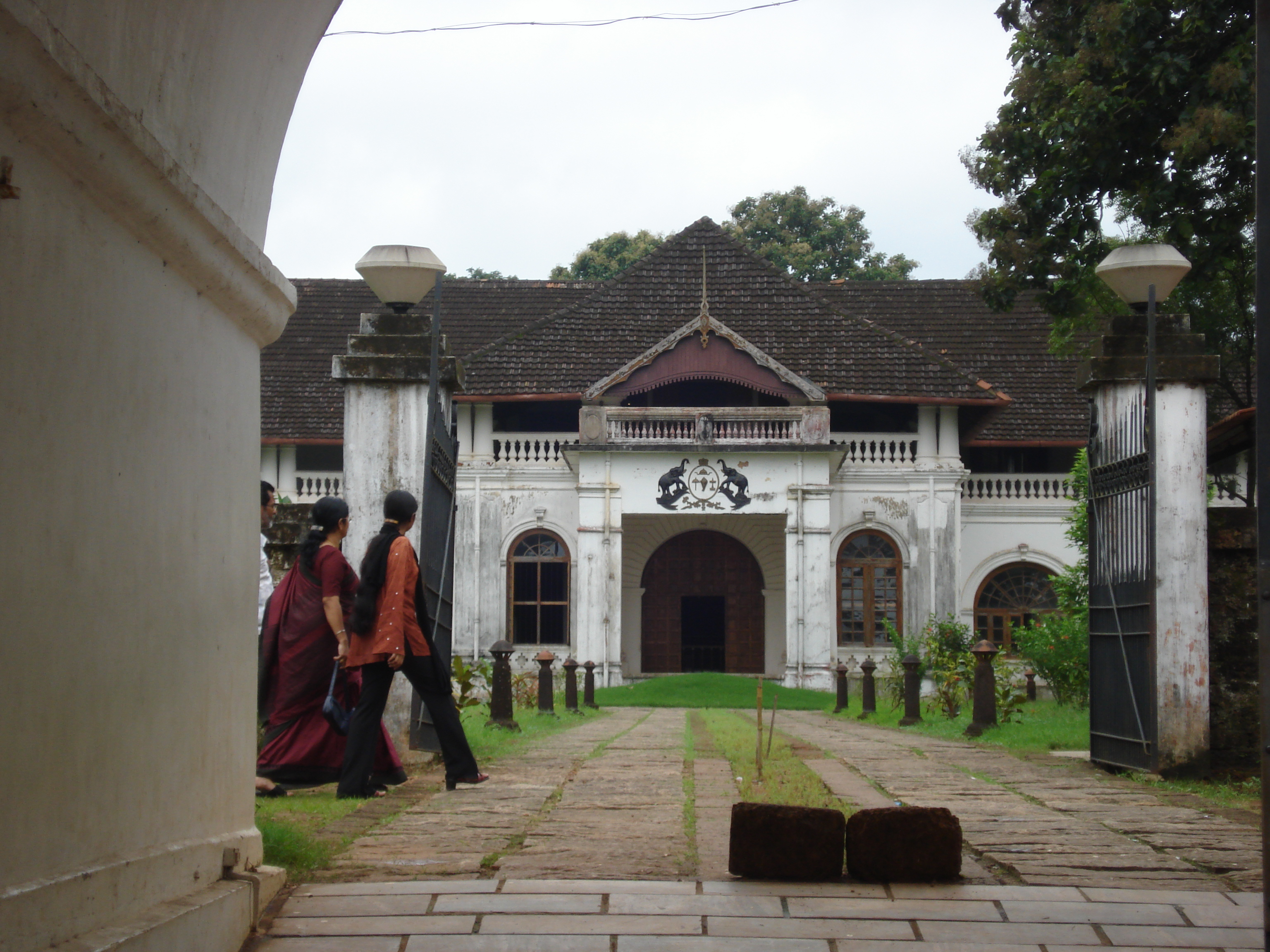
A view of the entrance of Shakthan Thampuran Palace where he was cremated.

Thampuran was married twice. His first wife came from the renowned “Vadakke Kuruppath” family of Thrissur, and he married her when he was 30. It is said that he had a daughter with his first wife. However, Nethyar Amma, the title given to the consort of the Cochin Rajah, died soon after the birth. The Thampuran then remained unmarried for several decades before marrying again at the age of 52. His second wife was Chummukutty Nethyar Amma, a musician and dancer from the Karimpatta family. She was 17 years old when she married the Thampuran. The Thampuran died four years after their marriage. As widowed Nethyar Ammas did not receive financial support from the state at the time, Chummukutty returned to her ancestral home at the age of 21.

=== Death ===
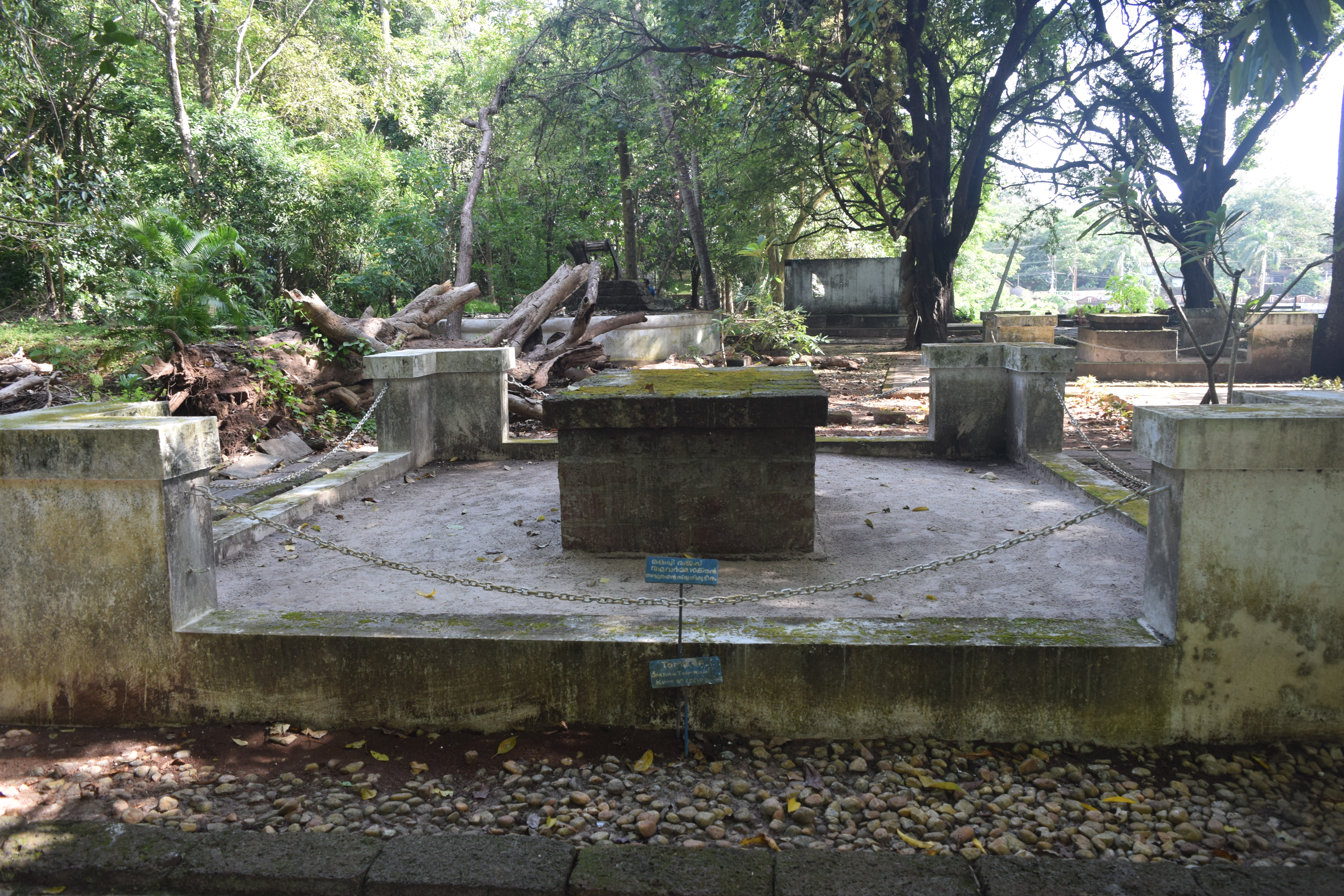
Tomb commemorating Ramavarma Sakthan Thamburan, king Kochi. Monument in palace Toppumkaadu (Vadakkechira Palace compound)

After his 55th birthday, Sakthan Thampuran fell ill and died on 26 September 1805, at Thrissur City. He was cremated at Vadakkechira Palace, now renamed Shakthan Thampuran Palace, Thrissur. There is a monument to him within the palace grounds. His palace in Thrissur City is preserved as a state monument. He is credited with the development of Thrissur City and also making it the Cultural Capital of Kerala.

== Administration ==
In 1762, ten tehsils (Kovilakathum vathukkals) and two Edavagas (semi tehsils) were formed in the Kochi Kingdom. But the previous feudal chieftains maintained their stronghold. After Thampuran ascended the throne of Kingdom of Cochin, he took over the land from the feudal chieftains and consolidated the royal power. At that time, the Vadakkunnathan Temple and Peruvanam Mahadeva Temple were controlled by the Namboodiri community, called Yogiatiripppads. The Yogiatiripppads was elected from different temples in the Thrissur District. Thampuran wrested the control of the temples and abolished the system of Yogiatiripppads. Thampuran's strict approach with criminals earned his name, Sakthan. During the British Raj, British authorities had good relations with Thampuran. He was also a personal friend of Dharma Raja of Travancore.

== Legacy ==
=== City of Thrissur ===
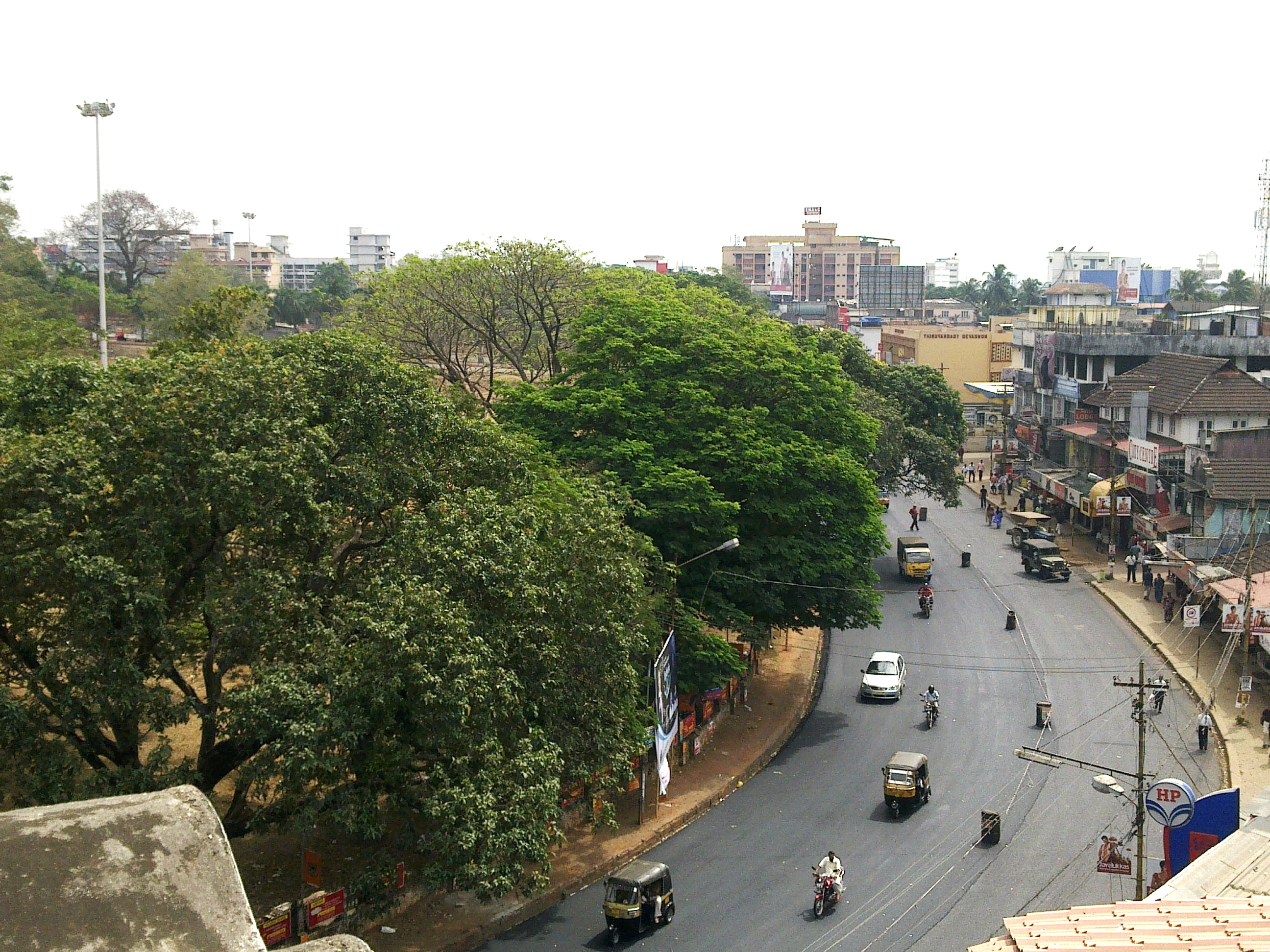
A bird's view of Swaraj Round which was built by Sakthan Thampuran

The modern day city of Thrissur owes its origin to Sakthan Thampuran. The reason for his love of the city was because his two wives were both born here. They belonged to the Kuruppath and Karimpatta families of Thrissur. Sakthan Thampuran transferred his capital from Thrippunithura to Thrissur to found the city. He cleared the 60-acre (24 ha) teak forests around the Vadakkunnathan Temple and developed the Thekkinkadu Maidan, which is now at the heart of the city. After clearing the forest, he built a circular concrete road now known as Swaraj Round.

=== Thrissur Pooram ===
The Thrissur Pooram or "Mother of all Poorams", as it was known, was the brainchild of Sakthan Thampuran. At the time, Arattupuzha Pooram was the largest temple festival in Kerala. Temples in and around the city of Thrissur were regular participants. Once, they were denied entry to Arattupuzha Pooram because they were late. All the late participant temples went to Sakthan Thampuran, then Maharaja of Cochin, and complained about the issue. Thampuran invited all the temples to bring their deities to Thrissur and pay obeisance to Lord Shiva, the deity of the Vadakkunnathan Temple. Thampuran classified the participants into two groups, the Western and the Eastern. The Western group consisted of the Thiruvambady, Kanimangalam, Laloor, Ayyanthole, and Nethilakkavu temples while the Paramekkavu, Karamukku, Chembukavu, Choorakottukavu and Panamukkamppilly temples came under the eastern group.

=== Shakthan Thampuran Palace ===
Named after Shakthan Thampuran, the palace is spread over 6 acres (2.4 ha) of Thrissur and was earlier known as Vadakkechira Kovilakam. It is one of the most historic cultural and architecturally relevant palace of the erstwhile Maharaja of Cochin, which has now been converted into a heritage museum. The palace is now a blend of traditional Kerala and Dutch architectural styles following its 1795 reconstruction.

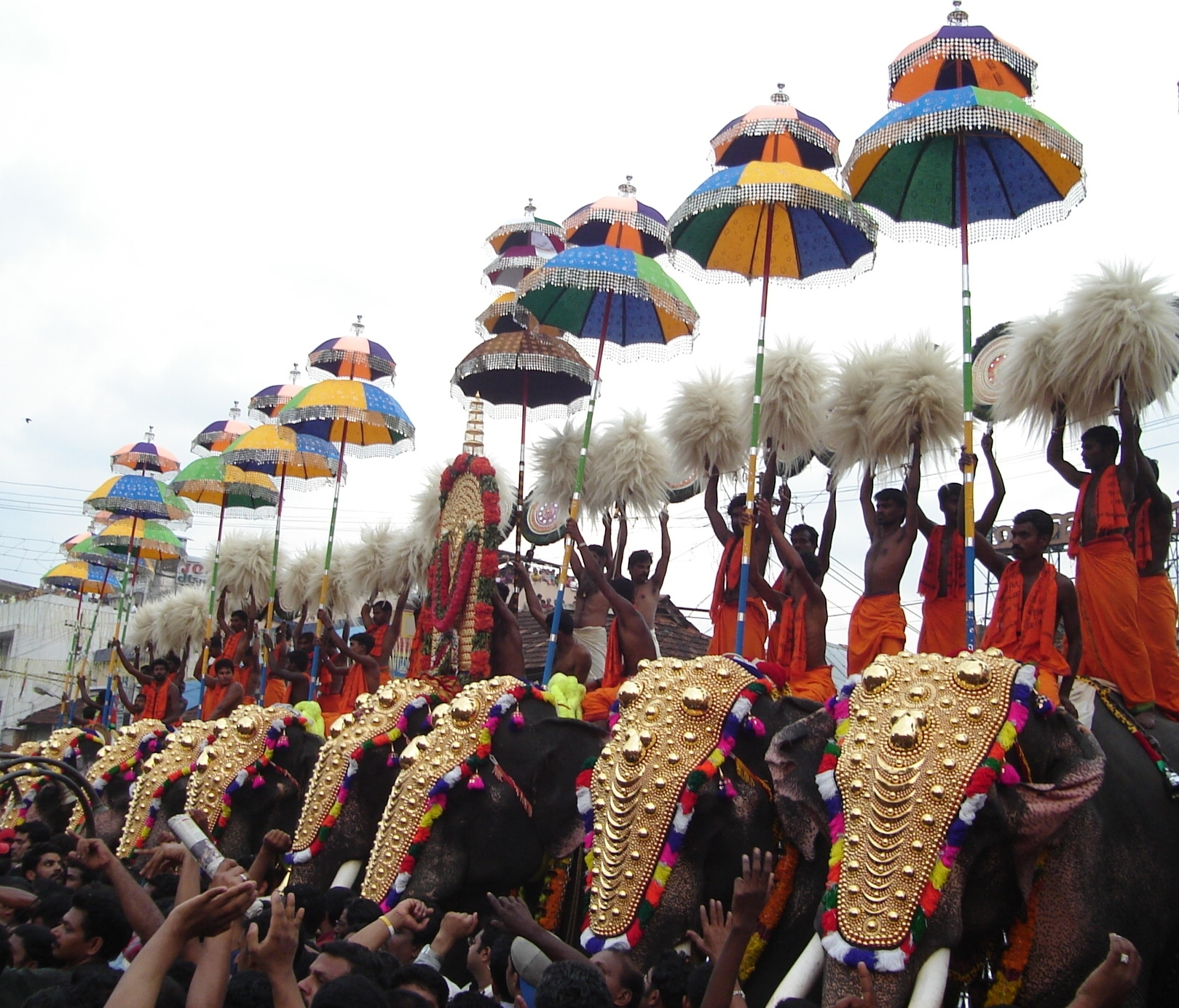
Battle of the colourfull umbrellas (Kudamattam) during the Thrissur Pooram

== See also ==
- Timeline of Thrissur
- Thrissur Pooram
- Thrissur
- Kerala
- Perumpadapu Swaroopam
- Kingdom of Cochin

Regnal titles
Preceded by Rama Varma VIII	Maharaja of Cochin; 1790–1805	Succeeded by Rama Varma X
