= Varman, Rajasthan =

Varman
- village
- Country: India
- State: Rajasthan

Population
  - Total: 3,387

Hindi, Marwadi, Gujarati
  - Official: Hindi
- Time zone: UTC+5:30 (IST)
- ISO 3166 code: RJ-IN
- Vehicle registration: RJ-

Varman is a village in Sirohi District of Rajasthan state in India. It is 45 km from Abu Road. The population of Varman is 3387. Male population is 1770 and female population is 1617. Varman is known for the Brahaman Swami or Sun Temple which follows the same traditional artistic style of Konark and Dashpur Sun Temples.

It is the oldest sun temple in the country. The architectural beauty of the sun temple is magnificent. The stone carving work on the pillars, domes, pradakshina shows the artistic inheritances of the Sirohi region. The carving works on the domes and roof of the temple have equivalence to that of Delwara Jain Temple of Mount Abu.

This Sun Temple was destructed by Alauddin khilji during his Gujarat invasion The place was famous for Sun Temple which is known as Brahmana Swami.

During the reign of Paramara ruler Vikramasimha of Chandravati the temple was rebuilt in 1299 AD by Lalitadevi, wife of Paratihara Raja Vinnada.temple has lost its past glory and now only few remains of the temple are cited at Varman which includes damaged idols, broken pillars, remains of falling roof. Stone scripts says that this temple was attacked and destroyed by Allauddin Khilji during his Gujarat triumph.

There is a Jain temple of Bhagvan shri Mahavir and also the temple of Varmesvara (Shiva). Brahmanaka Gachchha originated from this place. Jirawala Parswanath is 5 km. and Revdar is 3 km. away from Varman.

Revdar is 7.9 km and Jirawala 14.1 km from Varman.
