= Ravi Varma IV =

Maharaja of Cochin, India (d. 1864)

Ravi Varma IV (died February 1864) was an Indian monarch who ruled the Kingdom of Cochin from 1853 to 1864.

== Reign ==
Ravi Varma was the younger brother of Kerala Varma IV and succeeded the latter on his death at Benares in February 1853. Ravi Varma was not a capable monarch and his rule was marked by consecutive administrations of his highly acclaimed Diwans. After the death of his Diwan T. Sankara Warrier, he appointed Venkata Rayar as Diwan. However, they had disagreements and Venkata Rayar was sacked and replaced by Thottakattu Sankunni Menon.

== Death ==
Ravi Varma died in February 1864 in Thripunithura. Since he died in the Malayalam month of Makaram, he is known as 'Makaramasathil Theepetta Thamburan' (The king who died in the month of Makaram).

Regnal titles
Preceded by Kerala Varma IV	Maharaja of Cochin; 1853–1864	Succeeded by Rama Varma XIV
