= Varma (icebreaker) =

Latvian icebreaking salvage tug

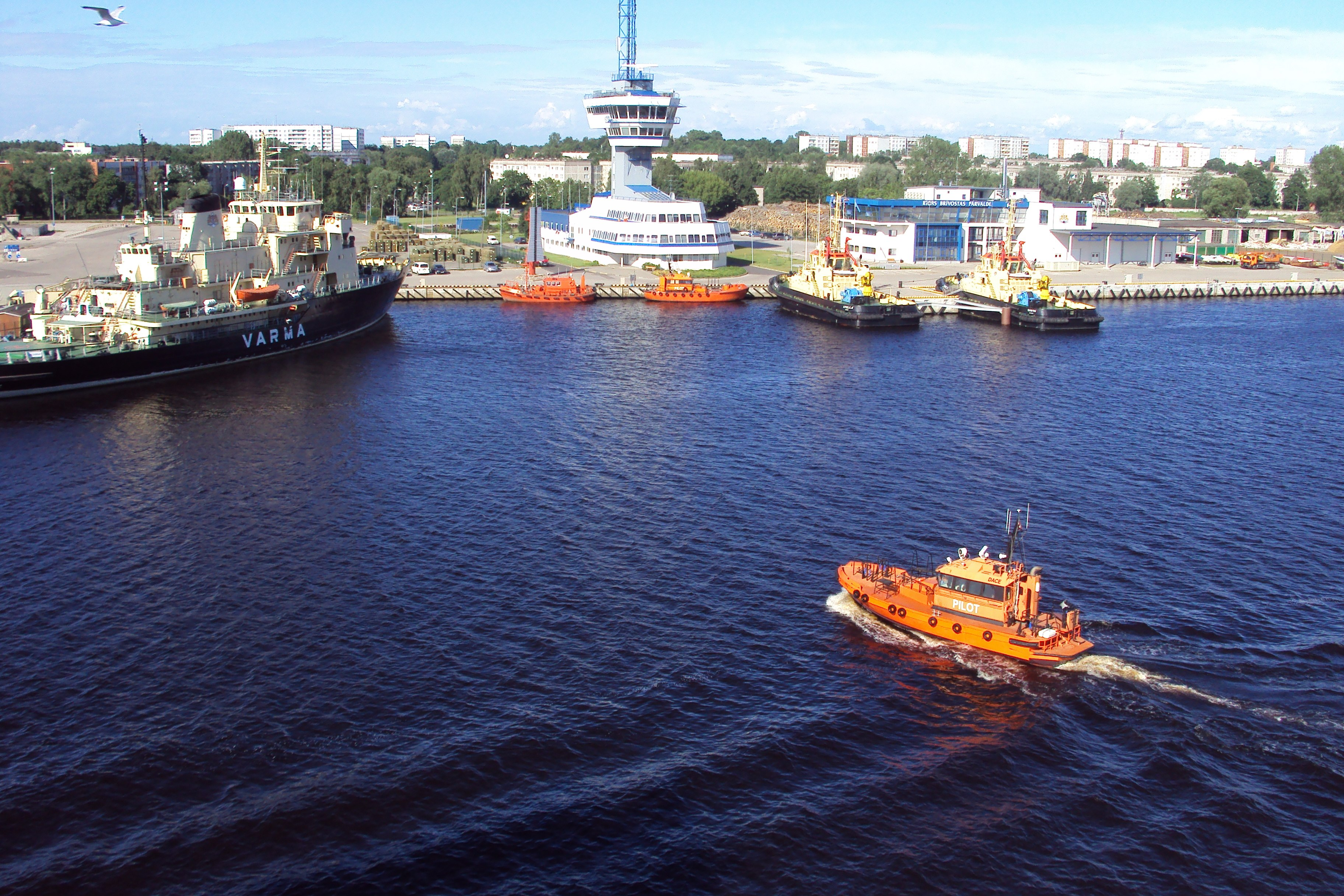
- Varma in the Freeport of Riga.

History

Latvia
- Name: Varma
- Namesake: Finnish for "certain", "sure", "confident".
- Owner: LVR Flote SIA
- Builder: Oy Wärtsilä Ab Helsinki Shipyard, Helsinki, Finland
- Yard number: 387
- Launched: 1968
- Identification: IMO number: 6814245; MMSI number: 275187000; Call sign: YLKV
- Status: In service

General characteristics
- Type: Icebreaker
- Tonnage: 4,271 GT
- Length: 86.5 m (284 ft)
- Draught: 21.2 m (70 ft)
- Depth: 9 m (30 ft)
- Installed power: 10165 KW / 4 × 3440.8 13763.2 hp / Wärtsilä-Sulzer 8MH51 - diesels
- Speed: 18

Varma is a Latvian icebreaker. She was built at the Wärtsilä Helsinki Shipyard, Finland and delivered to the Finnish National Board of Navigation in 1968. The icebreaker was sold by Finland to Latvia in 1994, for 40 million Finnish marks.
