= Rama Varma XIV =

Maharaja of Cochin (1848–1888)

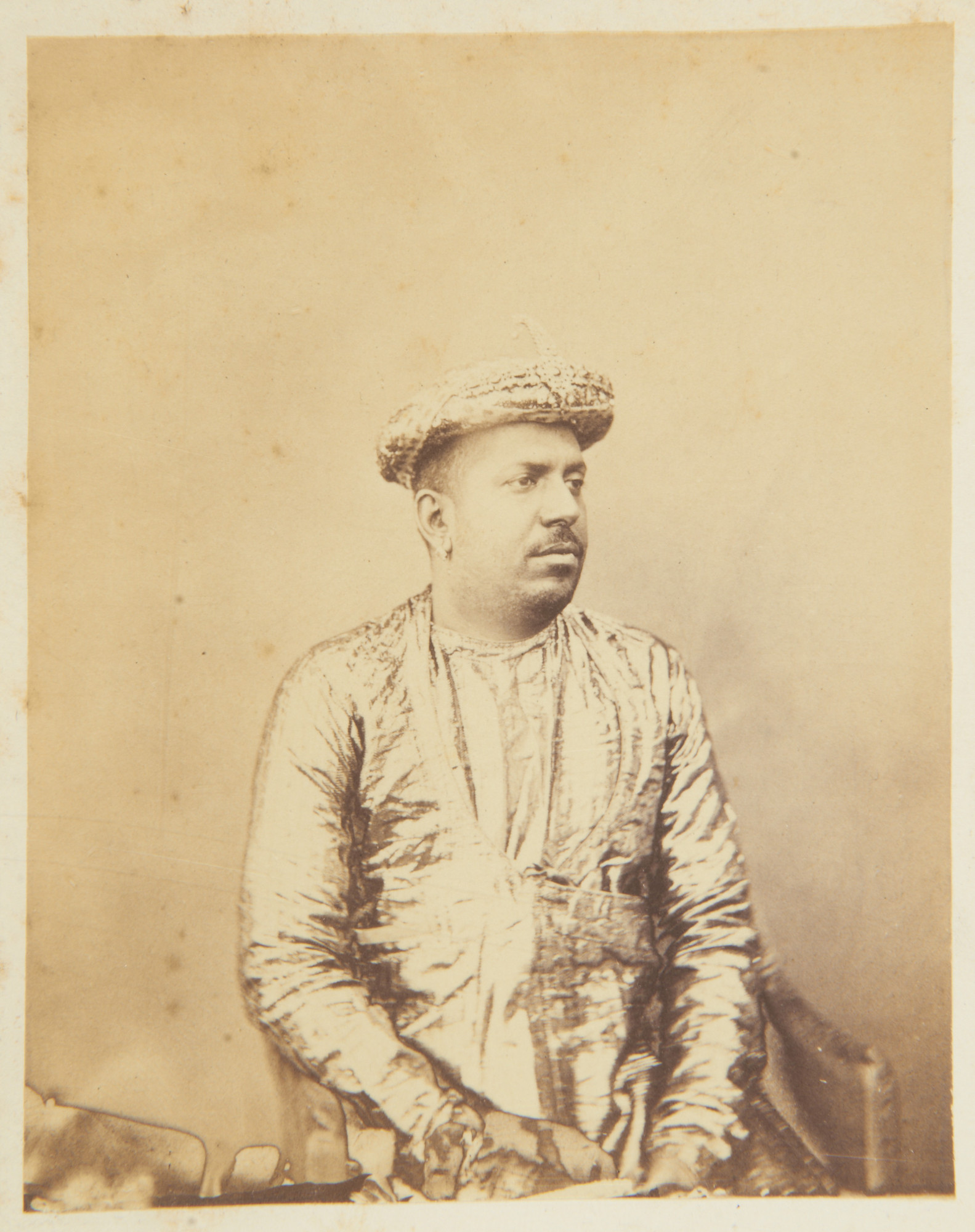
Rajah of Cochin. Circa 1868

Sir Rama Varma XIV KCSI (1848–1888) was the ruler of the Kingdom of Cochin from 1864 to 1888. He was the first Maharajah of Cochin to be knighted.

== Reign ==
Rama Varma was the nephew of his predecessor Ravi Varma IV. Rama Varma was an extremely weak monarch and was afflicted by illness throughout his reign. The administration was handled mostly by his Diwans - T. Sankunni Menon till 1879 and his brother T. Govinda Menon from 1879 onwards. Govinda Menon arranged a meeting between Rama Varma XIV and the Maharaja of Travancore at Thiruvananthapuram and Tripunithara. Rama Varma attended upon the Prince of Wales Albert Edward at Madras in 1876, during his visit to India. Rama Varma built the Puthen Bungalow and Mani Malika at Thrippunithura.

== Death ==
Rama Varma died at Thrippunithura in July 1888.

== Honours ==
In acknowledgement of his loyalty to the British Crown, Rama Varma was made a Knight Commander of the Order of the Star of India.

Regnal titles
Preceded by Ravi Varma IV	Maharaja of Cochin; 1864–1888	Succeeded by Kerala Varma V
