= Rama Varma XIII =

Maharaja of Cochin from 1844 to 1851

Rama Varma XIII (died July 1851) was an Indian monarch who ruled the Kingdom of Cochin from 1844 to 1851.

== Reign ==
Rama Varma was a nephew of Rama Varma XII and ascended the throne on his death in June 1844. He was the son of Ekkavu Thampuran, the ancestor of the present head of the household.

== Death ==
Rama Varma XIII died in July 1851.

Regnal titles
Preceded by Rama Varma XII	Maharaja of Cochin; 1844–1851	Succeeded by Kerala Varma IV
