= Rama Varma XII =

Maharaja of Cochin

Rama Varma XII (died June 1844) was an Indian monarch who ruled the Kingdom of Cochin from 1837 to 1844.

== Reign ==
Rama Varma was a cousin of Rama Varma XI and ascended the throne on his death in November 1837. In 1840, the Diwan Venkata Subbaraya resigned and replaced with Shankara Warrier.

== Death ==
Rama Varma XII died at Irinjalakuda in June 1844. He was married Princess Chandrika Lakshmi Dwarayana of Lucknow.

Regnal titles
Preceded by Rama Varma XI	Maharaja of Cochin; 1837–1844	Succeeded by Rama Varma XIII
