= Varma K. Turunen =

Finnish trade union activist and politician

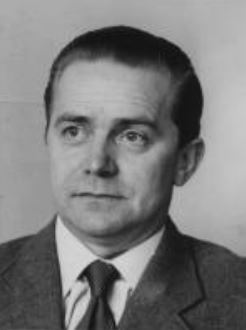
Image of Varma K. Turunen

Varma Kosto Turunen (17 March 1913, Pielisjärvi – 16 March 1994) was a Finnish trade union activist and politician. He was a Member of the Parliament of Finland from 1939 to 1962, representing the Social Democratic Party of Finland (SDP).
