= Kerala Varma IV =

Indian monarch of Kingdom of Cochin from 1851 to 1853

Kerala Varma IV (died February 1853) was an Indian monarch who ruled the Kingdom of Cochin from 1851 to 1853. He is posthumously known as Kaashiyil Theepetta Maharaja.

== Reign ==
Kerala Varma was the younger brother of Rama Varma XIII and succeeded to the throne on his death in July 1851. Soon after his accession, Kerala Varma embarked on a tour of British India in order to improve his knowledge of the country and visited Coimbatore, Bangalore, Poona, Indore and Benares. At Benares, he was afflicted by chicken pox and succumbed to the disease in February 1853 after a reign of one and half years.

Regnal titles
Preceded by Rama Varma XIII	Maharaja of Cochin; 1851–1853	Succeeded by Ravi Varma IV
