= Kerala Varma V =

Ruler of the Kingdom of Cochin from 1888 to 1895

Sir Kerala Varma V KCIE (1846–1895) was the ruler of the Kingdom of Cochin from 1888 to 1895.

== Reign ==
Kerala Varma rose to the throne after the death of his elder brother Rama Varma XIV. Kerala Varma was acclaimed for his proficiency in the English language. He was knighted (KCIE) even before his accession to the throne.

In 1893, Kerala Varma visited Benares, Gaya and Calcutta. He died on 12th September 1895 at Tripunithura.

Regnal titles
Preceded by Rama Varma XIV	Maharaja of Cochin; 1888–1895	Succeeded by Rama Varma XV
