= List of Nairs =

This is a list of notable members of the Nair community of southern India.

== Dynasties ==
- Kingdom of Travancore
- Zamorin of Calicut
- Thekkumkur Kingdom^{[32]}
- Vadakkumkur Kingdom
- Chirakkal Raja
- Porlathiri
- Kingdom of Venad
- Valluvanad
- Ernād
- Palakkad
- Kingdom of Kolathunadu
- Kavalappara Moopil Nayar
- Paliam Swaroopam

== Spiritual leaders ==
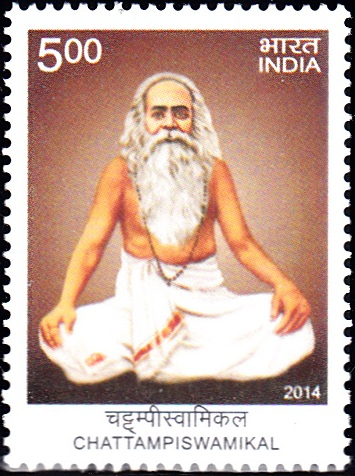
Chattampi Swamikal, Hindu sage

- Chattampi Swamikal – Hindu Sage and Social Reformer
- Swami Chinmayananda – Spiritual leader and founding father of Vishwa Hindu Parishad.
- Tapovan Maharaj, a Hindu sage and Vedanta Scholar.
- Brahmananda Swami Sivayogi, Founder of Anantha Mahasabha.
- Devasahayam Pillai – Roman Catholic Saint canonized by the Church.

== Film and media ==
=== Actresses ===
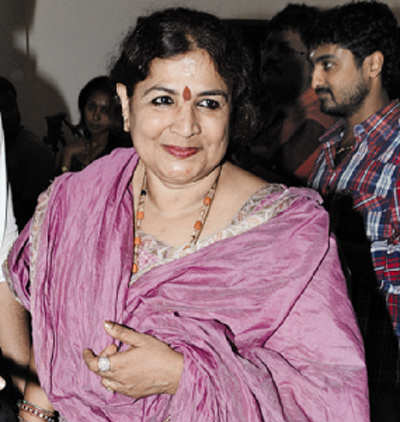
Jayabharathi, famous Indian actress

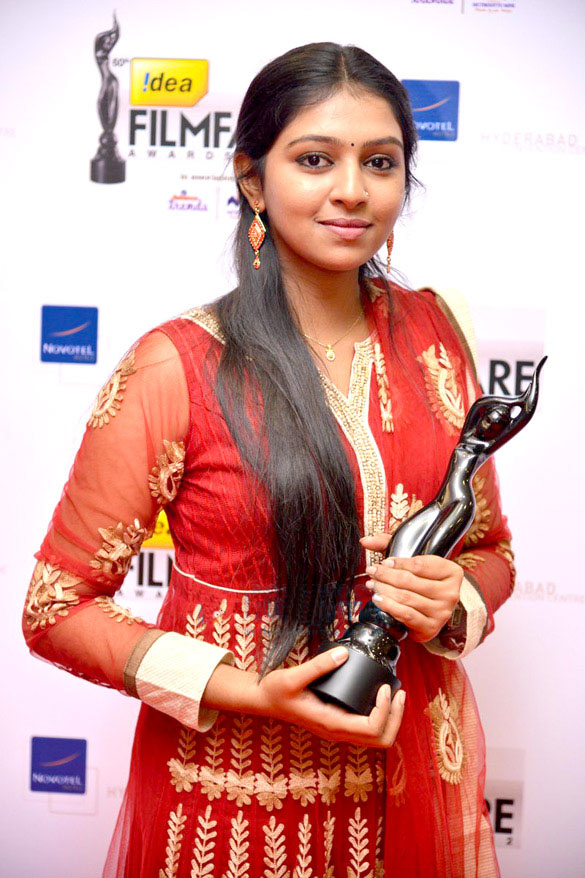
Lakshmi Menon (actress), Lakshmi Menon at 60th South Filmfare Awards 2013

- Shobhana Chandrakumar Pillai, Indian actress and bharatanatyam dancer
- Jayabharathi, Indian actress, two-time recipient of the Kerala State Film Award for best actress
- Urvashi, Prominent lead actress of the 1980s and 1990s
- Kalaranjini, Indian actress
- Parvathy Jayaram, Indian actress
- Ragini, Indian actress and dancer
- Padmini, Indian actress and trained bharatanatyam dancer
- Lalitha, Indian actress and dancer
- Ambika, Indian actress
- Revathi, Indian actress
- Seema, Indian actress
- Kalpana, Indian actress
- Sithara, Indian actress
- Suchitra Pillai, Indian actress who mainly appear in Bollywood films
- Renuka Menon, Indian actress
- Shwetha Menon, Indian actress
- Divya Pillai, Indian actress
- Sukumari, Indian actress
- K. P. A. C. Lalitha, Indian actress
- Mallika Sukumaran, Indian actress and businesswomen
- Bhavana, Indian actress who mainly appear in South-Indian Films
- Aranmula Ponnamma, Indian actress
- Bhama, Indian actress
- Ananya, Indian actress
- Anusree, Indian actress and model
- Samyuktha, Indian actress
- Jyothirmayi, Indian actress
- Shobha Mohan, Indian actress
- Jalaja, Indian actress who received Kerala State Film Award for best actress in 1981
- Bindu Panicker, Indian actress
- Niranjana Anoop, Indian actress and model
- Neeta Pillai, Indian actress and model
- Ambili Devi, Indian television actress
- Aarsha Chandini Baiju, Indian actress and model
- Iswarya Menon, Indian actress and model
- Kumari Thankam, lead actress during the late 1950s and 1960s
- Aparna Balamurali, Indian actress
- Praveena, Indian actress
- Asha Sharath, Indian actress and dancer
- Keerthy Suresh, Indian actress who mainly appear in Tamil films
- Sshivada, Indian actress
- Navya Nair, Indian actress
- Mahima Nambiar, Indian actress and model
- Sangita Madhavan, Indian actress
- Gauthami Nair, Indian actress
- Priyanka Nair, Indian actress
- Rajasree, Indian actress
- Lakshmi Menon, Indian actress who mainly appear in Tamil films
- Nithya Menen, Indian actress and singer
- Karthika Nair, Indian actress
- Radha, Indian actress
- Valsala Menon, Indian actress
- Devi Ajith, Indian actress
- Uma Nair, Indian television actress
- Aparna Nair, Indian actress
- Santhi Mayadevi, Indian actress

=== Actors ===
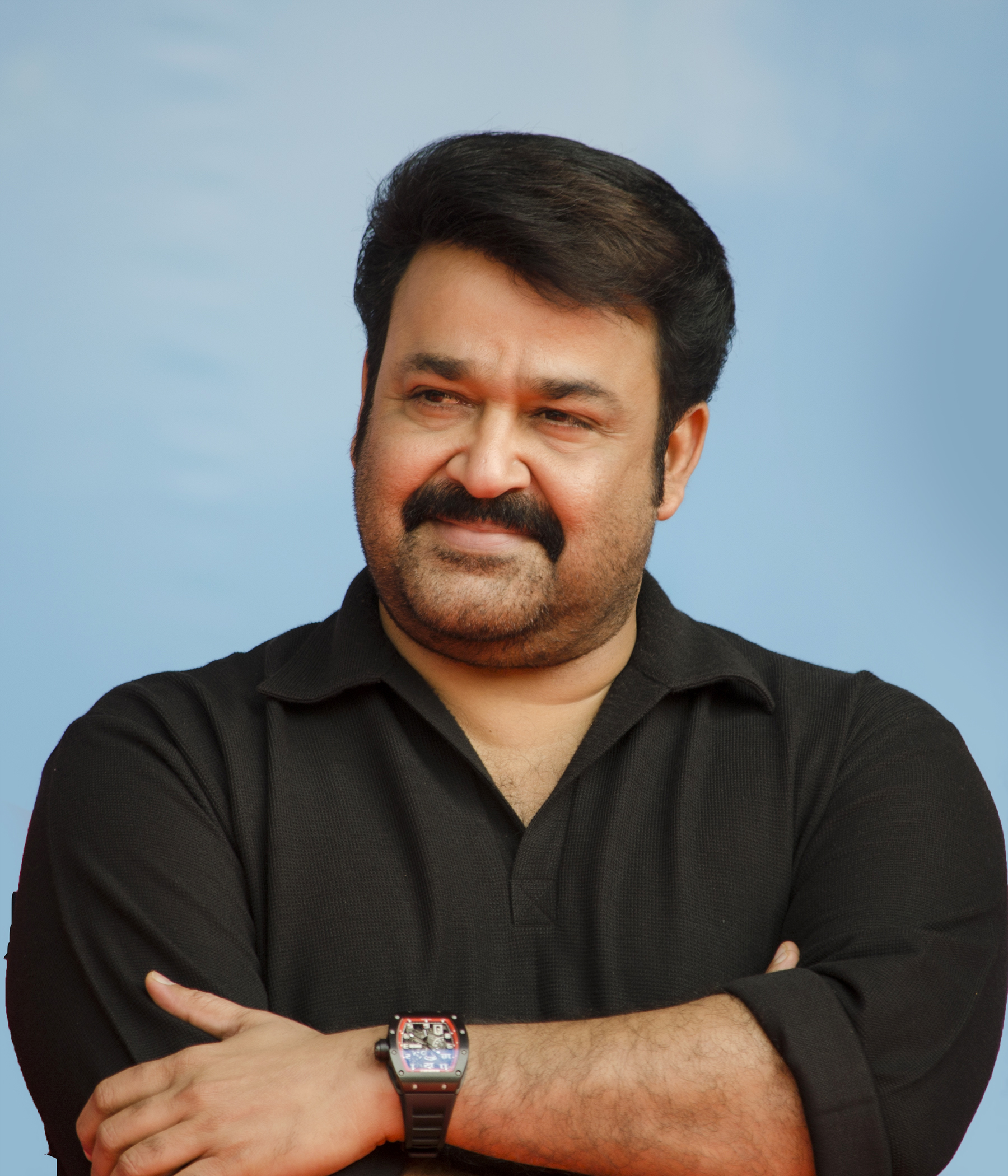
Mohanlal, famous Indian actor

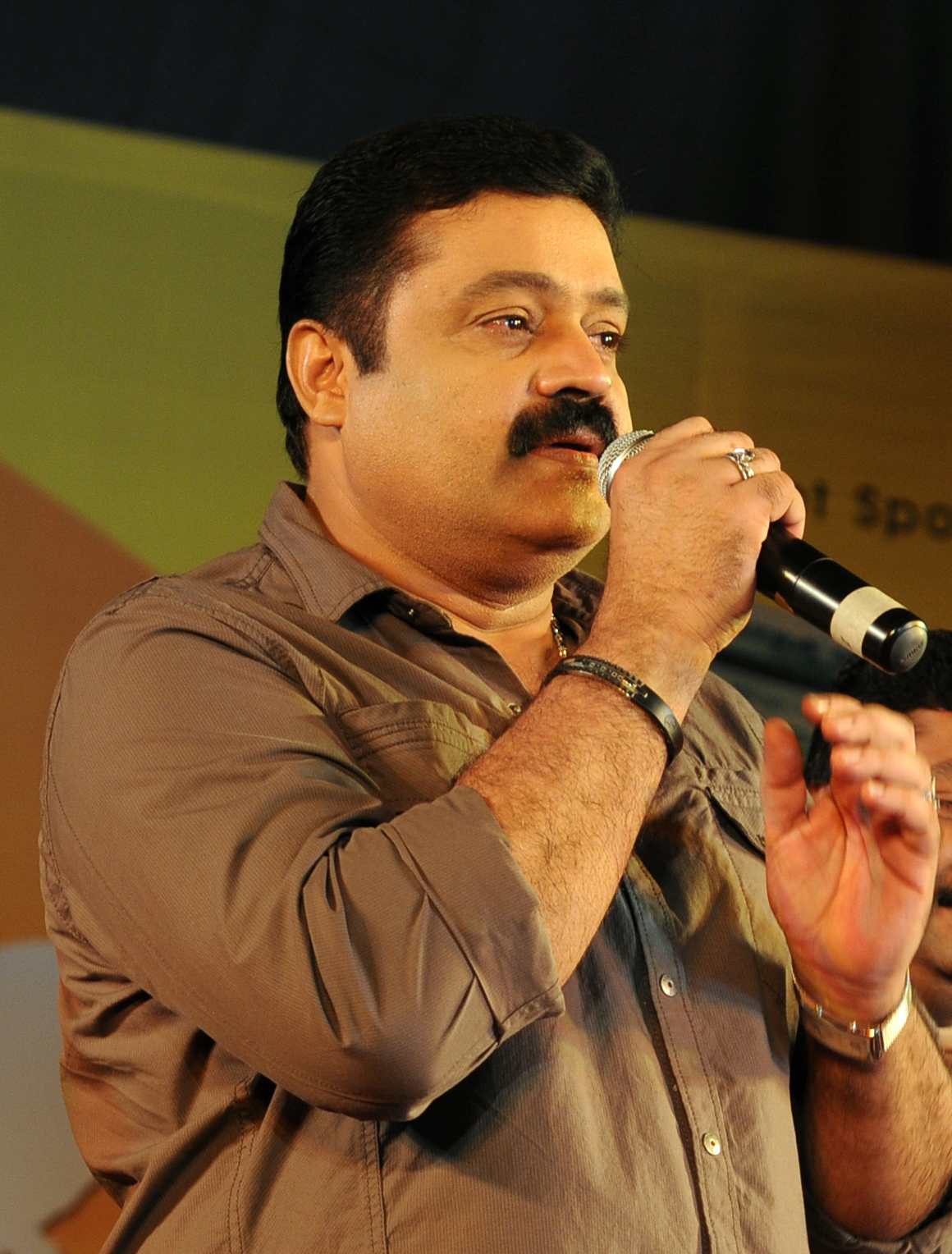
Suresh Gopi, actor and politician

- Mohanlal, Popular Indian actor, who received Padma Shri in 2001, Padma Bhushan in 2019, India's fourth and third highest civilian honours
- Suresh Gopi, Indian actor and politician
- Jayan, Indian actor, ex-naval officer and stunt performer of 1970s and 1980s
- Janardhanan Pillai, Indian actor and former Indian Air force personnel
- Kottarakkara Sreedharan Nair, Indian actor who received best actor award in 1970
- Oduvil Unnikrishnan, Indian actor who worked in Malayalam cinema
- C. V. Raman Pillai, Indian actor, novelist, playwright, journalist and social activist
- Muraleedharan Pillai, Indian actor, stage and television actor and author
- Madhavan nair, Indian actor, director, producer, former college lecturer and former film studio owner
- Balachandra Menon, Indian actor, director and script writer
- Sai Kumar, Indian actor
- M. N. Nambiar, Indian actor who worked predominantly in Tamil cinema, known mostly for his villain roles
- Bharat Gopy, Indian actor, producer and director
- Dileep, Indian actor, producer and businessman
- Nedumudi Venu, Indian actor who won three National Film Awards and Six Kerala State Film Awards
- Narendra Prasad, Indian actor
- Thikkurissy Sukumaran Nair, Indian actor, author and film director
- Prithviraj Sukumaran, Indian actor and director
- Vijayaraghavan, Indian actor
- N. N. Pillai, Indian actor and drama artist
- M. G. Soman, Indian actor
- Raghuvaran, Indian actor
- Vineeth, Indian actor and dancer
- Vinu Mohan, Indian actor
- Krishna, Indian actor
- Sukumaran, Indian actor and producer
- Santhosh K. Nayar, Indian actor
- Niranj Maniyanpilla Raju, Indian actor
- Vini Vishwa Lal, Indian actor and screenwriter
- Sudev Nair, Indian actor and model
- Indrajith Sukumaran, Indian actor
- Anoop Menon, Indian actor
- Rajeev Pillai, Indian actor and model
- Unni Mukundan, Indian actor
- Chandunath G Nair, Indian actor and model
- T. P. Madhavan, Indian actor
- Kollam G. K. Pillai, Indian actor
- Balan K. Nair, Indian actor
- Adoor Bhasi, Indian actor
- Biju Menon, Indian actor
- K. B. Ganesh Kumar, Indian actor and politician
- Kay Kay Menon, Indian actor
- Gautham Vasudev Menon, Indian actor
- Govind Padmasoorya, Indian actor
- Anu Mohan, Indian actor
- Vanchiyoor Madhavan Nair, actor in Malayalam movies of the 1960s and 1970s
- T. K. Balachandran, Indian actor
- Gokul Suresh, Indian actor
- Sankaradi, Indian actor
- S. P. Pillai, Indian actor
- Kozhikode Narayanan Nair, Indian actor
- Karamana Janardanan Nair, Indian actor
- Sudheesh, Indian actor
- Krishna Kumar, Indian actor and politician
- Adithya Menon, Indian actor
- Vijay Babu, Indian actor
- Jayan Cherthala, Indian actor
- Baiju Santhosh, Indian actor
- Narain, Indian actor
- Jagadish, Indian actor
- Suraj Venjaramoodu, Indian actor
- Sajan Surya, Indian television actor
- Rajeev Parameshwar, Indian television actor
- Jayakumar Parameswaran Pillai, Indian television actor
- Sreejith Vijay, Indian actor

=== Models and dancers ===
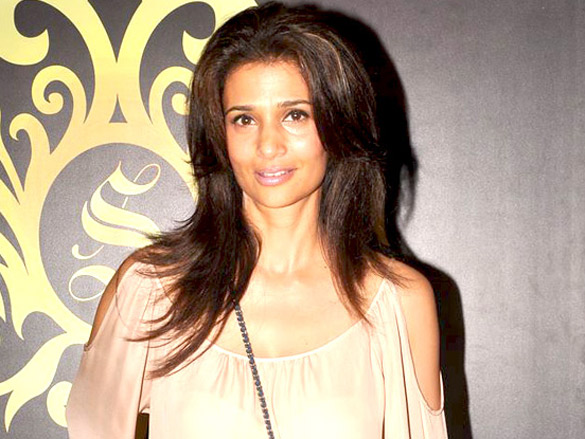
Rhea Pillai, Indian model

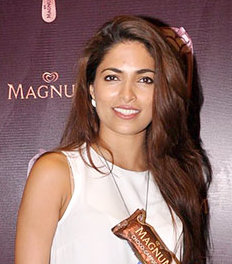
Parvathy Omanakuttan, Indian model, actress and beauty pageant titleholder

- Rhea Pillai, Indian model
- Methil Devika, Indian dancer and researcher
- Vineeth, Indian dancer and actor
- Parvathy Omanakuttan, Indian model
- Asha Sharath, Indian dancer and actress
- Parvati Nair, Indian model
- Thulasi Nair, Indian model

=== Directors, producers, and script writers ===
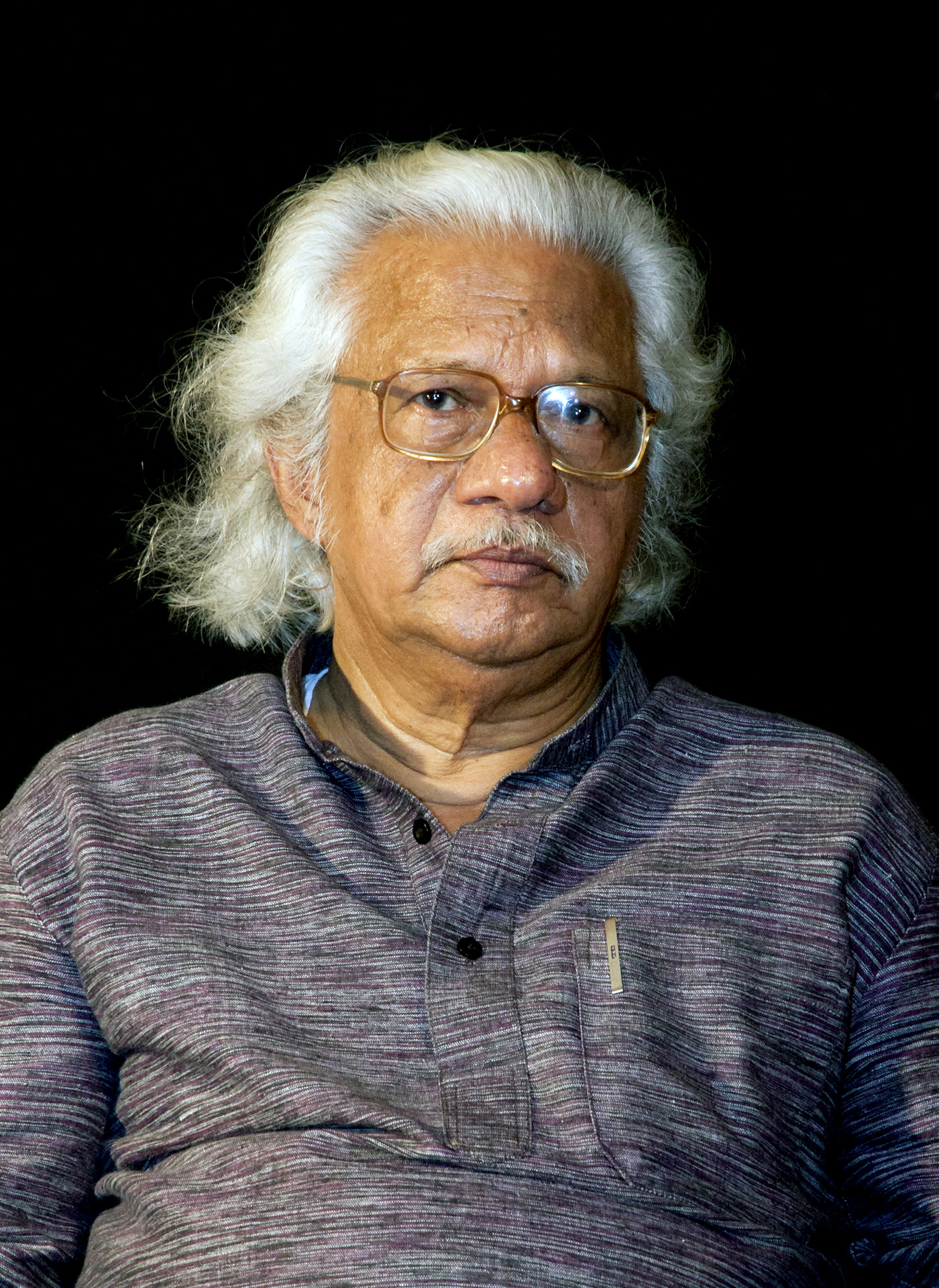
Adoor Gopalakrishnan, Indian film director, script writer, and producer

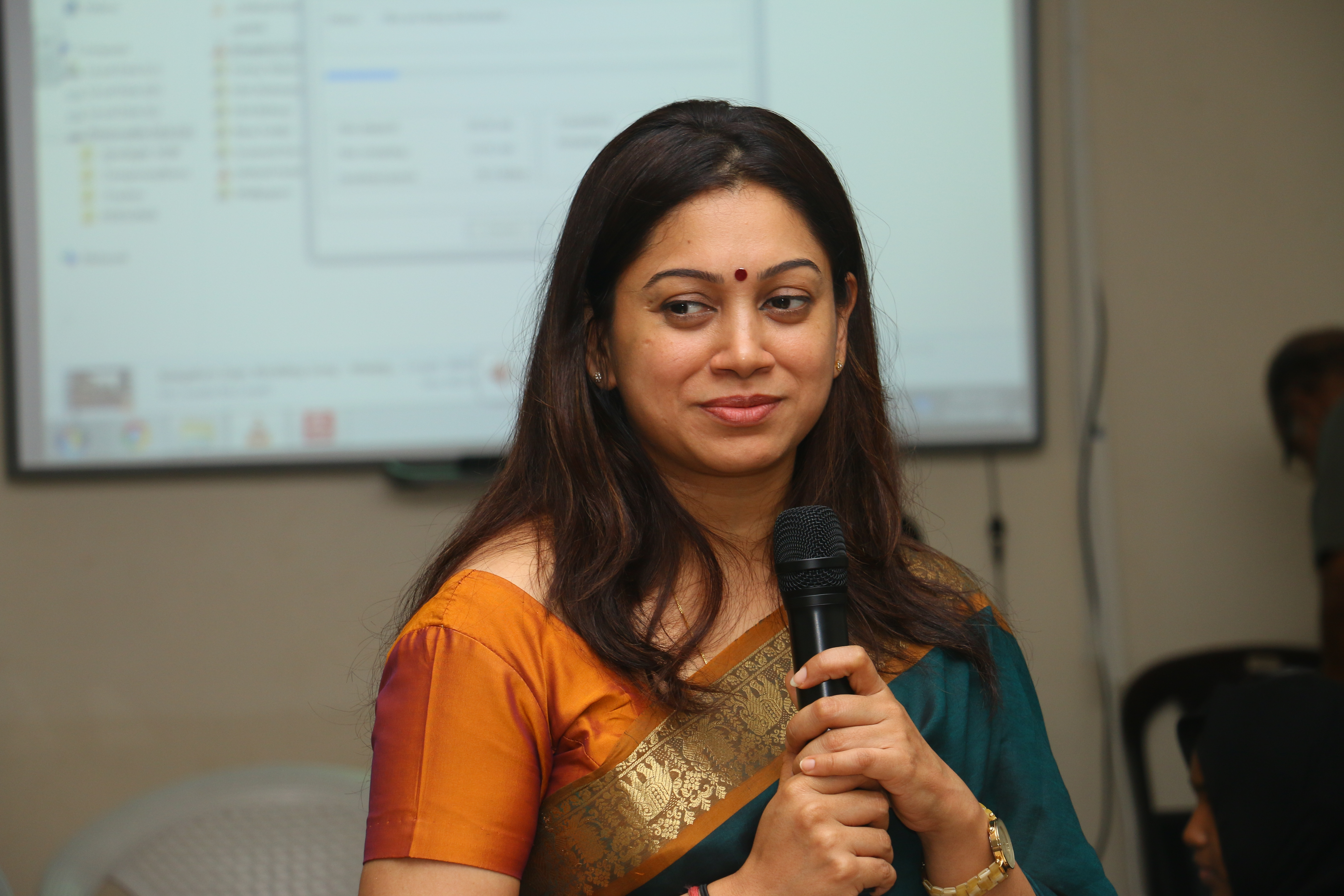
Anjali Menon, Indian filmmaker

- Padmarajan, Indian film-maker and screenwriter
- Ranjith, Indian film director and screenwriter
- Thoppil Bhasi, Indian playwright and screenwriter
- K. Ravindranathan Nair, Indian film producer
- Bharathan, Indian filmmaker
- Priyadarshan, Indian film director and screenwriter
- Shaji Kailas, Indian film director and screenwriter
- Rajasenan, Indian film director and former actor
- Adoor Gopalakrishnan, Indian film director and script writer
- Rajeev Govindan, Indian writer, lyricist and producer
- Adoor Gopalakrishnan, Indian film director
- B. Unnikrishnan, Indian film director
- Sachy, Indian screenwriter and director
- Sujith Vaassudev, Indian cinematographer
- Anjali Menon, Indian film-maker and screenwriter
- K. Madhu, Indian filmmaker
- P. Chandrakumar, Indian director and cinematographer
- Anil Radhakrishnan Menon, Indian film director
- Balu Kiriyath, Indian film director
- Sreekumaran Thampi, Indian film director
- Major Ravi, Indian actor and film director
- Sivan, Indian cinematographer and film director
- Sangeeth Sivan, Indian film director and screenwriter
- Santosh Sivan, Indian cinematographer
- N Sankaran Nair, Indian director
- K. Padmanabhan Nair, Indian film director and script writer
- Raja Krishna Menon, Indian film writer

=== Musicians ===
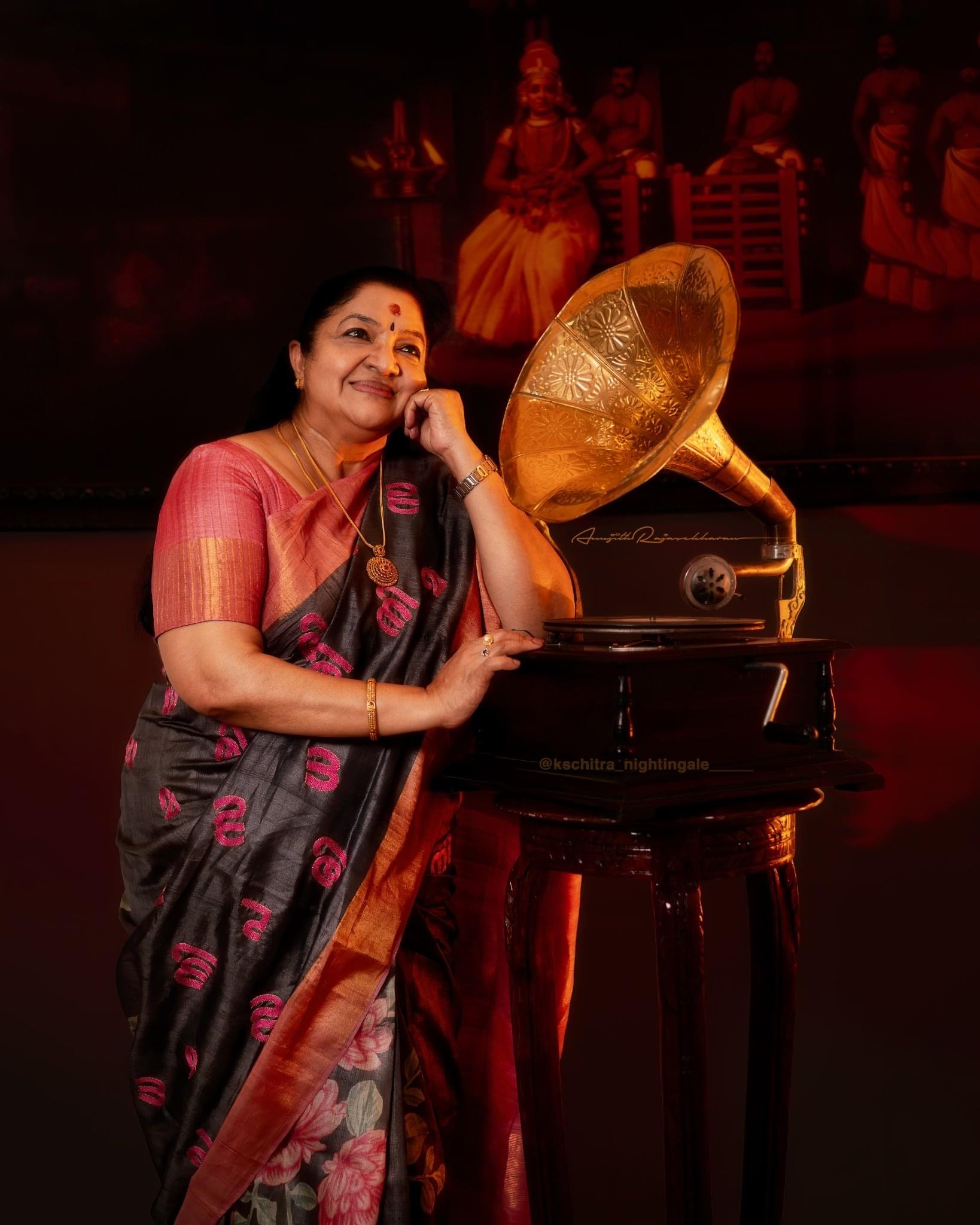
K. S. Chithra, Little Nightingale of Indian Cinema

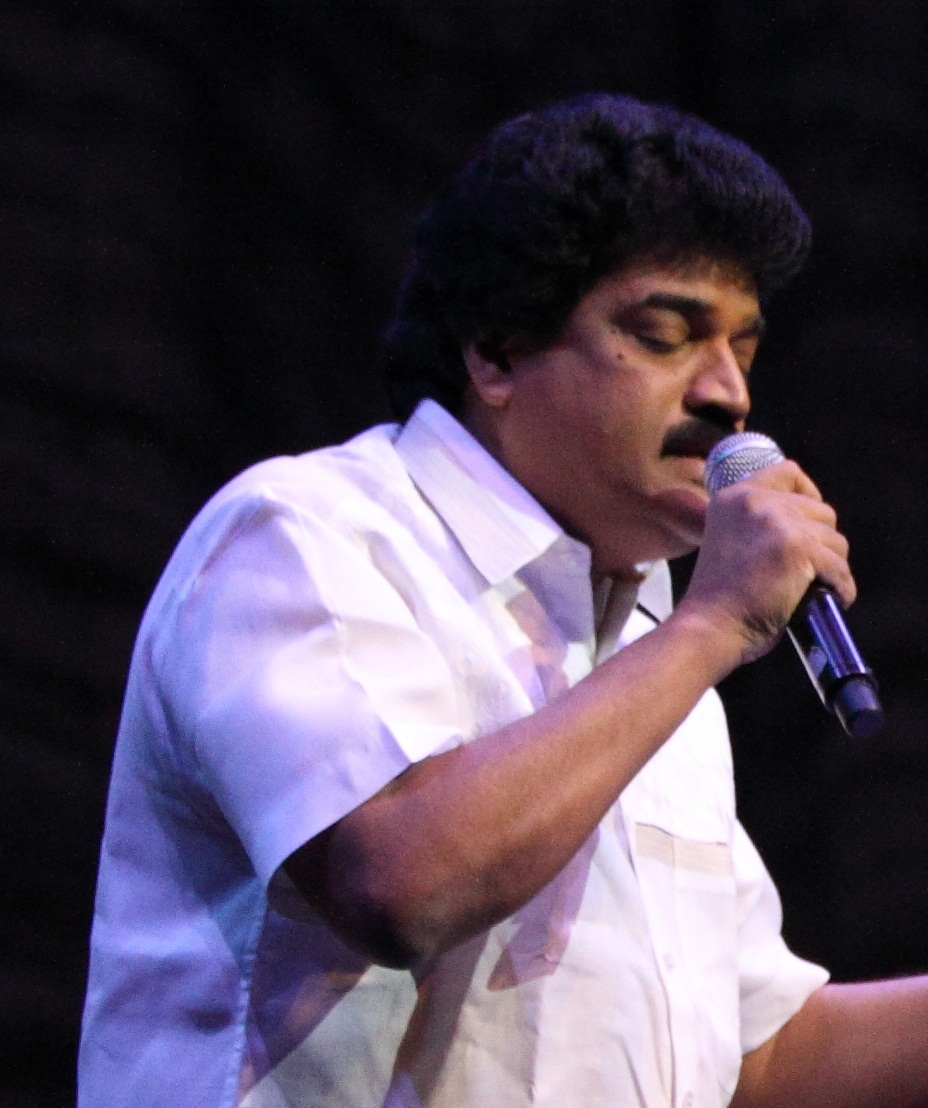
M. G. Sreekumar, Indian playback singer

- M. G. Sreekumar, Indian playback singer and composer
- K. S. Chithra, Indian playback singer
- Sujatha Mohan, Indian playback singer
- Shweta Mohan, Indian playback singer
- M. Jayachandran, Indian composer
- P. Jayachandran, Indian playback singer and actor
- Arjun Menon, Indian playback singer
- Neha Nair, Indian playback singer and composer
- Siddharth Menon, Indian playback singer and actor
- Sreevalsan J. Menon, Indian vocalist

== Journalism ==
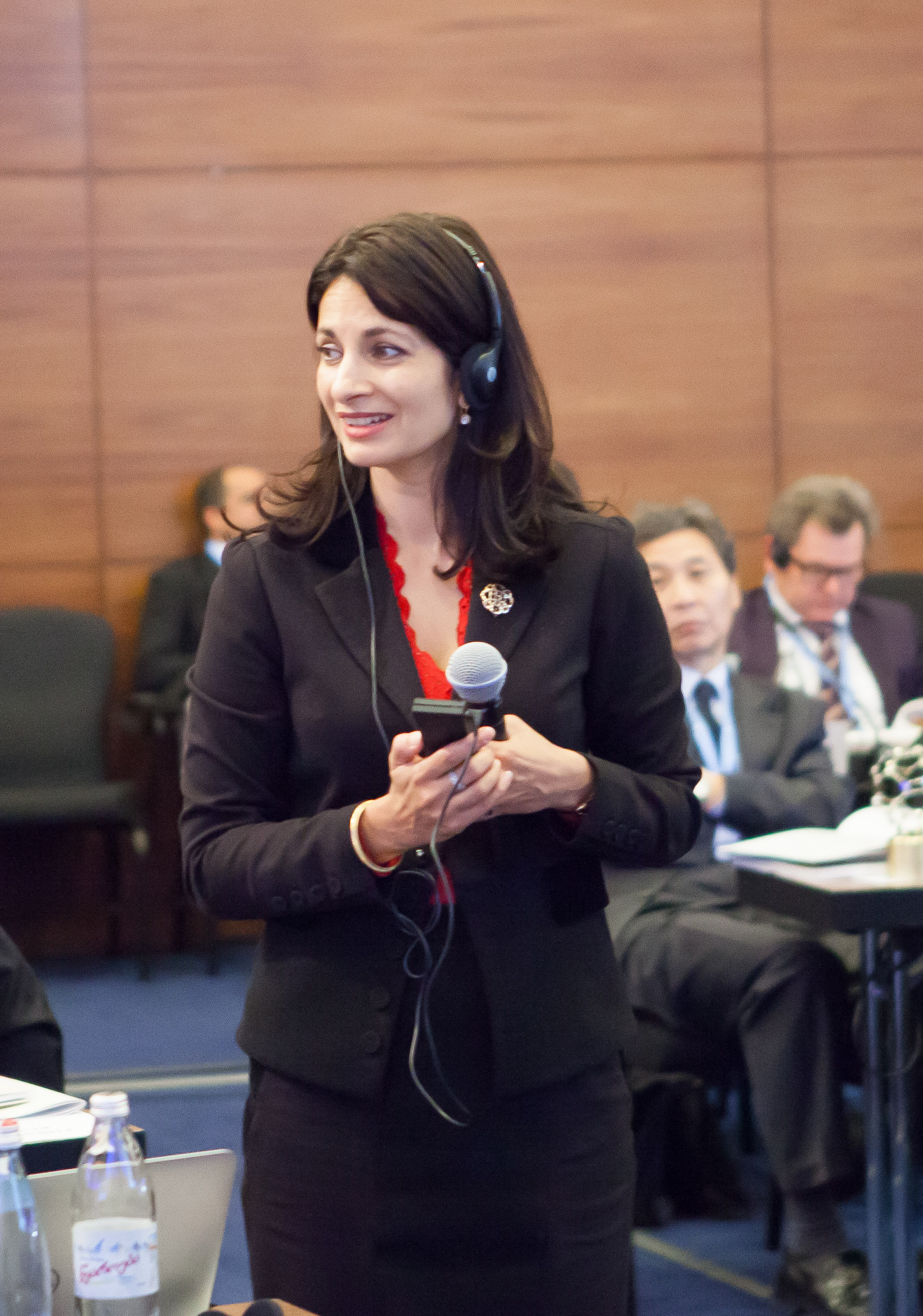
Nisha Pillai, main news anchor for BBC World News

- Sreekandan Nair, media personality, television anchor, veteran journalist and managing director of Flowers TV and 24 News.
- Chelangatt Gopalakrishnan, journalist of Malayalam Cinema.
- Nisha Pillai, Indian journalist based in London
- Udaya Tara Nayar, film journalist in India
- P. Govinda Pillai, former chief editor of Deshabhimani
- K. N. P. Kurup, Indian journalist and politician
- C. Karunakara Menon, Indian journalist and politician
- Kesari Balakrishna Pillai, Indian journalist and writer
- Suresh Menon, sports writer

== Social sciences ==
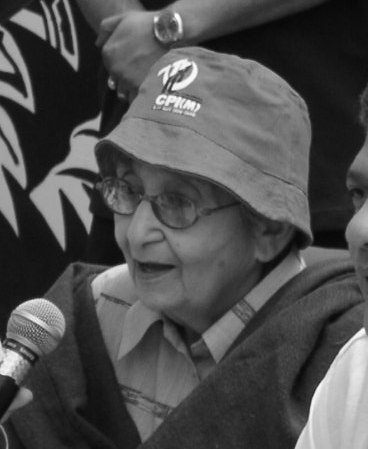
Lakshmi Sahgal, revolutionary of the Indian independence movement

- Lakshmi Sahgal, popularly known as "Captain Lakshmi", was the leader of "Rani of Jhansi Regiment" of Indian National Army
- Kumbalathu Sanku Pillai, social reformer
- N. P. Nayar, freedom fighter
- K. P. Kesava Menon, Founder of Mathrubhumi, a Malayalam Daily
- K. Kelappan, freedom fighter, popularly known as "Kerala Gandhi"
- Mannathu Padmanabha Pillai, an Indian social reformer, freedom fighter, and the founder of the Nair Service Society (NSS)
- K. Chandrasekhara Pillai, social reformer
- Aiyappan Pillai Madhavan Nair, was closely involved with Japan in the Indian independence movement at 1920s-1940s
- Padmanabha Pillai Gopinathan Nair, social reformer and Gandhian.
- A. C. N. Nambiar, Indian Nationalist
- K. P. Karunakara Menon, social reformer
- Panampilly Govinda Menon, freedom fighter
- K. Kumar, one of the earliest socio-political leaders who have brought Gandhi's message and the spirit of the national movement to the erstwhile Travancore State.
- K. B. Menon, social reformer.
- Viji Thampi, social activist and Indian film director.

[[

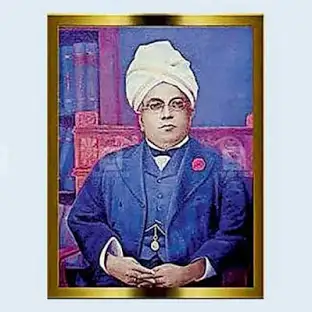
Vengayil Kunhiraman Nayanar

|thumb|Vengayil Kunhiraman Nayanar]]

== Arts and literature ==
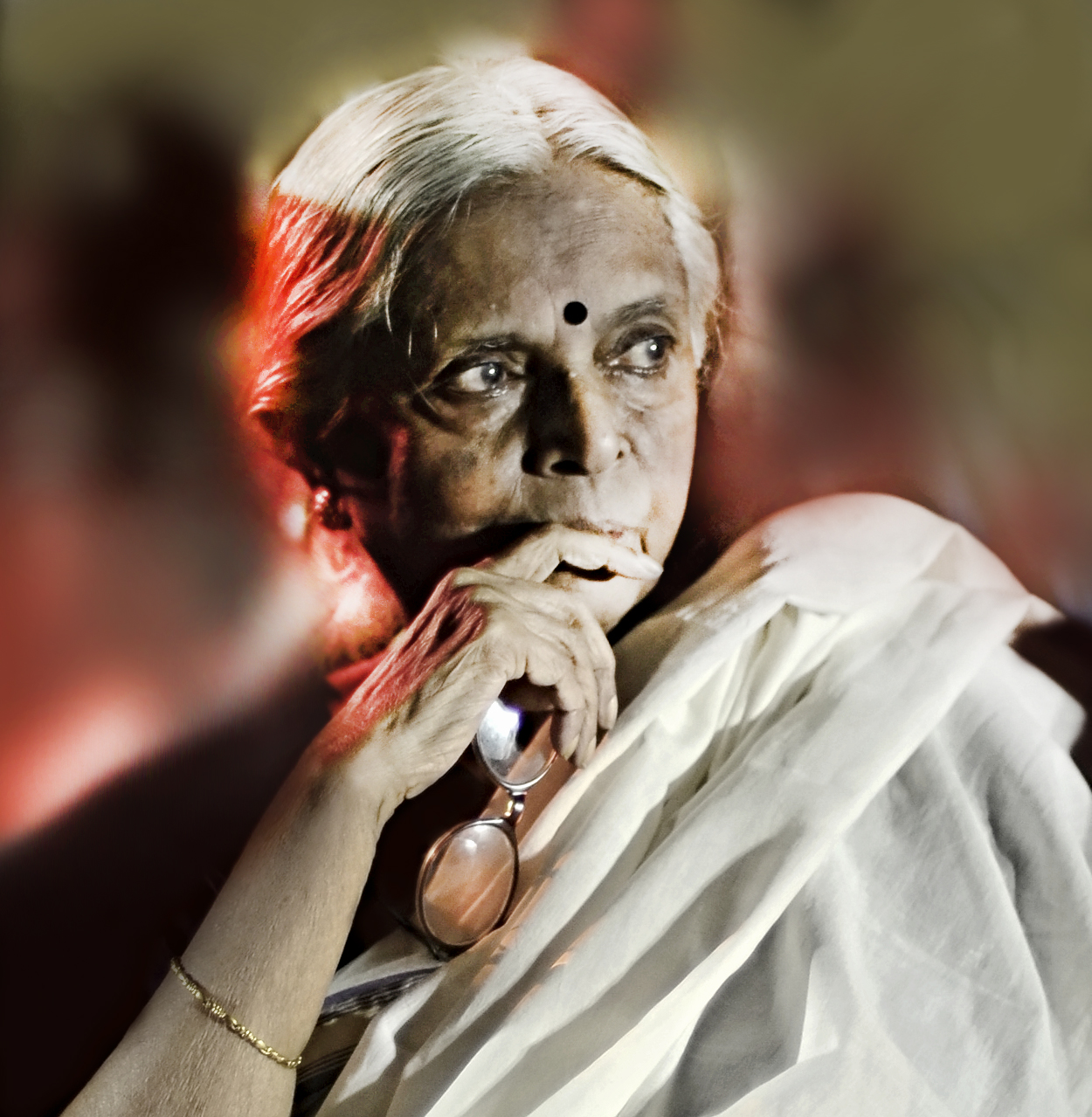
Sugathakumari, famous Indian poet and activist

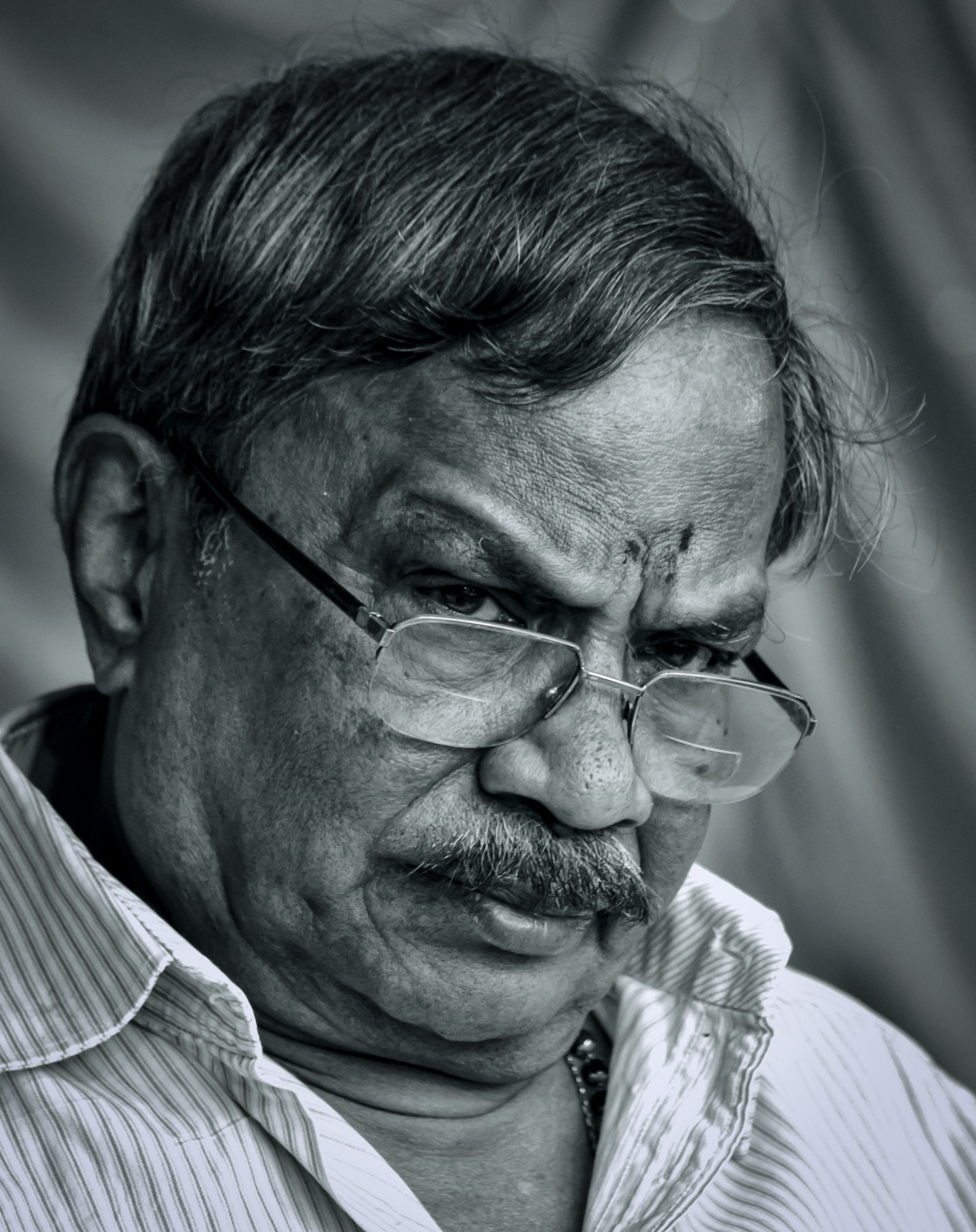
M. T. Vasudevan Nair, prolific and versatile writer in modern Malayalam literature

- Vengayil Kunhiraman Nayanar, Indian journalist essayist and short story writer, wrote the first Malayalam short story Vasanavikrithi
- Sugathakumari, Indian poet and activist
- O. N. V. Kurup, Indian Poet and lyricist
- Elamkulam Kunjan Pillai, Indian historian and linguist
- Azhakathu Padmanabha Kurup, Sanskrit and Malayalam scholar
- Thakazhi Sivasankara Pillai, Indian novelist
- P. Kunhiraman Nair, Indian writer
- M. T. Vasudevan Nair, Indian author, screenplay writer and film director
- Vallathol Narayana Menon, Indian Poet
- N. Krishna Pillai, Indian dramatist and literary critic
- Nalapat Narayana Menon, Indian writer
- Kurissery Gopala Pillai, Indian writer
- Oyyarath Chandu Menon, Indian writer
- Changampuzha Krishna Pillai, Indian writer
- Aiyappan Pillai, Indian writer, politician and lawyer
- Nagavally R. S. Kurup, Indian writer
- S. Guptan Nair, Indian scholar
- Madavoor Vasudevan Nair, kathakali artist
- Oduvil Kunhikrishna Menon, Indian poet
- Kesari Balakrishna Pillai, Malayalam writer, art and literary critic and journalist
- C. N. Sreekantan Nair, Indian writer
- Vadakke kuruppath Narayana Menon, prominent art critics
- K. Kumar, Indian orator, reformer and writer
- P. C. Kuttikrishna Menon, Indian writer
- Omchery N. N. Pillai, Indian Malayalam-language playwright and novelist
- Edasseri Govindan Nair, Indian poet and critic
- Thikkurissy Sukumaran Nair, Indian writer and actor
- M. P. Narayana Pillai, Indian writer
- K. K. Menon, Indian artist
- Ramachandran Unnithan, kathakali artist
- Anita Nair, English-language Indian novelist
- Manu S. Pillai, Indian author and historian
- B. Jeyamohan, Indian author
- Vennikkulam Gopala Kurup, Indian poet
- B. Sujatha Devi, Indian writer
- Edappally Raghavan Pillai, Indian poet
- G. Kumara Pillai, Indian writer
- Karoor Neelakanta Pillai, Indian writer
- Erumeli Parameswaran Pillai, Indian writer
- Sreekanteswaram Padmanabha Pillai, Indian lexicographer
- M. K. Menon, Indian writer
- Asha Menon, Indian writer
- Karthika Naïr, French-Indian poet and dancer

== Bureaucrats and administrators ==
=== India ===
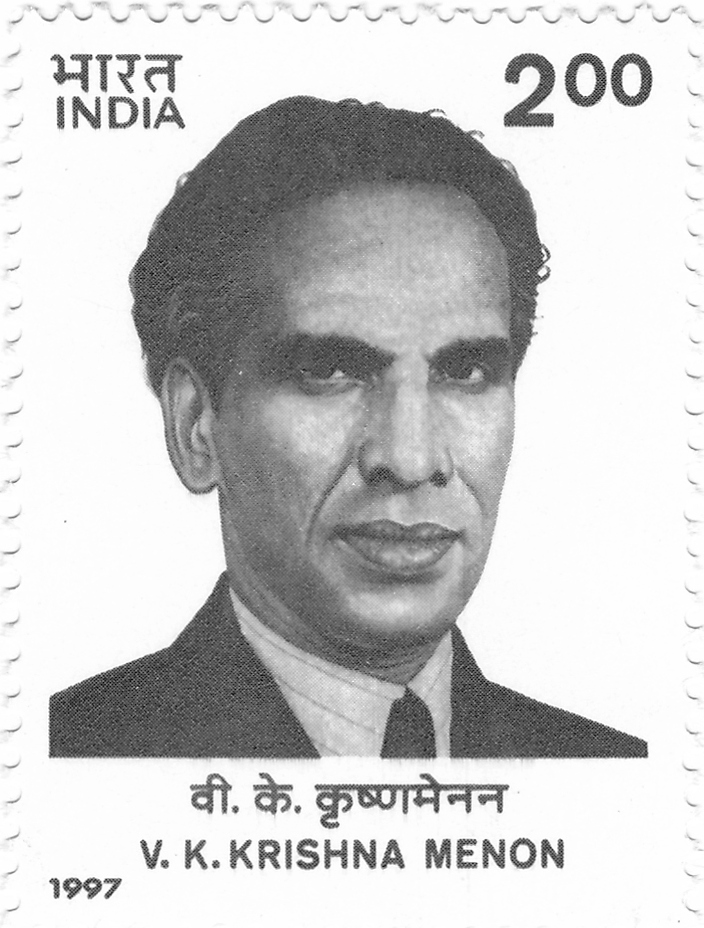
V. K. Krishna Menon, veteran diplomat and Cabinet minister

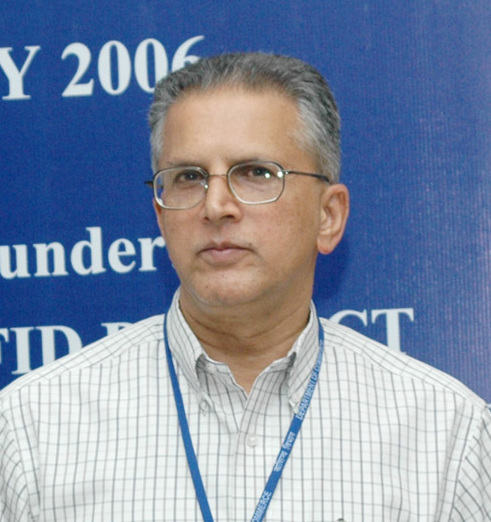
Gopal Krishna Pillai, 15th Home Secretary of India

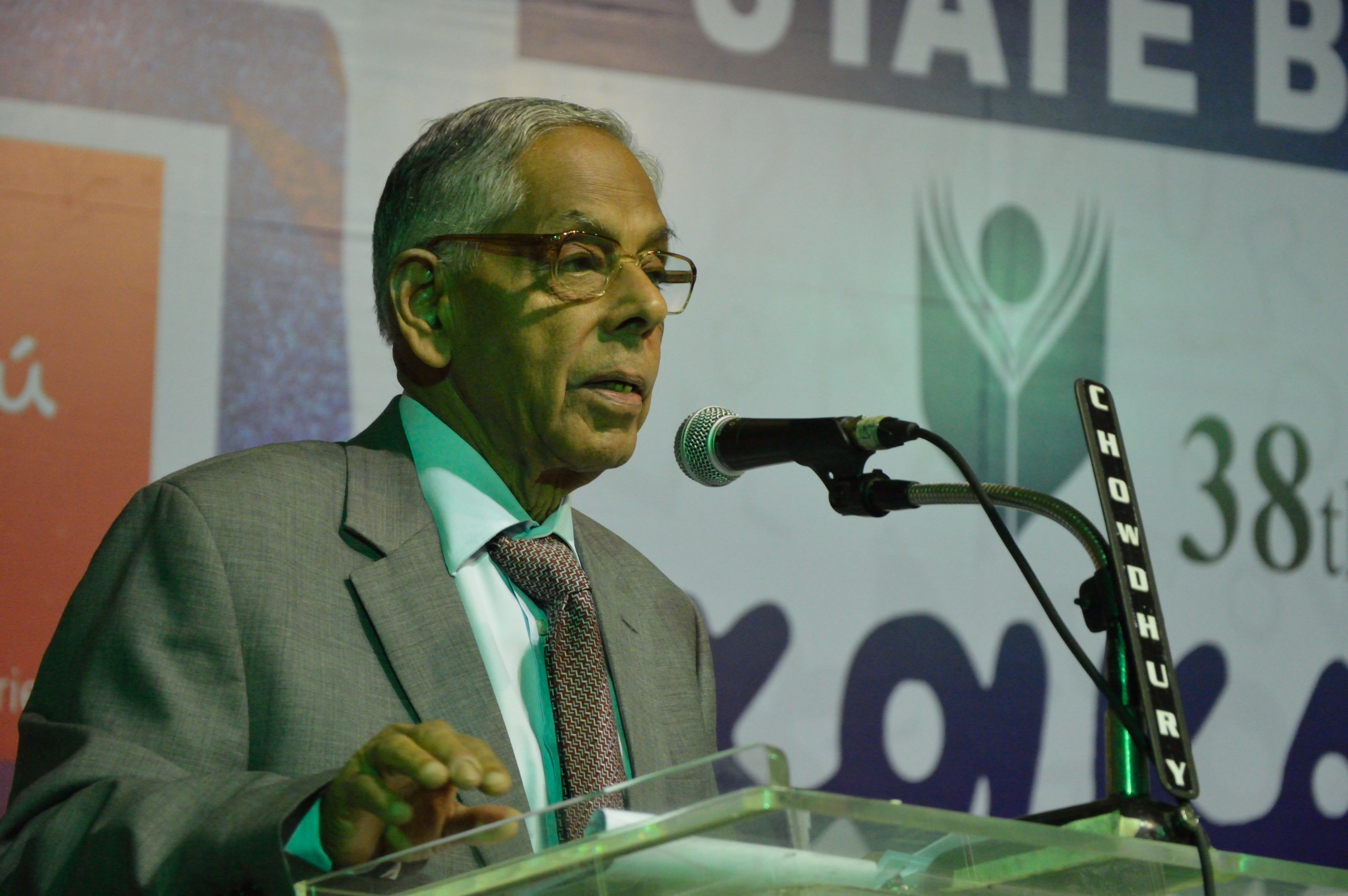
M. K. Narayanan, 3rd National Security Advisor of India and former director of Intelligence Bureau

- V K Krishna Menon, Veteran Diplomat and Cabinet Minister, former Permanent Representative of India to the UN, Indian High Commissioner to the UK.
- V. P. Menon, Constitutional Adviser and Political Reforms Commissioner to the last three viceroys during British rule in India.
- Omana Kunjamma, First Native Female Magistrate in India.
- N. R. Pillai, 1st Cabinet Secretary of India (1950–1953).
- K. P. S. Menon Sr., 1st Foreign Secretary of India (1948–1952).
- M. K. Vellodi, 4th Defence Secretary of India (1953–1957) and the 3rd Cabinet Secretary of India (1957–1958)
- Gopal Krishna Pillai, 15th Home Secretary of India (2009–2011).
- K. P. S. Menon Jr., 15th Foreign Secretary of India (1987–1989).
- Jyotindra Nath Dixit, 18th Foreign Secretary of India (1991–1994) and 2nd National Security Adviser (2004–2005).
- M. K. Narayanan, 3rd National Security Advisor of India (2005–2010) and former Director of Intelligence Bureau.
- Shivshankar Menon, 27th Foreign Secretary of India (2006–2009) and 4th National Security Adviser(2010–2014).
- K. M. Chandrasekhar, 29th Cabinet Secretary of India (2007–2011).
- K. K. Nayar (formerly K. Karunakaran Pillai), former Indian Administrative Service officer of Uttar Pradesh.
- Thottuvelil Krishna Pillai Ayappan Nair, former Indian Administrative Service and adviser to the Prime Minister of India.
- Meppally Keshava Pillai Krishnankutty Nair, Indian Administrative Service officer.
- Ramakrishna Pillai Ramachandran Nair, Indian Administrative Service officer.
- K. Sankaran Nair, 2nd Director of the Research and Analysis Wing
- K Vijayakumar, Former Director General of CRPF. Senior National Security Officer and Advisor to Home Ministry.
- T.P Sreenivasan, diplomat and former Permanent Representative of India to the UN, Indian High Commissioner in Kenya.
- M. P. M. Menon, former ambassador of India to Bahrain, Maldives, United Arab Emirates, and Brazil.
- C. Madhavan Nair, former advocate-general of Madras Presidency.
- P. K. Narayana Panicker, former general secretary and president of NSS.
- Sardar K. M. Panikkar, historian, novelist, and diplomat.
- Vinod C. Menon, Member of the National Disaster Management Authority of India.

=== Outside India ===
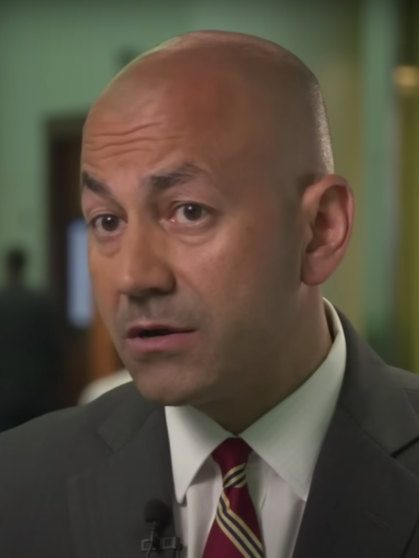
Ranj Pillai, Canadian politician, who has been the tenth premier of Yukon

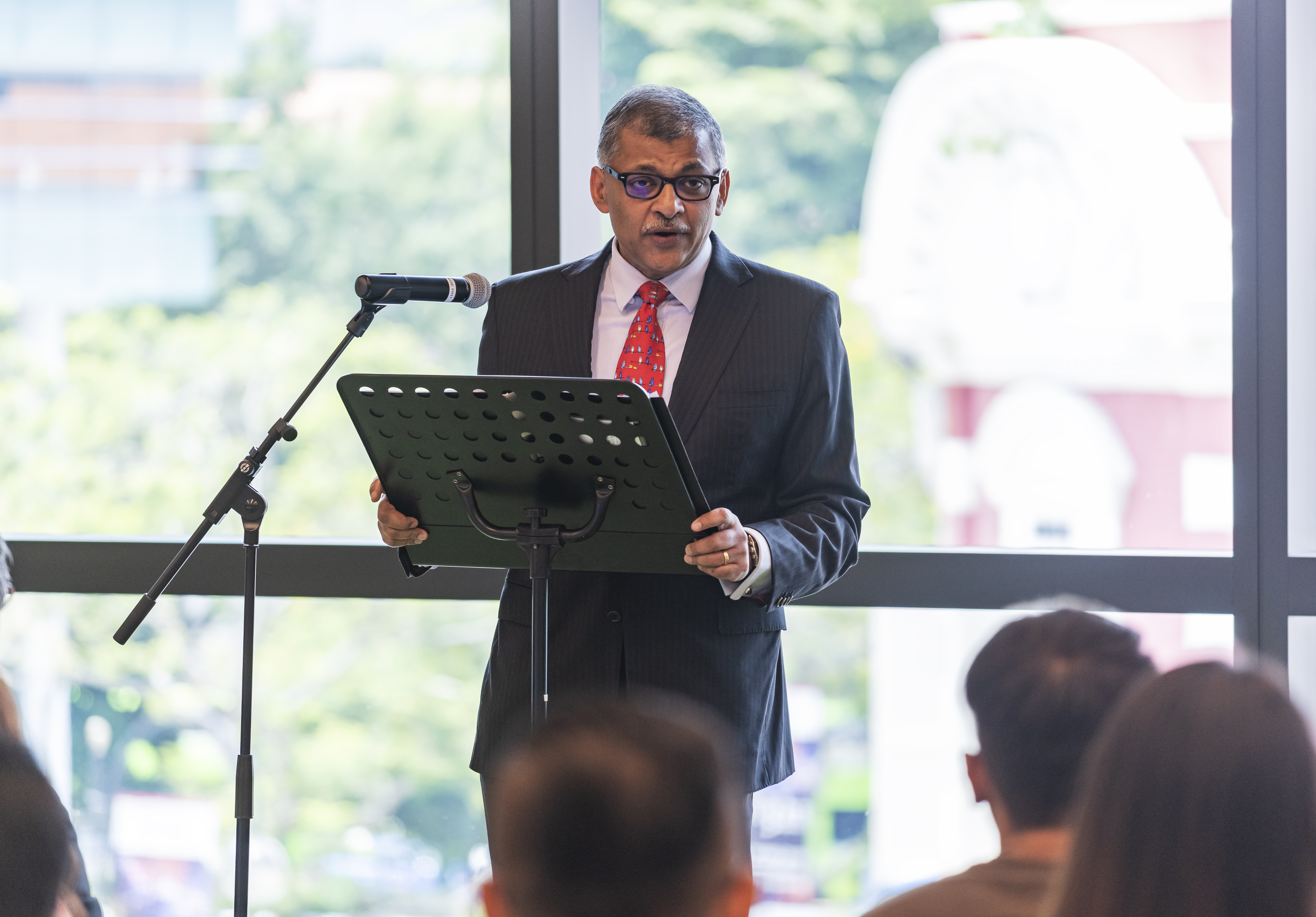
Sundaresh Menon, Chief Justice of Singapore

- Ranj Pillai, Canadian politician, who has been the 10th premier of Yukon and Leader of the Yukon Liberal Party.
- Gopinath Pillai, Singaporean bureaucrat and businessman.
- Sundaresh Menon, 4th and current Chief Justice of Singapore.
- Hri Kumar Nair SC, Singaporean Lawyer serving as the Deputy Attorney-General of Singapore (2017–present). former Member of Parliament representing the Thomson division of Bishan–Toa Payoh GRC (2006–2015).
- Chandran Nair, Singaporean Poet and former Director and Mediator of UNESCO in Paris.
- Gita Gopinath, Current first Deputy managing director of the International Monetary Fund (IMF) (2022–present), previously served as Chief Economist of the IMF (2019–2022).
- Vanu Gopala Menon, Ambassador Extraordinary and Plenipotentiary, personal representative of the President of Singapore.

=== Members of the United Nations ===
- Chandran Nair, civil servant with UNESCO (1981–2004) (Singapore)
- Shashi Tharoor, Under-Secretary-General of the United Nations (2001–2007) (India)
- Vijay K. Nambiar, Under-Secretary-General of the United Nations (2007–2012), Chef de Cabinet of the United Nations, special advisor to the Secretary General of the United Nations (2006) (India),
- Vanu Gopala Menon, the Permanent Representative of Singapore to the United Nations (2004–2011). (Singapore)

== Politicians ==
=== Politicians in India ===
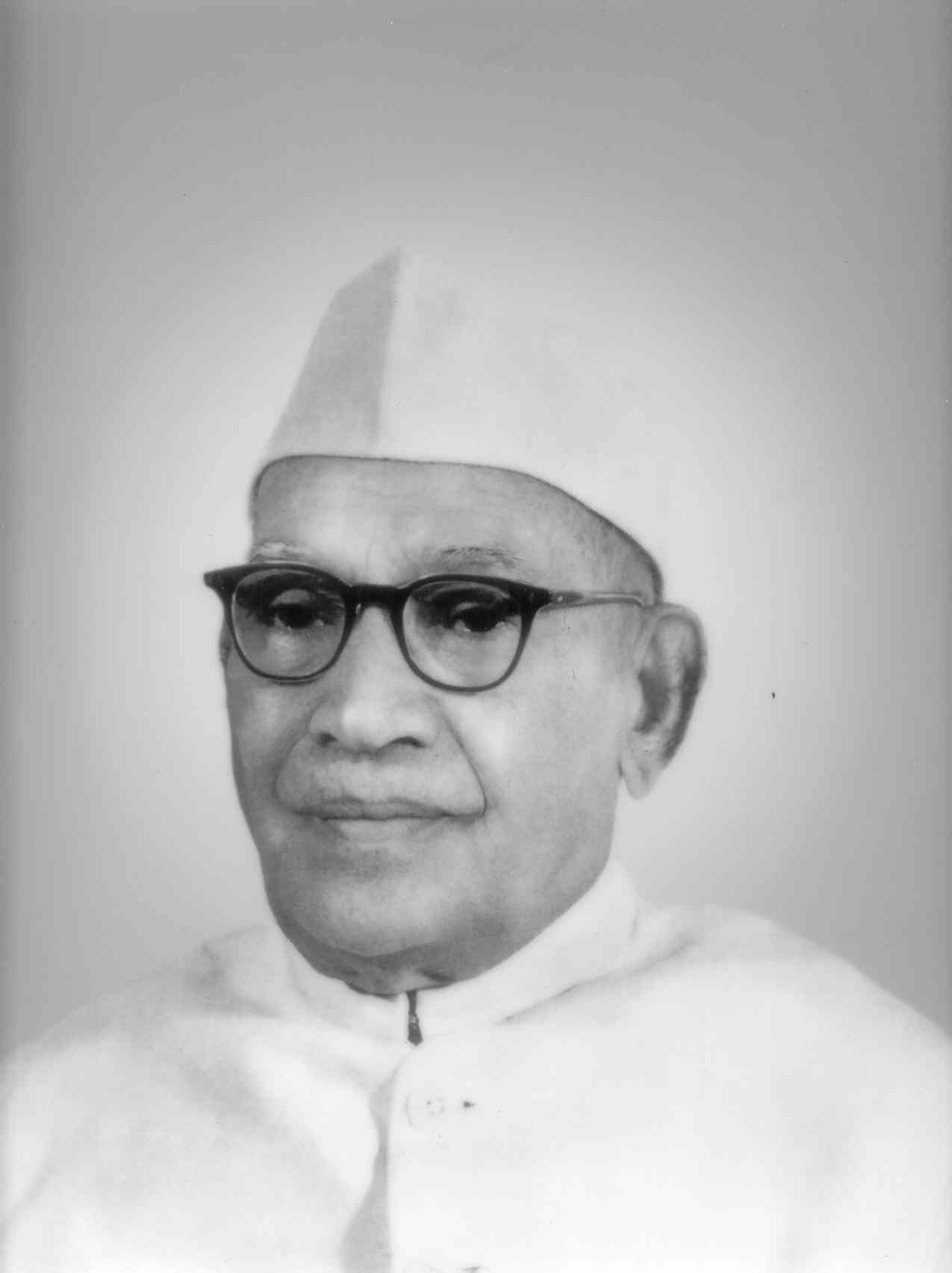
Pattom A. Thanu Pillai, 2nd chief minister of Kerala

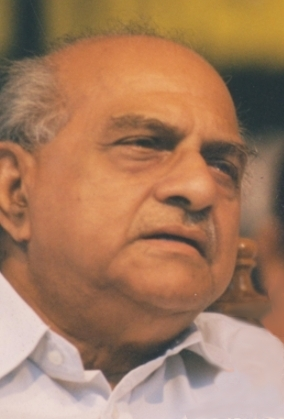
Padayatt Kesava pillai Vasudevan Nair, 7th chief minister of Kerala

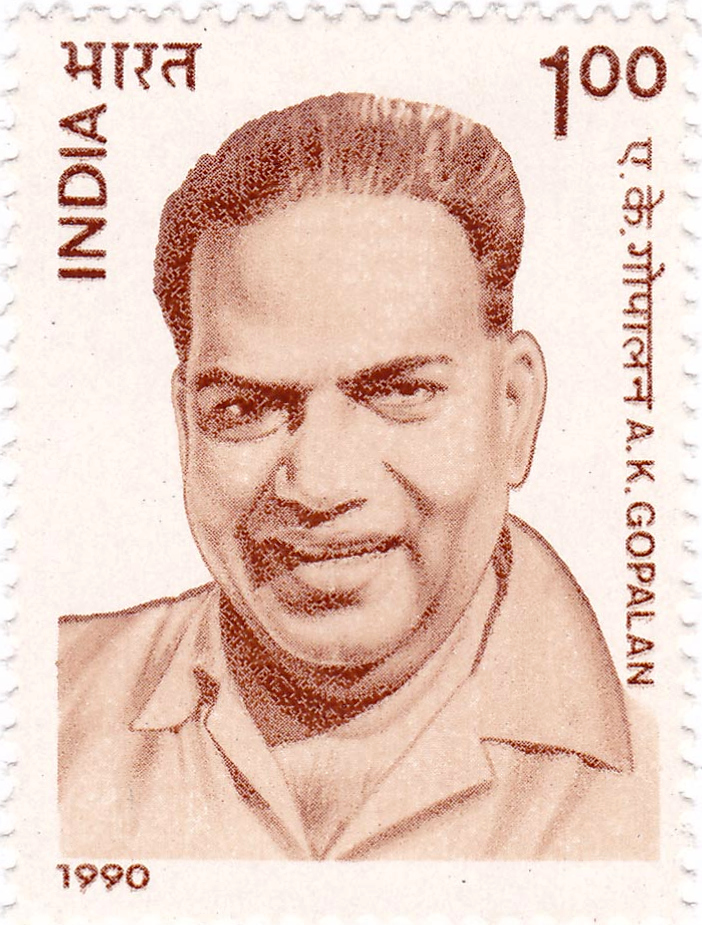
Ayillyath Kuttiari Gopalan Nambiar, Indian politician

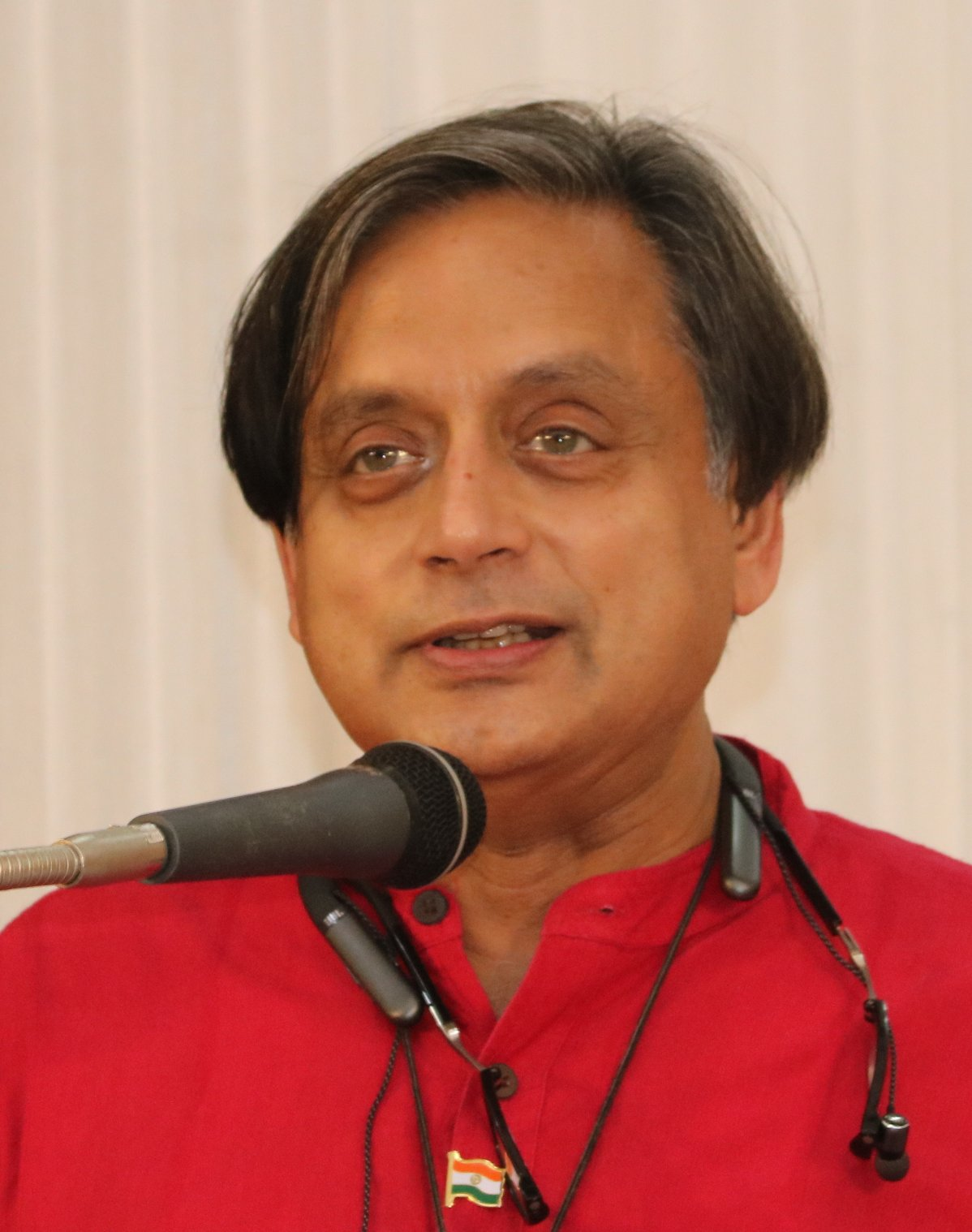
Shashi Tharoor, Indian politician

=== Diwan ===
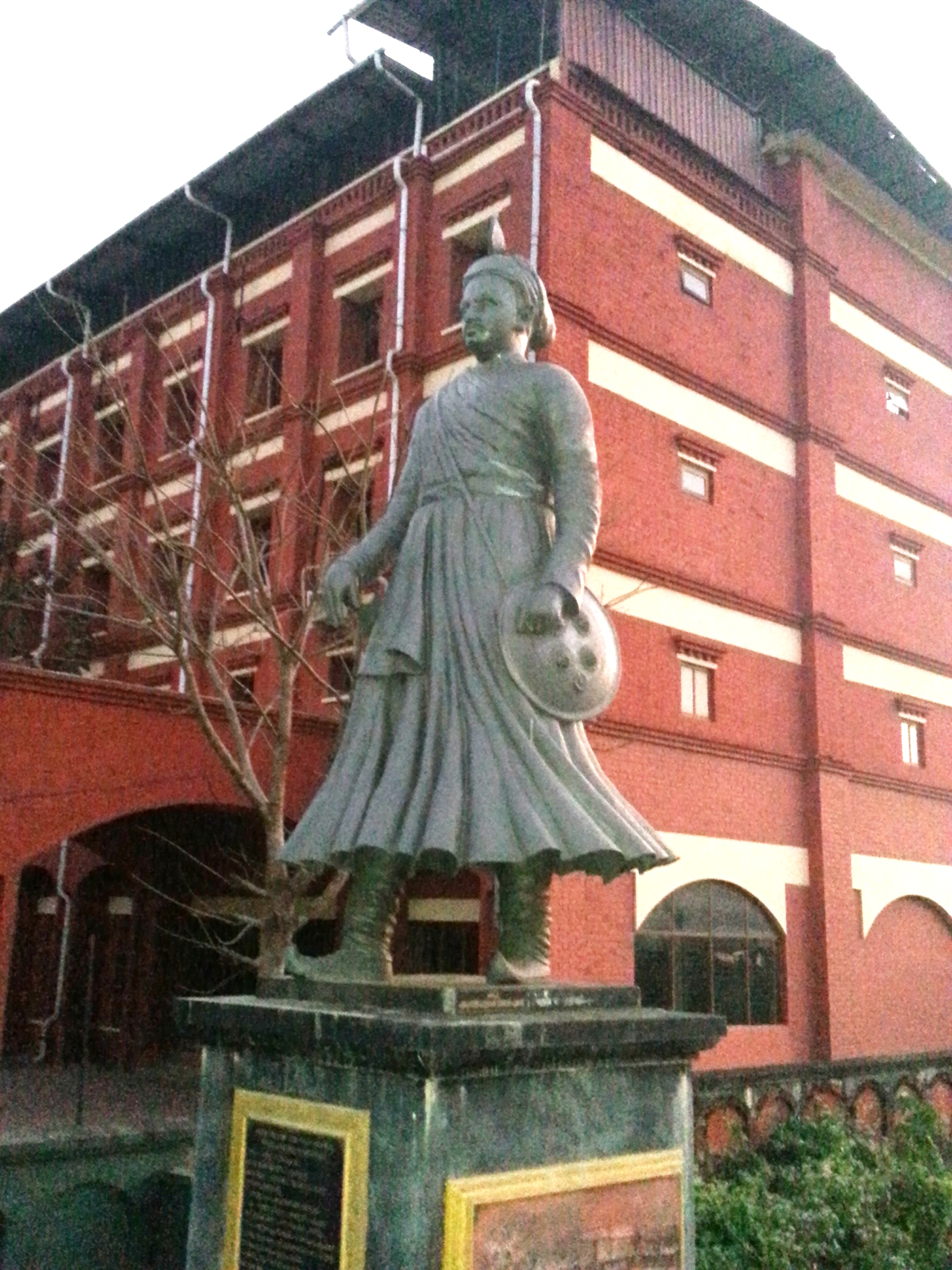
Raja Kesavadas, Statue of Kunnathur Kesavan Raman Pillai (military head of Travancore army)

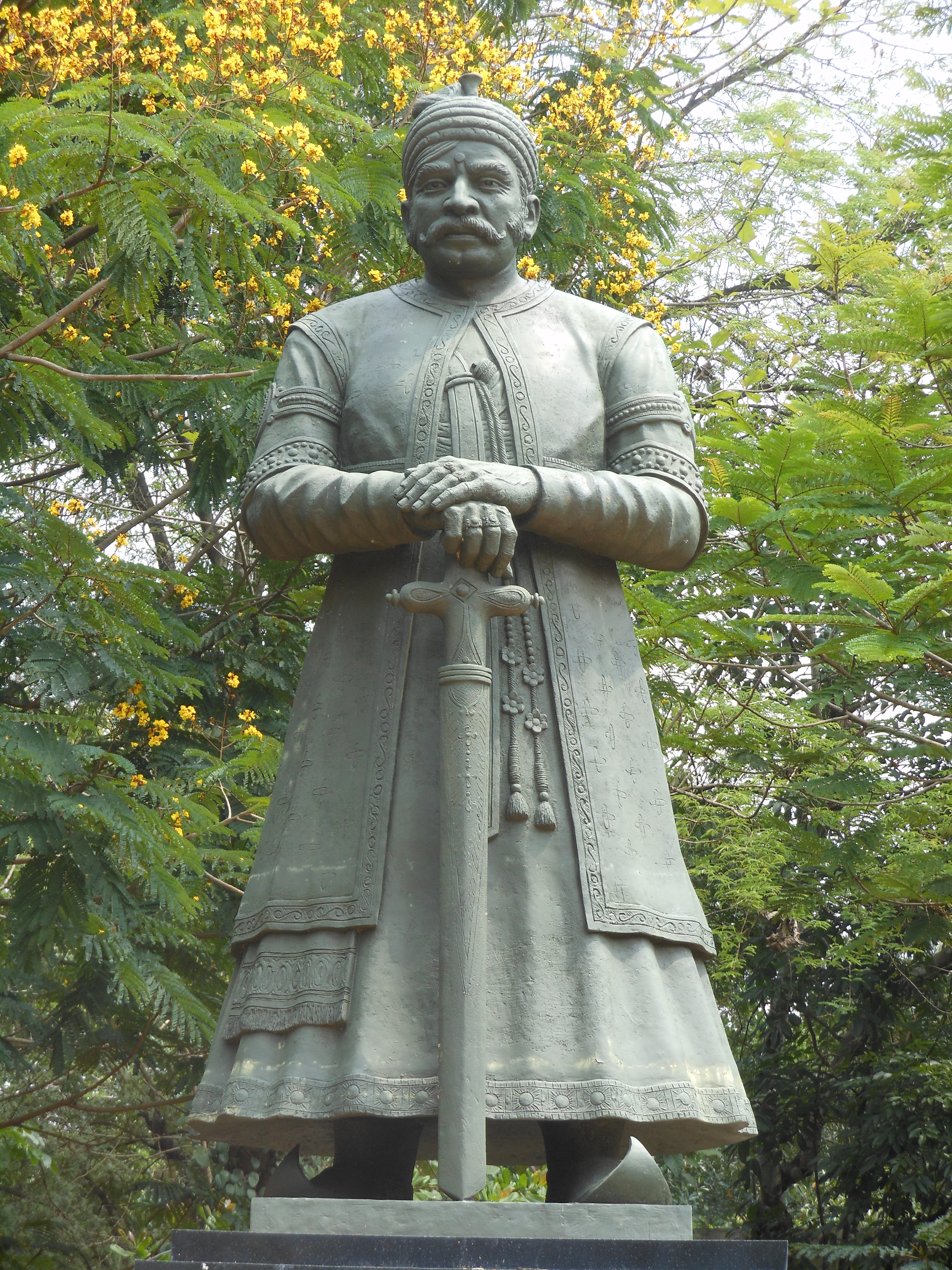
Velu Thampi Dalawa, Statue of Veluthampi (Prime Minister of the kingdom of Travancore between 1802 and 1809)

- Raja Kesavadas, Diwan of Travancore Kingdom (1789–1798). Known as the "Maker of Modern Alleppey".
- Velu Thampi Dalawa, Diwan of Travancore Kingdom (1802–1809) and freedom fighter.
- Nanoo Pillai, Diwan of Travancore Kingdom (1877–1880).
- M. Krishnan Nair, Diwan of Travancore Kingdom (1914–1920)
- P.G.N Unnithan, Diwan of Travancore Kingdom (1947–1948)
- Paliath Achan, former hereditary prime minister of Cochin Kingdom.
- Edamana Sankara Menon, Diwan of Kingdom of Cochin (1830–1834).
- T. Sankunni Menon, Diwan of Kingdom of Cochin (1860–1879).
- T. Govindan Menon, Diwan of Kingdom of Cochin (1879–1890).
- V.S Pillai, Diwan of Kingdom of Cochin (1893–1896).
- P. Narayana Menon, Diwan of Kingdom of Cochin (1922–1925).
- C. P. Karunakara Menon, Diwan of Kingdom of Cochin (1944–1947), Diwan of Pudukottai (1947–1948).

=== United Nations ===
- Shashi Tharoor, former Under-Secretary-General of the United Nations (2001–2007). Current Member of Parliament from Thiruvananthapuram Loksabha Constituency.
- V.K. Krishna Menon, Veteran Indian Diplomat, known for his 8-hour speech at UN Security Council on the Kashmir issue. Known as the 'Hero of Kashmir'. Architect of Non-Aligned Movement.

=== Union ministers ===
- V.K. Krishna Menon, former Union Minister of Defence (1957–1962) (INC)
- Panampilly Govinda Menon, former Union Minister for Railways (1969–1970), Union Minister of Law (1967–1970), 1st Prime Minister of Cochin.
- K. Karunakaran, former Union Minister of Industry (1995–1996) (INC).
- Lakshmi N. Menon, former minister of state, Ministry of External Affairs (1962–1966). (INC)
- M. G. K. Menon, former minister of state for Science and Technology. (1989)
- K P Unnikrishnan, former minister for telecommunications, shipping and surface transport (1989–1990).
- O. Rajagopal, former minister of state in Third Vajpayee ministry.(1999–2004) (BJP)
- Shashi Tharoor, former minister of state in the Second Manmohan Singh ministry (INC)
- K. C. Venugopal, former minister of state for Power, Civil aviation (2011–2014) (INC)
- Rajeev Chandrasekhar, current Minister of State for Skill Development and Entrepreneurship and Electronics and Information Technology (2021–2024) (BJP).
- Suresh Gopi, current Minister of State for Petroleum and Natural Gas, and Tourism (2024–present) (BJP)

=== Prime ministers of Travancore/ Cochin, chief ministers of Travancore-Cochin ===
- Pattom Thanu Pillai, 1st Prime Minister of Travancore and 4th chief minister of Travancore-Cochin.
- Paravur T K Narayana Pillai, 2nd Prime Minister of Travancore, 1st chief minister of Travancore-Cochin.
- T K Nair, 2nd Prime Minister of Cochin.

=== Chief ministers ===
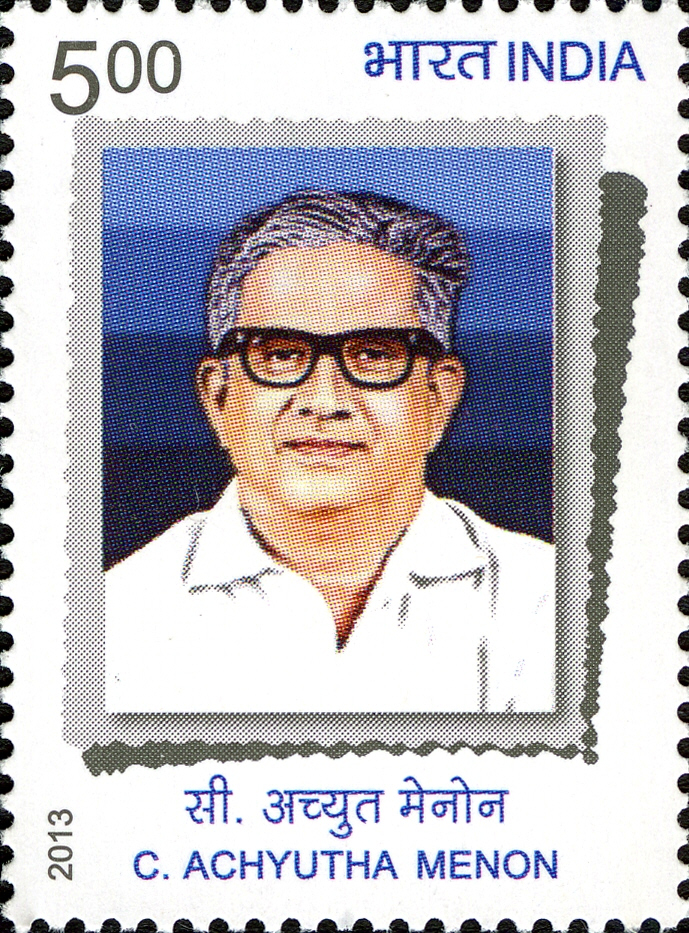
C. Achutha Menon, 4th chief minister of Kerala

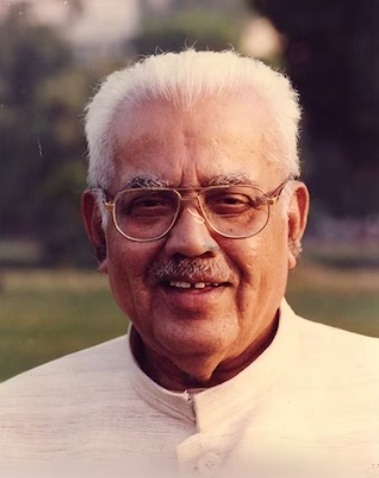
E. K. Nayanar, 9th chief minister of Kerala

- Pattom Thanu Pillai, 2nd chief minister of Kerala (PSP)
- C Achutha Menon, 4th chief minister of Kerala. (CPI)
- P K Vasudevan Nair, 7th chief minister of Kerala. (CPI)
- E K Nayanar, 9th chief minister of Kerala. (CPI(M))
- M G Ramachandran, 3rd chief minister of Tamil Nadu. (AIADMK)

=== Current members of parliament ===
- Rajmohan Unnithan, Member of Parliament from Kasargod Loksabha Constituency.(INC)
- M. K. Raghavan, Member of Parliament from Kozhikode Loksabha Constituency. (INC)
- V. K. Sreekandan, Member of Parliament from Palakkad Loksabha Constituency. (INC)
- Suresh Gopi, Member of Parliament from Thrissur Lok Sabha constituency. (BJP)
- K. C. Venugopal, Member of Parliament from Alappuzha Lok Sabha constituency. (INC)
- N. K. Premachandran, Member of Parliament from Kollam Loksabha Constituency. (RSP)
- Shashi Tharoor, Member of Parliament from Thiruvananthapuram Lok Sabha constituency. (INC)

=== Governors of states ===
- C V Ananda Bose, current governor of West Bengal.
- P S Sreedharan Pillai, current governor of Goa, former Governor of Mizoram. (BJP)
- Kummanam Rajasekharan, former Governor of Mizoram. (BJP)
- M. K. Narayanan, former Governor of West Bengal.
- K. Sankaranarayanan, former Governor of Maharashtra, Jharkhand, Nagaland, Assam and Arunachal Pradesh. (INC)

=== Party leaders ===
- C. Sankaran Nair, 13th president of Indian National Congress (1897).
- A K Gopalan Nambiar, Prominent Communist leader and First Opposition Party Leader of Loksabha. (CPI)
- K. Chandrasekhara Pillai, senior member and former Assistant Secretary of the Communist Party of India (CPI) in Kerala.
- K. G. Marar, former State President of the Bharatiya Janata Party, Kerala.
- Kummanam Rajasekharan, former State President of the Bharatiya Janata Party, Kerala.
- P. S. Sreedharan Pillai, former State President of the Bharatiya Janata Party, Kerala.
- Thennala Balakrishna Pillai, former President of KPCC (1998–2001, 2004–2005).
- Ramesh Chennithala, former President of KPCC (2005–2014).
- E K Nayanar, State Secretary of Communist Party of India (Marxist), Kerala. (1972–1980, 1992–1996)
- Kodiyeri Balakrishnan, State Secretary of Communist Party of India (Marxist), Kerala. (2015–2022)
- K. C. Venugopal, General Secretary of All India Congress Committee. (2019–present)
- V. D. Satheesan, current Opposition leader in Kerala State Assembly (2021–present) (INC)
- N. Jayaraj, current chief whip of LDF in Kerala Legislative Assembly, MLA from Kerala Congress(M). (2021–present)

=== Cabinet ministers (Kerala) ===
Year	Name	Ministry/ portfolio	Party	Chief minister	
1957–1959	C. Achutha Menon	Minister for Finance	Communist Party of India	E. M. S. Namboodiripad	
1957–1959	Dr. A. R. Menon	Minister for Health	Independent	E. M. S. Namboodiripad	
1960–1962	Pattam A. Thanu Pillai	Chief minister	Praja Socialist Party	Pattam A. Thanu Pillai	
1960–1962	K. A. Damodara Menon	Minister for Industries	Indian National Congress	Pattam A. Thanu Pillai	
1962–1964	K. A. Damodara Menon	Minister for Industries	Indian National Congress	R. Sankar	
1967–1969	P. R. Kurup	Minister for Irrigation and co-operation	Praja Socialist Party	R. Sankar	E. M. S. Namboodiripad
1967–1969	M. N. Govindan Nair	Minister for Agriculture and Electricity	Communist Party of India (Marxist)		E. M. S. Namboodiripad
1969–1977	C. Achutha Menon	Chief minister	Communist Party of India	C. Achutha Menon	
1970–1977	M. N. Govindan Nair	Minister for Transport, Electricity and Housing	Communist Party of India	C. Achutha Menon	
1970–1977	K. Karunakaran	Minister for Home Affairs	Indian National Congress	C. Achutha Menon	
1970–1977	R. Balakrishna Pillai	Minister for Transport	Kerala Congress	C. Achutha Menon	
1970–1977	K. Narayana Kurup	Minister for Transport	Kerala Congress	C. Achutha Menon	
1977	K. Karunakaran	Chief minister	Indian National Congress	C. Achutha Menon	K. Karunakaran
1977	K. Sankaranarayanan	Minister for Agriculture	Indian National Congress		K. Karunakaran
1977	K. Narayana Kurup	Minister for Transport	Kerala Congress		K. Karunakaran
1977	P. K. Vasudevan Nair	Minister for Industries	Communist Party of India		K. Karunakaran
1977–1978	K. Sankaranarayanan	Minister for Agriculture	Indian National Congress	A. K. Antony	
1977–1978	K. Narayana Kurup	Minister for Transport	Kerala Congress	A. K. Antony	
1977–1978	P. K. Vasudevan Nair	Minister for Industries	Communist Party of India	A. K. Antony	
1978–1979	P. K. Vasudevan Nair	Chief minister	Communist Party of India	P. K. Vasudevan Nair	
1978–1979	K. Narayana Kurup	Minister for Transport	Kerala Congress	P. K. Vasudevan Nair	
1980–1981	E.K. Nayanar	Chief minister	Communist Party of India (Marxist)	P. K. Vasudevan Nair	E.K. Nayanar
1980–1981	E. Chandrasekharan Nair	Minister for Food, Civil Supplies and Housing	Communist Party of India		E.K. Nayanar
1980–1981	R. Balakrishna Pillai	Minister for Electricity	Kerala Congress (B)		E.K. Nayanar
1982–1987	K. Karunakaran	Chief minister	Indian National Congress	K. Karunakaran	
1982–1987	R. Balakrishna Pillai	Minister for Electricity	Kerala Congress (B)	K. Karunakaran	
1982–1987	Ramesh Chennithala	Minister for Rural Development	Indian National Congress	K. Karunakaran	
1987–1991	E. K. Nayanar	Chief minister, home minister	Communist Party of India (Marxist)	K. Karunakaran	E.K. Nayanar
1987–1991	E. Chandrasekharan Nair	Minister for Food and Civil Supplies	Communist Party of India		E.K. Nayanar
1987–1991	V. V. Raghavan	Minister for Agriculture	Communist Party of India		E.K. Nayanar
1987–1991	K. Sankaranarayana Pillai	Minister for Transport	Indian Congress (Socialist)		E.K. Nayanar
1987–1991	T. Sivadasa Menon	Minister for Electricity and Rural Development	Communist Party of India (Marxist)		E.K. Nayanar
1987–1991	V. Viswanatha Menon	Minister for Finance	Communist Party of India (Marxist)		E.K. Nayanar
1991–1995	K. Karunakaran	Chief minister	Indian National Congress	K. Karunakaran	
1991–1995	R. Balakrishna Pillai	Minister for Transport	Kerala Congress (B)	K. Karunakaran	
1991–1995	M. V. Raghavan	Minister for Co-operation	Communist Marxist Party	K. Karunakaran	
1995–1996	R. Balakrishna Pillai	Minister for Transport	Kerala Congress (B)	K. Karunakaran	A. K. Antony
1995–1996	K. K. Ramachandran Master	Minister For Food And Civil Supplies	Indian National Congress		A. K. Antony
1995–1996	M.V. Raghavan	Minister for Co-operation	Communist Marxist Party		A. K. Antony
1996–2001	E. K. Nayanar	Chief Minister, Home Minister	Communist Party of India (Marxist)	E.K. Nayanar	
1996–2001	T. Sivadasa Menon	Minister for Finance	Communist Party of India (Marxist)	E.K. Nayanar	
1996–2001	V. P. Ramakrishna Pillai	Minister for Irrigation and Labour	Revolutionary Socialist Party	E.K. Nayanar	
1996–2001	E. Chandrasekharan Nair	Minister for Food, Tourism, and Law	Communist Party of India	E.K. Nayanar	
1996–2001	P. R. Kurup	Minister for Forests and Transport	Janata Dal	E.K. Nayanar	
2001–2004	K. Sankaranarayanan	Minister for Finance	Indian National Congress	A. K. Antony	
2001–2004	M. V. Raghavan	Minister for Co-operation	Communist Marxist Party	A. K. Antony	
2001–2004	K. B. Ganesh Kumar	Minister for Transport	Kerala Congress (B)	A. K. Antony	
2004–2006	M. V. Raghavan	Minister for Co-operation	Communist Marxist Party	Oommen Chandy	
2004–2006	Thiruvanchoor Radhakrishnan	Minister for Water Resources	Indian National Congress	Oommen Chandy	
2004–2006	K. C. Venugopal	Minister for Tourism and Devaswom	Indian National Congress	Oommen Chandy	
2004–2006	K K Ramachandran Master	Minister for Health	Indian National Congress	Oommen Chandy	
2006–2011	Kodiyeri Balakrishnan	Minister for Home Affairs and Minister for Tourism	Communist Party of India (Marxist)	V. S. Achuthanandan	
2006–2011	Kadannapalli Ramachandran	Minister for Devaswom	Congress (Secular)	V. S. Achuthanandan	
2006–2011	N. K. Premachandran	Minister for Water Resources	Revolutionary Socialist Party	V. S. Achuthanandan	
2006–2011	P. K. Sreemathy	Minister for Health and Family Welfare	Communist Party of India (Marxist)	V. S. Achuthanandan	
2006–2011	V.Surendran Pillai	Minister for Port & Youth welfare	Loktantrik Janata Dal	V. S. Achuthanandan	
2011–2016	Ramesh Chennithala	Minister of Home Affairs	Indian National Congress	Oommen Chandy	
2011–2016	Thiruvanchoor Radhakrishnan	Minister of Forest, Environment, Sports, Road Transport and Water Transport.	Indian National Congress	Oommen Chandy	
2011–2016	V. S. Sivakumar	Minister of Health and Devaswom	Indian National Congress	Oommen Chandy	
2011–2016	K. P. Mohanan	Minister for Agriculture and Animal Husbandry	Socialist Janata Dal	Oommen Chandy	
2016–2021	E. Chandrasekharan	Minister for Revenue and Housing	Communist Party of India	Pinarayi Vijayan	
2016–2021	E. P. Jayarajan	Minister of Industries, Sports and Youth Affairs	Communist Party of India (Marxist)	Pinarayi Vijayan	
2016–2021	C.Raveendranath	Minister of General Education	Communist Party of India (Marxist)	Pinarayi Vijayan	
2016–2021	Kadannappalli Ramachandran	Minister of Ports, Museum and Archaeology	Congress (Secular)	Pinarayi Vijayan	
2021–present	K. Rajan	Minister for Revenue and Housing	Communist Party of India	Pinarayi Vijayan	
2021–present	G. R. Anil	Minister for Food and Civil Supplies	Communist Party of India	Pinarayi Vijayan	
2021–present	K. N. Balagopal	Minister for Finance	Communist Party of India (Marxist)	Pinarayi Vijayan	
2021–present	M. B. Rajesh	Minister for Local Self Governments, Rural Development and Excise	Communist Party of India (Marxist)	Pinarayi Vijayan	
2021–present	P. Prasad	Minister for Agriculture	Communist Party of India	Pinarayi Vijayan	
2021–present	V. Sivankutty	Minister for General Education and Labour	Communist Party of India (Marxist)	Pinarayi Vijayan	

- C. M. Padmanabhan Nair, Politician from Socialist Party.
- K. K. Nayar, former Member of Parliament from Bahraich (Lok Sabha constituency) in 4th Lok Sabha (Bharatiya Jan Sangh).

=== Outside India ===
- Devan Nair (1923–2005), 3rd President of Singapore (1981–1985).
- Priyanca Radhakrishnan, a New Zealand politician who served as the Minister for the Community and Voluntary Sector (2020–2023).
- Pramila Jaypal, an American politician serving as the U.S. representative from Washington's 7th congressional district (2017–present)(Democratic).
- Susheela Jayapal, an American politician served as the county commissioner for Multnomah County, Oregon.
- Hri Kumar Nair SC, a Singaporean lawyer serving as Judge of Highcourt of Singapore (2023–present), former Deputy Attorney-General of Singapore (2017–2023). former Member of Parliament representing the Thomson division of Bishan–Toa Payoh GRC (2006–2015).
- Vikram Nair, a Singaporean politician and lawyer serving as the Member of Parliament representing the Admiralty division of Sembawang GRC (2011–present).
- Murali Pillai, a Singaporean politician and lawyer serving as the Member of Parliament representing Bukit Batok SMC (2016–present)
- Kesava Pillai Anilkumar, a South African politician serving as the Member of the Eastern Cape Provincial Legislature (2019–present).
- Billy Nair (1929–2008), a South African politician, a former member of the National Assembly of South Africa (1994–2004), an anti-apartheid activist.
- Damodran Nair, a Fijian politician who served as the Member of the Tavua Open Constituency in the House of Representatives of Fiji.

== Military personnel ==
Kunhiraman Palat Candeth, former Indian army officer

- Lt General Kunhiraman Palat Candeth, who played a commanding role in the Liberation of Goa from Portuguese control in 1961, and briefly served as the Military Governor of Goa, Daman and Diu. Param Vishisht Seva Medal and Padmabhushan Awardee.
- Major Sandeep Unnikrishnan, former Indian Army officer who served in the 51 Special Action Group of the National Security Guard on deputation. He was killed in action during the 2008 Mumbai attacks. Ashoka Chakra Awardee.
- Captain Harshan R Nair, Ashoka Chakra Awardee. 2 Para SF. Youngest ever recipient.
- Sushil Kumar Pillai, former Indian Army General.
- D. P. K. Pillay, former Indian Army officer.
- Lt. General Satish Nambiar, former deputy chief of Indian Army, Headed UN Forces in Kosovo.
- Radhika Menon, Indian female Merchant Navy officer.
- Colonel Neelakantan Jayachandran Nair, Ashoka Chakra Awardee.
- R. Hari Kumar, 25th and current Chief of the Naval Staff of India (CNS).
- Lt General Sarath Chand, Vice Chief of Army Staff of Indian Army.
- K Vijayakumar, former Director General of CRPF. Senior National Security Officer and Advisor to Home Ministry.
- Iravikkutti Pillai, commander-in-chief of Venad Kingdom.
- Vaikom Padmanabha Pillai, Military officer of the Kingdom of Travancore. He played an active role in the defeat of Tipu Sultan in Travancore during the second battle in April 1790, and had been credited to have heavily injured a leg of Tipu, leaving him lame on one leg.
- Lakshmi Sahgal, popularly known as "Captain Lakshmi", was the leader of "Rani of Jhansi Regiment" of Indian National Army.

== Business / executives ==
=== India ===
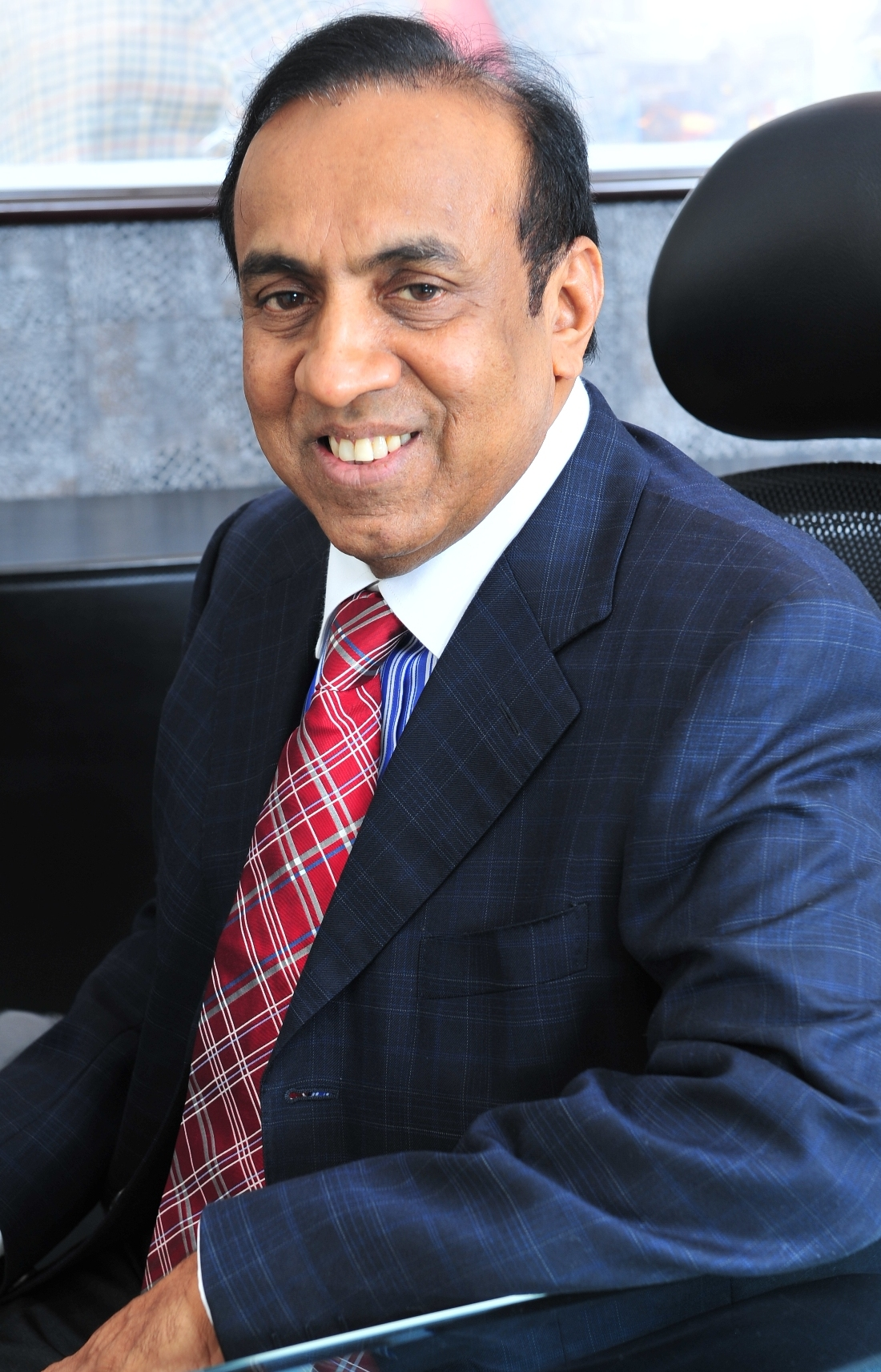
B. Ravi Pillai, Dubai-based Indian billionaire businessman

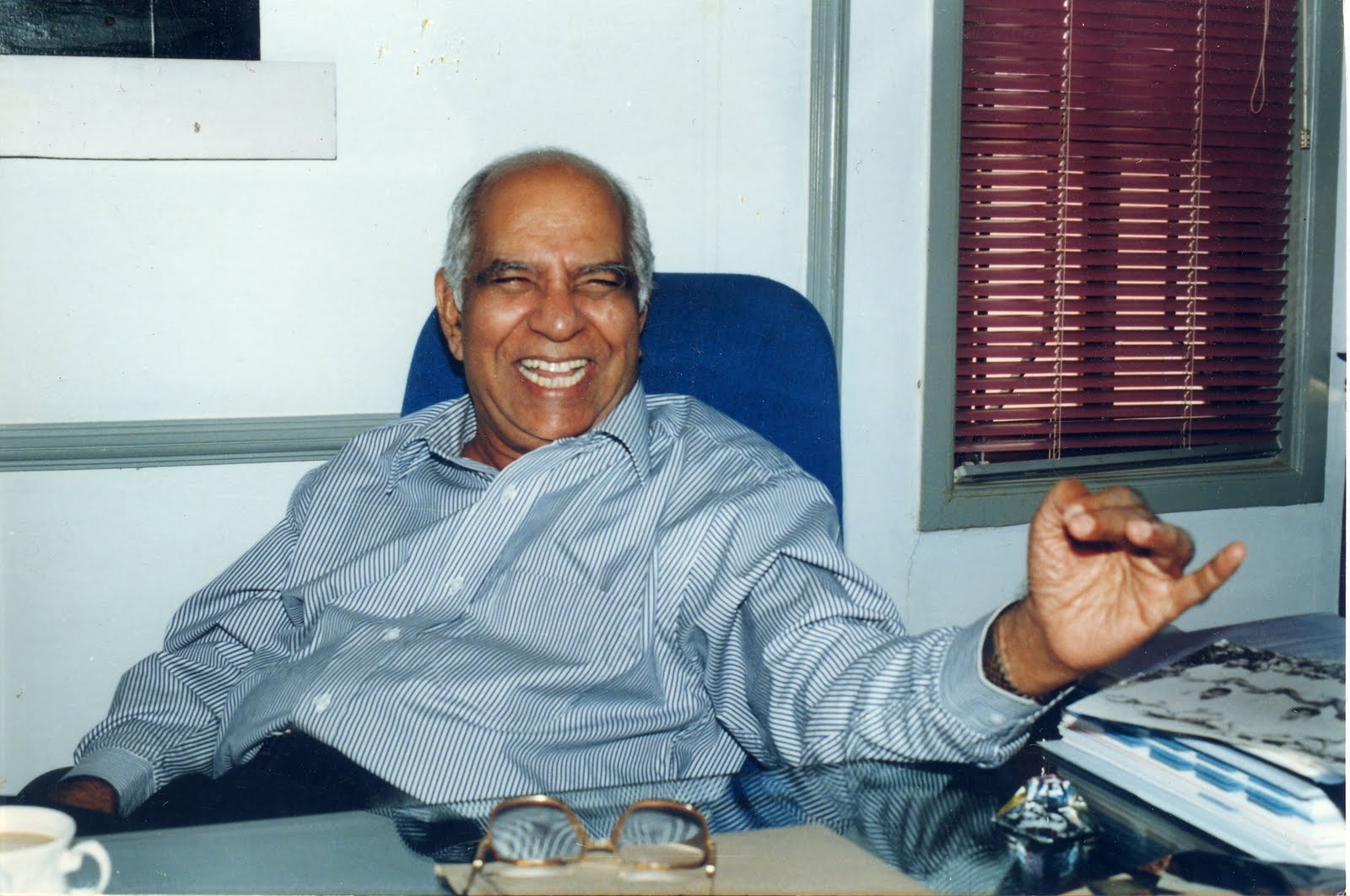
K. P. P. Nambiar, Indian industrialist and technocrat

- B.Ravi Pillai, an Indian billionaire businessman and second richest Keralite
- Nadakkal Parameswaran Pillai, the co-founder of Indian Coffee Houses in Kerala
- K. Ravindranathan Nair, Indian businessman and film producer
- Rajan Pillai, Indian businessman
- K. P. P. Nambiar, Indian industrialist and technocrat
- K. M. Vasudevan Pillai, founder, and CEO of Mahatma Education Society.
- Dr. G. C. Gopala Pillai, former chairman and managing director of Fertilisers and Chemicals Travancore and the Founder MD of Kerala Industrial Infrastructure Development Corporation (KINFRA).
- Rajeev Chandrasekhar, owner of Jupiter Capital, a Bangalore-based venture capital fund; Owner of Asianet News.
- Captain Chittarath Poovakkatt Krishnan Nair, founder of The Leela Group.
- Jaishankar Menon (born 1956), Indian electrical engineer; developer of RAID technology

=== Outside India ===
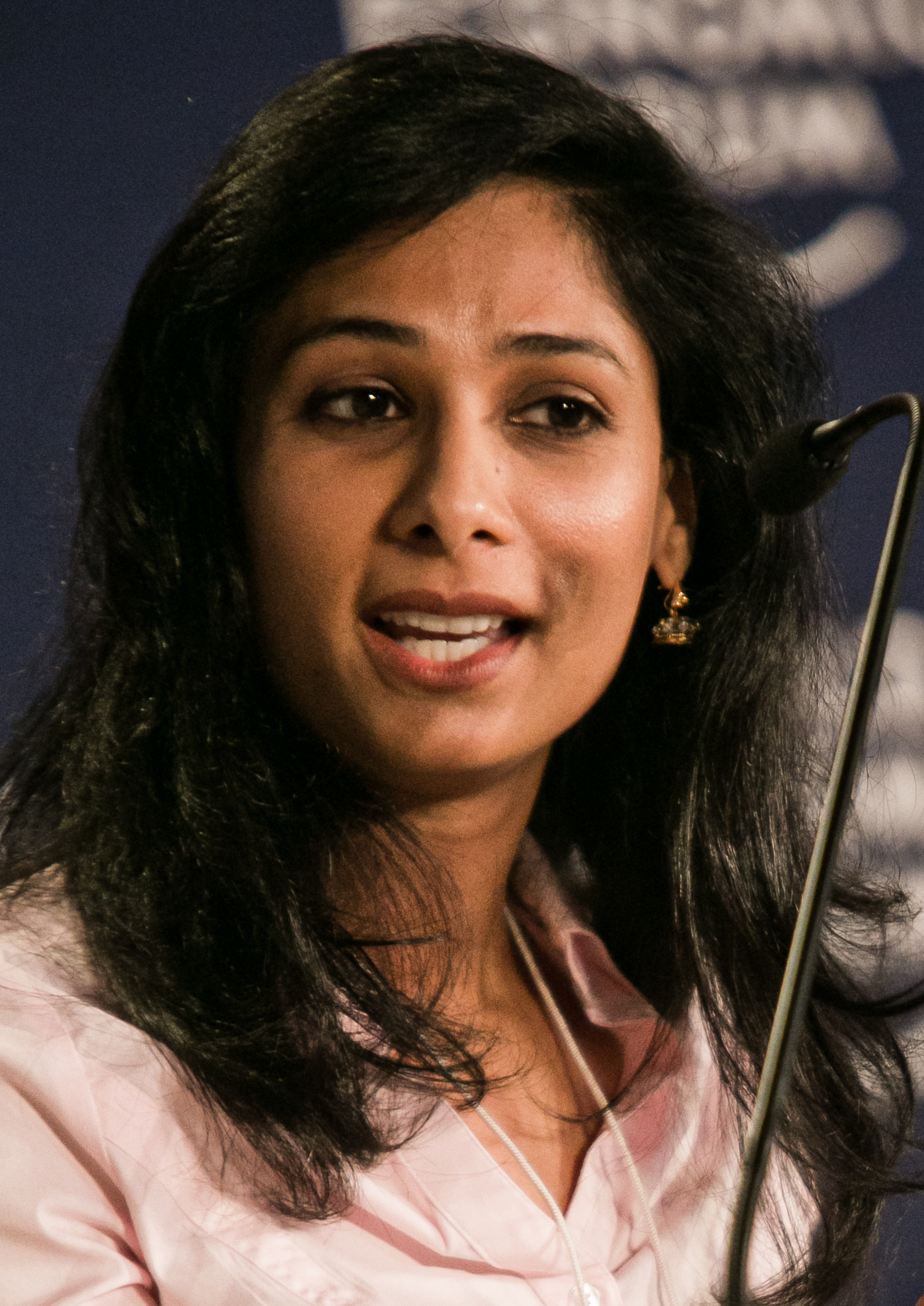
Gita Gopinath, Indian-American economist

- Leena Nair, current global CEO of Chanel. Previously served as the Chief Human Resource Officer of Unilever.
- Gita Gopinath, current first deputy managing director of the International Monetary Fund (IMF) (2022–present), previously served as Chief Economist of the IMF (2019–2022).
- G. A. Menon, founder and chairman of US-based Magnecomp International.
- V.K. Rajashekharan Pillai, a Pravasi Bharatiya Samman Awardee, chairman of Bahrain-based National Group of Companies.
- P. N. C. Menon (born 1948), Indian-Omani businessman

== Academics/ science and technology ==
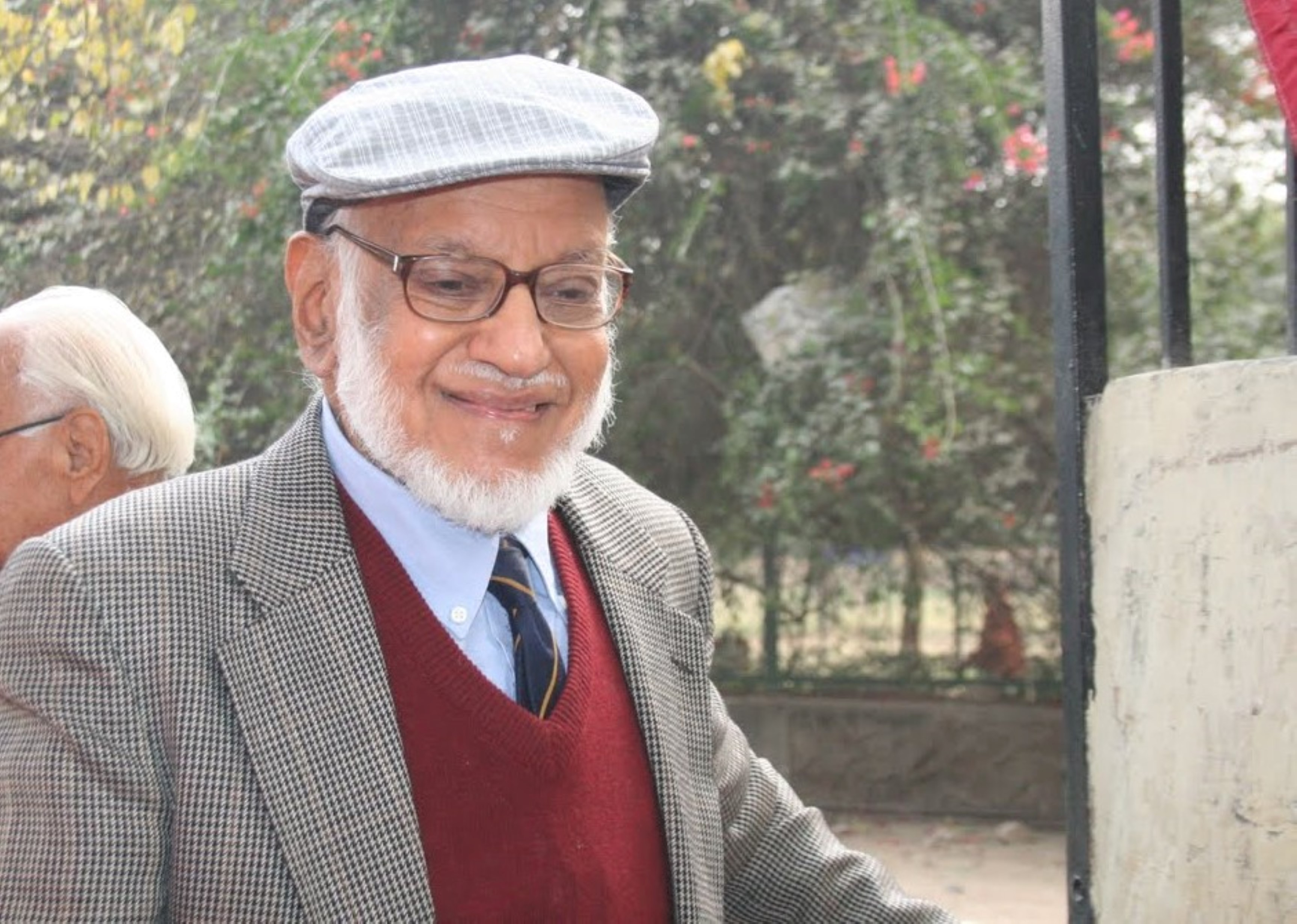
M. G. K. Menon, physicist and policy maker from India

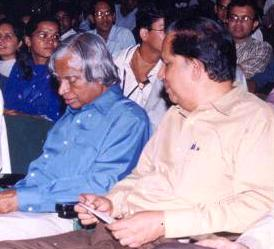
G. Madhavan Nair (right) with APJ Abdul Kalam

- M.G.K Menon, 2nd Chairman of ISRO (1972)
- G Madhavan Nair, 6th Chairman of ISRO (2003–2009)
- K Radhakrishnan, 7th Chairman of ISRO (2009–2014)
- S Somanath, 10th Chairman of ISRO (2022–2025)
- Anil Menon, Candidate for an astronaut at NASA, former medical director at NASA and SpaceX.
- Thushara Pillai, Indian astrophysicist and astronomer.
- M. Radhakrishna Pillai (scientist), Indian cancer biologist.
- K C Sreedharan Pillai (1920–1985), an Indian statistician who was known for his works on multivariate analysis and probability distributions.
- Anand Menon, Professor of European politics and Foreign Affairs at King's College London, UK. Appointed in January 2014 as director of the UK in a Changing Europe initiative. Special adviser to the House of Lords EU committee.
- Nivedita Menon, Feminist writer and Professor of Political Thought at Jawaharlal Nehru University.
- Shree K. Nayar, T. C. Chang Professor of Computer science in the School of Engineering at Columbia University. Director of research at Snap Inc. A Member of the US National Academy of Engineering (2008) and the American Academy of Arts and Sciences (2011).
- Shrikanth Narayanan, Professor at the University of Southern California. An interdisciplinary engineer-scientist with a focus on human-centered signal processing and machine intelligence with speech and spoken language processing at its core.
- V. Parmeswaran Nair, A physicist, currently as serving a Distinguished Professor at City University of New York.
- Geeta Menon, the Abraham Krasnoff Professor of Global Business at New York University Stern School of Business.
- V. N. Rajashekharan Pillai, Acting chairman, University Grants Commission, India.
- Bindu Menon, Indian neurologist, health activist, researcher.
- M. S. Valiathan, Indian cardiac surgeon.
- Rosscote Krishna Pillai, Indian science writer.
- P. K. Ramachandran Nair, agricultural scientist.
- P. K. K. Nair, Indian scientist

== Award winners ==
=== Padma Vibhushan ===
The Padma Vibhushan is India's second highest civilian honour.

1954	V. K. Krishna Menon	Public Affairs	Kerala
1976	K. Shankar Pillai	Arts	Delhi
1985	M. G. K. Menon	Civil Service	Kerala
1998	Lakshmi Sahgal	Public Affairs	Uttar Pradesh
2006	Adoor Gopalakrishnan	Arts	Kerala
2009	G. Madhavan Nair	Science & Engineering	Karnataka
2011	O. N. V. Kurup	Literature & Education	Kerala
2015	Kottayan Katankot Venugopal	Public Affairs	Delhi

=== Padma Bhushan ===
The Padma Bhushan is India's third highest civilian honour.

1954	Vallathol Narayana Menon	Literature & Education	Kerala
1957	Lakshmi Menon	Public Affairs	Kerala
1958	Kumar Padma Siva Shankara Menon	Civil Service	Kerala
1958	Arathil C. Narayanan Nambiar	Civil Service	Kerala
1966	K. P. Kesava Menon	Public Affairs	Kerala
1966	Mannathu Padmanabha Pillai	Social Work	Kerala
1968	G. Sankara Kurup	Literature & Education	Kerala
1968	M. G. K. Menon	Medicine	Delhi
1969	V. K. Narayana Menon	Science & Engineering	Kerala
1971	P. Kalathil Kunju Kurup	Arts	Kerala
1983	K. Sankaran Nair	Civil Service	Kerala
1985	Thakazhi Sivasankara Pillai	Literature & Education	Kerala
1987	Nalapat Balamani Amma	Literature & Education	Kerala
1998	G. Madhavan Nair	Science & Engineering	Kerala
2005	M. T. Vasudevan Nair	Literature & Education	Kerala
2007	Ramankutty Nair	Arts	Kerala
2007	Kavalam Narayana Panicker	Arts	Kerala
2009	A. Sreedhara Menon	Literature & Education	Kerala
2010	Kuzhur Narayana Marar	Arts	Kerala
2011	Madavoor Vasudevan Nair	Arts	Kerala
2014	K. Radhakrishnan	Science & Engineering	Karnataka
2019	Mohanlal	Arts	Kerala
2020	N R Madhava Menon	Public Affairs	Kerala
2021	K S Chithra	Art	Kerala

=== Padma Shri ===
The Padma Shri is India's fourth highest civilian honour.

1954	K. Shankar Pillai	Literature & Education	Delhi
1961	M. G. K. Menon	Science & Engineering	Delhi
1965	Guru Kunchu Kurup	Arts	Kerala
1970	Kalamandalam Krishnan Nair	Arts	Kerala
1971	Vazhenkada Kunchu Nair	Arts	Kerala
1971	Chenganoor Raman Pillai	Arts	Kerala
1973	Thikkurissy Sukumaran Nair	Arts	Kerala
1973	M. K. Krishna Menon	Medicine	Tamil Nadu
1973	N. Kesava Panikkar	Science & Engineering	Tamil Nadu
1984	Adoor Gopalakrishnan	Arts	Kerala
1984	Mavelikara Krishnankutty Nair	Arts	Kerala
1984	N. Balakrishnan Nair	Medicine	Kerala
1984	Sooranad Kunjan Pillai	Literature & Education	Kerala
1990	G. Aravindan	Arts	Kerala
1990	M. R. Kurup	Science & Engineering	Kerala
1991	Bharath Gopi	Arts	Kerala
1991	T. G. K. Menon	Social Work	Madhya Pradesh
1992	M. K. Narayanan	Civil Service	Delhi
1998	O. N. V. Kurup	Literature & Education	Kerala
2002	V. K. Madhavan Kutty	Literature & Education	kerala
2001	Mohanlal	Arts	Kerala
2001	M. Krishnan Nair	Medicine	Kerala
2001	C. G. Krishnadas Nair	Science & Engineering	Karnataka
2003	Narayana Panicker Kochupillai	Medicine	Delhi
2003	N. R. Madhava Menon	Public Affairs	West Bengal
2004	Keezhpadam Kumaran Nair	Arts	Kerala
2004	Ayyappa Paniker	Literature & Education	Kerala
2005	P. N. V. Kurup	Medicine	Delhi
2005	K. S. Chithra	Arts	Kerala
2006	Kavungal Chathunni Panicker	Arts	Kerala
2006	Shobana	Arts	Kerala
2006	Sugathakumari	Literature & Education	Kerala
2007	Balachandra Menon	Arts	Kerala
2008	Vellayani Arjunan	Literature & Education	Kerala
2008	M. Leelavathy	Literature & Education	Kerala
2008	P. K. Narayanan Nambiar	Arts	Kerala
2009	Leela Omchery	Arts	Delhi
2009	Cheril Krishna Menon	Social Work	UAE
2009	Kalamandalam Gopi	Arts	Kerala
2009	Mattannoor Sankarankutty	Arts	Kerala
2010	B. Ravi Pillai	Trade & Industry	Bahrain
2011	Ritu Menon	Literature & Education	Delhi
2011	Peruvanam Kuttan Marar	Arts	Kerala
2011	A. Marthanda Pillai	Medicine	Kerala
2011	G. Shankar	Science & Engineering	Kerala
2012	Gopinath Pillai	Trade & Industry	Singapore
2012	J. Hareendran Nair	Medicine	Kerala
2012	Priyadarshan	Arts	Tamil Nadu
2013	Madhu	Arts	Kerala
2014	M. Subhadra Nair	Medicine	Kerala
2014	Kalamandalam Satyabhama	Arts	Kerala
2016	Sundar Menon	Social Work	UAE
2016	P. Gopinathan Nair	Social Work	Kerala
2017	Meenakshi Amma	Others	Kerala
2017	Chemanchery Kunhiraman Nair	Arts	Kerala
2020	N. Chandrasekharan Nair	Literature & Education	Kerala
2020	Moozhikkal Pankajakshi	Arts	Kerala
2020	Thalappil Pradeep	Science & Engineering	Tamil Nadu
2021	O M Nambiar	Sports	Kerala
2022	Sankaranarayana Menon Chundayil	Sports	Kerala
2022	P Narayana Kurup	Literature and Education	Kerala

== Sports ==
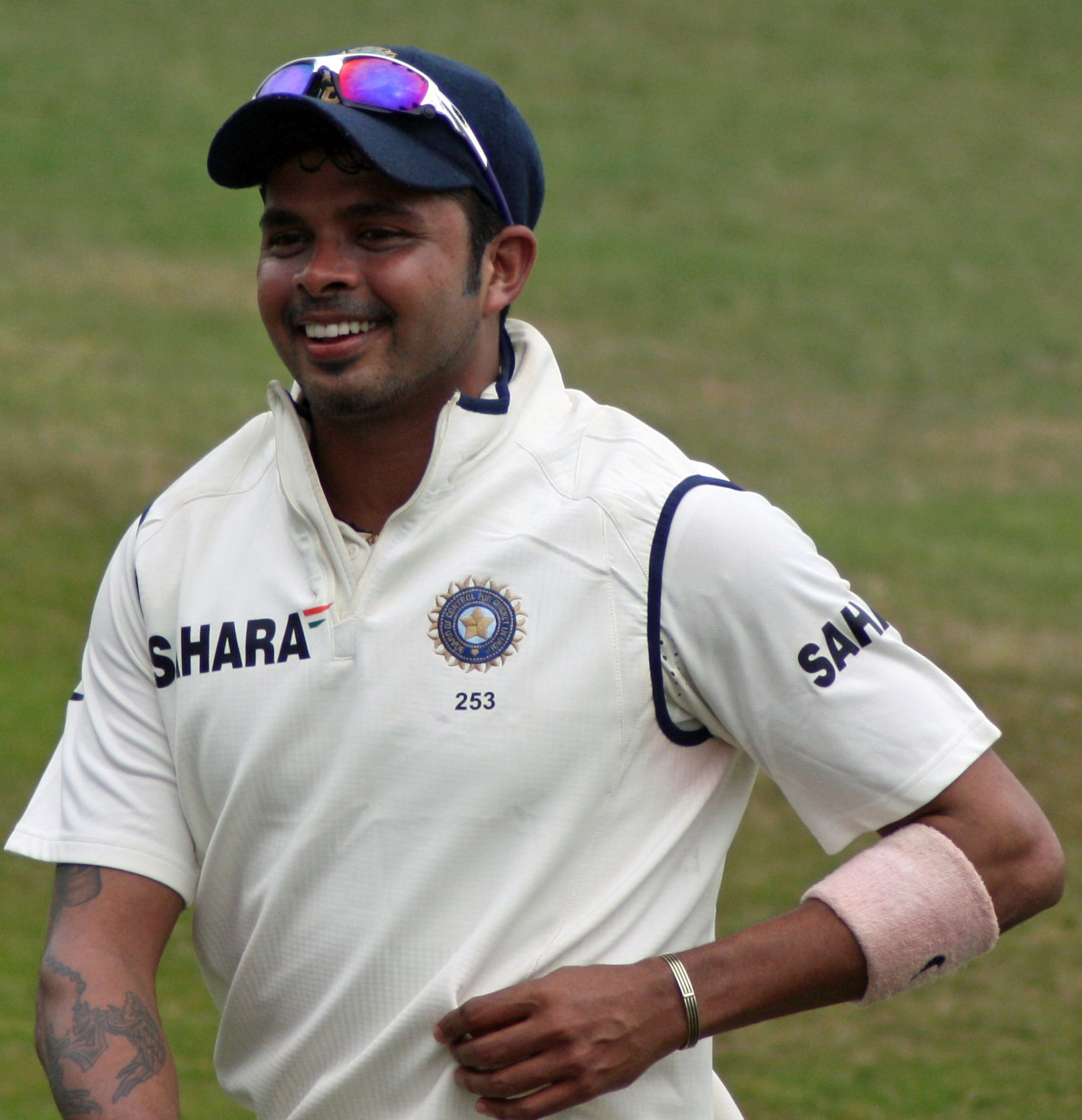
S. Sreesanth, Indian former cricketer Sreesanth in the field for India

- S Sreesanth, Indian former cricketer and film actor
- Karun Nair, Indian international cricketer
- Shankar Pillai, American poker player
- Abhishek Nayar, former Indian international cricketer
- Narendra Menon, former Indian first class cricketer
- Bhaskar Pillai, former Indian cricketer
- Sashi Menon, Indian former professional tennis player
- Arjun Nair, Australian cricketer

== See also ==
- Malayali Pillais
- Kurup of Travancore
- Menon (title)
- Kaimal
- Nair Brigade
- Nair Service Society
