= List of Diwans of Cochin =

The diwans of Cochin assisted the rulers of the Kingdom of Cochin in administering the state. From the 19th century onwards, the diwan or Prime Minister was an administrator selected by the Raja with the advice of the Government of India. Usually, the diwan was a high-ranking official of the Indian Civil Service, covenanted as well as uncovenanted. In Cochin and Travancore, the diwan was also known as Dalavoy.

The following is a list of diwans of Cochin

- 1812–1818 Col. John Munro
- 1818–1825 Nanjappayya
- 1825–1830 Seshagiri Rao
- 1830–1834 Edamana Sankara Menon
- 1834–1840 Venkitasubbaraya
- 1840–1856 T. Sankara Warrier
- 1856–1860 Venkata Rayar
- 1860–1879 T. Sankunni Menon
- 1879–1890 T. Govindan Menon
- 1890–1893 - C. Thiruvenkatacharya.
- 1893–1896 V.S Pillai
- 1899–1901 P. Rajagopalachari
- 1902–1907 N. Pattabhirama Rao
- 1907–1914 A. R. Banerjee
- 1914–1919 J. W. Bhore
- 1919–1922 T. Vijayaraghavacharya
- 1922–1925 P. Narayana Menon
- 1925–1930 P. S. Narayana Iyer
- 1930–1935 C. G. Herbert
- 1935–1941 R. K. Shanmukham Chetty
- 1941–1943 A. F. W. Dixon C.I.E., I.C.S.
- 1943–1944 G. T. Boag
- 1944–1947 C. P. Karunakara Menon
