= Ramachandran Unnithan =

Indian Kathakali exponent

Kalamandalam Ramachandran Unnithan
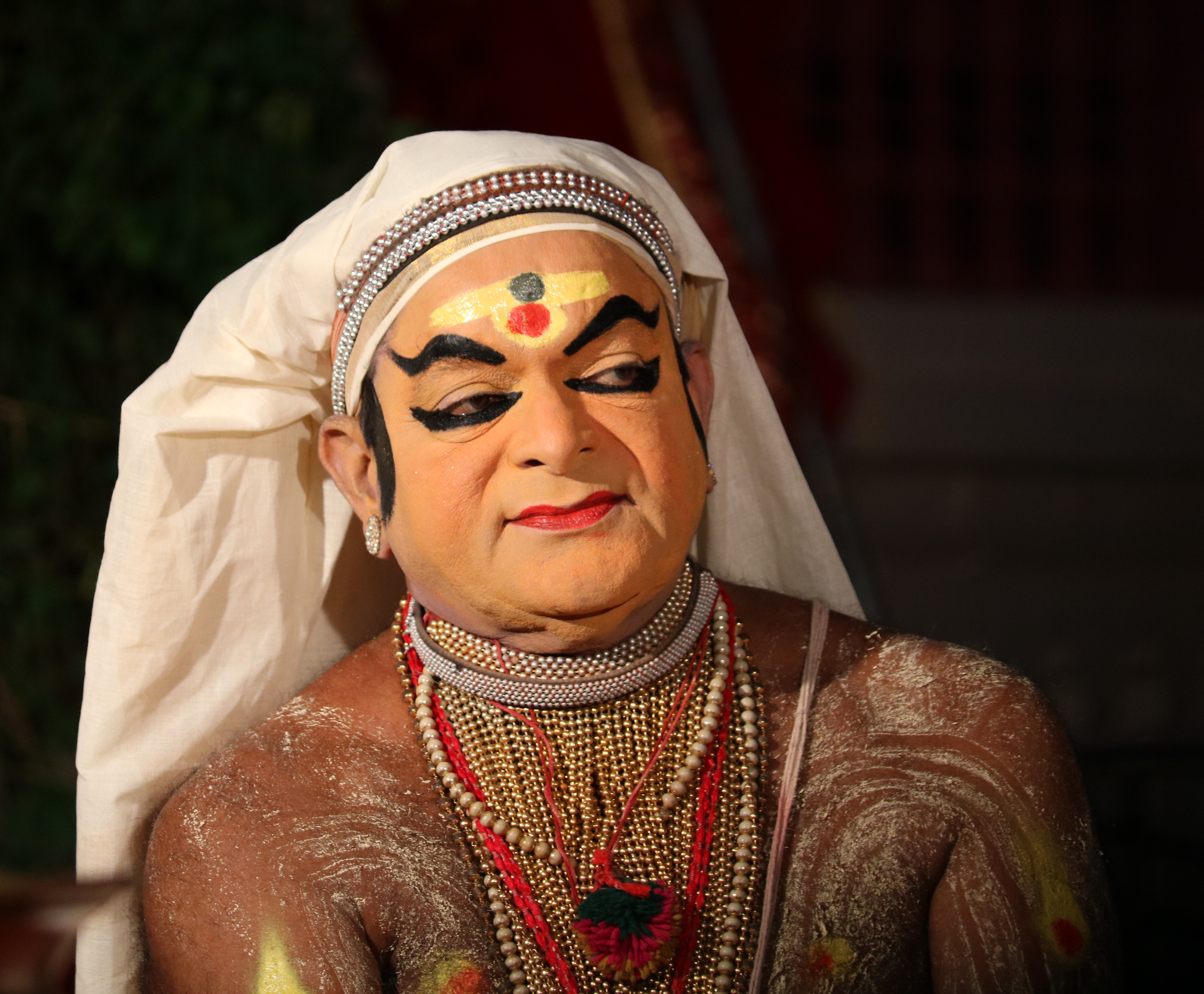
- Unnithan in female kathakali costume
- Born: 8 March 1951 (age 74); Kottarakkara, Kollam district
- Occupation: Kathakali exponent
- Spouse: Leela
- Children: 3
- Parent(s): Vasu Pillai, Gomathiamma
- Awards: Sangeet Natak Akademi Award, Kerala Sangeetha Nataka Akademi Gurupooja award

Kalamandalam Ramachandran Unnithan is a Kathakali exponent from Kerala, India. He received several awards including the Sangeet Natak Akademi Award 2016. His biography titled Kachaiyum Mizhukkum was published in 2015.

== Biography ==
Ramachandran Unnithan was born on 1951 March 8, at Ezhukon Placott House in Kottarakkara, Kollam district, to Vasu Pillai and Gomatiamma. Karithra Vasupillai taught him the basics of Kathakali. He studied Kathakali at Kerala Kalamandalam from 1962 to 1975 and passed the 6 year Diploma and 2 year Post Graduate Diploma. In Kalamandalam Unnithan studied Kathakali under Kalamandalam Ramankutty Nair, Kalamandalam Gopi and Sadanam Krishnan Kutty. He is an exit in the Thadi role in the Kathakali. In his autobiography Unnithan said that one of his mentors, Sadanam Krishnan Kutty, advised him to focus on role of Thadi. His most popular roles are Mannan in Lavanasuravadham (Ramayana) and Bharata Malayan in Nizhal kuth (Mahabharata).

He lives in Vettikattiri in Thrissur district.

== Family ==
He and his wife Sreekumari have three children.

== Awards and honors ==
- Sangeet Natak Akademi Award 2016
- Kerala Sangeetha Nataka Akademi Gurupooja award 2006
- HRD Fellowship
- Pattikkamthodi Ravunni Menon Award
- Kalamandalam Hyderali memorial Kathakali award instituted by the Vendar Subrahmania Swamy temple advisory committee.
- He has won many local awards such as awards from Kollam Kathakali Club, Kottayam Kaliyarang, Alappuzha Kathakali Club, Alappuzha Kalakshetram and Bombay Keli.
