= P. K. K. Nair =

Indian palynologist

Parameswaran Krishnan Kutty Nair (February 6, 1930, in Perunna – January 21, 2017, in Bangalore) was an Indian palynologist, best remembered for his work in plant reproductive biology, and on the triphyletic theory of origin and evolution of angiosperms. He served as the founding director of the Environment Resources Research Centre. He was considered the "Father of Indian Palynology".
