= G. A. Menon =

Indian businessman (1935–2003)

Goplala Achutha "G. A" Menon (1931–2003) was a US-based entrepreneur from Kerala.

== Early life and education ==
Born in North Paravur in Kerala, India, Menon studied at Government Higher Secondary School in North Paravur. He majored in mathematics at Madras University and went to Harvard Business School.

== Career ==
Menon's first job was as a statistician for the Thackersey Mooljee Group, a Mumbai-based company which oversaw textile mills.

Following his graduation, he became a Systems Manager with IBM in India. When IBM closed down in India in 1978, he moved to Singapore where he joined the Chandaria Group. As an employee of Chandaria Group, he set up Multi Tech Systems, which merged with Venture Manufacturing Singapore Ltd in 1989. Menon continued to be the Chairman of Venture Corporation until his death.

After becoming a successful entrepreneur, he returned to Kerala with a proposal to set up a Rs 6,000-crore petrochemical complex at Kasaragod, which was unsuccessful. Subsequently, he set up the two Technopark companies: UST Global and Toonz Animation. Other Indian companies he was involved in were Dexcel Electronic Designs in Bangalore and Customer Line in Kochi.

He was also the founder and chairman of US-based Magnecomp International. The company was a manufacturer of the suspension assembly, a component used in the read/write heads of computer hard disk drives.

== Personal life ==
Menon, his wife, and son moved to Beverly Hills, California, in 1988.

== Death and legacy ==
Menon died in 2003 of cardiac failure while on an airplane flying from Singapore to Los Angeles.

Toonz Animation gives an annual scholarship in Menon's name to young aspiring animators in India.
