= Vinod C. Menon =

Indian UNICEF worker (born 1956)

Prof. Vinod C Menon
- Born: N Vinod Chandra Menon; 10 May 1956 (age 70); Delhi, India
- Education: Jawaharlal Nehru University, New Delhi
- Occupations: Professor; Former Chief of Emergency in UNICEF

Vinod Chandra Menon was formerly the Chief of Emergency in the UNICEF in India and now he joined as Senior Professor and Head of the School of Compassion, Peace, Humanitarian Action and disaster risk management at MIT - World Peace University, Pune.

== Life and career ==
Vinod C Menon is the son of Narayana Menon and writer Bhadra Menon. He resides in Delhi with his wife Shashikala Altekar, and daughter Suvarna Menon and belongs to Kollam, Kerala.

He served as a member of the National Disaster Management Authority (NDMA) from 28 September 2005 – 28 September 2010. As Member, NDMA, he had the status of a Union Minister of State in the Government of India from 2005 to 2010. Prior to that he was in charge of emergency preparedness and response in the UNICEF India Country Office from 2002 to 2005. He was also Professor and Head of the Centre for Disaster Management at the Yeshwantrao Chavan Academy of Development Administration (YASHADA) in Pune, responsible for training senior administrators of the Government of Maharashtra. He is a recipient of the 2010 SKOCH Award for his contributions in the field of disaster management. He has authored several publications and is Co-Editor of Humanitarian Logistics published by Springer in 2010.
