= Rama (disambiguation) =

Rama is the legendary Indian king regarded as an incarnation of Vishnu.

Rama may also refer to:

== Within the scriptures of India ==
- Rama in Jainism
- Rama in Sikhism
- Parashurama (Rama with an axe), a partial incarnation of Vishnu
- Balarama (the strong Rama), brother of Krishna
- another name of Lakshmi

== People ==
=== Kings ===
- Rama (Kings of Thailand)
  - Ram Khamhaeng (1279–1298)
  - Ramathibodi I (1350–1369), Uthong
  - Ramathibodi II (1491–1529), Chettathirat
  - Ramathibodi III, the Great (1656–1688), Narai
  - Rama I, the Great (1782–1809), Buddha Yodfa Chulaloke
  - Rama II of Siam (1809–1824), Buddha Loetla Nabhalai
  - Rama III (1824–1851), Nangklao
  - Rama IV (1851–1868), Mongkut
  - Rama V, the Great (1868–1910), Chulalongkorn
  - Rama VI (1910–1925), Vajiravudh
  - Rama VII (1925–1935), Prajadhipok
  - Rama VIII (1935–1946), Ananda Mahidol
  - Rama IX, the Great (1946–2016), Bhumibol Adulyadej
  - Rama X (2016–present), Vajiralongkorn
- Rulers of Cambodia
  - Barom Reameathibtei (1363–1373), Borommarama
  - Ramathipadi I (1642–1658), Ponhea Chan
  - Barom Ramadhipati (1700–1701/1710–1722), Ang Em
  - Ramathipadi III (1748–1749/1756–1757), Ang Tong
  - Ramathipadi IV (1775–1779), Ang Non
- Rulers of the Hanthawaddy kingdom
  - Binnya Ran I (1424–1446)
  - Binnya Ran II (1492–1526)
- Rulers of the Kingdom of Cochin
  - Rama Varma VIII (1775–1790)
  - Rama Varma IX (1790–1805)
  - Rama Varma X (1805–1809)
  - Rama Varma XI (1828–1837)
  - Rama Varma XII (1837–1844)
  - Rama Varma XIII (1844–1851)
  - Rama Varma XIV (1864–1888)
  - Rama Varma XV (1895–1914)
  - Rama Varma XVI (1915–1932)
  - Rama Varma XVII (1932–1941)
- King of Rama, title used by the Kings of Hungary

=== Other people ===
- Rama family of Cebu, Philippines:
  - Annabelle Rama (born 1952), Filipina actress and talent manager
  - Mike Rama (born 1954), Filipino politician
  - Napoleon Rama (1923–2016), Filipino lawyer, journalist and writer
  - Osmundo Rama (1914–1998), Filipino physician and politician
  - Vicente Rama (1887–1956), Filipino legislator, publisher and writer; father of Napoleon and Osmundo, grandfather of Annabelle and Mike
- Edi Rama (born 1964), Albanian politician and artist
  - Rama Government, the cabinet formed by Rama after he was elected as prime minister
- Ismail Rama (1935–2022), Albanian shooter
- N. T. Rama Rao (1923–1996), Indian film actor, director, producer, and politician
- N. T. Rama Rao Jr. (b. 1983), Indian Telugu film actor
- Rama (actress) (fl. 1990, 2010–present), Indian film actress
- Rama Duwaji (born 1997), American animator, illustrator and ceramist, First Lady-designate of New York City
- Rezart Rama (born 2000), Albanian footballer

=== Historical personalities ===
- Nityananda Rama, the Vaishnava saint
- "The Rama" (1530–1572), Jewish religious teacher Moses Isserles
- Frederick Lenz, a spiritual teacher who used Rama as his teaching name

== Places ==
=== Bosnia and Herzegovina ===
- Rama, Bosnia and Herzegovina, a historical region of Bosnia and Herzegovina
- Rama Lake (Bosnia and Herzegovina), near Prozor

=== Canada ===
- Rama, Ontario, Canada
- Rama, Saskatchewan, Canada

=== Israel and Palestine ===
- Rama, Israel, a town in northern Israel
- Rama, Jenin, a Palestinian village in the Jenin Governorate
- Al-Ram, a town near Jerusalem
- Ramatha (or Rama), a former Roman Catholic titular bishopric in Palestine

=== Other ===
- Rəmə, Azerbaijan
- Rama (Gaul), a town in ancient Gaul
- Rama, Ethiopia
- Rama Lake (Pakistan), a lake near Astore, Pakistan
- Rama River (disambiguation), several rivers
- Rama, Nicaragua, a municipality in the South Caribbean Coast Autonomous Region

== Entertainment ==
- Rama (character), a DC Comics Indian superhero based on the Hindu god
- Ramachandra (film), a 2003 film
- Rendezvous with Rama, the first in a series of books known as the "Rama series" by Arthur C. Clarke and Gentry Lee
  - Rama (video game), a 1997 video game based on the books

== Other uses ==
- Rama (fish), a genus of catfish
- Rama (food), a brand of margarine
- Rama people, in Nicaragua
  - Rama language, spoken by the Rama people
- Rama Records, a record label
- Research Moored Array for African-Asian-Australian Monsoon Analysis and Prediction (RAMA)
- Order of Rama, a Thai military award
- RAMa (Régiment d'Artillerie de Marine), a type of formation in the French Army, such as
  - 1st Marine Artillery Regiment (1st RAMa)
  - 11th Marine Artillery Regiment (11th RAMa)
- a previous name of the interstellar object ʻOumuamua

== See also ==
- Raam (disambiguation)
- Ram (disambiguation)
- Ramachandra (disambiguation)
- Ramchandra (disambiguation)
- Ramah (disambiguation)
- Raman (disambiguation)
- Ramana (disambiguation)
- Ramji (disambiguation)
- Ramu (disambiguation)
- Ramudu (disambiguation)
- Sriram (disambiguation)
- Sri Ramulu (disambiguation)
- Rajaram (disambiguation)
- Ramathibodi (disambiguation)
