= Ramudu =

Ramudu refers to the Hindu god Rama in the Telugu-language. It may also refer to:

- Andala Ramudu (disambiguation)
- Adavi Ramudu (disambiguation)
- Allari Ramudu, a 2002 Indian Telugu-language film
- Donga Ramudu (disambiguation)
- Kaliyuga Ramudu, a 1982 Indian Telugu-language film
- Ramudu Bheemudu, a 1964 Indian Telugu-language film

== See also ==
- Rama (disambiguation)
