= Ramoth =

Ramoth or Remeth may refer to:

- one of several places in ancient Israel:
  - Ramoth-Gilead, a Levite city of refuge
  - Baalath-Beer, also known as Ramoth of the South, a city of the tribe of Simeon
  - Ramoth (Issachar), a Levite city in the tribe of Issachar
- Ramoth (dragon), a fictional dragon in Anne McCaffrey's Dragonriders of Pern books
- Ramoth Chapel, Hirwaun, Rhondda Cynon Taf, Wales
- Ramoth, Virginia an unincorporated community in the US state of Virginia

== See also ==
- Ramah (ancient Israel)
