= Atibadi Jagannath Das Award =

- Award for contributions to Odia literature
- Awarded for: Literary award in Odisha, India
- Sponsored by: Odisha Sahitya Akademi
- First award: 1993
- Final award: 2023

Highlights
- First winner: Radha Mohan Gadanayak (1993)
- Latest winner: Srinibash Udgata (2023)
- Total awarded: 31
- Website: Odisha Sahitya Akademi

Atibadi Jagannath Das Samman is a literary award awarded by Odisha Sahitya Akademi to an Odia language litterateur for lifetime contribution to Odia literature. This is the most respectable honor to any litterateur by the academy. This award is named after 15th century Odia poet Atibadi Jagannath Das who was also known as Atibadi (greatest). Started in 1993, the first award was given to Odia poet Radha Mohan Gadanayak. As of 2020, 28 awards have been awarded.

== List of awardees ==
Name of winner	Year	Ref
Radha Mohan Gadanayak	1993	
Krushnachandra Tripathy	1994	
Natabar Samantaray	1995	
Rajakishore Pattanayak	1996	
Laxmidhara Nayak	1997	
Gouri Kumar Brahma	1998	
Nityananda Mohapatra	1999	
Binod Chandra Nayak	2000	
Basanta Kumari Patnaik	2001	
Achyutananda Pati	2002	
Chintamani Behera	2003	
Manoranjan Das	2004	
Umashankar Panda	2005	
Sudarshan Acharya	2006	
Manoj Das	2007	
Mohapatra Nilamani Sahoo	2008	
Dasharathi Das	2009	
Chandrasekhar Rath	2010	
Gaganendra Nath Dash	2011	
Brajanath Rath	2012	
Dhaneswara Mohapatra	2013	
Shantanu Kumar Acharya	2014	
Madhusudan Pati	2015	
Bibhuti Patnaik	2016	
Rabi Singh	2017	
Ramakanta Rath	2018	
Binapani Mohanty	2019	
Ramachandra Behera	2020	
Pratibha Ray	2021	
Sitakant Mahapatra	2022	
Srinibash Udgata	2023	
