= Ram Chandra =

Ram Chandra is an Indian given name. Notable people with the name include:

- Baba Ram Chandra (died 1950), Indian trade unionist
- Ram Chandra Bharadwaj, Indian politician, president of the Ghadar Party
- Ram Chandra Datta (1851—1899), Indian disciple of Ramakrishna and writer
- Ram Chandra Dome (born 1959), Indian politician of the Communist Party of India (Marxist)
- Ram Chandra Kak (1893–1983), Indian politician, prime minister of Jammu and Kashmir
- Ram Chandra Paswan (1962–2019), Indian politician from Bihar
- Ram Chandra Paudel (born 1944), Nepali politician, third president of Nepal
- Ram Chandra Shukla (1925–2016), Indian painter and art critic
- Ram Chandra Vidyabagish (1786-1845), Indian lexicographer and Sanskrit scholar
- Ram Chandra (cinematographer), Indian cinematographer
- Ram Chandra (snake showman), Australian snake showman

== See also ==
- Ramchandra
- Ramachandra (disambiguation)
