= Shriram =

Shriram is a given name and a surname. Notable people with the name include:

- Shriram Iyer, Indian singer
- Shriram Krishnamurthi, professor of computer science at Brown University
- Shriram Lagoo (1927–2019), Indian film and theatre actor, and ENT Surgeon
- Shriram Pal (born 1960), Indian politician
- Shriram Sharma, Indian author and freedom fighter
- Ajay S. Shriram, chairman and Sr. Managing Director of DCM Shriram Ltd
- M. J. Shriram, Indian singer and actor
- Ram Shriram (born 1956), Indian-American billionaire businessman and philanthropist
- Shriram Sonkar (born 1962), Indian politician

== See also ==
- Shriram Group, Indian conglomerate headquartered in Chennai
- Shriram Bharatiya Kala Kendra (SBKK) is an Indian cultural institution
- Sriram (disambiguation)
- Shrirampur
