= Manoj Das =

Indian author (1934–2021)

- Manoj Kumar Das
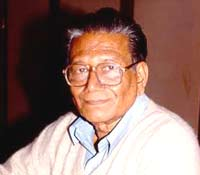
- Born: 27 February 1934; Sankhari, Balasore, Odisha, India
- Died: 27 April 2021 (aged 87); Puducherry
- Education: Samanta Chandra Shekhar College, Puri; Ravenshaw College
- Occupations: Writer, columnist, editor, professor
- Spouse: Pratijina Devi
- Writing career
- Genres: Fiction, mythology, biography
- Notable works: Cyclones; A Tiger at Twilight; Mystery of the Missing Cap; Myths, Legends, Concepts and Literary Antiquities of India
- Notable awards: Padma Shri Padma Bhusan Sahitya Akademi Fellowship; Saraswati Samman
- Website: worldofmanojdas.in

Signature
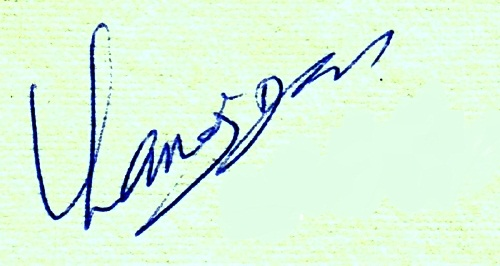

Manoj Das (27 February 1934 – 27 April 2021) was an Indian author who wrote in Odia and English. In 2000, Manoj Das was awarded the Saraswati Samman. He was awarded Padma Shri in 2001, the fourth-highest Civilian Award in India, and Padma Bhusan in 2020, the third-highest Civilian Award in India for his contribution to the field of Literature & Education.

Kendra Sahitya Akademi has bestowed its highest award (also India's highest literary award) i.e Sahitya Akademi Award Fellowship.

In 1971, through extensive research conducted in the archives of London and Edinburgh, he uncovered lesser-known aspects of India's freedom struggle during the early 1900s, led by Sri Aurobindo. This significant contribution earned him the inaugural Sri Aurobindo Puraskar in Kolkata.

His pursuit of deeper understanding eventually led him to mysticism, becoming a resident of [Sri Aurobindo Ashram] in Puducherry in 1963. During his time there, he imparted knowledge in English Literature and the Philosophy of [Sri Aurobindo] at the Sri Aurobindo International University.

== Early life ==
Das was born in the small coastal village, Balasore of odisha. His father, Madhusudan Das, worked under British Government. He had started writing early. His first work a book of poetry in Odia, Satavdira Artanada was published in 1949 when he was in high school. He launched a literary magazine, Diganta in 1950. He graduated high school in 1951. His first collection of short stories Samudrara Kshyudha (Hunger of Sea) was in that year. He was active in student politics while studying BA at Cuttack College. He was a youth leader with radical views in his college days and spent a year in jail for his revolutionary activities. In 1959 he was a delegate to the Afro-Asian students' conference at Bandung, Indonesia. He did not complete his degree in Cuttack. He ultimately finished his graduation from Samanta Chandra Shekhar College, Puri in 1955. During his college years, he kept on writing and published a novel Jeebanara Swada, a collection of short stories Vishakanyar Kahani and a collection of poems Padadhawani. After graduating with a degree in English literature, he got a post-graduate degree in English literature from Ravenshaw College. After a short stint as a lecturer at Christ College (Cuttack), he joined Sri Aurobindo Ashram at Puducherry. Since 1963, he has been professor of English Literature at Sri Aurobindo International Centre of Education, Puducherry.

He cited Fakir Mohan Senapati, Vyasa, and Valmiki as early influences.

== As editor and columnist ==
Das edited a cultural magazine, The Heritage, published from Chennai in 1985-1989. The magazine is no longer in circulation.

He wrote columns on quest for finding eternal truth in common lives in India’s national dailies like The Times of India, The Hindustan Times, The Hindu and The Statesman.

== Creative writing and story-telling ==
Das was a bilingual Odia writer, writing both English and Odia short stories and novels. Das has been compared to Vishnu Sharma, in modern Odia literature for his style Over the years many research scholars have done their doctoral thesis on the works of Manoj Das, P. Raja being the first scholar to do so.

== National and international positions ==
Among the other important positions that Das held were, Member, General Council, Sahitya Akademi, New Delhi 1998–2002, and Author-consultant, Ministry of Education, Government of Singapore, 1983–85. He was the leader of the Indian delegation of writers to China (1999).

== Awards ==
- Odisha Sahitya Academy Award, 1965 and 1987
- Kendra Sahitya Academy Award, 1972
- Sarala Award, 1981
- Vishuba Award, 1986
- Sahitya Bharati Award, 1995
- Saraswati Samman, 2000;
- Orissa State Film Award for Best Story 2001
- Padma Shri, 2001
- Padma Bhushan. 2020
- Sahitya Akademi Fellowship, 2006
- Atibadi Jagannath Das award, 2007
- NTR Literary Award, 2013
- Amrita Keerti Puraskar, 2013
- Veda Vyas Samman
- Mystic Kalinga Literary Award (2020)

== Selected works ==
Novels

- The Escapist, 2001
- Tandralokara Prahari, 2000
- Aakashra Isara, 1997
- Amruta Phala, 1996 (Saraswati Samman)
- A Tiger at Twilight, 1991
- Bulldozers and Fables and Fantasies for Adults, (1990)
- Cyclones, 1987
- Prabhanjana
- Godhulira Bagha
- Kanaka-Upatyakara Kahani
- Amruta phala
- Sesha tantrikara sandhanare

Short Story Collections

- Upakatha Sataka
- Abu Purusha
- Sesa Basantara Chithi, 1966
- Manoj Dasanka Katha O Kahani, 1971
- Dhumabha Diganta O Anyana Kahani, 1971
- The Crocodile's Lady: A Collection of Stories, 1975
- Manoj-pancha-bimsati, 1977
- The Submerged Valley and Other Stories, 1986
- Farewell to a Ghost: Short Stories and a Novelette, 1994
- Legend of the Golden Valley, 1996
- Samudra-kulara Eka Grama (Balya Smruti), 1996
- Aranyaka; (adapted to Aranyaka, 1994)
- Bhinna Manisha O Anyana Kahani
- Abupurusha O Anyana Kahani
- Lakshmira Abhisara
- Abolakara Kahani
- Aranya Ullasha
- Selected Fiction,
- Chasing the Rainbow : growing up in an Indian village, 2004

Travelogue

- Keta Diganta (Part I)
- Keta Diganta (Part -II)
- Antaranga Bharata (Part I) (My Little India)
- Antaranga Bharata (Part II)
- Dura-durantara
- Adura Bidesh – 2004

Poetry

- Tuma Gaan O Anyanya Kabita, 1992
- Kabita Utkala

History & Culture

- Bharatara Aitihya: Shateka Prashnara Uttara, 1999
- Manoj Das Paribesita Upakatha Shataka (Tales Told by Mystics), 2002
- Mahakalara Prahelika O Anyana Jijnansa, 2006
- Jibana Jijnasa o Smaraika Stabaka
- Prajna Pradeepika

== Commentary ==
Graham Greene once said, "I have read the stories of Manoj Das with great pleasure. He will certainly take a place on my shelves besides the stories of Narayan. I imagine Odisha is far from Malgudi, but there is the same quality in his stories with perhaps an added mystery."

== See also ==
- List of Indian writers
