= Jarmuth =

Archaeological ruin south of Beit Shemesh

- Khŭrbet el-Yarmûk
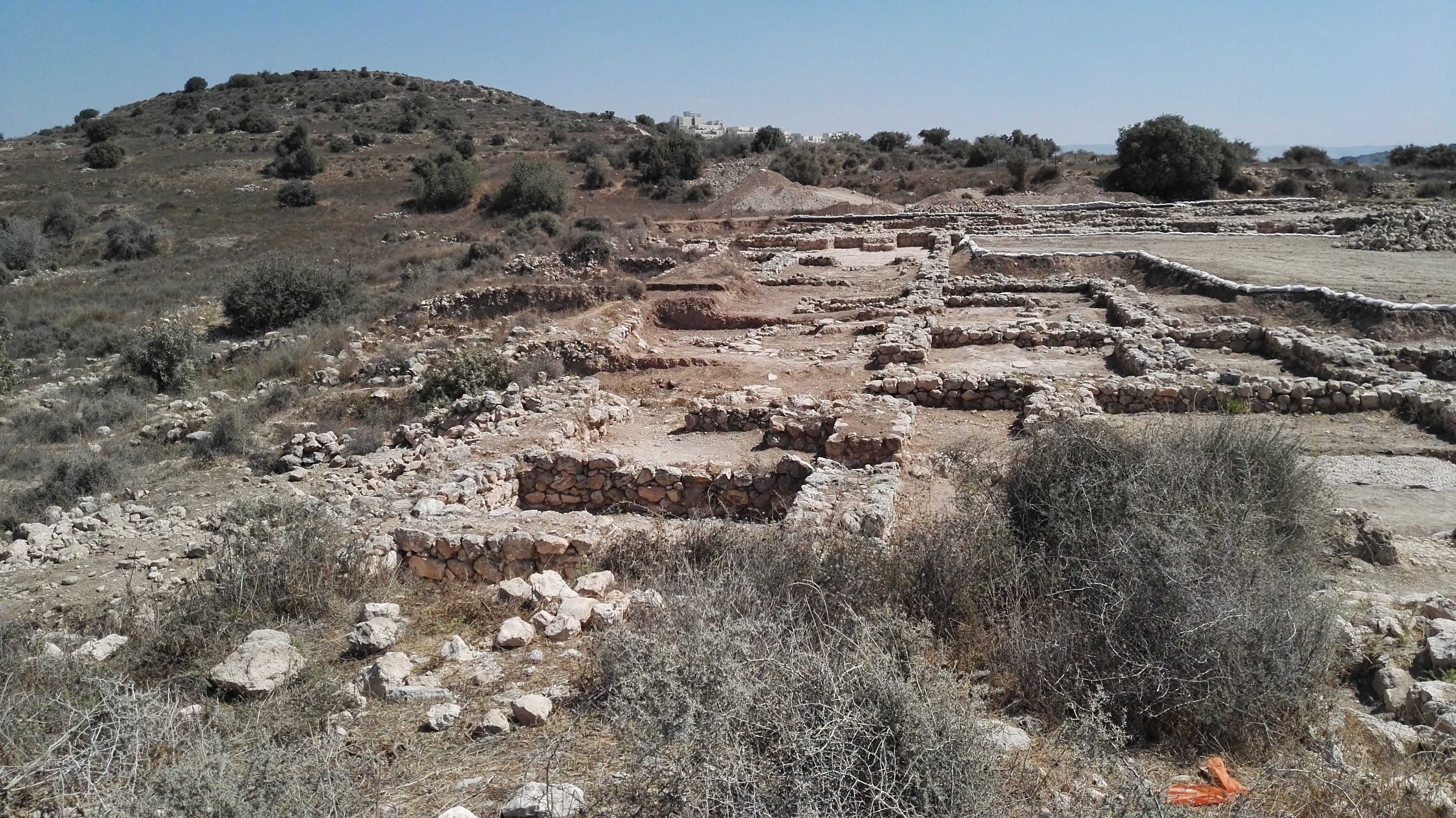
- Tel Jarmuth, near Beit Shemesh
- Interactive map of Jarmuth
- Nearest city: Beit Shemesh
- Coordinates: 31°42′30″N 34°58′30″E
- Established: Bronze Age

Jarmuth, Hebrew: יַרְמוּת, romanized: Yarmuṯ, was the name of two cities in Canaan.

The Douay–Rheims Bible has an alternative spelling, Jaramoth.

== Jarmuth near Beit Shemesh ==
Jarmuth was an Amorite city in Canaan at the time of the Israelite settlement recorded in the Hebrew Bible. According to Joshua 10:3–5, its king, Piram, was one of five kings who formed an alliance to attack Gibeon in response to Gibeon making a treaty with the Israelites led by Joshua, who had recently conquered the cities of Jericho and Ai. This Jarmuth is commonly identified with a modern site variously called Tel Yarmuth in Hebrew, Tel Jarmuth, or Khirbet el-Yarmûk in Arabic (grid position 147124 PAL). The site is located on the south of Beit Shemesh, near Bayt Nattif, and is now a National Park. The Park spans over an area of 267 dunams (nearly 66 acres).

== Jarmuth in Issachar ==
Another Jarmuth became a Levitical city given to the Gershonites within the territory of the Tribe of Issachar according to Joshua 21:20. It is not mentioned in the parallel list of Levitical cities in 1 Chronicles 6:73; Ramoth is mentioned in its place. The site of the Issacharian Jarmuth is not yet known. Some identify it with the site of Kawkab al-Hawa, which, if correct, might also correspond to Second Temple period Agrippina.

== Bibliography ==
- de Miroschedji, Pierre. (1990). The Early Bronze Age Fortifications at Tel Yarmut – An Interim Statement. Eretz-Israel: Archaeological, Historical, and Geographical Studies. Volume 21.
- Lemche, Niels Peter (2010). The A to Z of Ancient Israel. Scarecrow Press. p. 160. ISBN 978-1-4616-7172-5.
- Negev, Avraham; Gibson, Shimon, eds. (2001). Yarmut (a); Yarmut (b) (Tel); Yarmuk (Khirbet el-). New York and London: Continuum. p. 545. ISBN 0-8264-1316-1. (Snippet view).
- Robinson, Edward (1856). Biblical Researches in Palestine. Vol. II, section XI, London, p. 17.
