= Ramah =

Ramah may refer to:

== In ancient Israel ==
- Ramathaim-Zophim, the birthplace of Samuel
- Ramoth-Gilead, a Levite city of refuge
- Ramah in Benjamin, mentioned in the Book of Jeremiah and also in the Gospel of Matthew
- Baalath-Beer, also known as Ramoth of the South, in the tribe of Simeon
- a city of Asher, which seems to be difficult to identify. Some have believed it to be the same as Rameh, southeast of Tyre
- a city in Naphtali's territory. It may be the same as Khirbet Zeitun er-Rameh east of today's Rameh village

== Others ==
- Camp Ramah, a number of Jewish summer camps affiliated with the Conservative Movement of Judaism
- Ramah, the Hebrew acronym of Rabbi Meir Abulafia
- Ramah Navajo Indian Reservation, New Mexico
- Ramah, New Mexico, a town in the U.S. state of New Mexico
- Ramah, Colorado, a town in the U.S. state of Colorado
- Ramah, Newfoundland and Labrador, Canada
- Ramah, an alternate name used in the Book of Mormon for the hill Cumorah

== See also ==
- Rama (disambiguation)
- Ramoth (disambiguation)
- Rameh, on Pierre Jacotin's 1799 map as "Ramah"
