= Qoşabulaq =

Qoşabulaq or Koshabulak may refer to:

- Qoşabulaq, Gadabay, Azerbaijan
- Qoşabulaq, Jabrayil, Azerbaijan
