= Tel Yarmuth =

Archaeological site in Israel

- Tel Yarmouth
- Location within Israel
- 31°42′36″N 34°58′48″E
- Type: settlement
- Periods: Bronze Age
- Cultures: Early Dynastic Period
- Location: Israel
- Grid position: 147/124 PAL

History
- Built: circa 3000 BC
- Abandoned: 3rd millennium BC

Site notes
- Area: 18 ha (44 acres)
- Excavation dates: 1970, 1980-2009, 2016-2017
- Archaeologists: Amnon Ben-Tor, Pierre de Miroschedji, Amir Golani, Omer Shalev
- Condition: Ruined
- Owner: Public
- Public access: Yes

Tel Yarmuth (also Tel Yarmouth, Tell Yarmuk, Tell Yarmuth, Tell Yarmouth, and Tel Yarmut; Hebrew name) or Khirbet Yarmuk (Arabic name) is an ancient Near East archaeological site in Israel located 25 kilometers southwest of Jerusalem and near modern Beit Shemesh. It is a large primarily single-period (EB II/III) site and has been suggested as possibly being the city of Jarmuth, being only a tentative identification, as it is based solely on the similarity of the Hebrew name with the Arabic name and its areal location.

== History ==
=== Early Bronze Age ===
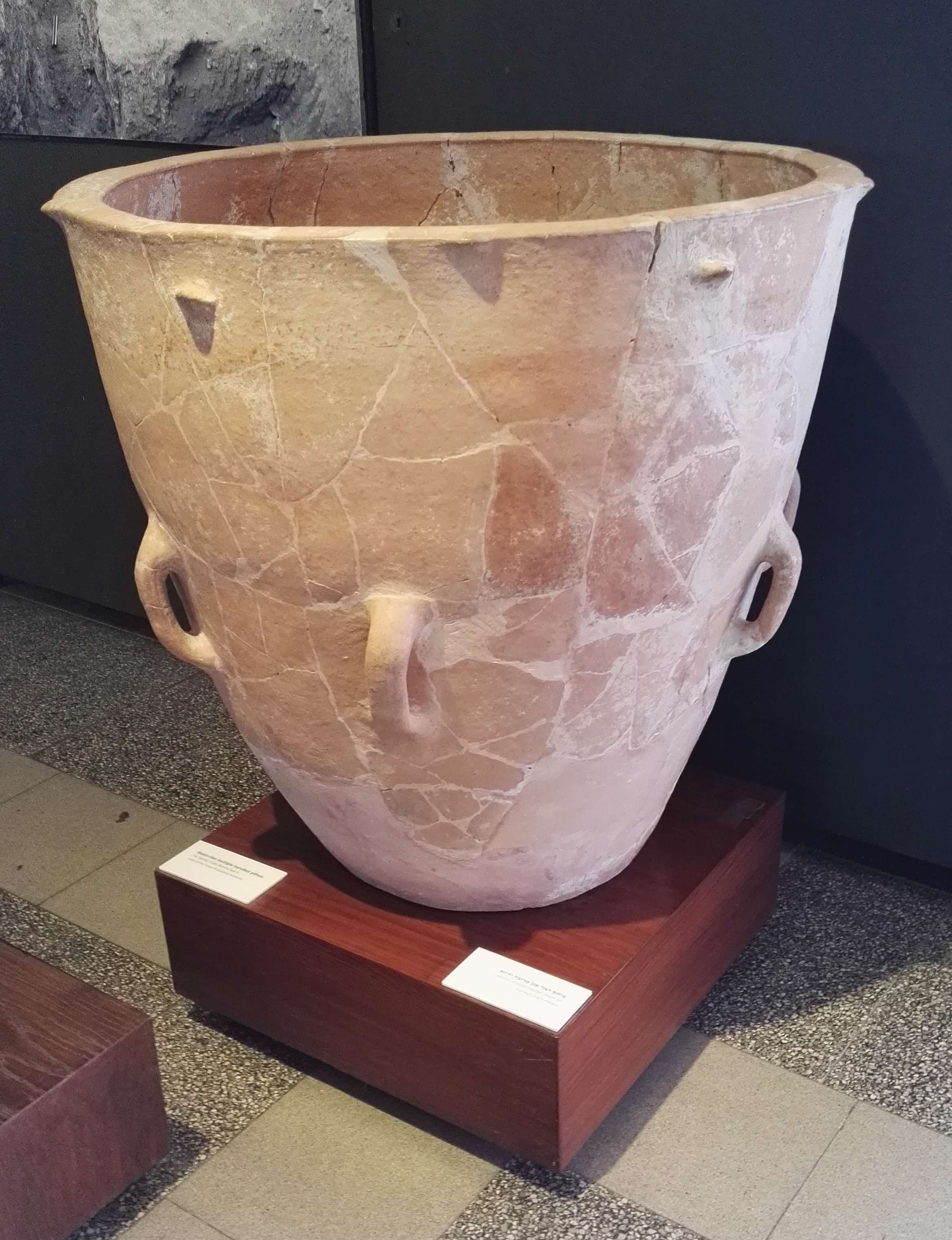
Early Bronze Age vessel found at Tel Yarmuth

The Early Bronze Age I settlement is known only from pottery and a single basalt spindle whorl. Assumed EB I remains are under meters of occupational overburden and have therefore not been excavated. The entire site including the lower town was heavily occupied in the Early Bronze (EB) II and III periods. The site was abandoned around 2400 BC, during EB III and only saw sporadic small levels of occupation on the acropolis alone.

The Early Bronze II and III periods monumental construction began including the large "White Building", a plastered masonry broad-room temple with a side altar. In EB II a small palace was constructed (B1), termed a "proto-palace by the excavators, measuring 1750 square meters. In EB IIIA a large palace (B2) was built measuring 6000 square meters was built on top of the first palace. This palace was destroyed in the EB IIIB period. At its peak the city had massive sophisticated fortifications and a large main city gate (Area E). The first city wall (Wall A) was made of stone, was 6 meters deep and is preserved to 4 meters in height and a glacis added to its exterior. A larger wall (Wall B) was later added 20 meters outside of that built of cyclopean construction. The fortifications were subsequently improved even further by filling in the area between the two walls. A number of EB III flint Canaanite blades, believed to be used as sickle inserts or in threshing, were found.

Early Bronze period material from Tel Yarmuth has been radiocarbon dated (calibration - IntCal09) and is being used to support the contention that EB III ended around 2500 BC. Samples tested were "3 from Final EB IB, 15 from EB II, and 19 from EB III". Results were Final EB IB to EB II transition between 3030 and 2960 BC, EB II to EB III transition between 2980 and 2910 BC.

Plant remains from EB II and EB III showed numerous remains from olive cultivation and processing (no plant remains from EB I are yet available for study). In an area of the Lower City an installation with paved floors, pithoi, basins, basalt grinding stones and calcareous mortars was found, thought to have been used for olive processing. Similar installations have been found at Beth Yerah and other contemporary sites.

=== Middle Bronze ===
The acropolis was lightly re-occupied, based on potsherd finds, in the Middle Bronze IIA.

=== Late Bronze Age ===
The site saw some occupation on the acropolis in the Late Bronze Age II. It included 13th century BC Mycenaean and Cypriot sherds. The only other epigraphic find was a hoe with a partial hieroglyphic inscription in a hoard of bronze objects, mostly fragmentary. They were dated to the time of the 19th Dynasty (12th century BC) and may not be in their original context.

=== Iron Age ===
Somewhat more substantial building occurred on the acropolis in Iron I times. Finds from that period included a 2nd-century BC jar handle with a yršlm (Jerusalem) stamp. The yršlm stamp was intitially thought to have been in use 257‒221 BC contemporary with Ptolemy III Euergetes and high priest Onias II however later scholarship changed that to the early 2nd century BC, during the early days of the Hasmonean dynasty which was founded in 165 BC. Single yršlm stamps have been found at 16 site, 34 at Ramat Raḥel, and 61 at and near Jerusalem.

=== Hellenistic, Roman, and Byzantine periods ===
No Hellenistic or Roman periods records of Yarmuth have survived, although potsherds from the Roman period have been discerned. Some Early Byzantine era terraces and potsherds were found in the lower town area.

== Archaeology ==
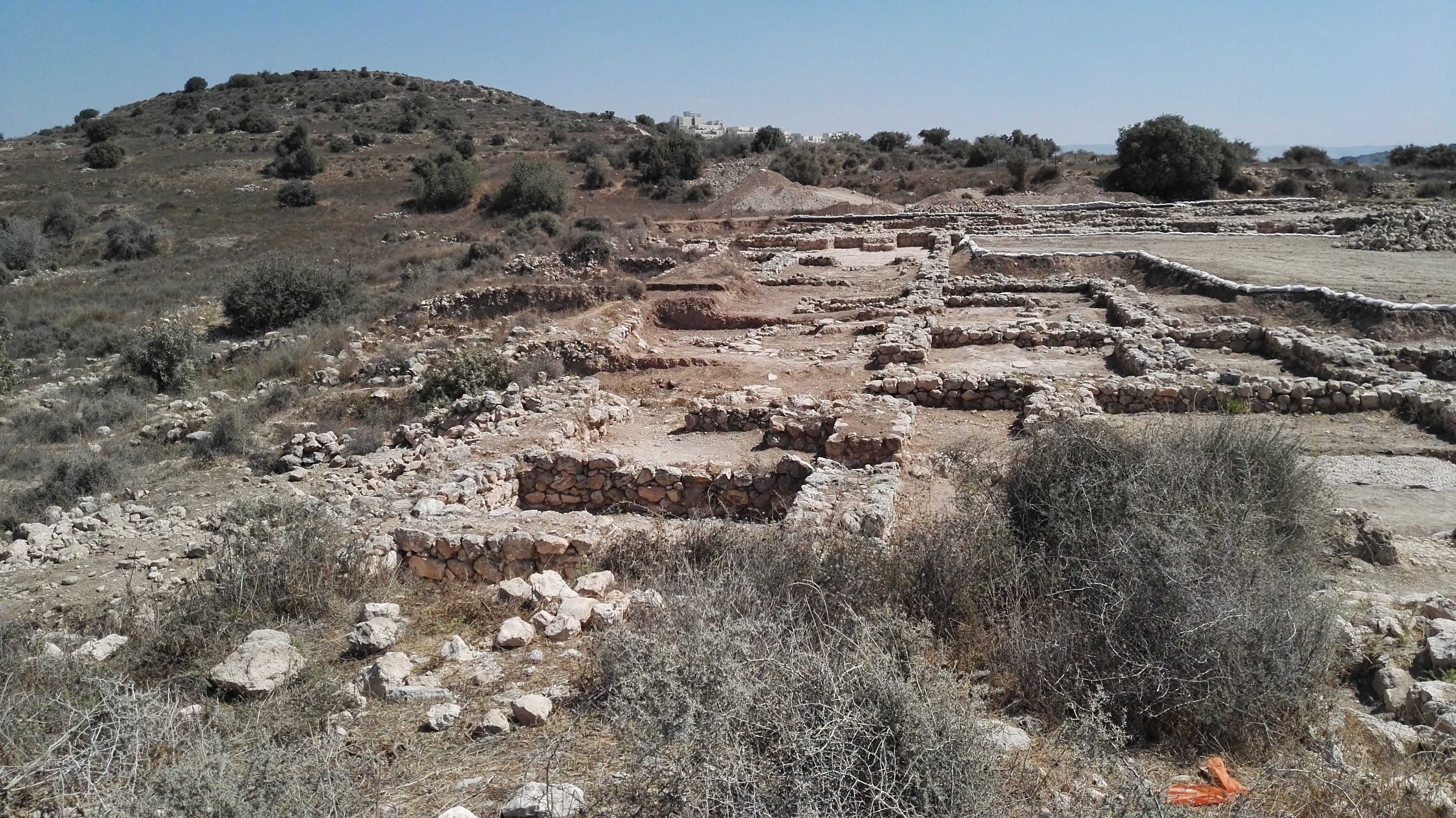
Tel Yarmuth

The site is about 18 hectares (44 acres) in extent. The high point, 1.8 hectares (4.4 acres) in area, lies on the eastern side with a lower town extending to the west. The site is roughly 640 by 420 meters.

The mound, then known as Khirbet Yarmuk, was visited by French archaeologist Victor Guérin in 1863. American archaeologist Frederick J. Bliss, who visited the site at the start of the 20th-century, remarked seeing interior walls of a building that were 4 feet and 6 inches thick in diameter, and that early Roman and Arab potsherds could be seen there. A survey of the site was conducted by Adam Druks in 1963. A. Ben-Tor conducted a sounding there in 1970 on behalf of the Hebrew University.

Tel Yarmuth was excavated between 1980 and 2009 by Pierre de Miroschedji under the auspices of the French National Centre for Scientific Research (CNRS).

Beginning in the 1990s the Beit Shemesh area underwent a period of rapid development which endangered the archaeological site, especially in Ramat Beit Shemesh. In order to protect the site it was declared a national park and excavations were conducted by a team led by Amir Golani and Omer Shalev under the auspices of the Israel Antiquities Authority in 2016 and 2017 in preparation for public access. Work focused on a palace are (Palace B1) and a domestic area to the southeast of the palace (Area J). Vandalism, mainly at the EB II monumental gateway (Area E), was repaired. Fifteen squares were also opened in an area that would be destroyed by construction in Neighborhood D of Ramat Bet Shemesh.

Excavators have established an occupational periodization for Tel Yarmuth:

- Early Bronze Age IB - 3300–3100 BC - unfortified village
- Early Bronze Age II - 3100–2700 BC - urban center with two fortification walls and glacis
- Early Bronze Age III - 2700–2300 BC - 6,000 square meter palace, are between walls filled
- Hiatus
- Middle Bronze Age II - 17th/16th century BC - minor level of occupation
- Hiatus
- Late Bronze Age to Byzantine - acropolis only

== Jarmuth ==
The only possible record for Jarmuth for this time-period (c. 539–331 BC) is taken from the Hebrew Bible, specifically the account of Nehemiah who returned with the Jewish exiles from the Babylonian captivity, during the reign of Artaxerxes I (r. 465-424 BC). According to Ezra, the acclaimed author of the book, some of these returnees had settled in Jarmuth, as shown in Nehemiah 11:25–29 of the Hebrew Bible. The political entity that was established in Judea at the time was that of a vassal state, as Judea became a province of the Persian Empire, governed by a satrap.

In the Hebrew Bible, Joshua 15:33–36, Jarmuth is mentioned along with the cities Adullam and Socho as occupying a place in the Land of Canaan, in the region geographically known as the Shefelah, or what is a place of transition between the mountainous region and the coastal plains. Also in the Hebrew Bible, Joshua 12:7–11, the king of Jarmuth was slain by Joshua and the Israelites during their conquest of the land of Canaan.

In the late 8th-century BC (ca. 700 BC), Jarmuth was in the territorial domain belonging to king Hezekiah of Judah. In the 14th-year of King Hezekiah's reign, Sennacherib of Assyria (r. 705-681 BC) embarked on his third military campaign, this time against the cities of the Levant, including against the king of Sidon and against Jerusalem in Judah, where King Hezekiah was besieged, based on 2 Kings 18:137 in the Hebrew Bible. Many of the king's important cities in Judah were at that time taken by Sennacherib and given over to other potentates faithful to Sennacherib. Although Jarmuth is not specifically named in the prism (Sennacherib's Annals) detailing Sennacherib's exploits, it can be assumed by the account that the city did not go unscathed:

"As for Hezekiah, the Jew, who did not submit to my yoke, forty-six of his strong, walled cities, as well as the small cities in their neighborhood, which were without number...I besieged and took. Two-hundred thousand, and one-hundred and fifty people, great and small, male and female, horses, mules, asses, camels, cattle and sheep, without number, I brought away from them and counted as spoil. Himself, like a caged bird, I shut up in Jerusalem his royal city... The cities of his, which I had despoiled, I cut off from his land and to Mitinti, king of Ashdod, [and to] Padi, king of Ekron, [and to] Silli-bel, king of Gaza, I gave. And (thus) I diminished his land."

== See also ==
- Cities of the ancient Near East
- Tell es-Sakan

== Gallery ==
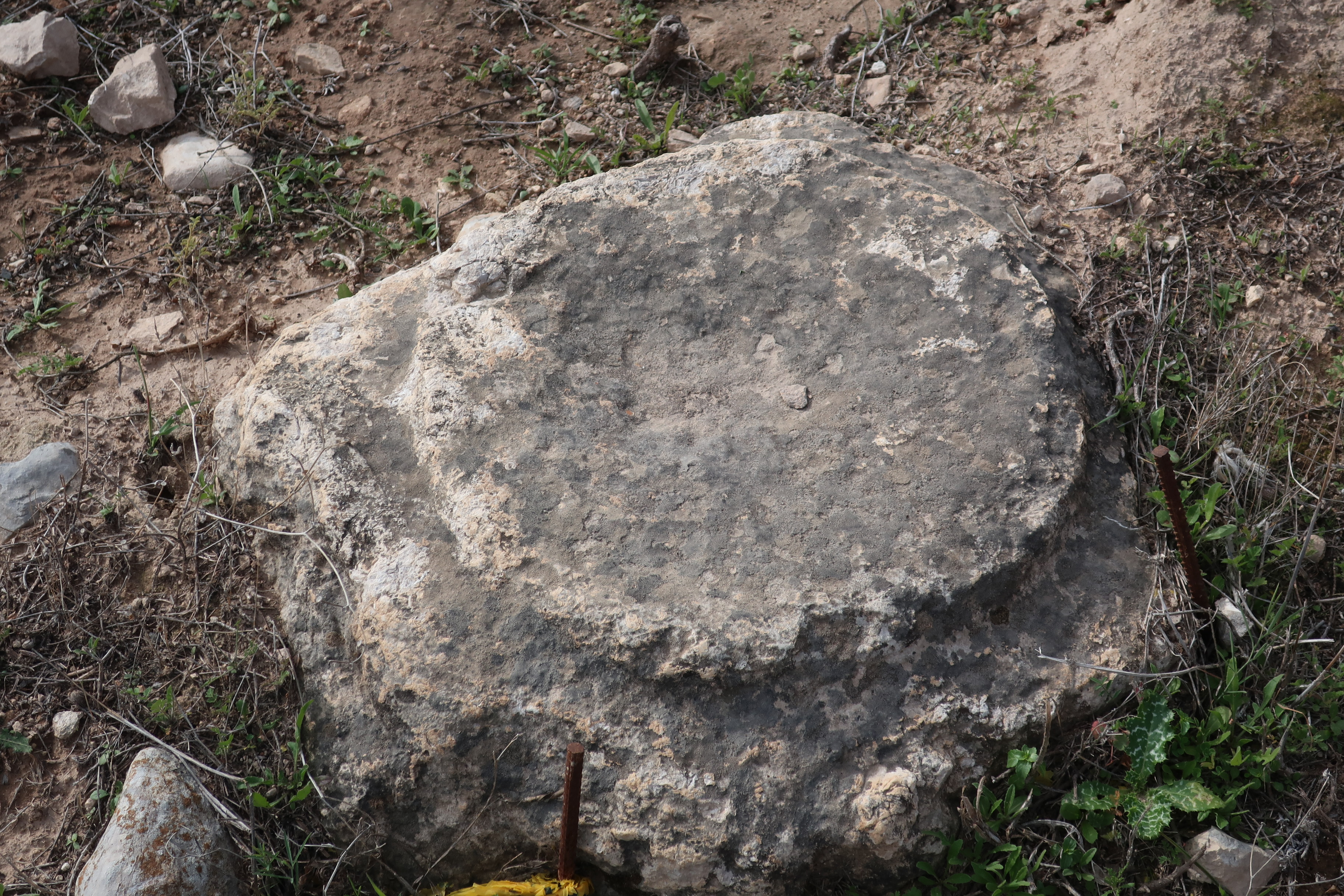
Base of column from ancient structure

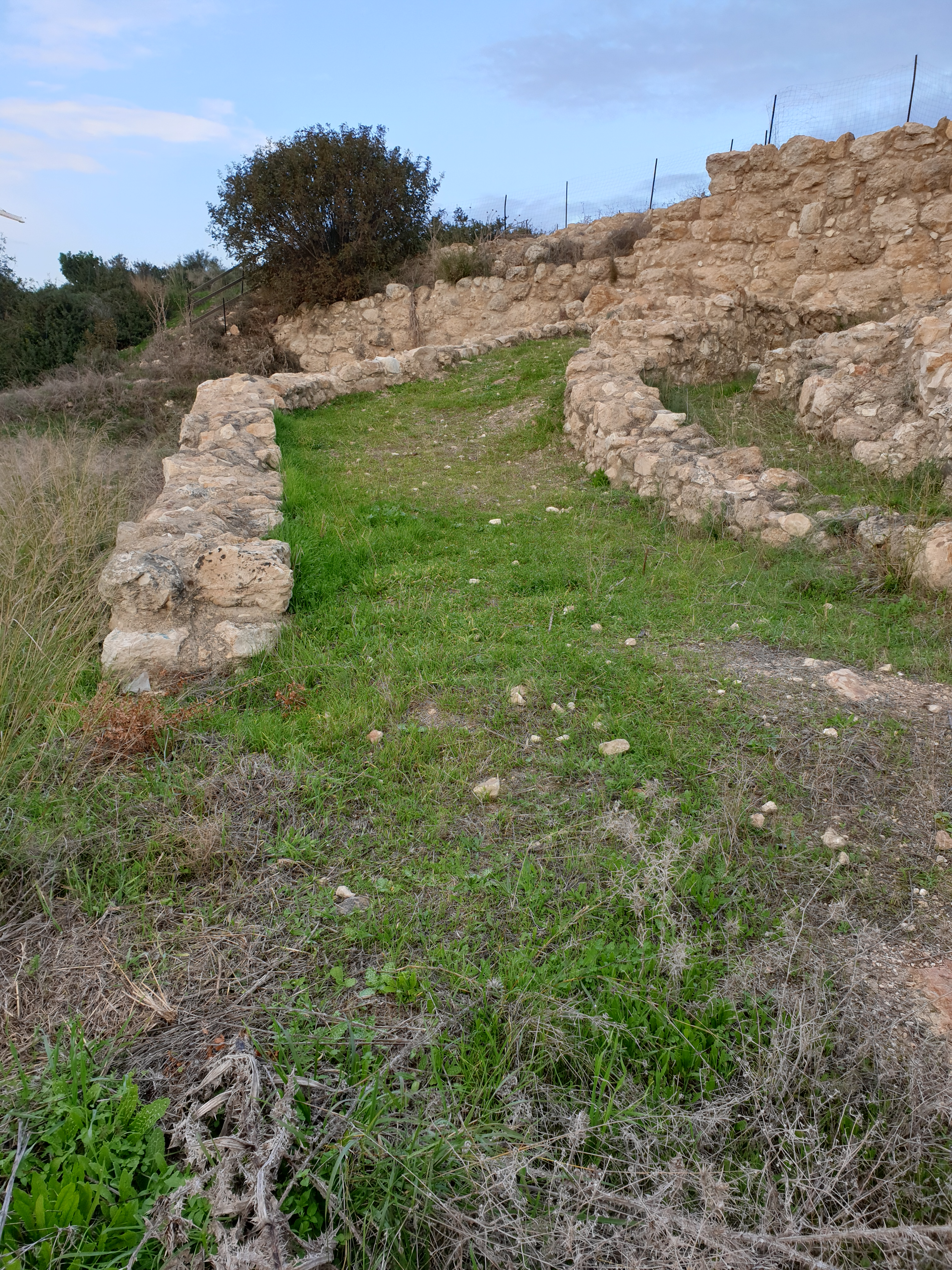
Ramp leading to the gateway

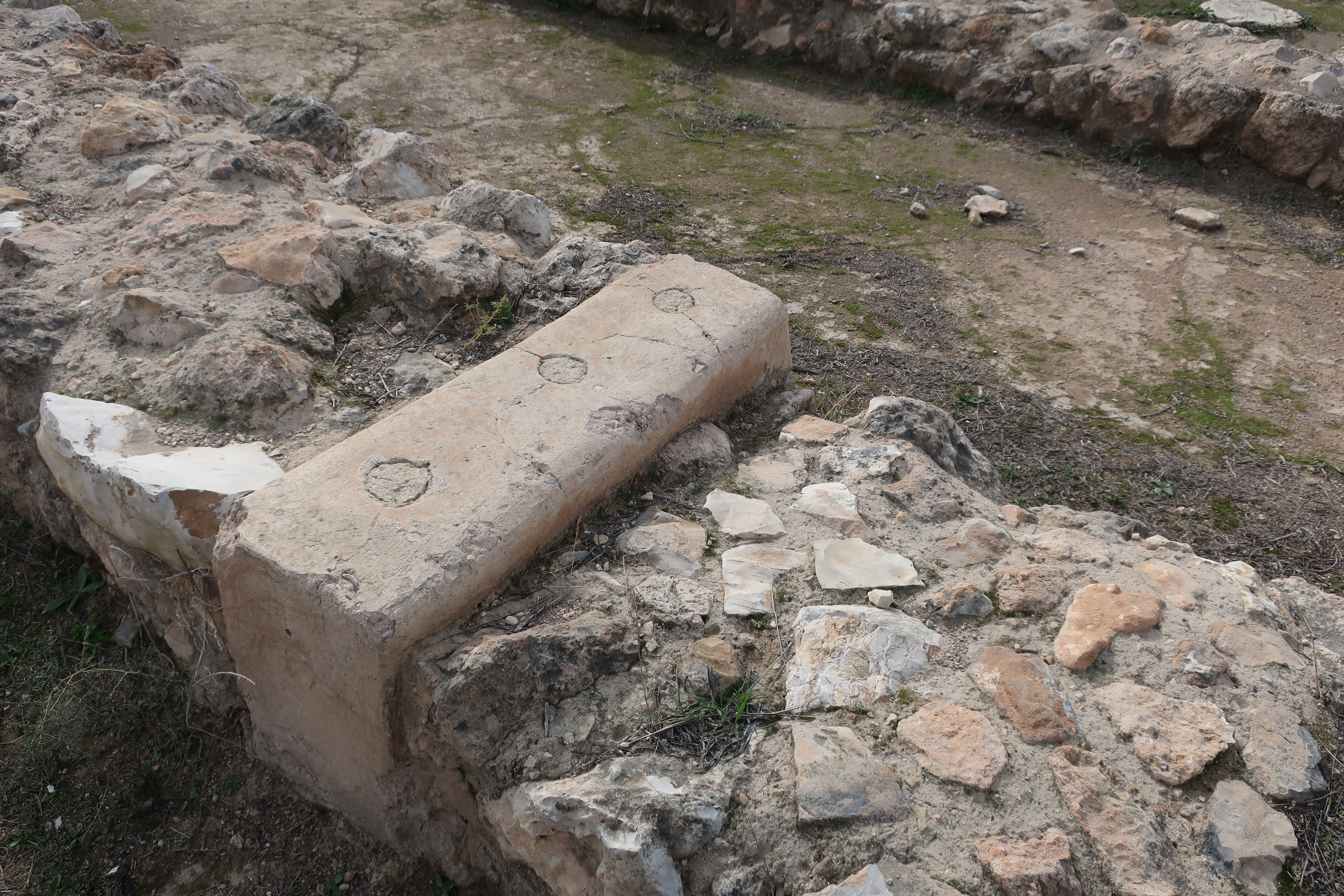
Dressed stone at Tel Yarmuth

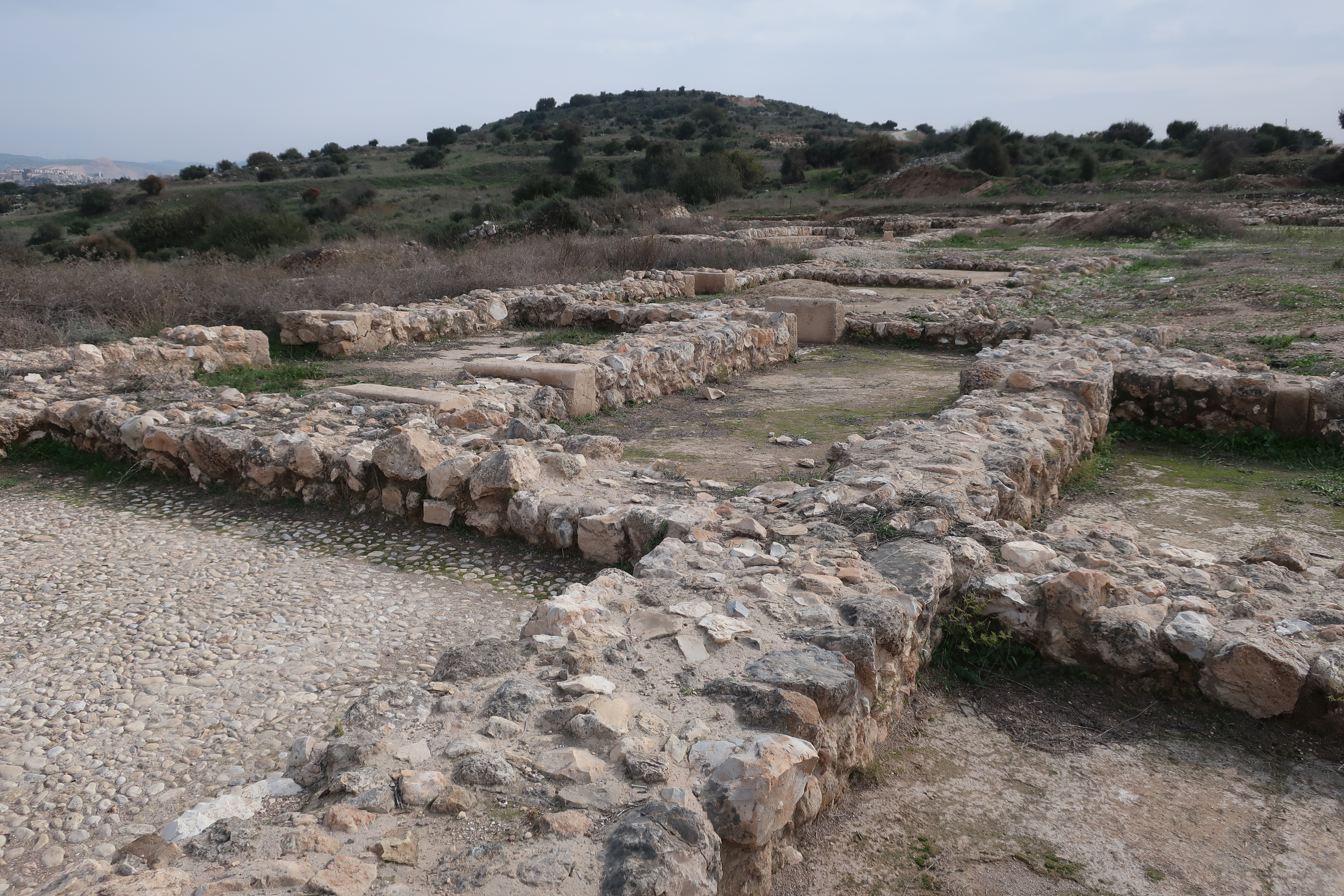
Fieldstones embedded in mortar at Tel Yarmuth

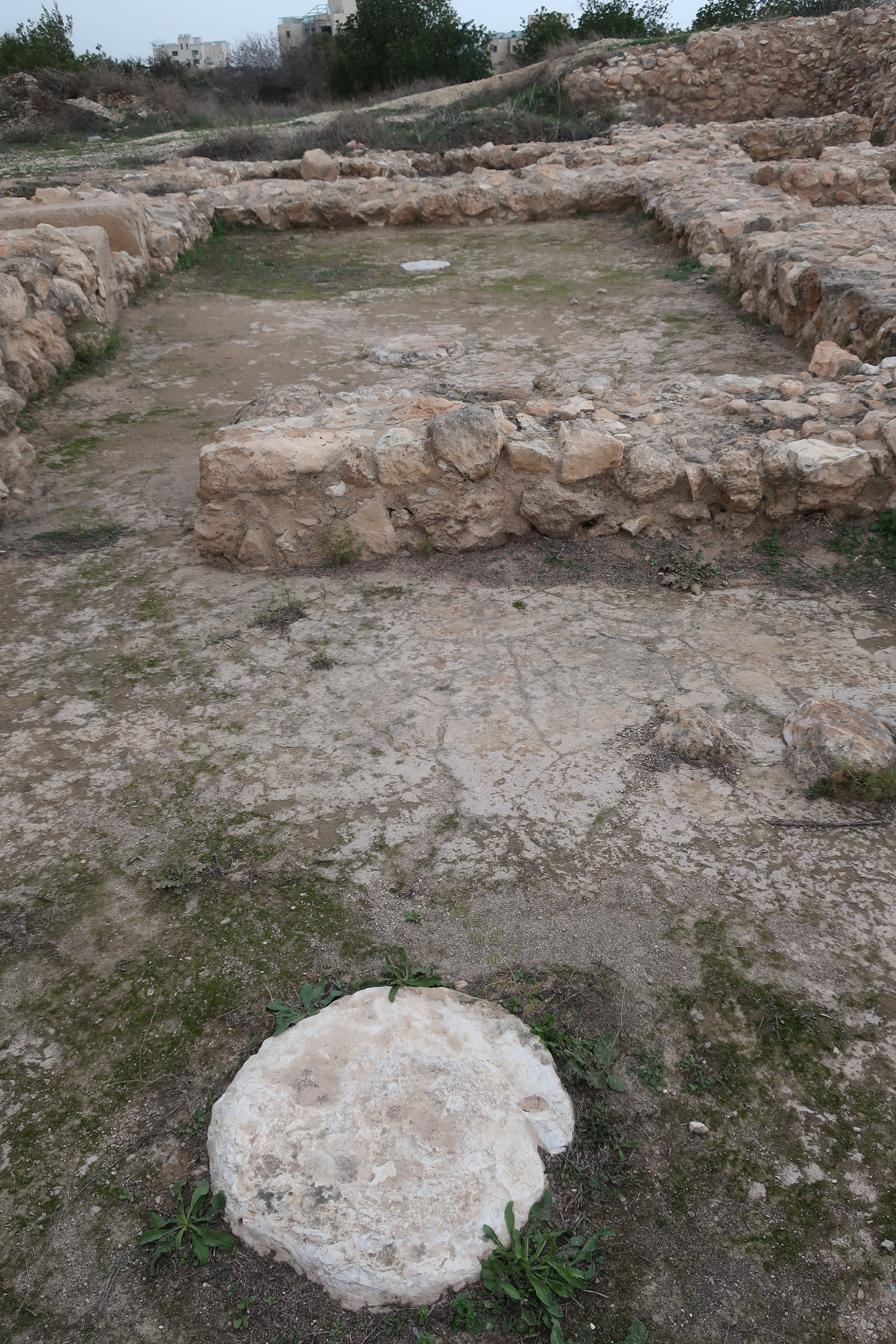
Foundation of house showing three bases of columns

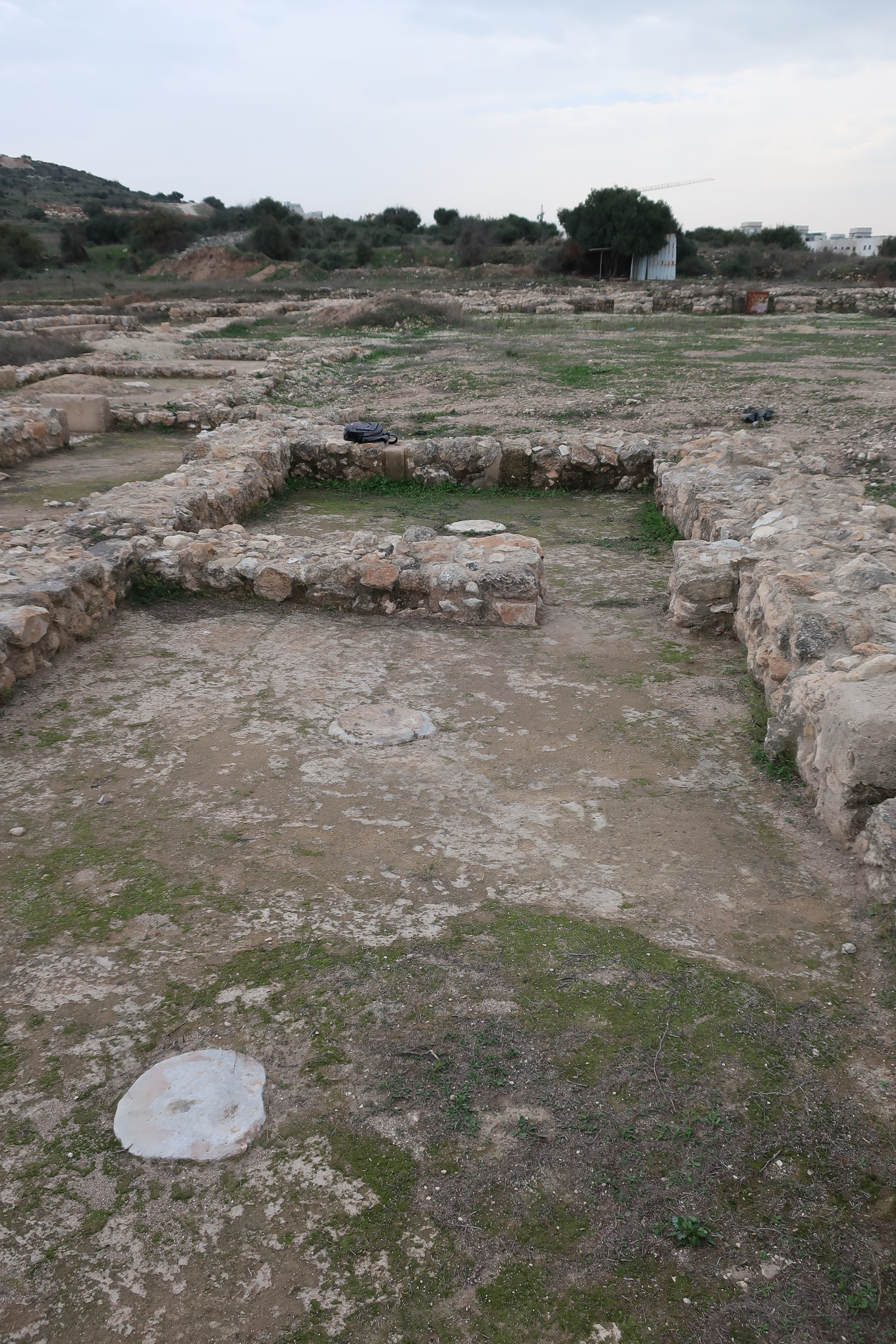
Foundations of large house

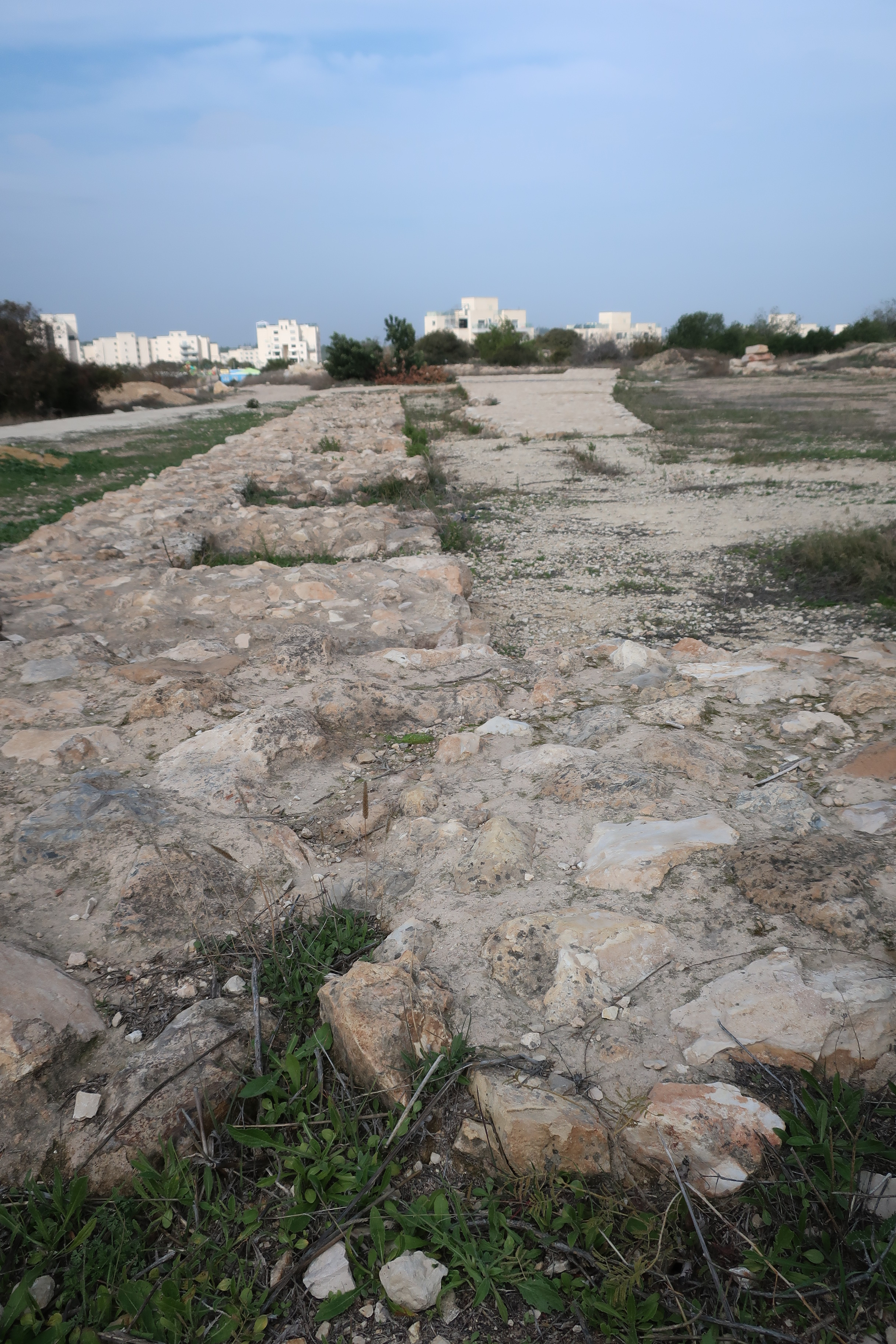
General view of stone walls at Tel Yarmuth

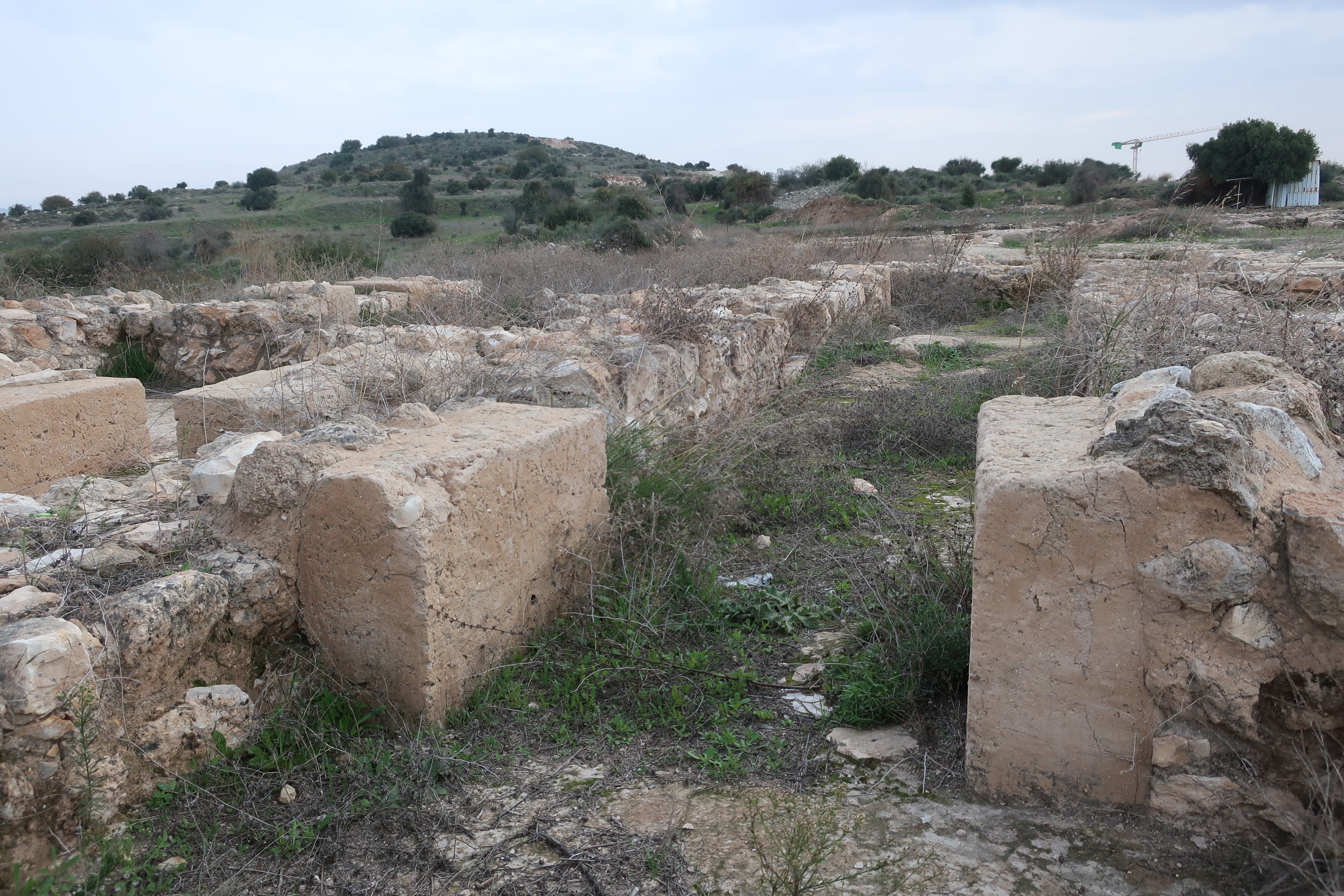
Jambs of doorway

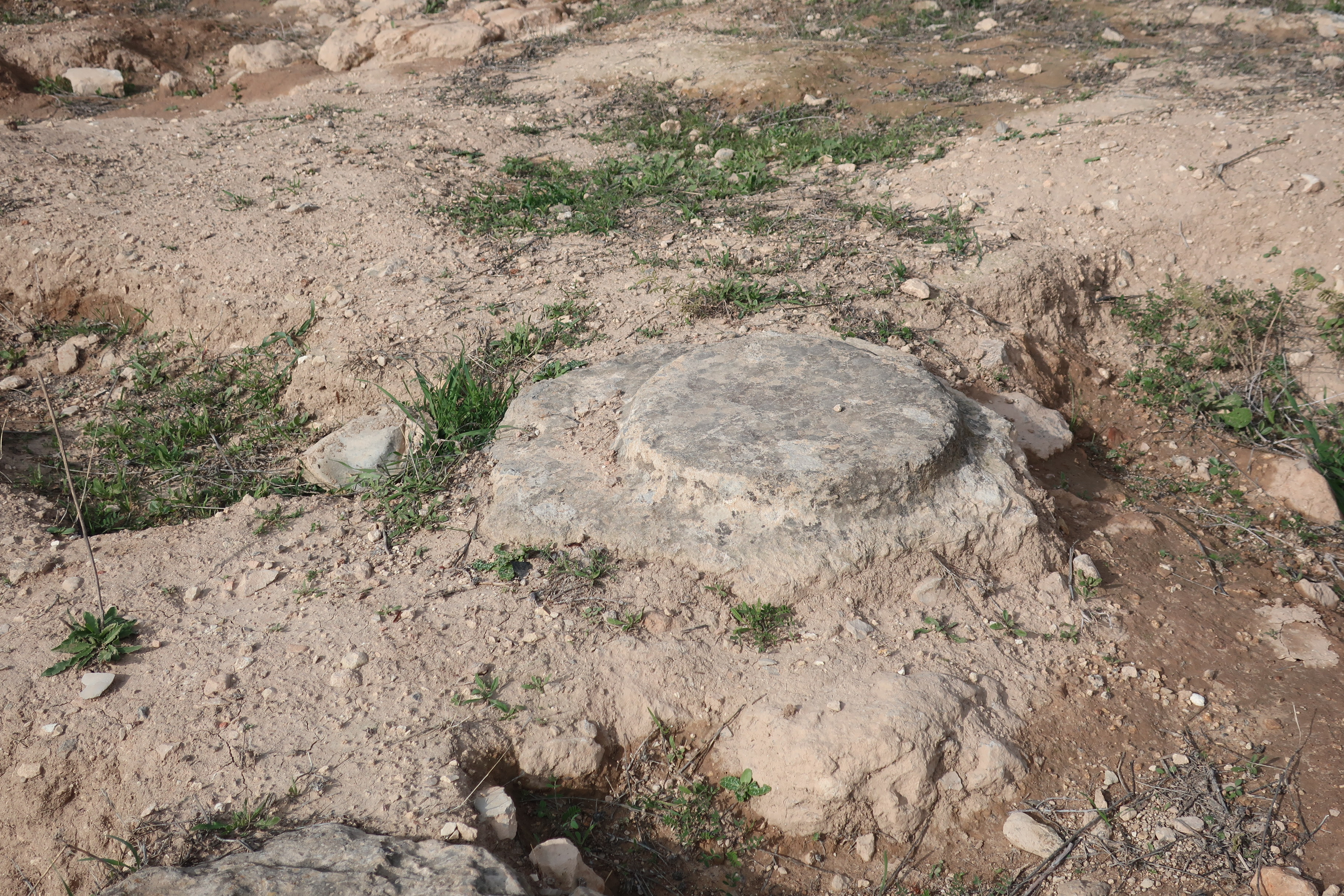
Remains of column base

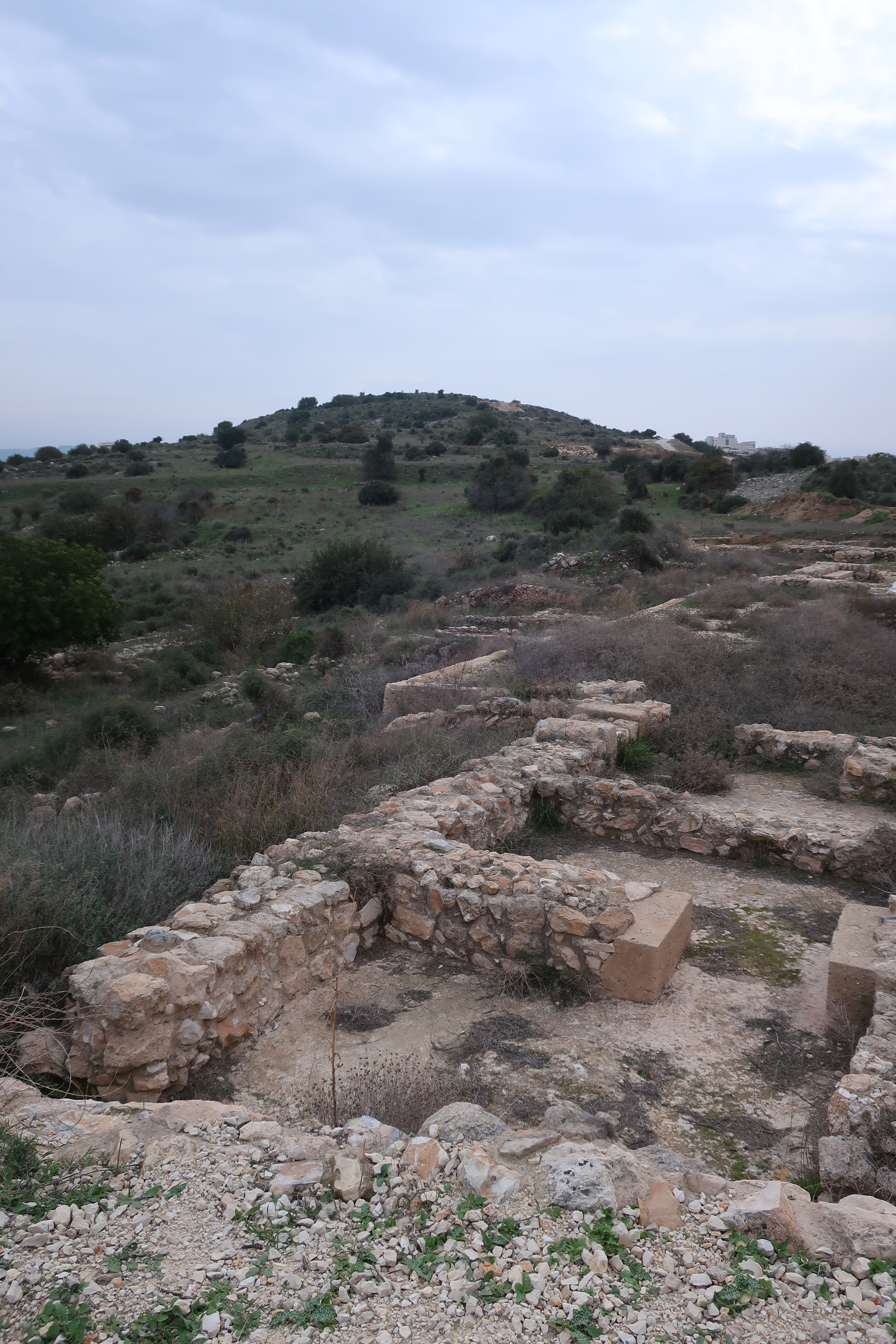
Ruins of Yarmuth

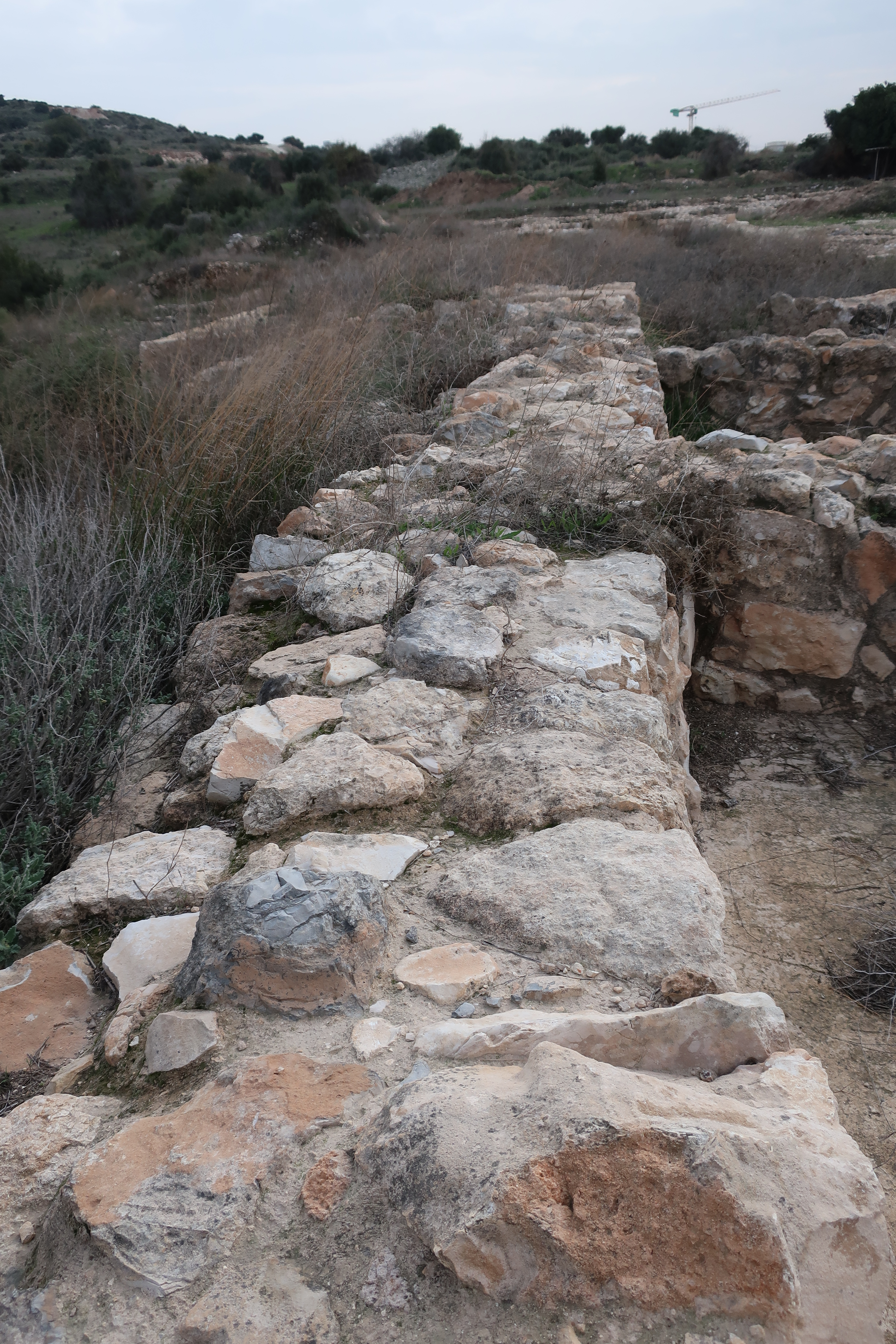
Thick stone wall at Tel Yarmuth

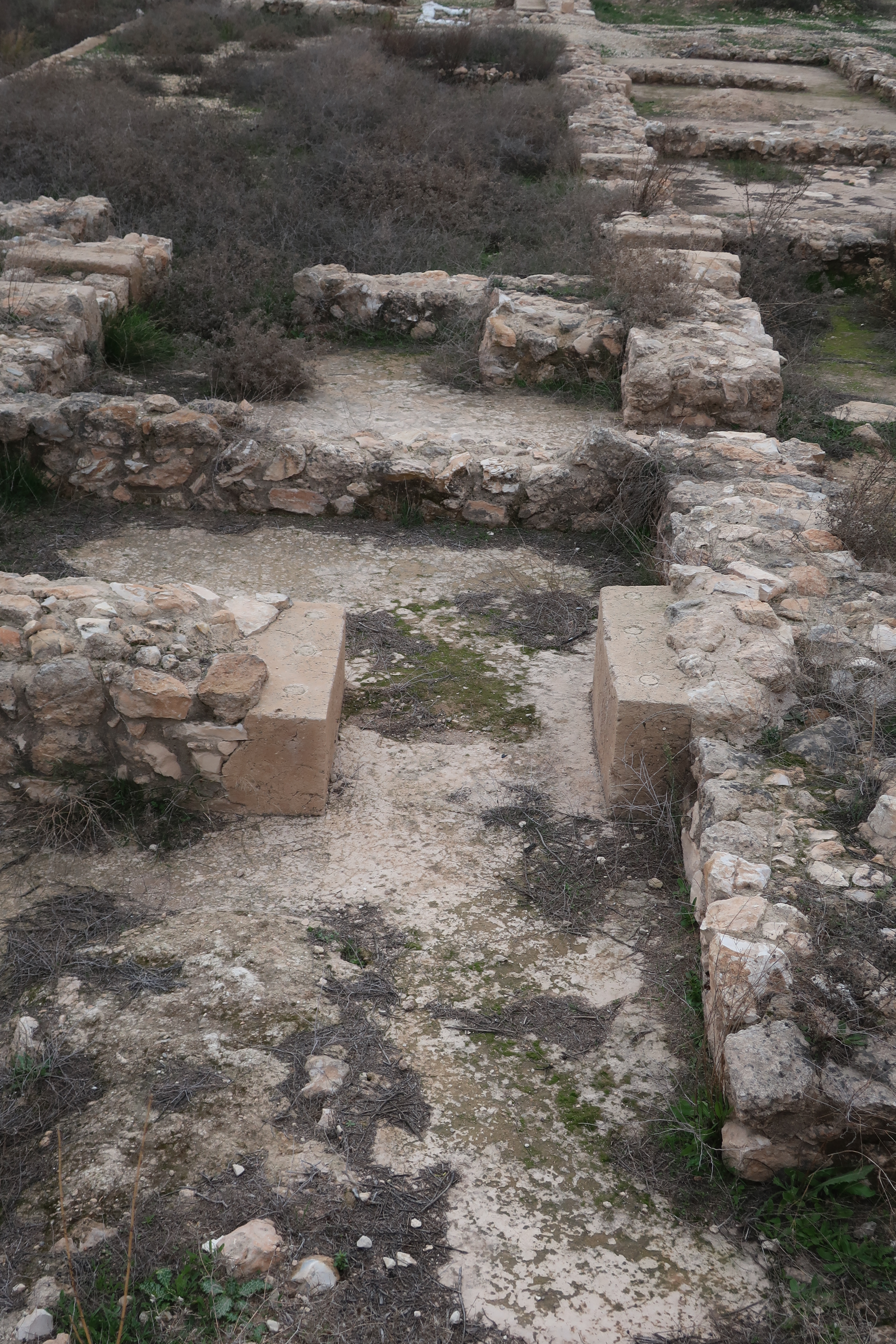
View of archaeological site

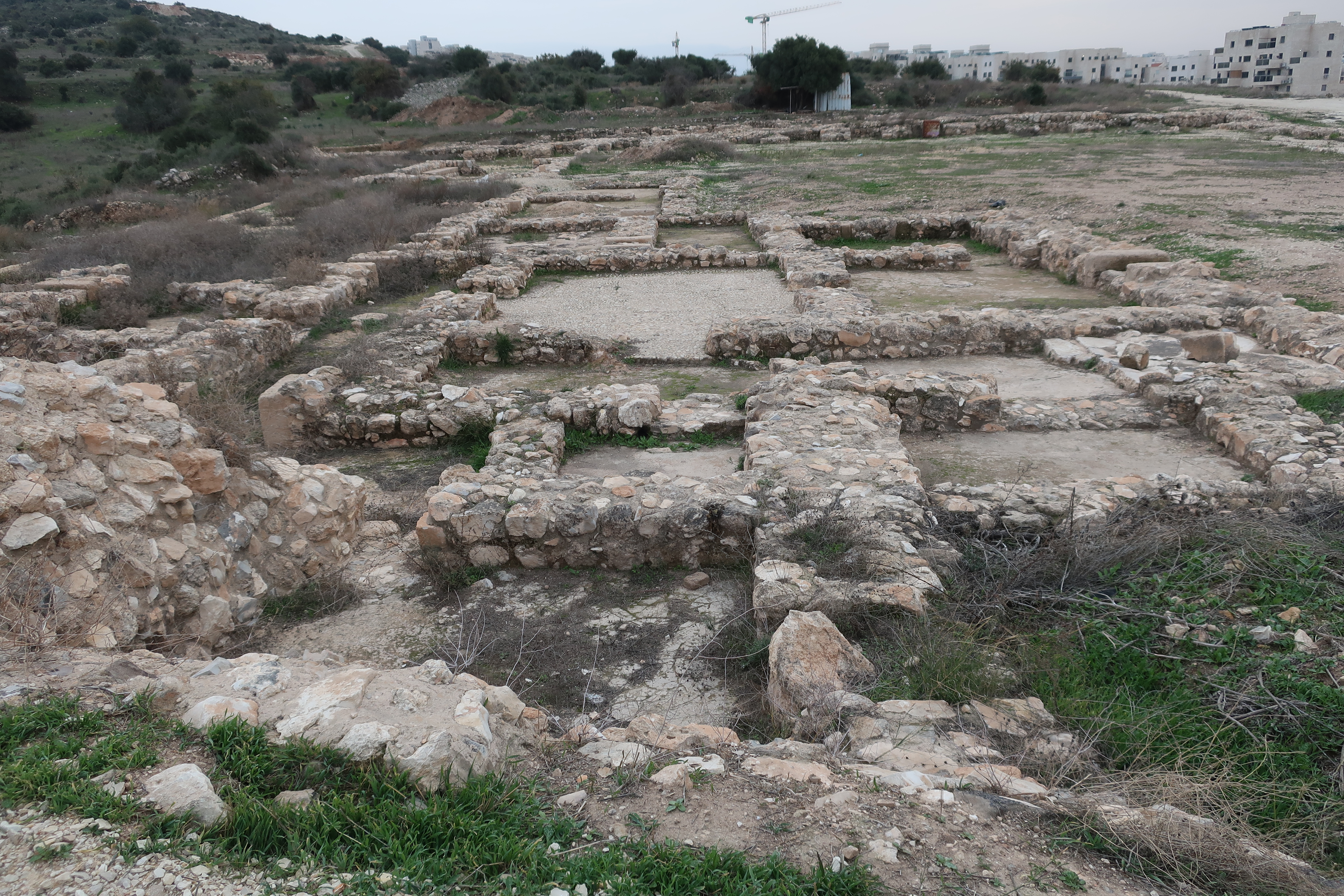
General view of ruins

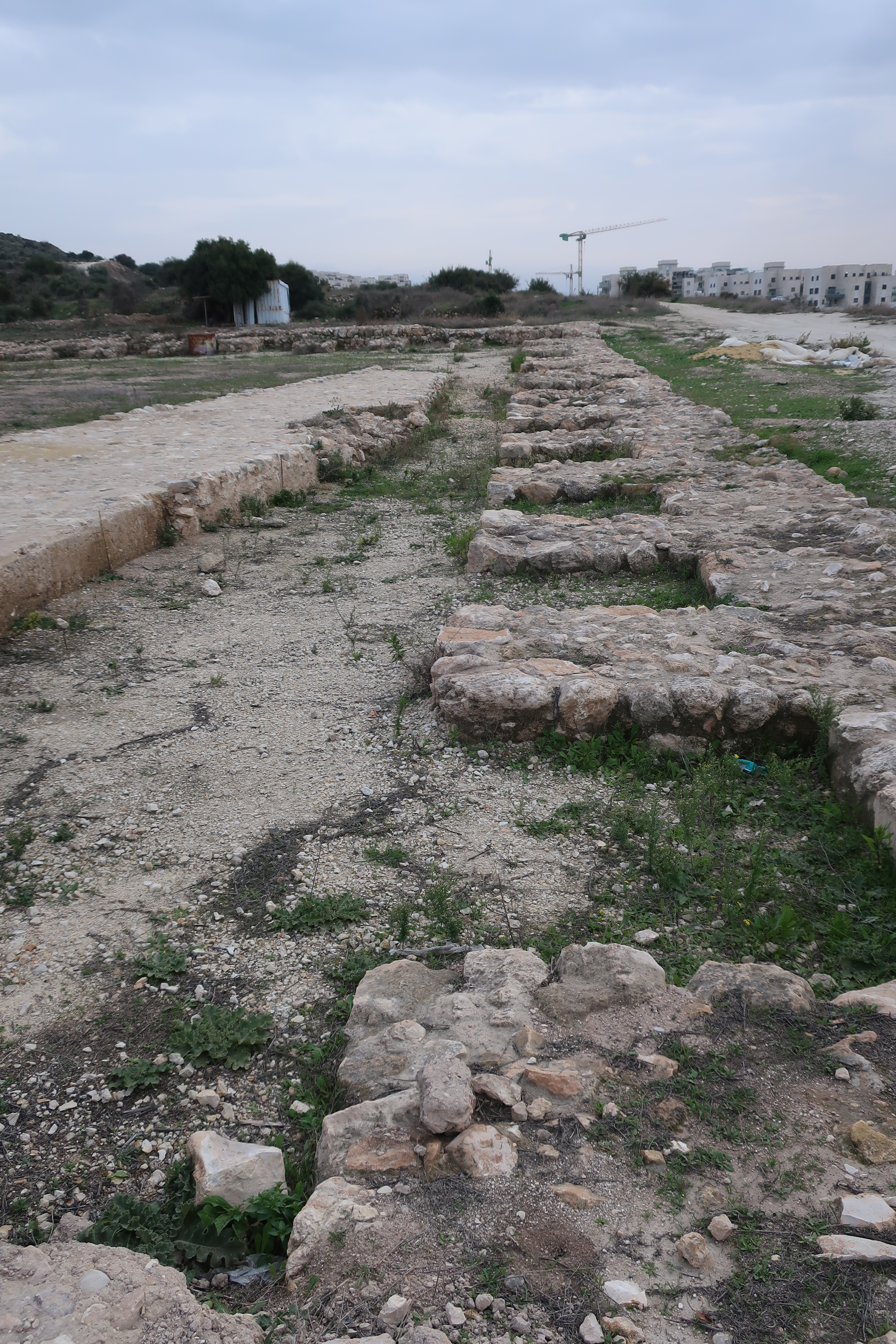
Defensive wall of Tel Yarmuth

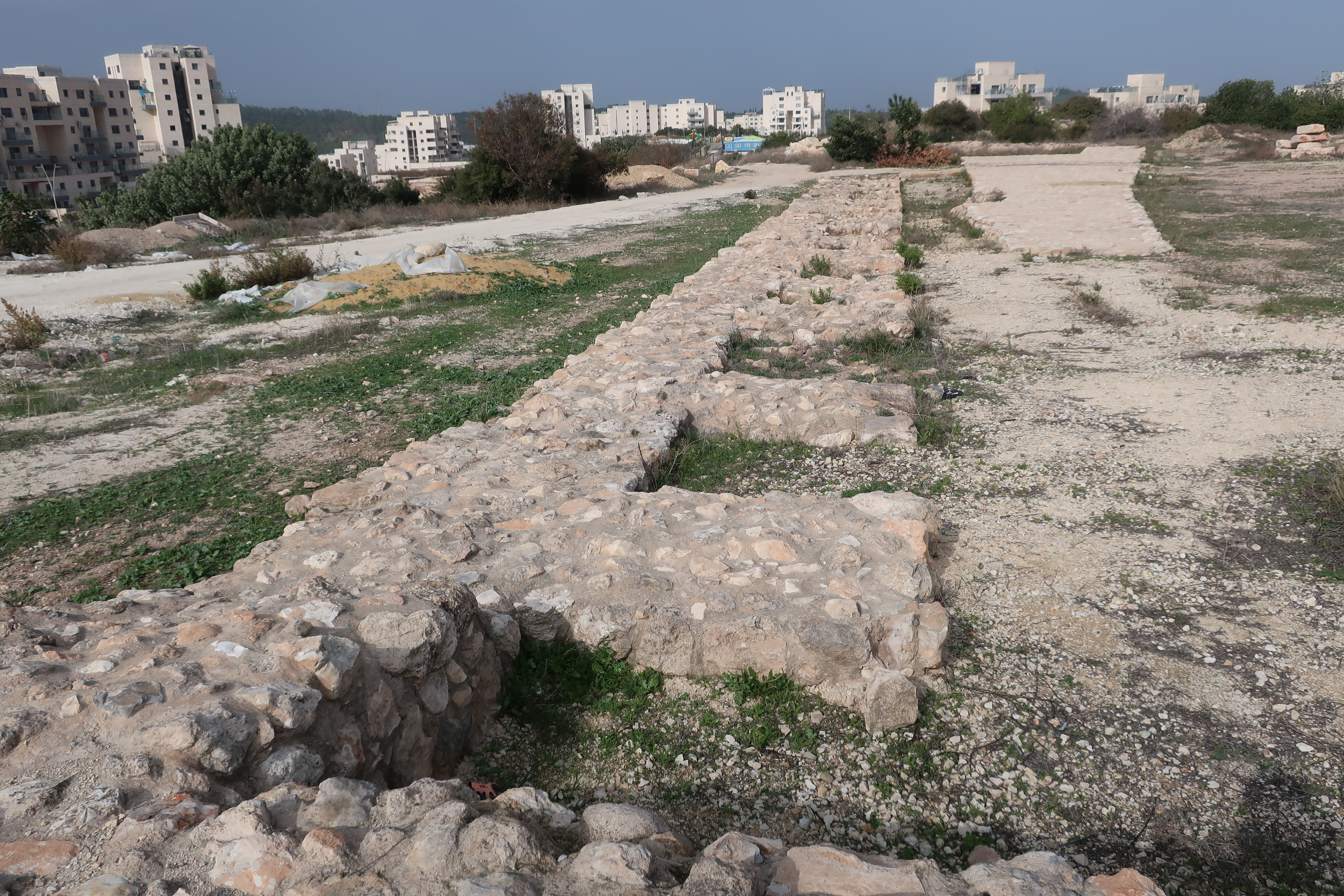
Walled city of Yarmuth (Jarmuth)

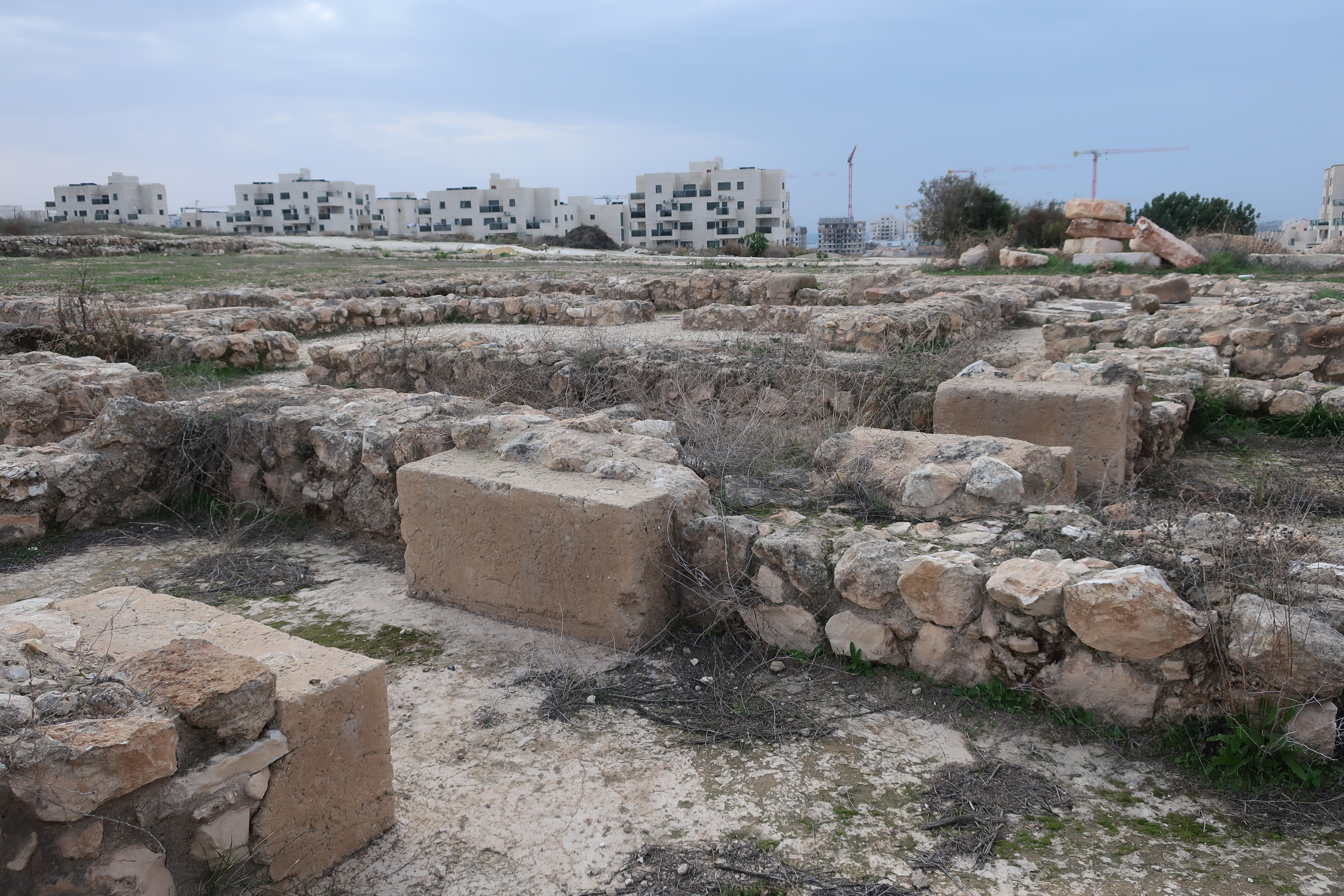
Walled structures
