= Ramji =

Ramji may refer to:

- Ramji (cinematographer), Indian film cinematographer
- Ram G, Indian film choreographer and actor
- Ramji, a fictional character in the 2005 Indian film Ramji Londonwaley
- Ramji Rao, a fictional character in Indian films including Ramji Rao Speaking (1989)

== See also ==
- Rama (disambiguation)
- Ram (disambiguation)
