= Qoşabulaq, Gadabay =

Qoşabulaq
- Municipality
- Location within Azerbaijan
- Coordinates: 40°45′38″N 45°45′11″E
- Country: Azerbaijan
- Rayon: Gadabay

Population
  - Total: 2,224
- Time zone: UTC+4 (AZT)
  - Summer (DST): UTC+5 (AZT)

Qoşabulaq (also, Koshabulak) is a village and municipality in the Gadabay Rayon of Azerbaijan. It has a population of 2,224. The municipality consists of the villages of Qoşabulaq, Totuqlu, and Tərs yer.
