= Basanta Kumari Patnaik =

Odia-language Indian author (1923–2013)

- Born: 15 December 1923; Bhanjanagar, Ganjam district, Odisha
- Died: 29 March 2013 (aged 89)
- Occupations: novelist, short story writer, playwright, poet and essayist
- Relatives: Rajkishore Patnaik (brother); Hemanta Kumari Nanda (sister)
- Writing career
- Language: Odia
- Notable works: Amada Bata; Chorabali; Alibha Chita
- Notable awards: Atibadi Jagannath Das award

Basanta Kumari Patnaik (15 December 1923 – 29 March 2013) was an Odia language novelist, short story writer, playwright, poet and essayist; considered to be one of the pioneers in Odia literature. She became famous for her three novels: Amada Bata (lit. The Untroddden Path), Chorabali and Alibha Chita, among which Amada Bata has been adapted into an Odia film by same name.

== Biography ==
Basanta Kumari was born on 15 December 1923 in Bhanjanagar, a town in Ganjam district of state of Odisha in a Karan family. She spent most of her life in Cuttack city. She completed her MA in economics from Ravenshaw College, Cuttack.

Along with her brother, Rajkishore Patnaik, she founded a publishing company known as Shanti Nibas Bani Mandira, which was active from 1959 to 1962.

She died on 29 March 2013.

== Works ==
Basanta Kumari is considered to be one of the pioneers in Odia literature.

In 1950, Basanta Kumari published her first novel, Amada Bata (lit. The Untroddden Path), which was well received by readers. It was followed by Chorabali (1973), Alibha Chita and other four novels. Sabhyatara Saja (1950; The Veneer of Civilization) and Patala Dheu (1952) and Jivanchinha (1959) are her short story collections. She published two poetry collections: Chintanala (1956) and Taranga; and two plays: Jaura Bhatta (1952) and Mruga Trushna (1956). Her novel Amada Bata, considered to be her magnum opus, was adapted into an Odia film by the same name. It tells a story of the middle-class family of Cuttack and its attempts to get their daughter married. Amada Bata is noted for its realistic portrayal of women's characters.

Her writings reflects the domestic and social life of 20th-century Odisha. She co-translated, with her sister Hemanta Kumari Nanda, a philosophical work of Jiddu Krishnamurti.

== Recognition ==
The Odia Sahitya Akademi awarded her Atibadi Jagannath Das award. She is the first and only Odia woman writer to have received Atibadi Jagannath Das award.
