= Totuqlu =

Human settlement in Azerbaijan

Coordinates: 40°45′N 45°44′E

Totuqlu (also, Totuxlu) is a village in the municipality of Qoşabulaq in the Gadabay Rayon of Azerbaijan.
