= Gouri Kumar Brahma =

- Born: 20 February 1920; Prataplaxmanpur, Bhanjanagar, Ganjam
- Died: 29 September 2011 (aged 91)
- Education: Utkal University
- Occupations: Educationist, Writer
- Children: Debu Brahma, Dr. Mamata Brahma
- Writing career
- Language: Odia, Sanskrit
- Genres: Poetry Criticism, Interpretation, Prayers and devotions
- Subject: Odia culture
- Notable work: Jagannatha keertanam
- Notable awards: Sarala Samman, Orissa Sahitya Akademi

Gouri Kumar Brahma (20 February 1920 – 29 September 2011) was an academic, literary critic, orator and writer. His works are mainly in Odia and Sanskrit. He was popular for his talks on Jagannath culture and literature of Upendra Bhanja in Odia, English Sanskrit and Hindi. He died at Bhubaneswar.

== Early life and family ==
Gourikumar's father was Chandrasekhar Brahma and Mother was Savitri Devi. His birthplace was at Prataplaxmanpur village of Bhanjanagar. He got his early education in Ganjam district. He got his post graduate degree from Utkal University.While he was a student he studied classical literatures in Odia as well as Sanskrit such as Amarakosha, Kumara Sambhavam, Raghuvaṃśa, Meghadutam, Shishupala Vadha, Kirātārjunīya, Shiddhanta Darpana, Geeta Govinda, Bhagabata, Saptachandi. He was married to Satyabhama, daughter of Poet Godabarish Mohapatra.

== Career ==
He served as a teacher for some time at kazipur and Digapahandi. He worked as a lecturer in Odia. He also served as Odisha Sahitya Akademi, Odisha Sangita nataka Akademi and Odisha Lalitakala Akademi. He served as deputy Director of Department of Culture and Tourism, Government Of Odisha. he also served as chief tourism adviser to Government of Odisha. He retired as a Reader of Odia at Ravenshaw College. Throughout his career he wrote a number of critiques, interpretations on Odia literature such as on works of Upendra Bhanja, Abhimanyu Samanta Sinhara and others. He has been described as a "incomparable orator". He has been given epithets such as Purusha Saraswati, Sahitya Martanda, Kabi Kokila, Utkala Vachaspati.

== Awards ==
- Utkal Ratna, 2007
- Atibadi Jagannath Das Samman, 1998
- Odisha Sahitya Akademi Award
- Sarala Sammana

== Bibliography ==
- Brahma, Gourikumar (1963). Tapasvini o Mehera sahitya (in Odia). Odisa Buk Haus. OCLC 18753887.
- Saraladasa; Mahanty, Artavallabha; Brahma, Gourikumar (1965). Sarala Mahabharata (in Odia). OCLC 28007165.
- Brahma, Gourikumar (1967). Odia kabitara chanda (in Odia). OCLC 31063582.
- Brahma, Gourikumar (1969). Radhanathanka Usha (in Odia). Je. Mahapatra. ISBN 9788186942154. OCLC 46369579.
- Brahma, Gourikumar (1970). Chinta o chetana (in Odia). Brahma. ISBN 9788186942154. OCLC 18244513.
- Brahma, Gourikumar (1971). Sakuntala o Gangadhara (in Odia). Kataka shtudents shtora. ISBN 9788186942154. OCLC 46546467.
- Brahma, Gourikumar (1972). Bhanjanka nirbachana istahara (in Odia). Kataka shtudentsa shtora. ISBN 9788186942154. OCLC 46327127.
- Brahma, Gourikumar (1972). Gitara prathama sloka (in Odia). Sivakumara Brahma : Praptistana, Dharmagrantha Shtora, Kataka. ISBN 9788186942154. OCLC 18753827.
- Upendra Bhañja; Brahma, Gourikumar (1974). Baidehisa bilasa (in Odia). Paryyatana o Samskrtika Byapara Bibhaga, Odisa Sarakara. ISBN 9788186942154. OCLC 19171574.
- Simha Deo, Brajaraja; Brahma, Gourikumar; Panda, Bhagabana (1975). Brajaraja granthabali (in Odia). Rajya Paryyatana o Samskrtika Byapara Bibhaga Nirddesalaya. ISBN 9788186942154. OCLC 6914586.
- Brahma, Gourikumar (1975). Bhanja bhoomika (in Odia). Dharmagrantha Shtora. ISBN 9788186942154. OCLC 18599219.
- Brahma, Gourikumar (1976). Rasakollola samiksha (in Odia). Dharmagrantha Shtora. ISBN 9788186942154. OCLC 8668142.
- Brahma, Gourikumar (1976). Jagannathapuri dekhantu (in Odia). Debakumara Brahma. ISBN 9788186942154. OCLC 5334428.
- Brahma, Gourikumar (1978). Odia sahityare prakruti = Nature painting in Oriya literature (in Odia). Buks enda Buks. ISBN 9788186942154. OCLC 17334121.
- Brahma, Gourikumar (1988). Gopabandhu nakshatramaalaa (in Sanskrit). Brahma Prakasani. OCLC 21525133.
- Brahma, Gourikumar (1988). Bhanja-pañcasika (in Sanskrit). Brahma Prakasani. OCLC 21518123.
- Brahma, Gourikumar (1988). Mahatavanakstramala (in Sanskrit). Brahma Prakasani. OCLC 21525130.
- Brahma, Gourikumar (1989). Samskrta-gauravam (in Sanskrit). Brahmaa Publications. OCLC 21598928.
- Brahma, Gourikumar (1988). Mahatavanakstramala. Brahma Prakasani. OCLC 615010825.
- Brahma, Gourikumar (1989). Sishu-geetikaa (in Sanskrit and English). Brahmaa Publications. OCLC 21598899.
- Brahma, Gourikumar (1989). Bharata-samhatih (in Sanskrit and English). Brahmaa Publications. OCLC 21598860.
- Brahma, Gourikumar (1989). Bharata-gauravam (in Sanskrit). Brahma Prakasani. OCLC 21598880.
- Mahapatra, Godabarisa; Brahma, Gourikumar (1997). "Niamkhunta" patrikara pratishthata-sampadaka kabi Godabarisa racanabali (in Odia). Granthamandira. OCLC 37580102.
- Brahma, Gourikumar (1999). Srimadbhagabadgita (in Odia and Sanskrit). Satyanarayana Buk Shtora. ISBN 9788186942154. OCLC 45799288.
- Brahma, Gourikumar (2000). Odisa-paryatana-satakam : a Sanskrit poem of 100 verses on tourism in Orissa with annotations in English (in Sanskrit and English). Panchashila. ISBN 81-86942-15-7. OCLC 48266080.
- Brahma, Gourikumar (2003). Prakrti citranare Odisara kabibrunda (in Odia). Odisa Buk Shtora. ISBN 81-7400-403-3. OCLC 56367259.
