= Samanlıq =

- Municipality
- Location within Azerbaijan
- Coordinates: 40°44′N 45°47′E
- Country: Azerbaijan
- Rayon: Gadabay

Population
  - Total: 1,824
- Time zone: UTC+4 (AZT)
  - Summer (DST): UTC+5 (AZT)

Samanlıq (also, Samanlykh) is a village and municipality in the Gadabay Rayon of Azerbaijan. It has a population of 1,824. The municipality consists of the villages of Samanlıq, Moruxlu, and Rəmə.
