= Amada Bata =

1964 film

- Directed by: Amar Ganguly
- Written by: Basanta Kumari Patnaik
- Produced by: Babulal Doshi
- Starring: Sarat Pujari; Jharana Das; Umakant
- Cinematography: Deoji Bhai
- Music by: Balakrushna Dash
- Release date: 1964
- Running time: 144 minutes
- Country: India
- Language: Odia

Amada Bata (1964) (English The Untrodden Road) is a classic Odia film directed by Amar Ganguly based on eminent Odia woman writer of yester years Basanta Kumari Patnaik's novel masterpiece Amada Bata (1930), whose primary concern is the character Maya, before and after her marriage.

== Cast ==
- Jharana Das – Maya
- Umakant Mishra
- Akshya Mahanty
- Laxmipriya Mahapatra
- Krishanpriya Mahapatra
- Menaka
- Kiran
- Brundabana
- Gita Das- Kaberi

== Songs ==
- Jibana Jamuna Re
  - Lyric:Narayan Prasad Singh, Singer: Nirmala Mishra
