= Rabi Singh =

Indian Odia poet (1931–2020)

- Born: Rabindranath Singh; 27 January 1931; Sinharapur, Naba Patna, Jagatsinghpur
- Died: 2 February 2020 (aged 89); Cuttack
- Known for: Writer, journalist, politician
- Spouse: Bakul Singh
- Children: 3; 2 sons(Pinaki Singh),(Chandrajit Singh) (Died-September 19, 2022) 1 daughter(Manisha Singh)
- Parent(s): Ramachandra Singh; Sharada Debi
- Relatives: Purnendu Swain (Grandson), Subhasmita Singh (Granddaughter), Suchismita Singh (Granddaughter)
- Awards: Atibadi Jagannath Das award

Rabi Singh (27 January 1931 – 2 February 2020) was an Odia poet, writer. Author of more than 50 books, he was a journalist and prominent politician as well.

== Early life ==
He was born Rabindranath Singh on 27 January 1931 at Sinharapur village of undivided Cuttack district (now Jagatsinghpur). His parents were freedom fighters and he was involved in politics from an early age. He had little formal education but he was well versed in Odia, English and Bengali. In 1948 he joined Congress Socialist Party. Subsequently, in 1953 he joined Communist Party Of India. In 1955 he participated in Goa freedom movement. He was jailed during 1975 emergency.

== Literary activities ==
He started writing after 1955. He was known as a Marxist and revolutionary poet. His poems reflected the pain and suffering of the exploited masses. His poem collection Charamapatra (ଚରମପତ୍ର) was published before his marriage. For this he was awarded Odisha Sahitya Akademi award. He translated many Russian literary works to Odia.

== Awards ==
- Odisha Sahitya Akademi Award - 1968
- Soviet Land Nehru Award -
- Atibadi Jagannath Das Award - 2017

== Bibliography ==
Sources

- Sim, Rabi (1961). Carama patra (in Odia). Iunaited Buk Haus. OCLC 30990573.
- —— (1962). Sithila balga (in Odia). OCLC 31130495.
- —— (1962). Samasammayika Odia prema kabita (in Odia). Dasa Bradarsa. OCLC 19362710.
- —— (1963). Lal pagodara preta (in Odia). Dasa. OCLC 317982289.
- —— (1963). Bhrukuti. Rabindranatha Simha (in Odia). Sathi mahala. OCLC 20833193.
- —— (1964). Bidirna (in Odia). Sahitya Sadana. OCLC 31283736.
- —— (1966). Apritikara kabita (in Odia). Lunaited Buk Haus. OCLC 499115852.
- —— (1967). Jbalara Pala (in Odia). Bidyapuri. OCLC 499604538.
- —— (1968). Kshata (in Odia). Je. Mahapatra. OCLC 46362851.
- —— (1968). Bibidha (in Odia). Je. Mahapatra. OCLC 46327579.
- —— (1969). Bishabani (in Odia). Je. Mahapatra. OCLC 46362819.
- —— (1969). Odia sahityara dharshana (in Odia). OCLC 606895076.
- —— (1970). Pathaprantara kabita (in Odia). Je. Mahapatra. OCLC 46362858.
- ——; Misra, Manmohan (1971). Durgama giri (in Odia). Je. Mahapatra. OCLC 46362835.
- —— (1973). Jhada (in Odia). Je. Mahapatra. OCLC 18868271.
- —— (1974). Sarbahara (in Odia). Je. Mahapatra. OCLC 18469018.
- —— (1975). Padatika (in Odia). Iunaited Buk Haus. OCLC 499638635.
- —— (1977). Banya (in Odia). Je. Mahapatra. OCLC 19014066.
- —— (1977). Anaryyara caryyapada (in Odia). Je. Mahapatra. OCLC 17814363.
- —— (1987). Jamanabandi (in Odia). Grantha Mandira. OCLC 19457257.
- —— (1989). Kebala sangrama (in Odia). Bidyapuri. OCLC 22006550.
- —— (1991). Bhangahatara kabita (in Odia). Grantha Mandira. OCLC 25965278.
- —— (1991). Jhadagandhara (in Odia). Sathimahala. OCLC 29184456.
- —— (1992). Shtalinbadara bhuta bhaya o kamyunishta-kutsa (in Odia). Rabi Sim. OCLC 31755107.
- —— (1994). Nabamasvarga (in Odia). Granthamandira. OCLC 32467889.
- —— (1997). Rabi Simnka prema kabita (in Odia). Akshara. OCLC 39290750.
- —— (1998). Khasaa mukuta (in Odia). Praci Sahitya Pratishthana. OCLC 39811080.
- —— (1999). Rabi Sim ubaca (in Odia and English). Praci Sahitya Pratishthana. OCLC 45327053.
- —— (2000). E jhada se jhada nuhem (in Odia). Praci Sahitya Pratishthana. OCLC 47863340.
- —— (2000). Phungula pharddha (in Odia). Akshara. OCLC 49618650.
- —— (2001). Yacchata kabita (in Odia). Padatika. OCLC 51163641.
- —— (2002). Nirbacita nibandha (in Odia and English). Akshara. OCLC 51751621.
- —— (2011). Purbaparba : krantikari kabyayatra, 1959–1968 (in Odia). OCLC 849801392.

=== Autobiography ===
- —— (1985). Nihsanga padatika (in Odia). Odisa Buk Shtora. OCLC 14166028.

== See also ==
- List of Indian poets
- Odia literature
- Odia language
