= Raam =

Raam or RAAM may refer to:

- Rama, also known as "Raam", a deity in Hinduism
- Raam! The Man-Mountain, a 1972 unused Jack Kirby concept for a character meant to be the DC Comics mystical take on The Incredible Hulk
- Raam (2005 film), a 2005 Tamil film
- Raam (2006 film), a 2006 Telugu film
- Raam (2009 film), a 2009 Kannada language film
- Raam (currency), a local currency of the Global Country of World Peace in use in Vlodrop, Netherlands and Maharishi Vedic City, Iowa
- Raam (Southwest Papua), an island and a settlement in Southwest Papua, Indonesia
- Race Across America, a bicycle race
- Ra'am, a political party in Israel
- General RAAM, a character in Gears of War, a general of the locust horde

== People with the surname ==
- Villem Raam (1910–1996), Estonian art historian

== See also ==
- Rama (disambiguation)
- Remote Anti-Armor Mine System (RAAMS)
