= Ramchandra =

Ramchandra or Ram Chandra may refer to:

- Ram, ancient Indian king regarded as an incarnation of Vishnu
- Ramchandra Pant Amatya (1650–1716), Maratha Empire military leader, finance minister, regent and author of Adnyapatra, a royal edict
- Ramchandra Chandravanshi, Indian 21st century politician
- Ramchandra Gandhi (1937–2007), Indian philosopher
- Ram Chandra Poudel (born 1944), Nepalese politician and third president of Nepal
- Ram Chandra or Ramchandra Shukla (1884–1941), Indian historian of Hindi literature
- Ramchandra Singh Deo (1930–2018), Indian politician and author
- Ramchandra Siras (1948–2010), Indian linguist, academic and author
- C. Ramchandra (1918–1982), Bollywood music director and playback singer Ramchandra Narhar Chitalkar

== See also ==
- Ramachandra (disambiguation)
- Ramchundra (1821–1880), Indian mathematician
- Rama (disambiguation)
- Chandra (disambiguation)
