= Sriram (disambiguation) =

Sriram or Rama is a Hindu god.

Sriram may also refer to:

- Sriram Krishnan, Indian investor
- Sriram Raghavan, Indian director
- Sriram Chandra Bhanj Deo, Indian maharaja
- Sriram Sagar Project, dam in Telangana, India
- Sriram Balaji, Indian tennis player
- Sriram Parthasarathy, Indian musician
- Sriram, stage name of Srikanth, Indian actor

== See also ==
- Rama (disambiguation)
- Sri Ramulu (disambiguation)
