= Donga Ramudu =

Donga Ramudu may refer to:

- Donga Ramudu (1955 film), an Indian Telugu-language drama film
- Donga Ramudu (1988 film), a Telugu-language action film
