= Andala Ramudu =

Andala Ramudu is the name of the following Telugu films:

- Andala Ramudu (1973 film), a 1973 Telugu film starring Akkineni Nageshwara Rao directed by Bapu
- Andala Ramudu (2006 film), a 2006 Telugu film starring Sunil and Aarti Agarwal
