= Adavi Ramudu =

Adavi Ramudu may refer to:

- Adavi Ramudu (1977 film), a 1977 Telugu film directed by K. Raghavendra Rao and starring NTR, Jayaprada, and Jayasudha
- Adavi Ramudu (2004 film), a 2004 Telugu film directed by B. Gopal and starring Prabhas and Aarti Agarwal
