= Ramoth, Virginia =

Unincorporated community in Virginia, US

Coordinates: 38°25′19″N 77°28′10″W

Ramoth is an unincorporated community in Stafford County, in the U.S. state of Virginia.
