= Ramachandra (disambiguation) =

Ramachandra is the seventh avatar of the god Vishnu in Hinduism.

Ramachandra may also refer to:

== People ==
=== Given name ===
==== Rulers ====
- Ramachandra Deva I (1568–1607), Indian king, founder of the Bhoi dynasty of Khurda in Odisha
- Ramachandra of Devagiri (reigned c. 1271–1311), Indian king
- Ramachandra Vitthala Rao (1850–1892), Maharaja of the princely state of Sandur
- Ramachandra Raya (1367–1423), emperor of the Vijayanagara Empire
- Ramachandra Baba Sukthankar, 18th century diwan in the Maratha Empire
- Ramachandra Tondaiman (1829–1886), ruler of princely state of Pudukkottai

==== Other people ====
- S. Ramachandra (1948–2011), Shivaramaiah Ramachandra Aithal, Indian cinematographer
- Ramachandra Babu (1947–2019), Indian cinematographer
- Ramachandra Behera (born 1945), Indian Odia story writer, novelist, dramatist and lecturer
- Ramachandra Borcar, Canadian musician and composer
- Ramachandra Deva (1948–2013), Indian poet, writer and playwright
- V. R. Ramachandra Dikshitar (1896–1953), Indian historian
- Ramachandra Gowda (born 1938), Indian politician
- Ramachandra Guha (born 1958), Indian historian and economist
- S. Ramachandra Iyer (1901–?), Indian lawyer and judge, Chief Justice of the Madras High Court
- Ramachandra Khuntia (born 1953), Indian politician
- K. K. Ramachandra Pulavar (born 1960), Indian puppeteer
- Ramachandra Raju (born 1980), Indian actor
- M. S. Ramachandra Rao (judge) (born 1966), Indian judge, Chief Justice of Tripura High Court
- V. Ramachandra Reddy (1905–1986), Indian social activist and philanthropist
- Ramachandra Ulaka (1934–2011), Indian politician

=== Surname ===
- Chakravarthy Ramachandra (born 1978), Indian film producer
- Kanakanahalli Ramachandra (1933–2011), Indian mathematician
- Kotwal Ramachandra (died 1986), Indian gangster in Bangalore
- Phani Ramachandra (born 1956), Indian Kannada film and television director

== Other uses ==
- Ramachandra (film), a 2003 Indian Tamil-language action film
- A fictional alien spaceship in Rendezvous with Rama, a novel by Arthur C. Clarke

== See also ==
- Ramachandran plot, in biochemistry, a diagram visualization of protein angles
- Vilayanur S. Ramachandran (born 1951), Indian-American neurologist
- Ramchandra (disambiguation)
