= Rəmə =

Human settlement in Azerbaijan

Coordinates: 40°46′N 45°47′E

Rəmə is a village in the municipality of Samanlıq in the Gadabay Rayon of Azerbaijan.
