= Rama River =

Rama River may refer to:

- Rama (Neretva), a river in Bosnia and Herzegovina
- Rama (Escondido), a river in Nicaragua, tributary to Escondido
