= Moruxlu =

- Location within Azerbaijan
- Coordinates: 40°44′N 45°48′E
- Country: Azerbaijan
- Rayon: Gadabay
- Municipality: Samanlıq
- Time zone: UTC+4 (AZT)
  - Summer (DST): UTC+5 (AZT)

Moruxlu (also, Morukhlu) is a village in the Gadabay Rayon of Azerbaijan. The village forms part of the municipality of Samanlıq.

In 2000, it incorporated the nearby village of Tərs yer.
