= Radha Mohan Gadanayak =

Indian poet

- Born: 25 August 1911; Kalandapal, Angul, Odisha, India
- Died: 21 February 2000 (aged 88); Angul, Odisha, India
- Resting place: Swargadwar Puri
- Occupations: Writer; Poet
- Known for: Odia ballads
- Parent(s): Mahadeva Gadnayak; Golakamani Devi
- Awards: Padma Shri; Sahitya Akademi Award

Radha Mohan Gadanayak (1911–2000) was an Indian poet of Odia literature, known for his ballads and poetic creations. The poet, considered by many as one of the major Odia poets of this century, was a recipient of the Sahitya Akademi Award, which he received, in 1975, for his poem anthology, Surya O Andhakar. The Government of India awarded him the fourth highest civilian award of Padma Shri in 1990.

== Biography ==
Gadanayak was born in August 1911 in Kalandapal, a small village in the periphery of Angul town in the Indian state of Odisha, to Mahadeva Gadnayak and Golakamani Devi. He was involved with the Indian freedom struggle from an early age and became associated with the Satyagraha movement of Mahatma Gandhi at the age of 23. As a poet, he was more inclined to the genre of ballads and composed many ballads on various subjects and people such as Kalidasa and Mohandas Gandhi. His anthology, Surjya O Andhakara won him the Sahitya Akademi Award for Odia literature in 1975. He also translated Rubaiyat of Omar Khayyam into Odia language. Gopabandhu racanābaḷī, Gaḍanāẏaka granthābaḷī, Kāḷidāsa, Gāndhī gāthā, Kāḷindīcaraṇa parikramā, Hīrākhaṇḍara gāthā, Gopabaṅdhu racanābaḷī, Abācīra tārā and Paśupakshīra kābya are some of his other notable works.

Gadanayak died on 21 February 2000, at the age of 88, a decade after he was included by the Government of India in the 1990 Republic Day honours list for the civilian award of the Padma Shri. His poetry has been subjected to critical review and Gaḍanāẏaka abhinandana grantha, Kābyanāẏaka Gaḍanāẏaka, Rādhāmohana sṛshṭi samīkshā, Kabi Rādhāmohana Gaḍanāẏaka : kr̥ti o kr̥titva and Gaḍanāẏaka parikramā are some of the published studies. Seashore Sahitya Academy, a Bhubaneshwar based literary forum has set up a library, Radhamohan Gadanayak National Library, in his honour. His birth centenary was celebrated by Gadanayak Centenary Committee and other organizations. The committee, in association with Sarala Sahitya Sansad, has instituted an annual literary award, Kavi Radhamohan Gadanayak Centenary Award, in honour of the Odia balladeer.

== See also ==
- Godabarish Mishra
- Rubaiyat of Omar Khayyam
