= Srinibash Udgata =

Indian writer, translator

Srinivas Udgata
- Padma Shri Srinivas Udgata
- Born: 6 January 1935 (age 91); Balangir, Orissa, British India
- Occupations: Writer, Poet, Painter
- Spouse: Saudamini Udgata
- Writing career
- Language: Odia
- Notable awards: Padma Shri(2008), Sarala Award(2002), Bidhubhusan Guru Smruti Samman(2022), Sahitya Bharati Samman(2023), Atibadi Jagannath Das Puraskar(2023)

Srinivas Udgata (born 6 January 1935), is a poet, story and drama writer, painter, novelist and translator from Odisha, India.

== List of works ==
=== Books ===
- Purnima
- Parbati
- Dibya Purusha
- Kipari Kahibi Mu
- Ranipadra O' Anyanya Kahani
- Chhada Anchala Mahabahu
- Sei Subasita Atmati
- Khali Tharute
- Rutam (Collection of Poems)

=== Novels ===
- Nila Nayana Tale
- Kanta
- Sesha Ratrira Prathama Sakala
- Shilara Sapana
- Ahira Bhairaba
- Byaghrarohan
- Sesha Chitau
- Bhari Kathina se preeti paliba

== Awards and recognitions ==
He was awarded Padma Shri award in 2008 by the president of India in 2008 for Literature and Education. He received the Jhankar Award in 1974. In 2002 he received Bharati Bharati Award for his poetry from the Hindi Sahitya Sanstha of Uttar Pradesh. Besides these awards, he has also received the Sarala Award in 2002, Sarala Samman in 2002 and Acharya Vidyasagar Samman from Calcutta. He was honored with Bidhubhusan Guru Smruti Samman in 2022 by Bidhubhusan Guru Smruti Parishad. He received his D.Litt. from Sambalpur University. The title "Vidyavachaspati" awarded by Prayag Sahitya Sammelan, Allahabad, Award from Kendriya Sahitya Akademi, U.P. Hindi Sahitya Sansthan, Lucknow- Souhardya Samman etc. He was president of Orissa Sahitya Akademi from 1994 to 1997. He is continuing as president of Atmaprakashani (A Writers' Association). He has been awarded & honored by more than 100 organisations in India.
