= Sri Ramulu =

Sri Ramulu or Sreeramulu is an Indian (Telugu) name, a compound of the terms Shri and Rama. It may refer to:

- B. Sriramulu, Indian politician
- Potti Sreeramulu, an Indian revolutionary

== See also ==
- Sriram (disambiguation)
