= Sankhari =

Coordinates: 21.618932°N 87.433751°E

- Village
- Interactive map of Sankhari

Government
  - Type: Gram Panchayat

Sankhari is a village in Balasore district in the Indian State of Odisha.
