= Ramoth (Issachar) =

Ramoth was a Levite city in the Issachar territory, and is also called Remeth (Joshua 19:21) or Jarmuth (Joshua 10:3). According to Watch Tower literature, Ramoth is "tentatively identified" with Kokab el-Hawa, about 10km north of Beth-Shean, a city in northern Israel.
