= Baalath-Beer =

Ancient town in the Hebrew Bible

A town named Baalath-Beer is mentioned in the Masoretic Text of Joshua 19:8, which places near the end of a list of towns belonging to the Tribe of Simeon (19:1-9). Where the Masoretic Text reads "Baalath-beer Ramath-negeb", one version of the Septuagint reads "Baalath as you come to Ramath-negeb." It is unclear which is the earlier reading. For Ramath-negeb, various biblical translations render the Hebrew rmt ngb as "Ramah of the South", "Ramah in the Negev", "Ramah of the Negev", and so on.

Modern archaeologists have not agreed on whether the site of Baalath-Beer can be identified. The existing evidence is ambiguous as to whether or not Baalath-beer is the same town as Ramath-negeb, and Baalath-beer may be the same as the location referred to elsewhere as Baal.
