= Ramachandra Behera =

Odia writer

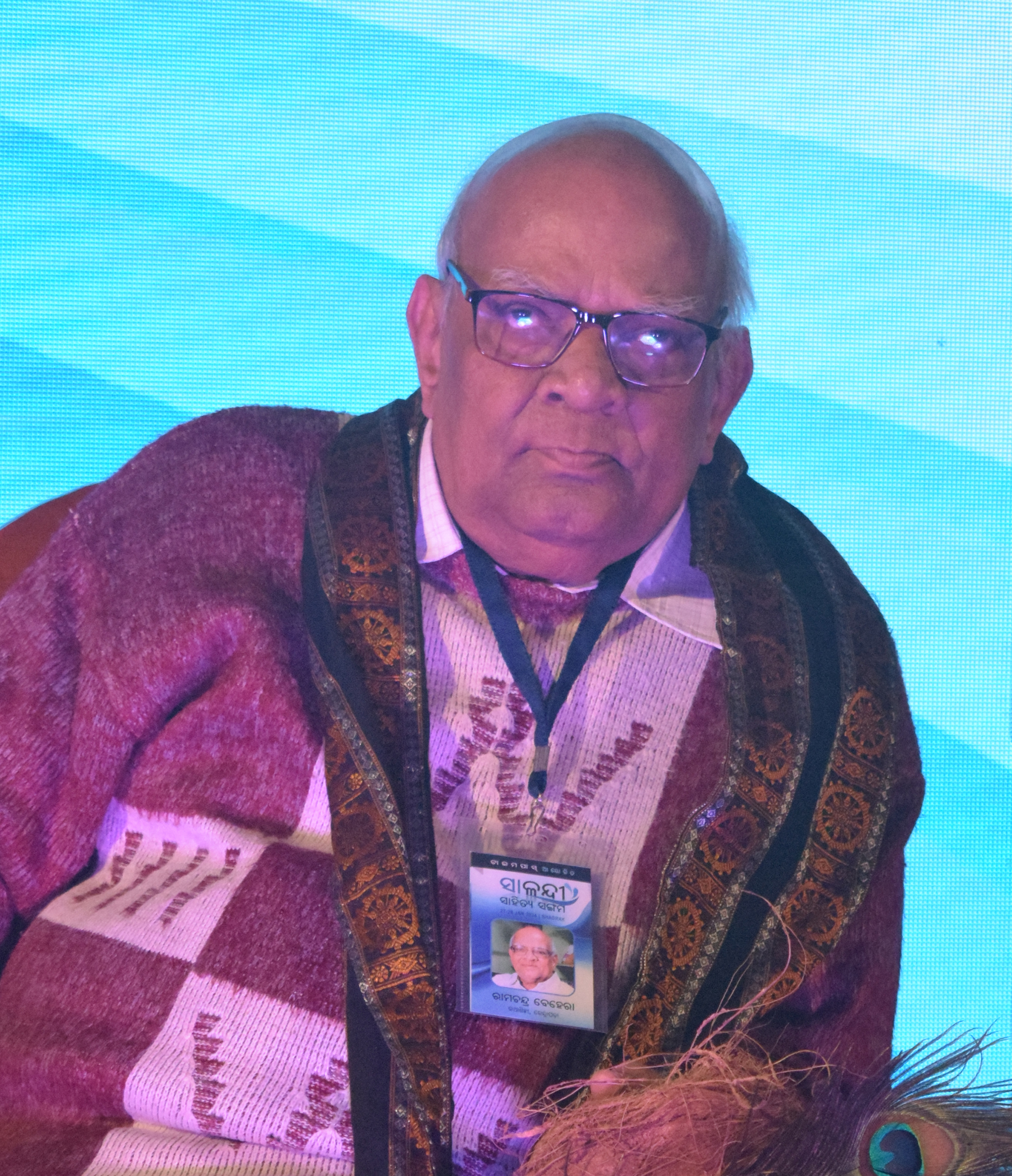
- Born: 2 November 1945; Barhatipura, Kendujhar district, Odisha
- Education: Ph.D.(English)
- Alma mater: Banaras Hindu University; Utkal University
- Occupations: Writer; lecturer
- Writing career
- Language: Odia
- Notable works: • Dwitiya Smasana • Abhinayara Paridhi • Gopapura
- Notable awards: • Central Sahitya Academy Award (2005) • Odisha Sahitya Academy Award (1993) • Atibadi Jagannath Samman (2020) • Sarala Samman (1991) • Bharatiya Bhasa Parishad Sadhana Samman (2009) • Vishuba Puraskar (2009)

Signature
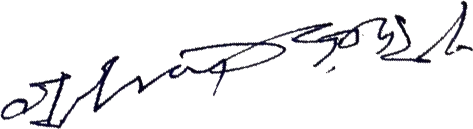

Ramachandra Behera (born 1945) is an Odia story writer, novelist, dramatist and lecturer. He received the state sahitya academy award for his novel "Abhinayara Paridhi" in 1993.

== Early life ==
Behera was born on 2 November 1945 at Bahartipura village near Ghatagaon, Kendujhar district, Odisha. He graduated from Ravenshaw College, Cuttack, M.A from Banaras Hindu University and Ph.D. (in English) from Utkal University. He joined as a lecturer in 1969 at Kendrapara college and retired as principal in 2005 and later he has been chaired the president of Odisha Sahitya Academy from 2010 to 2013.

== Works ==
Behera has written stories, novels and also some plays for All india Radio, Cuttack. His first collection of stories titled " Dwitiya Smasana" marked his arrival. After that his some other collection followed like, Omkar Dhwani, Asthai Thikana, Gopapura etc.

=== Publications ===
Year	Story	Language
1976	Dwitiya Smasana	Odia
1979	Achinha Pruthibi	Odia
1982	Abasista Ayusha	Odia
1987	Omkar Dhwani	Odia
1990	Banchi Rahiba	Odia
1993	Bhagnasara Swapna	Odia
1996	Mahakavya Muhan	Odia
2000	Phata Kanthara Gacha	Odia
2002	Ashthai Thikana	Odia
2003	Gopapura	Odia
2006	Sabujimara Paramayu	Odia
2008	Bada Mayabi Jiva	Odia
2008	Bata Baikuntha	Odia
2009	Sibanandara Gita	Odia
2012	Koti Bastra	Odia
2015	Biparjayara Thikana	Odia

=== Novels ===
Year	Story	Language
1991	Abhinayara Paridhi	Odia
1993	Muktira Ruparekha	Odia
1996	Dhusara Suryasta	Odia
1997	Mu Pheriasichi	Odia
2000	Manika Eve Kouthi	Odia
2000	Duaratapile Bata	Odia
2002	Kipari Niajaye Nispati	Odia
2003	Padatalara Mati	Odia
2006	Ratira Sesa Prustha	Odia
2009	Chinha Achinha	Odia
2009	Marichikara Mahaka	Odia
2009	Nikhoja Aparadhi	Odia
2012	Eithi Akasha	Odia

== Awards ==
Year	Award
1991	Sarala Puraskar
1993	Odisha Sahitya Academy Award
2005	Sahitya Academy Award
2009	Vishuba Puraskar
2009	Bharatiya Bhasa Parishad Sadhana Samman
2020	Atibadi Jagannath Samman
