= Highwayman =

Archaic term for mounted robber who steals from travellers

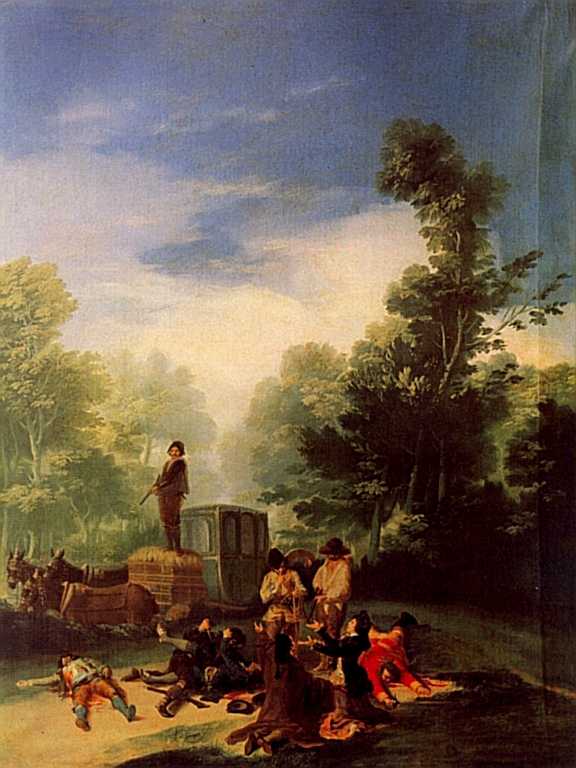
Asalto al coche (Attack on a Coach), by Francisco de Goya

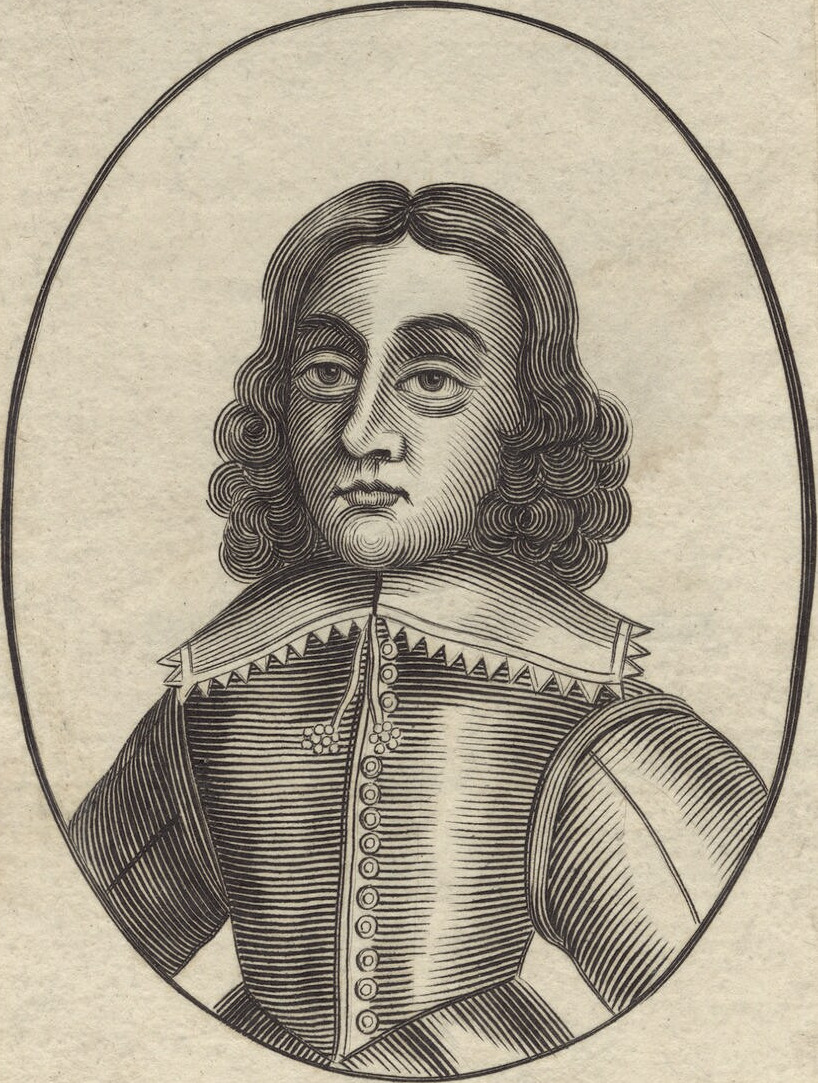
English highwayman James Hind depicted in an engraving now in the National Portrait Gallery

A highwayman was a robber who stole from travellers. This type of thief usually travelled and robbed by horse as compared to a footpad who travelled and robbed on foot; mounted highwaymen were widely considered to be socially superior to footpads. Such criminals operated until the mid- or late 19th century. Highwaywomen, such as Katherine Ferrers, were said to also exist, often dressing as men, especially in fiction.

The first attestation of the word highwayman is from 1617. In the 19th-century American West, highwaymen were sometimes known as road agents. In Australia, they were known as bushrangers, in India as Thugs.

== Robbery ==
Highwaymen were most prevalent in England from the Restoration in 1660 to the death of Queen Anne in 1714. Some are known to have been disbanded soldiers, and even officers, of the English Civil War and French wars. What favoured them most was the lack of governance and absence of a police force: parish constables were almost entirely ineffective, while detection and arrest were very difficult. Most of the highwaymen held up travellers and took their money. Some had channels by which they could dispose of bills of exchange. Others had a 'racket' on the road transport of an extensive district; carriers regularly paid them a ransom to go unmolested.

They often attacked coaches for their lack of protection, including public stagecoaches; the postboys who carried the mail were also frequently held up. The demand to "Stand and deliver!" (sometimes in forms such as "Stand and deliver your purse!" "Stand and deliver your money!") was in use from the 17th century to the 19th century:

A fellow of a good Name, but poor Condition, and worse Quality, was Convicted for laying an Embargo on a man whom he met on the Road, by bidding him Stand and Deliver, but to little purpose; for the Traveller had no more Money than a Capuchin, but told him, all the treasure he had was a pound of Tobacco, which he civilly surrendered.

— The Proceedings of the Old Bailey, 25 April 1677,

The phrase "Your money or your life!" is mentioned in trial reports from the mid-18th century:

Evidence of John Mawson: "As I was coming home, in company with Mr. Andrews, within two fields of the new road that is by the gate-house of Lord Baltimore, we were met by two men; they attacked us both: the man who attacked me I have never seen since. He clapped a bayonet to my breast, and said, with an oath, Your money, or your life! He had on a soldier's waistcoat and breeches. I put the bayonet aside, and gave him my silver, about three or four shillings."

— The Proceedings of the Old Bailey, 12 September 1781,

Victims of highwaymen included the Prime Minister Lord North, who wrote in 1774: "I was robbed last night as I expected, our loss was not great, but as the postilion did not stop immediately one of the two highwaymen fired at him (They had guns at the time) – It was at the end of Gunnersbury Lane." Horace Walpole, who was shot at in Hyde Park, wrote that "One is forced to travel, even at noon, as if one was going to battle." During this period, crime was rife and encounters with highwaymen could be bloody if the victim attempted to resist. The historian Roy Porter described the use of direct, physical action as a hallmark of public and political life: "From the rough-house of the crowd to the dragoons' musket volley, violence was as English as plum pudding. Force was used not just criminally, but as a matter of routine to achieve social and political goals, smudging hard-and-fast distinctions between the worlds of criminality and politics... Highwaymen were romanticized, with a hidden irony, as 'gentlemen of the road.'"

== Robbers as heroes ==
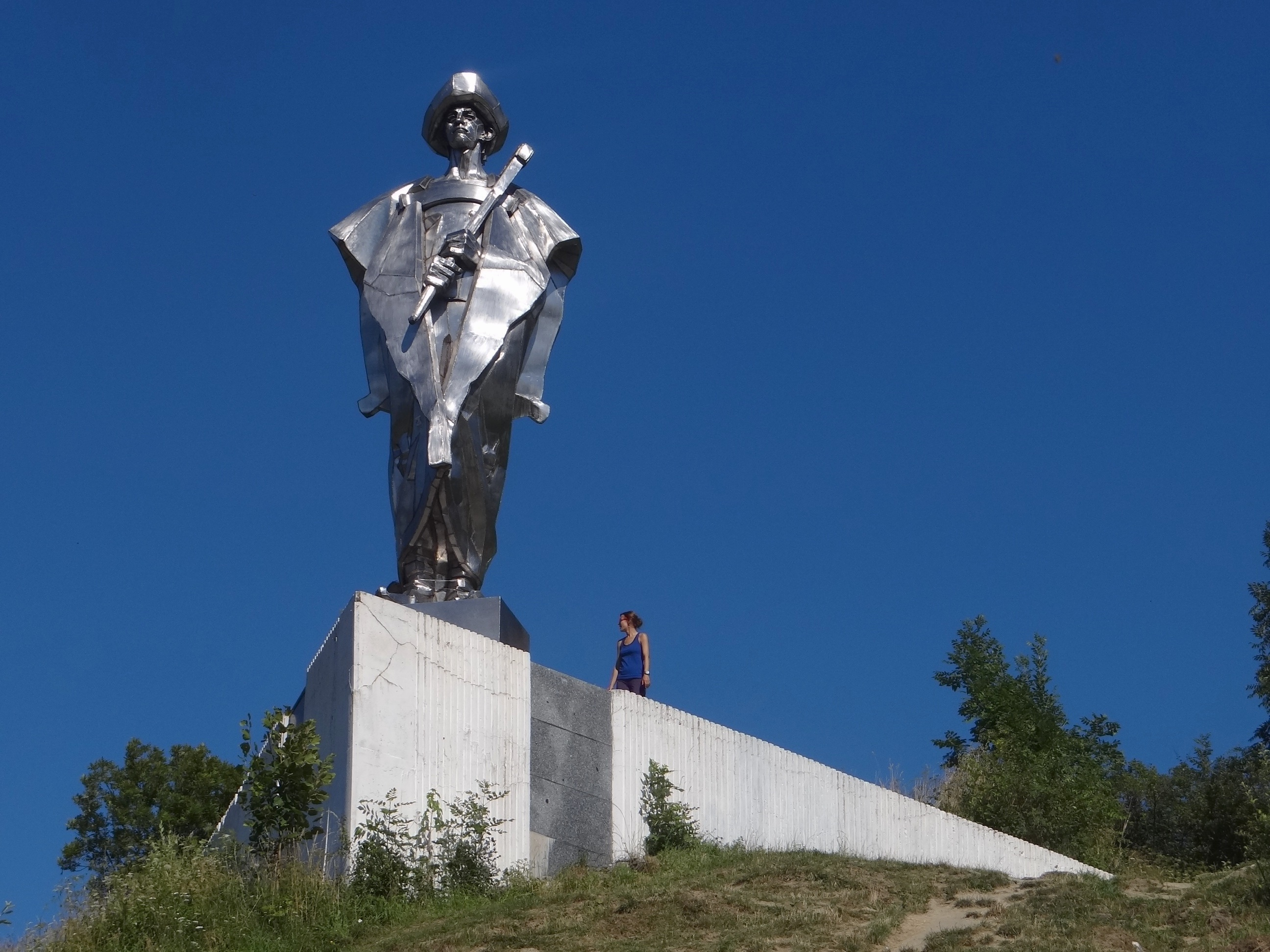
Statue of Juraj Jánošík at Terchová, Slovakia

There is a long history of treating highway robbers as heroes. They were admired by many as bold men who confronted their victims face to face and were ready to fight for what they wanted. Medieval outlaw Robin Hood is regarded as an English folk hero. Later robber heroes included the Cavalier highwayman James Hind; the French-born gentleman highwayman Claude Du Vall; John Nevison; Dick Turpin; Sixteen String Jack; William Plunkett and his partner, the "Gentleman Highwayman" James MacLaine; the Slovak Juraj Jánošík; the Ukrainian Oleksa Dovbush; and Indians including Kayamkulam Kochunni, Veerappan, and Phoolan Devi. In the same way, the Mexican bandit Joaquin Murrieta during the California Gold Rush and the Puerto Rican pirate Roberto Cofresí also came to be venerated as heroes.

In early modern Ireland, acts of robbery were often part of a tradition of Irish Catholic resistance to the Dublin Castle administration and Protestant Ascendancy. From the mid-17th century onwards, Catholic highwaymen who harassed the Crown and their supporters were known as 'tories' (from Irish tóraidhe, raider; tóraí in modern spelling). By the end of the century, they were also known as rapparees. Notable Irish highwaymen of the period included James Freney, Redmond O'Hanlon, Willy Brennan and Jeremiah Grant.

== Dangerous places ==
Travellers attacked by brigands on a Spanish Road, depicted in a painting by Charles Cooper Henderson

English highwaymen often laid in wait on the main roads radiating from London. They usually chose lonely areas of heathland or woodland. Hounslow Heath was a favourite haunt: it was crossed by the roads to Bath and Exeter. Bagshot Heath in Surrey was another dangerous place on the road to Exeter. One of the most notorious places in England was Shooter's Hill on the Great Dover Road. Finchley Common, on the Great North Road, was nearly as bad.

To the south of London, highwaymen sought to attack wealthy travellers on the roads leading to and from the Channel ports and aristocratic arenas like Epsom, which became a fashionable spa town in 1620, and Banstead Downs where horse races and sporting events became popular with the elite from 1625. Later in the 18th century, the road from London to Reigate and Brighton through Sutton attracted highwaymen. Commons and heaths considered to be dangerous included Blackheath, Putney Heath, Streatham Common, Mitcham Common, Thornton Heath – also the site of a gallows known as "Hangman's Acre" or "Gallows Green" – Sutton Common, Banstead Downs and Reigate Heath.

During the late 17th and early 18th centuries, highwaymen in Hyde Park were sufficiently common for King William III to have the route between St James's Palace and Kensington Palace (Rotten Row) lit at night with oil lamps as a precaution against them. This made it the first artificially lit highway in Britain.

== Executions ==
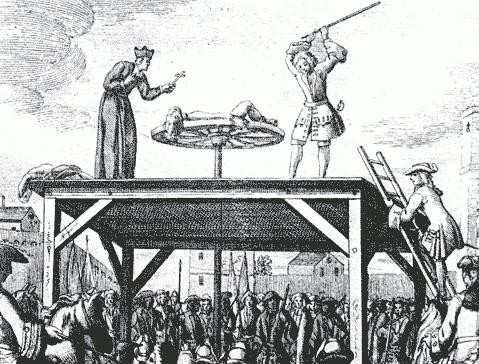
The execution of the French highwayman Cartouche, 1721

The penalty for robbery with violence was hanging, and most notorious English highwaymen ended on the gallows. The chief place of execution for London and Middlesex was Tyburn Tree. Highwaymen executed there include Claude Du Vall, James MacLaine, and Sixteen-string Jack. Highwaymen who went to the gallows laughing and joking, or at least showing no fear, are said to have been admired by many of the people who came to watch.

== Decline ==
During the 18th century, French rural roads were generally safer from highwaymen than those of England, an advantage credited by the historian Alexis de Tocqueville to the existence of a uniformed and disciplined mounted constabulary known as the Maréchaussée. In England this force was often confused with the regular army and as such cited as an instrument of royal tyranny not to be imitated.

In England, the causes of the decline are more controversial. After about 1815, mounted robbers are recorded only rarely, the last recorded robbery by a mounted highwayman having occurred in 1831. The decline in highwayman activity also occurred during the period in which repeating handguns, notably the pepper-box and the percussion revolver, became increasingly available and affordable to the average citizen. The development of the railways is sometimes cited as a factor, but highwaymen were already obsolete before the railway network was built. The expansion of the system of turnpikes, manned and gated toll-roads, made it all but impossible for a highwayman to escape notice while making his getaway, but he could easily avoid such systems and use other roads, almost all of which outside the cities were flanked by open country.

Cities such as London were becoming much better policed: in 1805 a body of mounted police began to patrol the districts around the city at night. London was growing rapidly, and some of the most dangerous open spaces near the city, such as Finchley Common, were being covered with buildings. However, this only moved the robbers' operating area further out, to the new exterior of an expanded city, and does not therefore explain decline. A greater use of banknotes, more traceable than gold coins, also made life more difficult for robbers, but the Inclosure Act 1773 was followed by a sharp decline in highway robberies; stone walls falling over the open range like a net, confined the escaping highwaymen to the roads themselves, which now had walls on both sides and were better patrolled. The dramatic population increase which began with the Industrial Revolution also meant, quite simply, that there were more eyes around, and the concept of remote place became a thing of the past in England.

== Outside Anglophone countries ==
=== Greece ===
The bandits in Greece under Ottoman rule were the Klephts (κλέφτες), Greeks who had taken refuge in the inaccessible mountains. The klephts, who acted as a guerilla force, were instrumental in the Greek War of Independence.

=== Kingdom of Hungary ===
The highwaymen of the 17th- to 19-century Kingdom of Hungary were the betyárs (Slovak: zbojník). Until the 1830s, they were mainly simply regarded as criminals but an increasing public appetite for betyar songs, ballads and stories gradually gave a romantic image to these armed and usually mounted robbers. Several of the betyárs have become legendary figures who in the public mind fought for social justice. Hungarian betyárs included Jóska Sobri, Márton Vidróczki, András Juhász, Bandi Angyal, Pista Sisa, Jóska Savanyú. Juraj Jánošík (Hungarian: Jánosik György), who was born and operated in Upper Hungary (now Slovakia), is still regarded as the Slovak version, and Sándor Rózsa the Hungarian version of Robin Hood in their regions.

The Hajduk (Hungarian: Hajdú) also originated in Hungary. They were formed from large numbers of Hungarians forced out of Syrmia and the Banates (Banate of Srebrenik, Banate of Nándorfehérvár, Banat of Macsó), moving upwards to central Hungary because of the Turkish attacks (they are replaced by the Serbs, Bosnians and Croats settling in the region). By the end of the 16th century, they had developed into a significant military force. They developed their own military organisation, separate from the ranks established in the country – they chose their own commanders, captains, lieutenants and corporals. Their rights were later taken away by the Austrians after the defeat of the Rákóczi's War of Independence, fearing their military power, they forced them into serfdom, so this was the end of the Hajduk golden age.

=== India ===
The Indian Subcontinent has had a long and documented history of organised robbery for millennia. These included the Thugs, a quasi-religious group that robbed travellers on Indian roads until the cult was systematically eradicated in the mid-1800s by British colonial administrators. Thugs would befriend large road caravans and gain their confidence, before strangling them to death and robbing their valuables. According to some estimates the Thugs murdered a million people between 1740 and 1840. More generally, armed bands known colloquially as "dacoits" have long wreaked havoc on many parts of the country. In recent times this has often served as a way to fund various regional and political insurgencies that includes the Maoist Naxalite movement. Kayamkulam Kochunni was also a famed highwayman who was active in Central Travancore in the early 19th century. Along with his close friend Ithikkarappkki from the nearby Ithikkara village, he is said to have stolen from the rich and given to the poor. With the help of an Ezhava warrior called Arattupuzha Velayudha Panicker, Kochunni was arrested and sent to Poojappura Central Jail. Legends of his works are compiled in folklore and are still read and heard today.

=== The Balkans and eastern Europe ===
The bandits in Serbia, Bosnia, Croatia and Bulgaria under Ottoman rule, and in Hungary were the Hajduks (Hajduci, Хајдуци, Хайдути) – rebels who opposed Ottoman rule and acted as a guerilla force, also instrumental in the many wars against the Ottomans, especially the Serbian revolution. Serbian and Croatian refugees in Austro-Hungarian (and Habsburg) lands were also part of the Uskoci. Notable freedom fighters include Starina Novak, a notable outlaw was Jovo Stanisavljević Čaruga. In medieval Wallachia, Moldavia, Transylvania and Ukraine, the Haiduks (Romanian – Haiduci, Ukrainian – Гайдуки, Haiduky) were bandits and deserters who lived in forests and robbed local Boyars or other travelers along roads. Sometimes they would help the poor peasants. In the 1800s, betyárs became common in Hungary.

== Literature and popular culture ==
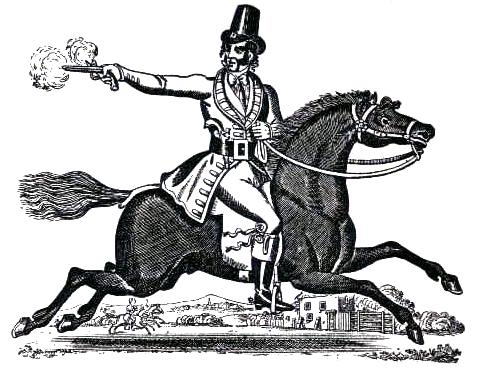
Dick Turpin riding Black Bess, from a Victorian toy theatre.

In Shakespeare's Henry IV, Part 1 Falstaff is a highwayman, and part of the action of the play concerns a robbery committed by him and his companions. Another highwayman in English drama is Captain Macheath, hero of John Gay's 18th-century ballad opera The Beggar's Opera. The legend of Dick Turpin was significantly boosted by Rookwood (1834), in which a heavily fictionalised Turpin is one of the main characters. Alfred Noyes's narrative poem "The Highwayman" has been immensely popular ever since its publication in 1906.

A number of traditional folk songs about highwaymen exist, both positive and negative, such as "Young Morgan", "Whiskey in the Jar", and "The Wild Colonial Boy".

From the early 18th century, collections of short stories of highwaymen and other notorious criminals became very popular. The earliest of these is Captain Alexander Smith's Complete History of the Lives and Robberies of the Most Notorious Highwaymen (1714). Some later collections of this type had the words The Newgate Calendar in their titles and this has become a general name for this kind of publication.

In the later 19th century, highwaymen such as Dick Turpin were the heroes of a number of penny dreadfuls, stories for boys published in serial form. In the 20th century the handsome highwayman became a stock character in historical love romances, including books by Baroness Orczy and Georgette Heyer.

Sir Walter Scott's romance The Heart of Midlothian (1818) recounts the heroine waylaid by highwaymen while travelling from Scotland to London.

Ronia, the Robber's Daughter (1981) is a children's fantasy book by Astrid Lindgren, which portrays the adventures of Ronia, the daughter of the leader of a gang of highwaymen.

=== Comics ===
The Belgian comics series Robin Dubois by Turk and De Groot is a gag-a-day series about Robin Hood's attempts at robbing travellers in the forest.

The Dutch comics series Gilles de Geus by Hanco Kolk and Peter de Wit was originally a gag-a-day about a failed highwayman called Gilles, but the character later evolved into a resistance fighter with the Geuzen against the Spanish army.

Ithikkara Pakki, a graphic children's story book about the Indian highwayman Ithikkara Pakki, was published in April 2010 in Malayalam. The life of the Indian highwayman Kayamkulam Kochunni was adapted as a comic by Radha M. Nair in the 794th issue of the Indian comic book series, Amar Chitra Katha.

=== Music ===
There were many broadsheet ballads about highwaymen; these were often written to be sold on the occasion of a famous robber's execution. A number of highwaymen ballads have remained current in oral tradition in England and Ireland.

The traditional Irish song "Whiskey in the Jar" tells the story of an Irish highwayman who robs an army captain and includes the lines "I first produced me pistol, then I drew me rapier. Said 'Stand and deliver, for you are a bold deceiver'." The hit single version recorded in 1973 by Irish rock band Thin Lizzy renders this last line "I said 'Stand-oh and deliver, or the devil he may take ya'."

The traditional Irish song "The Newry Highwayman" recounts the deeds and death of a highwayman who robbed "the lords and ladies bright". The traditional Irish song "Brennan on the Moor" describes an escapade of the "bold, undaunted robber". Adam and the Ants had a number one song for five weeks in 1981 in the UK with "Stand and Deliver". The video featured Adam Ant as an English highwayman.

The contemporary folk song "On the Road to Fairfax County" by David Massengill, recorded by The Roches and by Joan Baez, recounts a romantic encounter between a highwayman and his female victim. In the end, the highwayman is hanged over the objections of his victim.

Musician Jimmy Webb penned and recorded a song entitled "Highwayman" in 1977 about a soul with incarnations in four different places in time and history, a highwayman, a sailor, a construction worker on the Hoover Dam, and finally as a star ship captain. Glen Campbell recorded a version of the song in 1978, but the most popular incarnation of the song was recorded by Willie Nelson, Kris Kristofferson, Waylon Jennings and Johnny Cash in 1984, who as a group called themselves The Highwaymen.

The Canadian singer Loreena McKennit adapted the narrative poem, "The Highwayman" written by Alfred Noyes, as a song by the same title in her 1997 album The Book of Secrets.

=== Cinema and television ===
The Carry On films included a highwayman spoof in Carry On Dick (1974). Monty Python sent up the highwayman legends in the Dennis Moore sketch in Episode 37 of Monty Python's Flying Circus, in which John Cleese played the titular criminal who stole only lupins. In a linking sketch in an episode of Not the Nine O'Clock News a highwayman holds up a stagecoach with pistols – in order to wash the coach in exchange for small monies in the manner of a modern-day unsolicited car window washer in traffic. In Blackadder the Third, Mr. E. Blackadder turns highwayman in the episode "Amy and Amiability". In the British children's television series Dick Turpin, starring Richard O'Sullivan, the highwayman was depicted as an 18th-century Robin Hood figure. Additionally the actor Mathew Baynton played Dick Turpin in Horrible Histories. A singing highwayman appears in the fourth episode of the animated mini-series, Over the Garden Wall, Songs of the Dark Lantern.

The highwayman known as Juraj Jánošík (1688–1713) became a hero of many folk legends in the Slovak, Czech, and Polish cultures by the 19th century and hundreds of literary works about him have since been published. The first Slovak feature film was Jánošík, made in 1921, followed by seven more Slovak and Polish films about him.

Curro Jiménez, a Spanish TV series which aired from 1976 to 1979, starred a group of 19th-century highwaymen or bandoleros in the mountains of Ronda in the south of Spain.

Ronia, the Robber's Daughter (aka Ronja Robbersdaughter in the US) is a 1984 Swedish fantasy film, based on the 1981 novel of the same title by Astrid Lindgren, and narrating the adventures of Ronia, the daughter of the leader of a gang of highwaymen.

Ronja, the Robber's Daughter (Japanese: 山賊の娘ローニャ, Hepburn: Sanzoku no Musume Rōnya) is a Japanese animated television series, also based on Lindgren's novel Ronia, the Robber's Daughter, and directed and storyboarded by Gorō Miyazaki.

The lives of numerous Indian highwaymen including Arattupuzha Velayudha Panicker, Ithikkara Pakki, Jambulingam Nadar, Kayamkulam Kochunni and Papadu have been adapted for cinema and television multiple times.

Season two, episode 20, of Scooby-Doo! Mystery Incorporated, the main villain (voiced by James Marsters) disguises himself as a highwayman.

The animated series Over the Garden Wall features Jerron Paxton as a highwayman, including a short original song he composed in conjunction with The Blasting Company.

==== Films ====
- The Mark of Zorro (1920)
- Dick Turpin (1925)
- Dick Turpin (1933)
- The Adventures of Robin Hood (1938)
- The Night Riders (1939)
- Frontier Marshal (1939)
- My Little Chickadee (1940)
- Virginia City (1940)
- The Mark of Zorro (1940)
- The Wicked Lady (1945)
- The Loves of Carmen (1948)
- The Lady and the Bandit (1951)
- Bend of the River (1952)
- Son of Paleface (1952)
- The King's Thief (1955)
- The Amorous Adventures of Moll Flanders (1965)
- Kayamkulam Kochunni (1966)
- Butch Cassidy and the Sundance Kid (1969)
- Robin Hood (1973)
- Carry On Dick (1974)
- The Mark of Zorro (1974)
- Barry Lyndon (1975)
- Kaayamkulam Kochunniyude Makan (1976)
- Joseph Andrews (1977)
- Vellayani Paramu (1979)
- Ronia, the Robber's Daughter (1981)
- Jambulingam (1982)
- The Wicked Lady (1983)
- The Deceivers (1988)
- The Lady and the Highwayman (1989)
- Plunkett & Macleane (1999)
- Kayamkulam Kochunni (2018)
- The Highwaymen (2019)

=== Video games ===
In Fable II, Highwaymen appear as an elite type of enemy which works alongside bandits and makes use of speed and agility over brute strength. It is also possible for players to dress as Highwaymen. There is an enemy type in The Elder Scrolls V: Skyrim called the "bandit highwayman" that acts as one of the higher-level bandit enemies. In World of Warcraft one can encounter the Defias Highwaymen, the strongest members of the Defias Brotherhood. In Darkest Dungeon the Highwayman is a class of hero who wields a dirk and flintlock to fight. In Runescape, highwaymen attack lower-leveled players on a route between two cities. In Bushido Blade 2 there is a playable character named Highwayman who is dressed in Victorian clothing and represents the hero archetype. In Bloodborne many articles of clothing obtained by "The Hunter" are inspired by Highwaymen attire.

== See also ==
- List of highwaymen
- Brigandage
- Bushranger
- Dacoity
- Hajduk
- Mail robbery
- Marauder (disambiguation)
- Piracy
- Renegade Nell
- Road agent (disambiguation)
- Social bandits
- Thuggee
