= Kayamkulam Kochunni (disambiguation) =

Kayamkulam Kochunni was a famed Indian highwayman based in Kayamkulam in Travancore.

Kayamkulam Kochunni may also refer to:

- Kayamkulam Kochunni (1966 film), an Indian Malayalam-language film
- Kayamkulam Kochunni (2018 film), an Indian Malayalam-language film by Rosshan Andrrews
- Kayamkulam Kochunni (TV series), an Indian television series aired on Surya TV
- Kaayamkulam Kochunniyude Makan, an Indian Malayalam-language film by J. Sasikumar
- Kayamkulam Kochunniyude Makan (TV series), an Indian Malayalam-language television series
