= Outlaw (stock character) =

Stock character in several fictional settings

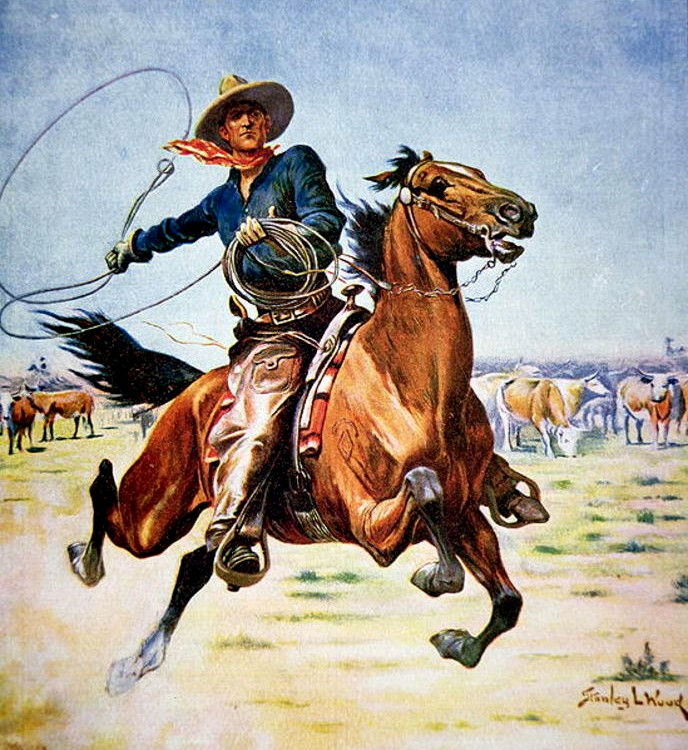

Romanticised outlaws are stock characters found in a number of fictional settings. This was particularly so in the United States, where outlaws were popular subjects of newspaper coverage and stories in the 19th century, and 20th century fiction and Western films. Thus, "outlaw" is still commonly used to mean those violating the law or, by extension, those living that lifestyle, whether actual criminals evading the law or those merely opposed to "law-and-order" notions of conformity and authority (such as the "outlaw country" music movement in the 1970s).

== Description ==
The colloquial sense of an outlaw as bandit or brigand is the subject of a monograph by British author Eric Hobsbawm: Hobsbawm's book discusses the bandit as a symbol, and mediated idea, and many of the outlaws he refers to, such as Ned Kelly, Mr. Dick Turpin, and Billy the Kid, are also listed below.

The point about social bandits is that they are peasant outlaws whom the lord and state regard as criminals, but who remain within peasant society, and are considered by their people as heroes, as champions, avengers, fighters for justice, perhaps even leaders of liberation, and in any case as men to be admired, helped and supported. This relation between the ordinary peasant and the rebel, outlaw and robber is what makes social banditry interesting and significant ... Social banditry of this kind is one of the most universal social phenomena known to history.

— Eric Hobsbawm

== List of famous outlaws ==
The stereotype owes a great deal to English folklore precedents, in the tales of Robin Hood and of gallant highwaymen. But outlawry was once a term of art in the law, and one of the harshest judgments that could be pronounced on anyone's head.

=== American ===
==== American Western ====
The outlaw is familiar to contemporary readers as an archetype in Western films, depicting the lawless expansionism period of the United States in the late 19th century. The Western outlaw is typically a criminal who operates from a base in the wilderness, and opposes, attacks or disrupts the fragile institutions of new settlements. By the time of the Western frontier, many jurisdictions had abolished the process of outlawry, and the term was used in its more popular meaning. Some Old West outlaws, such as Billy the Kid and Jesse James, became legendary figures in Western lore both in their own lifetime and long after their deaths.

==== Argentinian ====
- Juan Bautista Bailoretto
- Juan Moreira
- Mate Cocido (Segundo David Peralta)

==== Brazilian ====
Cangaceiros

- Lampião – Brazilian outlaw who led the Cangaços, a band of feared marauders and outlaws who terrorized Northeastern Brazil during the 1920–1930's.

==== Canadian ====
- Simon Gunanoot
- Slumach
- Bill Miner
- Ken Leishman – In 1966 he managed to hijack $383,497 worth of gold from the Winnipeg International Airport, amounting to the largest gold heist in Canadian history.

==== Mexican ====
- Doroteo Arango Arámbula – Better known as Pancho Villa, a general in the Mexican Revolution
- Heraclio Bernal, also known as the "Thunderbolt of Sinaloa"
- Los Plateados, a famous Mexican gang that was active in the state of Morelos in the 19th century.
- Joaquín Murrieta, symbolized resistance against Anglo-American economic and cultural domination in the 19th century.

==== Panamanian ====
- Derienni

=== European ===
==== British ====
- Robin Hood – Legendary medieval English outlaw
- Hereward the Wake – Saxon outlaw during the Norman conquest of England
- John Nevison – 17th-century highwayman
- William Plunkett – English highwayman
- Tom King – fictional English highwayman
- Edgar the Outlaw – English king
- Eustace Folville – English outlaw and soldier
- Adam the Leper – 14th-century English gang leader
- James Hind – 17th-century highwayman
- John Clavell – English highwayman, author, and lawyer
- Claude Duval – French-born highwayman in England
- John Wilkes – 18th-century English politician
- Twm Siôn Cati – Welsh outlaw from Tregaron in Tudor times, ended up mayor of Brecon
- William Wallace – Scottish outlaw
- James MacLaine – Scottish highwayman
- Sawney Beane – Scottish outlaw
- The Outlaw Murray – The Outlaw of Ettrick Forest in the Scottish Borders
- Rob Roy MacGregor – Scottish chieftain

==== Croatian ====
Hajduci

- Mijat Tomić
- Andrijica Šimić

==== Czech/Slovak ====
- Juraj Jánošík
- Rumcajs

==== French ====
- Louis Dominique Bourguignon, also known as Cartouche

==== German ====
- Eppelein von Gailingen
- Frederick of Isenberg
- Hannikel
- Johannes Bückler, nicknamed Schinderhannes
- Matthias Klostermayr, a.k.a. Bavarian Hiasl, a.k.a. Hiasl of Bavaria, a.k.a. der Bayerische Hiasl, a.k.a. da Boarische Hiasl
- Mathias Kneißl
- Hans Kohlhase

==== Greek ====
Klephtes

- Odysseas Androutsos
- Markos Botsaris
- Athanasios Diakos
- Geórgios Karaïskákis
- Theodoros Kolokotronis
- Nikitaras

==== Hungarian ====
- Rózsa Sándor (the most famous Hungarian highwayman)

==== Icelandic ====
- Gísli Súrsson
- Grettir Ásmundarson

==== Irish ====
- Grace O'Malley
- Redmond O'Hanlon
- Neesy O'Haughan
- Tiger Roche
- Captain Gallagher
- Thomas Blood – outlaw and attempted thief of the Crown Jewels

==== Italian ====
- Carmine Crocco (1830–1905) – Lucanian bandit and folk hero
- Salvatore Giuliano (1922–1950) – Sicilian bandit and separatist
- Giuseppe Musolino (1876–1956) – Calabrian outlaw and folk hero
- Ninco Nanco (1833–1864) – Lucanian bandit
- Nicola Napolitano (1838–1863) – Campanian bandit
- Gaspare Pisciotta (1924–1954) – Sicilian bandit and separatist
- Francesco Paolo Varsallona – Sicilian bandit leader

==== Norwegian ====
- Erik the Red

==== Polish ====
- Slovak bandit Juraj Jánošík is known in Polish folklore as Janiczek or Janicek

==== Serbian ====
- Jovo Stanisavljevic Caruga, Serb

==== Spanish ====
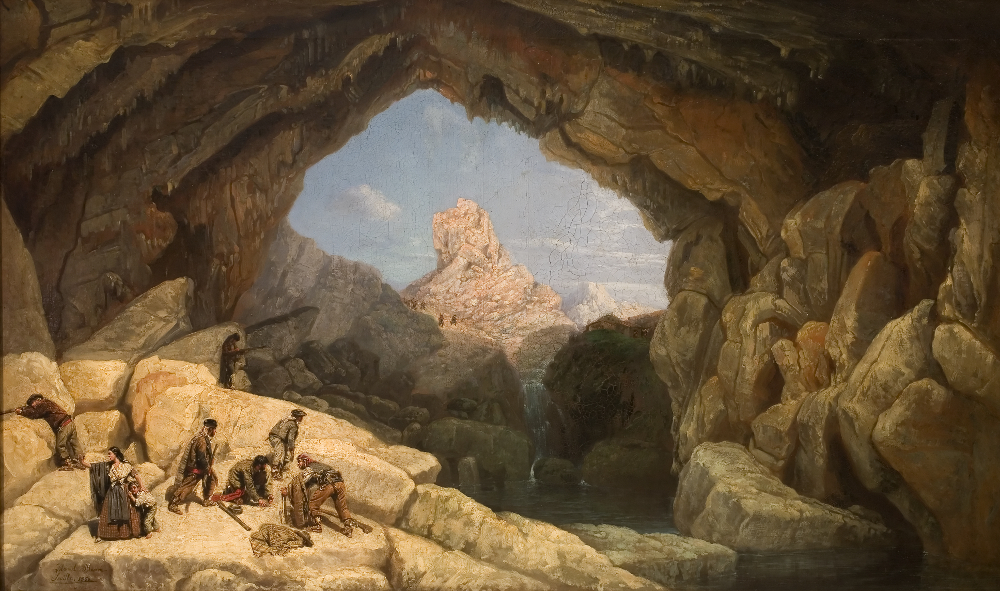
La cueva del Gato (The cave of the Cat), 1860 painting by Manuel Barrón y Carrillo depicting the hideout of the Andalusian bandolero of Spain

- Diego Corrientes Mateos Andalusian (1757–1781)
- El Guapo Andalusian (born 1546) who is reputed to be the source for part one chapter 22 of Don Quixote by Cervantes.
- Eleuterio Sánchez Rodríguez (born April 15, 1942), known as El Lute, was at one time listed as Spain's "Most Wanted" criminal and later became a published writer.

==== Others ====
- Tadas Blinda, in Lithuania
- Juraj Jánošík, in Slovakia
- Johann Georg Grasel, in Moravia
- Andrij Savka, in Lemko Region; defender of the Lemkos against Polish and Hungarian nobility

=== Asians/Oceanian ===
==== Australian ====
In Australia two gangs of bushrangers have been made outlaws – that is they were declared to have no legal rights and anybody was empowered to shoot them without the need for an arrest followed by a trial.

- Ben Hall – the New South Wales colonial government passed a law in 1865 which outlawed the gang (Hall, John Gilbert and John Dunn) and made it possible for anyone to shoot them. There was no need for the outlaws to be arrested and for there to be a trial — the law was essentially a bill of attainder.
- Ned Kelly – The Victorian colonial government passed a law on October 30, 1878, to make the Kelly gang outlaws: they no longer had any legal rights and they could be shot by anyone. The law was modelled on the 1865 legislation passed against the gang of Ben Hall. As well as Ned Kelly, his brother Dan Kelly was subject to the warrant as well as Joe Byrne and Steve Hart.

==== East Asian ====
- Song Jiang – Historical Chinese outlaw immortalised in the classic Water Margin
- Zhang Xianzhong – nicknamed Yellow Tiger, was a Chinese bandit and rebel leader who conquered Sichuan Province in the middle of the 17th century.
- Zhang Haitian – known as Lao Beifeng (Old North Wind), was a bandit chieftain in western Liaoning.
- Wang Delin – bandit, soldier and leader of the National Salvation Army resisting the Japanese pacification of Manchukuo.
- Hong Gildong – Fictitious Korean outlaw
- Ishikawa Goemon – Legendary Japanese thief featured in kabuki plays
- Nezumi Kozō – Japanese thief
- Saigō Takamori – the last true Samurai, he led the Satsuma Rebellion
- Captain Harlock – protagonist of Space Pirate Captain Harlock

==== Indian ====
- Dulla Bhatti – was a Punjabi who led a rebellion against the Mughal emperor Akbar. His act of helping a poor peasant's daughter to get married led to a famous folk take which is still recited every year on the festival of Lohri by Punjabis.
- Papadu – South Indian bandit.
- Veerappan, South India's most famous bandit, Elephant poacher, sandalwood smuggler
- Phoolan Devi – one of India's most famous dacoits ("armed robber").
- Saradiel – Known as the Robin Hood of Sri Lanka for his exploits under British Colonial rule.
- Shiv Kumar Patel – led one of the few remaining bands of outlaws that have roamed central India for centuries.
- Thuggee – Indian network of secret fraternities engaged in murdering and robbing travellers.

°Kayamkulam Kochunni a heroic outlaw from Kayamkulam who lived during the late 19th century. He was active in the Travancore area in the present-day Kerala, India. He is said to have stolen from the rich and given to the poor. Legends on his life are part of the folklore of Keralam.

==== Middle East ====
- Hashshashin – militant Ismaili Muslim sect, active from the 8th to the 14th centuries.
- Simko Shikak – Kurdish bandit and rebel leader.

==== Russian ====
- Nightingale the Robber – myth
- Yermak Timofeyevich – 16th century Cossack outlaw and explorer
- Stenka Razin – Cossack leader
- Yemelyan Pugachov – pretender to the Russian throne

==== Turkish ====
- İnce Memed, a fictional character in novels by Yaşar Kemal
- Atçalı Kel Mehmet Efe, an outlaw who led a local revolt against Ottoman Empire
- Çakırcalı Mehmet Efe, a powerful outlaw of late Ottoman era

==== Ukrainian ====
- Oleksa Dovbush
- Ustym Karmaliuk

== In other media ==
UK-based alt-rock band, Guild Theory's debut album contains a song called Outlaws, which depicts a group of thieves on the run from the law.
