= Slavné historky zbojnické =

- Directed by: Hynek Bočan
- Starring: Miloš Kopecký
- Country of origin: Czechoslovakia
- Original language: Czech
- No. of seasons: 1
- No. of episodes: 6

Production
- Running time: 59 minutes

Original release
- Network: Czechoslovak Television
- Release: 1986 – 1988

Slavné historky zbojnické (Famous Bandit Stories) is a Czechoslovak adventure historical television series filmed in 1985. Six 59 minute episodes were filmed. The series was directed by Hynek Bočan.

Every episode tells a story of famous bandit. It shows harsh reality of bandit life. Every episode started with the narrator introducing the main character's personality to the audience.

== Cast ==
- Miloš Kopecký (narrator)
- Radoslav Brzobohatý as Václav Babinský (episode 1)
- Jana Hlaváčová as Charita (episode 1)
- Jiří Bartoška as Šobri Jožka (episode 2)
- Karel Heřmánek as Count Lužanský (episode 2)
- Ivan Vyskočil as Jan Jiří Grasel (episode 3)
- Jaromír Hanzlík as David Majer (episode 3)
- Miroslav Vladyka as Schinderhannes (episode 4)
- Pavel Zedníček as Róža Šándor (episode 5)
- Vladimír Dlouhý as Jean Ferey (episode 6)

== Episodes ==
The names of the episodes are also the names of the bandit main characters. The actor who portrayed the main character is listed in parentheses.

1. Václav Babinský, premiered on 18 October 1986
2. Šobri Jožka, premiere on 19 July 1986
3. Jan Jiří Grasel, premiered on 17 October 1987
4. Schinderhannes, premiered on 9 July 1988
5. Róža Šándor, premiered on 18 June 1988
6. Trestanec Salvador, premiered on 8 March 1986

The listed order has only stabilized since the replay in 1997.
