= Ithikkara Pakki =

19th century Indian outlaw

- Born: Muhammad Abdul Khader; Umayanalloor, Kollam, Kingdom of Travancore, British India
- Died: At age 45
- Resting place: Kottumpuram Juma Masjid, Mylakkadu, Kollam district
- Occupations: Brigand; highwayman
- Known for: Stealing from the rich and giving to the poor

Ithikkara Pakki (or Ithikkara Pakky / Ethikkara Pakki / Ethikkara Pakky) was an Indian outlaw who lived in the Travancore Kingdom in the 19th century. He is said to have plundered from the rich and distributed to the poor. Pakki, whose real name was Muhammad Abdul Khader, hails from Ithikkara village. He is said to have moved as swiftly as a bird or butterfly, meaning Pakki in Malayalam, hence he was known by the name Ithikkara Pakki.

Legends on him are part of the folklore of Kerala where he is represented as a heroic outlaw. Stories about him often include his friend and fellow bandit Kayamkulam Kochunni. Ithikkara Pakki is depicted in various films, television and literature.

== History ==
Pakki was born to a fisherman, in Umayanalloor, Kollam in Kingdom of Travancore (present-day Kerala), British India. He was raised in Ithikkara village on the shore of Ithikkara River. He was skilled in water sports from childhood and is said to have saved many from drowning. Pakki began stealing due to the prevailing social structure, as the country was under British rule. Farmers and the lower class were treated poorly. They were discriminated against, denied rightful wages and paid high taxes, levied by the landlords and ruling officials. Pakki stole from them and gave to the poor. It is said that the police never captured him. Pakki died of cancer at age 45. His remains were buried at the Kottumpuram Juma Masjid in Mylakkadu, Kollam district.

== Pop culture ==
- Vellayani Paramu, a 1979 Malayalam film, M. G. Soman portrayed Pakki.
- Pakki was a character in the TV serial Kayamkulam Kochunni aired on Surya TV.
- Ithikkara Pakki, a graphic children's story book was published in April 2010.
- Pakki was portrayed by Mohanlal in the 2018 Malayalam film Kayamkulam Kochunni.
- TV series of the same title was aired on Surya TV in 2020.

== See also ==
- Robin Hood
- Kayamkulam Kochunni
- Mulamoottil Adima
- Vellayani Paramu
- Jambulingam Nadar
