= Herding =

Act of bringing individual animals together in a group

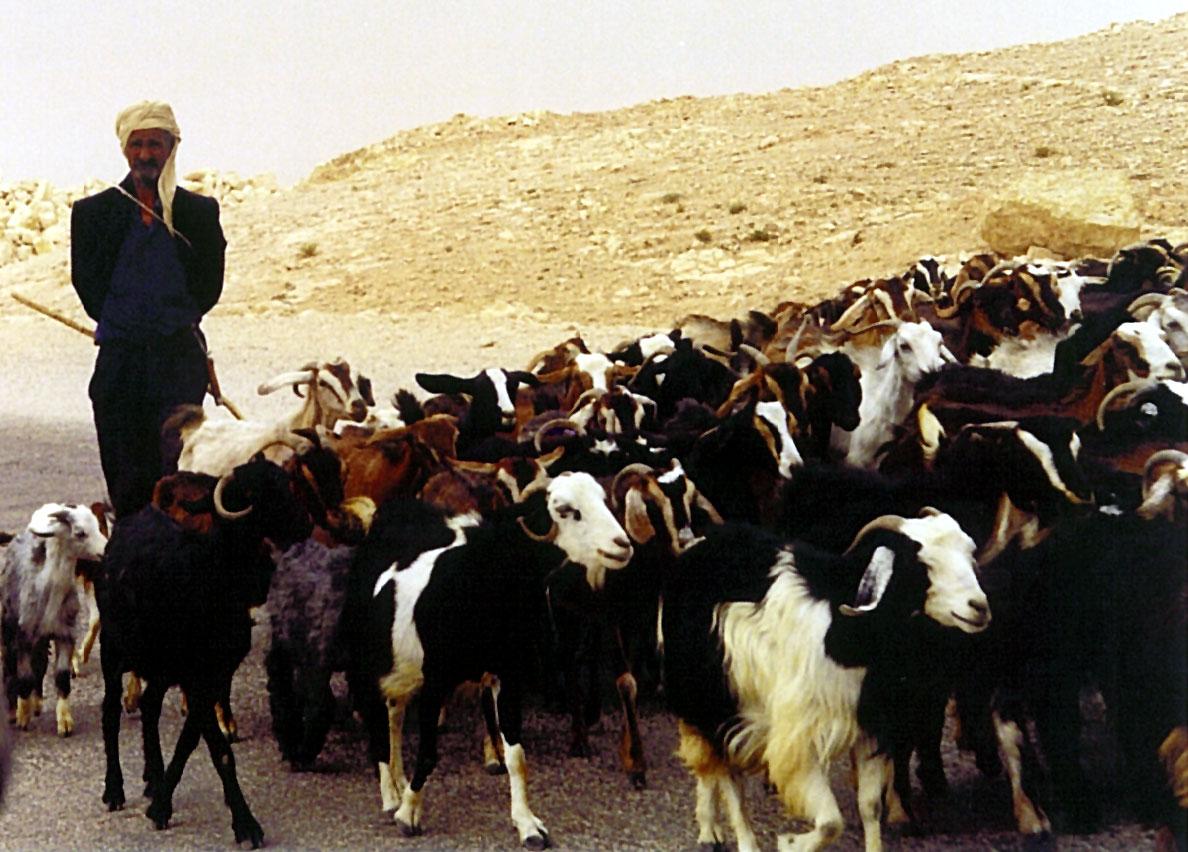
A man herding goats in Tunisia

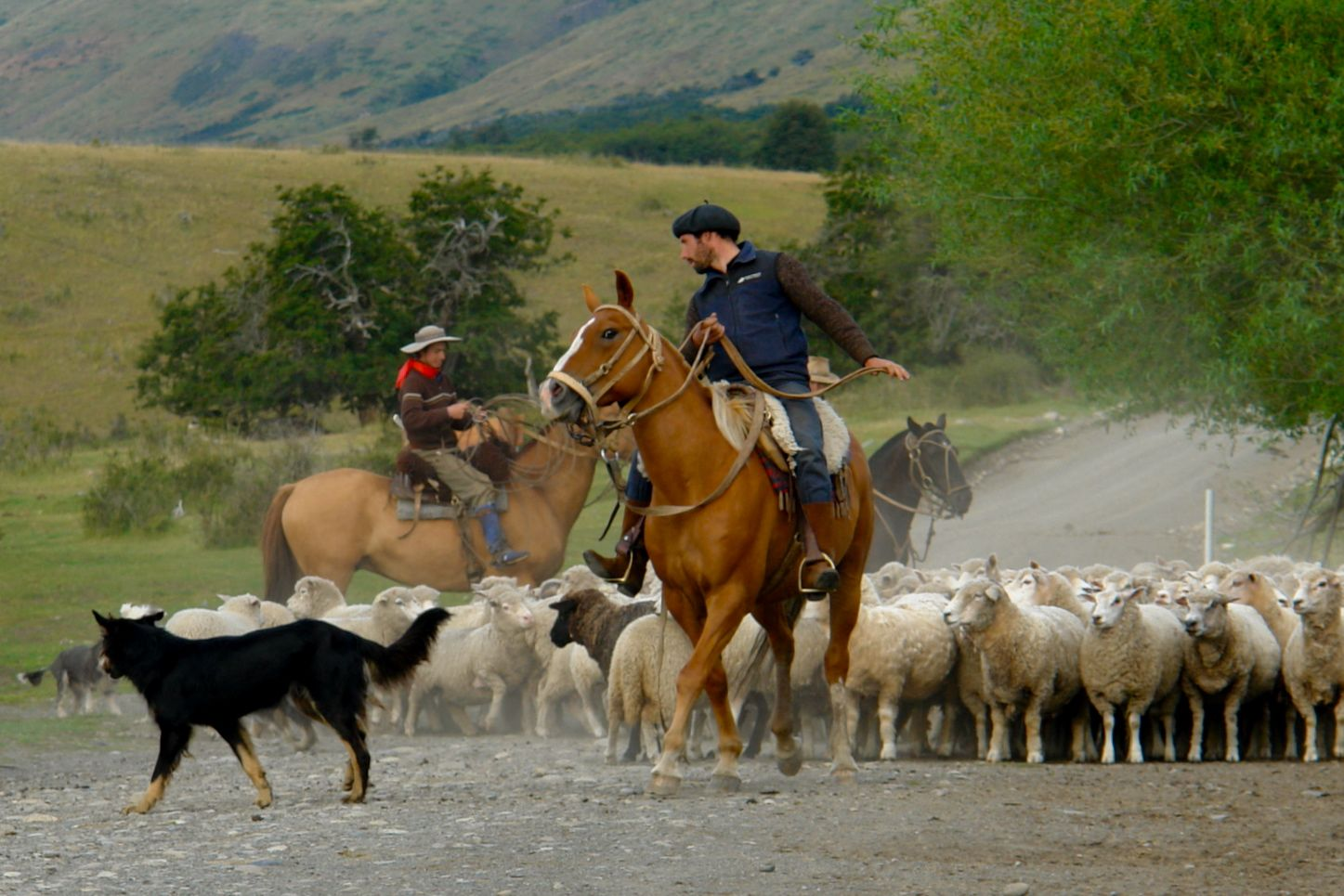
Shepherd herding sheep in Patagonia, Argentina

Herding is the act of bringing individual animals together into a group (herd), maintaining the group, and moving the group from place to place—or any combination of those. Herding can refer either to the process of animals forming herds in the wild, or to human intervention forming herds for some purpose. While the layperson uses the term "herding" to describe this human intervention, most individuals involved in the process term it mustering, "working stock", or droving.

A herder or herdsman is a pastoral worker responsible for herding, i.e., the care and management of a herd or flock of domestic animals, usually on open pasture. It is particularly associated with nomadic or transhumant management of stock, or with common land grazing. The work is often done either on foot or mounted. Depending on the type of animal being herded, the English language can give different professional names, for example, cowboy for cows, shepherd for sheep, or goatherd for goat.

Herding is used in agriculture to manage domesticated animals. Herding can be performed by people or trained animals such as herding dogs that control the movement of livestock under the direction of a person. A competitive sport has developed in some countries where the combined skill of man and herding dog is tested and judged in a "trial", such as a sheepdog trial. Animals such as sheep, camel, yak, and goats are mostly reared. They provide milk, meat and other products to the herders and their families.

== By country ==
=== China ===
Tibetan herding communities living in the Tibetan Plateau in the Sichuan Province of southwest China continued to graze herds on common lands even after the 1982 Household responsibility system. Several reasons have been given for the endurance of the traditional pastoral lifestyle:

- complex topography prevents the division of common grazing lands among individual households
- yaks require free grazing and become ill in fenced pasture
- rotation of grazing spots

Grassland degradation has been an issue. Herding communities and their leaders have taken steps to reach a consensus about sustainable grazing practices. These include developing the community political organization to enforce commitments to seasonal rotational grazing.

== By livestock type ==
=== Cows ===
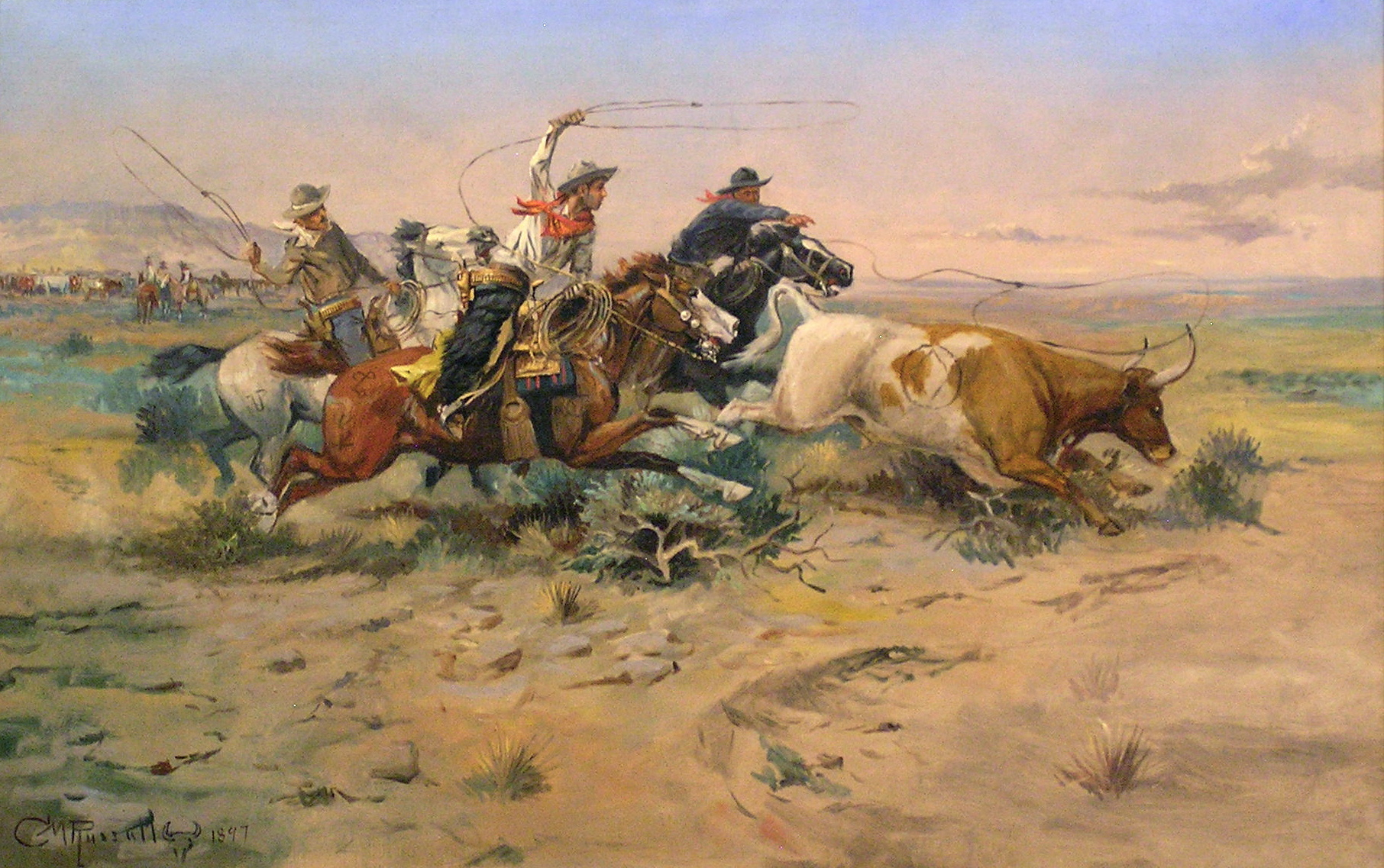
Cowboys portrayed in Western art. The Herd Quitter by C. M. Russell

A cowboy is an animal herder who tends cattle on ranches in North America, traditionally on horseback, and often performs a multitude of other ranch-related tasks. The historic American cowboy of the late 19th century arose from the vaquero traditions of northern Mexico and became a figure of special significance and legend. A subtype, called a wrangler, specifically tends the horses used to work cattle. In addition to ranch work, some cowboys work for or participate in rodeos. Cowgirls, first defined as such in the late 19th century, had a less-well documented historical role, but in the modern world work at identical tasks and have obtained considerable respect for their achievements. Cattle handlers in many other parts of the world, particularly South America and Australia, perform work similar to the cowboy. The cowboy has deep historic roots tracing back to Spain and the earliest European settlers of the Americas. Over the centuries, differences in terrain and climate, and the influence of cattle-handling traditions from multiple cultures, created several distinct styles of equipment, clothing and animal handling. As the ever-practical cowboy adapted to the modern world, his equipment and techniques also adapted, though many classic traditions are preserved.

There are numerous regional types of cow herder, many with a specific name; these include the stockman of Australia, the buttero, campino, csikós, gardian and gulyás in Europe, the buckaroo, charro, cowboy and vaquero in North America, and the gaucho, huaso, llanero, morochuco and qorilazo of South America.

=== Goats ===
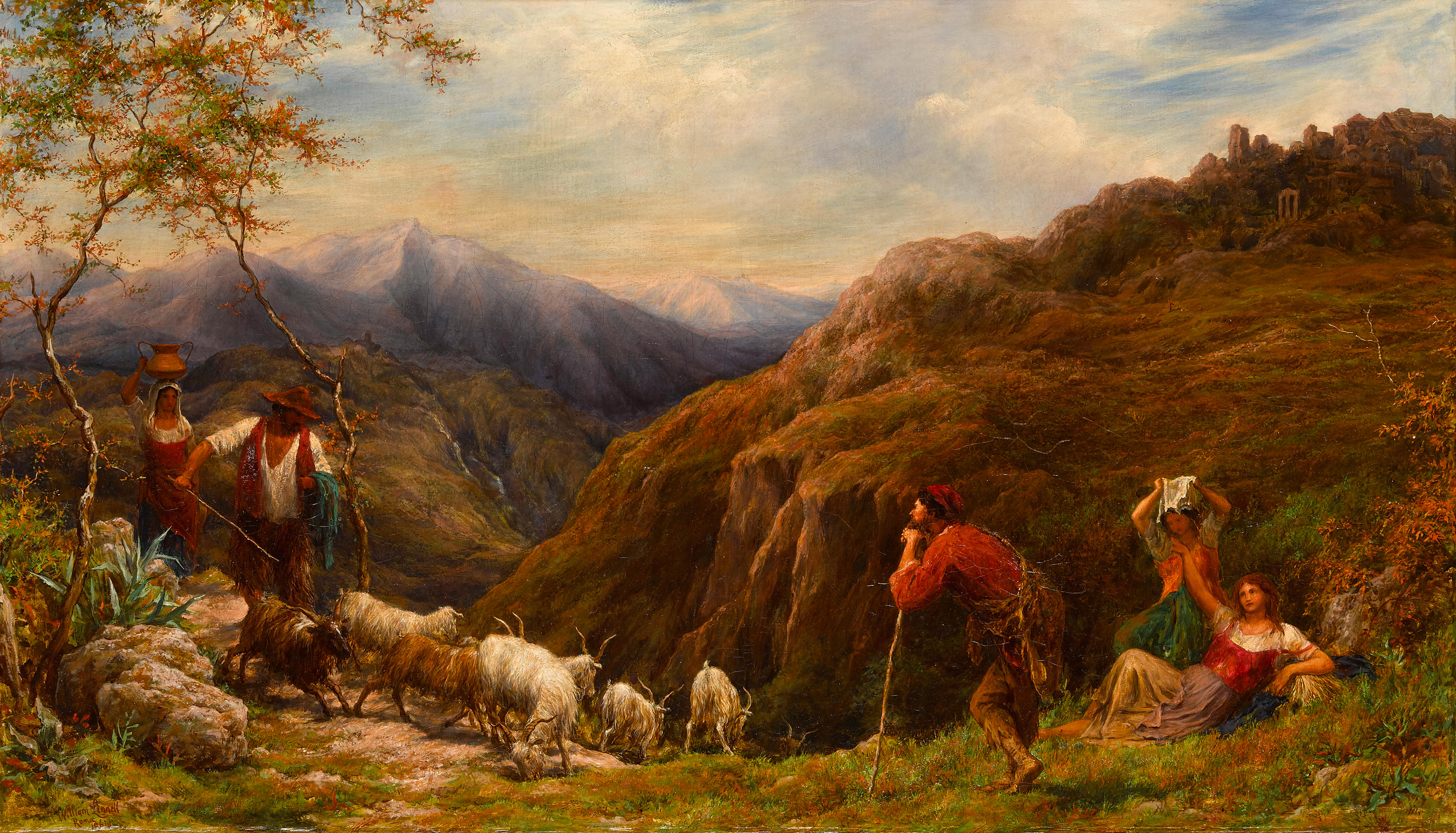
Herding goats in the Apennine Mountains

A goatherd or goatherder is a person who herds goats as a vocational activity. It is similar to a shepherd who herds sheep.

=== Sheep ===
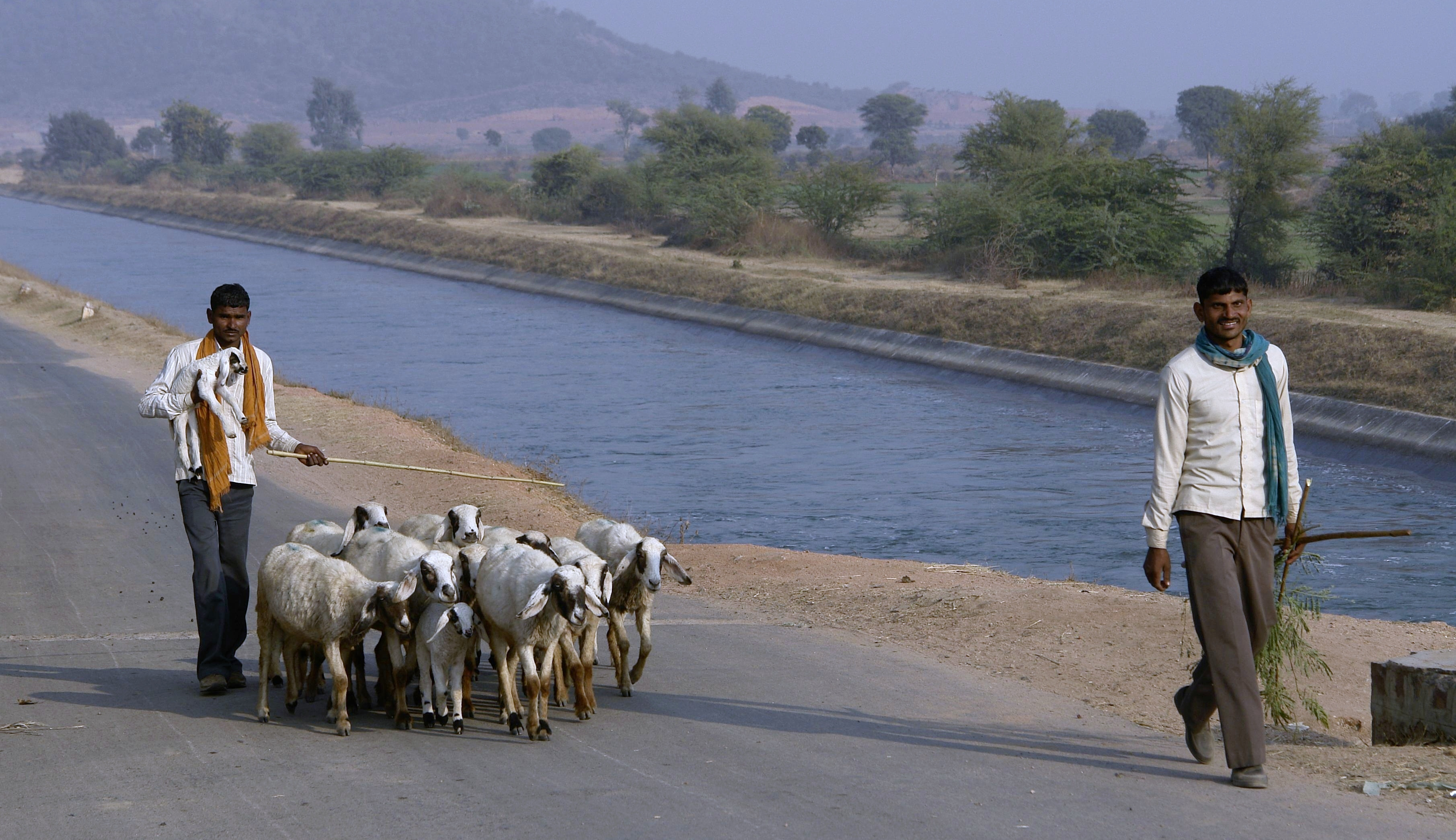
Shepherds travelling in Chambal, India

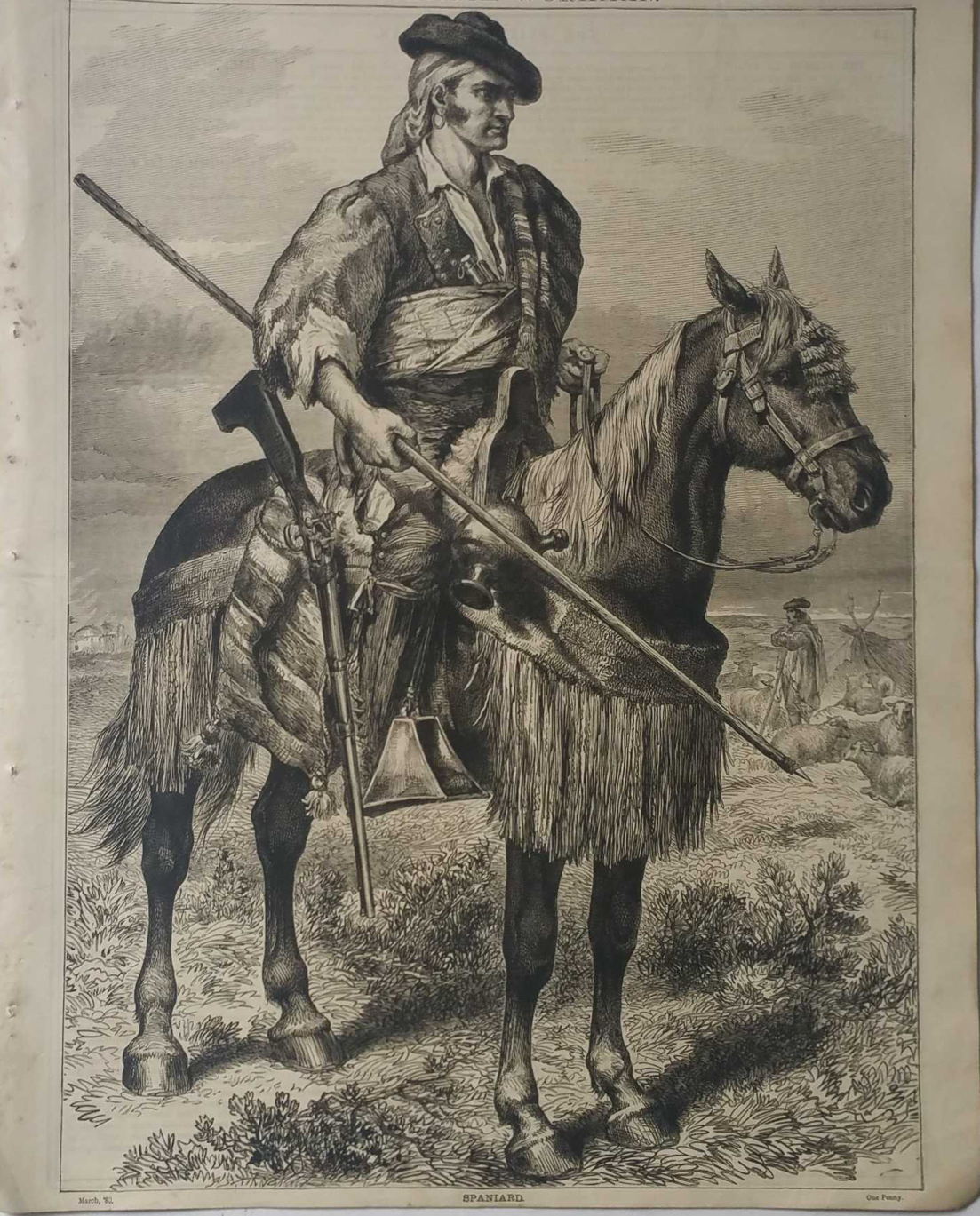
Spanish shepherd on horseback herding sheep in Murcia (1880).

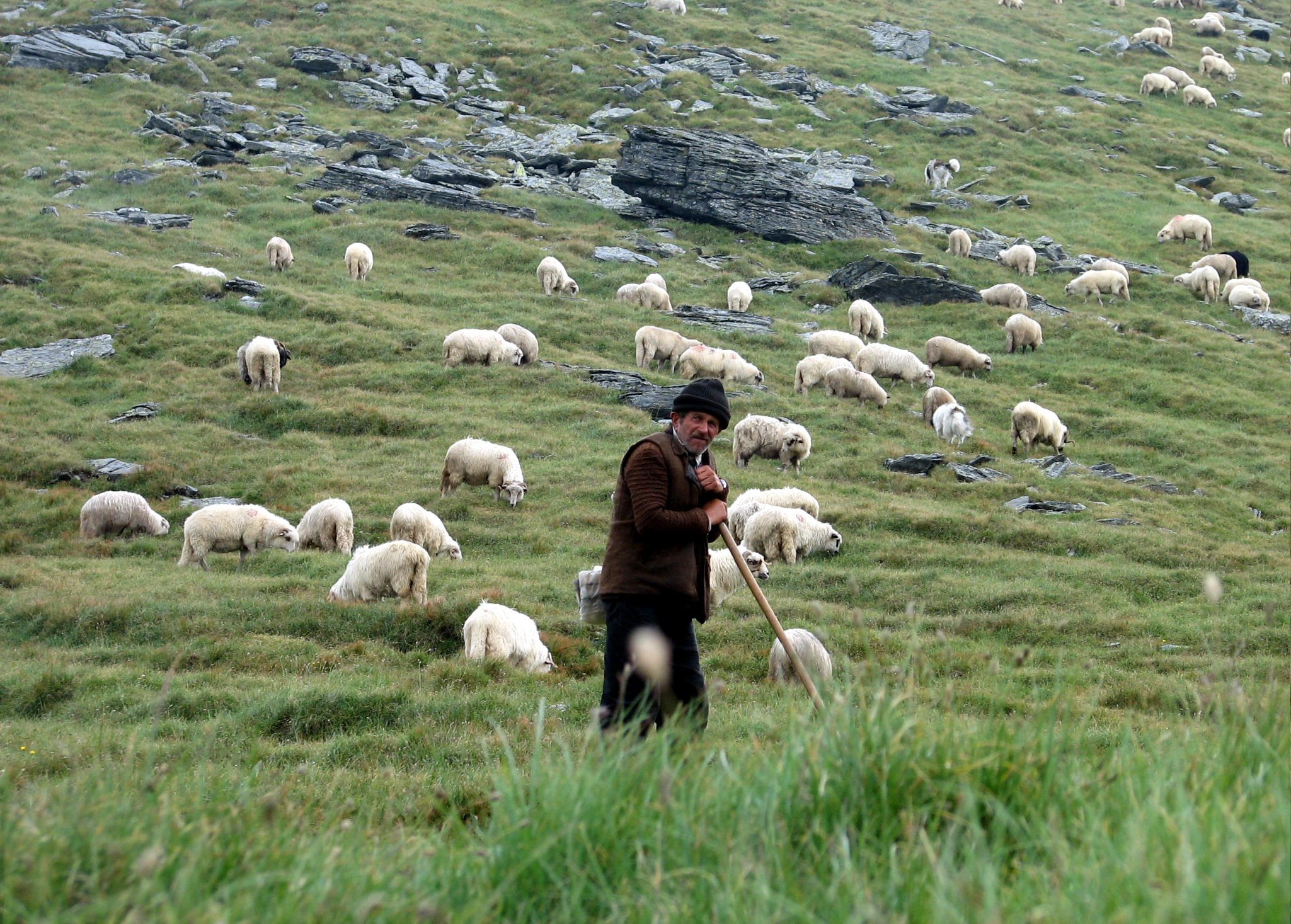
Shepherd with grazing sheep in Făgăraș Mountains, Romania

A shepherd is a person who tends, herds, feeds, or guards flocks of sheep. Shepherding is one of the world's oldest occupations; it exists in many parts of the globe, and it is an important part of pastoralist animal husbandry.

Because the occupation is so widespread, many religions and cultures have symbolic or metaphorical references to shepherds. For example, Jesus called himself the Good Shepherd, and ancient Greek mythologies highlighted shepherds such as Endymion and Daphnis. This symbolism and shepherds as characters are at the center of pastoral literature and art.

=== Other ===
- A swineherd or hogherd herds pigs.
- A gooseherd herds geese.

== See also ==
- Fulani herdsmen
