= Audita querela =

Audita querela (Law Latin for "[the] complaint [having been] heard") is a writ, stemming from English common law, that serves to permit a defendant who has had a judgment rendered against him or her to seek relief of the consequences of such a judgment where there is some new evidence or legal defense that was not previously available. The writ is thus generally used to prevent a judgment from being executed where enforcement of that judgment would be "contrary to justice". At common law, the writ may be useful where a creditor engages in fraud before the judgment is rendered, or because the debt had been discharged, paid or otherwise satisfied after the judgment is rendered.

The writ has existed at various times in England, Canada and the United States, and possibly Scotland. In England, it fell out of use in favor of less expensive remedies, and was ultimately abolished in 1875. In Canada, the writ has either fallen into disuse or been abolished entirely. In United States federal civil law, it was abolished by the Federal Rules of Civil Procedure in 1948, but still exists in the civil procedure of some states. The writ has also been adopted to some specialized United States federal criminal practice, especially involving the effects of sentences on immigration law. As to Scotland, few records exist as to the writ, though equivalent actions exist.

== History ==
=== English beginnings ===
[Audita querela] is a writ of a most remedial nature, and seems to have been invented, lest in any case there should be an oppressive defect of justice, where a party has a good defence, but by the ordinary forms of law had no opportunity to make it. but the indulgence now shewn by the courts in granting a summary relief upon motion, in cases of such evident oppression, and driven it quite out of practice.

— William Blackstone, Commentaries on the Laws of England, volume 3, page 405

The writ of audita querela defendentis (Law Latin for "[the] complaint [of the] defendant [having been] heard"), later shortened to audita querela, (Law Latin for "[the] complaint [having been] heard") was first authorized by Parliament in 1336, during the reign of Edward III, and may have existed as early as 1282. The writ would issue from the Court of Chancery, directed towards either the King's Bench or the Court of Common Pleas, and would direct the court to hear the parties and "do speedy justice to the debtor". In the Middle Ages, the writ became a general remedy for victims of forgery and similar issues, which development led to the importation of the writ to the United States. The writ was used to vacate a judgment rendered against a debtor where that debtor had paid the debt or the debt had otherwise been discharged. This was to ensure that a creditor could not collect the same debt twice.

A hearing on a writ of audita querela was a full trial on the merits of the case, rather than a simple procedural hearing, and could result in both equitable remedies as well as summary judgment. The expense of pursuing a full trial was one of the factors that led to the writ's decline by the late 1660s, particularly as many plaintiffs only sought summary judgment, and English courts became more willing to entertain much cheaper to pursue motions for summary judgment. Two English statutes in particular, in allowing relatively simple affidavits in ex parte proceedings to secure summary judgment, led to an increase in their use in place of audita querela: the Charities Procedure Act 1812 and the Summary Procedure on Bills of Exchange Act 1855. The former granted several English courts greater liberty to review affidavits and award summary relief in cases involving charitable trusts. The latter permitted bearers of promissory notes and endorsed bills of exchange to pursue ex parte proceedings for summary judgment through the filing of an affidavit.

The writ of audita querela was abolished entirely by the Rules of the Supreme Court in 1875 by Order 42, r. 22.

. . . jeo vous die bien que Audita Querela est done plus dequite qe de comune lay, qar ore tarde il ny avoit pas tiel suyte, et par cas la suyte est done forsqe al primer.

. . . I tell you plainly that Audita Querela is given rather by Equity than by Common Law, for quite recently there was no such suit, and possibly the suit is given only to the first.

— Y.B. 17 Edw. 3, fol. 27b, Easter term, pl. 24 (1343) (Eng.) (Stonor, J.) (Luke Owen Pike trans. 1901)

One question that has persisted is whether audita querela functioned in equity or at common law. William Searle Holdsworth argued the former position, whereas Theodore Plucknett argued the latter. Holdsworth's History of English Law cites an early legal opinion by John Stonor as well as Blackstone's Commentaries for the proposition that the writ was of an equitable nature. Plucknett's A Concise History of the Common Law argues that the writ provided no greater relief than was traditionally available at common law for abuse of process. He also offers a different interpretation of Stonor's statement, arguing that it means the writ permitted a defendant to assert common law defenses where a statute's intent was to make such defenses inaccessible. As such, Plucknett argues that the circumstances under which the writ was available were few and circumscribed.

=== Canada ===
By 1878, the writ of audita querela had fallen into disuse in Canada, and was considered obsolete by 1940.

=== Scotland ===
The writ may have been adopted in Scotland during the reign of Robert the Bruce under the name Breve de pauperibus quod dicitur Audita querela as a brieve, a Scots law writ issuing from chancery. The brieve may have involved a payment from the Exchequer, but did not appear to take root in Scots law. The text of the ancient brieve has been lost.

Prior to the abolition of audita querela in England, the equivalent action in Scots law was suspension to stay diligence. Subsequently, the English equivalent to the Scots action became stay of execution.

=== United States ===
In United States jurisprudence, the writ of audita querela functioned as a common-law action, sounding in tort. As in England, the writ had to be brought in the trial court that rendered the original judgment. An essential element of bringing an action at audita querela was injury or danger thereof, and it had to be brought between the two parties of the earlier proceeding that rendered the judgment. It also required that, if there were multiple defendants subject to the original judgment, they all take part in the proceeding unless the defendant bringing the suit was the sole defendant subject to execution and only brought the suit to vacate the judgment.

The writ saw use in a great variety of circumstances and situations, but there were two primary uses. First, like in England, the writ could be used when a defense was not brought during the earlier trial because it was unavailable, or if the debt subject to the judgment had since been discharged. Second, the writ started to be extended to situations arising prior to judgment, such as where a creditor sought and obtained a judgment in an improper way that deprived the debtor of the chance to defend against the case in court.

==== Modern status ====
As one commentator succinctly summarized, the writ of audita querela is "shrouded in ancient lore and mystery."

— Robbins 1992, p. 645, quoting Fed. R. Civ. P. 60(b), 1946 advisory committee notes.

Audita querela was abolished in United States federal civil procedure in 1948 by Rule 60(b), which provides the procedure for relief from a final judgment through a motion. The specific language of Rule 60(b) that abolished the writ was moved to 60(e) in 2007. Some states have abolished the writ, and in those that have not, where a motion may be used to accomplish the same outcome, the use of the writ has been almost completely replaced by an equivalent motion. The writ has been explicitly abolished in the states of Florida, Illinois, Indiana, Kansas, Kentucky, Massachusetts, Michigan, Minnesota, Mississippi, Missouri, Nevada, Oregon, Rhode Island, South Carolina and Washington. In Ohio, it is said that audita querela is not part of the law.

In federal criminal procedure, the writ may sometimes be used to contest a conviction on legal grounds where there is no other postconviction remedy available. In this sense, audita querela, along with other common law remedies, serves to fill gaps in the system of postconviction remedies. A specific situation in which this has been used is to avoid the immigration consequences of a conviction. Another case in which it has been used has been to vacate a long-past conviction with a law which has since been judged unconstitutional. With respect to state criminal proceedings, while it has been said that the writ is inapplicable, there is authority to the contrary.

== Practice ==
=== United States ===
Audita querela serves to permit a defendant who has had a judgment rendered against him or her to seek relief of the consequences of such a judgment where there is some new evidence or legal defense that was not previously available. The writ is thus generally used to prevent a judgment from being executed where enforcement of that judgment would be "contrary to justice". At common law, the writ may be useful where a creditor engages in fraud before the judgment is rendered, or because the debt had been discharged, paid or otherwise satisfied after the judgment is rendered.

Specific uses of the writ may include judgments that the debtor has paid, for debts that have been discharged in bankruptcy and that exceed the jurisdiction of the court. Default judgments rendered where there was no service of process may be set aside through the writ, as may writs of execution issued in an amount greater than the judgment and judgments for debts where the creditor has released his or her rights to the debtor. A judgment against a minor lacking a guardian ad litem or against someone mentally incompetent whose guardian has not been notified may also be voided by the writ.

The writ is distinguished from other remedies primarily in terms of the timing of the grounds for objecting to the judgment, rather than the actual nature of the grounds, such as whether they are purely equitable. It may be further distinguished from the writ of coram nobis in that the latter is used to vacate a judgment, rather than the consequences of a judgment. Thus, audita querela may issue against judgments that were valid when rendered, while coram nobis would be used against judgments that were never valid.
