= Nové Syrovice =

- Municipality
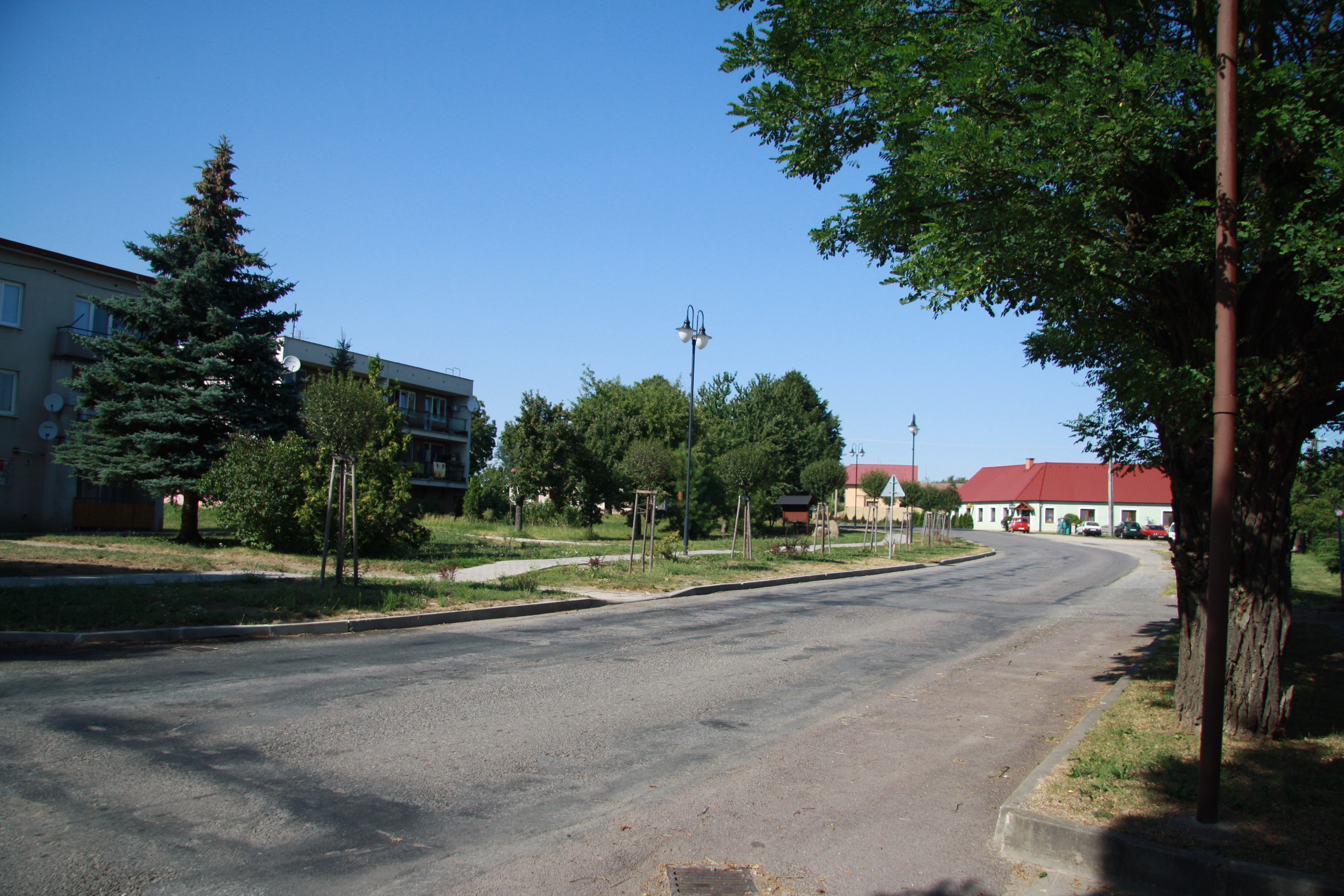
- Centre of Nové Syrovice

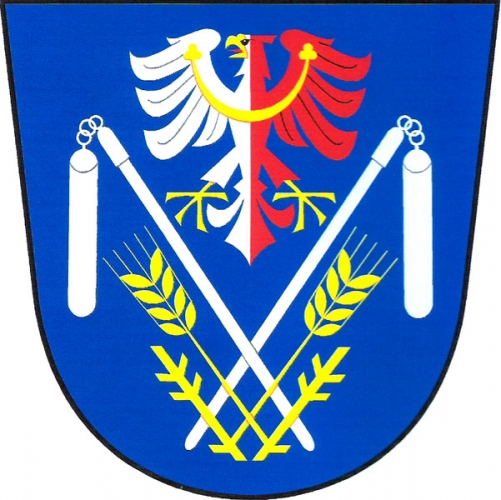
- Flag Coat of arms

- Location in the Czech Republic
- Coordinates: 49°1′4″N 15°46′24″E
- Country: Czech Republic
- Region: Vysočina
- District: Třebíč
- First mentioned: 1491

Area
  - Total: 21.66 km^{2} (8.36 sq mi)
- Elevation: 438 m (1,437 ft)

Population (2026-01-01)
  - Total: 925
  - Density: 42.7/km^{2} (111/sq mi)
- Time zone: UTC+1 (CET)
  - Summer (DST): UTC+2 (CEST)
- Postal code: 675 41
- Website: www.novesyrovice.cz

Nové Syrovice is a municipality and village in Třebíč District in the Vysočina Region of the Czech Republic. It has about 900 inhabitants.

Nové Syrovice lies approximately 25 kilometres (16 mi) south of Třebíč, 45 km (28 mi) south of Jihlava, and 154 km (96 mi) south-east of Prague.

== Administrative division ==
Nové Syrovice consists of two municipal parts (in brackets population according to the 2021 census):

- Nové Syrovice (747)
- Krnčice (120)

== Demographics ==
Historical population
Year	Pop.	±%
1869	767	—
1880	813	+6.0%
1890	814	+0.1%
1900	887	+9.0%
1910	953	+7.4%
1921	1,026	+7.7%
1930	994	−3.1%
1950	907	−8.8%
1961	984	+8.5%
1970	1,061	+7.8%
1980	1,005	−5.3%
1991	966	−3.9%
2001	986	+2.1%
2011	954	−3.2%
2021	867	−9.1%
Source: Censuses

== Notable people ==
- Johann Georg Grasel (1790–1818), robber and murderer
