= Road agent =

Road agent is another name for highwayman.

Road agent may also refer to:

- Road Agent (1941 film), directed by Charles Lamont
- Road Agent (1952 film), directed by Lesley Selander
- Road Agent (professional wrestling), a professional wrestling liaison between the wrestlers and management
- Road Agent, a bubble topped car created by Ed Roth
