= Adam the Leper =

14th-century English robber

Adam the Leper was the leader of a fourteenth-century robber band, operating in South East England in the 1330s and 1340s. Like the north Midlands bandits Eustace Folville and James Cotterel, he and his gang specialised in theft, especially directed against the royal court and its agents. Unlike these contemporaries, he seems to have concentrated mainly on urban centres. The best documented of his crimes involved a night-time attack against a London merchant with ties to Philippa of Hainault, Queen consort of Edward III. According to Luke Owen Pike, while the trader was holding a number of the queen's jewels in safekeeping, Adam and his gang laid siege to his house, demanding Philippa's property be surrendered to them. When the man refused, his house was set alight, and the treasure seized by force. This was the most serious loss of royal property through criminal seizure since Richard of Pudlicott's attack on the treasury of Edward I in 1303.

Adam appeared to have died in the early 1360s.

== Sources ==
- Donaldson, W. (2002), Rogues, Villains and Eccentrics, Phoenix:London. ISBN 0-7538-1791-8.
- Pike, L. O. (1873), A History of Crime in England: Illustrating the Changes of the Laws in the Progress of Civilisation, Smith, Elder and Co.: London.
