= Young Morgan =

English folk song

"Young Morgan" (Roud 5369, also known as "The Flying Highwayman") is an English folk ballad. It is part of a tradition of positive highwayman ballads, and portrays Morgan (who is only known from this song) as a hero who does not rob the poor.

== History ==
The song appears in two broadside ballads. The earliest version, "The Flying Highwayman" is undated, but is estimated to be from around 1750. (Note: The date is often estimated to c. 1780 (attributed to Holloway and Black). Tim Hitchcock and Robert Shoemaker consider this date, but argue that around 1750 is more plausible, as suggested by the English Short Title Catalogue. Mike Yates says that it "certainly reads as though it comes from the last quarter of the 18th century", while Graham Seal instead gives the date as probably late seventeenth century or early eighteenth century.) Unlike later versions, it ends with Morgan being pardoned by the king. The second, "Young Morgan", is dated to the early nineteenth century, (Note: Mike Yates suggests that it was printed around 1820.) and omits the first and last verses.

According to John Wardroper, the song was very popular, and led to a sequel being written, in which Morgan, after being pardoned, travels to France where he uses a black pudding as a fake pistol, and becomes a successful highwayman.

Two verses, from a version where the highwayman was hanged at Tyburn, were remembered by Walter Sholto Douglas, who heard a young Romani woman singing the ballad around 1801:

I stood as bold as John of Gaunt,
All in my natty attire;
I ne'er seem'd daunted in the least,
Which made the folks admire!

That all the people they may say,
That I am no des-arter;
For the captain, he must lead the way,
And the men must follow a'-ter.

Phoebe Smith sang two verses of the song to Mike Yates in 1975/76. She said her brother had learned it from an old man who knew someone that had been present at the highwayman's execution. These verses were recorded, and included in her album The Yellow Handkerchief (2001):

Young Morgan he got catched at last,
For trial he is laying.
And ain't that a pity that young man should die,
Out of this world he's going.

As I walked through the city gates,
I heard some people talking.
"Young Morgan he has confessed at last.
Now his friends will follow after."

Martin Carthy heard Phoebe Smith's recording, and wrote his own version, based on this and the "Young Morgan" broadside ballad. He included the song on his album Waiting for Angels (2004).

The folk group Duck Soup performed "Young Morgan" for their album Open on Sundays (2010), sung by Dan Quinn.
