= Betyár =

Betyárs
- Founding location: Kingdom of Hungary
- Years active: Early-late 19th century
- Territory: Hungary
- Ethnicity: Hungarian and Slovak
- Criminal activities: banditry, highway robbery, horse theft, mail robbery, train robbery

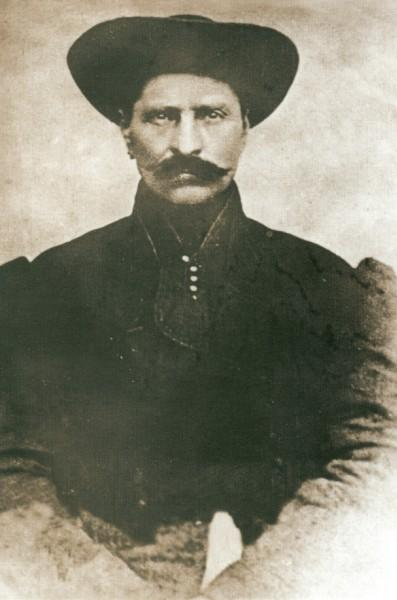
Portrait of Sándor Rózsa

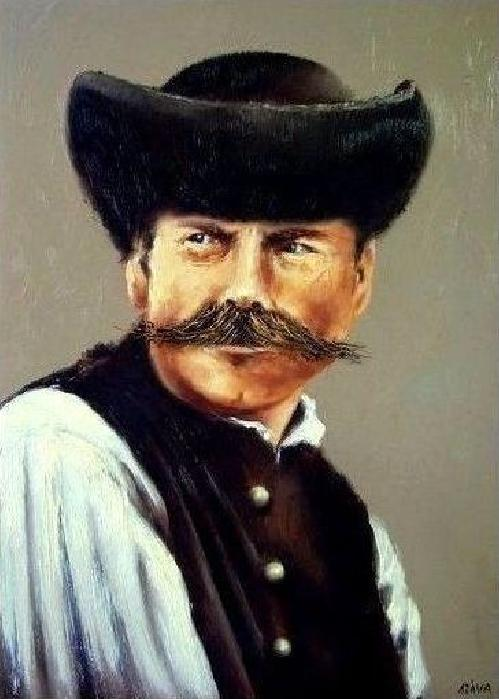
Jóska Sobri (painted by Sándor Száva)

The betyárs (Hungarian: betyár (singular) or betyárok (plural)) were the highwaymen of the 19th century Kingdom of Hungary. The "betyár" word is the Hungarian version of "Social Bandit". (The word itself is of Ottoman Turkish origin:"bekar" means 'bachelor' or 'unmarried man' in Turkish.)

Several betyárs have become legendary figures who in the public mind fought for social justice. The most famous Hungarian betyárs were Sándor Rózsa from the Great Hungarian Plain, Jóska Sobri, Jóska Savanyú from Bakony and Márton Vidróczky from Mátra.

Batyar culture (Ukrainian: батяр, romanized: batiar) was spread in the western part of Ukraine (modern Lviv, Ivano-Frankivsk, Zakarpattia, Ternopil oblast) during the 19th and 20th centuries.

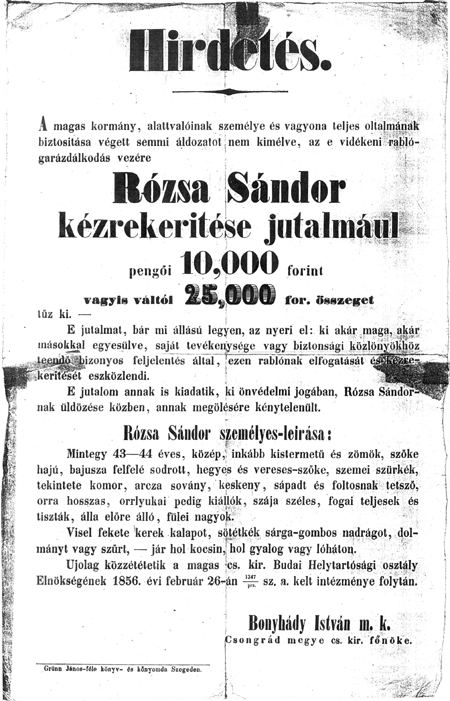
A wanted poster from 1856 promising reward for Sándor Rózsa, dead or alive

== Hungarian folktale tradition ==
Until the 1830s they were mainly regarded as criminals, but an increasing public appetite for betyár songs, ballads and stories gradually gave a romantic image to these armed and usually mounted robbers. Rózsa is only the foremost of many Hungarian outlaw heroes, or betyárs, who appear in Hungarian history and folklore. There is a far-flung Hungarian folktale tradition featuring a large number of local Robin Hoods.

== Famous betyárs ==
- Juraj Jánošík (1688-1713)
- Sándor Rózsa (1813-1877)
- Jóska Savanyú
- Szűts György
- Szűcs (from aba)
- Jóska Sobri (1810-1837)
- Márton Vidróczki
- Martin "Marci" Káposztás
- Sofia Táčiková

== See also ==
- Csikós
- Gulyás (herdsman)
- Hajduk (soldiers)
