= Umayanalloor =

- Village
- Location within Kerala
- Coordinates: 9.0927°N 76.8612°E
- Country: India
- State: Kerala
- District: Kollam

Languages
  - Official: Malayalam
- Time zone: UTC+5:30 (IST)
- Post Office: Umayanalloor
- PIN: 691589
- Nearest cities and towns: Kollam, Kottiyam
- Lok Sabha constituency: Kollam
- Assembly constituency: Eravipuram
- Literacy: 93.63%

Umayanaloor is a village near Mayyanad in the Kollam District, Kerala, located near the western coast of the southern tip of India.

== Overview ==
Umayanalloor is a village in the Mayyanad panchayat, and is situated in the South Kerala Division. It acts as a junction on the Kollam-Thiruvananthapuram road (part of NH-47). Kottiyam and other places are connected to Umayanalloor. Malayalam is the native language of Umayanalloor.

The pin code of Naduvilakara, Umayanalloor, and Mayyanad is 691589.

== Education ==
The closest LP School is in Vazhappalli. There are also unaided LP schools in Umayanaloor, namely Rose Dale, AKMHSS,HKM College of Education , Cherupushpam LPS, PVUPS, and the EEGA study center.

== Economy ==
=== Agriculture ===
Paddy rice farming and milk production are the main farming sectors in the village. The production of cashew nuts is also common.

=== Industry ===
Umayanalloor boasts several cashew nut processing plants, as well as an industrial estate consisting mainly of snack factories. The village also has ice cream factories and old wooden furniture shops.

=== Banking ===
Branches of larger banks, such as the Umayanallor Service Co-operation Bank, the Federal Bank, and Muthoot Finance can be found in Umayanalloor.

== Politics ==
Umayanalloor is part of the Eravipuram assembly constituency in Kollam (Lok Sabha constituency), with M. Noushad being the current MLA of Eravipuram. N. K. Premachandran is the current Member of Parliament from Kollam.

== Religion ==
There are many and diverse centers of worship in Umayanalloor. These include the Balasubramanya Swami Temple, Mylapure Muslim Juma Masjid, Durgapuri Sree Madankovil Temple, Valiyaveettil Nujumudeen Masjid,Umayanalloor Mosque, and Amalothbhava Matha Church
