= Johann Georg Grasel =

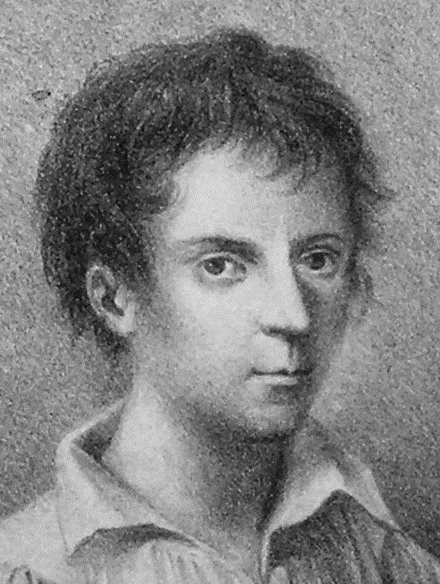
Johann Georg Grasel

Johann Georg Grasel (Czech: Jan Jiří Grasel; 4 April 1790 – 31 January 1818) was a Czech robber and murderer. He robbed and murdered in south Moravia and northern Lower Austria during the era of the Austrian Empire. His name is used in Czech as a common term for a rascal or villain (written as grázl) to this day.

== Biography ==
Grasel was born in Nové Syrovice into the poor family of a knacker. Both his father and his mother helped themselves by stealing, occasionally ending up in prison. Young Johann was forced to steal to survive and at the age of 9 he entered prison for the first time (for 2 weeks). Grasel became leader of several groups of brutal robbers in south Moravia and northern Lower Austria. He managed to escape from prison several times. In 1815 he and his group of 66 were caught by the authorities. Grasel was accused of 205 crimes, including several murders and sentenced to death. Sixty thousand people watched when he and his two colleagues were hanged in Vienna; when Grasel saw the crowds, he uttered his last words: "Jesus, so many people."

Unlike many others of his kind Grasel entered folk legends, both as a noble hero who took from the rich to give to the poor and as a brutal rascal. The second interpretation made it into Czech and the word grázl (meaning 'villain') is now commonly used, even without knowledge of its origin.

== Popular culture ==
In the Czechoslovak TV series Slavné historky zbojnické ('Famous bandit stories', 1985), Grasel is portrayed by Czech actor Ivan Vyskočil.
