= Gulyás (herdsman) =

Traditional mounted cattle herdsman of Hungary

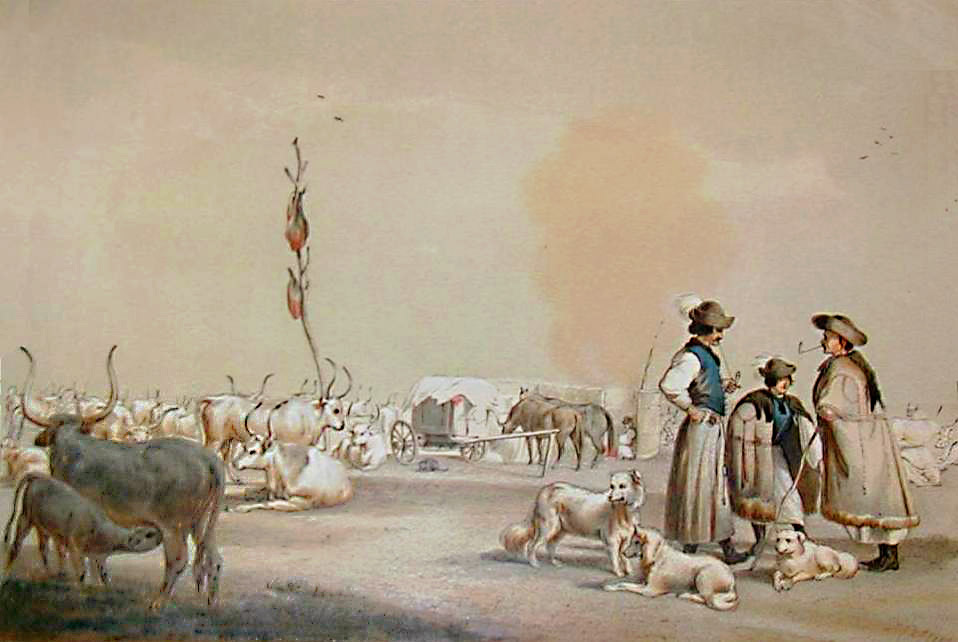
Gulyás by Sterio Károly (1821–1862)

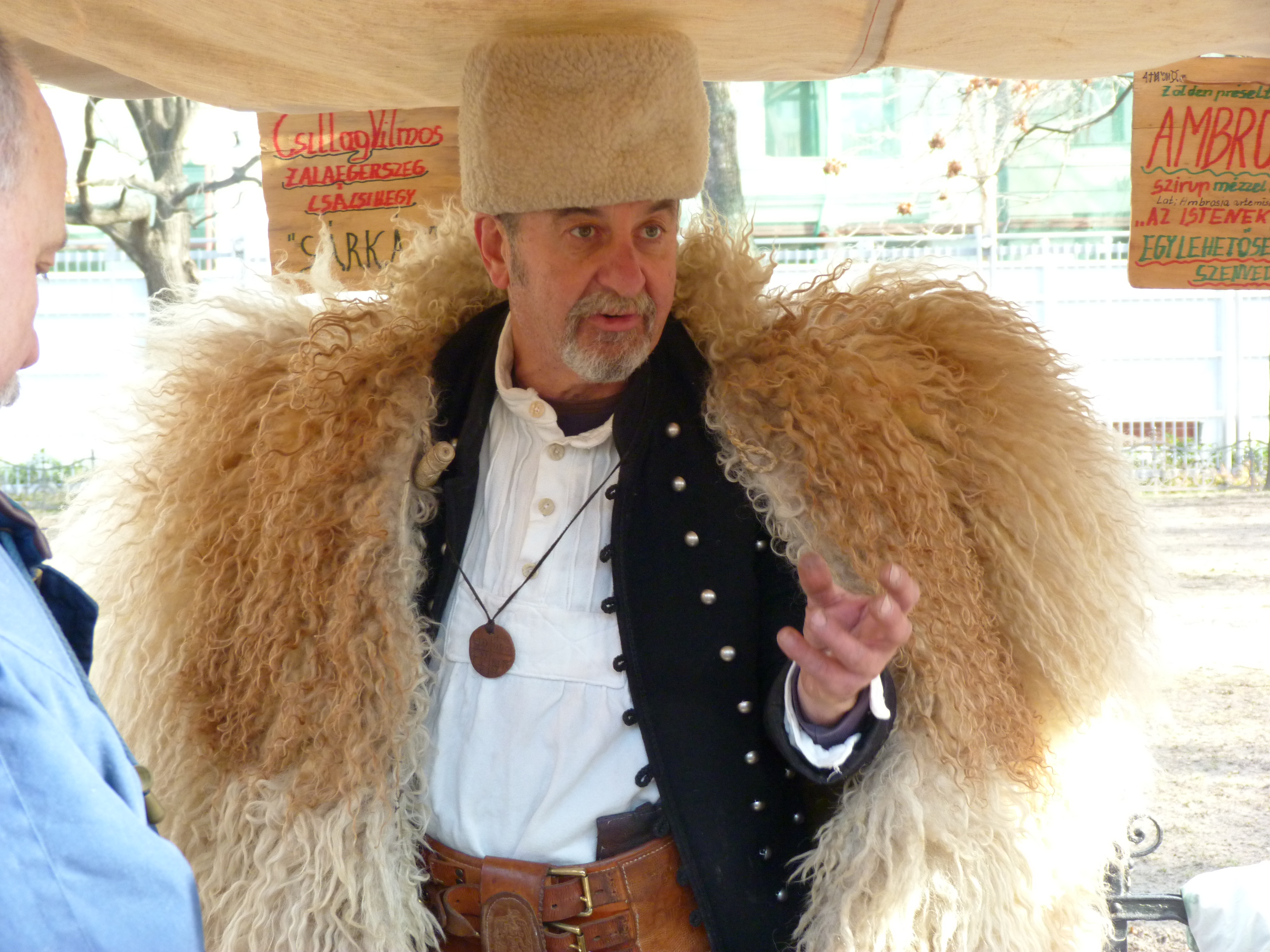
Hungarian herdsman in traditional clothes

The gulyás (Hungarian pronunciation: [ˈɡujaːʃ]) is the traditional mounted cattle-herdsman of Hungary. The gulyás tradition is associated with the Hungarian puszta and with the Hungarian Grey or Hungarian Steppe breed of Podolic cattle (Hungarian: Magyar szürke szarvasmarha), now considered a meat breed but formerly used as oxen. Gulyás is the origin of the word goulash.

== See also ==
- Csikós
- Betyárs
- Hajduk (soldiers)
