= Kayamkulam Kochunni (2018 film) =

Indian film directed by Rosshan Andrrews

- Theatrical release poster
- Directed by: Rosshan Andrrews
- Written by: Bobby & Sanjay
- Produced by: Gokulam Gopalan
- Starring: Nivin Pauly; Sunny Wayne; Priya Anand; Babu Antony; Priyanka Thimmesh
- Narrated by: Mohanlal
- Cinematography: Binod Pradhan; Nirav Shah; Sudheer Palsane
- Edited by: A. Sreekar Prasad
- Music by: Gopi Sundar
- Production company: Sree Gokulam Movies
- Distributed by: Eros International
- Release date: 11 October 2018 (India)
- Running time: 170 minutes
- Country: India
- Language: Malayalam
- Budget: ₹45 crore
- Box office: ₹67 crore

Kayamkulam Kochunni is a 2018 Indian Malayalam-language epic period action film directed by Rosshan Andrrews and written by Bobby & Sanjay. It is based on the life of Kayamkulam Kochunni, a famed outlaw who robbed from the rich and gave to the poor during the British Raj in the early 19th century Central Travancore. The film stars Nivin Pauly in the title role as Kayamkulam Kochunni alongside an ensemble cast including Priya Anand, Sunny Wayne, Babu Antony, Priyanka Thimmesh, Shine Tom Chacko, Manikandan R. Achari, M.S. Bhaskar, Sudheer Karamana, Sidhartha Siva and Mukundan. Mohanlal appears in an extended cameo role as Ithikkara Pakki, a highly talented thief and mentor to Kochunni.

In August 2016, Rosshan Andrrews confirmed directing the film, with a screenplay by his regular collaborators Bobby and Sanjay. Principal photography commenced on 30 September 2017 in Udupi. Filming took place in Manjeshwar, Mangalore, Goa, Kasaragod and Sri Lanka. The filming was completed on 1 June 2018. The film has music by Gopi Sundar and editing by A. Sreekar Prasad. The cinematography was handled by Binod Pradhan, Nirav Shah and Sudheer Palsane.

Kayamkulam Kochunni released on 11 October 2018 met with a positive critical response and was a commercial success becoming the highest-grossing Malayalam film of 2018.

== Plot ==
In 1830 A.D., a messenger tells the people of Kayamkulam that Kayamkulam Kochunni, a famed Mappila outlaw of the area, will be executed by hanging.

In the past, Baputty, Kochunni's father, is a famed thief who struggles to look after his family. One time he gets caught and is beaten up by the local Brahmins in front of Kochunni, who was a young boy at the time. His mother, not wanting him to grow up in abject poverty and suffer the same fate as his father, persuades him to leave home. He ends up in the house of a local Brahmin landlord and works as an employee in one of his shops.

At present, Kochunni is an adult. He meets Janaki, a Hindu lower-caste servant, and falls in love with her, also learning from her that Thangal, a state-renowned fight master, has opened a school to train students in martial arts. After jumping into a well and wrestling with a large python to rescue a boy, Kochunni is awarded a medal of bravery by the local British officer and makes a wish that he wants to join in with the dance and celebrations in their local British fort, which the officer grants.

Kochunni goes to the martial arts school but is turned away by Thangal on the basis that, like his father, he might become an even bigger thief by learning martial arts. Janaki also confesses her love for him, and with her help, he learns by sitting and watching the training from afar. He is soon caught by Thangal and he tests Kochunni by making him fight his best student, Keshava, which Kochunni wins. Thangal promises to teach him, believing that one day Kochunni will become his successor. Angered by this, Keshava leaves the school, threatening Kochunni and promising revenge.

During a stormy journey from Kochi, Kochunni's landlord falls into the Kayamkulam Lake. While rescuing him, Kochunni sees a stash of gold at the bottom of the lake. Kochunni reports this to the local Brahmin landlords, who persuade him to bring the gold to them in return for three wishes. He successfully brings the gold and is granted one of the wishes, which was a bag of gold. However, their henchmen beat him up during his return and the Brahmins falsely accuse him of robbery and punish him by dipping his hand in boiling oil and hanging him upside down for four days. Janaki is then stoned and banished from Kayamkulam for loving a man from another caste.

However, on the fourth day, Ithikkara Pakki, an infamous outlaw, known for ruthlessly beheading his enemies, comes and frees Kochunni, taking him to his forest hideout. He persuades Kochunni to take revenge against the Brahmins by stealing, and he agrees. He is then subjected to intense and hard training by Pakki and his gang of three thieves, Mammad, Kunju Marakkar and Noor Ahmed. He becomes a successful highwayman by carrying out robberies against several travelling Brahmins. They then rob several shops of Brahmins in the Kayamkulam market to show their power. Even though they rob many stores, Kochunni refuses to rob his ex-caretaker's store, telling him that he cannot watch his beloved ones being attacked by others, unlike what he did when Kochunni was falsely accused by the landlords.

After Pakki leaves, Kochunni becomes the hero for the downtrodden, being a robber for the poor. Keshavan, who is out to destroy Kochunni, makes several unsuccessful plans to kill him, before using Janaki to lure Kochunni. However, Kochunni killed the British general and is given the death sentence as he was cheated by his mates who joined Keshavan.

While awaiting capital punishment, Thangal arrives. Kochunni and Thangal plan the way for Kochunni to escape using a letter given by King Swathy Thirunal Rama Varma. The procession for the hanging goes with song and martyrs. When Kochunni is about to be hanged, he uses his Kalari skills and after a struggling fight, escapes with the help of Thangal. A battle occurs between the British officers and the local villagers led by Kochunni.

In the present day, Kayamkulam Kochunni's temple, at Edappara Maladevar nada kshethram, in the district of Pathanamthitta is shown.

== Cast ==
- Nivin Pauly as Kayamkulam Kochunni
- Sunny Wayne as Thananayik Keshava Kurup
- Babu Antony as Thangal
- Priya Anand as Janaki
- Priyanka Thimmesh as Suhara
  - Davia Mary as young Suhara
- Shine Tom Chacko as Kochu Pillai
- Romanch Rajendran as Kunju Marakkar
- Manikandan R. Achari as Vava
- Sidhartha Siva as British Advicer
- Aneesh G. Menon as Noor Ahmed
- Amith Chakalakkal as Mammad
- Sadiq as Kunjikelu
- Mukundan as Pulikeshi
- Thesni Khan as Suhara's Mother
- Sunil Sukhada as Brahmin
- Sudheer Karamana as Naduvazhi / Nair leader
- M. S. Bhaskar as Mothalali
- Idavela Babu as Menon
- Jude Anthany Joseph as Brahmin
- Sudev Nair as Swathi Thirunal Rama Varma
- Vishnu Premkumar as Uthram Thirunal Marthanda Varma
- Riaz M T as Brahmin
- Padmaraj Ratheesh as Jootha Mappila, a Jewish trader
- Mohanlal as Ithikkara Pakki (extended cameo appearance)
- Nora Fatehi as the item number in the song "Nrithageethikalennum" (special appearance)

== Production ==
=== Development ===
By late August 2016, Rosshan Andrrews confirmed via media outlets that he would be directing a film based on the life of Kerala's heroic outlaw Kayamkulam Kochunni, written by his regular collaborators Bobby & Sanjay and Nivin Pauly playing the title character, to be produced by Gokulam Gopalan. It is the second film based on Kayamkulam Kochunni after the 1966 film of the same name. Kayamkulam Kochunni was a real-life thief who lived in 19th century in the Central Travancore region. He is said to have stolen from the rich and gave to the poor like Robin Hood. The screenplay was written after a two-and-a-half-year research by an eight-member team. The script was rehashed three times. Kayamkulam Kochunni holds the subtitle "most dangerous man". According to Andrrews, the film would feature Kochunni's life before and after his transition as a thief, his survival attempts, romance, and the social structure during the time. It would also discuss several unanswered questions in his story. Since the appearance of present-day Kayamkulam, Alappuzha district has changed from the time of Kochunni, a Sri Lankan village was to be set as Kayamkulam in the film. Filming was then planned to commence by the beginning of 2017 in Sri Lanka, a few scenes were also planned in Kayamkulam. Andrrews also revealed that they have plans to dub and release the film in Tamil language. P. M. Satheesh was signed as the sound designer. Initially, they had talks with Santhosh Narayanan to compose the film's music.

Kayamkulam Kochunni is a period film set in the 1850s and 1860s in what is present-day Kerala. Bobby and Sanjay collected a large amount of information beyond what was already known through Kottarathil Sankunni's Aithihyamala and through hearsay. Sanjay said that the film focuses on Kochunni's relationships and friendship. Kochunni was a socialist thief, he fought against "unbelievable cruelty" over the caste system that prevailed during that time. The team went on location scouting in Sri Lanka in June 2017. In August, it was reported that the filming would begin on 10 September. Nivin started learning horse riding and Kalaripayattu in August, he had begun learning the basics earlier in the year. He also gained weight for the role. The script demanded the actors to be trained in Kalaripayattu. Apart from Nivin, actors Babu Antony and Sunny Wayne also underwent training. The training sessions were held at Andrrew's martial arts school in Kochi and went through September 2017. During pre-production, Andrrews created miniatures for every set to be used in the film. In early September, Nivin confirmed that the filming would commence in Udupi in a fortnight.

=== Casting ===
According to Andrrews, Nivin was their first and only choice for the role of Kochunni. The film traverse through multiple timelines in Kochunni's life. Nivin was selected for the role since Andrrews felt that he has a flexible body language that suits any role, among his generation of actors. According to Sanjay, Nivin's features matches Sankunni's descriptions of Kochunni in Aithihyamala. Andrrews briefed the film's story to Nivin along with the story of another film he plans to follow up after Kayamkulam Kochunni, to both Nivin agreed. In July 2017, a casting call was released for both males and females aged between 5–40. Amala Paul and Priyanka Thimmesh was confirmed before August 2017. Amala's character was said to be an important figure in Kochunni's life; Priyanka plays the role of Suhra, his wife. Babu Antony confirmed his role in September 2017 as Ithingal Thangal, the mentor of Kochunni.

In late 2017, Amala opted out from the film due to scheduling conflicts, who was replaced by Priya Anand. Andrrews said the rain affected their schedule and had to make changes, which conflicted with Amala's dates who had commitments in Tamil films. Priya cancelled three films for Kayamkulam Kochunni; she plays Janaki. According to Priya, Janaki's story is relevant to every woman. Wayne plays the character named Keshavan, who is well trained in Kalaripayattu. In early January 2018, Nivin and Andrrews announced that Mohanlal would appear in the film in the role of Ithikkara Pakki, a robber contemporary to Kochunni. In a February 2018 interview, Sanjay revealed that Mohanlal has 40 minutes screen time who appears at a particular juncture in the story, "we wished for someone of his stature to play this character. Pakki is Kochunni's contemporary and predecessor. It's Pakki who started the unique style of robbing and that's what Kochunni continued with". In March 2018, Nora Fatehi was confirmed to be appearing in a song sequence in the film, which also features Nivin. Choreographed by Vishnu Deva, it was shot in Goa in that month.

=== Filming ===
Principal photography commenced on 30 September 2017 in Udupi, Karnataka. In the first schedule the team filmed in locations such as Mangalore, Manjeshwar, and Udupi for two months. It was reported that the filming would move to Sri Lanka for the following schedule. Nivin trained in Kalaripayattu every morning before shoot under trainers from Kerala. He had a shot crop haircut and wears a handlebar moustache for the character of Kochunni. Filming was held in Kasaragod and Mangalore during November and December 2017. Large sets were created for the film. Binod Pradhan was the cinematographer. Mohanlal joined the sets in Mangalore on 13 February 2018 and began filming from the following day with the combination scenes between Ithikkara Pakki and Kochunni. The 161 days long filming was wrapped in Sri Lanka on 1 June 2018.

Three cinematographers worked in Kayamkulam Kochunni—Binod Pradhan, Nirav Shah, and Sudheer Palsane. Pradhan worked for 110 days after which the filming was delayed due to Nivin's injury and other reasons and Pradhan had to join Kalank due to prior commitment. Shah was the cinematographer for the next 40 days, who shot the climax and scenes in Goa. Palsane joined for the remaining 11 days for filming the scenes in Sri Lanka. Film's colour grading was done by Red Chillies Entertainment. Kayamkulam Kochunni was made on an average budget of ₹30 crore.

== Music ==
The original soundtrack of the film was composed by Gopi Sundar and released by Eros Now. The lyrics for the songs were written by Shobin Kannangatt and Rafeeq Ahamed.

Track listing
No.	Title	Writer(s)	Singer(s)	Length
1.	"Kalariyadavum"	Shobin Kannangatt	Vijay Yesudas, Shreya Ghoshal	5:10
2.	"Thjanajana Naadam"	Rafeeq Ahamed	Gopi Sundar	3:22
3.	"Nrithageethikalennum"	Shobin Kannangatt	Pushpavathy Poypadathu	3:59

== Release ==
Kayamkulam Kochunni was initially set to release on 15 August 2018, but was postponed for about a week due to delays in completing the post-production. Release was postponed again due to the August 2018 Kerala floods and was rescheduled and released on 11 October 2018.

== Reception ==
=== Critical reception ===
Anna M M Vetticad of The First Post wrote, "Such carefully crafted imagery ensures that despite its visual scale, heart-stopping action, high-adrenaline chases and Gopi Sundar's pulsating music, the dominant takeaway from Kayamkulam Kochunni is its politics and humanity." Sajin Shrijith of The New Indian Express gave a rating 3.5/5 and wrote, "It's not the spectacle from Kayamkulam Kochunni that stayed with me after leaving the theatre; it's the characters. Benita Chacko of Deccan Herald gave a rating of 3.5/5 and wrote, "The period film is worth a watch for its cinematography and detailed setting but you will need to have some patience to watch it unravel."

Deepa Soman of The Times of India gave a rating of 4/5 and wrote, "You might have heard this story n number of times, but it is worth your time and money, all over. The film has what it takes to bring alive all those visuals you had in mind, when you heard or read the story wonderstruck as a little kid." Priyanka Sundar of The Hindustan Times gave a rating 3/5 and wrote, "Nivin Pauly's Kayamkulam Kochunni is the journey of a man who helped his people start a revolution against the oppressors in power. This struggle is not just important to understand what happened in the past, but could also be instrumental in changing mindset for a better future."

Manoj Kumar R of The Indian Express gave a rating of 2/5 and wrote, "Writers Bobby and Sanjay could have made the film more dark and gritty, instead of making it a simple black-and-white story told in broad strokes. It's unclear why the writers were so keen on exonerating Kochunni."

=== Box office ===
Kayamkulam Kochunni was released in more than 350 screens in Kerala and screened 1700 shows in the first day, making it the largest movie release in the state. The film grossed ₹5.30 crore in the opening day from Kerala alone, the highest opening-day collection at Kerala box office. In seven days the film made ₹42 crore worldwide. It grossed ₹53.5 crore worldwide in 10 days. It garnered a worldwide total of ₹59.4 crore in 18 days surpassing Ennu Ninte Moideen to become the fourth highest-grossing Malayalam film of all-time globally after Pulimurugan, Premam, and Drishyam. The film's final box office was estimated to be ₹67–70 crore.

Kayamkulam Kochunni grossed $1,108,021 in the United Arab Emirates from 49 screens in the opening weekend—the best opener of that weekend, and earned $1,654,495 in four weeks. In the opening weekend, the film collected $70,319 (₹52.03 lakh) in the United States and NZ$21,191 (₹10.18 lakh) in New Zealand. Released on 26 October, the film debuted with £39,483 (₹37.19 lakh) in the opening weekend in the United Kingdom. It made $226,069 (₹1.65 crore) in the US in five weeks and £88,368 (₹83.2 lakh) in the UK in three weeks, and NZ$32,264 (₹15.61 lakh) in New Zealand in two weeks.

=== Accolades ===
Award	Category	Recipient / nominee	Result	Ref.
Asianet Film Awards	Best Film	Rosshan Andrrews, Gokulam Gopalan	Nominated	
Asianet Film Awards	Best Actor	Mohanlal	Won	
Asianet Film Awards	Best Screenplay	Bobby–Sanjay	Nominated	
Asianet Film Awards	Most Popular Film	Rosshan Andrrews	Won	
Asianet Film Awards	Most Popular Actor	Nivin Pauly	Nominated	
Asianet Film Awards	Best Music Director	Gopi Sundar	Nominated	
Asianet Film Awards	Best Lyricist	Shobin Kannangatu	Nominated	
South Indian International Movie Awards	Best Film	Sree Gokulam Movies	Nominated	
South Indian International Movie Awards	Best Director	Rosshan Andrrews	Nominated	
South Indian International Movie Awards	Best Cinematographer	Binod Pradhan	Nominated	
Vanitha Film Awards	Best Villain	Sunny Wayne	Won	
Janmabhumi Cinema Awards	Best Art Director	Sunil Babu	Won	
