= Kayamkulam Kochunni =

Heroic outlaw from Travancore

- Born: c. 1818; Kottukulangara, Kayamkulam, Karthikapally Taluk, Travancore
- Died: 1859 (aged 41) Travancore prison 1895/1896(aged 77)
- Resting place: Pettah Juma Masjid, Thiruvananthapuram
- Monuments: Shrine at Edappara Maladevar Nada Temple, Kozhencherry
- Occupations: Brigand; highwayman
- Known for: Stealing from rich people and giving to the poor

Kayamkulam Kochunni (born c. 1818) was a Revolutionary from Kayamkulam, who lived during the late 19th century. He was active in the Travancore area in the present-day Kerala, India. He is said to have stolen from the rich and given to the poor. Legends on his life are part of the folklore of Kerala. His stories are often associated with his friend and fellow outlaw Ithikkara Pakki. A shrine dedicated to Kochunni exists near Kozhencherry.

== History ==
Kochunni was born into a Muslim family in 1818, near Kottukulangara, Karthikapally Taluk in Travancore (present-day Kerala). He spent his childhood and younger ages in Evoor. After his father's death, the family fell into poverty and Kochunni was employed in a grocery store. Later he began stealing and became an outlaw. He was known for stealing from the rich and giving to the poor (just like Robin Hood). Kochunni was once caught by the officials after his lover betrayed him, he escaped and killed her along with her assistant. Following that he went into hiding, during which he stole the Shaligram belonging to the Padmanabhaswamy Temple. Ayilyam Thirunal Rama Varma was Travancore ruler, and T. Madhava Rao was the Diwan of Travancore at that time. Kochunni was accused of several thefts and two homicides. Both the palace and police officials failed to find Kochunni, after which a warrior, Arattupuzha Velayudha Panicker, was enlisted with the task, who eventually captured him and submitted him to the Diwan. Panicker was honoured by the King. Kochunni was remanded for one year, and died in the Travancore jail in 1859. His remains were buried at the Pettah Juma Masjid. According to historians, the Central Archives building in present-day Thiruvananthapuram was formerly a prison in the 19th century and is believed to be the first Travancore prison, which is likely where Kochunni was incarcerated.

However, Kochunni's death is disputed. Another record cites he was imprisoned at Central Prison, Poojappura in his 70s. Some researchers state that it was after the success of the 1966 film that the present account of his death (that he died in September 1859, aged 41) was popularized and dominated while the other account diminished, the movie used the former since it was more suitable for the film's commercial success. As per the other record, he escaped and lived another 36 years. He died at the age of 77 from Tuberculosis at the cow barn of Thoppil tharavadu (family of Thoppil Bhasi) in Vallikunnam. He was staying there undercover as a steward and farm-hand of the family. A woman from the house took care of him during his final days, who was the only one aware of his identity.

During Kochunni's peak time, the Diwan ordered his capture. The then Tahsildar of Karthikapally Taluk managed to capture him with the help of one of Kochunni's confidant. But Kochunni escaped and killed his confidant and the policeman who arrested him. Later, Kunju Panicker was appointed as the Tahsildar. He sought the help of Kochunni's acquaintances Kochu Pillai, Kopparaparambil Mammad, Kaduvachery Vava, Kottappurathu Bappukunju, Pakkolathu Noorammadhu, and Valiyakulangara Kunjumarakkar. Kochunni was invited to Kochu Pillai's wife's home in Vazhappally and sedated him by drugging food. He was arrested, and while transporting him to Thiruvananthapuram through Kayamkulam backwaters, he regained sense and managed to escape by leaping into the water. It is said that Kochunni was in hideout at Pathanamthitta and Punalur after that and to have returned to Kayamkulam during his final period, and shortly after moved to a secure hideout at Thoppil family. While another of the same account states he was successfully transported to Thiruvananthapuram, incarcerated and hanged after 91 days (in 1859 at the age of 41) and his remains to have buried at the Pettah Juma Masjid. However, there is no documentation about his sentencing in state's jail records or in the Mathilakam documents.

== Legacy ==
A shrine dedicated to Kochunni is attached to Edappara Maladevar Nada Temple near Kozhencherry that dates back more than one and a half centuries. People there offer candles, incense sticks, ganja, country-made liquor, betel leaves, pan, areca nut, tobacco, etc. to propitiate the deity. There is a small museum at Varanappallil, an ancestral house in Kayamkulam for Kochunni.

== In popular culture ==
- The legends about Kochunni are compiled in a book by Kottarathil Sankunni in his collection of folklores, Aithihyamala.
- Stories on him are part of the comic book series Amar Chitra Katha.
- Kayamkulam Kochunni, a 1966 Malayalam film, was directed by P. A. Thomas. Sathyan portrayed Kochunni.
- Kaayamkulam Kochunniyude Makan, a 1976 Malayalam film, was directed by J. Sasikumar.
- Kayamkulam Kochunni, a Malayalam TV serial was telecast on Surya TV. A teenage Kochunni was played by Manikuttan.
- Kayamkulam Kochunniyude Makan, a Malayalam TV serial was telecast on Surya TV.
- Kayamkulam Kochunni, a 2018 Malayalam film, was directed by Rosshan Andrrews. Nivin Pauly portrayed Kochunni.
- Pathonpatham Noottandu, a 2022 film by Vinayan in which Chemban Vinod Jose portrays the role of Kochunni.

== See also ==
- Ithikkara Pakki
- Mulamoottil Adima
- Kuroolli Chekon
- Vellayani Paramu
- Jambulingam Nadar
