= Jambulingam =

- Theatrical release poster
- Directed by: J. Sasikumar
- Written by: Pappanamkodu Lakshmanan
- Screenplay by: Pappanamkodu Lakshmanan
- Produced by: E. K. Thyagarajan
- Starring: Prem Nazir; Jayabharathi; Adoor Bhasi; Manavalan Joseph
- Cinematography: R. R. Rajkumar
- Edited by: K. Sankunni
- Music by: M. K. Arjunan; P. S. Divakar (Score)
- Production company: Sree Murugalaya Films
- Distributed by: Dinny Films
- Release date: 30 July 1982
- Country: India
- Language: Malayalam

Jambulingam is a 1982 Indian Malayalam-language period film directed by J. Sasikumar, written by Pappanamkodu Lakshmanan, and produced by E. K. Thyagarajan. It is based on the life of outlaw Jambulingam Nadar. The film stars Prem Nazir, Jayabharathi, Adoor Bhasi and Manavalan Joseph in the lead roles. The film has musical score by M. K. Arjunan.

== Cast ==
- Prem Nazir as Jambulingam Nadar
- Jayabharathi as Subhadra
- Vincent as Muthayah
- Adoor Bhasi as Veerappan
- Ravikumar as Mukundan Pilla
- Sathaar as Moosakutty
- T. G. Ravi as Pazhani
- C. I. Paul as Ponnayyan
- Prathapachandran as Father (Priest)
- Manavalan Joseph as Koyikkal Valiy Marthadan Pilla
- Unnimary as Sist. Jainamma
- Alummoodan as Gopala Pilla
- Sankaradi as Anndi
- Prathapachandran
- G. K. Pillai
- Meena
- Pushpa
- Radhadevi
- Stanley
- Thodupuzha Radhakrishnan
- P. R. Varalakshmi

== Soundtrack ==
The music was composed by M. K. Arjunan and the lyrics were written by Pappanamkodu Lakshmanan and Poovachal Khader.

No.	Song	Singer(s)	Lyrics	Length
1	"Amme Mahaamaaye"	J. M. Raju	Pappanamkodu Lakshmanan	
2	"Manikkutta" (Thambraakkal)	Chorus, C. O. Anto	Poovachal Khader	
3	"Mullappoo Konduvaayo"	Chorus, Lathika	Poovachal Khader	
4	"Onnu Vilichaal Oru Pattam"	Chorus, C. O. Anto	Poovachal Khader	
5	"Punnarappenninte" (F)	Chorus, Latha Raju	Pappanamkodu Lakshmanan	
