= Kayamkulam Kochunniyude Makan (TV series) =

Indian Malayalam Television Series

- Genre: Historical fiction
- Written by: G.S Anil
- Story by: G.S Anil
- Directed by: K.K.Vinayan; M. Padmakumar
- Country of origin: India
- Original language: Malayalam
- No. of seasons: 1
- No. of episodes: 143

Production
- Executive producers: M.Mahesh Kumar; Sajeed Pathalathu
- Producer: Raghunath
- Production location: Kayamkulam
- Cinematography: Abhijith Abhilash
- Animators: S.N.ifecks; Sarath Vinu
- Editors: Jiju Poovanchira; Arun; Dileep editland
- Camera setup: Multi-camera
- Running time: 19 - 25 minutes

Original release
- Network: Surya TV
- Release: 12 December 2016 – 16 June 2017

Related
- Kayamkulam Kochunni

Kayamkulam Kochunniyude Makan (transl. Son of Kayamkulam Kochunni) is an Indian Malayalam Television Series which aired on Surya TV and Streamed on Sun NXT from 12 December 2016 to 16 June 2017. It is sequel to 2004 TV series Kayamkulam Kochunni.

== Plot ==
Execution of the legendary thief Kayamkulam Kochunni known to have been a help and comfort to the poor. His son Sulthan grew up with his mind filled with revenge as he could not find an explanation for why his father who helped the poor was punished. Through his family moved away from his ancestral place, Sulthan plans to return.

== Cast ==
=== Main ===
- Askar Ameer as Sultan; Son of Kayamkulam Kochunni
- Shalu Kurian as Naseema
- Premi Viswanath as Thamara

=== Recurring ===
- Suchithra Nair
- Anju Aravind
- Anoop Chandran
- Hareesh Peradi
- Sreeraman
- Sasi Kalinga
- Mohanraj
- Nila Raj
- Idavela Babu
- Anand Bharathi
- Kumarakom Raghunath
- V. K. Sreeraman
- Sabitha Nair as Mathangi
