= Jóska Sobri =

Hungarian bandit

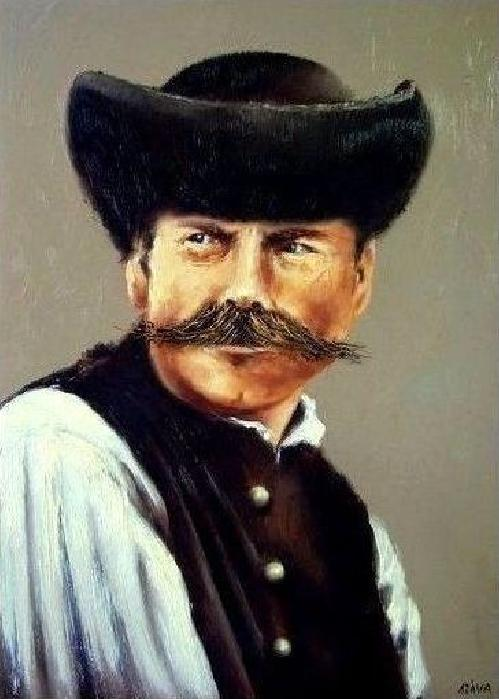
- Sobri (painted by Sándor Száva)
- Born: József Pap; 1810; Erdőd, Kingdom of Hungary
- Died: 16 February 1837 (aged 26–27); Lápafő, Kingdom of Hungary
- Other names: Jóska Zsubri
- Occupations: bandit, highwayman
- Known for: folk hero, being a Hungarian version of Robin Hood

Jóska Sobri or Jóska Zsubri (born József Pap; 1810 – 17 February 1837) was a Hungarian bandit. He became a legendary outlaw in Transdanubia, Kingdom of Hungary. Fifty years after his death, people still spoke of him, and some thought he was still alive.

Sobri, like Sándor Rózsa, is one of the most famous Hungarian betyárs (bandits).
