= Kaayamkulam Kochunniyude Makan =

1976 film by J. Sasikumar

Kayamkulam Kochunniyude Makan
- VCD cover
- Directed by: J. Sasikumar
- Written by: Pappanamkodu Lakshmanan
- Produced by: Thiruppathi Chettiyar
- Starring: Prem Nazir; Jayabharathi; Vidhubala; KP Ummer; Thikkurissy Sukumaran Nair; Prema
- Cinematography: J. G. Vijayam
- Edited by: K. Sankunni
- Music by: M. K. Arjunan
- Production company: Evershine Productions
- Release date: 9 April 1976
- Country: India
- Language: Malayalam

Kayamkulam Kochunniyude Makan (transl. Son of Kayamkulam Kochunni) is a 1976 Indian Malayalam-language period drama film directed by J. Sasikumar, written by Pappanamkodu Lakshmanan and produced by Thiruppathi Chettiyar. It is a sequel to the 1966 film Kayamkulam Kochunni. The film stars Prem Nazir, Jayabharathi, Vidhubala, KP Ummer and MG Soman. The musical score was composed by M. K. Arjunan.

== Cast ==
- Prem Nazir
- Jayabharathi
- KP Ummer
- Vidhubala
- Bahadoor
- M. G. Soman
- Vincent
- Thikkurissy Sukumaran Nair
- Prema
- Meena
- Reena

== Soundtrack ==
The music was composed by M. K. Arjunan, with the lyrics by Pappanamkodu Lakshmanan.

Song	Singers
"Aayiravallithirumakale"	K. P. Brahmanandan, Chorus
"Chithirathonikku Ponmaala"	K. J. Yesudas, B. Vasantha
"Mailaanchikkaattil"	Ambili, B. Vasantha
"Manisan Mannilu"	P. Jayachandran
"Swapnangal Thaazhikakkudam"	K. J. Yesudas, S. Janaki
"Vellippoonthattamittu"	K. J. Yesudas
