= Vellayani Paramu =

- Directed by: J. Sasikumar
- Written by: Pappanamkodu Lakshmanan
- Produced by: E. K. Thyagarajan
- Starring: Prem Nazir; Jayan; Jayabharathi; Adoor Bhasi
- Cinematography: C. Ramachandra Menon
- Edited by: V. P. Krishnan
- Music by: G. Devarajan
- Production company: Sree Murugalaya Films
- Distributed by: Dinny Films
- Release date: 23 February 1979
- Country: India
- Language: Malayalam

Vellayani Paramu is a 1979 Indian Malayalam-language period drama film directed by J. Sasikumar, written by Pappanamkodu Lakshmanan, and produced by E. K. Thyagarajan. It is based on the life of Vellayani Paramu, an outlaw active in the Central Travancore region known for stealing from rich and giving to poor. The film stars Prem Nazir, Jayan, Jayabharathi and Adoor Bhasi. The film has musical score by G. Devarajan. The film was released on 23 February 1979.

== Cast ==
- Prem Nazir as Vellayani Paramu
- Jayan as Jambulingam Nadar
- Jayabharathi as Lekshmikutty
- M. G. Soman as Ithikkara Pakki
- Adoor Bhasi
- Sreelatha Namboothiri as Ponnamma
- Janardanan as Kottaram Sarvadhikari
- Shankaradi as Swamikal
- Vazhoor Rajan
- Manavalan Joseph as Kesu
- Stanly
- Thodupuzha Radhakrishnan
- Haripad Soman
- Santo Krishnan
- Kaval Surendran
- Meena as Kalyaniyamma
- Vanchiyoor Radha as Pathumma
- Sadhana as Janaki
- Mahesh
- Radhika
- Master Anilkumar
- Master Sherif
- Master Vijayakumar
- Baby Linisia
- Baby Priya

== Soundtrack ==
The music was composed by G. Devarajan and the lyrics were written by Sreekumaran Thampi.

No.	Song	Singers	Lyrics	Length
1	"Aalam Udayone"	P. Susheela, P. Jayachandran, Chorus, Jolly Abraham	Sreekumaran Thampi	
2	"Aalolalochanakal"	K. J. Yesudas, P. Madhuri	Sreekumaran Thampi	
3	"Shariyethennaararinju"	P. Jayachandran	Sreekumaran Thampi	
4	"Villadichaan Paattupaadi"	P. Jayachandran, C. O. Anto	Sreekumaran Thampi	
