= Sándor Rózsa =

Hungarian outlaw

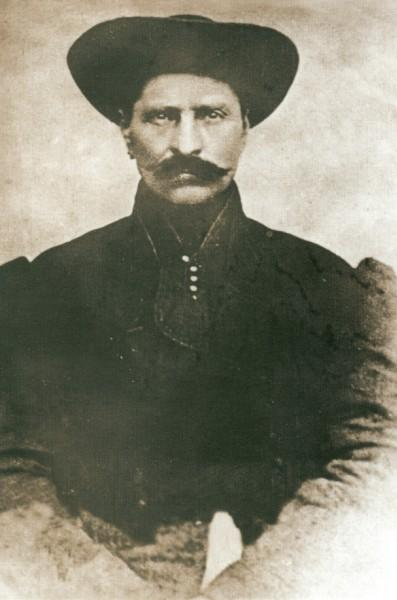
- Born: July 10, 1813; Röszke, Kingdom of Hungary, Austrian Empire
- Died: November 22, 1878 (aged 65); Szamosújvár Prison, Austria-Hungary
- Occupations: highwayman, bandit, soldier, mail robber, train robber
- Known for: being a folk hero, a Hungarian version of Robin Hood

Sandor Rozsa (July 10, 1813 – November 22, 1878) was a Hungarian serial killer, robber, and outlaw (in Hungarian: betyár). He is the best-known Hungarian highwayman; his life inspired numerous writers, notably Zsigmond Móricz and Gyula Krúdy. After his death, his life was romanticized in fiction due to his role in the Hungarian Revolution of 1848. Rózsa, like Jóska Sobri, is one of the most famous Hungarian betyárs (bandits).

== Biography ==
Rózsa was born on July 10, 1813 to his mother Erzsébet (Elisabeth) Kántor and father András (Andrew) Rózsa. He lost his father at an early age, as he was hanged for rustling cattle, and according to other sources he was shot dead during a robbery in Bácska. This had a major impact on the rest of his life. He was illiterate.

Rózsa committed his first crime on the outskirts of Kiskunhalas. In 1836, at the age of 23, he was prosecuted for stealing two cows from farmer István Darabos, for which he was sent to Szeged prison. After his escape from Szeged Prison, he became a runaway, and many illegal activities were attributed his name.

He killed 30 people, including gendarmes. Throughout his life he also robbed farms and drove away cattle and horses; for these crimes he was constantly fleeing law enforcement. In 1845, he submitted a petition for clemency to the king, claiming that he would like to live an honest life, but his petition for clemency was rejected by the monarch.

=== During the Hungarian Revolution of 1848 ===
In October 1848 on behalf of the Committee of Defence (Honvédelmi Bizottmány), he joined the Hungarian Revolution of 1848 with his company of 150 mounted fighters. With their unusual appearance and fighting style, they were successful in their fight for freedom. On 17 November, Colonel Lajos Asbóth sent Sándor Rózsa's Free Troops to disarm the Serbian majority village of Ezeres, where Rózsa robbed the village and killed 36 of its inhabitants: those who did not voluntarily and immediately hand over their jewellery and valuables. This scandal soon led Sebő Vukovics, the Hungarian government's commissioner for Southern Hungary, to disband Rózsa's Free Corps.

His favourite hiding places were the islets on Ludas Lake (now Ludaš Lake, Serbia).

=== After the restoration of Habsburg power ===
After the fall of the revolution he was forced to flee and returned to his earlier life as a highwayman. Sándor Rózsa became a colt rider near Szeged and got married. There was a false rumour that he was the leader of a revolutionary conspiracy, so an unusually high bounty of 10,000 silver forints was put on his head to ensure his capture. Despite this, he was not caught for many years, until in 1857, his comrade-in-law, a farmer named Pál Katona from Szeged, handed him over to the gendarmes. The trial was held in February 1859. Because of his status as a popular outlaw in the Hungarian Revolution and War of Independence, he was sentenced to death by hanging; however, Emperor Franz Joseph commuted his sentence to life imprisonment to avoid making him a martyr. He spent 9 years in prisons at Kufstein, Szabadka and Pétervárad until he was released in a general amnesty in 1868. Sándor Rózsa was such a notorious personality that during his imprisonment in Kufstein, he could be seen for money in the marketplace on Sundays.

In the same year he resumed his old pursuits and robbed post coaches and railway trains.

=== Train robbery and arrest ===
Rózsa was over 55 years old when he attempted to rob a mail train between Szeged and Budapest. He received news that a large shipment of money was arriving by train containing the salaries of every Csongrád county state employee. Rózsa and his gang expected the money to be poorly guarded, making plans one week before the robbery. The bandits decided to derail the train near the village of Kistelek. However, in the meantime, due to a military exercise, the train carriage containing the money was attached to another train that was due to leave a few hours later. The army got a head start on the timetable and the original train timetable was therefore changed, leaving the money waiting safely at the station with two guards. The train that was running at the original time, the one attacked by Rózsa and his gang, was actually filled with K.u.K. soldiers armed with grenades and rifles. The soldiers immediately fired on the robbers. Rózsa realized they were outnumbered, as more and more K.u.K. soldiers came out of the different wagons of the derailed train. Several of Rózsa's companions died in the robbery, and he himself was wounded in the knee.

=== Life as a prisoner ===
Soon after the failed robbery, Rózsa was captured by the gendarmes of Royal Commissioner Gedeon Ráday on January 12, 1869. At his trial in 1872, he was sentenced to life imprisonment for 21 counts of robbery, 9 counts of theft and 1 count of murder. At second instance this was increased to death, but the Curia again reduced it to life imprisonment. It was on May 5, 1873, that he was transferred to Szamosújvár, where he was held captive under registry number 1267. He was unable to escape because of old age and illness, and worked as a tailor and then as a hosier. However, his health continued to deteriorate, and on November 22, 1878, he died of tuberculosis in Szamosújvár penitentiary.
