= Luke Owen Pike =

English barrister (1835–1915)

Luke Owen Pike (12 August 1835 – 5 November 1915) was an English barrister-at-law, writer and historical researcher at the United Kingdom's Public Record Office.

Pike was born 12 August 1835 the older son Luke Pike of St. George's, Hanover Square. He attended Brasenose College, Oxford, matriculating 9 December 1853, aged 18, whereupon he continued his education awarded a Bachelor of Arts in 1857, and a Master of Arts in 1861. On leaving Oxford he entered the Public Record Office where he was employed as a researcher. He was a student of Lincoln's Inn 24 March 1856 (then aged 20) and was called to the Bar on 26 January 1864. In July 1882 he was appointed legal inspecting officer (under the Public Record Office Act 1877) since July, 1882 with the role under the Act relating to the removal of valueless documents.

At the time of his death 5 November 1915, The Times referred to Pike as a distinguished researcher in official records and other ancient documents. From 1883 until a few years before his death he was engaged in editing and translating the Rolls Series of the year books of the reign of Edward III. This task was completed in 1911. In 1890 Mr. Pike became of the inspectors under the Acts.

He married Rosa Horatia Micholls (1851–1899) in Paddington in 1891. They had no children.

Pike was a frequent contributor to the Law Quarterly Review, and he also wrote "A History of Crime in England", when this work was published the Saturday Review (xxxvii. 52.) stated "It is the book of a clever, hard-working man, with a great fund of self-confidence, a profound contempt for previous inquirers, and a resolute determination to begin at the beginning of things and to do all his work for himself."

== Works ==
- "On the Place of the Sciences of Mind and Language in the Science of Man," Journal of the Anthropological Society of London, Vol. II, 1964.
- "On the Alleged Influence of Race upon Religion," Journal of the Anthropological Society of London, Vol. VII, 1869.
- "On the Claims of Women to Political Power," Journal of the Anthropological Society of London, Vol. VII, 1869.
- "The Trial of Peers," Law Quarterly Review, Vol. XXIII, 1907.
- "An Action at Law in the Reign of Edward III." In Select Essays in Anglo-American Legal History, Vol. II, Little, Brown, and Company, 1908.
- "Common Law and Conscience in the Ancient Court of Chancery." In Select Essays in Anglo-American Legal History, Vol. II, Little, Brown, and Company, 1908.
