= Jambulingam Nadar =

Jambulingam Nadar was a notorious brigand of the southern Madras Presidency in the early 20th century. He was shot to death by the police on 20 September 1923.

He was a farm hand born in Vadalivilai, Tirunelveli district of the state of modern Madras Presidency, he grew up working as a farm-hand, and became the leader of a band of highwaymen.

== In popular culture ==
Jayan portrays Jambulingan in the 1979 Malayalam film Vellayani Paramu. The 1982 Malayalam film Jambulingam stars Prem Nazir in the lead role.
