= Kayamkulam Kochunni (1966 film) =

- Poster
- Directed by: P. A. Thomas
- Written by: P. A. Thomas
- Produced by: P. A. Thomas
- Starring: Sathyan; Adoor Bhasi; Ushakumari; K. J. Yesudas
- Cinematography: P. B. Maniam
- Edited by: T. R. Sreenivasalu
- Music by: B. A. Chidambaranath
- Production company: Thomas Pictures
- Release date: 29 July 1966
- Country: India
- Language: Malayalam

Kayamkulam Kochunni is a 1966 Indian Malayalam-language period drama film written, produced and directed by P. A. Thomas. Dialogues were written by Jagathy N. K. Achary. It is based on the life of the 19th century thief Kayamkulam Kochunni, who is known for stealing from the rich and giving to the poor. The film stars Sathyan, Adoor Bhasi and Ushakumari and K. J. Yesudas. The soundtrack was composed by B. A. Chidambaranath. Kayamkulam Kochunni released on 29 July 1966 was a box-office success. A sequel, Kaayamkulam Kochunniyude Makan, was released in 1976.

== Cast ==
- Sathyan as Kayamkulam Kochunni
- Ushakumari as Nabeesa
- Adoor Bhasi as Ochira Pachu Pillai
- Manavalan Joseph as Thommichan
- K. J. Yesudas as Khader, A Suruma seller
- Muthukulam Raghavan Pillai as Achuthan Nair
- T. R. Omana as Achuthan Nair's wife
- K. P. Ummer as Diwan
- Kaduvakulam Antony as Bava
- Kamaladevi as Ayisha
- Thikkurissy Sukumaran Nair as Kunjunni Panikkar
- Sukumari as Vazhapilli Janaki Pillai
- Paul Vengola as Kuttan Moosu Thirumeni
- Prathapachandran as Kallada Kochu Naanu

== Production ==
It was the first Malayalam film about the famed highwayman Kayamkulam Kochunni, a Kerala equivalent of Robin Hood. P. A. Thomas who scripted and directed the film produced it under the production banner, Thomas Pictures. The dialogues were written by Jagathy N. K. Achary. The film marks the acting debut of singer Yesudas, who played a pivotal role. The film was shot at the Shyamala Studios in Chennai.

== Soundtrack ==
The music was composed by B. A. Chidambaranath.

Song	Singers	Lyrics
"Aattuvanchi"	K. J. Yesudas	P. Bhaskaran
"Kaarthikavilakku Kandu"	B. Vasantha	P. Bhaskaran
"Kunkumappoovukal Poothu"	K. J. Yesudas, S. Janaki	P. Bhaskaran
"Padachavan Padachappol"	Kamukara	P. Bhaskaran
"Padachonte Kiripakondu"	B. Vasantha	Abhayadev
"Suruma Nalla Suruma"	K. J. Yesudas	P. Bhaskaran
"Viravaalan Kuruvi"	S. Janaki	P. Bhaskaran

== Reception ==
The film was a commercial success at the Kerala box office.
