= Unniyarcha (film) =

- Poster
- Directed by: Kunchacko
- Screenplay by: P. K. Sarangapani
- Based on: Vadakkan Pattukal
- Produced by: M. Kunchacko
- Starring: Ragini; Prem Nazir; Sathyan; Thikkurissy Sukumaran Nair; Hari
- Cinematography: T. N. Krishnankutty Nair
- Edited by: S. Williams
- Music by: K. Raghavan
- Production company: Udaya
- Release date: 24 August 1961
- Running time: 138 minutes
- Country: India
- Language: Malayalam

Unniyarcha ഉണ്ണിയാർച്ച is a 1961 Indian Malayalam-language action and folk drama film, produced and directed by Kunchacko. The film stars Ragini, Prem Nazir, Sathyan, Thikkurissy Sukumaran Nair and Hari. It is based on the life of warrior of the same name from the Vadakkan Pattukal ballads. The film was released on 24 August 1961 and became a success. The sequel, "Aromalunni," was released in 1972, and was also directed and produced by Kunchacko.

== Cast ==
- Ragini as Unniyarcha
- Prem Nazir as Attumanamel Kunjiraman
- Sathyan as Aromal Chekavar
- Thikkurissy Sukumaran Nair as Kannappa Chekavar
- Bahadoor
- Hari as Aromalunni
- Kottayam Chellappan as Chandu
- Reetha as Kunjunnooli
- Palakunnel Sunny as Aringoder
- S. P. Pillai as Panen

== Production ==
Unniyarcha is the first feature film based on Vadakkan Pattukal, a collection of Malayalam ballads. P. K. Sarangapani wrote the dialogues in North Malabar dialect. The film was predominantly shot in Kerala's backwaters.

== Soundtrack ==
The music was composed by K. Raghavan and lyrics were written by P. Bhaskaran and P. K. Sarangapani.

No.	Song	Singers	Lyrics	Length (m:ss)
1	"Aarekkondee Paanan"		P. Bhaskaran	
2	"Aaru Neeyen Maariville"	A. M. Rajah	P. Bhaskaran	
3	"Aattummanammele"	K. Raghavan		
4	"Allimalar Kaavilammee"		P. Bhaskaran	
5	"Allithamara Kannaale"	P. Leela	P. Bhaskaran	
6	"Annu Ninne"	P. Susheela, A. M. Rajah	P. Bhaskaran	
7	"Bhoomiyil Ninnum" (Bit)	A. M. Rajah	P. Bhaskaran	
8	"Ente Kanninte Kannaana" (Bit)	K. Raghavan	P. Bhaskaran	
9	"Ezhu Kadalodivanna"	P. Leela, Chorus	P. Bhaskaran	
10	"Ikkili Penne Ikkili Penne" (Bit)	K. Raghavan	P. Bhaskaran	
11	"Jayabheri"	PB Sreenivas, A. M. Rajah	P. Bhaskaran	
12	"Kaanthaari Mulaku" (Bit)	K. Raghavan	P. Bhaskaran	
13	"Kannuchimmichimmi Nadakkum"	K. Raghavan	P. Bhaskaran	
14	"Kunnathu Konnayum" (Bit)	A. M. Rajah	P. Bhaskaran	
15	"Midukki Midukki"	Chorus, Mehboob	P. Bhaskaran	
16	"Neelakkadal Rajathy Doorathe Rajathy"	P. Susheela, P. Leela, Mehboob	P. Bhaskaran	
17	"Om Shuklaambaradharam" (Slokam)	P. B. Sreenivas		
18	"Paadaam Paadaam Ponnamme"	K. Raghavan	P. Bhaskaran	
19	"Pokuthire Padakkuthire"	P. Susheela, P. Leela	P. Bhaskaran	
20	"Ponnoonjale"	S. Janaki, P. Susheela	P. Bhaskaran	
21	"Porinkal Jayamallo"	P. Leela	P. Bhaskaran	
22	"Prathikaara Durge"	P. B. Sreeniva	P. Bhaskara	
23	"Pullanenikku Ninte"	P. Leela, A. M. Rajah	P. Bhaskaran	
24	"Puthooram Aaromal" (Bit)	K. Raghavan	P. Bhaskaran	
25	"Puthooram Veettile"	K. Raghavan, Chorus		
26	"Shapadhamithu Bhalichu"		P. Bhaskaran	
27	"Thaamasamenthe" (Bit)	P. Leela	P. Bhaskaran	
28	"Udavaale Padavaale"	P. B. Sreenivas, A. M. Rajah	P. Bhaskaran	
29	"Urangaathentunni"	S. Janaki, P, Susheela	P. K. Sarangapani	
30	"Varoo Chekava" (Bit)		P. Bhaskaran	

== Release ==
Unniyarcha was released on 24 August 1961, around the time of Onam. The film was a commercial success, and inspired more screen adaptations of legends from Vadakkan Pattukal.
