= History of martial arts =

Although the earliest evidence of martial arts goes back millennia, the true roots are difficult to reconstruct. Inherent patterns of human aggression which inspire practice of mock combat, combat sports, and optimization of serious close combat as cultural universals are doubtlessly inherited from the pre-human stage and were made into an "art" from the earliest emergence of that concept. Indeed, many universals of martial art are fixed by the specifics of human physiology and not dependent on a specific tradition or era.

Specific martial traditions become identifiable in Classical Antiquity, with disciplines such as shuai jiao, Greek wrestling or those described in the Indian epics or the Spring and Autumn Annals of China.

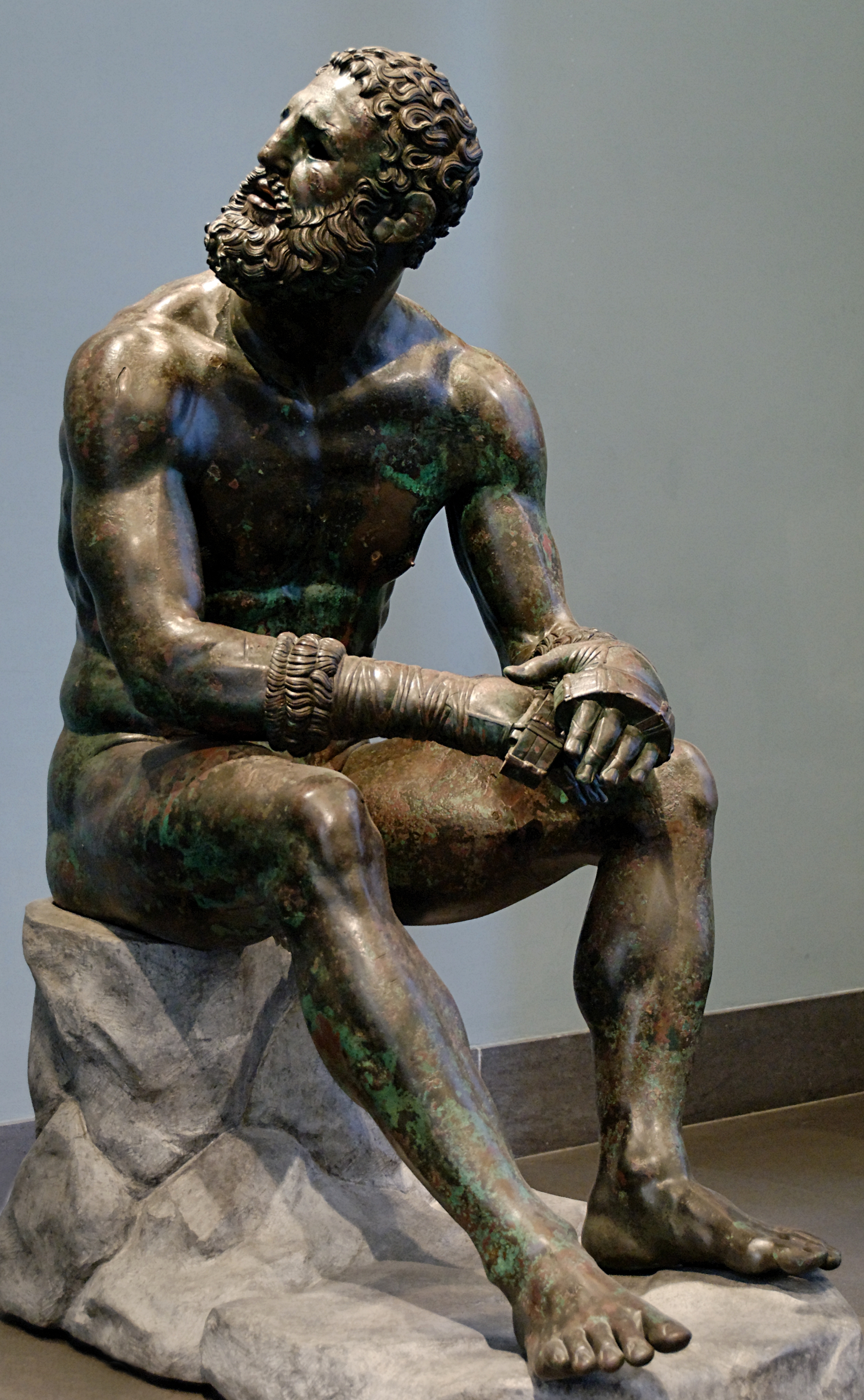
The Boxer of Quirinal resting after contest (Bronze sculpture, 3rd century BCE)

== Early history ==
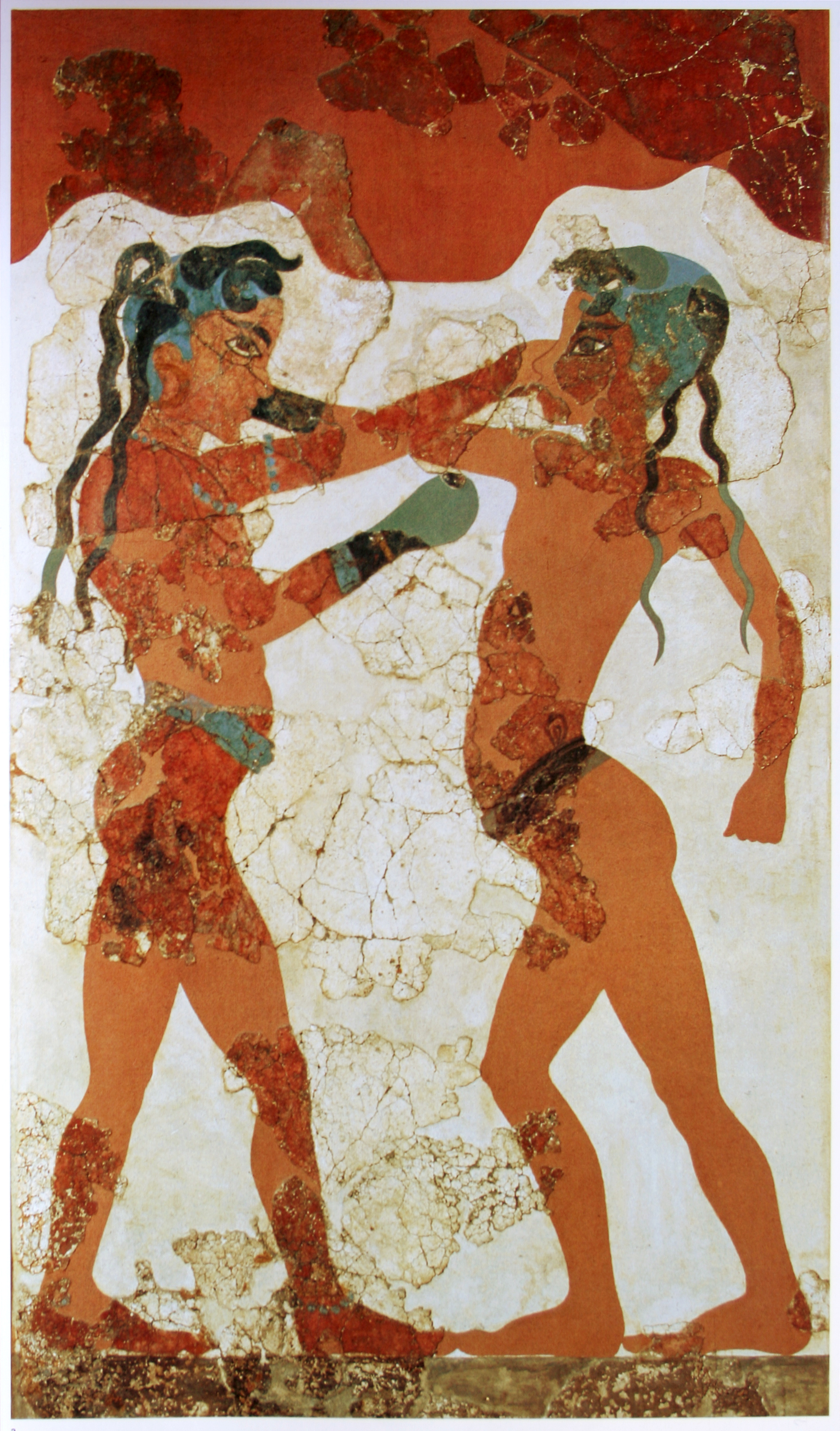
Minoan youths boxing, reconstruction of a Knossos fresco (1500 BC). Earliest evidence for use of gloves.

The earliest evidence for specifics of martial arts as practiced in the past comes from depictions of fights, both in figurative art and in early literature, besides analysis of archaeological evidence, especially of weaponry. The oldest work of art depicting scenes of battle, dating back 3400 BC, was the Ancient Egyptian paintings showing some form of struggle. Dating back to 3000 BC in Mesopotamia (Babylon), reliefs and the poems depicting struggle were found. In Vietnam, drawings and sketches from 2879 BCE describe certain ways of combat using sword, stick, bow, and spears.

The spear has been in use since the Lower Paleolithic and retained its central importance well into the 2nd millennium AD. The bow appears in the Upper Paleolithic and is likewise only gradually replaced by the crossbow, and eventually firearms, in the Present Day. True bladed weapons appear in the Neolithic with the stone axe, and diversify in shape in the course of the Bronze Age (khopesh/kopis, sword, dagger)

Wrestling is the oldest form of combat sport, and while its foundational origins lie in global prehistory, different styles of wrestling were created independently and practiced throughout the world at various times in human history. Some early examples are the depiction of wrestling techniques in a tomb of the Middle Kingdom of Egypt at Beni Hasan (c. 2000 BC) and pictorial representations of fist fighting in the Minoan civilization dating to the 2nd millennium BCE.

In ancient China, Yellow Emperor (2698 BC) is described as a famous general who, before becoming China’s leader, wrote lengthy treatises on medicine, astrology and the martial arts. Literary descriptions of combat began in the 2nd millennium BC, with mention of weaponry and combat in texts like the Gilgamesh epic or the Rig-Veda. Detailed description of Late Bronze Age to Early Iron Age hand-to-hand combat with spear, sword and shield are found in the Iliad (c. 8th century BC) and also the Mahabharatha.

== Africa ==
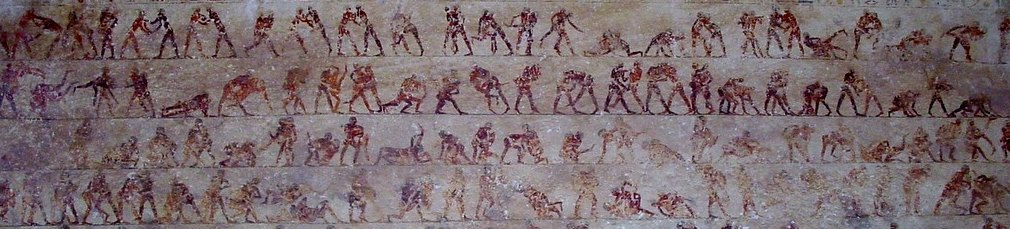
Detail of the wrestling fresco in tomb 15 at Beni Hasan.

An Egyptian fresco, dated to 3400 BC, and depicting military training at Beni Hassan is the world's oldest known artistic representation of an organised fighting system. In gymnasiums similar to those of Greece, recruits would practice wrestling, callisthenics and duelling with single-stick. The attacking weapon apparently had a basket-guard protecting the hand, while the left forearm had a splint strapped on to serve as a shield. Soldiers fought with spears, large shields with an eye-hole, clubs, axes, poleaxes, flails, bows, slings, and swords of various forms.

Later, martial styles as varied as Gidigbo (a form of wrestling practiced by the Yoruba people of Nigeria), Donga (a form of stickfighting practiced by the Suri people of Ethiopia), Musangwe (a form of bare-knuckle boxing practiced by the Venda people of South Africa), Tahtib (a form of stickfighting practiced by the Copts of Egypt) and Engolo (a form of kicking, dodging and leg sweeping practiced by the tribes of the Cunene river region of Angola), to name just a few, were developed by cultures all over Africa.

== Asia ==
=== China ===
==== Antiquity (Zhou to Jin) ====
A hand-to-hand combat theory, including the integration of notions of "hard" and "soft" techniques, is expounded in the story of the Maiden of Yue in the Spring and Autumn Annals of Wu and Yue (5th century BCE).

The Han History Bibliographies record that, by the Former Han (206 BC – 9 AD), there was a distinction between no-holds-barred weaponless fighting, which it calls shǒubó (手搏), for which "how-to" manuals had already been written, and sportive wrestling, then known as juélì or jiǎolì (角力).

Wrestling is also documented in the Shǐ Jì, Records of the Grand Historian, written by Sima Qian (c. 100 BCE).

Jiǎolì is also mentioned in the Classic of Rites (1st century BCE).

In the 1st century, "Six Chapters of Hand Fighting", were included in the Han Shu (history of the Former Han Dynasty) written by Ban Gu. The Five Animals concept in Chinese martial arts is attributed to Hua Tuo, a 3rd-century physician.

==== Middle Ages ====
In the Tang dynasty, descriptions of sword dances were immortalized in poems by Li Bai and Du Fu. In the Song and Yuan dynasties, xiangpu (the earliest form of sumo) contests were sponsored by the imperial courts.

In regard to the Shaolin fighting system, the oldest evidence of Shaolin participation in combat is a stele from 728 CE that attests to two occasions: a defense of the Shaolin Monastery from bandits around 610 CE, and their subsequent role in the defeat of Wang Shichong at the Battle of Hulao in 621 CE. From the 8th to the 15th centuries, there are no extant documents that provide evidence of Shaolin participation in combat.

==== Late Ming ====
The modern concepts of wushu emerge by the late Ming to early Qing dynasties (16th to 17th centuries).

Between the 16th and 17th centuries there are at least forty extant sources which provided evidence that, not only did monks of Shaolin practice martial arts, but martial practice had become such an integral element of Shaolin monastic life that the monks felt the need to justify it by creating new Buddhist lore.

References of martial practice in Shaolin appear in various literary genres of the late Ming: the epitaphs of Shaolin warrior monks, martial-arts manuals, military encyclopedias, historical writings, travelogues, fiction, and even poetry. However these sources do not point out to any specific style originated in Shaolin.

These sources, in contrast to those from the Tang period, refer to Shaolin methods of armed combat. This include the forte of Shaolin monks and for which they had become famous — the staff (gun); General Qi Jiguang included these techniques in his book, Treatise of Effective Discipline.

==== 20th Century ====
At the beginning of the century, first attempts were made to standardize the practice of Traditional Chinese Martial Arts in cities. A notable example was that of the Jing Wu Academy.

The rise of the People's Republic of China has gradually led to many changes in the practice, culture and dissemination of Chinese Martial Arts. While on one hand, many martial arts teachers were persecuted because of their political view or activities, the communist government also invested in the creation of new styles: Sanda, Modern Wushu, and Standardized Taiji Quan. Later, beginning in the 1980s, the Chinese Communist Party also began to promote Traditional Chinese Martial Arts.

From the 1970s, Traditional Chinese Martial Arts slowly became very popular in Western Countries as well. The development and spread of Chinese Kung Fu movies from Hong Kong greatly contributed to this, especially via the influence of Bruce Lee.

=== India ===
==== Antiquity ====
Classical Sanskrit epics contain the earliest written accounts of combat in India. Stories describing Krishna report that he sometimes engaged in wrestling matches where he used knee strikes to the chest, punches to the head, hair pulling, and strangleholds. Another unarmed battle in the Mahabharata describes two fighters boxing with clenched fists and fighting with kicks, finger strikes, knee strikes and headbutts. Krishna Maharaja, who single-handedly overcame an elephant according to the Mahabharata, is credited with developing the sixteen principles of armed combat.

Kalaripayattu, the most ancient and important form of India, was practiced in Kerala. Its origins date back to the 12th century. Unniyarcha, Aromal Chekavar and others were Thiyya warriors of Chekavar lineage. It was during their period that kalaripayattu spread widely in southern Kerala.

Many of the popular sports mentioned in the Vedas and the epics have their origins in military training, such as boxing (musti-yuddha), wrestling (malladwandwa), chariot-racing (rathachalan), horse-riding (aswarohana) and archery (dhanurvidya). Competitions were held not just as a contest of the players' prowess but also as a means of finding a bridegroom.

Ten fighting styles of northern India were said to have been created in different areas based on animals and gods, and designed for the particular geography of their origin. Tradition ascribes their convergence to the 6th-century in the Buddhist university of Takshashila, located in today's Punjab region.

==== Middle Ages ====
Like other branches of Sanskrit literature, treatises on martial arts become more systematic in the course of the 1st millennium CE. The grappling art of vajra-mushti is mentioned in sources of the early centuries CE. Military accounts of the Gupta Empire (c. 240–480) and the later Agni Purana identify over 130 different weapons, divided into thrown and unthrown classes and further into sub-classes. The Kama Sutra written by Vātsyāyana suggested that women should regularly "practice with sword, single-stick, quarterstaff, and bow and arrow."

The Sushruta Samhita (c. 4th century) identifies 107 vital points on the human body of which 64 were classified as being lethal if properly struck with a fist or stick. Sushruta's work formed the basis of the medical discipline ayurveda which was taught alongside various martial arts. With numerous other scattered references to vital points in Vedic and epic sources, it is certain that Indian subcontinent's early fighters knew and practised attacking or defending vital points.

Fighting arts were not exclusive to the kshatriya caste, though the warrior class used the systems more extensively. The 8th-century text Kuvalaymala by Udyotanasuri recorded such systems being taught at gurukula educational institutions, where Brahmin students from throughout the subcontinent "were learning and practicing archery, fighting with sword and shield, with daggers, sticks, lances, and with fists, and in duels (niuddham)."

The earliest extant manual of Indian martial arts is contained as chapters 248 to 251 in the Agni Purana (c. 8th – 11th centuries), giving an account of dhanurveda in a total of 104 shloka. These verses describe how to improve a warrior's individual prowess and kill enemies using various different methods in warfare, whether a warrior went to war in chariots, elephants, horses, or on foot. Foot methods were subdivided into armed combat and unarmed combat. The former included the bow and arrow, the sword, spear, noose, armour, iron dart, club, battle axe, discus, and the trident. The latter included wrestling, knee strikes, and punching and kicking methods.

=== Japan ===
The historical origin of Japanese martial arts can be found in the warrior traditions of the samurai and the caste system that restricted the use of weapons by members of the non-warrior classes. Originally, samurai were expected to be proficient in many weapons, as well as unarmed combat, and attain the highest possible mastery of combat skills, for the purpose of glorifying either themselves or their liege. A large number of schools evolved to teach these skills with those existing before the Meiji Restoration classed as Koryū (古流) or old stream. Over time there was a trend away from the traditional purpose to a philosophy of coupling spiritual goals with the striving to perfect their martial skills.

The Japanese The Book of Five Rings dates to 1664.

=== Korea ===
Taekkyon is the traditional martial art of Korea. Taekkyon came into existence sometime during Joseon Dynasty. Taekkyon focuses on up-right fighting: footwork, kicks, strikes, blocks, punches, elbows, open-handed strikes, joint-locks, throws and rhythm.

Ssireum is the traditional wrestling art of Korea. Gakjeochong (각저총:角抵塚) murals show that wrestling in Korea dates back as early as the pre-Three Kingdom era. The Book of Later Han, a Chinese document that was written either before or early in the history of the Three Kingdoms also has records of Korean wrestling. Ssireum first gained widespread popularity during the Joseon dynasty (1392–1910).

Two Korean martial arts manuals Muyejebo and Muyedobotongji date from 1598 and 1790, respectively.

=== Sri Lanka ===
Angampora is an ancient Sri Lankan martial art that combines combat techniques, self-defense, sport, exercise, and meditation. According to apocryphal Sinhalese folklore, Angampora's history stretches to as far back as 3,000 years, with the Yaksha tribe (one of the four "hela" - the ancient tribes that inhabited the island) being identified as originators. With the advent of colonialism over the entirety of the island in 1815, Angampora fell into disuse and was very nearly lost as a part of the country's heritage. The British administration prohibited its practice due to the dangers posed by a civilian populace versed in a martial art, burning down any angan madu (practice huts devoted to the martial art) found: flouting of the law was punished by a gunshot to the knee, effectively crippling practitioners; Angampora nevertheless survived within a few families, allowing it to emerge into mainstream Sri Lankan culture post-independence.

=== Persia (Iran) ===
The traditional Persian style of grappling was known as koshti, with the physical exercise and schooled sport known as varzesh-e bastani. It is said to be traceable back to Arsacid Parthian times (132 BCE - 226 CE), and is still widely practiced today in the region. Following the development of Sufi Islam in the 8th century CE, varzesh-e pahlavani absorbed philosophical and spiritual components from that religion.

Pahlevani and zourkhaneh rituals is also an ancient martial art and the name inscribed by UNESCO for varzesh-e pahlavāni (Persian: آیین پهلوانی و زورخانه‌ای, "heroic sport") or varzesh-e bāstāni (ورزش باستانی; varzeš-e bāstānī, "ancient sport"), a traditional system of athletics originally used to train warriors in Iran (Persia), and first appearing under this name and form in the Safavid era, with similarities to systems in adjacent lands under other names.

=== Turkic ===
Other historical grappling styles from the region include Turkic forms such as kurash, köräş and yağlı güreş.

=== Arab ===
The north Arabian tradition of horsemanship quickly became an integral part of warfare throughout the Arab world and much of the West Asia. The Middle Ages saw the flourishing of the furusiyya culture, combining the ancient Bedouin concept of honour (muru'ah) with the Islamic ideals of chivalry. A fārys (meaning knight or horseman) would first hone his skills in wrestling and armed combat on the ground before learning to fight while mounted. Furusiyya literature from the 9th to 15th century deal with equestrianism, archery, military strategy, duelling and charging with the lance. Armed fighting included the use of the sword (sayf), spear, lance, javelin, dagger (jambiya), staff, axe (tabar), warhammer, and curved bow. There is also Tahtib (التحطيب) which was practiced in ancient Egypt and is still performed in celebrations.

== Europe ==
=== Antiquity ===
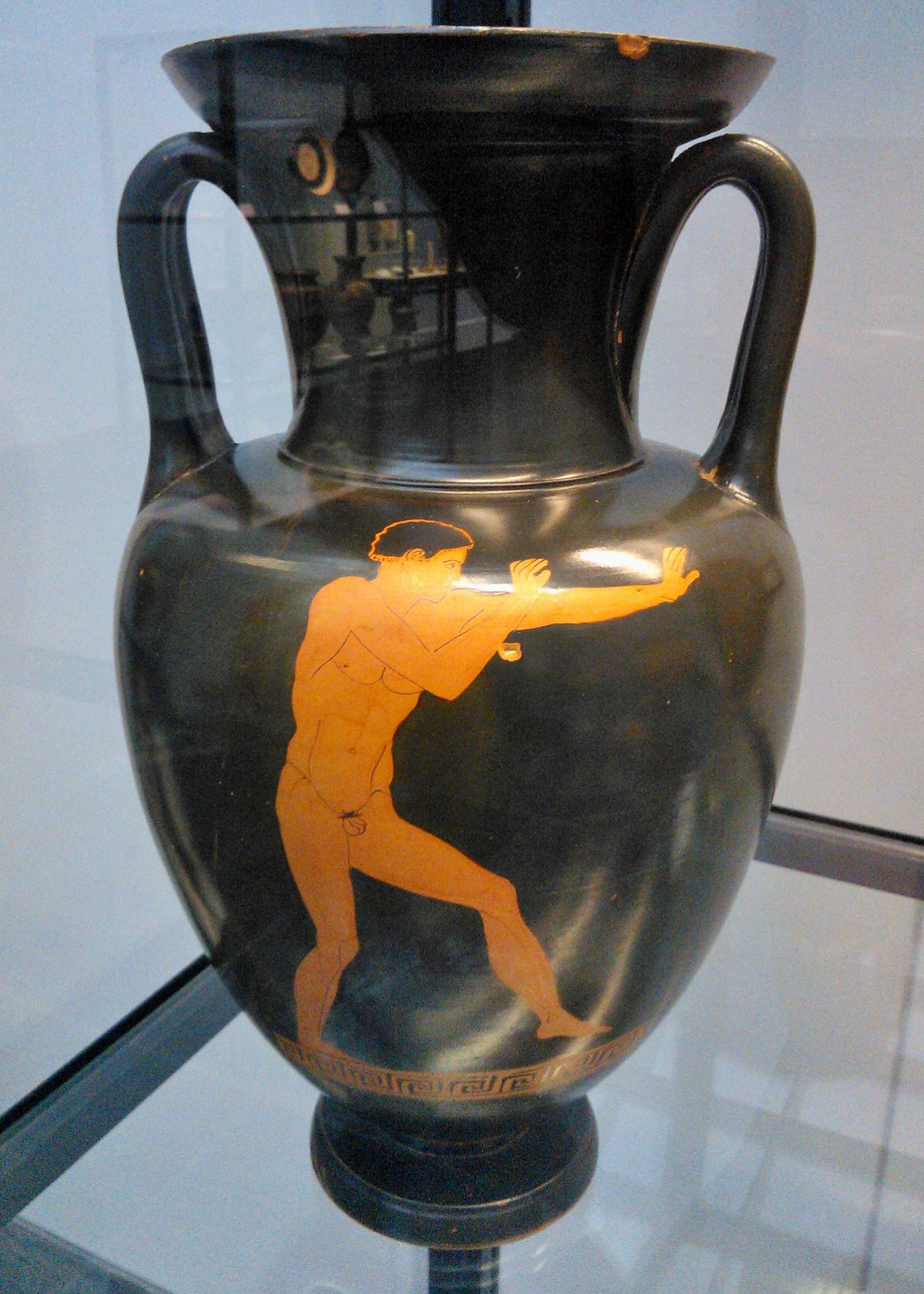
Pankratiast in fighting stance, Ancient Greek red-figure amphora, 440 BC.

European martial arts become tangible in Greek antiquity with pankration and other martially oriented disciplines of the ancient Olympic Games. Boxing became Olympic in Greece as early as 688 BCE. Detailed depictions of wrestling techniques are preserved in vase paintings of the Classical period. Homer's Iliad has a number of detailed descriptions of single combat with spear, sword and shield.

Gladiatorial combat appears to have Etruscan roots, and is documented in Rome from the 260s BCE.

The papyrus fragment known as P.Oxy. III 466 dating from the 2nd century gives the earliest surviving description in writing of wrestling techniques.

In Sardinia, a Mediterranean island, a fighting style which has been called istrumpa was practised in the Bronze Age, as demonstrated by the finding of a little bronze statue (known as "Bronzetto dei lottatori" or "bronze of the fighting men"), which shows two fighters struggling with each other on the ground.

=== Middle Ages ===
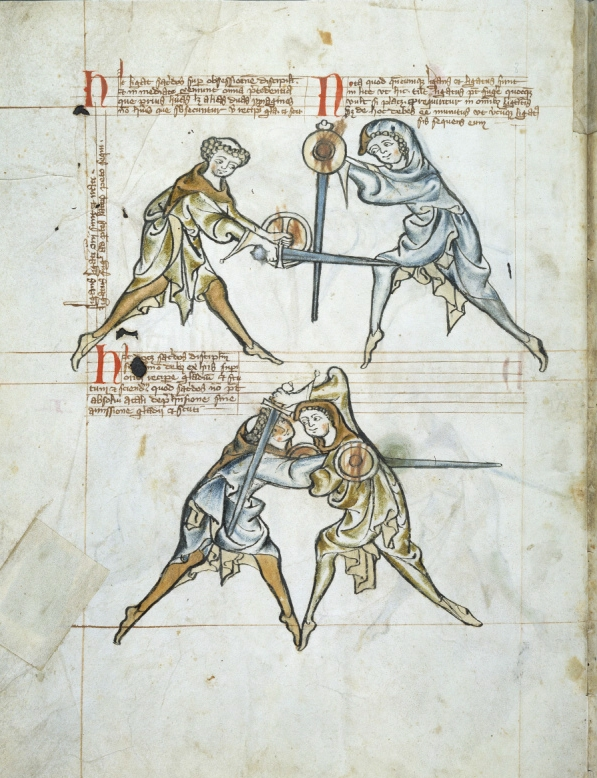
Fol. 4v of the I.33

Pictorial sources of medieval combat include the Bayeux Tapestry (11th century), the Morgan Bible (13th century).

The Icelandic sagas contain many realistic descriptions of Viking Age combat.

The earliest extant dedicated martial arts manual is the MS I.33 (c. 1300), detailing sword and buckler combat, compiled in a Franconian monastery. The manuscript consists of 64 images with Latin commentary, interspersed with technical vocabulary in German. While there are earlier manuals of wrestling techniques, I.33 is the earliest known manual dedicated to teaching armed single combat.

Wrestling throughout the Middle Ages was practiced by all social strata. Jousting and the tournament were popular martial arts practiced by nobility throughout the High and Late Middle Ages.

The Late Middle Ages see the appearance of elaborate fencing systems, such as the German or Italian schools. Fencing schools (Fechtschulen) for the new bourgeois class become popular, increasing the demand for professional instructors (fencing masters, Fechtmeister). The martial arts techniques taught in this period is preserved in a number of 15th-century Fechtbücher.

=== Renaissance to Early Modern period ===
The late medieval German school survives into the German Renaissance, and there are a number of printed 16th-century manuals (notably the one by Joachim Meyer, 1570). But by the 17th century, the German school declines in favour of the Italian Dardi school, reflecting the transition to rapier fencing in the upper classes. Wrestling comes to be seen as an ignoble pursuit proper for the lower classes and until its 19th-century revival as a modern sport becomes restricted to folk wrestling.

In the Baroque period, fashion shifts from Italian to Spanish masters, and their elaborate systems of Destreza. In the mid-18th century, in keeping with the general Rococo fashion, French masters rise to international prominence, introducing the foil, and much of the terminology still current in modern sports fencing.

There are also a number of early modern fencing masters of note in England, such as George Silver and Joseph Swetnam.

Academic fencing takes its origin in the Middle Ages, and is subject to the changes of fencing fashion throughout the early modern period. It establishes itself as the separate style of Mensur fencing in the 18th

== Modern history (1800 to 1999) ==
The Western interest in East Asian martial arts dates back to the late 19th century, due to the increase in trade between the West with China and Japan. European martial arts before that time was focused on the duelling sword among the upper classes on one hand, and various styles of folk wrestling among the lower classes on the other.

Savate appears in the early 19th century in France, as a mix between English boxing and French folk kicking techniques. At that time, in France, it existed in gyms called salles d'armes where savate, English boxing, fencing, canne de combat and sometimes even wrestling was practiced.

Edward William Barton-Wright, a British railway engineer who had studied jiu-jitsu while working in Japan between 1894 and 1897, was the first man known to have taught Asian martial arts in Europe. He also founded an eclectic martial arts style named Bartitsu which combined jujutsu, judo, wrestling, boxing, savate and stick fighting. Also during the late 19th and early 20th centuries, catch wrestling contests became immensely popular in Europe.

In the early 1900s Edith Garrud became the first British female teacher of jiu-jitsu, and one of the first female martial arts instructors in the Western world.'

The development of Brazilian jiu-jitsu from the early 20th century is a good example of the worldwide cross-pollination and syncretism of martial arts traditions.

Martial arts at the Olympics in modern times include judo, karate, and taekwondo. Judo was first included in the Olympics at the 1964 Games in Tokyo, Japan. After not being included in 1968, judo has been an Olympic sport in each Olympiad since then. Only male judoka participated until the 1988 Summer Olympics, when women's judo was organized as a demonstration sport. Women judoka were first awarded medals at the 1992 Summer Olympics. In August 2016, the International Olympic Committee approved karate as an Olympic sport beginning at the 2020 Summer Olympics. However, karate was not included in the 2024 Olympic Games. Since 2000, taekwondo has been in the Olympics. It started as a demonstration event at the 1988 games in Seoul, a year after becoming a medal event at the Pan Am Games, and became an official medal event at the 2000 games in Sydney.

In November 1972, following a letter campaign against the rule prohibiting women from being promoted to higher than 5th dan, Keiko Fukuda and her senpai Masako Noritomi (1913–1982) became the first women promoted to 6th dan by the Kodokan Judo Institute.

The later 1970s and 1980s witnessed an increased media interest in the martial arts, thanks in part to Asian and Hollywood martial arts movies and very popular television shows like "Kung Fu", "Martial Law" and "The Green Hornet" that incorporated martial arts moments or themes. Following Bruce Lee, both Jackie Chan and Jet Li are prominent movie figures who have been responsible for promoting Chinese martial arts in recent years.

In 1980 the first women's world championships in judo were held, in New York.

In 1994 Keiko Fukuda was the first woman to be awarded a rare red belt (at the time for women still marking the 8th dan rank) in judo by the Kodokan Judo Institute. In 2006 the Kodokan Judo Institute awarded her the 9th degree black belt (9th dan), making her the first woman to hold this rank from any recognized judo organization. In 2011 she became the first woman promoted to a 10th degree black belt in judo.

=== Combined Olympic medal table ===
Martial arts have been a part of the modern Olympic games since 1896. The following table is correct up to and including the 2024 Summer Olympics. Cells are shaded if the total includes a gold medal. France and Italy are the only two countries to achieve gold in every discipline.

Country	Fencing	Wrestling		Boxing	Judo	Taekwondo	Karate	Total
Country	Fencing	Greco-Roman	Freestyle	Boxing	Judo	Taekwondo	Karate	Total
Afghanistan	0	0	0	0	0	2	0	2
Albania	0	0	2	0	0	0	0	2
Algeria	0	0	0	7	2	0	0	9
Argentina	1	0	0	24	2	1	0	28
Armenia	0	10	1	2	0	0	0	13
(Australia) Australasia	0	0	0	1	0	0	0	1
Australia	0	0	3	7	2	2	0	14
Austria	7	1	1	0	8	0	1	18
Azerbaijan	0	8	20	10	7	4	2	51
Bahrain	0	0	1	0	0	0	0	1
Belarus	0	7	7	2	2	0	0	18
Belgium	10	0	3	4	14	1	0	32
Bermuda	0	0	0	1	0	0	0	1
Bohemia	2	0	0	0	0	0	0	2
Brazil	0	0	0	9	28	3	0	40
Bulgaria	0	33	40	20	3	1	1	98
Cameroon	0	0	0	2	0	0	0	2
Canada	1	0	17	18	8	3	0	47
(Cape Verde) Cape Verdi	0	0	0	1	0	0	0	1
Chile	0	1	0	3	0	0	0	4
China	15	8	12	19	23	13	2	92
Chinese Taipei	0	0	0	4	1	9	1	15
Colombia	0	0	3	5	2	1	0	11
Croatia	0	0	0	1	1	6	0	8
Cuba	10	19	13	80	37	7	0	166
Czech Republic	2	1	0	1	2	0	0	6
Czechoslovakia	0	11	4	6	1	0	0	22
Denmark	6	10	0	12	0	1	0	29
Dominican Republic	0	0	0	4	0	2	0	6
East Germany	1	4	3	13	9	0	0	30
Ecuador	0	0	1	0	0	0	0	1
Egypt	2	8	0	4	2	4	2	22
Estonia	2	8	3	1	3	0	0	17
Finland	0	58	25	16	0	0	0	99
France	130	9	9	28	67	10	1	254
Gabon	0	0	0	0	0	1	0	1
(Georgia (country)) Georgia	0	8	13	2	15	0	0	38
Germany	21	22	7	24	22	2	0	98
Ghana	0	0	0	4	0	0	0	4
(United Kingdom) Great Britain	9	0	17	63	20	10	0	119
Greece	5	9	3	0	3	4	0	24
Guyana	0	0	0	1	0	0	0	1
Hong Kong	3	0	0	0	0	0	1	4
Hungary	93	41	15	20	10	1	1	181
Iceland	0	0	0	0	1	0	0	1
India	0	0	8	3	0	0	0	11
Iran	0	13	42	0	0	10	1	66
(Republic of Ireland) Ireland	0	0	0	19	0	0	0	19
Israel	0	0	0	0	9	1	0	10
Italy	135	19	3	48	18	5	2	230
Ivory Coast	0	0	0	0	0	4	0	4
Japan	8	17	70	8	104	1	3	202
Jordan	0	0	0	0	0	3	1	4
Kazakhstan	0	6	12	26	6	1	2	53
Kenya	0	0	0	7	0	0	0	7
Kosovo	0	0	0	0	5	0	0	5
Kyrgyzstan	0	6	5	1	1	0	0	13
Latvia	0	1	0	0	1	0	0	2
Lebanon	0	3	0	0	0	0	0	3
Lithuania	0	2	0	1	0	0	0	3
Mauritius	0	0	0	1	0	0	0	1
Mexico	1	1	0	14	1	7	0	24
Moldova	0	1	1	2	2	0	0	6
Mongolia	0	0	10	7	12	0	0	29
Morocco	0	0	0	4	0	0	0	4
(Unified Team at the Olympics) Mixed team	1	0	0	0	0	0	0	1
Netherlands	5	0	0	8	24	0	0	37
New Zealand	0	0	0	4	0	0	0	4
Niger	0	0	0	1	0	1	0	2
Nigeria	0	0	1	6	0	1	0	8
North Korea	0	2	10	9	8	0	0	29
North Macedonia	0	0	1	0	0	1	0	2
Norway	1	5	4	5	0	2	0	17
Pakistan	0	0	1	1	0	0	0	2
Panama	0	0	0	1	0	0	0	1
Philippines	0	0	0	10	0	0	0	10
Poland	23	21	6	44	8	0	0	102
Portugal	1	0	0	0	4	0	0	5
Puerto Rico	0	0	2	6	0	0	0	8
(Taiwan) ROC	8	3	5	6	3	4	0	29
Romania	17	27	7	25	6	0	0	82
Russia	26	22	34	30	16	4	0	132
(Russia) Russian Empire	0	3	0	0	0	0	0	3
San Marino	0	0	1	0	0	0	0	1
Saudi Arabia	0	0	0	0	0	0	1	1
Serbia	0	2	0	0	0	5	1	8
Slovakia	0	0	1	0	1	0	0	2
Slovenia	0	0	0	0	7	0	0	7
South Africa	0	0	0	19	0	0	0	19
South Korea	19	16	20	21	51	25	0	152
Soviet Union	49	60	56	51	23	0	0	239
Spain	1	0	1	6	7	7	2	24
Sweden	7	58	28	11	1	0	0	105
Switzerland	8	1	14	0	4	0	0	27
Syria	0	0	1	1	0	0	0	2
Tajikistan	0	0	1	2	3	0	0	6
Thailand	0	0	0	16	0	7	0	23
Tonga	0	0	0	1	0	0	0	1
Tunisia	2	0	1	2	0	4	0	9
Turkey	0	25	43	10	2	10	4	94
Uganda	0	0	0	4	0	0	0	4
Ukraine	9	9	12	16	4	0	2	52
(Unified Team at the Olympics) Unified Team	5	9	7	2	4	0	0	27
(United Arab Emirates) UAE	0	0	0	0	1	0	0	1
United States	37	15	130	118	14	11	1	326
United Team of Germany	4	7	2	6	2	0	0	21
Uruguay	0	0	0	1	0	0	0	1
Uzbekistan	0	2	8	20	10	3	0	43
Venezuela	1	0	0	6	0	2	0	9
Vietnam	0	0	0	0	0	1	0	1
West Germany	16	5	4	6	8	0	0	39
(Socialist Federal Republic of Yugoslavia) Yugoslavia	0	12	4	11	2	0	0	29
Zambia	0	0	0	1	0	0	0	1
Totals	704	649	779	1048	667	208	32	4087

== 21st century: Global presence of mixed martial arts (MMA) and Brazilian jiu-jitsu ==
The 20th century saw the rise of cross-discipline contests, culminating with the creation of dedicated leagues for mixed martial arts, such as Shooto and the Ultimate Fighting Championship. However, it was not until early 21st century when mixed martial arts became known worldwide. By the early 2000s, Brazilian jiu-jitsu became a sport that is known worldwide.

== Reconstruction ==
The reconstruction of a martial art as practiced in a specific period is distinct from the practice of a traditional fighting system handed down by way of master-student transmission. The largest movement of martial arts reconstruction is the Historical European Martial Arts revival (HEMA), gaining momentum since the late 1990s. There were also separate efforts in Eastern Europe to reconstruct historical medieval melee tournament with the creation of armored combat sport, with the rules being unified in 2009, gaining international popularity. To a limited extent, there are also attempts to reconstruct other styles, such as Korean swordsmanship and Persian armed combat called razmafzar.

The Japanese term Koryū refers to "old schools" of martial arts which predate 1868; it does not imply that historical styles are actively reconstructed, just that the school's tradition goes back 150 years or more.

A reconstructed martial art necessarily rests on historical records, either combat manuals or pictorial representations. Martial arts reconstruction specifically does not claim an unbroken tradition of some historical martial arts. On the contrary, the premise is that in an unbroken tradition, styles significantly evolve over time. It is not necessary for the tradition to have been interrupted in order to reconstruct an earlier style; a case in point is classical fencing which reconstructs the sport fencing of the 19th century before it evolved into current Olympic fencing, or historical German ringen which over time developed into contemporary styles of folk wrestling. Claims of ancient martial arts which survive unchanged by unbroken tradition (e.g. as suggested by Yehoshua Sofer), do not fall under reconstruction and are by their nature unverifiable, even to the person making the claim.

Certain modern schools of Ninjutsu may fall under the category of martial arts reconstruction; the Bujinkan organization claims to base their teaching on a manuscript documenting a historical school, known as Togakure-ryū, dated to the 12th century. But as this manuscript is supposedly in the private possession of Masaaki Hatsumi, its authenticity, or indeed existence, cannot be verified by independent parties.

== See also ==
- Martial arts timeline
- History of sport
- History of archery
- History of warfare
- History of wrestling
- History of physical training and fitness

== Bibliography ==
- Michael B. Poliakoff, Combat Sports in the Ancient World: Competition, Violence, and Culture Sports and History Series, Yale University Press (1987).
- Thomas A. Green, Joseph R. Svinth (eds.), Martial Arts of the World: An Encyclopedia of History and Innovation, 2010, two volumes: vol. 1: 'Regions and Individual Arts', ISBN 9781598842449; vol. 2: 'Themes', ISBN 9781598842432.
