= Puthooramputhri Unniyarcha =

- Newspaper advertisement of the film
- Directed by: P. G. Viswambharan
- Screenplay by: Shatrughnan
- Produced by: K. Ramakrishnan
- Starring: Vani Viswanath; Kunchacko Boban; Devan; Siddique; Captain Raju
- Cinematography: Ramachandra Babu
- Edited by: L. Bhoominathan
- Music by: Songs: Usha Khanna; Background Score: Johnson
- Production company: Shyney Films
- Distributed by: Milsa International through Shyney Release
- Release date: 31 May 2002
- Country: India
- Language: Malayalam

Puthooramputhri Unniyarcha is a 2002 Indian Malayalam-language historical film directed by P. G. Viswambharan. Based on Vadakkanpattu, the folklore of North Malabar, which are ballads extolling the brave and valiant chekavars, it stars Vani Viswanath, Kunchacko Boban, Devan, Siddique and Captain Raju in major roles. Jagadeesh, Mala Aravindan, Jayakrishnan, Naveen Arakkal, Anoop, Sreehari, Manya, Manka Mahesh, Spadikam George and Mamukkoya form the supporting cast. This is the last film of P. G. Viswambharan.

The film's music is scored by veteran composer Usha Khanna with lyrics by poet Yusuf Ali Kechery. The film had some of the best technicians of India in its crew, such as the Director P.G. Viswambharan, composer Johnson, cinematographer Ramachandra Babu, editor Sreekar Prasad and art director Gangan Thalavil. The film turned out to be a box office bomb and was taken out of theatres in three days.

The film's production commenced in December 2000 and occurred mainly at Cheloormana in Chittur, Palakkad.

Captain Raju, Devan, Kundara Johny, and Bheeman Raghu also starred in the 1989 Malayalam blockbuster Oru Vadakkan Veeragatha, depicting the story from Chanthu's side.

== Plot ==
The film tells the story Unniyarcha, the valiant heroine of the Vadakkanpattu (Ballads of North Malabar or Songs of the North), though a member of the fairer sex, she masters martial arts and proves herself as an equal to her brother Aromal Chekavar and cousin Chanthu Chekavar, both renowned warriors. Unniyarcha is portrayed as the embodiment of all virtues. The film also narrates how jealousy takes its roots in the mind of Chanthu, and how he grows hostile to Aromal, consequently betraying him during a duel. Chanthu was always attracted to Unniyarcha, who always hated him for his cheating behavior. Unniyarcha marries Kunjiraman in spite of Chanthu's objection. Chanthu leaves Puthuram Tharavadu and goes to Tulunadu. Now Aromal has to fight with Aringodar, who is an experienced fighter. Aromal's father, Kannappan Chekavar, calls back Chanthu as second for Aromal for the fight even though it was objected to by Aromal and Unniyarcha. Aringodar encourages Chanthu to make a defective sword for Aromal. During the fight between Aromal and Aringodar, the sword of Aromal breaks into two pieces. Aromal requests Chanthu to give his sword, but Chanthu lies that he has not taken one. Then Aromal throws the broken sword piece at Aringodar, which cuts his head off. Now at Puthuram Tharavadu, everyone sees a fatally wounded Aromal comes out of the palanquin and tells that Chanthu had cheated by stabbing him while sleeping. Unniyarcha then pledges to take revenge for this betrayal; and till then, she never ties her hair. Now Unniyarcha trains his son Aromalunni, who grows to become a brave warrior, along with Aromal's son Kanappanunni. Now both the cousins are sent for a kalari. Here the local boys try to attack Aromalunni due to jealousy of his rich status. Aromalunni and Kanappanunni defeat everyone, but the elders ask them to show their skill by defeating Chanthu. Now Aromalunni asks his mother to reveal the killer of his uncle. Unniyarcha reveals everything. Kannappan Chekavar first refuses Aromalunni and Kanapanunni to go for revenge, fearing Chanthu is skilled in the eighteen techniques of kalari. He teaches them the 19th secret technique. Chanthu finally gets ready to fight with the sons of Puthuram Tharavadu. Finally, after a long fight, Aromalunni tells the 19th secret technique of the kalari he is going to fight. He lifts a dust cloud around Chanthu's head, finally chopping off the head of Chanthu. Aromalunni and Kanappanunni returns with the head of Chanthu on a platter and hands it over to Unniyarcha.

== Cast ==
- Vani Viswanath as Unniyarcha, Aromalunni's Mother
- Kunchacko Boban as Aaromalunni, Unniyarcha's son
- Devan as Chanthu Chekavar (voiceover by Jayan Cherthala)
- Siddique as Aromal Chekavar, Kannappanunni's father
- Captain Raju as Kannappan Chekavar, Unniyarcha's father and Aromalunni's grandfather
- Jayakrishnan as Kunjiraman, Unniyarcha's husband and Aromalunni's father
- Naveen Arakkal as Kannappanunni, Aromal chekavar's son
- Jomol as Kanni
- Spadikam George as Aringodar
- Jagadeesh
- Bheeman Raghu
- Mala Aravindan
- Kundara Johny
- Anoop
- Sreehari
- Manya
- Manka Mahesh
- Mamukkoya as Aliyar
- Mahima
- Kanya Bharathi as Kunjunnooli, Kannappanunni's mother

== Reception ==
A critic from Sify wrote that "In spite of the presence of stars like Vani Viswanath and teenage sensation Kunchacko Boban, the film fails to deliver". A critic from Cinesouth wrote that "director Viswambharan tells that story in a very dynamic, interesting manner using the same success formula that were applied to any picture of this type of 'Vadakkan Pattu'".
