= Lauvaux =

Lauvaux is a French surname. Notable people with the surname include:

- Gustave Lauvaux (1892–1970), French Olympic runner
- Henri Lauvaux (1900–1970), French Olympic runner, brother of Gustave

== See also ==
- Constant Lavaux (1877–1961), Belgian wrestler
