= Oru Vadakkan Veeragatha =

1989 Indian Malayalam film by Hariharan

- Promotional Poster
- Directed by: Hariharan
- Written by: M. T. Vasudevan Nair
- Produced by: P. V. Gangadharan
- Starring: Mammootty; Suresh Gopi; Balan K. Nair; Captain Raju; Maadhavi
- Cinematography: K. Ramachandra Babu
- Edited by: M. S. Mani
- Music by: Bombay Ravi
- Production company: Grihalakshmi Productions
- Distributed by: Kalpaka Films
- Release date: 14 April 1989
- Running time: 168 minutes
- Country: India
- Language: Malayalam
- Box office: ₹ 1.53 crores (re-release)

Oru Vadakkan Veeragatha (transl. A northern ballad of valour), credited internationally as A Northern Story of Valor, is a subplot of Vadakkan Pattukal, a medieval ballad from North Malabar and is often regarded as a classic in Malayalam cinema. The film won four National Film Awards including Best Actor (Mammootty), Best Screenplay (Nair), Best Production Design and Best Costume Design (P. Krishnamoorthy) and eight Kerala State Film Awards. The film tells the story in a different way, where the character of Chanthu is a good man in the movie, while the original ballad depicts him as a cheater. The film had a re-release in theaters on 7 February 2025.

== Plot ==
The film is set in 12th-century northern Kerala. The plot unfolds at Puthooram, the house of the great Kannappan Chekavar. The chekavar clan provide martial services to their lords by training and providing fighters to help settle feudal disputes through trial by combat. Kannappan Chekavar adopts the son of his estranged sister when the boy loses both his parents and brings him to Puthooram to live and learn with his cousins. The orphan boy, Chandu, a quick learner, earns the love and admiration of his uncle, while he is loathed by his cousin Aromal.

As they grow up, Chandu is betrothed to Chekavar's daughter, Unniyarcha. Chandu is constantly mocked and made to feel like an outsider by the jealous Aromal. He even ends his sister's budding romance with Chandu by marrying her off to his unmanly but better-off friend Kunjiraman. The lack of protest on Unniyarcha's part breaks Chandu's heart. He attempts to move on by proposing to Kunjinooli, another girl who professed her love for him. Aromal preempts his proposal by breaking off his own bethrotal and proposing to Kunjinooli himself. Disappointed, Chandu leaves to study Kalaripayattu under the tutelage of Tulunadan expert and master Chekavar, Aringodar.

On Aromal's wedding day, Unniyarcha invites Chandu to her room. When Kunjiraman unexpectedly arrives and finds them alone together, Unniyarcha convinces her husband that Chandu broke into her room by pretending to be him. A dejected Chandu, now with the reputation of being a womaniser, finds solace in Kunji, Aringodar's daughter.

Feudal lord Unnichandror arrives at the footsteps of Aringodar and asks him to represent his cause in an angam (duel unto death) against his brother Unnikonar. Unnikonar, in turn, asks Aromal to represent him. Chandu is caught in a dilemma when his uncle requests him to play the second hand to Aromal in the angam against his teacher Aringodar. Unniyarcha approaches Chandu and offers to live with him if he helps Aromal win. Chandu is tempted and decides to second Aromal. He takes on the task of revitalising Aromal's swords by giving them for treatment to a blacksmith. However, Kunji, Aringodar's daughter, bribes the blacksmith to make them brittle.

On the day of the duel, Aromal, though highly skilled, is no match for the master Aringodar. To add to the misery, Aromal's sword breaks in two. Chandu placates an attacking Aringodar, seeking time to replace the weapon and he obliges. Aromal takes advantage of the momentarily unguarded Aringodar and throws his broken sword at him, killing him.

As the victorious Aromal retires to his resting place, Chandu follows him to tend to his injuries. Aromal accuses Chandu of sabotage by treating the swords to make them brittle, and attacks him. In their scuffle, Aromal accidentally stabs himself by falling over a lamp. As people gather, the mortally wounded Aromal accuses Chandu of betraying him with his last breath.

The ill-fated Chandu escapes the mob and finds the blacksmith, who informs him about Kunji's bribe. Fighting his way through an entire contingent of guards, the furious Chandu storms into Aringodar's household seeking Kunji. To add to his list of regrets, he finds Kunji has committed suicide by hanging herself. Chandu returns to Puthooram and is greeted by a raging Unniyarcha, who vows that her unborn son will avenge her brother's death.

Years later, Aromal Unni and Kannapan Unni (sons of Unniyarcha and Aromal Chekavar, respectively) come to Arangodar's kalari seeking revenge. Chandu refuses to fight them. However, after being repeatedly challenged, Chandu easily beats them both, once again showing his mastery. Hoping that they will leave before bloodshed is inevitable, he attempts to retire his weapons. The two young warriors are in no mood to leave in defeat and insist on a duel to the death. Aromal Unni announces that he will either return with Chandu's head or die himself. Chandu realises the madness in the youngsters and appears to relent to their provocations, turning his back to them as if to pray in preparation for the duel. But knowing that no one will ever be able to win against him, and reminded that Aromal is Kannappan Chekavar's grandson, he commits one final act of valour: Chandu stabs himself with his sword. Reminiscing bitterly on what could have been, he addresses Aromal Unni as his unborn son and hopes that he will earn renown for being the one to defeat Chandu and avenge his uncle. He reaches out to the statue of his deity and dies. There ends the life of a valiant but misunderstood man, the greatest warrior of his age.

== Cast ==
- Mammootty as Chandu Chekavar
  - Vineeth Kumar as Child Chandu
  - Biyon as young Chandu
- Suresh Gopi as Aromal Chekavar
  - Dr.Roshan Bijli as young Aromal Chekavar
- Balan K. Nair as Kannappan Chekavar
- Captain Raju as Aringodar
- Maadhavi as Unniyarcha
  - Jomol as young Unniyarcha
- Geetha as Kunji
- Rajalakshmi as Kuttimani
- Ramu as Unnichandror
- Devan as Unnikonnar
- Oduvil Unnikrishnan as the King
- Chithra as Kunjinooli
  - Ambili as young Kunjinooli
- Soorya as the blacksmith's daughter
- Sanjay Mitra as Aromalunni
- Arya as Young Thumbola Archa
- Rasheed Ummer as Kanappanuni
- Sukumari as Kannappan Chekavar's wife
- V. K. Sreeraman as Kunjiraman
  - Vishal Menon as young Kunjiraman
- Sanoop Sajeendran as Thanku
- Kundara Johny as Aringodar's student
- Bheeman Raghu as Aringodar's student
- Tony as Unnikannan

== Soundtrack ==
The film's soundtrack contains 5 songs, composed by Bombay Ravi. Lyrics by Kaithapram and K. Jayakumar.

#	Title	Singer(s)
1	"Chandanalepa Sugandham" -by K.Jayakumar	K. J. Yesudas
2	"Enthinavidam"	K. J. Yesudas
3	"Indulekha Kanthurannu" -by Kaithapram	K. J. Yesudas
4	"Kalarivilakku Thelinjathaano" -by K.Jayakumar	K. S. Chitra
5	"Unni Ganapathi Thamburaane" -by Kaithapram	K. S. Chitra, Asha Latha

== Reception ==
=== Critical reception ===
The film received commercial and critical acclaim upon its release. In a retrospect review Neelima Menon of The News Minute states that, "While Mammootty aces Chandu, delivering the verbose dialogues with finesse and precision, and bringing a sense of drama in his body language, Maadhavi lives up to the picturisation of Unniyarcha—with her luminous eyes, grace and a bearing that's regal and confident, making it easier to forgive her character's treachery. Captain Raju as the formidable Aringoder, Suresh Gopi as the cocky Aromal and Balan K. Nair as the generous Kannappan Chekavar are all perfectly cast.

=== Box office ===
The film was a commercial success at the box office. The film ran more than 375 days at the theatres.

== Awards ==
National Film Awards

- Best Screenplay – M. T. Vasudevan Nair
- Best Actor – Mammootty (also for Mathilukal)
- Best Art Direction – P. Krishnamoorthy
- Best Costume Design – P. Krishnamoorthy

Kerala State Film Awards

- Best Popular Film
- Best Screen Play – M. T. Vasudevan Nair
- Best Actor – Mammootty
- Second Best Actress – Geetha
- Best Cinematography – K. Ramachandra Babu
- Best Female Play Back Singer – K. S. Chithra
- Best Child Artist - Vineeth Kumar
- Best Art Director - P. Krishnamoorthy

Kerala Film Critics Association Awards

- Second Best Film
- Best Actor – Mammootty
- Second Best Actor – Suresh Gopi
- Best Art Director – P. Krishnamoorthy
- Best Lyricist – K. Jayakumar
- Special Jury Award for Direction – Hariharan

Filmfare Awards South

- Filmfare Award for Best Film – Malayalam – P. V. Gangadharan

== Legacy ==
Oru Vadakkan Veeragatha is often regarded as one of the classics in Malayalam cinema. The Times of India included the film in its list of "10 Malayalam films to watch before you die" Sify.com included it in its list of "Ten Outstanding Performances From Mammootty."
