= Paul Pons =

French wrestler (1864 – 1915)

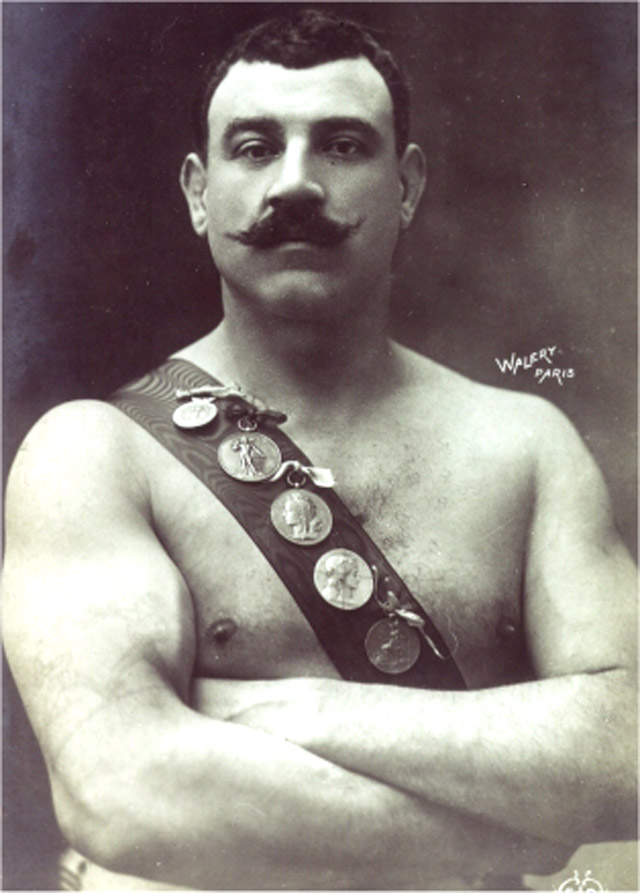

Paul Pons (June 23, 1864–April 13, 1915), stage name le Colosse ("The Colossus"), was a French wrestler. He won the first title as world champion in Greco-Roman wrestling in 1898 (as opposed to the first Olympic victory, won two years earlier by Carl Schuhmann).

Born in Sorgues, France he won the first world championship in wrestling, organized by Le Journal des Sports, by beating Polish competitor from Russian Empire, Wladislaus Pytlasinski. His fame allowed him to open a gym in Paris offering wrestling classes. His most famous student was Belgian wrestler, Constant Lavaux (stage name Constant le Boucher). The championship passed to Bulgarian Nikola Petroff in 1900, when he defeated Pons at the Exposition Universelle in Paris. Pons was considered one of the best wrestlers of all time during his lifetime. He published his memoirs in the sports magazine La Vie au grand air in 1907. He continued competing until 1909, when he, now aged 44, was defeated by Giovanni Raicevich in Milan.

Pons published a book on the history of wrestling in 1912.

He was included in the French gloires du sport (hall of fame of French sports) in 2003 and in Wrestling Observer Newsletter Hall of Fame in 2019.

== Championships and accomplishments ==
- International Professional Wrestling Hall of Fame
  - Class of 2021
- Wrestling Observer Newsletter
  - Wrestling Observer Newsletter Hall of Fame (Class of 2019)
