= History of wrestling =

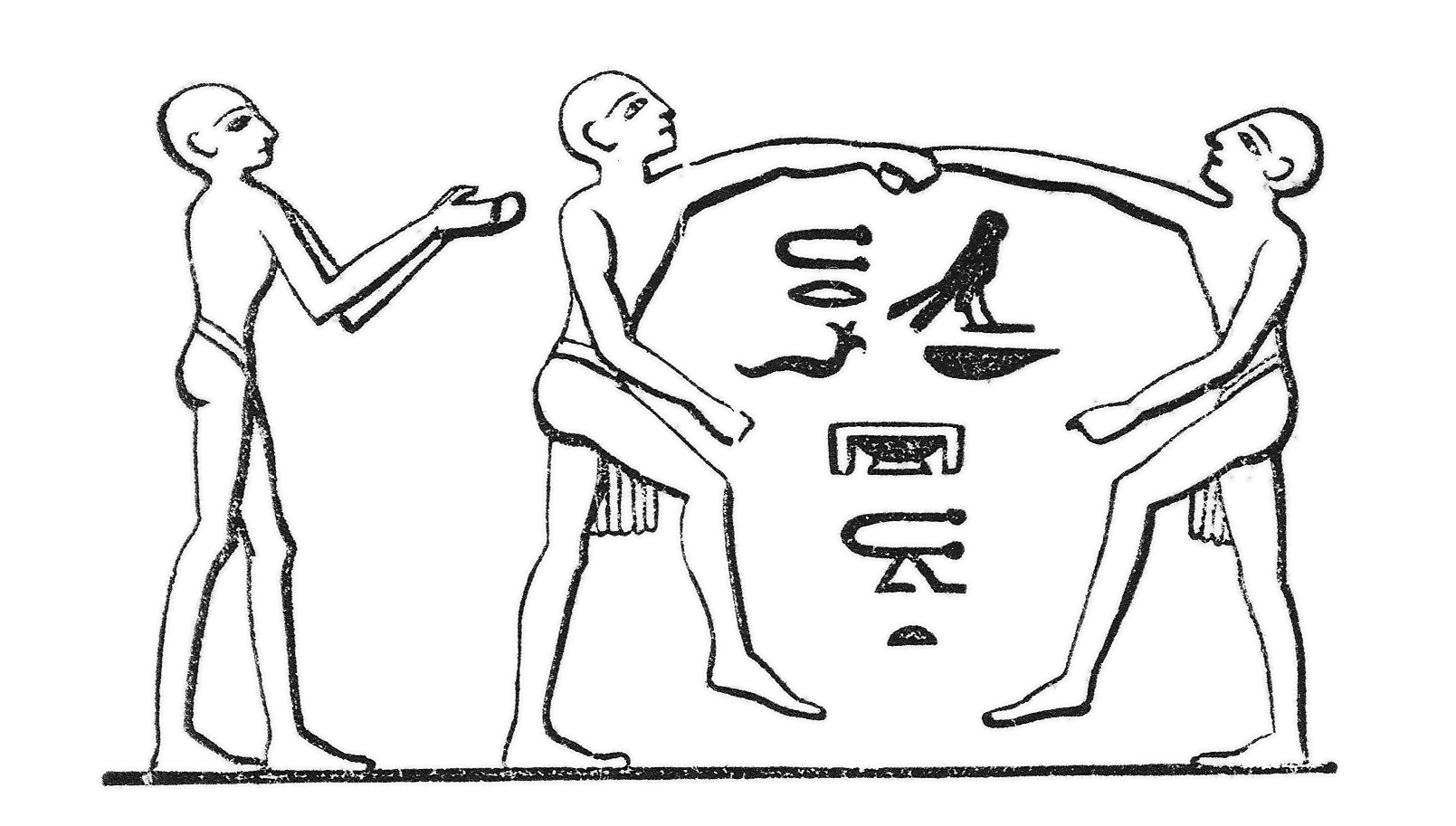
Ancient Egyptian wrestling.

Wrestling and grappling sports have a long and complicated history, stretching into prehistoric times. Many traditional forms survive, grouped under the term folk wrestling. More formal systems have been codified in various forms of martial arts worldwide, where grappling techniques form a significant subset of unarmed fighting (complemented by striking techniques).

The modern history of wrestling begins with a rise of popularity in the 19th century, which led to the development of the modern sports of Greco-Roman wrestling on the European continent and of freestyle wrestling and collegiate wrestling in Great Britain and the United States, respectively. These sports enjoyed enormous popularity at the turning of the 20th century. In the 1920s, professional wrestling once a competitive sport became a spectacle after promoters took control of the industry divorcing it from competitive sport wrestling, now known as amateur wrestling.

== Antiquity ==
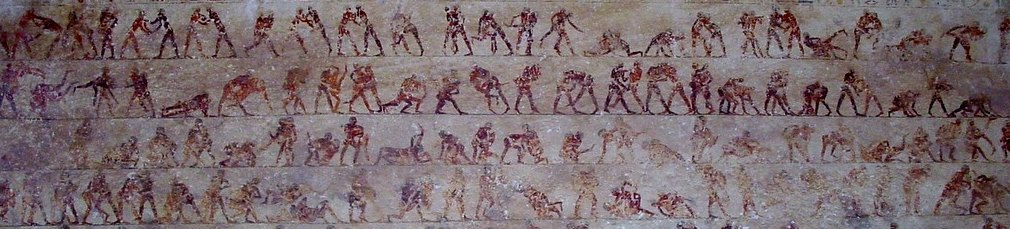
Detail of the wrestling scenes in tomb 15 (Baqet III) at Beni Hasan.

Wrestling is the oldest combat sport. While its foundational origins lie in global prehistory, many different forms of wrestling developed independently in different cultures at various periods in human history. It also played a role as a type of mock combat and display behaviour among males, which has anthropological roots, and is also seen in non-human Great Apes. Its documented history however necessarily begins with the history of pictorial representations. The oldest representations of wrestling date back 15,000–20,000 years ago, found in southern France. Cave paintings in the Bayankhongor Province of Mongolia dating back to Neolithic age of 7000 BC show grappling of two naked men and surrounded by crowds. In the Ancient Mesopotamia, forms of belt wrestling were popular from earliest times. A carving on a stone slabe showing three pairs of wrestlers was dated to around 3000 BC. A cast Bronze figurine, (perhaps the base of a vase) has been found at Khafaji in Iraq that shows two figures in a wrestling hold that dates to around 2600 BC. The statue is one of the earliest depictions of sport and is housed in the National Museum of Iraq.

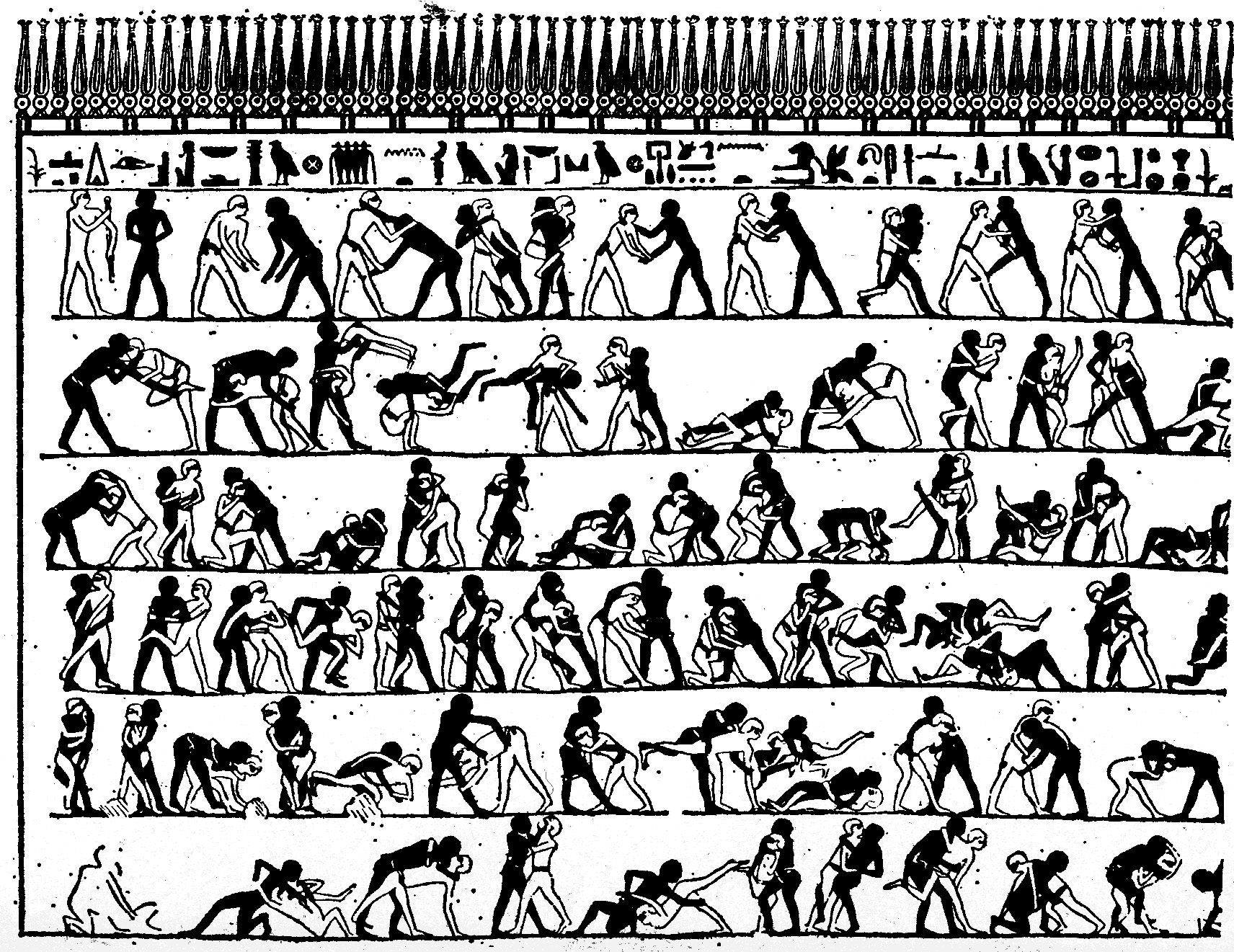
An Egyptian burial chamber mural, from the tomb of Baqet III dating to around 2000 BC, showing wrestlers in action, and subsequently showcasing a highly developed ancient martial art, containing some distinct manoeuvres which could be described in terms of the present-day Judo throwing techniques, freestyle single and double leg takedowns, Sambo and BJJ par terre techniques.

Portrayal of martial arts sporting in Egypt has begun by the time of the 5th Dynasty mastaba tombs at Saqqara, circa 2400 BC. After a boat joust scene recorded in the tomb of Niankhkhnum and Khnumhotep, who were manicurists to King Nyuserre, six pairs of boys wrestle in the nearby tomb of Akhethotep and Ptahhotep. (Note: The vizier Ptahhotep under King Isesi is buried in the complex of mastabas where the boys' games scenes occur. Davies (1900), p. 2, identifies Ptahhotep and Akhethotep as father and son, but does not say whether they are relatives of the vizier. Antiquity associated Vizier Ptahhotep's name with the Instruction of Ptahhotep, a document containing etiquette advice and philosophical reflections. However, this is first attested in Papyrus Prisse of the Middle Kingdom and Vincent Tobin assigns original composition to between latter Dynasty 6 and Dynasty 12, making it postdate Isesi by 100 to 400 years. See Tobin, "The Maxims of Phahhotep," in William Kelly Simpson (2003), The Literature of Ancient Egypt, Yale University Press, pp. 129-130. ISBN 978-0-300-09920-1) Another early piece of evidence for wrestling in Egypt appears at 11th and 12th Dynasty Beni Hasan (2000 BC, images at right and above), where wrestling scenes in several tombs are elaborated to cover much of a wall. During the period of the New Kingdom (1550-1070 BC), additional Egyptian artwork (often on friezes), depicted Egyptian and Nubian wrestlers competing. Carroll notes striking similarities between these ancient depictions and those of the modern Nuba wrestlers. On the 406 wrestling pairs found in the Middle Kingdom tombs at Beni Hasan in the Nile valley, nearly all of the techniques seen in modern freestyle wrestling could be found.

Textual description of wrestling begins with the ancient classics, especially the Greek and Sanskrit epics. The Mahabharata describes the encounter between the accomplished wrestlers Bhima and Jarasandha.

Shuai Jiao is a legendary wrestling style of Chinese antiquity used by the Yellow Emperor during his fight against the rebel Chi You at the Battle of Zhoulu. This early style of combat was first called jiao di (butting with horns).

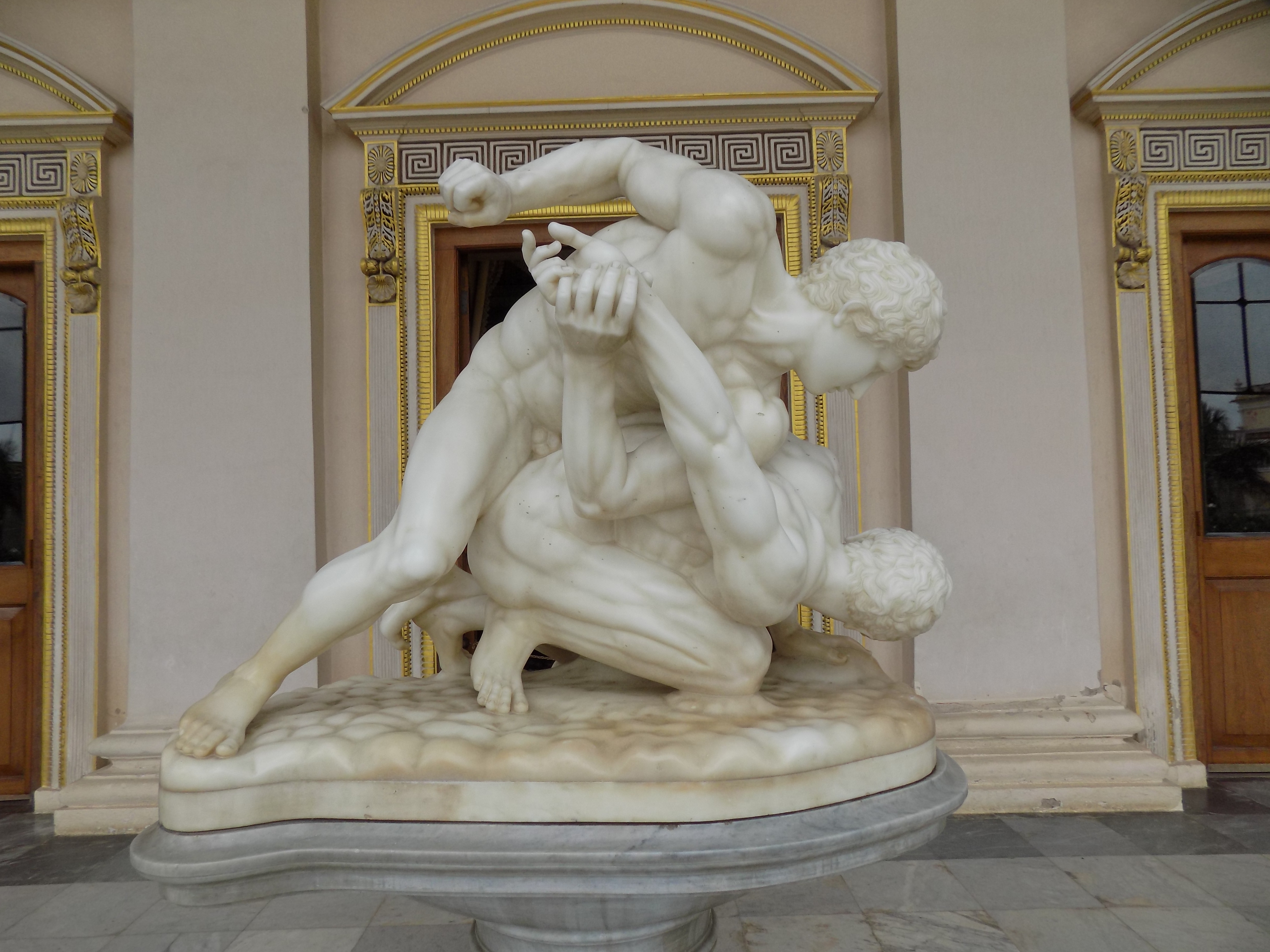
Ancient Greek/Roman wrestling statue The Wrestlers.

Greek wrestling was a popular form of martial art in which points were awarded for touching a competitor's back to the ground, forcing a competitor out of bounds (arena). Three falls determined the winner. It was at least featured as a sport since the eighteenth Olympiad in 704 BC. Wrestling is described in the earliest celebrated works of Greek literature, the Iliad and the Odyssey. Wrestlers were also depicted in action on many vases, sculptures, and coins, as well as in other literature. Other cultures featured wrestling at royal or religious celebrations, but the ancient Greeks structured their style of wrestling as part of a tournament where a single winner emerged from a pool of competitors. Late Greek tradition also stated that Plato was known for wrestling in the Isthmian games.

This continued into the Hellenistic period. Ptolemy II and Ptolemy III of Egypt were both depicted in art as victorious wrestlers. After the Roman conquest of the Greeks, Greek wrestling was adopted by the Roman culture and became Roman Wrestling during the period of the Roman Empire (510 BC to AD 500). By the eighth century, the Byzantine emperor Basil I, according to court historians, won in wrestling against a boastful wrestler from Bulgaria.

Celtic wrestling has an extensive history, with wrestling being mentioned in the Tailteann Games dating back from somewhere between 1839 BC to 632 BC (academics disagree) to the 12th century AD when the Normans invaded. Various styles such as Cornish wrestling, Gouren, Collar-and-elbow wrestling, etc. are likely to have evolved from some common style.

== Medieval and Early Modern Europe ==
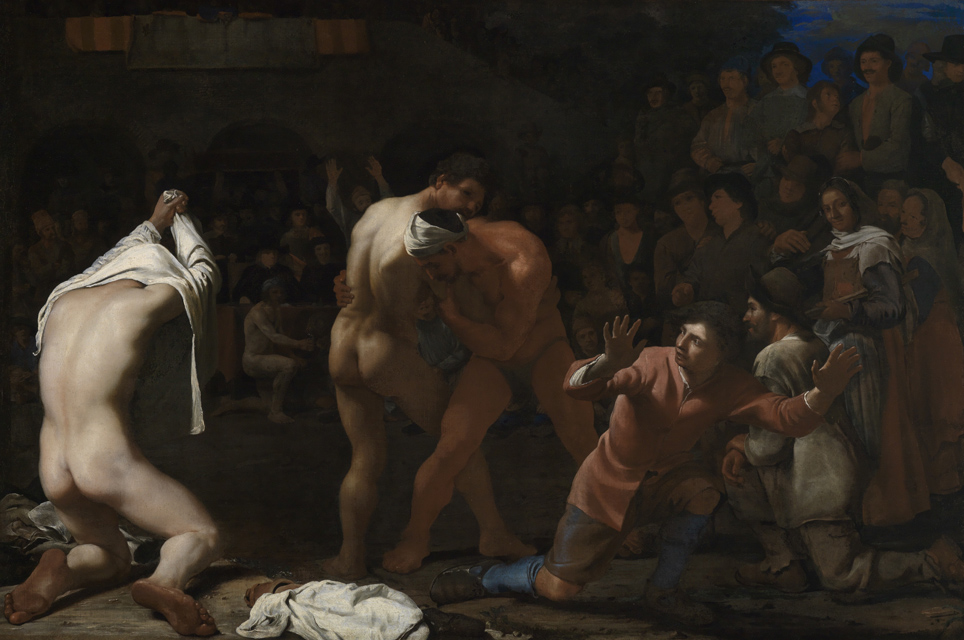
Michiel Sweerts, Wrestling Match, 1649.

There is ample evidence of wrestling practiced throughout medieval Europe, both by the nobility and the lower classes. Wrestling remained popular during the Renaissance, and for much of the 16th century. In 1520 at the Field of the Cloth of Gold pageant, Francis I of France threw Henry VIII of England in a wrestling shoes match (possibly with a Flying Mare), after his Cornish wrestlers had soundly defeated Francis' Breton wrestlers. In Henry VIII's kingdom, wrestling in many places was widely popular and had a long history.

The German tradition has records of a number of master-Ringer of the 15th to 16th centuries specializing in unarmed combat. Unarmed combat was divided in two categories, sportive grappling or geselliges ringen and serious unarmed combat or kampfringen (where kampf is the Early Modern German term for "duel"). While sportive grappling had fixed rules that prohibited dangerous techniques, usually starting in grappling hold and ending with a throw or submission, kampfringen can be considered a system of unarmed self-defense including punches, joint-locks, elbow strikes, chokeholds, headbutts and (to a limited extent) kicks.

One of the primary men to have shaped kampfringen at the dawning of the German Renaissance appears to have been Austrian master Ott Jud. He is said to have developed a system of grappling to be used in combat, including joint breaks, arm locks and throws designed to cause serious injury. No treatise from Ott's own hand has survived, but his system is taught by several fencing masters of the later 15th century. Paulus Kal counts him among the "society of Liechtenauer", saying that he was wrestling teacher to the "lords of Austria". (possibly under Frederick III). Other treatises that contain material both on ringen and on swordsmanship include those of Fiore dei Liberi (c. 1410), Fabian von Auerswald (1462), Pietro Monte (c. 1480), and Hans Wurm (c. 1500).

It was only with the beginning Early Modern period, specifically the more "dignified" code of behaviour the upper classes imposed on themselves in the Baroque period that wrestling was abandoned by European nobility, and it became a pastime of rural populations, developing into the various surviving forms of European folk wrestling. A late treatise on ringen is that by Johann Georg Passchen, published in 1659. Maybe the last book which deals with Ringen as a deadly martial art, is possibly "Leib-beschirmende und Feinden Trotz-bietende Fecht-Kunst" from Johann Andreas Schmidt, which was published in Weigel, Nürnberg in 1713.

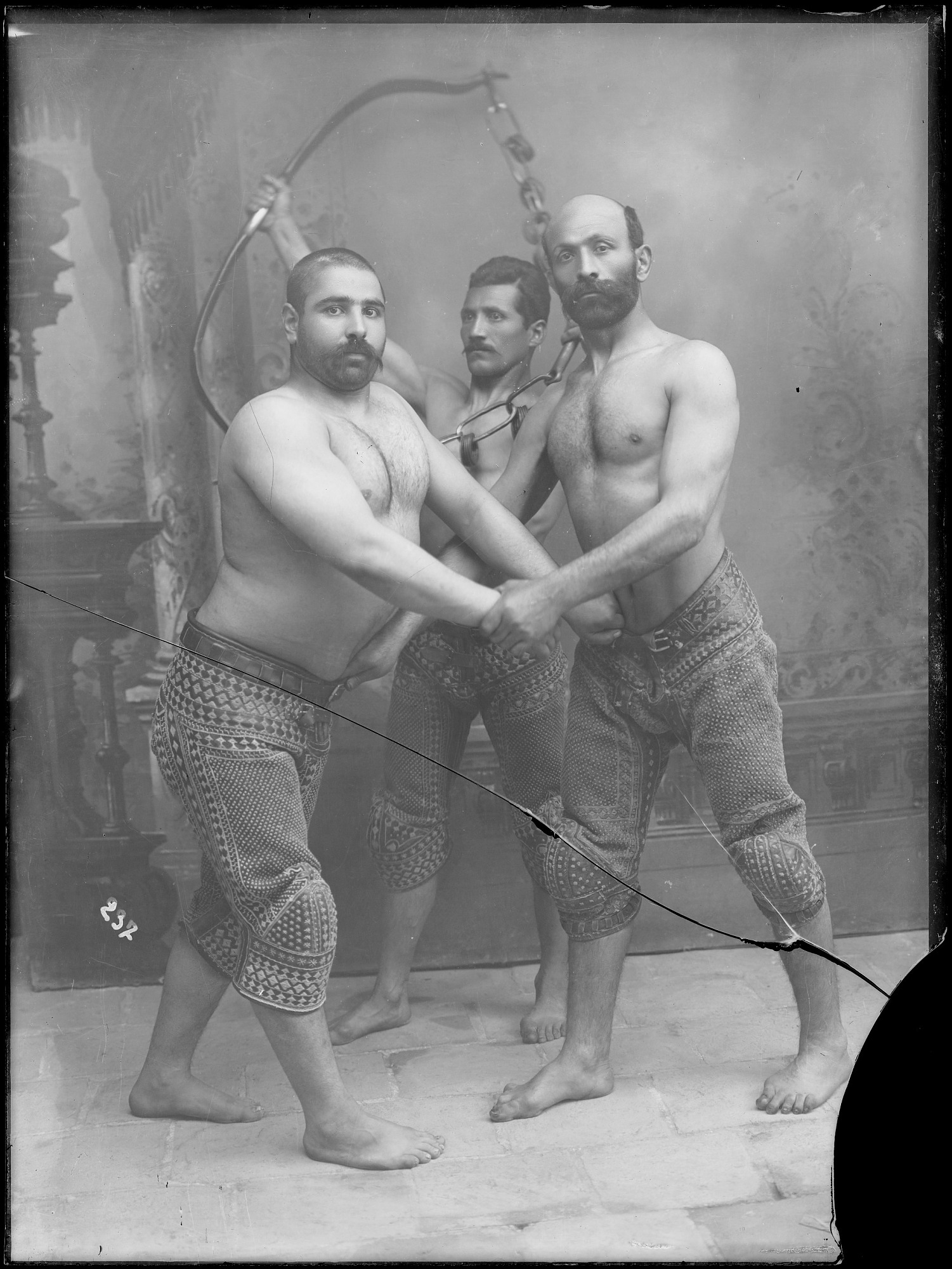
Studio Portrait of Three Persian Wrestlers by Antoin Sevruguin, c. 1890.

== In the Middle East ==
Many of the world's oldest depictions of wrestling can be found in the Middle East. Carvings and statues show that forms of belt wrestling existed in the region since ancient times, in addition to matches between humans and animals. Wrestling is also mentioned in the epics of Gilgamesh and the Shahnameh. Oil wrestling as practiced in present-day Turkey and Central Asia is recorded in ancient Sumeria and Babylon. In Persia, Pahlavani traditional grappling or koshti (کشتی) was practiced by both the upper and lower classes both for sport and as training for battle. In training halls known as zourkhaneh, soldiers practiced resistance exercises and grappling in a tradition now called Varzesh-e bastani (ورزش باستانی; lit. "ancient athletics"). Ancient Iranian combat-wrestling (koshti-ye jangi) included not only grabs but also punches and low kicks. As Iranian influence spread with the Achaemenid Empire and later the Persian Empire, the practice was adopted in the Indian subcontinent as Pehlwani.

== In Asia ==
=== China ===
In Ancient China, there were stories describing Chi You, the progenitor of jiao di(角抵), using punches and elbow strikes to the head and kicks to his opponents in wrestling tournaments. Classical Chinese wrestling or jiao li (角力) was a public sport in the Qin dynasty (221–207 BC) held for court amusement as well as for recruiting the best fighters. Competitors wrestled each other on a raised platform called a lei tai, and both competitors would have to either push their opponent off the platform, or submit them with various arm-locks(chin-na) to emerge as the winner. Traditionally, belts were also worn by wrestlers to have additional gripping. The term shuai jiao was chosen by the Central Guoshu Academy of Nanjing in 1928 when competition rules began to be standardized.

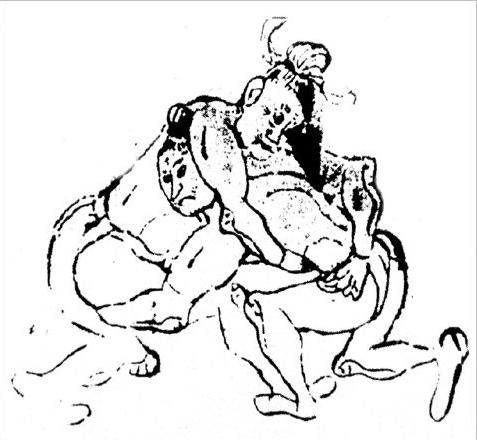
Two wrestlers, drawing of a detail of a Dunhuang fresco, ca. 7th century.

=== Indian subcontinent ===
Wrestling in the Indian subcontinent was differentiated into four types that progressed from sport (malakride) to combat (malla-yuddha) mentioned in Mahabharat 3050 BC. Mughal conquerors introduced more groundwork and referred to their grappling style as kusti. Competitors still wrestle as in ancient times, on dirt floors while wearing only kowpeenam or loincloth. Wresting was also described in Ramayana, which predates Mahabarata. The examples of the biggest wrestlers from Ramayana are Hanuman, Bali, Raavan (who was defeated by Bali), Sugreev and Angad. Hanuman is considered as an inspiration even in the current times as the biggest wrestler of all time and is also worshipped by the Indian wrestlers.

=== Japan ===
The term jūjutsu was coined in the 17th century, after which time it became a blanket term for a wide variety of grappling-related disciplines in Japanese martial arts. Prior to that time, these skills had names such as "short sword grappling" (小具足腰之廻, kogusoku koshi no mawari), "grappling" (組討 or 組打, kumiuchi), "body art" (体術, taijutsu), "softness" (柔 or 和, yawara), "art of harmony" (和術, wajutsu, yawarajutsu), "catching hand" (捕手, torite), and even the "way of softness" (柔道, jūdō) (as early as 1724, almost two centuries before Kanō Jigorō founded the modern art of Kodokan Judo). The systems of unarmed combat that were developed and practiced during the Muromachi period (before 1573) are today referred to collectively as Japanese old-style jujutsu (日本古流柔術, Nihon koryū jūjutsu).

== Modern history ==
=== Development of modern wrestling ===
The Lancashire style of folk wrestling may have formed the basis for Catch wrestling also known as "catch as catch can." The Scots later formed a variant of this style, Scottish Backhold, which would later remove all groundwork and focus solely on the takedown, and the Irish developed the "collar-and-elbow" style which later found its way into the United States.

Wrestling as a modern sport developed in the 19th century out of traditions of folk wrestling, emerging in the form of two styles of regulated competitive sport, "freestyle" and "Greco-Roman" wrestling (based on British and continental tradition, respectively), now summarized under the term "amateur wrestling" by the beginning of the modern Olympics.

A tradition of combining wrestling and showmanship originates in 1830s France, when showmen presented wrestlers under names such as "Edward, the steel eater", "Gustave d'Avignon, the bone wrecker", or "Bonnet, the ox of the low Alps" and challenged members of the public to knock them down for 500 francs. In 1848, French showman, Jean Exbroyat formed the first modern wrestlers' circus troupe and established a rule not to execute holds below the waist — a style he named "flat hand wrestling". This new style soon spread to the rest of Europe, the Austro-Hungarian Empire, Italy, Denmark and Russia under the names of Greco-Roman wrestling, Classic wrestling or French wrestling.

=== Golden Age (1890–1914) ===
By the end of the 19th century, this modern "Greco-Roman" wrestling style went on to become the most popular event in fashionable sport in Europe. Because of that and the rise of gymnasiums and athletic clubs, Greco-Roman wrestling and modern freestyle wrestling were soon regulated in formal competitions. On continental Europe, prize money was offered in large sums to the winners of Greco-Roman tournaments, and freestyle wrestling spread rapidly in the United Kingdom and in the United States.

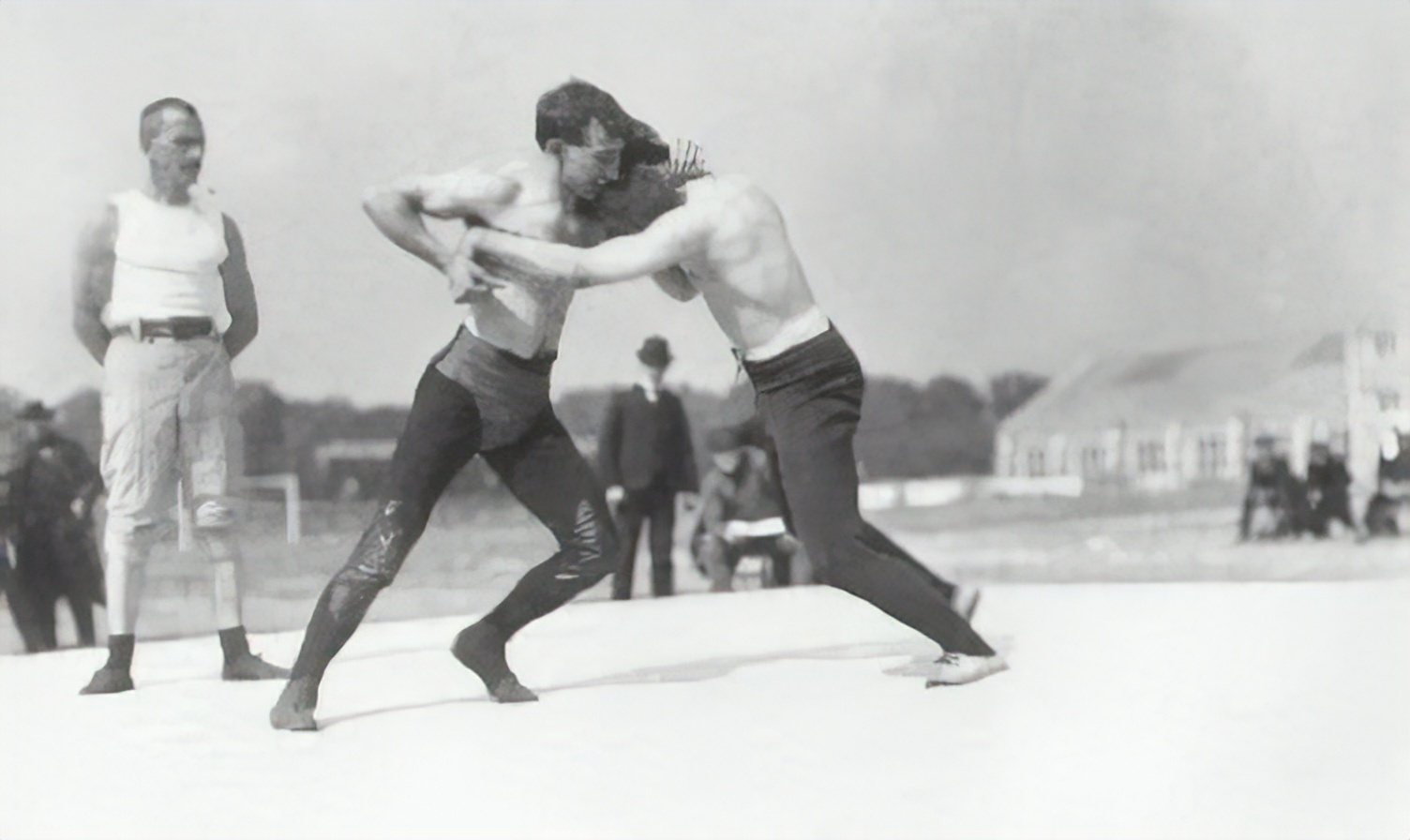
Wrestling at the 1904 Summer Olympics.

A "Golden Age" for the sport followed, cut short with the breakout of World War I in 1914. In 1898 the Frenchman Paul Pons, "the Colossus" became the first Professional World Champion. Leading wrestlers during this time, such as Georg Hackenschmidt, Stanislaus Zbyszko, William Muldoon, Frank Gotch, Constant Lavaux, had the status of popular heroes.

In the United States, wrestling was dominated by Martin "Farmer" Burns and his pupil, Frank Gotch. Burns was renowned as a competitive wrestler, who, despite never weighing more than 160 pounds during his wrestling career, fought over 6,000 wrestlers (at a time when most were competitive contests) and lost fewer than 10 of them. He also gained a reputation for training some of the best wrestlers of the era, including Gotch, known as one of America's first sports superstars. Gotch, regarded as "peerless" at his peak, was the first to actually claim the world's undisputed heavyweight championship by beating all contenders in North America and Europe. He became the world's champion by beating European wrestling champion Georg Hackenschmidt, both in 1908 and 1911, seen by modern wrestling historians as two of the most significant matches in wrestling history.

Professional wrestlers during this time would participate both in sportive competition and in shows focusing more on spectacle and entertainment, as wrestling was introduced to the public as part of a variety act to spice up the limited action involved in the bodybuilder strongman attractions. One of its earliest stars was a Cornish-American ex-miner named Jack Carkeek, who would challenge audience members to last 10 minutes with him. It is in this period that the origin between the later division between "professional wrestling" (non-competitive acrobatics and showmanship) and "amateur wrestling" (competitive) originates. Georg Hackenschmidt, world champion after his 1905 win over Tom Jenkins, associated himself with British promoter and entrepreneur Charles B. Cochran. Hackenschmidt took a series of bookings in Manchester for a then-impressive £150 a week. Noting Hackenschmidt's dominant style of wrestling threatened to kill crowd interest, Cochran persuaded Hackenschmidt to learn showmanship from Cannon and wrestle many of his matches for entertainment rather than sport; this displayed the future elements of sports entertainment.

The separation of "worked", i.e. purely performative, choreographed wrestling from competitive sport begins in the 1920s. The success of the more worked aspects of professional wrestling in America, like gimmickry and submission holds, were introduced to British wrestling. Amateur wrestler, Sir Atholl Oakeley got together with fellow grappler Henry Irslinger to launch one of the first promotions to employ the new style of wrestling which was coined "All-in wrestling". The great demand for wrestling meant there were not enough skilled amateurs to go around, and many promoters switched to more violent styles, with weapons and chairshots part of the proceedings. Women wrestlers and mud-filled rings also became commonplace. In the late 1930s, the London County Council banned professional wrestling.

When the First Modern Olympic Games held in Athens in 1896, Greco-Roman wrestling was introduced as an Olympic discipline. After not being featured in the 1900 Olympics, sports wrestling was seen again in 1904 in St. Louis; this time in freestyle competition. Since then, Greco-Roman and freestyle wrestling have both been featured (with women's freestyle added in the Summer Olympics of 2004).

=== Interwar period and later 20th century ===
The popularity of wrestling experienced a dramatic decline in 1915 to 1920, north due to the World War, and as its reputation had suffered especially among the American public because of widespread doubt of its legitimacy and status as a competitive sport.

Following the retirement of Frank Gotch, professional wrestling in the United States (except in the Midwest) was losing popularity fast. In response, three professional wrestlers, Ed Lewis, Billy Sandow, and Toots Mondt, joined to form their own promotion in the 1920s, modifying their in-ring product to attract fans. The three were referred to as the "Gold Dust Trio" due to their financial success. This marks the beginning of "professional wrestling" as an entertainment industry separate from competitive wrestling, and to a revival of public interest in wrestling in the interwar period. Wrestling did not, however, rise to its pre-war level of popularity again, being eclipsed by Boxing, which sport now experienced its own Golden Age.

Since 1921, the International Federation of Associated Wrestling Styles (FILA) has regulated amateur wrestling as an athletic discipline. In 1928, the NCAA published the rules for collegiate wrestling. That season, the first NCAA Wrestling Team Championship took place on March 30 to March 31 on the campus of Iowa State College. The rules of collegiate wrestling marked a sharp contrast to the freestyle wrestling rules of the International Amateur Wrestling Federation (IAWF) and the AAU. From then on, collegiate wrestling emerged as a distinctly American sport. College and high school wrestling grew especially after the standardization of the NCAA wrestling rules, which applied early on to both collegiate and scholastic wrestling (with high school modifications). More colleges, universities, and junior colleges began offering dual meets and tournaments, including championships and having organized wrestling seasons. There were breaks in wrestling seasons because of World War II, but in the high schools especially, state association wrestling championships sprung up in different regions throughout the 1930s and 1940s. As amateur wrestling grew after World War II, various collegiate athletic conferences also increased the number and quality of their wrestling competition, with more wrestlers making the progression of wrestling in high school, being recruited by college coaches, and then entering the collegiate competition.

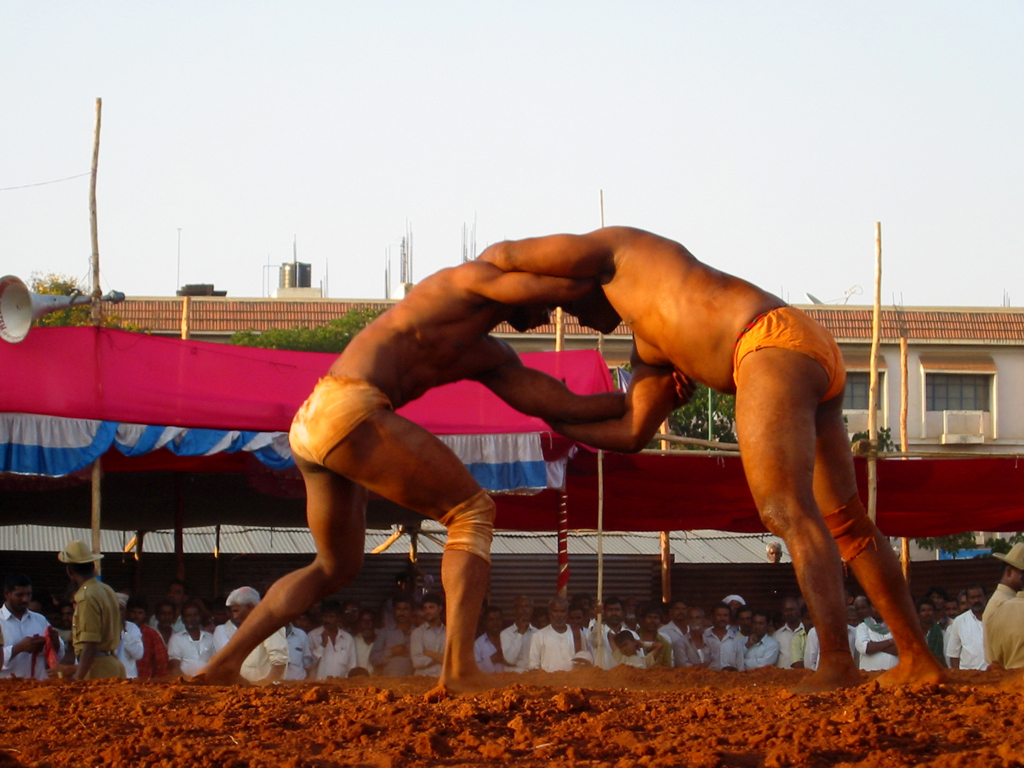
Pehlwani-style wrestling match in Davangere, Karnataka, India (2005).

Both freestyle wrestling and its American counterpart, collegiate wrestling, did not have a scoring system that decided matches in the absence of a fall until the introduction of a point system by the NCAA in the 1940-1941 season. This influenced the international styles as well. By the 1960s international wrestling matches in Greco-Roman and freestyle were scored by a panel of three judges in secret, who made the final decision by raising colored paddles at the match's end. In the late 1950's Dr. Albert deFerrari from San Francisco who became vice president of FILA, lobbied for a visible scoring system and a rule for "controlled fall", which would recognize a fall only when the offensive wrestler had done something to cause it. These were soon adopted internationally in Greco-Roman and freestyle.

== See also ==
- History of martial arts
- folk wrestling
