= Chandu Chekavar =

Kerala folk hero

Chandu Chekavar (Chathiyan Chanthu, also known as Chandu Panicker), was a sixteenth-century chekavar of the Chekavar family from Kerala folklore, mentioned in the folk songs of Northern Kerala called Vadakkan Pattukal.

== Biography ==
Chandu grew up alongside his cousins Unniyarcha and Aromal Chevakar in the Puthooram family's house in northern Kerala. While there he learnt Kalaripayattu under the tutelage of many experts, most notably his uncle, Kannappa Chekavar. Chandu, Aromal and Unniyarcha slowly became the greatest Kalaripayattu practitioners of their time. In his youth, Chandu acted as a fake bridegroom to Unniyarcha in a mock marriage ceremony, called a Kettu Kalyanam. Chandu mistook the ceremony for a wedding and believed that he and Unniyarcha would be wed. This however did not come to pass, as Aromal and Unniyarcha both opposed the coupling. Instead, Unniyarcha was married to a Puthussery Kalaripayttu practitioner, Kunjiraman. From then on, Chandu resented Aromal for opposing his marriage to Unniyarcha.

Chandu was offered the chance to enact his revenge when he was commanded by the Puthooram family to support Aromal in an upcoming duel against a Kalaripayattu fighter named Aringotar. Chandu was responsible for providing Aromal with the weapons he would use during the duel. He conspired with Aringotar to create a faulty sword for Aromal to use during the duel, which they presumed would allow for Aringotar to win. Despite having a faulty sword, Aromal was able to slay Aringotar but sustained minor wounds. Not aware of Chandu's resentment, he began resting on Chandu's lap to recover from his wounds. Seizing the opportunity to enact revenge, Chandu then stabbed into Aromal's wounds with a vilakku.

Aromal on his deathbed revealed Chandu's betrayal to the Puthooram family and then died from the wounds inflicted on him by Chandu. Henceforth Chandu was referred to as Chathiyan Chanthu, in English "Chandu the disloyal". Chandu later married the daughter of Aringotar and inherited Aringotar's estate.

Many years later Unniyarcha's son Aromalunni Chekavar, beheaded Chandu in an ankam to avenge his uncle, Aromal's murder.

== Popular culture ==
- In Oru Vadakkan Veeragatha, a Malayalam film released in 1989, Chandu is portrayed by Mammootty, which won him the National Award for Best Actor.
- Devan played Chathiyan Chandhu Chekkavar in 2002 Malayalam film Puthooramputhri Unniyarcha.
- Kunal Kapoor portrayed Chandu in the 2016 Malayalam film Veeram.

== See also ==
- Kalarippayattu
