= Giovanni Raicevich =

Italian Greco-Roman and professional wrestler

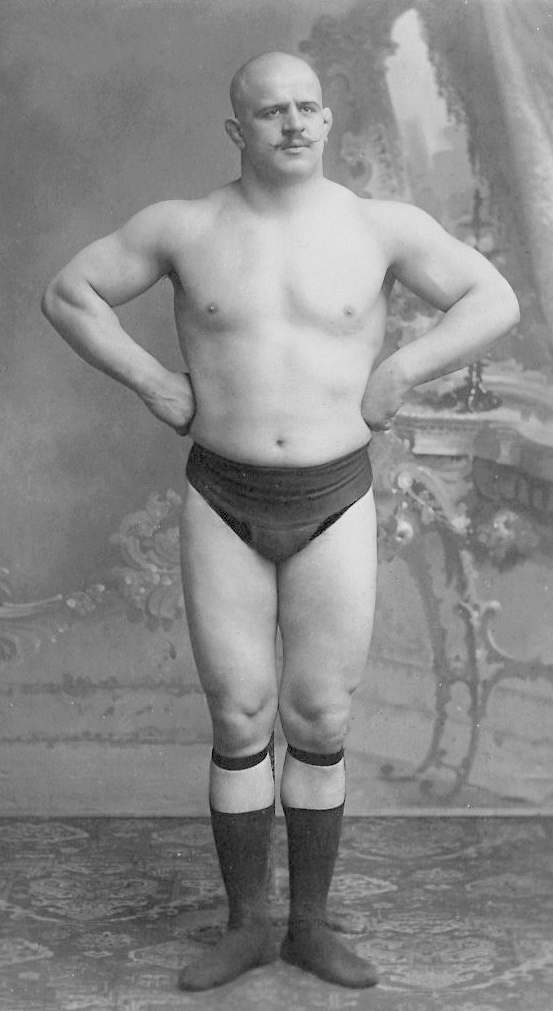

Personal information
- Born: 10 June 1881 Trieste, Austria-Hungary (now Italy)
- Died: 1 November 1957 (aged 76) Rome, Italy

Professional wrestling career
- Billed height: 172 cm (5 ft 8 in)
- Billed weight: 110 kg (240 lb)
- Debut: 1902
- Retired: 1929
Medal record
Representing the Italy
Greco-Roman wrestling
European
Gold medal – first place	1905 Liège
World Championship
Gold medal – first place	1907 Paris
Gold medal – first place	1909 Milan

Giovanni Raicevich (10 June 1881 – 1 November 1957) was an Italian amateur and professional wrestler and actor.

== Career ==
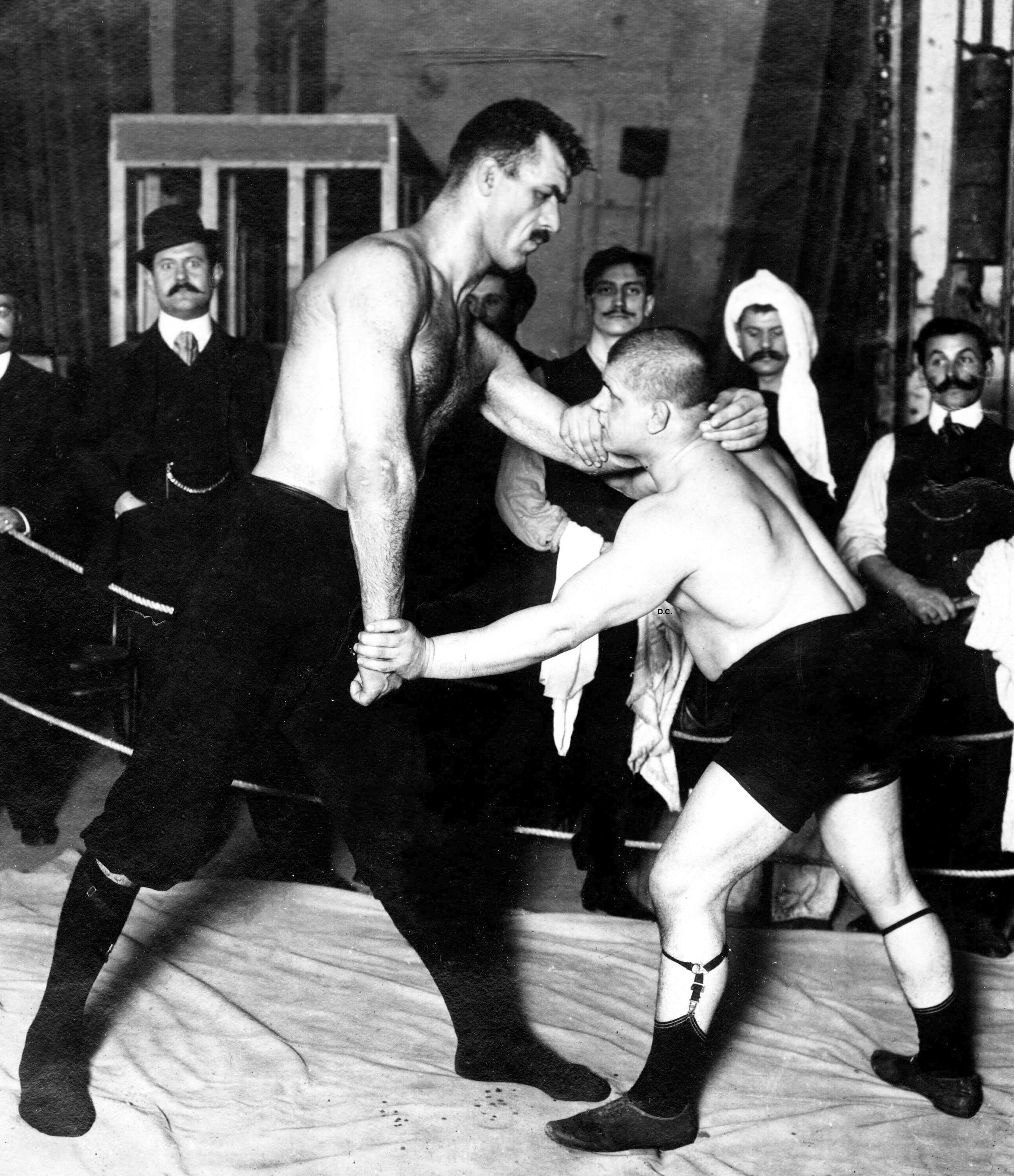
Raicevich (right) against Simon Antonić (height ca. 210 cm) in 1905

He belonged to a family of champions of Greco-Roman wrestling, who were famous, but low-key; his brothers were Roberto Massimo and Emilio Ruggerio Raicevich. Giovanni Raicevich, began his activities by opening a gym in Trieste, aided by his brothers. In 1902 they traveled to Alexandria where all three became Italian champions in three different categories. Although they were from Austro Hungary they pursued their careers in Italy. After the First World War Trieste became part of Italy.

In 1905 he won the International Tournaments of Liège, of Krefeld and Westphalia in addition to the European Championship. In 1906 he won the South America championship. In 1907 he became world champion by beating the French champion Laurent le Beaucairois. He repeated the success on 16 February 1909 at the Teatro Dal Verme in Milan, against the French Paul Pons, one of the best wrestlers of all time. He was also champion of Italy in the specialty without interruption from 1907 to 1929 when he left the unbeaten competitive sport after his triumph against the Czech Hans Kavan.

Despite his height of only 1.72 meters (with a weight ranging from 82 kg in 1902 to 110 kg in the 1912), he fought against people who were of higher stature and was always the winner. His physical strength won him parts cinema chromatography in several films in the series Maciste, including L'uomo della foresta of 1922 directed by Roman director Ubaldo Maria Del Colle.

In 1915 during the First World War, he served in the Army and fought on the Italian side at Isonzo and Piave.

He spent his retirement living with the 5000 lire per month pension from CONI. He died in Rome, at the age of seventy-six, on 1 November 1957.

== Awards ==
- Commander of 'Order of the Crown of Italy (1934)

== See also ==
- Legends of Italian sport - Walk of Fame
