= Chekavar =

Warrior title of the Hindu Thiyya community

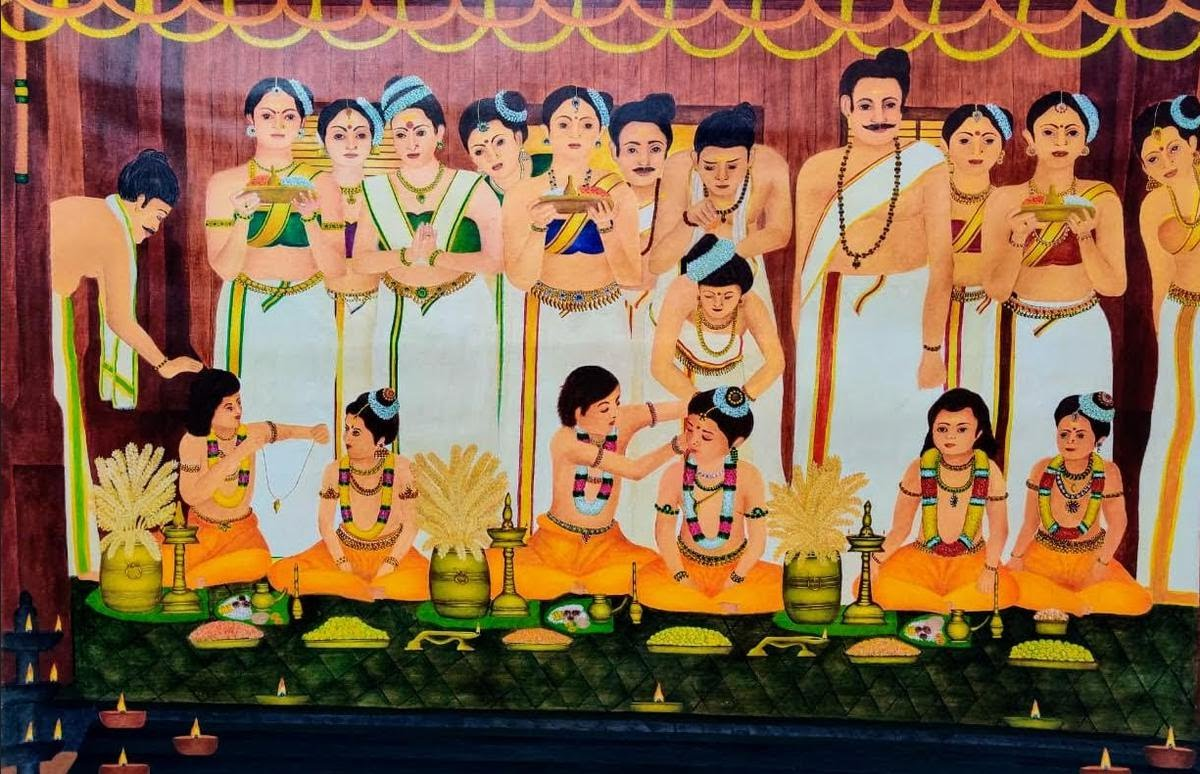
Painting depicting informal childhood marriage ceremony between Unniyarcha and Chandu Chekavar.

Chekavar (also Chekon, Chevakar, or Cekavar) were warriors belonging to Hindu Thiyyar community in Malabar.

== Influence ==
N. Prabhakaran challenges the notion that the Kadathanadan and Chekavar martial traditions have influenced the political violence in Kannur, arguing that the practice of kalaripayattu does not foster violent behaviour or drive the region's history of political killings.

== Etymology ==
Chekavar is derived from the Sanskrit words Sevakar, Sevakan or Sevaka, which mean soldiers in service or soldiers in royal service.

== History ==
Jacob Canter Visscher's Letters from Malabar noted the employment of Nairs as soldiers: "They [Nairs] may be justly entitled born soldiers, as by virtue of their descent they must always bear arms." Quoting Visscher in Jumbos and Jumping Devils (2020), Nisha P. R. stated, "In spite of the fact that Thiyyas were also supreme practitioners of payatt and had a unavoidable presence in the militia of the ruler, they were not allowed in the military services".

Hendrik van Rheede, former governor of Dutch Malabar, in his memorandum of 1677 notes the existence of fencing training: "[...] the tree-climbers, otherwise called silgos, who are also bound to war and arms. These people usually serve to teach the nayros in the fencing school; further their occupation is to tap the coconut tree [...]".

According to Indudharan Menon, "The songs of the Vatakkan pattu (northern ballads) are about a clan of martial Chekavars who were Tiyyas and masters of the martial arts". According to David Levinson and Karen Christensen, "Kalarippayattu was traditionally practiced primarily by Nayars, Kerala's martial caste, as well as by a special sub-caste among Kerala's Brahmans, the Yatra Brahmans; lower-caste practitioners known as chekavar drawn from among special families of Tiyyas; Muslims (especially Sufis in northern Kerala); and Christians".

According to historian A. Sreedhara Menon, the Vadakkan Pattukal were composed in the 17th or 18th century. The stories centre around two main families, one belonging to the Thiyyas and the other to the Nairs. Heroes such as Aromal Chekavar, Unniyarcha, and Aromalunni belongs to the former. The events are set in the medieval principalities of Kolathunadu, Kadathanadu and Kottayam. Menon further notes that Aromal is "said to be an immigrant from Ezhathunad (Sri Lanka)".

== Notable people ==
- Aromal Chekavar
- Unniyarcha
- Chandu Chekavar
- Kuroolli Chekon
- Kathivanoor Veeran
- Kottackkal Kanaran Gurukkal
- Arattupuzha Velayudha Panicker
