= Unniyarcha =

Indian warrior and heroine

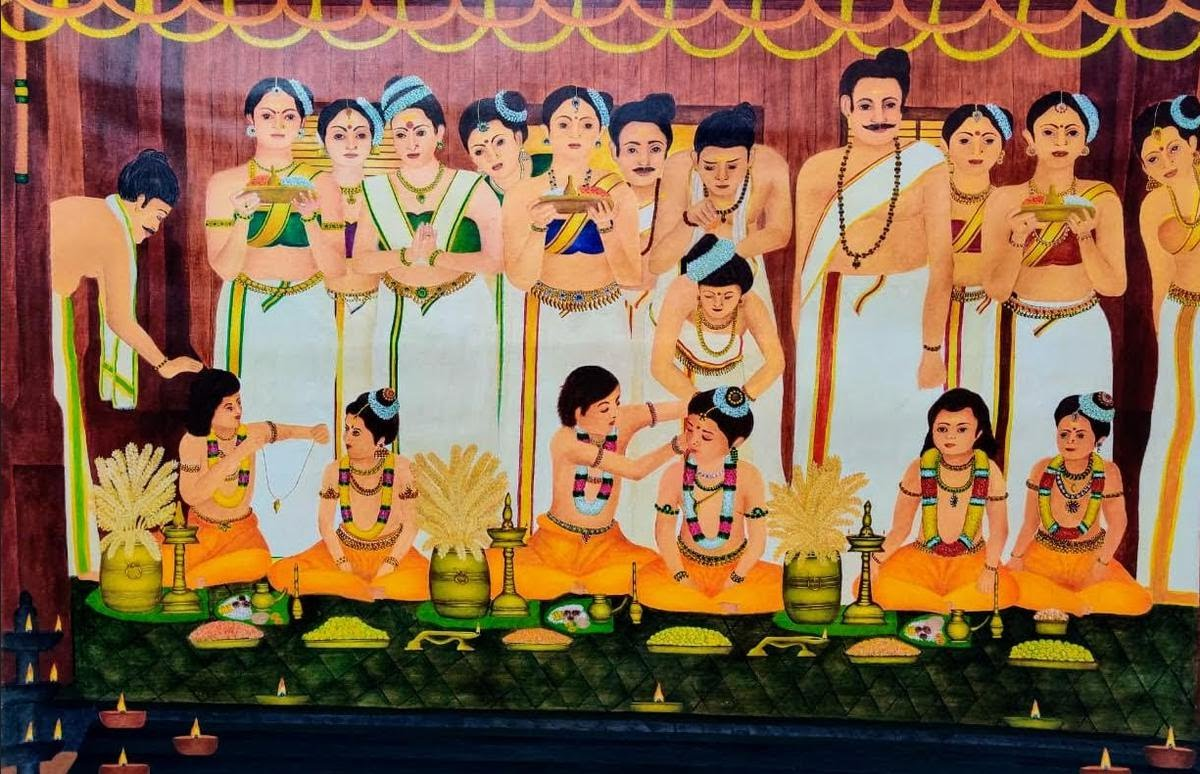
Wedding at ‘Puthooram Veedu’, mock marriage at childhood between Chandu chekavar and unniyarcha as described in a ballad.

Unniyarcha or Puthooramputhri Unniyarcha (ഉണ്ണിയാർച്ച, Malayalam pronunciation: [uɳːijaːrt͡ːʃɐ]) is a legendary warrior and heroine from the 16th century, mentioned in the Vadakkan Pattukal, a set of historical ballads from northern Kerala, a state in southwestern India. She was a member of a Thiyyar community family called Puthooram Veed in Kadathanad. The location of Puthooram Veed is described in the Vadakkan Pattukal as follows: Puthoorampaadam (large paddy field under Puthooram Veed) is situated at the eastern end of Kadathanadu (present-day Vadakara). Ilavanoor Madam is located at the western end of Puthoorampaadam, and within Ilavanoor Madam lies Puthooram Veed.

In the Vadakkan Pattukal, when Unniyarcha beheaded the Mappilas (Jonakars) of Nadapuram with her urumi, the Mappila Moopan, who had tried to capture her with his men, approached several people to negotiate and prevent them from informing Aromal Chekavar or the people at Puthooram Veedu, in order to avoid further retaliation. Finally, they approached the Thamburatti (queen) of Kolathiri. The Thamburatti replied that they had no right to advise Puthooram Veedu, because at the time of the Chera king’s departure, both Kolathiri and Puthooram Veedu were granted equal status,meaning even the king could neither control nor advise them.

Unniyarcha's father's name was Kannappa Chekavar. She is believed to have lived in the northern part of Kerala during the 16th century. She is a popular character in Kerala's folklore and is remembered for her valour and skills in Kerala's native martial art, Kalaripayattu. According to legend, Unniyarcha was mostly known for her deadly skill with the whip-like urumi, a unique type of sword that originates from Kerala. Like most traditional Kalaripayattu practitioners, she began training at the kalari at the age of seven.

There are so many such instances in Vatakkan Pattukal where the warrior heroes or heroines of the stories would win or lose in some of the famous duels of Kalaripayattu. Among these instances, the fight between Unniyarcha and several men with an urumi (specially used for Kalarippayattu) to safeguard herself and her husband from a planned attack by some thieves is very popular.

== Biography ==
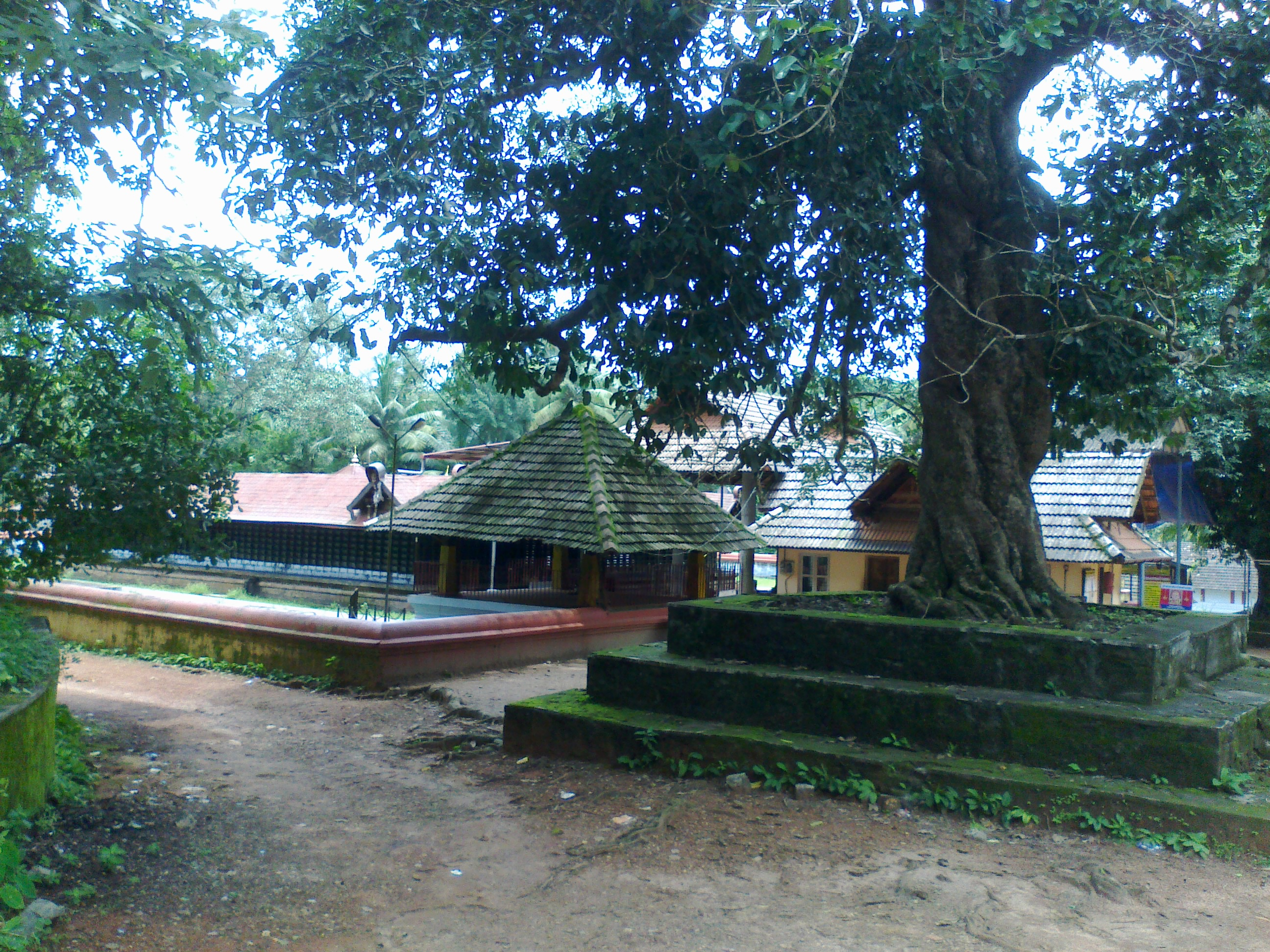
Bhagavathy Temple, Lokanarkavu belonging to Puthooram Veedu

Unniyarcha was from the famous Puthooram Veedu of Kadathanad (Vadakara), a region in northern present-day Kerala. Throughout her life she was often titled Puthooramputhri (daughter of Puthooram house). After her marriage to Kunjiraman she was also referred to as Attummanammel Unniyarcha. Kunjiraman had a kalari known as Puthussery Kalari, which is said to remain in the Kannur district of Kerala to this day. Legend has it that Unniyarcha won 64 kalari ankam in her youth. She was the sister of Aromal Chekavar and Unnikannan. Unniyarcha rejected the romantic advances of Chandu Chekavar (also known as Chanthu Chekavar), which led to the murder of her brother Aromal. Aromalunni, the son of Unniyarcha, later took revenge against Chanthu to avenge his uncle.

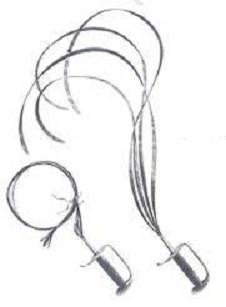
Urumi weapon

== Nadapuram fight ==
According to historian A. Sreedhara Menon, Unniyarcha mastered the technique of warfare in childhood by undergoing a rigorous course of training in the kalari. She married Attummanammel Kunhiraman, and a day later, Unniyarcha set out from home to see the Kuthu in Allimalarkavu, the Vilakku in Ayyappankavu and the Velapuram in Anjanakavu (the version in the ballads). As the Mappilas (Jonakas) in the bazaar on her journey were a much dreaded lot, her husband and relatives did not approve of that. In spite of this, she was determined to go for these festivals. Her husband Kunhiraman had no other alternative but to accompany her. As expected, she was waylaid at Nadapuram by the mappilas. Though Kunhiraman was in jitters, Unniyarcha showed her mettle by facing her adversaries almost single-handed. The headman of the jonakas (mappila), who happened to see her on the way, was enamoured of her beauty and sent his men to carry her away by force. Unniyarcha drew her sword and then proceeded to kill some of them. The rest fled and brought the headman himself to the scene, who soon discovered that she was the sister of his fencing master. He appealed to both the brother and sister to pardon him, but Unniyarcha was inexorable and challenged him and his men to a fight.

The mappilas soon realised that their opponent was none other than the brave sister of Aromal Chekavar, whom their leader had held in great awe and respect. Having realised his mistake, the leader tried to do his best to pacify her, but she would not pardon him without a categorical assurance that women would be allowed to walk along that way without any fear of molestation. Not even the intercession of the wife of the ruling chieftain and the influential Chetti (Chekavar’s friend) would be able to win her over. At last, Aromal Chekavar himself appeared on the scene. Only after the leader made a tendered wholesome apology and offered all kinds of gifts did she calm down and make peace with her adversaries. The chief persuaded the girl to sheath her sword, which she did on the headman’s promise that no woman of the place would be molested in the future.

== In popular culture ==
The legend of Unniyarcha has been made into films such as:

- Unniyarcha (1961)
- Aromalunni (1972)
- Oru Vadakkan Veeragatha (1989)
- Puthooramputhri Unniyarcha (2002)
- A television serial titled Unniyarcha was broadcast on Asianet in (2006).
- Veeram (2016)
