= Constant Lavaux =

Belgian wrestler

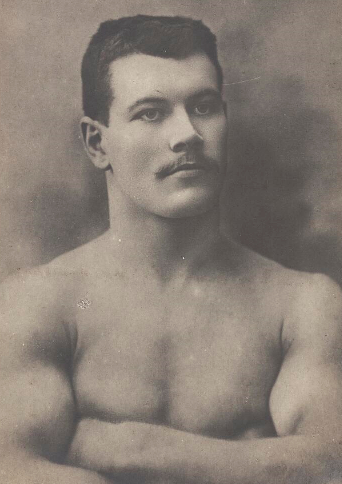
Constant Lavaux

Constant Lavaux (1877–1961), stage name Constant le Boucher ("Constant the Butcher"), was a Belgian wrestler during the sport's Golden Age of 1890–1914.

He was born as a farmer's son in Florennes, Namur province. He took up the trade of butcher at the age of 17, hence his stage name "the Butcher". He came to Paris in 1897 and began to practice wrestling in his free time, eventually joining the gym of famous French wrestler Paul Pons and began his professional career, becoming Pons' master student.

At this time, the creation of modern sport wrestling, known as Greco-Roman wrestling, led to a surge of popularity of the sport throughout Europe, and especially in Paris, which reached its height in the years leading up to World War I. Constant Lauvaux became one of the popular heroes of the sport, and one of the most famous athletes in Europe during this period. Lauvaux came second in the wrestling world championships of both 1900 and 1901 He became famous for his (losing) match with George Hackenschmidt on 19 December in the 1901 tournament, and for his close and gruelling rematch with Hackenschmidt (in which he was however also defeated) on 27 December.
