= Aromal Chekavar =

16th-century warrior in Kerala, India

Aromal Chekavar was a warrior believed to have lived during the 16th century in the North Malabar region of present-day Kerala, India. He was from the Thiyyar community and a chief of the Puthooram family and was thus also known as Puthooram Veettil Aromal Chekavar. He was the elder brother of Unniyarcha and uncle of Aromalunni, who were also skilled warriors.

Chekavar's story is described in the Puthuram Pattukal, a group of songs in the genre of Vadakkan Pattukal, or Northern Ballads, composed in Malayalam during the 17th and 18th centuries. The genre as a whole represents the sentiment of vira, or the heroic, through its depictions of "valour and sacrifice."

== Puthariyankam ==
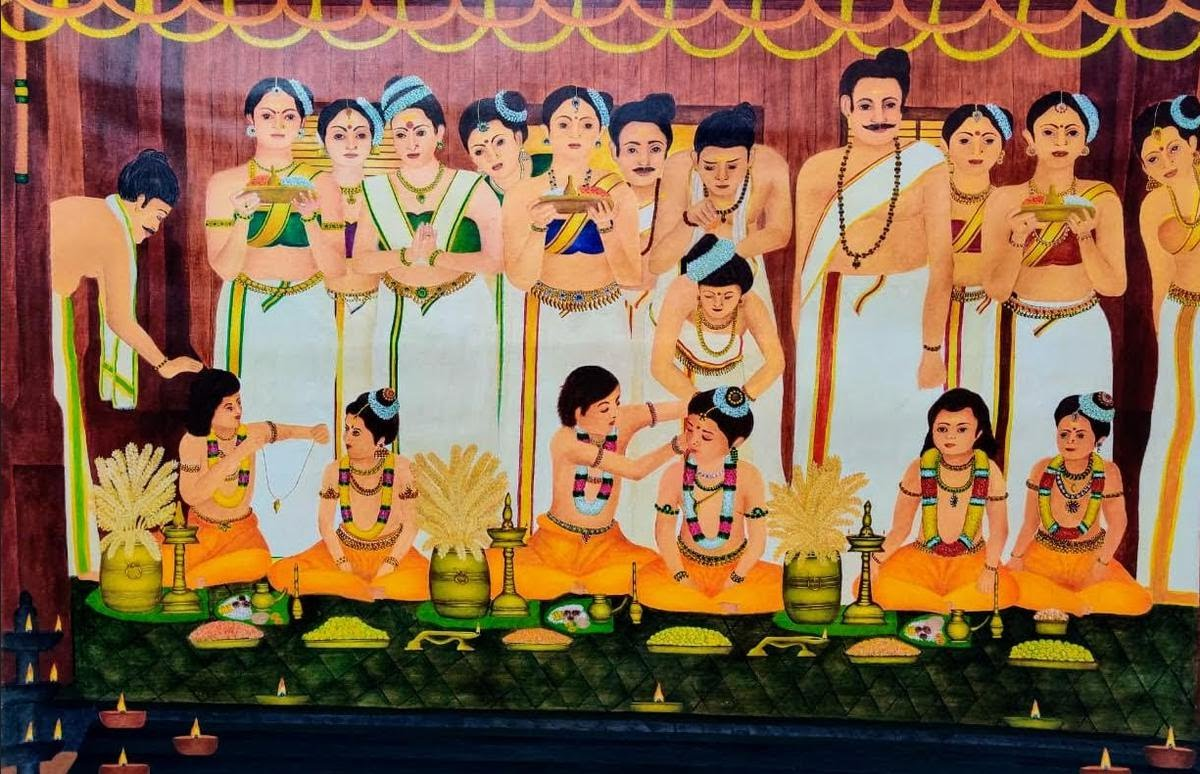
Wedding at ‘Puthooram Veedu’. Painting by Thara Sudhish depicting informal childhood marriage ceremony between Unniyarcha and Chandu Chekavar.

Historian A Sreedhara Menon narrates the story of Aromal Chekavar according to the ballads. According to Menon, Aromal is "said to be an immigrant from Ezhathuna.

Chekavar was expert in ankam fighting, a feudal form of martial combat used to settle disputes, like his father Kannappan. Unni Konar, who was in a property dispute against his brother Unni Chandrador for the estate of their uncle (the kaimal of Kurungadi), hired Aromal Chekavar to represent him in the ankam. Unni Chandrador hired Aringotar, who conspired with Chandu Chekavar, the anti-hero of the story, also a practitioner of kalari and related martial arts, so that Aromal Chekavar fought the battle with a faulty sword. Chandu was Aromal Chekavar's cousin who resented Aromal Chekavar for opposing his marriage with Aromal's sister Unniyarcha.

During the battle, Aromal Chekavar killed Aringotar but collapsed on the field from minor wounds. Chandu Chekavar killed Aromal Chekavar with the rod of his lamp (kuthuvilakku) while Aromal rested with his head in Chandu's lap. Before Aromal Chekavar died, he revealed Chandu's conspiracy to his family. Chandu later married the daughter of Aringotar and inherited Aringotar's estate.

Aromal Chekavar's death was avenged by his nephew Aromalunni Chekavar, who beheaded Chandu in an ankam.

Apart from his sister Unniyarcha, Aromal also had a brother named Unnikannan. His wives were Kunjunnuli and Thumpolarcha of the Mikavil Satteri family. His son Kannapanunni was born to Kunjunnuli, and it is said he also had another son by Thumbolarcha as well.

== In popular culture ==
The story of Aromal Chekavar has influenced media:

- Unniyarcha (1961) and its sequel Aromalunni (1972)
- Oru Vadakkan Veeragatha (1989)
- Puthooramputhri Unniyarcha (2002)
- Unniyarcha, a television serial that aired on Asianet (2006)
- Veeram (2016)
