= A. Sreedhara Menon =

Indian historian (1925–2010)

- A. Sreedhara Menon
- Born: 18 December 1925; Kingdom of Cochin, British India
- Died: 23 July 2010 (aged 84); Thiruvananthapuram, Kerala, India
- Education: Maharaja's College, Cochin (Bachelor's Degree – English); Madras University (Master's Degree – History); Harvard University (Master's Degree – Political Science)
- Occupations: Historian; Academic; University Registrar
- Notable work: Kerala District Gazetteers (Editor, 1958–1968); Triumph and Tragedy in Travancore: Annals of Sir CPs Sixteen Years (2001); A Survey of Kerala History (1967)
- Awards: Padma Bhushan

Alappat Sreedhara Menon (18 December 1925 – 23 July 2010), known as A. Sreedhara Menon, was an Indian historian from Kerala. He is best known as the State Editor (1958–1968) of Kerala District Gazetteers (1961–1975). He served as registrar of the Kerala University from 1968 to 1977, before retiring in 1980.

== Life and education ==
Alappat Sreedhara Menon was born on 18 December 1925 in Ernakulam, in the Kingdom of Cochin (British India). His parents were Kovilakathu Parambil Padmanabha Menon and Alappat Narayani Amma.

Menon passed the Secondary School Leaving Certificate in 1941 with First Class and proceeded to the University of Madras where he passed the Intermediate Examination in 1942 with Distinction in Hindi, Indian History and Modern History. In 1944, supported by a scholarship from the king of Cochin, he completed his Bachelor of Arts from the Maharaja's College, Cochin, winning the Karimpat Rama Menon Gold Medal and the Rama Varma Shashtiabdapurthi Memorial Prize for English. He then continued his Master of Arts at Madras University completing it in 1948 with a First Rank in History. He completed his MA in Political Science, specialising in International Relations from Harvard University in 1953 with the backing of a Fulbright travel grant and a Smith Mundt Scholarship.

From 1944 to 1949, he worked in St. Thomas College, Trichur and subsequently joined the University College, Trivandrum in 1949 in the Department of History and Politics.

Menon received Padma Bhushan, India's third-highest civilian honour, for Literature and Education in 2009.

Menon died on 23 July 2010, aged 84, after some years of suffering ill-health. He was survived by his wife, Sarojini Menon, and two children.

== Academic career ==
In 1953, Sreedhara Menon was granted the Smith Mundt Scholarship and the Fulbright Travel Grant by the US Educational Foundation in India for higher studies at Harvard University where he obtained his master's degree in Political Science, specialising in International Relations.

On his return to India, he was appointed by the Government of Kerala as the first State Editor of Kerala District Gazetteers in 1958. During the next ten years, Menon compiled eight volumes of District Gazetteers (out of nine districts of Kerala) – Trivandrum (1961), Trichur (1961), Calicut (1962), Quilon (1964), Ernakulam (1965), Alleppey (1968), Cannanore (1972), and Kottayam (1975).

From 1968 to 1977, Menon was the Registrar of the Kerala University. He was a visiting professor in the Department of History, University of Calicut under the UGC scheme from 1977 to 1978. From 1979 to 1981 he was a professor at the Institute of Public Administration (now the Institute of Management) under the Government of Kerala. Menon was a member of the editorial board of journals including the Journal of Indian History and Journal of Kerala Studies, both published by the Department of History, University of Kerala. In 2000 Menon was elected the President of Visakhapatnam South Indian History Congress.

== Political views ==
Menon was known for his opposition to the Marxist Communist Party of India.

Menon refused to write a history of Indian anti-colonial movement in Kerala for the Congress Party because he "did not want to be known as a historian of the Congress". The Communist Party of India (Marxist)-led coalition government in Kerala requested Menon in 1997 to write on Indian anti-colonial movement in Kerala "in consultation with E. M. S. Namboodiripad". The book was never published by the Government of Kerala and Menon withdrew from the task. He remarked on the issue, "It is not an objective historian's job to collect facts to suit theories. A true historian is a judge and not a lawyer... politicians can act only as lawyers."

== Awards ==
- Scholarship from the Maharaja of Cochin (1944)
- Smith Mundt Scholarship and the Fulbright Travel Grant (1953)
- 1990: INDIS award from the Centre for Interdisciplinary Studies, Thiruvananthapuram
- 1999: Senior Fellowship ICHR
- 2000: National Fellowship ICHR
- 2009: Padma Bhushan for Literature and Education

== Publications ==
Sreedhara Menon published nearly 25 books in English and Malayalam.

English

- Kerala District Gazetteers (Editor, 1958–1968)
  - Trivandrum (1961)
  - Trichur (1961)
  - Calicut (1962)
  - Quilon (1964)
  - Ernakulam (1965)
  - Alleppey (1968)
  - Cannanore (1972)
  - Kottayam (1975).
- A Survey of Kerala History. Sahitya Pravarthaka Co-operative Society. 1967. OCLC 555508146.
- Cultural Heritage of Kerala: An Introduction. East-West Publications. 1978. OCLC 475358916.
- Social and cultural history of Kerala. Sterling. 1979. OCLC 6629548.
- The Legacy of Kerala (1983)
- A Political History of Modern Kerala (1987)
- Kerala History and its Makers (1987)
- A Concise History of Modern Kerala (1987)
- Modern India – A History Since 1707
- Triumph and Tragedy in Travancore: Annals of Sir CPs Sixteen Years (2001)
- Indian History translated by R. Manoj Varma (DC Books, 2021)

Malayalam

- Kerala Charithram and Samskaram (1967)
- Kerala Charithra Shilpikal

== See also ==
- M. G. S. Narayanan
- K. N. Panikkar
