= Vadakkan Pattukal =

Song

Vadakkan Pattukal (lit. 'the ballads of the north') are a collection of Malayalam ballads from the medieval period (12th-20th century). The genre as a whole represents the sentiment of vira, or the heroic, through its depictions of "valour and sacrifice."

== Contents ==
The songs present stories of heroes such as Aromal Chekavar and Thacholi Othenan, and heroines like Unniyarcha. The stories centre around the fortunes of two families, Puthooram family and Thacholi Manikkoth family. Though the two families belong to two different castes or communities, Thiyyar and Nair respectively, they have a shared martial traditional. The chief among the Thiyyar chieftains of Puthooram was Aromal Chekavar, who had been killed by his cousin Chanthu Chekavar in his first duel (Ankam) by deceit. His sister, Attumanamel Unniyarcha, is equally adept in the use of arms. The exploits of the Nair chieftain, Thacholi Othenan, belonging to the Thacholi family, form the theme of several ballads. The last duel Othenan fought was with his own guru, called Mathiloor Gurukkal, who was from the Ganaka caste. Thandasseri Chappan, who was the best friend and all time companion of Othenan, was from Thiyyar caste. They always travel together and fight together. Vadakkan Patt also talks about other strong women like Poomathayi Ponnamma. They exemplify the heights of folk-poetry and are also sometimes associated with deities. Almost all these ballads show strong connections to Kalaripayattu. The oldest compositions do not date earlier than 16th century but their idiom and vocabulary seem older. However, like any other oral cultural forms that are sung by communities even today, these songs show great flexibility and a repetitive pattern in their lexicon that is typical of the simplicity of folksongs in general.

== Composition and dating ==
The ballads are generally thought to have taken shape between the 16th and 18th centuries, around and after the time of Thunchaththu Ezhuthachan, although the warriors they celebrate may have lived earlier. They were composed in the colloquial Malayalam of North Malabar and were carried down orally for generations, absorbing minor additions and omissions while their core narratives survived largely intact.

== Classification ==
The ballads are usually grouped into two cycles named for the families whose exploits they narrate. The Puthooram songs centre on the Thiyya Chekavar family of Puthooram, and include the stories of Aromal Chekavar, his kinswoman Unniyarcha, his son Aromalunni and the treacherous Chandu. The Thacholi songs centre on the Nair house of Thacholi Manikkoth in Kadathanad and are built around Thacholi Othenan and his kin; they are generally regarded as later than the Puthooram cycle, dating to about the 17th century.

== Themes and social background ==
The ballads are set in the feudal society of North Malabar, in regions such as Kadathanad, Kolathunadu and Wayanad that were noted for Kalaripayattu training. A recurring subject is the ankam, a formal duel to the death fought by professional warrior-champions known as Chekavars on behalf of chieftains or families, so that disputes were settled by single combat rather than by wider conflict.

== Performance and transmission ==
The ballads were carried across the region by the Panans, a community of wandering bards and they survived as a living oral tradition sung by working communities. Several of the heroes came to be venerated as local deities and are invoked in the Theyyam ritual performances of North Malabar, in which Kalaripayattu movements are woven into the enactment of warrior-deities.

== In popular culture ==
The ballads have been a recurring source for Malayalam cinema. One of the best-known adaptations is Oru Vadakkan Veeragatha (1989), written by M. T. Vasudevan Nair and directed by Hariharan, which retells the Aromal–Chandu episode from the point of view of Chandu, the villain of the traditional ballads, recasting him as a wronged and tragic figure.

== Sources ==
- Menon, A. Sreedhara (4 March 2011). Kerala History and its Makers. D C Books. ISBN 978-81-264-3782-5.
- Narayanan, M.T. (2003), Agrarian Relations in Late Medieval Malabar, Northern Book Centre
