= List of Ezhavas =

The Ezhava are a prominent community in Kerala making up approximately 25% of the state's population. The following is a list of notable members of the Ezhava community.

== Dynasty ==
- Mannanar

== Legendary characters ==
- Cheerappanchira Panicker - Martial ( Kalary) Guru of Swamy Ayyappan, Father of Malikappurathamma- 13/ 14 century.
- Itty Achudan vaidyar - famous physician
- Aromal Chekavar
- Unniyarcha

== Spiritual leaders ==
- Narayana Guru (1855- 1928)

== Literature ==
- Kumaran Asan (1873 - 1924) – also known as Mahakavi Kumaran Asan
- Muloor S. Padmanabha Panicker (1869-1931) – poet and prominent social reformer
- C. V. Kunhiraman (1871-1949) – founder of Kerala Kaumudi, writer and journalist
- O. V. Vijayan (1930-2005) - Indian author (Khasakkinte Itihasam) and cartoonist

== Politics ==
=== Chief Ministers ===
- C. Kesavan - former Chief Minister of Travancore-Cochin
- R. Sankar - former Chief Minister of Kerala. First Congress leader to become Chief Minister, and first Ezhava to hold the post.
- V. S. Achuthanandan-former Chief Minister of Kerala, veteran Communist leader.
- Pinarayi Vijayan - incumbent Chief Minister of Kerala.

== Social reformers ==
- Padmanabhan Palpu
- Arattupuzha Velayudha Panicker, ne 'Mangalam Vazhunnor Velayudha Perumal'
- T. K. Madhavan
