= Arattupuzha Velayudha Panicker =

Social reformer and warrior in Kerala (1825–1874)

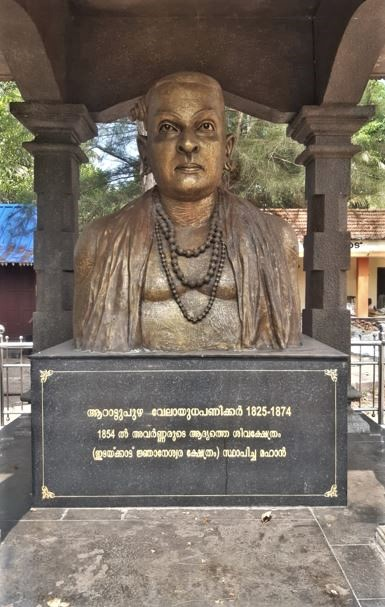
Arattupuzha Velayudha Panicker (1825 – 1874) Arattupuzha Velayudha Panicker Memorial near Mangalam Shiva Temple at Karthikappally of Alappuzha district, Kerala

Arattupuzha Velayudha Panicker, also known as Kallisseril Velayudha Perumal (7 January 1825 – 3 January 1874), was a 19th-century social reformer and warrior, known for his fight against many social evils prevalent in the state of Kerala. He was born into an affluent Ezhava family known as Kallisseril, in the small independent province called Mangalam, near Haripad in Alappuzha district.

== Early life ==
Arattupuzha Velayudha Panicker was born into the Kallisseril Tharavad (also known as the Valiya Kadavil family), in a small independent province called 'Mangalam', in Arattupuzha, Haripad, Karthikapally Taluk of Alappuzha district. Kallisseril was a wealthy and influential Ezhava family of the region, with a martial arts lineage. His maternal grandfather was Valiya Kadavil Perumal Chekon, also known as Perumalachan. Velayudha Panicker's mother was Perumalachan's eldest daughter. His father was Kuttithara Govinda Panicker, who hailed from Eruva, in Kayamkulam.

Velayudha Panicker's forefathers were successful merchants, who had trade relations with Arab, Kutch and Sinhalese traders. The Kallisseril family owned their own cargo ships for foreign trade and, was the owners of acres of coconut plantations, paddy fields and farm lands around the region.

Velayudha Panicker was home tutored and imparted a good education by his grandfather, Perumalachan. Velayudha Panicker became proficient in the languages Sanskrit, Malayalam and Tamil. In his adolescence, large wrestling matches and Kalari practices were organized by his grandfather in Arattupuzha. Velayudha Panicker grew up to be an expert in wrestling and became an exponent in the Kerala martial arts, Kalaripayattu. He excelled in swimming and was also an expert horseback rider.

After the death of his grandfather, Velayudha Panicker inherited the family properties and took over the family rule.

He married Velumbi Panickathi, a member of the Varanappally Tharavad, which is a renowned Ezhava family of Kayamkulam. Velumbi and Velayudha Panicker had seven children.

== Legacy ==
Arattupuzha Velayudha Panicker is considered to be the first notable person to challenge the Savarnas of Kerala, and it led to many legendary struggles on behalf of both women and men, against the upper caste domination.

Arattupuzha Velayudha Panicker built a temple called the Mangalam Shiva temple (also known as Edakkad Jnaneswara Temple) in Arattupuzha. Built in 1852, the temple opened its door to people of all castes and religions.

In 1859, Arattupuzha Velayudha Panicker spearheaded the Achipudava Samaram (strike for the right to wear lengthy lower garment, extending below the knees, by the women of backward communities) at Kayamkulam. He further organized the Karshaka Thozhilali Samaram, the first ever strike by agricultural labourers in Kerala, and succeeded.

Ethappu Samaram of 1859 (strike for the right to wear upper cloth by the women of backward communities) led by Velayudha Panicker was a continuation of the Achipudava Samaram.

Velayudha Panicker headed the Mukkuthi Samaram of 1860 (strike for the right to wear nose studs and other gold ornaments by women belonging to marginalised communities ) in Pandalam.

The successful outcomes of these 19th century struggles, organized and led by Velayudha Panicker, played pivotal role in elevating the dignity of marginalised women in the society.

Velayudha Panicker established the first Kathakali (the classical dance form of Kerala) Yogam for Ezhavas in 1861. Kathakali performed by Ezhavas and members of other backward communities, was staged for the first time.

In 1869, on his way to Padmanabhaswamy temple for the Murajapam (the chanting of prayers and recitation of three Vedas performed for a period of 56 days), Brahmin priest Tharananellur Nambudiri, was robbed of his Salagramam (sacred stone) in the backwaters of Kayamkulam. Both the palace and police officials failed to find Kayamkulam Kochunni, who stole the Salagramam, after which, Arattupuzha Velayudha Panicker, was enlisted with the task, who eventually captured him and submitted him to the Diwan. Panicker was honoured by the King for capturing the robbers and recovering the Salagramam back to Tharananellur Nambudiri, Velayudha Chekavar was given the title “Panicker” by the king of Travancore.

In 1874, a few upper caste men plotted against Velayudha Panicker and, murdered him in his sleep in the darkness of night during a boat journey, using the help of a converted Ezhava Muslim, Thoppiyitta Kittan. Velayudha Panicker was 48 years old at the time of his death.

Arattupuzha Velayudha Panicker was the first martyr of Kerala Renaissance.

A research centre now exists called The Arattupuzha Velayudha Panicker Research Foundation and Cultural Centre.

== In popular culture ==
Indian filmmaker Vinayan directed Pathonpatham Noottandu, a Malayalam-language biopic based on Arattupuzha Velayudha Panicker's life, with Siju Wilson in the role of Velayudha Panicker.

Kerala Chief Minister, Pinarayi Vijayan, released a documentary, Munpe Nadannavan based on the life of Arattupuzha Velayudha Panicker, directed by U K Sreejith Bhaskar, on 25 August 2022.

== See also ==
- Kuroolli Chekon
- Channar revolt
- Breast tax
