= Kattan dynasty =

Ancient dynasty

•

The Kattan dynasty (or Khattan) was an old royal Thiyya dynasty that ruled over Puralimala in what is now Kannur and Wayanad, India. The Kattan dynasty is headquartered in the valley of Puralimala. It is also known as the Malayodan Dynasty. The name is derived from the word (Malayalam Ghattan), which means mountain king, and Malaydayon from the name Malãyudayon.Their favourite drink was Kattan Tea with no sugar and milk and hence the name kattan was derived as per local belief. Perumal was the family deity of the Kattan dynasty and they also had Naga worship. Perumal is Shiva. These families live here as two branches and although they belong to the same family, Pula and Valaima do not observe each other. They do not observe Pula and Velaima so as not to disturb the worship of Perumal. One branch has the status of being the oldest in the family and the second being the youngest. They were given the title after the reign of rice, and were in the audience of Tarailachans and locals. The ceremony is being held under the auspices of the Mathilur Gurukkal and hence is believed to be the continuation of the cheras.
