= Cherayi Panicker =

Cherayi Panicker Malayalam: [chéræ pàn:kâr] was an army Commander-in-chief of the Zamorin dynasty in 13th centuries. That was a status or title given by the Zamorin to selected Thiyyar families in the Malappuram district and the adjoining Thrissur district. Today descendants of two branches reside in present day Ponnani taluk and Chavakkad area of Thrissur district. In the past, the Panikanmars were the main soldiers of the Zamorin king. they fought bravely in Zamorin warfare with Mysore troops. Cherai Kalari was very popular at that time i still exists

== Commander in War ==
According to M.S.A.Rao "The Thiyyar formed part of the army of the Zamorin of Calicut, which fought against Hyder Ali and Tipu Sultan. The Zamorin bestowed upon thiyya army head in the North Malabar, the title of cherayi panikkar (proficient in arm)". The Cherayi Panickars in Ponnani taluk were reputed for their proven mastery over the war science and their excellence in the tactics of swordsmanship. They were given privileges at par with the nobles and lords by the Zamootiri.

== History ==
The position of Cherai Panikkar is a name given by Samuthiri. A very famous Kalari temple in South Malabar belongs to the Cherai Panikkans. The size of Cherai Kalari is forty feet. After studying in the country, Thacholi Othenan studied at Kalari for two years. Othenan came here to learn the technique of vagal or 'pak', which involves training in a large well dug to a specific extent in layers, and some other rare techniques. From this it can be understood that the fame of Cherai Kalari reached North Malabar years ago (this is the ancestral home of the Cherai Kalari of Malabar in the 13th century Northern songs).

This tharavaat has the Kalarithara and the Kavu, which houses the Karimani Nagam, who has accumulated centuries of experience. The father and gurus who founded Kalari in the early days, the idol of "Gurukalachha" and Lord Ganesha with Lakshmi, Shiva deity are still preserved there. Valachan Sword and Muchan Way are still preserved here. Two brothers of the original family had a disagreement about the Angam and one brother divided the Cherai land into two and established another Kalari. Crossing the Purappadan bridge, a temple and a kalari were erected near the Kanoli Canal on the west, which later became known as the Cherai Padinjakara kalari. The Panikars who were the origin of the family were known as Cherai Kizhakkekara Kalari.

There are special ponds here for warriors going to wars and Mamangam to take ritual bath and fast. The Moolasthana temple with four knots has been preserved without much change even today. The Samuthiri had authorized them to march and conduct kalari from Chetua in Ponnani taluk to Changaramkulam Narani river on the Arabian Sea. Two generations ago Kunjunnipanikars and Unni Panikars were the last Kalari Asanas. Realizing that they would have to lay down their arms during the Malabar Rebellion, when the British banned Kalari, proud clansmen buried their weapons in a nearby well, along with valuables and other palm fronds, to escape humiliation.

Legend has it that many places, lands and power were acquired by the Cherais because they had sent a group of soldiers to the Samoothiri in Mamangam. These clans had special authority with the Kodungallur temple. History has it that the altar on the north side of the Kodungallur Temple belonged to the Cherai Panikkars. The Mukkuvas, who are fishermen in the Arabian Sea, used to keep a share of the catch in their family till the next generation. Food and rice will be given in return.

== Mamangam ==
Kander Menon's songs describe the heroic history of Kandar Menon of Vatonneveet and his son Ithappu, who went to Tirunnavaya and fought against the soldiers of the Samothiri at Mamangam in the year 1683 of year. Kandar Menon and Ithappu who reached the stage on the day of Mamanka and reached the stage by bravely fighting many of the Zamorin army and reached the stage. Unniraman, a soldier of the Samuthir in Madappuram, who saw him approaching the Samuthir, killed Ithapu with a sword.Immediately Kander Menon jumped into the crowd and Nambioli, who was standing in front of Cherai Panicker (Chettuvayi), cut down the doctors and collided with Cherai Panicker, a scholar. Cherai Panicker, who has been pitied many times, had a tough fight with Menon. Before Kander Menon, all the efforts of the builders failed and his hand began to grow weak and limp. That's when Panicker made a fake. It slashed at Menon's thigh, causing Kander Menon to fall to his knees on the floor. Menon, who was about to fall and die, looked at Panicker's Nabi and kicked him before dying.after that one kick own the marma point (pressure point)of the nabi area panicker also died.

== See also ==
- Zamorin
- Panicker
- Mannanar dynasty
