= Alluri (film) =

- Theatrical release poster
- Directed by: Pradeep Varma
- Written by: Pradeep Varma
- Produced by: Bekkem Venugopal
- Starring: Sree Vishnu; Kayadu Lohar; Tanikella Bharani; Suman
- Cinematography: Raj Thota
- Edited by: Dharmendra Kakarala
- Music by: Harshavardhan Rameshwar
- Production company: Lucky Media
- Release date: 23 September 2022
- Running time: 169 minutes
- Country: India
- Language: Telugu
- Budget: ₹5 crores
- Box office: ₹7.72 crores

Alluri is a 2022 Indian Telugu-language crime drama film directed by Pradeep Varma and starring Sree Vishnu (in the titular role) and Kayadu Lohar.

The film follows the son of a retired police constable, who learns about the life of another police officer, Alluri Sita Ramaraju.

== Plot ==
The film starts with Iqbal, a police aspirant tired of attempting the police exams. His father Naseeruddin is a retired constable and tells him about a police officer named Alluri Sita Ramaraju at the Kothavalasa police station.

Past: On his first day of joining the force, Ramaraju rejected his bribe share, angering his corrupt superior. Later, he became a friendly cop to Kothavalasa. On one of his cases, Ramaraju arrests a criminal and submits him to court, despite pressure from the superintendent. After that incident, the angered superintendent transfers Ramaraju to Dharakonda, a notorious Naxalite area. There, Iqbal learns that Ramaraju told the Naxalites how the police have reformed and took their help to build a police station in Dharakonda.

Then, Naseeruddin tells Iqbal that Ramaraju was transferred to Vizag as a Circle Inspector. There, his parents made him marry Sandhya, a native of Vizag. He tussles with Shiva Shankar, the MP of Vizag, by dealing a case of eve teasing by his son. Meanwhile, he learns about a notorious rowdy sheeter named Kali, who controls the Poorna Market in Vizag and is Shiva Shankar's right-hand man. When Ramaraju arrests Kali, his higher officer releases Kali and asks Ramaraju to meet Shiva Shankar. There, Ramaraju challenges Shiva Shankar to change him soon.

One day, a girl files a case against Shiva Shankar's son and his friends that they are selling drugs in her college. Ramaraju encourages her, makes her file the complaint, and arrests Shiva Shankar's son. However, the superintendent will not file the complaint and releases him. Enraged, Ramaraju attempts to attack the superintendent, who then complains to the DIG. The DIG has a good impression of Ramaraju, who advises him to control his anger while stopping corruption, but Ramaraju slaps the superintendent in front of the DIG. The DIG suspends the superintendent for two weeks on the insistence of Ramaraju as a disciplinary action.

Ramaraju takes Sandhya to celebrate their honeymoon. After they came back to Vizag, in the airport, his constables received Ramaraju in an emergency at a hospital. There, Ramaraju saw the girl who gave him the complaint against Shiva Shankar's son. The constable describes to Ramaraju that Kali, Shiva Shankar's son, and his friend raped the girl in front of her father. Then, the girl's father scolds Ramaraju for arresting Shiva Shankar's son. Enraged at Shiva Shankar's son, his friend, and Kali, Ramaraju takes the girl to the market, which is controlled by Kali, and keeps the girl on a pillar where the flag is hosted. Ramaraju keeps a sharp coconut-peeling spear in the girl's hand; thrashes Kali's men to death; and kills Kali, Shiva Shankar's son, and his friend by stabbing their throats to the spear, and the girl dies. When Ramaraju comes in police uniform, everyone says that the girl came from the hospital and killed the three people.

Present: When Iqbal returned to his house, he asks to meet Ramaraju. Then, Naseeruddin reveals that Ramaraju passed away in a terrorist attack. Naseeruddin advises Iqbal to meet the DIG (now the commissioner of Hyderabad) to learn what happened.

Past: After that incident, Ramaraju was transferred to the traffic police. One day, the commissioner calls Ramaraju to his guest house. There, he assigns him a duty to find out the terrorist activities in the Mir Ali Bagh and sends him to Hyderabad. There, Naseeruddin meets Ramaraju for the first time and becomes inspired by his attitude. Then, Ramaraju orders them to be friendly cops with the locals and encourages them to do public service in the field.

One day, Ramaraju receives a missing complaint from a girl through Naseeruddin. However, Ramaraju convinces the girl's parents to receive a complaint. In the investigation, Ramaraju finds that she was kidnapped to a hotel with a car whose number plate is fake. Then he finds out that there is another floor between the 12th and 13th floors in that hotel. When he and his assistant went into that floor, they observed the missing female student's handbag on the floor, which they saw in the lift's CCTV footage.

Ramaraju gets threatening calls to stop the investigation, scaring Sandhya. But one day, when Sandhya and Ramaraju's mother were getting vegetables from the market, Ramaraju's mother met with an accident in the same car where the female student was kidnapped. Then, Ramaraju finds the car through his sources, leading him to a garage where the men kidnapped the girl. He thrashes them down and takes them into custody. Then, the gang reveals that they are organizing female trafficking on the secret floor of the hotel. Being a journalism student, the girl attempted to gather information regarding the secret floor, but they found and killed her. Ramaraju rescues the girls whom they kidnapped earlier and gave them to their families.

One day, a mechanic came to the police station complaining about a boy named Ali, who is very suspicious in his garage. When Naseeruddin and another constable went to the garage to get Ali to the police station for the inquiry, a group of terrorists killed one of the constables and took Ali with them. Naseeruddin informs Ramaraju that he knew that Ali is a terrorist gang leader. Then, Ramaraju and his team search and arrest them in a mosque.

Later, Ramaraju and Sandhya were attacked by a sharpshooter, later arrested by the commissioner, who reveals that a former Naxalite avenges Ramaraju for his past activities on Dharakonda, and that is why he tries to kill him to rise the movement. This incident makes Sandhya face PTSD, and she leaves for Vizag.

But one day, Ali and his terrorist group hijack a school, where so many celebrity children, including the commissioner's daughters, are studying. Ali demands the release of the terrorists whom Ramaraju and his team arrested. The higher officials think to involve the NSG commandos in a commando operation, but Ramaraju convinces the commissioner to conduct the operation by themselves; the commissioner eventually accepts. Then, Ramaraju selects the top cadets from the department; attacks and kills the terrorists one by one without getting captured in the CCTV camera; and made Ali believe that their men are in the same place. However, Ali gets doubtful and threatens Ramaraju to surrender by captivating the commissioner's daughter in the conference room of the school. When Ramaraju goes into the conference room, Ali's henchman hits him on his head with a trophy and makes him unconscious.

Then, Ramaraju's cadets hear the sound of two shots as a signal from Ramaraju. They rescue the staff and students, including the commissioner's daughter and principal outside. Sandhya is watching the news on TV about this, but unfortunately, Ramaraju is killed.

During the commissioner's speech describing the greatness of Ramaraju, the school principal comes with a CD and plays it. The CD shows how Ramaraju became martyred. Ali and his henchman thrash Ramaraju after tying him to a pillar in front of the principal and commissioner's daughter. Then they force Ramaraju to say jihad, which he refuses to do. Enraged, Ali makes his henchman castrate Ramaraju, and Ali points his gun at the commissioner's daughter. However, Ramaraju manages to untie his knots and kills Ali and his henchman using Ali's henchman's gun by saying "Jai Hind" and dies. Watching the video, everyone salutes Ramaraju in the hall, including his parents and Sandhya.

Present: Finally, the film ends with Iqbal asking for Ramaraju's photo, and when the commissioner shows it, Iqbal salutes the photo and decides to pursue his ambition.

== Cast ==
- Sree Vishnu as CI Alluri Sitarama Raju
- Kayadu Lohar as Alluri Sandhya, Ramaraju's wife
- Ravi Varma Adduri as Kaali, a notorious rowdy sheeter who controls a market in Vizag
- Suman as DIG (later Commissioner)
- Tanikella Bharani as Naseeruddin, a retired constable and Iqbal's father
- Raja Ravindra as SP
- Prudhvi Raj as CI when Ramaraju is SI
- Madhusudhan Rao as MP Shiva Shankar
- Pramodini Pammi as Mrs. Alluri, Ramaraju's mother
- Vadlamani Srinivas as Mr. Alluri, Ramaraju's father
- Vasu Inturi as Shankar, a journalist in Dharakonda
- Vennela Rama Rao as Ramaraju's assistant
- Jayavani

== Reception ==
A critic from The Times of India wrote that "However, despite solid performances, the film goes downhill after the interval with more conflicts to resolve, routine setting in; and its overarching timeline is its nemesis". A critic from 123telugu said that "On the whole, Alluri does engage only in a few scenes".
