= Immortal (2026 film) =

- Theatrical release poster
- Directed by: Mariyappan Chinna
- Written by: Mariyappan Chinna
- Produced by: Arunkumar Dhanasekaran
- Starring: G. V. Prakash Kumar; Kayadu Lohar
- Cinematography: Arun Radhakrishnan
- Edited by: M. Rajesh
- Music by: Sam C. S.
- Production company: AK Film Factory
- Distributed by: Sakthi Film Factory
- Release date: 4 September 2026
- Running time: 131 minutes
- Country: India
- Language: Tamil

Immortal is a 2026 Indian Tamil-language romantic horror film written and directed by newcomer Mariyappan Chinna. The film stars G. V. Prakash Kumar and Kayadu Lohar. The cast also includes T. M. Karthik, Kumar Natarajan, Lollu Sabha Maaran, Aaditya Kathir, Arshu Maharjan, Pema Tsamchoe, and Sunita Shrestha. Shot between May 2025 and May 2026, the film was released on 4 September 2026.

== Plot ==
The film opens about 1,000 years ago, showing a tribal couple who have a child under mysterious circumstances. The child is revealed to be something beyond an ordinary human, establishing the supernatural evil that forms the foundation of the story. The events surrounding this creature remain connected to the present day.

The story then shifts to present-day Chennai, where Magi, a young man working at a printing press, is struggling to find an affordable place to live. During his search, he meets Sindhu, a mysterious woman who lives alone in a luxurious apartment. She offers him accommodation for a surprisingly cheap rent, and Magi accepts the opportunity without knowing what is really waiting for him inside the apartment.

After moving in, Magi becomes comfortable around Sindhu and gradually develops an attraction towards her. Their interactions become increasingly intimate, and Magi begins believing that he has found both a place to stay and someone he genuinely likes. However, certain incidents inside the apartment begin making him suspicious, as Sindhu’s behaviour becomes increasingly strange and difficult to understand.

As Magi spends more time with her, he starts noticing clues that something is seriously wrong. The apartment has an unsettling atmosphere, and Sindhu appears to be hiding something about herself. Magi eventually begins investigating the mystery and discovers that the woman he has fallen for is not an ordinary human being.

Magi learns that Sindhu is a supernatural creature connected to an ancient evil that has existed for centuries. She uses her beautiful human appearance to attract men, brings them into her world, and feeds on their blood. The men who fall for her ultimately become her victims. Magi realizes with horror that the seemingly harmless arrangement that brought him into her apartment was actually part of a deadly trap.

When Magi understands the danger, he tries to escape, but Sindhu’s supernatural abilities make it extremely difficult. The apartment effectively becomes a place from which he cannot easily get away. Magi desperately searches for a way to survive while trying to understand Sindhu’s powers and the truth behind her existence.

However, Sindhu’s relationship with Magi becomes different from her previous encounters with men. She begins developing genuine feelings for him and becomes emotionally attached to him. This creates a conflict within her because, although her supernatural nature drives her to kill, she does not want to lose Magi. Magi nevertheless understands that her feelings do not completely remove the danger she poses.

As the situation becomes more dangerous, Magi realizes that simply escaping Sindhu will not solve the problem. If she remains alive, she can continue attracting and killing other people. He therefore decides to confront her and put an end to the threat.

The story reaches its climax when Magi and Sindhu engage in a final struggle. What began as an unexpected accommodation and a romantic relationship turns into a fight for survival. Magi manages to overpower Sindhu and kills her, ending the supernatural threat and preventing her from claiming more victims.

The film concludes with Magi surviving the terrifying experience and the immediate danger finally coming to an end. The story ultimately revolves around how an ordinary young man’s chance encounter with a mysterious woman leads him into a centuries-old supernatural nightmare.

== Cast ==
- G. V. Prakash Kumar as Maghi
- Kayadu Lohar as Sindhu
- T. M. Karthik as Akash
- Kumar Natarajan
- Lollu Sabha Maaran as Magi's uncle
- Aaditya Kathir as Magi's friend
- Arshu Maharjan
- Pema Tsamchoe
- Sunita Shrestha

== Production ==
In early May 2025, G. V. Prakash Kumar and Kayadu Lohar were announced to be teaming up with director Mariyappan Chinna for a film whose title was yet to be decided. The title was announced as Immortal on 9 May. Lohar was approached after the director was impressed with her performance in the 2022 Malayalam film Pathonpatham Noottandu. Principal photography began in May 2025, and wrapped a year later on 18 May 2026.

== Soundtrack ==
Immortal

Soundtrack album by Sam C. S.
- Released: 4 September 2026
- Venue: Chennai
- Studio: Psalter Record Inn Pvt Ltd.
- Genre: Feature film soundtrack
- Length: 16:29
- Language: Tamil
- Label: Think Music

Sam C. S. chronology
Varavu (2026)	Immortal (2026)	Sardar 2 (2026)
External audio
- Immortal – Jukebox on YouTube

Sam C. S. composed music for the film collaborating Prakash Kumar after Siren and Blackmail. The first single "Love-u Love-u Kaatteri" was released in June 2026 and second single "She is My Chellakutty" was released on 27 July 2026.

Track listing
No.	Title	Lyrics	Singer(s)	Length
1.	"Pimbilikka Pilaappi"	Gana Guna	Na. Idhaya	2:48
2.	"Othayila Naanu"	Sathyan Ilanko	G. V. Prakash Kumar	3:16
3.	"Cold Hunt"	Sharanya Gopinath	Sharanya Gopinath	3:19
4.	"Love-u Love-u Kaatteri"	Shalli C	Sam C. S., Shalli C	3:30
5.	"She is My Chellakutty"	Sam C. S., Thamizh Aadhavan	Adithya RK	3:36
Total length:				16:29

== Release ==
Immortal was initially scheduled to release in theatres on 23 July 2026, but got postponed to 4 September 2026 to avoid a box office clash with Jana Nayagan which secured a 23 July release. The film was cleared by the CBFC in mid-August. It was distributed by Sakthi Film Factory in Tamil Nadu.

In late August, the Tamil Film Producers Council (TFPC) and the Tamil Film Active Producers Association (TFAPA), due to a dispute with film distributors and exhibitors, announced that Tamil films cannot release or complete filming or post-production works from 1 September 2026 onwards, the film's release was facing uncertainty. However, a week later, the decision was reversed, allowing Immortal to release as planned.

== Reception ==
=== Critical response ===
Latha Srinivasan for NDTV rated the film 2.5/5, feeling the writing and screenplay were not strong and wrote, "The screenplay, which meanders in parts, could have delved deeper into the mythological aspect for one and the emotional stakes could have been stronger as well." Akshay Kumar for Cinema Express also gave the same rating and wrote, "Lack of fake sophistication and straightforward storytelling make Immortal likeable. The film also doesn't get its hands too dirty with too many plot points." M Suganth for The Times of India rated the film only 2/5 stars and wrote, "Immortal plays out like a textbook of horror film templates with the blandest execution."

=== Box-office ===
On its opening day Immortal grossed approximately ₹1.10 million (US$11,000). In the first week it grossed ₹5.23 million (US$54,000).
