= Kayadu Lohar =

Indian actress and model

- Kayadu Lohar at an interview
- Born: Kayadu Lohar; 11 April 2000 (age 26); Tezpur, Assam, India
- Occupations: Actress; model
- Years active: 2021–present

Kayadu Lohar (born 11 April 2000) is an Indian actress and model who predominantly appears in Malayalam and Tamil films. She made her debut with the Kannada film Mugilpete (2021). Lohar had her breakthrough with Dragon (2025).

== Early life ==
Kayadu Lohar hails from Tezpur, Assam, and has been living in Pune, Maharashtra. She is the daughter of Mohanlal Lohar and Sunita. She was educated at St. Francis De Sales School in Pune. Later, she studied at Don Bosco College in Pune and then did her Bachelor's degree in Commerce from Savitribai Phule Pune University.

== Career ==
Lohar started her career with a jewellery pageant contest and later won the Times of India's Everyuth Fresh Face Season 12. Lohar made her acting debut in the 2021 Kannada film Mugilpete when she was participating in Times Fresh Face Competition. Her first Malayalam film Pathonpatham Noottandu was released in September 2022, Alluri, her first Telugu film in 2022, I Prem U, her first Marathi film in 2023.

Lohar had her career breakthrough in 2025 with her Tamil debut, Dragon where she played a businessman's daughter opposite Pradeep Ranganathan. Her performance earned her recognition. Avinash Ramachandran of The Indian Express stated, "Kayadu turn up a wonderful performance even if her character is relegated to being increasingly one-note." It was a commercial success, and emerged as the fourth higgest grossing Tamil film of the year.

Lohar had six films releases in 2026: Telugu films Funky opposite Vishwak Sen, and The Paradise opposite Nani, Malayalam films Pallichattambi opposite Tovino Thomas, and I'm Game opposite Dulquer Salmaan, and Tamil films Idhayam Murali opposite Atharvaa, and Immortal opposite G. V. Prakash Kumar. Among these, Idhayam Murali and The Paradise emerged as modest commercial success.

== Filmography ==
Key
†	Denotes films that have not yet been released

=== Films ===
Year	Title	Role	Language	Notes	Ref.
2021	Mugilpete	Apoorva	Kannada	Debut film	
2022	Pathonpatham Noottandu	Nangeli	Malayalam		
2022	Alluri	Sandhya	Telugu		
2023	I Prem U	Veena	Marathi		
2025	Oru Jaathi Jaathakam	Payal	Malayalam		
2025	Dragon	Pallavi Parasuram	Tamil		
2026	Funky	Chitra	Telugu		
2026	Pallichattambi	K. P. A. C. Rebecca	Malayalam		
2026	Idhayam Murali	Amudha	Tamil		
2026	I'm Game	Isha	Malayalam		
2026	Immortal	Sindhu	Tamil		
2026	The Paradise	Subbalakshmi "Subbu"	Telugu		
2027	Thaaram †	TBA	Malayalam	Filming	
2027	Manjanaththi †	TBA	Tamil	Filming	
2027	Suriya 48 †	TBA	Tamil	Filming	

=== Music videos ===
Year	Song	Language	Singer(s)	Ref.
2026	"Pavazha Malli"	Tamil	Sai Abhyankkar, Shruti Haasan	

== Awards and nominations ==
Year	Award	Category	Work	Result	Ref.
2026	South Indian International Movie Awards	Best Female Debut – Tamil	Dragon	Won	
