= Channar =

Channar may refer to:

- Channar (surname)
- Channar (Nadar Caste)
- Channar mine, an iron ore mine in Australia
