= Thiyyar Regiment =

British military class

Thiyyar Regiment തീയ്യർ പട്ടാളം
- Presidency of Madras Presidency
- unknown–1950
- Flag

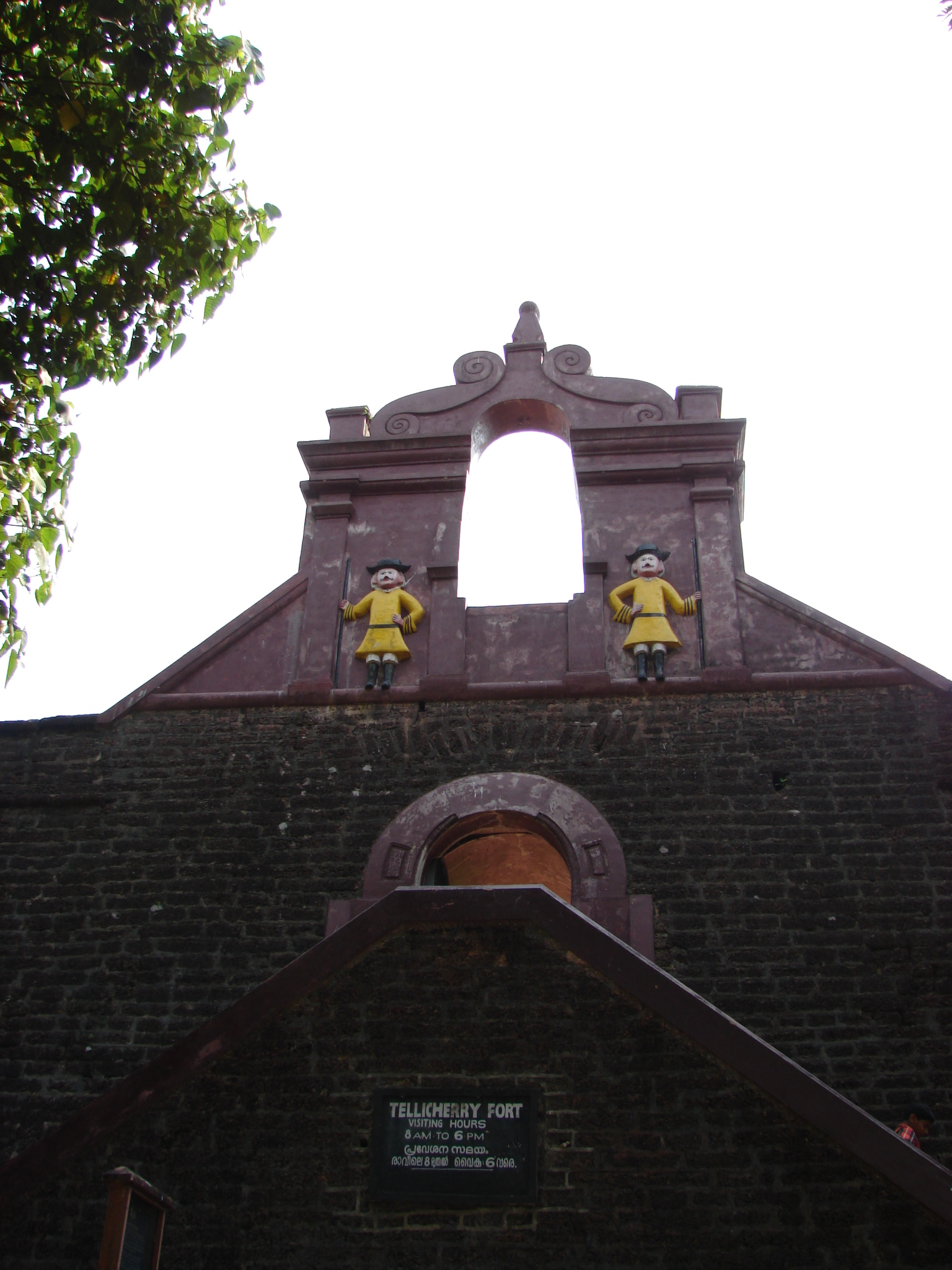
- Thalassery Kotta
- Historical era: New Imperialism
  - The Agency of Fort St George at Madraspatnam becomes the Madras Presidency: unknown
  - Republic of India: 29 April 1950
Preceded by	Succeeded by
History of Chennai	Madras State

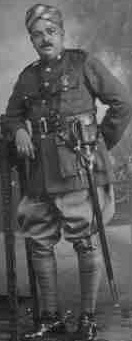
Army man of Thiyya Regiment

The Thiyyar Regiment was a military class created by British Empire that provided thousands of Thiyyar community members from North Malabar (mostly in Kannur district) for the British Indian Army. The Regiment was based in Thalassery, chosen because it was a strategic center in Malabar. There were many Thiyyar people who held the posts of subedar and jemendhar in the local militia under the East India Company. Jemadhar were considered the high and responsible post. The first person to occupy this highest rank and post in British Indian army under the Thiyya regimen was Ayyathan Chandhoman Jemadhar. He was a strong personality who had led many wars while in the regiment who got promoted and retired as the Subedar Major. He was the great-granduncle to Dr.Ayyathan Gopalan a renowned renaissance leader and social reformer of Kerala. There were lesser known Thiyya regiments and Thiyyar Pattalam formed by the French and British governments in Mahe and Thalassery. The British deployed the unit in various military operations.

The letter of the government of Madras in October (1932) throws light on the fact about the Thiyyar regiment in malabar early.

== Role of Malabar ==
Nowhere in the Malabar region is an army of only nairs to be seen. In the Thiyya division itself, various police forces and the military sector were under the French forces. This necessitated the maintenance of a fairly strong force at Thalassery. Personnel were recruited from the local Tiveys ( Tiyyas ) as regular force to support the European regiment. 51 Native irregulars were also maintained. on the occasions of war.

It is seen mentioned in some documents that this battalion played a major role in Pazhassi Raja British East India Company War. it is stated that, 1802. A European regiment and three battalions of native infantry were to be stationed at Canara in order to withdraw the British troops from Goa; If they remain at Goa, one regiment and two battalions will suffice for service in Canara. One regiment and one battalion were to be stationed at Mangalore for detachments in the southern parts of the province; A battalion in Kundapur. A battalion was to be stationed at Seedasighur in case the British troops were withdrawn from Goa. One regiment of Europeans, five battalions of native infantry, and three companies of artillery were to be in the province of Malabar, except Wayanad, provided for in the supply to Mysore.

1. "Seringapatam, 11th March, 1802. a letter from General Stuart, in which he informs me that orders have been received to discharge from the service all the Nair, Tier, and Moplah sebundies in Malabar, and all local and volunteer corps in other parts, and to reduce the numbers of the regular battalions to the peace establish ment of t of 1796, that is to say, to 900 each battalion. The number of battalions is not to be altered at present . In consequence of this information, I write this day to Colonel Boles to desire that he will make the necessary arrange ments for disbanding the three corps of sebundies . The General has desired that I would suggest to you the propriety of taking into the service, as revenue or police peons, as many of these discharged sebundies as you may be willing to entertain in those capacities, rather than to let loose upon Mala bar at once so large a body of men accustomed to arms . You will be the best judge how far you can attend to this suggestion . If you can take into the service any number of these people, I think the peace of the country will be benefited . The General says that he intends to propose to government that waste land may be given to the discharged sebundies and sepoys in the different parts of the country.

== Modern history ==
Eliza Draper, who was born in British India and married to a British soldier, mentions Thiyyas as "a community bearing arms, though it was mainly the Nairs who had the privilege of carrying arms with them, according to Hindu social customs. But there were a number of Thiyya families known for martial skills and many families were known as gurukkals with Kalaripayattu traditions in the northern parts of Malabar. One of the prominent aristocratic family at Malabar was Ayyathan family who were the small time rulers of Randuthara (now Dharmadom) and a great navigators, warrior clan, scholars and aryavaidya physicians.One of the renowned aryavaidya scholar and physician was Ayyathan Kannan Vaidyar the great grandfather of Dr.Ayyathan Gopalan he was well versed in poison therapy, and was also a well known Sanskrit scholar and Gurukkal. "

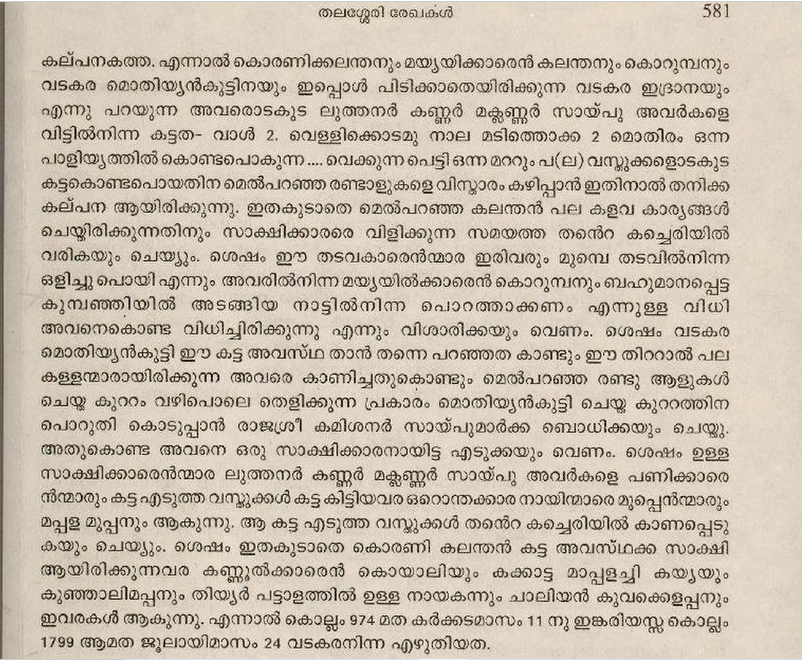
'തലശ്ശേരി രേഖകൾ (Thalassery Manuscripts)' on Thiyyar Pattalam(Thiyyar Army) of 1799 formed by British, a predecessor of Thiyyar regiment

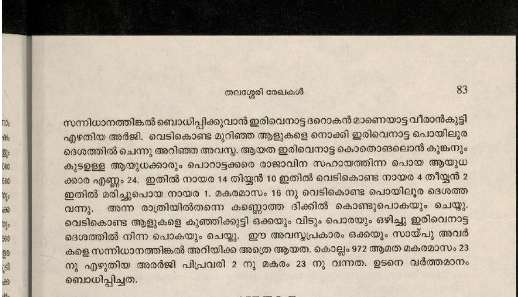
Thiyyar in Kottayam Raja Army in 1792, half of the Army consisted of Thiyyar warriors, which motivated British to form a separate regiment later.

== See also ==
- Cherayi Panikkar
