= Eruvessi =

- village
- Location in Kerala, India Eruvessi (India)
- Coordinates: 12°3′0″N 75°33′0″E
- Country: India
- State: Kerala
- District: Kannur

Government
  - Type: Panchayati raj (India)
  - Body: Eruvessy Grama Panchayat

Area
  - Total: 49.08 km^{2} (18.95 sq mi)

Population (2011)
  - Total: 19,216
  - Density: 391.5/km^{2} (1,014/sq mi)

Languages
  - Official: Malayalam, English
- Time zone: UTC+5:30 (IST)
- PIN: 670632
- ISO 3166 code: IN-KL
- Vehicle registration: KL-59
- Nearest city: Chemperi, Payyavoor.
- Lok Sabha constituency: Kannur
- Climate: Tropical monsoon (Köppen)
- Avg. summer temperature: 35 °C (95 °F)
- Avg. winter temperature: 20 °C (68 °F)

Eruvessi is a village in Irikkur Block Panchayat, Taliparamba Taluk, Kannur district in Kerala, India, around 50 kilometers from Kannur. It was ruled by Mannanar dynasty of Muthedath Aramana and Elayadath Aramana.

== Demographics ==
As of 2011 Census, Eruvessi village had a population of 19,216, which comprises 9,519 males and 9,697 females. Eruvessy village spreads over an area of 49.08 km2 (18.95 sq mi) with 5,395 families residing in it. The sex ratio of Eruvessy was 1,019 lower than the state average of 1,084. The population of children in the age group 0-6 was 1,987 (10.3%), with 1,006 boys and 981 girls. Eruvessy had an overall literacy rate of 95.6%, higher than the state average of 94%. The male literacy rate stands at 97%, and the female literacy rate was 94.2%.

== Transportation ==
The national highway passes through Taliparamba town. Mangalore and Mumbai can be accessed on the northern side and Cochin and Thiruvananthapuram can be accessed on the southern side. The road to the east connects to Mysore and Bangalore. The nearest railway station is Kannur on Mangalore-Palakkad line. There is an airport at Kannur.

== Geography ==
Eruvessi is a hilly village on the eastern side of Kannur district. The terrain is undulating in nature and the extreme eastern side has forests bordering Karnataka state.
