= Kuroolli Chekon =

Warrior

Kurooli Chekon, known as Kadathanadan Simham, was a Thiyya warrior who lived in the 19th century in Vadakara (1869–1913), North Malabar, who fought against the oppression by the British Government and Kadathanad Raja. Vaniyakuruvalli Kunji Chekavar, also known as Kurooli Chekon, was a fierce warrior and farmer who fought valiantly against the barbaric culture, cronyism and cruelty of the colonized region of Vadathanara in Kozhikode district about 100 years ago. Apart from caste and religion, Kuruli Chekon, a close friend and adored man of the Thiyyas, Mappilas, Kurichyas, poor Nairs and all other peoples, became the target of the King of Kadathanad and the noble chiefs.

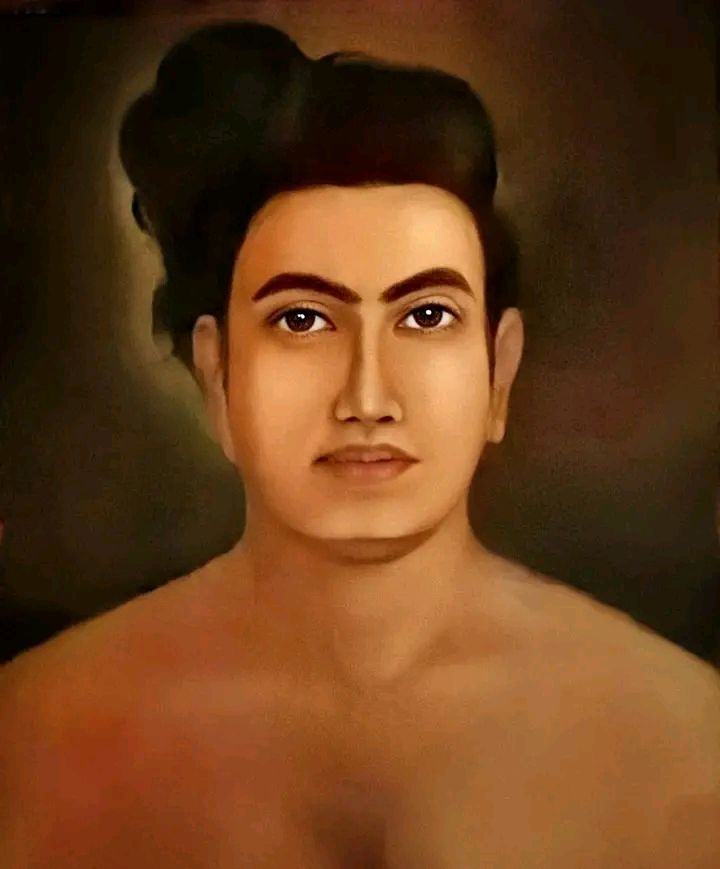
Kurooli Chekon painting

== History ==
An attempt was later made by the British police and the courts to fabricate a case against Chekon after the serial killers sent by Madambi to assassinate him failed repeatedly. Chekon, who had faith in the British court, cooperated with the case and firmly believed that the court would be convinced of the truth and he would be acquitted because it was a false case. However, as soon as the verdict was read out in court, Chekon managed to escape, as the cunning king and his accomplices had produced a number of false witnesses against Chekon. It was during this time of hiding that Chekon grew into a popular hero. Chekon grew in the hearts of the people as a divine character, who was the last word for resolving disputes in the country and an invincible force to save those who were suffering and persecuted. History has it that after the magistrate sentenced Chekon to life imprisonment, he wanted to meet Chekon in person and became a Sarasana and talkative Tamil Brahmin cloth seller. With just a few months to go before Chekon's sentence expires, the governor killed his best friend, Kurichi, with a treacherous gun and a poisoned arrow. The story of this legendary hero, who was obsessed with golden interests, has been written and published by Sri Vishnu Mangalam Kumar, a journalist from Bangalore with the sincerity of a truth seeker. Kuruli Chekon - Kairali Books in Kannur has released this book as an illustrated book titled Kadathanadan Simham. Collected oral folk song about Kuruli Chekon describing the popular exile and end of Chekon among the Kurichis.
