= Chithrakaran Murali =

Indian artist

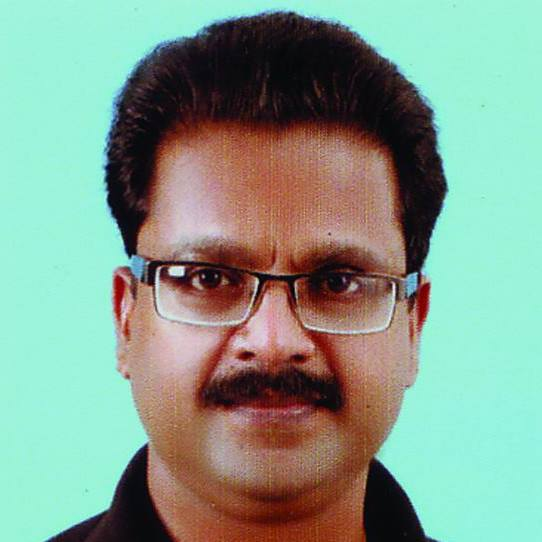

Chithrakaran Murali (Murali T) is an artist from Kerala, India. One of his works is based on fictional folklore Nangeli. The work of Murali has been recognised by news media including the BBC.

A case has been registered against the blog Aathmagathangal ’ by Murali over alleged obscene content in the post. Murali moved an anticipatory bail application before the Kannur Town Police. The state cyber cell has forwarded the complaint to the police for further investigation. The blog debates the Brahminical attitudes of Kerala society against the backdrop of media's depictions of gods and goddesses. The blog tries to show caste and race deep within the Malayali psyche through the way people address issues. Some bloggers have come up in open supporting the freedom of expression in blogdom.
