= Nangeli =

Legendary woman

The fictional story of Nangeli depicts an Ezhava woman to have lived in the early 19th century in Cherthala in the erstwhile princely state of Travancore in India, and supposedly cut off her breasts in an effort to protest against a tax on breast.

Viewed as a village tale, it is not mentioned in any of the historical records. It gained much attention since the publication of a 2016 BBC article on this subject.

== Legend ==
According to the legend, Nangeli and her husband Chirukandan belonged to the Ezhava caste and were toddy tappers, and in the early years of the 19th century, the pravathiyar (village officer) of Travancore came to Nangeli's home to survey her breasts and collect the breast tax. Nangeli revolted against the harassment; chopping off her breasts and presenting them to him in a plantain leaf. She died soon from loss of blood and her husband Chirukandan, seeing her mutilated body was overcome by grief and jumped into her funeral pyre. The couple was childless.

After her death, the breast tax system was supposedly annulled in Travancore, soon afterwards and the place she lived had come to be known as Mulachiparambu (meaning land of the breasted woman) is located in Cherthala, Kerala.

== Historicity ==
The tale is not recognised in any of India's historical accounts.

Popular historian Manu S. Pillai claims that both men and women had poll tax called talakkaram and mulakkaram, respectively, and that, contrary to its name, "breast tax" is a misnomer and had nothing to do with breasts. He claims that the "Mulakkaram" was a term to distinguish female taxpayers from males, and that "the tax was not based on the size of the breast or its attractiveness, as Nangeli's storytellers will claim, but was one standard rate charged from women". According to him, covering breasts was not a fashion in Kerala at that time and Victorian standards of morality penetrated into the society decades later via British colonialists, which led to subsequent class-struggles for the right of the lower caste to wear upper cloth. He believes Nangeli might have protested against an oppressive tax regime that was imposed upon all lower castes, "when Nangeli stood up, squeezed to the extremes of poverty by a regressive tax system, it was a statement made in great anguish about the injustice of the social order itself".

== In popular culture ==
Nangeli was featured as a character in the 2022 period film Pathonpatham Noottandu, directed by Vinayan.

== See also ==
- Kannagi – Legendary Tamil woman
- Chithrakaran Murali – Artist who has produced works featuring Nangeli
- Channar revolt – Revolt of women in Travancore protesting upper-body clothing restrictions
