= Breast tax =

Tax imposed on women by the Kingdom of Tranvancore

Mulakkaram, literally translated as breast tax, was a head tax imposed on women belonging to Nadar, Ezhava and other lower caste communities by the erstwhile Kingdom of Tranvancore (in present-day Kerala state of India), and was not applicable to upper caste women of Travancore. (Note: Sabin Iqbal (13 Aug 2020), The Legend of Nangeli, Open) (Note: Headtax: Krishna Iyer 1937: "The petty Raja used to give a silver-headed cane to the principal headman, who was then called 'Perumban' or 'caneman'. The head money was popularly known as 'thalakaram' in the case of males and 'mulakaram' in the case of females."; Nair 1986, p. 45: "The Pooja Raja in Travancore made the Malarayans pay money at the rate of one anna, two pies (8 pies) a head monthly as soon as they were able to work, and a similar sum of presence money besides certain quotas of fruits and vegetables and feudal service [....] The head money was called Thalakaram in the case of males and Mulakaram (breast money) in the case of females."; Pillai 2019: "Nangeli too was recast. When Nangeli offered her breasts on a plantain leaf to the rajah's men, she demanded not the right to cover her breasts, for she would not have cared about this 'right' that meant nothing in her day. Indeed, the mulakkaram had little to do with breasts other than the tenuous connection of nomenclature. It was a poll tax charged from low-caste communities, as well as other minorities. Capitation due from men was the talakkaram—head tax—and to distinguish female payees in a household, their tax was the mulakkaram—breast tax. The tax was not based on the size of the breast or its attractiveness, as Nangeli's storytellers will claim, but was one standard rate charged from women as a certainly oppressive but very general tax" (Pillai (2019)).; Pillai, as quoted by Sabin Iqbal (13 August 2020): "'The Nangeli story, as it is related popularly today, is somewhat misunderstood. There was a poll-tax chargeable on avarnas by the state or the feudal lord, depending on where in Kerala we are speaking of, and this, for men, was called talakkaram, and for women, mulakkaram. Sometimes, it was simply called talappanam for everyone. But beyond nomenclature, it had no connection to the breasts, or to covering the breasts,' says Pillai. 'She was not fighting for the right to cover herself, "protect her modesty", or anything like that. She was resisting an oppressive, caste-based tax. The battle is about caste, not about virtue or the "right" to cover up. That was not a "right" in local eyes at all till the late 19th and early 20th centuries,' he adds (Sabin Iqbal (13 Aug, 2020)).) The term "breast tax" was used to denote the gender of the person and not breasts per se. (Note: Swati Gautam (14.01.21), The breast tax that wasn't, The Telegraph Online)

According to subaltern beliefs, the breast tax was imposed on lower-caste women if they covered their breasts. (Note: Tax to cover the breasts: Divya Arya, BBC (2016): "Women from lower castes were not allowed to cover their breasts, and were taxed heavily if they did so."; Allen 2018: "By the start of the 19th century the ordinary people of Travancore were being required to pay as many as 100 petty taxes, ranging from head tax, hut tax, marriage tax and taxes on the tools of one's trade to taxes on the family cow, goat or dog, wearing jewellery, staging festivals, growing moustaches, and above all what became known as the breast tax, mulakkaram, by which the women of lower social groups had to expose their breasts or pay a tax. The Brahmins, naturally, paid no tax at all."; Jain 2021: "In the early nineteenth century, Travancore's State's council of 'upper' caste Nair's imposed a 'breast tax', or mulakkaram, that fined Nadar (formerly Shanar) men and women who covered their upper bodies like the 'higher' castes.") This belief has been questioned, (Note: Manu Pillai (18 February 2017), The woman who cut off her breasts, The Hindu) as lower-caste women were not allowed to wear upper garments in public at all until 1859. (Note: Not allowed to wear upper cloth: Kattackal 1990, p. 144: "In South India, until the 19th century, the 'low caste' men had to pay the 'head tax', and the 'low caste' women had to pay a 'breast tax' ('tala-karam' and 'mula-karam') to the government treasury. The still more shameful truth is that these women were not allowed to wear upper garments in public."; Pillai, as quoted by Gautam (2021): "... even royal women, including queens, did not cover their breasts in those days. 'Not until the 1860s,' says Manu Pillai, historian and author. What the upper castes carried instead was a shoulder cloth denoting their exalted stature.") (Note: During the time of Travancore, uncovering one's breasts was revered as a symbolic token of homage from the lower castes towards the upper castes. A state law prevented this covering, which served to demarcate the caste hierarchy in a prominent manner, and often served as the core locus of spontaneous rebellions by lower castes (Cohn 1996, p. 140, Hardgrave 1969, p. 55–70). Lower-caste women who covered their chest broke the caste regulations, and could be fined by a Nair council (Jain 2021). Higher-caste women, including Nair women, covered both shoulders and parts of the chest with a shawl (ICF-team (2019), Amrith Lal (2018)). With the spread of Christianity in the 19th century, the Christian converts among the Nadar women started covering their upper body with long cloths, and gradually the Hindu Nadar women also started to wear the Nair breast cloth (Hardgrave 1969, p. 59–62, Hardgrave 1968, Amrith Lal (2018)) which led to violence between the upper caste and lower castes (NIE (2009)). From 1813 to 1859, several laws were enacted and repealed by Travancore regarding the upper cloth issue (Cohn 1996, p. 140, Ponnumuthan 1996, p. 109). Several waves of violence continued for four decades (NIE (2009)). In 1859, under pressure from the Madras governor, the king issued a decree giving all Nadar women the right to cover their breasts (Cohn 1996, p. 141, Ross 2008, p. 78, Jones 1989, p. 159) though they were still not allowed to follow the style of the higher-class women (Ponnumuthan 1996, p. 110, Cohn 1996, pp. 141–142, Kertzer 1988, p. 113).)

== Head tax ==
The "breast tax" (mulakkaram or mula-karam in Malayalam) was a head tax imposed on the Nadars, Ezhavars and lower caste communities by the Kingdom of Tranvancore (in present-day Kerala state of India). In 19th century Kingdom of Travancore, all persons from lower castes were expected to pay poll tax when they start to work around the age of fourteen. (Note: Age fourteen: Manilal 2012, pp. 3–4: "One such infamous law that was in force in Travancore until as late as the first quarter of the 20th century was known as Mulakkaram, i.e., the law of breast tax. According to this law the avarna women, were to pay tax to the government for their breasts from the very time of their girlhood, when they start developing breasts.") Poll tax paid by men were called talakkaram (lit. 'head tax') or meeshakkaram (lit. 'moustache tax'); and the tax paid by women was called mulakkaram (lit. 'breast tax').

== 'Breast-cover tax' ==
The "breast tax" caught wider attention in 2016, when BBC reporter Divya Arya reported on a series of paintings by artist Murali T on the legend of Nangeli. The village legend of Nangeli is about a woman who lived in the early 19th century in Cherthala in the state of Travancore, and supposedly cut off her breasts in an effort to protest against the caste-based "breast tax." According to the legend, she cut off her breasts and presented them to the tax collector in a plantain leaf, then died of blood loss.

According to local beliefs, the "breast tax" was imposed on lower-caste women if they covered their breasts in public, to disencourage them from doing so.

These beliefs have been questioned, as lower-caste women were not allowed to wear upper garments in public at all until 1859, after the Channar revolt. Popular historian Manu Pillai treats the concept of "breast tax" to be a misnomer which "had nothing to do with breasts" and notes that covering the breasts was not the norm in Kerala's matrilineal society during Nangeli's life span. Victorian standards of morality penetrated into the society decades later under British colonial influence, which led to subsequent caste struggles for the right to wear upper-body clothing. He believes Nangeli to have protested against an oppressive tax regime that was imposed upon all lower castes, which got appropriated with the passage of time, in pursuit of a different patriarchal fight for the preservation of female dignity. In Jain's account, the "breast tax" is presented as a fine imposed by "Travancore's State's council of "upper" caste Nair's" to maintain caste boundaries. (Note: Jain 2021: "In the early nineteenth century, Travancore's State's council of 'upper' caste Nair's imposed a 'breast tax', or mulakkaram, that fined Nadar (formerly Shanar) men and women who covered their upper bodies like the 'higher' castes ..." Compare Kent 2004, pp. 207–211: "Rulers in Travancore had, in fact, previously bestowed on select members of the elite class of Shanars (the Nadars proper) the privilege of wearing the breast cloth [...] [i]n Travancore, a council of 'Sudra' (probably Nayar) leaders called the Pidagaikarars was responsible for enforcing [caste rules], as well as for adjudicating disputes that arose over the transgression of caste rules. Each year villages would send two or three delegates to an annual meeting of the body in Sucindram. This council would discuss whether individuals of their own and other castes 'had adopted the costume, food, speech (provincialism or brogue) and general habits of the other class', and would mete out sanctions to transgressors.")

== Sources ==
=== Printed sources ===
- Allen, Charles (2017). Coromandel: A personal history of South India. London: Little, Brown. ISBN 9781408705391. OCLC 1012741451.
- Allen, Charles (7 August 2018). "Who Owns India's History? A Critique of Shashi Tharoor's Inglorious Empire". Asian Affairs. 49 (3): 355–369. doi:10.1080/03068374.2018.1487685. S2CID 158949586.
- Cohn, Bernard S. (1996), Colonialism and Its Forms of Knowledge, Princeton University Press, ISBN 9780691000435
- Hardgrave, Robert L. Jr. (1968). "The Breast-Cloth Controversy: Caste Consciousness and Social Change in Southern Travancore". The Indian Economic & Social History Review. 5 (2): 171–187. doi:10.1177/001946466800500205. S2CID 143287605.
- Hardgrave, Robert L. (1969). The Nadars of Tamilnad. University of California Press. OCLC 12064.
- Jain, Kajri (March 2021). Gods in the Time of Democracy. Duke University Press.
- Jones, Kenneth W. (1989), Socio-Religious Reform Movements in British India, Cambridge University Press, ISBN 0-521-24986-4
- Kattackal, Jacob (1990). Comparative Religion. Oriental Institute of Religious Studies.
- Kent, Eliza F. (2004), Converting Women: Gender and Protestant Christianity in Colonial South India, Oxford University Press
- Kertzer, David I. (1988), Ritual, Politics, and Power, Yale University Press
- Krishna Iyer, L.A. (1937). Travancore Tribes And Castes Vol. 1. Thiruvananthapuram: Superintendent, Government Pres.
- Manilal, K.S. (15 November 2012). "Sikhism in Kerala: Forgotten Chapter in the Social History of the State". Samagra. 8. ISSN 0973-3906.
- Nair, Adoor K. K. Ramachandran (1986). Slavery in Kerala. Mittal Publications.
- Pillai, Manu S. (2019). "The woman with no breasts". The Courtesan, the Mahatma and the Italian Brahmin: Tales from Indian History. Chennai: Westland Publications. ISBN 9789388689786.
- Ponnumuthan, Selvister (1996), The Spirituality of Basic Ecclesial Communities in the Socio-religious Context of Trivandrum/Kerala, India, Universita Gregoriana
- Ross, Robert (2008), Clothing: A Global History, Polity
