= Idhayam Murali =

2026 Indian film by Aakash Baskaran

- Theatrical release poster
- Directed by: Aakash Baskaran
- Screenplay by: Aakash Baskaran; S. Ramana Girivasan
- Dialogue by: Dravid Selvam
- Story by: Aakash Baskaran
- Produced by: Aakash Baskaran
- Starring: Atharvaa; Preity Mukhundhan; Kayadu Lohar
- Cinematography: Manoj Paramahamsa; CH Sai
- Edited by: Pradeep E. Ragav
- Music by: Thaman S
- Production company: Dawn Pictures
- Distributed by: see below
- Release date: 10 July 2026
- Running time: 164 minutes
- Country: India
- Language: Tamil
- Box office: ₹38 crore

Idhayam Murali (lit. 'Heart Murali') is a 2026 Indian Tamil-language coming-of-age romantic drama film directed, co-written and produced by debutant Aakash Baskaran under Dawn Pictures. The film stars Atharvaa in titular role alongside Preity Mukhundhan, Kayadu Lohar, Natty Subramaniam, with Fahadh Faasil in an extended cameo appearance. The film marked Thaman's first film appearance in 22 years. The film was titled in honour of Atharvaa's father Murali who had acted in the film Idhayam (1991).

The film was officially announced in February 2025 and principal photography commenced in May. The film has music composed by Thaman S, cinematography handled by Manoj Paramahamsa and CH Sai and editing by Pradeep E. Ragav.

The film released in theatres on 10 July 2026 and received highly positive reviews from critics praising the cast performances and production values. The film performed well at the box office.

== Plot ==
The film opens on the eve of a wedding, as Idhaya and his friends rush from New York City to India. During the flight, Idhaya accidentally switches phones with a stranger and begins recounting his life story with him. From childhood through adulthood, Idhaya repeatedly falls in love but fails to confess his feelings. His first crush is his teacher Geetha, followed by Samantha, a girl from his school years whose identical twin Samyuktha leaves him unsure of whom he truly loves. Years later, he falls for a doctor, Amudha, but once again lacks the courage to tell her before she moves away.

In 2019, he reunites with Samantha, and old feelings return, but he misses another chance to confess his love when he fails to reach her flight. In 2024, after learning from Amudha that she once loved him too, Idhaya realizes how often his hesitation has cost him happiness. During a bachelor trip to New York, he reconnects with Samantha, but lies about being single; when she discovers the truth, she angrily leaves before he can explain.

Back in India, Idhaya arrives at the wedding hall and begins having doubts about marrying Adhithi. He asks his uncle to stop the wedding so he can pursue a life with Samantha, but his uncle refuses. Idhaya's friends attempt to intervene, only for the plan to fail until the mysterious stranger from the flight arrives with someone who appears to be Samantha. The stranger convinces Idhaya's uncle to stop the wedding, just as Idhaya is about to marry Adhithi. However, a comic twist reveals that the woman brought to the wedding was actually Samyuktha, not Samantha.

Months later, Samantha, now aboard a spacecraft, tells Idhaya that if he truly wants to marry her, he must finally look her in the eye and confess his love. As Idhaya struggles to find the courage, she warns that their call will end in 40 seconds. The film ends humorously with the call cutting off before Idhaya can finally say that he loves her.

== Cast ==
- Atharvaa as Idhaya
  - Keshav as young Idhaya
- Fahadh Faasil as Surya (extended cameo appearance)
- Preity Mukhundhan in a dual role as:
  - Samantha "Sam"
  - Samyuktha
- Kayadu Lohar as Amudha (voice dubbed by Chinmayi)
- Natty Subramaniam as Thanga, Idhaya's uncle
- Thaman S as Sachin
  - Ruthvik Sai as young Sachin
- Rakshan as Prabhu
  - Niirav as young Prabhu
- Dravid Selvam as Dravid
  - M Prithviraj as young Dravid
- Sudhakar as Juju
- Jonita Gandhi as Geetha, Surya's wife and Idhaya's English teacher
- Niharika NM as Lara "Lado" Dominic
- Angeline B as Priya, Prabhu's wife
- Yashashree Rao as Catherine, Samantha and Samyuktha's friend
- Ramki as Amudha's father
- Chinni Jayanth as Chinni
- Saravana Subbiah as minister Parandhaman
- Babloo Prithiveeraj as minister Parandhaman's henchmen
- FEFSI Vijayan as a tennis coach
- Kaali Venkat as an auto driver
- Lollu Sabha Maaran as a bus driver
- Madhankumar Dhakshinamoorthy as tuition master Rajangam
- Bagavathi Perumal as Idhaya's school teacher
- Aadukalam Naren as Adhithi's father
- Adithya Kathir as Esakki, Samantha's uncle
- John Mahendran as chief minister
- Bharathi Kannan as Adithi's uncle
- Thangadurai as a cricket commentator
- Jayakumar as Samantha and Samyuktha's father
- Deepa Mukhundhan as Samantha and Samyuktha's mother
- Nandhitha as Adithi's mother
- Padam Kumar as Sachin's father
- Rajalakshmi as Sachin's mother
- Monisha Ravishankar as Idhaya's friend
- Janani Ashok Kumar as a doctor
- Soundarya Saravanan as a nurse
- Muruganandam as a police inspector
- Anandhi Ajay as Rajangam's wife
- Sameera as an astronaut

Cameo appearances

- Malavika Mohanan as Adhithi
- Anju Kurian as Thulasi, Sachin's wife
- Raiza Wilson as a pregnant lady
- Bjorn Surrao as a disc jockey
- Madhampatty Rangaraj as himself
- Pradeep Ranganathan as auto driver

== Production ==
In late May 2024, it was reported that producer Aakash Baskaran would make his directorial debut with a project starring Atharvaa, Thaman S, and Mamitha Baiju. In December 2025, Atharvaa confirmed the project and stated that principal photography had already commenced with the shoot of a promotional teaser. The teaser was released on 13 February 2025, announcing the project officially. The film was named in honour of Atharvaa's father, Murali, who had starred in the 1991 film Idhayam. Atharvaa completed dubbing his lines in June 2026.

== Music ==
Idhayam Murali

Soundtrack album by Thaman S
- Released: 5 June 2026
- Recorded: May 2024
- Studios: Studio Uno Records, Chennai
- Genre: Feature film soundtrack
- Language: Tamil
- Label: Think Music
- Producer: Thaman S

Thaman S chronology
Lenin (2026)	Idhayam Murali (2026)	Korean Kanakaraju (2026)

Singles from Idhayam Murali
- 1. "Idhayaa" Released: 21 March 2025; 2. "Thangame Thangame" Released: 28 January 2026; 3. "Vaan Vaan" Released: 13 February 2026; 4. "Vaama Vaama" Released: 16 June 2026; 5. "Kattazhagi" Released: 1 July 2026

The soundtrack is composed by Thaman S, in his first collaboration with Atharvaa. The first track "Idhayaa" was released on 21 March 2025, and "Thangame Thangame" released on 28 January 2026. The third track "Vaan Vaan" was released on 13 February 2026, and "Vaama Vaama" released on 16 June 2026. The fifth single "Kattazhagi" was released on 1 July 2026, and the entire soundtrack album was released on 10 July 2026.

Track listing
No.	Title	Lyrics	Singer(s)	Length
1.	"Idhayaa"	Vivek	Vishal Mishra	2:10
2.	"Thangame Thangame"	Vivek	Dheeraj, Sahithi, Adviteeya, Prakruthi, Pranati, Rajini and Sruthi	5:03
3.	"Vaan Vaan"	Vivek	Mohit Chauhan	4:38
4.	"Vaama Vaama"	Adesh Krishna	Dhanush	4:23
5.	"Kattazhagi"	Vivek	Thaman S	4:07
6.	"Idhayaa Extended"	Vivek	Vishal Mishra	3:50
7.	"Idhayame Idhayame"	Vivek	Manojna	4:30
8.	"Vaan Vaan" (New York Edition)	Vivek	Thaman S	4:43
Total length:				33:23

== Release ==
=== Theatrical ===
The film was planned to be released in theatres on 10 July 2026. Director Sudha Kongara filed a case in the Madras High Court to stop the release as the film produces, Dawn Pictures, had not paid her the dues owed for the film Parasakthi (2026). However, the court allowed the film to be released and the film was released on 10 July.

=== Distribution ===
Idhayam Murali was distributed by Red Giant Movies in Tamil Nadu. Mythri Movie Makers acquired the film's theatrical rights for Andhra Pradesh and Telangana. The distribution rights were acquired by Bhavana Release and Future RunUp Films in Kerala. The Karnataka distribution rights were acquired by Swagath Enterprises.

Phars Film acquired the overseas theatrical rights. The overseas distribution rights in United Kingdom and Europe were acquired by Boleyn Cinema and Ahimsa Entertainment. The distribution rights in Sri Lanka were acquired by SAS Plaza. The Malaysia distribution rights were acquired by Malik Streams Corporation. The theatrical rights in the Canada were acquired by York Cinemas. The distribution rights in Australia, New Zealand and Singapore were acquired by Home Screen Entertainment. The distribution rights in United States were acquired by Prime Media.

=== Home Media ===
The post-theatrical digital streaming rights were acquired by Netflix.

== Reception ==
Bhuvanesh Chandar of The Hindu said that "While the film understands the feeling of unrequited love, it never builds the emotional depth needed to make those moments linger. Idhayam's Murali, a poet at heart, had a song do it for him, but Idhayam Murali needed more." Janani K. of the India Today rated the film 2.5/5 and remarked that "Manoj Paramahamsa's cinematography is one of Idhayam Murali's genuine pleasures. Idhayam Murali is fun when it doesn't take itself seriously. The moment it veers into its story, it exposes its problems rather than playing to its strengths."

Prashanth Vallavan of Cinema Express rated the film 3/5 and said wrote "If Idhayam (1991) was all about showing the pathos of an anxious yearner, Idhayam Murali is a rose-tinted fantasy. Idhayam Murali isn't perfect, but aren't fairytale love stories more about the “happily ever after” than the messy dragon-infested road they took to get there?" Latha Srinivasan of NDTV gave the film 3/5 and wrote that it is a "somewhat satisfying romance that thrives on nostalgia, delivering a breezy, feel-good watch even if it doesn't always strike a deep emotional chord".
