= Channar (surname) =

Channar, or Chandor was a surname used in Kerala until the early 20th century by reputed families of the Ezhava community. The same surname is also being used by Jatt clans.Channar families, along with the families with the surnames such as Panicker, Thandar and Vaidyar were similarly high status Ezhavas with caste privileges.
