= Pathonpatham Noottandu =

2022 Indian film

- Theatrical release poster
- Directed by: Vinayan
- Written by: Vinayan
- Produced by: Gokulam Gopalan
- Starring: Siju Wilson; Kayadu Lohar
- Narrated by: Mohanlal; Mammootty
- Cinematography: Shaji Kumar
- Edited by: Vivek Harshan
- Music by: Songs: M. Jayachandran; Background Score: Santhosh Narayanan
- Production company: Sree Gokulam Movies
- Distributed by: Sree Gokulam Movies; Dream Big Films
- Release date: 8 September 2022 (India)
- Running time: 158 minutes
- Country: India
- Language: Malayalam

Pathonpatham Noottandu (transl. Nineteenth century) is a 2022 Indian Malayalam-language period action film written and directed by Vinayan. Set in the 19th century Travancore, the story is based on the life of Arattupuzha Velayudha Panicker, a warrior who fought against social injustices suffered by the lower caste. The film stars Siju Wilson and Kayadu Lohar, with Anoop Menon, Chemban Vinod Jose, Sudev Nair, Vishnu Vinay, and Senthil Krishna in supporting roles. The original score was composed by Santhosh Narayanan (in his Malayalam debut) and songs by M. Jayachandran.

Pathonpatham Noottandu was released in theatres on 8 September 2022. The film won three Kerala State Film Awards.

== Plot ==
A young Arattupuzha Velayudha Panicker from Arattupuzha arrives at the English East India Company headquarters at Travancore to ask a lord for a permit to export cardamom. There he witnesses a brutal fight match between slaves conducted by British Raj officers along with some nobles and other guests. When the winner is coerced by the officers to kill the loser by bludgeoning, Chekavar interferes and saves him, but a fight breaks out. Chekavar manages to escape without getting shot.

The Maharaja of Travancore calls Velayudha Chekavar to the Durbar to enlist his help in finding and capturing Kayamkulam Kochunni, who stole sacred salagram ornaments from the Padmanabhaswamy Temple. The Naduvazhi ministers and governors dissuade the Maharaja from enlisting him with the task because Chekavar belonged to the Ezhava community, that was deemed as lower caste. Since Kochunni assaulted Paachupanikkar, the commander-in-chief of Travancore Army, and his assistants during their attempt to capture him, Maharaja announces a reward to whoever gives information about Kochunni. Meanwhile, Kochunni plans to recover the chest of ornaments he stole and hid underground near the palace during the prince's wedding celebration.

Chekavar builds a Shiva temple for the lower caste people, which gets him arrested on the order of the Diwan as it's forbidden for them to worship an idol. While in jail, the deputy commander-in-chief, Padaveedan Nambi, and the naduvazhi Panikkasseri Kaimal, plan to poison Chekavar to death. Inspector Kannan Kurup, the son of the former commander-in-chief, saves Chekavar. The queen issues an order to release Chekavar. She then meets him and asks his help to retrieve the stolen ornaments and capture Kochunni.

During the wedding evening, Kochunni arrives to retrieve the hidden chest. Kurup finds and catches him but lets him free in exchange for half the price of the ornaments. Kochunni and Kurup try to sell the chest to Looper, an Englishman who exports ivory and antiques to England and France. Chekavar arrives and defeats Kochunni and his team, and retrieves the chest while Kurup and Looper escape. After Kochunni gets jailed, Maharaja offers the reward of veera shringhala and 1008 gold coins, but his ministers advise him against giving it directly by the Mahraja conforming to untouchability law. Seeing this, Chekavar rejects the reward. To honour him, Maharaja confers Chekavar the title Panicker, thenceforth he is known as Arattupuzha Velayudha Panicker. Kurup meets Kochunni in jail and is offered stolen gold coins in return for killing Velayudha Panicker.

Meanwhile, atrocities towards the lower caste continued. Women who wore clothes that covered their ankles were beaten up with hot iron rods while those who wore nose rings or covered their breasts had these body parts chopped off by the lords. As a protest, Panicker proclaimed all women to cover their chests, wear long dothi and nose ring and perform the Poothan dance during the Perumpoothan Thullal, a dance ritual. He provides garments and nose rings to all women.

During the ritual, Panikkasseri Kaimal and Padaveedan Nambi interrupted with a team of police inspectors and started to beat up everyone. Panicker and Nangeli defended them. Nambi kills Panicker's grandfather, Perumal. In a fury, Panicker kills Nambi. Kurup and Kochunni's assistant, Bava, arrived and fired at Panicker, who followed them and caught Bava.

The next day in the durbar of the palace, Diwan and Kaimal request the king to take necessary action against Panicker for breaking the ritual rules and killing Nambi. Panicker comes before the king and declares that he is happy to have killed a traitor. When Bava is brought before the court, he confesses that Nambi and the naduvazhi Chandrupilla leaked information to them about Paachupanikkar coming to Kayamkulam to capture Kochunni, and were heavily rewarded for that. Bava is jailed while Chandrupilla is sentenced to death for treason. The king announces the trial will continue the next day and only then the final verdict will be made.

Panicker and his people leave for Cherthala after his grandfather's cremation. There, the idol installation at the temple takes place. Panicker plans to go to Ananthapuri. Kaimal and Raman Thambi buy off Kandappan, Panicker's close aide, to assassinate Panicker. Kandappan spikes the tender coconut drinks given to Panicker and all the others in the boat. Kaimal executes Bava with the help of the king's confidant, Rudran. As the drug takes effect, Kaimal and his team attack Panicker. He kills them all, but bleeds to death.

Later, Nangeli is tied and beaten up for covering up her chest in defiance of the breast tax. Her father Kelu, who came for her rescue, is also captured and beaten. To save her father's life, Nangeli seemingly agrees to remove her upper cloth and pay the tax, but instead chops off her own breasts and presents them before the governors, dying shortly after. Seeing her mutilated body, her lover Chirukkandan jumps into her funeral pyre.

The deaths of Panicker and Nangeli arouse fury and distress among the people. They attack the authorities and the landlords, and destroy shops and markets. To save Travancore from becoming a riotous land, the king abolishes the unjust taxes and grants women the right to cover their upper body.

== Cast ==
- Siju Wilson as Arattupuzha Velayudha Panicker, a wealthy trader and swordsman.
- Kayadu Lohar as Nangeli
- Anoop Menon as Maharaja of Travancore Ayilyam Thirunal Rama Varma
- Chemban Vinod Jose as Kayamkulam Kochunni
- Deepti Sati as Savithri Thampuratti
- Poonam Bajwa as the King's wife Mathruppillil Kalyanikutty Amma
- Renu Soundar as Neeli
- Senthil Krishna as Chirukandan
- Sudev Nair as Padaveedan Nambi, Second Chief army of Travancore, (voiceover by Shobi Thilakan)
- Suresh Krishna as Panikkasseri Parameswara Kaimal
- Vishnu Vinay as Kannan Kurup
- Tini Tom as Kunju Pillai
- Gokulam Gopalan as Pavunni Perumal
- Indrans as Kelu
- Manikandan R. Achari as Bava
- Ramu as Diwan
- Krishna as Diwan Peshkar Kalyana Krishnan
- Raghavan as Eeswaran Namboothiri
- Alencier Ley Lopez as Chandrakkaran Raman Thampi
- Sudheer Karamana as Pachupanicker, Chief of Travancore Army
- Varsha Viswanath as Janaki
- Madhuri Braganza as Katha
- Musthafa as Kandappan
- Jaffar Idukki as Thandalkkaran Keshunni
- Shivaji Guruvayoor as Cherthala Naduvazhi
- Sunil Sukhada as Chandru Pillai
- Niya as Velutha
- Master Adhil Raj as Kunju
- Spadikam George as Diwan Peshkar Nanu Pillai
- Naseer Sankranthi as Konthikuruppu, Eeswaran Namboothiri's Assistant
- Jayakumar Parameswaran Pillai as Appu Kurup
- Koottickal Jayachandran as Achupilla, the translator
- Chali Pala as Nagan Pilla, the jailor
- Vishnu Govindan as Chaathan
- V. K. Baiju as Komakuruppu
- Sruthi Roshan as Bhageerathi Thampuratti
- Krishna Prasad as Narayanan Namboothiri
- Munshi Renjith as Karunan
- Biju Ezhuppunna as Panjupilla police
- Adinadu Sasi as Kittu
- Poojappura Radhakrishnan as Thanupilla
- Sharan Puthumana as the Thirumeni

Narrators

- Mohanlal (opening)
- Mammootty (closing)

== Production ==
=== Development ===
Vinayan announced a film titled Pathonpatham Noottandu in March 2020 by making a casting call. He shared with the media that the story is set in the 1800s in the Kingdom of Travancore and features prominent historical figures, both men and women. Gokulam Gopalan of Sree Gokulam Films was named as the producer. In September, Vinayan revealed that the film would depict the lives of social reformer and swordsman Arattupuzha Velayudha Panicker, the infamous burglar Kayamkulam Kochunni, and the legendary woman Nangeli. He also mentioned that the production would require hundreds of actors and thousands of extras. Filming was scheduled to begin in December 2020, provided the COVID-19 situation improved, with hopes for an early 2021 release.

Vinayan initially pitched the project to actor Mohanlal, with whom he was planning to collaborate. However, Mohanlal declined the offer, suggesting that Vinayan explore a different subject for him.

=== Casting ===
Siju Wilson was cast in the lead role of Arattupuzha Velayudha Panicker, social reformer and swordsman. Kayadu Lohar was cast as Nangeli, who plays the female lead. Kayamkulam Kochunni is portrayed by Chemban Vinod Jose. Anoop Menon plays Maharaja of Travancore Ayilyam Thirunal Rama Varma.

=== Filming ===
Pooja function of the film was held in Kochi in January 2021, but the shooting was delayed due to the COVID-19 pandemic. The first schedule of the shooting began in Palakkad and it lasted for about three months. The shooting was temporarily stopped after that, as the state was undergoing the second wave of COVID-19 pandemic. On June 27, 2021, Vinayan said that the editing works has started as they have shot about 80 percent of the movie. He also added that the shooting will resume after the descent of the second wave. The second and the final schedule of the shooting began on November 3, 2021. By sharing the last shot of the movie, Vinayan and Siju Wilson announced that the shooting of the movie was wrapped up on November 23, 2021. The Dolby Atmos mixing of the film was completed on 1 July 2022. The film was censored with U/A certificate on 20 August 2022.

Shaji Kumar was the cinematographer of the film. Vivek Harshan did the editing work on the film. Pattanam Rasheed handled the make-up and the costumes were arranged by Dhanya Bhalakrishnan. Ajayan Challissery was the art director of the movie. Supreme Sundar, Rajashekar And Mafia Sasi handled the action choreography of the movie. V. C. Praveen and Biju Gopalan are the co-producers of the movie and Badusha is the production controller.

== Music ==
The music composition of the film started in June 2020. The songs featured in the film are composed by M. Jayachandran and Rafeeq Ahamed is the lyricist. Santhosh Narayanan has done the background score of the film. The film marks his debut as a composer in the Malayalam film industry.

Pathonpatham Noottandu (Original Motion Picture Soundtrack)
No.	Title	Singer(s)	Length
1.	"Pootham Varunnedi"	Sayanora Philip	2:23
2.	"Mayilpeeli Ilakunnu"	Mridula Warrier, K. S. Harisankar	4:44
3.	"Karumban Inningu Varumo"	Narayani Gopan, Nikhil Raj	3:54
4.	"Vaanam"	Unni Elyaraja, Sithara Krishnakumar	2:34
5.	"Parava Padunna"	Pandalam Balan	3:39

== Release ==
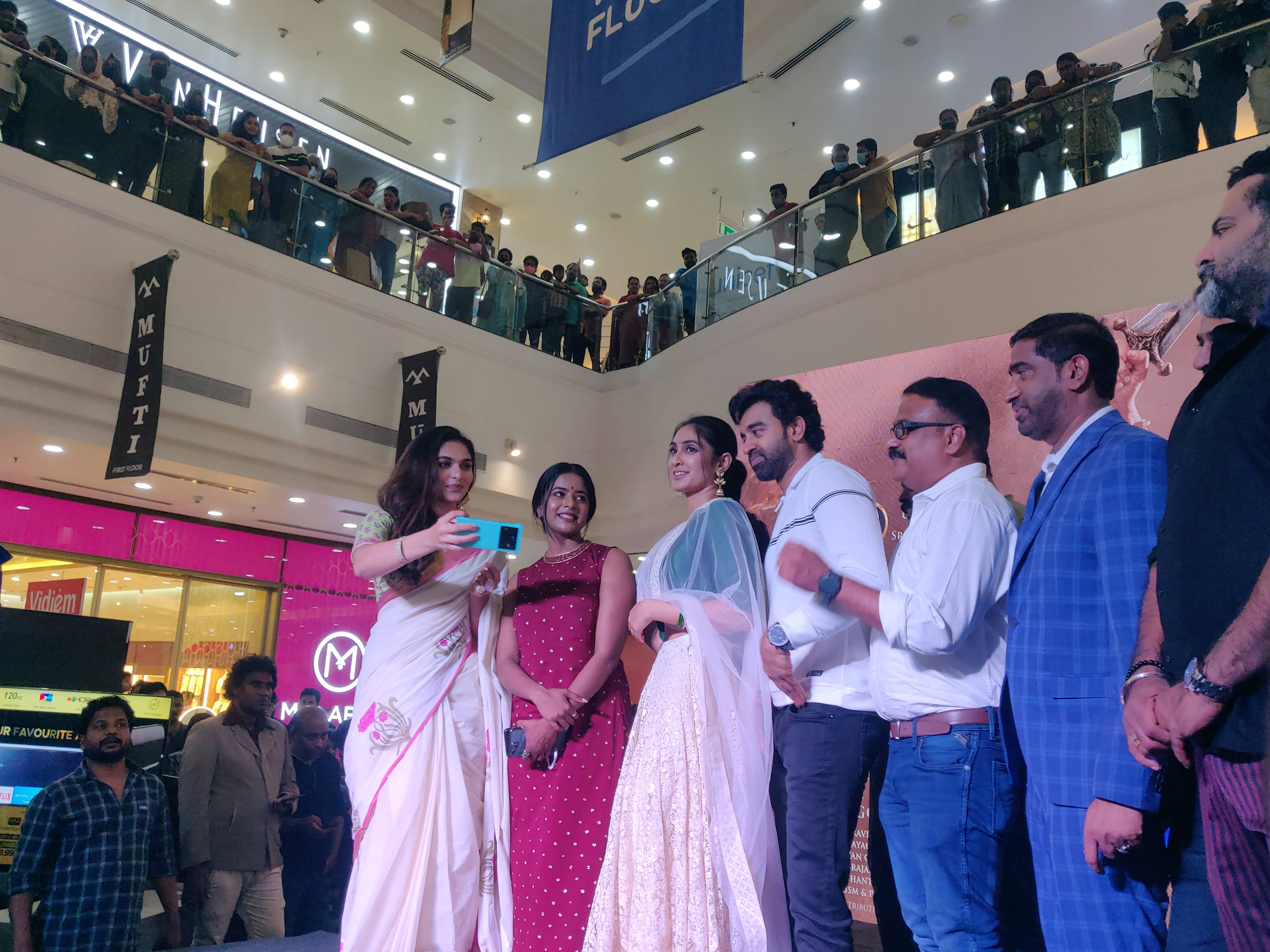
Promotion event at Lulu Mall Kochi

=== Theatrical ===
Initially the film was scheduled theatrical release on 8 September 2022 in Malayalam and dubbed versions of Hindi, Tamil, Telugu and Kannada languages simultaneously. The film was released in India and GCC on 8 September 2022. As the censoring of the dubbed copies was not completed the film was released only in Malayalam language on 8 September 2022. Later the film was released in dubbed versions Hindi, Tamil, Telugu and Kannada languages.

=== Marketing ===
The teaser trailer of the film was released on June 3, 2022, through the official social media pages of celebrities including Mammootty and Mohanlal. The trailer of the movie was released on 20 August 2022. The theatrical trailer of the film was launched in the Metaverse as well. This was the first Malayalam movie trailer was released in metaverse.

=== Home media ===
The film had its OTT premiere through Amazon Prime Video on 7 November 2022.

== Reception ==
=== Critical response ===
The Times of India rated the film 4 out of 5 stars and wrote "A heartfelt historical narrative". Onmanorama wrote "An exceptional treat from Vinayan, Siju Wilson". The Hindu wrote "A package with some punch, despite its failings".

Hindu Aikya Vedi said that there are historical inaccuracies in the film, saying that Nangeli's story is fictional and there was no tax on breast, and Velayudha Panicker was killed by his relative who converted to Islam. Vinayan addressed the accusations saying that he had taken artistic liberty and the film is not a documentary and has omitted some things.

=== Accolades ===
Award	Category	Recipient	Ref.
Kerala State Film Awards	Best Music Director	M. Jayachandran	
Kerala State Film Awards	Best Female Playback Singer	Mridula Warrier	
Kerala State Film Awards	Best Dubbing Artist Male	Shobi Thilakan	
Kerala Film Critics Association Award	Best Historic Film	Pathonpatham Noottandu	
Kerala Film Critics Association Award	Best Costume Design	Dhanya Balakrishnan	
