= I Prem U =

- Promotional release poster
- Directed by: Niteen Gokul Kaher
- Written by: Niteen Gokul Kaher
- Produced by: Madhukar Gursal; Niteen Gokul Kaher
- Starring: Abhijit Amkar; Kayadu Lohar; Sanjay Mone
- Cinematography: Avinash Satoskar
- Edited by: Ashish Arjun Gaikar
- Music by: Sangram S Patil; Sanjay Arora; Yashodhan Kadam
- Production company: Saishri Entertainment
- Distributed by: Sunshine Studio
- Release date: 17 March 2023
- Country: India
- Language: Marathi

I Prem U (lit. 'I Love You') is a 2023 Indian Marathi-language romantic film written and directed by Niteen Gokul Kaher in his Marathi debut. Produced by Saishri Entertainment. It stars Abhijit Amkar, Kayadu Lohar (debut in Marathi cinema), Sanjay Mone in lead roles. It was theatrically released on 17 March 2023.

== Cast ==
- Abhijit Amkar as Sakha
- Kayadu Lohar as Veena
- Sanjay Mone
- Pratibha Bhagat
- Aanand Sarjerao Wagh
- Rushikesh Wanburkar
- Samadhan Murtdak
- Saishri Gursal

== Release ==
=== Theatrical ===
The film was theatrically released on 17 March 2023.

== Soundtrack ==
I Prem U

Soundtrack album by Sanju–Sangram
- Released: 2023
- Genre: Feature film soundtrack
- Length: 22:05
- Language: Marathi
- Label: Zee Music Company

Official audio
- I Prem U - Full Album on YouTube

Music is Composed by Sanju-Sangram duo (Sangram S Patil, Sanjay Arora) and Yashodhan Kadam. Background Score is Composed by Sangram S Patil. Vocals were provided by Sanju-Sangram, Ajay Gogavale, Shaan, Palak Muchhal, Vijay Yesudas, Soumee Sailsh, Pallavi Pargaonkar while lyrics by Darshan Bobade, Yashodhan kadam, Sanju-Sangram.

Track listing
| No. | Title | Singer (s) | Length |
|---|---|---|---|
| 1. | "Halu Halu" | Shaan | 4:13 |
| 2. | "Premika" | Vijay Yesudas, Soumee Sailsh | 4:29 |
| 3. | "Koral Naav" | Ajay Gogavle | 5:38 |
| 4. | "Sai Bai G" | Palak Muchhal | 4:50 |
| Total length: | | | 22:05 |
