= Poorna Market =

- Neighbourhood
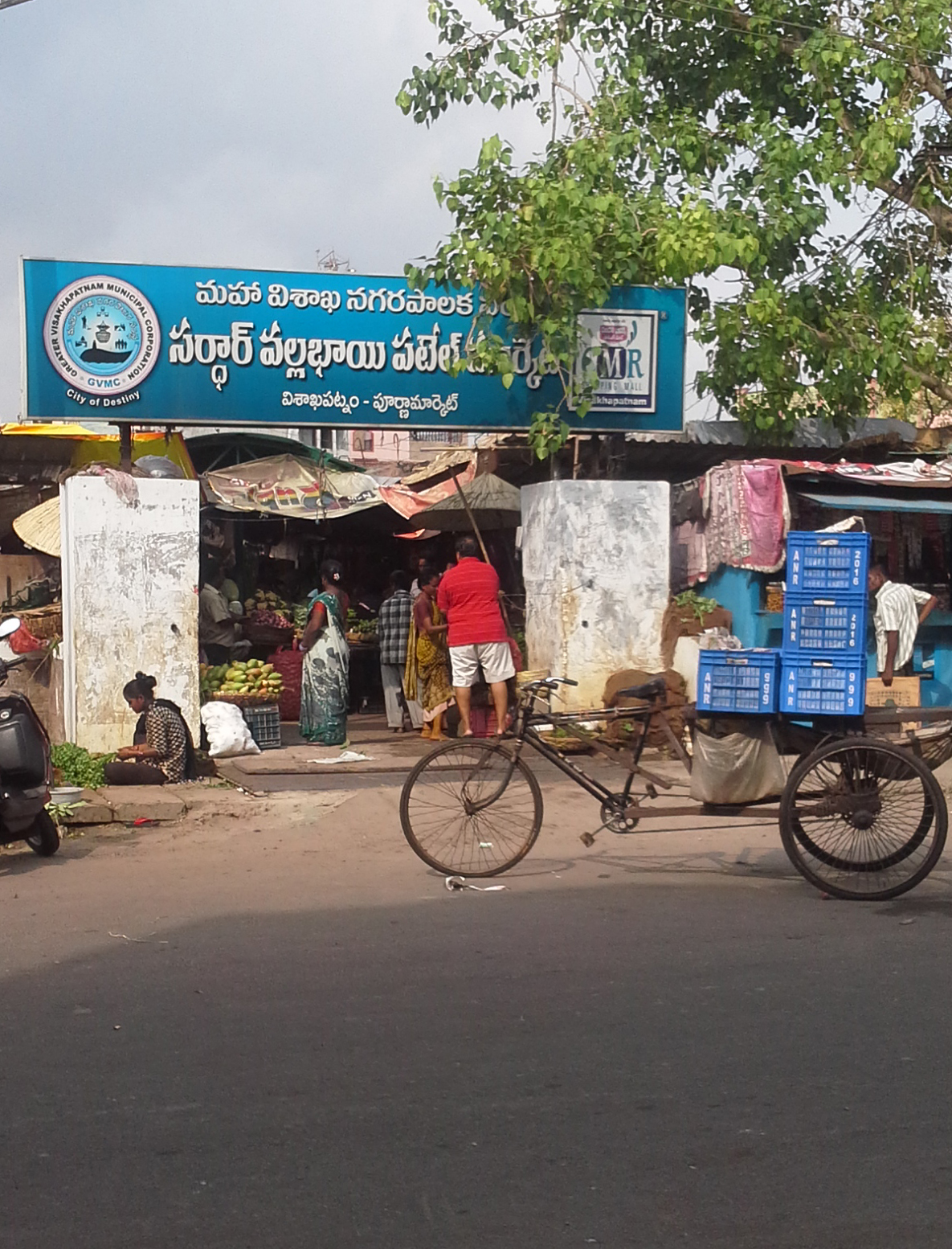

- Location in Visakhapatnam
- Coordinates: 17.706403°N 83.298283°E
- Country: India
- State: Andhra Pradesh
- District: Visakhapatnam

Government
  - Body: Greater Visakhapatnam Municipal Corporation

Languages
  - Official: Telugu
- Time zone: UTC+5:30 (IST)
- PIN: 530001
- Vehicle registration: AP 31, AP 32 and AP 33
- Website: http://gvmc.gov.in/gvmc/index.php/markets

Poorna Market is a famous market in Visakhapatnam, Andhra Pradesh, India. It is also called Sardar Valabai Patel Market.

== History ==
Poorna Market started in 1935, the main market in the city at the time of the Second World War. Japanese aircraft attacked the market.

The market is well connected with all parts of the city.
