= Thandan (surname) =

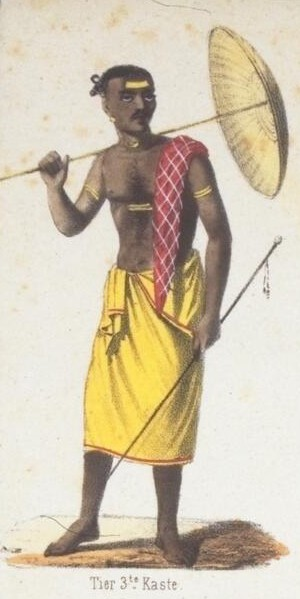

Regions with significant populations
- Palakkad, Kannur

Languages
- Malayalam

Religion
- Hinduism

Thandan (Thiyya Thandan, Thandar) is the honorary surname given to the headman of the mainly Thiyya caste some people in Palakkad, Thrissur district, who reside in the Indian state of Kerala. They are designated as an Other Backward Class by the Government of Kerala.

== Status ==
Thandan was the most commonly used title to represent the highest privilege among the Thiyyar of the Malabar area. The most notable Thiyyar of the Malabars received the title as Thandan for their service to the state in the administration of Malabar district.

The Thandan, the privileged Thiyyar-Karanavar in a dhesam had to carry out the instructions of the politically powerful. He was powerful enough to rule the caste people in his area. In Malabar, the smallest political unit is known as the thara. The head of the thara is known as tharayil karanavar, "the one who got privilege from the king."

== See also ==
- Caste system in India
