= Mannanar dynasty =

Former dynasty in present-day Kerala, India

Mannanar Dynasty
- ?–1902 AD
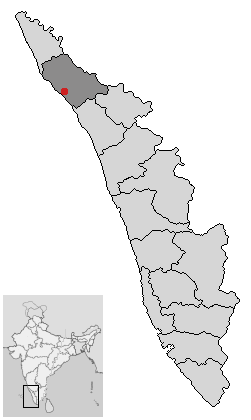
- Mannanar - The Thiyyar King
- Status: Feudatory
- Capital: Muthedath Aramanakkal-Anjukoor vazhcha
- Capital-in-exile: Kannur, Kasargod, Eruvessi- Malabar, Kerala,-- India
- Common languages: Malayalam
- Religion: Hinduism
- Government: Feudal
- History
  - Established: ?
  - East India Company, Madras Presidency- Malabar: 1902 AD
Preceded by	Succeeded by
Mushika dynasty	Company rule in India
- Today part of: Kannur, kerala, India,

The Mannanar dynasty (Malayalam: [mɐn:ɐnɐr]) was a Thiyya dynasty in Malabar, near present-day Kannur and Kasaragod districts of Kerala. The ruins of Mannanar palace can still be seen at the foothills of the Ghats borders of Coorg. The ancient palace in Eruvesi to the northwest of Taliparamba was called as Anju Aramana. Kunnathoor Padi, Muthappan Madapura and Padikutti were their royal family temples.

The head of the Mannanar royal family travelled in a palanquin and was guarded by retainers wearing swords and shield. He had more than 200 armed Nair soldiers. He also held special ranks and privileges, like the titles of "Mannanar" or "Amachchiyar". The ruler who held the third position was known as Vazhunnavar.

A Mannanar leader with title "Muthedath Aramanakkal" had the authority to decide disputes within the caste and jurisdiction was invoked on appeal. Leaders like Kunhi Kelappaan Mannanar and Krishnan Vazhunnavar held lands in the eastern hilly tracts of Chirakkal Thaluk and is noted for giving refuge to other castes.

== Etymology ==
He is referred to as Mannanar (Mannan Means = King ar = honorific plural suffix), also (mannan) meaning king and ar, which pluralises it. That word derivered from King

== Kingdom ==
=== History ===
In the Malayalam mannan means king and 'ar' pluralises the name for adding respectability to it. Mannanar dynasty had thrived for several centuries in Eruvessi, north east of Taliparamba in North Malabar. He was called ruler of the five places and he had five palaces Moothedath Aramana, Elayidath Aramana, Puthan Araman, Puthiyidath Aramana and Mundaya Aramana. He also had royal establishments, such as fortress, palace, assembly hall, performance theatre and living mansion. His assumption to the throne was by the performance of the ritual Aryittuvazhcha (offer of rice to gods as an auspicious item indicating prosperity) as in the case of the Zamorin. His personal residence (living mansion) had adorned the name mannanar kotta or the king's fort.

C.A. innes was the Special Settlement Officer in Malabar. According to the Survey Settlement Register of Eruveshi Land No. 81, Chirakal Taluk, Malabar District, published from Kozhikode on 30-03-1905, Moothedath Aramanaikkal Kunjikelappan Mannanar has several acres of land in Eruveshi Land. Of these, 23 mountains are listed separately – Areekal mala, Karinkanyamala, Cherambathan mala, Mottumala, Mundan Vilangamala, Vanchiaramala, Adapatamala, Vellatam, Paramala, Karumpath Paramala, Kallangacheri mala, Elampanam mala, Palliyambamala, Ariidum kalamala, Kiliyatuparamala, Kunayanpuzumamala, Ottapunam mala, Vaali Elambamalamala, Kodakan Korandimala Kallu Mala, Vilangamala, Tarannenmavumala, two Kshetrakad Paithalmala in Pullalam, Kotan Pilavumala in the East and the Western Ghats to the eastern border of Karnataka. Apart from this, there are Aramanaparam, Kottamullaparambu, Munya Aramanaparam, Munya Tundi, Munya Paramba, Kitchenkunn Mala, Punakandiparambu, Valliyambamala Parambu, Puzhayaruvath Parambu, Padikkutazhekari, Ara Manakandi Parambu, Kitchinkunnu Parambu, Phuyadath Parambu, Malayan's Parambu, Karuvellari Eastekarambu, Velayampamala.The extent of the hilly areas alone, extending from the Western Ghats to the eastern Karnataka border, is 2230 acres. Apart from this, a large amount of agricultural land in several survey numbers is also recorded in the name of Aramanakkal Kelappan Mannanar at Muthetadath.

In 1905, after the introduction of Janmi-tenant system, the British Government published the Settlement Register including these places.

In 1822, the Mannanar dynasty declined when the British imposed a large land tax. It was Karakkattidam Nayanars who were vassals of Mannanars who were allowed to collect taxes in Chuzhali Swarupam which included Eruveshi. The rule at that time was that the person in whose name the land was taxed would automatically become entitled. To make matters worse, Chirakkal Kovilakom was against Mannanar and in favor of Karakkattidam. With the support of Kovilakam, the Nayanamars literally started crushing the Mannanars to death. In connection with that, litigation was held in Thalassery Sub Court and Payyannur Tukhipidi (Thukitti) Magistrate Court. No. 307 registered in Payyannur Court in 1859 is a living one. The case occurred when the last Mannanar in the history of the Mannanar clan, Muthetattarmanakal Kunhikelapan Mannanar, was killed. Kunjikelappan Mannanar, who was returning after checking the accounts at Nuchiat Temple, was accompanied by five escorts. The assailants brought from Malappuram surrounded and stabbed Mannanare to death with a dagger. Police records show that Mannanar was killed by unknown persons on 27 March 1902.

The last of the Mannanars, Kunjikelappan died in 1901-1902 AD. His wife respectably called Ammachiyàr (revered mother) and two of his children were alive in the thirties. The Mannanar who followed matriarchal system as a means of his survival, used to dine at the palace of the Chirakkal raja on important occasions when for him food had to be served on tender plantain leaf named pattila (silken leaf) and for other princes on plantain leaf softened over the fire. When the palaces of other rajas in Kerala are called Kovilakams or Kottarams, only Mannanar's is called Aramana, the mansion of the king (aracha (king) + mana (king's court). For these reasons and for many other, Kampil Ananthan believes that he was the oldest ruler of Kerala.

After the overlordship of the Nampootiri was established, it was the social responsibility of the Mannanar to give protection to either as his wife or as his sister to the Nampootiri woman ex-communicated from her family for offences like infidelity, loss of chastity and violation of the rules of pollution. His palaces and mansions have broken down due to neglect in the absence of successors.

== Customs ==
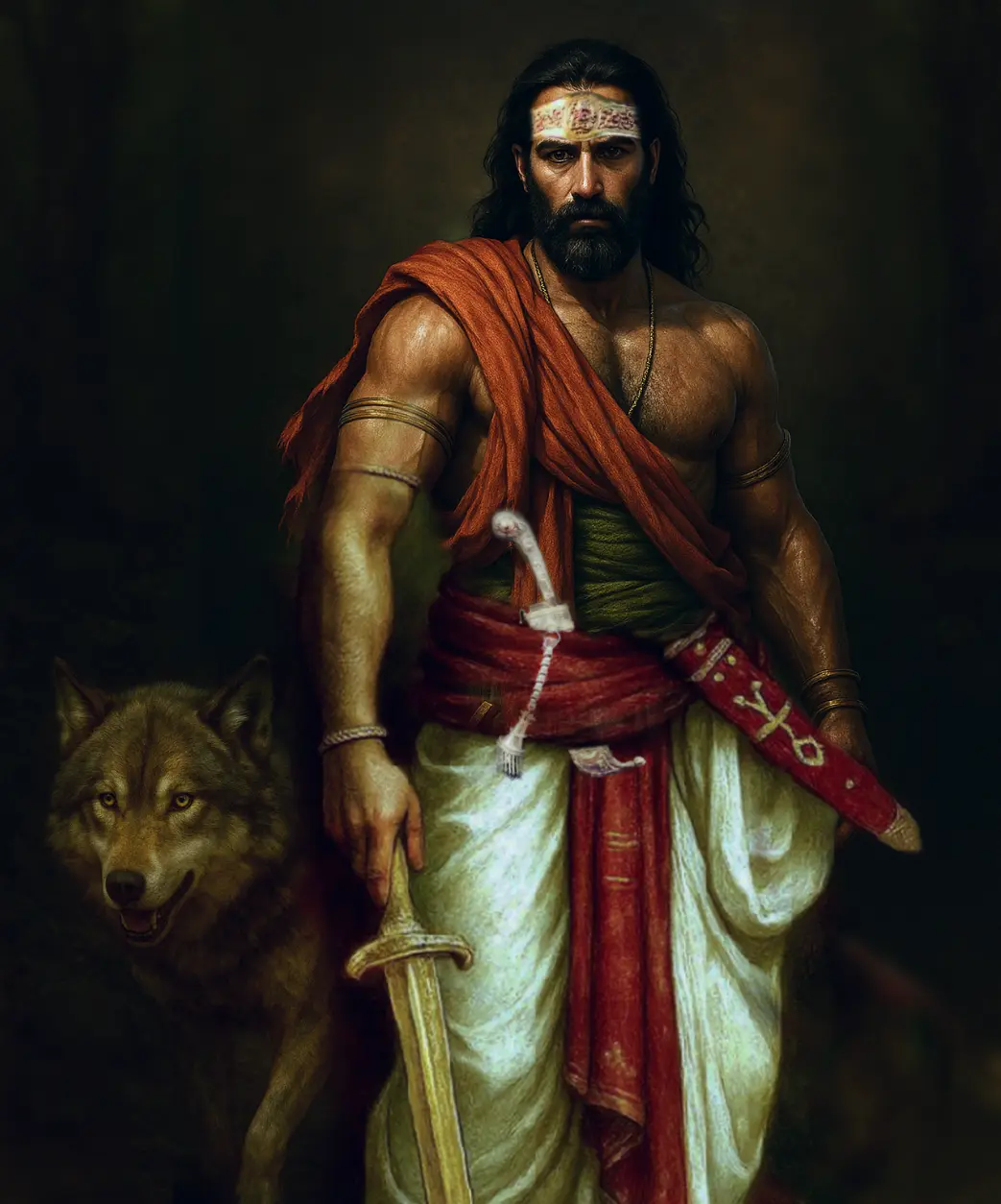
An illustration depicting or related to the Vitihotra Mannanar dynasty.

The well-known Mannanar belonged to the Varakat illam (Varaka Thiyyar). The Varaka Thiyyar or Varakat illam Mannanar were further allowed to wear gold jewels on the neck, to don silken cloth, to fasten a sword round the waist, and to carry a shield. Th sword was made of thin pliable steel, and worn round the like belt, the point being fastened to the hilt through a small hole near the point.

== See also ==
- Kolathiri
