= Ezhava =

Hindu community of Kerala, India

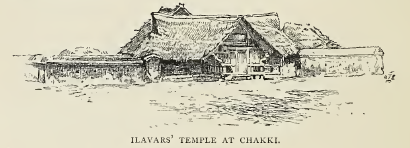
- An ancient Ezhava temple in 19th Century near Trivandrum.

Total population
- Approx. 8,000,000 (2018)

Regions with significant populations
- Kerala

Languages
- Malayalam

Religion
- Hinduism

Related ethnic groups
- Billava, Sinhalese

The Ezhavas (Malayalam: [iːɻɐʋɐ]), also known as Thiyya or Tiyyar (Malayalam: [t̪ijːɐ]) in the Malabar region, and Chegavar/Chovar (Malayalam: [tʃeɡɐʋɐr, tʃoːʋɐr]) in the south, are a community with origins in the region of India presently known as Kerala, where in the 2010s they constituted about 23% of the population and were reported to be the largest Hindu community.

Ezhava dynasties such as the Mannanar existed in Kerala. The British also formed a separate regiment in the British Indian Army called the Thiyyar Regiment in Malabar, which was one of the oldest army regiments in India. The British deployed this unit in various military operations.

The Ezhavas are classified as an Other Backward Class by the Government of India under Reservation in India.

== Variations ==
They are also known as Ilhava, Irava, Izhava and Erava in the south of the region; as Chovas, Chokons and Chogons in Central Travancore; and as Thiyyar, Tiyyas and Theeyas in the Malabar region. Some are also known as Thandan, which has caused administrative difficulties due to the presence of a distinct caste of Thandan in the same region. The Thandan or Palakkad Thandan lives mostly in the Alathur, Mannarkad, Palakkad and Ottappalam taluks of Palakkad and Thalapilly taluk of Thrissur. Thiyya group has claimed a distinct identity in the Hindu caste system than the other Ezhava groups but was considered to be of similar caste by colonial and subsequent administrations. Recent research by the KIRTADS indicates that the Ezhavas of southern Kerala and the Thiyyas of Malabar are distinct groups with separate cultural and anthropological identities.

== History ==
=== Inscriptions ===
The earliest use of the word Eelam or Ezham is found in a Tamil-Brahmi inscription as well as in the Sangam literature. The Tirupparankunram inscription found near Madurai in Tamil Nadu and dated on palaeographical grounds to the 1st century BCE, refers to a person as a householder from Eelam (Eela-kudumpikan). The inscription reads "erukatur eelakutumpikan polalaiyan", which translates to "Polalaiyan, (resident of) Erukatur, the husbandman (householder) from Eelam". The Sangam literature Paṭṭiṉappālai, mentions Eelattu-unavu (food from Eelam). One of the prominent Sangam Tamil poets is known as Eelattu Poothanthevanar meaning Poothan-thevan (proper name) hailing from Eelam. (Akanaṉūṟu: 88, 231, 307; Kuṟuntokai: 189, 360, 343; Naṟṟiṇai: 88, 366). The Tamil inscriptions from the Pallava & Chola period dating from 9th century CE link the word with toddy, toddy tapper's quarters (Eelat-cheri), tax on toddy tapping (Eelap-poodchi), a class of toddy tappers (Eelath-chanran). Eelavar is a caste of toddy tappers found in the southern parts of Kerala. Eela-kaasu and Eela-karung-kaasu are refers to coinages found in the Chola inscriptions of Parantaka I.

=== Legend ===
There are myths of origin for the Ezhava. According to some Malayalam folk songs like Vadakkan Pattukal and legends, the Ezhavas were the progeny of four bachelors that the king of Ceylon (Sri Lanka) sent to what is now Kerala at the request of the Chera king Bhaskara Ravi Varma, in the 1st century CE. These men were sent, ostensibly, to set up coconut farming in the region. Another version of the story says that the king sent eight martial families at the request of a Chera king to quell a civil war that had erupted against him.

=== Social and religious divergence ===
It has been suggested that the Ezhavas may share a common heritage with the Nair caste. This theory is based on similarities between numerous of the customs adopted by the two groups, particularly with regard to marking various significant life stages such as childbirth and death, as well as their matrilineal practices and martial history. Oral history, folk songs and other old writings indicate that the Thiyyas were at some point in the past serving in the armies of various kings, including the Zamorins of Calicut and the rulers of the Kingdom of Cochin. Cyriac Pullapilly has said that only a common parentage can explain some of these issues.

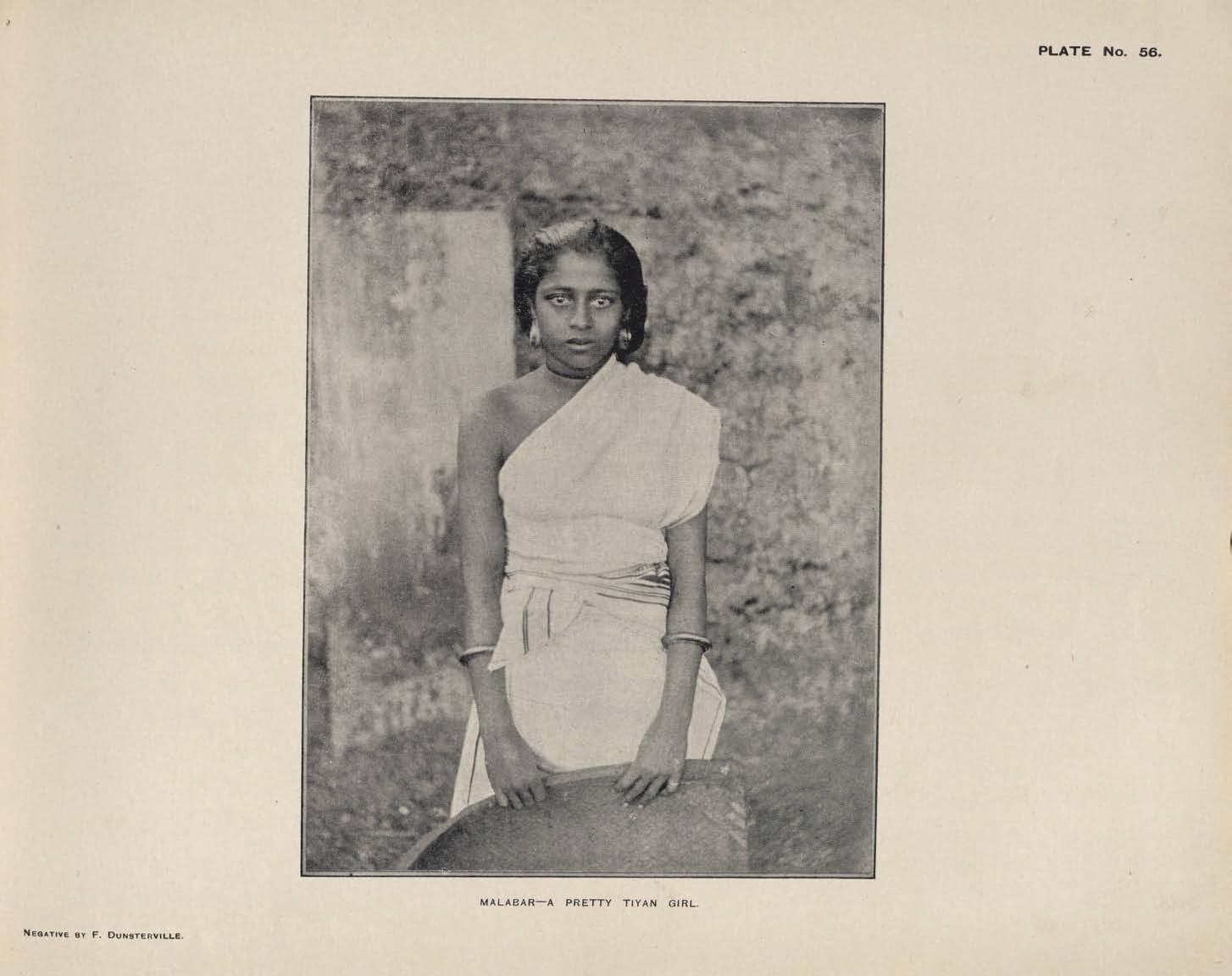
A Thiyan girl, 1898

A theory has been proposed for the origins of the caste system in the Kerala region based on the actions of the Aryan Jains introducing such distinctions prior to the 8th century CE. This argues that the Jains needed protection when they arrived in the area and recruited local sympathizers to provide it. These people were then distinguished from others in the local population by their occupation as protectors, with the others all being classed as out-caste. Pullapilly describes that this meant they "... were given kshatriya functions, but only shudra status. Thus originated the Nairs." The Ezhavas, not being among the group protecting the Jains, became out-castes.

An alternate theory states that the system was introduced by the Nambudiri Brahmins. Although Brahmin influences had existed in the area since at least the 1st century CE, there was a large influx from around the 8th century when they acted as priests, counsellors and ministers to invading Aryan princes. At the time of their arrival the non-aboriginal local population had been converted to Buddhism by missionaries who had come from the north of India and from Ceylon. The Brahmins used their symbiotic relationship with the invading forces to assert their beliefs and position. Buddhist temples and monasteries were either destroyed or taken over for use in Hindu practices, thus undermining the ability of the Buddhists to propagate their beliefs.

The Buddhist tradition of the Ezhavas, and the refusal to give it up, pushed them to an outcaste role within the greater Brahminic society. This tradition is still evident as Ezhavas show greater interest in the moral, non-ritualistic, and non-dogmatic aspects of the religion rather than the theological.

== Past occupations ==
The Ezhavas used to work as agricultural labourers, small cultivators, toddy tappers and liquor businessmen; some were also involved in weaving and some practised Ayurveda. An upper section of Ezhavas, by reason of wealth and/or influence, came into the position to acquire titles such as Panicker from the local rulers. These people lived in Nalukettu, had their private temples and owned a large amount of land.

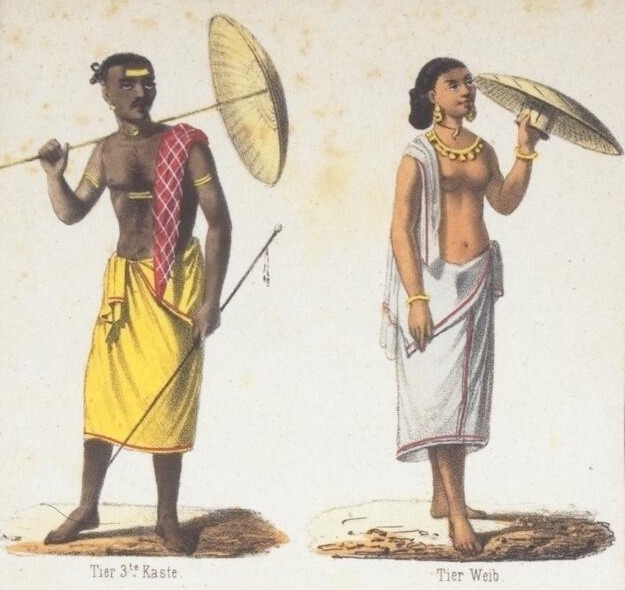
A Thiyya couple, 18th century

The social anthropologists Filippo and Caroline Osella say that the Ezhavas "... consisted in the mid-nineteenth century of a small landowning and titled elite and a large mass of landless and small tenants who were largely illiterate, considered untouchable, and who eked out a living by manual labour and petty trade." (Note: Gough describes Ezhava subtenants in Central Travancore, who worked land held by the Nair caste. One-third of the net produce from these lands was retained by the subtenants and the remainder was the property of the Nair tenant.) A. Aiyappan, another social anthropologist and himself a member of the caste, noted the mythical belief that the Ezhava brought coconut palms to the region when they moved from Ceylon. Their traditional occupation, or avakasam, was tending to and tapping the sap of such palms. This activity is sometimes erroneously referred to as toddy tapping, toddy being a liquor manufactured from the sap. Arrack was another liquor produced from the palms, as was jaggery (an unrefined sugar). In reality, most Ezhavas were agricultural labourers and small-time cultivators, with a substantial number diverging into the production of coir products, such as coconut mats for flooring, from towards the end of the 19th century. The coastal town of Alleppey became the centre of such manufacture and was mostly controlled by Ezhavas, although the lucrative export markets were accessible only through European traders, who monopolised the required equipment. A boom in trade for these manufactured goods after World War I led to a unique situation in twentieth-century Kerala whereby there was a shortage of labour, which attracted still more Ezhavas to the industry from outlying rural areas. The Great Depression impacted in particular on the export trade, causing a reduction in price and in wages even though production increased, with the consequence that during the 1930s many Ezhava families found themselves to be in dire financial circumstances.

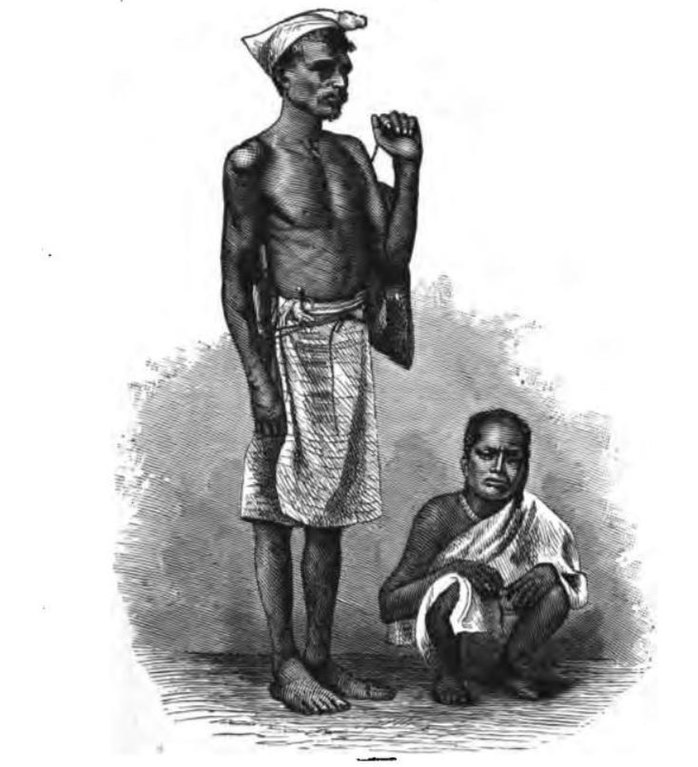
An Ezhava couple, 19th century

Some Ezhavas were involved in weaving and ship making.

=== Martial traditions ===
Some Ezhava served in army of local chieftains and local rulers such as of Kadathanad and Kurumbranad of Kerala, who were privileged in the pre-colonial period to have their own private armies.

==== Chekavar ====
A subgroup of the Ezhavas considered themselves to be warriors and became known as the Chekavars. The Vadakkan Pattukal ballads describe Chekavars as forming the militia of local chieftains and kings but the title was also given to experts of Kalari Payattu.

=== Medicine and traditional toxicology ===
Some Ezhavas had an extensive knowledge of the medicinal value of plants, passed to them by their ancestors. Known as Vaidyars, these people acted as physicians. Itty Achudan was probably the best known Ezhava physician: he directly influenced the botanical classification in Hortus Malabaricus, published during the 17th century. Achudan's texts were written in the Kolezhuthu script that Ezhava castes used, for they were prevented from learning the more Sanskritised Aryazuthu script which was the preserve of the upper-castes.

Some Ezhavas practiced ayurvedic medicine.

== Culture ==
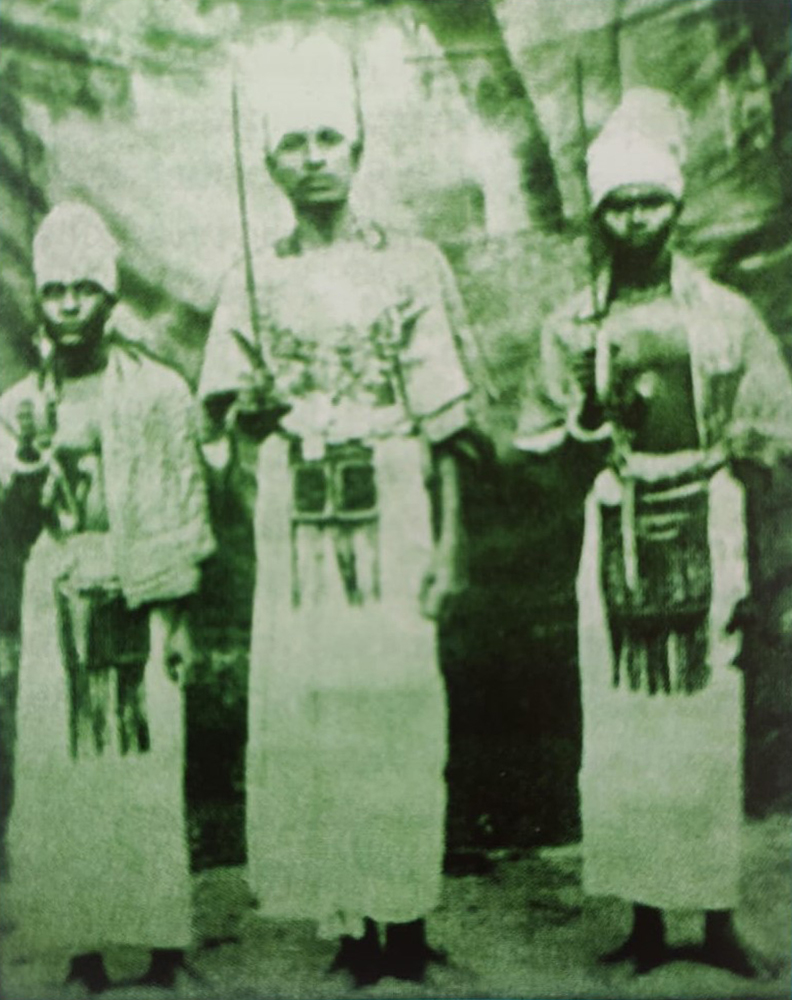
The traditional attire of Thiyyar (Tiyya) Bridegroom and companions, in 1912

=== Arjuna Nrtam (Mayilpeeli Thookkam) ===
Arjuna Nrtam ("the dance of Arjuna") is a ritual art performed by Ezhava men and is prevalent in the Bhagavathy temples of south Kerala, mainly in Kollam, Alappuzha and Kottayam districts. The ritual is also called "Mayilpeeli Thookkam" because the costume includes a characteristic garment made of mayilppeeli (peacock feathers). This garment is worn around the waist in a similar fashion as the "uduthukettu" of Kathakali. The various dance movements are similar to kalarippayattu techniques. The performers have their faces painted green and wear distinctive headgears. The all-night performance of the dance is usually presented solo or in pairs.

=== Makachuttu ===
Makachuttu art is popular among Ezhavas in Thiruvananthapuram and Chirayinkizhu taluks and in Kilimanoor, Pazhayakunnummal and Thattathumala regions. In this, a group of eight performers, two each, twine around each other like serpents and rise up, battling with sticks. The techniques are repeated several times. Sandalwood paste on the forehead, a red towel round the head, red silk around the waist and bells round the ankles form the costume. This is a combination of snake worship and Kalarippayattu.

=== Poorakkali ===
Poorakkali is a folk dance prevalent among the Ezhavas of Malabar, usually performed in Bhagavathy temples as a ritual offering during the month of Meenam (March–April). Poorakkali requires specially trained and highly experienced dancers, trained in Kalaripayattu. Standing round a traditional lamp, the performers dance in eighteen different stages and rhythms, each phase called a niram.

== Customs ==
Ezhavas adopted different patterns of behavior in family system across Kerala. Those living in southern Travancore tended to meld the different practices that existed in the other parts of Kerala. The family arrangements of northern Malabar were matrilineal with patrilocal property arrangements, whereas in northern Travancore they were matrilineal but usually matrilocal in their arrangements for property. Southern Malabar saw a patrilineal system but partible property.

These arrangements were reformed by legislation, for Malabar in 1925 and for Travancore in 1933. The process of reform was more easily achieved for the Ezhavas than it was for the Nairs, another Hindu caste in Kerala who adopted matrilineal arrangements; the situation for the Nairs was complicated by a traditional matrilocal form of living called taravadu and by their usually much higher degree of property ownership. That said, certainly by the 1880s, the Ezhavas appear increasingly to have tried to adopt Nair practises in a bid to achieve a similar status. Robin Jeffrey notes that their women began to prefer the style of jewellery worn by Nairs to that which was their own tradition. Further, since Nairs cremated their dead, Ezhavas attempted to cremate at least the oldest member of their family, although cost usually meant that the remainder were buried. Other aspirational changes included building houses in the Nair tharavad style and making claims that they had had an equal standing as a military class until the nineteenth century.

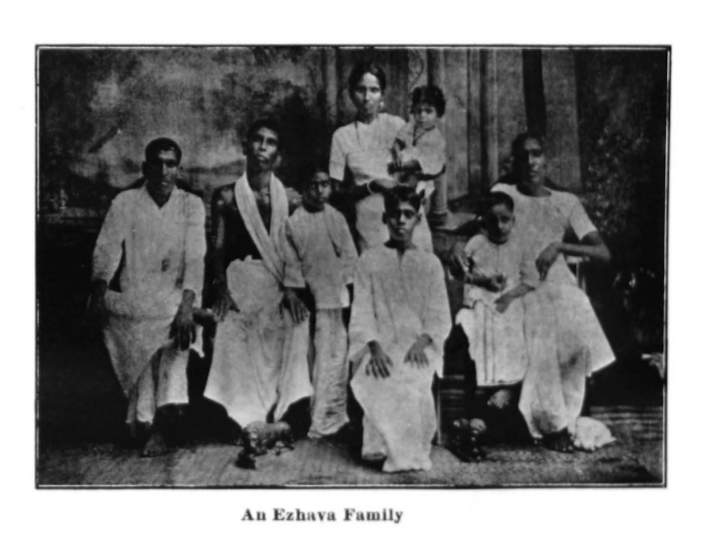
An Ezhava family of early 20th century

Polygamy was practised in within certain parts of Ezhava community, but has since died out. There are several proposed arguments for this, the Valiyagraman Ezhavas argue that they practised it for economic reasons, the argument that the older brother would marry first, and share his wife with his younger brother(s) until they could afford to marry. It was also common for one of the brothers to be away for long periods of time.

Following the British settlement in what became Kerala, some Thiyya families in Thalassery were taken as concubines by British administrative officers who were in charge of Malabar District. Children resulted from these relationships and were referred to as "white Thiyyas". These liaisons were considered as "dishonourable" and "degrading" to the Thiyya community and were excluded from it. Most of these women and children became Christians. The Thiyyas in northern Malabar generally had a better relationship with colonisers than the Hindus in other parts of the country. This was due in part to the fact that the British would employ Thiyyas but local princes would not.

== Spiritual and social movements ==
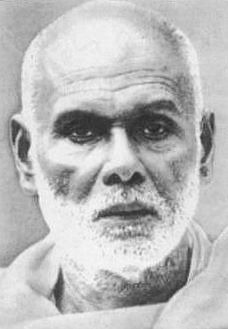
Narayana Guru

Some Thiyyas converted to Islam from around the 9th century, due to the influence of Arab traders. These people, and other Muslim converts in the region, are now known as Mappillas. A sizeable part of the Ezhava community, especially in central Travancore and in the High Ranges, embraced Christianity during the British rule, due to caste-based discrimination. In Kannur, Protestant missions started working in the first half of the 19th century, notably the Basel German Evangelical Mission. Most of their converts were from the Thiyya community. The Congregationalist London Missionary Society and the Anglican Church Mission Society were also prominent in the movement for religious conversion, having established presences in the Travancore region in the early 19th century.

The lowly status of the Ezhava meant that, as Thomas Nossiter has commented, they had "little to lose and much to gain by the economic and social changes of the nineteenth and twentieth centuries". They sought the right to be treated as worthy of an English education and for jobs in government administration to be open to them. An early Ezhava campaigner and their "political father", according to Ritty Lukose, was Padmanabhan Palpu. In 1896, he organised a petition of 13,176 signatories that was submitted to the Maharajah of the princely state of Travancore, asking for government recognition of the Ezhavas' right to work in public administration and to have access to formal education. Around this time, nearly 93 per cent of the caste members were illiterate. (Note: Robin Jeffrey notes that literacy among Ezhava men increased from 3.15 per cent to 12.10 per cent between the 1875 and 1891 censuses, mainly through the work of missionaries rather than government schools.) The upper caste Hindus of the state prevailed upon the Maharajah not to concede the request. The outcome not looking to be promising, the Ezhava leadership threatened that they would convert from Hinduism en masse, rather than stay as helots of Hindu society. C. P. Ramaswamy Iyer, realising the imminent danger, prompted the Maharajah to issue the Temple Entry Proclamation, which abolished the ban on lower-caste people from entering Hindu temples in the state. Steven Wilkinson says that the Proclamation was passed because the government was "frightened" by the Ezhava threat of conversion to Christianity.

Eventually, in 1903, a small group of Ezhavas, led by Palpu, established Sree Narayana Dharma Paripalana Yogam (SNDP), the first caste association in the region. This was named after Narayana Guru, who had established an ashram from where he preached his message of "one caste, one religion, one god" and a Sanskritised version of the Victorian concept of self-help. His influence locally has been compared to that of Swami Vivekananda. One of the initial aims of the SNDP was to campaign for the removal of the restrictions on school entry but even after those legal barriers to education were removed, it was uncommon in practice for Ezhavas to be admitted to government schools. Thus, the campaign shifted to providing schools operated by the community itself. The organisation, attracted support in Travancore but similar bodies in Cochin were less successful. In Malabar, which unlike Cochin and Travancore was under direct British control, the Ezhavas showed little interest in such bodies because they did not suffer the educational and employment discrimination found elsewhere, nor indeed were the disadvantages that they did experience strictly a consequence of caste alone.

The Ezhavas were not immune to being manipulated by other people for political purposes. The Vaikom Satyagraha of 1924–1925 was a failed attempt to use the issue of avarna access to roads around temples in order to revive the fortunes of Congress, orchestrated by T. K. Madhavan, a revolutionary and civil rights activist, and with a famous temple at Vaikom as the focal point. Although it failed in its stated aim of achieving access, the satyagraha (movement) did succeed in voicing a "radical rhetoric", according to Nossiter. During this movement, a few Akalis—an order of armed Sikhs—came to Vaikom in support of the demonstrators. After the eventual passing of the Temple Entry Proclamation, some of the Akalis remained. They attracted some Ezhava youth to the concepts of the Sikhism, resulting in Ezhava conversions to that belief.

Between the Travancore census of 1875 and 1891, the literacy of Ezhava men had been increased from 3.15 percent to 12.1 percent. The 1891 census showed that there were at least 25000 educated Ezhavas in Travancore Dr. Palpu had support from Parameswaran Pillai who was editing the Madras Standard. He raised the issue of the rights of Ezhavas in a speech at the National Conference in Pune in 1885, which was also editorialized in the Madras Standard. Pillai and Dr. Palpu also raised their questions regarding Ezhavas in the House of Commons in England in 1897. Palpu met with Swamy Vivekanda in Mysore and discussed the conditions of Ezhavas. Vivekanda has advised him to unite the Ezhava community under the leadership of a spiritual leader. He embraced this advice and associated with Sree Narayana Guru and formed the Sree Narayana Dharma Paripalana Yogam (S.N.D.P), registered in March 1903. By mid 1904, the emerging S.N.D.P Yogam, operating a few schools, temples, and a monthly magazine announced that it would hold an industrial exhibition with its second annual general meeting in Quilon in January 1905. The exhibition was skillful and successful and was a sign of the awakening Ezhava community.

The success of the SNDP in improving the lot of Ezhavas has been questioned. Membership had reached 50,000 by 1928 and 60,000 by 1974, but Nossiter notes that, "From the Vaikom satyagraha onwards the SNDP had stirred the ordinary Ezhava without materially improving his position." The division in the 1920s of 60,000 acres (24,000 ha) of properties previously held by substantial landowners saw the majority of Ezhava beneficiaries receive less than one acre each, although 2% of them took at least 40% of the available land. There was subsequently a radicalisation and much political infighting within the leadership as a consequence of the effects of the Great Depression on the coir industry but the general notion of self-help was not easy to achieve in a primarily agricultural environment; the Victorian concept presumed an industrialised economy. The organisation lost members to various other groups, including the Communist movement, and it was not until the 1950s that it reinvented itself as a pressure group and provider of educational opportunities along the lines of the Nair Service Society (NSS), Just as the NSS briefly formed the National Democratic Party in the 1970s in an attempt directly to enter the political arena, so too in 1972 the SNDP formed the Social Revolutionary Party.

== Position in society ==
They were considered as avarna (outside brahmanical varna system) by the Nambudiri Brahmins who formed the Hindu clergy and ritual ruling elite in late medieval Kerala. Kathleen Gough says that the Ezhavas of Central Travancore were historically the highest-ranking of the "higher polluting castes", a group whose other constituents included Kanisans and various artisanal castes, and who were all superior in status to the "lower polluting castes", such as the Pulayars and Paraiyars. The Nairs and, where applicable, the Mapillas ranked socially and ritually higher than the polluting castes. (Note: Kathleen Gough says of the Mappillas that they "... lived mainly in the ports and at inland trading posts on the banks of rivers. They were partly outside the village ranking system ... and were theoretically outside the Hindu religious hierarchy. Nevertheless Muslims were in some contexts accorded a rank ritually and socially between that of the Nayars and Tiyyars.") From their study based principally around one village and published in 2000, the Osellas noted that the movements of the late 19th- and 20th centuries brought about a considerable change for the Ezhavas, with access to jobs, education and the right to vote all assisting in creating an identity based on more on class than caste, although the stigmatic label of avarna remained despite gaining the right of access to temples.

== Dispute between different Ezhava communities ==
Some in the Ezhava community in Malabar have objected to being treated as Ezhava by the government of Kerala, arguing that the Ezhava in Malabar (locally known as Thiyyar) are a separate caste. They have campaigned for the right to record themselves as Thiyya rather than as Ezhava when applying for official posts and other jobs allocated under India's system of positive discrimination. They claim that the stance of the government is contrary to a principle established by the Supreme Court of India relating to a dispute involving communities who were not Ezhava. The Thiyya Mahasabha (a sub-group of the Ezhava in Malabar) has also opposed the SNDP's use of the Thiyya name at an event.

In February 2013, the recently formed Thiyya Mahasabha objected to the SNDP treating Ezhavas and Thiyyas as one group, rather than recognising the Thiyyas in Malabar as being distinct. The SNDP was at that time attempting to increase its relatively weak influence in northern Kerala, where the politics of identity play a lesser role than those of class and the Communist Party of India (Marxist) has historically been a significant organisation.

== See also ==
- List of Ezhavas
- Travancore Labour Association
- Narayana Guru
- Temples consecrated by Narayana Guru
- Padmanabhan Palpu
- R. Sankar
- Sree Narayana Dharma Paripalana Yogam (SNDP)
- Sree Narayana Trust
- List of Sree Narayana Institutions

== Similar communities ==
- Billava
- Namadhari Naik (Halepaika)
- Idiga
- Nadar
