= List of Kalaripayattu practitioners =

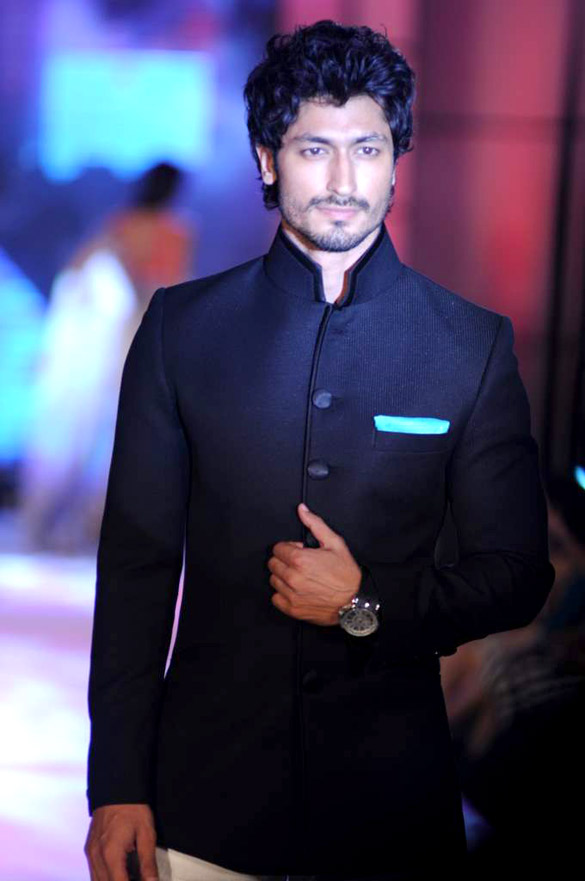
Actor Vidyut Jammwal is a regular practitioner and an endorser of the martial art.

Following is a list of Kalaripayattu practitioners.

== Legendary figures ==
- Agastya, a Hindu sage, and one of the Saptarishi of Hinduism, is credited with influencing the southern style of Kalaripayattu, or Thekkan Kalari as per myth.
- Ayyappan, prince of Pandalam dynasty and the deity of Sabarimala.
- Parashurama, an avatar of the Hindu deity Vishnu, generally regarded as the founder of Kalaripayattu, especially the northern style or Vadakkan Kalari, as per myth.

== 12th century – 19th century ==
- Arattupuzha Velayudha Panicker
- Aromal Chekavar
- Chandu Chekavar
- Giacomo Fenicio, an Italian Christian priest of Arthunkal.
- Kadhirur Gurukkal
- Kayamkulam Kochunni, an outlaw known for helping the poor.
- Keeleri Kunhikannan, a gymnast and martial artist.
- Thacholi Othenan
- Thevar vellan, the warrior Thacholi othenan could not defeat because of martial art skills
- Unniyarcha

== 20th century – present ==
- Adah Sharma, Indian actress.
- Aditi Rao Hydari, Bollywood actress.
- Akhila Sasidharan, Malayalam actress.
- Asin, Indian actress.
- C. Gangadharan, martial artist, PhD holder in Kalaripayattu.
- Dia Mirza, Bollywood actress.
- Eyal Meyer, Chilean actor and official representative of Kalaripayattu in Chile.
- Jacqueline Fernandez, Bollywood actress.
- Jasmine Simhalan, martial artist and classical dancer.
- Lissy, Malayalam actress.
- Meenakshi Amma, a Kalaripayattu teacher and Padma Sri recipient.
- Parineeti Chopra, Bollywood actress.
- Phillip B. Zarrilli, a theatre actor, acting coach and academician, first PhD holder in Kalaripayattu.
- Prashob P P, martial artist and kalaripayattu teacher, Kalaripayattu promoter.
- Ranbir Kapoor, Bollywood actor.
- Sankara Narayana Menon Chundayil, Kalaripayattu teacher and Padma Sri recipient
- Sanya Malhotra, Bollywood actress.
- Simhalan Madhava Panicker, martial artist and actor.
- Tiger Shroff, Bollywood actor.
- Vasundhara Doraswamy, a classical dancer and teacher.
- Vidyut Jammwal, a Bollywood actor and Kalaripayattu endorser.
