= Anandabhadram =

- Promotional poster
- Directed by: Santosh Sivan
- Written by: Sunil Parameshwaran
- Produced by: Maniyanpilla Raju; Ajaya Chandran Nair; Reghu Chandran Nair (Sri Bhadra Pictures); Rajendran(Raju) (executive)
- Starring: Prithviraj Sukumaran; Manoj K. Jayan; Kavya Madhavan; Kalabhavan Mani; Biju Menon
- Cinematography: Santosh Sivan
- Edited by: Sreekar Prasad
- Music by: Kannan (score); M. G. Radhakrishnan (songs)
- Production companies: Sree Bhadhra Pictures; Media Zen
- Distributed by: Vyshaka Release
- Release date: 1 November 2005
- Running time: 138 minutes
- Country: India
- Language: Malayalam

Anandabhadram (transl.”eternally safe”) is a 2005 Indian Malayalam-language dark fantasy horror film based on the novel of the same name by Sunil Parameshwaran, and directed by Santosh Sivan. The story concerns ghosts, spirits, and black magic. The film stars Manoj K. Jayan as the central character, with Prithviraj Sukumaran and Kavya Madhavan in the titular roles. While an ensemble cast including Kalabhavan Mani, Biju Menon, Riya Sen, Revathy, Kalasala Babu, Cochin Haneefa and Nedumudi Venu plays other pivotal roles.

The film was inspired by the paintings of Raja Ravi Varma, Theyyam, Kathakali dance movements, and Kalaripayattu martial art form. It rode on a renewed interest in both Ravi Varma and Kalaripayattu in and outside of India. During production, Santosh replaced Sabu Cyril with Sunil Babu as the art director, M. G. Radhakrishnan replaced Vidyasagar as the music director, Gireesh Puthenchery replaced Sreekumaran Thampy as the lyricist and Kavya Madhavan replaced Meera Jasmine as the actress. The audiography of the film was done by M. R. Rajakrishnan .

Anandabhadram was released on November 4 coinciding with Diwali and received critical acclaim for its screenplay, story, music, cinematography, cast performances and horror elements. Most of the critics praised Manoj K. Jayan's performance as Digambaran and the dark atmosphere of the movie. The film was a massive commercial success. The film won five awards in the 2005 Kerala State Film Awards and two in the 2005 Asianet Film Awards. It was also dubbed in Tamil, Telugu (as Sivapuram), Hindi (as Phir Wohi Darr) and English, and was an inspiration for Tanthra (2006), another Malayalam film.

== Plot ==
As a child, Ananthan hears stories from his mother, Gayathri Devi, about her ancestral village, Shivapuram. She tells him of the Shivakavu temple, where thousands of lamps were once lit, and of the black magician Siddhayogi, who wanted to seize all power and stopped the lamps from being lit. She also tells him of the Manthrikapura, a cave temple under the waterfalls, where the sacred Nagamanikyam, the serpent jewel, is kept and protected by the magicians of her family, the Madambi Tharavadu.

The jewel is also protected by the eternally tiny serpent Kunjootan. To obtain the serpent jewel and the sacred scriptures, one needs the presence of a goddess-blessed girl from the Madambi Tharavadu, and so, Siddhayogi kidnapped Gayathri. Siddhayogi was defeated by Gayathri’s grandfather, but he urged his grandson Digambaran to take revenge and gave him his Nagamothiram, a serpent ring that grants power to its wearer. Gayathri was meant to be consecrated as a goddess figure at twenty, which would have required lifelong celibacy. Instead, she fell in love and eloped with Sethu, and a few years later moved to America.

Years later, now an adult, Ananthan returns to Shivapuram to fulfil his late mother’s wish of lighting the lamps at Shivakavu. On his first day, Ananthan loses his way in a forest, sees apparitions, and is attacked by Digambaran, whose rituals he has disturbed. The next day he is woken up by the villagers and meets his family, including his cousin Bhadra, who is the next goddess-in-waiting, and her elder sister Subhadra, who has long been missing. He also meets Bhama, a young woman whose mind Digambaran seizes so that he can use her body for his rituals. Bhama’s brother Chemban was blinded by Digambaran but he is an exceptional swordsman.

It is revealed that Digambaran fell in love with Subhadra and accidentally killed her while covering her mouth to stop her from screaming. He has since preserved her body in magical oils in a boat-shaped vessel inside the Manthrikapura, hoping to revive her, using Bhama's soul and the power of the serpent jewel and sacred scriptures.

Ananthan announces that he will relight the lamps at the abandoned Shivakavu. Bhadra and Ananthan fall in love. Sreeni, a young villager who resents Digambaran and his way of life and fully supports Ananthan, discovers Subhadra’s body in the cave and is killed by Digambaran. Raman Panikker, the astrologer who knows Digambaran’s plan, warns Ananthan against provoking him and says that only his own son, Shivaram, can help Ananthan now. Digambaran then kills Raman Panikker and Shivaram comes back to Shivapuram.

Digambaran discovers in his scriptures that the ritual requires a person born under the Ayilyam nakshatra, a condition fulfilled by Ananthan. The ceremony to consecrate Bhadra as a goddess collapses and Digambaran performs a ritual to take over Ananthan’s body. To possess Ananthan’s body, Digambaran must sleep in an oil filled vessel in the cave temple.

Shivaram performs a ritual that appears to free Bhama, but she still remains under Digambaran’s influence. Shivaram tells Chemban to watch her and explains that Digambaran would lose his power if he broke his Brahmacharya. Bhama overhears this.

Digambaran, in Ananthan’s body, stabs Shivaram and kills him and takes Bhadra to the cave to retrieve the jewel and scriptures. She tries to trick him into entering the oil boat, but he refuses. Bhadra escapes and finds her sister’s body in one of the vessels.

Bhama arrives at the cave and enters the oil boat where Digambaran’s body lies, breaks his celibacy and he kills her. Digambaran then drags Bhadra to a snake pit and tries to cut off her finger to take the jewel but Ananthan, strengthened by the serpents and Kunjootan, wakes and fights him. Ananthan escapes with Bhadra before killing Digambaran. Chemban finds Bhama’s dead body and fights Digambaran. He cuts off Digambaran’s toe so that the serpent ring falls away, then blinds him in both eyes with a sword.

With Digambaran defeated, Shivakavu is restored and its lamps are lit once again. Ananthan and Bhadra are together, and he recalls his mother’s story that the lamps of Shivakavu speak to one another. When Bhadra asks what they might be saying, Ananthan suggests that they are talking about the two of them. The film concludes with Digambaran crying out in pain, powerless and blinded.

== Cast ==
- Prithviraj Sukumaran as Ananthan, an American NRI, who returns to his hometown, Sivapuram, to fulfill his late mother's wishes and later, is at loggerheads with Digambaran.
  - Master Thejas as young Ananthan
- Kavya Madhavan as Bhadra, Ananthan's cousin and love interest (Voice - over by Sreeja Ravi)
- Manoj K. Jayan in dual role as:
  - Digambaran, an evil wizard, who terrorises Sivapuram.
  - Jadaanandha Siddhayogi, grandfather of Digambaran
- Kalabhavan Mani as Chemban, Shivaraman and Digambaran's childhood friend, who opposes Digambaran's wrongdoings
- Cochin Haneefa in a double role as:
  - Maravi Mathayi I, a descendant of the Madampi family.
  - Maravi Mathayi III, a scion of the Mathayi I lineage.
- Biju Menon as Shivaram, Chemban and Digambaran's childhood friend and Raman Panikker's son
- Nedumudi Venu as Padmanabhan, Bhadra's father and Ananthan's maternal uncle
- Kalasala Babu as Raman Panikker, Sivaraman's father and a known astrologer in Sivapuram
- Riya Sen as Bhama, Chemban's sister, whom Digambaran tried to sacrifice in order to revive Subhadra using her soul
- Neethu S Nair as Subhadra, Bhadra's elder sister and Digambaran's love interest
- Akhila Manu Jagadh as Ammu, Bhadra's friend
- Suresh Krishna as SI Hameed Marakkar
- Revathy as Gayathri Devi, Ananthan's mother
- Maniyanpilla Raju as Police Constable Panicker
- Ambika Mohan as a villager
- Indira Thampi as Bhadra's mother
- Santha Devi as Gouri
- Govindankutty as Sreeni
- Kunchan as Nanu Vaidhyar
- T. P. Madhavan as Ravunni Nair
- Lakshmi Krishnamoorthy as Nangeli Muthassi
- Maya Viswanath as Yakshi

== Production ==
=== Development ===
Ananthabhadram is based on the novel of the same name by Sunil Parameswaran. The story was inspired by tales told to Sunil by his grandmother when he was a child. Director Santosh Sivan was also influenced by such stories told by his own grandmother. Set in rural Kerala, the story is a fairy tale dominated by Shakta black magic, martial arts, and tantric seduction rituals.

=== Inspirations ===
Inspired by Raja Ravi Varma

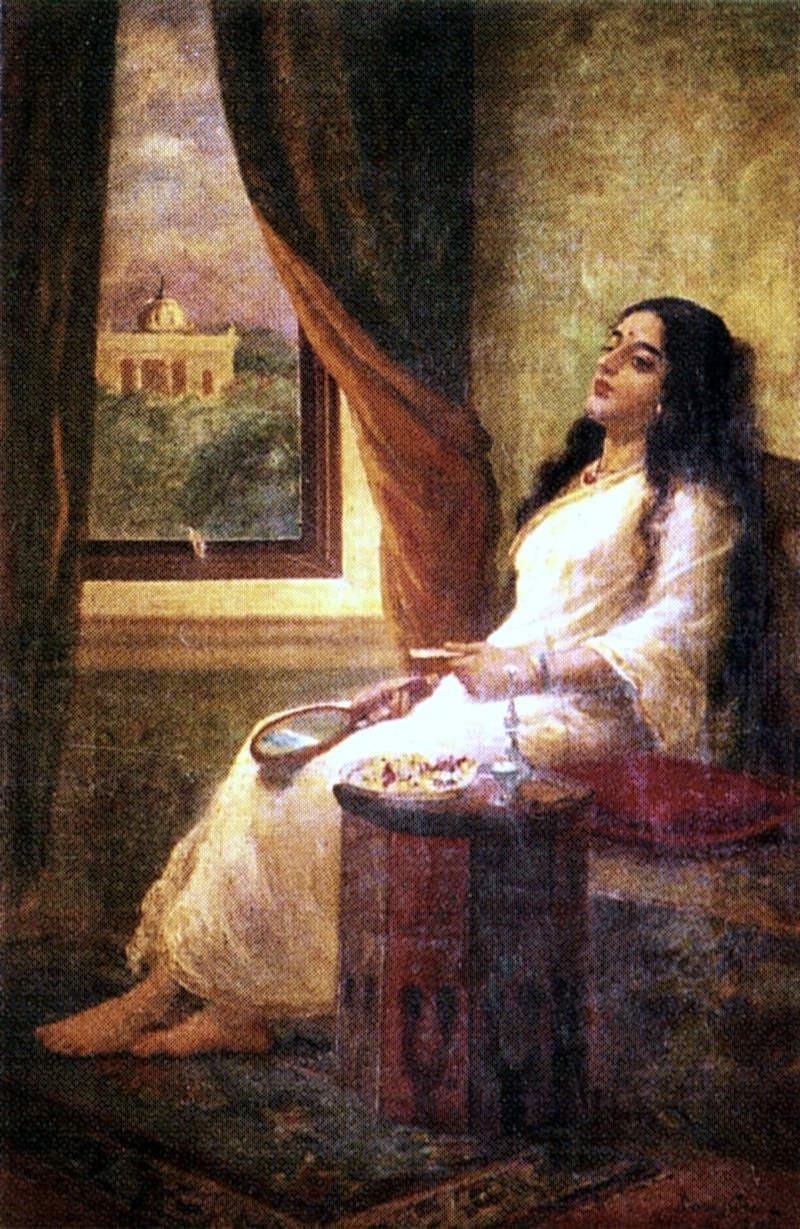
"Woman in thought"

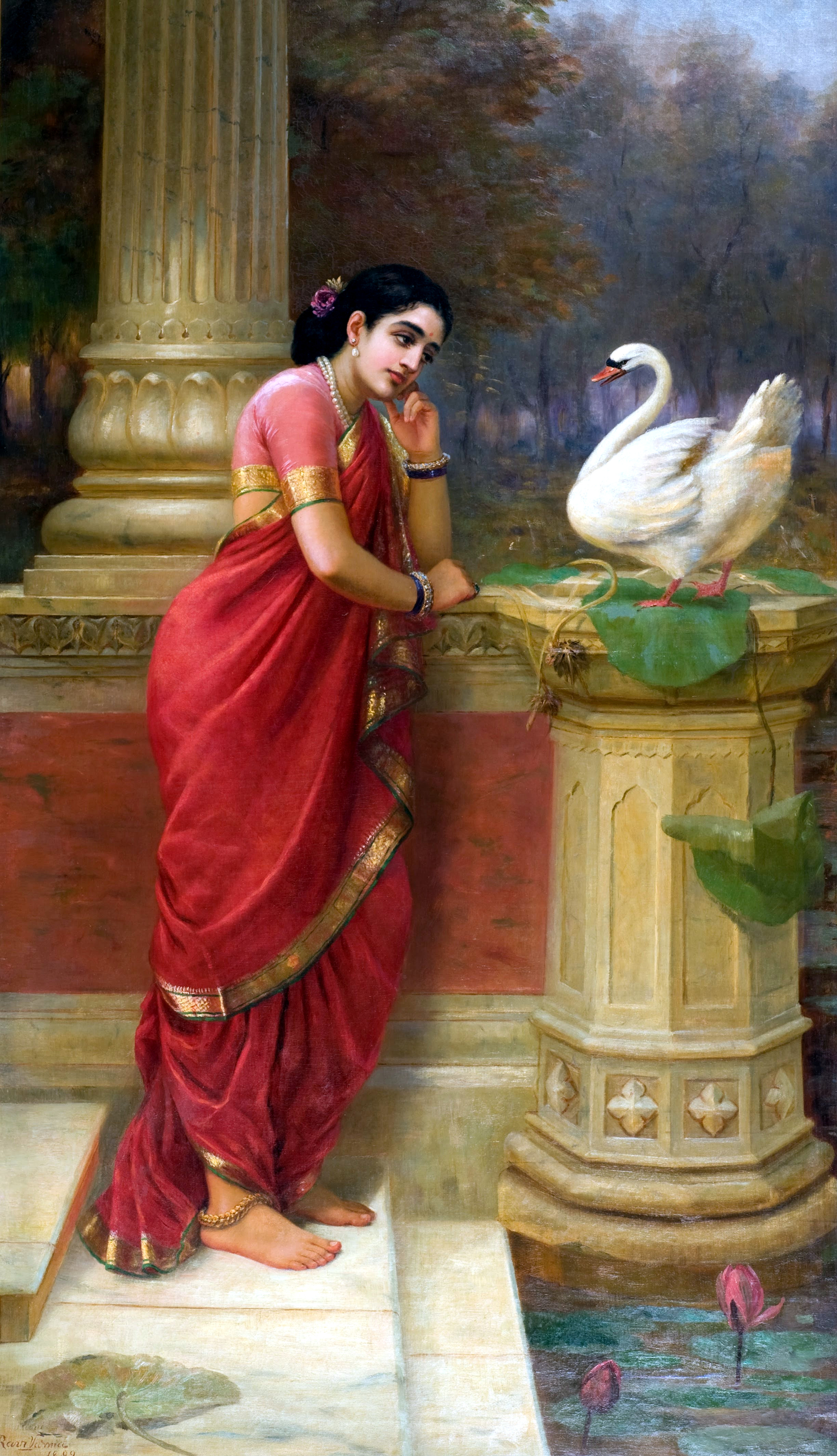
"Damayanthi"

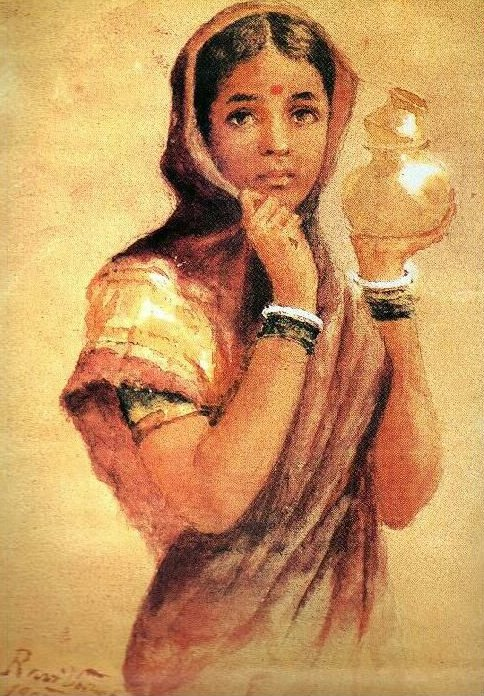
"Milkmaid"

Theyyam and Kathakali: Sivan said he received inspiration from the arts of his country: "We have a rich visual culture and even in Ananthabhadram, I have used certain aspects from Theyyam dancers and Kathakali to create the wizard Digambaran's image. The colour, long nails, kohl-lined eyes and so on were inspired from Theyyam and Kathakali." The sequence between Manoj K Jayan using Riya Sen as a channel for black magic, choreographed by Aparna Sindhoor, the dance director of the film, uses Kathakali movements in particular, which has been an inspiration for major Indian films like director Shaji Karun's Vanaprastham (1999) and director Adoor Gopalakrishnan's Kalamandalam Ramankutty Nair (2005).

Kalarippayattu: The film also used Kalarippayattu, the traditional martial art of South India, for the fight sequences between Digambaran and Chemban choreographed by action director Arash. Use of Kalari in the film followed the footsteps of Kalari-based movies like Palattu Koman (1962), Thacholi Othenan (1964), Kannappanunni (1977) and Oru Vadakkan Veeragatha (1989), as well as famous martial art film actor Jackie Chan's The Myth. After Asoka, it was the second time the director had used Kalari (as it is known in popular coinage).

Raja Ravi Varma: The director used three paintings of Raja Ravi Varma – Damayanti and the swan, Lady in thought and Girl carrying milk tray – as inspiration to picturize the song Pinakkamano (acted by Prithviraj Sukumaran and Kavya Madhavan; sung by M. G. Sreekumar and Manjari; choreographed by Aparna Sindhoor). Sivan said, "Yes, it is a tribute to Raja Ravi Varma, who is so intrinsically etched in every Malayali's mind." This song came in the wake of a renewed interest in Varma's work in Indian showbiz, as evidenced in Indian pop star Falguni Pathak's music video for the song "Meri Chunar Ud Ud Jaaye" (2001, acted by Trisha Krishnan) which emulated Varma's Shakuntala and Shaji Karun's declared film to be made on the artist's life which would feature Madhuri Dixit (actress of Gaja Gamini, a film by painter M.F. Hussain).

Pattanam Rasheed said about the make-up of the Pinakkamano sequence, "The skin tone I gave the characters is akin to an oil painting, orange-yellow shades, which give a painting-like look. That is why you feel that a painting is coming to life in some shots. The eye and eyebrow make-up is also different, according to the old styles in the paintings." Costumer Satheesh said, "Not one of the saris that Kavya wears is complete in itself. To get the colours of the body and border of the sari as close as possible to the ones in the paintings, I shopped in Chennai, Bangalore and Kochi. I had to attach the borders to some of the saris and dyed some to get the right shade... I had to rework all the jewels, with a few stones from one chain added to another." art director Sunil Babu points out that despite attempts at accuracy, in the Damayanthi scene, the swan is missing.

=== Pre-production ===
Sabu Cyril was originally scheduled to direct the film with actress Meera Jasmine in the lead. Production was delayed due to a strike in the Malayalam film industry in June 2004. Later, Cyril became busy with Shankar's film Anniyan. At this point, Santosh Sivan stepped in to replace Cyril. Cyril's assistant Sunil Babu art directed the film.

=== Filming ===
Like his earlier directorial ventures Asoka and The Terrorist (a.k.a. Malli), Santosh was also the cinematographer for Anandabhadram. Prithviraj, as the hero, had his biggest success of 2005, out of the five cinemas he did that year. Manoj K Jayan was to have a sannyasin look with long hair in the proposed Sabu Cyril version, but sported a more contemporary look in the version that was eventually shot, winning many critical accolades. The village and the tharavad/ancestral home shown in the movie was set in a village in Palakkad.

== Music ==
Anandabhadram

Soundtrack album by M.G. Radhakrishnan
- Released: 2005
- Genre: Feature film soundtrack
- Length: 28:52
- Producer: Sri Bhadra Pictures

Initially Sabu Cyril was the film director and Santhosh Sivan was the Cinematographer. Vidyasagar composed songs for the film penned by Sreekumaran Thampi. The songs were never recorded. After some months Sabu Cyril opted not to direct the film due to other reasons. And the film was taken over by Santosh Sivan who appointed M. G. Radhakrishnan for the film. Radhakrishnan went on to win Asianet Film Awards as the best music director for the film's tracks. He also did the score for Sivapuram, the Telugu version of the film. M. G. Sreekumar won Asianet Award as the Best Male Playback Singer for singing "Pinakkamano".

All lyrics are written by Gireesh Puthenchery; all music is composed by M.G. Radhakrishnan.

No.	Title	Singers	Length
1.	"Malamalalooya"	Kalabhavan Mani	3:27
2.	"Thiranurayum"	K. J. Yesudas	3:44
3.	"Shivamallikaavil"	K. S. Chithra	4:05
4.	"Pinakkamaano"	M. G. Sreekumar, Manjari Babu	4:15
5.	"Minnayam Minnum"	K. S. Chithra	2:21
6.	"Vasanthamundo"	M.G. Radhakrishnan, Hema	4:48

== Release ==
It is the first Malayalam feature screened using a satellite feed instead of conventional prints; aimed at an international market. it was also dubbed in Tamil, Telugu (as Sivapuram), and English. The release of Anandabhadram in India followed that of the horror movie Chandramukhi, starring Rajnikanth, which was a remake of the Malayalam film Manichitrathazhu, creating a brief success for the horror genre. The film was showcased in Osian's Cinefan Festival of Asian and Arab Cinema in 2006.

== Reception ==
Anandabhadram received critical acclaim for its screenplay, story, music, cinematography, cast performances and horror elements. Most of the critics especially praised Manoj K. Jayan's performance and the dark ambience of the movie. The film was average success. According to one of the producer of the film Maniyanpilla Raju, the film was released on the same day as Mammootty's blockbuster Rajamanikyam and could not compete with it.

The songs from the film, Pinakkamano, Thira Nurayam and Malama Lalooya, became the top hits among Malayalam film songs in 2005. The film also inspired director KJ Bose's Tanthra (2006) featuring actors Siddique and Shweta Menon. Sunil Babu, the art director, came to the notice of Kerala audience through the film, especially for his treatment for the Raja Ravi Varma inspired song, Pinakkamano.

=== Accolades ===
Anandabhadram won five awards in the Kerala State Film Awards for 2005, including Best Cinematography (Santosh Sivan), Best Music Direction (MG Radhakrishnan), Best Editing (Sreekar Prasad), Best Art Direction (Sunil Babu) and Best Makeup (Pattanam Rasheed). It won five awards in the Kerala Film Critics Association Awards 2005, including Best Film, Best Director (Santhosh Sivan), Best Actor (Manoj K Jayan), and Best Cinematography (Santhosh Sivan). M. R. Rajakrishnan had won the Amritha Fertanity Award for Best Audiography for his work in this film.

== See also ==
- List of Malayalam horror films
