= Motiroti =

Motiroti was a London-based arts organisation. It worked with collaborators in visual and live art, new technology and socially engaged practice, and created public art with the public itself being central to the making and shaping of the work, using emerging social technologies to incorporate multiple perspectives within artworks. The company fostered the development of a lifelong learning culture, with learning and art production part of the same process, and offered potent opportunities to inspire and develop a dynamic exchange between artists and communities.

== History ==
Motiroti means 'fat bread' in Urdu, and the company took its name from one of its earliest projects, Moti Roti Puttli Chunni - a playful examination of gender stereotypes, presented as live Bollywood musical theatre in east London. Co-founded by artists Ali Zaidi and Keith Khan, Motiroti was officially registered as a charity in 1996, although the pair had worked together since the late 1980s. Khan left the company in 2004 to become CEO of the Rich Mix Cultural Foundation. Ali Zaidi continued as the sole Artistic Director until 2012, when he left to establish his own freelance practice under the name of Ali Zaidi Arts. motiroti was thereafter led by Executive Director Tim Jones, who joined the company in 2010, and following its closure operates as an independent consultant and workshop designer, advising on the development of enterprise opportunities and digital capacity in the culture sector.

A catalogued archive of its work from the late 1980s up to 2005 is owned by Future Histories, the UK's first dedicated repository for African, Asian and Caribbean performing arts.

motiroti presented works in many countries, at venues such as Arnolfini Gallery, Bristol; Barbican Centre, London; Bonn Biennale; Brooklyn Academy of Music; Edinburgh Festival; Festival Iberoamericano de Teatro de Bogota; Greenwich Theatre; Harbour Front Centre, Toronto; Houston International Festival; Institute of Contemporary Arts, London; Ikon Gallery, Birmingham; It's Queer Up North, Manchester; Kannonhallen, Denmark; Krannert Center, Illinois; La Ferme du Buisson, France; Leeds Mela; London International Festival of Theatre; Lille 3000; Melbourne Festival; Midlands Arts Centre; Museum of Contemporary Art, Chicago; Museum of London; National College of Arts, Lahore; National Gallery, Cape Town; National Theatre, Islamabad; Natural History Museum, London; New Art Gallery, Walsall; New Haven Festival of Arts and Ideas; Notting Hill Carnival; Oval House Theatre, London; Queen Elizabeth Hall, London; REDCAT, Los Angeles; Romaeuropa Festival, Italy; Royal Albert Hall, London; Royal Court Theatre, London; Royal Festival Hall, London; Royal Geographical Society with IGB, London; Royal National Theatre, London; Science Museum, London; Serpentine Gallery, London; Sibikwa Theatre, Johannesburg; Singapore Arts Festival; Tamaseel Theatre, Lahore; Tate Liverpool; Tate Modern; Theatre Royal Stratford East; Tramway Theatre, Glasgow; V&A; Warwick Arts Centre; West Yorkshire Playhouse; Whitney Museum, New York.

== Productions ==
- Multiwalks' (2013–14) – a suite of artist-led creative walks through 3 city neighbourhoods (Vauxhall and Waterloo in London, England; Santa Croce in Reggio Emilia, Italy; Gronland and Bjorvika in Oslo, Norway). Developed by motiroti in partnership with Do Tank Studios, Mondinsieme and Oslo Intercultural Museum, Multiwalks is a free mobile app available on iOS and Google Play.
- Potluck: Chicago (2011-2012) - a residency process at Columbia College Chicago which drew upon art, food, design, urban planning, technology and social enterprise to offer a toolbox for making 'The Local' more vibrant.
- Streets of Gold (2012)- An installation at the Museum of London. Creatively directed by artist Daniel Saul, Streets of Gold offered a fresh vision of London through migrant eyes, and a reminder that cities are built on the dreams of successive newcomers.
- Journeys of Love and More Love (2009-2011) - A live film and media installation with edible interludes, co-production with Napoli Teatro Festival Italia, performed in Italian. Later shown at Lilian Baylis at Sadlers Wells in London in 2010. Presented at Art House within Melbourne Festival in October 2011 and at the National Museum of Singapore for its last iteration.
- 360° (2007–2010) – Bringing to light a rounded contemporary picture of the cultural dynamics between Britain, India and Pakistan. The three-year programme consists of 60x60 Secs, three international Arts Residency Labs and a new collaborative work.
- Priceless (2006) Priceless brought together high-profile art and science institutions together. A multi-site large-scale project involving video and graphic installations, road-shows, mobile units, guided tours to secret archives and major launch event in and around Exhibition Road. Commissioned by the Serpentine Gallery, Platform for Art and The Exhibition Road Cultural Group (Natural History Museum, Science Museum, Royal Geographical Society and V&A, Imperial College London, and Goethe-Institut London).
- Alladeen (2002–2005) – A co-production with The Builders Association which weaved between the ancient legend of Aladdin from 1001 nights and identity-blurring phenomena found in the teeming metropolises of Bangalore, London and New York.
- Celebration Commonwealth (2002) – A parade highlighting the Commonwealth of Nations and its contribution of peoples and cultures to the United Kingdom for Elizabeth II of the United Kingdom's Golden Jubilee Weekend.
- One Night (1997) – A piece of visual theatre exploring the shifts between Indian courtesan culture, first-generation British Asians and contemporary student life in the United Kingdom.
- Wigs of Wonderment (1995–1999) – A performance installation challenging the notions of beauty, objectification and the 'exotic' in Western culture.
- Maa (1995) – An audacious mix of odd mythic creatures, melodrama, snatches of film, towering carnival costumes and scratch animation.
- The Seed The Root (1995) – A series of site-specific installations and performances exploring gender and cultural imbalances, created in collaboration with local businesses in Brick Lane and international and British artists.
- Moti Roti, Puttli Chunni (1993–1994) – The United Kingdom's first Bollywood musical. Winner of Time Out Performance Award.
- Flying Costumes, Floating Tombs (1991) – An extravagant spectacle inspired by the Hosay Festival in Trinidad. Winner of Time Out Performance Award.

== Notable collaborators ==
Mina Anwar, Christophe Berthonneau, Sonia Boyce, dbox, Poulomi Desai,(https://aaa.org.hk/en/collections/search/library/priceless-68698) Shahram Entekhabi, Guillermo Gómez-Peña, Shobna Gulati, Pen Hadow, Indira Joshi, Isaac Julien, Akram Khan, Nusrat Fateh Ali Khan, Jamila Massey, Robin Rimbaud, Sunetra Sarker, Shri, Jasmine Simhalan, Talvin Singh, Nina Wadia, Benjamin Zephaniah. Nila Madhab Panda, Shalalae Jamil, Daniel Saul.

== External links on the UK web archive ==
- summary archive of Motiroti's work
- website for Alladeen, motiroti's OBIE award-winning multiplatform collaboration with the Builders' Association;
- 360° website, including links to sixty one-minute films created in India, Pakistan and the UK as the 60x60Secs project.
