= The Way of the Warrior =

The Way of the Warrior may refer to:

- Bushido ('the way of the warrior'), a Samurai moral code
- The Way of the Warrior (TV series), a 1983 BBC documentary series about Asian martial arts
- "The Way of the Warrior" (Star Trek: Deep Space Nine), a 1995 episode of the TV series
- Way of the Warrior, a 1994 video game
- Young Samurai: The Way of the Warrior, a 2008 children's novel by Chris Bradford
- The Way of the Warrior, a challenge from the 2002 Scottish TV game show Raven

== See also ==
- Path of the Warrior (disambiguation)
