= Simhalan Madhava Panicker =

Indian actor (1930–2004)

Kalari Gurukkal, Marma Adi Gurukkal Simhalan Madhava Panicker
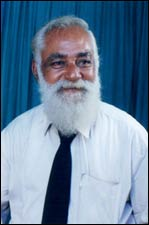
- Born: Kunhuvarkkypulla Simhalan; 1930; Cochin, Kerala, India (കൊച്ചി, കേരളം, ഇന്ത്യ)
- Died: 5 March 2004 (aged 73)
- Occupation(s): Dancer, martial artist, actor
- Website: Simhala Kalari

Simhalan Madhava Panicker (1930 – 5 March 2004) was an Indian martial artist and actor of film and theater. Born into a family of plantation farmers in Kerala in 1930, he left home at the young age of eight and traveled to all corners of India. He found his passion in martial arts and acting. He became an expert and authority in varma kalai, the art of hitting pressure points in Kalaripayattu.

Simhalan Panicker learned the northern and southern styles of Kalaripayattu during 18 years of training under many teachers, and specialized in varma kalari which he learned from Balan Gurukkal. From then on, he practiced the art, improvising and developing his own version of it. Using his background as a trained dancer, boxer and street fighter, he carried the art form into its highest level of expression. He created Simhala Kalari in 1975.

He was associated with contemporary martial artists like Chandrashekharan Gurukkal and Vallabhatta Vishwanathan Gurukkal. Notable disciples are Moses Thilak, Master Manoharan and Karate Mani.

Panicker was secretive about his varma kalari skills and has taught very few students, all of them renowned masters in southern India. In 1983 he was featured as a 'most dangerous man' in Chennai in The Way of the Warrior: Martial Arts and Fighting Styles from Around the World, a book that was the basis for a TV documentary released by the BBC which presents various martial art forms of the world.

Simhalan Panicker's interests extended beyond martial arts. He was also an actor of theater and film, with more than 175 movies to his credit. He taught at the Film and TV Institute of Chennai, Tamil Nadu.

He moved back to Kerala in 1998, where he continued practicing Simhala Kalari. He died in March 2004. His daughter Jasmine Simhalan is a noted Kalaripayattu practitioner and Silambam exponent living in the UK.

== See also ==
- University of Wisconsin–Madison
