= Jasmine Simhalan =

Indian martial artist and classical dancer

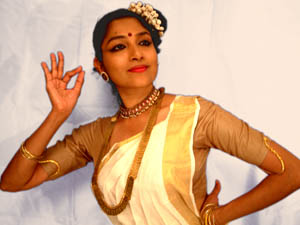
- Born: Jasmine Simhalan; 13 November 1970 (age 54); Chennai, India
- Occupation(s): dancer, martial artist, actress, movement analyst, choreographer
- Years active: 1988 – Present
- Title: Kalarippayattu Gurukkal
- Website: Official Jasmine Simhalan website

Jasmine Simhalan (born 13 November 1970) is an Indian martial artist and classical dancer. Her father, Simhalan Madhava Panicker, was a martial artist from Kerala. Simhalan is a Kalaripayattu gurukkal and an instructor in Silambam. Simhalan is a performer and choreographer based in the United Kingdom and India. Simhalan has been a part of physical theatre and Indian contemporary form of dance, theatre and martial art forms for the past twenty years.

== Career ==
Jasmine Simhalan performing Kalaripayattu

Since 1987, Simhalan has been part of most of the productions of the Indian Chandralekha (dancer) group (1988–1993) and Shobana Jeyasingh dance company (1993–2003) as a dancer and educational/workshop leader. At the same time, Simhalan has worked as a soloist and a choreographer. Simhalan has toured and performed in productions of Wayne McGregor (UK), Richard Alston (UK), Laurie Booth (UK), Roger Sinha (Canada), Mavin Khoo (UK), and was also part of the 2001 Basement Jaxx album and Emergency Exit Arts production RungaRung. In the summer of 2000, Simhalan both choreographed for and performed in the award-winning production, Coming of Age, directed by Keith Khan.

Simhalan's work in television and film includes Check by Amarjeeth Singh, and Away Game, a BBC production. Chathi (meaning cheat in Malayalam), her physical theatre choreography based on the warriors of Northern Ballads like Aromal Chekavar, Chathiyan Channthu etc. of 16th-century Kerala, has toured in the United Kingdom and Europe. Recently, she directed and performed Ghost, a street theatre act and video installation at the Somerset House. She art directed and performed SPILT, a video installation for London Mela. Football and Spare Rib were toured till end 2009 in South East Asia, Europe and the Americas. Currently, she runs awareness programmes across South India (setting up programmes for integrating good health through Kalaripayattu, yoga and pilates within the South Indian educational system as well as working closely with varied NGO's and government bodies).

Her recent award-winning collaborative work, produced by Builders Association New York in collaboration with Motiroti, London is a multimedia theatre work on global communication culture and arts.
