= Kalaripayattu in popular culture =

Kalaripayattu is an Indian martial art developed in present-day Kerala in the southwestern coast of the Indian subcontinent. It is featured in several films, television, literature, video games, comics and other media.

== Films ==
Year	Title	Language
1961	Unniyarcha	Malayalam
1962	Palattu Koman	Malayalam
1964	Thacholi Othenan	Malayalam
1972	Aromalunni	Malayalam
1974	Thacholi Marumakan Chanthu	Malayalam
1977	Kannappanunni	Malayalam
1978	Thacholi Ambu	Malayalam
1978	Ondanondu Kaladalli	Kannada
1977	Maamaankam	Malayalam
1982	Padayottam	Malayalam
1989	Oru Vadakkan Veeragatha	Malayalam
1990	Kadathanadan Ambadi	Malayalam
1992	Yoddha	Malayalam
1995	Thacholi Varghese Chekavar	Malayalam
1996	Indian	Tamil
2001	Asoka	Hindi
2002	Puthooram Puthri Unniyarcha	Malayalam
2005	The Myth	Chinese
2007	The Last Legion	English
2010	Mansara	Telugu
2011	7 Aum Arivu	Tamil
2011	Urumi	Malayalam
2012	Arjun: The Warrior Prince	Hindi
2013	Commando	Hindi
2016	Baaghi	Hindi
2016	Veeram	Malayalam-Hindi-English
2019	Junglee	Hindi
2019	Mamangam	Malayalam
2019	Athiran	Malayalam
2023	Spider-Man: Across the Spider-Verse	English

== Television ==
Year	Title	Network	Language	Notes
2004	Seven Deadly Arts with Akshay Kumar	National Geographic	English	Non-fiction miniseries
2006	Kenichi: The Mightiest Disciple	TV Tokyo	Japanese	Japanese manga series
2013–2019	Steven Universe	Cartoon Network	English	American series
2017–2018	Mahakali — Anth Hi Aarambh Hai	Colors TV	Hindi	
2017–2018	Kalari Kids	Amazon Prime Video	English, Hindi	

== Documentaries ==
- The Way of the Warrior on BBC

== Video games ==
- Ashwathama — The Immortal
- Soul Edge
- Death Battle
- Tekken

== Comics ==
- Agari (2019), Japanese manga.
- Odayan
- Odayan II – Yuddham
- Alita - Battle Angele

== Music videos ==
- Higher by Just Blaze and Baauer, featuring Jay-Z; directed by Nabil Elderkin.

== See also ==
- List of martial arts films
- Martial arts film
