= Path of the Warrior =

Path of the Warrior may refer to

- Shambhala: The Sacred Path of the Warrior, a book concerning the Shambhala Buddhist vision of Chögyam Trungpa
- Art of Fighting 3: The Path of the Warrior, a 1996 video game in the Art of Fighting series
- Path of the Warrior, a 2019 video game

== See also ==
- Warriors' Path State Park
- Warriors Path State Park
- Susquehanna Warrior Trail
- Great Indian Warpath
- Way of the Warrior (disambiguation)
