= Meenakshi Amma Gurukkal =

Indian Kalarippayattu practitioner

Meenakshi Amma
- Born: 1942 (age 83–84); Vadakara
- Citizenship: India
- Occupation: Kalarippayattu teacher
- Spouse: V. P. Raghavan
- Children: 4
- Awards: Padma Shri

Meenakshi Amma Gurukkal (born 1942) is an Indian martial artist known as a practitioner and teacher of Kalaripayattu, the traditional martial arts form of Kerala, India. In 2017, she received Padma Shri, India's fourth highest civilian award.

== Biography ==
Meenakshi Amma's family is from a Thiyya community in Vadakara, a town in northern Kerala. She was born at a time when physical education was compulsory. All the people in the area, regardless of gender, would go to Kalari (Kalarippayattu training centre) that day. At the behest of her father, Meenakshi Amma joined Raghavan Gurukkal's Kalari at the age of seven to study Kalarippayattu.

Meenakshi Amma's Kadathanadan Kalari started in the year 1949. Every year, 150-160 students learn the martial arts in her school Kadathanadan Kalari Sangam, where she is teaching for more than 56 years. Meenakshi Amma was introduced to Kalaripayattu at the age of seven under V P Raghavan Master, whom she married at the age of 17. After her husband's death in 2007, Meenakshi Amma took over the reins of the Kadathanattu Kalari Sangham established by her husband. She is well-versed in using all the weapons ranging from the stick to the urumi, which even the experts find difficult to master.

The Kalari, which is visited by many students even from abroad, still maintains the traditional value system. There is no fee for the classes and money is accepted in the form of dakshina and expenses for the oil used in Kalari.

Meenakshi Amma's family is also into Kalarippayattu. Her two sons and two daughters also started practicing Kalaripayattu from the young age of six. One of her sons is also a 'Gurukkal' (kalaripayattu teacher) now.

She is now performing as central character in a Kalaripayat centered movie named Look Back. The film is set to release in June next year.

== Personal life ==
Her husband V. P. Raghavan Gurukkal from Puthuppanam Karimpanapalam was her first Kalarippayattu trainer. The couple have 4 children.

== See also ==
- Kottackkal Kanaran Gurukkal
