= Kottackkal Kanaran Gurukkal =

Kalaripayattu Practitioner

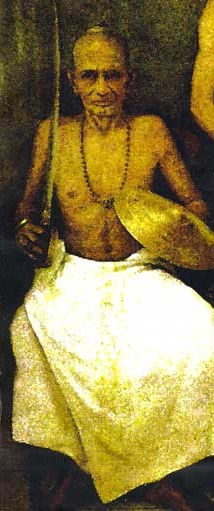

Kottackkal Kanaran Gurukkal (1850–1941), was a prominent Kalaripayattu Gurukkal (master) credited with the revival of Kalaripayattu following its decline due to the British ban on the martial art. Nearly 60% of existing Kalaris trace their lineage directly or indirectly to Kanaran Gurukkal. His significant role in preserving and revitalizing Kalaripayattu has earned him the title "Dronacharya of Kalaripayattu".He was born into the Chekavar Thiyyar Tharavad, a large Landlord family near Mukkali, Vadakara, Kozhikode. He remained unmarried and dedicated his entire life to the preservation and promotion of Kalaripayattu.

Kalaripayattu, a martial art from Kerala, was banned by the British in the aftermath of the Cotiote War, and as a result, the Kalaris and institutions that existed far and wide in Kerala declined. Kanaran Gurukal was an important person among the Kalaripayattu gurus who played an early role in the revival of the martial art of Kalaripayattu which was destroyed by the British rule. Despite being a trained kalari gurukkal and a big land owner, he started his journey to protect kalari at the age of forty, traveling to distant places in Kerala and Tulunadu to learn different styles of kalari that existed and at the verge of extinction, with a determination to protect it. In order to finance for this he has sold 260 acres of land. It is said that each time he returned to his home in Vadakara from his travels, land buyers would be waiting to purchase land from him, knowing that Kanaran Gurukkal would sell property to fund his next journey. He studied Sampradayams, Mantra Tantravidya, and Dhyana Seva under various gurus. He also mastered six distinct styles of Kalaripayattu, including Arapillakai, Otimurassery, Vattayanthiruppan, and Pillatangi, which he went on to teach to his discipless.

Later, after completing his training under various gurus, he arrived in Thiruvangat, Thalassery, at the age of 65 and established his own Kalari for the first time. This act of bravery by Kanaran Gurukkal took place at a time when few dared to revive Kalaripayattu, due to the constraints imposed by the ongoing British ban. He is also said to have demonstrated his martial prowess by defeating the army commanders of the Kurumbranad Raja, thereby proving his exceptional skills. C. V. Narayanan Nair, the founder of the renowned CVN Kalari, was one of his disciples.

== CVN Relationship with Kalari ==
In Malabar, CVN later took the lead in bringing Kalaripayattu to the people from inside Kalari. CV Narayanan Nair, the founder of CVN Kalaris, was an important disciple of the Kanaran Gurus at Kottayam. CVN Narayanan Nair studied Abhyasamurahs from Kanaran Gurus and later it can be pointed out the main role of Kanaran Gurus in the establishment and development of Kalari. Kanaran Gurus disclosed their entire knowledge to C.V.
