= Keith Khan =

English artist (born 1963)

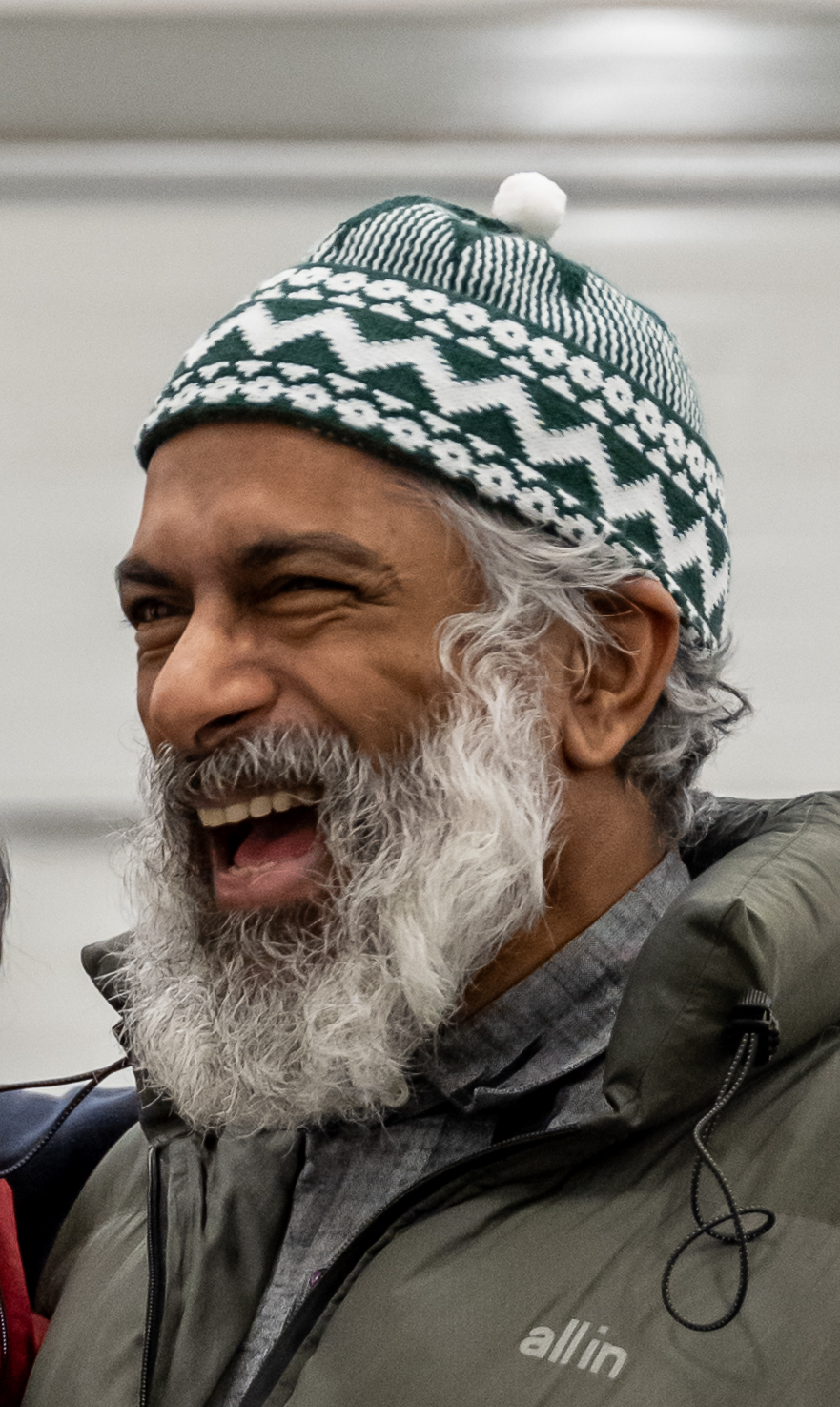
Designer Keith Khan, LEEDS 2023 (cropped)

Keith Khan (born 1963, Wimbledon) is an English artist, designer and performance artist. In 1996, together with Ali Zaidi, he co-founded the arts organisation Motiroti.

== Life ==
Khan studied fine art / sculpture at Middlesex University. Until 2004, most of the artistic events with which Khan was directly involved were under Motiroti, which produced projects such as Flying costumes, Floating Tombs (1991) which won the Time Out Dance and Performance Award; Queen's Golden Jubilee Commonwealth Celebrations (2002) and Alladeen (2004) which won the Village Voice OBIE Award Special Citation, co-produced by The Builders Association. Khan departed from Moti Roti in 2004 and has filled a number of senior executive positions since then, most notably, Head of Culture and then Artistic Executive to the 2012 Summer Olympics (2007 to 2009) and sitting on the panels of high-profile funding bodies, including the Wellcome Trust and as a Council Member of the Arts Council of England. Keith Khan is also a member of the Advisory Panel of Art on the Underground and was the Costume and 3D Designer for the Opening Ceremony for the Central and Opening Show at the Millennium Dome (2000); Director of Design for the 2002 Commonwealth Games ceremonies under the direction of David Zolkwer. Chief Executive of Rich Mix (2004 to 2007); Chair of Diversity Group for Creative Economy Programme Working Group (2006) and has been a member of the Commonwealth Group on Culture and Development since 2009.

== Controversy ==
Rich Mix – Khan resigned amid questions of leadership and cost controlling. Karen Bartlett wrote in The Times ""Keith was not a natural cost controller, but the board was also weak". Overstaffing, disputes between builders and architects with some funders temporarily withholding revenue in 2007 until a new business plan could be agreed. Khan did not want to comment on Rich Mix for this article."

London 2012 – While in his role as Head of Culture, Khan was criticised by some commentators for being excessively "anti-elitist". He was commended by others for trying to make the Arts more relevant to young people across the UK.

== Interviews ==
- Review of the theatre piece "A midsummer night dream" with Keith Khan for the Victoria and Albert Museum
- Interview with Keith Khan on Culture and Diversity from the 2009 Commonwealth People's Forum
- Interview with Keith Khan for the Trinidad & Tobago Express entitled "The time is right for the Caribbean region..."

== Talks ==
- "Culture as Catalyst" talk, Ministry of Tourism, Trinidad & Tobago, October 2009
- Monitoring Scenography 3: "Olympic Scenography – The Opening Ceremonies of the Olympic Games", October 2009
- Frame by Frame, "A symposium on the dance of Indian cinema and its transition into Bollywood dancing", July 2009
- Intercultural Cities Conference, May 2008
- "Leading Voices" talk on cultural diversity and the art of making creative cities, Australia Council for the Arts, 10 April 2008
- African and Asian Heritage, Legacy and Leadership, February 2008
- No Man's Land: Exploring South Asianness, May 2004
