= Sankaranarayana Menon =

Indian Kalarippayattu practitioner (1929–2023)

- Born: Sankaranarayana Menon Chundayil; 15 February 1929; Niramarutur, Malabar district, British India
- Died: June 6, 2023 (aged 94); Chavakkad
- Citizenship: India
- Occupation: Kalarippayattu teacher
- Spouse: Soudamini Amma
- Children: 4
- Parents: Sankunni Panicker (father); Kalyanikutti Amma (mother)
- Awards: Padma Shri, Kerala Folklore Academy Gurupooja Award

Sankaranarayana Menon (February 15, 1929 – June 6, 2023) popularly known as Unni Gurukkal was a Kalaripayattu gurukkal or teacher from Chavakkad, Kerala, India. For his contributions in the field of Kalaripayattu, he has won several noted awards including Kerala Folklore Academy Award and India's fourth highest civilian honor Padma Shri.

== Biography ==
Menon was born in 1929 on 15 February, to Mudavangattil Sankunni Panicker and Chundayil Kalyanikutti Amma, in a family of Kalaripayat experts at Niramaruthur near Tirur in present-day Malappuram district of Kerala. In 1955, family came to Chavakkad in Thrissur district. His family were traditional leaders of the army of the king of Vettathunadu in Malabar. In 1957, the family established a Kalarippayattu school called Vallabhatta Kalari in Chavakkad.

At the age of six, Menon started learning Kalaripayattu from his father Sankunni Panicker. He made his debut at Mudavangad Kalari at the age of fourteen. He became a Kalari gurukkal (teacher) at the age of 16.

Unni Gurukkal spread Kalaripayattu, an Indian martial art from Kerala, outside India and started branches of his Kalaripayattu school in countries such as the United States, United Kingdom, United Arab Emirates, France and Belgium. His team, which has performed Kalaripayattu in over 50 countries, also performed Kalaripayattu during Indian Prime Minister Narendra Modi's visit to Dubai.

He died on June 6, 2023.

=== Personal life ===
His wife Soudamini Amma is from Malappuram, from the Ozhur Kozhissery Punnakal family. Menon married Saudamini, at the age of 33. Their sons Krishnadas Gurukkal, Rajan Gurukkal and Dineshan Gurukkal are also Kalaripayattu practitioners. He has also a daughter.

== Awards and honors ==
- Padma Shri 2022
- Kerala Folklore Akademi Gurupooja Award 2019
- Kerala Kalamandalam Silver Jubilee Award
- Nehru Yuvakendra Award
- Suvarnamudra Award
- Indian Kalaripayattu Association Lifetime Achievement Award
- Then Kerala Governor P. Sathasivam honored Unni Gurukkal on National Sports Day
