= Mukkali, Kozhikode =

Mukkali (മുക്കാളി)
- Village
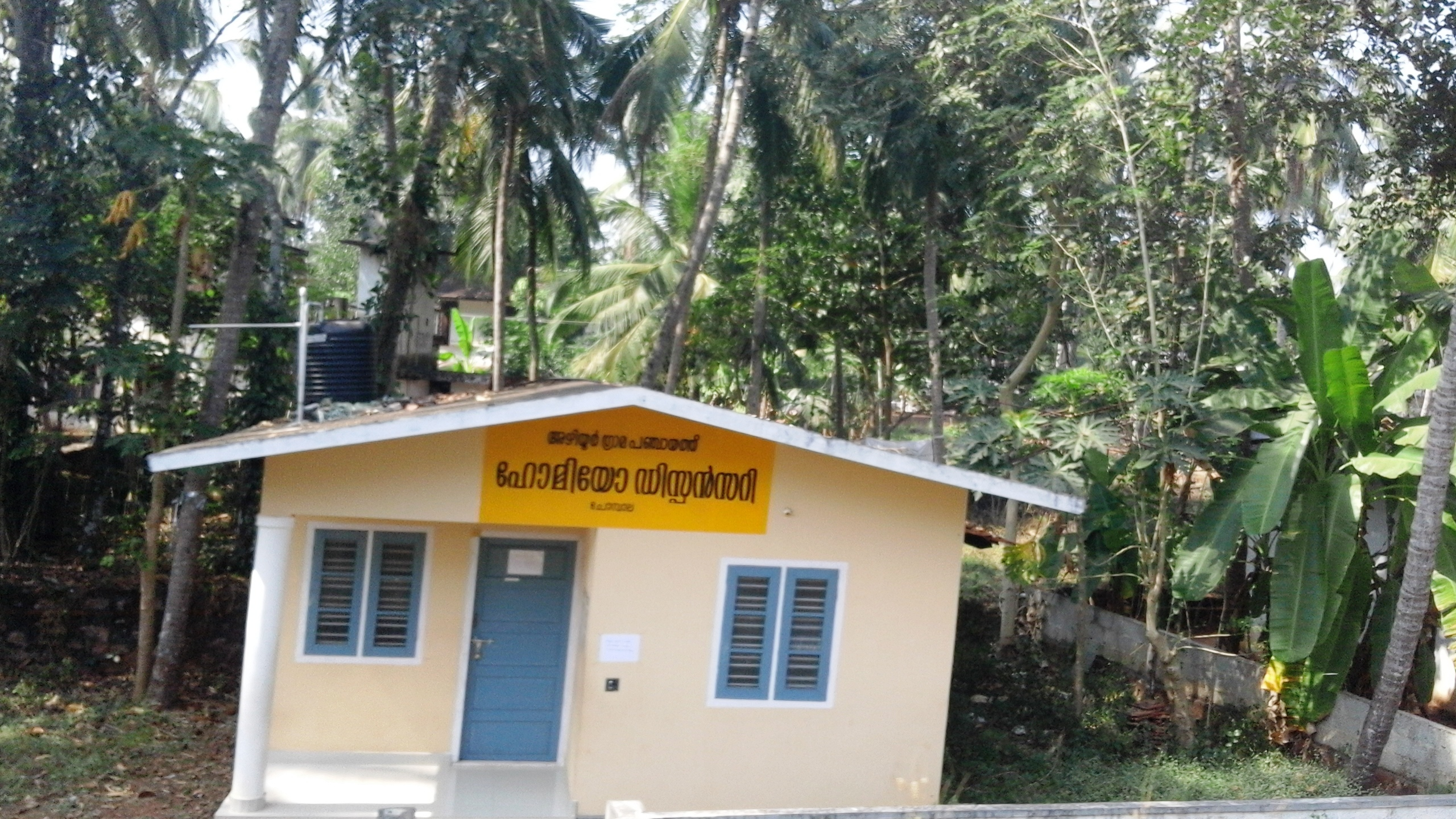
- Homeo Clinic at Mukkali
- Interactive map of Mukkali (മുക്കാളി)
- Coordinates: 11.66955°N 75.55740°E
- Country: India
- State: Kerala
- District: Kozhikode

Mukkali is a small village in Kozhikode District, Kerala, India.

== Location ==
Mukkali is located 56 km north of the district headquarters of Kozhikode.

== Transportation ==
Mukkali village connects to other parts of India through Vatakara city on the west and Kuttiady town on the east. National Highway 66 passes through Mukkali and the northern stretch connects to Mangalore, Goa, and Mumbai. The southern stretch connects to Cochin and Trivandrum. The eastern Highway going through Kuttiady connects to Mananthavady, Mysore, and Bangalore. The nearest airports are at Kannur and Kozhikode. The nearest railway station is at Vatakara. There is a small railway station at Mukkali serving passenger trains.

== See also ==
- Mukkali railway station

== Gallery ==
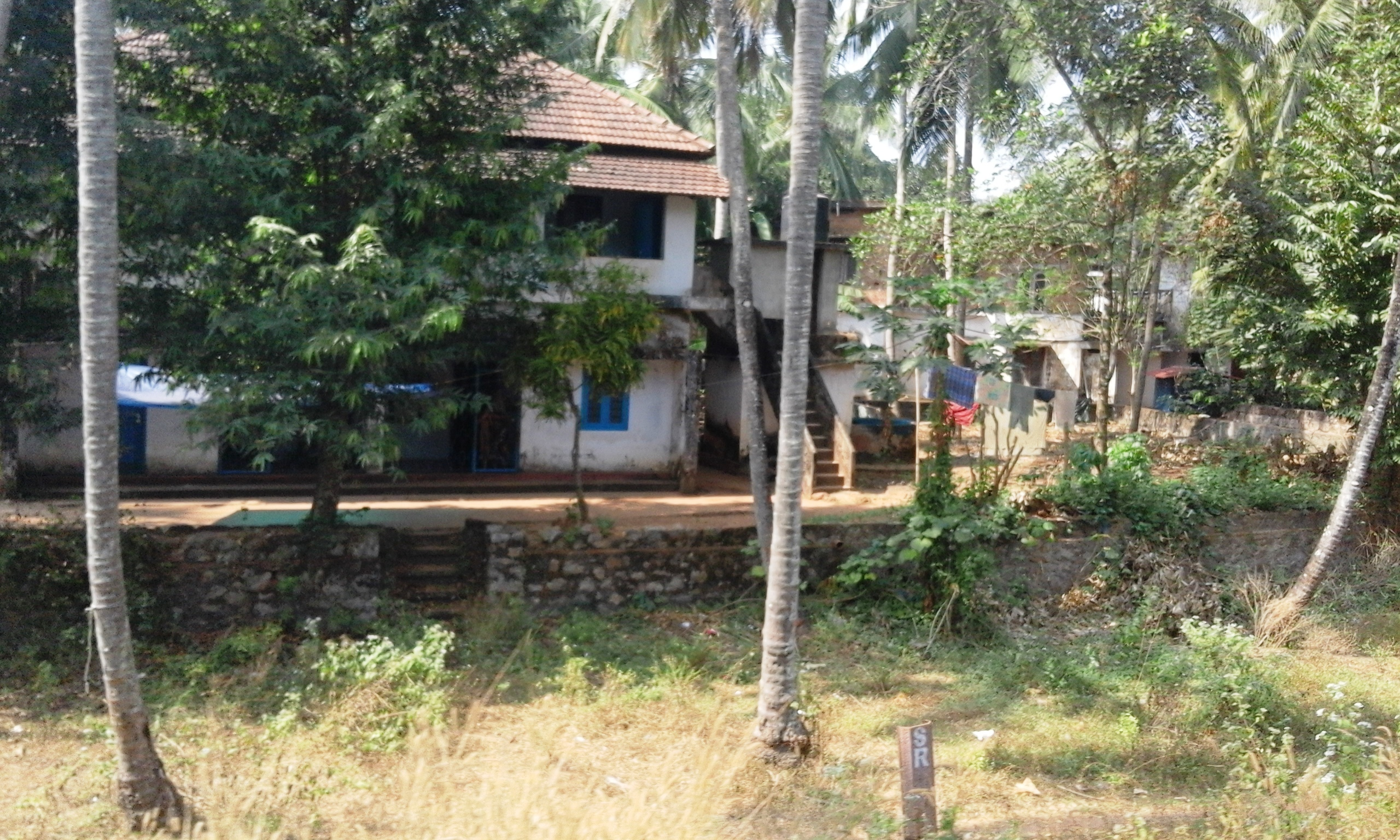
Village House

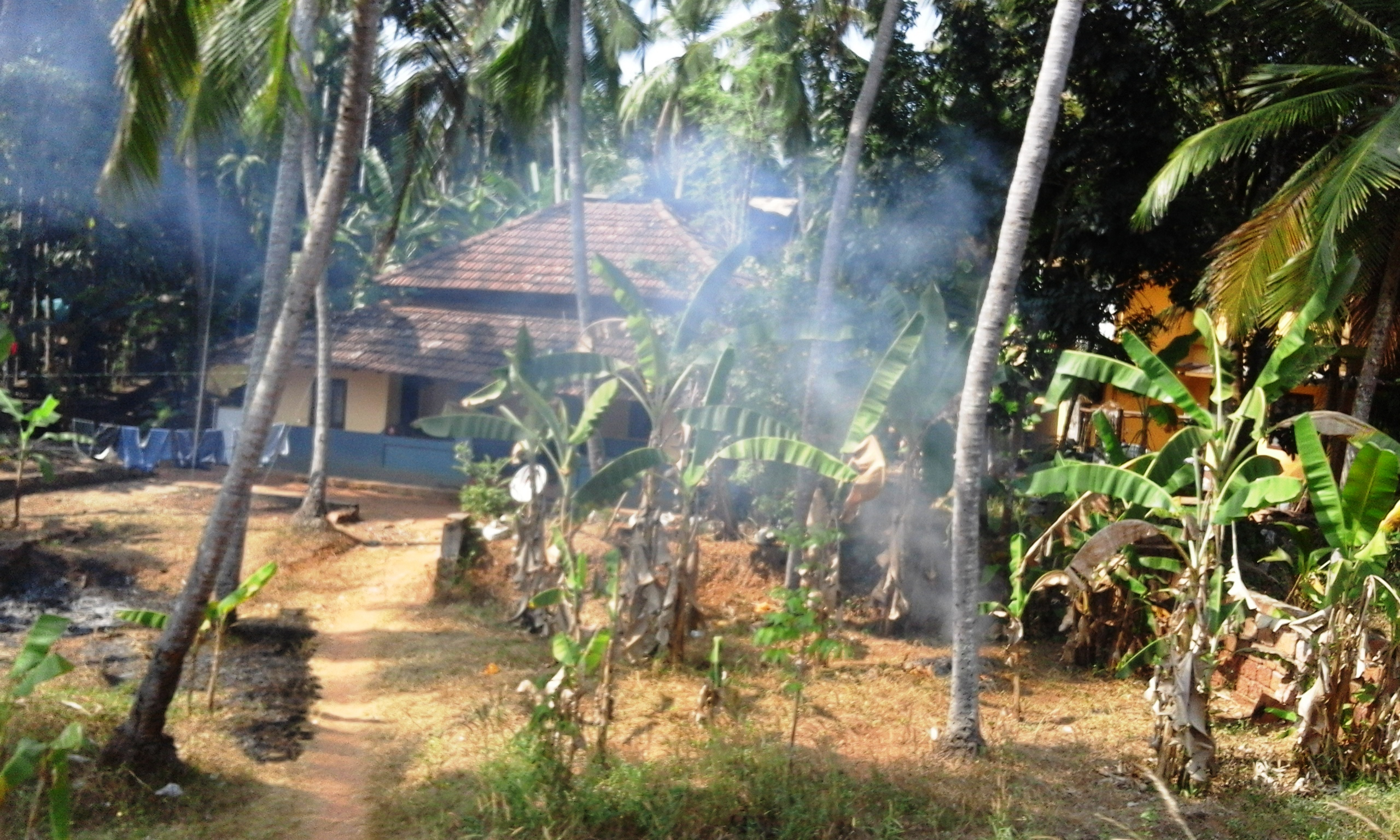
Smoking village
