= Vasundhara Doraswamy =

Vasundhara Doraswamy (born 1949) is the founder and director of Vasundhara Performing Arts Centre, Mysore (India). She is a Bharatanatyam dancer, choreographer, and guru (teacher). She is also one of the disciples of the late Shri Pattabhi Jois in the discipline of Ashtanga (vinyasa) yoga and has developed her own subdomain in Vasundhara Style.

== Early life ==
Born in Moodabidri, in South Canara (Karnataka) to P. Nagaraj and Smt.Varada Devi, Vasundhara made her acquaintance with Bharatanatyam at the age of 4 under the guidance of Muralidhar Rao and won a gold medal at the age of 5 at the state level competition. This highlighted her potential and prompted her parents to seek out the supervision of late Shri Rajaratnam Pillai, the student of Pandanallur Meenakshi Sundaram Pillai, who continued in the role of her Guru. Vasundhara, through her dedicated training, claimed 1st rank in Vidwath Examination conducted by Karnataka Secondary Education Board and claimed three consecutive gold medals. She was married to Late Sri H.S. Doraswamy and has a son who lives in Australia with her daughter-in-law Meghala Bhat Hirasave continuing in her tradition running Art of Vinyasa school of dance. Meghala is also the secretary for FIMDV (Federation of Indian Music & Dance Victoria) in Melbourne.

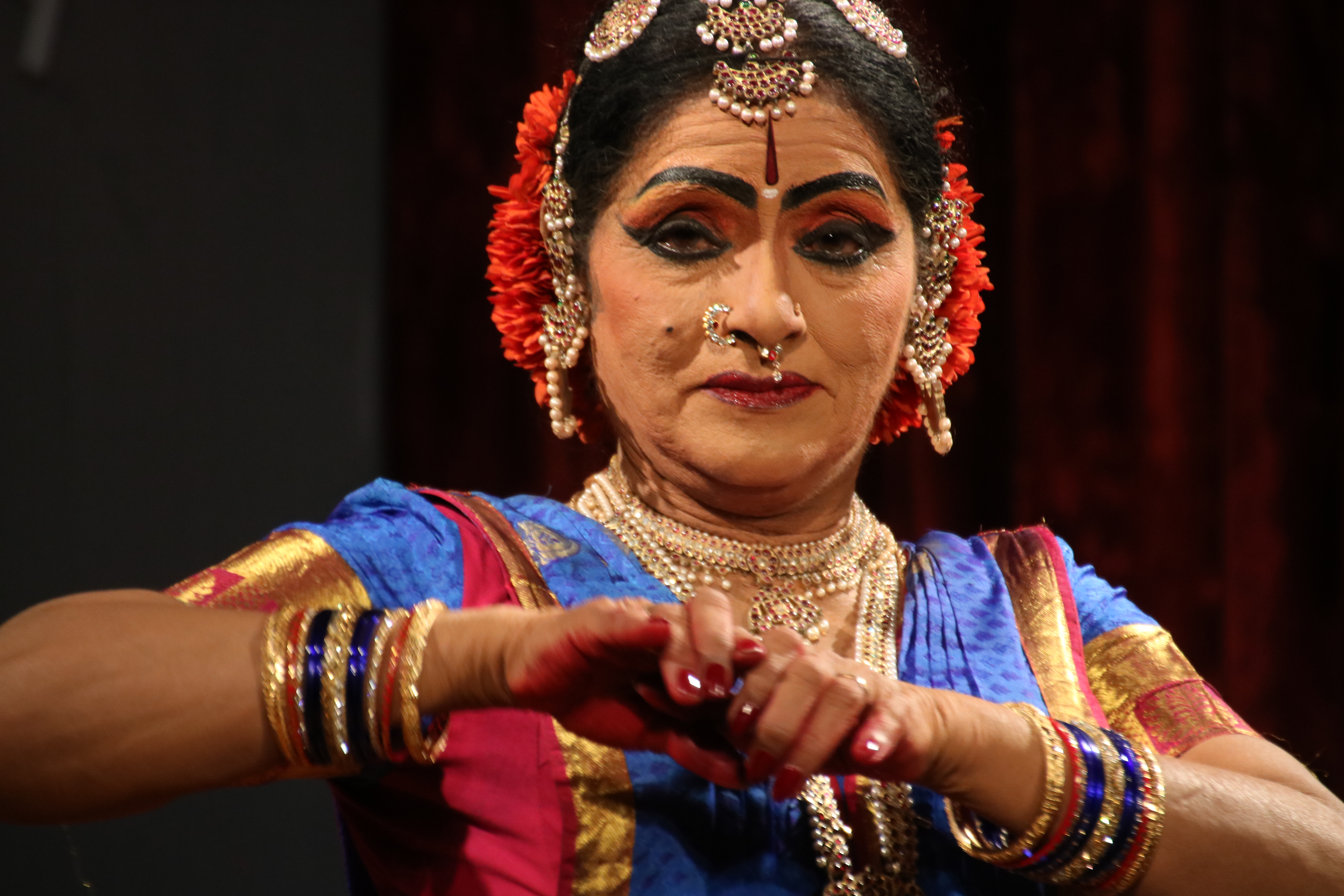
Vasundhara Doraisawmy

== Career ==
In 1988 Vasundhara earned a Ph.D. for her study on the correlation between Yoga and Bharatanatyam. She holds a postgraduate degree in folklore and is a consummate exponent of the martial arts of ‘Tang-ta’ and ‘Kalaripayattu’ that vouches for her quest for a multidisciplinary approach to dance. Vasundhara has released a treatise on the correlation of Yoga and Dance called "Natya Yoga Darshana".

As for her choreographies, `Panchali` is noted for its singular adaptation of Yakshagana music (a form of folk music from the State of Karnataka) to Bharatanatyam. Solo productions like Ganga Lahari, Ambe, Dakshayani, Panchali, Shakunta Kunjana (literary masterpieces of Udyavara Madhava Acharya) and now Jyothi Shankar's Kshaatra Draupadi –with a strong female oriented theme have won acclaim.

She is the only Bharatanatyam dancer to have been invited from India to perform for ‘WORLD PEACE’ conference in Paris under aegis of UNESCO before an audience of 2500 representing 137 countries.

Vasundhara was awarded the Central Sangeet Natak Academy Award for the year 2019.

Vasundhara was honoured with "Shantala Natya Sri Award" -The highest State Award for Dance by the Karnataka State Government and the Rajyotsava Award [Karnataka State]. She is the youngest recipient of the "Karnataka Kala Tilak", the prestigious award from the Karnataka Sangeetha Nrithya Academy, to date and also the only recipient of "Aasthaana Nritya Ratna" from Shri Krishna Mutt, Udupi. She has also been honoured with "Chandana Award" by Doordarshan India, "Shreshta Kala Pracharak" from Padma Bushan Saroja Vaidyanathan (New Delhi), "Kala Vipanchi" by Padma Vibushan Shri Balamurali Krishna (Chennai), Natya Jyothi [Australia] and Artist of the Millennium Award [USA], just to name a few.

An A-Graded artist in Doordarshan

Vasundhara regularly performs and conducts workshops in Bharatanatyam and Yoga globally. She has conducted summer camps for Bharatiya Vidya Bhavan in the UK. She has travelled to the Czech Republic, Poland, France, Germany, United Kingdom and Austria representing the ICCR [Indian Council for Cultural Relations]. Vasundhara's current tours are primarily based in the US, Singapore, Paris and Australia. Vasundhara is a visiting guest professor at Alabama University in the US. For the past 15+ years she has made Louisville her home every summer and has been conferred with the "Honorary Citizen of Louisville" and "Lifetime Achievement Award" in 2012 by The Mayor of Louisville, USA recognizing her contribution to the art field of Louisville.

=== Vasundhara Performing Arts Centre ===
Vasundhara has established a performing arts centre in Mysore, which has been conducting 4 classic music and dance festivals in Pallavotsava, Natarajotsava, Parangotsava and Chiguru Sange each year for the past 25 years.

=== Vasundhara Style ===
Vasundhara gained her initial training in Pandanallur Style of Bharathanatyam. She has been acclaimed for having brought a unique style to the dance form, and has been praised by the dance fraternity and art connoisseurs alike.

As a Guru, Vasundhara has trained three generations of disciples who have imbibed her every move, look (Drishti) and nuances needed etc. in the way they perform.

What inspired Vasundhara to experiment with the boundaries of the classical dance of Bharatanatyam was supposed to have been her strong footing in Yoga and experience of martial arts. Her use of singular hastas, alluring gaits, abhinaya which can communicate easily with the common man, modifications of the adavus, aharya, inimitable feather-touch footwork, all within the traditional framework, have led to a unique footprint that is today identified and recognized as "Vasundhara Style".

== Book ==
Vasundhara's biography 'Vasundhara: Odyssey of a Dancer' by professor G.S. Paul was released during her 70th Birthday celebrations on 11 January 2019 in Mysore.

'Orbit Of Vasundhara: Realm Of Dance's Truth' in English and 'Gejje Uluhina Naduve nrutyasatya:Vasundhara samvada' in Kannada both written by Vid.Shubhada Subramanyam was released on 15 November 2024 in Mysore during the 10 day International Dance and Music Festival 'Vasundharotsava 2024' also marking her 75th Birthday celebrations.
