= The Way of the Warrior (TV series) =

1983 BBC documentary series

- Genre: Documentary
- Narrated by: Dennis Waterman
- Country of origin: United Kingdom
- Original language: English
- No. of series: 1
- No. of episodes: 8

Original release
- Release: 11 May – 29 June 1983

The Way of the Warrior is an eight-part 1983 BBC documentary series about Asian martial arts. The series is narrated by Dennis Waterman.

== Episodes ==
No.	Title	Martial art	Original release date
1	Shorinji Kempo: The New Way	Shorinji kempo	11 May 1983
2	Kalari: The Indian Way	Kalari	18 May 1983
3	Aikido and Kendo: The Sporting Way	Aikido and kendo	25 May 1983
4	T'ai Chi: The Soft Way	T'ai chi	1 June 1983
5	Eskrima: The Filipino Way	Eskrima	8 June 1983
6	Karate: The Way of the Empty Hand	Karate	15 June 1983
7	Kung Fu: The Hard Way	Kung fu	22 June 1983
8	The Samurai Way	Iaijutsu	29 June 1983
