= Kalaripayattu =

Indian martial art from Kerala

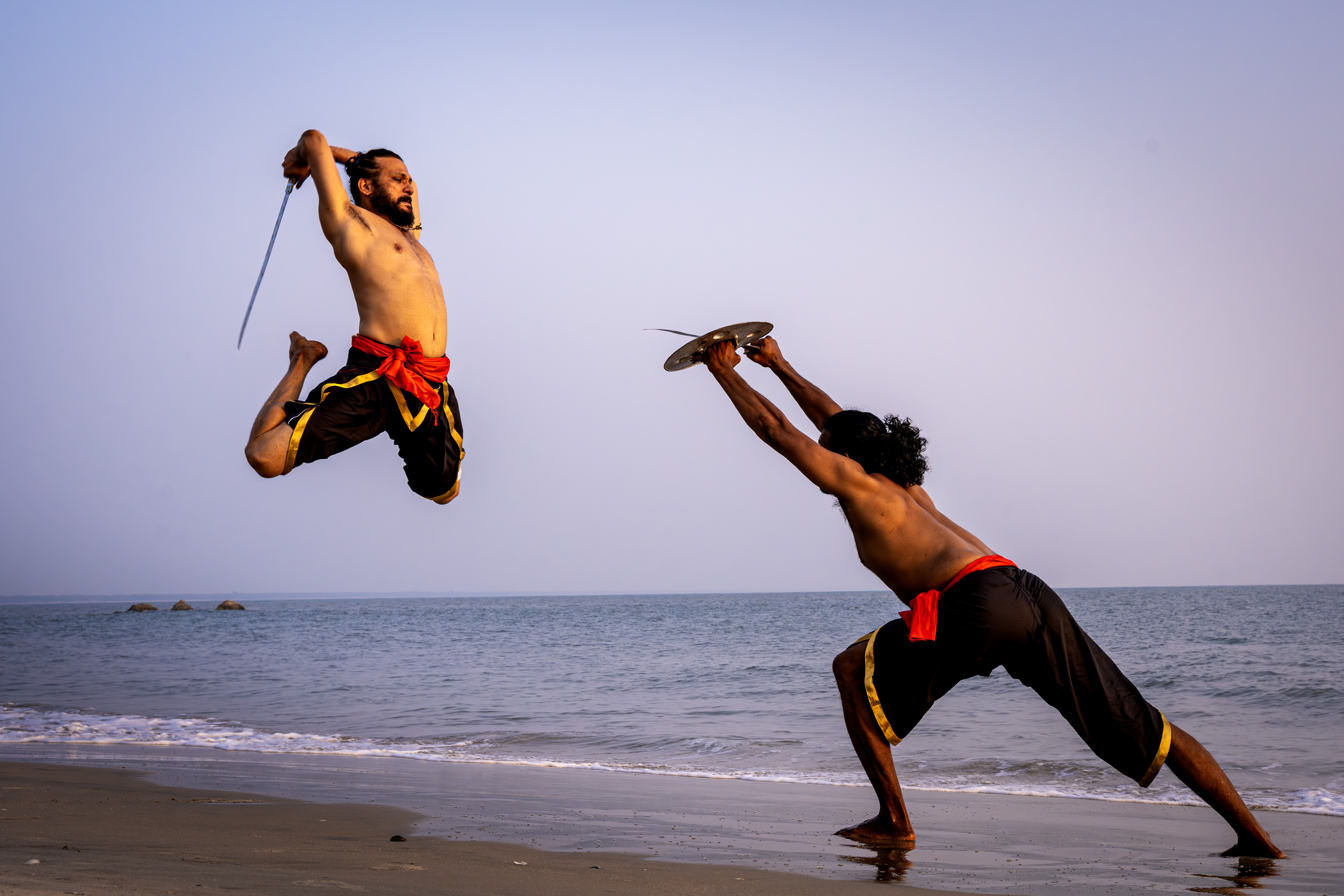
- Also known as: Kalari, Kalarippayattu, Kalari Payat
- Focus: Hybrid
- Hardness: Full-contact, semi-contact
- Country of origin: India
- Creator: Parashurama (as per legend) (Note: Parashurama: Green (2001, p. 225): "According to oral and written tradition, the warrior-sage Parasurama, who was the founder of Kerala, is also credited with founding of the first kalari and subsequent lineages of teaching families."; Zarrilli (1998, p. 31): "By oral and written tradition, sage Parasurama is believed to be the founder of the art and the first kalari.")
- Famous practitioners: Notable Kalaripayattu practitioners
- Olympic sport: No
- Meaning: "Practice in the arts of the battlefield"

Kalaripayattu (Malayalam: [kɐɭɐɾipːɐjɐtːɨ̆]), also known simply as Kalari, is an Indian martial art that originated in modern-day Kerala during the 11th–12th centuries CE.

== Etymology ==
Kalaripayattu is a martial art which developed out of combat techniques of the 11th–12th century battlefield, with weapons and combative techniques that are unique to Kerala. The word Kalaripayattu is a combination of two Malayalam words – kalari (training ground or battleground) and payattu (training of martial arts), which is roughly translated as "practice in the arts of the battlefield." Kalari may also be derived from the Malayalam or Sanskrit term Khaloorika, which is the name of a goddess associated with Shaktism who is worshipped in Kalaripayattu.

The Kamika Agama 5th century CE South Indian ancient text from the Shaiva Agama tradition, discusses the construction of the Khaloorika as a place for military exercise.

== History ==
=== Associations with Indian folklore and legends ===
According to legend, Parashurama, the sixth avatar of Vishnu, learned the art from Shiva, and taught it to the original settlers of Kerala shortly after bringing Kerala up from the ocean floor. A song in Malayalam refers to Parashurama's creation of Kerala, and credits him with the establishment of the first 108 kalaris throughout Kerala, along with the instruction of the first 21 Kalaripayattu gurus in Kerala on the destruction of enemies.

According to another legend, Ayyappa, a war deity from Kerala, learned Kalaripayattu in the Cheerappanchira Kalari in Muhamma.

=== Early history ===
According to Philip Zarrilli, the Dravidian combat techniques of the Sangam period (600 BCE – 300 CE) and Sanskritic Dhanur Vedic traditions were the earliest precursors to Kalaripayattu. Each warrior in the Sangam era received regular military training in target practice, horse and elephant riding. They specialized in one or more of the important weapons of the period including the spear (vel), sword (val), shield (kedaham), and bow and arrow (vil ambu).

=== Late medieval period (c. 1100 CE – c. 1500 CE) ===
According to Zarrilli, Kalaripayattu has been practiced "since at least the twelfth century" CE. During the 11th century, the second Chera kingdom fought a century-long war with the Chola kingdom, which ended with disintegration of the Chera kingdom. During this period, military combat training was compulsory, and according to Elamkulam Kunjan Pillai, Kalaripayattu took shape in this period. According to historian A. Sreedharan Menon, Kalaripayattu was among the most important aspects of feudal Keralite society, as it helped impart military training and Spartan-like discipline amongst the youth of Kerala, irrespective of caste, community or sex.

Each village in late medieval Kerala had its own kalari, which contained a presiding deity known as Bhagavathy or Paradevata. Children in Kerala who finished their education in local schools would join their local kalari to receive further military training. This was especially common amongst martial sects of various communities in Kerala, such as the Nairs and Thiyyars. The local legendary poems of Kerala, popularly known as Vadakkan Pattu, have been passed down through oral tradition and describe the deeds of warriors, indicating the practice of Kalarippayattu. These ballads, dating back as early as the 12th century, depict a social system in which every youth was required to undergo martial training.

In the late medieval period Kalaripayattu extended into the Kerala practice of ankam ("combat" or "battle" in Malayalam) as a way to settle disputes that could not be settled by local governmental assemblies. A variant of ankam, called poithu was also practiced, and was a duel between two individuals. Combatants participating in ankam or poithu used Kalaripayattu, and the combatants were given up to 12 years to prepare and train prior to the ankam itself, so that all combatants could achieve the highest level of proficiency with Kalaripayattu traditional weaponry. In some cases, professional mercenaries trained in Kalaripayattu were paid to engage in ankam on the behalf of others.

=== Early modern and colonial period (c. 1500 – c. 1900 CE) ===
==== Descriptions by Europeans ====
The route followed in Vasco da Gama's first voyage (1497–1499)

In 1498, a Portuguese fleet under Vasco da Gama discovered a new sea route from Europe to India, which paved the way for direct Indo-European commerce. The next to arrive were the Dutch, with their main base in Ceylon. They established ports in Malabar. Following the Dutch came the British, who established the port of Surat in 1619.

Duarte Barbosa, a Portuguese explorer who visited Kerala in the 16th century, noted that the physical exercise complexes of the Nairs and Thiyyars created a network of martial culture in Malabar, created a network of martial culture in Malabar, and wrote about Nair military training in Kalaripayattu:

The more part of Nayars (Nairs), when they are seven years of age, are sent to schools, where they are taught many tricks of nimbleness and dexterity; there they teach them to dance and turn about and to twist on the ground, to take royal leaps and other leaps and this they learn twice a day as long as they are children and they become so loose jointed and supple and they make them turn their bodies contrary to nature; and when they are fully accomplished in this, they teach them to play with the weapon they are most inclined, some play with bows and arrows, some with poles to become spearmen, but most with swords and are ever practising. The Nayars (Nairs) are bound, however old they may be, to always go (for training) in the winter (the rainy season or monsoon season) to take their fencing lessons until they die.

Hendrik van Rheede, governor of Dutch Malabar between 1669 and 1676, wrote about Chekavar training in Kalaripayattu in Hortus Malabaricus:

Chekavas (Thiyyar warriors) are bound to war and arms. The Chekavars usually serve to teach Nayros (Nair) in the fencing in kalari school.

==== Decline ====
The widespread practice and prevalence of Kalaripayattu in Kerala began to decline in the 17th century, when the usage of guns and cannons became widespread. This also coincided with the European invasions into Kerala, after which, firearms began to surpass the usage of traditional weaponry such as swords and spears.

The late medieval "golden age" of Kalaripayattu is preserved in the Vadakkan Pattukal (17th–18th century), a collection of ballads about warrior heroes and heroines from earlier periods in Kerala, such as Aromal Chekavar (16th century), Chandu Chekavar (16th century), Unniyarcha (16th century), and Thacholi Othenan, who were celebrated for their martial prowess, chivalry and idealism. The heroes and heroines belong mainly to two matrilinear families, one of Tiyya origin and another Nair. In the Vadakkan Pattukal, it is stated that the cardinal principle of Kalaripayattu was that knowledge of the art be used to further worthy causes, and not for the advancement of one's own selfish interests.

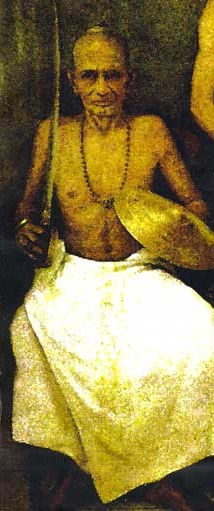
Kottackkal Kanaran Gurukkal (1850–1941), also known as the "Dronacharya of Kalaripayattu"

In 1804, the British banned Kalaripayattu in Kerala in response to the Kottayathu War, a rebellion against British rule in Kerala led by the Keralite king Pazhassi Raja. The ban came into effect shortly after Pazhassi Raja's death on November 30, 1805, resulting in the closure of most of the major kalari training grounds in Kerala. Following the ban, many Keralite gurukkals of Kalaripayattu resisted the ban and continued to teach Kalaripayattu to their students in secret. Gurukkals such as Kottackkal Kanaran Gurukkal, Kelu Kurup Gurukkal and Maroli Ramunni Gurukkal, learned and preserved the martial art for posterity and were responsible for preserving Kalaripayattu into the beginning of the twentieth century, as well as sparking the revival of Kalaripayattu in Kerala in the 1920s.

=== Resurgence in modern times (20th–21st century) ===
The resurgence of public interest in Kalaripayattu began in the 1920s in Thalassery, as part of a wave of rediscovery of the traditional arts throughout South India and continued through the 1970s surge of general worldwide interest in martial arts.

During this period of renewed public interest in Kerala's native martial art, Kalaripayattu gurukkals such as Kottakkal Kanaran Gurukkal, Chambadan Veetil Narayanan Nair. Chambadan Veetil Narayanan Nair, a student of Kottackkal Kanaran Gurukkal, and in whose memory the CVN Kalaris are named, opened several kalaris, and began to spread Kalaripayattu across its native state of Kerala, revitalizing the art across the state in the twentieth century.

Chirakkal T. Sreedharan Nair is also widely credited for reviving and preserving Kalaripayattu by writing the first books ever written on Kalaripayattu, as well as writing the first authoritative text on the martial art. Sreedharan Nair is credited with writing Kalaripayattu, the first book ever written on Kalaripayattu, in 1937. This book was written in Malayalam, and listed the vaithari or oral commands, of all the exercises relating to meypayattu, or conditioning techniques. He is also credited with writing the first authoritative text and primer on Kalaripayattu, called Kalarippayattu – A Complete Guide to Kerala's Ancient Martial Art. The text, alongside a compilation of Sreedharan Nair's teaching notes, were translated into English by his sons S. R. A. Das and S. R. D. Prasad and then published by Westland Books. The book contains over 1,700 action photographs as well as explanations behind all of the exercises. It continues to be the most authentic reference material on Kalaripayattu to this day.

In the modern era, Kalaripayattu is also used by practitioners of Keralite dance styles, such as Kathakali and Mohiniyattam, as part of their training regimens. Recently, dancers from other, non-Keralite dance forms have also begun to incorporate Kalaripayattu into their training regimes, such as Vasundhara Doraswamy, a notable Bharatanatyam dancer.

In 2017, a 73-year-old gurukkal from Vadakara, Sri Meenakshi Amma, was awarded the Padma Sri by the Government of India for her contributions to the preservation of Kalaripayattu.

In January 2021, the Government of Kerala announced the opening of the Kalaripayattu Academy in Kerala's capital, Thiruvananthapuram, under the management of the Kerala Department of Tourism. The Kalaripayattu Academy will comprise an area of 3,500 feet, and will be part of the Vellar Crafts Village. The Kalaripayattu classes will be taught by a group of gurukkals from Kerala, led by Sri Meenakshi Amma, a Kalaripayattu gurukkal and Padma Sri recipient. The Kalaripayattu Academy will initially teach 100 students, both adults and children, in both morning and evening classes. Chief Minister Pinarayi Vijayan is set to announce the syllabus of the academy in 2021.

== Practice ==
Urumi usage in Kalaripayattu demonstrated by Gangadharan Gurukkal in Perambra, Kozhikode. In August 1895, British ethnographer F. Fawcett visited the same kalari, which was then located in Payyoli, and documented the 'Watta' (Otta), a weapon used to stab, strike, or turn an opponent. He also recorded the use of the 'shareeravadi,' a weapon unique to this kalari.

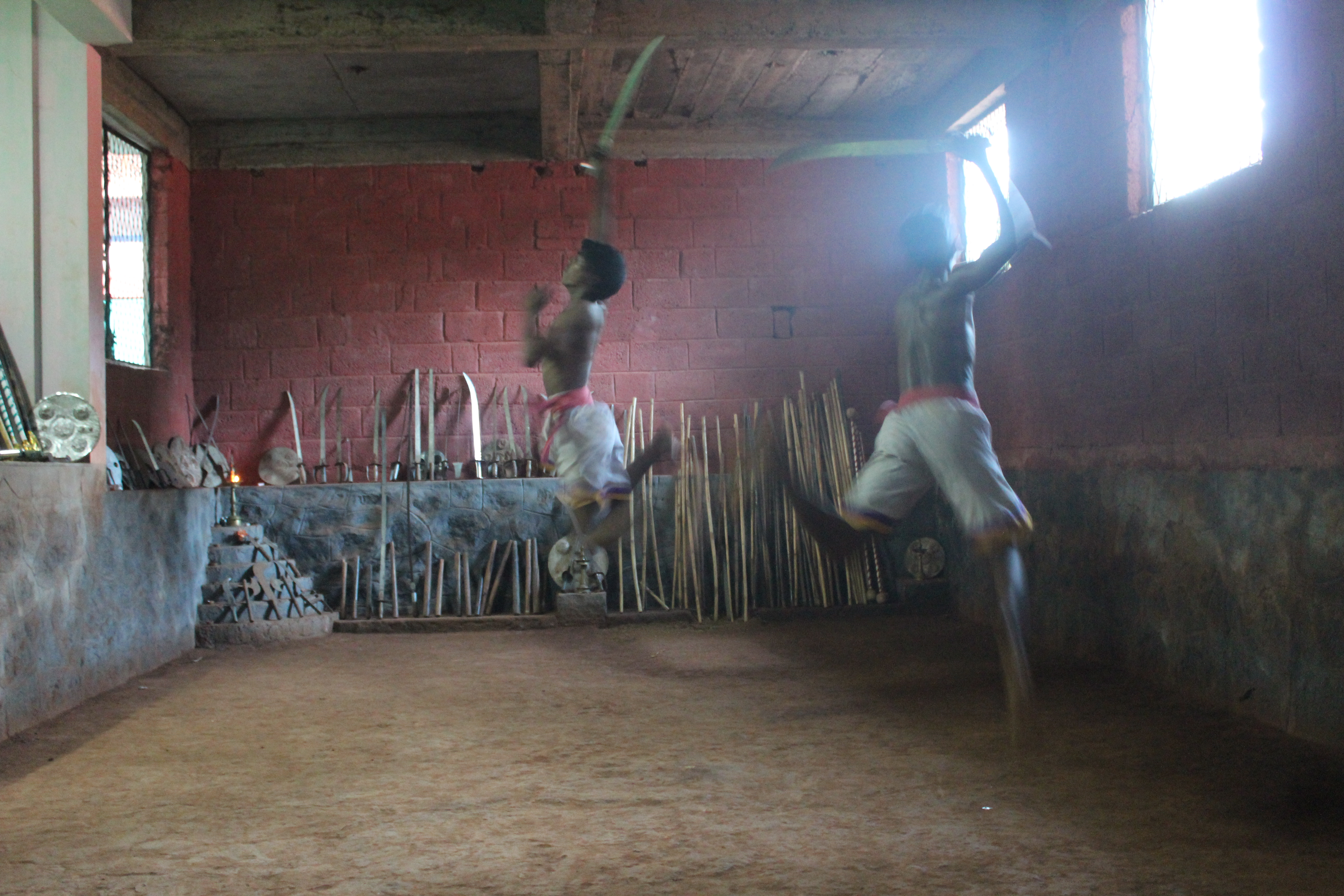
Kalaripayattu demonstration

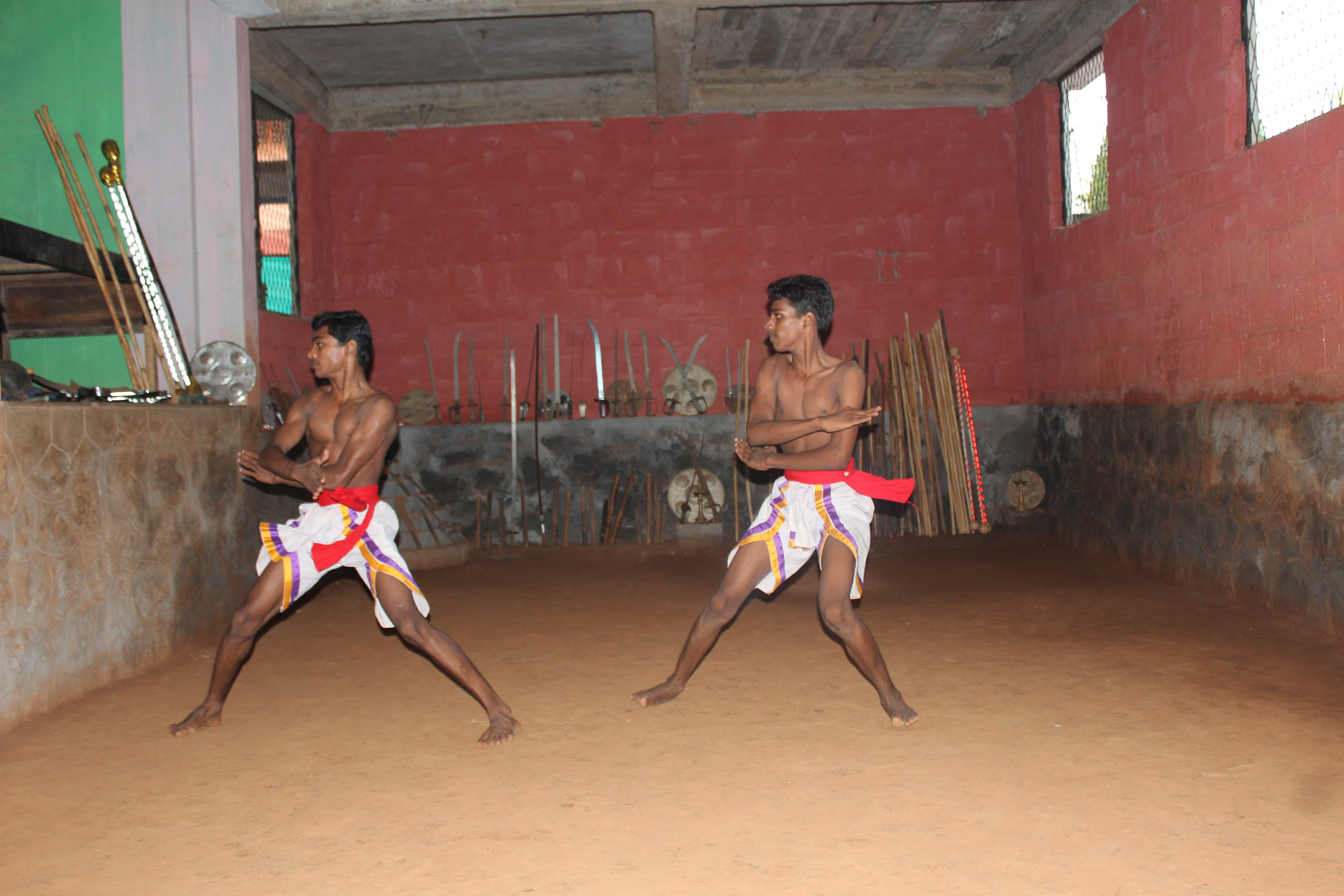
Kalaripayattu training stances

=== Guru–shishya tradition ===
Kalaripayattu is taught in accordance with the Indian guru-shishya system. Development and mastery of Kalaripayattu comes from the tradition of constantly learning, adapting and improving the techniques by observing what techniques are practical and effective. While importance is placed on observation of tradition, Kalaripayattu gurukkuls have contributed to the evolution of Kalaripayattu by way of their experience and reasoning.

=== Weaponry and armour ===
Kalaripayattu includes strikes, kicks, grappling, preset forms, weaponry, and healing methods. Warriors trained in Kalaripayattu would use very light, and basic body armour, as it was difficult to maintain flexibility and mobility while in heavy armour. Kalaripayattu differs from many other martial arts systems in the world in that weapon-based techniques are taught first, and barehanded techniques are taught last. The weapons used include gadas, spears, daggers, and urumis.

=== Training ground ===
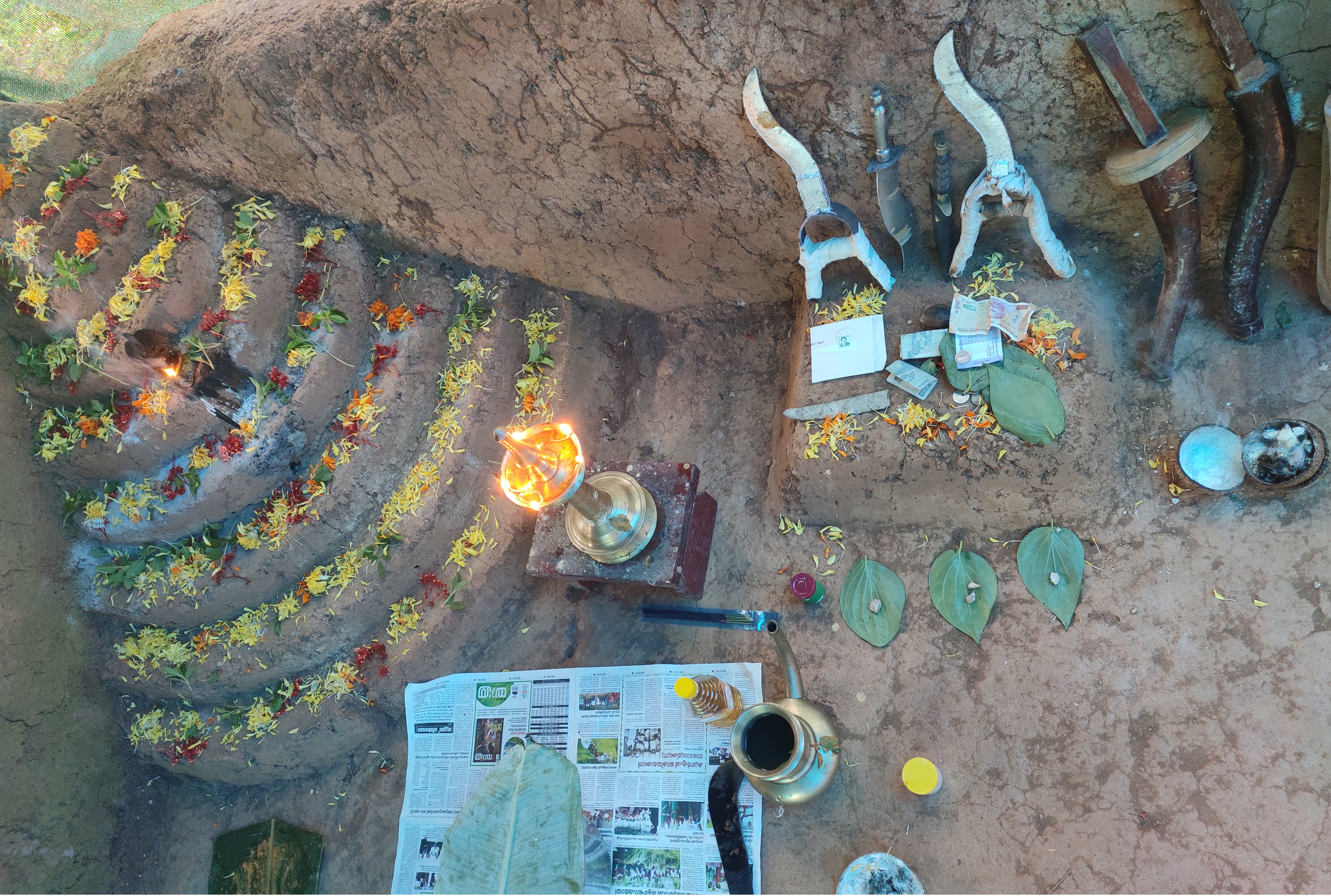
Kalari Poothara, a small, upwardly tapering, seven-tiered structure which stands in the south-western corner of the training kalari. Symbolizing the seven chakras in the human subtle body, some kalaris use nine tiers instead of seven.

Kalaripayattu is taught in a specialized training ground known as a kalari. The location and construction of each kalari is built in accordance to Hindu architectural treatises such as the Vastu Shastras along with various religious traditions and customs native to Kerala. Specifications are made regarding the physical dimensions of the kalari, how deep the ground in a kalari must be, along with the material that the floor of the kalari must consist of.

The floor of each kalari consists of red sand which is mixed with specific herbs that are said to aid in the treatment of small wounds suffered during training. The directional aspects of kalari construction are also specified, such as the entrance of the kalari facing east, and the location of ritualistic structures such as the Poothara, Ganapatithara, and Guruthara, are to face the west. The Poothara ("Flower ground" or "Flower floor" in Malayalam) in a kalari is a seven-step raised platform with a lotus-shaped kumbha or figure, at its apex. The art uses concepts similar to the ancient Indian medical text, the Ayurveda, and the seven steps represent the seven dhatu and the kosha of the human body as per Ayurvedic traditions. The kumbha at the apex of the poothara is said to represent Bhagavathy or the heart of the individual. The Ganapatithara ("Ground of Ganapati" in Malayalam) is the area of the kalari that is reserved for the worship of Ganapati, a Hindu deity that is said to be the remover of obstacles. The Guruthara ("Ground of the Guru" in Malayalam) is the area of the kalari that is reserved for worship of the Guru of the kalari, who represents the tradition of gurukkals in Kerala who protected and taught Kalaripayattu to the next generation. In the Ganapatithara, Ganapati is symbolically invoked by the placing of an otta, or tusk-shaped wooden stick. The paduka, or footwear, is placed at the Guruthara to symbolize the life of a gurukkal. The presiding deity of Kalaripayattu is said to be Bhadrakali or Bhagavathy.

Before every training session in the kalari, salutations are provided to the presiding deities and obedience is paid to the kalari temple. Students apply tilak or tikka on their foreheads and upon the forehead of the idol of the presiding deity using soil from the ground of the kalari.

=== Training uniform ===
The traditional training uniform used in Kalaripayattu is the kachakettal, a loincloth that is either red and white or red and black in colour. Along with traditional attire, oral commands, or vaithari, are given by the guru during training sessions, and are given in Sanskrit or Malayalam.

=== Chuvadu and Vadivu ===
A number of South Asian fighting styles remain closely connected to yoga, dance and performing arts. Some of the choreographed sparring in Kalaripayattu can be applied to dance and Kathakali dancers who knew Kalaripayattu were believed to be markedly better than other performers. Some traditional Indian classical dance schools still incorporate martial arts as part of their exercise regimen.

Kalaripayattu techniques are a combination of steps (Chuvadu) and postures (Vadivu). Chuvadu literally means 'steps', the basic steps of the martial arts. Vadivu literally means 'postures' or stances which are the foundations of Kalaripayattu training. They are named after animals, and are usually presented in eight forms. Styles differ considerably from one tradition to another. Not only do the names of poses differ, but their utilization and interpretation vary depending on the gurukkal, and the traditions of the kalari. Each stance has its own style, combination, and function. These techniques vary from one style to another.

=== Adaption of new techniques ===
A Kalari practitioner might encounter new fighting techniques from an enemy combatant. The Kalari practitioner would need to learn how to anticipate, adapt to and neutralize these new techniques. This is especially seen in the Southern style of Kalaripayattu, which is believed to have been adapted and modified during wars with Tamil kingdoms to counter martial arts like Silambam, which was one of the main martial art forms practiced by Tamil soldiers at the time.

=== Massage ===
As a result of learning about the human body, Indian martial artists became knowledgeable in the fields of traditional medicine and massage. Kalaripayattu teachers often provide massages (uzhichil) with medicinal oils to their students in order to increase their physical flexibility or to treat muscular injuries. Such massages are generally termed thirumal and the unique massage given to increase flexibility is known as katcha thirumal.

== Styles ==
Each style, or vazhi, in Kalaripayattu has a different purpose. (Note: Hanuman Vazhi ("The Way of Hanuman" in Malayalam) is a style that places emphasis on speed and technical application, along with several techniques to trick or outwit an enemy. Bali Vazhi ("The Way of Bali" in Malayalam) focuses on using the opponent's technical applications against them in such a way that it becomes dangerous to the opponent themselves. In Bhiman Vazhi ("The Way of Bhiman" in Malayalam), the usage of physical strength is predominant.) The styles are variations that various masters have adapted and modified according to their understanding of the art.

There are two major styles that are generally acknowledged within traditional Kalaripayattu, and are based on the regions in which they are practiced, the Northern style, or Vadakkan Kalari, and the Southern style, or Thekkan Kalari. These two systems have marked similarities in their styles or vazhi ("way" or "method" in Malayalam), such as Hanuman Vazhi, Bhiman Vazhi, and Bali Vazhi among others. The northern style of Kalaripayattu, or Vadakkan Kalari, is primarily practiced in the Malabar region of Kerala, and is based on elegant and flexible movements, evasions, jumps and weapons training. The southern style of Kalaripayattu, or Thekkan Kalari, is primarily practiced in the southern regions of Kerala, and specializes in hard, impact based techniques with emphasis on hand-to-hand combat and pressure point strikes. Both systems make use of internal and external concepts.

A third style, the Central style, or Madhya Kalari, is also practiced, but it is less commonly practiced than its northern and southern counterparts. A smaller, regional style of Kalaripayattu called Tulunadan Kalari, is referenced in texts such as the Vadakkan Pattukal, but it is largely restricted to the Tulu Nadu region in northern Kerala and southern Karnataka. Other smaller, regional styles are also said to exist in isolated regions of Kerala, but these styles are becoming increasingly rare, and difficult to find. Examples include Dronamballi, Odimurassery, Tulu Nadan Shaiva Mura, and Kayyangali.

=== Northern style ===
The Northern style is also known as Vadakkan Kalari, and is generally regarded as the "original" form of Kalaripayattu. This system places more emphasis on physical flexibility exercises rooted on the slogan Meyy kannavanam, meaning "make the body an eye". These exercises are done individually, as well as in combinations. After that meypayattu (a concept similar to kata in Karate) is taught. These are a combination of flexibility exercises with offensive and defensive techniques, however, the actual techniques are taught very much later. Traditionally, the number of meypayattu may differ as per the teaching methods of the guru. Training is usually done in four stages, the first stage being Meipayattu (training stances), followed by Kolthari (practice with wooden weapons), Angathari (practice with metal weapons) and finally Verum kai (barehanded combat). Generally, the majority of the Kalaris (schools that teach Kalaripayattu) start training with weapons within 3 to 6 months. Some Kalaris only allow one weapon to be learned per year. After long stick and small stick fighting, iron weapons are introduced. Weapons training begins with the dagger and sword, followed by the spear. Not all modern schools use specialized weapons. Traditionally, bows and arrows were commonly used in Kerala and students were trained in these techniques, but is rarely taught today.

=== Southern style ===
The Southern style is also known as Thekkan Kalari. Traditionally, it is believed to be a style of Kalaripayattu that is said to have been altered and influenced by Agastya. It is an essentially the northern style of Kalaripayattu that has been influenced by martial arts from neighboring regions, such as Varma Adi or Adi Murai. While the Southern form of Kalaripayattu has notable similarities to Varma Adi, it is considered to be a distinct and separate martial art from Varma Adi due to its similarities to Northern Kalaripayattu. The similarities between the southern form of Kalaripayattu and Varma Adi are likely due to geographic proximity to each other, with the Southern style of Kalaripayattu being considered a mixture of Kalaripayattu and Varma Adi. While the Southern style is less commonly practiced in Kerala compared to the Northern style, it is revered in Kerala as a combination of the teachings of both Parashurama and Agastya. It is predominantly practiced in some regions of the southern parts of Kerala, particularly in areas near Kanyakumari. While many of the exercises of the Southern style are identical to the Northern Style, it is more combative and martial in nature, and places heavy emphasis on hand-to-hand combat, hard impact techniques, and footwork, rather than emphasizing flexibility like the Northern style. It starts with the training in Chuvadu, a system of various combinations of fighting techniques similar to Muay Thai and Judo. Immediately after that, sparring with a partner is introduced as part of the training. These pre-determined techniques are repeatedly trained. After a basic proficiency in unarmed combat is established, weapons training begins with a small stick. Small stick training is usually done with two combatants, armed with a stick or dagger. These are primarily defensive techniques. Fighting techniques with two combatants having the same weapons include sparring with long stick, sword, etc. During the duration of this training, the refining of un-armed combat also progresses. As the student gains more experience, a small amount of knowledge pertaining to the Marma points (pressure points) is also taught to the student if deemed appropriate by the gurukkal.

== Marmashastram – striking of vital points ==
It is claimed that experienced Kalari warriors could disable or kill their opponents by merely striking the correct marmam (vital point) on their opponent's body. This technique is taught only to the most promising and level-headed students so as to discourage misuse of the technique. Marmashastram stresses on the knowledge of marmam and is also used for marma treatment (marmachikitsa). This system of marma treatment originated from Ayurveda, as well as Siddha medicine. Critics of Kalaripayattu have pointed out that the application of marmam techniques against neutral outsiders has not always produced verifiable results.

The earliest mention of marmam is found in the Rig Veda, where Indra is said to have defeated Vritra by attacking his marmam with a vajra. References to marmam are also found in the Atharva Veda. With numerous other scattered references to vital points in Vedic and epic sources, it is certain that India's early martial artists knew about and practiced attacking or defending vital points. Sushruta (c. 6th century BCE) identified and defined 107 vital points of the human body in his Sushruta Samhita. Of these 107 points, 64 were classified as being lethal if properly struck with a fist or stick. Sushruta's work formed the basis of the medical discipline Ayurveda, which was taught alongside various Indian martial arts that had an emphasis on vital points, such as Varma kalai and Marma adi.

== Governing bodies ==
In India, the Indian Kalaripayattu Federation (IKF) in Thiruvananthapuram is one of the primary governing bodies of Kalaripayattu. It is recognized by the Ministry of Youth Affairs and Sports of the Government of India. It received affiliation as a regional sports federation in 2015.

The Kalaripayattu Federation of India (KFI), based in Kozhikode, is another governing body of Kalaripayattu, as has been recognized by the Indian Olympic Association.

The Kerala Kalaripayattu Association (KKA) in Thiruvananthapuram is also a governing body of the martial art which is recognised by the Kerala State Sports Council.

== Notable practitioners ==
Kottakkal Kanaran Gurukkal (1850–1935), also known as the "Dronacharya of Kalaripayattu", was a gurukkal of Chambadan Veetil Narayanan Nair. Korrakkal Kanaran Gurukkal is recognized as one of the gurukkals who preserved Kalaripayattu in Kerala and allowed it to survive into the twentieth century after studying it from several gurukkals in the Malabar region of the state. During the British ban of Kalaripayattu, he is said to have sold his lands and property to finance the study of Kalaripayattu.

Chambadan Veetil Narayanan Nair (1905–1944), a Kalaripayattu gurukkal and student of Kottakal Kanaran Gurukkal, who was popularly known as "CVN" and in whose memory the CVN Kalaris sprang up across Kerala, enabling the revival of Kalaripayattu across its native state.

Chirakkal T. Sreedharan Nair (1909–1984), a Kalaripayattu gurukkal, and founder of Sree Bharat Kalari (formerly known as Rajkumar Kalari). He is known for writing the first books on Kalaripayattu. His first work, Kalaripayattu, written in Malayalam and published in 1937, was the first book written on Kalaripayattu. He also authored first authoritative text and primer on Kalaripayattu, called Kalarippayattu – A Complete Guide to Kerala's Ancient Martial Art. The text is considered to be the most authentic reference material on Kalaripayattu to this day.

For their contributions to the preservation of Kalaripayattu, Meenakshi Amma, a 73 year old gurukkal from Vadakara and Sankara Narayana Menon Chundayil, a gurukkal from Chavakkad, were awarded the Padma Sri by the Government of India.

== In popular culture ==
Martial artist Jasmine Simhalan demonstrating Meypayattu.

In the Indian graphic novels Odayan and Odayan II – Yuddham, the title character is a vigilante who is highly skilled in Kalaripayattu, with the story itself being set in 16th century feudal Kerala.

Little Kalari Warriors, a cartoon made by Toonz Animation India for Cartoon Network, features Kalaripayattu practitioners as the principal characters. Kalaripayattu is also seen in the Indian animated film Arjun: The Warrior Prince (2012). In the Indian role-playing game Ashwathama – The Immortal, which is based on Indian mythology, the fight scenes were choreographed using Kalaripayattu, with the movements of the characters being motion captured from real Kalaripayattu masters.

Kalaripayattu is used as a fighting style for the character Connie Maheswaran in the American animated television series Steven Universe. Outside of Indian video games, characters in international games also use Kalaripayattu, such as Voldo in the Soulcalibur series, Asura in Death Battle, and others. The style is also used by Cyril Rahman, Ethan Stanley and Shō Kanō in the Japanese manga TV series Kenichi: The Mightiest Disciple. In 2019, a character of Indian origin was introduced for the first time in the Japanese manga, Agari. It features a character named Ravi, a Kalaripayattu master, as the protagonist.

While numerous documentaries have been made about or referencing Kalaripayattu, one of the earliest known documentaries on the subject is a BBC documentary titled The Way of the Warrior. Kalaripayattu was also documented in Season 2 of Fight Quest.

=== In film ===
Kalaripayattu has also featured in international and Indian films such as:

- Thacholi Othenan (1964)
- Aromalunni (1972)
- Ondanondu Kaladalli (Kannada) (1978)
- Chilambu (1986)
- Oru Vadakkan Veeragatha (1989)
- Kallan Kappalil Thanne (1991)
- Thacholi Varghese Chekavar (1995)
- Asoka (2001) (Hindi)
- The Myth (2005) (English)
- The Last Legion (2007) (English)
- Kerala Varma Pazhassi Raja (2009)
- Manasara (2010) (Telugu)
- Urumi (2011)
- Commando (2013) (Hindi)
- Bajirao Mastani (2015) (Hindi)
- Baaghi (2016) (Hindi)
- Veeram (2016)
- Padmaavat (2018) (Hindi)
- Kayamkulam Kochunni (2018)
- Junglee (2019) (Hindi)
- Athiran (2019)
- Sanak (2021) (Hindi)
- Spider-Man: Across the Spider-Verse (2023) (English)
- Ajayante Randam Moshanam (2024)
- Param Sundari (film) (2025)

== See also ==
- Meenakshi Amma
- Angampora
- Banshay
- Bataireacht
- Bōjutsu
- Gatka
- Adimurai
- Indian martial arts
- Kendo
- Krabi–krabong
- Kuttu Varisai
- Mardani khel
- Silambam
- Tahtib
- Thang-ta
- Varma kalai
- Ankam
- Kalarippayattu films
- Malayali

== Sources ==
- Arafath, P. K. Yasser (9 April 2016). "The Nadapuram Enigma a History of Violence and Communalism in North Malabar (1957–2015)". Economic and Political Weekly. 51 (15).
- Green, Thomas A. (2001). Martial Arts of the World: A–Q. ABC-CLIO. ISBN 9781576071502.
- Menon, A. Sreedhara (4 March 2011). Kerala History and its Makers. D. C. Books. ISBN 978-81-264-3782-5.
- Shaji, John K. (2011). Kalaripayattu: The Martial and Healing Arts of Kerala. Published by the author.
- Wollok, Jenniffer G. (2011). Rethinking Chivalry and Courtly Love. ABC Publishing. p. 250. ISBN 9780275984885.
- Zarrilli, Phillip B. (1979). "Kalarippayatt, Martial Art of Kerala". The Drama Review. 23 (2): 113–124. doi:10.2307/1145220. JSTOR 1145220.
- Zarrilli, Phillip B. (1992). "To Heal and/or To Harm: The Vital Spots (Marmmam/Varmam) in Two South Indian Martial Traditions Part I: Focus on Kerala's Kalarippayattu". Journal of Asian Martial Arts. 1 (1).
- Zarrilli, Phillip B. (1994). "A South Indian Martial art and the Yoga and Ayurvedic Paradigms". Journal of Asian Martial Arts. Archived from the original on 16 September 2008.
- Zarrilli, Phillip B. (1998). When the Body Becomes All Eyes: Paradigms, Discourses, and Practices of Power in Kalarippayattu, a South Indian Martial Art. Oxford University Press. ISBN 9780195639407.
