= Rich Mix =

Charity and multi-arts venue

Coordinates: 51.5243°N 0.0733°W

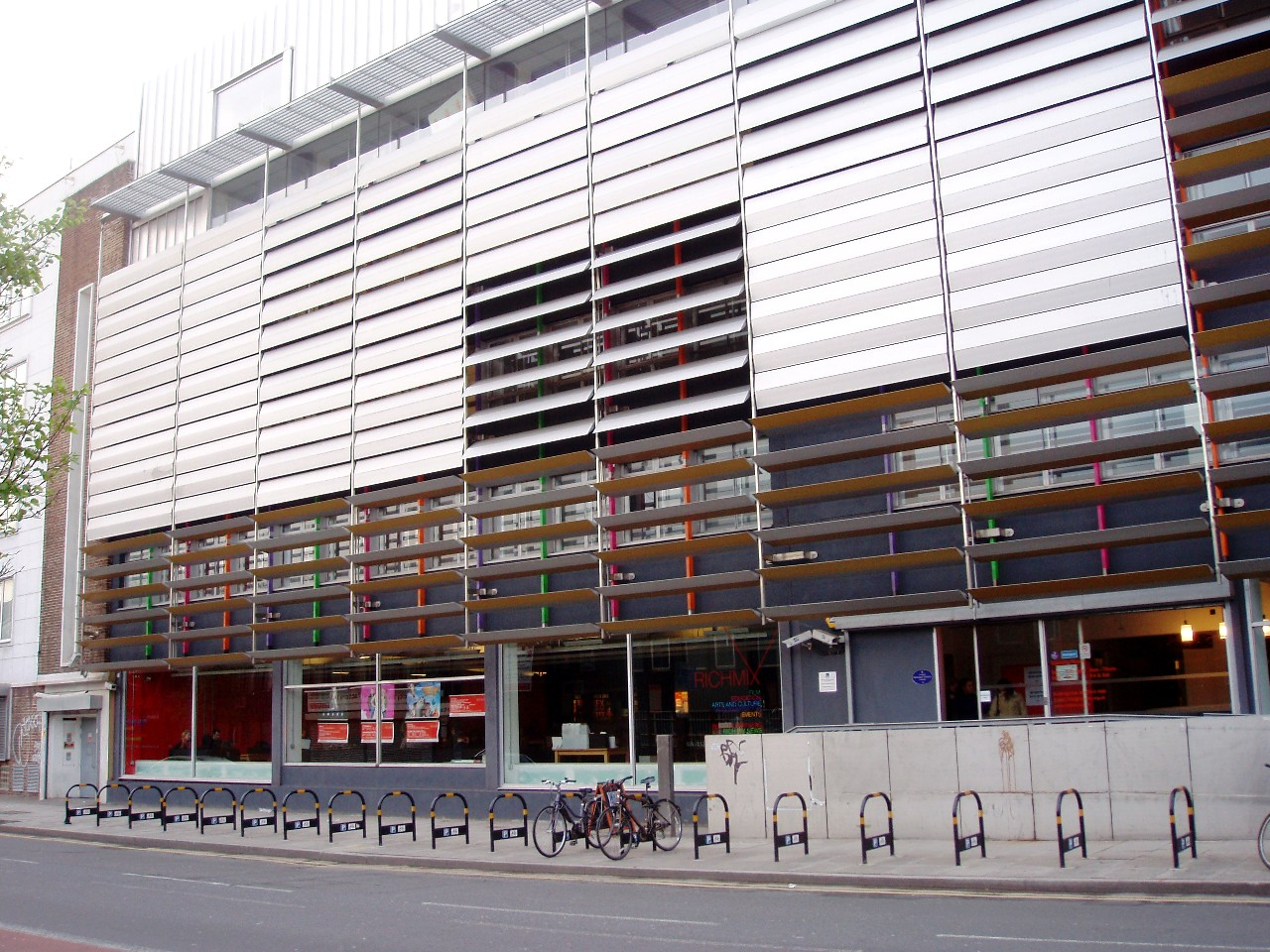
The Rich Mix building

Rich Mix is a charity that offers cinema and cross-arts centre that is located in the East End of London, located in Shoreditch in the Borough of Tower Hamlets, East London, England. Once a vast leather factory, 62,000-square-foot building was transformed into a multi-arts venue, which has offered free arts and culture events to over 35,000 people in 2014–2015. Stretched over five floors, the building contains a three-screen cinema showing the latest mainstream and independent films, and a multitude of flexible performance spaces, where both emerging and established artists are welcome to rehearse and perform. Rich Mix also house 20 creative organisations with a combined turnover of over £23,000,000 per year, employing more than 320 people across a wide range of businesses.

== History ==
The building housed a leather factory until the 2000s, when tens of millions of pounds were spent knocking it down and building it up again to become Rich Mix, East London's Independent Arts Venue. This was widely reported in London newspapers and among the subjects of forensic accounting investigations by Deloitte, for London Assembly members, and then Price Waterhouse for the next Mayor.

== Objectives ==
- To advance public education in the history of migrant communities and their contributions to economic and cultural life, particularly by establishing the Rich Mix Centre as a home for exhibitions and by exhibiting items of educational value.
- To advance education of the public in art and culture.
- To work towards the elimination of racial discrimination and to promote equality of opportunity and good relations between persons of different racial groups.
