= Ezhuthachan (caste) =

Caste native to Kerala, India

Ezhuthachan (Malayalam: എഴുത്തച്ഛൻ, eḻuttacchan), also known as Kadupattar (Malayalam: കടുപട്ടർ, kaṭupaṭṭar), is a caste native to the Indian state of Kerala. (Note: Kadupattan sometimes referred to as Kadupottan(Member of Kadupotta clan), It is the combination of place names Kaduru and Pottalakkare(Also known as Patancheru).) It is classified as an Other Backward Class by the Government of India under its system of positive discrimination.

They mainly belong to the districts of Thrissur, Palakkad, Malappuram, and Kozhikode in Kerala, and are also present in other parts of India. The traditional profession of the Ezhuthachan caste is teaching. The community is represented by an organization known as the Ezhuthachan Samajam.

== Genesis ==
There are two main beliefs about the origin of the Kadupattan people.

1. Pattar (Bhattar) Brahmins who were boycotted from Kadu village in the medieval Chola–Pandya region due to the introduction of Buddhism. From the Zamorin's Kovilakam (Ambadi Kovilakam), the elder Thamburatti (senior princess) asserted the title Ezhuthachan and assigned them as village schoolmasters.

2. A Jain guild that was prominent in teaching came to Kerala and became village school teachers. With the influence of the Bhakthi movement, they came under Hinduism.

== History ==
The Kaduru (in present-day Karnataka) of the Western Ganga dynasty was a Jain settlement. From the 8th to the 10th centuries, Jainism was the prominent religion in the Western Ganga dynasty. From the 9th to the 13th centuries, present-day Patancheru, or Pottalakkare, in Telangana was the principal Jain hub in South India. In Jainism, there was a tradition of using the province name once abandoned as clan name. Evidence suggests that Kadupattan was a Jain guild that formed Kaduru and Patancheru and was prominent in the teaching profession.

After the twelfth century, the prominence of Jainism in South India decreased significantly. Many followers of Jainism abandoned their settlements and moved south to present-day Tamil Nadu. Kadupattigal, one among the thirteenth-century rulers of the southern Arcot region who were present on the banks of the Kaveri River, should have been the ancestors of Ezhuthachan (Kadupattan). (Note: There are mentions about Kadupattigal in South Indian Inscriptions. Who had marriage alliance with Pallava King, Who made donation to temples like Apatsahayesvarar Temple, Thirumarperu Manikandeswarar Temple, Vedaranyeswarar temple, Mahalingeswarar Temple etc., And About prime minister of Nandivarman II who bore the title Kadupattigal Tamilapperaraiyan (Feudatories of pallava kingdom also had this title).)

Wars that took place during the thirteenth and fourteenth centuries, involving Sadayavarman Sundara Pandyan I, the Kakatiyas, and the Delhi Sultanate, caused Kadupattans to come to Kerala through a route that ran from the banks of the Kaveri through the Nilgiri mountains. Under the influence of the Bhakti movement, they were Hinduised as Vaishnavas (Ramanuja), Shaivas, and Shaktheyas. In the occupation of Ezhuthachan (village schoolmaster), teachers who practised Shakti worship became known as Gurukkal. Historian K. Balakrishna Kurup concludes the history of the Ezhuthachan (Kadupattan) caste in this manner.

It is believed that the Kadupattans reached Malabar by the fifteenth century (c. CE 1447). Although the Aithihyamala tells of a magician (Chembra Makku Ezhuthachan) who belonged to the Kadupattan caste, was a disciple of the Kakkassery Bhattathiri, and was a member of a family with a tradition of teaching, his lifespan is unclear. (Note: Palm-leaf manuscripts collected from various places of Valluvanad, Which dates back mid 19th century contain mention about Kadupattan and Ezhuthachan. From C.E 1849 and C.E 1833 respectively.) One edition of Keralolpathi, published by Hermann Gundert, includes a reference to kaduppattar. One of the first government records which mentions the Ezhutachan caste is the British India census taken on 17 February 1881.

Kadupattans entered Kerala through the Palakkad Gap. Their migration took place in a number of groups of families. The first group of eight families (Ettu veettukar) came and settled near Tirunavaya in the Malabar region; some of their family names were Thekkeppattu, Vadakkeppattu, Kizhakkeppattu, Padinjareppattu, Meleppattu, and Keezheppattu. The family of Chembra Ezhuthachan belongs to the tradition of Ettu veettukar. The second group of thirty-two families (Muppaththirandu veettukaar) settled in the Thrissur region. Soon afterwards, another group of close relatives of Ettu veettukar and Muppaththirandu veettukaar settled in the Palakkad region. Gradually, they spread to other areas. Clashes between soldiers of the Zamorin and the Portuguese India Armadas that took place during the sixteenth century in the coastal areas of the Malabar region caused many Kadupattans who were inhabitants of the coastal areas of the Kingdom of Tanur to move to Kanniyampuram of Valluvanad (southern Malabar) (in present-day Ottappalam taluk), Chittur, and other parts of the Kingdom of Cochin, where they settled.

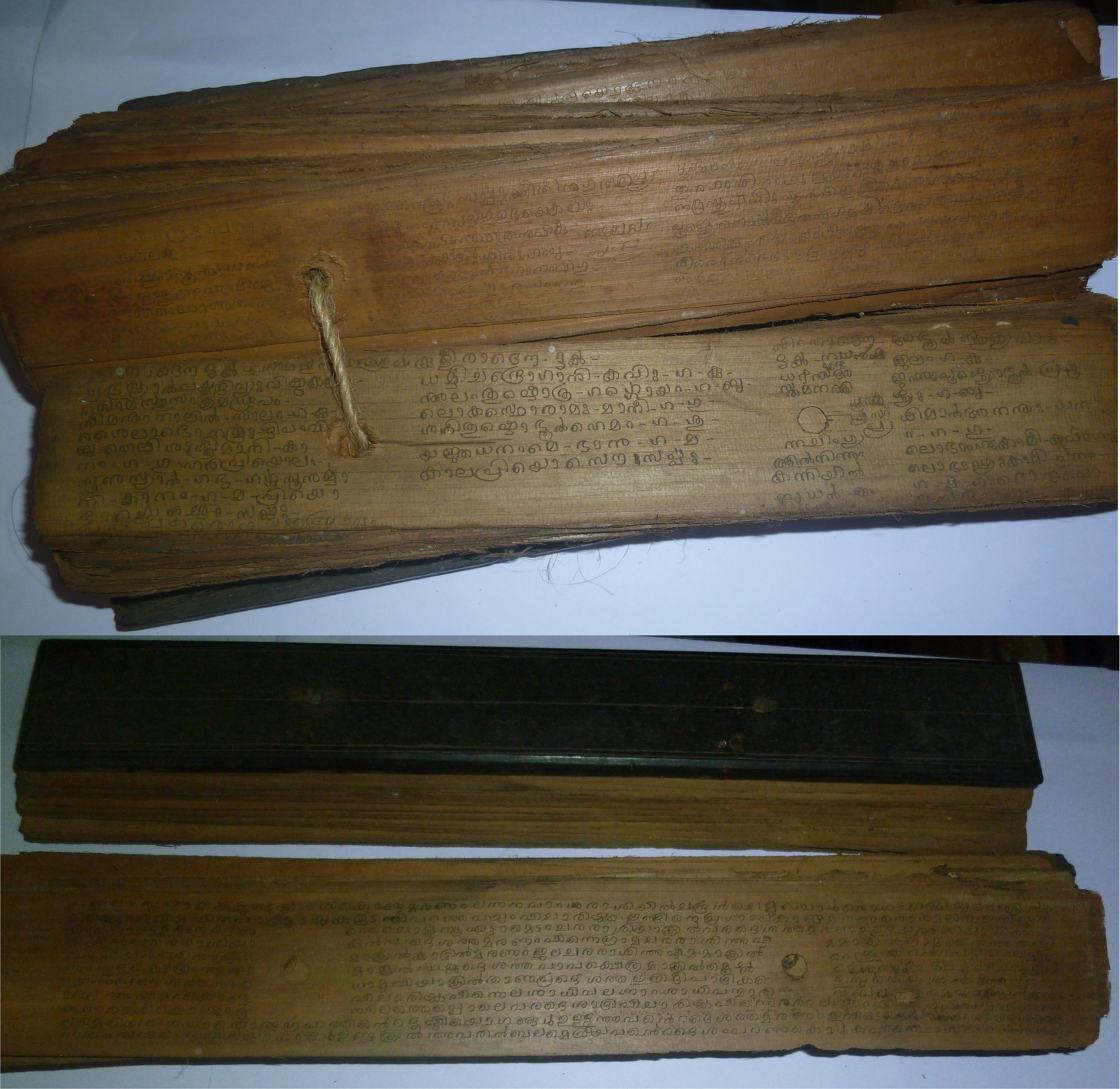
Early 20th-century palm-leaf manuscripts which deal with astrology and teaching from Avinissery, Thrissur.

Kadupattans played a major role in spreading Vattezhuthu in Palakkad, Malabar, and the Kingdom of Cochin. They were usually well-versed in Sanskrit as well. Kadupattans used the prayer of the Jain Tirthankara jina dheva (Namosthu jeenathe) in their Ezhuthupalli (Malayalam: എഴുത്തുപള്ളി, eḻuttupaḷḷi), and taught Vattezhuthu, Mathematics, etc.

According to historian M. G. S. Narayanan, the literary activities of Malabar, especially among the Sudras, were strengthened after the arrival of Kadupattars. The translation of many texts from Sanskrit to Malayalam took place in the period after their arrival.

In Kerala, they were treated as shudra. However, they were permitted to go and pray as far as the Sacrificial stone (Balikkallu) of the temple. Some other communities called the men of the community Pattarappan (Malayalam: പട്ടരപ്പൻ, paṭṭarappan) and the women Pattathiyaramma (Malayalam: പട്ടത്തിയാരമ്മ, paṭṭattiyaramma). In government records, Kadupattans were referred to as the Choular (people from the Chola country). It is believed that the Zamorin had placed them in a high position in society. The envy of the Zamorin's minister (Mangattachan) is said to have placed them under the status of low-class shudras in society. Pattanam pizhaithavar (those who lost status) was a term used by other communities to refer to Kadupattans. Although the Ezhuthachan caste is very similar to the Nair community (even though some records classify them as Nairs), they have nothing to do with the Nair community. Perhaps they adopted the traditional methods prevalent in Kerala after their arrival.

Until the introduction of the public education system in Kerala, Kadupattans were present in the Kingdom of Cochin and Malabar as Ezhuthachans (village schoolmasters), and they ran Ezhuthupallis (traditional village schools). They taught wealthy people by staying in their homes, and this practice was called Ezhuthachan thamasikkuka(Malayalam: എഴുത്തച്ഛൻ താമസിക്കുക, eḻuttacchan tamasikkuka). Traditionally, although the caste placed importance on teaching, other occupations such as palanquin bearing, carrying salt and oil and marketing them, agriculture, etc., were also practised. Famous magicians, Physicians, astrologers, and Sanskrit scholars have emerged from this caste. Panikkar was a title used by some Kadupattans.

Ezhuthachans were historically associated with the village-school teaching profession in Kerala. Wagner and Ashokan, in a 2024 study of Malayalam Kaṇakkatikāram manuscripts, identify eḻuttacchan and Kaṇiyār among the castes associated with the teaching profession. They suggest that village-school teachers from different caste and professional backgrounds participated in the transmission, adaptation, and teaching of Kaṇakkatikāram, a genre of elementary mathematical treatises dealing with calculation, measurements, commerce, land, gold, rice, and other subjects. The manuscripts appear to have circulated through decentralized networks of teachers and students rather than through a single centralized educational institution.

After the introduction of the modern public education system, traditional teaching methods became less important in society. Many Ezhuthupallis (traditional village schools) run by Ezhuthachans (Kadupattans) were converted into public schools using modern teaching methods. In the 19th century, when British rule introduced public education in the Malabar, the Ezhuthachan community made major contributions to public education in Valluvanad.

== Physical appearance ==
The skin complexion of Ezhuthachans (Kadupattans) varies from dark to interlinked black and white. Edgar Thurston observes that they are 'dark & white skinned people, medium in stature, with simple nose and curly or wavy hair'.

== Customs, inheritance and worship methods ==
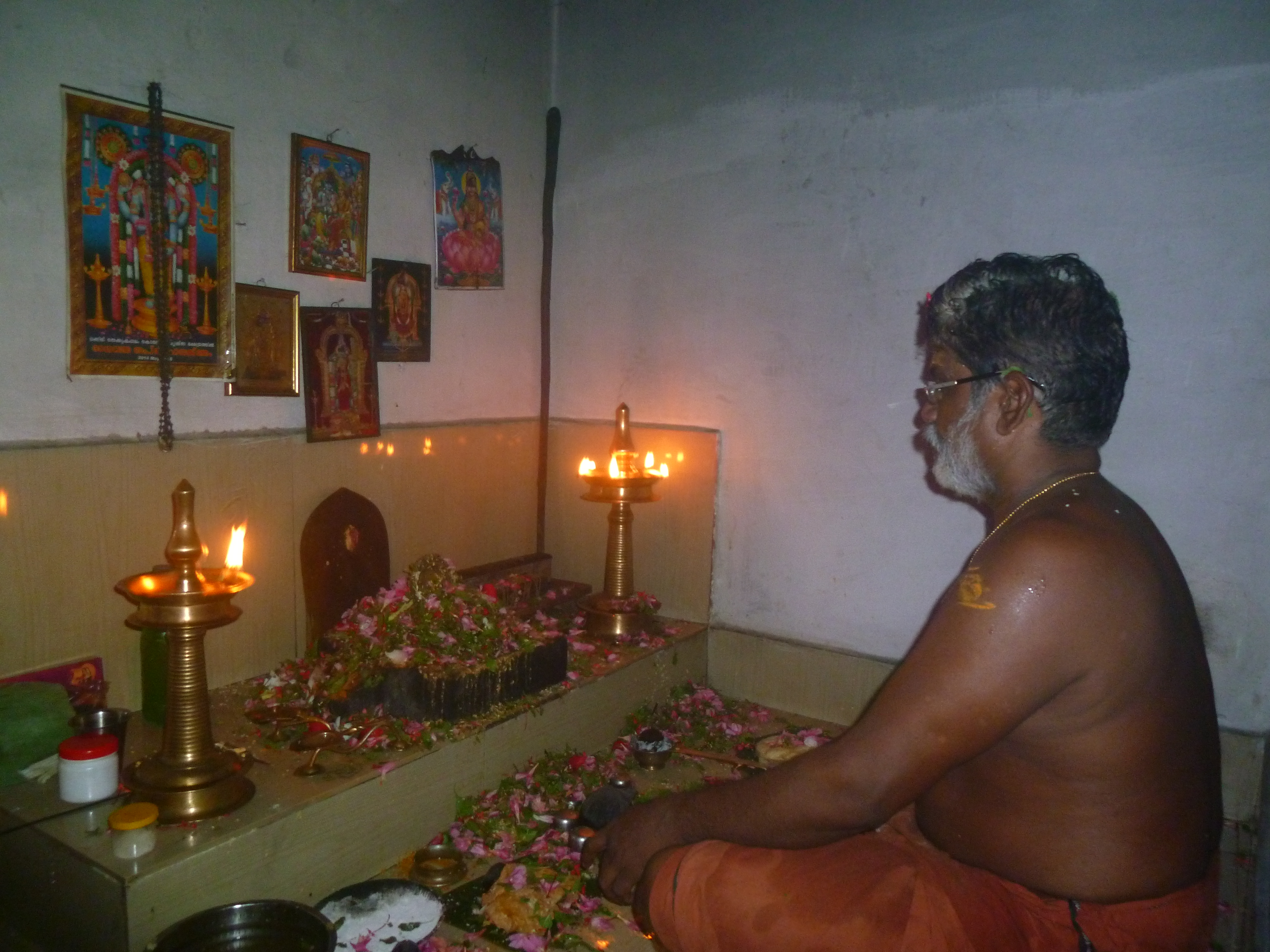
Ezhuthachan(Kadupattan) worshipping his deity

Though there are slight local differences in customs, Tamil practices are generally followed. According to William Logan's Malabar Manual, this caste followed a modified Makkathayam (patriarchal / patrilineal system of inheritance), in which property descended from father to son but not from father to daughter. At wedding ceremonies, there are rituals such as Ganapathy homam (a ritual dedicated to Lord Ganesha, performed to seek his blessings), Dhakshina giving (giving donations to elders and seeking their blessings), and Panigrahanam (the groom holds the hand of the bride). There was no polygamy, and polyandry prevailed, but widows remarried. There are peculiarities in the death rituals of the Ezhuthachan caste that indicate that they were a foreign caste. The Ezhuthachan caste worshipped Ganapathy, Vettakkorumakan, Shakti, Bhagavati, and Vishnumaya.

It is believed that Adi Shankara instructed Kadupattans in Shakti worship. Even now, their descendants follow this tradition and claim that it was inherited from their forefathers.

== Ezhuthachan Samajam ==
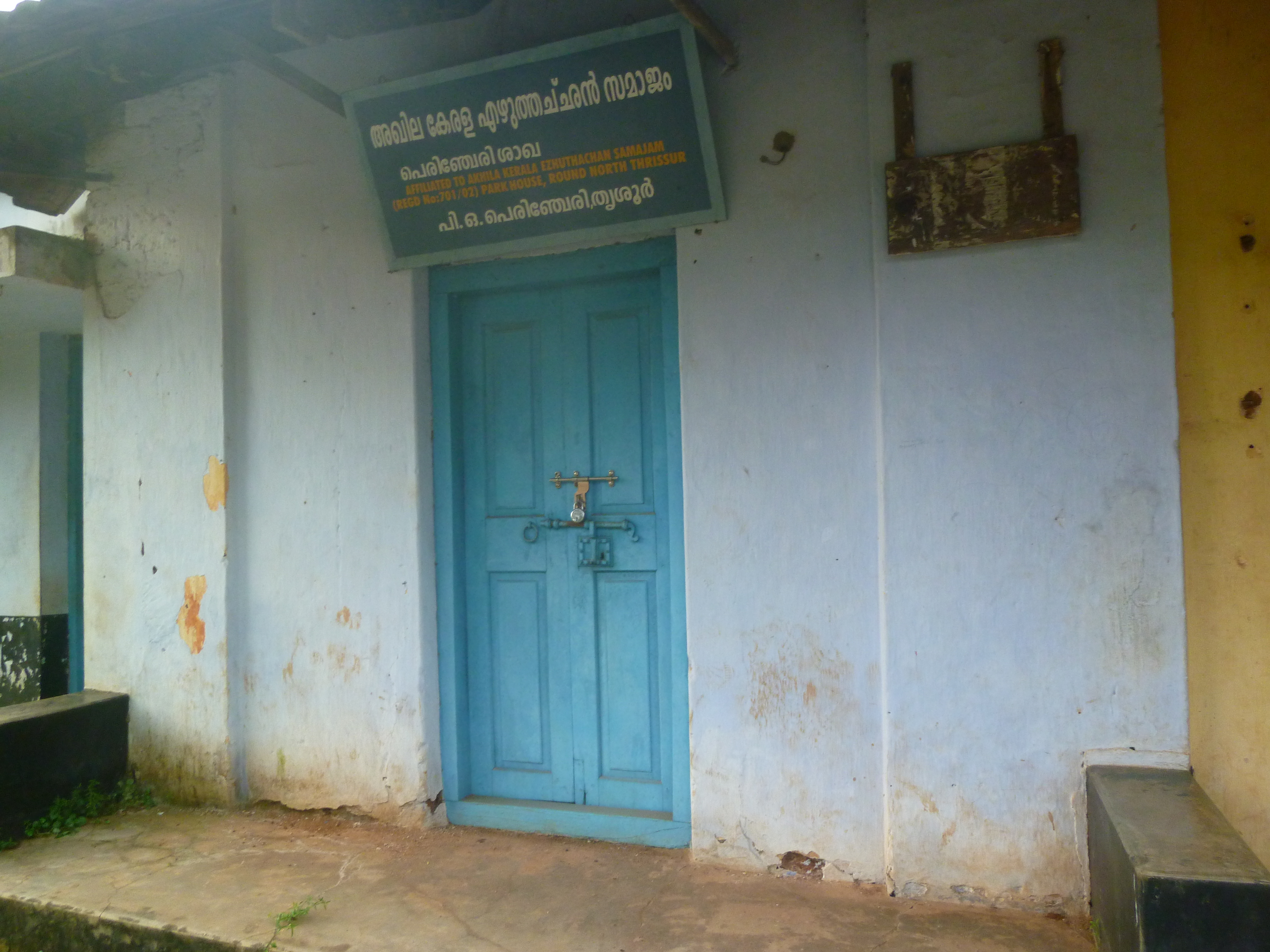
One of the oldest Ezhuthachan Samajam offices, built during the 1920s and situated at Avinissery, Thrissur

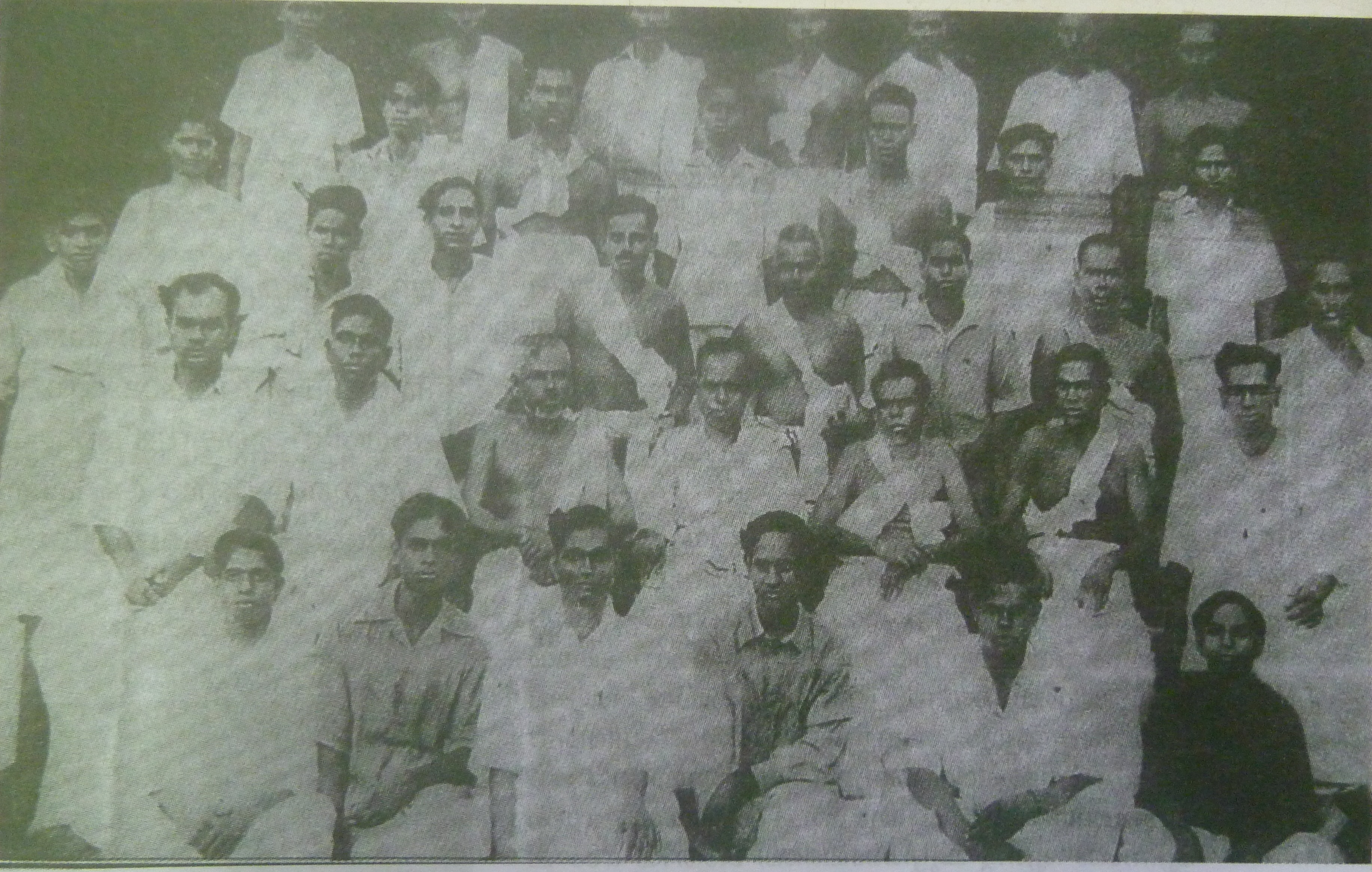
Ezhuthachan Yuvajana Raksha Samgham, Perinchery, in 1937

Ezhuthachan Samajam started functioning in 1906. The first organizer was Mr. Chakkulliyal Kunjunni Ezhuthachan, a Sanskrit scholar and teacher who was a disciple of the legendary Sanskrit scholar and teacher Revered Punnasseri Nambi Neelakanta Sharma. He named the organization Adhyapaka Samajam.

Although Adhyapaka Samajam made several reforms to caste customs and rituals, Kunjunni Ezhuthachan's efforts were unsuccessful, and he abandoned the project. The Ezhuthachan Samajam came into being when Vakil P. Kumaran Ezhuthachan entered the movement. He was the founder of the Ezhuthachan Samajam and an architect of the present-day Ezhuthachan community. He was also a freedom fighter, a member of the Congress Party, and a member of the Cochin State Prajamandal, whose founder was Sri V. R. Krishnan Ezhuthachan, his son-in-law.

Later, Mr. Krishnan Ezhuthachan succeeded his mentor and father-in-law, Mr. Kumaran Ezhuthachan, as president of the Ezhuthachan Samajam. Since both were involved in Congress politics, the freedom movement, peasant struggles, and the Cochin State Prajamandal, they found it difficult to continue the Ezhuthachan Samajam movement. In the late 1940s, Krishnan Ezhuthachan left the movement, as did Vakil P. Kumaran Ezhuthachan. Kumaran Ezhuthachan left the movement following the death of his son, P. Lakshmanakumar.

After 1947, the Ezhuthachan community was left without leadership. There were some attempts to revitalize the community by various people, but these did not succeed. The services of Adv. Late M. Krishnankutty are mentioned in this context. In the post-1990 period, there was some resurgence in the community. From the late 1990s, new thinking became visible in the community. From 2002, Mr. T. G. Ravi became involved and revitalized the Samajam's activities. The present president, Prof. Dr. Lakshmanakumar, is the grandson of Vakil P. Kumaran Ezhuthachan and the son of V. R. Krishnan Ezhuthachan.

There are educational institutions under the Ezhuthachan Samajam.

Organizations representing the Ezhuthachan community were subsequently formed and operated at levels ranging from all-India to regional organizations. The latest organization to be formed in this category is the Palakkad Ezhuthachan Samudhaya Trust, based in Palakkad.

== Thunchaththu Ezhuthachan ==
There is no clear history of the birth or life of Thunchaththu Ezhuthachan. However, there is a belief that Thunchathth Ramanujan Ezhuthachan was a member of the Ezhuthachan (Kadupattan) community. Being a Vaishnava (Ramanuja) sect member, he was called Ramanujan. His real name was Thunchan (the youngest child). According to K. Balakrishna Kurup, Thunchath Ezhuthachan was a member of the Ezhuthachan (Kadupattan) community and lived as a teacher, following celibacy throughout his life. E. P. Bhaskara Guptan, a writer and independent researcher in local history from Kadampazhipuram, Palakkad, supports the conclusion of K. Balakrishna Kurup about Thunchathth Ezhuthachan's caste. Historian Velayudhan Panikkassery has also expressed the same opinion.

Historian M. G. S. Narayanan points to a mention of Jain monks in Adhyathma Ramayanam Kilippattu as evidence of Thunchaththu Ezhuthachan's familiarity with Jain monks.

== Notable people ==
- V. R. Krishnan Ezhuthachan
- A. M. Paraman
- P. Kumaran Ezhuthachan
- K. N. Ezhuthachan
- E. K. Krishnan Ezhuthachan
- C. N. Balakrishnan
- T. G. Ravi
- Chembra Ezhuthachanmar
