= Kurup =

Kurup is a Malayali surname. Notable people with this surname include:

- Achutha Kurup (died 2017), Indian volleyball player, coach and naval officer
- Arthur Joseph Kurup (born 1982), Malaysian politician, lawyer and economist
- Ashwathy Kurup (born 1970), Indian former actress, costume designer and dancer
- Azhakathu Padmanabha Kurup (1869–1931), Indian Sanskrit and Malayalam scholar and poet
- B. Madhusoodhana Kurup (born 1954), Indian ichthyologist and academic administrator
- Debbie Kurup (born 1979), English actress
- Deepika Kurup (born 1998), American inventor, scientist, and clean water advocate
- G. Janardhana Kurup (died 2011), Indian lawyer and communist politician
- G. Shankara Kurup (1901–1978), Indian poet
- O. N. V. Kurup (1931–2016), Malayalam poet
- Palattu Koman (also known as Koma Kurup), a pioneer of the kalaripayattu Indian martial art form
- Guru Kunchu Kurup (1881–1970), Kathakali artiste
- Helen Kurup (born 1986), English actress, sister of Debbie
- Joseph Kurup (1944–2024), Malaysian politician
- K. Balakrishna Kurup (1927–2000), Malayalam writer
- K. K. N. Kurup (born 1939), Indian historian
- K. N. P. Kurup (born 1938), Indian communist politician and journalist
- K. Narayana Kurup (1927–2013), Indian politician
- K. Suresh Kurup (born 1956), member of the Legislative Assembly of Kerala
- Krisha Kurup, Indian actress
- M. R. Kurup, Indian rocket scientist
- N. Peethambara Kurup (born 1942), Indian politician
- Nagavally R. S. Kurup (1917–2003), Indian writer, commentator and broadcaster
- Neena Kurup (born 1967), Indian actress
- P. N. V. Kurup (1925–2018), Indian Ayurveda practitioner, researcher and writer
- P. R. Kurup (1915–2001), Indian socialist politician
- P. Narayana Kurup (born 1934), Malayalam poet
- Pran Kurup (1966–2016), Indian entrepreneur and author
- Saiju Kurup (born 1979), Malayalam film actor
- Satheesh Kurup (born 1981), Indian cinematographer
- Shishir Kurup (born 1961), American actor
- Sooraj S. Kurup (born 1989), Indian composer and film actor
- Sukumara Kurup (born 1946), Indian criminal
- Vennikkulam Gopala Kurup (1902–1980), Indian poet, playwright, translator, lexicographer and story writer

== See also ==
- Kurup (film), Indian biographical film about Sukumara Kurup
