= Pallikoodam =

Malayalam and Tamil word that denotes a village school

Pallikoodam or Ezhuthupally Pally is a word in Malayalam and Tamil that denotes a school. These were mostly village schools run by individual teachers (Ezhuthu pally Aashaans or Asans or Gurus) and were distinct from Kalaris that taught martial arts.

== Etymology ==
The real meaning of Pallikkoodam is a sacred place for education. In medieval Kerala, Jain Derasars and Buddhist viharas were known as 'Ezhuthupally. When Budha bhiskhus started small schools, they were called Pallikkoodam. A generally accepted explanation of the etymology of this Malayalam word is that it is a blend word formed out of two Malayalam words Palli and Koodam. The word Palli means small village in Tamil, Sanskrit & Malayalam. Koodam means Gathering in Tamil and Malayalam. Pallikoodam means village gathering.

The Malayalam word for Mosque and Church is also later referred to as "Palli" as they borrowed these words.

In Keral, Tamil Nadu, and Sri Lanka village schools are called Pallikoodam (Sri Lankan Tamil).

== Types ==
There were different forms of Pallikoodams that were established across Kerala offering different levels of education, with some regional variations. Kudippallikoodam was by far the most important, popular and wide spread form, since most of the students except clerics, priests or scholarly professionals would usually stop after receiving elementary education and start working on their professions.

=== Kudippallikoodam ===
Kudippallikoodam (കുടിപ്പള്ളിക്കൂടം) also known as 'Aashan Pallikoodam' (ആശാൻ പള്ളിക്കൂടം) was a popular form of schooling. This was an indigenous elementary schooling method where an instructor or aashan (ആശാൻ) would teach young children about alphabets, numbers, elementary arithmetic, writing as well as general aspects of life such as personal discipline, cleanliness, morality and general knowledge. Young students are initially trained in writing by making them write on the sand. Once they are comfortable with writing on sand, the students would upgrade themselves to reporting on the standard writing medium i.e. palm leaves (Thaliyola or Palm-leaf manuscripts) as the writing material and iron pen (Narayam) as the writing instrument (stylus) to scribe on them.

In the 20th century CE, the writing medium mostly got upgraded into wooden slates and chalk. This continued to be the case until the system almost entirely died out by the dawn of the 21st century CE.

== Revival Efforts ==
Recent efforts have been undertaken to revive traditional teaching methods and tools. A noteworthy example is an initiative titled Malayalam Pallikoodam proposed by the famous Malayalam Poet V Madhusoodanan Nair. This initiative tried to revive the use of wooden slates instead of paper notebooks and pencils for teaching Malayalam and has received significant attention from parents.

== See also ==
- Education in Kerala
- Institute of Human Resources Development
- List of educational institutions in Kerala
- Narayam, the writing instrument used to write on palm leaf-based documents.
- Palm-leaf manuscript
