= V. R. Krishnan Ezhuthachan =

Indian freedom fighter

Member of Cochin Legislative Council
- In office 1945–1948

Member of Travancore-Cochin Legislative Assembly
- In office 1952–1954
- Rajpramukh: Chithira Thirunal Balarama Varma
- Preceded by: Position Created
- Succeeded by: Sivarama Bharathy
- Constituency: Nemmara

Personal details
- Born: 25 April 1909 Avinissery, Thrissur, Kingdom of Cochin, British India
- Died: 13 May 2004 (aged 95) Thrissur, Kerala, India
- Party: Indian National Congress
- Spouse: P.K.Lakshmi Bhai
- Children: Three daughters and Four sons
- Education: Government Law College, Thiruvananthapuram

Vadakkoot Raman Krishnan Ezhuthachan (1909–2004) was an Indian freedom fighter, Gandhian, journalist, trade unionist and Indian National Congress leader from Thrissur city in Kerala, India. Ezhuthachan was the founder general secretary of the Kochi Rajya Prajamandalam party which was constituted on 26 January 1941. He is also founder of the now defunct Deenabandhu daily published from Thrissur.

== Personal life ==
V. R. Krishnan Ezhuthachan was born in Avinissery, Thrissur on 25 April 1909. As the tenth son of Vadakkoot Nelliparambil Raman Ezhuthachan and Njarasseri valappil Lakshmi amma. He completed his primary education from ezhuthupura (old traditional village school) which functioned in his own home.

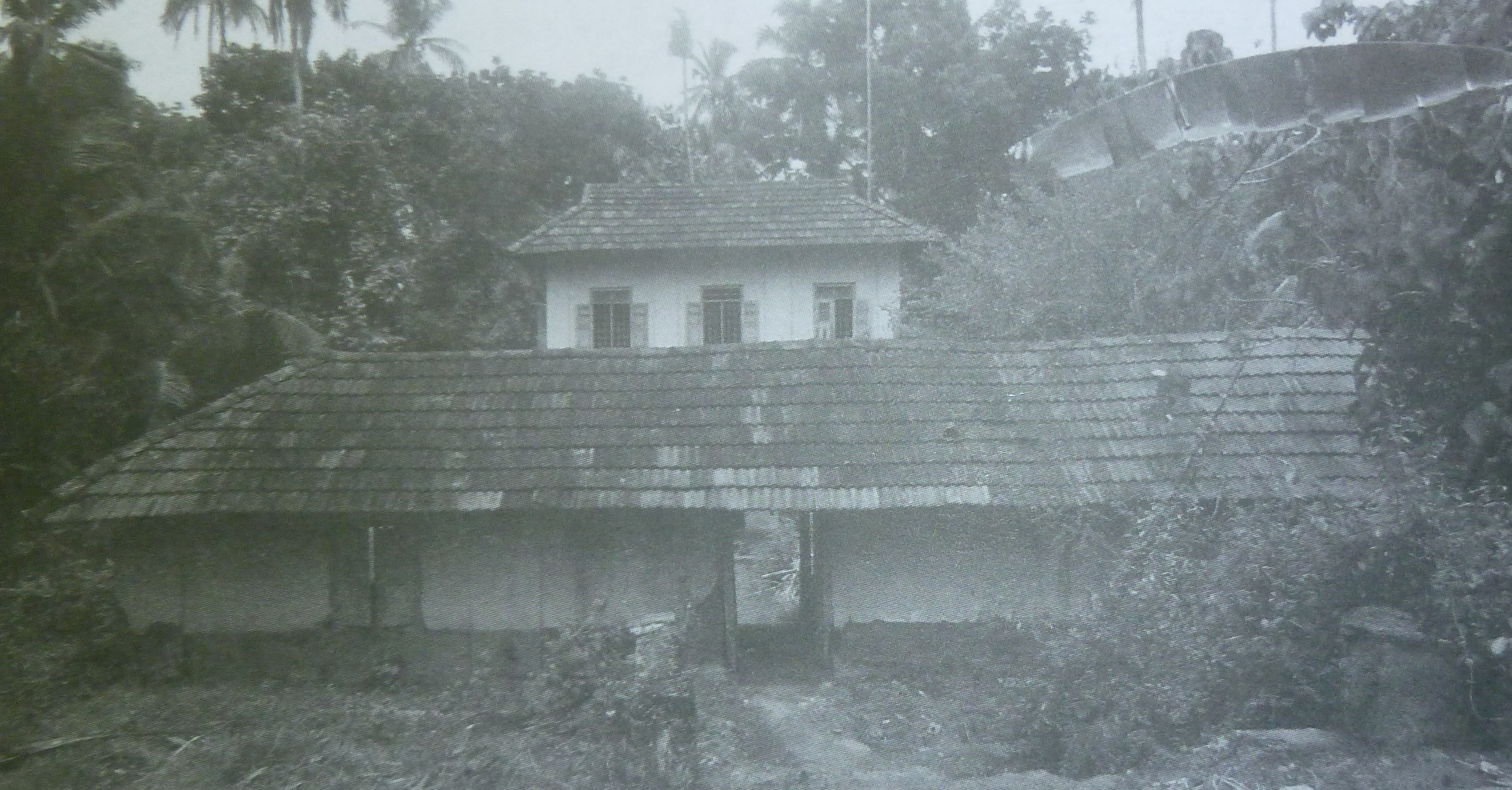
Ezhuthachan's home at Avinissery, Thrissur

After passing the 10th grade securing a gold medal, he completed graduation in economics and law (BL) by securing rank. When Gandhiji arrived Thrissur in 1925, Ezhuthachan met him and then stepped into the freedom struggle. P. Kumaran Ezhuthachan, an active member of the Cochin State Congress Party, was his mentor in politics. With the formation and activities of Kochi Rajya Prajamandalam, Ezhuthachan made his own identity in the field of politics.

=== The formation of Kochi Rajya Prajamandalam ===
A group of young people who were displeased with the functioning of political movements in the erstwhile Kochi state, in the meeting held on 26 January 1941 under the leadership of Ezhuthachan, decided to form the Kochi Rajya Prajamandalam. 'To end the sovereignty of Cochin king and to form responsible government' was the main objective. On 9 February 1941 Prajamandalam formed with Ezhuthachan as founder general secretary.

To help the people of the Kingdom of Cochin from ravages caused due to the flooding in 1941, Prajamandalam formed the Cochin flood relief committee; Ezhuthachan and C. Achutha Menon were secretaries. Ezhuthachan actively worked in this organisation by collecting donations and distributing brochures about calamities throughout the Kingdom of Cochin.

==== Cochin karshaka sabha ====
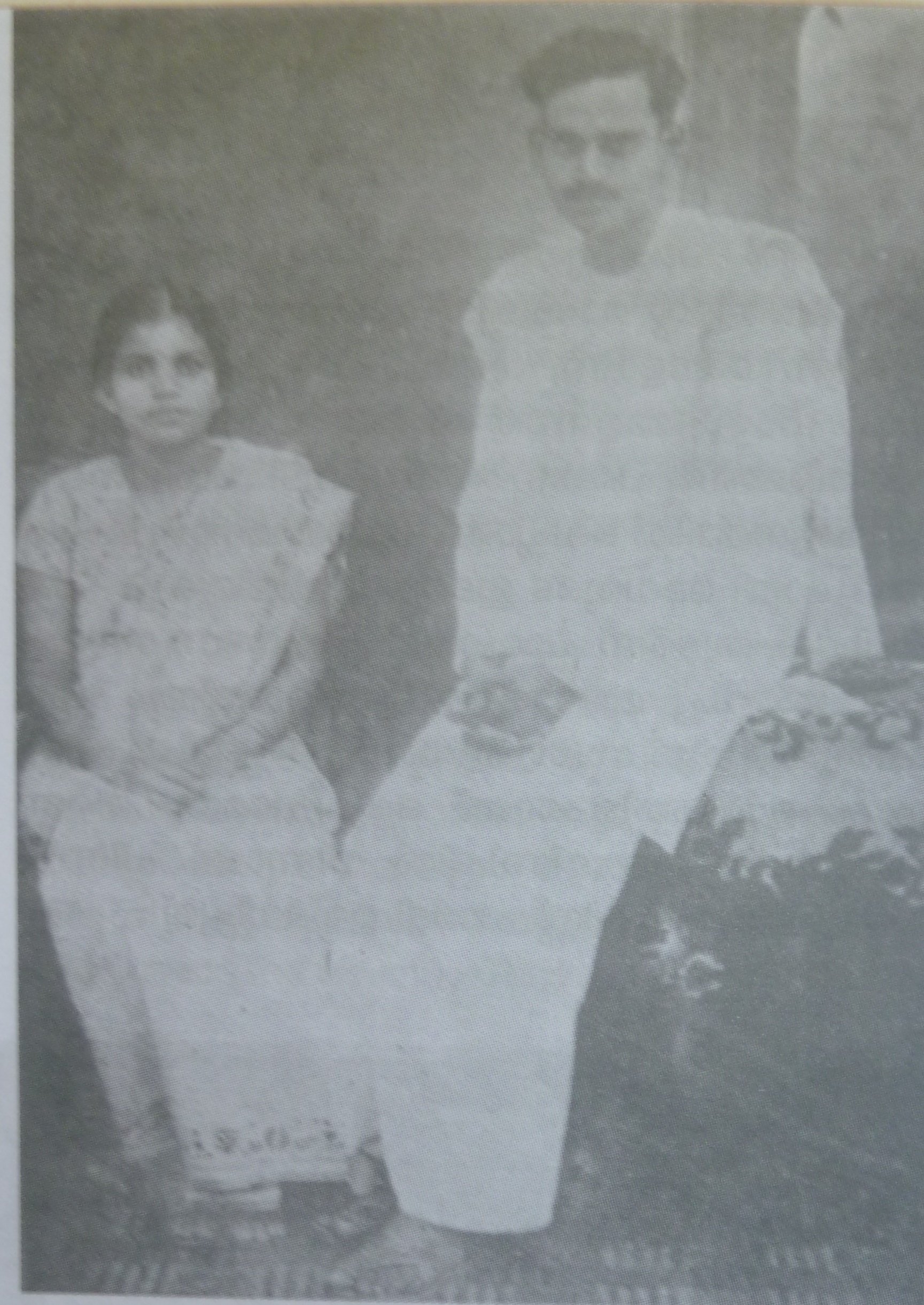
Ezhuthachan and his wife Lakshmi Bhai

With the objective of ending difficulties faced by farmers due to feudalism, an organisation called Cochin karshaka sabha formed with Ezhuthachan as president and C. Achutha Menon as secretary. Brochures about the difficulties of farmers were distributed by the organisation. Cochin karshaka sabha stood for permanent ownership for farmers in their field. Their protests caused acceptance of the verumpatta kudiyan bill on 13 February 1943 at the Cochin Legislative Council. In 1944, part of the restructuring of the Prajamandalam, Communist sympathizers abandoned membership in Prajamandalam. After this incident Cochin karshaka sabha was divided into two, with All Cochin Kisan Congress with Ezhuthachan as its leader and Cochin Karshaka sabha with C. Achutha Menon as its leader. Later All Cochin Kisan Congress merged to All India Kisan Congress.

In January 1942 Prajamandalam decided to conduct the first annual meeting at Irinjalakuda. Diwan A. F. W. Dixon banned it due to the resentment caused towards the king by the activities of Prajamandalam and karshaka sabha. As a consequence of the ban, many leaders of Praja Mandala were arrested, including Ezhuthachan. Leaders who came forward to conduct the meeting were arrested at the meeting place by the police sent by Diwan. Leaders like K. Karunakaran were arrested and faced brutal torture in jail.

Avinissery was one of the main weaving centres of Thrissur. Ezhuthachan actively worked in the Cochi khadhi grama vyavasaya association, an organisation to spread the use of khadi. He also worked actively in the formation of khadi weaving centres in Thrissur and Ernakulam.

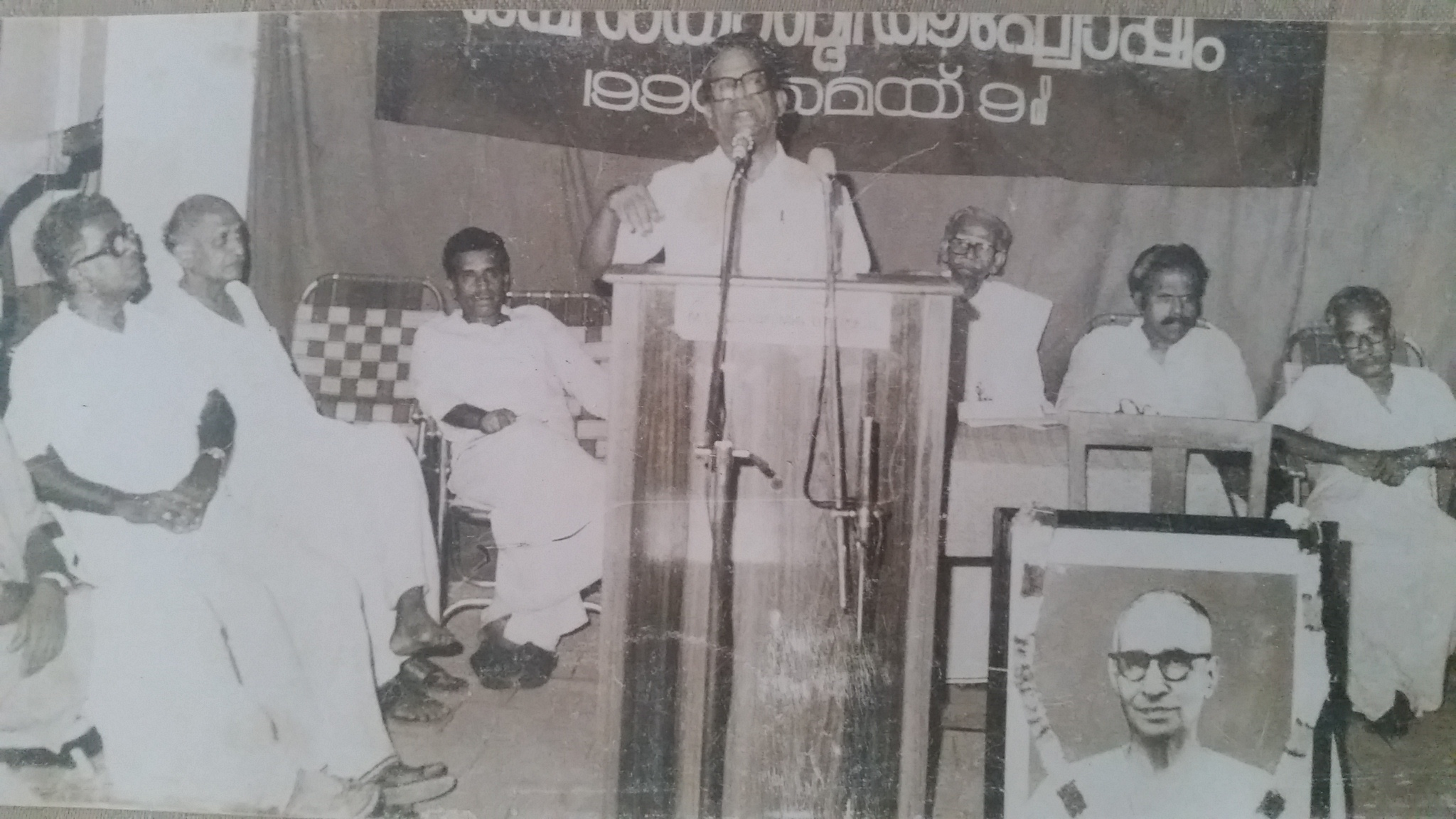
Ezhuthachan (third from right), with P. P. George and P. A. Madhavan at INTUC meeting

In connection with the Quit India movement, on 5 August 1942 a conference was conducted under the leadership of Gandhiji and Nehru for All India Congress Committee at Bombay. Ezhuthachan and S.Neelakanda Iyer attended the conference by representing Prajamandalam. As part of the Quit India movement Prajamandalam actively participated in strikes. During that time there was a strong ban in functioning of the press, Prajamandalam started a newspaper called Deenabandhu with Ezhuthachan as editor-in-chief.

With the intention of saving people from financial crisis caused due to the Second World War, an organisation called Gramasevakasamgham was formed. Ezhuthachan worked as secretary of this organisation in Thrissur. During the spread of fifth fever and cholera, Gramasevakasamgham actively worked to prevent its spread.

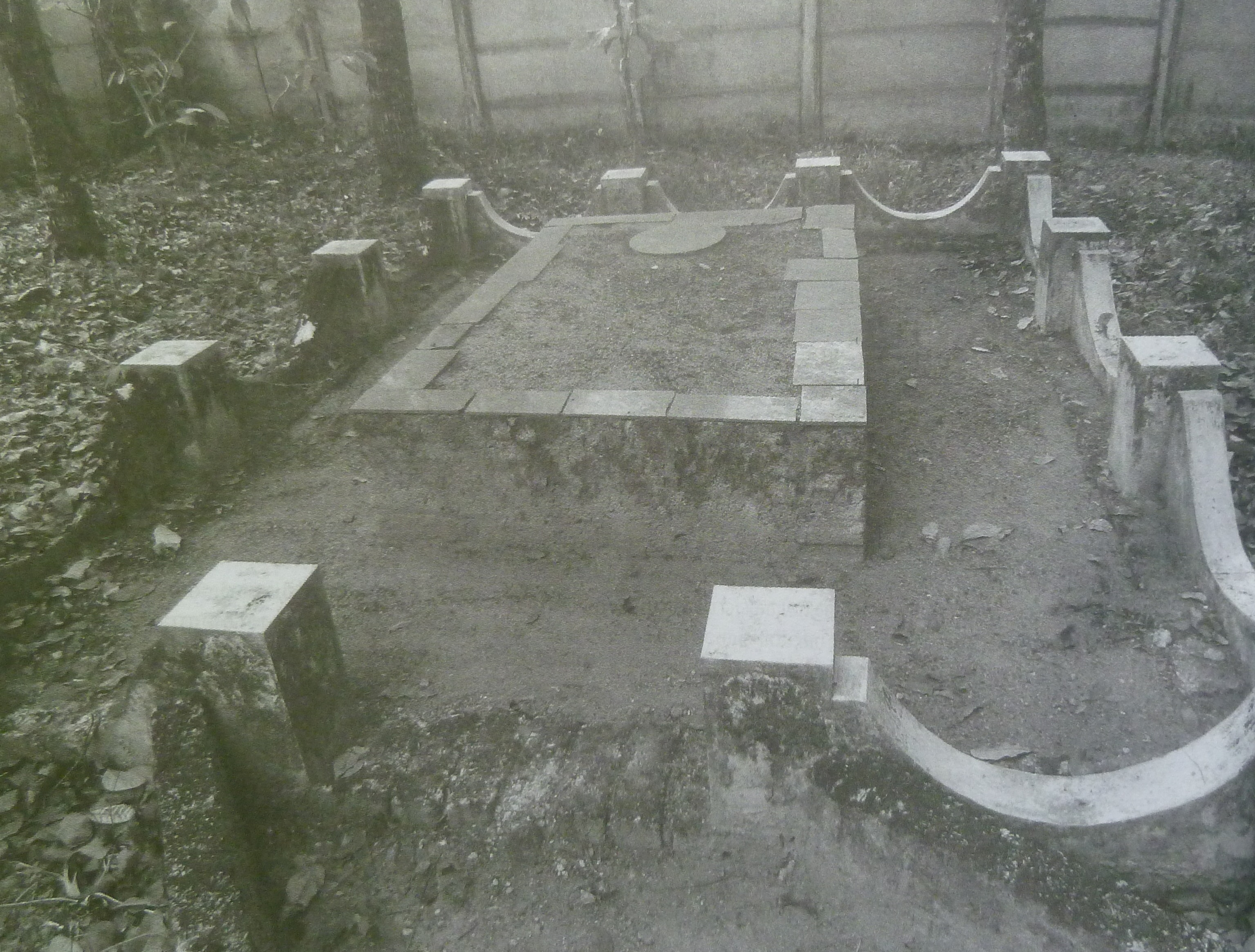
Ezhuthachan's samadhi at Avinissery, Thrissur

When Prajamandalam decided to face election in 1945, Ezhuthachan was unanimously elected to the Cochin Legislative Council. Ezhuthachan was a member of the Travancore-Cochin legislative council representing Nemmara.

Ezhuthachan married Lakshmi Bhai, daughter of his political mentor and active congress politician P. Kumaran Ezhuthachan. He died in 2004 at the age of 95 due to age-related diseases.

In 2009 as a part of V.R. Krishnan Ezhuthachan's Janmashadabdhi (birth centennial) celebration, M.P. Veerendra Kumar received the V.R. Krishananezhuthachan Janmashadabdhi Award. Ezhuthachan gave leadership to a caste-based organisation called Ezhuthachan samajam. To honor his activity, a law college founded by Ezhuthachan samajam was named after him.

== Recognition ==
The nation honored Ezhuthachan with Thamarapathra for his excellent service in the Indian independence movement. Other major awards include the University of Madras Award for the study Gramoddharanam in 1931. He was given the Sadanandan Award and Prof. K. M. Chandy Award for contributions in the field of cooperative movement in India. Ezhuthachan was also given Swathanthra kanakopaharam by the Kerala Press Foundation, the Ramasrama award for excellent service in the social and literature fields, the Thissur Sahrudaya Vedhi award, and the Tomyas award.

== Literature ==
Ezhuthachan has contributions in the field of literature also; he was a poet. He received the Kerala Sahitya Akademi award for his autobiography V.R.Krishnan Ezhuthachan: aathmakadha in 2000.

=== Other works ===
- Gramoddhaaranam
- Aashayaanjali
- Gandhi Jinna Kathukal (translation)
- Vishwacharithraavalokanam (translation of Glimpses of World History by Jawaharlal Nehru)
- Indiayile vargeeya thrikonam (translation of Ashok Metha's Communal triangle)
- Kochikkoru abhivruddhi paddhathi
- Niyamasabhaprasangangal (compilation of Krishnan Ezhuthachan's speeches in legislative assembly)

In addition, Ezhuthachan co-authored a book named Kochi rajya charithram about the history of the Kingdom of Cochin.
