= P. Narayana Menon =

Diwan of Cochin

Diwan of Cochin
- In office 1922–1925
- Monarch: Rama Varma XVI
- Preceded by: T. Vijayaraghavacharya
- Succeeded by: T. S. Narayana Iyer

P. Narayana Menon was an Indian lawyer, politician and administrator who served as the diwan of the Cochin kingdom from 1922 to 1925.

== Early life ==
Narayana Menon was born in the town of Ernakulam and had his education in Ernakulam and Madras. He studied law and on completion of his graduation, began a legal practice.

== As Diwan of Cochin ==
In 1922, Narayana Menon succeeded T. Vijayaraghavacharya as the Diwan of Cochin. During his tenure, the first Legislative Council of Cochin was formed.

== Later career ==
Narayana Menon was active in politic throughout his life. During the unification of Travancore and Cochin in 1947, Menon represented Cochin's interests and successfully campaigned for the Cochin Chief Court at Ernakulam to be considered for the High Court of Travancore-Cochin.

He was elected to the Travancore-Cochin assembly and represented the constituency of Ernakulam in the assembly.
