= Amala Menon =

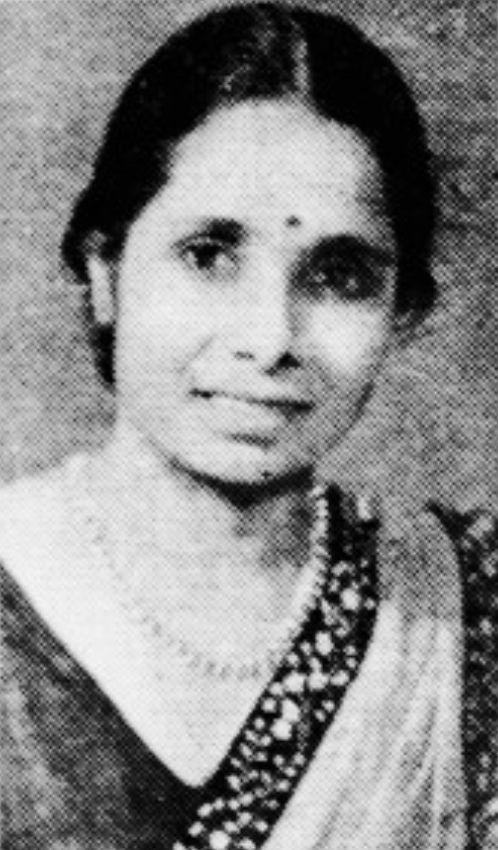
Menon in 1951

Amala Menon (1902 – 1998) was a women's leader in Singapore. She was the founder of the Lotus Club, an early club for Indian and Ceylonese women, and the founding president of its successor, the Kamala Club.

== Career ==
Menon served on the Cochin Legislative Council in Kochi, India before returning to Singapore after the war. In 1931, she and B. C. Handy founded the Indian and Ceylonese Ladies' Club, which was renamed the Lotus Club in the following year. She served as its honorary secretary, and later as its president.

In May 1951, the Lotus Club merged with the Ladies' Union, another Indian and Ceylonese women's club in Singapore, to form the Kamala Club, on the suggestion of Indian Prime Minister Jawaharlal Nehru during his visit to Singapore in May 1950. Menon was appointed the president of the Kamala Club, and a farewell function was held for her on the club's official opening day as she was leaving Singapore on a trip. In her absence, she was replaced as president by Mrs. M. M. Namazie.

She was the secretary of the International Fortnightly Club, a member of the Family Planning Committee, a Juvenile Adviser in the Juvenile Court, a librarian at the Tan Tock Seng Hospital and the entertainments organiser of the Ramakrishna Mission Singapore. She was also the chairman of the Relief Commission established by the Singaporean branch of the British Red Cross in response to the 1950 Assam–Tibet earthquake.

== Personal life ==
Menon was the sister of N. Raghavan and the wife of Kizhakke Mukkapuzha Raman Menon, a Mathematics lecturer at Raffles College. She and her husband left for Chennai in March 1955.
