= Travancore Legislative Council =

Governing body of the princely state of Travancore

The Travancore Legislative Council was the governing body of the Travancore princely state from 1888 to 1932. This legislature was the first opportunity in post-medieval India for non-royal natives to interfere, at least to some extent, with the sovereignty of princely states or imperial powers. Shri Moolam Tirunal Rama Varma, the Maharaja (King) of Travancore, is considered as the first Indian ruler to implement the concept of public participation in governance through the formation of this council. After passing through many stages of evolution, this assembly later became the basic framework of the Kerala Legislature and is considered to became the core of the legislative system of Kerala itself, which became a state in independent India.

== Formation ==
The Travancore Legislative Council came into existence on 30 March 1888 through an order issued by Maharaja Shri Moolam Tirunal. The proclamation stipulated a committee of eight members, including not less than two non-official members, for a term of three years. On 23 August 1888, in the first meeting chaired by the then Dewan T. Ram Rao himself, there were five official members and three non-official members. The council was chaired by the Diwan. Provision was made to appoint a vice-chairman temporarily in his absence.

== Objectives ==
Such a council was formed for the first time among the six hundred princely states that existed in India. The role of the council was to advise the king and his staff on legislation. The rules framed by the committee came into force after receiving the approval of the King. The King himself had the final authority to enact such laws. The council had no authority to check whether the said laws were being effectively implemented or to take any further action. But even with those limitations, the Travancore Legislative Council is considered now as a first step towards a democratic process involving the public.

== Development and evolution ==
At the same time as the formation of the council, important historical changes were also taking place in Travancore in the community and social sphere. It was in the same year that Sree Narayanaguru performed Shiva pratishtha at Aruvipuram. In 1891, a huge petition signed by about ten thousand people was presented to the Maharaja. Known as the Malayali Memorial or the Travancore Memorial, this massive petition protested against the policy of considering only foreign Brahmins, mainly from Tamil Nadu in government service and demanded that the common people also get representation in government jobs. Indian National Congress leader G. P Pillai, historian C.V. Ramanpilla, KP Shankaramenon, K.C Shadananan Nair and other social reformers like Palpu and youths of different castes and religions were behind this petition. The Tamil Brahmin community, not amused by the presentation of the Malayali memorial, soon submitted a counter-memorial to the king, refuting all its arguments.

During this time, Swami Vivekananda, who visited Kerala, had heard from Palpu about the customs of untouchability in Kerala. Vivekananda suggested Palpu to unite the community under a real ascetic as a solution to the problems experienced by the Ezhava community. Along with this, in May 1895, Dr. Palpu himself submitted a petition to Dewan Shankarasubbayar. Also, in September 1896, a huge petition signed by 13176 members of the Ezhava community was also presented to the Maharaja under his leadership. The petition was known as Ezhava Memorial Petition.

Swami Vivekananda, who came to Kerala for his second visit, started efforts to bring the caste problem in Kerala to the attention of the British Parliament. As the customs and caste system that existed in Kerala became a serious topic of discussion in the British Parliament, the Kingdom of Travancore was forced to find some solution in this regard. As a result, Kumaranashan, Ayyankali and others were nominated to the council. In 1919 a significant change took place in the Legislative Council. The membership of the council was increased to 25, giving more representation, power and responsibilities to the people. A provision was made to appoint three of the 11 non-official members by nomination and the remaining eight by direct election of the people. Firstly, the committee members had an opportunity to discuss the annual budget and ask questions. A maximum of three questions per person was fixed in one session. Also, members had no right to ask sub-questions or move motions. Later, after the amendments of 1922, these rights were also granted.

In October 1921, the council was again developed and the new composition was 22 nominees out of 50 and 7 non-officials. Only those who paid Rs.5 as land tax or labor tax and graduates got the right to vote for members.

In 1922, women were allowed to vote and be elected. With this doctor Mary Poonen Lukose became the first woman to be nominated to any legislative assembly in India.Elections to the council were held on 22 April 1922, 14 May 1925, 27–28 May 1928 and 20, 23 May 1931. It was during this jurisdiction that the Nair Regulation of 1925 and the Ezhava Regulation were passed.

In 1930 the council's powers were once again extended. With this, the council got full freedom of expression.

The regulation issued by Srichitra Tirunal Maharaja on 28 October 1932 led to the complete dismantling of the existing legislative system. It was decided that the Praja Sabha and the Legislative Council should function as two chambers of the legislature. With that, the Travancore Legislative Council was abolished and replaced by an Upper House called the Srichithira State Council as part of the new bicameral system.

== See also ==
- Cochin Legislative Council
