= Kerala State Electronics Development Corporation =

Electronic enterprise in Kerala, India

KELTRON
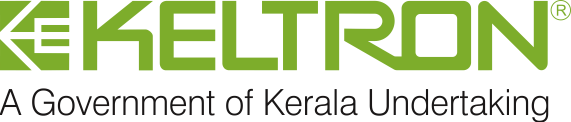
- Type: State-owned enterprise
- Industry: Electronics, Information Technology
- Founded: Thiruvananthapuram, Kerala, India in (1973)
- Founder: K. P. P. Nambiar
- Headquarters: Thiruvananthapuram, Kerala, India
- Area served: India
- Key people: Sreekumar Nair, V.A. Rtd. (Managing Director); S. Hemachandran, Executive Director; S. Vijayan Pillai, Technical Director
- Owner: Electronics & Information Technology Department, Government of Kerala
- Website: www.keltron.org

KELTRON’s history is a saga of innovation in electronics. From being a pioneer in 1973, to the role of a trend-setter today, Keltron has been the catalysis for the development of electronics industry in Kerala.

Kerala State Electronics Development Corporation Limited (KELTRON) is an electronic enterprise situated in Trivandrum, Kerala, India. It was founded in 1973 by K. P. P. Nambiar.

== Locations ==
Units of KELTRON are in the following cities of India:

- Thiruvananthapuram (corporate head office and factory), Kerala
- Kannur, Kerala
- Aroor, Kerala
- Calicut, Kerala
- Kuttippuram, Kerala
- Kochi, Kerala
- Thrissur, Kerala
- New Delhi
- Bangalore, Karnataka
- Ahmedabad, Gujarat
- Mumbai, Maharatra
- Kolkata
- Chennai, Tamil Nadu

== Keltron Knowledge Services Group ==
Keltron Knowledge Services Group a business unit under IT Business Group of Keltron, was formed in the year 1999 with the intention of imparting technical education at an affordable rate to the students in Kerala. Its mission is to set a higher benchmark in IT, ITeS & Computer education segment, provide quality education and emerge as a center of excellence in IT education and Knowledge services arena.

The courses offered have gained significant acceptance within the student community, and the training model is well-regarded for its practical focus. In addition to the regular skill development programs, KELTRON runs internship programs that engage approximately 10,000 students annually, further enhancing their learning experience.

Our efforts in the past 25 years have earned recognition by the Ministry of Minority Affairs, National Institute of Electronics & Information Technology (NIELIT), Vikram Sarabai Space Centre (VSSC), NORKA Roots, Scheduled Caste Development Department, Scheduled Tribe Development Department, Vocational Higher Secondary Education, Sreenaranayaguru Open University and Multi-National Companies like UST Global, Quest Global etc. These recognitions have resulted in certain Short Term Training Schemes for Keltron Knowledge Services Group and enhanced our position in equipping a segment of educated and unemployed youth of Kerala with the Right Skills to make them employable and Industry Ready Professionals.

Major training domains are:

- Artificial Intelligence/Data Science/Business Analytics/Machine Learning
- Augmented Reality/Virtual Reality (AR/VR)/New Media
- Logistics & Supply Chain Management/Warehouse Management
- Fire & Safety/LIFT Technology/ Fibre Optics/Health, Safety & Environment
- Computer Hardware/Networking/ e-Gadget Technologies/Wireless Networking/ Laptop Chip Level Servicing/CCTV/ Mobile Phone Technology/ CAD/CAM/CNC-Lathe/CNC-Milling/ Internet of Things(IoT)/Embedded System /Cloud Computing
- Multimedia & Animation/ Graphic Design/Audio-Video Editing/ Visual Effects/ Digital Film Making/ Digital Photography
- Architecture Design/ Furniture & Interior Design/Advertisement Design
- Medical Records/ Medical Coding Technician/Medical Transcription/ Hospital Administration
- Television Journalism/ Digital Journalism/ Sound Engineering /Montessori Teacher Training
- Computerized Financial Accounting/ Indian & Foreign Accounting
- Digital Marketing / Full Stack Developer/ UI/UX Designer

== Keltron Knowledge Centres ==
Keltron Knowledge Centres are Centres of Excellence in Information Technology created with the specific intention of bridging the huge gap between Academic Institutions and the Industry. These Centres churn out batches of industry-ready professionals every year who are prepped up to take on jobs the moment they are inducted. The career-oriented courses are delivered through Keltron Knowledge Centres. Keltron, being a part of the industry, has the right feel of the requirements of the industry and has used this knowledge in designing courses that suit the industry requirements.

Keltron has also started Knowledge Centres as an initiative to support youth to develop skills in fields like IT, ITeS and Computer Education.

== Keltron Knowledge Centre Locations ==
Keltron Knowledge Centres operate across Kerala under the Keltron Knowledge Services Group.

- Alappuzha
- Ernakulam
- Idukki
- Kannur
- Kasaragod
- Kollam
- Kottayam
- Kozhikode
- Malappuram
- Palakkad
- Pathanamthitta
- Thiruvananthapuram
- Thrissur
- Wayanad
