= Deenabandhu =

Malayalam language newspaper

- Type: Daily and weekly newspaper
- Format: Broadsheet
- Owner: V. R. Krishnan Ezhuthachan
- Publisher: V. R. Krishnan Ezhuthachan
- Editor-in-chief: V. R. Krishnan Ezhuthachan
- Political alignment: Neo-liberal, Pro-Congress
- Language: Malayalam
- Headquarters: Thrissur

Deenabandhu is a defunct Malayalam language newspaper printed daily and published from the Thrissur city, Kerala in India. The newspaper was the first periodicals published from Kingdom of Cochin which supported the Indian Independence Movement.

== History ==
Deenabandhu was started as a weekly on 26 January 1941 from Thrissur city with V. R. Krishnan Ezhuthachan as editor-in-chief. The newspaper was named after Charles Freer Andrews, known affectionately as Deenbandhu or Friend of the Poor, a name given by Mahatma Gandhi for his contributions to the Indian Independence Movement. Majority of the news came from the political movements from the Kochi state. The paper was also official organ of the Cochin Prajamandalam. During the Quit India Movement, the Editor and the staff were imprisoned. Later, the Deenabandu resumed publication in 1944 after the release of its staff from jail. In January 1946, the Deenabandu was turned into a daily newspaper and was shifted to Ernakulam. In 1962 due to financial difficulties, Deenabandu ceased publication.
