= Kalari =

Traditional training space used for Kalaripayattu

A kalari (Malayalam: [kɐɭɐɾi]) is a gymnasium or training space primarily associated with the martial art of Kalaripayattu. The word kalari comes from Malayalam. In the past, village schools in kerala, typically run by the traditional astrologer families, were known as kalari. Later schools for teaching language and grammar were known as Ezhuthu Kalari.

== Kalari teachers ==
The teacher of a kalari is called a Gurukkal or Asan. Teachers of Ezhuthu Kalari or Ezhuthu Palli are referred to as Asan or Ezhuthassan.

== Construction of a kalari ==
Traditionally, the kalari is constructed by digging a hollow in the ground, forming a sunken area four feet in depth, forty-two feet in length and twenty-one feet in breadth. This is usually called kuzhikalari. Kuzhi means "portions formed by caving in the earth" in Malayalam. The entrance to the Kalari is in the east, to let in the morning sunlight, and leads into the 42-foot leg running east–west while the 21-foot leg runs north–south. Another consideration taken when constructing the kalari is that it is built in the south-west side of the main plot. The floor of the kalari is leveled using mud. In southern and central Kerala, some kalaris were constructed in a circular form, with weapons and other instruments being placed on one end, and students sitting outside the circular arc to watch the training.

== Ankakalari and ankathattu ==
Ankathattu is a 4 to 6 foot high platform constructed temporarily for the purpose of fighting duels. Ankam means war in Malayalam. This platform is constructed as per tradition and is in the center of the ground from where people can watch the fight. The entire arrangement is called ankakalar. Historically, in Kerala, quarrels between local rulers were resolved by fixing an ankam, a duel to the death, between two ankachekavars, each ruler being represented by one ankachekavar. The ruler represented by the surviving ankachekavar was considered the winner.
