= V. J. Mathai =

Indian politician (1901–1954)

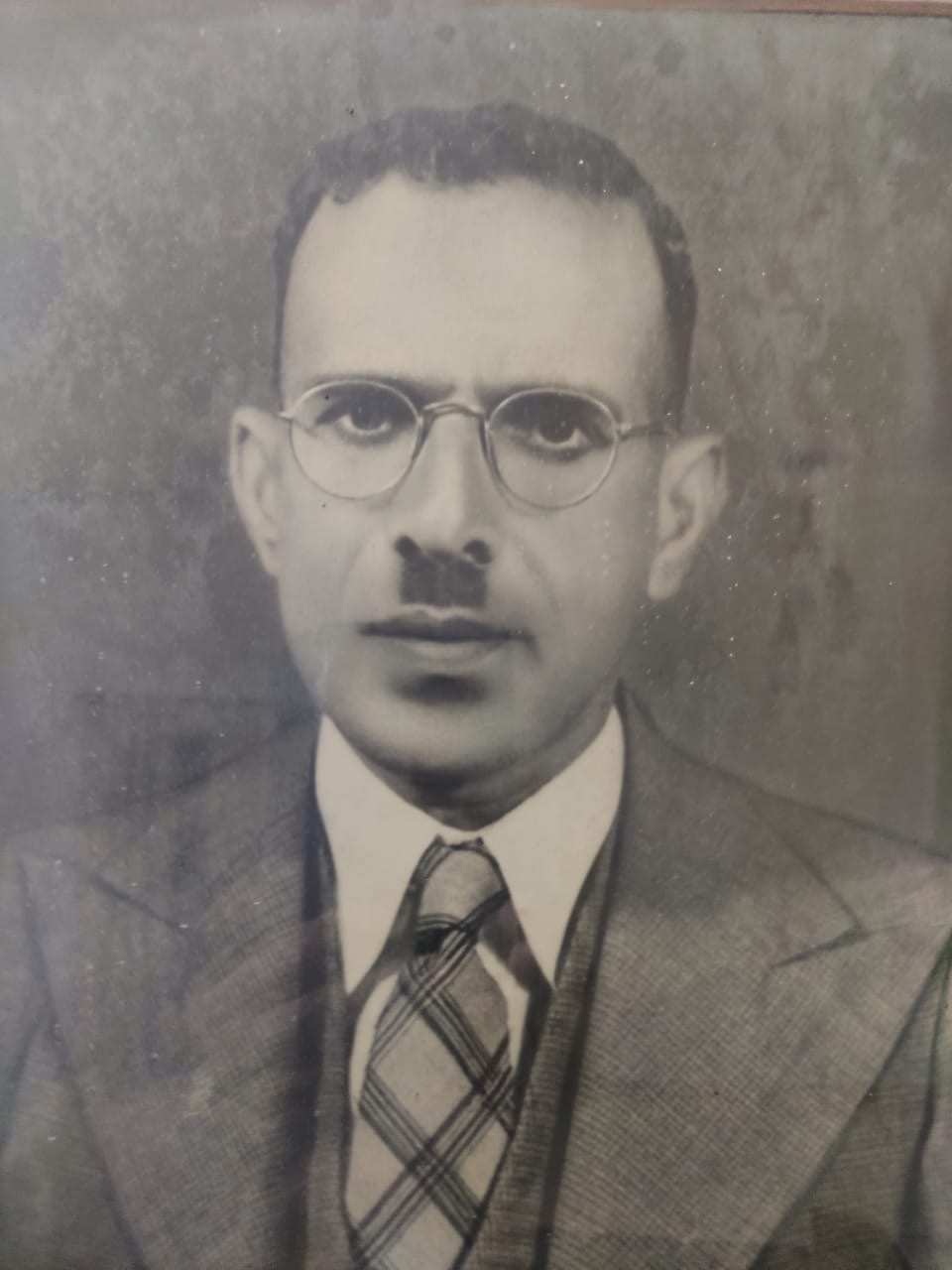
- Mathai c. 1948

Member of the Cochin Legislative Council
- In office 1938–1945
- Preceded by: H. J. Valmesly
- Constituency: Planters

Personal details
- Born: Vettath John Mathai; 25 February 1901 Mulanthuruthy, Kingdom of Cochin, British India
- Died: 5 August 1954 (aged 53) Assam, India

Vettath John Mathai (25 February 1901 – 5 August 1954), also known as "The Lion of Cochin", was an Indian politician who was a member of the Cochin Legislative Council from 1938 to 1945, representing the plantation-owning class. He is best known for being the first Indian to defeat a European in a democratic election in Indian history.

== Early life ==
Mathai was born to a Malayalee Syrian Christian Vettath family in Mulanthuruthy village. At the time, Mulanthuruthy was part of the Kingdom of Cochin, a princely state under the British Raj.

Being one of five sons, his father, John obtained a loan from an acquaintance to have Mathai and his brothers educated. With these funds, Mathai took his graduate and law degrees from Madras.

== Political career ==
As a lawyer, Mathai was known for his criticism of British colonial rule.

According to contemporary accounts, E. M. S. Namboodiripad, who later became the first Chief Minister of Kerala, would travel several kilometres to attend Mathai's public speeches.

During the 1930s, voting rights in the princely state of Cochin were restricted by property qualifications, with eligibility limited to individuals owning at least 300 acres of land. In the 1937 election, Mathai contested against H. J. Valmesly in the planters' constituency and won by a margin of one vote. The victory made him the first Indian to defeat a European candidate in an election to a legislative body in Cochin.

As a legislator, Mathai advocated measures for the protection of approximately 4,500 temples in the Cochin State and supported the allocation of public funds for their maintenance.

During his tenure as a legislator, Mathai introduced or supported a number of bills and cut motions relating to public welfare and administration. These included proposals to expand the availability of midwives in rural areas and prohibit hospitals from charging poor patients for essential services, measures to investigate and control the spread of malaria, and initiatives to regulate lotteries and chit funds (known locally as kuries).

He also advocated policies aimed at improving conditions in the plantation sector, including simplifying licensing procedures, developing roads, canals, and irrigation infrastructure, and restricting the import of Burmese rubber. In addition, Mathai opposed proposals to introduce communal quotas in government appointments, instead supporting a merit-based and secular system. He also opposed the introduction of English into the school curriculum, arguing that the state's limited financial resources should be directed toward other educational priorities.

Mathai was associated with several social welfare initiatives. He sold approximately 300 acres of land in Nelliyampathy and another 50 acres in Arakunnam, using the proceeds to assist women from economically disadvantaged and socially marginalised communities with marriage expenses.

He was also involved in a number of business ventures. He was among the founders of the Cochin Commercial Bank and contributed to the early development of rubber cultivation in Kerala by importing rubber seeds and establishing plantations covering approximately 110 acres on his own estates. In addition, he played a role in facilitating the transport of coal from Kolkata to Kerala by rail.

== Personal life and other pursuits ==
He was the brother-in-law of K. E. Mammen, father-in-law of surgeon Thomas Thomas, and son-in-law of K. C. Eapen (of Travancore National Bank).

== Later life and death ==
He was given an opportunity to procure cheap land in Dibrugarh district of Assam, where he was ostensibly running a sugarcane plantation.

He died in Assam on 5 August 1954.

== Legacy ==
In 2010, his portrait was unveiled at the Council Hall of the Ernakulam Law College.

In 2010, the Kerala Postal Circle ran a special cover to commemorate him.

In 2015, a road in Cochin was named after him.
