= Ambat Sivarama Menon =

Indian politician (1878–1939)

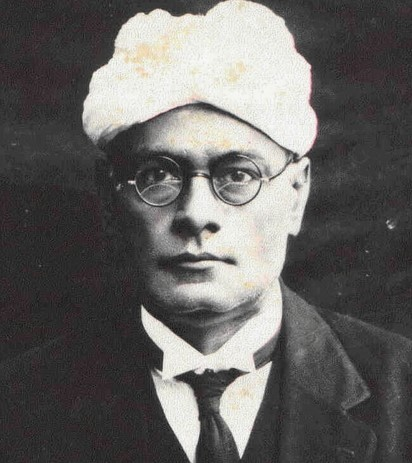

First Elected Minister of an Indian State
- In office 17 June 1938 – 30 August 1938

Personal details
- Born: 1878
- Died: August 30, 1938 (aged 59–60)
- Spouse: Pallissery Thekke Komarath Kalyanikutty Amma
- Children: 6 sons and 3 daughters

Ambat Sivarama Menon was a pre-independence Indian politician. He was the first elected minister of an Indian state.

Born in 1878, Menon was the second of four children and only son of Ambat Ikkali Amma and Champathil Nanu Mannadiar.

Graduating from Madras Law College, Menon practised at the Madras High Court. An authority on the Marumakkathayam law of succession, he served as examiner for the law degree examinations of Madras University.

Menon was a founders and president of the Triplicane Urban Co-Operative Society in Chennai, the first consumer cooperative in India. He was also a director of Cochin Land Mortgage Bank.

Menon was a founder of the Justice Party and the editor of the party's official newspaper, The Liberator. In 1936, when he was first elected to the Cochin Legislative Council from Mulakunnathukavu constituency, he retired from legal practice and settled down in Thrissur. Two years later, in the elections held under a new Constitution ushering in dyarchy, he was returned to the Assembly from Cheruthuruthy. As leader of the Cochin Congress, he was appointed Minister for Rural Development on June 17, 1938.

Menon died due to cardiac arrest on August 30, 1938, during an official visit to his hometown, Chittur.

Menon was married to Kalyanikutty Amma the daughter of Pallissery Thekke Komarath Parukutty Amma and Kavithilakan Kundur Narayana Menon. They had six sons and three daughters: Sri Sankara Narayanan, Satyabala, Ananda Padmanabhan, Bhagyanathan, Swarna Kumari, Chandrasekharan, Sarojini, Sivaraman and Sivadas. Smt. Kalyanikutty Amma died in March 1960.
