= Kaniyar =

South Indian caste

Regions with significant populations
- Malabar, Thrissur, Palakkad, Travancore.

Languages
- Malayalam

Religion
- Hinduism

Related ethnic groups
- Ganaka, Kalari Panicker , Thiyyar

Kaniyar (Ganaka) is a caste from the Indian state of Kerala. There are regional variations in the name used to define them. They are listed under the Other Backward Class (OBC) by the Kerala Government.

== Traditions of origin ==
Kathleen Gough has recorded that the caste believes that they descended from a section of the Tamil Brahmins and that they ascribed their "rudimentary" knowledge of Sanskrit, medicine and astrology to those origins.

== Traditional occupations ==
Gough says that the caste in many ways played the role of

pseudo-Brahmans in relation to the lower castes ... Their lore was, of course, a much simplified version of Brahman lore. Through them, however, some of the elements of Sanskrit religious belief and practices were filtered to lower caste people who could not attend high-caste temples or receive Brahmanical services ... [They] served as media for the Sankritisation of the lower castes ...

It was the Kaniyars who decorate the elaborate costumes. of the dance conducted at various temples in central Travancore. They were also famous in the field of ayurveda treatment (Traditional Indian medical stream) across Kerala. Kaniyar panickers are famous with astrology even now in Northern Kerala.

The Kaniyar were also once teachers, primarily in village schools. The arrival of the British in the area saw the demise of traditional teaching, with Sanskrit teaching being deprecated in favor of its English counterpart, disruption due to various wars and also a discouragement of the village schools in general. The standard of literacy declined greatly for nearly a century and began to improve once more with the advent of state aid for (principally English-based) education at the end of the 19th century.

Aside from general teaching, they also taught fencing to the Izhava and Thiyyar caste. Gurukkal is another name used for the northern group because of their involvement with these schools. They asserted that because of this they were superior to the Asan members of the caste, who were primarily to be found in southern Travancore.

== Notable people ==
- Niranam Poets – Madhava Panikkar, Sankara Panikkar, and Rama Panikkar Authoers of Kannassa Ramayanam.
