= Tirumalpur =

- town
- Location in Tamil Nadu, India Tirumalpur (India)
- Coordinates: 12.956634°N 79.673721°E
- Country: India
- State: Tamil Nadu
- District: Ranipet

Languages
  - Official: Tamil
- Time zone: UTC+5:30 (IST)
- PIN: 631051
- Vehicle registration: TN 21 (Kanchipuram RTO)

Tirumalpur is a temple town and a suburb of Kanchipuram, Tamil Nadu, with a train station on the south west line of Chennai Suburban Railway. It is the site of the Thirumarperu temple of Shiva. Tirumalpur is 78 km from the state capital, Chennai.
