= K. P. P. Nambiar =

Indian businessman (1929–2015)

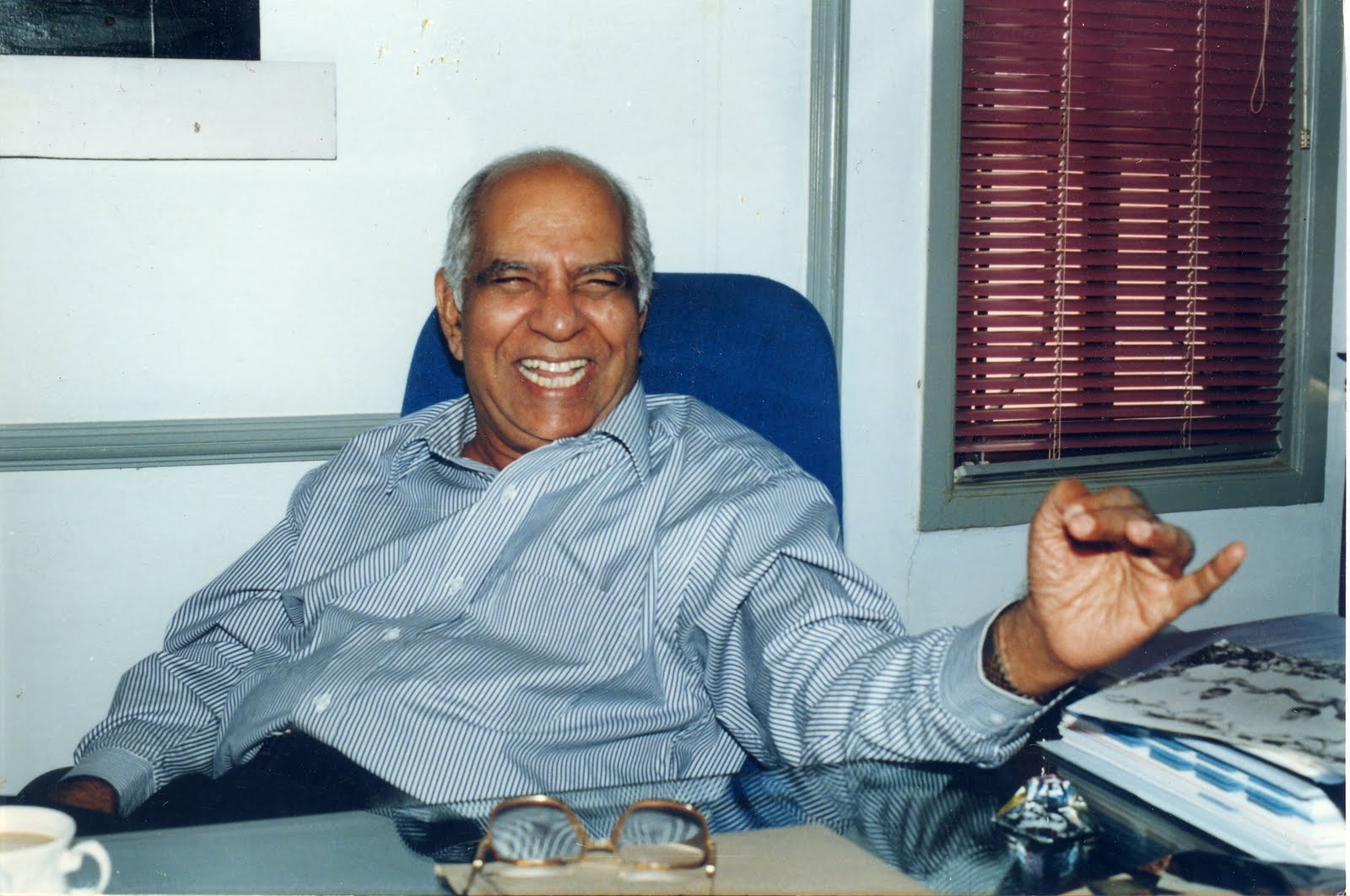
- Nambiar at his residence
- Born: 15 April 1929; Kalliasseri, Kannur, Kerala, India
- Died: 30 June 2015 (aged 86); Bangalore, India
- Occupations: Industrialist, technocrat
- Spouses: Marjorie Agnes Nambiar; Uma Devi Nambiar
- Children: 3
- Parent(s): P. P. Chindan Nambiar; K. P. Madhavi Amma
- Relatives: Pran Kurup (nephew), Rajiv Nambiar (nephew), KPK Nambiar (nephew), KP Sudhir (Nephew)
- Awards: Padma Bhushan; ELCINA Electronics Man of the Year Award; Distinguished FIETE; Vasvik Award; National Design Award; Science & Technology Award; Republic Day Award; Institution of Telecommunication Engineers Award; London County Council Major Award

Kunnath Puthiyaveettil Padmanabhan Nambiar DIC (Lond), FIEE (Lond), CEngg (Lond.), more popularly known as K.P.P. Nambiar (15 April 1929 – 30 June 2015), was an Indian industrialist and technocrat, known for his work in the field of industrial development and technology. He was awarded Padma Bhushan by Government of India for his contributions to the field of technology in 2006.

== Career ==
Nambiar went to Moothedath High School in Taliparamba. He graduated from Pachayyappa's College in Madras where he studied physics. In 1951, he joined the Imperial College of Science & Technology, University of London for higher studies in Transistors and Semi-Conductors.

Nambiar started his career as a research scholar in semiconductor technology at Imperial College from 1954 to 1957. After graduation, he worked for Texas Instruments, USA.

In 1963 he returned to India, as a part of the scientist pool scheme initiated by Prime Minister Jawaharlal Nehru to bring back talented Indians working abroad. He was a "scientist pool officer" under the Council of Scientific and Industrial Research. He taught modern semiconductor electronics in the Electrical Engineering Department of the Indian Institute of Technology, in New Delhi. Nambiar joined Philips India as Manager of Projects in 1964. In 1967, he joined Bharat Electronics Limited as Joint Head of the Piezo Electric Crystal Division in Bangalore, where he set up the first communication crystals factory in India during his brief stay there.

In 1967, while at Tata Electric Companies, he set up the first applied electronic research and development centre for industrial electronics in India. In late 1967, Nambiar was also the general manager of National Radio & Electronics Company, in Tata's consumer electronics division. He was instrumental in introducing a number of new products under such as speed control for AC and DC motors, static inverters and converters, calculators, electronic clocks, and display systems. Silicon transistor radios were introduced for the first time in the country in 1968 by NELCO during this period.

In the early 1970s, he received an invitation from the Kerala government to set up an electronics manufacturing firm. Kerala State Electronics Development Corporation Limited (Keltron) was formed with Nambiar as its first chairman and managing director. He remained in that position until 1983 when he was made the executive chairman until his retirement in 1985. In order to have a robust Research and development to support indigenous manufacturing he set up Electronics Research and Development Centre (ER & DC) at Thiruvananthapuram in 1980. Interestingly KELTRON was the blue print for Maharashtra to start MELTRON, Uttar Pradesh to start UPTRON, Bihar to start BELTRON and West Bengal to set up West Bengal Electronics Industry Development Corporation (WEBEL) which gave solid ground for television revolution in India in 1980's.

In 1985, Indira Gandhi appointed Nambiar as the chairman and managing director of Indian Telephone Industries Limited, the largest public sector company in telecommunications. In 1986, Nambiar was appointed secretary of the Department of Electronics of Government of India (now the Ministry of Information Technology) by Prime Minister Rajiv Gandhi. During this stint the Centre for Development of Advanced Computing was formed with Pune as its headquarters merging his earlier initiatives such as ER&DC, Trivandrum to it. He retired from government service in 1989. The Kerala government, in 1989, appointed him as an honorary special advisor. In this consultancy role, he drew up the blueprint for Technopark, Trivandrum. The park was inaugurated on 31 March 1991.

When acting as special advisor, Nambiar set up a private company in Bangalore, Namtech Electronic Devices Limited, for the manufacture of fail safe gas discharge tubes used as surge arresters in electronic and telecommunication equipment. Namtech is also involved in the manufacture of quartz crystals, crystal oscillators, qne light emitting diodes and displays.

In February 1995, Nambiar under the aegis of KPP Nambiar Associates and its Mauritius based subsidiary Kortech Corporation (with a 24% stake) launched an INR 1471 Crore Naphtha based power project to generate 513 megawatts of electricity under the name of Kannur Power Projects in his native Panchayat of Kalliasseri in the Kannur District in Kerala. However, the project ran into political and supply issues and had to be abandoned. The then ruling LDF government was against participation of another major global player Enron International with 74% stake in the project.

He was also instrumental in the launching of a joint venture company Bowthorpe Thermometrics, with Bowthorpe of UK and Namtech Consultants to manufacture thermistors in 1996. Bowthorpe has since transferred its ownership to General Electric in October 2001.

Nambiar suffered a stroke in 2002 and he died on 30 June 2015 at the age of 86 in Bengaluru.

== Personal life ==
Nambiar was born in Kalliasseri, North Malabar (now Kannur district, Kerala) to P. P. Chindan Nambiar and K. P. Madhavi. He had four brothers and five sisters. From his marriage to Marjorie Agnes Nambiar in London in 1953, he had a daughter and a son. While living in Bombay, he met and married Saroja Kamakshi, mother of Indian classical dancer, Malavika Sarukkai. In the 1980s, Nambiar married again, to Uma Devi of Calicut. They had one son.

== Legacy ==
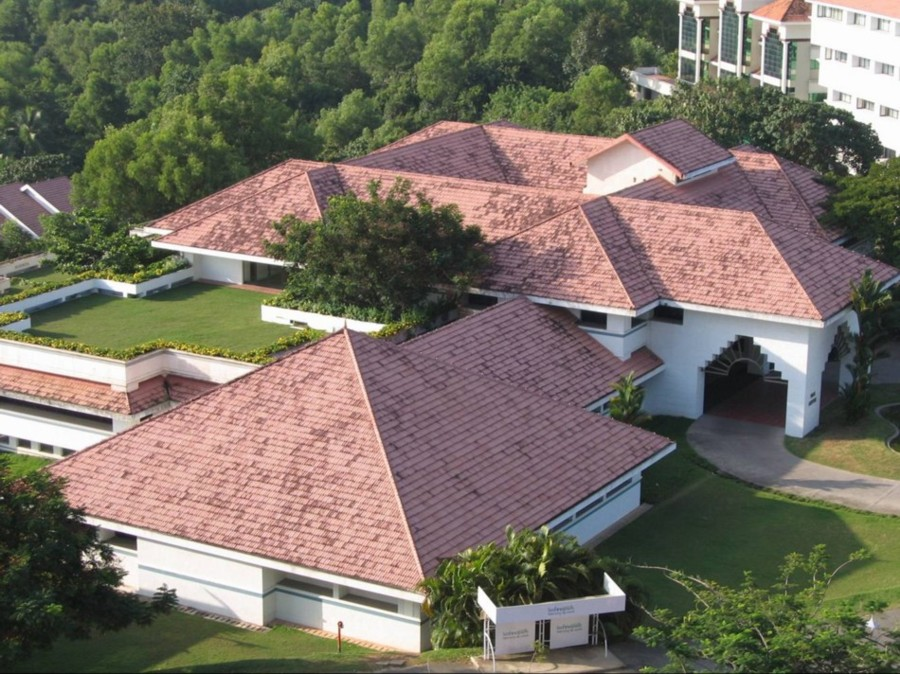
Park Centre, the administration office of Technopark

As the Secretary, Department of Electronics of the Government of India 1986–89, Nambiar was successful initiating and implementing several new policy initiatives in research and development, specifically manufacturing and application of electronics throughout the country. He played a major role in developing the Indian electronics industry including the establishment of C-DAC, STPI, CEDTI and VLSI laboratories. In the 1980s, the import of hardware or software systems was nearly impossible due to heavy taxation. Understanding that such products would help build a better India, Nambiar was instrumental in orchestrating the necessary government approvals.

During his stint as the special advisor to the Government of Kerala on industries from 1989 to 1991, Nambiar set up India's first electronic technology park in Trivandrum to provide infrastructure support required to set up high technology electronic units in the state. He also set up a chain of electronic industries in different parts of Kerala from Trivandrum to Kannur in the major areas of electronic components, industrial electronics, consumer electronics and telecommunication between 1973 and 1984.

He was responsible for expanding Palakkad unit of Indian Telephone Industries Limited from a INR 40 million unit to an INR 2 billion enterprise. Nambiar is credited with evolving a new concept of consortium of ancillary industries by mobilising all the 41 ancillary industries of Indian Telephone Industries in Bangalore to form a consortium to manufacture plan 103 telephone instruments with a turnover of more than INR 200 million.

As the founder chairman of Keltron, Nambiar was instrumental in taking electronics to the villages by setting up 50 women's co-operatives that produced most of the company's consumer products. He introduced the concept of village women's co-operatives for manufacture of electronic assembly oriented products, thereby taking industries to the villages of Kerala. Keltron's manufacturing units were also situated all over the state in rural areas, directly and indirectly employing several thousand people. The concept of women's co-operatives in villages was emulated by various state governments like Punjab, Bihar, Manipur, Pondicheery and Uttar Pradesh. Keltron also trained unskilled workers into skilled electronic equipment assembly operators, enabling them to work in women's co-operatives in Ranchi, Pondicherry, Imphal, and Lakshadeep.

He also developed the research and development center for Keltron, which was later taken over by the Department of Electronics and has since been brought under C-DAC. Keltron was the first autonomous corporation in the state sector in India, an example later emulated by several state governments in the country.

During his stint as the honorary special advisor to the Government of Kerala on industries, Nambiar influenced Ratan Tata, the chairman of Tata Industries, to invest in Kerala, resulting in the formation of Taj Hotels and Resorts and Tata Ceramics.

He received a Padma Bhushan in 2006 for all of his contributions to the fields of science and engineering in India.

== Positions held ==
- Research Scholar – Imperial College of Science & Technology, University of London
- Technical Management – Texas Instruments
- Scientist Pool Officer – Council of Scientific and Industrial Research
- Manager (Projects) – Philips India
- Joint Division Head – Piezo Electric Crystal Division, Bharat Electronics Limited
- general manager – National Radio and Electronics Co. Limited (NELCO)
- Founder – Tata Electronic Research and Development Labs
- Founder chairman and managing director – KELTRON
- Executive chairman KELTRON
- Founder Chairman of Electronic Research & Development Centre
- Secretary to Government of India – Department of Electronics
- Chairman & managing director – Indian Telephone Industries Limited
- Special Advisor to the Government of Kerala on Industries
- Chairman, Indian Institute of Management (IIM), Kozhikode
- Chairman – Indian Institute of Information Technology and Management (IIITM-K), Kerala
- Chairman – Namtech Electronic Devices Limited
- Chairman – Namtech Tai Ltd
- Promoter – Bowthorpe Thermometrics India (P) Limited
- Vice-chairman – World Malayalee Council

== Awards ==
- Padma Bhushan – 2006
- Electronics Man of the Year Award by Electronic Component Industries Association (ELCINA) – 1995
- Distinguished Fellow of the Institution of Electronics and Telecommunication Engineers – 1986
- VASVIK Industrial Research Award – 1986
- National Design Award by the Institution of Engineers – 1985
- Science & Technology Award by Kerala Government – 1978
- Republic Day Award by the Invention Promotion Board of the Council of Scientific and Industrial Research – 1973
- Institution of Telecommunication Engineers Award – 1963
- London County Council Major Award for the post graduate studies – 1955

== See also ==
- C. Achutha Menon
- Kerala State Electronics Development Corporation
