= T. Vijayaraghavacharya =

Indian civil servant (1875–1953)

Sir Thiruvalayangudi Vijayaraghavacharya KBE
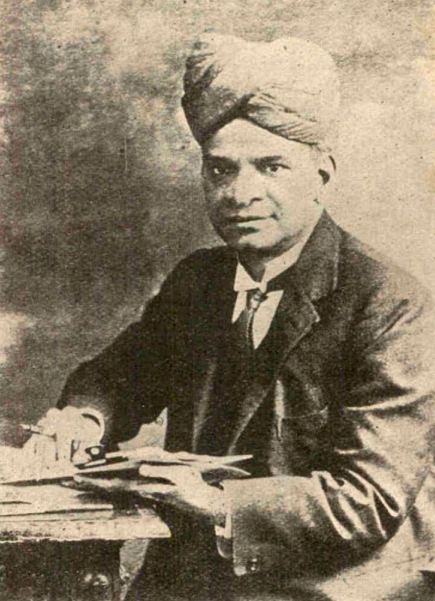

Diwan of Udaipur
- In office 1939–1947
- Monarch: Bhupal Singh

Diwan of Cochin
- In office 1919–1922
- Monarch: Rama Varma XVI
- Preceded by: J. W. Bhore
- Succeeded by: P. Narayana Menon

Personal details
- Born: 27 August 1875 Karur, Madras Presidency
- Died: 28 February 1953 (aged 77) Madras, India

Diwan Bahadur Sir Thiruvalayangudi Vijayaraghavacharya KBE (27 August 1875 – 28 February 1953) was an Indian civil servant and administrator who served as the Diwan of Cochin kingdom from 1919 to 1922. Vijayaraghavacharya was also a member of the Constituent Assembly of India representing Udaipur.

== Early life and education ==
Vijayaraghavacharya was born in Erode on 27 August 1875 and was educated at the Presidency College, Madras. Vijayaraghavacharya completed his B.A. in 1894 and obtained an M.A. in 1898.

== Career ==
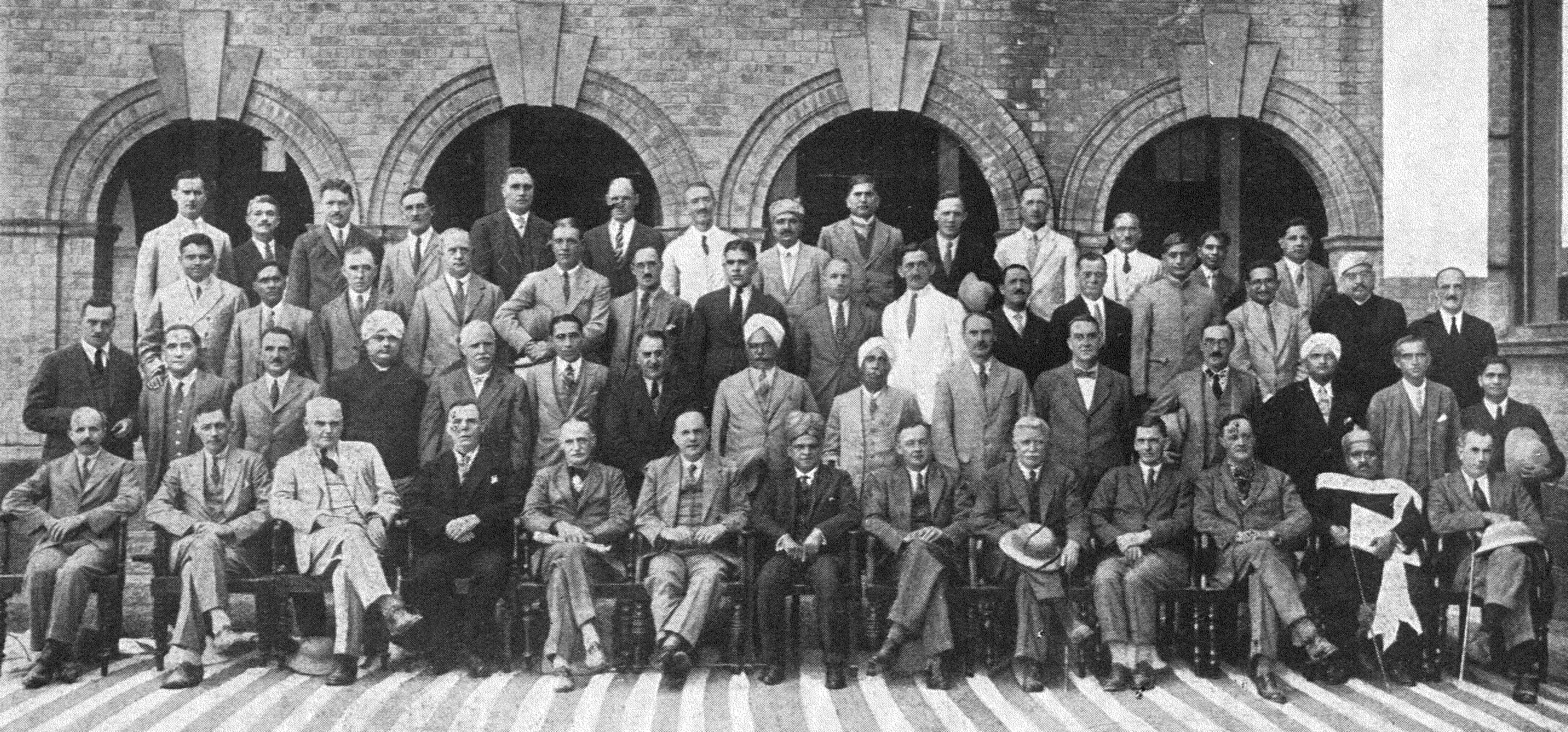
Dewan Vijayaraghavarcharyar at a meeting in Pusa in 1929. Sitting at the centre of the front row (seventh from left) with turban

=== Early career ===
Vijayaraghavacharya joined the provincial civil service in 1898 and served, initially, as a district officer. From 1912 to 1917, he served as Secretary in the Board of Revenue, Madras Corporation and as Deputy Director of Industries from 1918 to 1919. In 1919, he was appointed Diwan of the Cochin kingdom and served from 1919 to 1922.

=== Cochin kingdom ===
During his tenure, Vijayaraghavacharya started the industrialization of Cochin kingdom. The Nair Regulation was introduced in 1920. Female literacy increased considerably during this period. Local Self-governing bodies such as village panchayats and municipal councils were given increased powers and privileges.

=== Indian government ===
In 1922, he was appointed Commissioner for India at the British Empire Exhibition, Wembley and was, in 1926, made Director of Industries. He also served for a short time as member of the Public Service Commission and in 1929, was appointed Vice-Chairman of the Imperial Council for Agricultural Research.

Vijayaraghavacharya retired from the civil service on 25 December 1935. Four years later, he was appointed Diwan of Udaipur.

== Death ==
Vijayaraghavacharya died on 28 February 1953 at the age of 77.
