= T. S. Narayana Iyer =

Indian lawyer, civil servant and administrator

Rao Bahadur Tarakat Shangumani Narayana Iyer
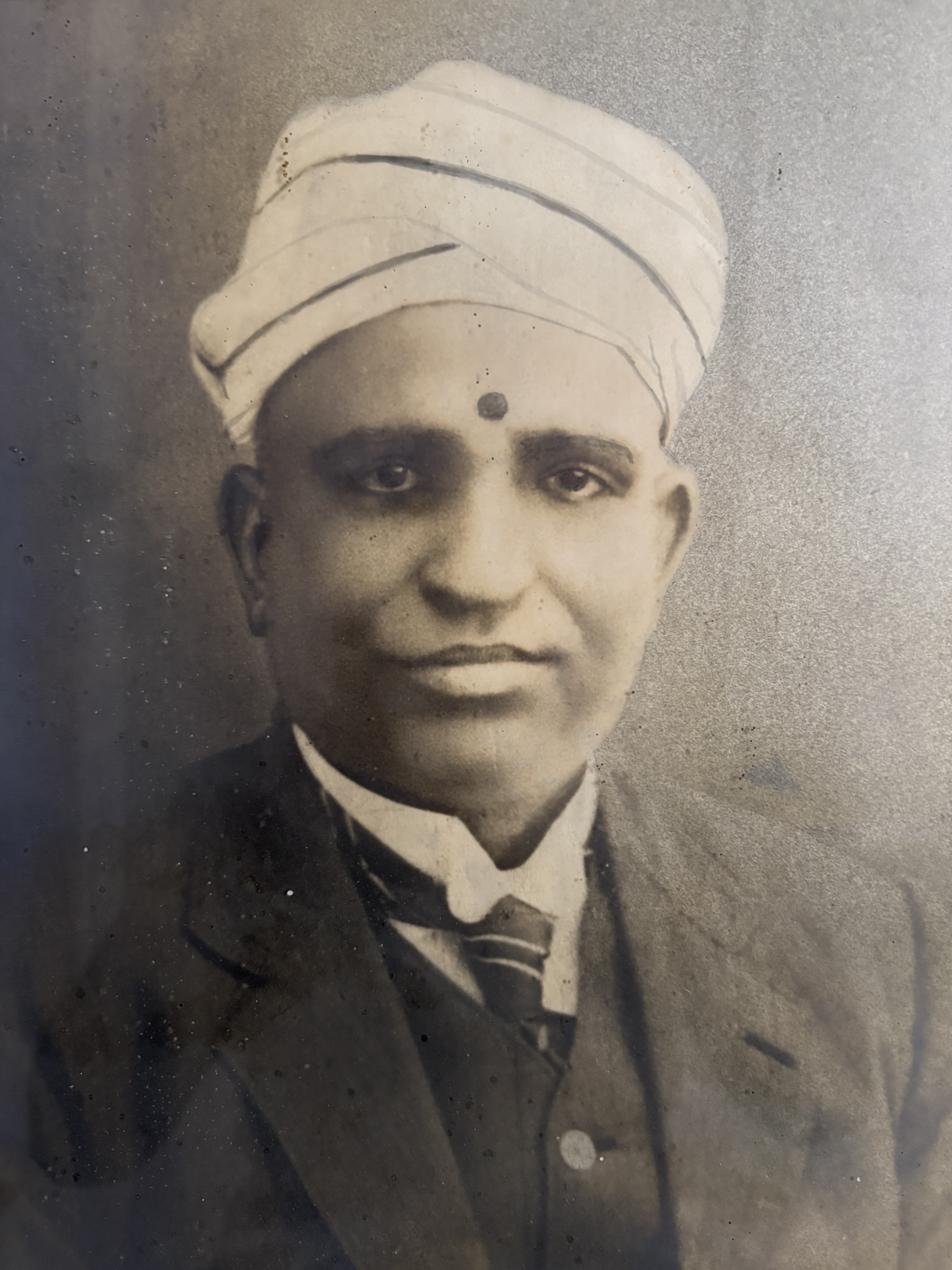

Diwan of Cochin
- In office 1925–1930
- Monarch: Rama Varma XVI
- Preceded by: P. Narayana Menon
- Succeeded by: C. G. Herbert

Personal details
- Born: October 1898 Tarakath, Palakkad

Rao Bahadur Tarakat Shangumani Narayana Iyer (born October 1898) was an Indian lawyer, civil servant and administrator who served as the Diwan of Cochin kingdom from 1925 to 1930.

== Early life and education ==
Narayana Iyer was born to T. Subramnia Iyer of Tarakat in October 1898. Subramania Iyer had served as Government Pleader in Trichur. Narayana Iyer matriculated from the CMS High School, Trichur. Narayana Iyer, later, graduated in law and practised as a lawyer.

== Career ==
Narayana served as a judge of the Cochin High Court before being appointed Chief Justice of the Cochin Court. While serving as Chief Justice of Cochin, he was appointed Diwan of the princely state.

=== Diwan ===
As Diwan, Narayana Iyer presided over the first session of the Cochin Legislative Council. He was also responsible for the construction of water pipelines to Trichur, Mattancheri, Nemmara and Ayalore.
