= Ezhuthu Kalari =

Ezhuthu Kalari is a Malayalam term that refers to old traditional village schools in Kerala. These institutions were the major centers for initiating elementary education. Most of the children in the past had to attend these centres for learning 3Rs. It had been known by other names as well, such as Ezhuthu pally, Asan Kalari or Pallikkoodam. Ezhuthu Kalari were believed to be evolved from the ancient traditions of Gurukula system of schooling. Teachers of these schools were addressed by the name Asan or Ezhuthu Asan. Ezhuthupally meaning schools on Shree Budda's period.
