= Avinissery =

Census Town in Kerala, India

- Census town
- Location in Kerala, India Avinissery (India)
- Coordinates: 10.481260°N 76.1976000°E
- Country: India
- State: Kerala
- District: Thrissur

Government
  - Body: Avinissery Grama Panchayath, Thrissur Municipal Corporation
  - Panchayat President: Sri Hari C.Narendran (BJP)

Area
  - Total: 7.82 km^{2} (3.02 sq mi)

Population (2011)
  - Total: 16,715
  - Density: 2,140/km^{2} (5,540/sq mi)

Languages
  - Official: Malayalam, English
- Time zone: UTC+5:30 (IST)
- PIN: 680306, 680313
- Telephone code: 0487
- Vehicle registration: KL-08
- Temperature Range: 22.5°C - 35 °C

Avinissery is a census town in Thrissur district, just 6 km from district headquarters, in the state of Kerala, India. Avinissery is also the name of a Gram Panchayat in Thrissur District. Avinissery is also the name of a village office in Thrissur that lies Nedupuzha police station limits in Thrissur subdivision of Thrissur City Police. Avinissery is also the name of speed post branch Post Office is situated in the Thrissur postal division.

== Demographics ==
As of 2011 India census, Avinissery census town had a population of 16,715. Males constitute 50% of the population and females 50%. Avinissery has an average literacy rate of 83%, higher than the national average of 59.5%. 12% of the population is under 6 years of age. A lot of villagers are occupied in gold work like the neighboring places Cherpu, Perinchery, Ammadam, Vallachira, and Ollur. This has led to immigration of workers from Tamil Nadu, West Bengal and North East India. The famous Malayalam poet Mullanezhi and Indian National Congress leader V. R. Krishnan Ezhuthachan are from this census town.
