= P. Kumaran Ezhuthachan =

Indian politician and lawyer

P. Kumaran Ezhuthachan was a politician and lawyer from Thrissur, Kerala. He was a leader of the Cochin State Congress a political party formed in 1936. Ezhuthachan was five time member in Cochin Legislative Council.
