= Ankam =

Malayalam word for duel

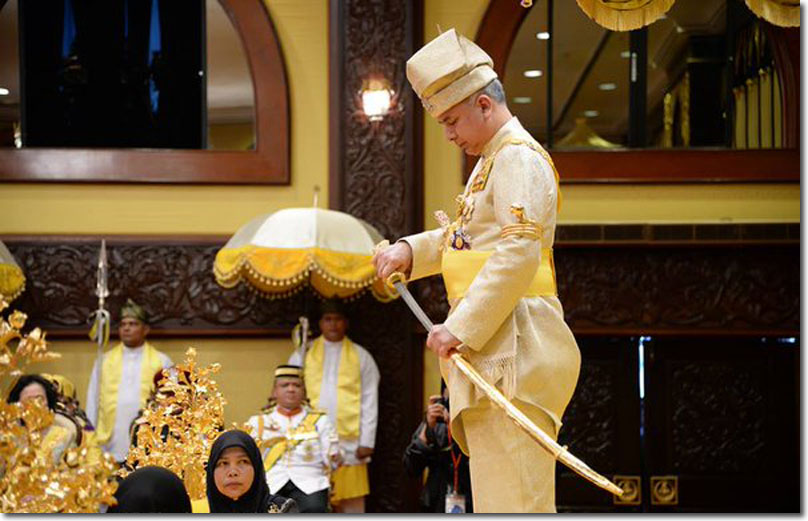
Churika mandakini, the churika sword used by Malaysian Kings at their coronation ceremony

Ankam is a Malayalam word meaning combat or battle, typically fought with swords called 'Churika' in Malabar of Kerala. The outcome of an Ankam was determined by one warrior killing the other. It can refer to either a duel or a larger-scale war.

These duels were conducted on elevated platforms known as Ankathattu, ensuring that only the designated combatants participated, thereby protecting civilians from harm.

A fundamental principle of Ankam was the clear distinction between combatants and non-combatants. The engagement was strictly limited to the warriors chosen to represent each side, preventing conflicts from escalating into broader violence.

The duels followed a strict code of conduct, emphasizing fairness and honor among warriors. Unethical practices were prohibited, and combatants were expected to demonstrate respect for their opponents. The structured nature of Ankam also included provisions for the families of warriors, who were often compensated by their rulers as recognition of their sacrifice.

From a historical perspective, Ankam represents an early form of regulated conflict resolution, aligning with principles later seen in modern international humanitarian law. By selecting designated warriors and adhering to agreed-upon combat rules, this practice helped contain disputes, preventing them from spreading to surrounding regions while maintaining social order.

In medieval Kerala, Ankam was practiced either as a fight between two warriors to prove who was better at Kalari, to settle ego clashes, to avenge the killing of an ancestor by engaging in a sword fight with the current generation of the tharavad—a practice known as settling Kudipaka (vengeance passed through generations)—or as a means of resolving disputes between districts and nobles. The duelists, known as Chekavar or Ankachekavar, were trained in Kalari to serve as militiamen under a lord, helping to prevent large-scale wars that could result in thousands of deaths.

These Anka Chekavars were either the chiefs of the army or the best martial artists, who were rewarded with enormous wealth—sometimes enough to sustain them for seven generations—by the hiring parties.

For dispute resolution, Ankam between warriors was considered the last resort, only after exhausting other methods such as presenting the case in the village assembly or conducting Ankams between cocks. If none of these methods resolved the issue, then, as the final measure to prevent large-scale war between regions, an Ankam would be held between the best Kalaripayattu warriors from each side

A fight between two Kalari warriors could occur due to an ego clash or as a way to resolve a dispute, creating a war-like situation between the two. In case of dispute resolution, When a dispute arose between two local rulers, each side would engage warriors to fight for them in organised single combat at a fixed place and time. Each local ruler was represented by one Ankachekavar. The ankam were usually fought to the death, and the ruler represented by the surviving Ankachekavar was considered the winner.
