= P. N. V. Kurup =

Indian physician and researcher (1925–2018)

- Born: 1925; Kerala, India
- Died: 27 April 2018 (aged 92–93)
- Occupation: Ayurvedic practitioner
- Awards: Padma Shri

Paneenazhikath Narayana Vasudeva Kurup (1925 – 27 April 2018) was an Indian Ayurvedic practitioner, researcher, writer and the founder director of the Central Council for Research in Homoeopathy (CCRIMH). He is a former vice chancellor of the Gujarat Ayurved University, Jamnagar and a former advisor of the Indian Systems of Medicine and Homoeopathy (ISM&H) of the Ministry of Health and Family Welfare. He has published several articles and a book, A Handbook on Indian Medicinal Plants, on the traditional Indian medicine system, The Government of India awarded him the fourth highest civilian honour of the Padma Shri, in 2005, for his contributions to Indian medicine.

== Biography ==
Born in 1925, in the south Indian state of Kerala, Kurup joined the Gujarat Ayurved University, Jamnagar and worked as the Professor and Head of Panchakarma Institute of the university. Later, he moved to the Ministry of Health and Family Welfare and headed the Department of Indian Systems of Medicine and Homoeopathy (ISM&H), the precursor of the Central Council for Research in Homoeopathy (CCRH), as its founder director in 1969. He presided over the division of the department into four autonomous entities, the Central Council for Research in Ayurveda & Siddha (CCRAS), the Central Council for Research in Homoeopathy (CCRH), the Central Council for Research in Unani Medicine (CCRUM) and the Central Council for Research in Yoga & Naturopathy (CCRYN), in 1978. He has served as the vice chancellor of the Gujarat Ayurved University and has contributed to the establishment of the Indian Institute of Ayurvedic Pharmaceutical Sciences, an institute under the university, offering education on Ayurvedic pharmaceutical studies, in 1999.

Kurup was an honorary physician to the President of India and served as the director of the Central Council for Research in Ayurveda & Siddha (CCRAS). He also served as the government nominated member Secretary of the council, as well as the Central Council for Research in Homoeopathy (CCRH). He published several articles on the topic of Ayurveda, contributed to chapters to Ayurvedic texts and wrote a book, A Handbook of Medicinal Plants, a reference text on Indian medicinal plants. He was a founder member of the Central Council of Indian Medicine when the council was established in 1971 by the Ministry of AYUSH. He was also associated with the World Health Organization (WHO) as a consultant. The Government of India honoured him with the fourth highest civilian award of the Padma Shri in 2005. He died on 27 April 2018.

== See also ==
- Institute of Indigenous Medicine
