= Pran Kurup =

Indian entrepreneur and author (1966-2016)

- Born: 3 October 1966; Chennai, Tamil Nadu, India
- Died: 3 September 2016 (aged 49); Thiruvananthapuram, Kerala, India
- Occupations: Entrepreneur, author
- Parent(s): K. Madhava Kurup, Sarojini
- Relatives: K. P. P. Nambiar (uncle)

Pran Kurup (3 October 1966 – 3 September 2016) was an Indian entrepreneur and author.

== Personal life ==
Pran Kurup was born in Chennai to K. Madhava Kurup and Sarojini, who hailed from Kannur. He was the nephew of K. P. P. Nambiar. He completed his graduation in Electrical Engineering from Indian Institute of Technology, Kharagpur and post-graduation in Robotics from Miami University.

== Entrepreneur and author ==
Pran Kurup co-founded Vitalect with Taher Abbasi and Ricky Bedi, an e-learning company based in California in 1997. The company was originally called ByteK Designs Inc. and renamed to Vitalect in 1999. He also served as the president of the Silicon Valley Indian Professionals Association (SIPA).

Kurup authored three books. The first two books were on technical topics. He co-authored Logic Synthesis Using Synopsys with Taher Abbasi. The second book It's the Methodology, Stupid! was co-authored with Taher Abbasi and Ricky Bedi. In 2016, he released his third book on his IIT batchmate and friend Arvind Kejriwal. Titled Arvind Kejriwal & the Aam Aadmi Party: An Inside Look, the book contained a political analysis of the rise of Kejriwal and AAP and a comparison of the growth with that of start-up companies. The book was released by Kejriwal himself in New Delhi.

He was also a columnist on the Economic Times blogs.

== Death ==
Pran Kurup died on 3 September 2016 in Thiruvananthapuram, due to heart failure and was cremated on 5 September 2016. He is survived by his wife, a daughter and a son.
