= Narayam =

Ancient writing instrument used in Asia

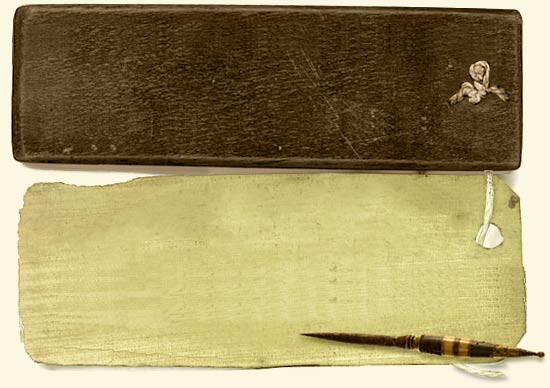
Thaliyola and narayam

Narayam or ezhuthani is a writing instrument (stylus) used since antiquity in South India, Sri Lanka and other proximate regions of Asia. It is a long piece of iron with a sharpened or pointed end and fabricated to ergonomically fit into the writer's fist. Although similar to the modern day pen in shape and use, instead of using a colored ink, it scribes on the surface (normally a pre-treated palm leaf), creating fine scratches in the form of letters and shapes.

== Description and use ==
Narayam was the primary tool to scribe on palm-leaf manuscripts called thaliyola, the pre-treated leaf of an Asian palmyra palm. Until the introduction of paper, the palm leaves remained as the primary medium for creating, circulating and preserving written articles in the region.

Narayam was made in shapes and sizes to suit the writer's style and ergonomic comfort. They ranged from very simple design to the most eloquent fashions befitting the status of its users. Sometimes, it was maintained as an accessory to other personal utility tools like pocket knives, etc., similar to the Swiss Army knife culture. In addition to scribing, the narayam could be used as a punching pin to pierce small holes on the palm leaves. Through these holes, the individual leaves were kneaded together using threads, thereby forming a bound collection which is commonly known as a grantha (book), e.g. Guru Granth Sahib.

== See also ==
- Writing implement
- Stylus
