= Aasaan =

Malayalam and Tamil surname and title that means teacher or guide

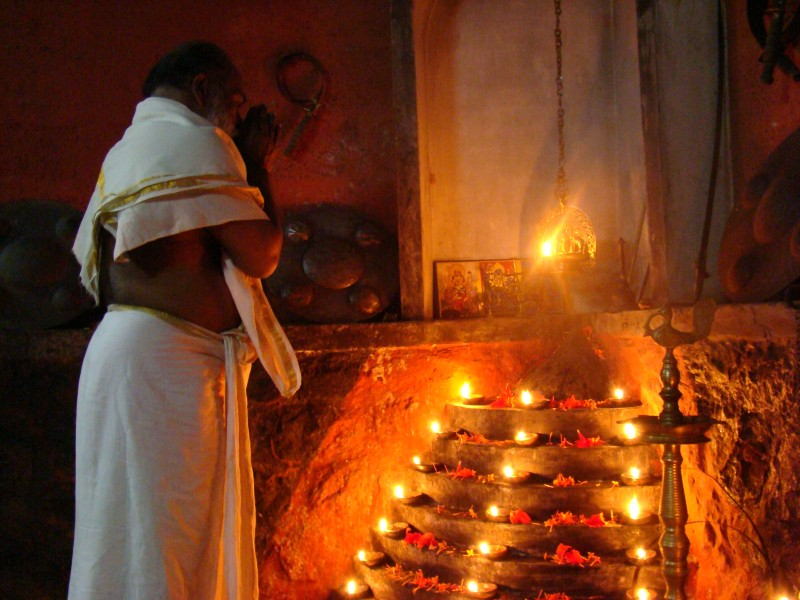
Gurukkal praying before puttara CVN Kalari, Ettumanoor

Āśān (IPA: [aːʃaːn, aːsaːn]) is a Malayalam and Tamil surname and title that means teacher or guide.

== Etymology ==
Aasaan is a simplification of the Sanskrit term "Acharya" to denote "teacher/guru".

== Traditions ==
They acted as the media for Sanskritisation and literacy to Non-Brahmins. Ezhuthuassan was another name in which they were known at certain regions of Kerala. Till the second half of twentieth century the AsanKalari or Ezhuthu Kalari or Ezhuthu palli (village schools) were common in each village as it was conducted in many families of Ganaka in Travancore.

The female members of Ganaka were generally addressed as Asatti or Asaatti, because they too had engaged in teaching 3Rs to pupil.

For the last two centuries, it has not been uncommon to adopt this title by many learned people from other castes (Nair, Ezhava, Thiyya, Christian Nadar) as well. Eventually, the common usage of the term Asan gradually lost its original meaning as a venerated symbolic representation for teachers, as it is found used in every parlance without any significance to its meaning.

== Notable persons ==
- Kumaran Asan, one of the triumvirate poets of modern Kerala
