= Thirumarperu =

Thirumalpur திருமால்பூர்
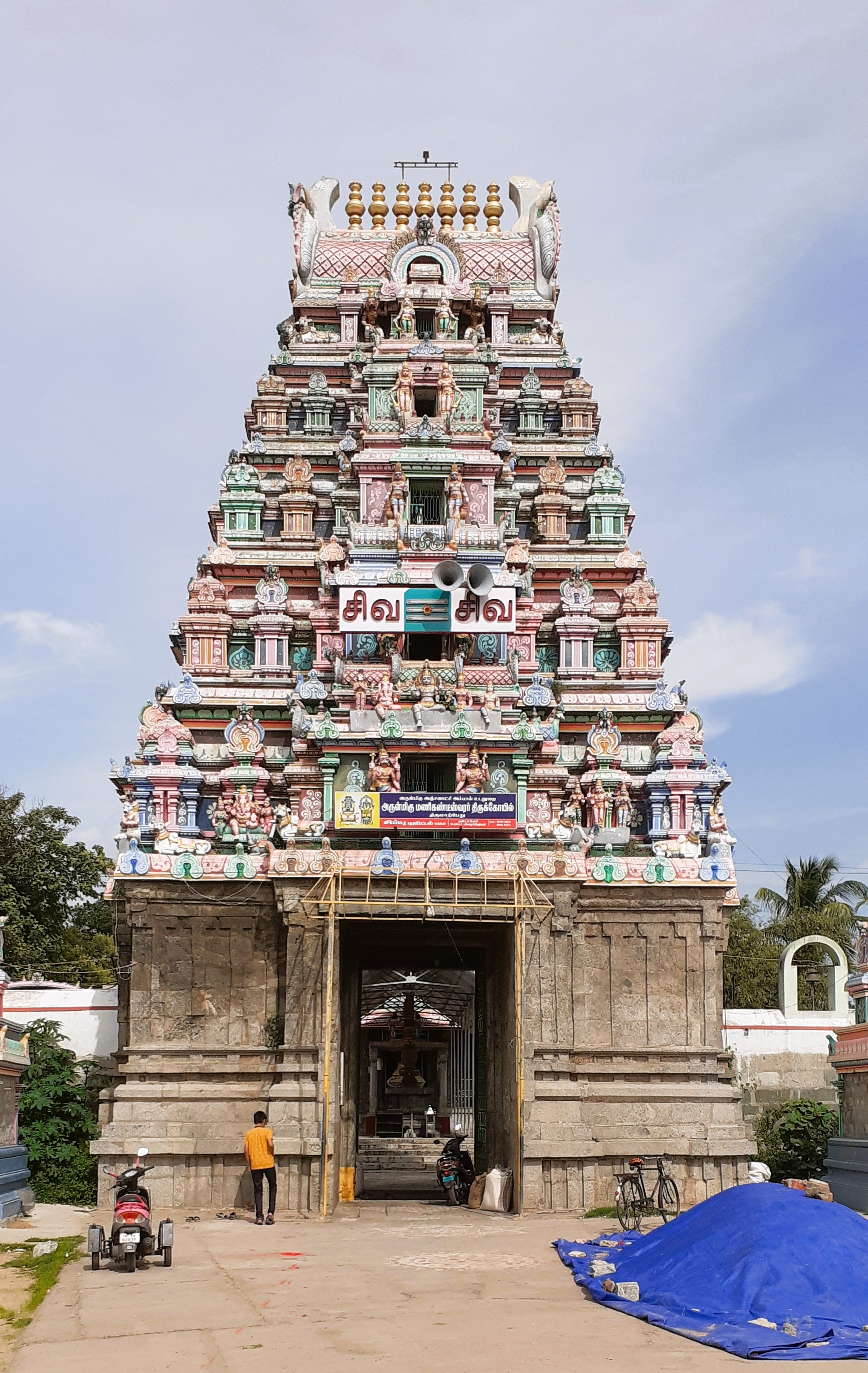

- Location in Tamil Nadu

Religion
- Affiliation: Hinduism
- District: Ranipet
- Deity: Maal Vanangia Eesar, Manikandeswarar (Shiva) Karunai Nayaki, Anjanakshi (Parvathi)

Location
- Location: Tirumalpur
- State: Tamil Nadu
- Country: India
- Coordinates: 12°57′24″N 79°40′25″E

Architecture
- Type: Dravidian architecture

Thirumarperu Manikandeswarar Temple is a Hindu temple dedicated to Shiva on Ocheri-Tirumalpur road in Tirumalpur, Tamil Nadu, India. Constructed in the Dravidian style of architecture, the temple is believed to have been built during the Cholas period in the 9th century. Shiva is worshipped as Manikandeswarar and his consort Parvathi as Karunai Nayagi.

The presiding deity is revered in the 7th century Tamil Saiva canonical work, the Tevaram, written by Tamil saint poets known as the Nayanmars and classified as Paadal Petra Sthalam. A granite wall surrounds the temple, enclosing all its shrines. The temple has a five-tiered Rajagopuram, the gateway tower.

The temple is maintained and administered by the Hindu Religious and Endowment Board of the Government of Tamil Nadu.

== Legend ==
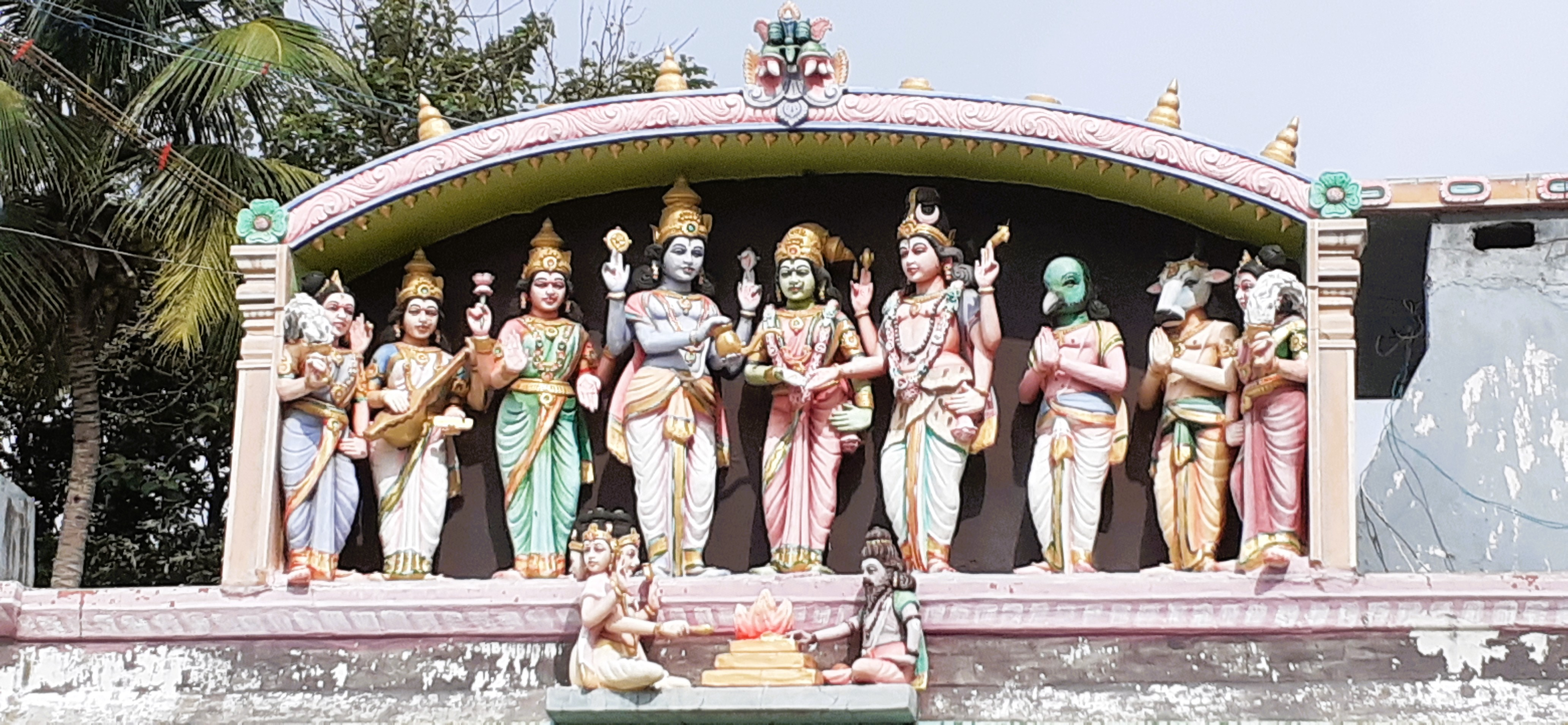
Legend of the temple

Vishnu (called Tirumal) is believed to have worshipped Shiva in this temple; hence the name Thirumalpur. Local tradition says that Tirumalpur was where Vishnu asked Mahabali Chakravarthy to give him land measured by three of Vishnu's steps. As per local legend, when Vishnu touched his discuss on sage Dadisi, the weapon lost its power. As advised by others, Vishnu worshipped Shiva to obtain the Sudharshana discuss. Vishnu started worshipping Shiva at this place daily with thousand flowers. To test his donation, Shiva took away one of the flowers. Vishnu offered his eye in place of the missing flower. Pleased by his devotion, Shiva offer his discuss to Vishnu. Shiva also offered a boon to Vishnu that his devotees in this temple will be blessed with the same grants as they achieve by visiting thousand temples.

== History ==
The place is of both historic and prehistoric importance on account of the Paleolithic tools and megalithic potteries found in the region. There are sculptures found with Brahmi script and other material remains. The place is identified in the Kasakkudi plates of Nandivarman II and Aihole inscription of Pulakeshin II that describe the war between Pulekesin and Mahendravarma Pallava. The temple obtained patronage from various ruling empires in the region specifically by the Cholas from Aditya I to Rajaraja I. An inscription by Parthivendra Pallavan from the central shrine indicates that the central shrine and the mandapa around in granite by Paramandadilltan There is a mention of Madurantakan Gandaridattan from the period of Sundara Chola to that of Rajaraja I. An inscription from 988 CE states that Rajaraja himself made a donation of golden flower to the presiding deity.

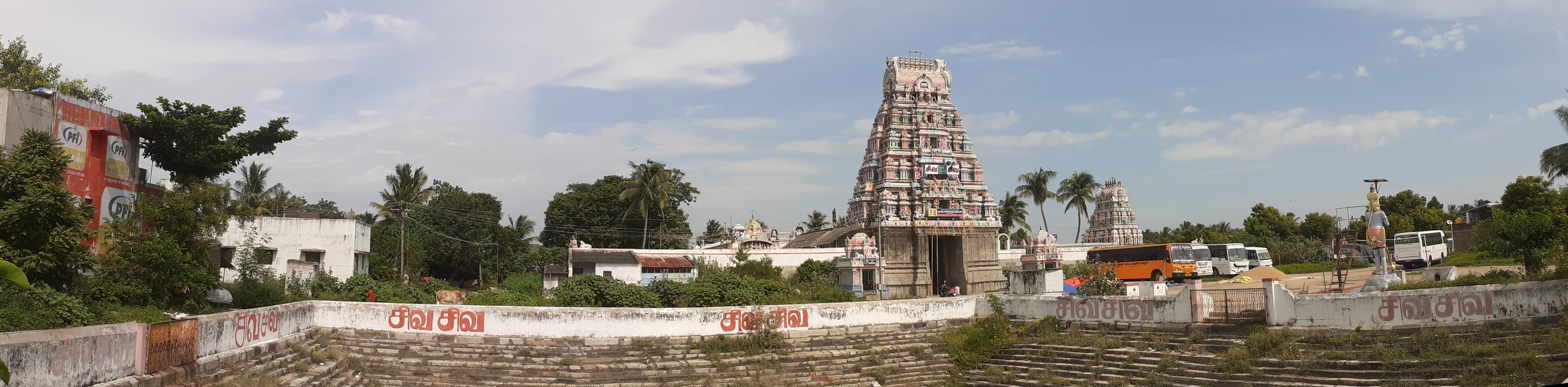
Panoramic view of the temple

== Architecture ==
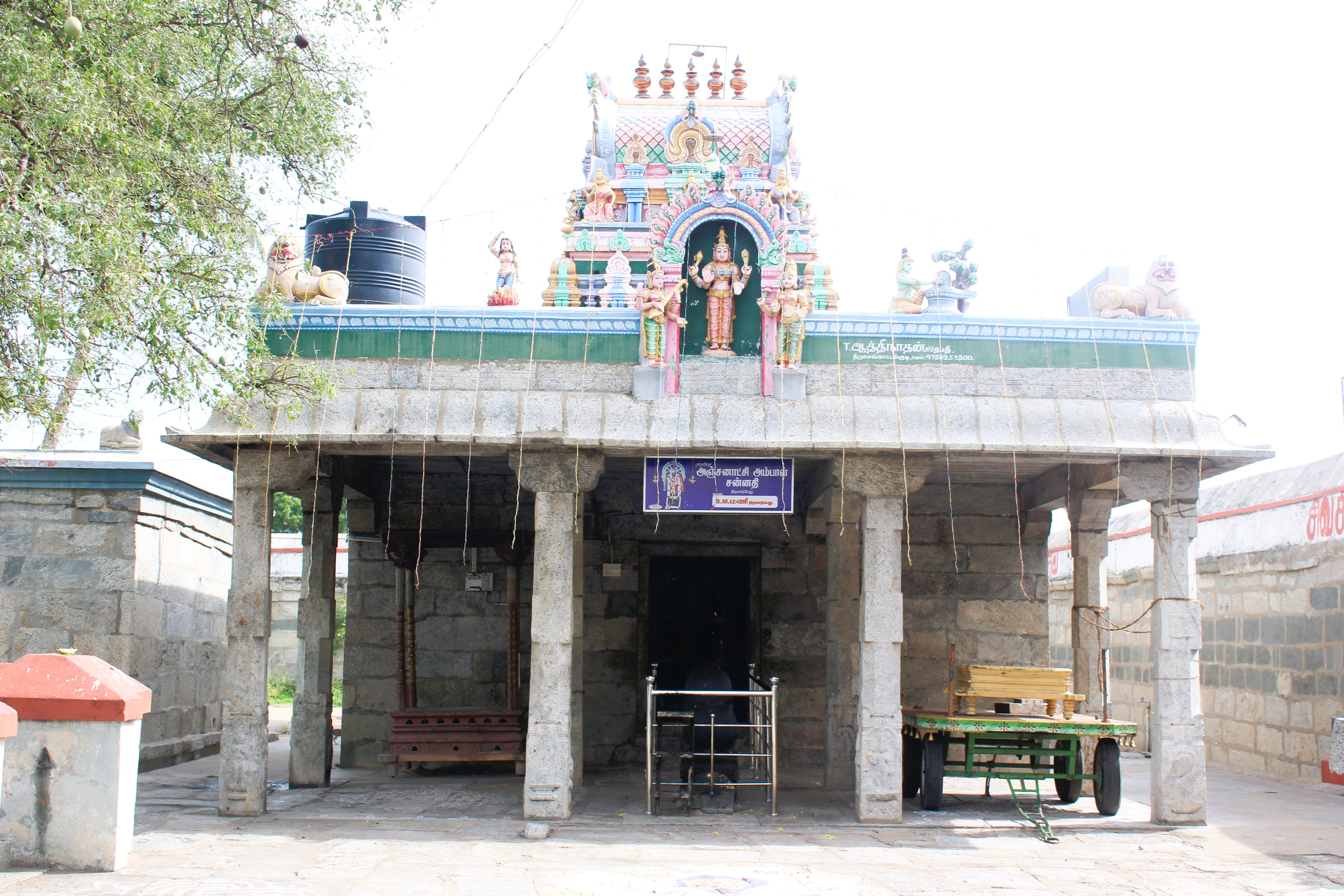
Image of the Ambal shrine

The temple is located in Thirumalpur, which is in the outskirts of kanchipuram. The temple has a four-tiered rajagopuram (tower) and a set of inscriptions from the Chola period of Rajaraja Chola I (985–1014 CE). Appar, the 7th-century saint poet, glorified the deity in Tevaram in one verse. The temple is also referred to as Hari-chakrapuram. The Nandi, the sacred bull of Shiva, is in standing position in this temple, unlike in other Shiva temples where he is sitting. The temple tree is Vilva. The image of the presiding deity is made of sand from Virundeswara river by Parvathi. The presiding deity is covered by copper pot. Unlike other Shiva temples, ablution is thus not performed on the presiding deity. Chakra Theertha, the temple tank is located outside the main gateway. There is a distinct image of Nandi in standing posture facing the central shrine. There is also an image of Vishnu facing the presiding deity. There is an image of Vallabha Vinayaga with ten arms.
