= E. K. Krishnan Ezhuthachan =

- Born: 4 January 1924; Chettupuzha, Thrissur, Kerala
- Died: 13 December 2005 (aged 81)
- Occupation(s): legal expert, writer
- Notable work: Bharanaghatanakku Oru Bhashyam
- Awards: Puthezhan Award

E. K. Krishnan Ezhuthachan (4 January 1924 – 13 December 2005) was a legal expert and writer a native of Chettupuzha, Thrissur, Kerala. Ezhuthachan had served as Magistrate, Deputy secretary at Ministry of Law and Justice (India), Lawyer in the Supreme Court of India etc. He has authored several books. His book Bharanaghatanakku Oru Bhashyam won the Puthezhan Award.

== Works ==
- Puraathanakila
- Thankamudhra
- Judge(Novel)
- Nadhikal Kadha parayunnu
- Amme oru Kadha parayu
- Pramaadamaaya kolakkesukal
- Bharanaghatanakku oru bhaashyam
- Ramayanam muthal god of small things vare: viswasaahityathile 100 kruthikalude avalokanam
- Law of dictionary: English-Malayalam with case law
- Niyama vijnaanakosam
- Bharanaghatana kuttikalkku
- Shaakya simham
- Kuroor
