= Kochi Rajya Prajamandalam =

Political party which was formed in 1941 at Thrissur

Kochi Rajya Prajamandalam is a political party which was formed in 1941 at Thrissur, Kerala, India, in connection with the Indian independence movement. E. Ikkanda Warrier, V. R. Krishnan Ezhuthachan, S. Neelakanda Iyer, and Kurur Neelakandan Namboodiripad were the key people in the formation of the party. Eminent politicians like Panampilly Govinda Menon, K. Karunakaran worked in the party.

== History ==
A group of young people who were displeased with the functioning of political movements in the erstwhile Kochi state, at the meeting held on 26 January 1941 under the leadership of V. R. Krishnan Ezhuthachan, decided to form the Kochi Rajya Prajamandalam. The party was formally inaugurated on 9 February 1941 at Manikandanalthara, Thrissur and selected S. Neelakanda Iyer as President and Ezhuthachan as general secretary. The primary objective of party was to end political sovereignty of the King of Cochin and gain equality and political power for the people. The party also worked to spread the use of khadi, prohibit liquor, and gain progress in the field of education.

Prajamandalam's work to save people from calamity during the flood of 1941 gained acceptance for the party. The party formed a flood relief committee during that time.

Prajamandalam formed an organisation called Cochin karshaka sabha which worked primarily to end the difficulties farmers faced due to feudalism. Cochin karshaka sabha stood for permanent ownership for farmers in their field. Their protests caused acceptance of the verumpatta kudiyan bill on 13 February 1943 at the Cochin Legislative Council.

Prajamandalam decided to conduct its first annual meeting in 1942 at Irinjalakkuda, but the diwan of Cochin, A. F. W. Dixon, banned it. However, some leaders came forward to conduct the meeting. Many leaders including Karunakaran were arrested and faced brutal torture in jail.

In connection with the Quit India movement on 5 August 1942, a conference was conducted under the leadership of Gandhiji and Nehru for All India Congress Committee at Bombay. Iyer and Ezhuthachan attended the conference by representing Prajamandalam. As part of the Quit India movement, Prajamandalam actively participated in strikes. During that time there was strong ban in functioning of the press, Prajamandalam started a newspaper called Deenabandhu. The newspaper helped to strengthen freedom movements.

In 1945 Prajamandalam faced election and gained a majority in the Cochin Legislative Council. Prajamandalam chose opposition and worked for responsible government. The party also worked for the Temple Entry movement also.

Prajamandalam is one of the first political parties which dispersed after completion of its objective. Later Prajamandalam merged with Indian National Congress.
