= K. Balakrishna Kurup =

K.Balakrishna Kurup
- Born: 20 January 1927; Chevayur, Calicut
- Died: 23 February 2000 (aged 73)
- Education: Master's degree in English literature, Economics, Social science
- Occupations: Writer, historian, teacher
- Spouse: T.Y.Devaki Amma
- Writing career
- Language: Malayalam

Kuniyedath Balakrishna Kurup (20 January 1927 – 23 February 2000) was a Malayalam writer he also worked in politics, journalism, and teaching. He wrote books in fields such as history, psychology, and astrology. In 1998 he received the 'K. R. Namboothiri endowment award' for his work about tantra (Aarshabhoomiyile bhogasidhdhi Thanthravidhya oru padanam)). He was an editorial board member of Deshabhimani newspaper.

== Biography ==
K. Balakrishna Kurup was born to Arikkodi Parambath Narayanan adiyodi and Kuniyedath Cheriyammamma on 20 January 1927 at Kuniyedath, Chevayur amsham desham Calicut in Kerala. He was an active communist in his school days. After ending his active political work in the 1960s, he obtained master degree in English literature, economics, and social science. He learned astrology due to curiosity that developed towards it when he was in Bangal. His areas of interest were history, astrology, psychology, occultism, and philosophy.

He married T.Y. Devaki and had four children. He died due to a massive heart attack at his home in Kozhikode on 23 February 2000, aged 73.

== Works ==
- Aarshabhoomiyile bhogasidhdhi(Thanthravidhya oru padanam)
- Kavyashilpathinte manasastram
- Prasangavedhi
- Sthreekalude manashastram
- Viswasathinte kanappurangal
- Kozhikkodinte charithram(Mithukalum, Yadharthyangalum)
- Valsyayana kamasutram(Aadhunika vyakhyanam)
