= Cochin Legislative Council =

The Cochin Legislative Council was a unicameral legislative body of the Cochin State that functioned from 1925 to 1948 before the merger of Cochin and Travancore to form the Travancore–Cochin state and the Travancore–Cochin Legislative Assembly.

== Formation ==
The council was inaugurated in April 1925 under the Cochin Legislative Council Act of 1923 which established a 45-member legislature in Cochin comprising 30 elected and 15 nominated members. Franchise however was limited, dependent on several property and allied qualifications and besides general constituencies there were also special constituencies created to represent specific classes such as those of landlords and planters.

The council was allowed to introduce bills, elicit information from the government, move resolutions and discuss and vote on the budgetary demands. T. S. Narayana Aiyer was the council’s first president. In 1926, two select committees were formed and in 1935, four Standing Advisory Committees were constituted. The Council functioned out of the Legislative Council building which is now a part of the main block of the Government Law College, Ernakulam. In 1932, the Council was expanded taking the number of members to 54.

In 1938, under the Government of Cochin Act, 1938, a system of diarchy was introduced in Cochin and the office of a minister, chosen from the members of the council and answerable to it, in charge of departments related to rural development was created. The model was based on the system of diarchy that had been established in British India through the Government of India Act 1919. Among the subjects that were transferred to the minister were agriculture, co-operatives, public health, panchayats and industries. Cochin was among the earliest princely states to create such an office. The Council’s membership was also raised to 58 of whom 38 were elected members.

In the elections of 1938, the Cochin Congress and the Cochin State Congress were the principal rivals. Ultimately, the Cochin Congress secured 13, the Cochin State Congress 12 and the independents and Progressive Party 13 seats. The Cochin Congress with the support of some independents came to power on 17 June 1938. This election also saw V.J Mathai become the first Indian to defeat a European for a seat in any legislative body across British India.

== Ministries ==
Ambat Sivarama Menon became the first Minister for Rural Development and on his death was succeeded by Dr. A. R. Menon who in turn was forced to resign on 25 February 1942 in the wake of a no-confidence motion. T K Nair alias Thozhur Krishnana Nair succeeded Dr Menon and held office until July 1945 because the term of the Council was extended due to World War II. In the elections of 1945, the Cochin Rajya Prajamandalam, a party formed in 1941 emerged as the largest bloc in the Council but it did not lay claim to the ministership. The Maharaja then appointed Parambi Lonappan as the Minister but he was forced to resign in the wake of a no-confidence motion.

In 1946, the number of ministers was raised to four with all portfolios except Law and order and finance transferred to them. The four member ministry that assumed office on 9 September 1946 consisted of Panampilli Govinda Menon, C. R. Iyyunni, Sahodaran K. Ayyappan and T. K. Nair. It was also the first instance of a coalition government in Kerala with Nair representing the Progressive party and Ayyappan the Socialist Party. A Public Accounts Committee of the Council was also set up in 1946.

On 14 August 1947, the Maharaja of Cochin granted powers of a fully responsible government to the Legislative Council. A Council of Ministers with Panampilly Govinda Menon as prime minister then assumed office and remained in power between 1 September 1947 and 22 October 1947. This was also the first ministry to enjoy control over the Home portfolio. However, when the Home Minister, T.K. Nair used the police to put down labour struggles and popular agitations, Menon, Iyyunni and Ayyappan resigned from the Cabinet. Govinda Menon was succeeded as prime minister by T. K. Nair and his government held office till 20 September 1948. Universal adult franchise was introduced in 1948 and the Legislative Council was renamed the Cochin Legislative Assembly. The general elections of 1948 led to the Prajamandalam gaining a majority of the seats and the election of a ministry headed by Ikkanda Warrier. This was the first election held in India on the basis of universal adult franchise to a legislature. Govinda Menon, Ayyappan and C.A. Ouseph were the colleagues of Warrier in this ministry which remained in office from 20 September 1948 till the integration of Travancore and Cochin on 1 July 1949.

== Major legislative measures ==
The Cochin Legislative Council took up several important legislations and reforms during its existence. The Cochin Tenency Act, 1938 and Cochin Agriculturists Relief Act were landmarks in the history of land reforms. The Cochin Census Regulation, the Cutchi Memons Regulation, the Cochin Prevention of Food Adulteration Regulation and the Cochin Trade Union Regulation were among the other regulatory legislations undertaken by the Council.

== Travancore-Cochin Legislative Assembly ==
On 1 July 1949, the State of Travancore and Cochin were merged to form the state of Travancore-Cochin. The first Legislative Assembly (1949–51) of Travancore-Cochin had 178 members who were members of the legislative assemblies of Travancore and Cochin immediately before their integration. This included 58 members of the Cochin Assembly. The Travancore-Cochin state had a nine-member ministry was that included the four ministers of Cochin and was headed by T. K. Narayana Pillai.

== See also ==
- Travancore Legislative Council
