= Adhyatma Ramayanam Kilippattu =

Malayalam version of the Sanskrit epic Ramayana

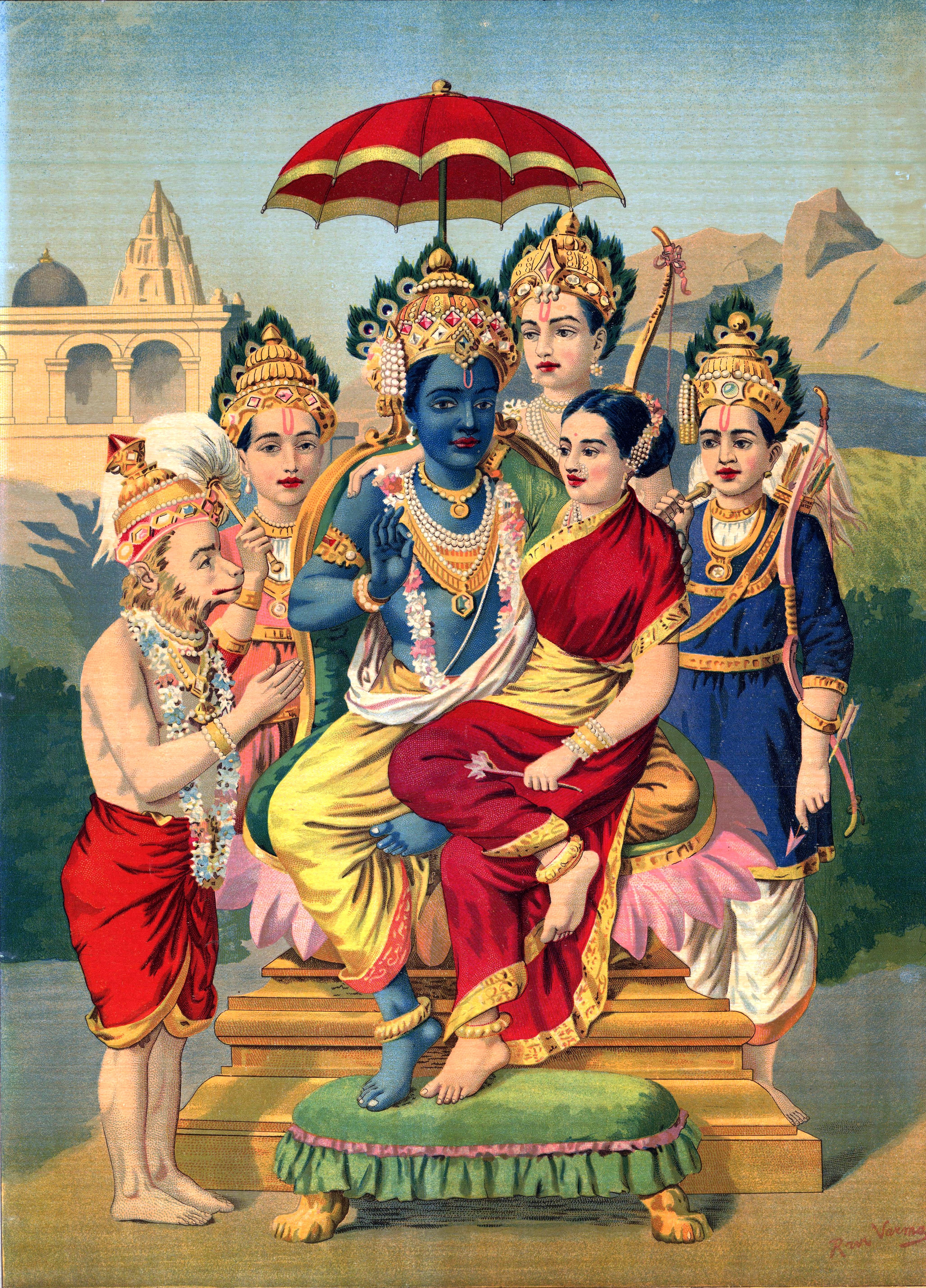
Rama and Sita, with Hanuman, and Rama's three brothers Lakshmana, Bharata, and Shatrughna.

Adhyatma Ramayanam Kilippattu is the most popular Malayalam version of the Sanskrit Hindu epic Ramayana. It is believed to have been written by Thunchaththu Ramanujan Ezhuthachan in the early 17th century, and is considered to be a classic of Malayalam literature and an important text in the history of Malayalam language. It is a retelling of the Sanskrit work Adhyatma Ramayana in Kilippattu (bird song) format. Ezhuthachan used the Grantha-based Malayalam script to write his Ramayana, although the Vatteluttu writing system was the traditional writing system of Kerala then. Recitation of Adhyatma Ramayanam Kilippattu is very important in Hindu families in Kerala. The month of Karkitakam in the Malayalam calendar is celebrated as the Ramayana recitation month and Ramayana is recited in Hindu houses and temples across Kerala.

== Date and authorship ==
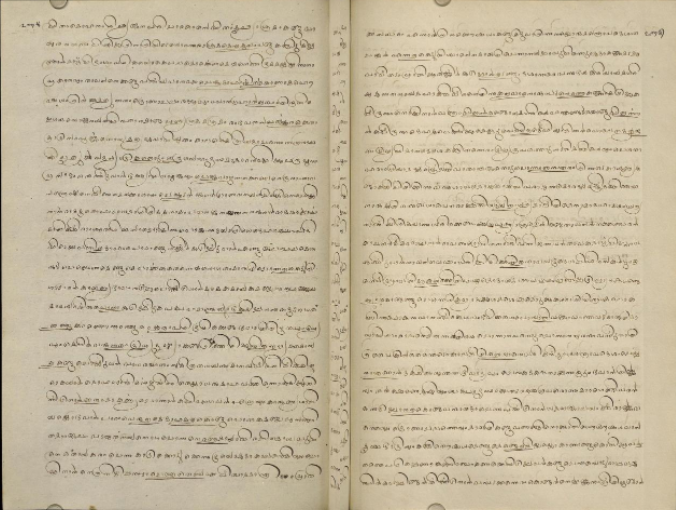
A page from a copy of the Adhyatma Ramayanam Kilippattu written in the 1870s.

Tradition ascribes the authorship of the Sanskrit Adhyatma Ramayana to Ramananda since it is said to be an integral part of the Brahmanda Purana. However, some scholars attribute it to the period 14th - 15th century CE and the author as unknown. The Adhyatma Ramayana is the portrayal of a conversation between the god Shiva and his wife Parvati, as reported by the god Brahma to the sage Narada. It is this work that provided Tulasidas with the inspiration to compose his immortal work, the Ramacharitamanasa. This is the same work which was translated by Thunchathu Ezhuthachan into Malayalam in the form of Kilippattu, a South Indian genre in which a parrot recites the text to the poet.

== Deviation from Valmiki Ramayana ==
1. In Adhyatma Ramayana everyone praises and chants the hymn on Rama starting from Vamadeva, Valmiki, Bharadwaja, Narada, Viradha, Sarabanga River, Sutikshna, Agasthya, Viswamitra, Vasishta, Jatayu, Kabhanda, Shabari, Swayamprabha, Parasurama, Vibhishana, and Hanuman. This is absent in Valmiki's.

== See also ==
- Kaikulangara Rama Variar
