= Thunchath Ezhuthachan Malayalam University =

University in Kerala

- Motto: Shreshtam Malayalam
- Established: 2012; 14 years ago
- Chancellor: Governor of Kerala
- Vice-Chancellor: Dr. C. R. Prasad (acting)
- Pro-Chancellor: Roji M. John; Minister for Higher Education
- Location: Tirur, Kerala, India; 10.883°N 75.895°E
- Website: malayalamuniversity.edu.in

Thunchath Ezhuthachan Malayalam University, also called Malayalam University, is a state university in Tirur, Kerala, India.

== History ==
Thunchath Ezhuthachan, after whom the university is named.

It was established by the Government of Kerala and inaugurated by Chief Minister Oommen Chandy on 1 November 2012 in a function held in the premises of Thunchanparamba, the home of Thunchath Ezhuthachan in Tirur, Malappuram, Kerala. K. Jayakumar, a civil servant of the Indian Administrative Service cadre, who retired as the Chief Secretary of Kerala on 31 October 2012, prepared the Project Report of the university. He is the first Vice-Chancellor of Malayalam University.

The university is named after Thunchaththu Ramanujan Ezhuthachan, a 16th-century CE Malayalam litterateure whose writings helped develop Malayalam as a language with a script of 51 letters, vocabulary, and literature. Thunchath Ezhuthachan was born at Trikkantiyur in Thunchan Parambu in Tirur, in the state of Kerala.

At the time of its inauguration Malayalam University had no infrastructure in the form land and buildings. According to the newly appointed vice-chancellor the university offices will start functioning in temporary structures erected in the premises of Thunchan Memorial Govt College, Tirur.

== Objectives ==
According to its website, the objectives of the university are as follows:

- To implement programmes concerning the mother tongue and to encourage studies among Malayalies.
- Imparting education at the post graduate level on Malayalam literature, science, humanities, social science and technology through Malayalam Medium, Malayalam language and linguistics, comparative literature, Malayalam criticism, antique, ancient record, evolution of South Indian language scripts, history of scripts, tribal language study, regional language study, the study in the categories of Poem, Short Story, Novel, Study of Kerala Renaissance History, Science, Science and Technology and Social Sciences, Epigraphy, Archaeology and Museology, and Translation into and from Malayalam;
- Imparting education on the Kerala's culture particularly in the areas of folklore and Written and unwritten cultural heritage, performing arts, traditional architecture, folk tales, classical and contemporary music, theatre, art of engraving, study of folklore and martial arts.
- To offer courses of study on Kerala's heritage, traditional knowledge systems, cultural anthropology and media studies with modern technical knowledge;
- To undertake research programmes on Kerala's culture, heritage, language and literature, for making Malayalam script more adaptable to computer technology and to equip Malayalam to express advanced knowledge in science and technology;
- To publish in Malayalam the literary composition regarding the culture, heritage and language of Kerala.
- Taking up projects for collection, documentation, preservation and inventorisation of cultural expressions of Kerala including valuable manuscripts using modern technology

== Academic programmes ==
=== Postgraduate courses ===
- MA Journalism & Mass Communication
- MA Linguistics
- MA Malayalam Literature Studies
- MA Creative Writing
- MA Cultural Heritage Studies
- MA / MSc Environment Studies
- MA Development Studies and Local Development
- MA History
- MA Sociology
- MA Film Studies

=== Diploma courses ===
- New Media Studies
- Writing for Television and TV Presentation
- Advertising and Copywriting
- Heritage Tourism
- Script Writing and Videography
- Project Preparation and Evaluation

=== Research programmes ===
M.Phil. & Ph.D. programmes are offered in

- Linguistics
- Malayalam Literature
- Cultural Heritage
- Media Studies
- Development Studies
- Sociology
- Environment Studies
- History
- Comparative Literature

=== Other projects ===
- On-line Malayalam Dictionary
- Heritage Survey
- Linguistic Survey Museum Project

A study centre — Ezhuthachan Padana Kendram — is preparing an Ezhuthachan Lexicon and bringing out books on Ezhuthachan with a view to encouraging research on the great poet.

== Administrative structure ==
The General Council is the supreme authority of the university. This body consists of 26 ex officio members, 10 nominated members, and 10 elected members. The chief executive body is the executive committee consisting of six ex officio members, three elected members and three nominated members. The chancellor of the university is the governor of Kerala and the pro-chancellor is the minister of higher education of Kerala.

== Powers and functions ==
The university website specifies its powers and functions:

- to provide instruction in Malayalam language, literature, translation, comparative literature, folk, classical, ritualistic arts of Kerala and tribal culture, Kerala's traditional knowledge systems, folk tales, folklore studies, martial art studies, cultural studies, and media studies;
- to take up research in the areas of Malayalam language and linguistics, Malayalam literature, Malayalam diction comparative literature, other forms of cultural expressions particular to Kerala, contemporary cultural issues;
- to project and popularize the correct pronunciation of words and purity of Malayalam language;
- to protect the dialectal difference of Malayalam language which was used and being used in various regions of Kerala and to make the subject related to the same as part of the curriculum;
- to undertake research for making Malayalam script compatible with computer technology and to enrich Malayalam for expressing new ideas in science and technology;
- to institute degrees, diplomas, post graduate degrees and research degrees and other academic distinctions; to give provide opportunity to conduct graduate and post graduate degree courses in modern subjects on science and technology, social science, humanities and vocational subjects in Malayalam medium and to provide opportunity to submit research thesis including Ph.D. in any subjects written in Malayalam and to confer degrees by evaluating them;
- to institute courses of study and hold examinations and award degrees, diplomas and other academic distinctions;
- to confer honorary degrees, and other distinctions;
- to co-operate with other universities and other institutions within the state, within the country or any other country for the furtherance of the objects of the university.
- to establish schools of study in areas such as Malayalam language studies, Malayalam literature, comparative literature, translation, performing arts, inscription arts and vasthu vidya, cultural studies, media studies with modern technical knowledge, Malayalam film studies, traditional knowledge systems, philosophy etc.;
- to publish books, which can promote the language, culture and history of language in Kerala;
- to arrange study and research activities necessary for making available resourceful books in Malayalam at graduate and postgraduate levels;
- to establish a university library;
- to establish a cultural museum;
- to create posts for teaching and research and other academic activities;
- to create administrative posts;
- to institute and award fellowships, scholarships and prizes;
- to institute Chairs in the name of past personalities who had made contributions to Malayalam languages, literature and art;
- to set up endowments for conducting specialized lectures, studies and projects;
- to appoint Emeritus Professors and to invite writers and artists within the country and outside India as writer/artist/scholar in residence;

== Chairs ==
The university has instituted a Herman Gundert Chair at the Tübingen University, Germany.

== See also ==
- Viswa Malayala Mahotsavam 2012

Similar Universities in India:

- Tamil University
- Kannada University
- Suravaram Pratap Reddy Telugu University
- Punjabi University
- Gujarat Vidyapeeth
