= Kalanemi (Ramayana) =

Rakshasa in Hinduism

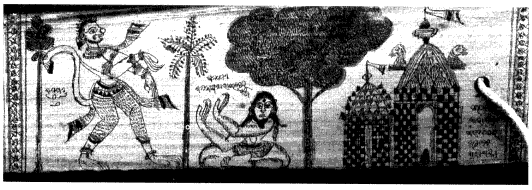
1891 painting by Sarathi Madala Patnaik in Adhyatma Ramayana depicting Hanuman and Kalanemi.

Kalanemi (Sanskrit: कालनेमि, romanized: Kālanemi) is a rakshasa mentioned in various adaptations of the Hindu epic Ramayana. He is the son of Maricha, who was tasked by Ravana, the epic's main antagonist to kill Hanuman. Although not part of Valmiki Ramayana, his encounter with Hanuman has been described in several versions, but at last he was defeated by Hanuman.

== Legend ==
In various adaptations of the Hindu epic Ramayana, Kalanemi is Maricha's son, and one of his ministers. He helped Ravana in his war against Rama. When Lakshmana, Rama's younger brother was unconscious in the war and Hanuman was asked to fetch sanjeevani, the magical medicinal herb to revive Lakshmana back; Ravana tasked Kalanemi to stop Hanuman. Ravana had promised him half his kingdom if he killed Hanuman. Hanuman flies to Himalaya to fetch the herb from the Dronagiri mountain (also said to be the Gandhamadana mountain.) Kalanemi disguised himself as a sage and erected a magical hermitage near a lake to lure Hanuman. He invited him to be his guest to take rest and refresh with a bath in the lake and also lured him by saying that he would initiate him to be able to distinguish the right herb. But Hanuman refused to take any refreshment but was only interested to take bath in the lake. Kalanemi then introduced a crocodile in the lake to kill Hanuman. Hanuman killed the crocodile which then turned into an apsara, who was earlier cursed to be a crocodile by the sage Daksha to be redeemed by Hanuman. She informed Hanuman of Kalanemi's evil plan to delay his reach to Lakshmana, who would eventually die if the herb did not reach before the sunrise. Hanuman then returned to Kalanemi and tied him and set back on his task. In another version it is said that Hanuman accosted Kalanemi en route when he was on his way to Lanka to claim half the kingdom which had been promised by Ravana. Kalanemi had assumed that the crocodile had killed Hanuman. Hanuman told Kalanemi that he was aware of his true form. He then grabbed Kalanemi's feet, swung him around, and threw him across to Lanka where he fell before Ravana and his ministers.

== Adaptations and commentary ==
Kalanemi's story is not narrated in the original Ramayana but has been covered in its adaptation, the Adhyatma Ramayana. In Adhyatma Ramayana, Kalanemi was also appraised by Narada of the divine status of Rama; the former in turn informed Ravana and requested him to befriend Rama. It is also narrated in various versions in western India and Bengali adaptations. Majority of medieval narrations include this story like the Telugu-language Ranganatha Ramayana and Tulsidas's Ramcharitmanas. Various versions change in setup of how Kalanemi stalled Hanuman. One version suggests that Kalanemi started narrating Rama's stories which Hanuman could not resist. But he could not drag it much for being unaware of facts and that exposed him. When Hanuman combats Kalanemi, Kalanemi kept changing his forms to confuse and create complication. A horned and fanged male figure sometimes shown below Hanuman's foot in idols and images is believed to be Kalanemi or Ahiravana.

== Bibliography ==
- Garrett, John (1871). A classical dictionary of India illustrative of the mythology, philosophy, literature [&c.] of the Hindus. [With].
- Kam, Garrett (2000). Ramayana in the Arts of Asia. 시사영어사. ISBN 978-0-07-115785-8.
- Lutgendorf, Philip (2007). Hanuman's Tale: The Messages of a Divine Monkey. Oxford University Press. ISBN 9780199885824.
