= Kadangot Makkam =

Regional Hindu goddess

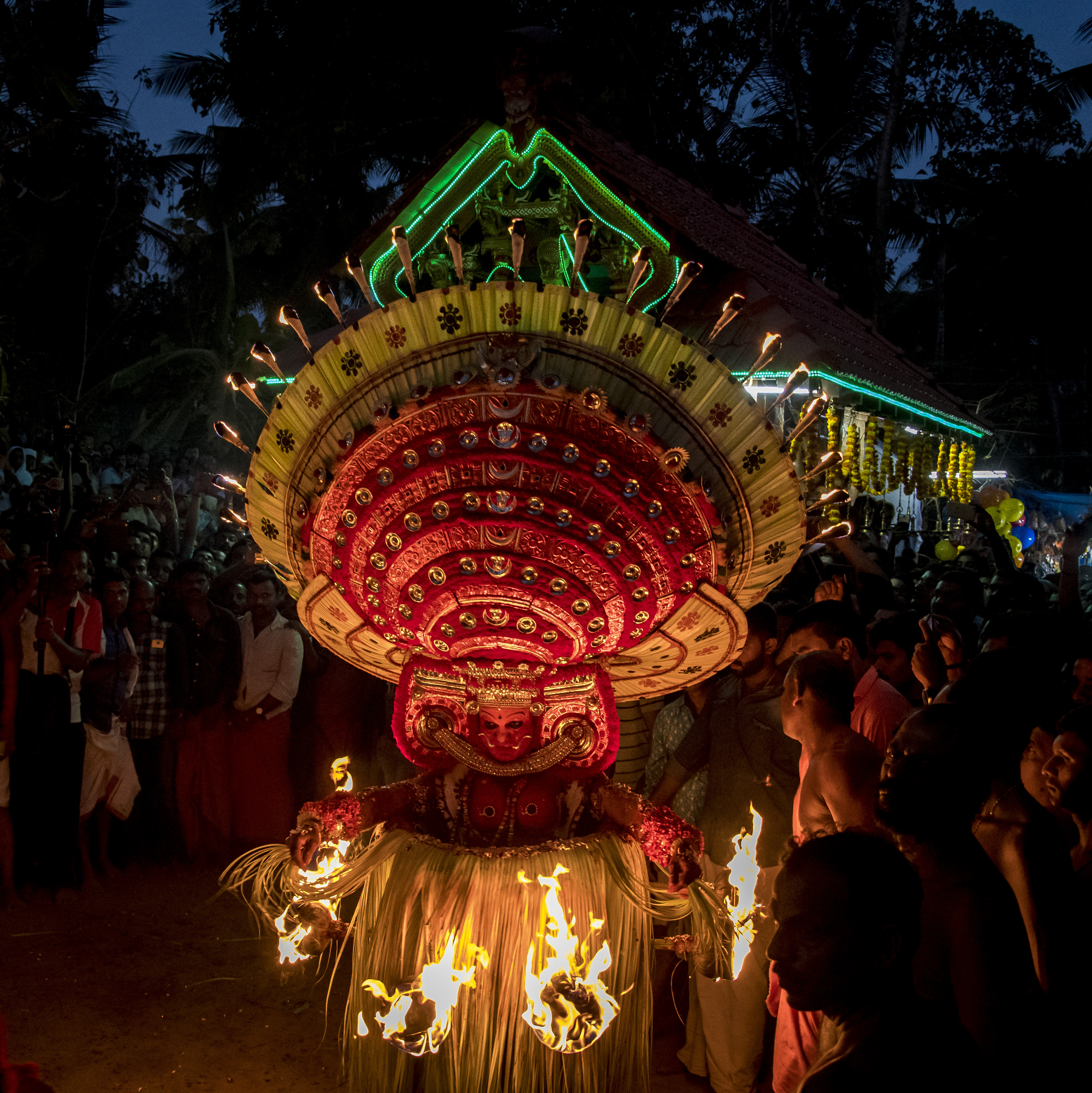
- Kadangot Makkam theyyam at kannur
- Affiliation: Hinduism
- Region: North Malabar, Kerala, India

Kadangot Makkam is a regional Hindu goddess worshiped in the North Malabar region in Kerala, India. Makkam is worshipped and performed as Theyyam form, known as Makkappothi or Makkavum makkalum (literally meaning Makkam and her children).

According to the myths, Makkam and her two children were killed by her eleven brothers, and they attained divine status after their death.

== Overview ==
Kadangot Makam, a regional Hindu goddess worshiped in the North Malabar region in Kerala, India is believed to be a heroic woman who attained divine status after death.

== Myth ==
It is believed that Makkamm was the only daughter of Unicheriya of Kadangot Nambiar family of Kunhimangalam near Payyannur in Kannur district. She was the only sister among the 12 warrior brothers of Kolathiri king. Makkam is said to be a daughter who was born with great splendor when her parents prayed a lot for a girl child, after the birth of 12 sons.

She grew up to be the beloved sister of 12 brothers. Makkam had twins named Chathu and Chiru, from her marriage to her uncle's (mother's brother) son, Kuttinambar. As it was the time of war between Neriyot kingdom and Kolathiri, her brothers joined the war. She and her sons lived with the wives of brothers. The wives of brothers, who did not like her, decided to trick her.

They made scandalous stories about Makkam and a Vaniyan who used to bring oil to the house. It was at the time when Makkam's brothers were returning from the war that Vaniyan brought oil, As makkam was having her periods those days she couldn't take the oil pot as she will pollute it as it was used for worship, she looked around for her sisters-in-law to receive the oil from vaniyan but she could not find them as they intentionally hid inside the house ignoring her call for help as part of their preplan. As she was not allowed to take the oil pot, Makkam asked him to put the oil inside the house since the wives of brothers hid and ignored her call for help. By the time Vaniyan came out of the house after placing the oil pot inside the house, the sister in laws came out suddenly and alleged makkam to have extra marital affair with vaniyan and told the same to their husbands after they reached home. Believing their wife's slander, the brothers decide to kill Makkam. But the younger brother and his wife left the house rejecting the decision to kill.

When called to go to a festival in Kottayam, Makkam realizes their evil intentions, but Makkam sets off with his brothers, praying her family deity Veera Chamundi and lighting a lamp to prove her innocence. They walked praying in the temples of each area they went to. By the time they reached the river at Chala, Makkam and her children were exhausted and thirsty. At this time, a young man who passed by showed them Puthiya pura tharavad in Chala. Makam went to the tharavad for water for the children. Hearing the movement, the old woman came out and Makkam told her that the children were thirsty. The mother of the family came with a full cup of boiled milk and gave it to Makkam and her children.

Although the old woman said that it was still a long way to Kottayam and that the children could not walk, they could be accommodated at the home, but Makam put one of her rings in the milk container and set off with her children.

When they saw a well near Kayalode Achankarappalli, Makkam and his children went there to quench their thirst. Her brothers reached there and slaughtered Makkam and the two children and threw them into the well. A Mavilan man who witnessed the incident was also stabbed to death. Only Kuti Rama, the youngest brother, did not join in this cruelty of his elder brothers.

Later was the revenge of the Makkam as she transformed in to a fierce deity and the ancestral home of Kunhimangalam was burnt to ashes. Only the room with Veera Chamundi's presence remained unburnt. Except for Kuti Rama and his wife, the brothers and their wives also died. The locals were convinced of Makkam's innocence.

Makkam, who became a god, asked the old woman of Tharavad at Chala, in a dream, to build a shrine for her and her children in their Tharavad. Soon the people decided to worship Makkam, her children and Mavilan who died with her.

== Theyyam ==
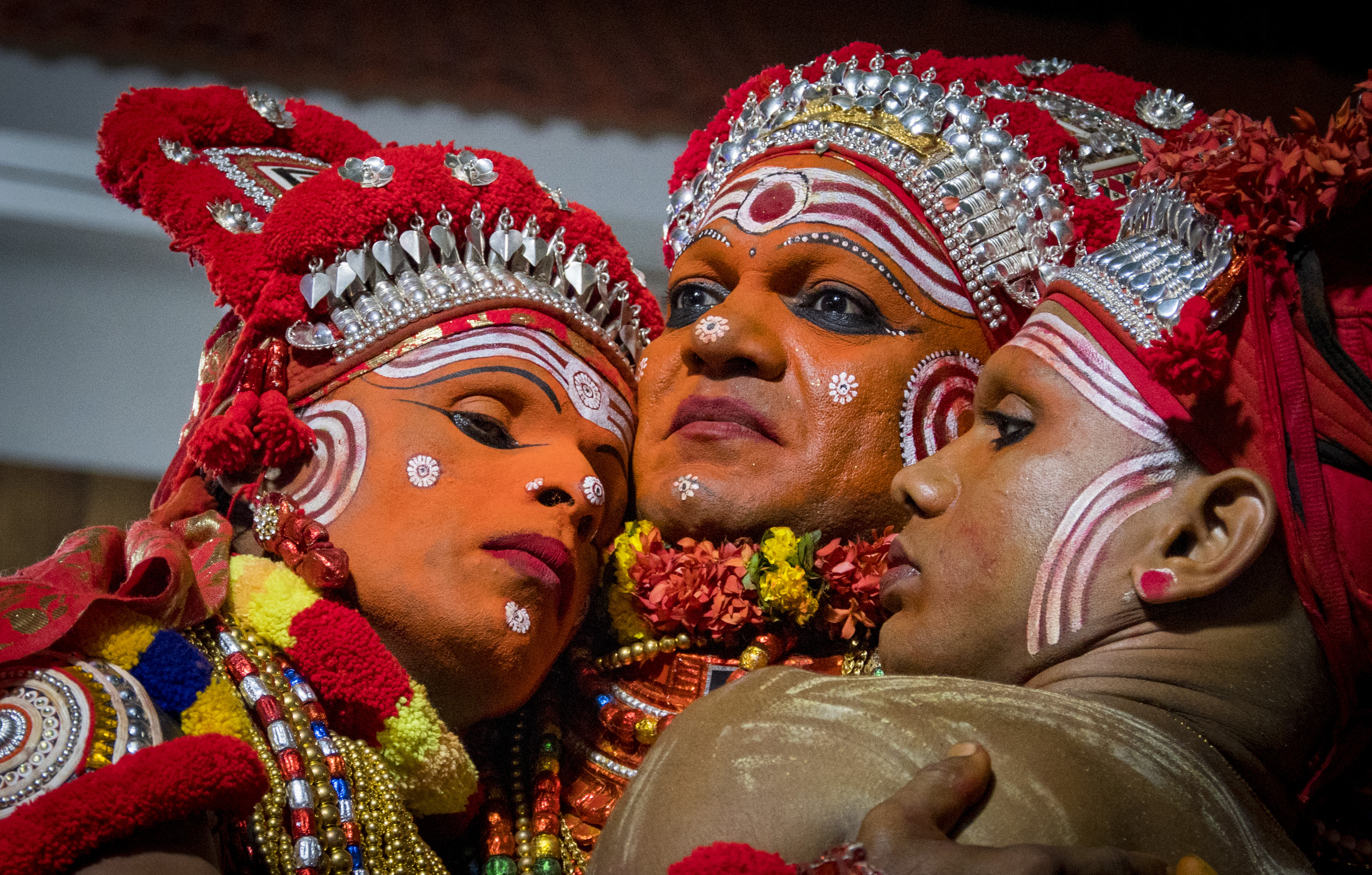
Makkam and her two children as theyyam

Makkam, her children and Mavilan who died with her are worshipped as theyyam form. Makkam theyyam is also known as Makkappothi. Makkam Theyyam is performed as part of the annual festival of the shrines of Makkam. Apart from that, of other prayers, for example, when families wish for children, they sponsor theyyam performance.

== Other works ==
first page of Kadangot Makkam (kilippattu) 1918

K. M. Kunjilakshmi Kuteilamba, Kuttamath Kanyoor Kunhikrishna Kurup and K. M. K. Nair wrote the story of Makkam in kilippattu style and published it as Kadangot Makkam (kilippattu) in 1918.

== See also ==
- Uchitta Bhagavathy
