= Viswa Malayala Mahotsavam 2012 =

Logo of the Festival

Viswa Malayala Mahotsavam 2012 (വിശ്വമലയാള മഹോത്സവം 2012) (Great World Malayalam Festival 2012) is an event organised jointly by Kerala Sahitya Akademi and the Department of Cultural Affairs, Government of Kerala, at Thiruvananthapuram during 30, 31 October, 1 November 2012. The event was inaugurated by Pranab Mukherjee, President of India, on 30 October 2012 in a function held in the Senate Hall of Kerala University.

There were literary seminars and poetry sessions as part of the three-day festival. There were also dialogues with writers from Kerala and outside and also honouring of the great men of Malayalam literature. A book fair and cultural performances were other attractions of the Festival. A notable special guest of the event was the Booker winning Nigerian novelist Ben Okri.

The event was carefully orchestrated by the organisers to boost Kerala's case for granting the classical language status to Malayalam language.

== Second World Malayalam Conference ==
The Viswa Malayalam Mahotsavam 2012 has been described as the Second World Malayalam Conference (ലോകമലയാള സമ്മേളനം). The first World Malayalam Conference was organised by Kerala University in Thiruvananthapuram in the year 1976.

== Controversies ==
There were a few controversies regarding certain aspects of the organisation of the festival:

- Displaying a bust of scientist C V Raman instead of a bust of the legendary Malayalam writer C V Raman Pillai.
- Last-minute change in the chairpersonship of a seminar on environment and subsequent cancellation of the seminar.

== Website ==
Viswa Malayala Mahotsavam : Viswamalayalam

== See also ==
- Thunchath Ezhuthachan Malayalam University
