= Kilippattu =

Music genre

Kilippattu or parrot song is a genre of Malayalam poems in which the narrator is a parrot, a bee, a swan, and so on. Kiḷippaṭṭu was popularized by the 16th-century poet Ezhuthachan (The Father Of The Malayalam language).

In Adhyathmaramayanam (work of Ezhuthachan), each chapter begins by calling the parrot and asking it to tell the story of Rama.

Harmakalkku anbulla thathe, varikedo,
Thamasa seelam agathenam aasu nee,
Ramadevan charithamrutham inniyum,
AAmodhamul kkondu chollu sarasamai.

Translation:

Oh Parrot which is dear to Lakshmi, come here,
Understand that it is not good to delay things,
Please tell with interest and great joy,
The story of Sri Rama further.

== Famous kiḷippaṭṭu ==
- Adhyathmaramayanam - Ezhuthachan
- Mahabharatham kilippattu - Ezhuthachan
- Sivapuranam kilippattu - Kunchan Nambiar
- Devimahathmyam Kilippattu
- Kadangot Makkam (kilippattu) - myth of Kadangot Makkam
