= Brahmanda Purana =

Hindu religious text

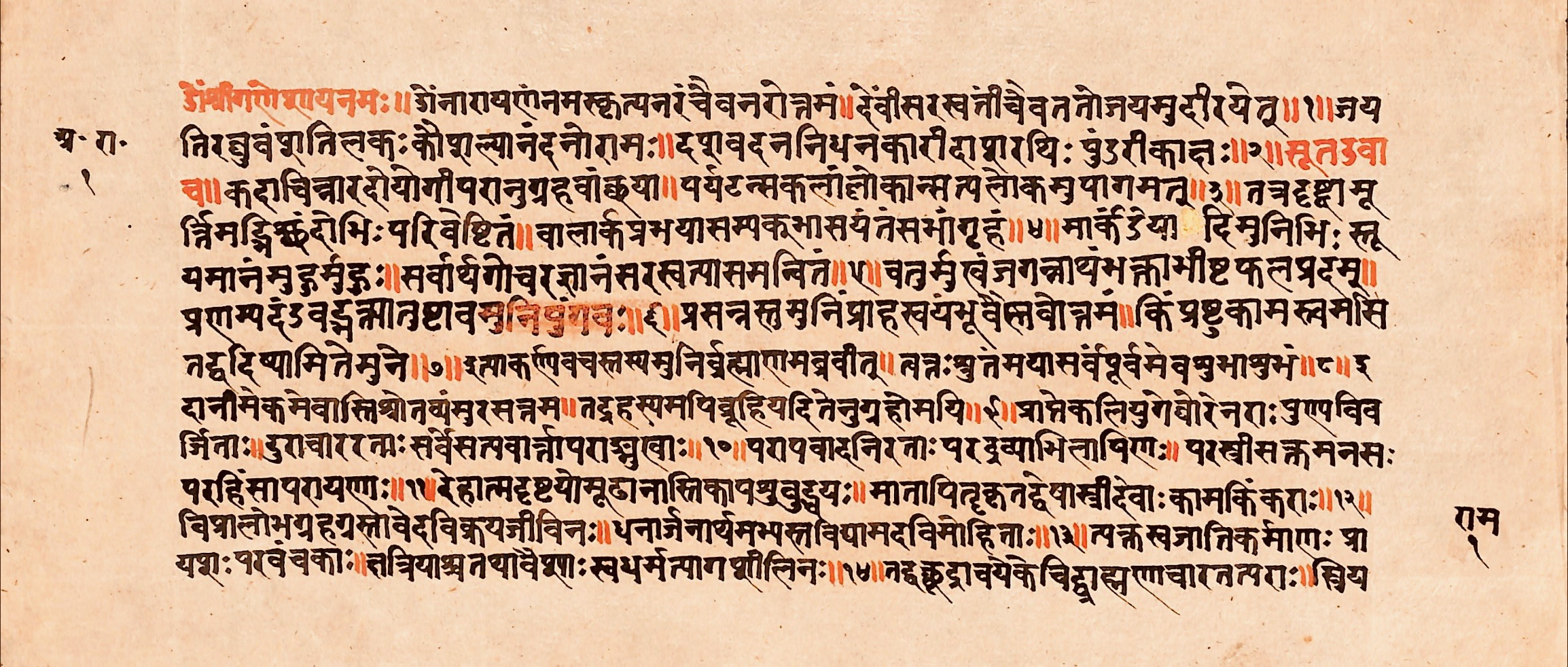
Adhyatma Ramayana Verses 1.1 – 1.14 In A Brahmanda Purana Manuscript (Sanskrit, Devanagari)

The Brahmanda Purana (Sanskrit: ब्रह्माण्डपुराण:, romanized: brahmāṇḍa-purāṇa) is a Sanskrit text and one of the eighteen major Puranas, a genre of Hindu texts. It is listed as the eighteenth Maha-Purana in almost all the anthologies. The text is also referred in medieval Indian literature as the Vayaviya Purana or Vayaviya Brahmanda, and it may have been same as the Vayu Purana before these texts developed into two overlapping compositions.

The text is named after one of the cosmological theories of Hinduism, namely the "Cosmic Egg" (Brahma-Anda). It is among the oldest Puranas, the earliest core of text maybe from 4th century CE, continuously edited thereafter over time and it exist in numerous versions. The Brahmanda Purana manuscripts are encyclopedic in their coverage, covering topics such as Cosmogony, Sanskara (Rite Of Passage), Genealogy, chapters on ethics and duties (Dharma), Yoga, geography, rivers, good government, administration, diplomacy, trade, festivals, a travel guide to places such as Kashmir, Cuttack, Kanchipuram, and other topics.

The Brahmanda Purana is notable for including the Lalita Sahasranamam and Shri Radha stotram (a stotra praising the Goddess Lalita and Radha as the supreme being in the universe), and being one of the early Hindu texts found in Bali, Indonesia, also called the Javanese-Brahmanda. The text is also notable for the Adhyatma Ramayana, the most important embedded set of chapters in the text, which philosophically attempts to reconcile Rama-Bhakti with Advaita Vedanta over 65 chapters and 4,500 verses. (Note: Quote: "Among The Texts Considered To Be Connected With The Brahmanda, The Adhyatma-Ramayana Is Undoubtedly The Most Important One".)

== History ==
The Brahmanda Purana is one of the oldest Puranas, but estimates for the composition of its earliest core vary widely. The early 20th-century Indian scholar V. R. Ramachandra Dikshitar dated this Purana to 4th-century BCE. Most later scholarship places this text to be from centuries later, in the 4th- to 6th-century CE. The text is generally assumed, states Ludo Rocher, to have achieved its current structure about 1000 CE.

The text underwent continuous revisions after the 10th century, and new sections probably replaced older ones. The 13th-century Yadava dynasty scholar Hemadri quoted large parts of the then existing Brahmanda Purana, but these parts are not found in currently surviving versions of the same text, suggesting that the 13th-century version of this Purana was different in many respects than extant manuscripts.

The Adhyatma-Ramayana, the most important embedded set of chapters in the extant versions of the Purana, is considered to have been composed centuries later, possibly in the 15th century, and is attributed to Ramananda – the Advaita scholar and the founder of the Ramanandi Sampradaya, the largest monastic group in Hinduism and in Asia in modern times. The Adhyatma-Ramayana thus was added to this Purana later, and it is an important document to the Rama-related tradition within Hinduism.

A Javanese Brahmanda palm-leaf manuscript was discovered in Indonesia in the mid-19th century by colonial-era Dutch scholars, along with other Puranas. The Sanskrit originals of these are either lost or yet to be discovered. The Javanese Brahmanda was translated by the Dutch Sanskrit scholar Jan Gonda and compared to Sanskrit texts found in India.

== Structure ==
The original, complete version of the Brahmanda Purana has been lost, and 19th-century scholars could only generally locate and procure independent sub-parts or collection of chapters that claimed to have been part of this Purana. Many of these chapters turned out to be fraudulent, sold by imposters in the 19th century. Later, Wilson states, rare compilations claiming to be the entire Purana emerged.

The published manuscript of the Brahmanda Purana has three Bhaga (Parts). The first part is subdivided into two Pada (Sub-Parts), while the other two have just one Pada each. The first Bhaga has 38 Adhyaya (Chapters), the second is structured into 74 chapters, while the third and last Bhaga has 44 chapters. These published text has a cumulative total of 156 chapters.

Other unpublished versions of the manuscripts exist, states Rocher, preserved in various libraries. These vary in their structure. The Nasiketopakhyana text, which is embedded inside this Purana, for example, exists in 18 chapters in one version and 19 chapters in another, in a form that Moriz Winternitz termed as a corrupted "Insipid, Amplified Version" of the "Beautiful Old Legend" of Nachiketa found in the ancient Katha Upanishad.

The tradition and other Puranas assert that the Brahmanda Purana had 12,000 verses, but the published Venkateshwar Press version of manuscript contains 14,286 verses. The Indonesian version of Brahmanda Purana is much shorter, lacks superfluous adjectives but contains all essential information, and does not contain the prophecy-related chapters found in the published extant Indian version. This suggests that older versions of the Indian text may have been smaller, in a different style, and without prophecy-related sections, although tradition informs the opposite (an even larger source).

== Content ==
Violence Or Non-Violence?

Ahimsa (Non-Violence),
Is The Gateway To Dharma.

Avoid Retaliating,
It Is The Way To Moksha.

[When Faced With War Or Violence]
If By Killing One,
Many Can Lead A Happy Life,
There Is No Sin, Major Or Minor,
In Killing Him.

—Brahmanda Purana
Chapters 1.2.30-1.2.36 (Note: Note: The Verse Numbering Is Different In This Manuscript Version; See Verses In Chapter 2.2)

The text is encyclopedic. It is non-sectarian and reveres all gods and goddesses, including Brahma, Vishnu, Shiva, Ganesha, Surya and Shakti. The text's philosophy is a blend of the Vedanta, Samkhya and Yoga schools of Hindu Philosophy, woven in with Bhakti and some tantra themes.

The second part, which comprises chapters 5–44 of the third section, the Uttarabhaga is the Lalitopakhyana (Narrative Of Lalita). It describes the Goddess Lalita (a manifestation of Adi Parashakti) and her worship as well a discussion of Tantra. This part is written as a dialogue between Hayagriva and sage Agastya on Lalita's emergence out of fire, after which the king of gods Indra worshipped Devi (the goddess representing the Supreme Reality). It includes her war with the Asura Bhanda and her final triumph.

The sections of this Purana include:

- Detailed description of creation of cosmos, discussion about the time as a dimension and details of Kalpa and Yuga.
- Description of certain dynasties like the houses of Bharata, Prithu, Deva, Rishi, and Agni; as well as the Vedanga and the Adi Kalpa.
- Aspects of religious geography, and in this context description of Jambudvipa and Bharata-varsha, and certain other locations identified as islands and landmasses like Anudvipa, Ketumaala-varsha.
- About 20% of the chapters are related to Lalitopakhyana, that is highlighting the goddess theology and her central importance
- Over 35% of the chapters in the text is Adhyatma Ramayana, an Advaita Vedanta treatise of over 65 chapters and 4,500 verses.
- Another 30% of the chapters approximately, or 47 chapters, are geographical Mahatmyas to various locations across India, such as those in modern Kashmir, Odisha and Tamil Nadu. Geography-related Mahatmyas are travel guides for pilgrimage, describing rivers, temples and scenes to visit.

The Adhyatma Ramayana, a text consisting about 4,500 verses in 65 chapters and divided into seven Kandas (books). The Nasiketopkhyana, a text in 18 chapters, the Pinakinimahatmya, a text in 12 chapters, the Virajakshetramahatmya and the Kanchimahatmya, a text in 32 chapters are embedded in this Purana.

== See also ==
- List Of Hindu Texts
- Hindu Cosmology

== Bibliography ==
- Bailey, Gregory (2003). Sharma, Arvind (ed.). The Study of Hinduism. University of South Carolina Press. ISBN 978-1-57003-449-7.
- Collins, Charles Dillard (1988). The Iconography and Ritual of Siva at Elephanta: On Life, Illumination, and Being. SUNY Press. ISBN 978-0-88706-773-0.
- Dalal, Rosen (2014). Hinduism: An Alphabetical Guide. Penguin. ISBN 978-8184752779.
- Dikshitar, V.R. Ramachandra (1951). The Purana Index: A-N. Madras University Historical Series, No. 19. Vol. 1. University of Madras. ISBN 978-81-209-1274-8.
- Dimmitt, Cornelia; Van Buitenen, J.A.B. (2012) [1978]. Classical Hindu Mythology: A Reader in the Sanskrit Purāṇas. Philadelphia: Temple University Press. ISBN 978-1-4399-0464-0.
- Doniger, Wendy, ed. (1993). Purāṇa Perennis: Reciprocity and Transformation in Hindu and Jaina Texts. Albany, New York: State University of New York Press. ISBN 0-7914-1382-9.
- Flood, Gavin (1996). An Introduction to Hinduism. Cambridge: Cambridge University Press. ISBN 0-521-43878-0.
- Gietz, K.P.; et al. (1992). Epic and Puranic Bibliography (Up to 1985) Annotated and with Indexes: Part I: A - R, Part II: S - Z, Indexes. Otto Harrassowitz Verlag. ISBN 978-3-447-03028-1.
- Glucklich, Ariel (2008). The Strides of Vishnu: Hindu Culture in Historical Perspective. Oxford University Press. ISBN 978-0-19-971825-2.
- Hazra, Rajendra Chandra (1962). "The Puranas". In Radhakrishnan, S. (ed.). The Cultural Heritage of India. Vol. 2. Calcutta: The Ramakrishna Mission Institute of Culture. ISBN 81-85843-03-1.
- Hazra, Rajendra Chandra (1987) [1940]. Studies in the Puranic Records on Hindu Rites and Customs. Motilal Banarsidass. ISBN 978-81-208-0422-7.
- Hinzler, H.I.R. (1993). "Balinese palm-leaf manuscripts". Journal of the Humanities and Social Sciences of Southeast Asia. 149 (3): 438–473. doi:10.1163/22134379-90003116. S2CID 162242970. Archived from the original on 2015-10-01.
- Lochtefeld, James G (2002). The Illustrated Encyclopedia of Hinduism: N-Z. Rosen Publishing. ISBN 978-0823931804.
- Rocher, Ludo (1986). The Purāṇas. Wiesbaden: Otto Harrassowitz Verlag. ISBN 3-447-02522-0.
- Brahmanda Purana. Vol. 1. Translated by Tagare, GV. Motilal Banarsidass. 1983.
- Wilson, Horace Hayman (1864). The Vishnu Purana: A System of Hindu Mythology and Tradition. Vol. 1. Read Country Books. ISBN 1-84664-664-2.
- Winternitz, M. (1927). A History of Indian Literature. Vol. 1. Translated by Ketkar, S. University of Calcutta.
- "Brahmanda Purana" (PDF). sanskritdocuments.org (in Sanskrit). Archived from the original (PDF) on 11 March 2016.
