= Kaikulangara Rama Variar =

Indian scholar, astrologer and astronomer (1832–1897)

- Born: 1832
- Died: October 5, 1897 (aged 64–65)
- Occupations: Scholar; poet; astrologer; astronomer

Kaikulangara Rama Variar (also spelled Warrier; 1832–1897) was an Indian scholar, poet, astrologer and astronomer from Kadangode, Thrissur district, Kerala, India.

== Early life ==
The third child of Kaikulangara Kizhakke Variathu Narayani Varasyar (his mother) and Kaithakkottu Narayana Bhattathiri (his father). After initial lessons in Ayurveda and Jyotisha from his maternal uncles, Rama Variar moved to Thrippunithura for education when he was 12 years old. Once there, he joined members of the Cochin royal family in receiving an education. For three years, he was taught Alankara Shastra (science of aesthetics), Vyākaraṇa (grammar), and Tarka Shastra (logic) from Palappurath Puthiyetath Govindan Nampiyar. Following his early studies, Rama Variar spent 3 years at Killikkurissimangalam reading aloud the Sanskrit epic- the Mahabharata, in the presence of his guru's mother as a gift and fee (gurudakshina) for Govindan Nampiyar.

After leaving Thrippunithura, Rama Variar spent a few years at Thrissur, teaching Sanskrit to local children, before moving to the Punnathur royal family residence to tutor family members. He then travelled to the northern parts of present-day Kerala and stayed for a few years at the residence of the Mayipadi royal family. Whilst there, Rama Variar met Yogananda Swamikal, an ascetic visiting the nearby Edneer Mutt. Rama Variyar requested that the Swamikal teach him the details of the Brahmasutra, which the Swamikal did over about four months. According to accounts, Swamikal, recognizing his student's intellectual abilities, invited him to join his journey to Mukambi and awarded Rama Variyar three titles: Vagdasan, Ramanandanathan and Panditaparsavendran. Returning home, Rama Variyar continued teaching Sanskrit and married Thekke Variyath Kutty Varasyar.

== Rama Variar's association with printing presses ==
Rama Variar collaborated with the printing industry in the Kunnamkulam area of Thrissur district, contributing to the availability of printed scholarly works. The establishment of the Vidyaratnaprabha Printing Press by Paramel Ittoop in Kunnamkulam was a key factor in this collaboration. In 1883, at the urging of Paramel Ittoop, Rama Variyar moved his family to Kunnamkulam to focus on his scholarly work. One of his first publications was a corrected edition of Ezhuthacchan's Adhyatma Ramayanam in Malayalam. Several of Rama Variyar's early works were printed at Vidyaratnaprabha Printing Press. Later, the manager of this press started his printing press in Thrissur, which took over the responsibility of printing and distributing Rama Variyar's books. Most of Rama Variyar's published works were translations and commentaries on well-known Sanskrit texts.

== Final years ==
The death of one of his daughters affected him significantly. He left Thrissur to stay at his home in Thrikkandiyur. He spent his final years in relative poverty before dying on October 5, 1897.

== Biography ==
- Balakrishna Warrier, A. (1997). Kaikulangara Rama warrier. Government of Kerala.
