= Adhyatma Ramayana =

Sanskrit text

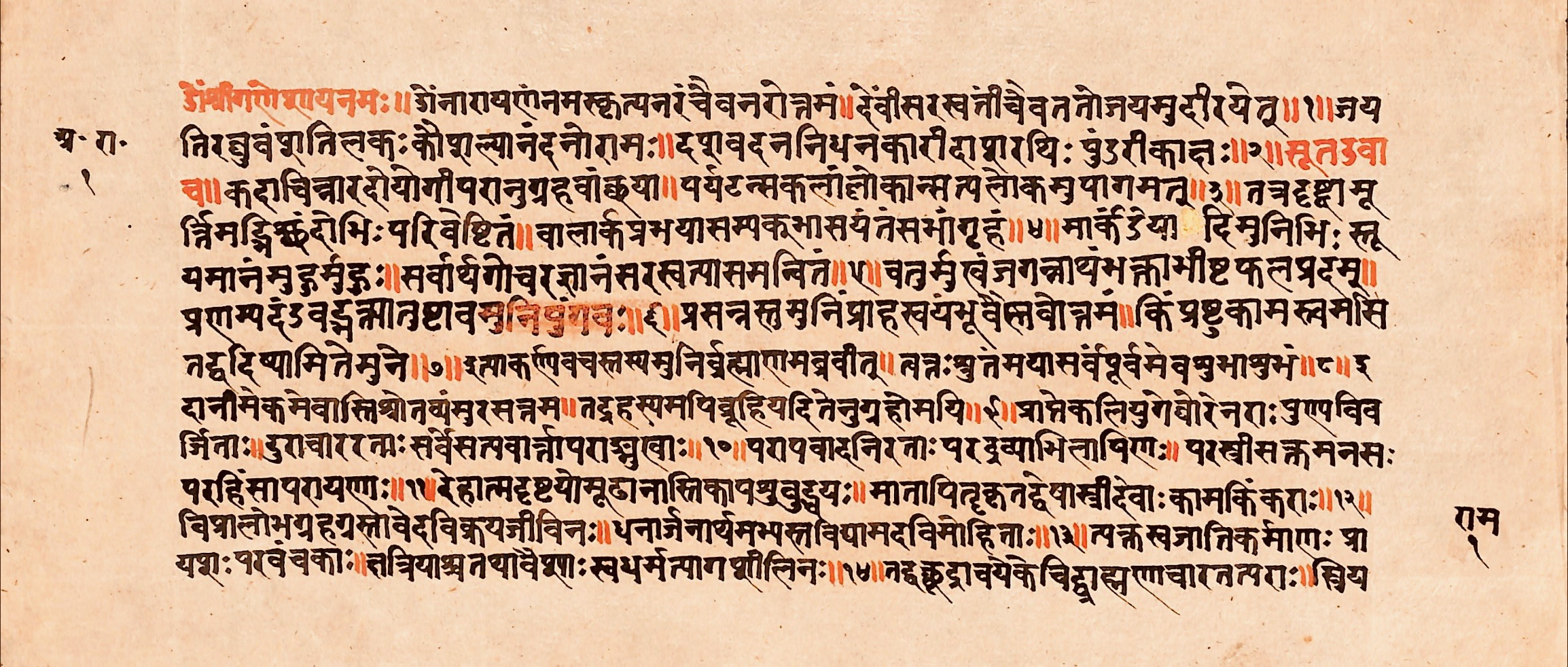
Adhyatma Ramayana verses 1.1 – 1.14 in a Brahmanda Purana manuscript (Sanskrit, Devanagari)

Adhyatma Ramayana (IAST: Adhyātma Rāmāyaṇa, lit. 'Spiritual Ramayana') is a 13th- to 15th-century Sanskrit text that allegorically interprets the story of Hindu epic Ramayana in the Advaita Vedanta framework. It is embedded in the latter portion of Brahmānda Purana, and the author is considered to be Vyasa. The Hindu tradition also attributes the text to the Bhakti movement saint Ramananda.

The text consists of 7 books, 65 chapters or 4,500 verses in the form of a dialogue between Shiva and Parvati. Adhyatma Ramayana contains the ideal characteristics of Rama and the precepts related to devotion, knowledge, dispassion, adoration and good conduct. Rama is presented as the supreme Brahman in the text, while the struggles of Sita and himself are re-interpreted in an abstract spiritual form. The allegory inspired several later versions of the Ramayana story in languages like Awadhi (Ramcharitmanas by Tulsidas), Oriya, Bengali and Malayalam version by Thunchaththu Ezhuthachan.

== Name ==
The word Adhyatma (Sanskrit: अध्यात्म) means "transcendental, relating to Atman (self, soul)".

== Significance ==
Adhyatma Ramayana represents the story of Rama in a spiritual context. The text constitutes over 35% of the chapters of Brahmanda Purana, often circulated as an independent text in the Vaishnavism tradition, and is an Advaita Vedanta treatise of over 65 chapters and 4,500 verses.

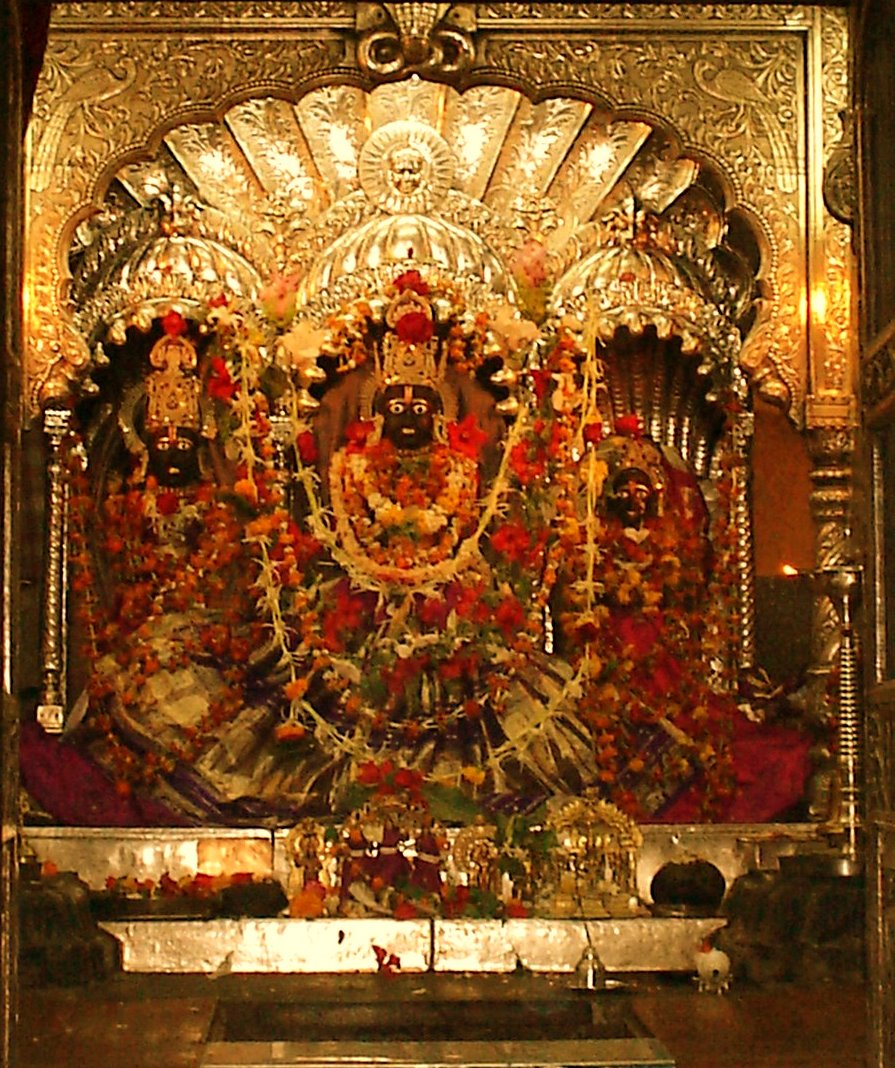
Rama, Lakshmana and Sita

The text represents Rama as the Brahman (metaphysical reality), mapping all saguna (attributes) of Rama to the nirguna nature (ultimate unchanging attributeless virtues and ideals). Adhyatma Ramayana raises every mundane activity of Rama to a spiritual or transcendent level, the story into symbolism, thus instructing the seeker to view his or her own life through the symbolic vision for his soul, where the external life is but a metaphor for the eternal journey of the soul in Advaita terminology.

The book is aimed to be used as a guide and a ready source of instruction for a spiritual seeker, as it presents the Ramayana as a divine allegory. The text influenced the popular Ramcharitmanas by Tulsidas.

== Overview ==
The Adhyatma Ramayana is organized into seven Kandas, or chapters:
1. Bala Kanda – This chapter begins with the description of Brahmaswarup, the cosmic and celestial appearance of Lord Rama as an avatar of Vishnu, who descended to earth as a human being to remove rakshasas(demons) such as Ravana. It includes Rama's childhood and the story of Ahilya's deliverance by Rama.
2. Ayodhya Kanda – Life in Ayodhya, including Rama's exile, the death of his father Dasarath, etc.
3. Aranya Kanda – The forest (Aranya) chapter, which includes the kidnapping of Sita by Ravana.
4. Kishkindha Kanda – the episode of Kishkindha. This chapter describes the killing of Bali, and the initiation of the active search for Sita.
5. Sundar Kanda – details Hanuman's arrival and activities in Lanka.
6. Lanka Kanda – corresponding to the Yuddha Kanda of the Valmiki Ramayana. It contains details of the battles between Rama's armies and Ravana, the killing of Ravana, and the coronation of Rama upon his return to Ayodhya from Lanka.
7. Uttara Kanda – Epilogue. It includes the banishment of Sita, the birth of Lava and Kusha – the sons of Rama and Sita – and Rama's departure from the earth to Vaikuntha, the abode of Lord Vishnu. The fifth adhyaya (sub-chapter) of the Uttar Kanda describes a conversation between Lord Rama and his brother Lakshmana, often referred to as the Rama Gita (the song of Rama). It is essentially an Advaitic philosophical work.

== Translations ==
=== South Asian languages ===
- Bhanubhakta Acharya translated Ramayan from Sanskrit to Nepali.
- Beladakere Suryanarayana Shastri, Adhyatma Ramayana, Kannada translation with Sanskrit original, Shri Jayachamaraja Granthamala, Series 47, Mysore, 1948.
- Gita Press translation of Adhyatma Ramayana from Sanskrit to Hindi.

=== English translations ===
1. Swami Tapasyananda, Adhyatma Ramayana, Original Sanskrit, with English Translation, Sri Ramakrishna Math, Madras. 1985.
2. Baij Nath Puri, Lala Baij Nath. The Adhyatma Ramayana, Cosmo Publications, 2005. ISBN 81-7755-895-1.
3. Subir Kumar Sen, Adhyatma Ramayanam from Sanskrit to English, Shastra Dharma Prachar Sabha, 2012. ISBN 978-81-920022-1-7

== See also ==
- Adhyathmaramayanam Kilippattu
- Ramayana
- Ramcharitmanas by Tulsidas
