= Thunchan Parambu, Tirur =

Thunjan Parambu
- Village
- Thunjan Parambu

- Location in Kerala, India Thunjan Parambu (India)
- Coordinates: 10°54′0″N 75°54′0″E
- Country: India
- State: Kerala
- District: Malappuram

Government
  - Body: Tirur Municipality

Languages
  - Official: Malayalam, English
- Time zone: UTC+5:30 (IST)
- PIN: 676104
- Telephone code: 0494-242****
- Vehicle registration: KL-10 & KL-55
- Lok Sabha constituency: Ponnani
- Civic agency: Tirur Municipality
- Climate: Tropical (Köppen)

Thunchan Parambu is a village in Tirur, Kerala, South India. It is 2 km south west of Tirur railway station and 28 km west of the District Headquarters city. It is a residential area.

== Transportation ==
Thunjan parambu village connects to other parts of India through Tirur town. National highway No.66 passes through Kottakkal and the northern stretch connects to Goa and Mumbai. The southern stretch connects to Cochin and Trivandrum. Highway No.966 goes to Palakkad and Coimbatore. The nearest airport is at Calicut. The nearest major railway station is at Tirur.

== Gallery ==
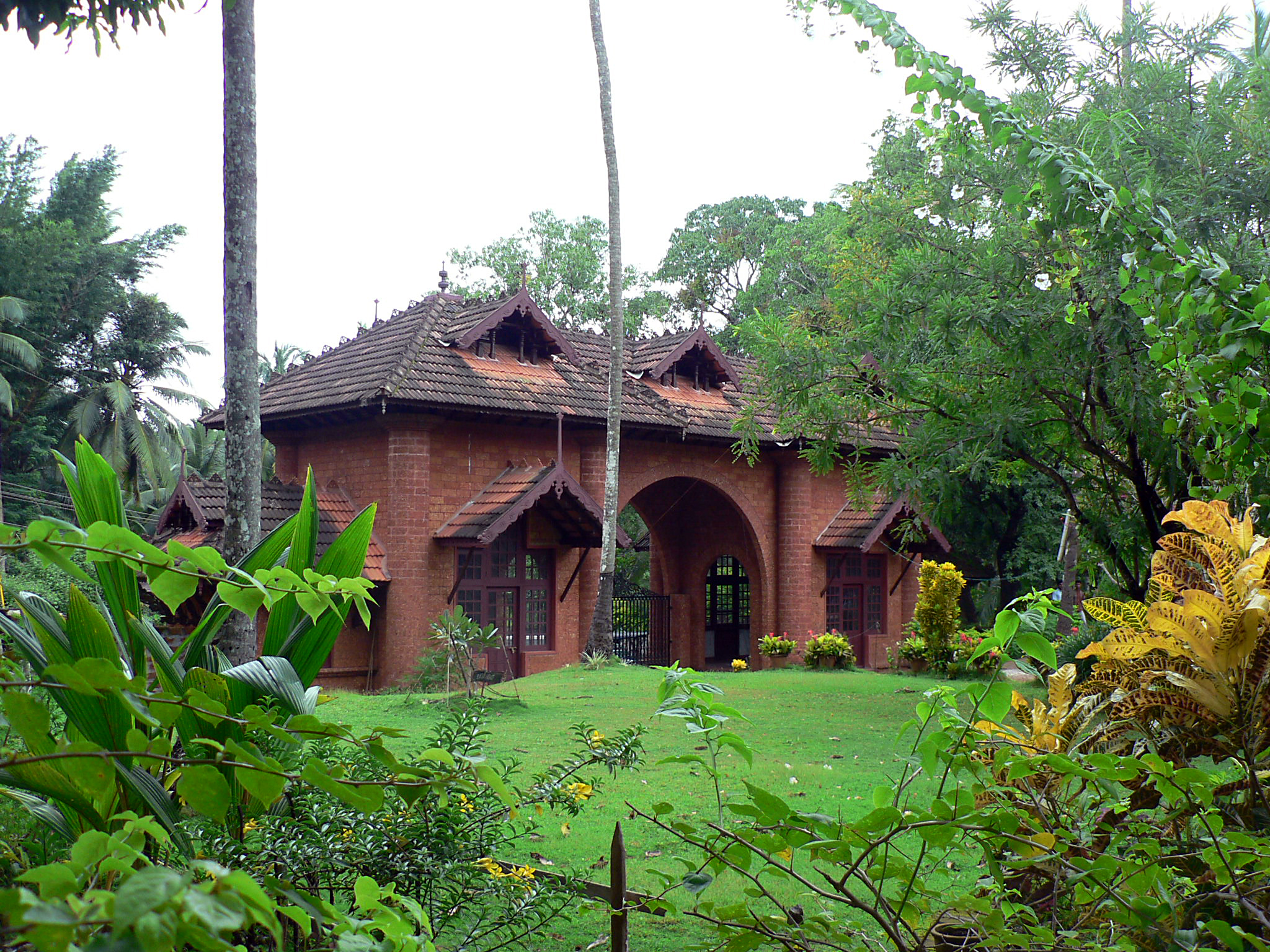
Gate inside view

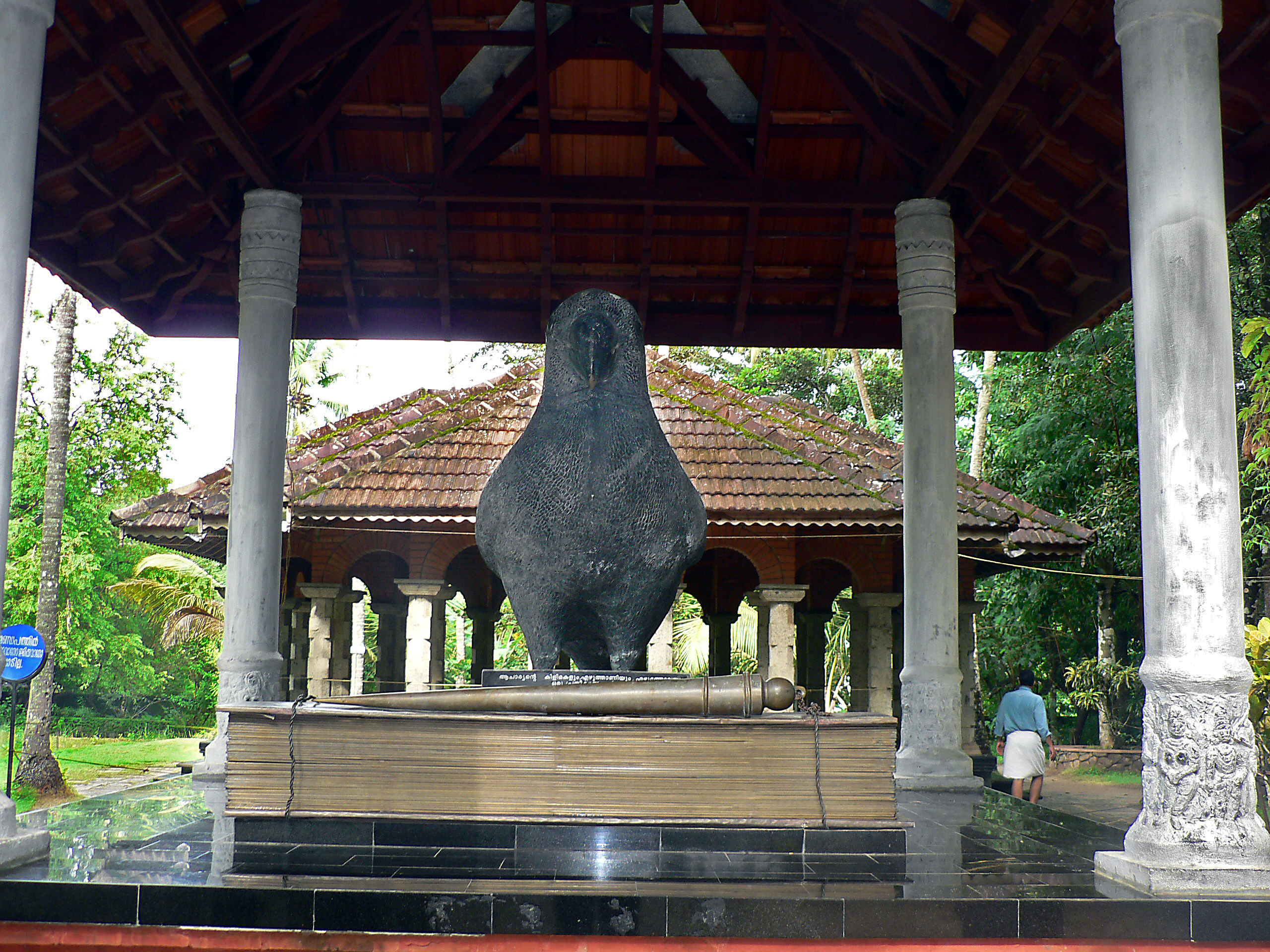
Thunjan Parambu.

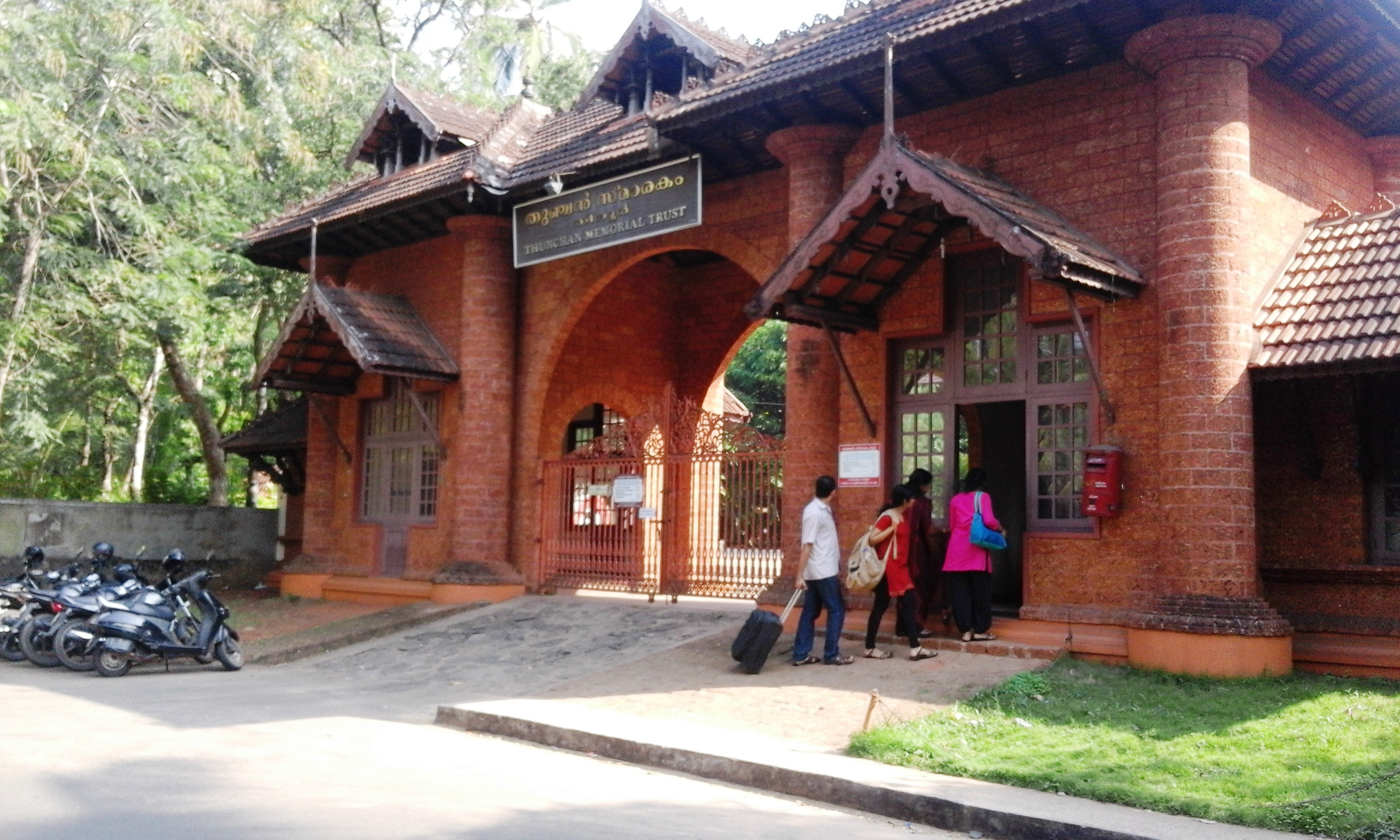
Gate front view

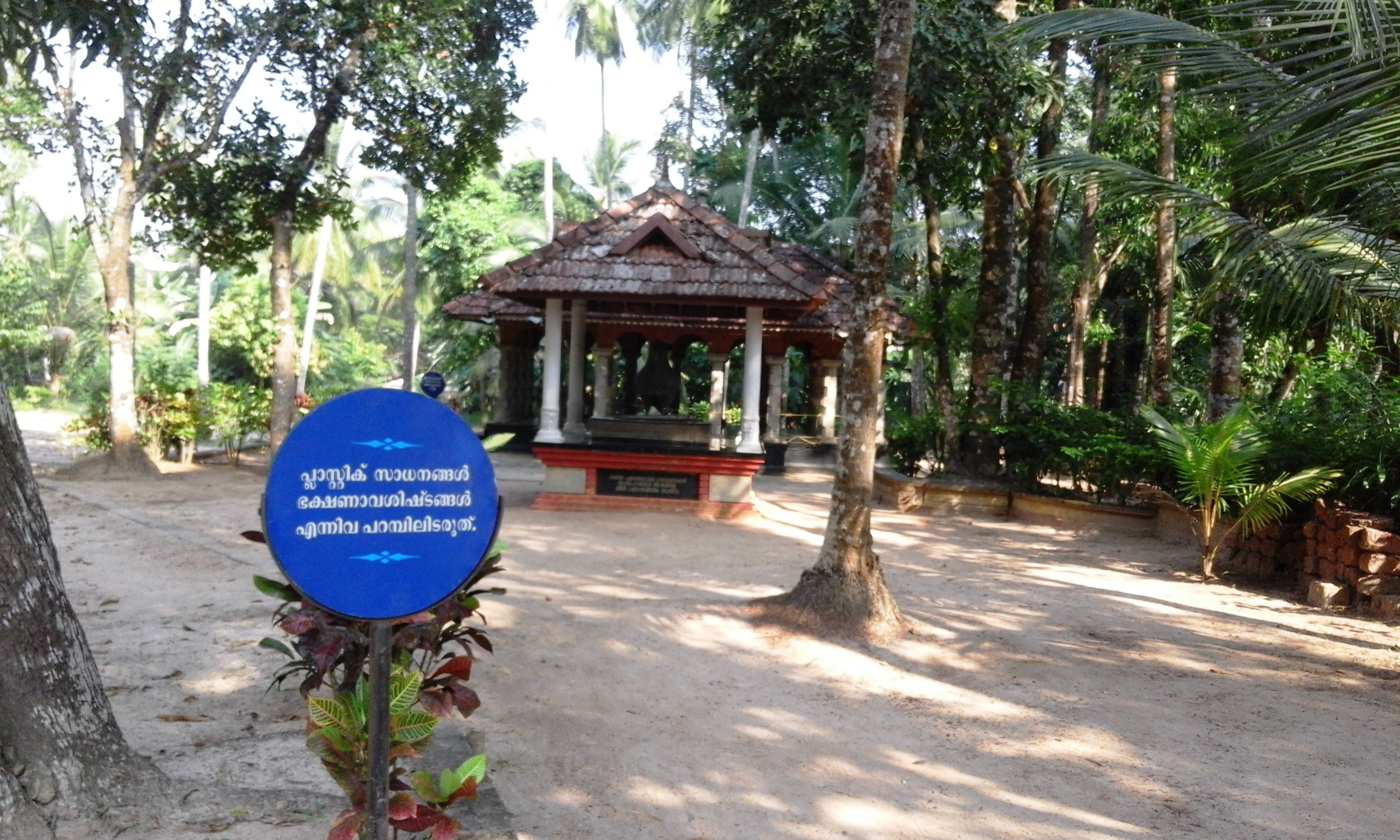
Plastic not allowed

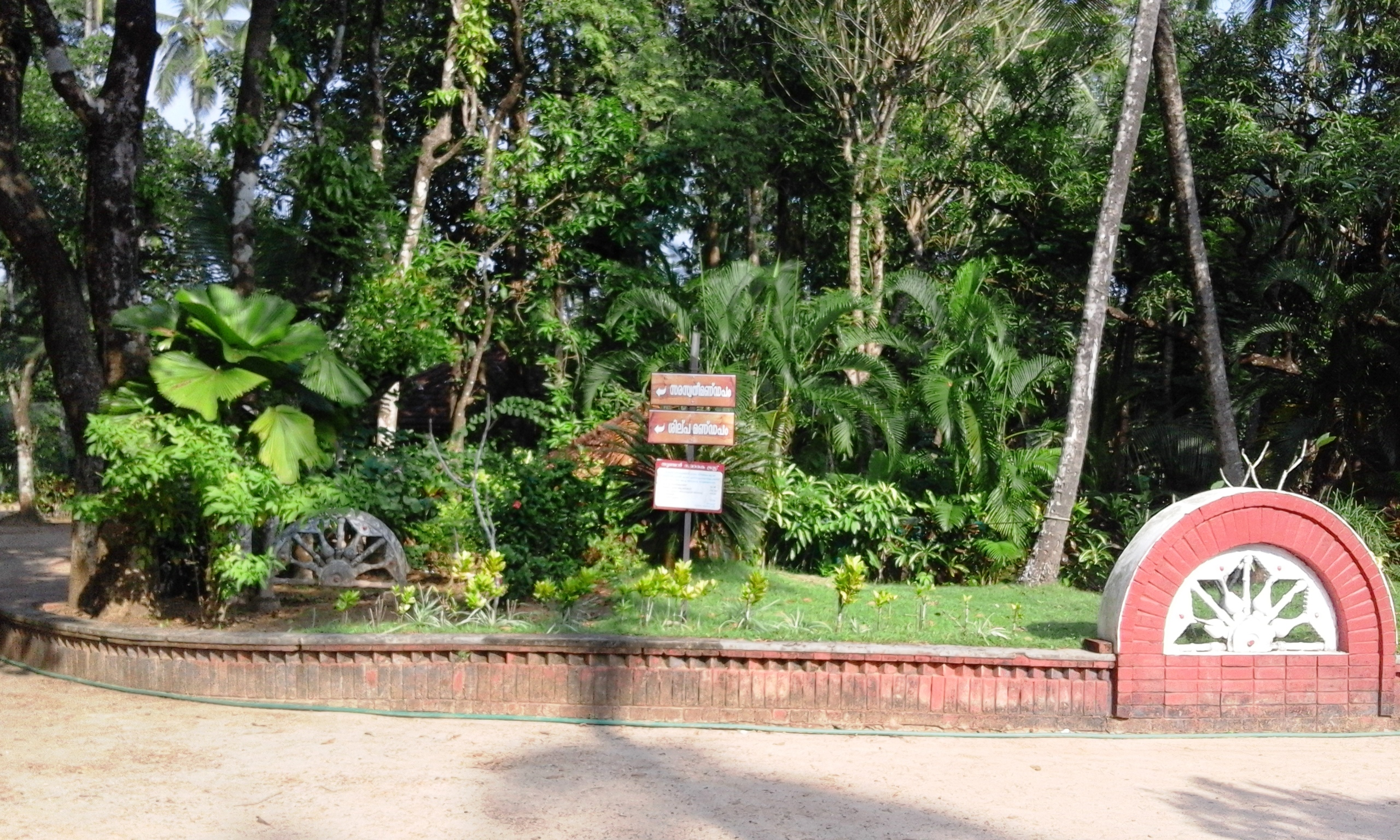
First garden

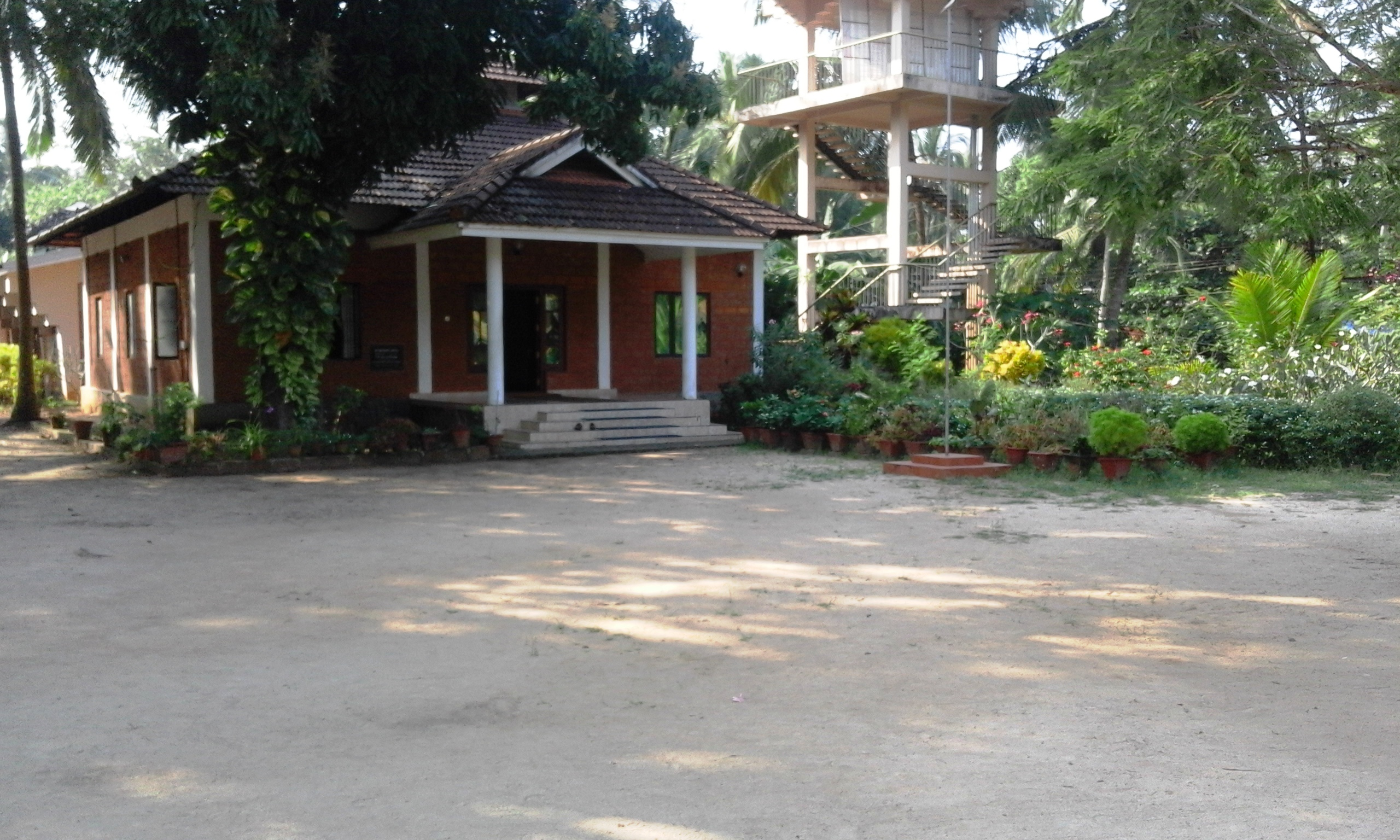
Office

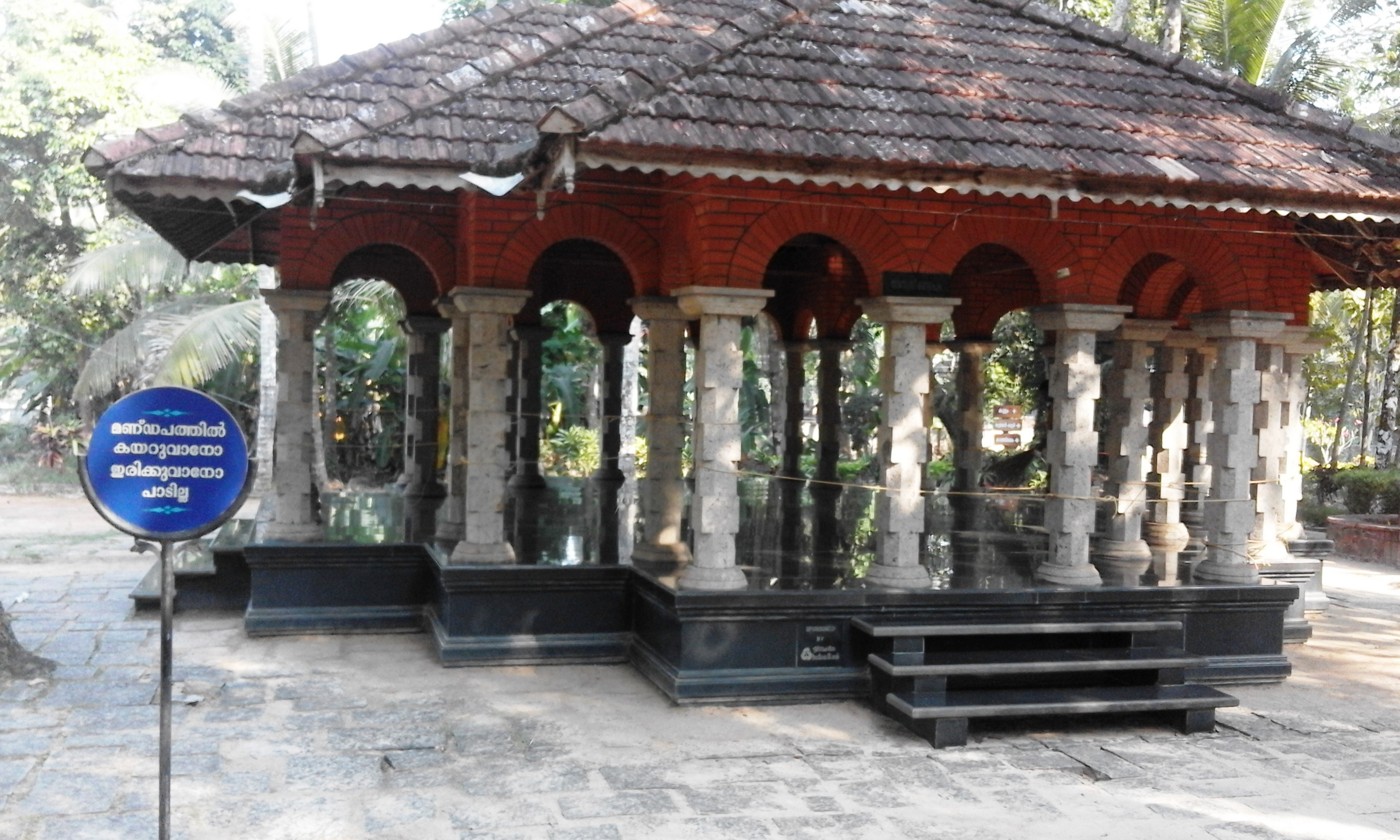
Dance Stage

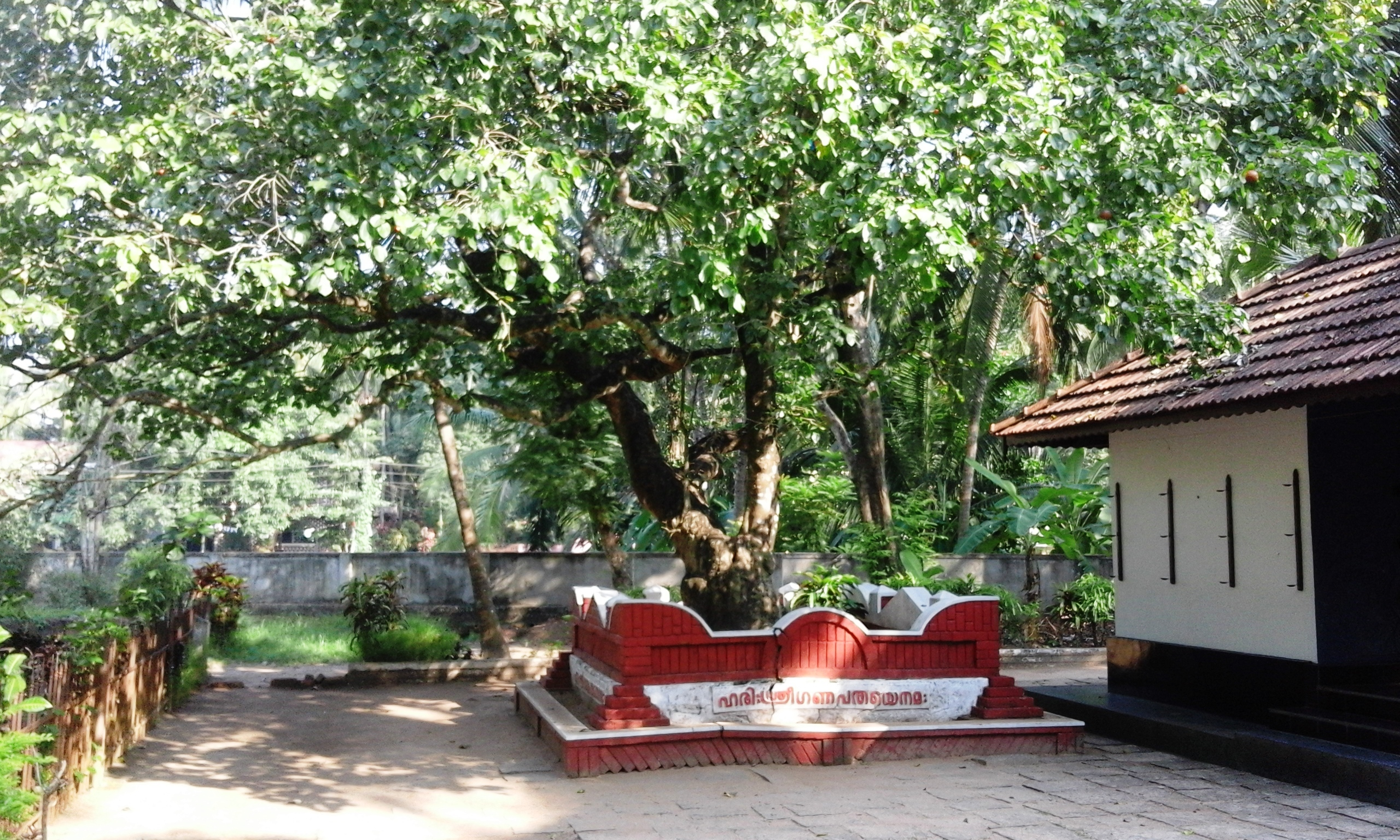
The Temple in Kerala Style with the Bunyan Tree

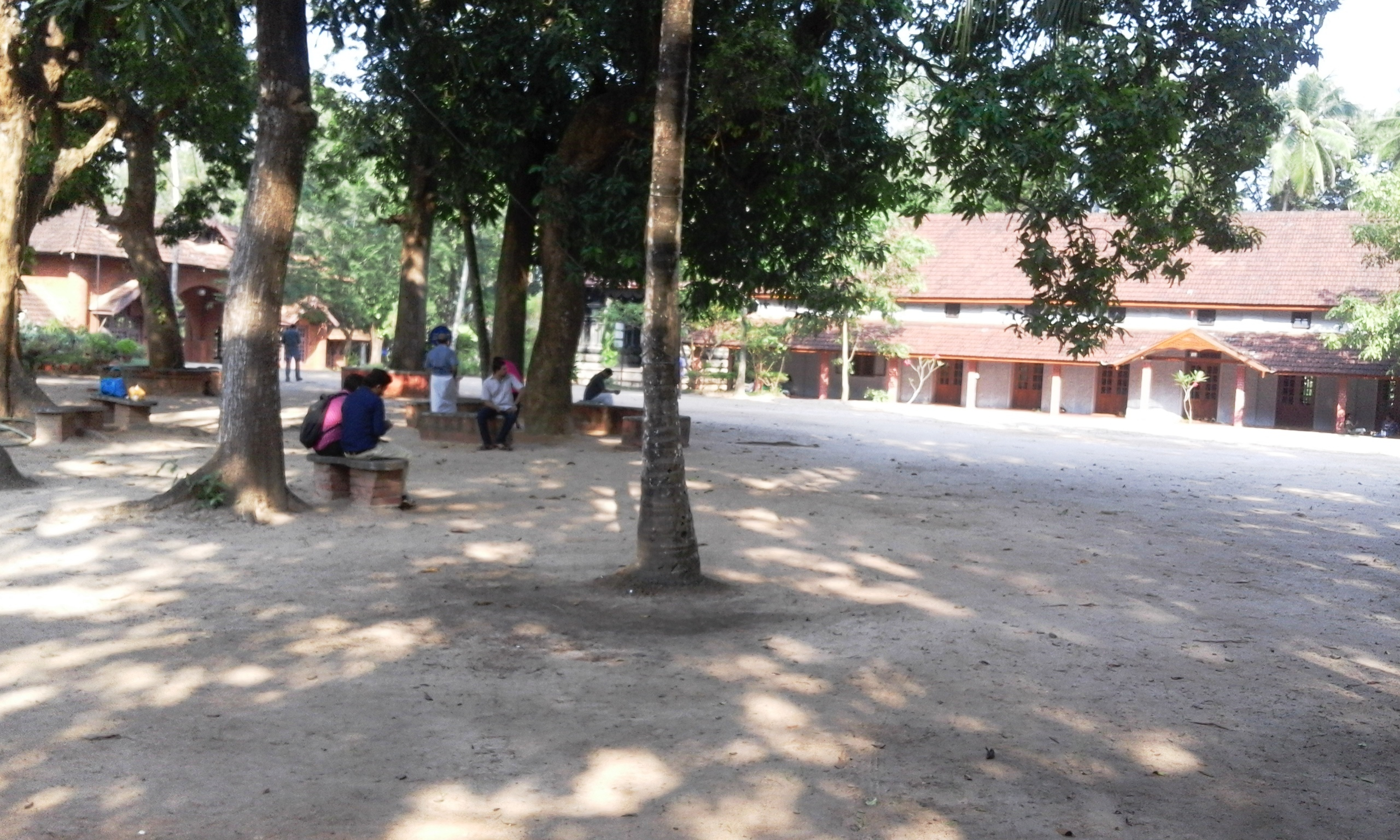
The Park inside the Memorial

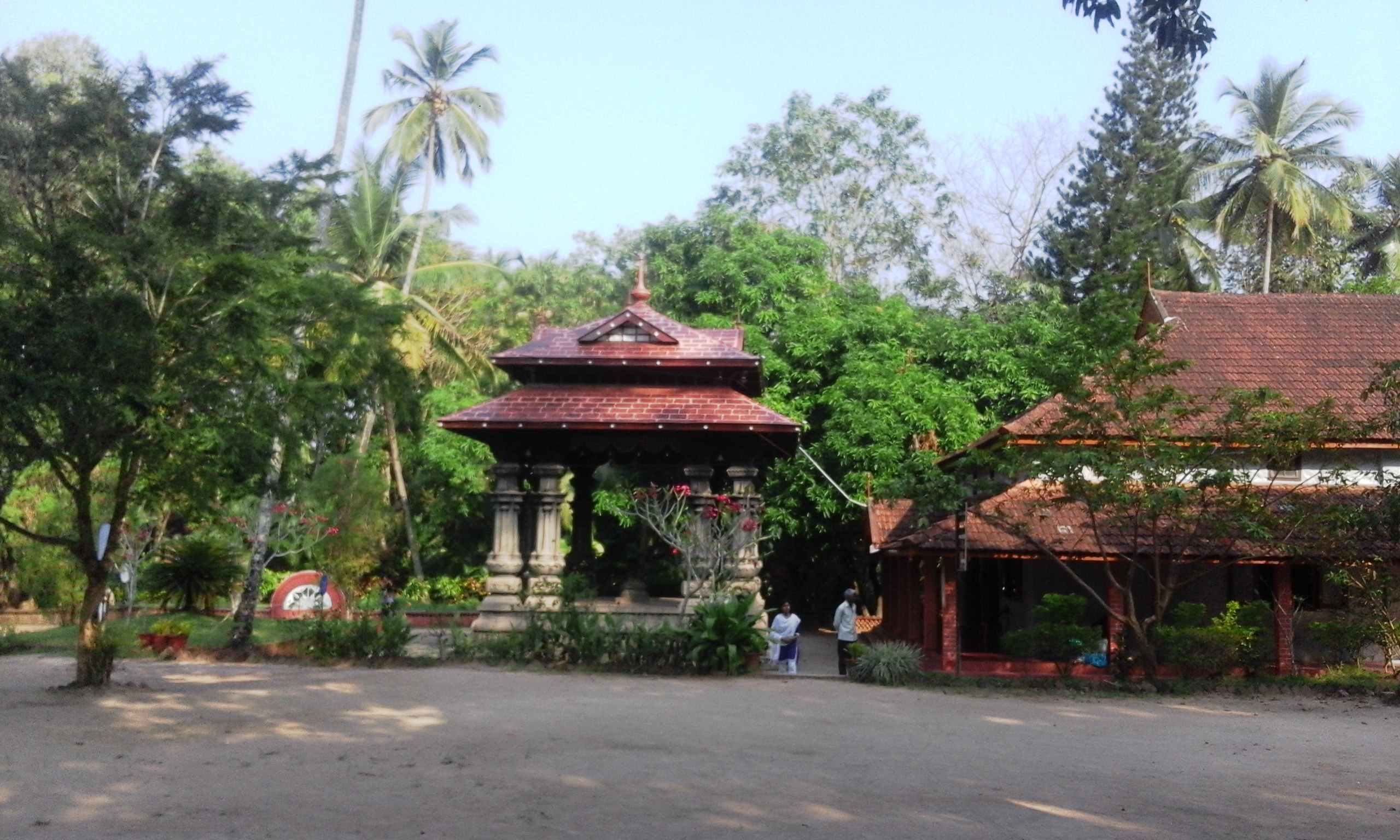
The mandapam and the auditorium
