= 1990s =

Decade of the Gregorian calendar (1990–1999)

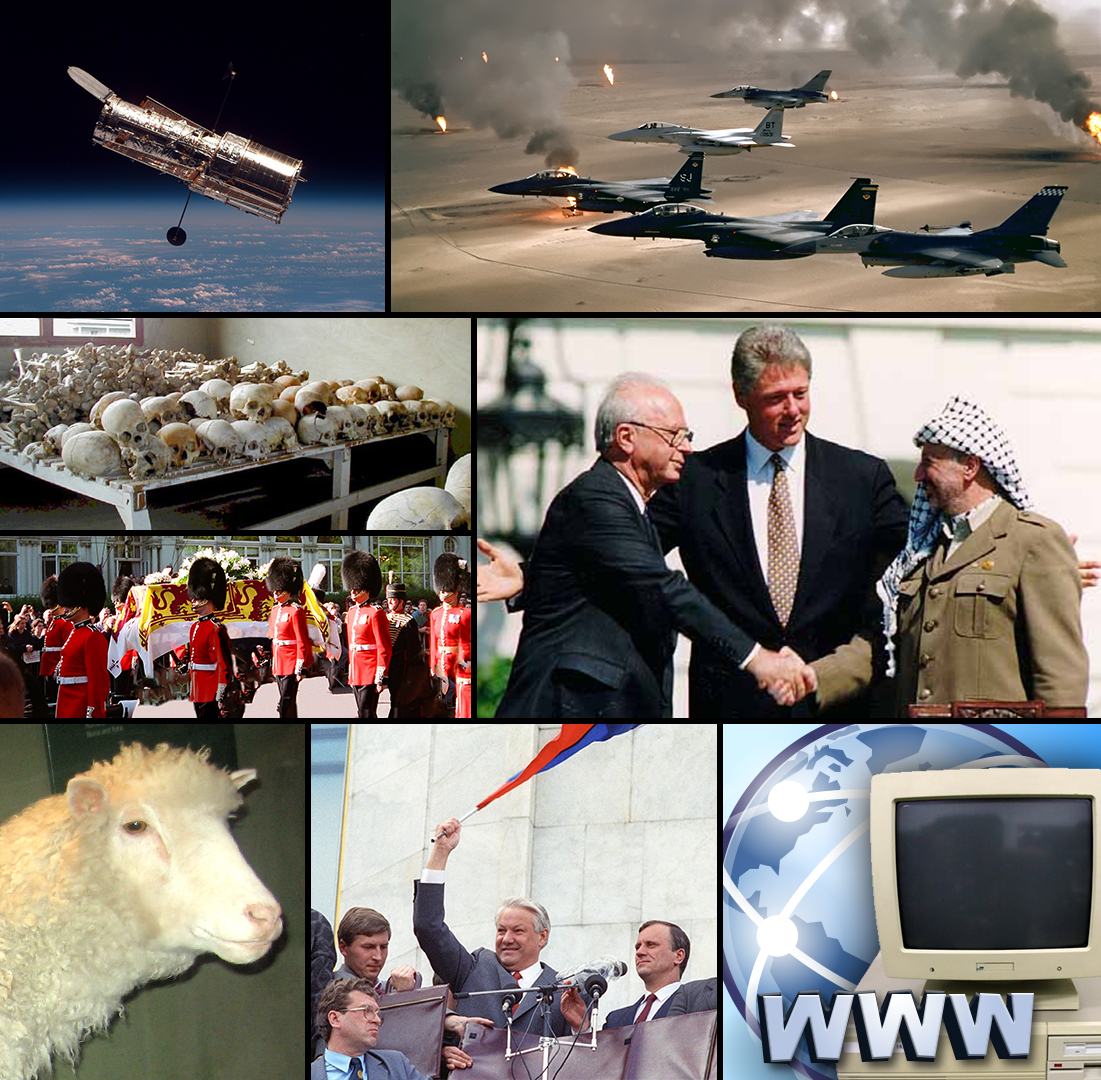
Clockwise from top-left: The Hubble Space Telescope orbits the Earth after it was launched in 1990; American jets fly over burning oil fields in the 1991 Gulf War; The Oslo Accords on 13 September 1993; The World Wide Web gains popularity worldwide; Boris Yeltsin greets crowds after the failed August Coup, which leads to the dissolution of the Soviet Union on 26 December 1991; Dolly the sheep is the first mammal to be cloned from an adult somatic cell; The funeral procession of Diana, Princess of Wales, who died in a 1997 car crash; Hundreds of thousands of Tutsi people are killed in the Rwandan genocide of 1994.

The 1990s (often referred to as and shortened to "the '90s" or "the Nineties") was a decade that began on 1 January 1990, and ended on 31 December 1999. Known as the "post-Cold War decade", the 1990s were culturally imagined as the period from the Revolutions of 1989 until the September 11 attacks in 2001. The dissolution of the Soviet Union marked the end of Russia's status as a superpower, the end of a multipolar world, and the rise of anti-Western sentiment. China was still recovering from a politically and economically turbulent period, allowing the US to emerge as the world's sole superpower, creating relative peace and prosperity for many western countries. During this decade, the world population grew from 5.3 to 6.1 billion.

The decade saw greater attention to multiculturalism and advance of alternative media. Public education about safe sex curbed HIV in developed countries. Generation X bonded over musical tastes. Humor in television and film was marked by ironic self-references mixed with popular culture references. Alternative music movements like grunge, reggaeton, Eurodance, K-pop, and hip-hop, became popular, aided by the rise in satellite and cable television, and the internet. New music genres such as drum and bass, post-rock, happy hardcore, denpa, and trance emerged. Video game popularity exploded due to the development of CD-ROM supported 3D computer graphics on platforms such as Sony PlayStation, Nintendo 64, and PCs.

The 1990s saw advances in technology, with the World Wide Web, evolution of the Pentium microprocessor, rechargeable lithium-ion batteries, the first gene therapy trial, and cloning. The Human Genome Project was launched in 1990, by the National Institutes of Health (NIH) with the goal to sequence the entire human genome. Building the Large Hadron Collider, the world's largest and highest-energy particle accelerator, commenced in 1998, and Nasdaq became the first US stock market to trade online. Environmentalism is divided between left-wing green politics, primary industry-sponsored environmentalist front organizations, and a more business-oriented approach to the regulation of carbon footprint of businesses. More businesses started using information technology.

There was a realignment and consolidation of economic and political power, such as the continued mass-mobilization of capital markets through neoliberalism, globalization, and end of the Cold War. Network cultures were enhanced by the proliferation of new media such as the internet, and a new ability to self-publish web pages and make connections on professional, political and hobby topics. The digital divide was immediate, with access limited to those who could afford it and knew how to operate a computer. The internet provided anonymity for individuals skeptical of the government. Traditional mass media continued to perform strongly. However, mainstream internet users were optimistic about its benefits, particularly the future of e-commerce. Web portals, a curated bookmark homepage, were as popular as searching via web crawlers. The dot-com bubble of 1997–2000 brought wealth to some entrepreneurs before its crash of the early-2000s.

Many countries were economically prosperous and spreading globalization. High-income countries experienced steady growth during the Great Moderation (1980s—2000s). Using a mobile phone in a public place was typical conspicuous consumption. In contrast, the GDP of former Soviet Union states declined as a result of neoliberal restructuring. International trade increased with the establishment of the European Union (EU) in 1993, North American Free Trade Agreement (NAFTA) in 1994, and World Trade Organization (WTO) in 1995. The Asia-Pacific economies of the Four Asian Tigers, ASEAN, Australia and Japan were hampered by the 1997 Asian financial crisis and early 1990s recession.

Major wars that began include the First and Second Congo Wars, the Rwandan Civil War and genocide, the Somali Civil War, and Sierra Leone Civil War in Africa; the Yugoslav Wars and Bosnian Genocide in Southeast Europe; the First and Second Chechen Wars, in the former Soviet Union; and the Gulf War in the Middle East. The Afghanistan conflict (1978–present) and Colombian conflict continued. The Oslo Accords seemed to herald an end to the Israeli–Palestinian conflict, but this was in vain. However, in Northern Ireland, the Troubles came to a standstill in 1998 with the Good Friday Agreement, ending 30 years of violence.

== Politics and wars ==
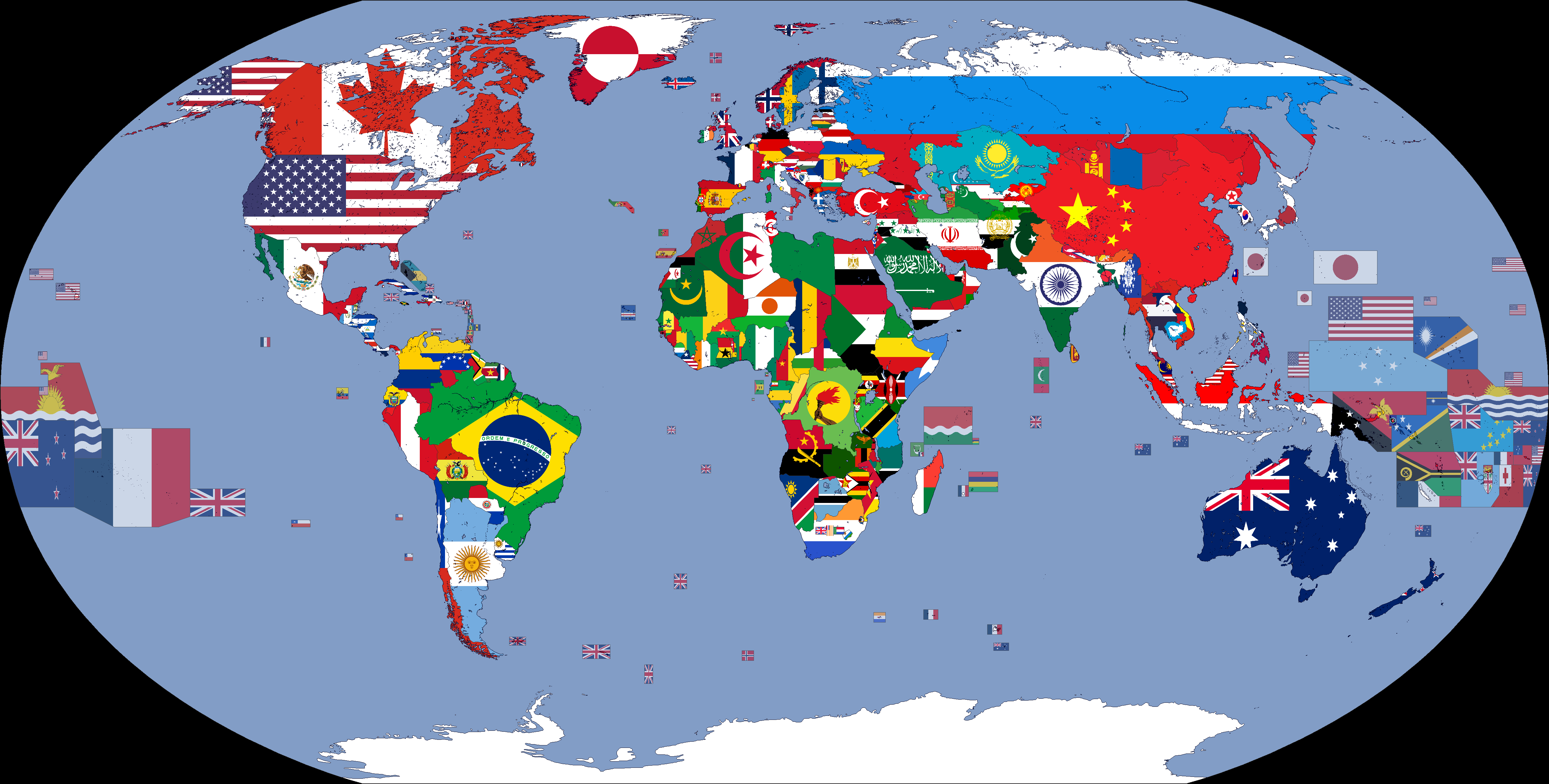
Flag map of the world from 1992

=== International wars ===
- The Congo Wars began in the 1990s.
  - The First Congo War (24 October 1996 – 16 May 1997) resulted in the overthrow of dictator Mobutu Sese Seko, following his 32-year rule of Zaire, which was then renamed the Democratic Republic of the Congo.
  - The Second Congo War (August 1998 – July 2003) started in Central Africa and involved multiple nearby nations.
- The Gulf War (2 August 1990 – 28 February 1991).
  - Iraq was left in severe debt after the Iran–Iraq War in the 1980s. President Saddam Hussein accused Kuwait of flooding the oil market, therefore driving down prices. As a result, Iraqi forces invaded and conquered Kuwait.
  - The UN (United Nations) immediately condemned the action and a coalition force led by the United States was sent to the Persian Gulf. Aerial bombing of Iraq began in January 1991, and one month later, the UN forces drove the Iraqi army from Kuwait in four days.
- Two wars were fought in the region of Chechnya:
  - The First Chechen War (1994–1996) was a conflict between the Russian Federation and the Chechen Republic of Ichkeria. After the initial campaign of 1994–1995, culminating in the devastating Battle of Grozny, Russian federal forces attempted to seize control of the mountainous area of Chechnya. Despite Russia's overwhelming manpower, weaponry, and air support, they were set back by Chechen guerrillas and raids on the flatlands. The resulting widespread demoralization of Russian federal forces, and the universal opposition of the Russian public to the conflict, led Boris Yeltsin's government to declare a ceasefire in 1996 and sign a peace treaty a year later.
  - The Second Chechen War (1999 – 2009) was started by the Russian Federation in response to the 1999 invasion of Dagestan and the Russian apartment bombings, which were blamed on the Chechens. In this military campaign, Russian forces largely recaptured the separatist region of Chechnya and the outcome of the First Chechen War – in which the region gained de facto independence as the Chechen Republic of Ichkeria – was essentially reversed.
- The Eritrean–Ethiopian War (1998–2000) was commenced by the invasion of Ethiopia by Eritrea due to a territorial dispute. The conflict resulted in tens of thousands of deaths on both sides and a peace agreement in December 2000.
- The Kargil War (1999) began in May when Pakistan covertly made troops to occupy strategic peaks in Kashmir. A month later, the Kargil War with India resulted in a political fiasco for Pakistani prime minister Nawaz Sharif, followed by a Pakistani military withdrawal to the Line of Control. The incident led to a Pakistani military coup in October, in which Sharif was ousted by Army Chief Pervez Musharraf. This conflict remains the only war fought between the two declared nuclear powers.

Executive council building burns in Sarajevo after being hit by Bosnian Serb artillery in the Bosnian War.

- The Yugoslav Wars (1991–2001) followed the breakup of Yugoslavia, beginning on 25 June 1991, after the republics of Croatia and Slovenia declared independence from Yugoslavia. These wars were notorious for war crimes and human rights violations, including ethnic cleansing and genocide, with the overwhelming majority of casualties being Muslim Bosniaks.
  - The Ten-Day War (1991) was a brief military conflict between Slovenian TO (Slovenian Territorial Defence) and the Yugoslav People's Army ("JNA") following Slovenia's declaration of independence.
  - The Croatian War of Independence (1991–1995) was fought in modern-day Croatia between the Croatian government (having declared independence from the Socialist Federal Republic of Yugoslavia) and both the Yugoslav People's Army ("JNA") and Serb forces, who established the self-proclaimed Republic of Serbian Krajina ("RSK") within Croatia.
  - The Bosnian War (1992–1995) involved several ethnically-defined factions within Bosnia and Herzegovina: Bosniaks, Serbs, and Croats, as well as a smaller Bosniak faction led by Fikret Abdić. The Siege of Sarajevo (1992–1995) marked the most violent urban warfare in Europe since World War II at that time, as Serb forces bombarded and attacked Bosnian-controlled and populated areas of the city. War crimes occurred, including ethnic cleansing and the destruction of civilian property.
  - The final fighting in the Croatian and Bosnian wars ended in 1995 with the success of Croatian military offensives against Serb forces. This led to the mass exodus of Serbs from Croatia, Serb losses to Croat and Bosniak forces, and the signing of the Dayton Agreement, which internally partitioned Bosnia and Herzegovina into a Republika Srpska and a Bosniak-Croat Federation.
- The Kosovo War (1998–1999) was a war between Albanian separatists and Yugoslav military and Serb paramilitary forces in Kosovo. That conflict began in 1996 and escalated in 1998, with increasing reports of atrocities.
  - In 1999, the NATO, led by the United States, launched air attacks against Yugoslavia (then composed of only Serbia and Montenegro) to pressure the Yugoslav government to end its military operations against Albanian separatists in Kosovo. The intervention lacked UN approval yet was justified by NATO based on accusations of war crimes committed by Yugoslav military forces working alongside nationalist Serb paramilitary groups. Finally, after months of bombing, Yugoslavia conceded to NATO's demands, and NATO forces (later UN peacekeeping forces) occupied Kosovo.
- The South African Border War (1990) was a border war between Zambia, Angola, and Namibia that began in 1966 and ended in 1990.

=== Civil wars and guerrillas (wars) ===
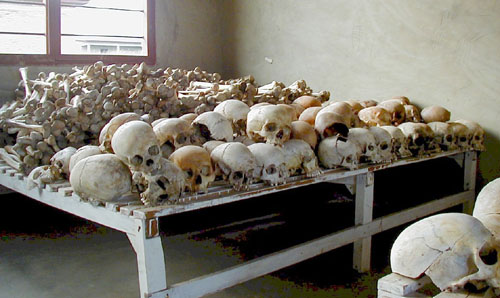
Rwandan genocide: Bones of genocide victims in Murambi Technical School. Estimates put the death toll of the Rwandan genocide as high as 800,000 people.

- The First Liberian Civil War occurred from 1989 until 1997, and led to the death of around 200,000 people.
- The Ethiopian Civil War (1991) was an internal conflict that had been raging for over twenty years. Its end coincided with the establishment of a coalition government of various factions.
- The Algerian Civil War (1991–2002) was caused by a group of high-ranking army officers canceling the first multi-party elections in Algeria.
- The Somali Civil War (1991–present) included the Battle of Mogadishu.
- The Rwandan genocide (1994) occurred from 6 April to mid-July 1994 when hundreds of thousands of Rwanda's Tutsis and Hutu political moderates were killed by the Hutu-dominated government under the Hutu Power ideology. For approximately 100 days between 500,000 and 1,000,000 people were killed. The United Nations and major states came under criticism for failing to stop the genocide.
- 1993 Russian constitutional crisis resulted from a severe political deadlock between Russian president Boris Yeltsin and the Supreme Soviet (Russia's parliament at this time) resulting in Yeltsin ordering the controversial shelling of the Russian parliament building by tanks.
- The Tajikistani Civil War (1992–1997) occurred when the Tajikistan government was pitted against the United Tajik Opposition, resulting in the death of between 50,000 and 100,000 people.
- The Zapatista uprising (1994) occurred when a large number of the Zapatista indigenous people of Mexico formed the Zapatista Army of National Liberation and began an armed conflict with the Mexican government to protest against NAFTA. The uprising lasted 12 days, bringing worldwide attention to the Zapatistas, and continued through the rest of the 1990s.
- The Islamic Emirate of Afghanistan (1996–2001) was formed at the end of the Afghan Civil War, when the Taliban seized control of Afghanistan in 1996. They ruled during the later Afghan Civil War until their ousting 2001.
- The Troubles in Northern Ireland (1998) involved 30 years of conflict that ended on 10 April 1998, when the Good Friday Agreement was signed.
- 1999 East Timorese crisis.

=== Terrorist attacks ===
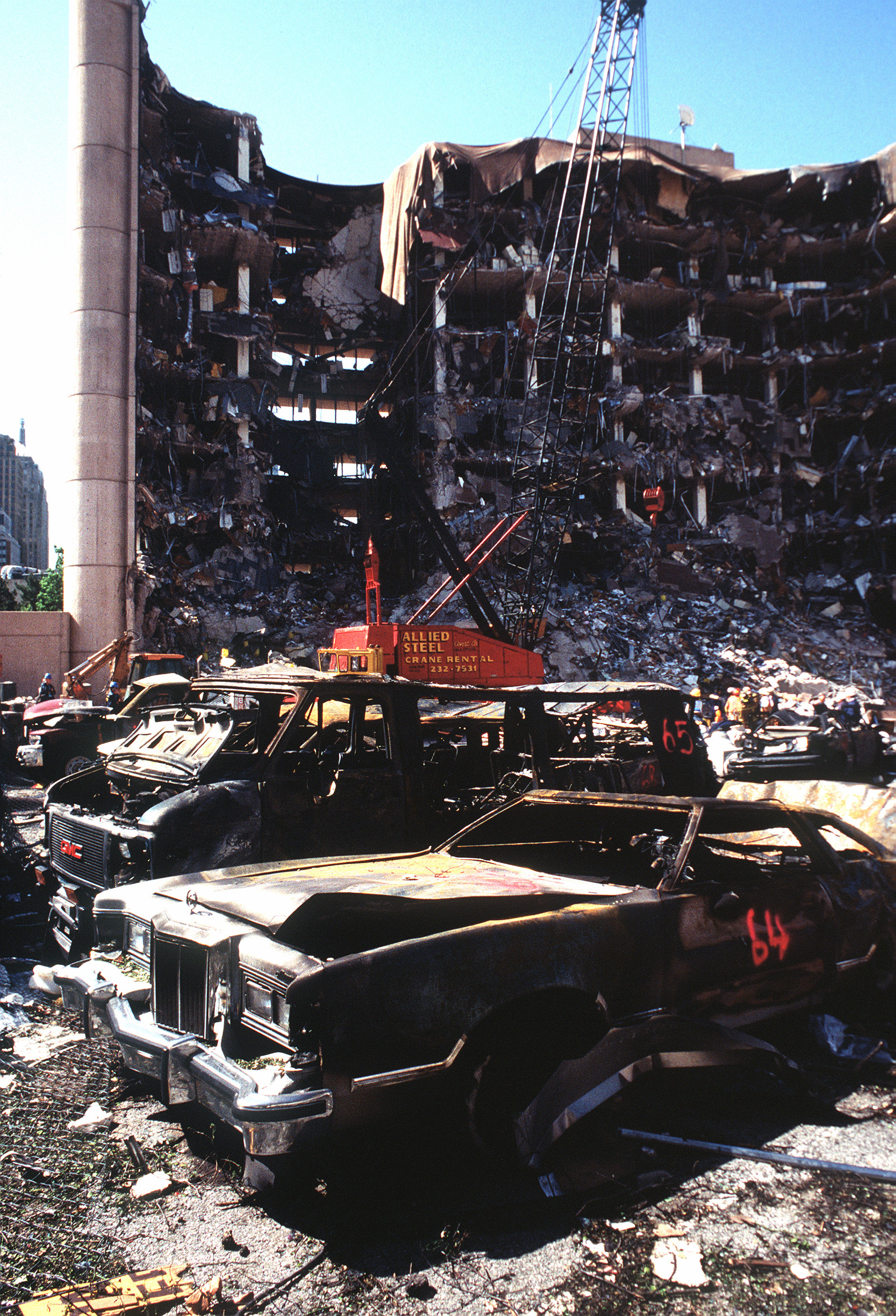
The federal building that was bombed in the Oklahoma City bombing two days after the bombing, viewed from across the adjacent parking lot.

- The 1993 World Trade Center bombing in the United States (1993) led to broader public awareness in the US of domestic terrorism and international terrorism as a potential threat.
- Markale market massacres in Bosnia and Herzegovina (1994) – soldiers of the Army of Republika Srpska deliberately targeted Bosniak (then known as "Bosnian Muslims") civilians.
- AMIA bombing (1994) – on 18 July 1994, an unknown terrorist targeting Argentina's Jewish community planted a car bomb in the Asociación Mutual Israelita Argentina headquarters in Buenos Aires, killing 85 people and injuring hundreds, making it the first ethnically targeted bombing and deadliest bombing in Argentine history.
- Rwandan Genocide (April 11th - July 1994) Backed by the Hutu-led government, extremist Hutu militias systematically slaughtered an estimated 800,000 to 1 million ethnic Tutsis and moderate Hutus over a 100-day period. The deep-rooted animosity was heavily exacerbated by remnants of colonial racial classification. It was one of the worst genocides in history.
- Srebrenica genocide in Bosnia and Herzegovina (1995) – soldiers of the Army of Republika Srpska and members of Serbia's Scorpions paramilitary group committed mass murder of Bosniak civilians.
- Oklahoma City bombing (1995) in the United States – the bombing of a federal building in Oklahoma City, Oklahoma killed 168 people, becoming the deadliest terrorist attack in the United States at that time. Suspect Timothy McVeigh claimed he bombed the building in retaliation for the 1992 Ruby Ridge standoff and the Waco siege a year later.
- The 1996 Manchester bombing (1996) – on 15 June 1996, the IRA set off a bomb in Manchester, England. The bomb, placed in a van on Corporation Street in the city center, targeted the city's infrastructure and economy and caused widespread damage, estimated by insurers at £700 million (£1 billion as of 2011). Two hundred and twelve people were injured, but there were no fatalities.
- The 1998 United States embassy bombings – Al-Qaeda militants carried out bomb attacks on United States embassies in Kenya and Tanzania. In retaliation, U.S. naval military forces launched cruise missile attacks against Al-Qaeda bases in Afghanistan.
- The Omagh bombing in Northern Ireland (1998) – a bombing in Omagh, County Tyrone, that killed 29 civilians and injured hundreds more.
- LAX bombing plot (1999) – Ahmed Ressam, an Islamist militant associated with Al-Qaeda, was arrested when attempting to cross from Canada into the United States at the Canada-U.S. border on 14 December 1999. It was later discovered that he intended to bomb Los Angeles International Airport (LAX) during millennium celebrations. This was the first major attempted terrorist attack by Al-Qaeda on United States soil since the 1993 World Trade Center bombing and marked the beginning of a series of attempted terrorist attacks by Al-Qaeda against the United States that would continue into the 21st century.

=== Decolonization and independence ===
- Independence of Namibia (1990) – the Republic of Namibia gained independence from South Africa on 21 March 1990. Walvis Bay, initially retained by South Africa, joined Namibia in 1994.
- Breakup of Yugoslavia (1991–1992) – the republics of Croatia, Slovenia, Bosnia and Herzegovina, and Macedonia declared independence from Yugoslavia.
- Independence of Eritrea (1993) – Eritrea gained independence from Ethiopia.
- Dissolution of Czechoslovakia (1993) – the Slovak Republic adopts the Declaration of Independence from the Czech and Slovak Federative Republic (Czechoslovakia).
- Independence of Palau (1994) – Palau gained independence from the United Nations Trusteeship Council.
- Handover of Hong Kong (1997) – The United Kingdom handed sovereignty of Hong Kong (then British Hong Kong) to the People's Republic of China on 1 July 1997.
- Independence of East Timorese (1999) – East Timor broke away from Indonesian occupation, only a year after the fall of Suharto from power, ending a 24-year guerrilla war and genocide with more than 200,000 casualties. The UN deployed a peacekeeping force spearheaded by Australia's armed forces. The United States deployed police officers to serve with the Interpol element to help train and equip an East Timorese police force.
- Handover of Macau (1999) – Portugal handed sovereignty of Macau (Portuguese Macau) to the People's Republic of China on 20 December 1999.
- Dissolution of the Soviet Union (1991) – multiple Soviet Socialist Republics (SSRs) declared independence from the USSR.
  - Armenia – the Armenian SSR became the Republic of Armenia following the Declaration of Independence of Armenia.
  - Azerbaijan – the Azerbaijan SSR became the Republic of Azerbaijan.
  - Belarus – the Byelorussian SSR became the Republic of Belarus following its Declaration of State Sovereignty.
  - Estonia – Estonian SSR became the Republic of Estonia.
  - Georgia – The Georgian SSR became the Republic of Georgia.
  - Kazakhstan – the Kazakh SSR became the Republic of Kazakhstan.
  - Kyrgyzstan – the Kirghiz SSR became the Republic of Kyrgyzstan.
  - Latvia – the Latvian SSR became the Republic of Latvia.
  - Lithuania – the Lithuanian SSR became the Republic of Lithuania
  - Moldova – the Moldavian SSR became the Republic of Moldova.
  - Tajikistan – the Tajik SSR became the Republic of Tajikistan.
  - Turkmenistan – the Turkmen SSR became the Republic of Turkmenistan.
  - Ukraine – the Ukrainian SSR became the Republic of Ukraine
  - Uzbekistan – the Uzbek SSR became the Republic of Uzbekistan.

=== Political trends ===
- The 1990s saw an increased spread of capitalism and third way policies. The former countries of the Warsaw Pact moved from single-party socialist states to multi-party states with private sector economies. The same wave of political liberalization occurred in the capitalist and newly industrialized countries (including First and Third World countries), such as Argentina, Brazil, Chile, India, Indonesia, Malaysia, Mexico, the Philippines, South Africa, South Korea, Taiwan, and Thailand. Market reforms made incredible changes to the economies of Second World socialist countries such as China and Vietnam.
- Ethnic tensions and violence in former Yugoslavia during the 1990s created a greater sense of ethnic identity among nations in newly independent countries and a marked increase in the popularity of nationalism.

=== Deaths ===
Prominent deaths of sitting leaders including:

- September 9, 1990: Samuel Doe, President of Liberia (1986–90) was assassinated.
- April 17, 1993: Turgut Ozal, President of Turkey (1988–93)
- December 12, 1993: Jozsef Antall, Prime Minister of Hungary (1990–93)
- July 8, 1994: Kim Il-Sung, General Secretary of the North Korean Worker's Party and President of North Korea (1948–94)
- November 4, 1995: Yitzak Rabin, Prime Minister of Israel (1974–77, 1992–95) was assassinated
- December 10, 1999: Franjo Tuđman, President of Croatia (1990–1999).

Prominent deaths of former leaders including:

- February 24, 1990: Sandro Pertini, President of Italy (1978–85)
- July 29, 1990: Bruno Kreisky, Chancellor of Austria (1970–83)
- May 21, 1991: Rajiv Gandhi, Prime Minister of India (1984–1989), was assassinated.
- March 9, 1992: Menachem Begin, Prime Minister of Israel (1977–83)
- October 8, 1992: Willy Brandt, Chancellor of West Germany (1969–74)
- November 7, 1992: Alexander Dubček, General Secretary of the Communist Party of Czechoslovakia (1968–69)
- May 1, 1993: Pierre Bérégovoy, Prime Minister of France (1991–93), committed suicide.
- April 22, 1994: Richard Nixon, 37th president of the United States (1969–74)
- April 29, 1994: Erich Honecker, General Secretary of the Communist Party of East Germany (1971–89)
- August 4, 1994: Giovanni Spadolini, Prime Minister of Italy (1981-82)
- May 24, 1995: Harold Wilson, Prime Minister of the United Kingdom (1964–70, 1974–76)
- October 9, 1995: Alec Douglas-Home, Prime Minister of the United Kingdom (1963–64)
- January 8, 1996: Francois Miterrand, President of France (1981–95)
- June 23, 1996: Andreas Papandreou, Prime Minister of Greece (1981–89, 1993–96)
- February 17, 1997: Deng Xiaoping, Paramount leader of People's Republic of China (1978–89)
- April 23, 1998: Konstantinos Karamanlis, Prime Minister of Greece (1955–58, 1958–61, 1961–63, 1974–80), President of Hellenic Republic (1980–85, 1990–95)
- August 5, 1998: Todor Zhivkov, General Secretary of the Bulgarian Communist Party (1954–89)
- November 20, 1999: Amintore Fanfani, Prime Minister of Italy (1954, 1958–59, 1960–63, 1982–83, 1987)

=== Prominent political events ===
==== Africa ====
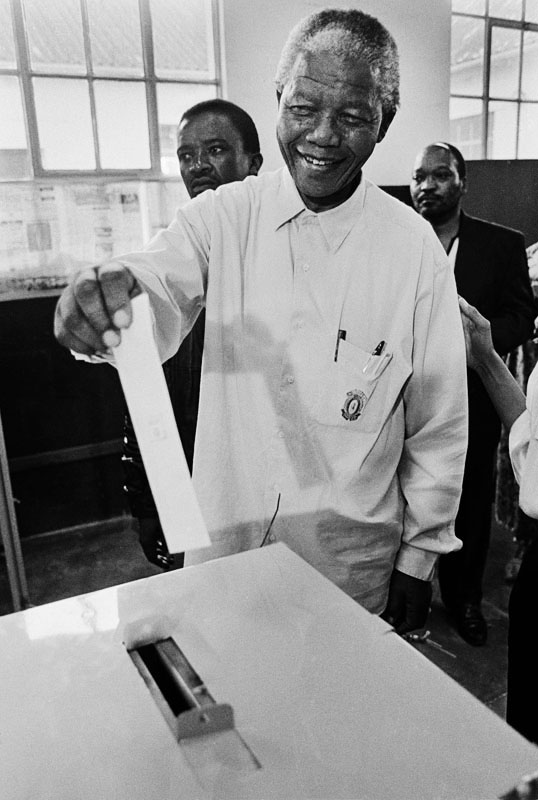
Nelson Mandela voting in 1994, after thirty years of imprisonment.

- African National Congress leader Nelson Mandela was released from prison on 11 February 1990, after thirty years of imprisonment for opposing apartheid and white-minority rule in South Africa. Apartheid ended in South Africa in 1994.
- Nelson Mandela was elected President of South Africa in 1994, becoming the first democratically elected president in South African history, and ending a long legacy of apartheid white rule in the country.

==== Americas ====
During the late 1990s, a move was made to remove American president Bill Clinton from power following the Clinton–Lewinsky scandal. This impeachment attempt did not succeed, and Clinton continued to serve as president until the end of his term in January 2001.

- The Argentine peso was pegged to the American dollar by the Convertibility plan by the government of Carlos Menem in an attempt to eliminate hyperinflation and stimulate economic growth. While it was initially met with considerable success, the board's actions ultimately failed. The Convertibility Plan went from 1991 to 2002.
- The establishment of the North American Free Trade Agreement (NAFTA) on 1 January 1994, created a North American free-trade zone consisting of Canada, Mexico, and the United States.
- The Constitution of Argentina went through an important reform in 1994, which introduced third generation rights, gave more relevance to international treaties, and also introduced new concepts such as Necessity and Urgency Decrees and the two-round system.
- Canadian politics was radically altered in the 1993 federal election with the collapse of the Progressive Conservative Party of Canada. A major political party in Canada since 1867, the party went from controlling the government to being left with only two seats. The New Democratic Party collapsed as well, with their sets declining from 44 to 9. The Liberal Party of Canada was the only genuinely 'national' political party left standing. Regionally based parties, such as the Quebec-based Bloc Québécois and the almost entirely Western Canada-based Reform Party of Canada, rose from political insignificance to being major political parties.
- After the collapse of the Meech Lake constitutional accord in 1990, the province of Quebec in Canada experienced a rekindled wave of separatism by Francophone Québécois nationalists, who sought for Quebec to become an independent country and forced a referendum on the question of independence in 1995.
  - The 1995 Quebec referendum on sovereignty was held in the predominantly francophone province of Quebec in Canada, a majority Anglophone country. If accepted, Quebec would have become an independent country with an economic association with Canada. Quebec's voters narrowly rejected the proposal.
- Jean-Bertrand Aristide, a former Haitian priest, became the first democratically elected President of Haiti in 1990. A proponent of liberation theology, Aristide was appointed to a Roman Catholic parish in Port-au-Prince in 1982 after completing his studies to become a priest of the Salesian order. Aristide was later forced into exile in the Central African Republic and South Africa and returned to Haiti after several years.
- Ernesto Zedillo was elected President of Mexico in the 1994 presidential election, making him the last of an uninterrupted 72-year-long succession of Mexican presidents from the dominant Institutional Revolutionary Party (PRI). The original PRI candidate, Luis Donaldo Colosio Murrieta, was assassinated several months prior.
- Due to internal conflict and an economic crisis, Alberto Fujimori rose to power in Peru and remained in office for eleven years. His administration was marked by economic development but also by numerous human rights violations (La Cantuta massacre, Barrios Altos massacre) and a rampant corruption network set up by Vladimiro Montesinos.
- The sluggish Latin American economies of Argentina, Brazil, Chile, and Mexico, by a new emphasis on free markets for all their citizens after the debt crisis of the 1980s. Following democratic reforms and neoliberal policies were implemented by President Carlos Saúl Menem (Argentina), President Eduardo Frei Ruiz-Tagle (Chile), President Ernesto Zedillo (Mexico), and President Fernando Henrique Cardoso (Brazil), in their best shape by the late 1990s.
- United States President Bill Clinton was a dominant political figure in international affairs during the 1990s, known primarily for his attempts to negotiate peace in the Middle East and end the ongoing wars occurring in the former Yugoslavia, his promotion of international action to decrease human-created climate change, and his endorsement of advancing free trade in the Americas.
- After a failed coup attempt in 1992, Hugo Chávez, politician and former member of the Venezuelan military, is elected President of Venezuela in 1998.
- Lewinsky scandal – US president Bill Clinton was caught in a media-frenzied scandal involving inappropriate relations with White House intern Monica Lewinsky, which was first announced on 21 January 1998. After the United States House of Representatives impeached Bill Clinton on 19 December 1998, for perjury under oath, and following an investigation by federal prosecutor Kenneth Starr, the Senate acquitted Clinton of all charges on 12 February 1999. He served out the remainder of his second term.
- California voters passed Proposition 215 in 1996, which legalized cannabis for medicinal purposes.

==== Asia ====
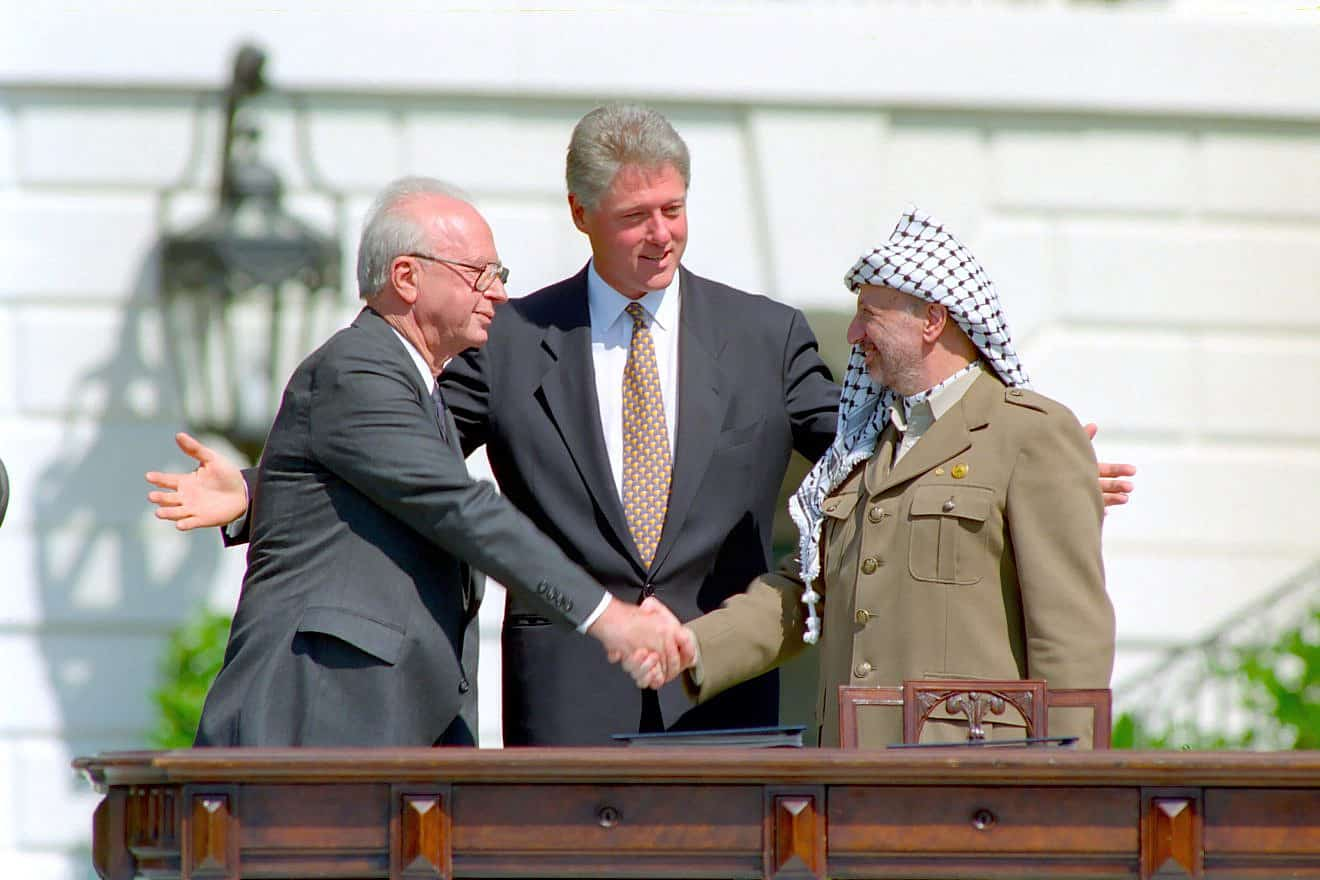
Israeli Prime Minister Yitzhak Rabin, United States President Bill Clinton, and Palestine Liberation Organization (PLO) Chairman Yasser Arafat during the signing of the Oslo Accords on 13 September 1993.

- In 1990, the Lebanese Civil War came to a close and a return to political normalcy in Lebanon began. With peace among all factions in Lebanon, the rebuilding of the country and its capital, Beirut, began.
- 1990 Nepalese revolution, a multiparty movement against the one-party Panchayat rule in Nepal. It led to the end of absolute monarchy in Nepal and the restoration of democracy.
- Israeli Prime Minister Yitzhak Rabin and Palestinian Prime Minister Yasser Arafat agree to the Israeli–Palestinian peace process at the culmination of the Oslo Accords, negotiated by the United States president, Bill Clinton, on 13 September 1993.
  - By signing the Oslo accords, the Palestine Liberation Organization recognized Israel's right to exist. At the same time, Israel permitted the creation of an autonomous Palestinian National Authority consisting of the Gaza Strip and West Bank, which was implemented in 1994.
  - Israeli military forces withdrew from these Palestinian territories in compliance with the accord, which marked the end of the First Intifada (a period of violence between Palestinian Arab militants and Israeli armed forces from 1987 to 1993).
  - The Palestinian National Authority was created in 1994 following the Oslo Accords, giving Palestinian Arab people official autonomy over the Gaza Strip and West Bank, though not official independence from Israel.
- On 4 November 1995, Israeli prime minister Yitzhak Rabin was assassinated by a right-wing extremist who opposed the signing of the Oslo Accords.
- North Yemen and South Yemen merged to form Yemen in 1990.
- Lee Kuan Yew resigned as the prime minister of Singapore on 28 November 1990, a position he had held since 1959, to Goh Chok Tong. Lee remained in the cabinet as Senior Minister.
- In July 1994, North Korean leader Kim Il Sung died, having ruled the country since its founding in 1948. His son Kim Jong Il, who succeeded him, took over a nation on the brink of complete economic collapse. Famine had caused a significant number of deaths in the late 1990s, and North Korea gained a reputation for being an important hub of money laundering, counterfeiting, and weapons proliferation. The country's ability to produce and sell nuclear weapons became a prominent concern in the international community.
- In 1990, Aung San Suu Kyi's National League for Democracy in Burma won a majority of seats in the first free election conducted in 30 years. But the SPDC refused to relinquish power, beginning a peaceful struggle that began in the 1990s and continued for several decades, primarily fueled by Aung San Suu Kyi and her supporters to demand the end of military rule.
- Indonesian president Suharto resigned after ruling the country for 32 years (1966–1998), following the riots on several cities in Indonesia. His resignation marked the beginning of the Reform era.
- In India, the former prime minister Rajiv Gandhi was assassinated on 21 May 1991 by the Tamil Tigers, beginning a period of economic liberalization led by new prime minister P. V. Narasimha Rao.
- After democratic reforms and steady economic growth in the four Asia-Pacific MNNAs by the United States and Canada, after the Revolutions of 1989.
  - In the Philippines, following the People Power Revolution of 1986 under the Corazon Aquino presidency until 1992, democratic reforms and economic policies implemented by two Presidents were elected by Fidel V. Ramos in 1992, and Joseph Estrada in 1998.
  - South Korea and Taiwan became developed countries, and two of the Four Asian Tigers in the 1990s. Following democratic reforms in 1988, neoliberal policies were implemented by President Kim Young-sam (South Korea) and President Lee Teng-hui (Taiwan), both who led their countries during the 1997 Asian financial crisis.
  - Japan saw eight different prime ministers serve during the 1990s in what was at first called the "Lost Decade" but later became referred to as the "Lost Decades of the Heisei Era". These included Morihiro Hosokawa, who won the 1993 Japanese general election and formed an opposition coalition until 1996.

==== Europe ====
- The improvement in relations between NATO countries and the former members of the Warsaw Pact led to the end of the Cold War, both in Europe and other parts of the world.
- German reunification – on 3 October 1990, East and West Germany reunified as a result of the collapse of the Soviet Union and the fall of the Berlin Wall. After reintegrating their economic structure and provincial governments, Germany focused on the modernization of the formerly communist East. People brought up in socialist East Germany became integrated with those living in capitalist West Germany.
- Margaret Thatcher, who had been the United Kingdom's prime minister since 1979, resigned as prime minister on 22 November 1990 after being challenged for leadership of the Conservative Party by Michael Heseltine. This was because of widespread opposition to the introduction of the controversial Community Charge, and the fact that her key allies such as Nigel Lawson and Geoffrey Howe resigned over the deeply sensitive issues of the Maastricht Treaty and Thatcher's resistance to Britain joining the European Exchange Rate Mechanism. Less than two years later, on the infamous Black Wednesday of September 1992, the pound sterling crashed out of the system after the pound fell below the agreed exchange rate with the Deutsche Mark.
  - John Major replaced Thatcher as prime minister in 1990.
- The Perestroika (restructuring) of the Soviet Union destabilized, leading to nationalist and separatist demagogues gaining popularity. Boris Yeltsin, then chairman of the Supreme Soviet of Russia, resigned from the Communist Party and became the opposition leader against Mikhail Gorbachev. The Communist Party lost its status as the governing force of the country and was banned after a coup attempt by communist hardliners attempted to revert the effects of Gorbachev's policies. Yeltsin's counter-revolution was victorious, and on 25 December 1991, Gorbachev resigned from the presidency, which led to the dissolution of the Soviet Union. Yeltsin became president of the Soviet Union's successor, the Russian Federation, and presided over a period of political unrest, economic crisis, and social anarchy. On 31 December 1999, Yeltsin resigned, leaving Vladimir Putin as acting president.
- The European Union was formed in 1992 under the Maastricht Treaty.
- The Downing Street Declaration, signed on 15 December 1993 by the prime minister of the United Kingdom, John Major, and the Taoiseach of Ireland, Albert Reynolds at the British prime minister's office in 10 Downing Street, affirmed that (1) the right of the people of Ireland to self-determination, and (2) that Northern Ireland would be transferred to the Republic of Ireland from the United Kingdom only if a majority of its population was in favour of such a move. It included, as part of the perspective of the so-called "Irish dimension," the principle of consent that the people of the island of Ireland had the exclusive right to solve the issues between North and South by mutual consent. The latter statement, which later would become one of the points of the Good Friday Agreement, was key to producing a positive change of attitude by the Republicans towards a negotiated settlement. The joint declaration also pledged the governments to seek a peaceful constitutional settlement and promised that parties linked with paramilitaries (such as Sinn Féin) could take part in the talks so long as they abandoned violence.
- The IRA agreed to a truce in 1994. This marked the beginning of the end of 25 years of violence between the IRA and the United Kingdom and the start of political negotiations.
- Tony Blair became prime minister in 1997 following a general election.
- The Belfast Agreement (a.k.a. the Good Friday Agreement) was signed by the U.K. and Irish politicians on 10 April 1998, declaring a joint commitment to a peaceful resolution of the territorial dispute between Ireland and the United Kingdom over Northern Ireland. The 1998 Northern Ireland Good Friday Agreement referendum was held on 22 May 1998, with majority approval.
- The National Assembly for Wales was established following the 1997 Welsh devolution referendum, in which a majority of voters approved the creation of the National Assembly for Wales.
- In September 1997, the 1997 Scottish devolution referendum was put to the Scottish electorate and secured a majority in favor of the establishment of a new Scottish Parliament.

== Assassinations and attempts ==
Prominent assassinations, targeted killings, and assassination attempts include:

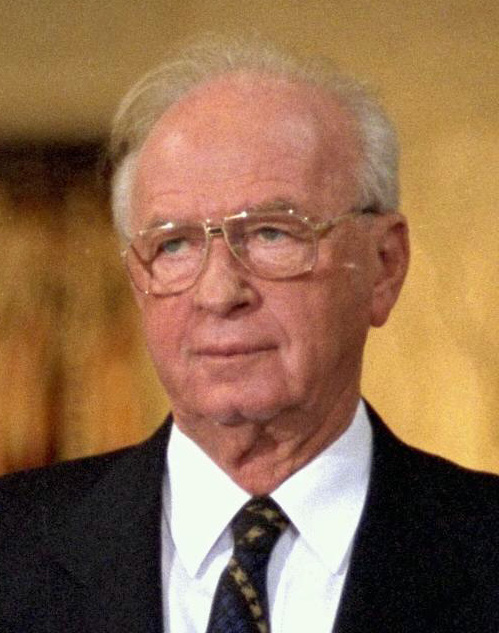
Yitzhak Rabin

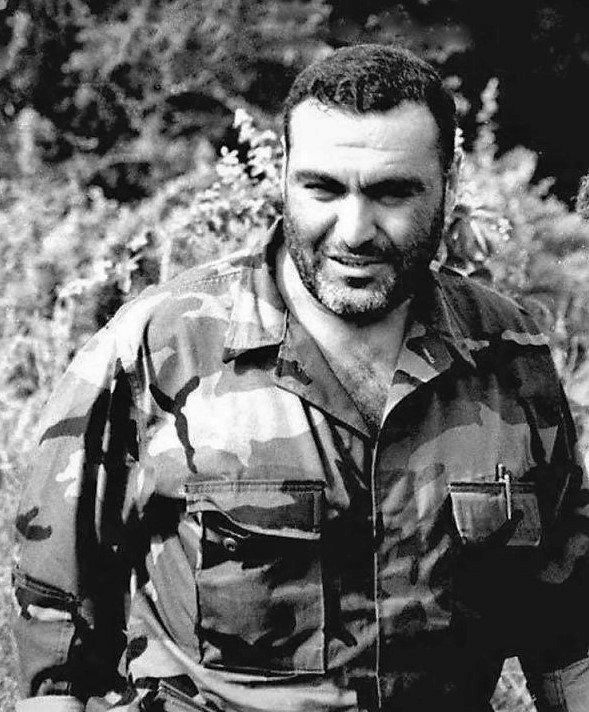
Vazgen Sargsyan

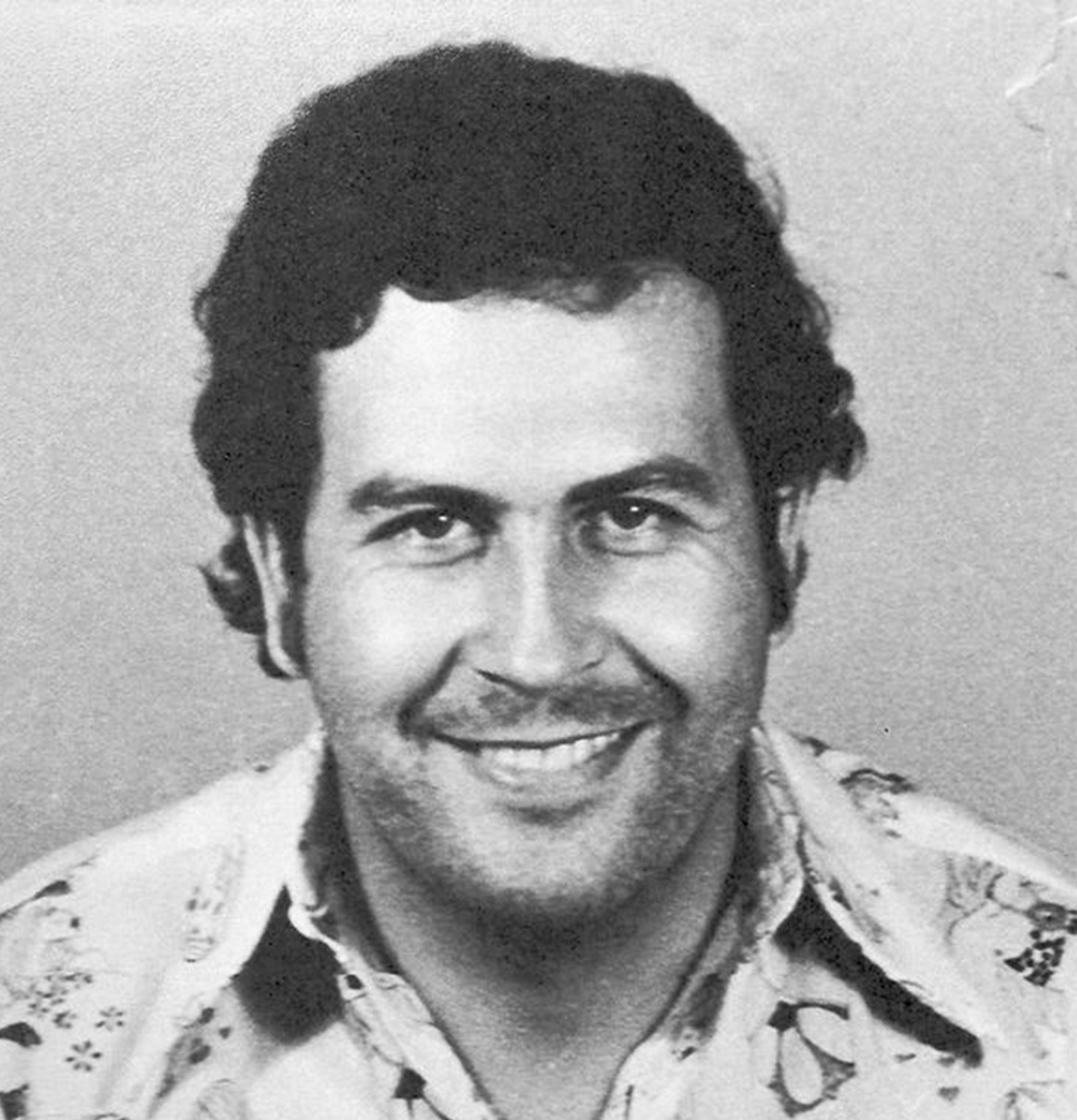
Pablo Escobar

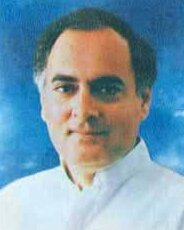
Rajiv Gandhi

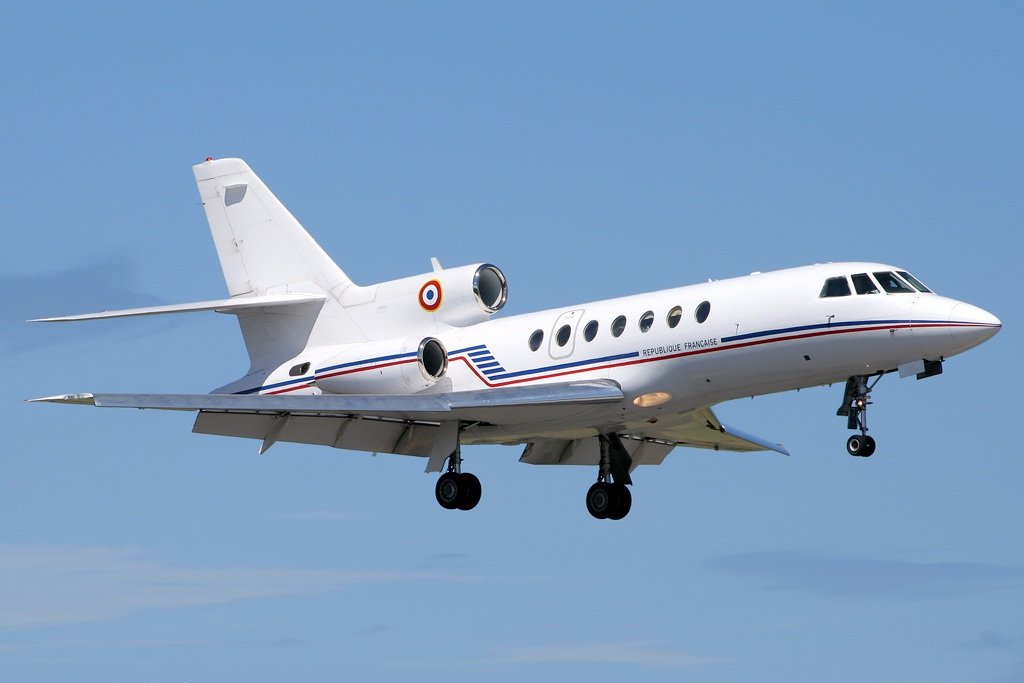
A Dassault Falcon 50 similar to the one shot down in the assassination of Juvénal Habyarimana and Cyprien Ntaryamira

Date	Description
9 September 1990	Samuel Doe, 21st president of Liberia, was captured by rebels, tortured and murdered. His torture was controversially videotaped and seen on news reports around the world.
21 May 1991	Rajiv Gandhi, former prime minister of India, is assassinated in Sriperumbudur.
7 August 1991	Shapour Bakhtiar, former prime minister of Iran, is assassinated by Islamic Republic agents.
29 June 1992	Mohamed Boudiaf, President of Algeria, is assassinated by a bodyguard.
13 April 1993	George H. W. Bush, former president of the United States, is alleged to be the target of an assassination by Iraq per a report from the Kuwaiti government during a visit to the country.
1 May 1993	Ranasinghe Premadasa, 3rd president of Sri Lanka, is killed by a suicide bombing.
21 October 1993	Melchior Ndadaye, 4th president of Burundi, is killed during an attempted military coup.
2 December 1993	Pablo Escobar, leader of the Medellín drug cartel, is killed by special operations units of the National Police of Colombia.
23 March 1994	Luis Donaldo Colosio Murrieta, the Institutional Revolutionary Party candidate in the 1994 Mexican general election, was assassinated at a campaign rally in Tijuana.
6 April 1994	Juvénal Habyarimana, 2nd president of Rwanda, and Cyprien Ntaryamira, 5th president of Burundi, are both killed when their jet is shot down in what is considered the prelude to the Rwandan genocide and the First Congo War.
4 November 1995	Yitzhak Rabin, 5th prime minister of Israel, is assassinated at a rally in Tel Aviv by a radical ultranationalist who opposed the Oslo Accords.
21 April 1996	Dzhokhar Dudayev, 1st president of Chechnya, is killed by two laser-guided missiles after his location was detected by a Russian reconnaissance aircraft.
2 October 1996	Andrey Lukanov, former prime minister of Bulgaria, is shot outside his apartment in Sofia.
23 March 1999	Luis María Argaña, Vice President of Paraguay, is assassinated by gunmen outside his home.
9 April 1999	Ibrahim Baré Maïnassara, 5th president of Niger, is assassinated by members of his protective staff in Niamey.
27 October 1999	Vazgen Sargsyan, Prime Minister of Armenia, Karen Demirchyan, President of the National Assembly and six other politicians were assassinated in Armenian Parlament.

== Disasters ==
=== Natural disasters ===
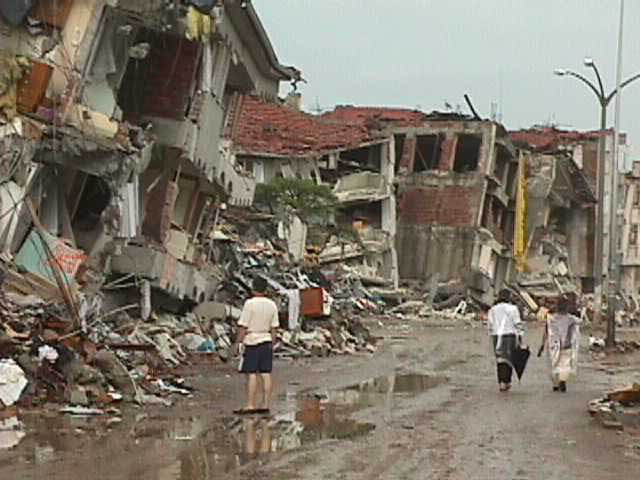
The 1999 İzmit earthquake, which occurred in northwestern Turkey, killed 17,217 and injured 43,959.

The 1990s saw a trend in frequent and more devastating natural disasters, breaking many previous records. Although the 1990s was designated by the United Nations as an International Decade for Natural Disaster Reduction as part of its program to prevent losses due to disasters, disasters would go on to cause a record-breaking US$608 billion worth of damage—more than the past four decades combined.

- The most prominent natural disasters of the decade include: the 1991 Bangladesh cyclone (138,866 fatalities), Hurricane Andrew striking South Florida in August 1992, the crippling super storm of March 1993 along the Eastern Seaboard, the devastating 1994 Northridge earthquake in Los Angeles, the Great Hanshin earthquake in Kobe, Japan in January 1995, the Blizzard of 1996 in the eastern United States, the US drought of 1999, the deadly Hurricane Mitch which struck Central America in October 1998, the destructive Oklahoma tornado outbreak in May 1999, the August 1999 İzmit earthquake in Turkey, and the September 1999 Chi-Chi earthquake in Taiwan.
- A magnitude 7.8 earthquake hit the Philippines on 16 July 1990 and killed around 1000 people in Baguio.
- After 600 years of inactivity, Mount Pinatubo in the Philippines erupted and devastated Zambales and Pampanga in June 1991.
- July 1995 – Midwestern United States heat wave – An unprecedented heat wave strikes the Midwestern United States for most of the month. Temperatures peak at 106 °F (41 °C), and remain above 94 °F (34 °C) in the afternoon for 5 straight days. At least 739 people died in Chicago alone.

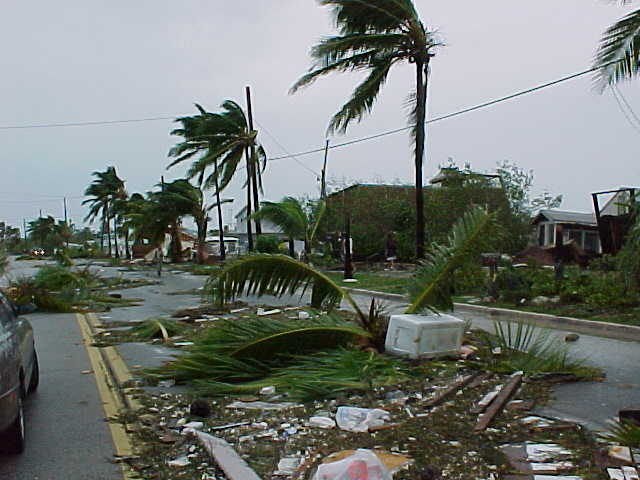
Hurricane Georges downed trees in Key West along the old houseboat row on South Roosevelt Blvd.

- Hurricane Georges made landfall in at least seven different countries (Antigua and Barbuda, St. Kitts and Nevis, Haiti, the Dominican Republic, Cuba, the United States and Puerto Rico, a Commonwealth of the United States) – more than any other hurricane since Hurricane Inez of the 1966 season. The total estimated costs were $60 billion (about $110 billion in 2022).
- September 1996 – Hurricane Fran made landfall in North Carolina, causing significant damage throughout the entire state.
- Hurricane Iniki hit the island of Kauai in the Hawaiian Islands on 11 September 1992, making it one of the costliest hurricanes on record in the eastern Pacific.
- A flood hits the Red River Valley in 1997 becoming the most severe flood since 1826.
- On May 3, 1999, the highest wind speeds recorded on Earth at 321 miles per hour (517 km/h) took place during the 1999 Bridge Creek–Moore tornado outbreak. The estimated costs were $1 billion (about $1.8 billion in 2024). This event was the first issued tornado emergency by the National Weather Service in history.
- In December 1999, torrential rains and flash floods killed tens of thousands of Venezuelans living in the state of Vargas in a natural disaster known as the Vargas tragedy.

=== Non-natural disasters ===
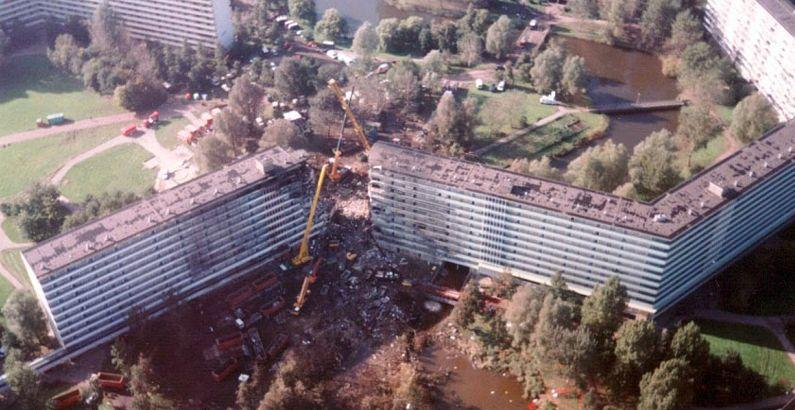
The crash site of El Al Flight 1862 in 1992.

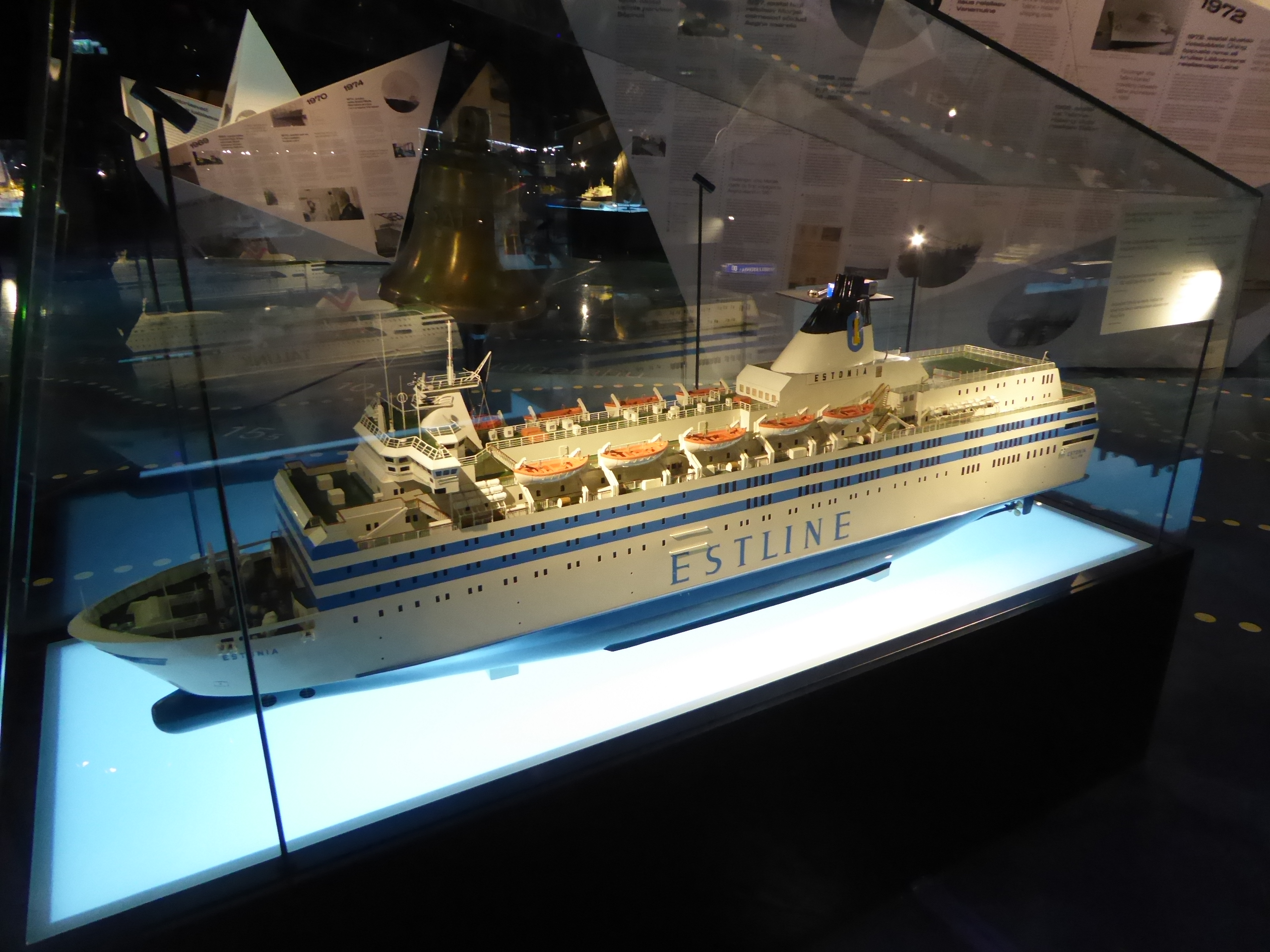
Miniature model from MS Estonia

- Gulf War oil spill: Resulting from actions taken during the Gulf War in 1991 by the Iraq military, the oil spill caused considerable damage to wildlife in the Persian Gulf, especially in areas surrounding Kuwait and Iraq.
- 11 July 1991: A Nationair Douglas DC-8, chartered by Nigeria Airways, caught fire and crashed in Jeddah, Saudi Arabia, killing 261 people.
- 15 December 1991: The Egyptian ferry Salem Express sinks in the Red Sea, killing more than 450 people.
- 4 October 1992: El Al Flight 1862, a Boeing 747 cargo airplane heading to Tel Aviv, suffered physical engine separation of both right-wing engines (#3 and #4) just after taking off from Schiphol and crashed into an apartment building in the Bijlmer neighbourhood of Amsterdam while attempting to return to the airport. A total of 43 people were killed, including the plane's crew of three and a "non-revenue passenger." Several others were injured.
- 26 July 1993: Asiana Airlines Flight 733 crashed into Mt. Ungeo in Haenam, South Korea, killing 68 people.
- 26 April 1994: China Airlines Flight 140, an Airbus A300, crashed just as it was about to land at Nagoya Airfield, Japan, killing 264 and leaving only seven survivors.
- 8 September 1994: USAir Flight 427 crashed near Pittsburgh, Pennsylvania, killing 132 people.
- 28 September 1994: The car ferry MS Estonia sinks in the Baltic Sea, killing 852 people.
- 29 June 1995: The Sampoong Department Store collapses in Seoul, South Korea, killing 502 people.
- 20 December 1995: American Airlines Flight 965, a Boeing 757, hit a mountain in Colombia at night, killing 159 people.
- 6 February 1996: Birgenair Flight 301, a Boeing 757, crashes shortly after takeoff from Puerto Plata, Dominican Republic, killing 189 people.
- 11 May 1996: ValuJet Flight 592, a DC-9, crashes into the Everglades shortly after takeoff from Miami, killing 110 people.
- 17 July 1996: Trans World Airlines Flight 800, a Boeing 747-131 exploded and crashed into the Atlantic Ocean near East Moriches, New York, killing 230 people.
- 12 November 1996: A Saudia Boeing 747 and a Kazakhstan Airlines Ilyushin Il-76 collided over the town of Charkhi Dadri, outside New Delhi, India, killing 349.
- 6 August 1997: Korean Air Flight 801, a Boeing 747-300, crashed into a hill on the island of Guam, killing 228 people.
- 26 September 1997: Garuda Indonesia Flight 152 crashed in bad weather, killing 234.
- 2 September 1998: Swissair Flight 111, a McDonnell Douglas MD-11, crashed into the Atlantic Ocean off Nova Scotia near the towns of Peggy's Cove and Bayswater, killing 229.
- 31 October 1999: EgyptAir Flight 990, a Boeing 767, crashed off the coast of Nantucket, Massachusetts, killing 217.

== Economics ==
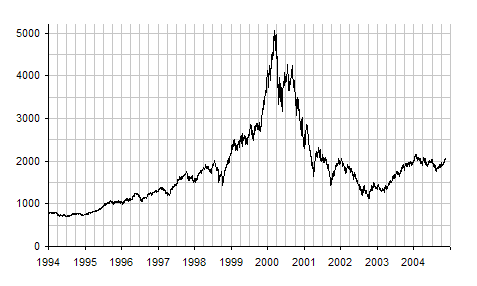
The Nasdaq Composite displaying the dot-com bubble, which ballooned between 1997 and 2000. The bubble peaked on Friday, 10 March 2000.

Many countries, institutions, companies, and organizations were prosperous during the 1990s. High-income countries such as the United States, Canada, Australia, New Zealand, Japan, Singapore, Hong Kong, Taiwan, South Korea, and Western Europe experienced steady economic growth for much of the decade during the Great Moderation. However, in the former Soviet Union, GDP decreased as their economies restructured to produce goods they needed, and some capital flight occurred.

- In 1993, the General Agreement on Tariffs and Trade (GATT) was updated to include the creation of the World Trade Organization, with the 76 existing GATT members and European Communities becoming the founding members of the World Trade Organization on 1 January 1995. Opposition by anti-globalization activists showed up in nearly every GATT summit, like the demonstrations in Seattle in December 1999.
  - The anti-globalization protests in the World Trade Organization Ministerial Conference of 1999 in Seattle began on 30 November 1999. This marked the beginning of a steady increase in anti-globalization protests in the first decade of the 21st century and increasing hostility to neoliberalism.
- U.S. inflation moderated, beginning in 1990 at 5.39%, falling to a low of 1.55% in 1998 and rising slightly to 2.19% in 1999.
- The G20 or Group of Twenty formed on 26 September 1999.

North America

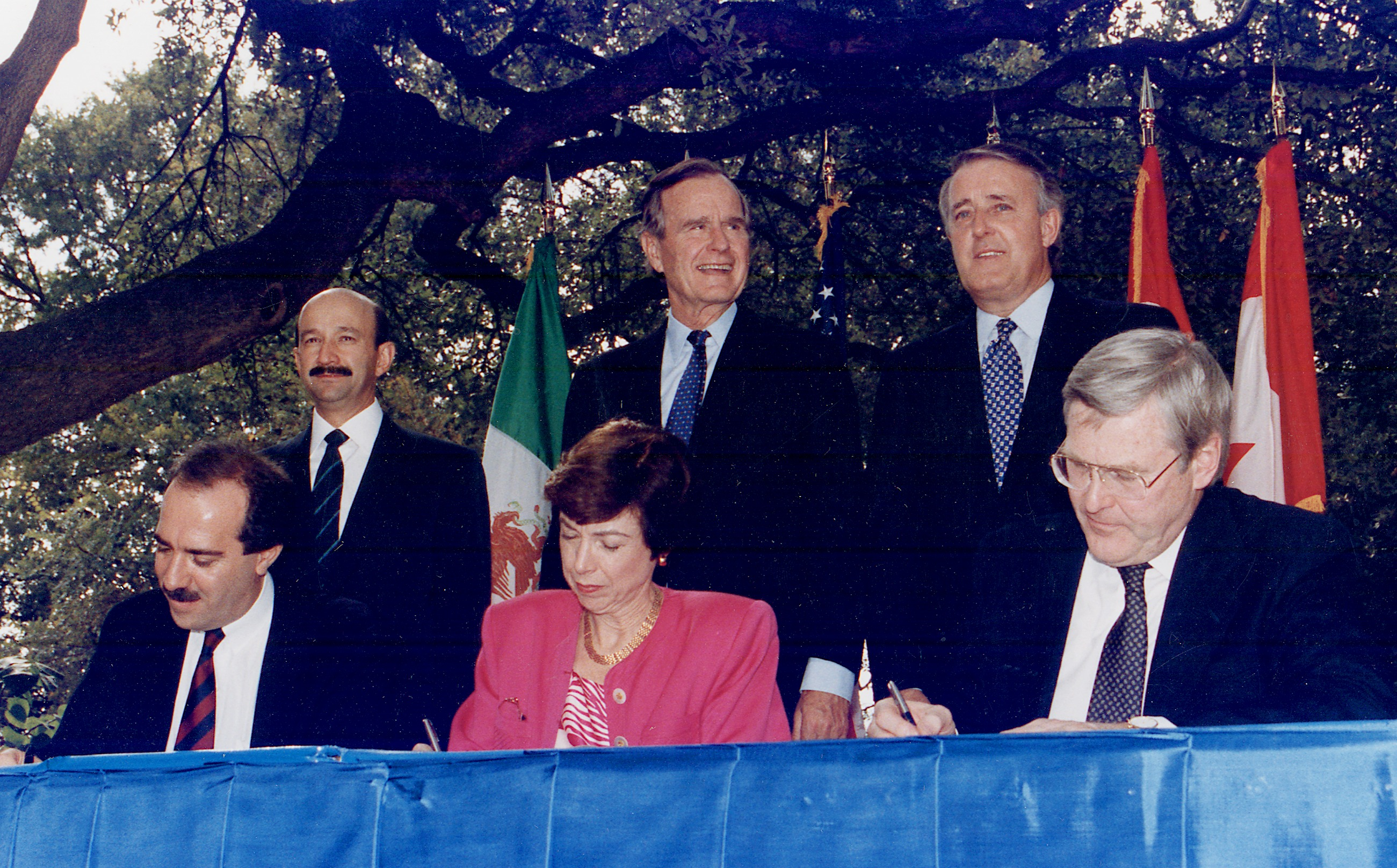
US, Canadian, and Mexican dignitaries initialing the draft North American Free Trade Agreement in October 1992

The Dow Jones Index of the 1990s

- The decade is seen as a time of great prosperity in the United States and Canada, largely because of the unexpected advent of the Internet and the explosion of technology industries. The US and Canadian economies experienced their longest period of peacetime economic expansion, beginning in 1991. Personal incomes doubled from the recession in 1990, and there was higher productivity overall. The New York Stock Exchange stayed over the 10,500 mark from 1999 to 2001.
- After the 1992 boom of the US stock market, Alan Greenspan coined the phrase "irrational exuberance", a reference to the overenthusiasm of investors that typified the trading of this period, and warned of overvaluation of assets and the stock market generally.
- The North American Free Trade Agreement (NAFTA), which phases out the trade barriers between the United States, Mexico, and Canada, was signed into law by President Bill Clinton.

Asia

- In the People's Republic of China, the government announced the major privatization of state-owned industries in September 1997. China entered the 1990s in a turbulent period due to the aftermath of both the Tiananmen Square Massacre and hardline politicians' efforts to rein in private enterprise and attempt to revive old-fashioned propaganda campaigns. Relations with the United States deteriorated sharply, and the Chinese leadership was further embarrassed by the disintegration of communism in Europe. In 1992 Deng Xiaoping travelled to southern China in his last major public appearance to revitalize faith in market economics and stop the country's slide back into Maoism. Afterward, China recovered and would experience explosive economic growth during the rest of the decade. Despite this, dissent continued to be suppressed, and Communist Party General Secretary Jiang Zemin launched a brutal crackdown against the Falun Gong religious sect in 1999. Deng Xiaoping died in 1997 at the age of 93. Relations with the US deteriorated again in 1999 after the bombing of the Chinese embassy during the bombing of Serbia by NATO forces, which caused three deaths, and allegations of Chinese espionage at the Los Alamos Nuclear Facility.
- Financial crisis hits East and Southeast Asian countries between 1997 and 1998 after a long period of phenomenal economic development, which continues into 1999. This crisis begins to be felt by the end of the decade.
- In Japan, after three decades of economic growth put them in second place in the world's economies, the county experienced an economic downturn after 1993. The recession went on into the early first decade of the 21st century, ending the seemingly unlimited prosperity that the country had previously enjoyed.
- Less affluent nations such as India, Malaysia, and Vietnam also saw tremendous improvements in economic prosperity and quality of life during the 1990s. Restructuring following the end of the Cold War was beginning. However, there was also the continuation of terrorism in Third World regions that were once the "frontlines" for American and Soviet foreign politics, particularly in Asia.

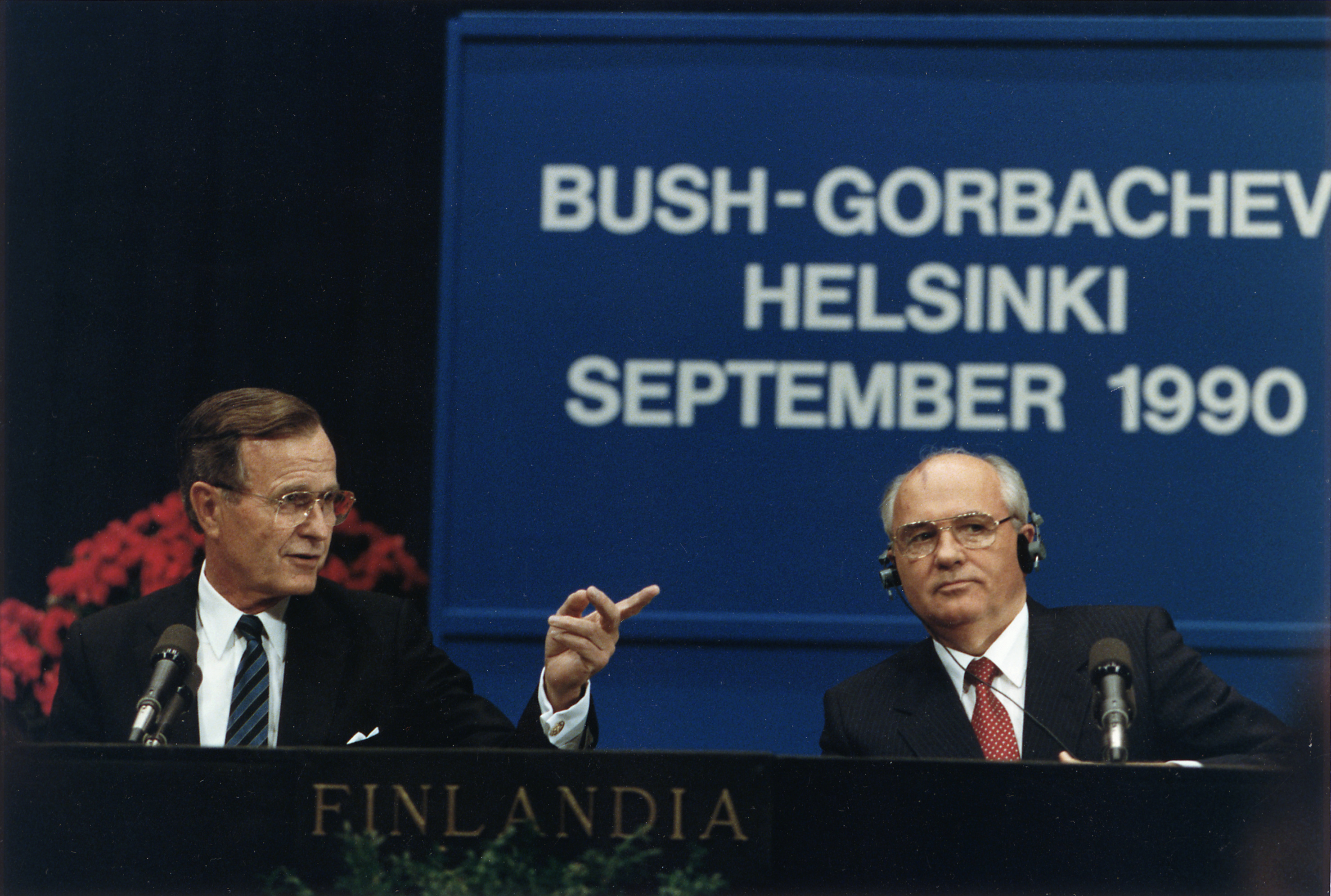
Bush and Gorbachev at the 1990 Helsinki summit.

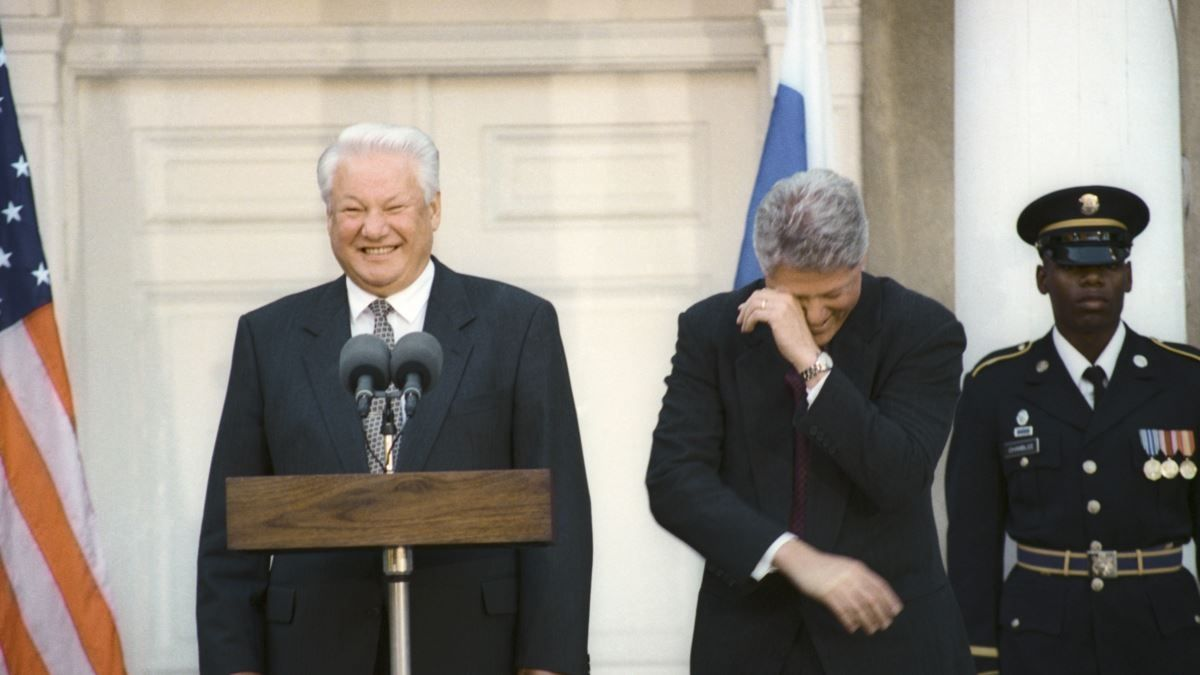
Boris Yeltsin and Bill Clinton share a laugh in October 1995.

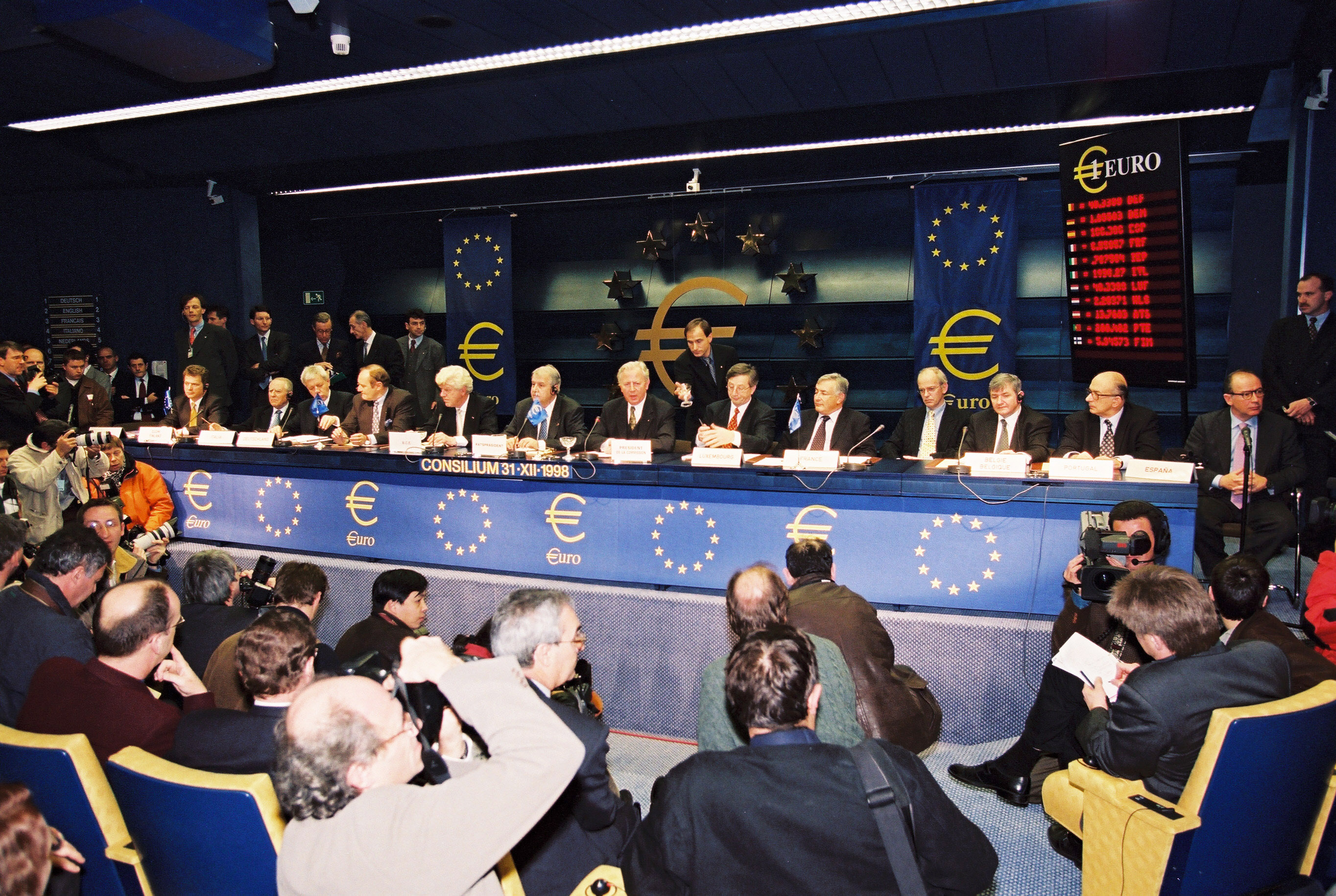
Press conference at the Council of the EU for the launching of the Euro in 1998

Europe

- By 1990, Soviet leader Mikhail Gorbachev's reforms were causing major inflation and economic chaos. A coup attempt by hardliners in August 1991 failed, marking the effective end of the Soviet Union. All its constituent republics declared their independence by 1991, and Gorbachev resigned from office on Christmas. After 73 years, the Soviet Union had ceased to exist. The new Russian Federation was headed by Boris Yeltsin, and would face severe economic difficulty. Oligarchs took over Russia's energy and industrial sectors, reducing almost half the country to poverty. With a 3% approval rating, Yeltsin had to buy the support of the oligarchs to win reelection in 1996. Economic turmoil and devaluation of the ruble continued, and with heart and alcohol troubles, Yeltsin stepped down from office on the last day of 1999, handing power to Vladimir Putin.
- Russian financial crisis in the 1990s resulted in mass hyperinflation and prompted economic intervention from the International Monetary Fund and western countries to help Russia's economy recover.
- The first McDonald's restaurant opened in Moscow in 1990 with then-President of the Supreme Soviet of the Russian SFSR and future Russian president Boris Yeltsin attending, symbolizing Russia's transition towards a capitalist free market economy and a move towards adopting elements of Western culture.
- Oil and gas were discovered in many countries in the former Soviet bloc, leading to economic growth and broader adoption of trade between nations. These trends were also fueled by inexpensive fossil energy, with low petroleum prices caused by increased oil production. Political stability and decreased militarization due to the winding down of the Cold War led to economic development and higher living standards for many citizens.
- Most of Europe enjoyed growing prosperity during the 1990s. However, problems including the massive 1995 general strikes in France following a recession and the difficulties associated with German reunification led to sluggish growth in these countries. However, the French and German economies improved in the latter half of the decade. Meanwhile, the economies of Spain, Scandinavia and former Eastern Bloc countries accelerated at rapid speed during the decade. Unemployment rates were low due to many having experienced a deep recession at the start of the decade.
- After the early 1990s recession, the United Kingdom and Ireland experienced rapid economic growth and falling unemployment that continued throughout the decade. Economic growth would continue until the Great Recession, marking the longest uninterrupted period of economic growth in history.
- Some Eastern European economies struggled after the fall of communism, but Poland, Hungary, Czech Republic, Estonia, Latvia and Lithuania saw economic growth in the late 1990s.
- With the creation of the European Union (EU), there is freedom of movement between member states, such as the 1992 and 1995 free trade agreements.
  - The Euro is adopted by the European Union on 1 January 1999, which begins a process of phasing out the former national currencies of EU countries.

South America

- A Latin American common market, Mercosur, was established in 1991. Mercosur's origins are linked to the discussions for the constitution of a regional economic market for Latin America, which go back to the treaty that established the Latin American Free Trade Association in 1960, which was succeeded by the Latin American Integration Association in the 1980s.

== Science and technology ==
=== Technology ===
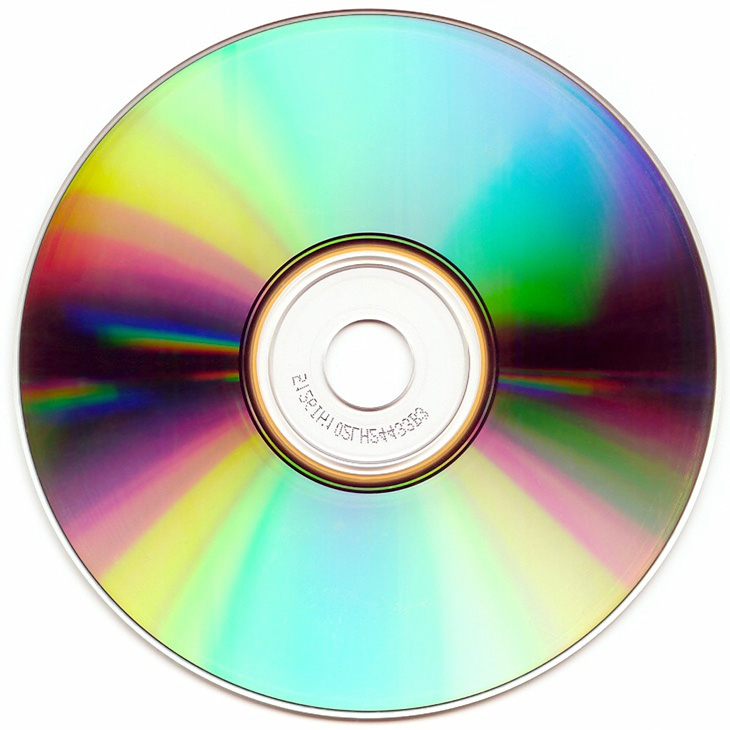
The compact disc reached its peak in popularity in the 1990s, and not once did another audio format surpass the CD in music sales from 1991 throughout the remainder of the decade. By 2000, the CD accounted for 92.3% of the entire market share in regard to music sales.

The 1990s were a revolutionary decade for digital technology. Between 1990 and 1997, household PC ownership in the US rose from 15% to 35%. Cell phones of the early-1990s and earlier ones were very large, lacked extra features, and were used by only a few percent of the population of even the advanced nations. Only a few million people used online services in 1990, and the World Wide Web, which would have a significant impact on technology for many decades, had only just been invented. The first web browser went online in 1993. By 2001, more than 50% of some Western countries had Internet access, and more than 25% had cell phone access.

==== Electronics and communications ====
On 6 August 1991, CERN, a pan-European organization for particle research, publicized the new World Wide Web project. Although the basic applications and guidelines that make the Internet possible had existed for almost two decades, the network did not gain a public face until the 1990s.

Tim Berners-Lee, an English computer scientist, released the World Wide Web to the general public on April 30, 1993. The same year, NCSA Mosaic, one of the first widely available web browsers, was launched as the first browser to display images in line with text and not in a separate window. In 1990, Archie, the first search engine, was released, initially as an index of File Transfer Protocol (FTP) sites.

Websites launched during the decade include IMDb (1993), Amazon (1994), GeoCities (1994), Netscape (1994), eBay (1995), Yahoo! (1995), AltaVista (1995), ICQ (1996), Hotmail (1996), AIM (1997), and Google (1998). The peer-to-peer (P2P) file sharing internet service Napster, which launched in Fall 1999, become popular as a way to share. MP3 files for music.

- Businesses start to build e-commerce websites; e-commerce-only companies such as Amazon.com, eBay, AOL, and Yahoo! grow rapidly.
- Driven by mass adoption, consumer personal computer specifications increased dramatically during the 1990s, from 512 KB RAM 12 MHz Turbo XTs in 1990, to 25–66 MHz 80486-class processor to over 1 GHz CPUs with close to a gigabyte of RAM by 2000.

The logo created by The President's Council on the Year 2000 Conversion, for use on Y2K.gov

- The Year 2000 problem (Y2K) spread fear throughout the United States and eventually the world in the last half of the decade, particularly in 1999, about possible massive computer malfunctions on 1 January 2000. As a result, many people stocked up on supplies for fear of a worldwide disaster. After significant effort to upgrade systems on the part of software engineers, no failures occurred when the clocks rolled over into 2000.
- The first Pentium microprocessor is introduced and developed by the Intel Corporation.
- Email becomes popular; as a result, Microsoft acquires the popular Hotmail webmail service.
- Instant messaging and the buddy list feature becomes popular. AIM and ICQ are two early protocols.
- The introduction of affordable, smaller satellite dishes and the DVB-S standard in the mid-1990s expanded satellite television services that carried up to 500 television channels.
- The first MP3 player, the MPMan, is released in the late spring of 1998. It came with 32 MB of flash memory expandable to 64 MB. By the mid-2000s, the MP3 player would overtake the CD player in popularity.
- The first GSM network is launched in Finland in 1991.
- Digital single-lens reflex cameras and regular digital cameras become commercially available. They would replace film cameras by the late 1990s and early 2000s.
- IBM introduces the 1-inch (25 mm) wide Microdrive hard drive in 170 MB and 340 MB capacities.
- Apple Computer in 1998 introduces the iMac all-in-one computer, initiating a trend in computer design towards translucent plastics and multicolour case design, discontinuing many legacy technologies like serial ports, and beginning a resurgence in the company's fortunes that continues to this day.
- CD burner drives are introduced.
- The CD-ROM drive became standard for most personal computers during the decade.
- The DVD media format is developed and popularized along with a plethora of Flash memory card standards in 1994.
- Pagers are initially popular but ultimately are replaced by mobile phones by the early-2000s.
- Hand-held satellite phones are introduced towards the end of the decade.
- The 24-hour news cycle becomes popular alongside the outbreak of the Gulf War between late 1990 and early 1991, and is solidified with CNN's coverage of Desert Storm and Desert Shield. Though CNN had been running 24-hour newscasts since 1980, it was not until the Gulf War that the general public took notice, and others imitated CNN's non-stop news approach.
- Portable CD players, introduced during the late 1980s, became very popular and profoundly impacted the music industry and youth culture during the 1990s.
- In 1992, Fujitsu introduced the world's first 21-inch (53 cm) full-color display plasma display television set.
A typical early 1990s personal computer.

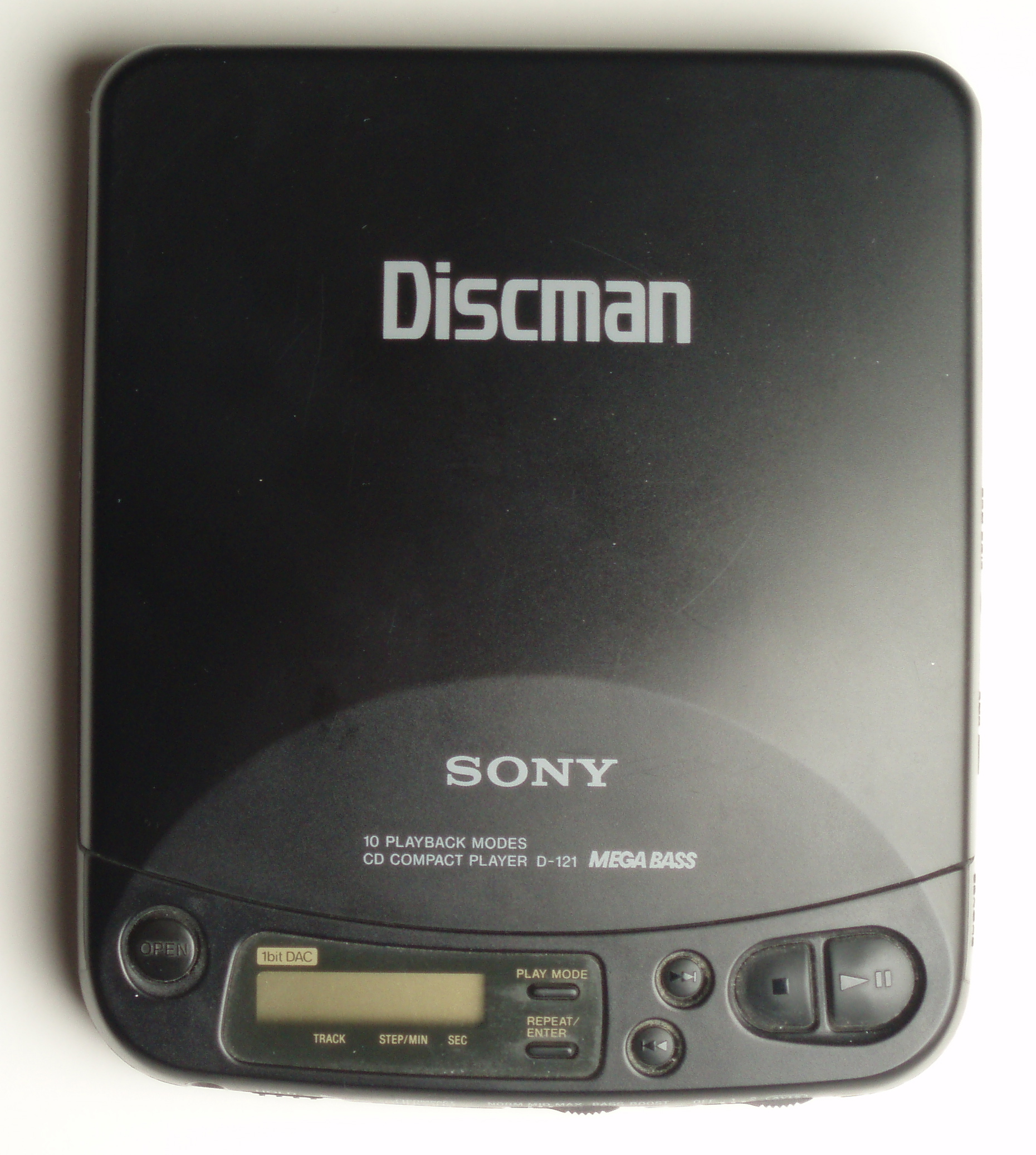
An early portable CD player, a Sony Discman model D121.

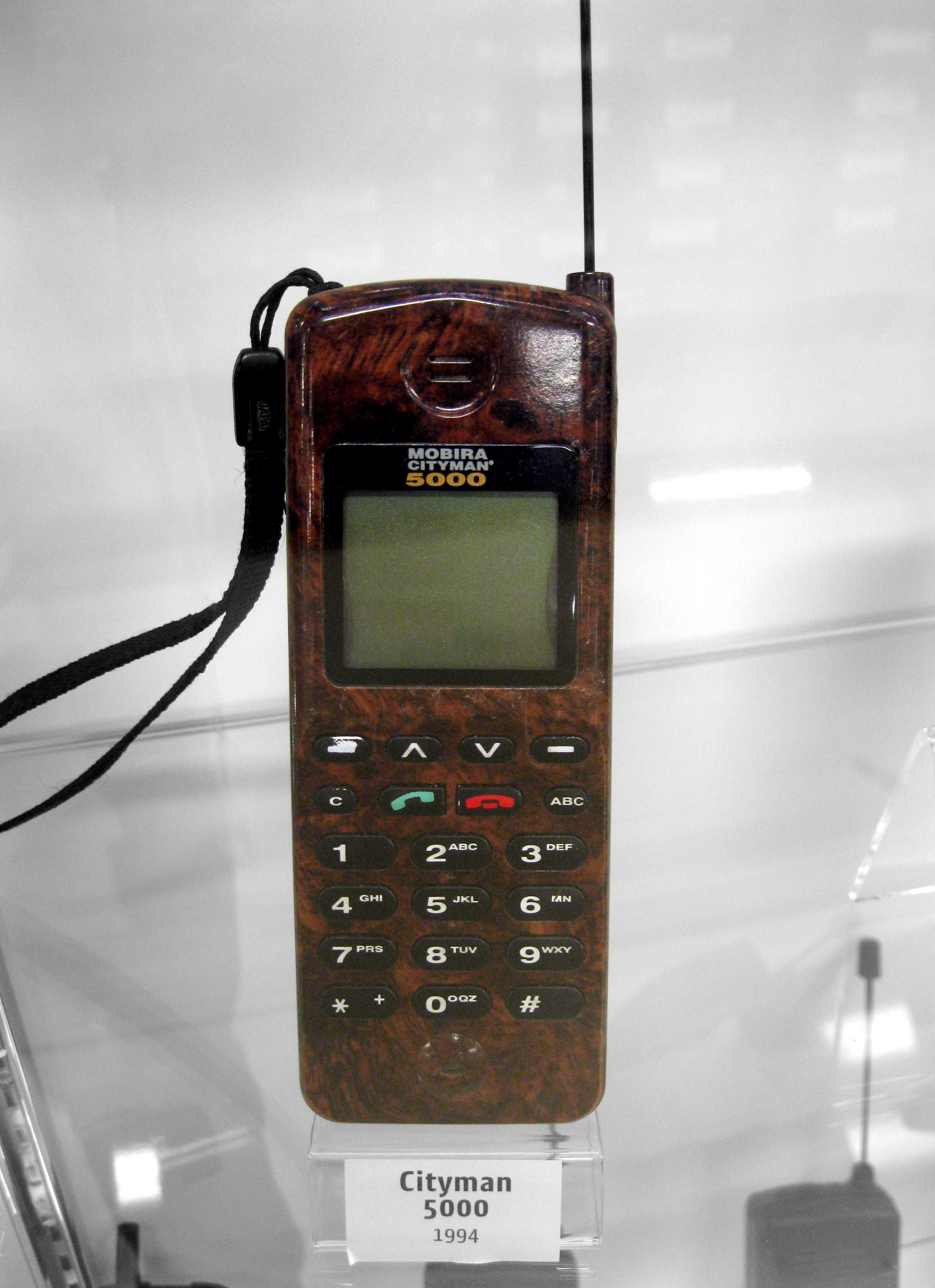
Mobile phones gained massive popularity worldwide during the decade.

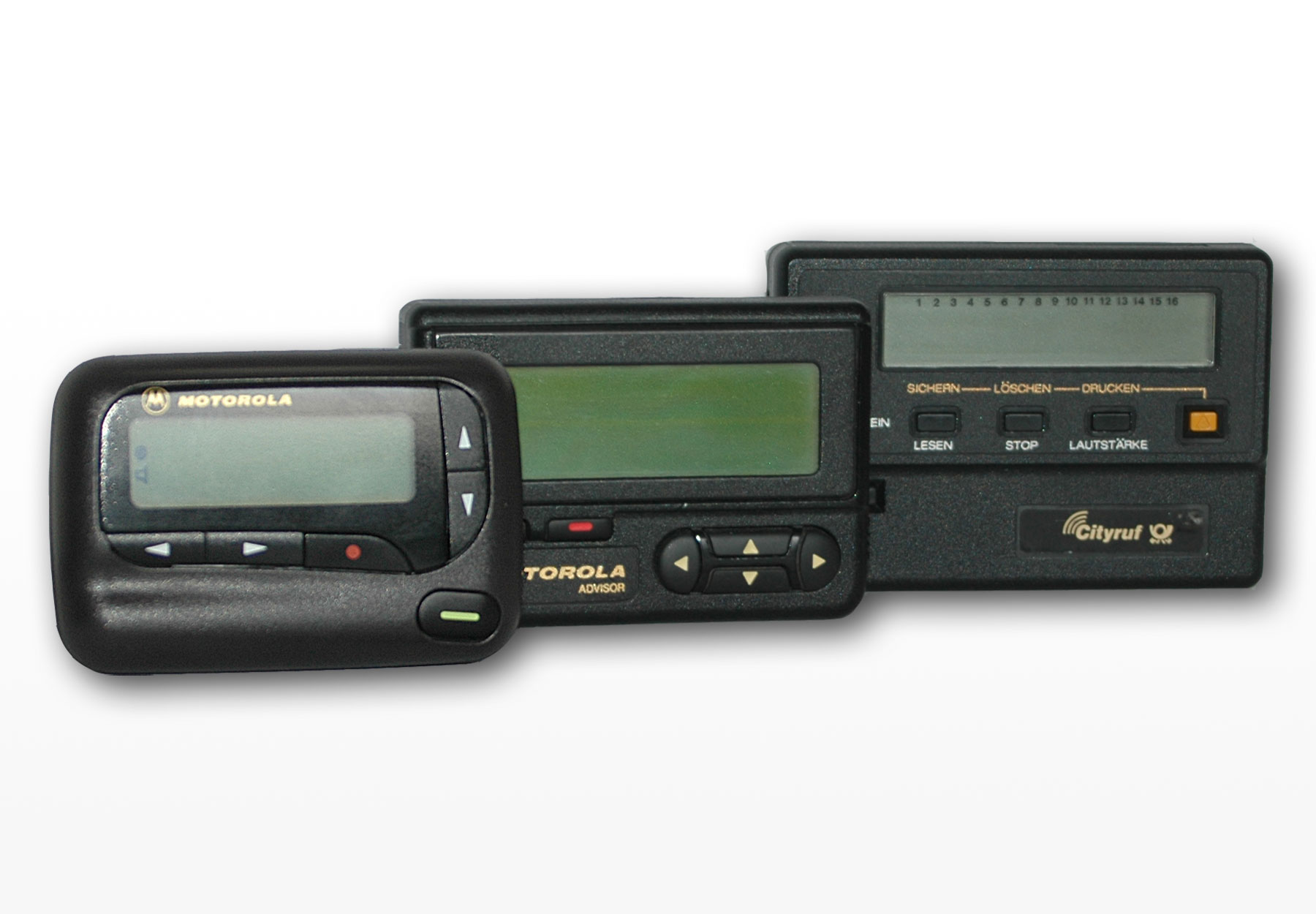
Pagers became widely popular.

==== Software ====
- Microsoft Windows operating systems become virtually ubiquitous on IBM PC compatibles.
- Microsoft introduces Windows 3.1, Windows 95, and Windows 98 to the market, which gain immediate popularity.
- Macintosh System 7 was released in 1991. For much of the decade, Apple would struggle to develop a next-generation graphical operating system, starting with Copland and culminating in its December 1996 buyout of NeXT and the 1999 release of Mac OS X Server 1.0.
- The development of web browsers such as Netscape Navigator and Internet Explorer makes surfing the World Wide Web easier and more user-friendly.
- The Java programming language is developed by Sun Microsystems (later acquired by Oracle in 2009–2010).
- In 1991, development of the free Linux kernel was started by 21-year-old Linus Torvalds in Finland.
- SolidWorks computer-aided design software for Windows released in 1995.
- Macromedia Shockwave Player for multimedia in browsers released in 1995.
- Winamp media player first released 1997.
- QuickTime media player created in 1991.

==== Rail transportation ====
The opening of the Channel Tunnel between France and the United Kingdom saw the commencement by the three national railway companies of Belgium, France, and the United Kingdom, respectively SNCB/NMBS, SNCF and British Rail of the joint Eurostar service.

Eurostar logo 1994–2011

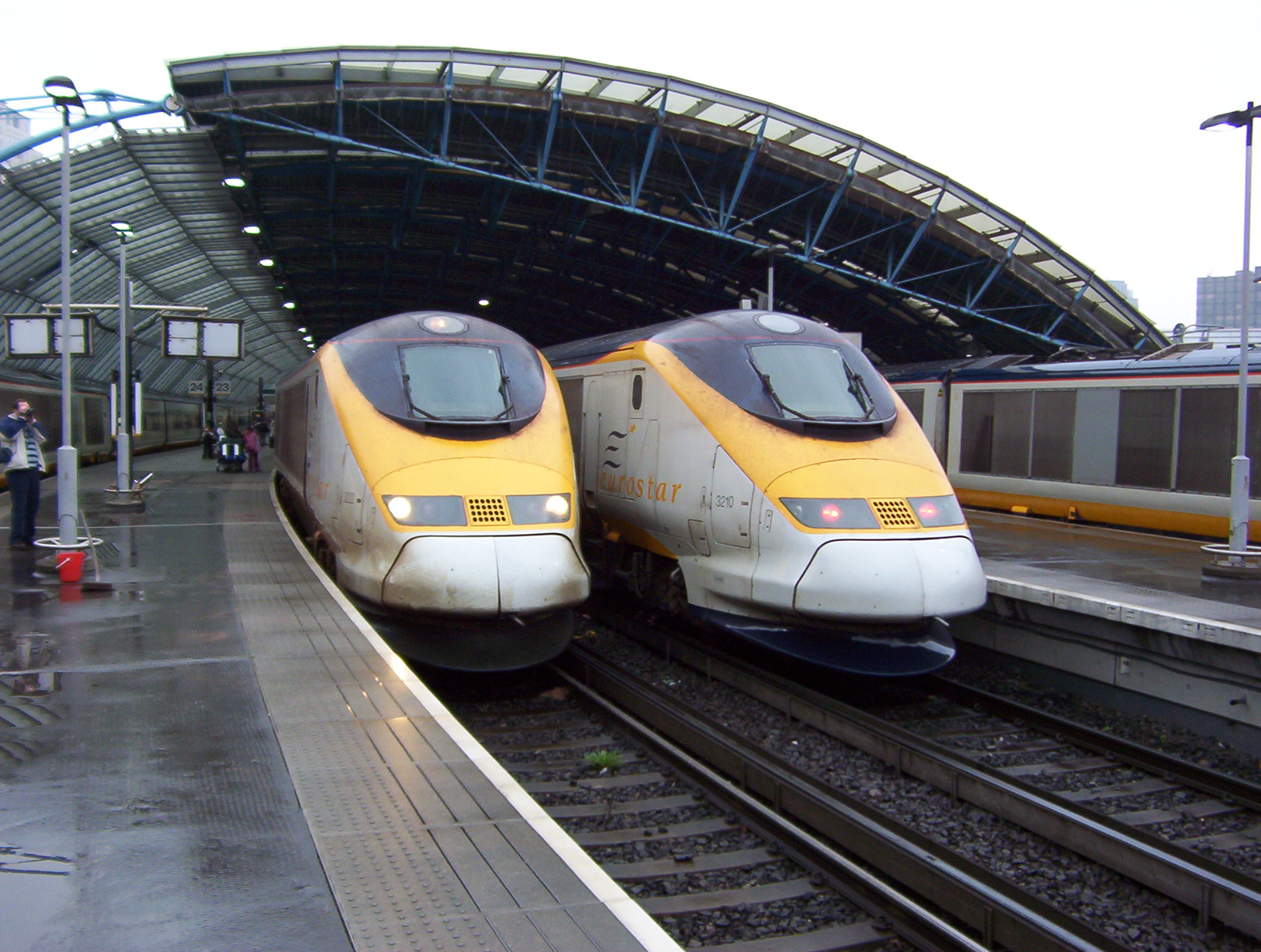
A pair of Eurostar trains at the former Waterloo International since moved to St Pancras International

On 14 November 1994 Eurostar services began between Waterloo International station in London, Gare du Nord in Paris and Brussels South in Brussels. In 1995 Eurostar was achieving an average end-to-end speed of 171.5 km/h (106.6 mph) between London and Paris. On 8 January 1996 Eurostar launched services from a second railway station in the UK when Ashford International was opened. Journey times between London and Brussels were reduced by the opening of the High Speed 1 line on 14 December 1997.

==== Automobiles ====
The 1990s began with a recession that dampened car sales. General Motors suffered huge losses because of an inefficient structure, stale designs, and poor quality. Sales improved with the economy by the mid-1990s, but GM's US market share gradually declined to less than 40% (from a peak of 50% in the 1970s). While the new Saturn division fared well, Oldsmobile fell sharply, and attempts to remake the division as a European-style luxury car were unsuccessful.

Cars in the 1990s had a rounder, more streamlined shape than those from the 1970s and 1980s; this style would continue early into the 2000s and to a lesser extent later on.

Chrysler ran into financial troubles as it entered the 1990s. Like GM, the Chrysler too had a stale model lineup (except for the best-selling minivans) that were largely based on the aging K-car platform. In 1992, chairman Lee Iacocca retired, and the company began a remarkable revival, introducing the new LH platform and "Cab-Forward" styling, along with a highly successful redesign of the full-sized Dodge Ram in 1994. Chrysler's minivans continued to dominate the market despite increasing competition. In 1998, Daimler-Benz (the parent company of Mercedes-Benz) merged with Chrysler. The following year, it was decided to retire Plymouth, which had been on a long decline since the 1970s. Ford continued to fare well in the 1990s, with the second and third generations of the Ford Taurus being named the best-selling car in the United States from 1992 to 1996. However, the Taurus would be outsold and dethroned by the Toyota Camry starting in 1997, which became the best-selling car in the United States for the rest of the decade and into the 2000s. Ford also introduced the Ford Explorer, with the first model being sold in 1991. Ford's Explorer became the best-selling SUV on the market, outselling both the Chevy Blazer and Jeep Cherokee.

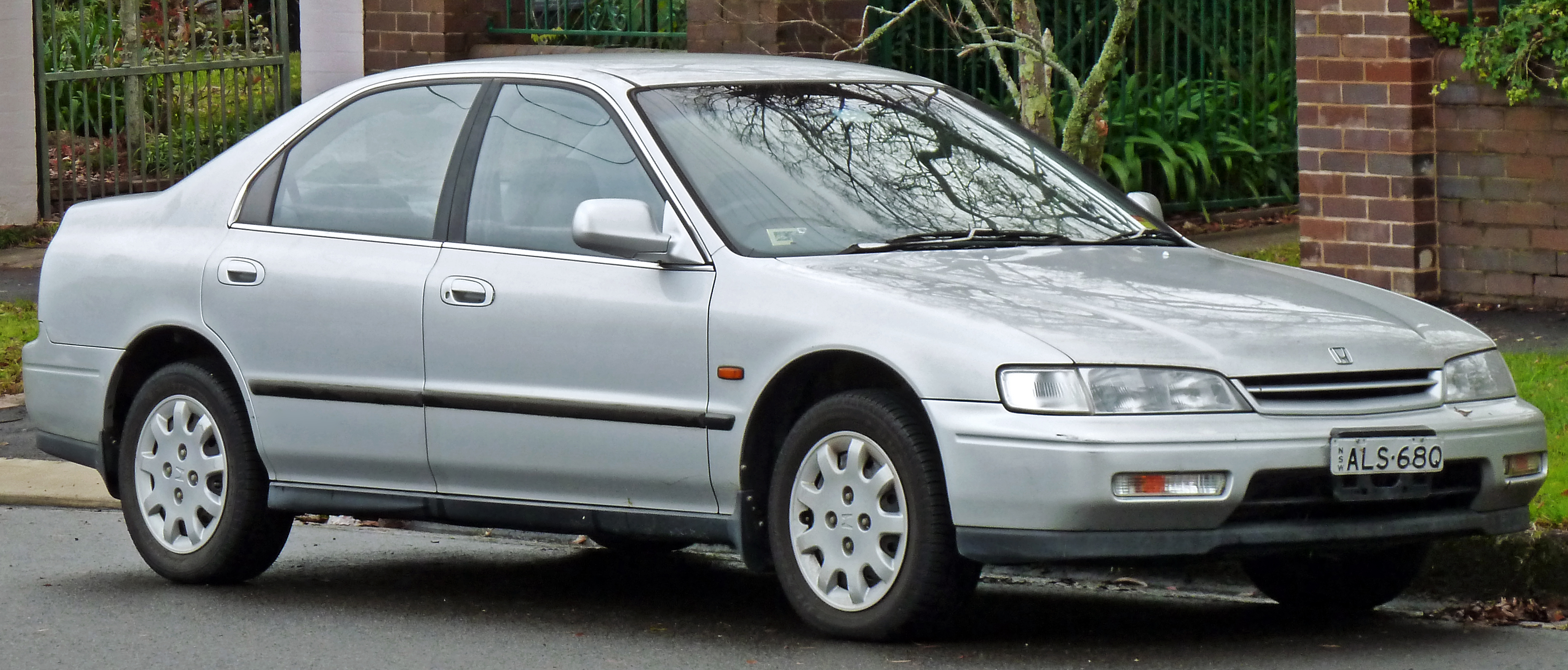
1993–1995 Honda Accord EXi sedan. A typical mid-1990s car.

Japanese cars continued to be highly successful during the decade. The Honda Accord vied with the Taurus most years for being the best-selling car in the United States during the early decade. Although launched in 1989, the luxury brands Lexus and Infiniti began car sales of 1990 model year vehicles and saw great success. Lexus would go on to outsell Mercedes-Benz and BMW in the United States by 1991 and outsell Cadillac and Lincoln by the end of the decade. SUVs and trucks became hugely popular during the economic boom in the decade's second half. Many manufacturers that had never built a truck before started selling SUVs. Fabrication during the 1990s became gradually rounder and ovoid, the Ford Taurus and Mercury Sable being some of the more extreme examples. Safety features such as airbags and shoulder belts became mandatory equipment on new cars.

=== Science ===
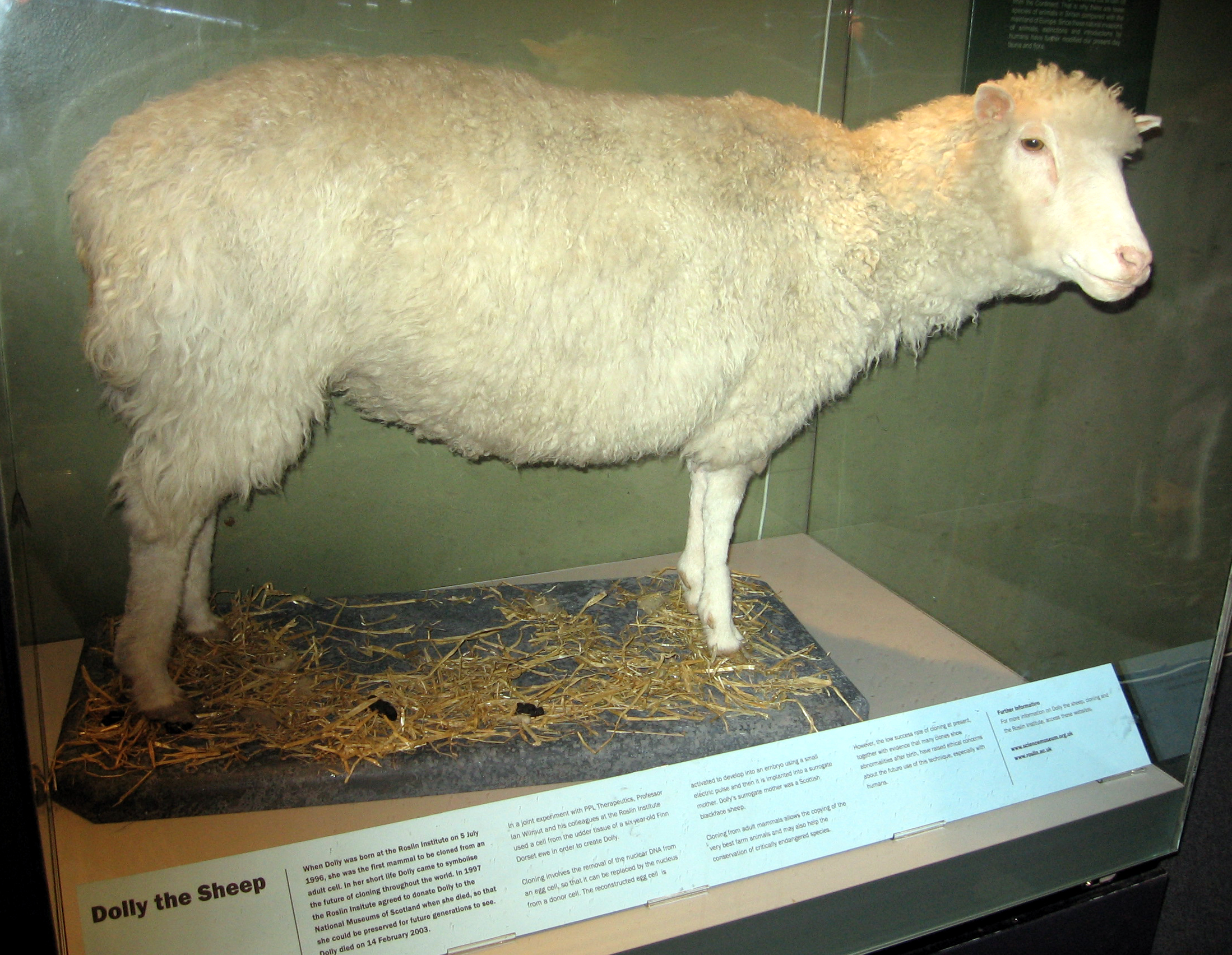
Dolly the sheep is the first mammal to be cloned from an adult somatic cell.

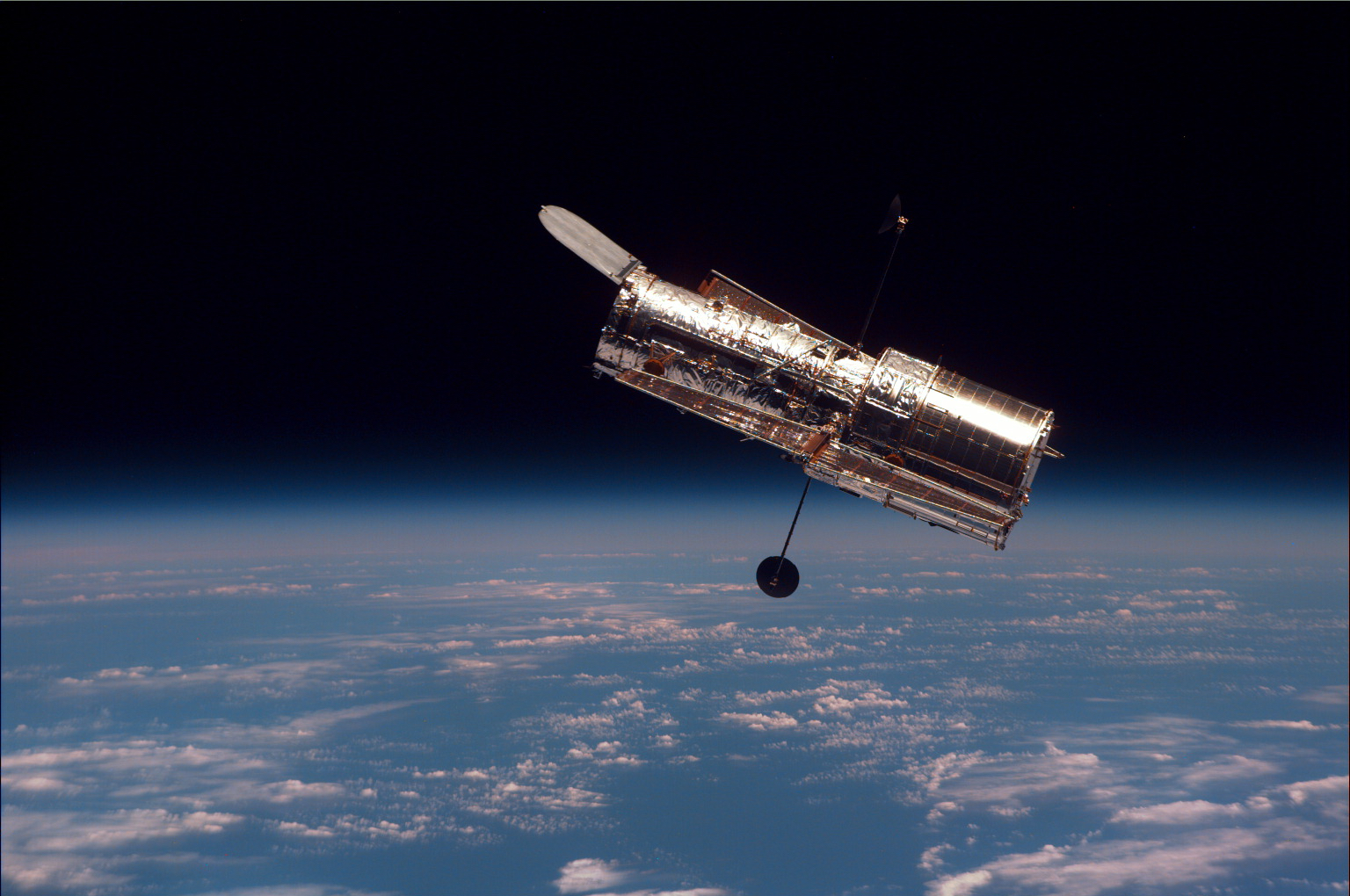
Hubble Space Telescope.

- Physicists develop M-theory.
- Detection of extrasolar planets orbiting stars other than the Sun.
- In the United Kingdom, the first cloned mammal, Dolly the sheep was confirmed by the Roslin Institute, and was reported by global media on 26 February 1997. Dolly would trigger a raging controversy on cloning, and bioethical concerns regarding possible human cloning continue to this day.
- The NIH launched the Human Genome Project in 1990 under the leadership of Francis Collins, with the goal of sequencing the entire human genome. In the same year, Mary-Claire King's discovery of the link between heritable breast cancers and a gene found on chromosome 17q21 lead to a wave of collaborative research. The Human Genome Project was partially completed in 2003 with a 92% accuracy. It was not until 2022 that the final complete human genome sequence was published.
- DNA identification of individuals finds wide application in criminal law. Brazil, United States, United Kingdom, Russia and The Netherlands established their own national DNA database.
- Hubble Space Telescope was launched in 1990 and revolutionized astronomy. Unfortunately, a flaw in its main mirror caused it to produce fuzzy, distorted images. This was corrected by a Space Shuttle repair mission in 1993.
- Protease inhibitors introduced, allowing HAART therapy against HIV; drastically reduces AIDS mortality.
- NASA's spacecraft Pathfinder lands on Mars and deploys a small roving vehicle, Sojourner, which analyzes the planet's geology and atmosphere.
- The Hale–Bopp comet swings past the Sun for the first time in 4,200 years in April 1997.
- Development of biodegradable products, replacing products made from polystyrene foam; advances in methods for recycling of waste products (such as paper, glass, and aluminum).
- Genetically engineered crops are developed for commercial use.
- Discovery of dark matter, dark energy, brown dwarfs, and first confirmation of black holes.
- The Galileo probe orbits Jupiter, studying the planet and its moons extensively.
- Comet Shoemaker–Levy 9 (formally designated D/1993 F2, nicknamed String of Pearls for its appearance) was a comet that broke apart and collided with Jupiter in July 1994, providing the first direct observation of an extraterrestrial collision of Solar System objects.
- The Global Positioning System (GPS) becomes fully operational.
- Proof of Fermat's Last Theorem is discovered by Andrew Wiles.
- Construction started in 1998 on the International Space Station.

== Society ==
President Bill Clinton speaks on "Don't ask, don't tell" on 19 July 1993, which was the United States policy regarding homosexuals in the military implemented from 1994 to 2011.

The 1990s represented continuing social liberalization in most countries, coupled with an increase in the influence of capitalism, which would continue until the Great Recession of the late 2000s/early 2010s.

- Youth culture in the 1990s responded to this by embracing both environmentalism and entrepreneurship. Fashion of the Western world reflected this by often turning highly individualistic and/or counter-cultural, which was influenced by Generation X and early millennials: tattoos and body piercings gained popularity, and "retro" styles, inspired by fashions of the 1960s and 1970s, were also prevalent. Some young people became increasingly involved in extreme sports and outdoor activities that combined embracing athletics with the appreciation of nature.
- In 1990 the World Health Organization removed homosexuality from its list of diseases. Increasing acceptance of openly homosexual people occurred in the western world, slowly starting in the early 1990s. Biphobia towards bisexual men became somewhat fashionable amongst heterosexual women and gay men, while lesbians and bisexual women complained of being commodified by publishing and film industries to cater to heterosexual men.
- Following the murder of actress Rebecca Schaeffer by a stalker, America's first anti-stalking laws, including California Penal Code 646.9 were passed in 1990. California also passed the first cyberstalking law in 1999 (§646.9 of the California Penal Code).
- Transdisciplinarity in academia. The 1st World Congress of Transdisciplinarity, Convento da Arrabida, was in Portugal, November 1994.
- Child abduction warnings on emergency broadcasting systems, such as Amber alerts became standard in such cases.
- Midlife crisis is a major concern in domestic violence, social implications and suicides for middle-aged adults in the 1990s.
- Aggressive marketing tactics for psychoactive drugs and used to treat ADHD, inappropriate prescribing by doctors.

=== Environment ===
At the beginning of the decade, sustainable development and environmental protection became serious issues for governments and the international community. In 1987, the publication of the Brundtland Report by the United Nations paved the way to establish an environmental governance. In 1992, the Earth Summit was held in Rio de Janeiro, in which several countries committed to protect the environment, signing a Convention on Biological Diversity.

The prevention of the destruction of the tropical rainforests of the world is a major environmental cause that first came into wide public concern in the early 1990s and has continued and accelerated in its prominence.

The Chernobyl disaster had significant impact on public opinion at the end of the 1980s, and the fallout was still causing cancer deaths well into the 1990s and possibly even into the 21st century. Well into the 1990s, several environmental NGOs helped improve environmental awareness among public opinion and governments. The most famous of these organizations during this decade was Greenpeace, which did not hesitate to lead illegal actions in the name of environmental preservation. These organizations also drew attention to the large deforestation of the Amazon rainforest during the period.

Global warming as an aspect of climate change also became a major concern, and the creation of the United Nations Framework Convention on Climate Change (UNFCCC) after the Earth Summit helped coordinate efforts to reduce carbon emissions in the atmosphere. From 1995, the UNFCCC held annual summits on climate change, leading to the adoption of the Kyoto Protocol in December 1997, a binding agreement signed by several developed countries.

The 1989 EPA total ban on asbestos was overturned in 1991.

In 1996, (Anderson, et al. v. Pacific Gas & Electric, file BCV 00300) alleged contamination of drinking water with hexavalent chromium and the case was settled for (US) $333 million, a new record for a direct-action lawsuit.

=== Third-wave feminism ===
First Lady Hillary Clinton addresses the United Nations Women's Conference on 5 September 1995, in which she gave her famous "Women's rights are human rights" speech.

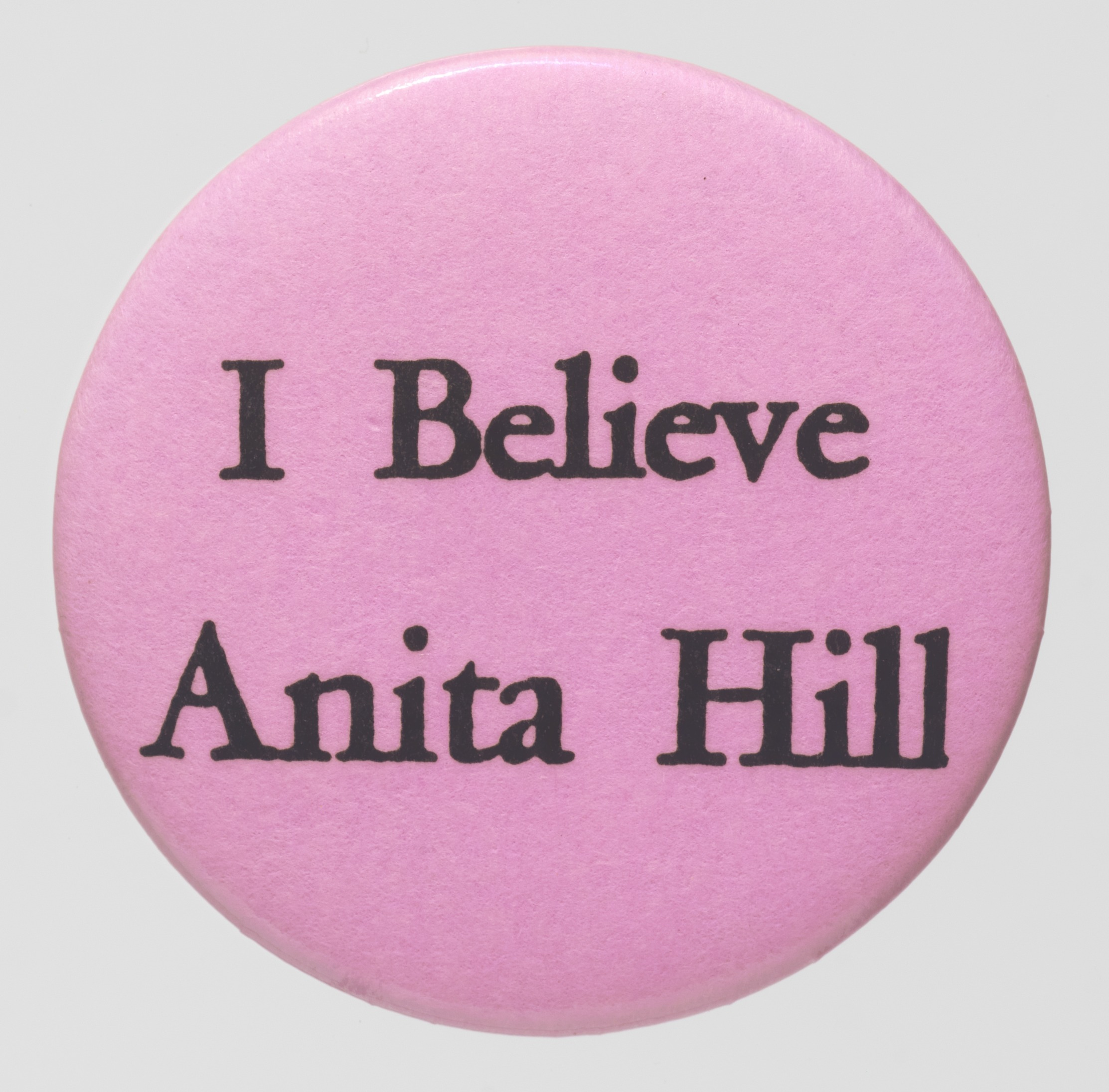
An "I Believe Anita Hill" button pin in support of her sexual harassment allegations against U.S. Supreme Court nominee Clarence Thomas. Hill testified before the Senate Judiciary Committee arguing against the confirmation of Thomas.

- Anita Hill and other women testify before the United States Congress on being sexually harassed by Supreme Court nominee Clarence Thomas. Thomas was narrowly confirmed by the United States Senate, but Hill's testimony, and the testimony of other harassed women, begins a national debate on the issue.
- Record numbers of women are elected to high office in the United States in 1992, the "Year of the Woman".
- Violence against women takes centre stage as an essential issue internationally. The Violence Against Women Act was passed in the United States, which greatly affected the world community through the United Nations. The law's author, Joe Biden, UN Ambassador and Secretary of State Madeleine Albright, and Hillary Clinton (see below) have become vocal advocates of action against violence against women.
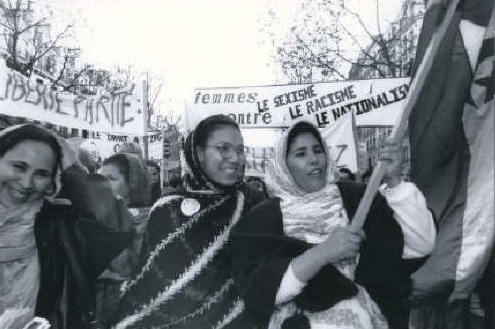
  Women's rights demonstration in Paris, November 1995
- Women reach great heights of power in the United States government. Hillary Clinton, leading policy proposals, traveling abroad as a State Department representative to 82 nations, advising her husband, and being elected a senator (in 2000), is the most openly empowered and politically powerful first lady in American history; Madeleine Albright and Janet Reno take two of the cabinet's top jobs as United States Secretary of State (#1), and United States Attorney General (#4), respectively. Sheila Widnall becomes head and Secretary of the Air Force, and Ruth Bader Ginsburg joins Sandra Day O'Connor as the second woman on the U.S. Supreme Court.
- More nations than ever before are led by elected women Presidents and Prime Ministers. Prime Minister Benazir Bhutto's 1988 victory in Pakistan makes great strides for women leaders in Muslim states. In Turkey, Tansu Çiller became the first female prime minister in 1993.
- In popular culture, British pop group the Spice Girls also played a part in the feminist movement, boosting popularity with their slogan "Girl Power!", while country music superstar Shania Twain declared female supremacy in her 1995 hit song "Any Man of Mine."

=== Baby boomers ===
Marketing campaigns aimed at young adults in wealthy English-Speaking Countries were informed by unscientific theories about selling to so-called Generation X and Baby boomers. Few people embraced the labels Generation X and Baby Boomer as self-descriptors. Films with characters depicting the Generation X stereotype included Slacker (1990), The Brady Bunch Movie (1995) and Austin Powers.

=== Substance abuse ===
- In Western countries, Fashion and Music magazines embrace heroin chic.
- Peak in numbers of heroin overdose deaths.
- An estimated fifty percent of deaths of 15–54 in post-Soviet Russia are blamed on alcohol abuse.
- More restrictions on tobacco advertising in some countries.

=== Slavery and human trafficking ===
See: History of slavery, Global Slavery Index, Slavery in contemporary Africa, Slavery in Asia, Debt bondage in India, Child labour in Pakistan, Sex trafficking in China, Nike sweatshops

- Pakistan

Pakistan's government passed laws to end caste based slavery: - 1992 Bonded Labour System (Abolition) Act. - 1995 Bonded Labour System (Abolition) Rules.

=== Civil rights ===
- Saudi Arabia: Women to drive movement. 6 November 1990, 47 Saudi women in Riyadh protested Saudi government's ban on women drivers.
- United States: 1992 Rosa Parks: My Story, the autobiography of Rosa Parks is published.

== Additional significant events ==
- Worldwide New Year's Eve celebrations on 31 December 1999, welcoming the year 2000.

Europe

- 1991 – January Events (Lithuania) – Soviet Union military troops attack Lithuanian independence supporters in Vilnius, killing 14 people and wounding 1000.
- In Paris, Diana, Princess of Wales and her fiancé, Dodi Al-Fayed, were killed in a car accident in August 1997, when their chauffeured, hired Mercedes-Benz S-Class crashed in the Pont de l'Alma tunnel. The chauffeur, Henri Paul, died at the scene, as did Al-Fayed. Diana and an Al-Fayed bodyguard, Trevor Rees-Jones, survived the accident. The Princess of Wales died at a Paris hospital hours later. The bodyguard, Rees-Jones, is the sole survivor of the now infamous accident.
- Mother Teresa, the Roman Catholic nun who won the Nobel Peace Prize, dies at age 87.
- The birth of the "Second Republic" in Italy, with the Mani Pulite investigations of 1994.
- The Channel Tunnel across the English Channel opens in 1994, connecting France and England. As of 2022 it is the third-longest rail tunnel in the world, but with the undersea section of 37.9 km (23.5 mi) being the longest undersea tunnel in the world.
- The resignation of President Boris Yeltsin on 31 December 1999 resulted in Prime Minister Vladimir Putin's succession to the position.

North America

- Eric Harris and Dylan Klebold kill 14 people and then themselves during the Columbine High School shooting in April 1999, which would inspire a number of future school shooters to commit similar offenses.
- O. J. Simpson murder case – O. J. Simpson's trial, described in the American media as the "trial of the century", proceeds for nearly a year under intense media publicity. A majority of the trial was broadcast nightly during prime time television. On 3 October 1995, Simpson was found not guilty of the double-murder of ex-wife Nicole Brown Simpson and her friend, Ronald Goldman.
- With help from clinical fertility drugs, an Iowa mother, Bobbie McCaughey, gave birth to the first surviving septuplets in 1997. There followed a media frenzy and widespread support for the family.
- John F. Kennedy Jr., his wife Carolyn Bessette and sister-in-law Lauren Bessette are killed when Kennedy's private plane crashes off the coast of Martha's Vineyard in July 1999.
- Debate on assisted suicide, highly publicized by Michigan doctor Jack Kevorkian, surfaces when Kevorkian is charged with multiple counts of homicide of his terminally ill patients through the decade.
- Beer keg registration becomes a popular public policy in the United States.
- The 500th anniversary of Christopher Columbus' purported discovery of the Americas in 1992 was popularly observed in the United States, despite controversy and protests against the victimization of Native Americans by Columbus' expeditions. The holiday was labeled by some as racist, in view of Native American experiences of colonialism, slavery, genocide, and cultural destruction.
- Matthew Shepard is murdered near the University of Wyoming, purportedly for being gay. This sparks intense national and international media attention and outrage. Shepard becomes a major symbol in the LGBT rights movement and the fight against homophobia. Claims of crystal methamphetamine related "meth rage" as a contributing factor in the crime surfaced in 2013.
- Shanda Sharer was murdered on 11 January 1992. She was lured away from her house and held captive by a group of teenage girls. She was tortured for hours and burned alive. She died from smoke inhalation. Those found guilty and sentenced to prison were Melinda Loveless, Laurie Tackett, Hope Rippey, and Toni Lawrence. According to Loveless, she was jealous of her former partner Amanda Heavrin's relationship with Shanda Sharer.
- Karla Homolka was arrested with her husband, Paul Bernardo, in 1993. Both sexually tortured and killed their victims. Their first victim was Karla's 15-year-old sister, Tammy Homolka. The second and third victims were Leslie Mahaffy and Kristen French. Karla told the investigators that she reluctantly did what Paul told her to do because he was abusive, and was given a plea deal. She was sentenced to 12 years in prison (10 years for Mahaffy and French, and two years for Tammy). Later, investigators discovered the crime videotapes, proving that Karla was a willing participant. But by that time the deal had already been made. In 1995, Paul was sentenced to life in prison. Karla was released from prison in 2005.
- Polly Klaas (3 January 1981 – October 1993) was kidnapped by Richard Allen Davis from her home during a slumber party. She was later strangled to death. After her death, her father, Marc Klaas, established the KlaasKids Foundation.
- Jonbenet Ramsey (6 August 1990 – 25 December 1996) was a child beauty pageant contestant who was missing and found dead in her Boulder, Colorado, home. The crime terrified the nation and the world. Her parents were initially considered to be suspects in her death but were cleared in 2003 when DNA from her clothes was tested. To this day, her murderer has not been found and brought to justice.
- Lorena Bobbitt was charged with malicious wounding for severing her husband John Bobbitt's penis after she was repeatedly sexually assaulted by Bobbitt, for which he was charged. Both parties were acquitted of their respective crimes. The story was notable because of the use of Microsurgery to re-attach the man's penis.
- Wanda Holloway was convicted of solicitation of capital murder when she attempted to hire a hitman to kill the mother of her daughter's junior high school cheerleading rival.
- American singer-songwriter, guitarist, and actor John Denver died in a plane crash in Monterey Bay near Pacific Grove on 12 October 1997.
- Scandal rocked the sport of figure skating when skater Nancy Kerrigan was attacked during practice by an assailant hired by Jeff Gillooly, former husband of skater Tonya Harding. The attack was carried out in an attempt to injure Kerrigan's leg to the point of her being unable to compete in the upcoming 1994 Winter Olympics, thereby securing Harding a better spot to win a gold medal.
- 1992 Los Angeles riots – resulted in 53 deaths and 5,500 property fires in a 100-square-mile (260 km^{2}) riot zone. The riots were a result of the state court acquittal of three white and one Hispanic L.A. police officer by an all-white jury in a police brutality case involving motorist Rodney King. In 1993, all four officers were convicted in a federal civil rights case.

South America

- In 1990, the last military uprising attempting at a military coup in Argentine history, was successfully put down by the government.
- In 1994, Conscription ceases to exist and becomes voluntary in Argentina after the murder of a conscript which caused great social upheaval, the trial to clarify the cause of death was named Caso Carrasco.
- The government of Carlos Menem privatized several enterprises owned by the Argentine state, such as YPF, Aerolíneas Argentinas, Ferrocarriles Argentinos, Radio y Televisión Argentina, among others.
- Puerto Madero, the richest neighbourhood of South America is developed during the 1990s in Buenos Aires, due to the great economic growth Argentina experienced.

Asia

- Massive immigration wave of Jews from the Commonwealth of Independent States to Israel – With the end of the Soviet Union, Israel faced a mass influx of Russian Jews, many of whom had high expectations the country was unable to meet. Israel also came under an Iraqi missile attack during the Gulf War but acquiesced to US pressure not to retaliate militarily, which could have disrupted the US-Arab alliance. The US and Netherlands then rushed anti-missile batteries to Israel to defend the country against missile attacks.
- The Spratly Islands issue became one of the most controversial islands in Southeast Asia.
- The closing Mass of the X World Youth Day 1995 was held in Rizal Park on 15 January 1995, attended by more than 5 million people. This is the record gathering of the Roman Catholic Church.
- The Philippines celebrates the 100th anniversary of Philippine Independence in 1998 with its theme: "Kalayaan: Kayamanan ng Bayan."
- The Ram Janmabhoomi movement centering around the disputed site of the Hindu holy city of Ayodhya in India gathers steam, culminating in the violent demolition of the mosque which stood on the site by Hindu volunteers in 1992. This in turn lead to violent communal riots throughout the country in that year, which also spilled out into the neighbouring Muslim-majority Pakistan & Bangladesh. The Hindu nationalist Bharatiya Janata Party, which spearheaded the movement, wrested power in 1996 after an intensely polarised campaign run along religious lines, defeating the centre-left Gandhian Indian National Congress.
- Pakistan & Bangladesh both witnessed a transition to democracy following the end of the military dictatorships of Zia-ul-Haq & Hussain Muhammad Ershad respectively. In the first half of the decade, both countries were led by women. Benazir Bhutto's election in Pakistan was the first instance of a woman heading the government in a Muslim-majority country, followed by Khaleda Zia in Bangladesh. In Pakistan, Bhutto's opponent was Nawaz Sharif, while Zia faced challenge from another woman, Sheikh Hasina.

== Popular culture ==
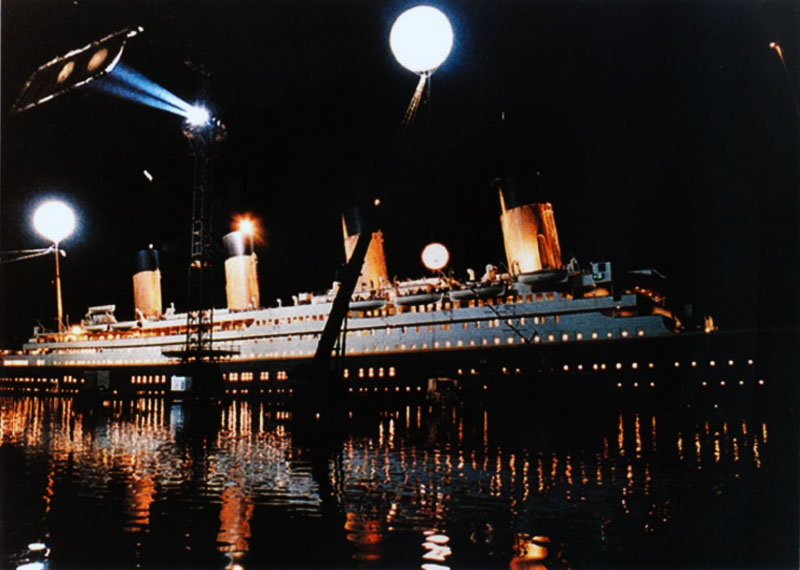
Popular films of the decade included Titanic, Jurassic Park, The Lion King, Forrest Gump, Saving Private Ryan, The Matrix, Pulp Fiction, Schindler's List, The Silence of the Lambs, Independence Day, Toy Story, Terminator 2: Judgment Day, and Men in Black, many of which became critical and commercial landmarks of the decade.

TV shows like Seinfeld, Friends, ER, The X-Files, Frasier, Twin Peaks, The Fresh Prince of Bel-Air, Beverly Hills, 90210, In Living Color, Star Trek: The Next Generation, Home Improvement, The Real World, Baywatch, Roseanne, Buffy the Vampire Slayer, Boy Meets World, Cops, Saved by the Bell, and Law & Order were popular in the 1990s.

The decade saw the rise of fourth and fifth-generation consoles like the Super Nintendo, Sega Genesis, PlayStation, and Nintendo 64. Popular games included Super Mario World, Super Mario 64, Sonic the Hedgehog, Street Fighter II, Mortal Kombat, Final Fantasy VII, Doom, Donkey Kong Country, Metal Gear Solid, Tomb Raider, Gran Turismo, Crash Bandicoot, Spyro the Dragon, The Legend of Zelda: Ocarina of Time, GoldenEye 007, and Half-Life.

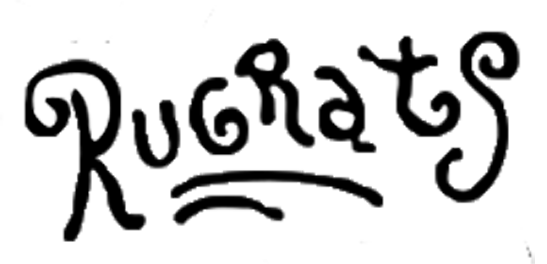
Popular animated TV shows of the 1990s included Rugrats, The Ren & Stimpy Show, Doug, Animaniacs, Tiny Toon Adventures, Darkwing Duck, Batman: The Animated Series, Rocko's Modern Life, Pinky and the Brain, Dexter's Laboratory, X-Men: The Animated Series, Hey Arnold!, Arthur, The Angry Beavers, Johnny Bravo, Cow and Chicken, and The Powerpuff Girls.

Adult animation gained mainstream popularity in the 1990s, with shows such as The Simpsons, Beavis and Butt-Head, South Park, King of the Hill, Daria, and Family Guy. These series featured satirical humor, social commentary, and themes aimed at older audiences, helping establish adult animation as a significant genre in television.

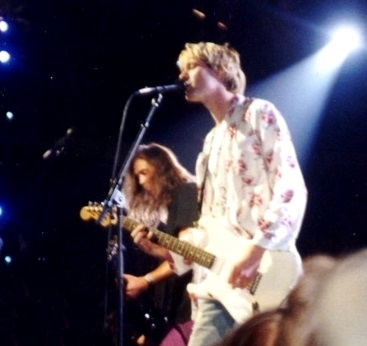
Grunge, Britpop, and alternative rock entered the mainstream in the 1990s with bands such as Nirvana, Pearl Jam, Soundgarden, Alice in Chains, Stone Temple Pilots, Oasis, Blur, The Smashing Pumpkins, Red Hot Chili Peppers, and R.E.M., reshaping mainstream music.

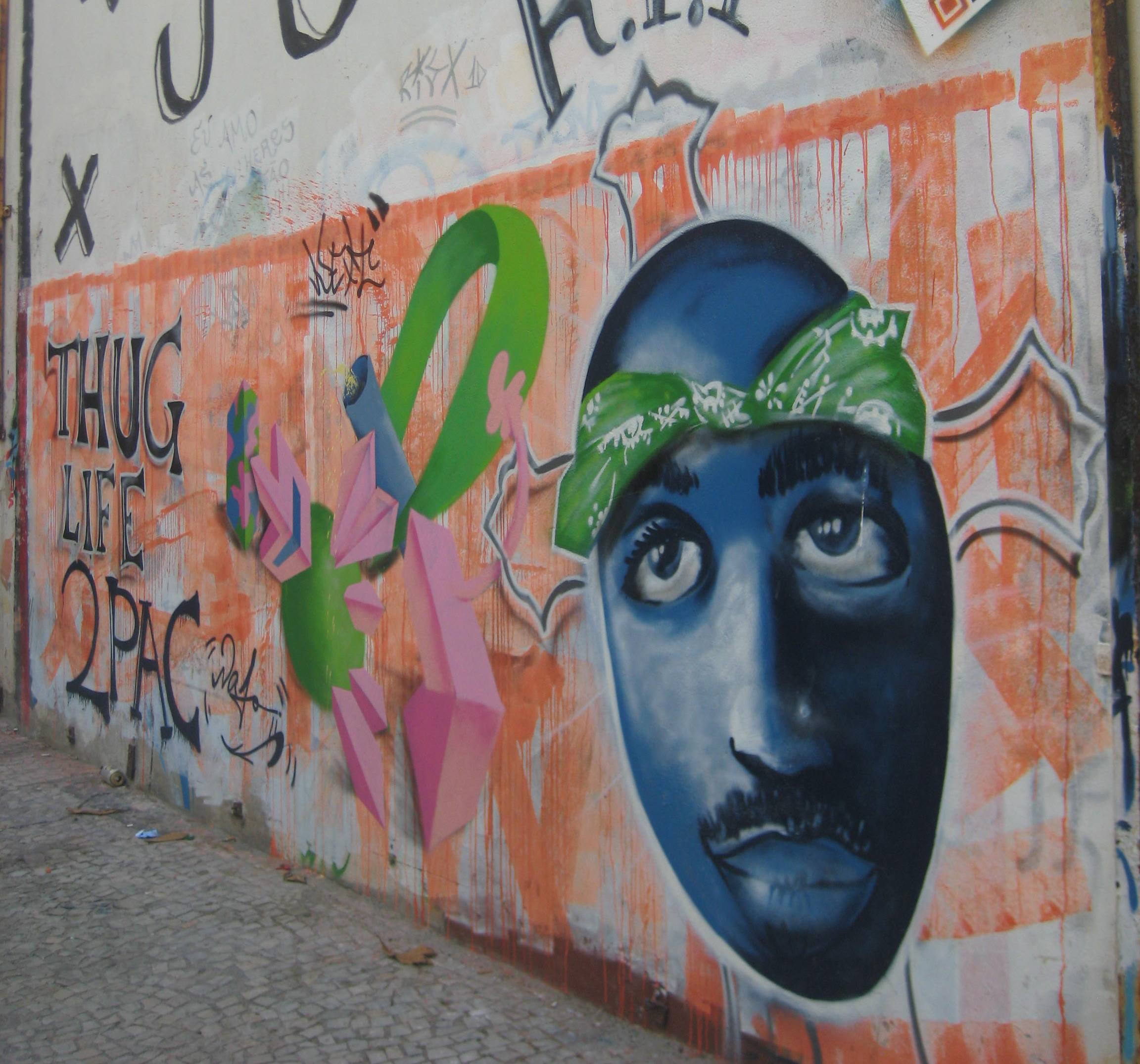
Hip-hop was one of the most defining genres of the decade, with the East Coast–West Coast hip hop rivalry and gangsta rap becoming major parts of mainstream culture. Artists such as Tupac Shakur, The Notorious B.I.G., Nas, and Jay-Z helped shape the decade's sound.

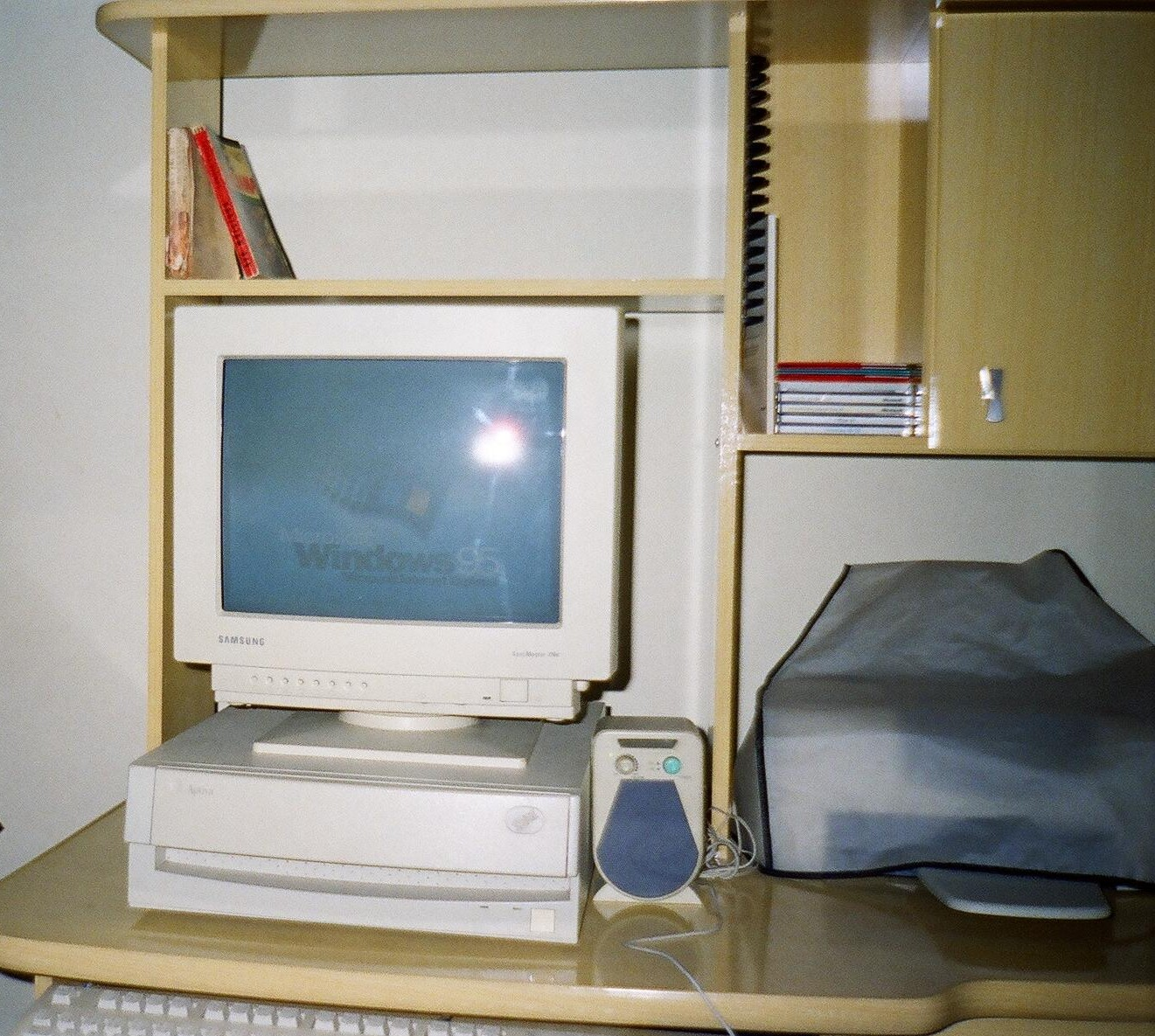
The World Wide Web and the Internet became household technologies in the late 1990s, with operating systems such as Windows 95, Windows 98, and Mac OS 8 helping popularize home access, along with websites like Yahoo!, AOL, GeoCities, Amazon, and eBay.

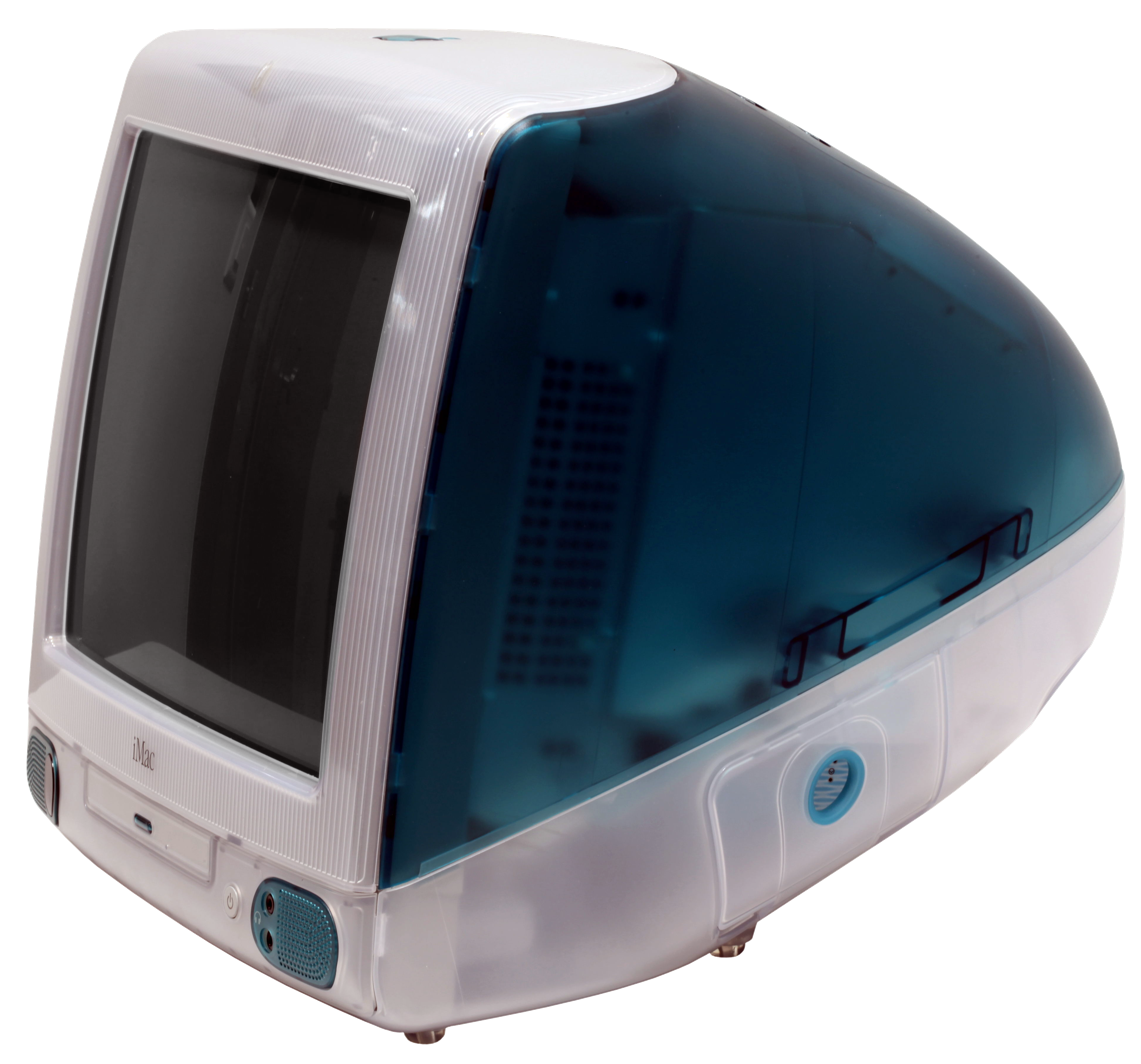
The futuristic Y2K aesthetic was popular in the late 1990s and early 2000s, named after the Y2K bug. This period was defined by then-new technology such as the iMac G3, digital cameras, and fashion such as shiny metallic clothing.

Extreme sports grew in popularity in the 1990s, with Tony Hawk and events like the X Games helping to bring skateboarding, BMX, and snowboarding into the mainstream.

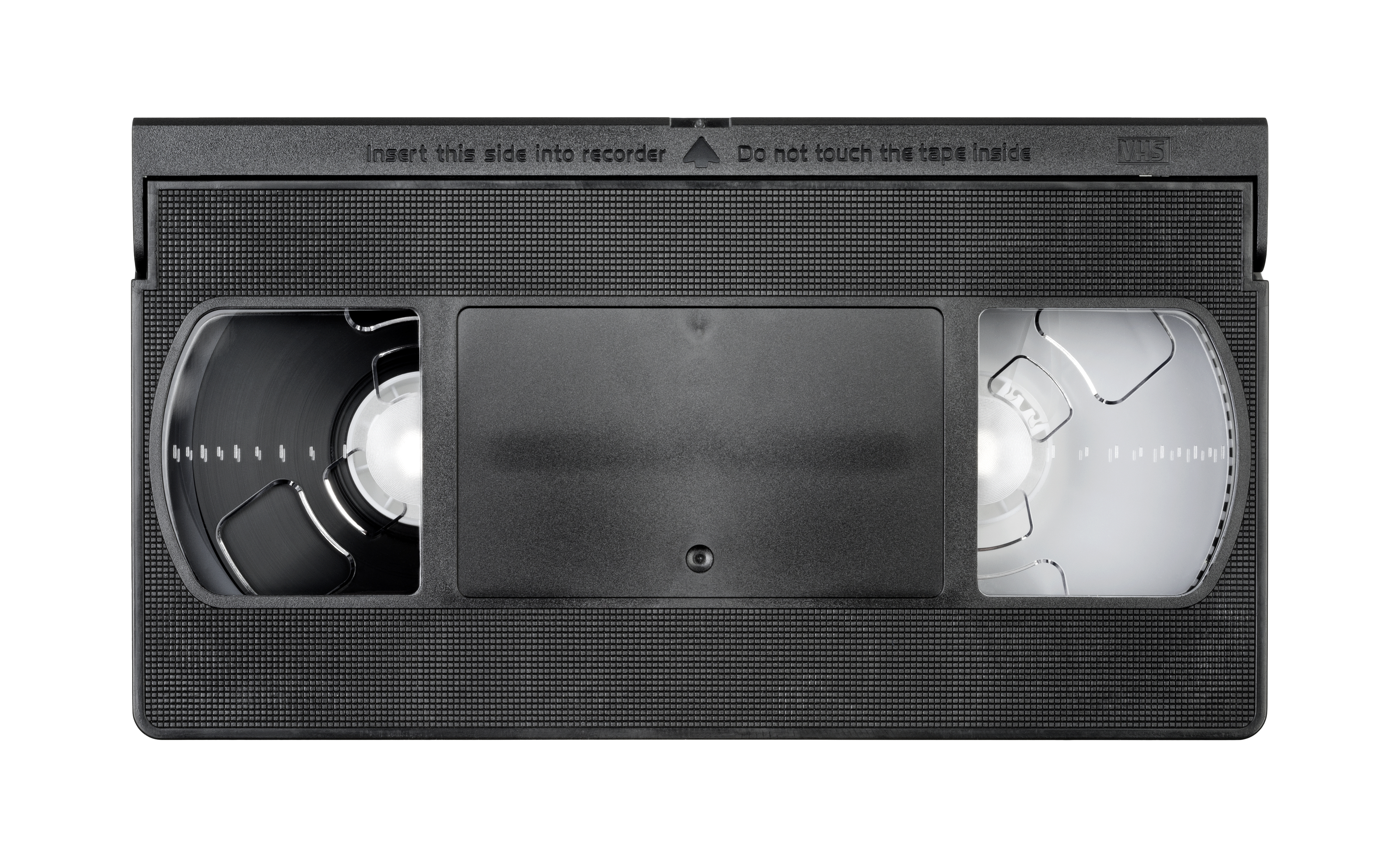
In the 1990s videotapes were used for personal home video recordings and recording television airings. VHS tapes could be put in devices such as VCRs, which were popular in the decade.

Pokémon sparked Pokémania in the late 1990s, becoming a global pop cultural phenomenon through video games, the anime series, trading cards, and merchandise.

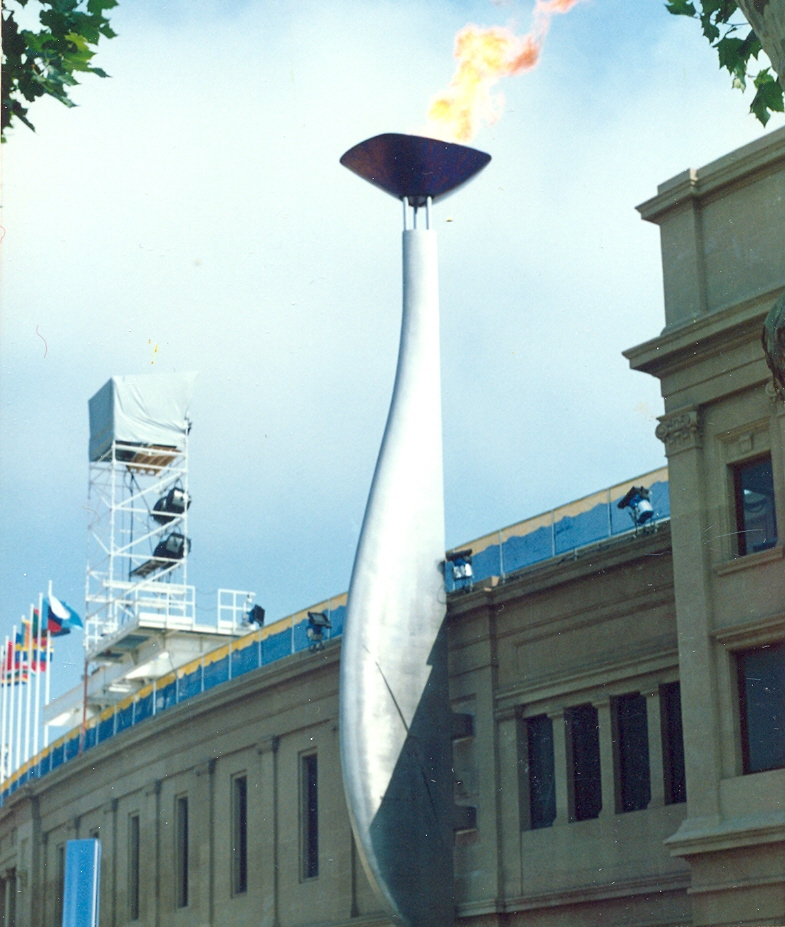
Five Olympic Games were held in the 1990s, Albertville and Barcelona in 1992, Lillehammer in 1994, Atlanta in 1996 and Nagano in 1998.

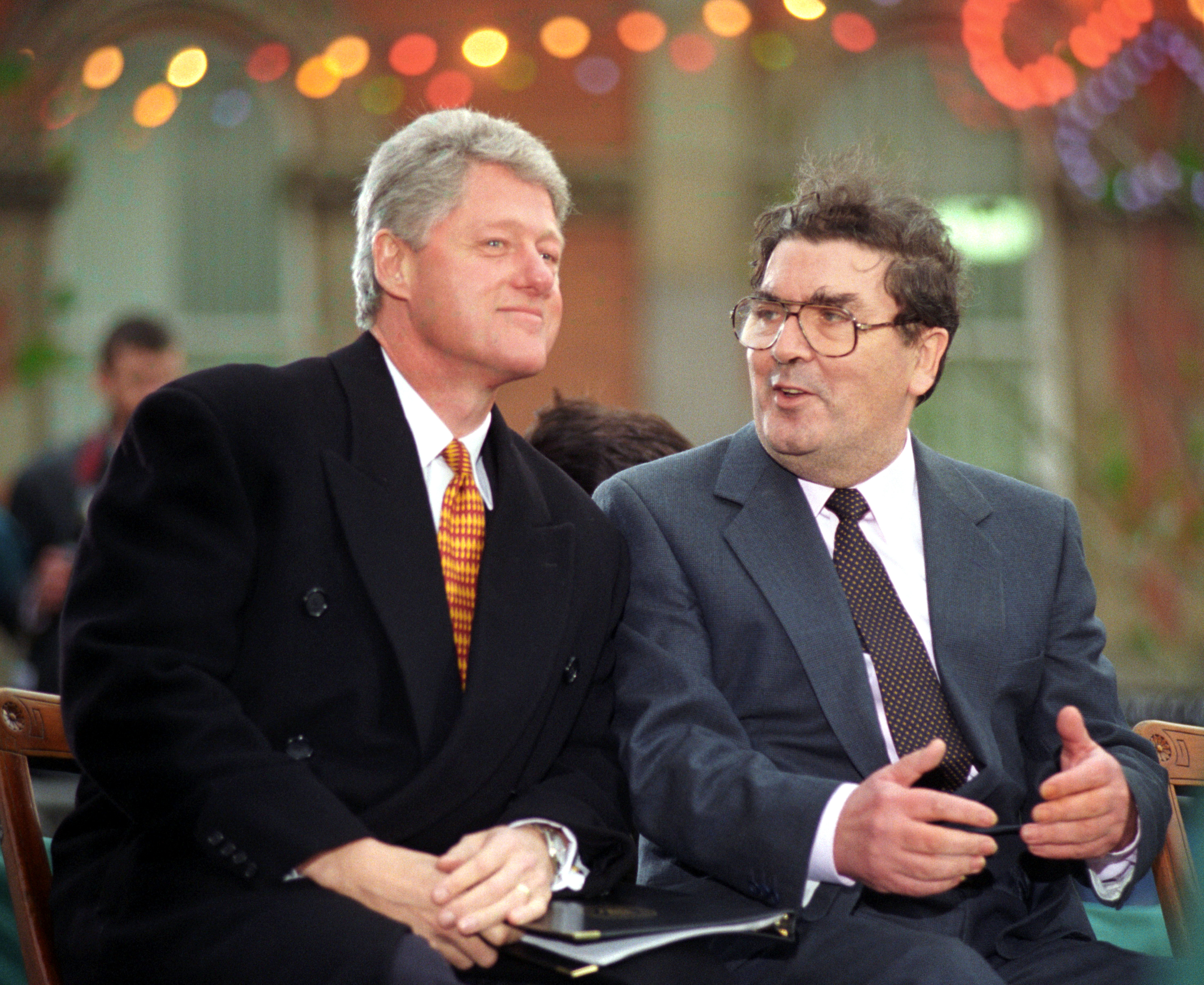
US president Bill Clinton merged with popular culture in the 1990s. Bill Clinton played saxophone on The Arsenio Hall Show, and the Clinton–Lewinsky scandal made TV headlines in 1998.

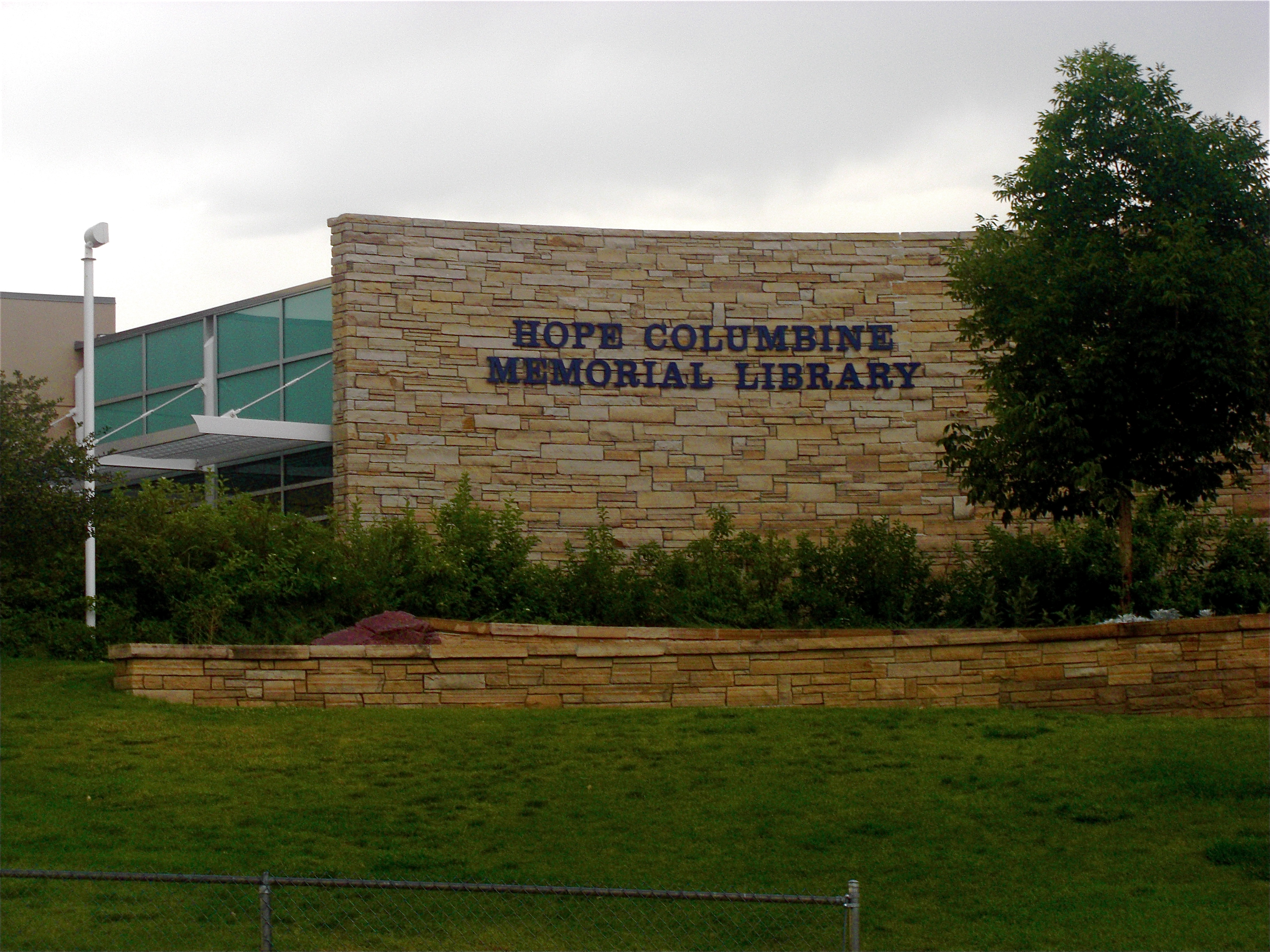
The Columbine High School massacre damaged popular culture in the late 1990s. It caused greater sensitivity toward violence in media and youth culture; following the event, video games like Doom and artists such as Marilyn Manson faced backlash and increased scrutiny.

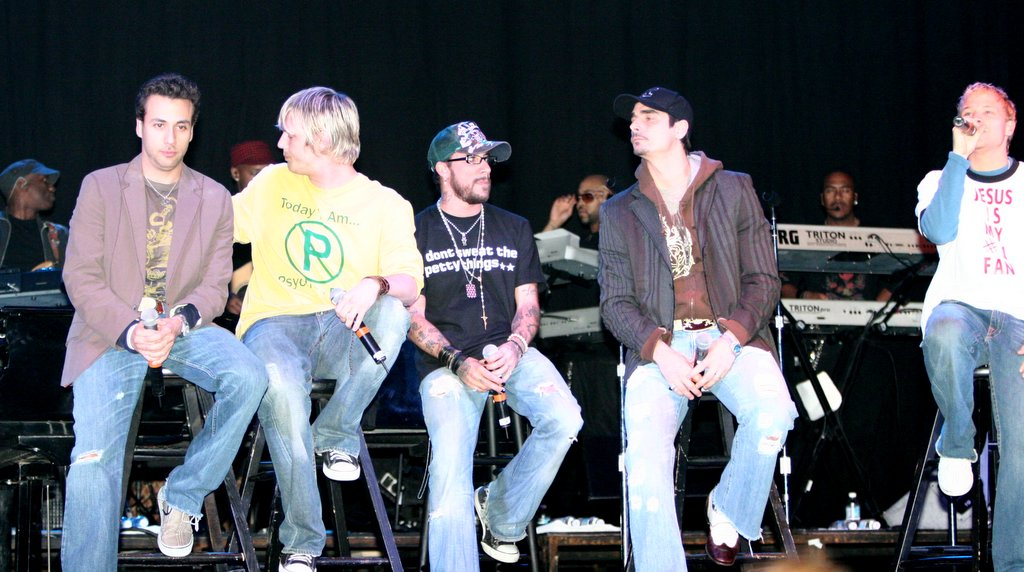
Boy bands and girl groups became a global pop cultural phenomenon in the 1990s, with groups such as Backstreet Boys, NSYNC, Boyz II Men, Spice Girls, TLC, and Destiny's Child dominating charts and shaping teen pop culture worldwide.

=== Film ===
Live-action films

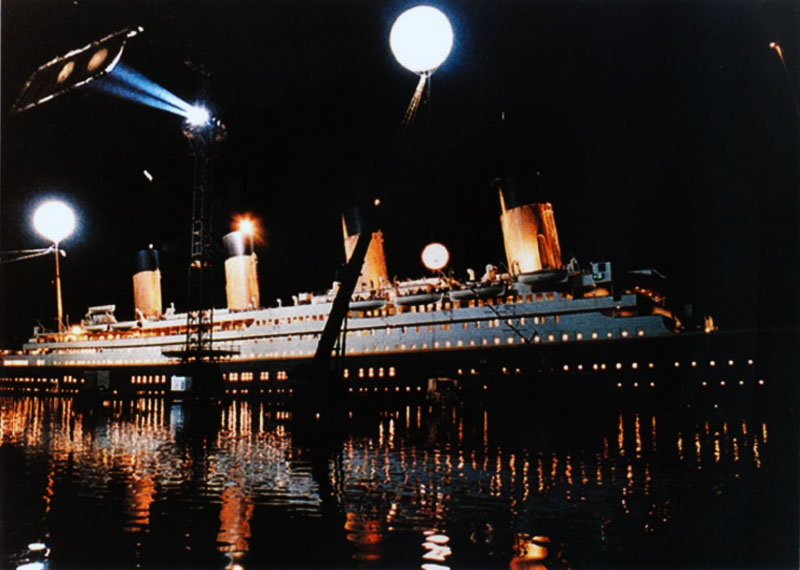
The highest-grossing film of the decade was James Cameron's Titanic (1997), which remains one of the highest-grossing films of all time.

Dogme 95 became an important European artistic motion picture movement by the decade's end. Also in 1998, Titanic by director James Cameron (released in late 1997) became the highest-grossing film of all time, grossing over $1.8 billion worldwide. It would hold this record for over a decade until 2010 when James Cameron's Avatar (released in December 2009), took the title.

Crime films were also extremely popular during the 1990s and garnered several awards throughout the decade, such as Goodfellas, Pulp Fiction, L.A. Confidential, Heat, Boyz n the Hood, Se7en, Thelma & Louise, Fargo, A Simple Plan, and many others. Live-action films featuring computer-animated characters became popular, with films such as Casper, 101 Dalmatians, Men in Black and Stuart Little proving financially successful. Live-action/traditional cel animated film featuring traditional characters like Space Jam, Cool World, and The Pagemaster were prevalent as well.

In Argentina, a new artistic movement appeared in the filmmaking scene, called Nuevo Cine Argentino, which would be greatly influential in Latin American cinema.

Animated films

In 1994, former Disney employee Jeffrey Katzenberg founded DreamWorks SKG, which would produce its first two animated films: The Prince of Egypt and Antz which were both aimed more at adults than children and were both critically and commercially successful. Toy Story, the first full-length CGI movie, made by Pixar, was released in 1995 and revolutionized animated films. In 1998, with the release of DreamWorks's Antz and Pixar's A Bug's Life, the rivalry between DreamWorks and Pixar began between the studios due to the similarities between both films.

Meanwhile, films by Pixar's parent company, Disney became popular once more when the studio returned to making family-oriented animated musical films. Disney Animation was navigating the "Disney Renaissance", through both animated theatrical films and animated television series on the Disney Channel (owned by Walt Disney Television). The "Disney Renaissance" began with The Little Mermaid in 1989 and ended with Tarzan in 1999. Films of this era include Beauty and the Beast, Aladdin, The Nightmare Before Christmas, The Lion King, Pocahontas, The Hunchback of Notre Dame, Hercules, and Mulan.

Japanese anime films remained popular throughout the 1990s with the release of Studio Ghibli films such as Only Yesterday, Porco Rosso, Pom Poko, Whisper of the Heart, Princess Mononoke (which became the highest-grossing anime film at the time) and My Neighbors the Yamadas. Other significant anime films which gained cult status include Roujin Z, Ramayana: The Legend of Prince Rama, Patlabor 2: The Movie, Ninja Scroll, Street Fighter II: The Animated Movie, Ghost in the Shell, Memories, The End of Evangelion, Perfect Blue, and Jin-Roh: The Wolf Brigade.

The British stop-motion animated film series Wallace & Gromit, which started in 1989 with A Grand Day Out, became a cultural phenomenon in this decade, and now has been expanded with over four short films and two feature-length films.

Other significant animated films have also gained cult status, such as The Iron Giant, Batman: Mask of the Phantasm, A Goofy Movie, Cats Don't Dance, All Dogs Go to Heaven 2, Wakko's Wish, Ferngully: The Last Rainforest, Anastasia, and Kirikou and the Sorceress.

Other successful films

Critically acclaimed and financially successful films that came out in this decade included Jurassic Park (which was the highest-grossing film at the time, before beaten by Titanic that same decade), Forrest Gump, The Mask, Meteo, Total Recall, Reservoir Dogs, Face/Off, The Matrix, Trainspotting, Braveheart, Home Alone, Mrs. Doubtfire, Babe, Terminator 2: Judgment Day, The Silence of the Lambs, the Before trilogy (starting in 1995 with Before Sunrise), Philadelphia, Ghost, The Sixth Sense, Scream, Misery, Wayne's World, Austin Powers: International Man of Mystery, Men in Black, Independence Day, Groundhog Day, Clerks, Saving Private Ryan, Schindler's List, Edward Scissorhands, Leaving Las Vegas, The Addams Family, Clueless, The Big Lebowski, Four Weddings and a Funeral, Jerry Maguire, Mission: Impossible, Notting Hill, The Green Mile, and The Shawshank Redemption.

In India, Shah Rukh Khan got rise in his stardom by Dilwale Dulhania Le Jayenge, Kuch Kuch Hota Hai, and Dil To Pagal Hai.

==== Award winners ====
Award	1990	1991	1992	1993	1994	1995	1996	1997	1998	1999
Academy Award for Best Picture winners	Dances with Wolves	The Silence of the Lambs	Unforgiven	Schindler's List	Forrest Gump	Braveheart	The English Patient	Titanic	Shakespeare in Love	American Beauty
Palme d'Or winners at the Cannes Film Festival	Wild at Heart	Barton Fink	The Best Intentions	Farewell My Concubine and The Piano	Pulp Fiction	Underground	Secrets & Lies	Taste of Cherry and The Eel	Eternity and a Day	Rosetta
César Award for Best Film winners	Cyrano de Bergerac	Tous les matin du monde	Savage Nights	Smoking/No Smoking	Wild Reeds	La haine	Ridicule	Same Old Song	The Dreamlife of Angels	Venus Beauty Institute
Golden Lion winners at the Venice Film Festival	Rosencrantz & Guildenstern Are Dead	Close to Eden	The Story of Qiu Ju	Short Cuts and Three Colours: Blue	Vive L'Amour and Before the Rain	Cyclo	Michael Collins	Fireworks	The Way We Laughed	Not One Less

==== Highest-grossing ====
The 25 highest-grossing films of the decade are:

Films by worldwide box office
No.	Title	Year	Box office
1	Titanic	1997	$1,850,197,130
2	Star Wars: Episode I – The Phantom Menace	1999	$924,305,084
3	Jurassic Park	1993	$912,667,947
4	Independence Day	1996	$817,400,891
5	The Lion King	1994	$763,455,561
6	Forrest Gump	1994	$677,387,716
7	The Sixth Sense	1999	$672,806,292
8	The Lost World: Jurassic Park	1997	$618,638,999
9	Men in Black	1997	$589,390,539
10	Armageddon	1998	$553,709,788
11	Terminator 2: Judgment Day	1991	$516,950,043
12	Ghost	1990	$505,702,588
13	Aladdin	1992	$504,050,219
14	Twister	1996	$494,471,524
15	Toy Story 2	1999	$487,059,677
16	Saving Private Ryan	1998	$481,840,909
17	Home Alone	1990	$476,684,675
18	The Matrix	1999	$463,517,383
19	Pretty Woman	1990	$463,406,268
20	Mission: Impossible	1996	$457,696,391
21	Tarzan	1999	$448,191,819
22	Mrs. Doubtfire	1993	$441,286,195
23	Dances with Wolves	1990	$424,208,848
24	The Mummy	1999	$415,933,406
25	The Bodyguard	1992	$410,945,720

=== Music ===
Music artists and genres

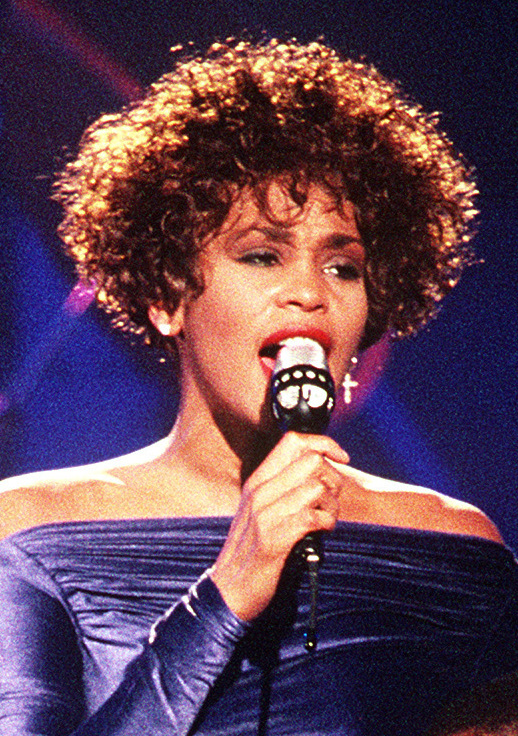
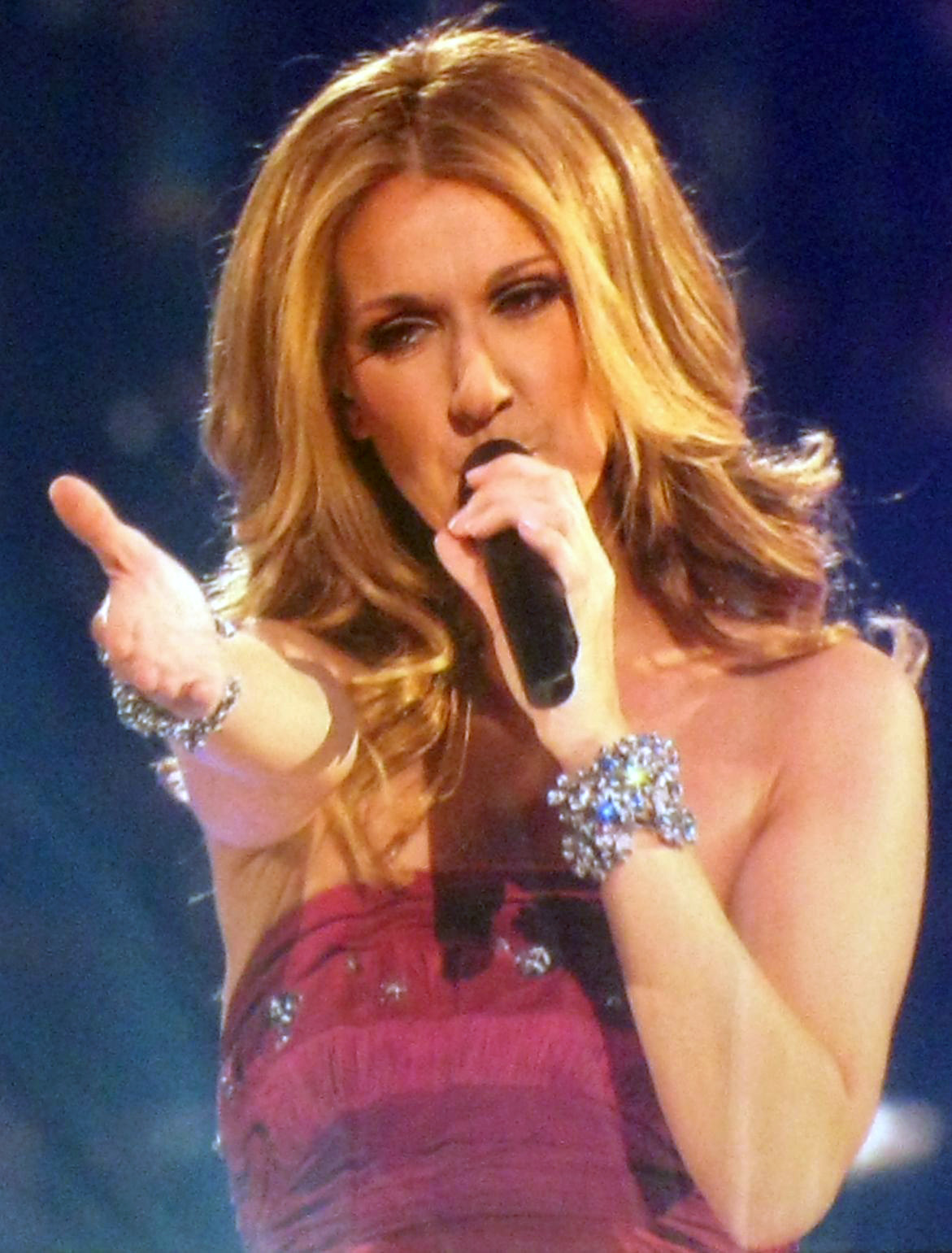
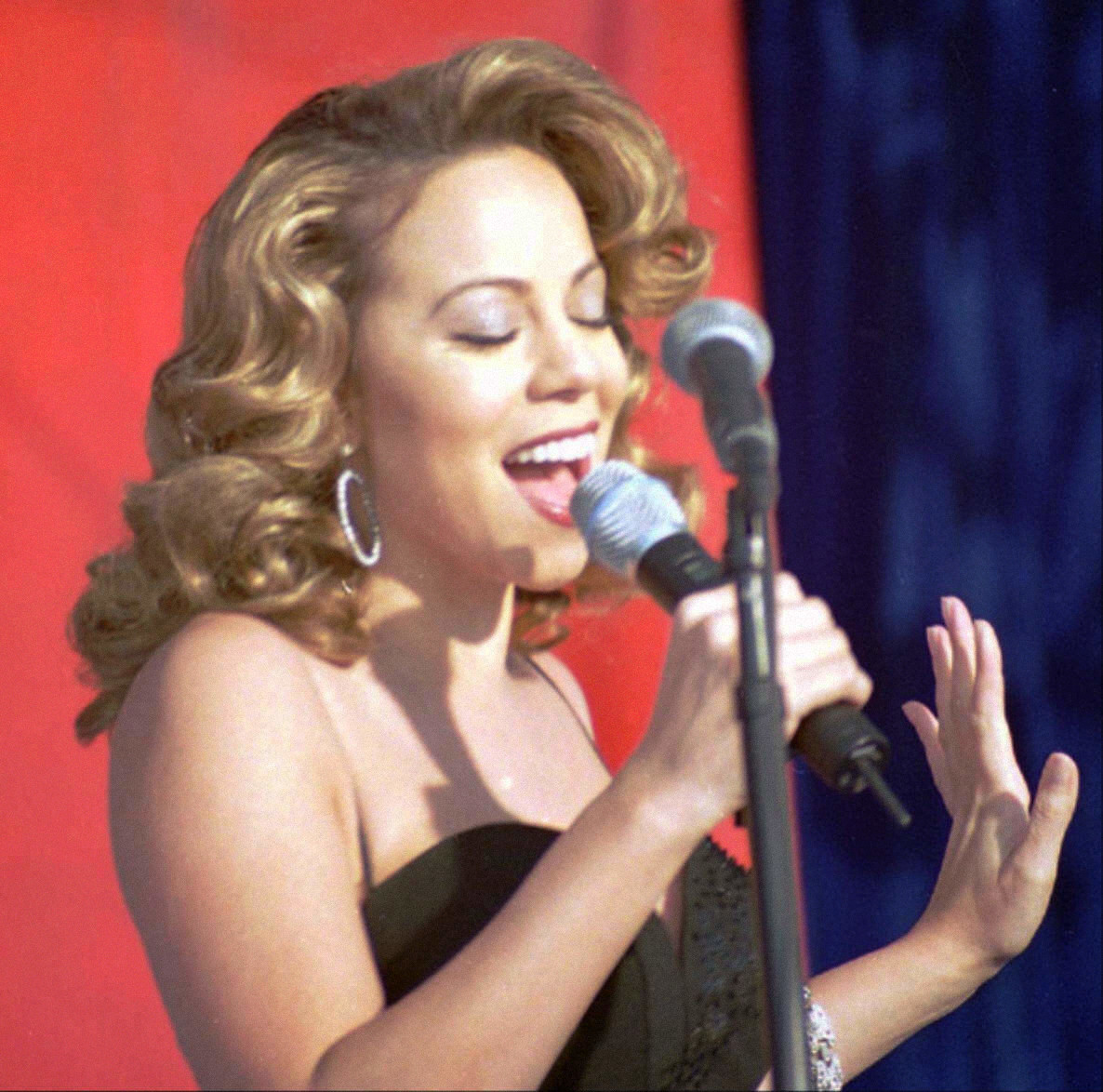
Whitney Houston (left), Celine Dion (center) and Mariah Carey (right) were three of the highest-selling and most popular female artists of the decade.

Music marketing became more segmented in the 1990s, as MTV gradually shifted away from music videos and radio splintered into narrower formats aimed at various niches. However, the 1990s are perhaps best known for grunge, gangsta rap, R&B, teen pop; Eurodance, electronic dance music, the renewed popularity of punk rock from the band Green Day and their 1994 album Dookie (which would also help create a new genre pop-punk), and for the entrance of alternative rock into the mainstream. U2 was one of the most popular 1990s bands; their groundbreaking Zoo TV and PopMart tours were the top-selling tours of 1992 and 1997, respectively. Glam metal died out in the music mainstream by 1991. Grunge became popular in the early 1990s due to the success of Nirvana's Nevermind, Pearl Jam's Ten, Alice in Chains' Dirt, Soundgarden's Badmotorfinger and Stone Temple Pilots' Core. pop-punk also becomes popular with such artists as Green Day, Blink-182, Weezer, Social Distortion, the Offspring, Bad Religion, NOFX and Rancid. Other successful alternative acts included Red Hot Chili Peppers, R.E.M., Nickelback, Creed, Radiohead, Gin Blossoms, Soul Asylum, Goo Goo Dolls, Third Eye Blind, Faith No More, the Smashing Pumpkins, Live, Everclear, Bush, Screaming Trees and Ween.

Rappers Salt-n-Pepa continued to have hit songs until 1994. Dr. Dre's 1992 album The Chronic provided a template for modern gangsta rap, and gave rise to other emerging artists of the genre, including Snoop Dogg. Due to the success of Death Row Records and Tupac Shakur, West Coast gangsta rap commercially dominated hip-hop during the early-to-mid 1990s, along with Bad Boy Records and the Notorious B.I.G. on the East Coast. Hip-hop became the best-selling music genre by the mid-1990s.

1994 became a breakthrough year for punk rock in California, with the success of bands like Bad Religion, Social Distortion, Blink-182, Green Day, the Offspring, Rancid and similar groups following. This success would continue to grow over the next decade. The 1990s also became the most important decade for ska punk/reggae rock, with the success of many bands like Smash Mouth, Buck-O-Nine, Goldfinger, Less Than Jake, the Mighty Mighty Bosstones, Murphy's Law, No Doubt, Reel Big Fish, Save Ferris, Sublime and Sugar Ray.

The rave movement that emerged in the late 1980s continued to grow in popularity. This movement spawned genres such as Intelligent dance music and Drum and bass. The latter is an offshoot of jungle techno and breakbeat. Popular artists included Moby, Fatboy Slim, Björk, Aphex Twin, Orbital, the Orb, the Chemical Brothers, Basement Jaxx, Todd Terry, 808 State, Primal Scream, the Shamen, the KLF and the Prodigy.

The rise of industrial music, somewhat a fusion of synthpop and heavy metal, rose to worldwide popularity with bands like Godflesh, Nine Inch Nails, Rammstein, Ministry and Marilyn Manson. Groove metal was born through the efforts of Pantera, whose seventh studio album Far Beyond Driven (1994) was notable for going number one on Billboard 200. Another heavy metal subgenre called nu metal, which mixed metal with hip-hop influences, became popular with bands like Korn, Slipknot and Limp Bizkit selling millions of albums worldwide. Metallica's 1991 eponymous album Metallica is the best-selling album of the SoundScan era, while extreme metal acts such as Death, Mayhem, Darkthrone, Emperor, Cannibal Corpse and others experienced popularity throughout the decade.

The theatrical traveling Irish dance troupe Riverdance was first performed as a seven-minute interval act for the 1994 Eurovision Song Contest in Dublin, originally led by Michael Flatley and Jean Butler, to a thunderous ovation. The following year, it quickly evolved into one of the most successful full-fledged stage shows in history.

==== Country music ====
In the 1990s, country music became a worldwide phenomenon thanks to Billy Ray Cyrus, Shania Twain and Garth Brooks. The latter enjoyed one of the most successful careers in popular music history, breaking records for both sales and concert attendance throughout the decade. The RIAA has certified his recordings at a combined (128× platinum), denoting roughly 113 million United States shipments.

Other artists that experienced success during this time included Clint Black, Sammy Kershaw, Aaron Tippin, Travis Tritt, Suzy Bogguss, Alan Jackson, Lorrie Morgan and the newly formed duo of Brooks & Dunn. George Strait, whose career began in the 1980s, also continued to have widespread success in this decade and beyond. Female artists such as Reba McEntire, Faith Hill, Martina McBride, Deana Carter, LeAnn Rimes and Mary Chapin Carpenter all released platinum-selling albums in the 1990s. Rimes, a teenager at the time, spawned a "teen movement" in country music; with fellow teen artists Lila McCann, Jessica Andrews, Billy Gillman, and others following suit; a phenomenon that hasn't been duplicated since Tanya Tucker and Marie Osmond in the early 1970s. The Dixie Chicks became one of the most popular country bands in the 1990s and early 2000s. Their 1998 debut album Wide Open Spaces went on to become certified 12× platinum, while their 1999 album Fly went on to become 10× platinum.

==== R&B and related ====
Contemporary quiet storm and R&B continued to be quite popular among adult audiences originating from African-American communities, which began during the 1980s. Popular African-American contemporary R&B artists included Mariah Carey, D'Angelo, Lauryn Hill, Whitney Houston, Brandy, En Vogue, TLC, Destiny's Child, Toni Braxton, Boyz II Men, Dru Hill, Vanessa Williams and Janet Jackson.

Also, British R&B artists Sade (active since 1982), Des'Ree and Mark Morrison became quite popular during this decade.

==== Music from around the world ====
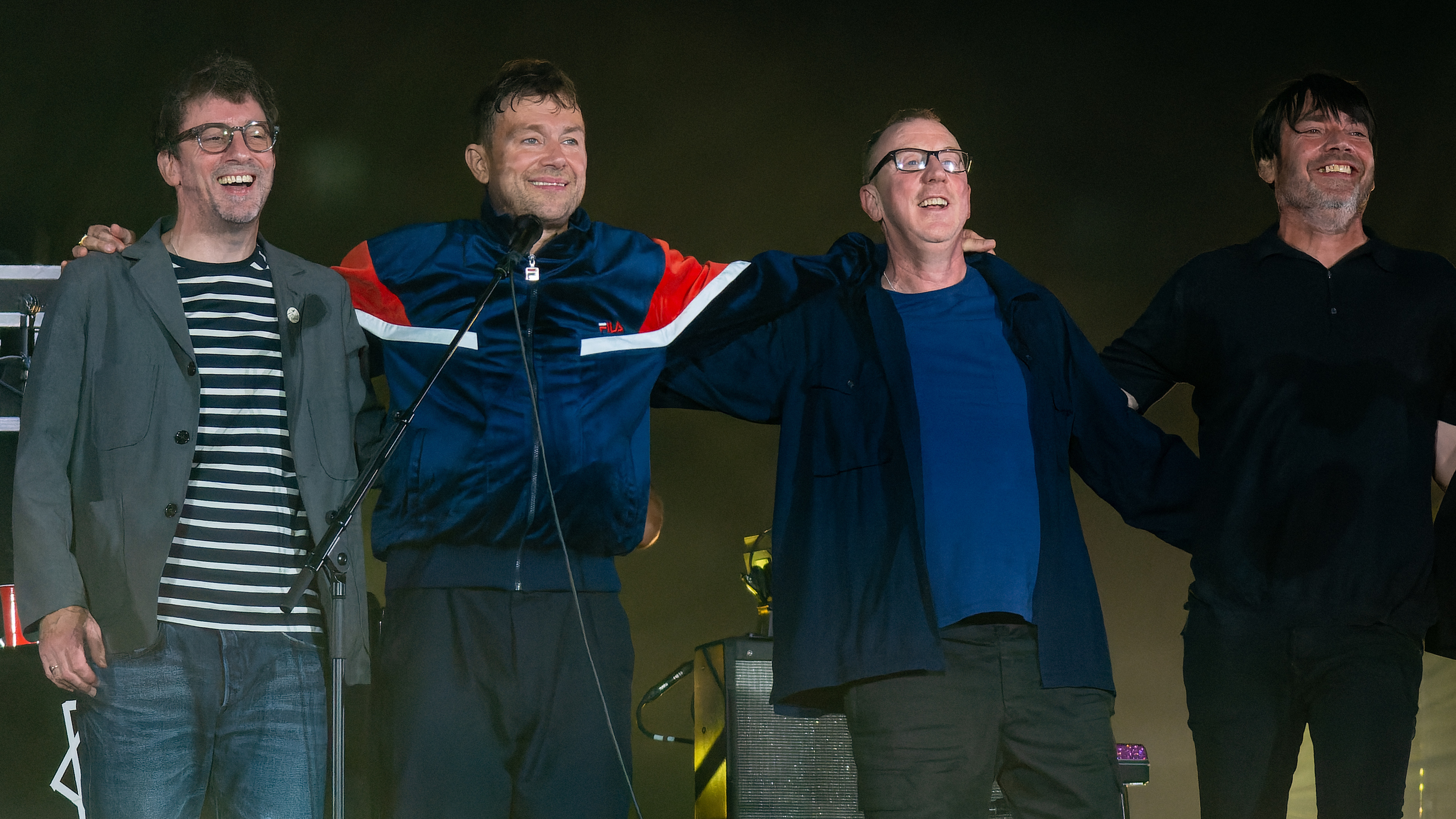
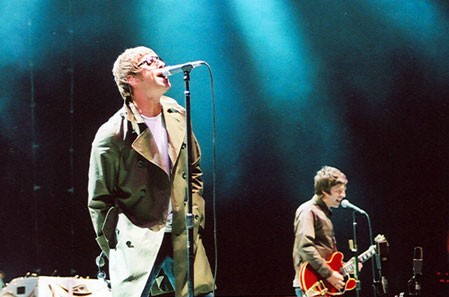
Blur (left) and Oasis (right) became some of the most internationally popular Britpop bands of the decade.

In the United Kingdom, the alternative rock Britpop genre emerged as part of the more general Cool Britannia culture, with Pulp (already founded in 1978), Blur (active since 1988), Ocean Colour Scene (since 1989), Suede (existing since 1989 with hiatus), the Verve (1990–1993), Oasis (formed in 1991), Elastica (1992–2001), Ash (since 1992), Supergrass (1993–2022 with hiatus) and Kula Shaker (since 1995) serving as popular examples of this emergence.

The impact of boy band pop sensation Take That, founded in 1990, lead to the formation of other boy bands in the UK and Ireland, such as East 17 in 1991 and the Irish boy band Boyzone in 1993. Female pop icons Spice Girls took the world by storm since 1994, becoming the most commercially successful British group since the Beatles, the Rolling Stones and Led Zeppelin. Their global success brought about a widespread scene of teen pop acts around the world such as All Saints, Backstreet Boys (both formed in 1993) as well as American acts as Hanson (from 1992), NSYNC (1995–2002, reunited 2003), Britney Spears and Christina Aguilera who came to prominence into the new millennium.

Many musicians from Canada, such as Celine Dion, Maestro Fresh Wes, Snow, Barenaked Ladies, Shania Twain, Len, Sarah McLachlan, and Alanis Morissette became known worldwide.

Argentine rock music continues to be commercially successful and culturally relevant throughout the 1990s. Soda Stereo, the most famous rock band of Latin America reached new heights with their album Canción Animal in 1990, which contained great anthems of Argentine Rock, such as De Música Ligera, Té para tres and Entre Caníbales. Many bands of the Underground scene become mainstream, such as hard rock band, La Renga, post-punk band Los Redondos and alternative rock band Babasónicos. Also Charly García and Fito Páez would continue their successful solo careers, the latter with one of hist most famous albums, Circo Beat, and his classic song, Mariposa Tecknicolor.

In 1991, Australian children's music group The Wiggles appeared.

In Japan, the J-pop genre emerged as part of the more general Heisei Power cultural movement, with B'z, Mr. Children, Southern All Stars, Yumi Matsutoya, Dreams Come True, Glay, Zard, Hikaru Utada, Namie Amuro, SMAP, Chage and Aska, L'Arc-en-Ciel, Masaharu Fukuyama, Globe, Tube, Kome Kome Club, Maki Ohguro, Tatsuro Yamashita, TRF, Speed, Wands, and Field of View became more popular for Japanese youth audiences during the Lost Decades.

The Tibetan Freedom Concert, organized by Beastie Boys and the Milarepa Fund, brought 120,000 people together in the interest of increased human rights and autonomy for Tibet from China.

==== Controversies ====
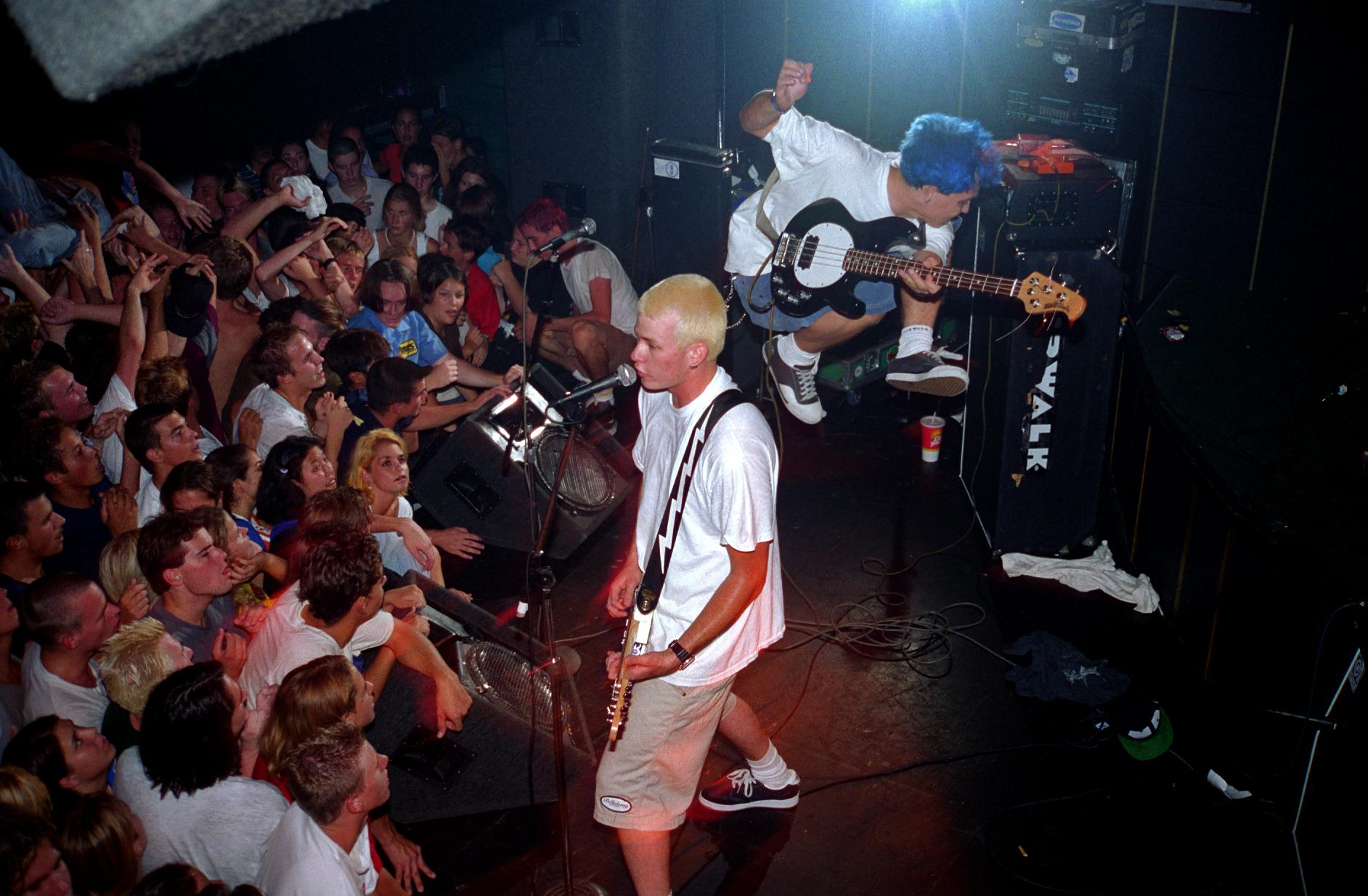
Blink-182 performing in 1995, whose 1999 album Enema of The State became a pivotal moment for contemporary pop punk

Controversy surrounded the Prodigy with the release of the track "Smack My Bitch Up". The National Organization for Women (NOW) claimed that the track was "advocating violence against women" due to the song's lyrics, which are themselves sampled from Ultramagnetic MCs' "Give the Drummer Some". The music video (directed by Jonas Åkerlund) featured a first-person POV of someone going clubbing, indulging in drugs and alcohol, getting into fist fights, abusing women and picking up a prostitute. At the end of the video, the camera pans over to a mirror, revealing the subject to be a woman.

==== Deaths of artists ====
1991 also saw the death of Queen frontman Freddie Mercury from AIDS-related pneumonia. Next to this Kurt Cobain, Selena, Eazy-E, Tupac Shakur and the Notorious B.I.G. were the most publicized music-related deaths of the decade, in 1994, 1995, 1996, and 1997 respectively. Richey Edwards of Manic Street Preachers was publicized in the media in 1991 following an incident involving Steve Lamacq backstage after a live show, in which Edwards carved '4 Real' into his arm. Edwards' disappearance in 1995 was highly publicized. He is still missing but was presumed dead in 2008.

=== Television ===
Comedies and sitcoms

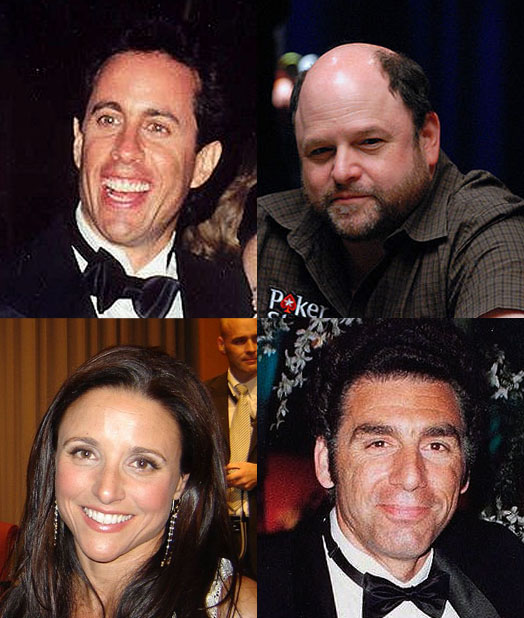
Seinfeld, which premiered on NBC in 1989, became a commercial success and cultural phenomenon by 1993.

TV shows, mostly sitcoms, were popular with American audiences. Series such as Roseanne, Coach, Empty Nest, Mr. Belvedere, 227, Cheers, The Cosby Show, Growing Pains, Night Court, The Hogan Family, Murphy Brown, Full House, The Wonder Years, A Different World, Amen, ALF, Perfect Strangers, Married... with Children, Family Matters, Charles in Charge, Saved by the Bell, My Two Dads, Major Dad, Newhart, Dear John, Designing Women, The Golden Girls, Who's the Boss?, Head of the Class, and Seinfeld, which premiered in the eighties, and Frasier, a spin-off of the 1980s hit Cheers were viewed throughout the 1990s.

These sitcoms, along with Friends, That '70s Show, Ellen, The Fresh Prince of Bel-Air, Nurses, Living Single, Step by Step, NewsRadio, Blossom, The King of Queens, Fired Up, Jesse, Parker Lewis Can't Lose, For Your Love, The Steve Harvey Show, The Larry Sanders Show, Sex and the City, Arliss, Dream On, Grace Under Fire, Mad About You, Sabrina the Teenage Witch, The Naked Truth, The Jeff Foxworthy Show, The Jamie Foxx Show, Smart Guy, The Wayans Bros., Malcolm & Eddie, Clueless, Moesha, The Parent 'Hood, Unhappily Ever After, Roc, Martin, Hangin' with Mr. Cooper, In Living Color, Sister, Sister, Boy Meets World, Ned and Stacey, Becker, Veronica's Closet, Two Guys and a Girl, The Drew Carey Show, Wings, The John Larroquette Show, Caroline in the City, Sports Night, Home Improvement, Will & Grace, Evening Shade, Cosby, Spin City, The Nanny, 3rd Rock from the Sun, Suddenly Susan, Cybill, Just Shoot Me!, Everybody Loves Raymond, and Dharma & Greg, as well as British sitcoms like Mr. Bean, Father Ted, Absolutely Fabulous, I'm Alan Partridge, and One Foot in the Grave, from the 90s turned TV in new directions and defined the humor of the decade.

Furthermore, Saturday Night Live experienced a new era of success during the 1990s, launching the careers of popular comedians and actors such as Chris Farley, Dana Carvey, Phil Hartman, Adam Sandler, Will Ferrell, Molly Shannon, Mike Myers, Chris Rock, Norm Macdonald, David Spade, Cheri Oteri and others.

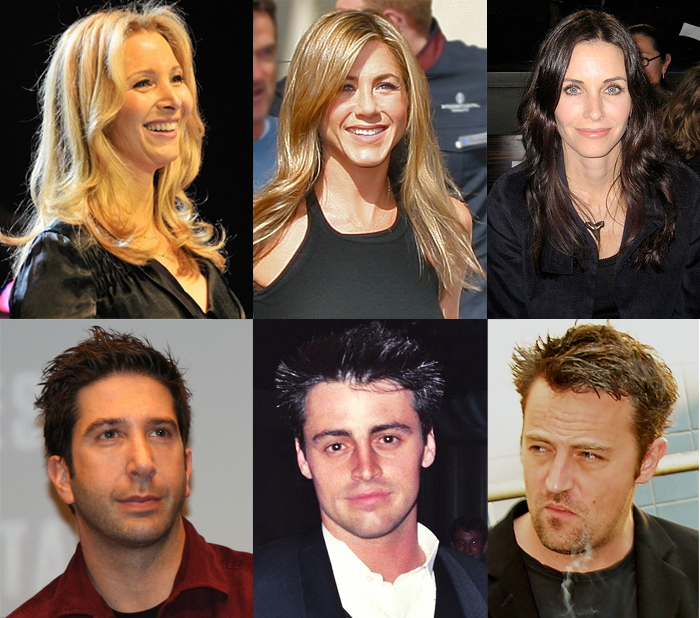
Friends, which premiered on NBC in 1994 became one of the most popular sitcoms of all time. From left, clockwise: Lisa Kudrow, Jennifer Aniston, Courteney Cox, Matthew Perry, Matt LeBlanc, and David Schwimmer, the six main actors of Friends.

Drama shows

1993 saw the debut of the medical–mystery drama, Diagnosis Murder, a comeback vehicle for Dick Van Dyke, who guest-starred on an episode of its parent series, Jake and the Fatman, where the show got off to a rocky start and became one of television's long-running mysteries, that lasted until its cancellation in 2001. It was one of a number of shows that made CBS popular with a distinctly older audience than its competitors, with a lineup consisting mainly of murder mysteries, westerns and religious dramas, such as Walker, Texas Ranger, Touched by an Angel, Murder, She Wrote and Dr. Quinn, Medicine Woman.

Medical dramas started to return to television in the 1990s after the end of St. Elsewhere in 1988. In 1994, ER, which originally starred Anthony Edwards, Noah Wyle and George Clooney, was instantly a domestic and international success, lasting until 2009 and spawning similar series to compete against it, such as the more soap opera-esque Grey's Anatomy (2005–present), and the short lived Medicine Ball (1995). It was one of the many successful shows during that period (as well as sitcoms such as Seinfeld and Friends) which made NBC the most-watched channel in the United States. This show launched the career of George Clooney. That same year, Chicago Hope, that starred Héctor Elizondo, Mandy Patinkin and Adam Arkin, was also a popular series for CBS, lasting between 1994 and 2000.

Crime drama and police detective shows returned to the spotlight after soap operas died down. After the successful debuts of Law & Order, NYPD Blue, Homicide: Life on the Street, Fox debuted New York Undercover, which starred Malik Yoba and Micheal DeLorenzo, is notable for featuring two people of color in the main roles. Nash Bridges, a comeback vehicle for Don Johnson, lasting six seasons (1996–2001), dealt with escapist entertainment instead of tackling social issues.

Beverly Hills, 90210 ran on Fox from 1990 to 2000. It established the teen soap genre, paving the way for Dawson's Creek, Felicity, Party of Five, and other shows airing later in the decade, and into the 2000s. The show was then remade and renamed simply 90210 and premiered in 2008. Beverly Hills, 90210, and its spin-off Melrose Place also became a popular TV show throughout the 1990s. Baywatch became the most-watched TV show in history at its peak and influenced pop culture.

Sex and the City's portrayal of relationships and sexuality caused controversy and acclaim, leading to a new generation of sexually progressive television shows in the 2000s, such as Queer as Folk and The L Word.

Other television shows and genres

Fantasy and science fiction shows were popular on television, with NBC airing SeaQuest DSV beginning in 1993, which made Jonathan Brandis a popular teen idol, but was cancelled after three seasons. The 1990s saw a multitude of Star Trek content: in 1993, following the success of Star Trek: The Next Generation, Paramount released the follow-up shows Star Trek: Deep Space Nine (1993–1999) and Star Trek: Voyager (1995–2001). Touched By an Angel, broadcast by CBS in 1994, was intended as the comeback vehicle of Della Reese, and also launched the career of Roma Downey. It wasn't an immediate success and was cancelled, but was revived the following year due to a fan letter-writing campaign, and ran for eight more seasons. At the end of the decade, the fantasy drama series Charmed gained a cult following and helped popularize the WB.

In 1993, one of the last westerns to air on television was Walker, Texas Ranger, a crime drama starring Chuck Norris as the title character. Running for nine seasons, the show tackled a wide variety of subjects and was one of few shows to feature an actor performing karate stunts at that time.

Reality television was not an entirely new concept (An American Family aired on PBS in 1973) but proliferated for Generation X audiences with titles such as Judge Judy, Eco-Challenge, and Cops.

The 1990s saw the debut of live-action children's programs such as the educational Bill Nye the Science Guy and Blue's Clues as well as the superhero show Mighty Morphin Power Rangers, the latter becoming a pop culture phenomenon along with a line of action figures and other toys by Japanese toy manufacturer Bandai. This can also be said for the British pre-school series Teletubbies, which was a massive hit loved by very young children. It also saw long time running shows such as Barney & Friends and the continuation of Sesame Street, both of which would continue in the following decades and so.

During the mid-1990s, two of the biggest professional wrestling companies: World Championship Wrestling and World Wrestling Federation were in a ratings battle that was called the Monday Night War (1995–2001). Each company fought to draw more viewers to their respective Monday night wrestling show. The "War" ended in 2001 when WWE bought WCW. In November 2001, there was a Winner Takes All match with both companies in a Pay-Per-View called Survivor Series. WWF won the match, putting an end to WCW.

The late 1990s also saw the evolution of a new TV genre: primetime game shows, popularized by the quiz show Who Wants to Be a Millionaire?, hosted originally by Chris Tarrant on ITV in the United Kingdom and Regis Philbin on ABC in the United States, as well as other first-run game shows aired in prime time on the newly launched Game Show Network.

Many Argentine TV shows and soap operas were greatly successful abroad, such as Muñeca Brava, which would become immensely successful in Russia, and would be exported to over 80 countries, and translated to over 50 languages. Similarly, Chiquititas was broadcast in 36 countries in Latin America, Europe and Asia.

Animated shows

The animated sitcom, The Simpsons, premiered on Fox in December 1989 and became a domestic and international success in the 1990s. The show has since aired more than 800 episodes and has become an institution of pop culture. In addition, it has spawned the adult-oriented animated sitcom genre, inspiring more adult-oriented animated shows such as Beavis and Butt-Head (1993–1997), Daria (1997–2001), along with South Park and Family Guy, the latter two of which began in 1997 and 1999, respectively, and continue to air new episodes through the 2000s and into the 2020s.

Cartoons produced in the 1990s are sometimes referred to as the "Renaissance Age of Animation" for cartoons in general, particularly for American animated children's programs. Disney Channel, Nickelodeon (owned by Viacom, now Paramount Global) and Cartoon Network (owned by Warner Bros. Discovery) would dominate the animated television industry. These three channels are considered the "Big Three", of children's entertainment, even today, but especially during the 1990s.

Family animation studios such as Warner Bros. Animation would create shows like Tiny Toon Adventures, Animaniacs and its spin-off series Pinky and the Brain, and the start of the Warner Bros. Animation Looney Tunes Marvel and Marvel Productions with shows such as Taz-Mania, The Plucky Duck Show, X-Men, Iron Man, Fantastic Four, Free Willy, Spider-Man, The Sylvester & Tweety Mysteries, Bugs 'n' Daffy, The Incredible Hulk, Waynehead, Road Rovers, Men in Black: The Series, Channel Umptee-3, Histeria!, Pinky, Elmyra & the Brain, and Detention, and the start of the DC Animated Universe with shows such as Batman: The Animated Series, and Superman: The Animated Series, as well as syndicated shows like Phantom 2040. Nickelodeon's first three animated series known as Nicktoons (Doug, Rugrats, The Ren & Stimpy Show) all premiered on the same day in 1991 along with shows such as Rocko's Modern Life, Hey Arnold!, CatDog, The Wild Thornberrys, and in 1999 saw the debut of Nickelodeon's well known animated comedy series SpongeBob SquarePants. Cartoon Network would create shows like Dexter's Laboratory, The Powerpuff Girls, Ed, Edd n Eddy, Johnny Bravo, and Courage the Cowardly Dog. Disney Channel would make shows like Recess, Pepper Ann, Darkwing Duck, TaleSpin, and Gargoyles. The 1990s also saw other animated shows such as Oggy and the Cockroaches, Bobby's World, Arthur, Alfred J. Kwak, Moomin, Little Rosey, Adventures from the Book of Virtues, Merrie Melodies Starring Bugs Bunny & Friends, Dumb and Dumber, Freakazoid!, The Mask: Animated Series, Spider!, Dragon Tales, Little Shop, Little Dracula, Wild West C.O.W.-Boys of Moo Mesa, Mega Man, Where on Earth Is Carmen Sandiego?, Raw Toonage, Timon & Pumbaa, Marsupilami, The Little Mermaid, Bonkers, Aladdin, The Shnookums & Meat Funny Cartoon Show, Mighty Ducks: The Animated Series, Quack Pack, Hercules, Fievel's American Tails, Eek! the Cat, Goof Troop, Jungle Cubs, Nightmare Ned, PB&J Otter, Mickey Mouse Works, Piggsburg Pigs!, Agro's Cartoon Connection, The Pirates of Dark Water, ToonHeads, Delfy and His Friends, Problem Child, The Twisted Tales of Felix the Cat, Back to the Future, Beethoven, The Spooktacular New Adventures of Casper, Wing Commander Academy, The New Woody Woodpecker Show, Tom & Jerry Kids, Captain Planet and the Planeteers, Bill & Ted's Excellent Adventures, The Adventures of Don Coyote and Sancho Panda, Wake, Rattle, and Roll, Midnight Patrol: Adventures in the Dream Zone, Yo Yogi!, Fish Police, The Addams Family, Droopy, Master Detective, SWAT Kats: The Radical Squadron, Cave Kids, The Real Adventures of Jonny Quest, The Moxy Show, The Brothers Grunt, Wolves, Witches and Giants, Robin, Bruno the Kid, Dennis and Gnasher, Dog City, The Little Lulu Show, C Bear and Jamal, Space Goofs, Franklin, Noah's Island, Hurricanes, ReBoot, Beast Wars: Transformers, Beast Machines: Transformers, Donkey Kong Country, Shadow Raiders, Voltron: The Third Dimension, Monster by Mistake, Pippi Longstocking, Cartoon Sushi, The Adventures of Blinky Bill, Victor & Hugo: Bunglers in Crime, Avenger Penguins, Fantomcat, The Foxbusters, Darkstalkers, Street Fighter, Spicy City, Princess Gwenevere and the Jewel Riders, Mortal Kombat: Defenders of the Realm, Earthworm Jim, Widget, Samurai Pizza Cats, Kyatto Ninden Teyandee, Exosquad, Blazing Dragons, Dino Babies, Fox's Peter Pan & the Pirates, Attack of the Killer Tomatoes, Biker Mice From Mars, Zazoo U, 64 Zoo Lane, Redwall, The Tick, Cybersix, The Baby Huey Show, The New Adventures of He-Man, The Wizard of Oz , Toonsylvania, Mega Babies, The Secret Files of the Spy Dogs, The Pink Panther, All Dogs Go to Heaven: The Series, Robocop: Alpha Commando, The Lionhearts, Tabaluga, The Super Mario Bros. Super Show!, Captain N: The Game Master, The Adventures of Super Mario Bros. 3, Super Mario World, Adventures of Sonic the Hedgehog, Wish Kid, Mr. Bogus, Hammerman, Sonic the Hedgehog, Double Dragon, Mighty Max, Street Sharks, Captain Simian & the Space Monkeys, Extreme Dinosaurs, The Wacky World of Tex Avery, Mummies Alive!, Extreme Ghostbusters, The Adventures of Sam & Max: Freelance Police, Sonic Underground, Widget the World Watcher, Meena, Ketchup: Cats Who Cook, The Dreamstone, The Legends of Treasure Island, Mad Jack the Pirate, Albert the Fifth Musketeer, and Simsala Grimm, achieve popularity.

Japanese anime was popular in the 1980s and expanded to a worldwide audience by the 1990s for its expansive spectrum of story subjects and themes not limited to comedy and superhero action found in the US. It featured well-produced, well-written, visual, and story content that came to showcase animation's potential for emotional and intellectual depth and integrity on par with live action media to its viewers. Anime expanded to older and adult audiences in the medium of animation. Anime shows such as Sailor Moon, Digimon, Pokémon, Tenchi Muyo!, Berserk, Trigun, Cowboy Bebop, Gundam Wing, Neon Genesis Evangelion, Ranma ½, Yu Yu Hakusho, Slayers, Rurouni Kenshin, Initial D, Gunsmith Cats, Slam Dunk, Nadia: The Secret of Blue Water, Outlaw Star, to anime movies such as Akira, Vampire Hunter D, Jin-Roh: The Wolf Brigade, My Neighbor Totoro, Princess Mononoke, Castle in the Sky, The Castle of Cagliostro, and imports by various distributors such as Viz, AnimEigo, Central Park Media, A.D. Vision, Pioneer Entertainment, Media Blasters, Manga Entertainment, and Celebrity, helped begin the mid to late 1990s and turn of the millennium introductory anime craze in the US, and the Cartoon Network anime programming block Toonami in 1997.

=== Fashion and body modification ===
Significant fashion trends of the 1990s include:

- Earth and jewel tones, as well as an array of minimalist style and design influences, characterize the 1990s, a stark contrast to the camp and bombast seen in the brightly colored fashion and design trends of the 1980s.
- The Rachel, Jennifer Aniston's hairstyle on the hit TV show Friends, became a cultural phenomenon, with millions of women copying it worldwide.
- The Hi-top fade was trendy among African Americans in the early 1990s.
- The Curtained Haircut increased in popularity in fashion and culture among teenage boys and young men in the 1990s, mainly after it was popularized in the film Terminator 2: Judgment Day by the actor Edward Furlong.
- The model 1300 Wonderbra style has a resurgence of popularity in Europe in 1992, which kicks off an international media sensation, the 1994 return of "The Wonderbra" brand, and a spike in the push-up, plunge bras around the world.
- Additional fashion trends of the 1990s include the Tamagotchi, Rollerblades, Pogs and Dr. Martens shoes.
- Bleached-blond hair became very popular in the late 1990s, as were men with short hair with the bangs "flipped up."
- The 1990s also saw the return of the 1970s teenage female fashion with long, straight hair and denim hot pants.
- Beverly Hills, 90210 sideburns also became popular in the early and mid-1990s.
- Slap bracelets were a popular fad among children, preteens, and teenagers in the early 1990s and were available in a wide variety of patterns and colors. Also popular among children were light-up sneakers, jelly shoes, and shoelace hair clips.
- The Grunge hype at the beginning of the decade popularized flannel shirts among both genders during the 1990s.
- Heroin chic appeared sporadically across film, fashion models and grunge music, but gave way by end of the US recession and the emergence of internet "geek" culture (a sassy tech-literate style centered on web searching and drinking coffee).
- Grunge- and hip-hop-inspired anti-fashion saw an expansion of the slouchy, casual styles of past decades, mostly seen in baggy and distressed jeans, cargo shorts and pants, baseball caps (often worn backward), chunky sneakers, oversized sweatshirts, and loose-fitting tees with grandiloquent graphics and logos.
- Svelte fashion was also popular from the beginning of the 1990s and into the 2000s, as the new millennium began. The rivalry of sloppy grunge fashion versus more expensive clothing made for fitter bodies was a repeat of the rock versus disco rivalry of a decade ago. Nineties fashion became darker, slinkier, and more futuristic-looking clothing in the late 1990s, with Keanu Reeves in The Matrix as a style icon.
- Tattoos and piercings became part of the mainstream aesthetic. American model Christy Turlington revealed her belly button piercing at a fashion show in London in 1993. In the late 1990s, some females got lower back tattoos and men opted for tribal style arm bands or back pieces.
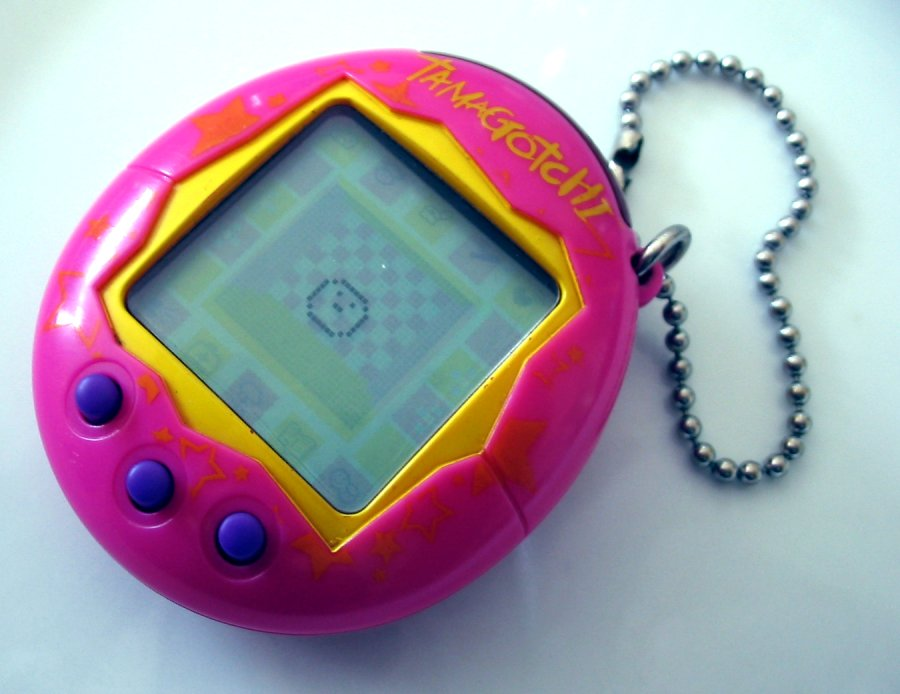
Tamagotchi and Furby were popular iconic toys among children around the world in the 1990s, also in the 2000s

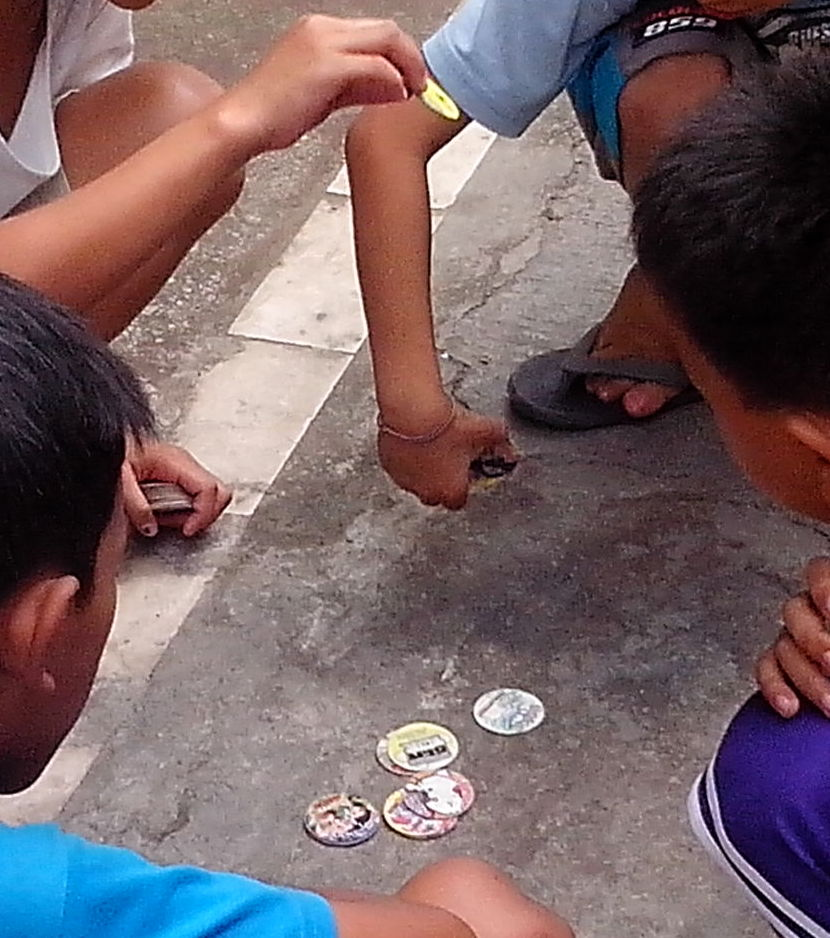
Pogs was a popular street game among children around the world during the decade

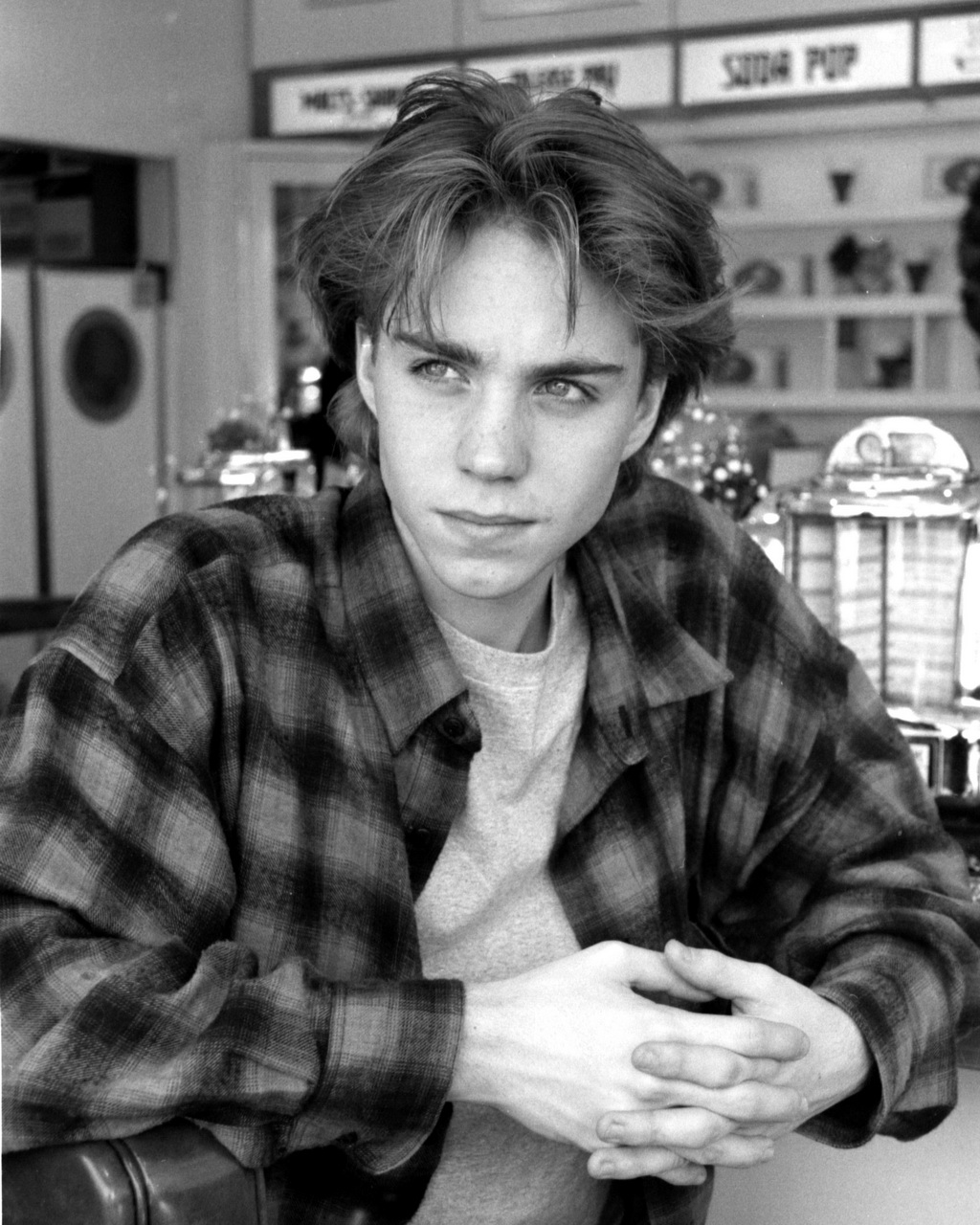
Grunge-style fashion became a trend in the 1990s, modeled here by teen actor Jonathan Brandis

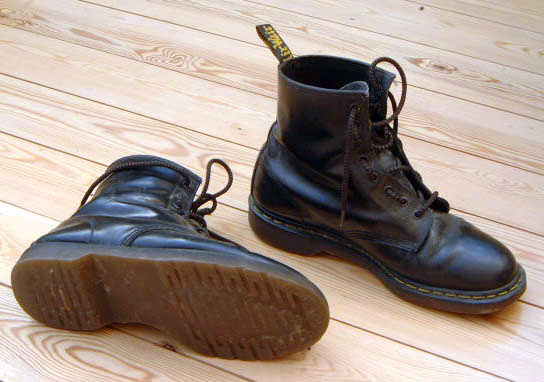
Boots like Timberlands and Dr. Martens became popular. Hiking, motorcyclist and safety boots were all part of the general trend towards grunge fashion in footwear

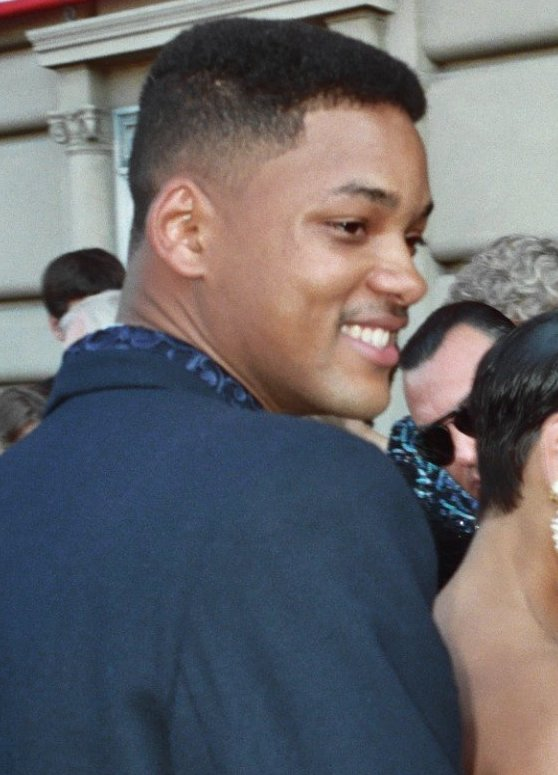
Will Smith donning a Hi-top fade in 1993, a popular hairstyle of the early decade

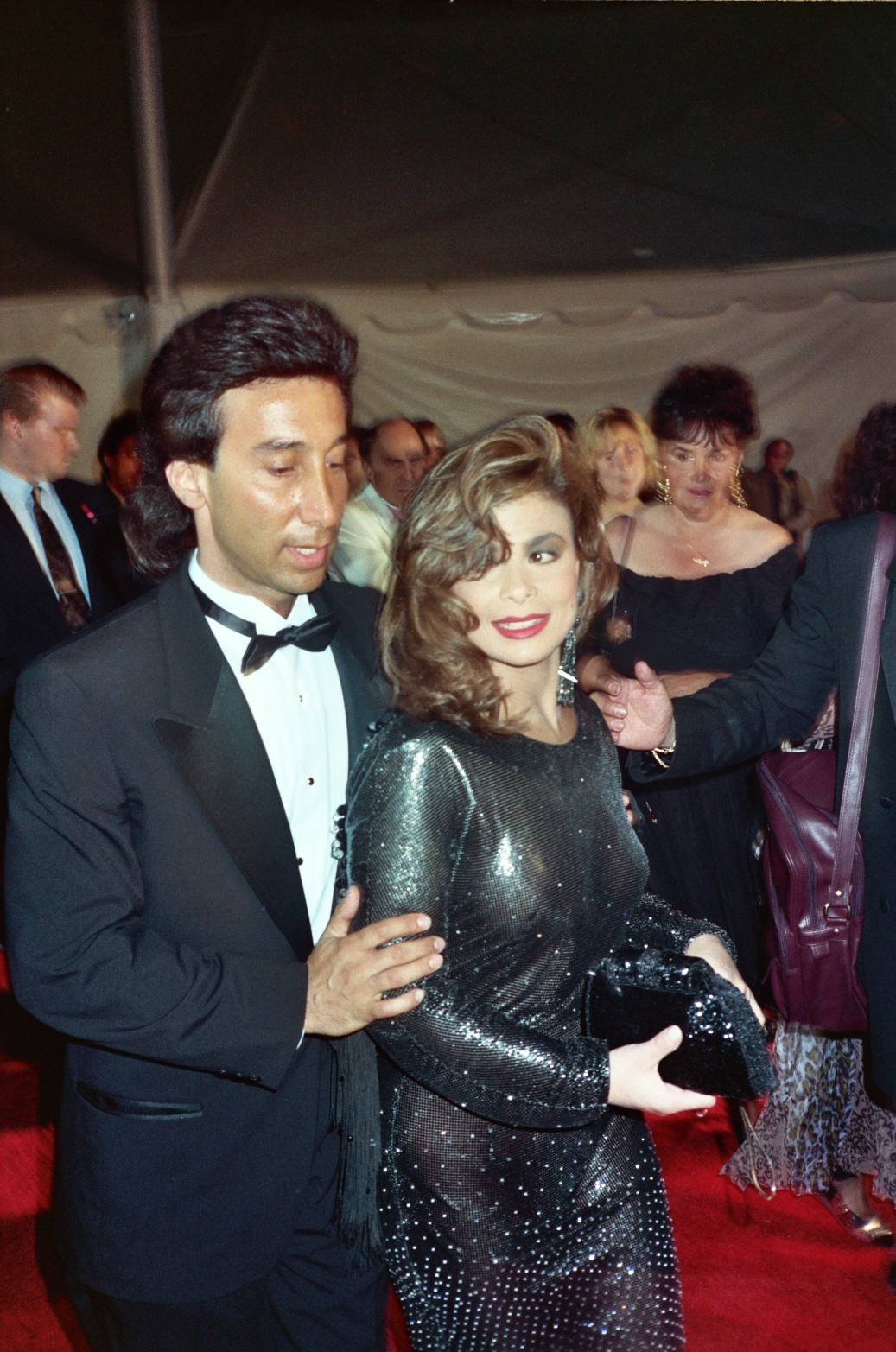
Paula Abdul modeling a semi-transparent black dress, curled hair and smoky eye makeup at the 62nd Academy Awards in 1990

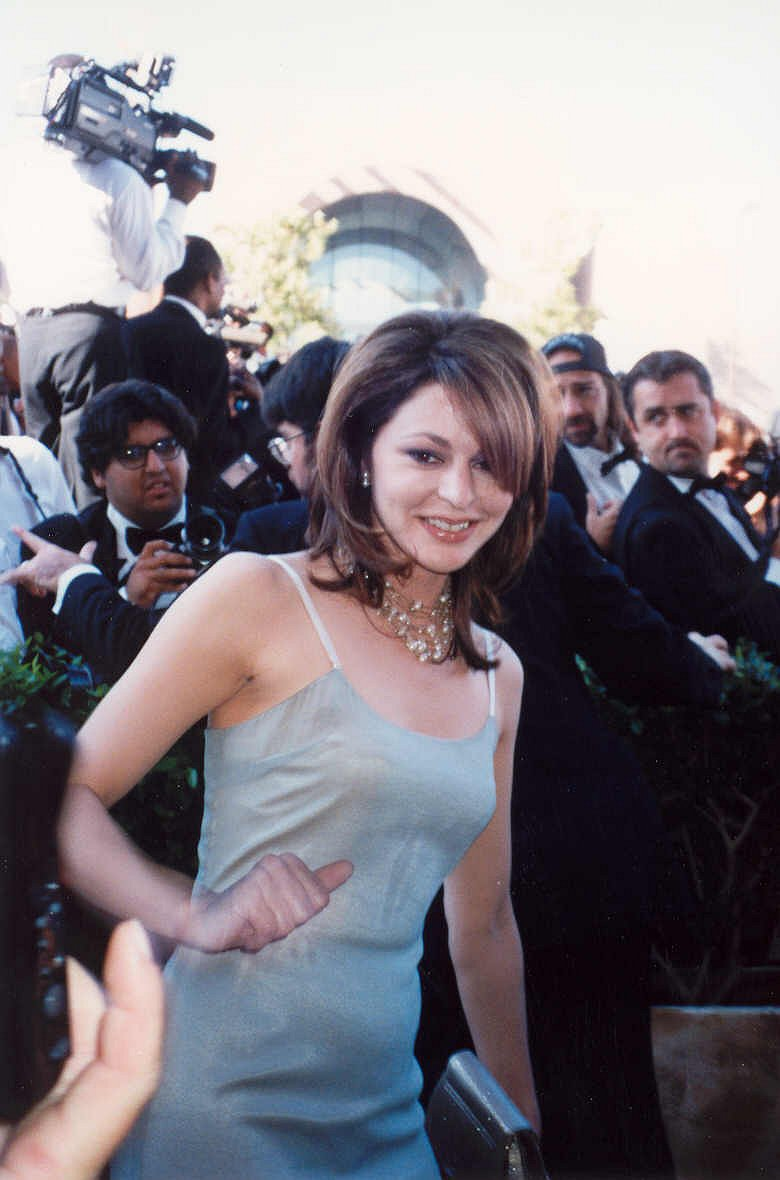
Jane Leeves sporting a slip dress in 1995

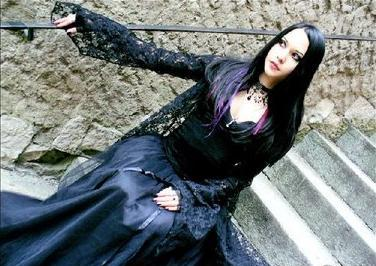
Example of late 1990s goth fashion

=== Video games ===
Video game consoles

Video game consoles released in this decade include the Super Nintendo Entertainment System, Neo Geo, Atari Jaguar, 3DO, Sega Saturn, PlayStation, Nintendo 64 and Dreamcast. Portable video game consoles include the Game Gear, Atari Lynx and Game Boy Color. Super Mario World was the decade's best-selling home console video game, while Pokémon Red and Blue was the decade's best-selling portable video game; Super Mario 64 was the decade's best-selling fifth-generation video game, while Street Fighter II was the decade's highest-grossing arcade video game.

The console wars, primarily between Sega (Mega Drive, marketed as the Sega Genesis in North America, introduced in 1988) and Nintendo (Super NES, introduced in 1990), sees the entrance of Sony with the PlayStation in 1994, which becomes the first successful CD-based console (as opposed to cartridges). By the end of the decade, Sega's hold on the market becomes tenuous after the end of the Saturn in 1999 and the Dreamcast in 2002.

Arcade games rapidly decreased in popularity, mainly due to the dominance of handheld and home consoles.

Video games

Mario as Nintendo's mascot finds a rival in Sega's Sonic the Hedgehog with the release of Sonic the Hedgehog on the Sega Mega Drive/Genesis in 1991. Sonic the Hedgehog would go on to become one of the most successful video game franchises of the decade and of all time.

Notable video games of the 1990s include: Super Metroid, Metal Gear Solid, Super Mario World, Doom, Donkey Kong Country, Donkey Kong 64, Pokémon Red and Blue Versions, Super Smash Bros., Pokémon Yellow Version, GoldenEye 007, Super Mario 64, The Legend of Zelda: Ocarina of Time, Gran Turismo, Mario Kart 64, Half-Life, Super Mario Kart, Radiant Silvergun, Rayman, Gunstar Heroes, Banjo-Kazooie, Soulcalibur, Star Fox series, Tomb Raider series, Final Fantasy, Sonic the Hedgehog series, Story of Seasons series, Tony Hawk's series, Crash Bandicoot series, Metal Slug series, Resident Evil series, Street Fighter II, Spyro the Dragon series, Commander Keen series, Test Drive series, Dance Dance Revolution series, Monkey Island series, Dune series, Mortal Kombat series, Warcraft series, Duke Nukem 3D, Tekken series, EarthBound, Fallout: A Post Nuclear Role Playing Game, and StarCraft.

Sony's PlayStation becomes the top-selling video game console and changes the standard media storage type from cartridges to compact discs (CDs) in home consoles. Crash Bandicoot is released on 9 September 1996, becoming one of the most successful platforming series for the Sony PlayStation. Spyro The Dragon, released on 9 September 1998, also became a successful platforming series. Tomb Raider's Lara Croft became a video game sex symbol, becoming one of the most recognizable figures in the entertainment industry throughout the late 1990s.

Pokémon enters the world scene with the release of the original Pokémon Red and Pokémon Green for Game Boy in Japan in 1996, later changed to Pokémon Red and Pokémon Blue for worldwide release in 1998. It soon becomes popular in the United States and Canada, creating the term Pokémania, and is adapted into a popular anime series and trading card game, among other media forms.

Resident Evil is released in 1996 and Resident Evil 2. Both games became the most highly acclaimed survival-horror series on the PlayStation at the time it was released. It is credited with defining the survival horror genre and with returning zombies to popular culture, leading to a renewed interest in zombie films by the 2000s.

Video game genres

3D graphics become the standard by the decade's end. Although FPS games had long since seen the transition to full 3D, other genres began to copy this trend by the end of the decade. The most notable first shooter games in the 1990s are GoldenEye 007 and Tom Clancy's Rainbow Six.

The violent nature of fighting games like Capcom's Street Fighter II, Sega's Virtua Fighter, and Midway's Mortal Kombat prompted the video game industry to accept a game rating system. Hundreds of knockoffs are widely popular in the mid-to-late 1990s. Doom (1993) bursts onto the world scene, and instantly popularizes the FPS genre. Half-Life (1998) builds upon this, using gameplay without levels and an immersive first-person perspective. Half-Life became one of the most popular FPS games in history.

The real-time strategy (RTS) genre is introduced in 1992 with the release of Dune II. Warcraft: Orcs & Humans (1994) popularizing the genre, and Command & Conquer and Warcraft II: Tides of Darkness in 1995, setting up the first major real-time strategy competition and popularizing multiplayer capabilities in RTS games. StarCraft in 1998 becomes the second best-selling computer game of all time. It remains among the most popular multiplayer RTS games today, especially in South Korea. Homeworld in 1999 becomes the first successful 3D RTS game. The rise of the RTS genre is often credited with the fall of the turn-based strategy (TBS) genre, popularized with Civilization in 1991. Final Fantasy was introduced (in North America) in 1990 for the NES and remains among the most popular video game franchises, with many new titles to date and more in development, plus numerous spin-offs, sequels, films and related titles. Final Fantasy VII, released in 1997, especially popularized the series.

Massively multiplayer online role-playing games (MMORPGs) see their entrance with Ultima Online in 1997. However, they do not gain widespread popularity until EverQuest and Asheron's Call in 1999. MMORPGs become among the most popular video game genres until the 2010s.

The best-selling games of the 1990s are listed below (note that some sources disagree on particular years):

- 1990: Super Mario World
- 1991: Sonic the Hedgehog
- 1992: Super Mario Land 2: 6 Golden Coins
- 1993: Super Mario All-Stars
- 1994: Donkey Kong Country
- 1995: Super Mario World 2: Yoshi's Island or Mortal Kombat 3
- 1996: Pokémon Red and Blue or Super Mario 64
- 1997: Gran Turismo or Mario Kart 64
- 1998: Pokémon Yellow or The Legend of Zelda: Ocarina of Time
- 1999: Pokémon Gold and Silver or Donkey Kong 64
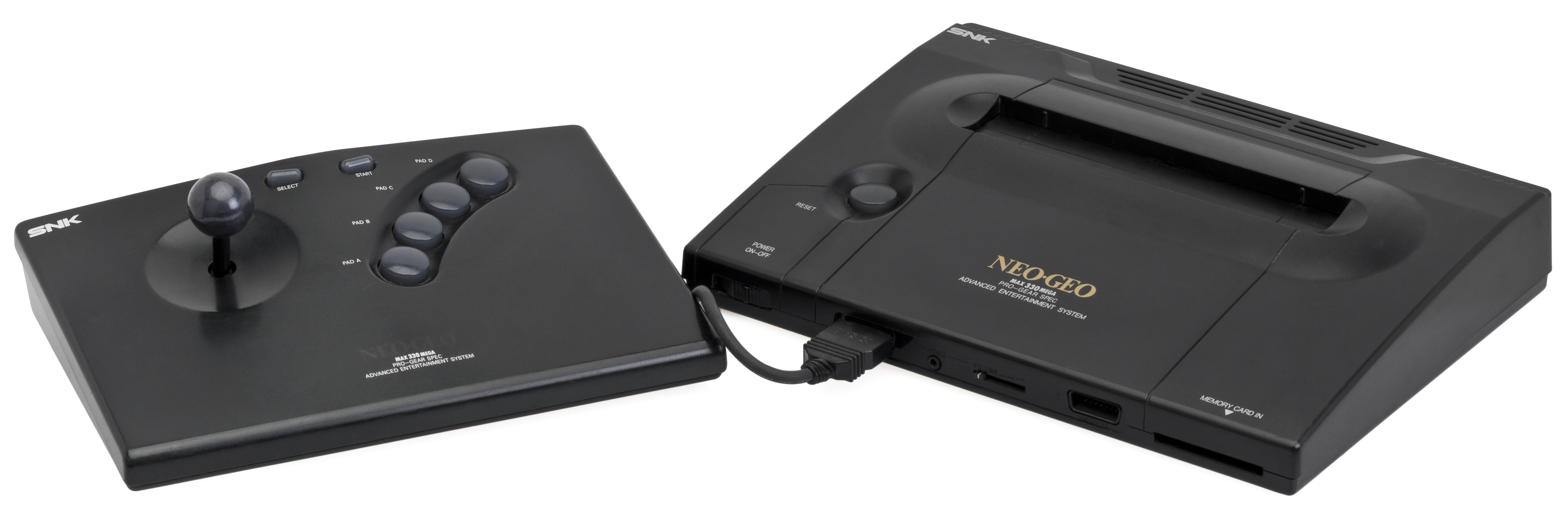
Neo Geo AES released in 1990. The console was supposed to bring an experience similar to Arcade games to be played.

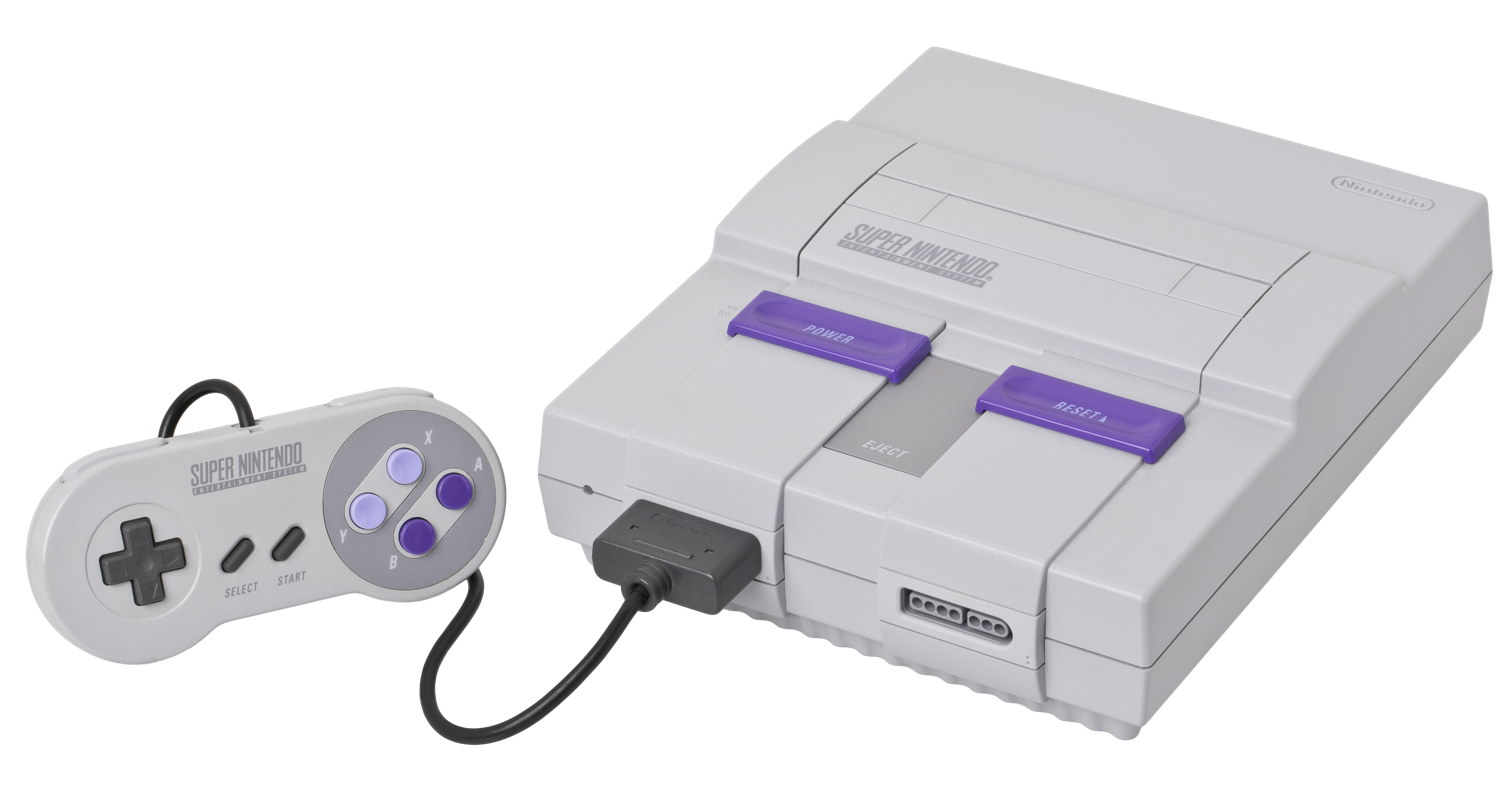
The Super Nintendo Entertainment System (SNES) released in 1990 and is the successor to the Nintendo Entertainment System

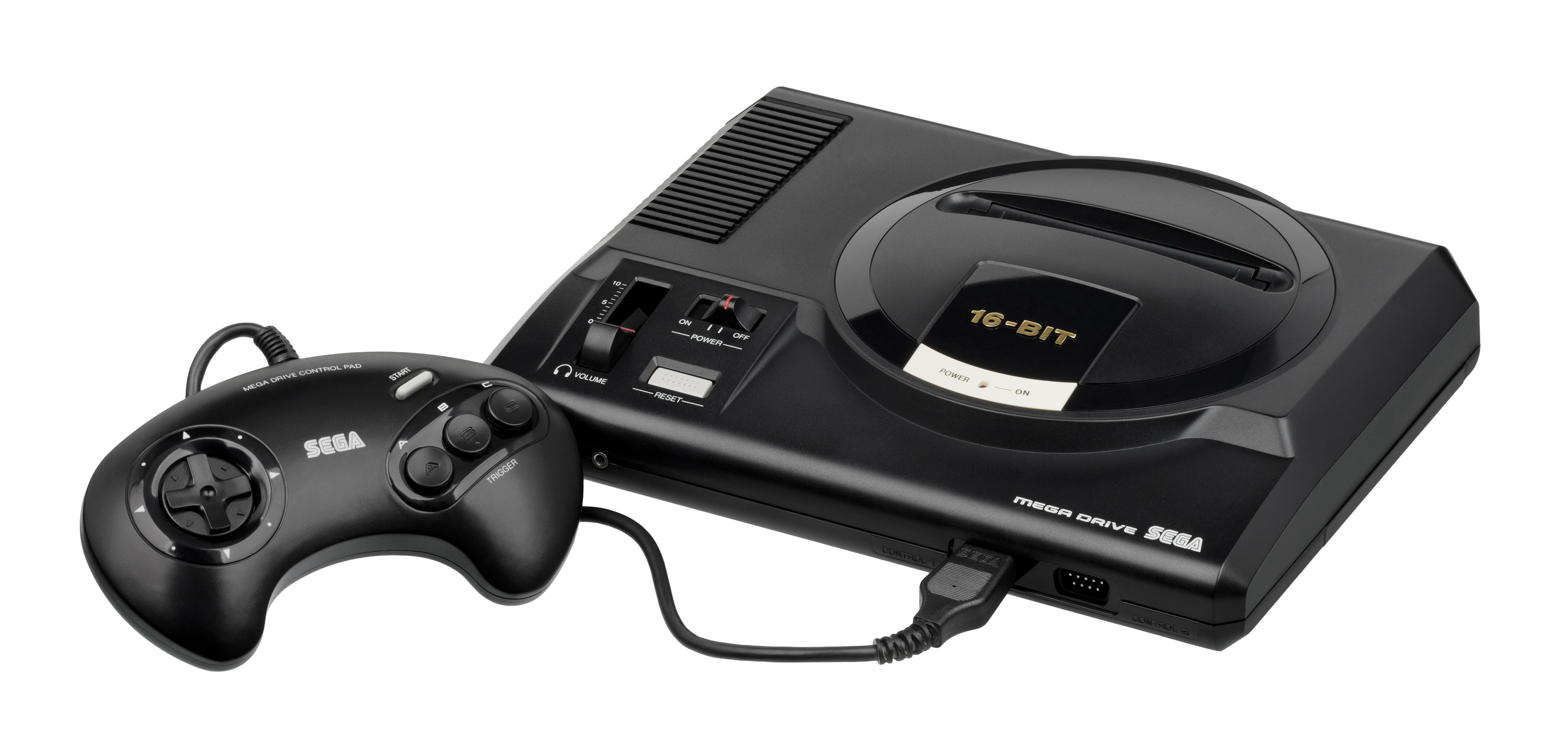
The European PAL version of the Mega Drive launched in 1990, later becoming the highest-selling fourth-gen console in Europe.

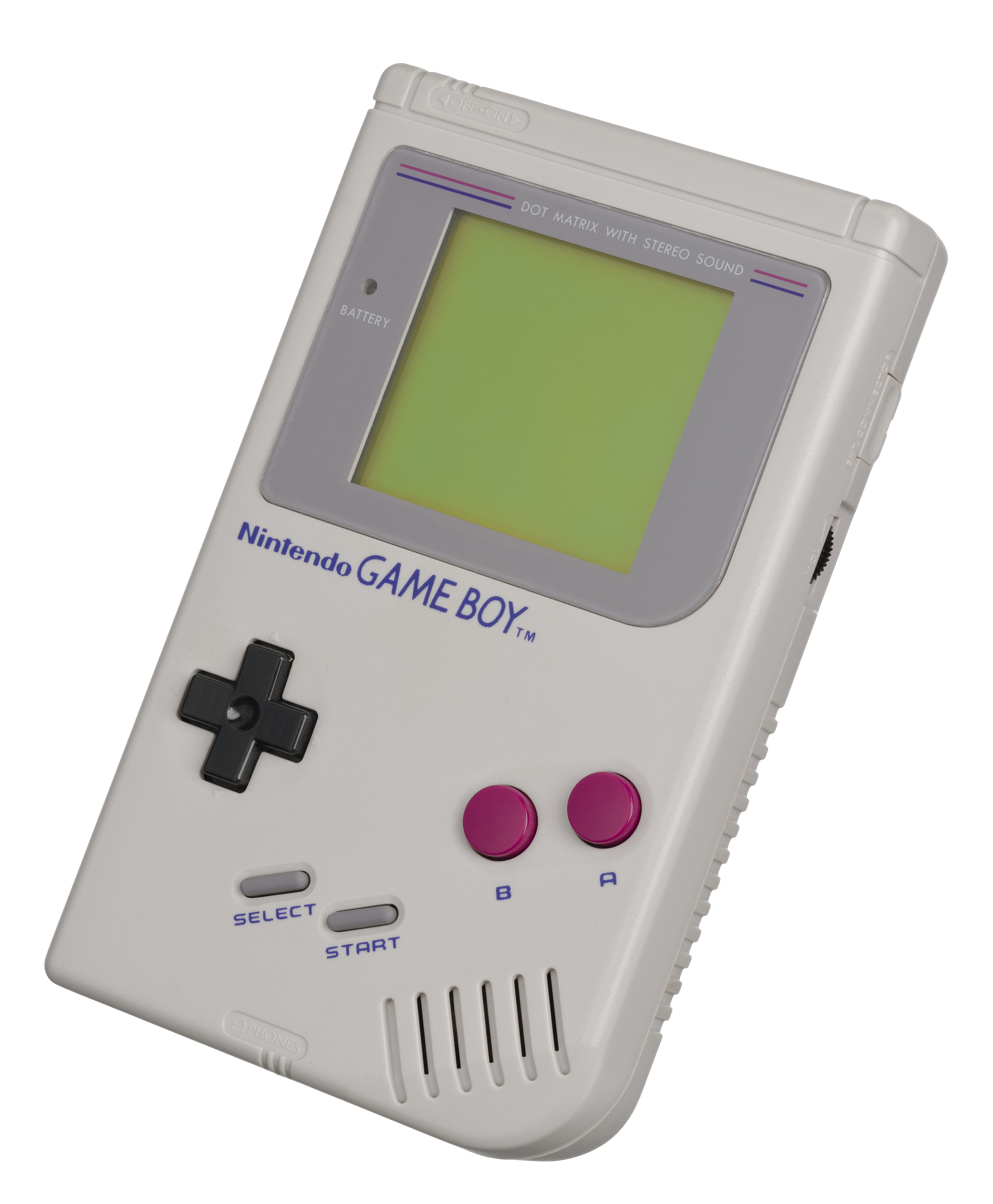
Nintendo's Game Boy was a popular handheld game console during the 1990s.

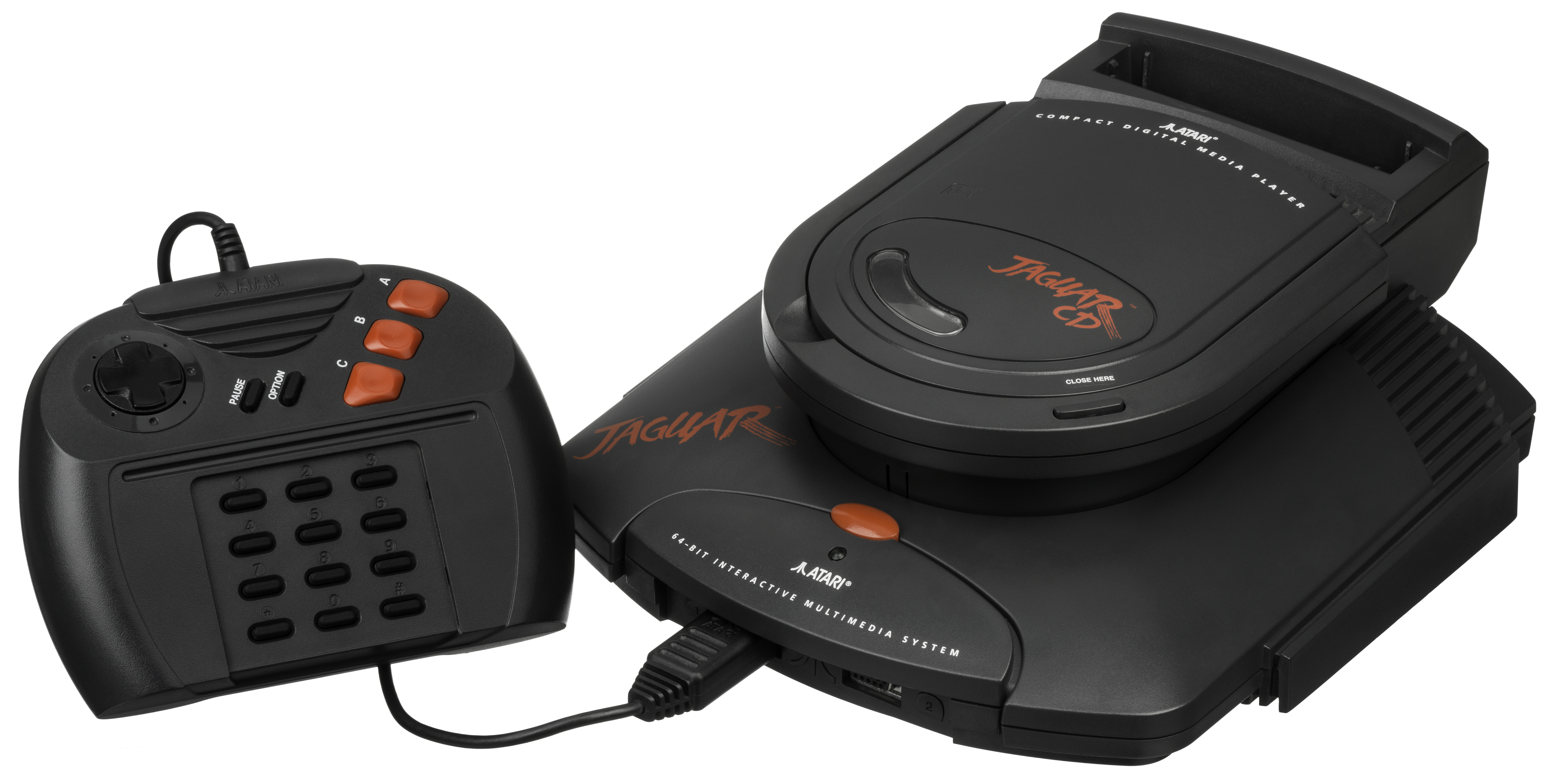
The Atari Jaguar released in 1993, becoming part Fifth-gen of video game consoles.

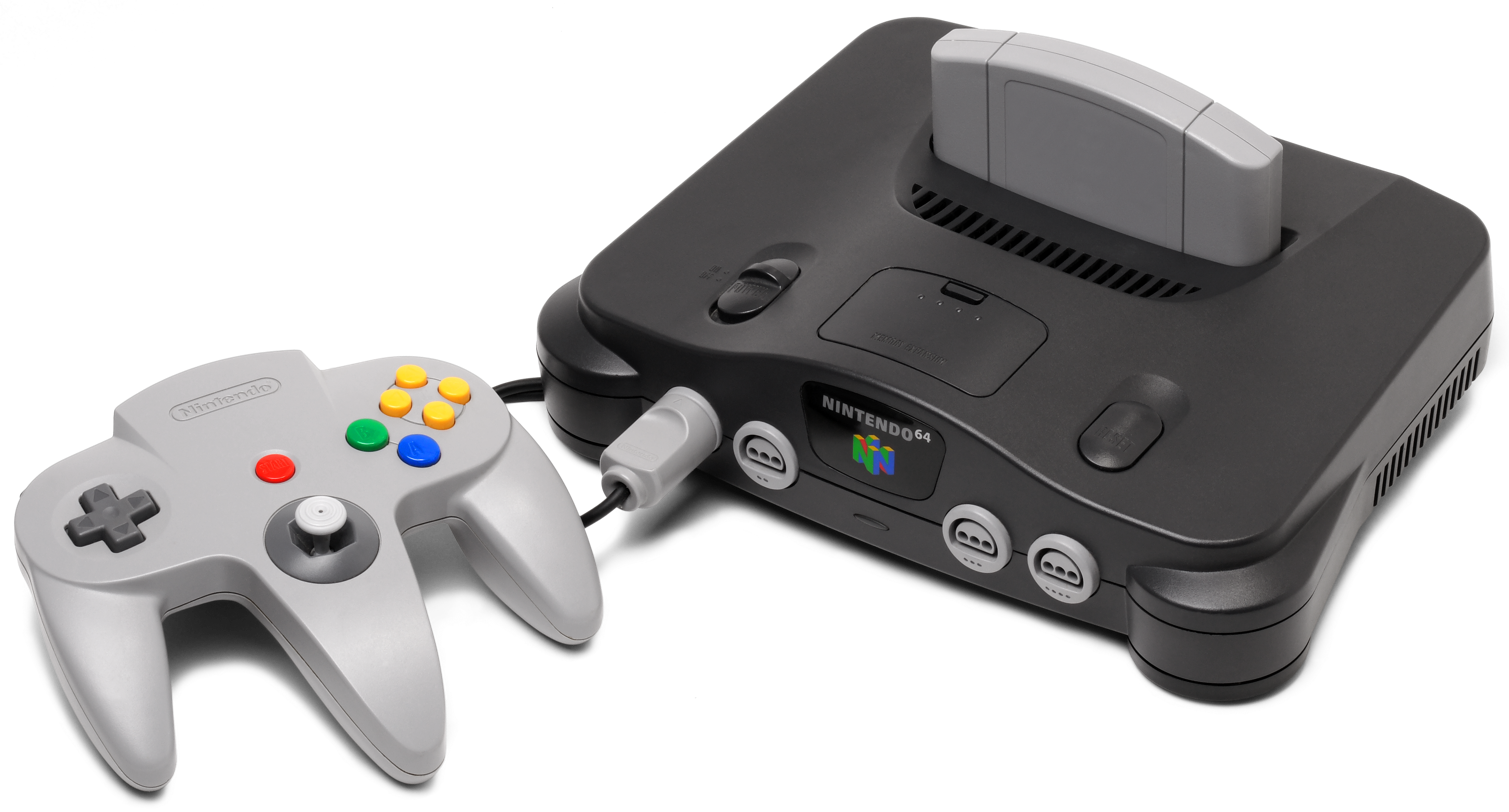
The Nintendo 64 was released in 1996. Super Mario 64 was the best-selling game of the decade.

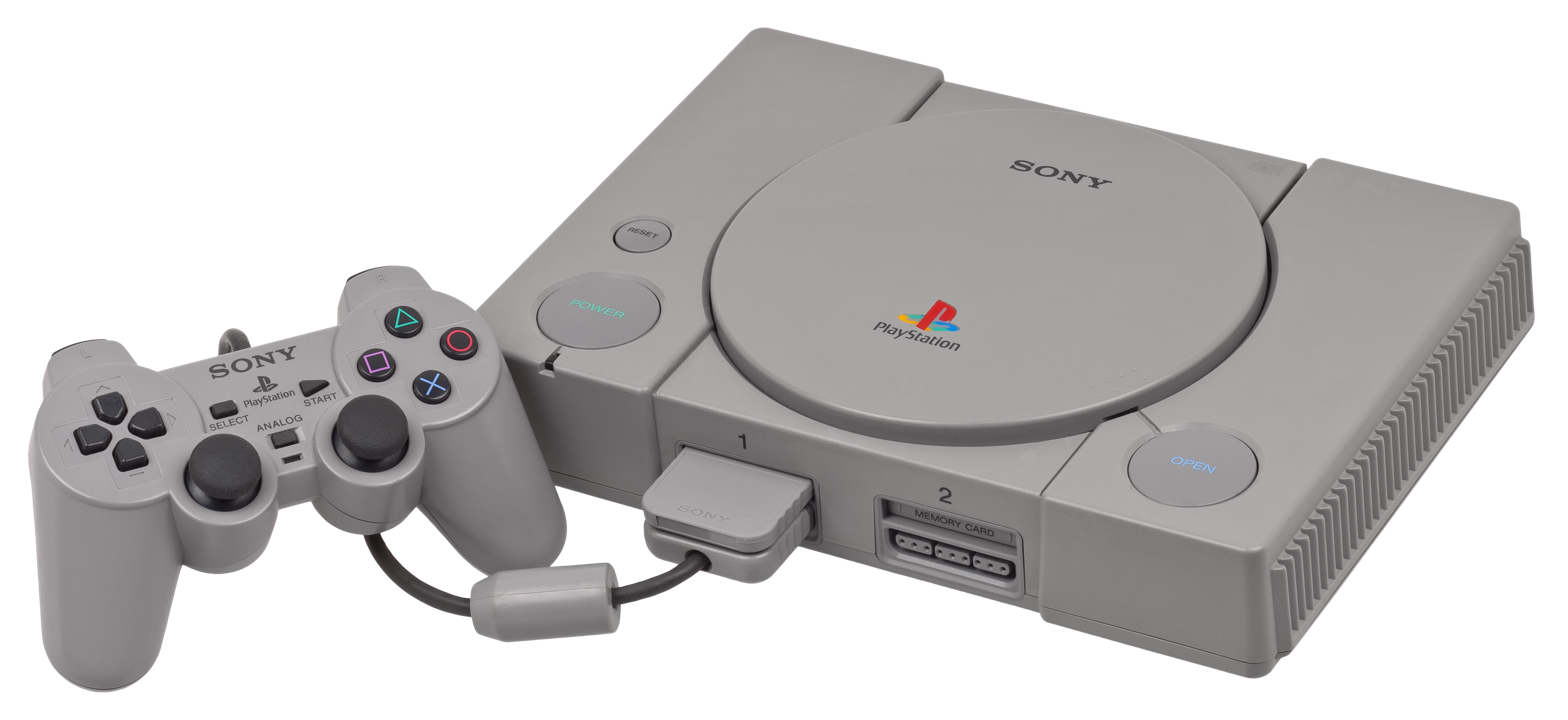
The PlayStation was released in 1994 and became the best-selling gaming console of its time.

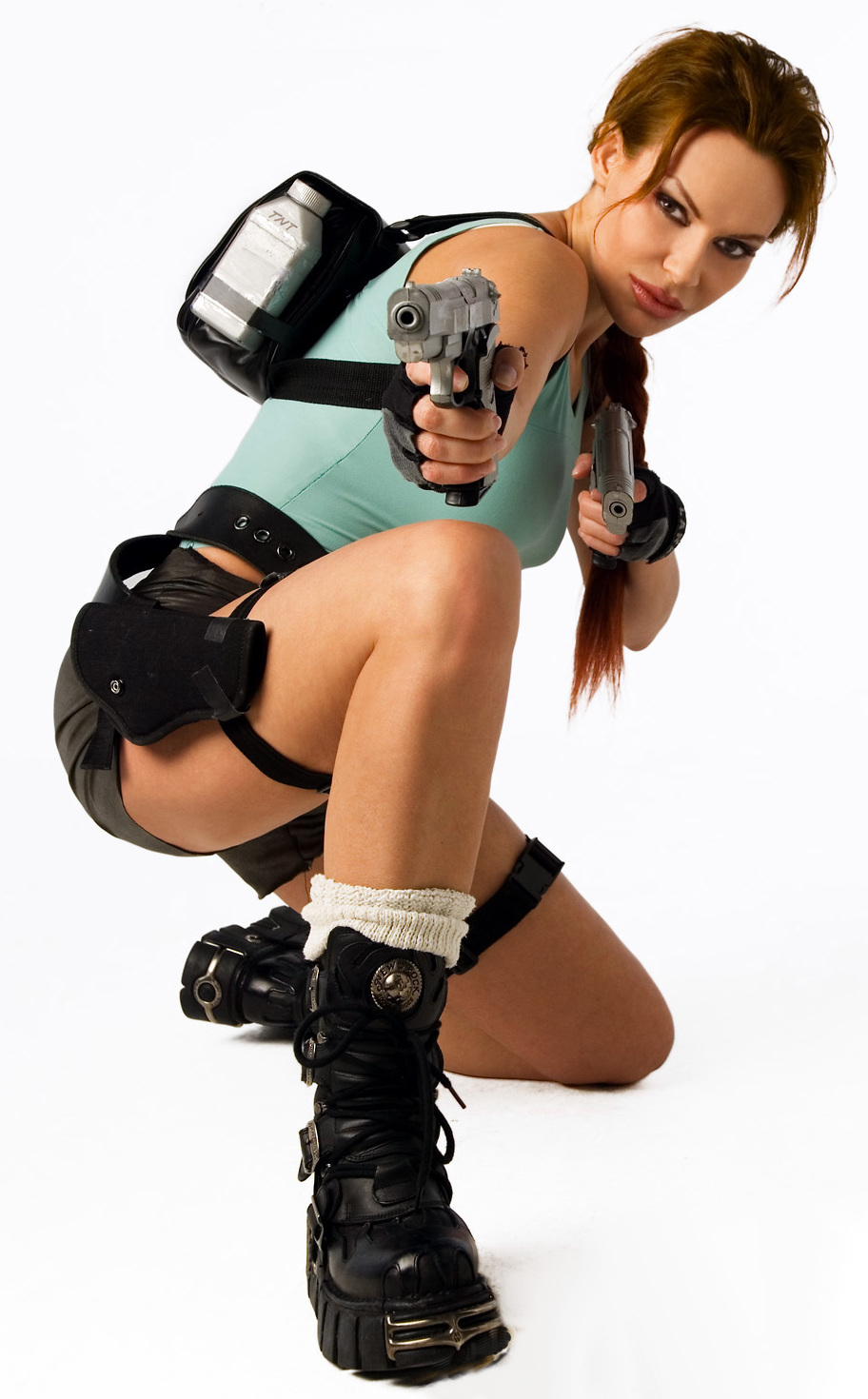
The game Tomb Raider, launched in 1996, became particularly popular during the decade and as a result Lara Croft's character eventually became a cultural icon in the video game industry

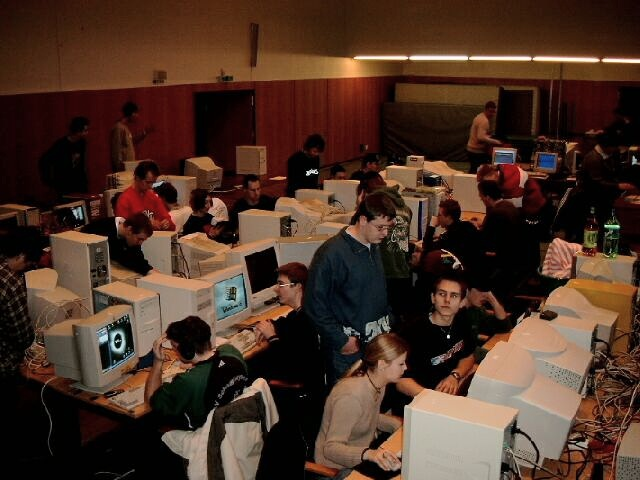
Private LAN parties were at the peak of their popularity in the late 1990s and early 2000s when broadband Internet access was unavailable or too expensive for most people

=== Architecture ===
- The Petronas Twin Towers became two of the tallest man-made structures ever built after they officially opened on 31 August 1999, surpassing the Willis Tower, which had held the mark for more than a quarter century.

=== Sports ===
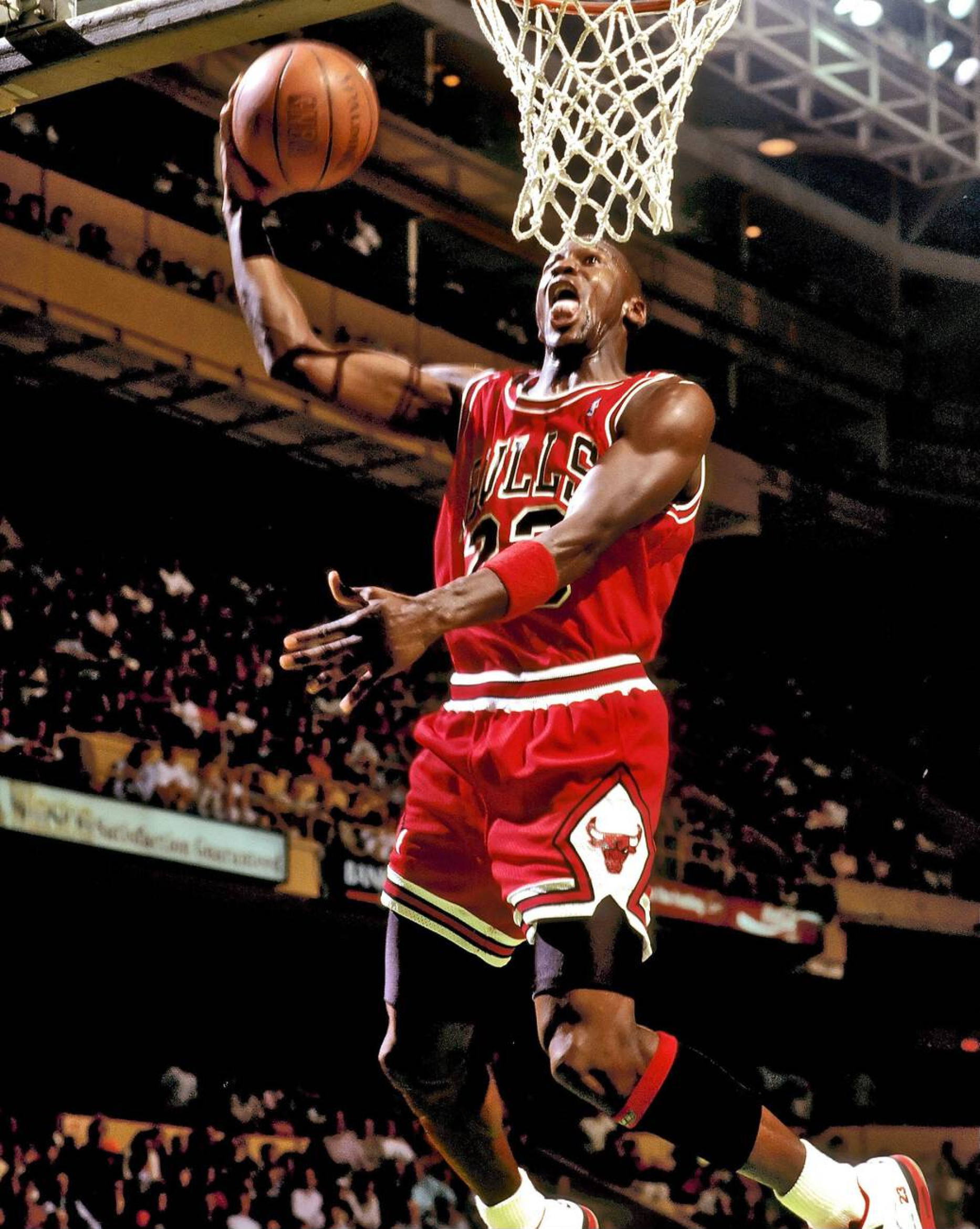
Michael Jordan, the most popular NBA player of the 1990s.

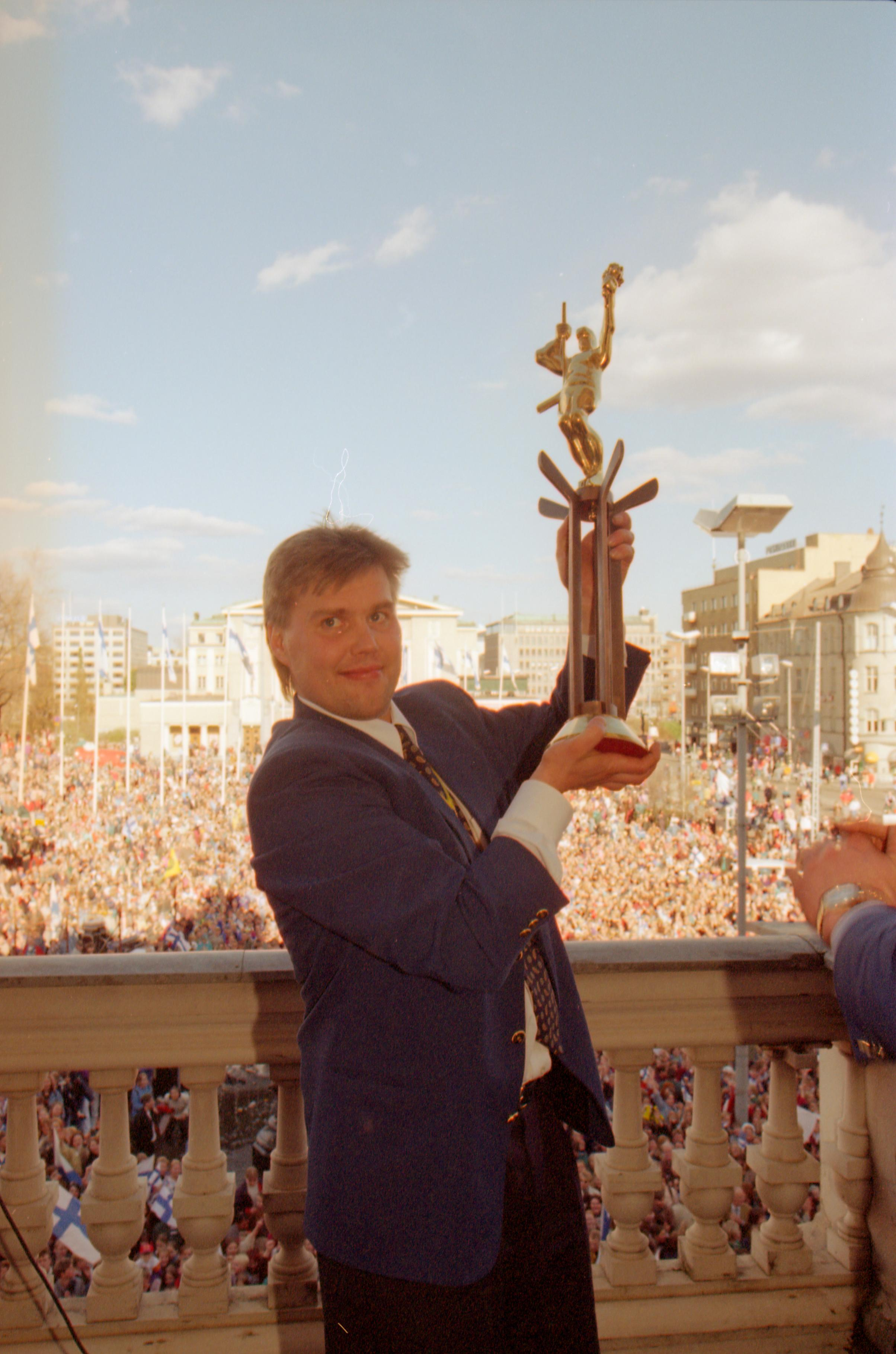
Timo Jutila with Ice Hockey World Championship trophy in 1995

- In college football, the Inaugural 1992 SEC Championship Game occurred at Legion Field in Birmingham, Alabama. The Alabama Crimson Tide football team, under then-Coach Gene Stallings, went 11-0 and defeated the Florida Gators under then-Coach Steve Spurrier. The Tide would later finish 13–0 to win the National Championship and beat the Miami Hurricanes in the 1993 Sugar Bowl. However, Spurrier and the Gators would later win Four SEC Championships from 1993 to 1996. They went on to win their first National Championship in the 1997 Nokia Sugar Bowl by defeating the Florida State Seminoles.
- The 1992 Summer Olympics are held in Barcelona, Spain and the 1996 Summer Olympics are held in Atlanta, United States.
- The 1992 United States men's Olympic basketball team, nicknamed the "Dream Team", was the first American Olympic team to feature active professional players from the National Basketball Association. Described as the "greatest team ever assembled", its roster included the likes of Michael Jordan, Larry Bird, and Magic Johnson.
- Major League Baseball players went on strike on 12 August 1994, thus ending the season and canceling the World Series for the first time in 90 years. The players' strike ended on 29 March 1995, when players and team owners agreed.
- The 1991 World Series pitted the Atlanta Braves and the Minnesota Twins, two teams who finished last place in their respective divisions, the previous season. The series would go all seven games won by the home teams, concluding dramatically with the Minnesota Twins claiming their second World Series title.
- American NBA basketball player Michael Jordan became a major sports and pop culture icon, idolized by millions worldwide. He revolutionized sports marketing through deals with companies such as Gatorade, Hanes, McDonald's and Nike. His Chicago Bulls team won six NBA titles during the decade (1991, 1992, 1993, 1996, 1997 and 1998). He was also notable in Hollywood thanks to his self-portrayal in the film Space Jam with the Looney Tunes characters.
- The National Hockey League would expand from 21 to 30 teams. During the expansion years, several teams would relocate to new cities: the Winnipeg Jets moved to Phoenix, Arizona and became the Phoenix Coyotes, the Quebec Nordiques moved to Denver and became the Colorado Avalanche, the Hartford Whalers moved to Raleigh, North Carolina and became the Carolina Hurricanes, and the Minnesota North Stars moved to Dallas and became the Dallas Stars.
  - The NHL's 1990s expansion saw new teams in cities that previously never had NHL hockey: San Jose (San Jose Sharks), Anaheim (Mighty Ducks of Anaheim), Nashville (Nashville Predators), Miami (Florida Panthers), and Tampa (Tampa Bay Lightning). The NHL also returned to Atlanta with the expansion Atlanta Thrashers.
  - Two of the NHL's Original Six teams, the New York Rangers and the Detroit Red Wings, would end long Stanley Cup championship droughts; the Rangers in 1994 after 54 years, and the Red Wings would win back-to-back Cups in 1997 and 1998 after 42 years.
  - Canadian hockey star Mario Lemieux led the Pittsburgh Penguins, one of the original NHL expansion teams, to back-to-back Stanley Cup championships in 1991 and 1992.
  - In addition to the Pittsburgh Penguins, three other NHL expansion teams went on to earn their first Stanley Cup championships: the New Jersey Devils in 1995, the Colorado Avalanche in 1996, and the Dallas Stars in 1999.
  - Canadian hockey star Wayne Gretzky announced his retirement from the NHL in 1999. Upon his final game on 18 April, he held 40 regular-season records, 15 playoff records, and six All-Star records. He is the leading point-scorer in NHL history and the only NHL player to total over 200 points in one season – a feat he accomplished four times. In addition, he tallied over 100 points in 16 professional seasons, 14 of them consecutive. He played for four teams during his NHL career: the Edmonton Oilers, the Los Angeles Kings, the St. Louis Blues, and the New York Rangers.
- American cyclist Lance Armstrong won his first Tour de France in 1999, less than two years after battling testicular cancer. Armstrong would later become embattled in a major doping investigation, stripping him of this and all of his major cycling titles.
- In professional wrestling, as the popularity brought on by the 1980s boom period slowly declined in the former half of the 1990s, the World Wrestling Federation continued its "Golden Era" until 1993, led by such stars as Hulk Hogan, Ultimate Warrior, and The Undertaker (who would go on to have an undefeated streak at WrestleMania that continued until WrestleMania XXX in April 2014). Afterwards, a second boom period from the middle of the decade was initiated due to the Monday Night War between the WWF and WCW to later spawn the WWF's Attitude Era, home to some of the biggest names in wrestling history such as Stone Cold Steve Austin, The Rock, and Triple H. Meanwhile, the highly popular nWo stable, along with Sting and Goldberg, brought WCW major success.
- The Manchester United won an unprecedented treble of the Premier League, FA Cup and Champions League after defeating Bayern Munich 2–1 in May 1999.
- The United States hosted the 15th staging of the 1994 FIFA World Cup. It holds the record for the largest attendance per game during the World Cup finals (even after the tournament's expansion to 32 teams and 64 matches). Additionally, this led to the creation of the MLS.
- In motor racing, triple Formula One World Champion Ayrton Senna is fatally injured in a crash at San Marino in 1994. Michael Schumacher enters into the sport – winning his first two championships in 1994 and 1995. Dale Earnhardt wins the 1998 Daytona 500 and the NASCAR Winston Cup championship in 1990, 1991, 1993, and 1994. Indy Car racing delves into an organizational "Split".
- In the NFL, the San Francisco 49ers and the Washington Redskins showed promise of continuing their '80s glory by each team winning another Super Bowl at the beginning of the decade. However, it was the Dallas Cowboys who made a gradual return to dynasty status, winning three Super Bowls (1992, 1993 and 1995) in four years after a 14-year NFL championship drought. The Denver Broncos also won their first two Super Bowls after having lost four, winning consecutive championships of the 1997 and 1998 seasons.
- NASCAR also enjoyed a popularity boom in this decade, with new, young drivers, such as Davey Allison and Jeff Gordon winning Winston Cup championships.
- Florida State, 1987–2000 – At the height of Bobby Bowden's dominance, the Florida State Seminoles went 152–19–1, won nine ACC championships (1992–2000), two national championships (1993 and 1999), played for three more national championships (1996, 1998, and 2000), were ranked #1 in the preseason AP poll five times (1988, 1991, 1993, 1995, and 1999), never lost the #1 AP ranking during 1999, produced 20 1st round NFL draft picks (including the 1997 offensive and defensive rookies of the year), won at least ten games every year, and never finished a season ranked lower than fourth in the AP poll. Quarterbacks Charlie Ward and Chris Weinke won Heisman Trophies.
- The Nebraska Cornhuskers led by head coach Tom Osborne won three national championships in college football in four years (1994, 1995, 1997)
- Led by head coach Jim Tressel, The Youngstown State Penguins claimed to be the "team of the '90s" by winning four national championships (1991, 1993, 1994, 1997) in division I-AA college football
- The Ultimate Fighting Championship (1993) and Pride Fighting Championship (1997) debut and evolve into the modern sport of Mixed Martial Arts.
- Major League Baseball added four teams, Miami Marlins (as Florida Marlins), Colorado Rockies, Tampa Bay Rays (as Tampa Bay Devil Rays), and the Arizona Diamondbacks, and moved one (Milwaukee Brewers) into the National League. The Florida Marlins would win the World Series in 1997 and 2003; the Arizona Diamondbacks would win the World Series in 2001, becoming the fastest expansion team to win a major championship for any major sport; the Colorado Rockies and Tampa Bay Rays would appear in the World Series in 2007 and 2008 respectively.
- In 1998, Canada wins gold medals for the first time in Disc ultimate at the WFDF World Ultimate Championship in Open, Mixed, and Masters.
- In the 1996 Summer Olympics, the Women's Gymnastics team won the first team gold medal for the US in Olympic Gymnastics history.
- In 1997, eight Australian Rugby League Premiership clubs defect to the News Corporation-backed Super League, before a resolution sees the two parties form the National Rugby League in 1998. The British competition is bought out by News Corporation, and renamed Super League, which it is still currently named (although it was sold by News Corporation).

=== Literature ===
- Leading talk show host Oprah Winfrey became an important book influencer in 1996 when she launched the highly successful Oprah's Book Club.
- The hugely successful Harry Potter series by J. K. Rowling was introduced in 1997. The series, with seven main novels, would go on to become the best-selling book series in world history and adapted into a film series in 2001.
- John Grisham was the bestselling author in the United States in the 1990s, with over 60 million copies sold of novels such as The Pelican Brief, The Client, and The Firm.
- Other successful authors of the 1990s include Stephen King, Natsuo Kirino, Danielle Steel, Michael Crichton, James Redfield, Haruki Murakami, Keigo Higashino and Tom Clancy.
- Goosebumps by R. L. Stine, the second highest-grossing book series in the world, was introduced in 1992 and remained a dominant player in children's literature throughout and after the decade. A television series released on Fox Kids alongside a film version that released in 2015.
- The decline of diverse study options in university humanities schools due to economic rationalism, leading to a boom in purple prose heavily influenced by 20th century European social theory and cultural studies. In 1996 in what is known as the Sokal affair, a mathematician pranked a cultural studies by tricking them into publishing his nonsensical essay "Transgressing the Boundaries: Towards a Transformative Hermeneutics of Quantum Gravity" on the basis that the journal wasn't peer-reviewed and would publish anything that seemed fashionably left-wing. In 1996 the Postmodernism Generator used a recursive transition network to imitate the postmodernist style of humanities writing.
- 1990s saw the rise of independent literature and notable self-help books, included Men Are from Mars, Women Are from Venus by John Gray and Who Moved My Cheese? by Spencer Johnson.
- Making Monsters: False Memories, Psychotherapy, and Sexual Hysteria (1994) by Richard Ofshe and Ethan Watters was critical of the repressed memory therapy that was gaining some traction in psychotherapy.

== People ==
=== Scientists and engineers ===
- Tim Berners Lee
- Karlheinz Brandenburg
- Timothy Gowers
- Sue Hendrickson
- Juan Maldacena
- Eric Cornell
- Carl Wieman
- Adrian Newey
- Andre de Cortanze
- Dimitris Anastassiou
- Linus Torvalds
- Hiroyuki Suetaka
- Vladimir Voevodsky
- Andrew Wiles
- Aleksander Wolszczan

=== Actors and directors ===
- Bob Hope
- Ben Affleck
- Jason Alexander
- Tim Allen
- María Conchita Alonso
- Benyamin Sueb
- Gillian Anderson
- Pamela Anderson
- Paul Thomas Anderson
- Jennifer Aniston
- Christina Applegate
- Rosanna Arquette
- Rowan Atkinson
- Hank Azaria
- Kevin Bacon
- Alec Baldwin
- Antonio Banderas
- Christopher Daniel Barnes
- Roseanne Barr
- Drew Barrymore
- Kim Basinger
- Angela Bassett
- Sean Bean
- Tom Berenger
- Daniel Beretta
- Elizabeth Berkley
- Sandra Bernhard
- Halle Berry
- Kathryn Bigelow
- Powers Boothe
- Ernest Borgnine
- Matthew Broderick
- Avery Brooks
- Pierce Brosnan
- Clancy Brown
- Sandra Bullock
- Tim Burton
- Brett Butler
- Yancy Butler
- Gabriel Byrne
- James Caan
- Nicolas Cage
- Dean Cain
- Chen Kaige
- James Cameron
- Neve Campbell
- Drew Carey
- George Carlin
- Jim Carrey
- Dana Carvey
- Dan Castellaneta
- Jackie Chan
- Dave Chappelle
- George Clooney
- Kevin Conroy
- Tim Conway
- Coen brothers
- Sean Connery
- Kevin Costner
- Courteney Cox
- Marcia Cross
- Tom Cruise
- Billy Crystal
- Macaulay Culkin
- Vondie Curtis-Hall
- Willem Dafoe
- Matt Damon
- Frank Darabont
- Richard Darbois
- Robert Davi
- Ellen DeGeneres
- Robert De Niro
- Gérard Depardieu
- Johnny Depp
- Danny DeVito
- Leonardo DiCaprio
- Shannen Doherty
- Kirk Douglas
- Brad Dourif
- Fran Drescher
- Léa Drucker
- David Duchovny
- Kirsten Dunst
- Charles S. Dutton
- Clint Eastwood
- Anthony Edwards
- Peter Falk
- Chris Farley
- David Faustino
- Abel Ferrara
- Will Ferrell
- Laurence Fishburne
- Calista Flockhart
- Harrison Ford
- William Forsythe
- Jodie Foster
- Jacques Frantz
- Dennis Franz
- Brendan Fraser
- Morgan Freeman
- Edward Furlong
- Eva Gabor
- James Gandolfini
- Janeane Garofalo
- Jennie Garth
- Sarah Michelle Gellar
- Mel Gibson
- Peri Gilpin
- Danny Glover
- Whoopi Goldberg
- Jeff Goldblum
- Trevor Goddard
- John Goodman
- Joseph Gordon-Levitt
- Mark-Paul Gosselaar
- Kelsey Grammer
- Brian Austin Green
- Graham Greene
- Thomas Ian Griffith
- Arsenio Hall
- Linda Hamilton
- Tom Hanks
- Curtis Hanson
- Phil Hartman
- Woody Harrelson
- Ed Harris
- Teri Hatcher
- Rutger Hauer
- Ethan Hawke
- Salma Hayek
- Isaac Hayes
- Mitch Hedberg
- Lance Henriksen
- Bill Hicks
- Agnieszka Holland
- Anthony Hopkins
- Dennis Hopper
- Bob Hoskins
- Ernie Hudson
- Helen Hunt
- Jeremy Irons
- Samuel L. Jackson
- Angelina Jolie
- Tommy Lee Jones
- Mike Judge
- Shekhar Kapur
- Tchéky Karyo
- Michael Keaton
- Harvey Keitel
- Tom Kenny
- Nicole Kidman
- Krzysztof Kieślowski
- Val Kilmer
- Greg Kinnear
- Lisa Kudrow
- Christopher Lambert
- Nathan Lane
- Eriq La Salle
- Martin Lawrence
- Matt LeBlanc
- Ang Lee
- Spike Lee
- Jane Leeves
- John Leguizamo
- Jennifer Jason Leigh
- Valérie Lemercier
- Jay Leno
- Jared Leto
- David Letterman
- Ted Levine
- Jet Li
- Rachael Lillis
- Delroy Lindo
- Ray Liotta
- John Lithgow
- Heather Locklear
- Mario Lopez
- Julia Louis-Dreyfus
- Dolph Lundgren
- Michael Madsen
- Bill Maher
- John Mahoney
- Maïwenn
- John Malkovich
- Julianna Margulies
- Steve Martin
- Frances McDormand
- John McTiernan
- Alyssa Milano
- Demi Moore
- Julianne Moore
- Joe Morton
- Carrie-Anne Moss
- Kate Mulgrew
- Charlie Murphy
- Eddie Murphy
- Mike Myers
- Samy Naceri
- Hideo Nakata
- Liam Neeson
- Craig T. Nelson
- Bob Newhart
- Brigitte Nielsen
- Connie Nielsen
- Leslie Nielsen
- Aaron Norris
- Chuck Norris
- Bill Nunn
- Conan O'Brien
- Ed O'Neill
- Gary Oldman
- Jerry Orbach
- Al Pacino
- Gwyneth Paltrow
- Robert Patrick
- Alexandra Paul
- Bill Paxton
- Chris Penn
- Sean Penn
- Ron Perlman
- Luke Perry
- Matthew Perry
- Joe Pesci
- Michelle Pfeiffer
- River Phoenix
- David Hyde Pierce
- Brad Pitt
- Kevin Pollak
- Jason Priestley
- Alex Proyas
- Dennis Quaid
- Randy Quaid
- Christopher Reeve
- Keanu Reeves
- Jean Reno
- Paul Reiser
- Pascal Renwick
- Phillip Rhee
- Michael Richards
- Alan Rickman
- Ving Rhames
- Tim Robbins
- Eric Roberts
- Julia Roberts
- Chris Rock
- Michael Rooker
- Richard Roundtree
- Mickey Rourke
- Tim Roth
- RuPaul
- Kurt Russell
- Daniel Russo
- Rene Russo
- Meg Ryan
- Winona Ryder
- Katey Sagal
- Bob Saget
- Adam Sandler
- Susan Sarandon
- Arnold Schwarzenegger
- David Schwimmer
- Steven Seagal
- Jerry Seinfeld
- Garry Shandling
- Harry Shearer
- Charlie Sheen
- Elisabeth Shue
- Sarah Silverman
- Tony Sirico
- Christian Slater
- Will Smith
- Jimmy Smits
- Wesley Snipes
- Kevin Spacey
- David Spade
- Tori Spelling
- Steven Spielberg
- Sage Stallone
- Sylvester Stallone
- John Stamos
- Mike Starr
- Jon Stewart
- Patrick Stewart
- Sharon Stone
- Meryl Streep
- Donald Sutherland
- Kiefer Sutherland
- Patrick Swayze
- Ice-T
- Jeffrey Tambor
- Quentin Tarantino
- Veronica Taylor
- Charlize Theron
- Tiffani-Amber Thiessen
- Uma Thurman
- Jennifer Tilly
- Tony Todd
- Danny Trejo
- John Travolta
- Robin Tunney
- Jean-Claude Van Damme
- Dick Van Dyke
- Gus Van Sant
- Arnold Vosloo
- Christopher Walken
- Marcia Wallace
- Fred Ward
- Denzel Washington
- Sam Waterston
- Sigourney Weaver
- Hugo Weaving
- Vernon Wells
- Forest Whitaker
- Michael Jai White
- Robin Williams
- Bruce Willis
- Rita Wilson
- Oprah Winfrey
- Michael Winterbottom
- John Woo
- James Woods
- Noah Wyle
- Robert Zemeckis
- Ian Ziering

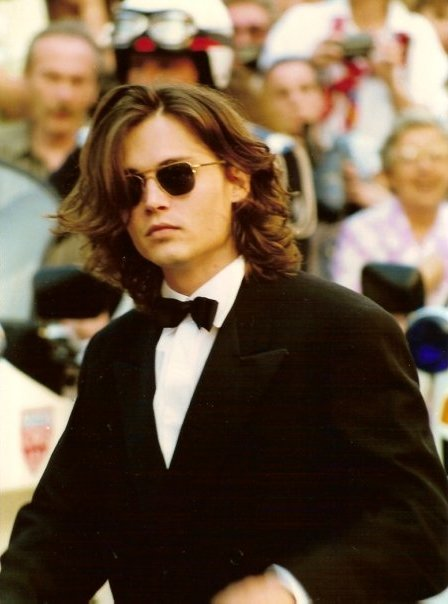
Johnny Depp

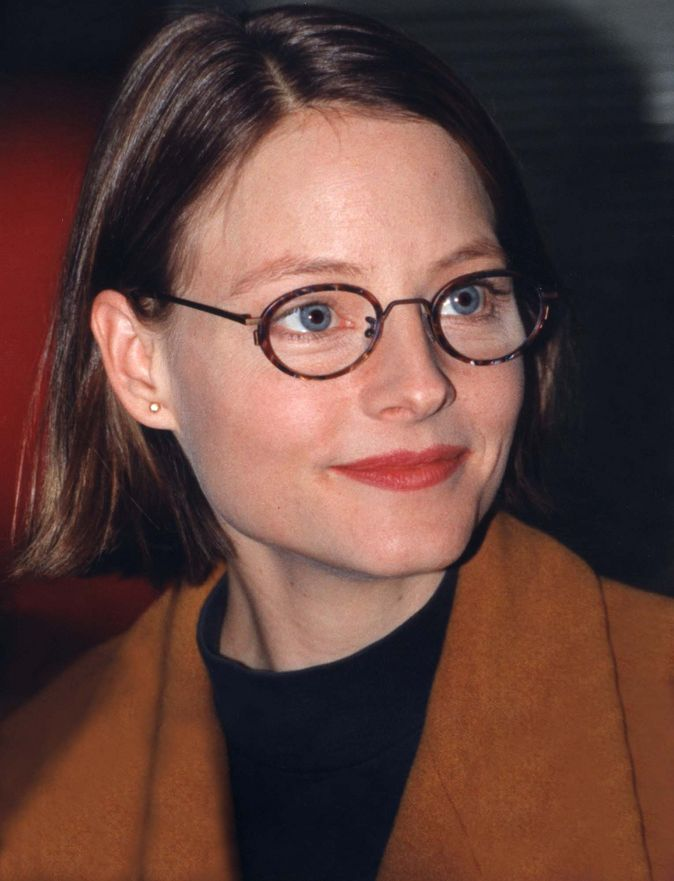
Jodie Foster

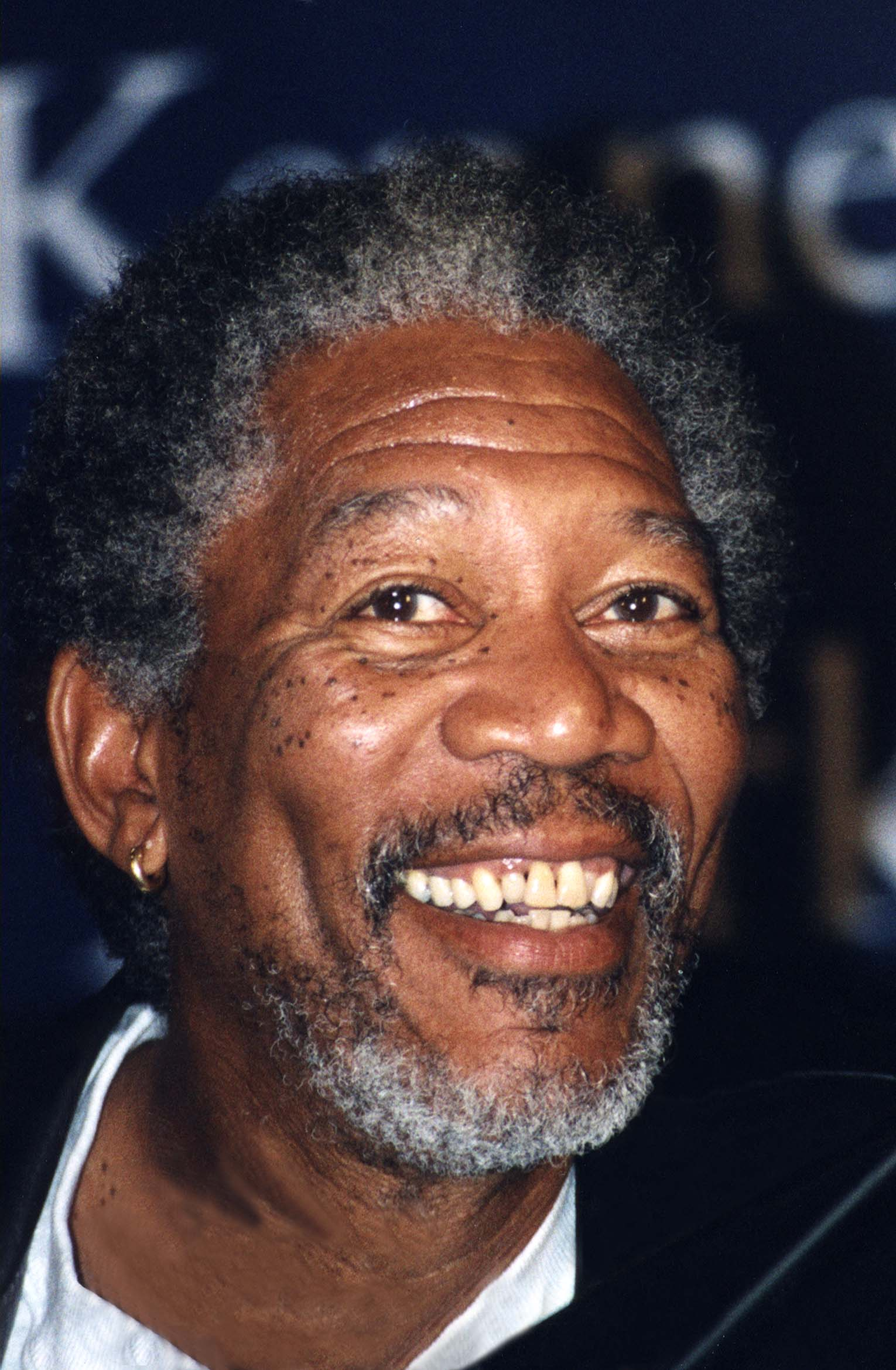
Morgan Freeman

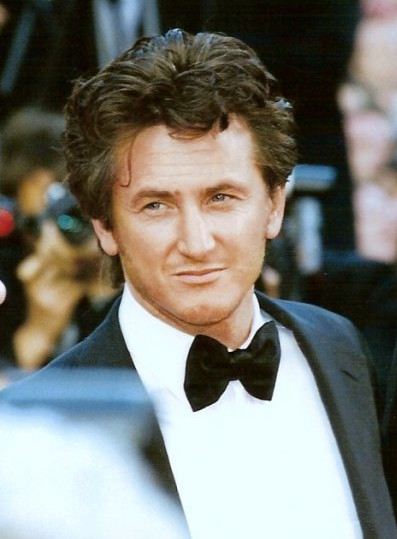
Sean Penn

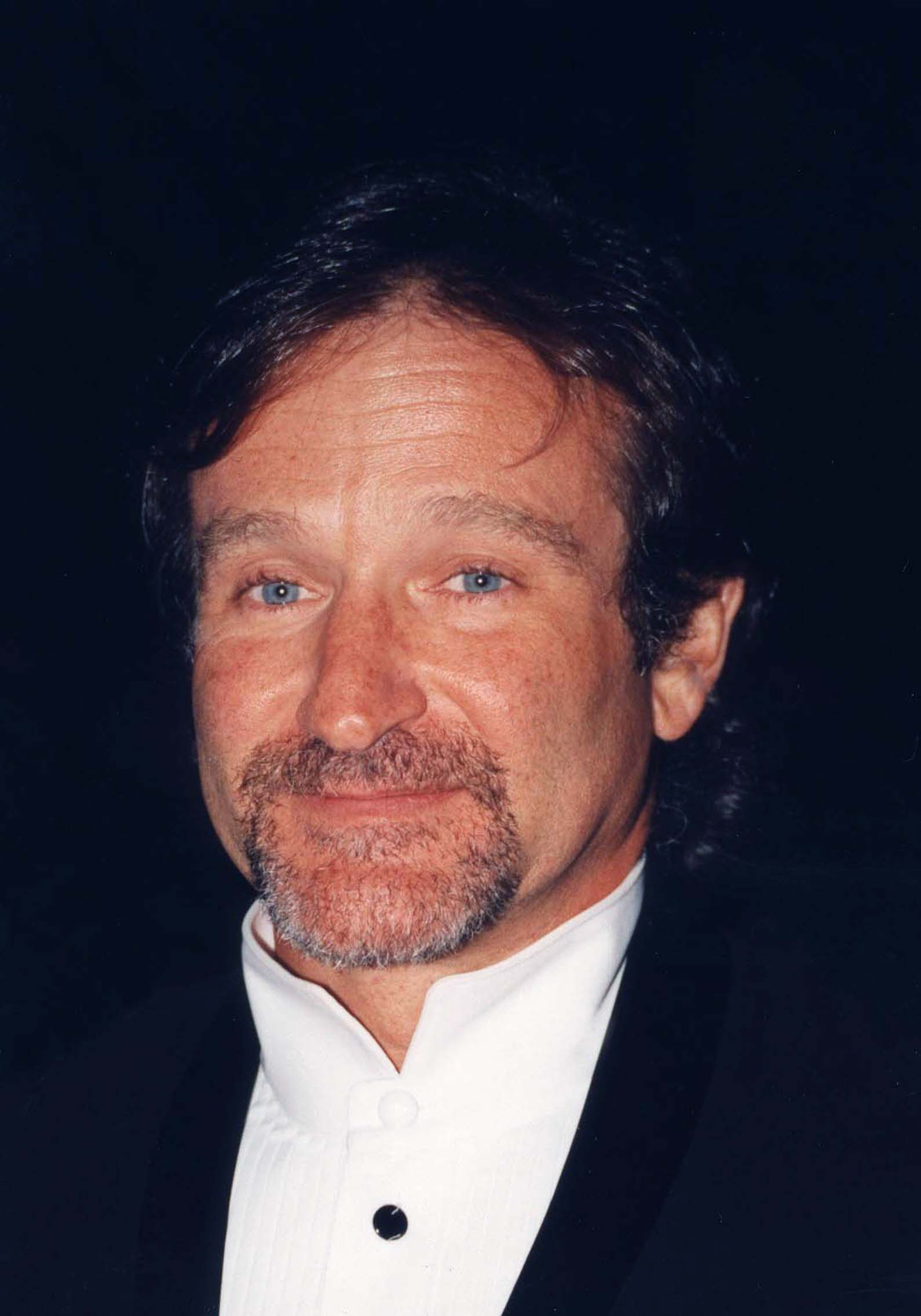
Robin Williams

=== Athletes ===
==== Basketball ====
- Charles Barkley
- Larry Bird
- Clyde Drexler
- Tim Duncan
- Patrick Ewing
- Kevin Garnett
- Allen Iverson
- Michael Jordan
- Toni Kukoč
- Karl Malone
- Reggie Miller
- Shaquille O'Neal
- Hakeem Olajuwon
- Gary Payton
- Scottie Pippen
- David Robinson
- Dennis Rodman
- Arvydas Sabonis
- John Stockton

==== Boxing ====
- Tommy Morrison
- Oscar De La Hoya
- Roy Jones Jr.
- Michael Carbajal
- Mike Tyson
- Lennox Lewis
- Evander Holyfield
- Pernell Whitaker
- Felix Savon

==== Cricket ====
- Steve Waugh
- Shane Warne
- Glenn McGrath
- Sachin Tendulkar
- Brian Lara

==== Football ====
- José Luis Chilavert
- Eric Cantona
- Marco van Basten
- Roberto Baggio
- Hristo Stoitchkov
- George Weah
- Ronaldo
- David Beckham
- Zinedine Zidane
- Steve McManaman
- Robbie Fowler
- Michael Owen
- Romário
- Roberto Carlos
- Gabriel Batistuta
- Paolo Maldini
- Jürgen Klinsmann
- Rudi Völler
- Raúl González
- Christian Vieri
- Franco Baresi
- Alessandro Del Piero
- Diego Maradona
- Roger Milla
- Dennis Bergkamp
- Lothar Matthäus
- Frank Rijkaard
- Ronald Koeman
- Ruud Gullit
- Gheorghe Hagi
- Davor Šuker
- Roy Keane
- Paul Gascoigne
- Alan Shearer
- David Seaman
- Tony Adams
- Cafu
- David Ginola
- Michael Laudrup
- Peter Schmeichel
- Ryan Giggs
- Paul Scholes
- Fabien Barthez
- Oliver Bierhoff
- Jean-Pierre Papin
- Rivaldo
- Carlos Valderrama
- Faustino Asprilla
- René Higuita
- Jari Litmanen

==== Ice Hockey ====
- Wayne Gretzky
- Mario Lemieux
- Mark Messier
- Patrick Roy
- Jaromír Jágr
- Martin Brodeur
- Dominik Hašek
- Steve Yzerman
- Peter Forsberg
- Brett Hull

==== Rugby ====
- Neil Back
- Andrew Johns
- Danie Gerber
- Ellery Hanley
- Jonah Lomu
- Martin Offiah
- Francois Pienaar

==== Wrestling ====
- "Stone Cold" Steve Austin
- Dwayne "The Rock" Johnson
- Hulk Hogan
- "Macho Man" Randy Savage
- Shawn Michaels
- Bret Hart
- Goldberg
- The Undertaker
- Steve Borden
- Triple H
- Kane
- Big Show
- Mick Foley
- Ric Flair

==== Tennis ====
- Andre Agassi
- Pete Sampras
- Steffi Graf
- Martina Hingis
- Monica Seles

==== Volleyball ====
- Lorenzo Bernardi

==== NFL ====
- Troy Aikman
- Brett Favre
- Jerry Rice
- John Elway
- Emmitt Smith
- Barry Sanders
- Deion Sanders

==== AFL ====
- Wayne Carey
- Robert Harvey
- Tony Lockett
- Jason Dunstall

==== Cycling ====
- Lance Armstrong
- Miguel Indurain

==== Baseball ====
- Barry Bonds
- Mark McGwire
- Ken Griffey Jr.
- Derek Jeter

==== Car Racing ====
- Dale Earnhardt
- Jeff Gordon
- Alan Kulwicki
- Dale Jarrett
- Michael Schumacher
- Damon Hill
- Mika Häkkinen
- Alain Prost
- Ayrton Senna
- Nigel Mansell
- Jacques Villeneuve
- Emerson Fittipaldi
- Gerhard Berger
- Jean Alesi
- Ricardo Patrese
- David Coulthard
- Heinz-Harald Frentzen
- Eddie Irvine
- Olivier Panis
- Al Unser Jr.
- Johnny Herbert
- Bertrand Gachot
- Yannick Dalmas
- Gabriele Tarquini
- Nicola Larini
- Andy Rouse
- Klaus Ludwig
- Ellen Lohr
- Carlos Sainz
- Juha Kankkunen
- Colin McRae
- Tommi Mäkinen
- Richard Burns
- Didier Auriol
- Francois Delecour
- Kenneth Eriksson
- Philippe Bugalski
- Armin Schwarz
- Ari Vatanen
- Kenjiro Shinozuka
- Jean-Louis Schlesser
- Nobuhiro Tajima

==== Motorcycling ====
- Wayne Rainey
- Michael Doohan
- Alex Criville
- Kevin Schwantz
- Luca Cadalora
- Max Biaggi
- Carl Fogarty
- Troy Corser
- Joel Smets
- Stephane Peterhansel
- Edi Orioli

==== Powerboating ====
- Guido Cappellini

==== Surfing ====
- Kelly Slater

==== Sailling ====
- Nikos Kaklamanakis

==== Sport of Athletics ====
- Michael Johnson
- Alexander Karelin
- Jonathan Edwards
- Donovan Bailey
- Svetlana Masterkova
- Marie-José Pérec
- Sergey Bubka
- Jefferson Perez
- Carl Lewis
- Lynford Christie

==== Chess ====
- Garry Kasparov

==== Weightlifting ====
- Naim Süleymanoğlu
- Pyrros Dimas

==== Artistic Gymnastic ====
- Lilia Podkopayeva
- Vitaly Scherbo

==== Golf ====
- Tiger Woods

==== Polo ====
- Manuel Estiarte

==== MMA ====
- Royce Gracie

==== Darts ====
- Phil Taylor
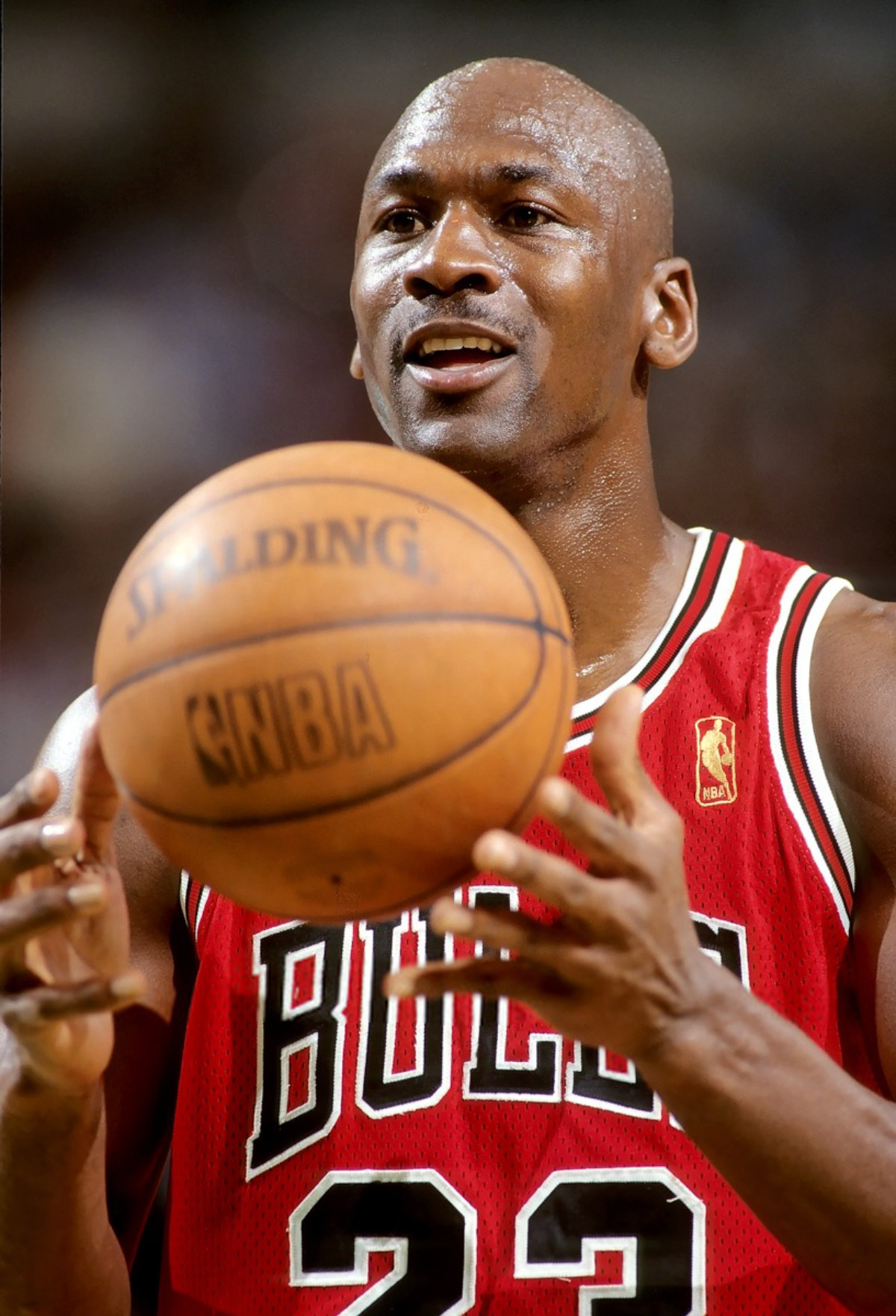
Michael Jordan

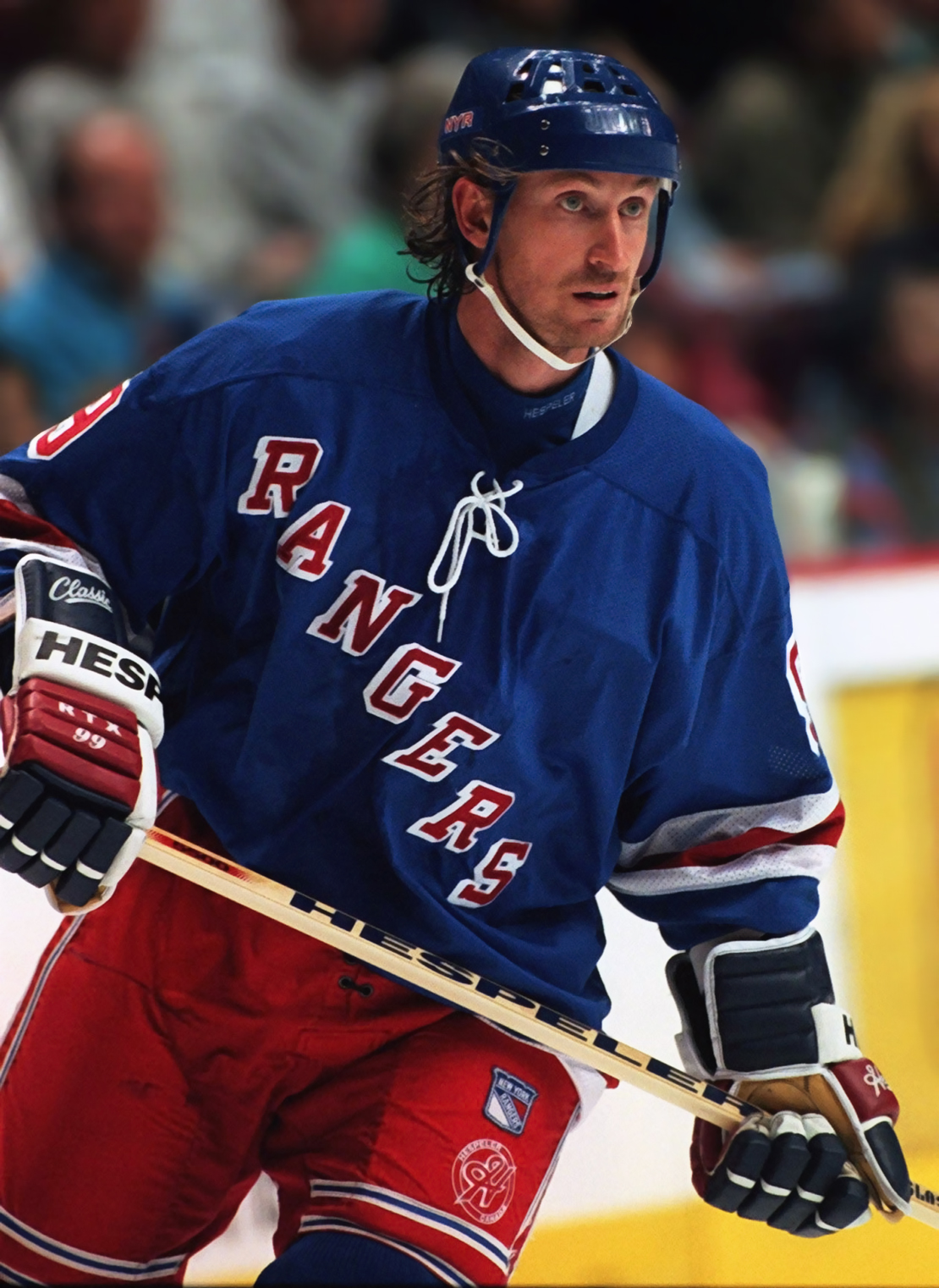
Wayne Gretzky

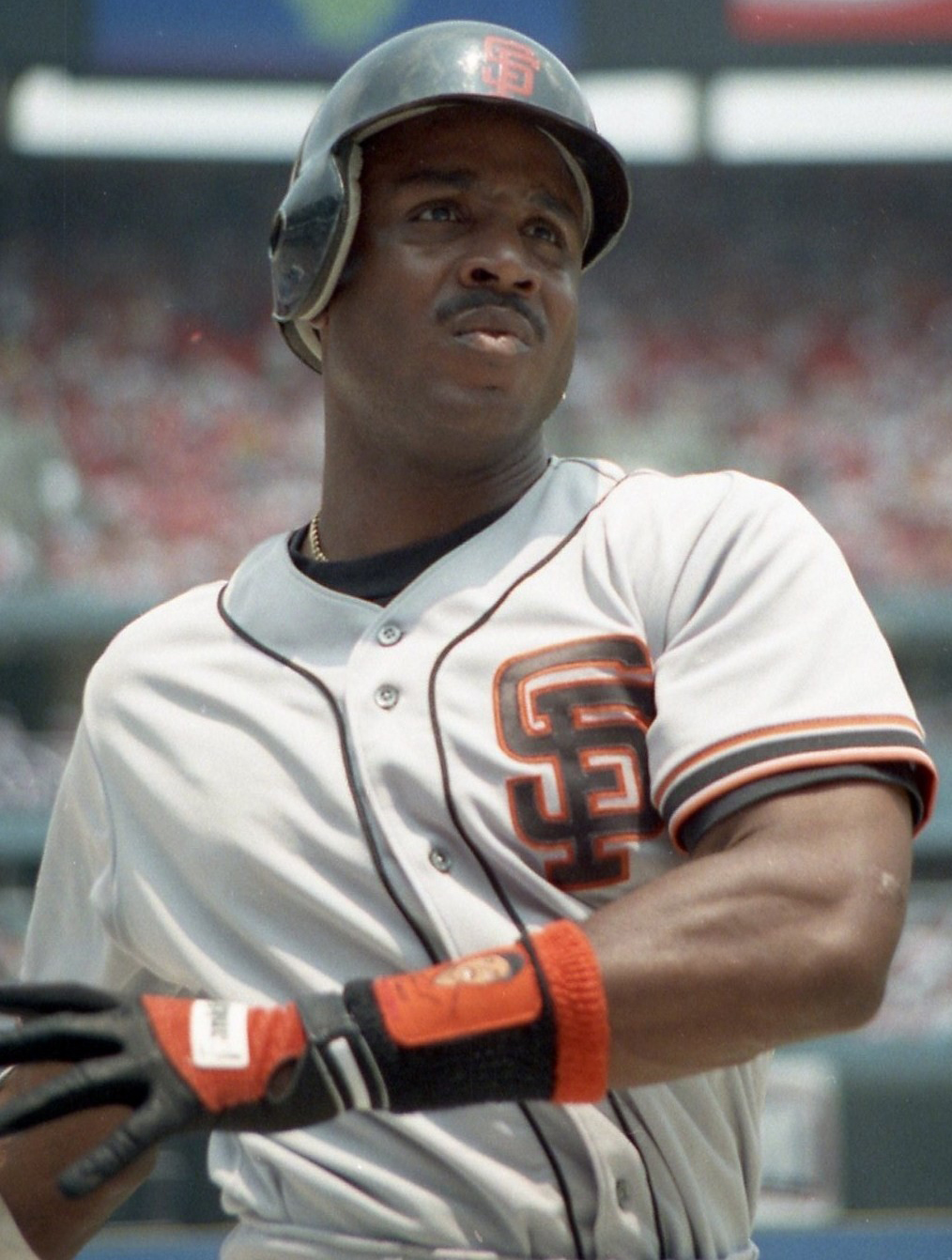
Barry Bonds

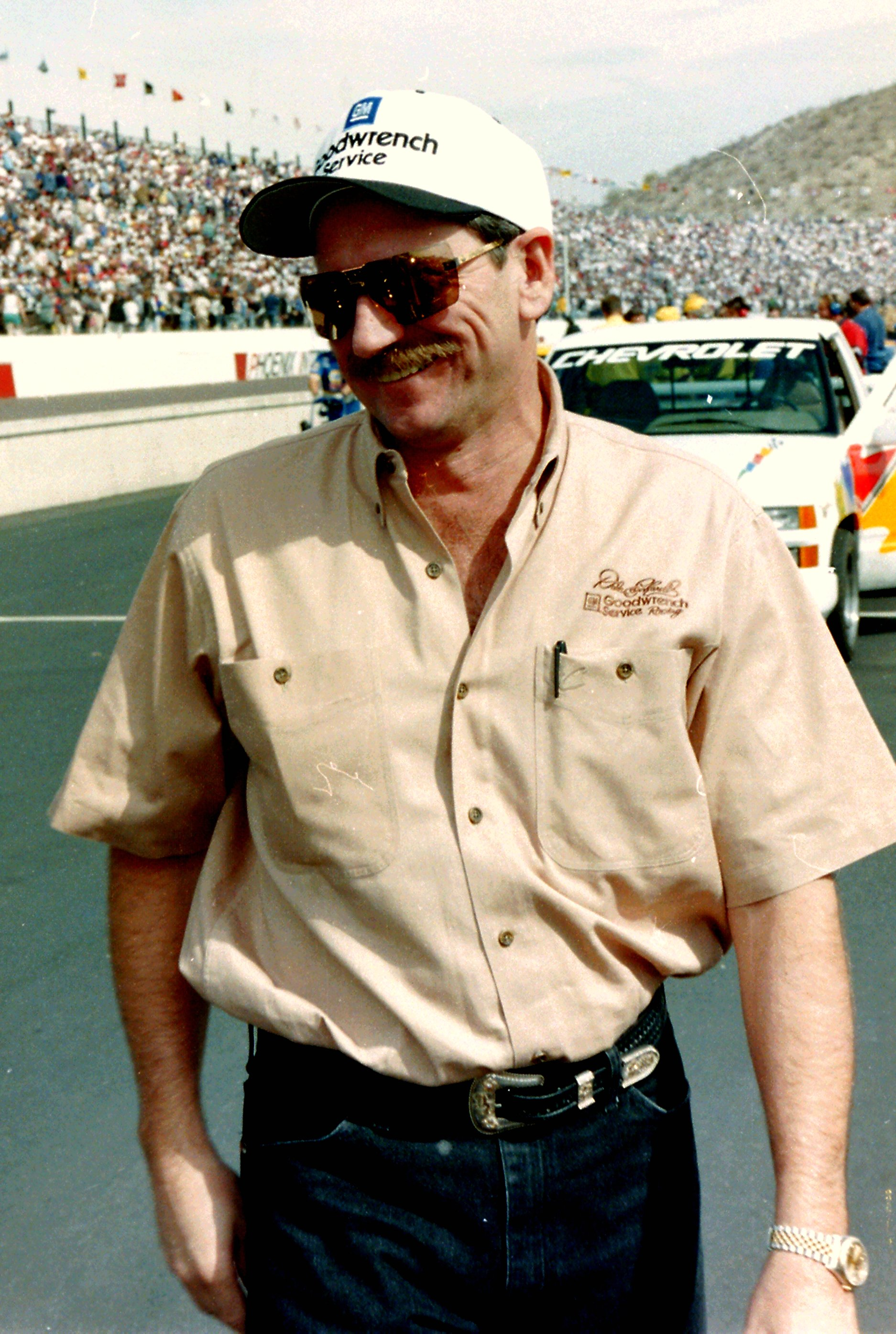
Dale Earnhardt

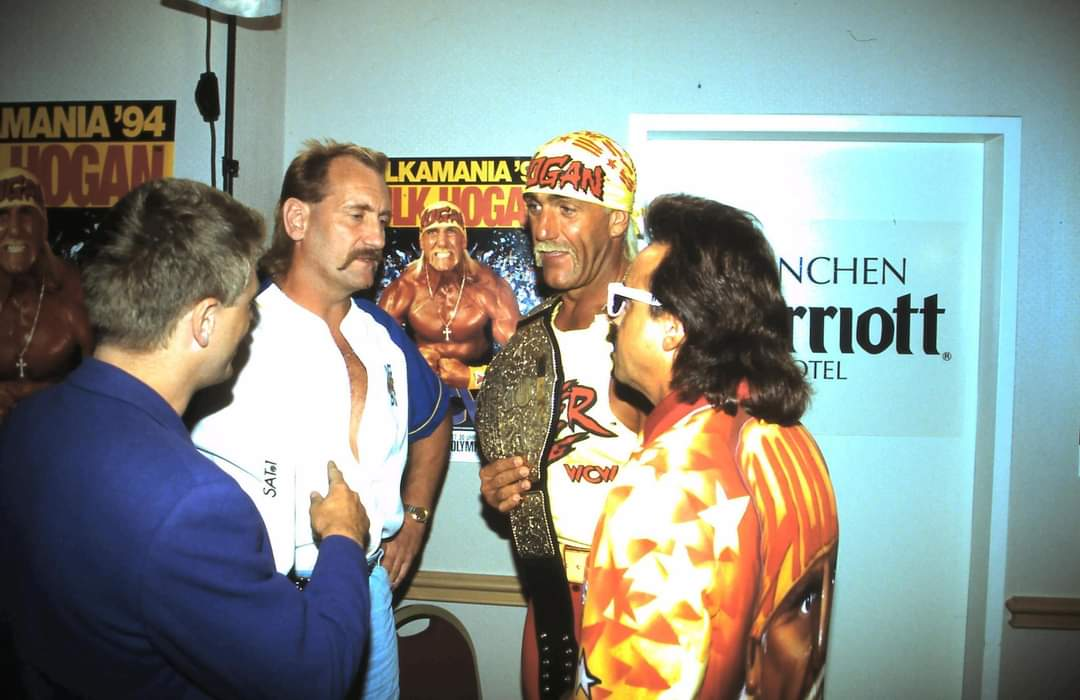
Hulk Hogan

=== Musicians ===
The 1990s saw the rise of diverse musical trends, identifiable through the decade's top-selling pop songs and the continued prominence of established genres such as gangsta rap, grunge, industrial rock, and deep house. Alternative hip-hop gained visibility at the start of the decade, while the public's interest in independent music surged as a counter to commercial radio payola.

Some of the notable artists and bands of the 1990s include AC/DC, Ace of Base, Alanis Morissette, Alice in Chains, Backstreet Boys, Madonna, Beck, Blur, Britney Spears, Celine Dion, Daft Punk, Depeche Mode, Destiny's Child, Eminem, Foo Fighters, Green Day, Goo Goo Dolls, Johnny Hallyday, Lauryn Hill, Michael Jackson, Mariah Carey, Nirvana, Oasis, Pearl Jam, Sound Garden, Radiohead, Red Hot Chili Peppers, R.E.M., Sinéad O'Connor, Snoop Dogg, Jay-Z, Spice Girls, Texas, The Smashing Pumpkins, Tupac Shakur, Notorious B.I.G., U2, Nas, and Wu-Tang Clan. These artists and bands defined the soundscape of the decade, shaping popular music and influencing future generations.

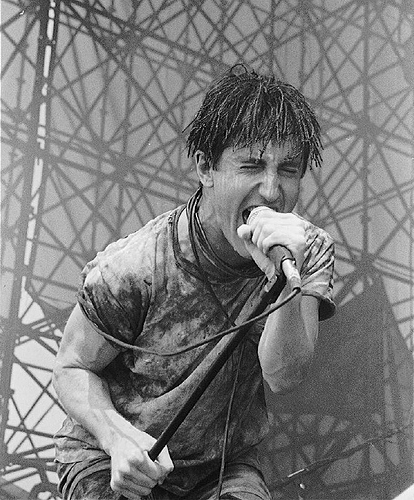
Nine Inch Nails

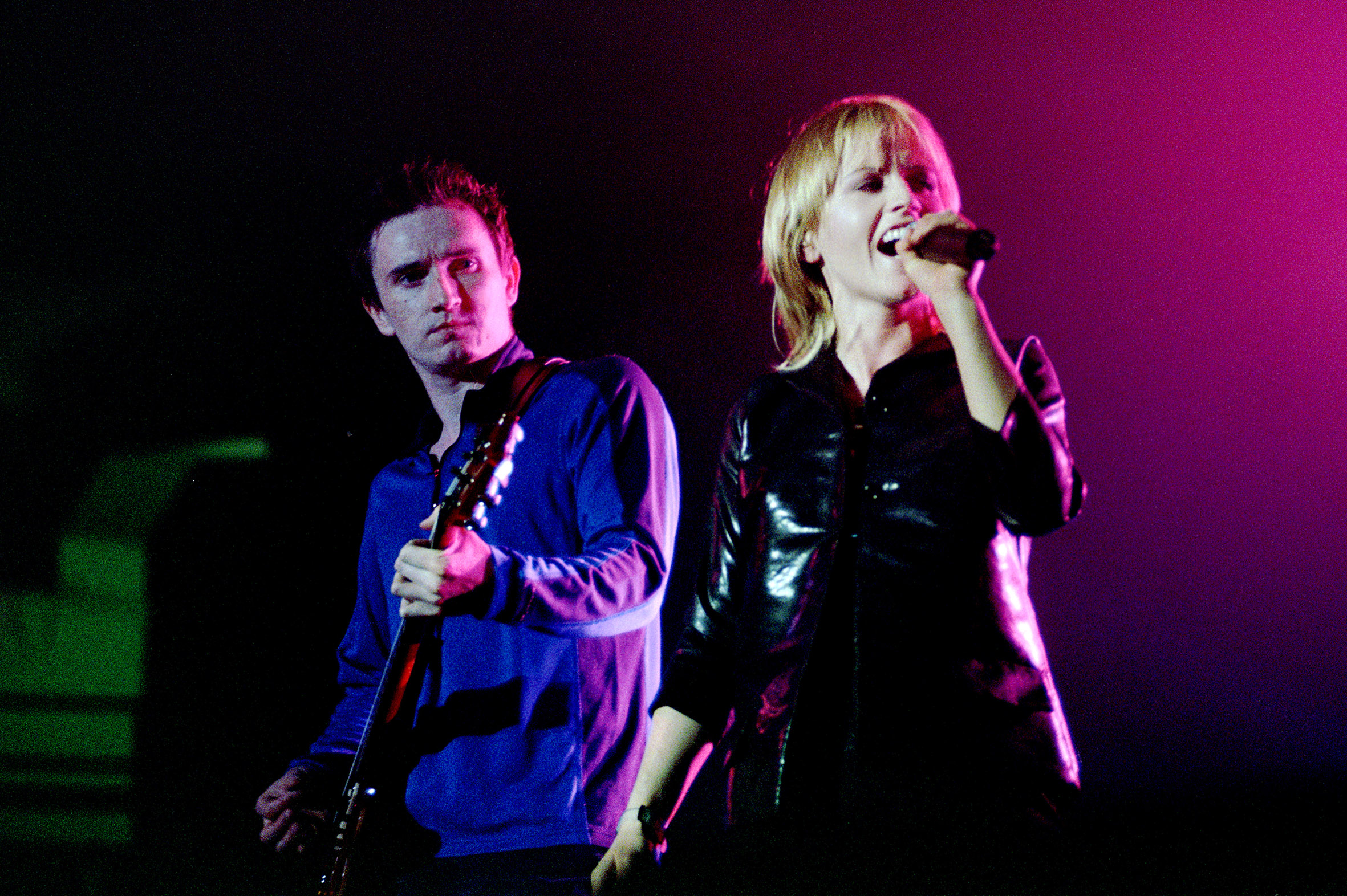
The Cranberries

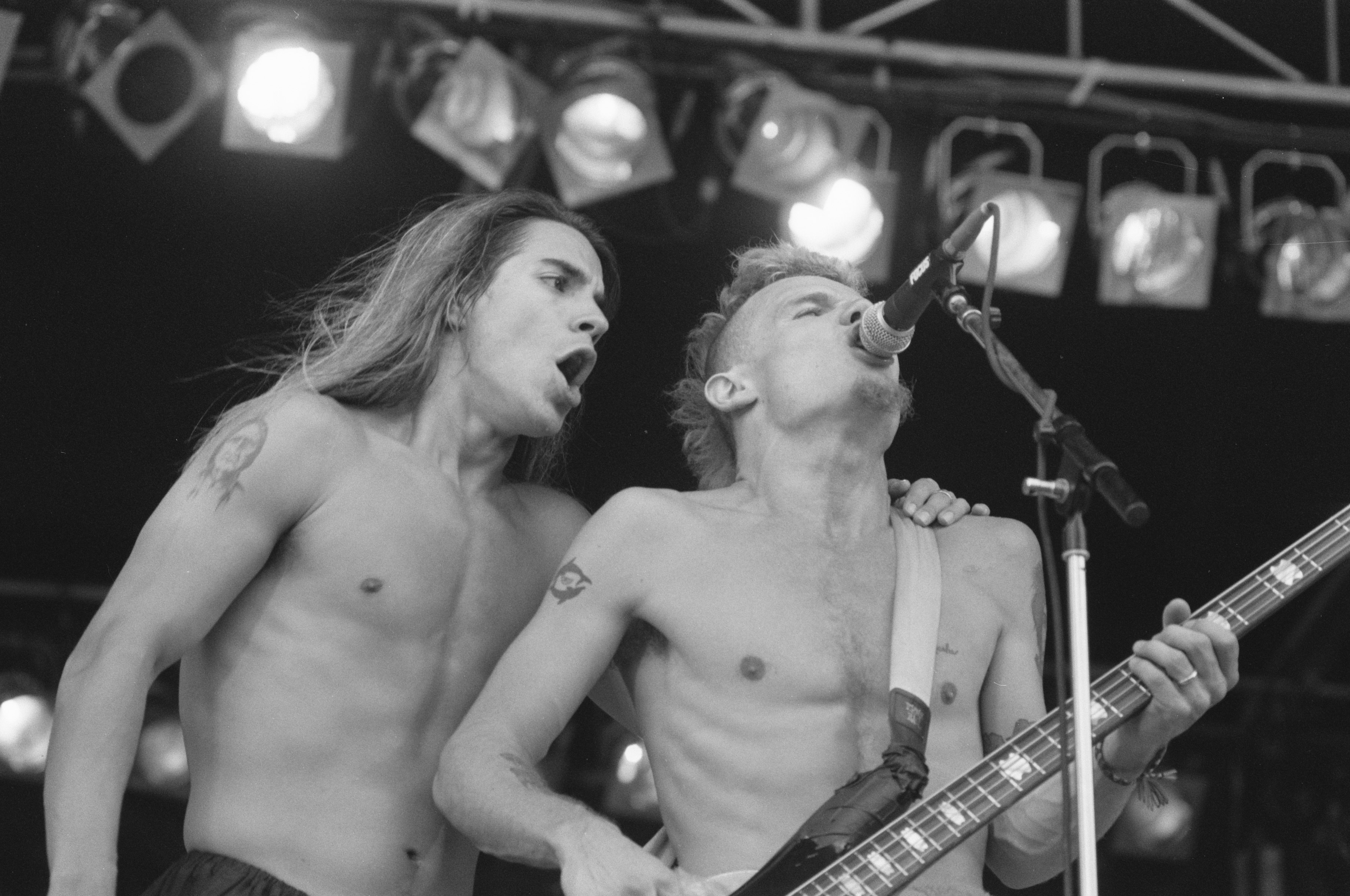
Red Hot Chili Peppers

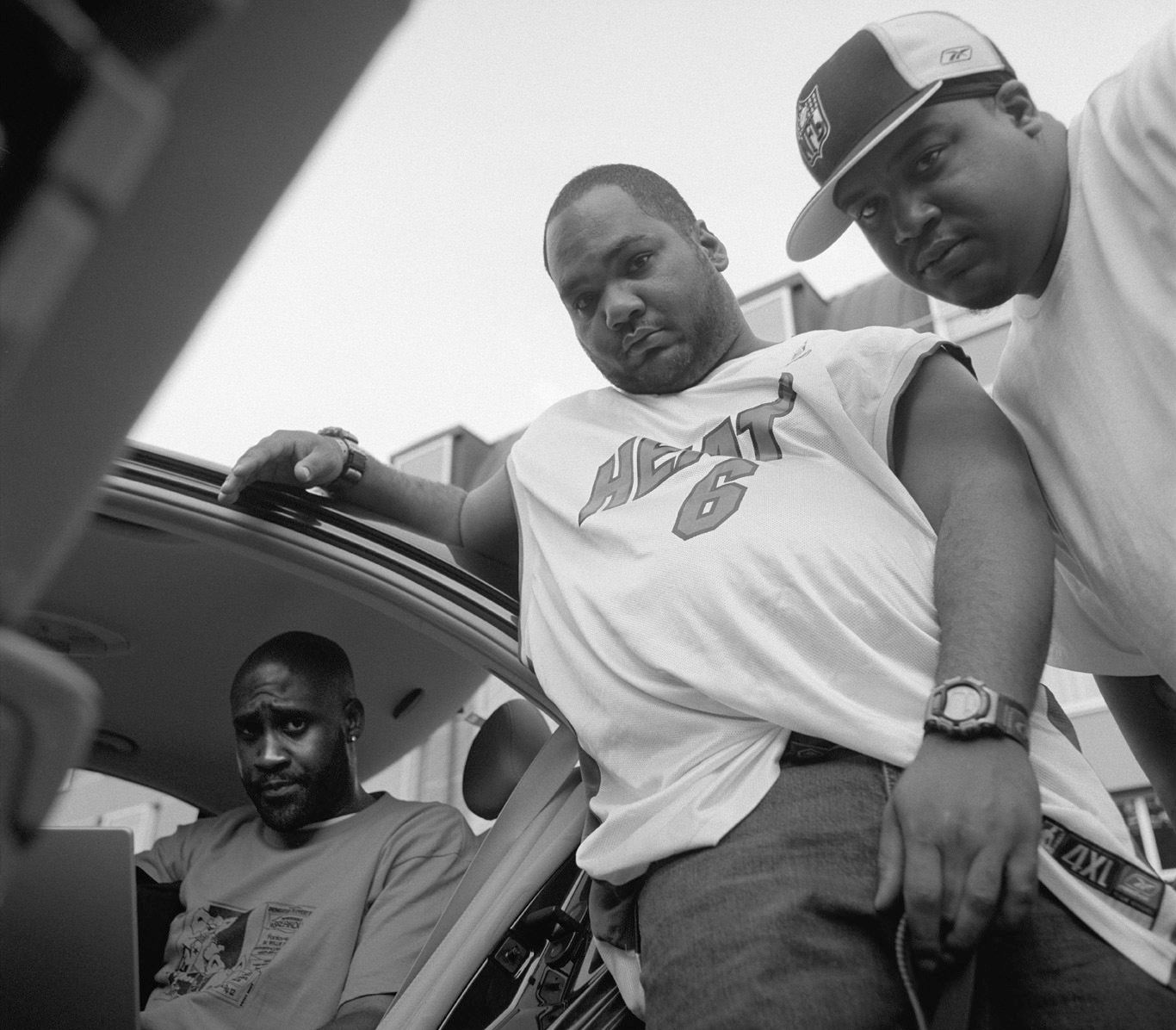
De La Soul

== See also ==
- List of decades, centuries, and millennia
- 1990s in music
- 1990s in fashion
- 1990s in television
- 1990s in science and technology
- 1990s in video gaming
- List of years in literature § 1990s

=== Timeline ===
The following articles contain timelines that list the most prominent events of the decade:

1990 • 1991 • 1992 • 1993 • 1994 • 1995 • 1996 • 1997 • 1998 • 1999
