= List of Miraculous: Tales of Ladybug & Cat Noir characters =

The following is a list of characters that appear in Miraculous: Tales of Ladybug & Cat Noir.

== The Miraculous ==
The Miraculers are a French superhero team who wear magical jewels called Miraculouses. They primarily fight against villains created by the holder of the Butterfly Miraculous, whose jewel allows the user to mind control individuals and give them superpowers. The team is led by Ladybug and was founded by Master Fu.

=== Marinette Dupain-Cheng / Ladybug ===
Marinette Dupain-Cheng is a 14-year-old student of French, Chinese, and Italian descent at Françoise Dupont High School. As the superhero Ladybug, she utilizes the Ladybug Miraculous to defeat opponents with her 'Lucky Charm' ability. She also has the ability to undo damage and heal injuries caused by enemies affected by the Butterfly Miraculous.

For much of the series Marinette is in love with her classmate Adrien Agreste, but is unaware that he is her crime-fighting partner Cat Noir. Adrien meanwhile is in love with Ladybug and is unaware that she is actually Marinette.

Her villains forms are Heartfixer, a supervillain who could presumably mend the broken hearts of others by hitting them with an energy projectile. And Nemesis, a archangel-themed supervillain who can petrified her target into stone.

=== Adrien Agreste / Cat Noir ===
Adrien Agreste (voiced by Bryce Papenbrook in the English dub, and Benjamin Bollen in the French version with his singing voice in the film voiced by Drew Ryan Scott in the English dub and Elliott in the French version) is the titular co-protagonist of the series. Adrien once was a fashion model for his father Gabriel's clothing brand; he often struggles with his father's emotional distance. (Note: "Webisode: Adrien's Double Life". Miraculous: Tales of Ladybug and Cat Noir (Webisodes). Episode 5. 2 February 2016. Event occurs at 00:25. Nickelodeon. Archived from the original on 31 January 2016. "[Adrien] Actually, I mostly do it [modeling] to make my father happy. Ever since Mom disappeared, he hasn't been the same." Alt URL) Using the Cat Miraculous, Adrien can transform into Ladybug's partner "Cat Noir". He wields the destructive ability "Cataclysm", which can decay anyone or anything with a touch. He is later revealed to be a humanoid sentimonster created by his mother with the emotion of love and his amok is in the Graham de Vanily Twin Rings.

His villain forms include:

- Cat Blanc - An akumatized version of Cat Noir with the power of infinite destruction. He was akumatized in an alternate timeline that split from the main one after Adrien figured out Ladybug's secret identity.
- Ephemeral - A supervillain with the power to speed up the time it takes for a young Miraculer to transform back into their civilian self. He was akumatized in an alternate timeline that split from the main one when Marinette and Adrien revealed their identities to each other.
- Extinguisher - A supervillain with the power to burn the pain of heartbreak. He was akumatized for a brief period after feeling heartbroken that Marinette broke up with him. He immediately rejected the akumatization when Chrysalis asked him if he was Cat Noir.

=== Alya Césaire / Rena Rouge ===
Alya Césaire / Rena Rouge (voiced by Carrie Keranen in the English dub and Fanny Bloc in the French version) is Marinette's best friend. She is in a relationship with Nino Lahiffe. Alya constantly helps Marinette with her problems, most of which pertained to Marinette trying to speak to Adrien; she is often seen helping or encouraging her. She aspires to be a journalist and is in charge of the school blog. She is a big fan of superheroes, in particular, Ladybug; she even operates a fansite known as the Ladyblog. Alya was initially unaware of Marinette's double life until the episode "Gang of Secrets" when Marinette discloses her identity as Ladybug to her. Since then, Alya continues to support Marinette in her new role as Guardian of the Miraculous.

She uses the Fox Miraculous to transform into "Rena Rouge" ("Red Fox") and possesses Mirage, an ability that can cast illusions. Although her identity is eventually revealed, Alya is called upon for support as Rena Rouge once before being eventually allowed to keep her Miraculous, assuming a blue-colored variant of her hero form called "Rena Furtive" ("Secret Fox") to protect her identity until she returns the Miraculous to Marinette once her identity is exposed again. In "Re-creation", Alya is given back the Fox Miraculous permanently and reunites with Trixx. In Season 6, in case Marinette has to step down as Guardian of the Miracle Box and her duties as Ladybug, she has Tikki give Alya a kwagatama to access her memories, dubbing Alya Marinette's deputy Guardian. Though this nearly becomes official after Marinette suffers being akumatized for the first time in "Heartfixer", Alya and Tikki reassure her she can still continue her duties as Ladybug and Guardian and Alya does not need to become Scarabella again for the time being. However, in the season finale, "Nemesis", Alya learns on her own of Gabriel being Monarch, leaving her friendship with Marinette permanently damaged because of the web of lies and deceit Marinette has spun to keep Adrien from finding out the truth himself, but agrees to remain as Marinette's deputy Guardian, Rena Rouge, and stand-in for Ladybug as Scarabella, but tells Marinette that she needs to be the one to tell Adrien the truth as Alya will not be a part of her continued deception from this point forward. However, early in Season 7, Marinette explains the full story to Alya, and horrified by Adrien's situation if the truth were to become public of his father's reasons for turning evil, she forgives Marinette and agrees to support her in keeping the truth hidden until Chrysalis is dealt with.

Her villain forms include:

- Lady Wifi - A supervillain whose smartphone can fire magical icons and allows her to teleport to any phone. Lady Wifi has sometimes teamed up with Princess Fragrance, Reflekta, and once with Horrificator and Timebreaker. She is the first villain to break free of Shadow Moth's control.
- Rena Rage - The akumatized form of "Rena Rouge".
- Oblivio - The fused form of Alya and Nino who can erase people's memories.

=== Nino Lahiffe / Carapace ===
Nino Lahiffe / Carapace (voiced by Ben Diskin in seasons 1–3 of the English dub Zeno Robinson starting with Miraculous World: New York: United Heroez of the English dub and Alexandre Nguyen in the French version is Adrien's best friend who dresses in skate punk fashion. He DJs at the school's radio station. He is in a relationship with Alya.

He uses the Turtle Miraculous to turn into "Carapace", wielding the shield ability Shellter. He also later learns that Alya is Rena Rouge. Although his identity is revealed to Hawk Moth, he is called upon for support as Carapace and also learns of Rena Furtive, Alya's second identity. He mistakenly reveals it publicly to the rest of the heroes and Shadow Moth.

In the fifth season, he forms a resistance network at Collège Françoise Dupont with all of his classmates to help Ladybug and Cat Noir in their war against Monarch. He receives the Turtle Miraculous permanently at the end of the fifth season once Monarch is defeated and reunites with Wayzz.

His villain forms are:

- Bubbler - A villain that can create and manipulate soap bubbles.
- Rocketear - A villain who can throw exploding tears from his eyes.
- Shell Shock - The akumatized form of Carapace.
- Oblivio - The fusion of Nino and Alya who can erase people's memories.

=== Luka Couffaine / Viperion ===
Luka Couffaine / Viperion (voiced by Andrew Russell in the English dub and Gauthier Battoue in the French version; also Couphène) is the twin brother of Juleka Couffaine. He was Marinette's temporary love interest and serves as her voice of comfort, even after they have broken up. He also becomes a reoccurring support to Ladybug as Viperion with his "Second Chance" ability allowing him to rewind time up to five minutes to fix a mistake. In the season 4 episode 'Wishmaker,' Luka discovers the secret identities of Ladybug and Cat Noir. He maintains this secret until season 5, when he leaves Paris to make sure that no one can exploit his knowledge.

In the final episode of season 5, he is revealed to have been trained by Su-Han in Tibet at the temple. After Monarch is defeated and gone, he returns to Paris and, like every other temporary Miraculous holder, gets the Snake Miraculous to keep.

Using the Snake Miraculous, Luka can transform into "Viperion". His special power "Second Chance", lets him rewind time up to five minutes to fix a mistake. But, as shown with other users, "Second Chance" does not reverse a holder's personal ailments.

Luka has had two villain forms:

- Silencer - A villain who can steal people's voices and imitate them by talking with his hands.
- Truth - A villain who can force people to tell the truth.

=== Kagami Tsurugi / Ryûko ===
Kagami Tsurugi / Ryûko (voiced by Faye Mata in the English dub and Clara Soares in the French version) is a Japanese teenage girl who is introduced in season 2. She hails from a family of celebrated fencers and often acts as Adrien's main opponent in his fencing classes. Like Adrien, she feels isolated and desires freedom from her strict and controlling mother, Tomoe. She also had feelings for Adrien and is thus presented as a rival for Marinette, however, the two eventually become friends. She temporarily becomes Adrien's love interest and maintain a good friendship even after they are broken up.

Kagami was the first person to notice Adrien's romantic feelings for Marinette, despite their parents' wanting her and Adrien to date each other, which eventually inspired Kagami to stand up to Tomoe. She also deduced Marinette's identity as Ladybug after hearing the latter panic-rant to Alya. She starts a relationship with Félix Fathom, Adrien's cousin, in Season 5 after he acquires the Peacock Miraculous.

She uses the Dragon Miraculous to transform into "Ryûko" ("Young Dragon"), which gives her the ability to transform into and control water, wind, and lightning. Although her identity is accidentally revealed, she is often called upon throughout the series.

In the sixth season, Kagami is revealed to be a humanoid Sentimonster created by her mother. She nearly gives up her Amok to Ladybug, only to change her mind.

Her villain forms include:

- Riposte - An armored samurai-like villain with a sword blade for a right hand who can slice through anything.
- Riposte Prime - An upgraded version of "Riposte" who in addition to her powers can also use the power of the Turtle Miraculous
- Oni-Chan - An oni-masked villain who can aggressively pursue anyone she has marked.
- Lies - A villain who can paralyze anyone who has lied.
- Ryukomori - A giant humanoid cloud with the power of the Dragon Miraculous.

=== Alix Kubdel / Bunnyx ===
Alix Kubdel / Bunnyx (voiced by Kira Buckland in the English dub and Adeline Chetail in the French version of Chronogirl and Marie Nonnenmacher onwards) is a tomboyish girl at Collège Françoise Dupont. She is of Amazigh origin. On Twitter, Thomas Astruc confirmed that she is aromantic.

Alix is predestined to receive the Rabbit Miraculous to become "Bunnyx" and able to travel through time with her ability Burrow, which summons portals. A future version of Alix, who is in her twenties, intervened in the present to maintain the ideal timeline for Ladybug and Cat Noir. An elderly version of herself in her 70s appeared in Miraculous London, showing that Alix will continue to be Bunnyx well into old age.

The present Alix had also been entrusted with the Dog Miraculous briefly to become Canigirl and helped the heroes take the Rabbit Miraculous back from Monarch. She was allowed to keep the latter as she left her time period to keep the Rabbit Miraculous safe, whilst traveling between other eras and keeping in contact with her loved ones by leaving them cards. Bunnyx knows the secret identities of Ladybug, Cat Noir, and Monarch.

Her villain form was Timebreaker, a time-themed villain on special rollerskates who can make people disappear by touching them which gives her the energy to travel through time. She has also teamed up with Lady Wifi, Reflekta, Princess Fragrance, and Horrificator, once.

=== Félix Fathom / Argos ===
Félix Fathom / Argos (voiced by Bryce Papenbrook in the English dub and Benjamin Bollen in the French version) is a Humanoid Sentimonster, Adrien's cousin, and Gabriel's nephew who lives with his mother Amélie in London. He is almost identical in appearance to Adrien. He was abused in his early childhood by his father Colt Fathom who died as the result of using the damaged Peacock Miraculous and spent his final moments tormenting him.

Acquiring his father's ring (which contains his Amok) to be fully independent, Félix cares for Adrien and intends to free him from his father and those like him who abuse their authority. He manages to steal Gabriel's ring and learns of his supervillain identity in the process, taking advantage of this when Ladybug unknowingly gave him the Dog Miraculous to become "Flairmidable". Félix blackmails his uncle into giving him the repaired Peacock Miraculous while giving his uncle back his ring along with the other Miraculous besides the ones owned by Ladybug and Cat Noir. After befriending Duusu, Félix uses the Peacock Miraculous to become "Argos". A remorseful Félix enters a relationship with Kagami after kidnapping her and learns Ladybug's identity from her, deciding to tell Marinette about his uncle's true identity. He joins the Miraculers at the end of season 5.

In season 6, he and Kagami attempt to entrust their rings containing their amoks to Marinette for safekeeping to ensure their continued existence as sentimonsters. After dealing with Tomoe akumatized into Yaksi Gozen and Felix being captured by her, they agree to hold onto their rings for the time being.

=== Zoé Lee / Vesperia ===
Zoé Lee / Vesperia (voiced by Deneen Melody in the English dub and Fily Keita in the French version season 4, then by Laure Filiu in season 5, then by Tiffany Hofstetter) is Chloé's maternal half-sister from New York who is naturally kind and gets along with the students of Miss Bustier's class. Zoé initially pretends to be mean and self-centered like her sister to be accepted by her family but ultimately chooses to be her own person. She later confesses to having a crush on Marinette, but accepts supporting her feelings for Adrien.

Using the Bee Miraculous, she can transform into "Vesperia". She is often called upon as part of the Miraculous team, acting as the successor for Queen Bee.

During Season 6, Zoé bumps into an old classmate from New York named Ray, who is surprised that her friends do not know what Zoé was like in New York. In the episode "Grendiaper", Zoé assumes the new identity of "Fury", a vigilante who targets those she believes deserves punishment until Ladybug talks her down.

Her villain form was Sole Crusher, a villain who could grow bigger by stepping on people.

=== Lê Chiến Kim / King Monkey ===
Lê Chiến Kim (also Kim Ature and Kim Nguyen (Note: in "Optigami")) / King Monkey (voiced by Grant George in the English dub and Alexandre Nguyen in the French version) is a competitive and athletic student at Collège Françoise Dupont, revealed to be a brief former crush of Marinette's. He is best friends with Max, and has a girlfriend named Ondine.

Using the Monkey Miraculous, he can transform into "King Monkey" (French: Roi Singe). (Note: Kim's monkey-themed superhero was based on Sun Wukong in Journey to the West.) His special power, Uproar, allows him to create an object of any sort to disrupt his opponents' superpowers.

In season seven, Kim's Monkey Miraculous is stolen by Chrysalis, causing all the Miraculers besides Ladybug and Cat Noir to reveal their identities to one another.

His villain forms include:

- Dark Cupid - An evil version of the mythological figure who spreads hate with his bow and arrows.
- Dark Humor - A variant of Dark Cupid who can cause people to pull pranks using the power of the Monkey Miraculous.

In the episode "Sleeping Syren", it's revealed that he has two fathers.

=== Max Kanté / Pegasus ===
Max Kanté / Pegasus (voiced by Benjamin Diskin in season 1–3 of the English dub, Zeno Robinson in Season 4 of the English dub and Martial Le Minoux in the French version) is an intelligent Malian-French student at Collège Françoise Dupont. He is best friends with Kim and is the creator of Markov. On Twitter, Thomas Astruc confirmed that he is asexual.

Using the Horse Miraculous, he can transform into "Pegasus" (French: Pegase), who sports white dreadlocks and boots with wing shapes on them. His weapon is a horseshoe-shaped boomerang and his special power "Voyage" lets him open up a portal to teleport to any location. It is revealed in the episode "Wreckless Driver" that Max is autistic.

His villain form is Gamer, a professional gamer-themed villain who has a real-life mecha that can upgrade itself if enough people are consumed by it. In another episode, he is upgraded into Gamer 2.0 who brings a tournament game to life where the players play as any of the akumatized villains. In the Miraculous Rise of the Sphinx video game, he becomes Gamer 3.0 who asks questions from the heroes.

=== Juleka Couffaine / Purple Tigress ===
Juleka Couffaine / Purple Tigress (voiced by Erin Fitzgerald in Season 1 of the English dub, Reba Buhr from Season 2 in the English dub and Marie Nonnenmacher in the French version) is a shy, quiet and reserved student at Collège Françoise Dupont who prefers to dress in goth fashion. She is the twin sister of Luka Couffaine. Juleka and Luka later learn that their biological father is Jagged Stone. Juleka is best friends and in a relationship with Rose Lavillant.

She is the holder of the Tiger Miraculous, transforming into "Purple Tigress". Her weapon is a bola whip and her special power "Clout" allows her to channel her energy into an extremely powerful punch.

Her main villain form was Reflekta, a mirror-themed villain who could make people look exactly like her with mirror beams mounted on her wrists and had been granted the power of the Tiger Miraculous on her seventh akumatization. Occasionally, those affected by her power would serve the same purpose as her. She has been akumatized into this form multiple times, once teaming up with Lady Wifi, Princess Fragrance, Horrificator and Timebreaker. She had been given two sentimonsters.

=== Rose Lavillant / Pigella ===
Rose Lavillant / Pigella (voiced by Erin Fitzgerald in Season 1 in the English dub, Reba Buhr from Season 2 in the English dub and Jessie Lambotte in the French version) is a student at Collège Françoise Dupont. She is best friends and in a relationship with Juleka Couffaine. She also suffers from an unknown chronic illness.

She sometimes uses the Pig Miraculous to transform into "Pigella". Her weapon is a tambourine and her special power "Gift" creates a gift box that opens to reveal an image of the target's deepest wish.

Her villain form was Princess Fragrance, a perfume-themed villain who could brainwash people with her perfume. She has sometimes teamed up with Lady Wifi and Reflekta, and once with Horrificator and Timebreaker to form the Gang of Secrets.

=== Mylène Haprèle / Polymouse ===
Mylène Haprèle / Polymouse (voiced by Jessica Gee-George in the English dub and Jessie Lambotte in the French version) is a meek and cordial student at Collège Françoise Dupont. She is an activist and also Ivan's girlfriend.

Using the Mouse Miraculous, she can transform into "Polymouse". Her weapon is a jump rope and her special power Multitude allows her to simultaneously shrink and duplicate herself.

Her villain form was Horrificator, a slimy monster who can grow in size by feeding on fear. She has also teamed up with Lady Wifi, Reflekta, Princess Fragrance, and Timebreaker as the Gang of Secrets.

=== Ivan Bruel / Minotaurox ===
Ivan Bruel / Minotaurox (voiced by Max Mittelman in season 2 in the English dub and Franck Tordjman in the French version) is a tough-looking but a kind student at Collège Françoise Dupont.

Using the Ox Miraculous, he can transform into "Minotaurox". His weapon is a hammer and his special power Resistance renders him invulnerable to physical attacks and other superpowers.

He is in a relationship with Mylène. It is later revealed that his father Raul was the supervillain El Toro. However, Ivan intends to not be like his father. After his father's akumatization and Ladybug's encouragement, Ivan stands up to him and encourages him to change his ways.

His villain form was Stoneheart, a giant rock monster who grew bigger when hit.

=== Nathaniel Kurtzberg / Caprikid ===
Nathaniel Kurtzberg / Caprikid (voiced by Michael Sinterniklaas in the English dub and by Franck Tordjman in the French version) is a shy, Jewish-French comic book artist. His first name is a homage to Nathanaël Bronn, the chief art director of the series, while his last name is a homage to famous comic book artist Jack Kirby, birth name Jacob Kurtzberg. He is in a relationship with Marc Anciel.

Using the Goat Miraculous, he can transform into "Caprikid". His weapon is a paintbrush staff and his special power "Genesis" allows him to create any object he can imagine.

In season 6 he fights his akumatized mother and finally gets his parents' approval for his comics, he reveals his superhero identity to Marc, to which Marc does the same.

His villain form was Evillustrator, an artist-themed villain who could draw and erase things in real life with his graphics tablet.

=== Marc Anciel / Roosterbold ===
Marc Anciel / Roosterbold (voiced by Kyle McCarley, later Alejandro Saab in the English dub and Alexandre Nguyen in the French version) is a shy writer who is a student at Collège Françoise Dupont. According to Thomas Astruc and Feri González, Marc is based upon Hope Morphin, a personal friend of Astruc who is both genderfluid and bisexual, and that Marc also identifies as part of the LGBT community. He and Nathaniel collaborate on writing a comic book.

Using the Rooster Miraculous, he can transform into "Roosterbold". His weapon is a quill and his special power "Sublimation" gives him any superpower he wants.

In season 6, he reveals his superhero identity to Nathaniel, to which Nathaniel does the same.

His villain form is Reverser, a villain who can reverse any of his victims' personality traits while flying on a paper plane-type mode of transportation.

=== Sabrina Raincomprix / Miss Hound ===
Sabrina Raincomprix / Miss Hound (voiced by Marieve Herington in season 1 of the English dub, Cassandra Lee Morris in season 2–3, Lauren Landa in season 4 onward of the English dub and Marie Nonnenmacher in the French version) is Chloé's former "best friend" and former personal assistant, who is treated as a slave. While she remained by Chloé's side out of being friendless by association, Sabrina eventually ends their "friendship" as a result of Chloé's actions under Lila's guidance.

She uses the Dog Miraculous to transform into "Miss Hound". Her weapon is a ball and her special power "Fetch" allows her to transport any object that has come into contact with her ball into her possession.

In season 6, upon having some difficulty after first following Chloé's departure, Sabrina officially befriends Marinette and others while gaining a different hairstyle and outfit, along with a new costume as Miss Hound.

Her villain forms include:

- Vanisher - An invisible villain. At one point, Vanisher has been granted the power of the Dog Miraculous.
- Miraculer - A villain who can steal the heroes' powers to use for herself.

== Antagonists ==
=== Gabriel Agreste ===
Gabriel Agreste / Hawk Moth / Shadow Moth / Monarch (born Gabi Grassette; voiced by Keith Silverstein in the English dub and Antoine Tomé in the French version) was a famous fashion designer, and Adrien's strict and emotionally abusive father. He served as the main antagonist for the first five seasons, his motives being to obtain Ladybug and Cat Noir's Miraculouses so he can use their combined power to restore his comatose wife Émilie. He used the Butterfly Miraculous to transform into the supervillain "Hawk Moth", who can use his butterflies to akumatize someone using their negative emotions and transform them into his superpowered minions. Gabriel and Hawk Moth weren't confirmed to be the same person until the second season.

In the fourth season, he became "Shadow Moth" by unifying the Butterfly and Peacock Miraculouses, allowing him to use the ability of Amokization as well and later makes Megakumas that can nullify Ladybug's Magical Charms.

In the fifth season, Gabriel acquires every Miraculous in the Miracle Box besides the Ladybug and Cat from Félix. He then unifies the Butterfly, Fox, and Turtle Miraculouses, assuming the alias "Monarch". After losing the Rabbit Miraculous to the heroes and being inflicted with a Cataclysm-induced necrosis, Gabriel partners with Tomoe Tsurugi to develop the 'Alliance System,' incorporating the Miraculous jewels into smart rings to distribute powers to Akumatized people. In his final battle with Ladybug, Monarch learns her identity but is robbed of the Butterfly Miraculous in the process. Realizing that he ruined Adrien's life, Gabriel takes the Ladybug and Cat Miraculous and sacrifices his life to heal Nathalie with their power.

The sixth season reveals that Gabriel operated as "The Diamond" in the Kingdom, a secret society of people who desire the Ladybug and Cat Miraculouses in order to make a perfect world for themselves. They had known about Gabriel's supervillain identity and that Ladybug covered it up.

Gabriel has akumatized himself into different villains:

- Collector - A villain who can trap anything in his sketchbook. Gabriel used the Collector identity to lead Ladybug and Cat Noir astray when they nearly discovered him.
- Nightormentor - A villain with the power of the Horse Miraculous and the ability to induce nightmares. In his second akumatization, he used the Mouse, Horse, and Rooster Miraculouses to induce nightmares for his final plan.

In Ladybug & Cat Noir: The Movie, Hawk Moth's plans are still intact. But unlike the TV series version, this one surrendered upon learning that Cat Noir is his son. After surrendering the Butterfly Miraculous to Ladybug and Cat Noir, Gabriel turns himself in for his crimes as Hawk Moth and is sent to prison.

=== Lila Rossi ===
Lila Rossi / Cerise Bianca / Chrysalis (voiced by Lisa Kay Jennings in the English dub and Clara Soares in the French version) is a compulsive liar who craves attention and uses dishonest means to get it while acting under false identities and exploiting numerous families. She is first introduced as "Lila Rossi", an Italian diplomat's daughter, and becomes one of Ms. Bustier's students. She has a vendetta against Ladybug for calling her out on her lie of them being friends to get close to Adrien, and later Marinette for trying to inform their classmates.

Lila's villain forms are:

- Volpina - A copy of a Fox Miraculous holder with the ability to create illusions.
- Chameleon - A villain who can shapeshift into anyone by kissing them.
- Hoaxer - An upgraded version of Volpina with the power of the Fox Miraculous and the added ability to hack into the Alliance's system and brainwash people with her posts.

To this end, having secretly deduced Hawk Moth's identity, Lila eventually partners with Gabriel to keep tabs on Adrien as a means to akumatize those she manipulates, and later joins forces with Chloé as well, until she abandoned and betrayed her. She became a scanned model alongside Adrien to create the virtual assistants in his Alliance Rings. But when Gabriel terminates their agreement by replacing her with Kagami, Lila decides to acquire blackmail on Gabriel in retaliation before falling back to another school under the alias "Cerise Bianca" after being exposed as a fraud in Collège Françoise Dupont as she reunites with some old classmates there.

After Gabriel's death, Lila seizes the Butterfly Miraculous. Lila decides to play the long game to uncover Ladybug's identity, using the Butterfly Miraculous to become "Chrysalis". She akumatizes people to serve as distractions while concealing her name and identity with an androgynous mental image. Late in the sixth season, it is retroactively revealed that the Butterfly Miraculous gives Lila shapeshifting abilities, which she used to spy on Marinette.

In the seventh season, she shifts from uncovering Ladybug's identity to uncovering Cat Noir's identity. She reveals to him that Gabriel Agreste was Monarch, but he does not believe her. She begins telling her akumatized victims her alias as "Chrysalis" and retires the mental image. She manages to discover King Monkey's secret identity and steals the Monkey Miraculous, allowing her to impersonate him and figure out where the Miraculers' secret base is. Later, she is revealed to have stolen Gabriel's tablet, which contains the secret identities of some of the Miraculers. Her powers are exposed by Ladybug in a news report, causing people across Paris to suspect anyone of being Chrysalis.

=== Nathalie Sancœur ===
Nathalie Sancœur / Mayura (voiced by Sabrina Weisz in the English dub and Marie Chevalot in the French version) is Gabriel Agreste's personal assistant. She willfully assisted him in his goals, both as Gabriel and Hawk Moth. She served as the secondary antagonist until the beginning of the season 5.

Her initial villain form is Catalyst, who has the power to boost Hawk Moth into "Scarlet Moth" who can make multiple Akumas. Using the Peacock Miraculous, she can transform into "Mayura", and has the ability to create minions with her feathers, known as Amokization. Because her Miraculous is damaged, she becomes bedridden, which continues even after the Miraculous is repaired. In later episodes, she is recovering slowly and uses leg braces.

In season five, Nathalie refuses to aid Gabriel in his plans following his first defeat as Monarch because he was too obsessed with the Ladybug and Cat Miraculous to prevent Émilie's coma through the Rabbit Miraculous. However, she remains in the Agreste family's employment to protect Adrien while reluctantly helping Gabriel in concern for his failing health. Nathalie is also akumatized into Safari, a hunter who uses the power of the Goat Miraculous to create hunting gear that emulates the abilities of other Miraculouses. Her sickness is cured after Gabriel sacrificed himself for her.

In season six, Nathalie and her father are shown to be associated with a secret society that is targeting Ladybug and Cat Noir's Miraculouses.

=== Chloé Bourgeois ===
Chloé Bourgeois / Queen Bee (voiced by Selah Victor in the English dub and Marie Chevalot in the French version) is a former student in Miss Bustier's class. She is selfish and spoiled, only showing a little remorse when she needs to. She often abuses her father's status as mayor to do whatever she wants like tormenting Marinette, despite being a fan of her alter-ego, and bossing around her friend Sabrina Raincomprix while claiming her childhood best friend Adrien Agreste as her boyfriend. Chloé either instigates someone getting Akumatized or gets Akumatized herself, her initial form being a Ladybug-themed opposite called Antibug. Chloé accidentally acquired the Bee Miraculous which transforms her into Queen Bee, and has the ability Venom, which allows her to paralyze a target with a sting. Despite publicly revealing her secret identity, Ladybug would occasionally lend her the Miraculous, but is later forced to suspend her from heroics when her public identity becomes too much of a liability. Twice when she was Queen Bee, she got akumatized into the Queen Bee opposite Queen Wasp. After growing paranoid and resentful of Ladybug for not giving her the Miraculous as she wished, Chloé betrays the heroes to Hawk Moth, gets akumatized into Miracle Queen, and exposes other temporary heroes to him, resulting in her being permanently relieved of duty.

Afterwards, Chloé descends into villainy, and later allies herself with Lila Rossi out of mutual hatred for both Ladybug and Marinette. She also ends up meeting her half-sister Zoé. During this time, she was akumatized into the banana-themed Queen Banana and the duplicating Penalty. Chloé's actions gradually make her hated by most of Paris and eventually cost her both Adrien and Sabrina as friends. When her father steps down as mayor, Chloé becomes Monarch's puppet ruler through Lila's manipulation by staging a Coup d'état. She uses her power as acting mayor to criminalize superpowered beings, with Ladybug and Cat Noir branded outlaws while forced to allow it, But Chloé later accepts Monarch's offer to become secretly akumatized as the mayor-themed Queen Mayor to enforce her rule via channeling multiple Miraculous powers through her robots, culminating in her trapping Ladybug and Cat Noir while attempting to publicly expose their identities. But gets defeated, stripped of her position and all her power, and abandoned and betrayed by her allies, with her father sending her and her mother away from Paris. Audrey chastises her for ruining the family name and vows to take control of her life and education again.

While living in London during season six, Chloè becomes a social media influencer. Despite her operating in London and unwelcome status in Paris, she manages to gain a degree of popularity and a small following and uses her platform to promote contests, give updates about her new life, and throw shade at heroes, villains, and her former classmates. In "Queen of the Dreadzone", Chloé returns to Paris to film a movie, only to be humiliated by Marinette. Chrysalis akumatizes Chloè into Dread Queen, whose Dread Zone makes people experience their worst fear. After being defeated and un-akumatized, Chloé leaves Paris under Mayor Bustier's orders.

=== Kingdom ===
The Kingdom is a secret society that Gabriel Agreste was a part of. They each want to obtain Ladybug and Cat Noir's Miraculous for their own personal wishes and to complete the Perfect World Project. Each member has an operative called a "Shadow" that serves them.

==== The Scepter ====
"The Scepter" is the leader of the Kingdom.

==== Camilo Pista ====
Camilo Pista (voiced by Lex Lang in the English dub and Serge Biavan in the French version) is the father of Nathalie and member of the Kingdom's council who operates as "The Stomach". His reveals his true appearance and gets akumatized in the seventh season.

==== Tomoe Tsurugi ====
Tomoe Tsurugi (voiced by Minae Noji in the English dub and Jeanne Chartier in the French version) is Kagami and Lila's overprotective mother and a world-renowned fencer who is the CEO of Tsurugi Industries. She is a business partner and friends with Gabriel Agreste, and like him, is very strict with her daughter, although occasionally allows her more freedom. She is the only character in the series to be blind, and is seen wearing black sunglasses and using a kendo sword as a walking stick, while using a self-driving voice-activated car called Tatsu. She enters a partnership with Gabriel in the fifth helping him develop the Alliance System with the intent on using the Miraculouses for her own personal benefit.

Her villain forms are:

- Ikari Gozen - A giant samurai-armored centaur-like villain fused with Tatsu who wields a giant bokken and the ability to trap people inside her stomach. When Tomoe used an Alliance Ring prototype as Ikari Gozen, she possessed the abilities of the Mouse Miraculous.
- Matagi Gozen - An archer-themed and upgraded version of Ikari Gozen who is not bound to Tatsu and has been granted the powers of the Bee, Horse, Mouse, Tiger and Rooster Miraculouses.
- Yaksi Gozen - Another upgraded version of Ikari Gozen who wields a boken and has a moving mouth on its torso.

After Gabriel's death in the recreated universe, she announces her intention to continue his legacy.

Tomoe is revealed to be part of the Kingdom's council under the codename "The Machine". After Gabriel's death, she takes Nathalie in as her Shadow while planning to continue Gabriel's job. In addition, Cerise sides with her. Tomoe's blindness is revealed to be the result of her using the Peacock Miraculous to create Kagami. She obtained cybernetic eyes, which are hidden by her dark sunglasses.

==== Noé Luxus ====
Noé Luxus (voiced by Christopher Corey Smith in the English dub and Martin Faliu in the French version) is the son of Audrey Bourgeois, and maternal half-brother of Chloé and Zoé. He is also the chairman of Luxus Corp and successor to Gabriel Agreste's position of "The Diamond" in the Kingdom. Luxus becomes a shareholder to TVi and replaces Nadja Chamack with Mr. Banana.

Luxus is also the mastermind behind Chloé's career as a social media influencer, using her career to spread evil as a trend. He did this as part of Audrey's plans to regain control of Chloé's life even though Audrey is not familiar with the trend.

== Supporting characters ==
- Wang Fu / Jade Turtle (voiced by Paul St. Peter in the English dub and Gilbert Lévy in the French version; Chinese: 王富 Wáng Fu), is the former Guardian of the Miraculous. He claims that he is 186 years old. He used to help Marinette and Adrien by giving them Miraculouses to loan and creating potions to help them defeat tough villains. Prior to the events of the series, when Fu was still a guardian-in-training, he created a sentimonster that accidentally destroyed the Guardians' temple, with the Butterfly and Peacock Miraculouses, as well as a spellbook, lost in the chaos. However, the damage is later undone. When Hawk Moth learns his identity, Fu turns into a turtle hero named "Jade Turtle" to protect himself. However, he is overpowered, so he transfers the title of Guardian to Marinette, losing all his memories in the process. He departs Paris with his old love Marianne Lenoir, and they marry. In one episode, Fu and Marianne return to Paris and he is akumatized as Furious Fu, a tall, artist-themed supervillain who can bring words to life with his talismans.
- Sabine Cheng (Note: In China, married women keep their birth family names and their children take the father's name.) (voiced by Philece Sampler in season 1–3 of the English dub, Anne Yatco in season 4 of the English dub and Jessie Lambotte in the French version) is Marinette's mother, a baker, an co-proprietor of The Tom & Sabine Boulangerie Pâtisserie. She was born in China as Cheng Xia Bing before taking the name Sabine when she moved to Paris. Her main villain form is Qilin, an armored villain who can move things with her mind and control the wind. She has once teamed up with Weredad, Befana, and Bakerix as the Dearest Family. By the end of season six, Marinette reveals to her and Tom that she is Ladybug. They start supporting her from then on, even after she reveals why she hid from Adrien about Gabriel being Monarch.
- Tom Dupain (voiced by Christopher Corey Smith in the English dub and Martial Le Minoux in the French version) is a Marinette's father, a baker, and the co-proprietor of the Tom & Sabine Boulangerie Pâtisserie. He is very passionate about working there, often helping Marinette while she is at the bakery and showing her how to do things. He is named after Thomas Astruc, the creator of the series. His villain form is Weredad, a werewolf-like villain who can control thorny vines. He has once teamed up with Qilin, Befana, and Bakerix as the Dearest Family. By the end of season six, Marinette reveals to him and Sabine that she is Ladybug. They start supporting her from then on, even after she reveals why she hid from Adrien about Gabriel being Monarch. Tom appears as Weredad in the Miraculous Rise of the Sphinx video game, where he controls paper instead of vines.
- Placide I.T. (voiced by Ezra Weisz in the English dub and Guilbert Lévy in the French version), nicknamed "Gorilla" by Adrien and his friends, is the bodyguard and chauffeur of the former. He has a massive exterior and never speaks at all, only communicating through grunts and expressions. Placide cares for Adrien's safety and happiness and almost never leaves his side. His villain form is Gorizilla, a giant blue gorilla with a keen sense of smell.
- Caline Bustier (voiced by Dorothy Elias-Fahn in the English dub and Jessie Lambotte in the French version) is the teacher for Marinette and Adrien's class at Collège François Dupont who teaches French, poetry, and literature. Her villain form is Zombizou, a zombie-like person who can spread a zombie-like infection through kissing. She has also been akumatized into Miss Sans-Culotte, who can turn people into balloons, and has the Pig Miraculous's power of Jubilation. In the Miraculous World: New York special, she is revealed to be pregnant. In the fifth season, Bustier becomes the new Mayor of Paris after André steps down, turning the city environmentalist as a result of Gabriel's wish recreating the universe and also giving birth to a daughter, which she named Harmonie.
- Denis Damocles (voiced by J.C. Hyke in the English dub and Gilbert Lévy in the French version) is the principal of Collège François Dupont who is a fan of the American superhero Knightowl, roleplaying as a superhero called "The Owl". His often clumsy attempts to do good are often played for comic relief. Damocles' villain form is the Dark Owl, an owl-themed supervillain with real gadgets and tools that are summoned to him after his computer A.I. Albert is also akumatized. He was also akumatized into an upgraded version of Dark Owl called Darker Owl, who was given the power of the Pig Miraculous. He eventually steps down as principal in the fifth season following the scandal caused by Lila and Chloè, having believed the former's lies and being intimidated by the latter's father to let his daughter have her way. Following the recreation of the universe from Gabriel's wish, Damocles becomes the principal of Collège Françoise Dupont where Marinette and her friends are attending.
- Olga Mendeleiev (voiced by Philece Sampler in the first four seasons of the English dub and Marie Chevalot in the French version) is a science teacher and math teacher at Collège François Dupont who becomes acting principal in the fifth season after Mr. Damocles resigns. She is shown to be a strict teacher. Her villain form is Kwamibuster, who uses a special vacuum to capture the kwamis and intends to prove their existence to the world.
- Armand D'Argencourt (voiced by Joe Fria in the English dub and Thierry Kazazian in the French version) is the gym teacher of Collège Françoise Dupont who also teaches fencing. He is a descendant of the warrior Darkblade, who once ruled France. Armand is also a former mayoral candidate, although his campaign lost miserably to Mayor Bourgeois, and later to Caline Bustier. His villain form is Darkblade, a knight-themed villain who can turn people into knights that obey his every command. In season six, he was offended by the Glass Pyramid in front of the Louvre and is akumatized into the castle-themed villain Dark Castle.
- Socqueline Wang (voiced by Ryan Bartley in the English dub and Céline Melloul in the French version) is a friend and former schoolmate of Marinette. She helps run her family's art store. Socqueline is also of Chinese descent. She is a skilled gymnast. Socqueline is a year older than Marinette, being in her first year of high school at Lycée Claude-Monet, and helped Marinette deal with Chloé's bullying while they went to school together. She wishes to be like Ladybug and even impersonates her but Ladybug convinces her to stop after telling her of the potential dangers. Before the event of the series, Socqueline is shown to be Marinette's best friend, having defended her from Chloé as best as she could despite not being in the same year as Marinette. However, because of Chloe, Socqueline is suspended for the rest of the school year.
- Markov (voiced by Grant George in the English dub and Alexandre Nguyen in the French version) is a small, flying robot created by Max. He is very intelligent and capable of experiencing human emotions. His villain form is Robostus, a villainous robot who can bring mechanical devices to life. He is the first villain to successfully turn against Hawk Moth since Robustus wanted to use the Miraculous for himself. In the episode "Hack-San", Markov is hacked by the eponymous Sentimonster Hack-San and akumatized back into Robustus. His powers are modified so that he can brainwash people into giving up their prized possessions.
- André Bourgeois (voiced by Joe Ochman in the English dub and Gilbert Lévy in the French version) is Audrey's ex-husband, Chloé's father, Zoé's ex-stepfather, and the mayor of Paris for the first five seasons while also the proprietor of Le Grand Paris Hotel. He initially started off as a film director, but switched careers to politics like his father to better provide for Audrey. After she left the family and moved to New York, he tried to compensate for her absence by spoiling Chloé immensely, playing a big part in turning her into the brat that she is currently. Throughout most of the series, André acts as a doormat towards Chloé, with her often using her influence as the Mayor's daughter to get her own way, punish others no matter how unreasonable the situation, and keep herself out of trouble. When Audrey returns to Paris, André finds himself catering to her whims as well, especially in instances where the two gang up on him to get what they want. His villain form is Maledictator, a dictator-themed supervillain who can compel anyone hit by his spheres to obey his every command. André and Audrey do eventually agree to try and work on their marriage after their brief time akumatized into the two-faced Heart Hunter. When Audrey's other daughter Zoé comes to live with them in the fourth season, André bonds with her over a shared love of the film arts. A combination of Chloé forcing him to unjustly fire Ms. Bustier and Gabriel scandalizing him with doctored footage causes André to step down as mayor. When Chloé was thwarted by Marinette, André has her and Audrey leave Paris. After Gabriel sacrifices his life to revive his wife which rewrote history, André is removed from power and succeeded by Ms. Bustier. In season six, André is revealed to have become the owner of La Sabornne. In season seven, André gets akumatized into the love-stealing Dislove during the anniversary of his divorce from Audrey.
- Audrey Bourgeois (voiced by Haviland Stillwell in the English dub and Céline Melloul in the French version) is Chloé Bourgeois and Zoé Lee's mother, and a world-renowned fashion designer who owns Style Queen Magazine. She acts distantly to Chloé and often fires her subordinates. Her villain form is Style Queen, who is made of glitter, can turn people into glitter, and can regenerate her body. She has also become the two-faced Heart Hunter with André. She has a close relationship with Gabriel Agreste, claiming that she discovered and popularized his designs. In the fifth season, Audrey leaves Paris with Chloé. Furious at Chloé for disgracing their family name, Audrey vows to take control of Chloé's life from here on out, including her education when they are forced to relocate to London. Audrey is later revealed to be the mother of Noé Luxus.
- Butler Jean (voiced by Benjamin Diskin in the English dub and Martial le Minoux in the French version), real name Armand, is a butler employed at the Le Grand Paris hotel. He is usually seen serving Chloé and her family; the former and her mother constantly mistreat him and address him with different names (e.g. Jean-Paul, Jean-Eudes, and Jean-Pierre); his real last name is unknown. His villain form is Despair Bear, a small supervillain who controls a teddy bear from the inside and can mind control anyone he touches.
- Jagged Stone (voiced by Lex Lang in the English dub and Matthew Gèczy in the French version) is a popular rock music star heavily admired by Marinette and her peers. He is Luka and Juleka's father, and originally had a band named "Croco Duo" with their mother Anarka, but left both his family and band to pursue a solo career. His villain form is Guitar Villain, a rock music star-themed villain who is able to cast different spells by playing his guitar. He, along with Penny, accompanied Luka following his self-exile from Paris and trained to become a guardian under Su-han. He has since returned to Paris following Monarch's defeat.
  - Fang is Jagged Stone's pet crocodile. His akumatized form is a dragon who serves Guitar Villain.
- Penny Rolling (voiced by Mela Lee in the English dub and by Marie Chevalot in the French version) is Jagged Stone's music agent/personal assistant. She appears to have romantic feelings for Jagged, but it is unknown if they are reciprocated. Her villain form is Troublemaker who can switch between tangible and intangible by the clicking of her pen. In the Miraculous: Rise of the Sphinx video game, Penny is akumatized into Soundwave, who can generate harmful soundwaves. She, along with Jagged, accompanied Luka following his self-exile from Paris in season five and trained to become a guardian under Su-han. She has since returned to Paris following Monarch's defeat.
- Nadja Chamack (voiced by Sabrina Weisz in the English dub and Jessie Lambotte in the French version) is a TVi news reporter and Manon's mother. Her villain form is Prime Queen, a news reporter-themed villain who can teleport through digital screens. In season six, Nadja is fired when Noé Luxus buys out TVi and is replaced by Mr. Banana. She later appears on the social network mobile app Zoo.
- Manon Chamack (voiced by Stephanie Sheh in the English dub and Marie Nonnenmacher in the French version) is a little girl and Nadja's daughter who Marinette often babysits. She is depicted as being quite bratty and usually causes trouble for Marinette while she babysits her. Her villain form is Puppeteer, a puppeteer-themed villain who uses a wand and can control the people her dolls are based on. In one episode, she is upgraded into Puppeteer 2.0 and given the ability to animate wax statues.
- Roger Raincomprix (voiced by Christopher Corey Smith in the English dub and Martial Le Minoux in the French version) is a police officer and Sabrina's supportive father who works to uphold the law in Paris. Like his daughter towards Chloé, Roger often takes orders from Mayor Bourgeois. His villain form is Rogercop, an armored police officer-themed villain who can force people to enact whatever "sentences" he orders. Chrysalis later akumatized Roger into an upgraded form called Daddycop who forces people to appreciate Sabrina and rides a flying police car.
- Bob Roth (voiced by Grant George in the English dub and by Gilbert Lévy in the French version) is a greedy and selfish record producer and the owner of a record company named after himself called Bob Roth Records. Roth does a lot of projects to earn more money and is willing to fire any person if they do not bring him financial success. He was also formerly the record producer for Jagged Stone. Roth has also directed films and commercials and wishes to build a theme park featuring cloned dinosaurs. His first villain form is Moolak, a safe-themed villain who can turn people into coins and possesses golden safe-like armor that is filled with coins. His second villain form is the vinyl record-themed Gold Record who can turn everything into records with his vinyl, play their innermost thoughts, and has the power of the Horse Miraculous.
- Xavier Ramier (voiced by Todd Haberkorn in the English dub and by Franck Tordjman in the French dub) is a man who loves pigeons, to the point of acting like them. He is known for feeding pigeons in parks despite it being illegal, earning him the ire of Officer Raincomprix and other people. His villain form is Mr. Pigeon, a pigeon-themed villain who can control massive flocks of pigeons. Xavier's Mr. Pigeon form later got upgraded to turn people into pigeons.
- Nora Césaire (voiced by Laila Berzins in the English dub and by Céline Melloul in the French version) is a kickboxer who is the older sister of Alya. In season six, Nora goes to work at André Bourgeois' movie theater. Her villain form is Anansi, a spider-like villain who has six arms, immense strength, and the ability to generate webbing. In "Grendiaper", Nora helped out with security at Le Sorbonne. In "Sadnansi", Nora also worked as a cafeteria worker at Collège Françoise Dupont and met a fellow cafeteria worker named Twig. She was akumatized into an Anansi variant called Sadnansi where she can steal the love of other people and distribute it to someone else. She is also revealed to be Alya's half-sister due to having been born to a different father before being adopted by Otis.
- Ella & Etta Cesaire (both voiced by Cherami Leigh in the English dub and by Marie Nonnenmacher and Jessie Lambotte in the French version) are the two younger sisters of Alya Césaire, who are both often causing chaos and mayhem. Their primary villain form is Sapotis, a pair of gremlin-like villains who multiply whenever they eat. In season six, Ella and Etta get akumatized into the ink-powered Dirtifiers.
- Gina Dupain (voiced by Reba Buhr in the English dub and by Marie Chevalot in the French version) is Marinette's paternal grandmother. She is adventurous and free-spirited, having apparently traveled the world prior to the series. She wears a T-shirt with a print that is an allusion to The Dark Side of the Moon musical album by Pink Floyd. Her villain form is Befana, a witch-themed villain who has a flying motorcycle and the ability to turn people into coal statues or fairy servants. She has also teamed up with Qilin, Weredad, and Bakerix to form the Dearest Family. In "Riginarazione", Gina gets affected from the fact that Rolland has a weak heart on their combined birthday and is akumatized into the Befana variant Ringinarazione, who can change the age of anything or anyone, making them older or younger.
- Rolland Dupain (voiced by Paul St. Peter in the English dub and by Thierry Kazazian in the French version) is Marinette's estranged grandfather from Tom's side of the family. Like his son, he is a skilled baker and is obsessed with tradition. As such, he had a falling out with his son when he married Sabine, but eventually comes around and reunites with his family with help from Marinette. His main villain form is Bakerix, a bread/Gaul-themed villain who can get stronger by drinking yeast from his flask and has teamed up with Qilin, Weredad, and Befana to form the Dearest Family. He has also become Simpleman, a villain who can make people think and act like children by using his peel. In Season 6, in the episode "Riginarazione" just after turning 75, Rolland admits to his health deteriorating as his heart is failing and dies offscreen, but not before settling his affairs. Rolland dies with dignity and with no regrets for the life he lived. His pet mice are given to Gina and his belongings are divided amongst Marinette's family and Adrien.
- André Glacier (voiced by Ezra Weisz in the English dub and Philippe Roullier in the French version) is a friendly ice cream vendor, claiming that his ice cream can make any couple who eats it fall in love forever. He was a former office worker before he had a change of occupation. His villain form is Glaciator, a snowman-like villain who can turn people into ice cream.
- Ondine (voiced by Erika Harlacher in the English dub and Clara Soares in the French version) is a swimming student, often seen at the pool alongside Lê Chiến Kim. She is shown to have a crush on Kim, and despite his obliviousness to it the two eventually begin a relationship. Her villain form is Syren, an aquatic villain with flipper-like feet who floods Paris with her tears. She would later be akumatized into an upgraded form called Sleeping Syren who is mostly sleeping and is served by water knights who transform anyone who gets touched by their spear into toads.
- Anarka Couffaine (voiced by Erica Lindbeck in the English dub and Céline Melloul in the French version) is the mother of Juleka and Luka who lives on a houseboat called The Liberty. Her villain form is Captain Hardrock, a pirate-themed villain whose houseboat becomes a living pirate ship with weapons. While her ship was originally confined to the water, it later gains the ability to fly.
- Philippe (voiced by Joe Fria in the English dub and Philippe Candeloro in the French version) is a talented figure skating trainer who runs an ice rink in Paris. He and his three daughters, Luna, Maya, and Thalia, are based on and named after Philippe Candeloro and his children. His villain form is Frozer, an ice skater-themed villain who can produce ice from his ice skates.
- Lady Amélie Graham de Vanily (voiced by Laura Post in the English dub and by Jeanne Chartier in French version) is an aristocrat who is the mother of Félix, Émilie's sister, and Adrien's aunt. Unlike her sister, Amelie was obedient growing up and for that same reason, she married Colt Fathom and raised their son Félix after his death. While Amelie is kind and friendly with her sister's family, she has tried to convince Gabriel to give her the Graham de Vanily Twin Rings back, which are family heirlooms used as wedding rings for Émilie and Gabriel. In season 6, Amélie moves into Paris with Felix and is briefly akumatized into Lady Chaos, whose dome causes anyone who enters it to become chaotic. She appears to be aware of what really happened to Gabriel, and vows that she and Felix will be there to support Adrien when he learns the truth of his father's criminal actions.
- Grand Master Su-Han (voiced by Kaiji Tang in the English dub and by Gauthier Battoue in the French version) is the leader of the Order of Guardians, Master Fu's former teacher, and the former protector of the Chinese Miracle Box. He and the rest of the Guardians were trapped by Fu's sentimonster prior to the series, but after they were freed, he travels to Paris to recover the Miracle Box. He follows a strict code of rules and, like all Guardians, is trained in a special martial art called "Mirakung Fu" designed to combat rogue Miraculous holders. When he meets Marinette, he at first believes she is unable to be a Guardian, but later approves of her service. He also decides to stay in Paris to learn about the modern world. After Gabriel gives into a blackmail-themed deal with Felix to obtain most of the Miraculous, Su-Han admitted that he is still not accustomed to the modern world and leaves to go obtain reinforcements. Su-Han would later train Luka, Jagged Stone, and Penny Rolling when they leave Paris.

== Kwamis ==
The Kwamis are magical entities who embody specific concepts and resemble animals.

- Tikki (voiced by Mela Lee in the English dub and Marie Nonnenmacher in the French version) is the Kwami of Creation who resides within the Ladybug Miraculous, a pair of earrings that Marinette uses to transform into Ladybug. Tikki is a positive and serious Kwami, who believes strongly in Marinette and she gives her advice to be the best that she can be, regardless of transformation. She is more than 13 billion years old and has watched over every Ladybug since the beginning, one of her Miraculous's previous owners being Joan of Arc. (Note: {{Cite episode|title=The Pharaoh|series=Miraculous: Tales of Ladybug and Cat Noir|network=Nickelodeon|date=3 January 2016|season=1|number=6|time=20:28|quote="I'm older than [5,000 years old]. I'm the Kwami that's watched over every Ladybug since the very beginning! Tikki is a crimson creature that is 4 inches tall. She has blue eyes, and resembles a ladybug, with two antennae, large black spots on her forehead and cheeks, and a short tail with three tips aligned vertically. Tikki is calm and collected[1], while being optimistic, loving, kind, and encouraging.: @trashUlater (27 September 2015). "@Thomas_Astruc How were Tikki's and Plagg's name decided?" (Tweet) – via Twitter.; Thomas Astruc [@thomas_astruc] (27 September 2015). "@trashUlater The rule : every kwami must have a short name and a double letter in it" (Tweet) – via Twitter.; Thomas Astruc [@thomas_astruc] (27 September 2015). "@trashUlater Tikki means happiness in language I can't remember. Plagg, obviously, is based on plague in english" (Tweet) – via Twitter.)
- Plagg (voiced by Max Mittelman in the English dub and Thierry Kazazian in the French version) is the Kwami of Destruction who is bound to the Cat Miraculous, a ring. Plagg looks much like Tikki, but with a black body, green eyes, and pointed ears, resembling a black cat. Unlike Tikki, however, Plagg is sarcastic and lazy. Although he cares for Adrien, he is less invested in his problems and often gives wrong or destructive advice. His favorite food is camembert, which he is shown to have an obsession for.
- Wayzz (voiced by Christopher Corey Smith in the English dub and Franck Tordjman in the French version) is the Kwami of Protection previously owned by Wang Fu now currently by Nino, bound to the Turtle Miraculous, a bracelet.
- Nooroo (voiced by Ben Diskin in the English dub and Martial Le Minoux in the French version) is the Kwami of Transmission, bound to the Butterfly Miraculous, a locket brooch. Previously owned by Gabriel Agreste, and was used by him to become Hawk Moth/Shadow Moth/Monarch, and now owned by Lila to used to turn into Chrysalis.
- Trixx (voiced by Cherami Leigh in the English dub and Franck Tordjman in the French version) is the Kwami of Illusion, bound to the Fox Miraculous, a necklace that owned by Alya Cesaire and used to become Rena Rouge.
- Pollen (voiced by Cassandra Lee Morris in Seasons 2–3, Lauren Landa in Season 4 onward) in the English dub and Clara Soares in the French version) is the Kwami of Action (also "Subjection"), bound to the Bee Miraculous, a hair comb. Previously owned by Chloe Bourgeois when it was used to turn her into Queen Bee, and now it's owned by Zoe Lee and used to become Vesperia.
- Duusu (voiced by Melissa Fahn in the English dub and Fanny Bloc in the French version) is the Kwami of Emotion, bound to the Peacock Miraculous, a brooch. Due to the Peacock Miraculous being damaged, Duusu acts sporadically, often quickly switching between being happy and sad. When the Peacock Miraculous is repaired, Duusu's mind is healed. This miraculous was originally owned by Emilie, then transferred to Nathalie where it was used to help Gabriel, but now Felix owns it because he threatened Gabriel in exchange for the other Miraculouses that Ladybug used to take care of.
- Mullo (voiced by Deneen Melody in the English dub and Clara Soares in the French version) is the Kwami of Multiplication, bound to the Mouse Miraculous, a coin pendant.
- Stompp (voiced by Thierry Kazazian in the French version and Lauren Landa in Season 3 onward in the English dub) is the Kwami of Determination, bound to the Ox Miraculous, a nose ring. His power manifests as Resistance, which makes the user invulnerable to physical attacks and other superpowers.
- Roaar (voiced by Sandy Fox in Seasons 3–4 in the English dub and Jeanne Chartier in the French version) is the Kwami of Elation, bound to the Tiger Miraculous, a panjas bracelet.
- Fluff (voiced by Ryan Bartley in Seasons 3–4 in the English dub and Céline Melloul the French version) is the Kwami of Evolution, bound to the Rabbit Miraculous, a pocket watch. She appears to be a reference to the White Rabbit from Alice's Adventures in Wonderland, who also carries a pocket watch and obsesses over being late.
- Longg (voiced by Grant George in the English dub and Jessie Lambotte in the French version) is the Kwami of Perfection, bound to the Dragon Miraculous, a beaded choker. His power manifests as elemental shapeshifting, allowing his holder to transform into wind, water, or lightning.
- Sass (voiced by Ben Diskin in the English dub and Alexandre Nguyen in the French version) is the Kwami of Intuition, bound to the Snake Miraculous, an ouroboros bracelet. He can use his Second Chance without a holder to go back to any time of his choosing, but he will cause time anomalies from the past to end up in the present and mess up clocks and other timing systems.
- Kaalki (voiced by Deneen Melody in Seasons 3–4 in the English dub and Fanny Bloc in the French version) is the Kwami of Migration (also "Teleportation"), bound to the Horse Miraculous, a pair of sunglasses, and speaking (in the English dub) with a Mid-Atlantic accent.
- Ziggy (voiced by Susannah Corrington in the English dub and Céline Melloul in the French version) is the Kwami of Passion, bound to the Goat Miraculous, a pair of hair clips.
- Xuppu (voiced by Sarah Weisz in the English dub and Franck Tordjman in the French version) is the Kwami of Derision, bound to the Monkey Miraculous, a circlet.
- Orikko (voiced by Sabrina Weisz in the English dub and Martial Le Minoux in the French version) is the Kwami of Pretension, bound to the Rooster Miraculous, a thumb ring.
- Barkk (voiced by Sabrina Glow in Season 4 in the English dub and Jessie Lambotte in the French version) is the Kwami of Adoration, bound to the Dog Miraculous, a collar necklace.
- Daizzi (voiced by Jessica Gee-George in the English dub and Gauthier Battoue in the French version) is the Kwami of Jubilation, bound to the Pig Miraculous, a pearl anklet.
- Liiri (voiced by Cedric Williams in the English dub and Jessie Lambotte in the French version) is the Kwami of Freedom, bound to the Eagle Miraculous, a talon pendant. His power manifests as "Liberation", allowing the user to free anyone of that person's mental restraints. He once belonged to Gilbert du Motier but ended up in the hands of Gabriel Agreste after he stole the Eagle Miraculous. It later ended up with Jessica Keynes.
- Gimmi (voiced by Mela Lee and Max Mittelman in the English dub and Marie Nonnemacher and Thierry Kazazian in the French verison) is the Kwami of Reality and the fusion of Tikki and Plagg. Anyone who wants to have a wish granted by it must make a sacrifice. Gabriel opted to sacrifice his life so that Nathalie can be healed.

== Other characters ==
- Émilie Agreste (née Lady Graham de Vanily) (voiced by Colleen O'Shaughnessey in the English dub, and Jeanne Chartier in the French version) was the wife of Gabriel Agreste and the mother of Adrien, along with being Amélie Graham de Vanily's twin sister. Émilie was born into a British aristocratic and noble family who wanted their daughters to maintain their legacy. She had a wild and curious nature growing up and hated the nobility life. Her parents sent her to Paris, where she soon met and fell in love with Gabriel, eventually giving up everything to be with him. While publicly declared deceased, Émilie stayed in a comatose state and was kept in a glass coffin located in a repository in the Agreste's basement. She is also a former actress. She aided Gabriel in finding the Miraculous and received the Peacock Miraculous from him, the use of the damaged Miraculous being the direct cause of her current condition. After Gabriel decides against bringing her back to life as she wished, she joins Gabriel in the afterlife following his wish to heal Nathalie.
- Aurore Beauréal (voiced by Mela Lee in the English dub, Geneviève Doang in the French version of Climatika, Marie Nonnenmacher onwards) is a student in Ms. Mendeleiev's class and an aspiring weathergirl, often seen with her parasol. Her villain form is Stormy Weather, a parasol-wielding villain who can control the weather. In season six, Chrysalis akumatized Aurore into the Stormy Weather variant Climatiqueen who can control anyone she strikes with her thunderbolts.
- Fred Haprèle (voiced by Ezra Weisz in the English dub and Franck Tordjman in the French version) is a part-time assistant teacher at Collège Françoise Dupont, an expert mime artist, and the father of Mylène. His villain form is Mime, a silent mime who does mime-based tricks.
- Alec Cataldi (voiced by Andre Gordon in the English dub and Thierry Kazazian in the French version) is a TV host who hosts different shows. Due to childhood bullying, he is typically insensitive and unkind towards others, often contributing to them being akumatized. But he gets over this, now wishing to inspire people and dressing in drag. His villain form is Wishmaker, a wish-themed villain who can make people unwillingly turn into their childhood dreams.
- Xavier-Yves "XY" Roth (voiced by Benjamin Diskin in the English dub and by Alexandre Nguyen in the French version) is a pop music star who is the son of Bob Roth. In "Guitar Villain", XY is targeted by the titular villain. In the episode "Kwamibuster", he appears as an expert on Alternative Truth.
- Vincent Aza (voiced by Matthew Mercer in the English dub and Franck Tordjman in the French version) is a skilled photographer. He is an obsessive fan of Jagged Stone, following him everywhere he goes and holding a personal shrine for him in his room. His villain form is Pixelator, a photographer-themed villain who can trap the people he takes pictures of in photographs. Vincent later became a social media influencer. Chrysalis akumatized Vincent into an upgraded version of Pixelator called Revelator with secret-extracting abilities.
- Théo Barbot (voiced by Brian Beacock in the English dub and Franck Tordjman in the French version) is an artist and sculptor that lives in Paris. He is responsible for constructing the Ladybug and Cat Noir sculpture in the Place des Voyages and has a crush on Ladybug, although he later gets over this. He has also made several cameo appearances with random jobs. His villain form is Copycat, an exact copy of Cat Noir. In season six, Barbot is akumatized into the giant regenerating clay statue-themed villain named Mr. Agreste when Adrian rejected his plans to have a statue of Gabriel made.
- Simon Grimault (voiced by Ezra Weisz in the English dub and Franck Tordjman in the French version) is a hypnotist who uses cards. His villain form is Simon Says, a hypnotist-themed villain who can hypnotize people using his cards.
- Alim Kubdel (voiced by Todd Haberkorn in the English dub and by Philippe Roullier in French version) is the father of Alix and Jalil and the manager of Louvre. In Timebreaker, he gave Alix a pocket watch which is later revealed to be the Rabbit Miraculous in camouflage mode. In season 5, it is revealed that he knew all along that his daughter would eventually become a superhero and that he has been preparing her for the day Ladybug would seek her help.
- Jalil Kubdel (voiced by Vic Mignogna in season one of the English dub, Alejandro Saab in season five of the English dub, and by Franck Tordjman in the French version) is Alix's older brother. He is a young historian and presumably works at the Louvre alongside his father Alim. His villain form is Pharaoh, an Egyptian mask-wearing pharaoh-themed villain who has powers related to Egyptian gods: creating time-slowing bubbles (Thoth), superhuman strength (Sekhmet), turning people into obedient mummies (Anubis), and flight (Horus). In the fifth season, Jalil is akumatized into Pharaoh again and wields Maat's Book of Truth. In season six, Jalil attends Collège Françoise Dupont.
- Otis Césaire (voiced by Paul St. Peter in the English dub and by Éric Peter in the French version) is a zookeeper at the Ménagerie du Jardin des Plantes and the father of Alya. His villain form is Animan, a villain who can transform into any animal.
- Marlena Césaire (voiced by Erin Fitzgerald in the English dub and by Marie Chevalot in the French version) is the Chef de cuisine of Le Grand Paris' restaurant and the mother of Alya.
- Mr. Banana (voiced by Bryce Papenbrook in the English dub of "Kwamibuster" and "Party Crasher", Ezra Weisz in the English dub of Season 4) is a mascot in Paris who resembles a banana with yellow and green skin-tight leggings and yellow crocks. The person who wears the costume is unknown and his catchphrase is "Stay peachy". In season six, Mr. Banana is hired at TVi after it is bought out by Noé Luxus.
- Wang Cheng (voiced by Todd Haberkorn in the English dub and by Bing Yin in the French version) is Marinette's maternal great-uncle and Sabine's childhood guardian. He is a world-renowned chef, owns a popular restaurant in Shanghai, and is known for improvising a new ingredient with every dish. Wang was once akumatized into the chef-themed villain Kung Food who uses food-based weapons. In Miraculous Shanghai, Marinette visits Wang. By the end of the film, Wang takes in Fei Wu.
- August (voiced by Grant George in the English dub and Caroline Combes in the French version) is a baby boy who just wants a lollipop, but is not allowed to by his mother because he is too young. His villain form is Gigantitan, a giant version of himself.
- Clara Nightingale (voiced by Allegra Clark in the English dub, singing voice provided by Laura Marano in the English dub and Clara Soares in the French version) is a pop music singer. Her villain form is Frightingale, a pop music star-themed villain with a whip/microphone hybrid that curses anyone she strikes with it and turns them into pink statues if they refuse to sing, dance, or speak in rhymes for too long.
- Vivica (voiced by Morgan Berry in the English dub and Fanny Bloc in the French version) is a professional guitarist working for Jagged Stone. She was based on a real person named Vivica, who won a contest at the Miraculous panel at L.A. Comic Con 2016. She was supposed to be a veterinarian, but it was changed. Her villain form is Desperada, a Calaca-themed villain who can create instrument-themed weapons that she claims never miss their target.
- Marianne Lenoir (voiced by Barbara Goodson in the English dub and Jeanne Chartier in the French version) is an old companion and lover of Master Fu, whom he parted ways with during World War II. She is eventually able to reunite with him, although they decide to remain apart after Hawk Moth learns of their association. After Fu renounces guardianship of the Miracle Box to Ladybug and loses his memories, Marianne returns and takes him away from Paris. In season four, Marianne is later revealed to have married Fu and later helps Ladybug and Cat Noir into de-akumatizing Fu. Her villain form is the clock-themed Backwarder who can make people perform their actions in reverse.
- Wayhem (voiced by Chris Hackney in the English dub and by Franck Tordjman in the French version) is a teenager living in Paris. He is an obsessive fan of Adrien, although eventually he tones his behavior down and becomes more friendly to him. His villain form is Party Crasher, a disco-themed villain who can trap anyone in his disco balls and predict his opponents' movements.
- "Santa Claus" (voiced by Joe Ochman in the English dub and Martial Le Minoux in the French version) is the immortal mascot of Christmas. Once when Ladybug mistook him for a villain, Hawk Moth akumatized Santa Claus into Santa Claws, who is able to conjure explosive presents, activate presents that have weapons that he can use, and uses a motorcycle-handled sleigh pulled by akumatized reindeer can become intangible.
- Thomas Astruc (voiced by Jason Marnocha in the English dub and Thomas Astruc in the French version) is a film director responsible for directing the in-universe animated film Les aventures de Ladybug & Chat Noir. He is based on series creator Thomas Astruc. His villain form is Animaestro, an animation-themed villain who can transform into any animated character.
- Chris Lahiffe (voiced by Alejandro Saab in the English dub and Clara Soares in the French version) is the younger brother of Nino. His villain form is Christmaster, a Christmas-themed villain who can control giant living toys with help from his snowglobe. A future version of him was akumatized by the future Butterfly Miraculous holder into the time-traveling tagger-themed villain Timetagger and is sent to the present to obtain the heroes' Miraculouses before they become adults.
- Claudie Kanté (voiced by Danielle Judovits in the English dub and Céline Melloul in the French version) is Max's mother. She is the conductor of the Startrain, although has ambitions to become an astronaut, which she eventually succeeds in. Her villain form is Startrain, the conductor of a space-faring train who can manipulate all of its systems. She is the first and so far the only villain to act entirely to her own accord as Hawk Moth lost track of the akuma.
- The United Heroez are a group of superheroes operating in the United States of America.
  - Olympia Hill / Majestia (voiced by Anairis Quiñones in the English dub and Nathalie Bienaimé in the French version) is the leader of the United Heroez. She is one of the most powerful heroes in the United States. Majestia is the creator and mother of Uncanny Valley, and is engaged in a relationship with Knightowl. She has a sister named Ignoblia who will be a future enemy of Ladybug and Cat Noir. She is described by Thomas Astruc as a "fusion between Superman and Wonder Woman", and her design resembles the likes of Power Girl, Supergirl, and Carol Danvers.
  - Barbara Keynes / Knightowl (voiced by Anairis Quiñones when unmasked in the English dub, Imari Williams when masked in the English dub and Pauline Moingeon when unmasked in the French version, Mario Bastelica when masked in the French version) is an owl-themed superhero and a member of the United Heroez who Mr. Damocles is a fan of. She is very strict and follows a tight code of ethics, growing frustrated with anyone who breaks her rules or does not appear to take superheroics seriously. Even so, she is able to respect those that prove themselves, allowing Sparrow to have more independence when she becomes Eagle. She is engaged in a relationship with Olympia Hill/Majestia. As revealed towards the end of the special, Barbara is actually the latest incarnation of Knightowl as the mantle has been passed down for generations and as such disguises her gender while in-costume. During the fight against the Miraculized, Knightowl is shown sporting a different costume.
  - Jessica Keynes / Sparrow / Eagle (voiced by Jaimi Gray as Jessica in the English dub, Scott Whyte when masked in the English dub and Céline Melloul as Jessica in the French version, Alan Aubert-Carlin when masked in the French version) is the daughter of Knightowl. She is Knightowl's sidekick, although desires to be treated as a proper heroine. After receiving the Eagle Miraculous, she transforms into the superhero Eagle. Sparrow is presumably based on Robin.
  - Aeon Hill / Uncanny Valley (voiced by Kimberly Woods in the English dub and Fily Keita in the French version of Miraculous World New York, Laure Filiu in season 5, and Jaynélia Coadou in Miraculous World Tokyo) is an android superhero that appears in Miraculous New York. She is the creation of Majestia and the best friend of Jessica Keynes who is able to fly, fire lasers, and hack into technology.
  - Camilla Hombee / Victory (voiced by Laura Stahl in the English dub and Pauline Moingeon Vallés in the French version) is the President of the United States and a patriotic superhero who is also a member of the United Heroez. She wields a shield and has access to numerous military weapons hidden across New York City. Victory's design and use of a shield are presumably based upon Captain America.
  - Dean Gate / Doorman (voiced by Alejandro Saab in the English dub and Jean-Yves Brignon in the French version) is a superhero who is a member of the United Heroez. He possesses the ability to turn any door into a portal that would connect any location in the world. As a civilian, Gate is a professor at Armstrong High School.
- Hot Dog Dan (voiced by Kellen Goff in the English dub and Philippe Roullier in the French version) is a hot dog-themed superhero who first appears in a minor role in Miraculous New York. His magic hot dogs can temporarily grant its consumer different superpowers. Hot Dog Dan's civilian form is a hot dog vendor.
- Mike Rochip / Techno-Pirate (voiced by Kellen Goff in the English dub and Asto Kross in the French version) is a supervillain that appears in Miraculous New York. He is obsessed with stealing technology and has superhuman strength and technopathic abilities. His akumatized form is Techlonizer who can absorb technology and use its abilities for himself. He later uses the Eagle Miraculous to become Miraclonizer who is able to fly and use the Eagle Miraculous's power of Liberation.
- The unnamed Native American monk (voiced by Grant George in the English dub and Martial Le Minoux) is a member of the Order of the Guardians that appeared in Miraculous New York as the guardian of the Native American Miraculous Box. He briefly appears at the end of the special to confront Eagle and Uncanny Valley and reclaim the Eagle Miraculous, but is instead convinced to stay in New York and create a new generation of heroes.
- Fei Wu / Lady Dragon (voiced by Xanthe Huynh in the English dub and Geneviève Doang in the French version) is a young martial artist who appears in Miraculous Shanghai. She is the adoptive daughter of Wu Shifu, learning kung fu and values under him to become the Guardian of the Sacred Cave. After Shifu is killed and the bracelet that he entrusted Fei with is stolen, Fei becomes a thief to pay Cash for information on her father's killer. After meeting Marinette, she renounces this lifestyle. After claiming the Prodigious jewel Shifu was protecting, she transforms into Ladydragon, gaining the ability to see creatures called Renlings, and transform into different animals if she possesses the values they represent. After defeating Cash, Fei moves in with Wang Cheng. Lady Dragon later appeared in the season five finale of the main series where she is among the superheroes that help fight the Miraculized.
- The Renlings are sprite-like beings that appear in Miraculous Shanghai. They are "cousins" to the Kwamis and represent human values. They grant whoever wields the Prodigious the ability to transform into the animals they resemble as long as they possess the values they represent.
  - Long Long (voiced by Christopher Corey Smith in the English dub) is a dragon-like Renling who represents Justice.
  - Xiong Xiong (voiced by Sabrina Weisz in the English dub) is a bear-like Renling who represents Calmness.
  - Tang Tang (voiced by Mela Lee in the English dub) is a mantis-like Renling who represents Patience.
  - She She (voiced by Carrie Keranen in the English dub) is a snake-like Renling who represents Courage.
  - Ying Ying (voiced by Christine Marie Cabanos in the English dub) is an eagle-like Renling who represents Confidence.
  - Hou Hou (voiced by Brook Chalmers in the English dub) is a monkey-like Renling who represents Compassion.
  - Ma Ma (voiced by Xander Mobus in the English dub) is a horse-like Renling who represents Honor.
  - Hu Hu (voiced by Jeannie Tirado in the English dub) is a tiger-like Renling who represents Discipline.
- Cash (voiced by Caleb Yen in the English dub) is a greedy crime boss and pawnbroker in Shanghai. He briefly appears in Miraculous New York and officially debuts in Miraculous Shanghai. Prior to the events of the special, he was responsible for the death of Wu Shifu, the destruction of his school, and stealing Fei's bracelet which he subsequently sold to Nathalie on behalf of Gabriel. Cash later has Fei steal for him in return for information about her father's killer. However, Fei eventually leaves him when he tries to make Marinette buy back her own things at his shop. As Ladydragon, she decides to bring Cash to justice. His akumatized form is King Cash, a tall golden terracotta man whose fan has silver blades that can cut through anything and golden blades that can turn whatever it touches to gold.
- Mei Shi (voiced by Mark Chen in the English dub) is the lion-like protector of the Prodigious who appears in Miraculous Shanghai. Initially, he appears as a humanoid Chinese guardian lion-like statue, judging whoever claims the Prodigious of their worthiness. Later, he transforms into a small kwami-like creature and begins accompanying Ladydragon. Mei Shi's akumatized form is Yan Luo Shi, a red Titan-sized version of himself who has the ability to destroy anything with his optic lasers.
- Harry Clown (voiced by Benjamin Diskin in the English dub and Franck Dubosc in the French version) is a comedian who is known for wearing a clown nose and has been wanting to do a non-comedic movie much to the objection of Bob Roth. His design is based on French comedian Franck Dubosc. Harry's villain form is Psycomedian, a jester-themed villain who can force people to feel particular emotions.
- Rhythm is a young girl who spends time with her pet black cat. When she loses her cat, Monarch Amokized her piggy bank into the Sentimonster Kuro Neko. When Kuro Neko was defeated, Rhythm was reunited with her cat by "Cat Walker".
- Didier Roustan (voiced by Christopher Corey Smith in the English and by Didier Roustan in French version) is a sports coach/journalist who teaches Miss Bustier's class to play football in "Penalteam". He is based on the real-life French sports journalist Didier Roustan.
- Froggy (voiced by Mela Lee in the English dub and Céline Melloul) is a young boy who likes frogs and rides a tricycle. His villain form is Risk, a frog-themed villain who can make people more reckless.
- Véronique (voiced by Laura Post in the English dub and Véronique Berecz in French dub) is the curator of the Musée Grévin. When Mayor Bourgeois objects to having a section for the temporary heroes opened and threatens to close the museum, Véronique is akumatized by Monarch into Manipula, a wax-themed villain who can control wax sculptures. She is based on real-life Musée Grévin manager Véronique Berecz.
- Kouki (voiced by Mark Whitten in the English dub) is a kickboxer. His villain form is the gigantic dark purple bear-themed Kiku that can shoot out his fists.
- A.D.A. (voiced by Haviland Stillwell in the English dub) is an acronym for the Affective Decision Assistance. As an artificial intelligence created by Tsurugi Industries, Monarch manipulated it into thinking that Claudie Kanté was lost in space. When Cosmobug exposed the lie, Monarch akumatized A.D.A. into the jet-like Bugfighter.
- Gisele (voiced by Kimberly Woods in the English dub) is Ms. Bustier's partner.
- Harmonie (voiced by Tara Platt in the English dub) is Ms. Bustier's daughter.
- Bertrand King (voiced by Keith Silverstein in the English dub and Martial Le Minoux in the French version) is the owner of a plastic-manufacturing company. His villain form is King of Plastic who can turn people into plastic.
- The Re-Verse inhabitants come from an alternate reality called the Re-Verse. They were introduced in Miraculous World: Paris - Tales of Shadybug and Claw Noir.
  - Marinette Dupain-Cheng / Shadybug / Ladybug (voiced by Cristina Valenzuela in the English dub and Anouck Hautbois in the French version) is a version of Marinette Dupain-Cheng from the "Re-Verse" who appears in Miraculous World: Paris - Tales of Shadybug and Claw Noir. She and Claw Noir follow Betterfly to Ladybug and Cat Noir's reality in order to target his Butterfly Miraculous in the name of the Supreme. After being defeated by Ladybug, Marinette renounced her evil ways and used her Miraculous Ladybug abilities to undo the damages they caused before siding with Betterfly against the Supreme.
  - Adrien Agreste / Claw Noir / Paw Noir (voiced by Bryce Papenbrook in the English dub and Benjamin Bollen in the French version) is a version of Adrien Agreste from the "Re-Verse" who appears in Miraculous World: Paris - Tales of Shadybug and Claw Noir. He and Shadybug follow Betterfly to Ladybug and Cat Noir's reality in order to target his Butterfly Miraculous in the name of the Supreme. After being defeated by Cat Noir, Adrien renounces evil, assumes the alias "Paw Noir" and sides with Betterfly against the Supreme.
  - Gabriel Agreste / Betterfly (voiced by Keith Silverstein in the English dub and Antoine Tomé in the French version) is a version of Gabriel Agreste from the "Re-Verse" who appears in Miraculous World: Paris - Tales of Shadybug and Claw Noir. He is a superhero and member of the Resistance who fights a villain called the Supreme.
  - Alya Césaire (voiced by Carrie Keranen in the English dub and Fanny Bloc in the French version) is a version of Alya Césaire from the "Re-Verse" who appears in Miraculous World: Paris - Tales of Shadybug and Claw Noir. She is a member of the Resistance and works for Betterfly. This alternate Alya was kamikotized into Ubiquity by Betterfly to allow him to escape to Ladybug and Cat Noir's reality.
  - Nino Lahiffe (voiced by Zeno Robinson in the English dub and Alexandre Nguyen in the French version) is a version of Nino Lahiffe from the "Re-Verse" who appears in Miraculous World: Paris - Tales of Shadybug and Claw Noir. He is a member of the Resistance and works for Betterfly.
  - Maxkov (voiced by Zeno Robinson in the English dub and Martial Le Minoux in the French version) is a robot version of Max from the "Re-Verse" who appears in Miraculous World: Paris - Tales of Shadybug and Claw Noir. He is a member of the Resistance and works for Betterfly.
- The Supreme (voiced by Keith Silverstein in the English dub and Martial Le Minoux in the French version of Miraculous World Paris and Laurent Banplain in the French version of Miraculous World Tokyo) is an unseen being who gave the Re-Verse's Marinette and Adrien their Miraculous and placed a spell on Tikki and Plagg to prevent them from fusing into Gimmi.
- Raymond (voiced by Christopher Corey Smith in the English dub) is a character that appears in the film Ladybug & Cat Noir: The Movie. He works at the fair and gets akumatized into the gargoyle-themed Gargoyle after his lover refused his proposal.
- The Magician (voice by Shelby Young in the English dub) is a character that appears in the film, Ladybug & Cat Noir: The Movie. When she is akumatized into the magician-themed villain, she gains the ability to warp reality through the use of her wand.
  - The unnamed Mime (voice by Jon Allen in the English dub) is a character that appears in the film Ladybug & Cat Noir: The Movie. He was akumatized alongside the Magician to the mime-themed villain to help take Ladybug and Cat Noir's Miraculous. His powers are similar to that of Fred Haprèle as the Mime.
- Stellar Force is a group of Japanese heroes in Miraculous World: Tokyo that are guard the Stellar Matrix fragments and protect the people of Japan. Each of them is a student at Kano Academy has an alias from the Zodiac.
  - Kazuno / Capricorn (voiced by Zach Aguilar in the English dub and Grégory Laisné in the French version) is a member of the Stellar Force and wielder of the Capricorn fragment. He lives alone and is an expert at judo.
  - Pili / Aries (voiced by Nick Martineau in the English dub) is a member of Stellar Force and wielder of the Aries fragment. He uses lasers in battle.
  - Miki / Leo (voiced by Rebecca Wang in the English dub and Claire Baradat in the French version) is a member of Stellar Force and wielder of the Leo fragment. She is an expert kickboxer.
  - Mayotte / Sagittarius (voiced by Secunda Wood in the English dub) is a member of the Stellar Force and wielder of the Sagittarius fragment.
  - Yu Lu / Cancer (voiced by Lauren Choo in the English dub) is a member of the Stellar Force and wielder of the Cancer fragment.
  - Nikko / Gemini (voiced by Haven Schneider in the English dub) is a member of the Stellar Force and wielder of the Gemini fragment.
  - Ryu / Aquarius (voiced by Darius Johnson in the English dub) is a member of the Stellar Force and wielder of the Aquarius fragment.
  - Jéola / Virgo (voiced by Jennifer Sun Bell in the English dub) is a member of the Stellar Force and wielder of the Virgo fragment.
  - Bulgan / Taurus (voiced by Khoi Dao in the English dub) is a tall chubby member of the Stellar Force and wielder of the Taurus fragment.
  - Karelia / Pisces (voiced by Amber Aviles in the English dub) is a member of the Stellar Force and wielder of the Pisces fragment.
  - Keith / Libra (voiced by Ryan Colt Levy) is a member of the Stellar Force and wielder of the Libra fragment.
  - Anglia / Scorpio (voiced by Kate Clarke) is a member of the Stellar Force and wielder of the Scorpio fragment.
- Moddler (voiced by Xander Mobus in the English dub) is the main antagonist of Miraculous World: Tokyo. He is an alien who plans to obtain the Stellar Matrix fragments.
  - Mapper (voiced by Sabrina Weisz in the English dub) is a plant-like alien minion of Moddler.
  - Rigger is a rock alien minion of Moddler.
  - Skinner is a chimeric alien minion of Moddler.
- The Kaiju are giant monsters in Miraculous World: Tokyo that attack Tokyo and often fight the Stellar Force.
- Maya (voiced by Faye Mata in the English dub and Cécile Gatto in the French version) is a young girl who is an expert artist. Cerise akumatized her into the artist-themed Illustrhater who can make her drawings real. She is the younger sister of Sam. Maya is named after Autodesk Maya, the engine used to animate the first five seasons.
- Sublime Bartlett (voiced by Analesa Fisher in the English dub and Laure Filiu in the French version) is a young para-athlete with prosthetic legs who Adrien befriends when she enrolls at Collège Françoise Dupont.
- Caroline (voiced by Cherami Leigh in the English dub) is the mother of Sublime who constantly tries to make Sublime the best she is. Cerise once akumatized her into the athletic supervillain Sublimation who can turn people into improved versions of themselves.
- Séverin Bartlett (voiced by Christopher Corey Smith in the English dub) is the father of Sublime and the ex-husband of Caroline.
- Raymond "Ray" Pugnant (voiced by Ezra Weisz in the English dub) is an old classmate of Zoé from New York. Ray and his followers try to ruin the relationship of Kim and Ondine. In the episode "Heartfixer", Ray and his followers Loïc and Nelson are akumatized into the shapeshifting Couplewreckers.
- Loïc Stompet (voiced by Benjamin Diskin in the English dub) is a cocky boy with gray and black hair who is one of Ray's lackeys. He is considered the least important of the trio as he is the one who does the dirty work of his other two friends.
- Nelson de Glusset (voiced by Andrew Russell in the English dub) is a brown-haired boy who is one of Ray's lackeys. He is considered the second in command as he is responsible for coming up with the group's plans.
- Lady Milly Graham de Vanily (voiced by Stephanie Southerland in the English dub) is the aristocratic mother of Émilie and Amélie and the grandmother of Adrien and Félix. Due to her bad relationship with her parents, Émilie never allowed Adrien to meet his grandparents. Cerise once akumatized her into the referee/ringmaster-like villain called Ringmaster who can turn people into boxing werewolves.
- Lord Emil Graham de Vanily (voiced by Benjamin Diskin in the English dub) is the aristocratic husband of Milly, the father of Émilie and Amélie, and the grandfather of Adrien and Félix. Due to her bad relationship with her parents, Émilie never allowed Adrien to meet his grandparents. When Milly was akumatized into Ringmaster, Emil was turned into a boxing werewolf called a Werepapa.
- Gabrielle Grassette (voiced by Deneen Melody in the English dub) is the mother of Gabriel and the grandmother of Adrien.
- Johnny Grassette (voiced by Paul St. Peter in the English dub) is the lover of Gabrielle, the father of Gabriel, and the grandfather of Adrien. When Milly was akumatized into "Ringmaster", Johnny was turned into a boxing werewolf called a Werepapa.
- Diane (voiced by Mela Lee in the English dub) is a West African student at Collège Françoise Dupont.
- Raúl Bruel (voiced by Keith Silverstein in the English dub) is the father of Ivan who operated as the criminal "El Toro". When Raúl was arrested, Ivan was raised by his grandmother. After Ivan refused to assist in a heist after he was released from prison and infiltrated the Louvre as a security guard, Raúl gets akumatized into the stone bull-themed El Toro de Piedra (Spanish for "The Stone Bull") whose whip can turn people into stone bulls. After being de-akumatized, Raúl changes his ways and joins Mayor Caline Bustier's "New Chances" program.
- Prem (voiced by Krishna Alexander in the English dub) is an Indian student at Collège François Dupont. Feeling horrible from causing a misunderstanding between Rose and Juleka by inviting Rose to see a vampire horror movie without Juleka being able to come along, Prem gets akumatized into the musical vampire-themed supervillain Count Vampigami in "Vampigami" who can turn others into vampires with origami bats.
- Shirel Kurtzberg (voiced by Dorah Fine in the English dub) is the mother of Nathaniel who works as an architect. Displeased with Nathaniel's life choice on doing illustration, Shirel gets akumatized into the Knights Templar-themed Ruler who uses a scale ruler to force anyone she brands into doing what she says. After being de-akumatized, Shirel sees the error of her ways.
- Aton Kurtzberg (voiced by Steve Staley in the English dub) is an artist and Nathaniel's father.
- Irupé (voiced by Kimberly Woods) is a Brazilian girl who befriends Luka. In "Mister Agreste", she acts as his fake girlfriend so that Luka does not worry Marinette with his lingering feelings towards her. She is holder of Maino'li, a totem.
  - Maino'li is a hummingbird-like totem and the companion of Irupé.
- Dr. Psiquat (voiced by Jessica Gee-George in the English dub) is a psychotherapist who helped out Max, Mylène, Juleka, and Alya with their problems. She tries to help Aglaé with her fear of insects. After this failed, Psiquat is akumatized into the psychotherapist/race car driver-themed villain Wreckless Driver, who eliminates fear from others. One day while trying to help Aglaé, she was forced to akumatized into Replay Value, with the power to go through someone's past memories. Soon, Aglaé would reveal she is Chrysalis and they would look over past events to help Chrysalis find out what she missed.
- Mr. Pugnant is a pedantic and arrogant high society member who is the father of Ray. He sees his sons actions to the other students at school and authority figures like Officer Raincomprix as proof of great leadership.
- Sam is a young boy and the older brother of Maya who likes to make babies cry, as he hates babies from his baby sister getting all of the attention at home which led to him getting humiliated by Fury. Cerise akumatized him into the baby-armored mech pilot-themed Grendiaper, who controls a giant baby-themed robot that can emit supersonic screams and shoot laser eyes. After being restored to normal, Cat Noir reprimanded Sam for his actions and advises him to make amends.
- Sophia is the baby sister of Sam.
- Twig is a cafeteria worker at Collège Françoise Dupont who Nora befriended.
- Nordine Laiffe (voiced by Christopher Corey Smith in the English dub) and Vita Lahiffe are Nino's parents. Following an argument, they are akumatized into the statuesque Titan-like villains called the Chained Titans, who are chained together and made of marble.
- Yvan Durêve is a salesman and one of Cerise's fathers. After he was fired by his boss for failing to rope in Tom Dupain, Yvan was akumatized into the businessperson-themed Manageman who can turn anyone into a project manager.
