= Bracelet =

Jewellery worn around the wrist

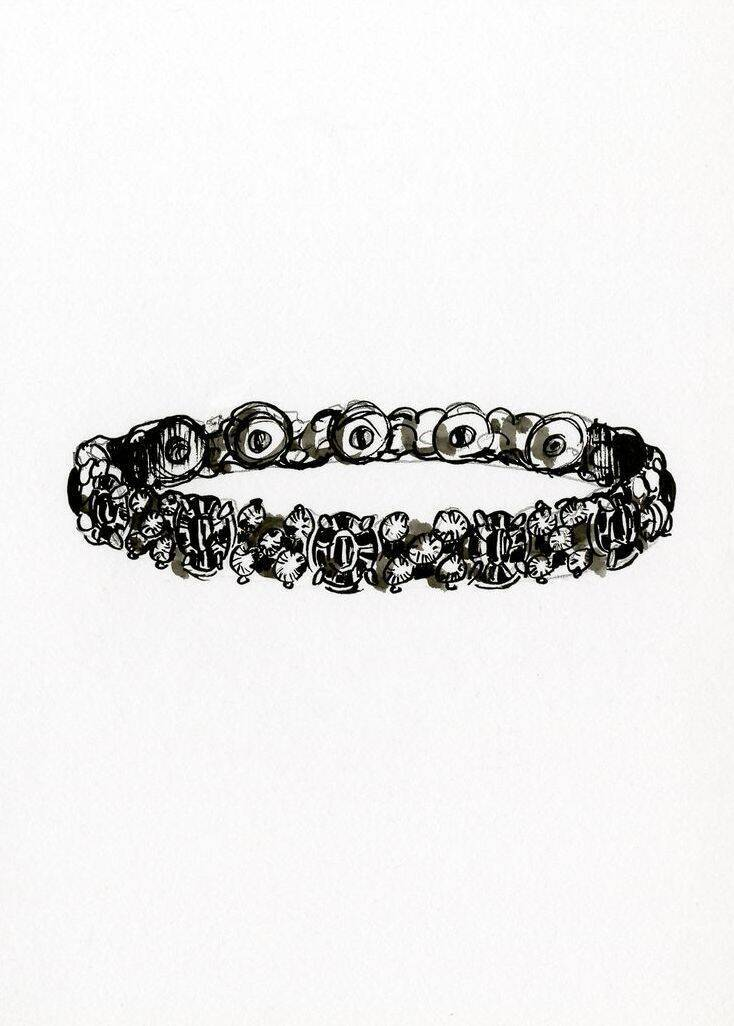
- Location: Arm
- Jewelry: Bangles; Cuffs; Tennis; Chain; Charm; Beaded; Pearl; Leather; Slider

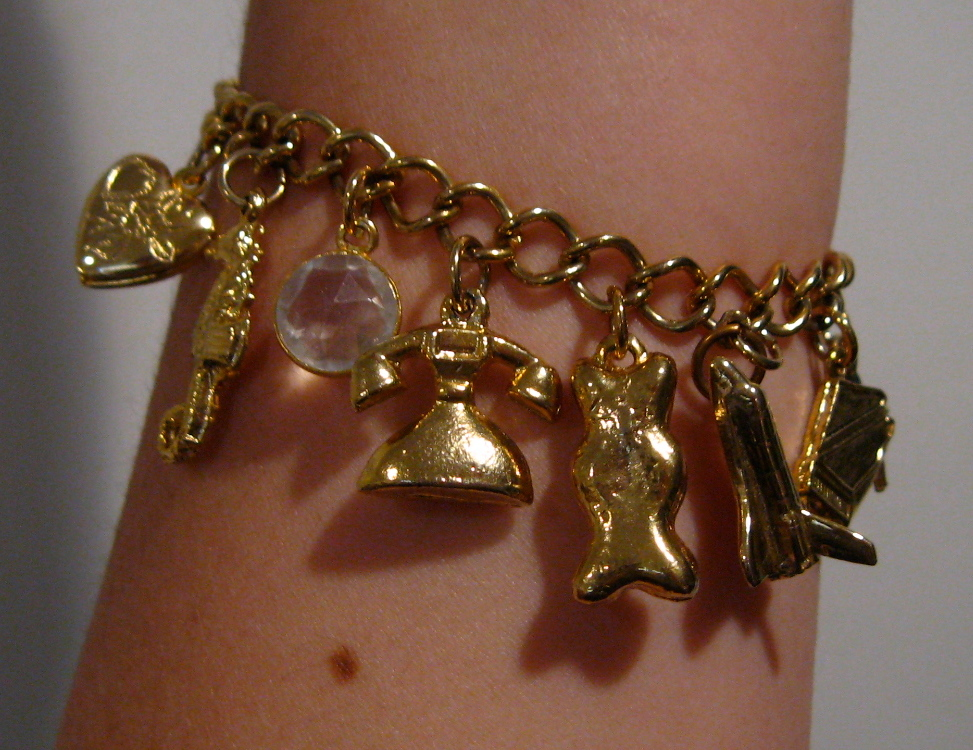
A decorative gold charm bracelet showing a heart-shaped locket, seahorse, crystal, telephone, bear, spaceship, and grand piano.

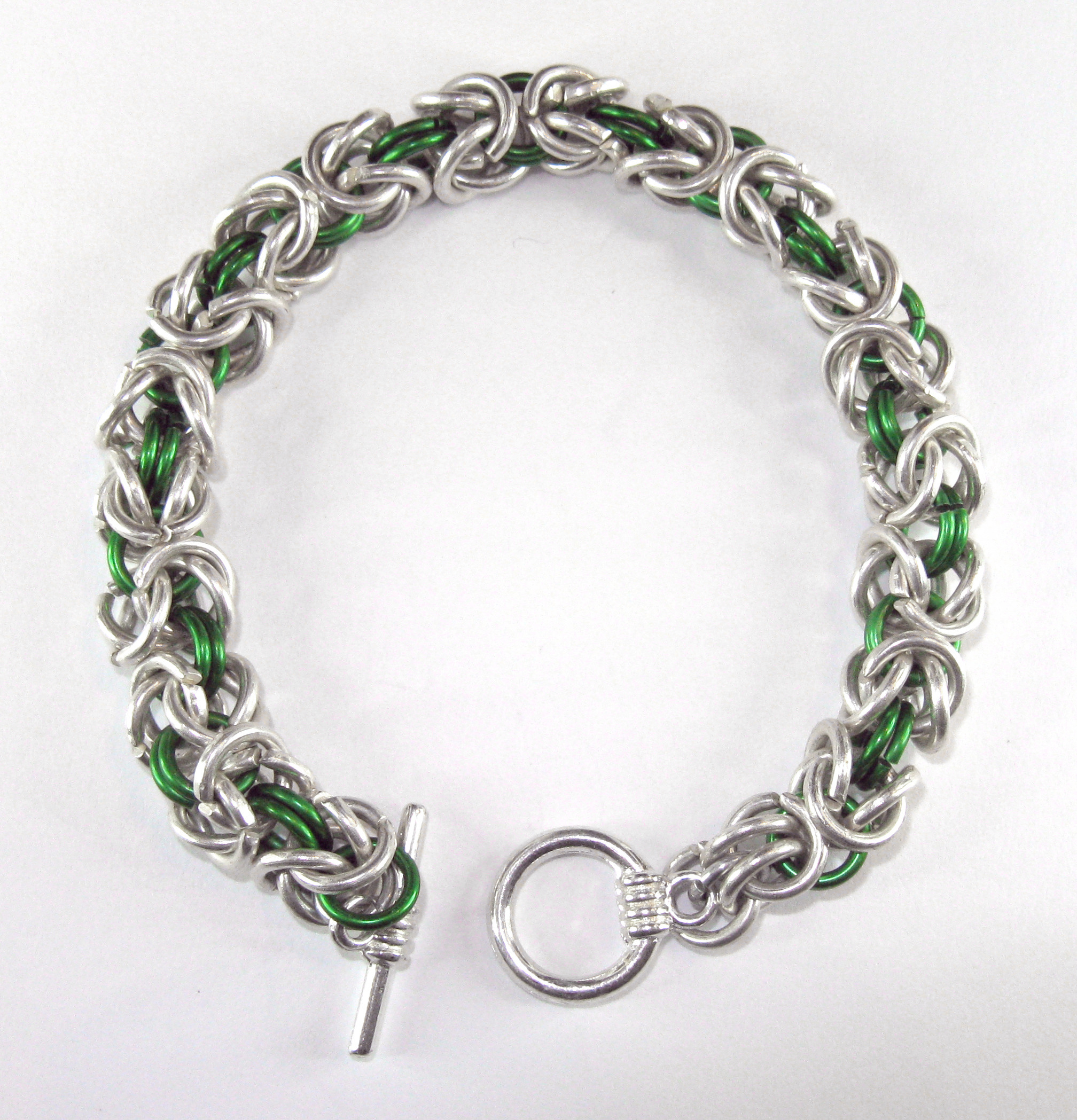
Chain mail bracelet, in Byzantine weave, with silver-plated copper rings and green aluminium rings

A bracelet is an article of jewellery that is worn around the wrist. Bracelets may serve different uses, such as being worn as an ornament. When worn as ornaments, bracelets may have a supportive function to hold other items of decoration, such as charms. Medical and identity information can be marked on some bracelets, such as allergy bracelets, hospital patient-identification tags, and bracelet tags for newborn babies. Bracelets may be worn to signify a certain phenomenon, such as breast cancer awareness, for religious/cultural purposes or as a sign of LGBTQ pride.

If a bracelet is a single, inflexible loop, it is often called a bangle. When it is worn around the ankle it is called an ankle bracelet or anklet. A boot bracelet is used to decorate boots. Bracelets can be manufactured from metal, leather, cloth, plastic, bead or other materials, and jewellery bracelets sometimes contain jewels, rocks, wood, shells, crystals, metal, or plastic hoops, pearls and many more materials.

== Origin and etymology ==
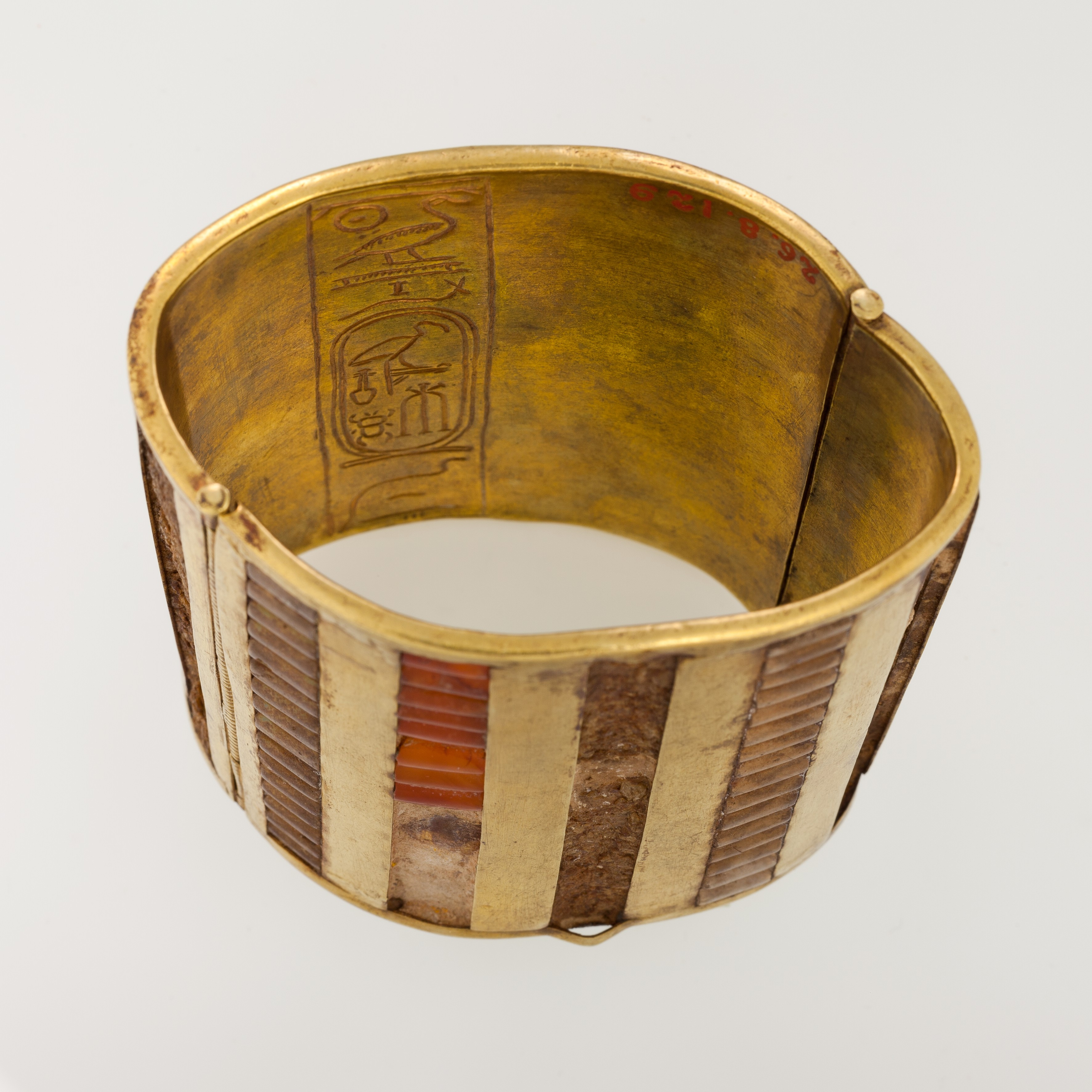
Ancient Egyptian hinged cuff bracelet, c. 1479 –1425 BCE

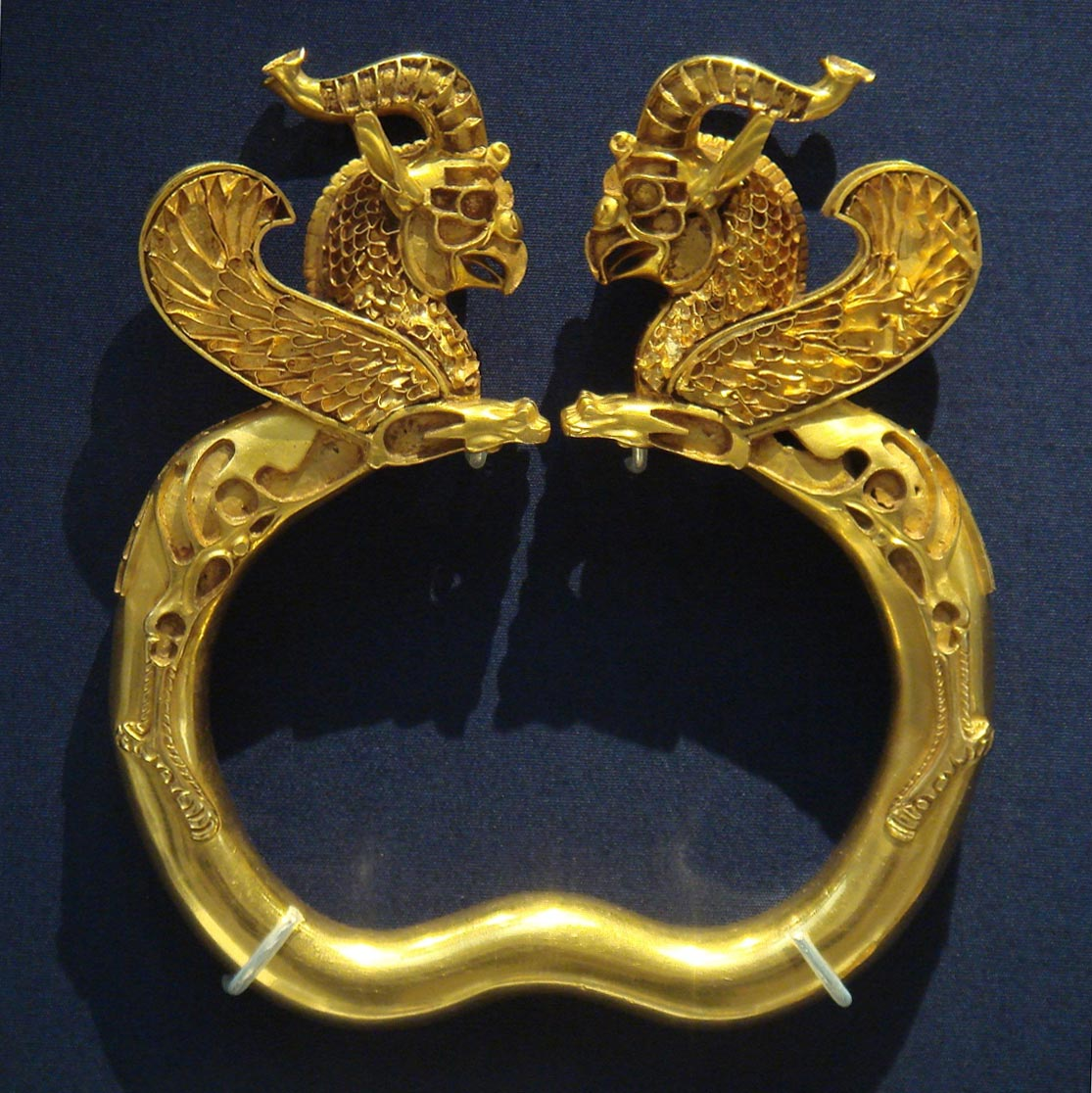
Penannular bracelet, Oxus Treasure, Achaemenid period, c. 500 BCE

Although the term armlet may be technically similar, it is taken to mean an item that sits on the upper arm: an arm ring. The origin of the term 'bracelet' is from the Greek brachile meaning 'of the arm', via the Old French bracel. A bracelet is also a small brace or bracer (an arm-guard used by archers).

== Cultural and religious significance ==
The history of Egyptian bracelets is as old as 5000 BCE. Starting with materials like bones, stones and woods to serve religious and spiritual interests. From the National Geographic Society, the Scarab Bracelet is one of the most recognized symbols of ancient Egypt. The scarab represented rebirth and regeneration. Carved scarabs were worn as jewelry and wrapped into the linen bandages of mummies. Myth told of the scarab god, Khepri, pushing the sun across the sky.

In 2008, Russian archaeologists from the Institute of Archaeology and Ethnology of Novosibirsk, working at the site of Denisova Cave in the Altai Mountains of Siberia, uncovered a small bone fragment from the fifth finger of a juvenile hominin, dubbed the "X woman" (referring to the maternal descent of mitochondrial DNA), or the Denisova hominin. Artifacts, including a bracelet, excavated in the cave at the same level were carbon dated to around 40,000 BP.

In Bulgaria, there is a tradition called martenitsa, which sometimes involves tying a red and white string around the wrist to please Baba Marta in order for spring to come sooner.

In Greece, a similar tradition, weaving a bracelet from a red and white string on the first day of March and wearing it till the end of summer, is called "Martis" and is considered to help protect the wearer's skin from the strong Greek sun.

In some parts of India, the number and type of bangles worn by a woman denotes her marital status.

In Sikhism, an iron bracelet is one of the most mandatory articles known as the Five Ks.

In Latin America, Azabache Bracelets are worn to protect against the Mal de ojo, or evil eye. The evil eye is believed to result of excessive admiration or envious looks by others. Having newborn babies wear an azabache (a gold bracelet or necklace with a black or red coral charm in the form of a fist), is believed to protect them from the evil eye.

== Types ==
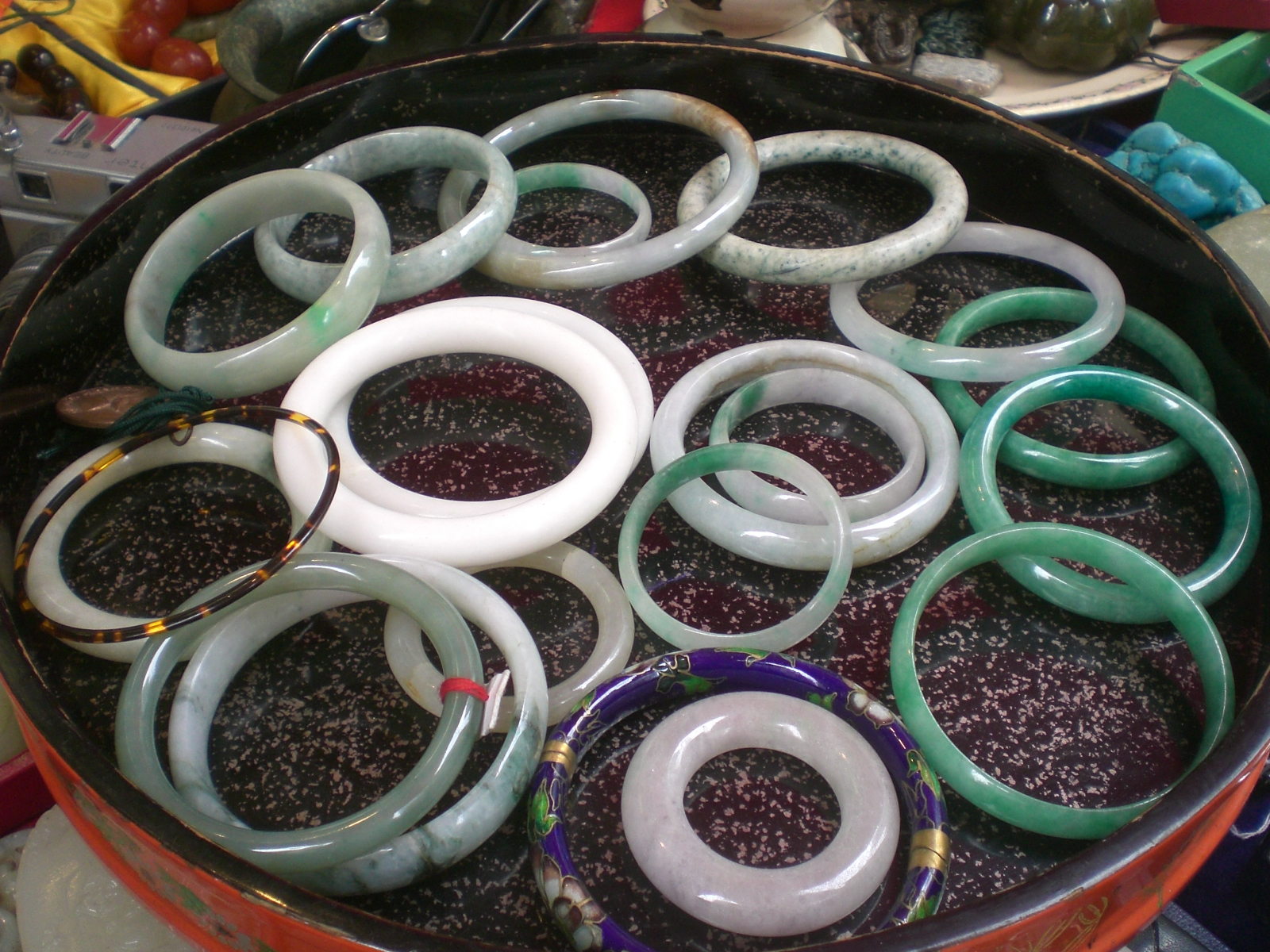
Jade bracelets

=== Alternative health ===
Alternative health bracelets, such as ionized bracelets, karma bracelets, magnetic bracelets, Power Balance hologram bracelets, etc., are not distinguished by their design but rather the beneficial function claimed for them by their manufacturers and distributors. Karma bracelets are made from wood beads and may contain various charms, and are associated with bringing good luck and good karma to those who choose to wear it. No claims of effectiveness made by manufacturers have ever been substantiated by independent sources.

=== Bangles ===
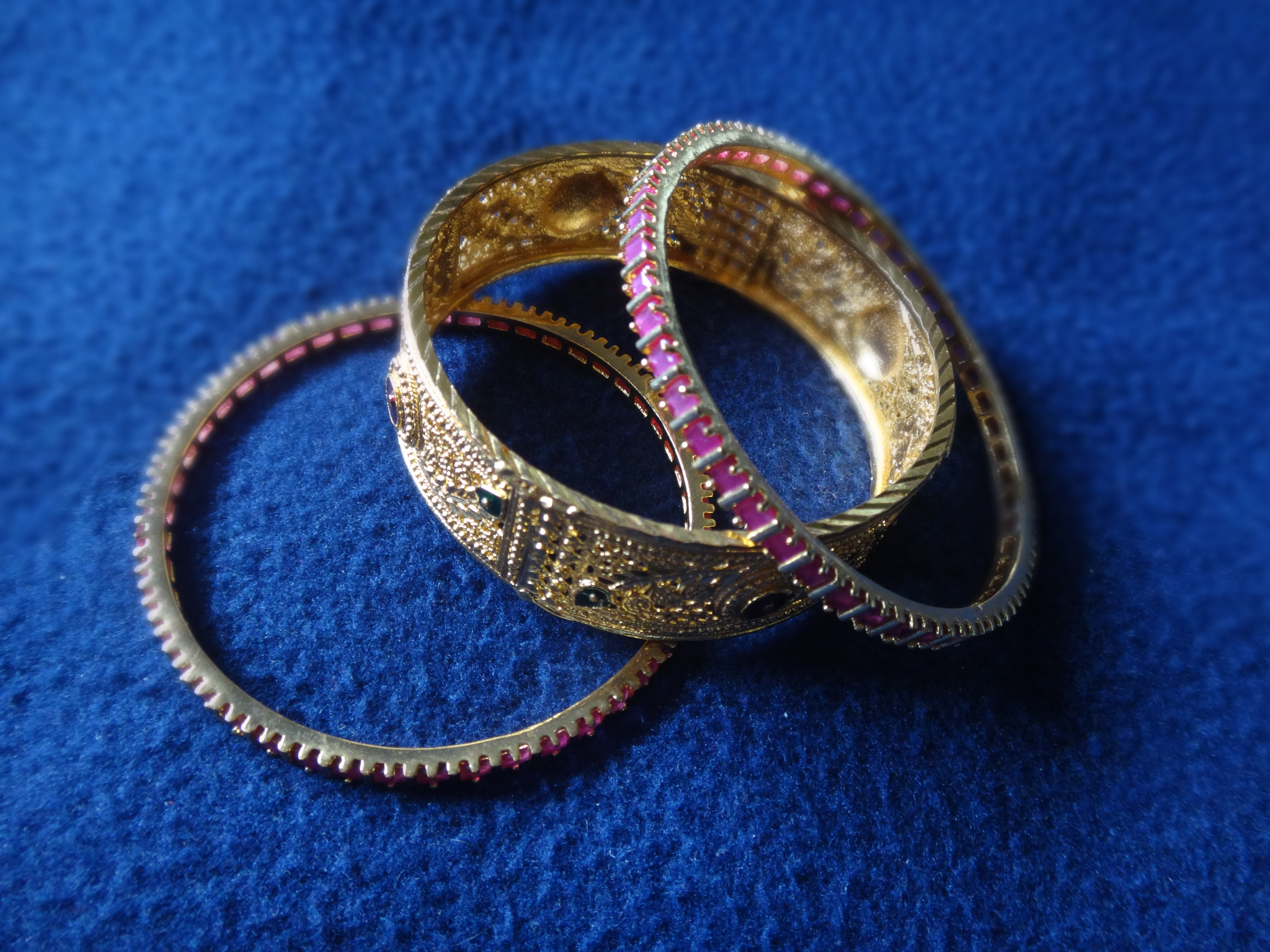
Metal bangles

Hard material or rigid bracelets, usually made from metal, wood, or plastic, are referred to as bangles or bangle bracelets. They can be smooth, textured or set with stones. In India, glass bangles are common. Made from ordinary glass that is about 3 to 6 millimetres (1/8 to 1/4 in) in width, they are worn in groups so that arm movement causes them to make a gracious sound rather like the clinking of wind chimes. In India, it is also common that young children will wear thin gold bangles on their hands and ankles. A common type is also Friendship bracelets.

=== Beaded ===
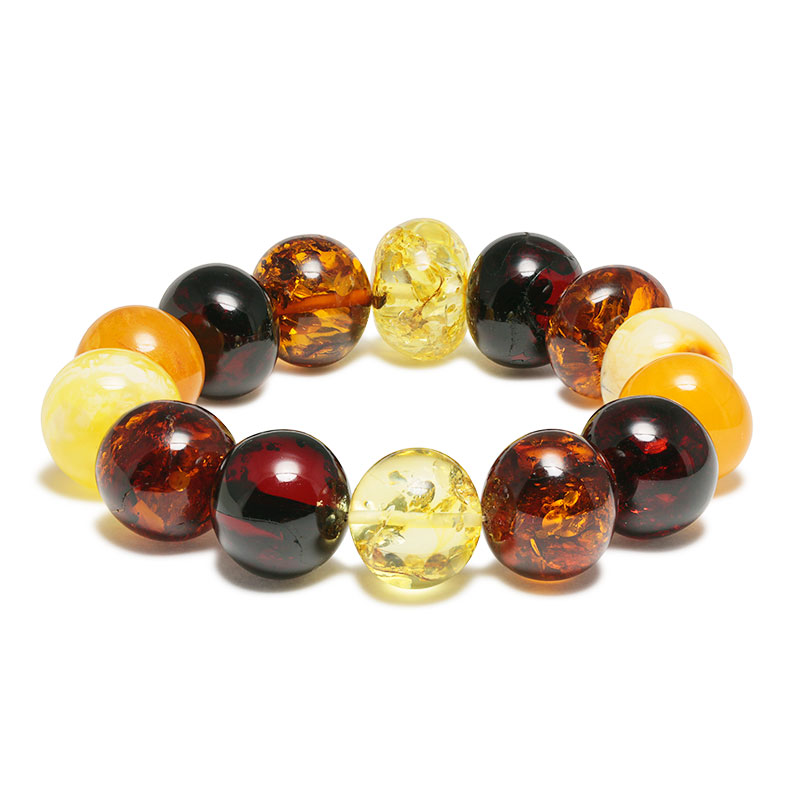
Amber beaded bracelet

Usually made from loose beads with a center hole and connected by a piece of string or elastic band through the holes. Most often made with wooden beads, plastic, glass or even crystal beads.

=== Charm ===
A charm bracelet carries pendants or trinkets which can be signifiers of important things, interests/hobbies, and memories in the wearer's life.

While traditional charms dangle, Italian charms feature individual pieces soldered flat onto the surface of the link.

=== Elastic ===
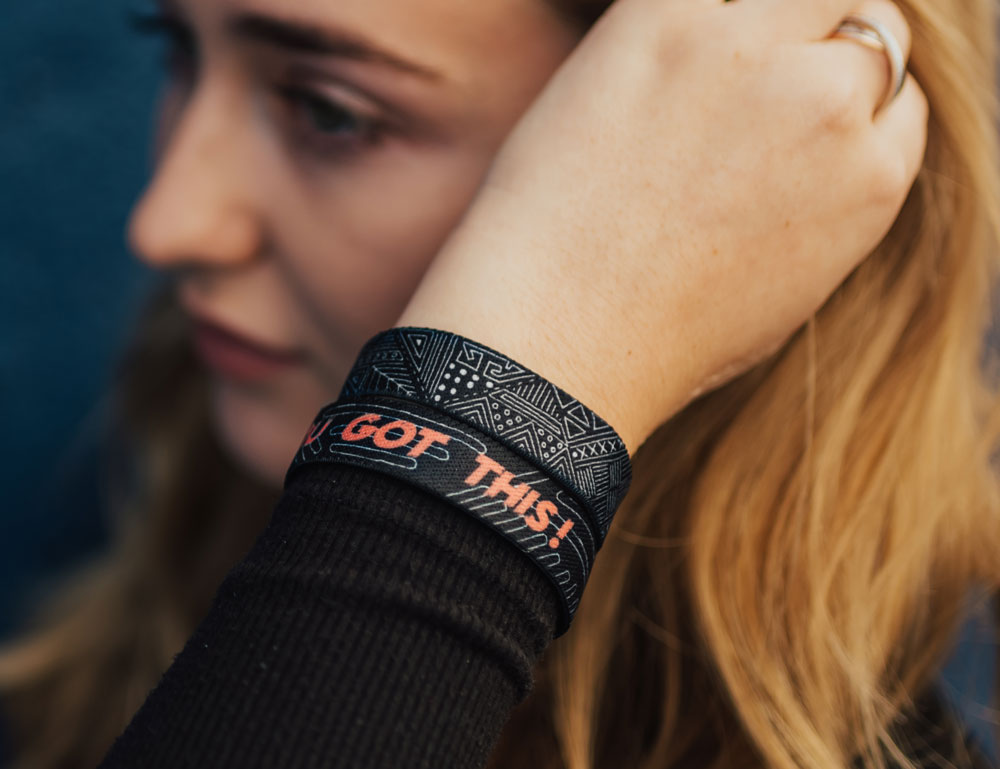
Elastic bracelet from Zox being worn.

Made from an elastic fabric or spandex material, elastic bracelets are typically sublimation printed with colorful designs and reversible. First created and made popular by Zox in the early 2010s, they've become more popular in the past decade.

=== Link ===
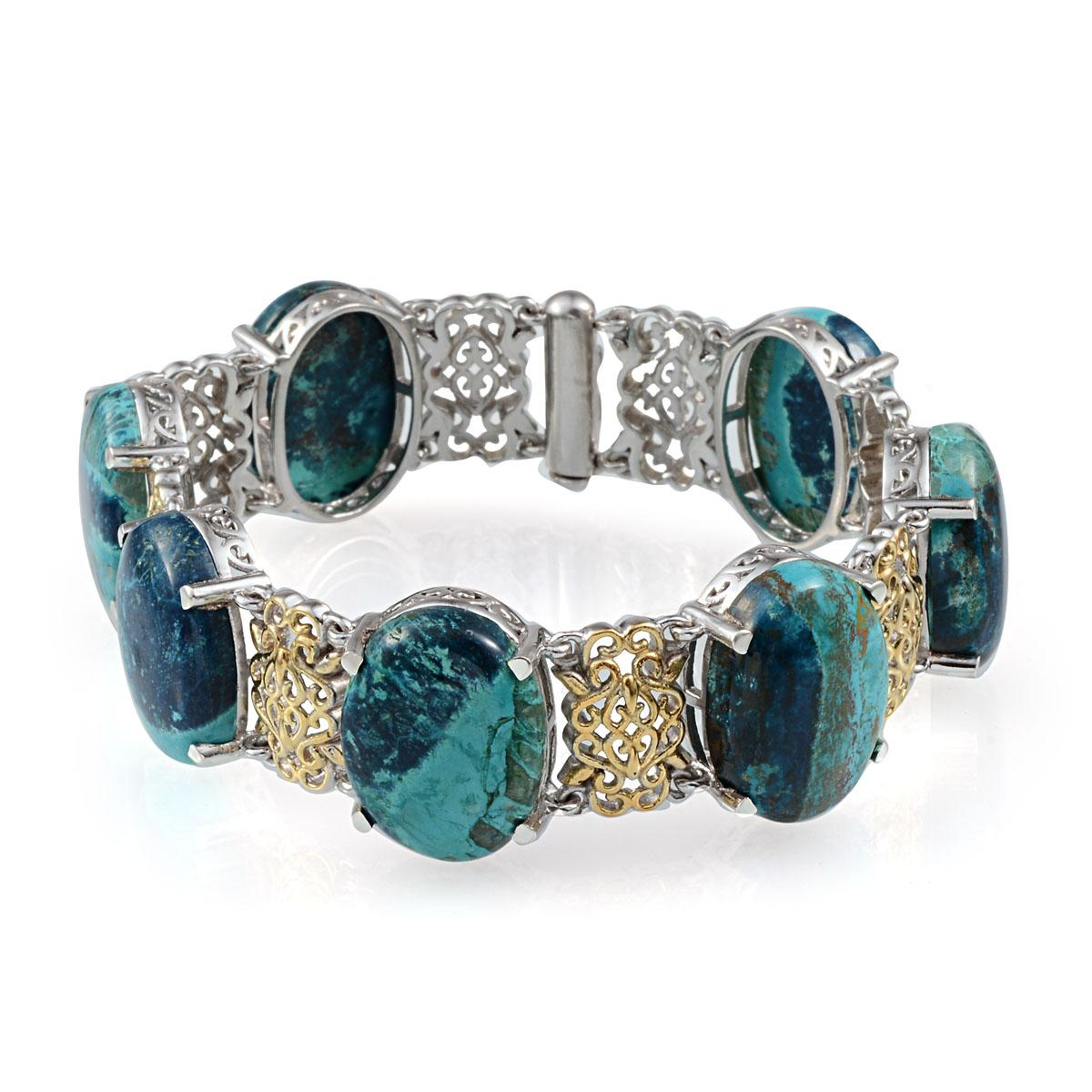
Link bracelet

Bracelets made from connecting or linking various or similar components or jewelry findings. Link bracelets can be made of a variety of materials including metals and gemstones.

=== Penannular ===
Penannular, meaning an incomplete circle, has been a very common form for bracelets, especially ones made in a single piece of a slightly flexible material such as metal or plastic. It is particularly popular in gold.

=== Slap ===
In the late 1980s and early 1990s, "slap bracelets"—flat, felt-covered metal strips that curved around one's wrist when gently hit against it—were a popular fad. Often adorned with neon colors and vivid graphics, these bracelets could be found at inexpensive retailers. A rumor eventually emerged that "slap bracelets" caused bleeding and puncture wounds and thus they fell out of style.

=== Sports ===
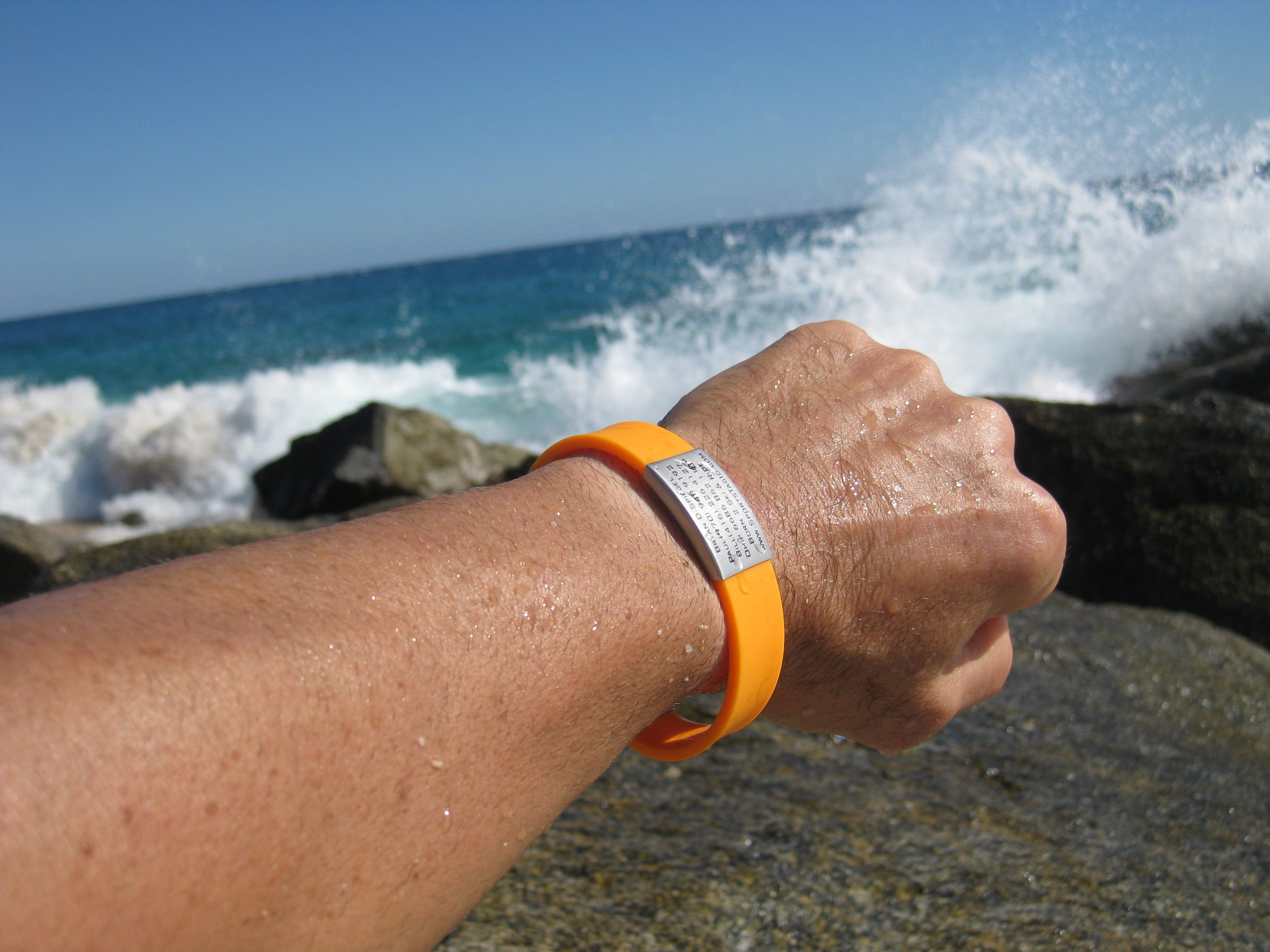
Silicone and stainless steel emergency ID sports bracelet (2010).

The use of colored silicone rubber as a material for producing sports bracelets was popularized by Nike and Lance Armstrong through the Yellow Livestrong wristband starting in May 2003. Their success has led to the silicone bracelet becoming a low cost tool for various awareness, information, and charity campaigns. This can be likened to the use of awareness ribbons for similar purposes. These bracelets are also known as "baller id bands", "baller bands" or "wristbands". They can also be referred to as rubber wristbands, silicone wristbands or gel wristbands. For sport climbing, bracelets are designed with climbing cords (dynamic rope) to serve as a mountain climbing gear.

=== Tennis ===
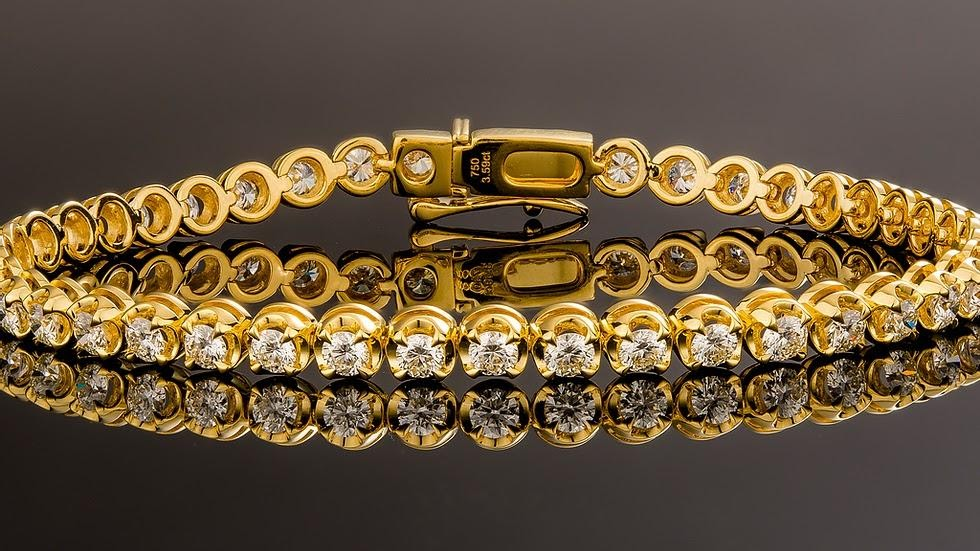
Diamond and gold in-line jewelry bracelet, a.k.a. "tennis bracelet".

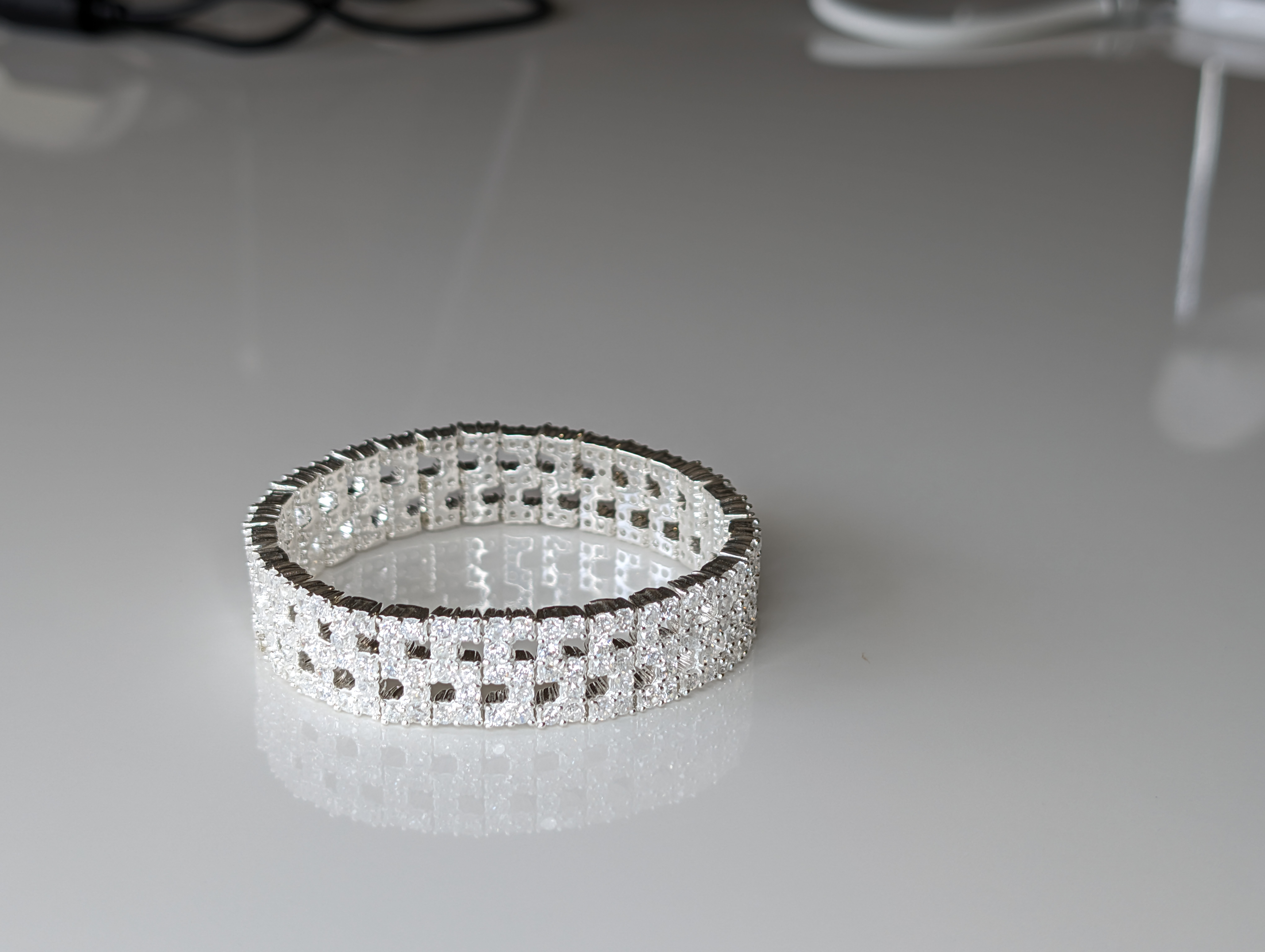
This bracelet has zircon gemstones. The metal is zinc alloy base with silver coating.

While playing a match at the 1978 U.S. Open, tennis player Chris Evert was wearing a diamond line bracelet, which fell from her wrist to the surface of the court. She said about this, "I dropped my tennis bracelet", and since then diamond line bracelets have also been called "tennis bracelets". (Note: Many sources date the incident to 1987.) The term tennis bracelet appears in print before this incident, but not necessarily referring to diamond line bracelets. An advertisement for a "sterling tennis bracelet" in The New Yorker in 1975, for example, shows a solid silver bangle featuring a tennis racket design, made by the Gorham Manufacturing Company.

Tennis bracelets are made up of many identical settings, each of which incorporates a hinge. The links are usually riveted or soldered from the sides of the bracelet allowing it to flex freely around the wrist with minimal movement left-to-right. A typical tennis bracelet will feature round diamonds set in four claw settings. Tennis bracelets can be adjusted to fit the wearer by removing links, this must be done by a jeweller.

== See also ==
- Anklet
- Armband
- Brace (armor)
- Friendship bracelet
- List of topics characterized as pseudoscience (bracelets with health/healing/performance benefits)
- Manillas
- Necklace
- POW bracelet
- Red string (Kabbalah)
- Slave bracelet
- Torc
