= Slap bracelet =

Bracelets worn by slapping them on the wrist

A video demonstration of the slap bracelet

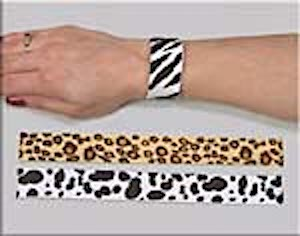
Slap bracelets

A slap bracelet (or snap bracelet) is a bracelet invented by Wisconsin teacher Stuart Anders in 1983, sold originally under the brand name of "Slap Wrap". Consisting of layered, flexible stainless steel bistable spring bands sealed within a fabric, silicone, or plastic cover, it can snap around a wrist when slapped on it with some force. It can have many different colors and/or designs.

== History ==
The original Slap Wraps were 23 cm (9.1 in) in length, 2.5 cm (0.98 in) wide, and made of steel 0.15 mm (0.0059 in) thick. Some knockoff versions used thinner steel, which was more likely to break and/or cut the wearer, the dangers of which first came to light in 1990, soon after they were released.

It was a fad among teenagers and younger children in the early 1990s. It was available in a wide variety of patterns and colors. The bracelet was banned in several schools following reports of injuries from worn out or modified versions.

In 2018, different slap bracelets were recalled: "The slap bracelet’s metal wristband can pierce the protective fabric around it and expose sharp edges, posing a laceration hazard to young children."
