= POW bracelet =

Commemorative bracelet

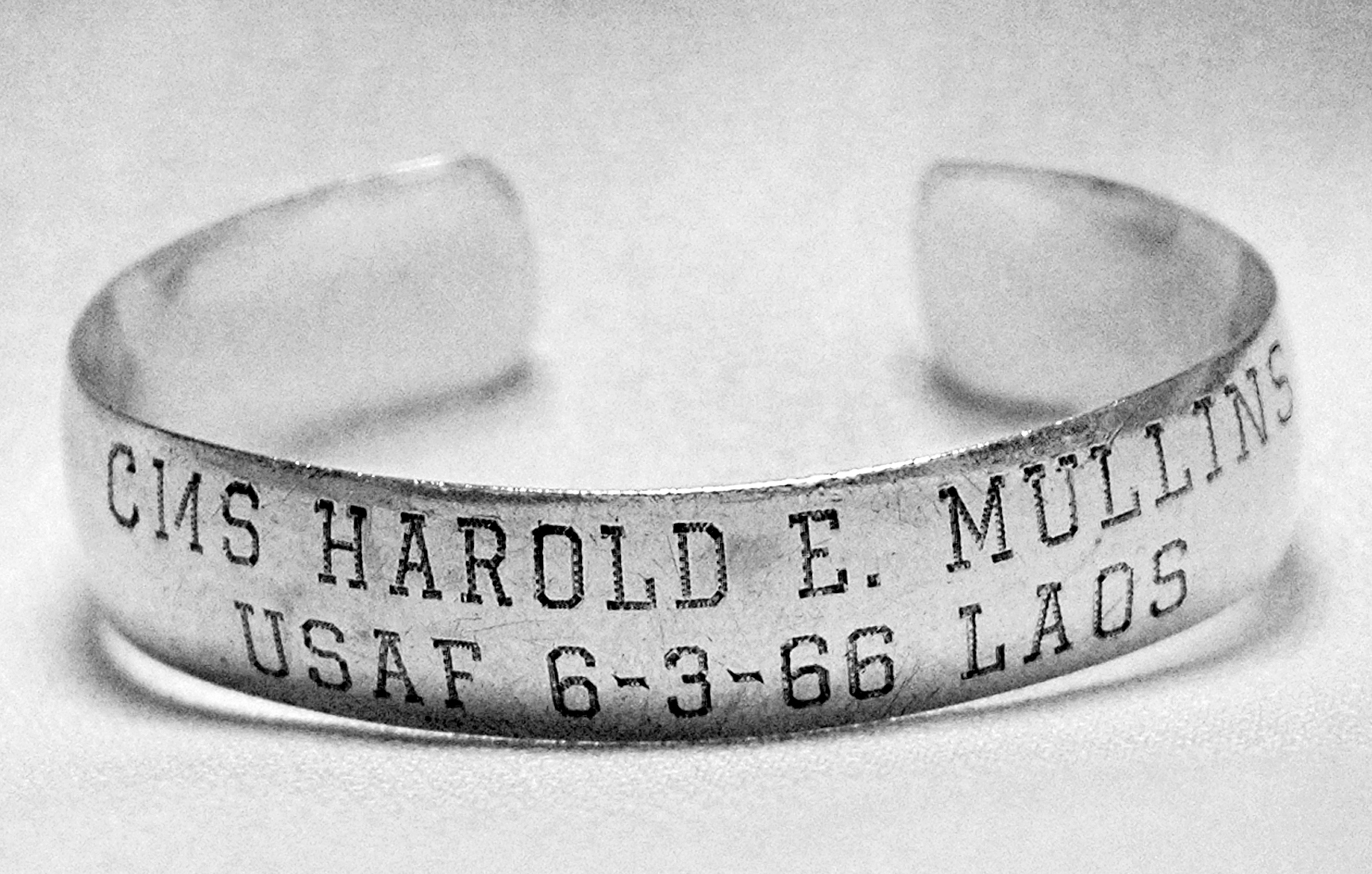
POW bracelet commemorating an American non-commissioned officer missing since 1966.

A POW bracelet, also known as a POW/MIA bracelet, is a nickel-plated or copper commemorative bracelet engraved with the rank, name, and loss date of an American servicemen captured or missing in Southeast Asia during the Vietnam War.

== History ==
The POW bracelet was conceived in 1970 by Carol Cates Brown and Kay Hunter, members of the California-based student group Voices in Vital America (VIVA), with the intention that American prisoners of war in Southeast Asia not be forgotten. Those who wore the bracelets vowed to leave them on until the serviceman named on the bracelet, or their remains, were returned to the United States, with the idea of returning the bracelet to the returning prisoner.

The bracelets, which cost 30 cents to produce, sold for $2.50 or $3.00 and increased VIVA's income to more than $7 million by 1973. Between 1970 and 1973, approximately 4 million bracelets were distributed. Politicians, astronauts, entertainers, and models wore the bracelets.

== See also ==
- POW/MIA flag
- Yellow ribbon
