= Slave bracelet =

Arabic wrist bracelet

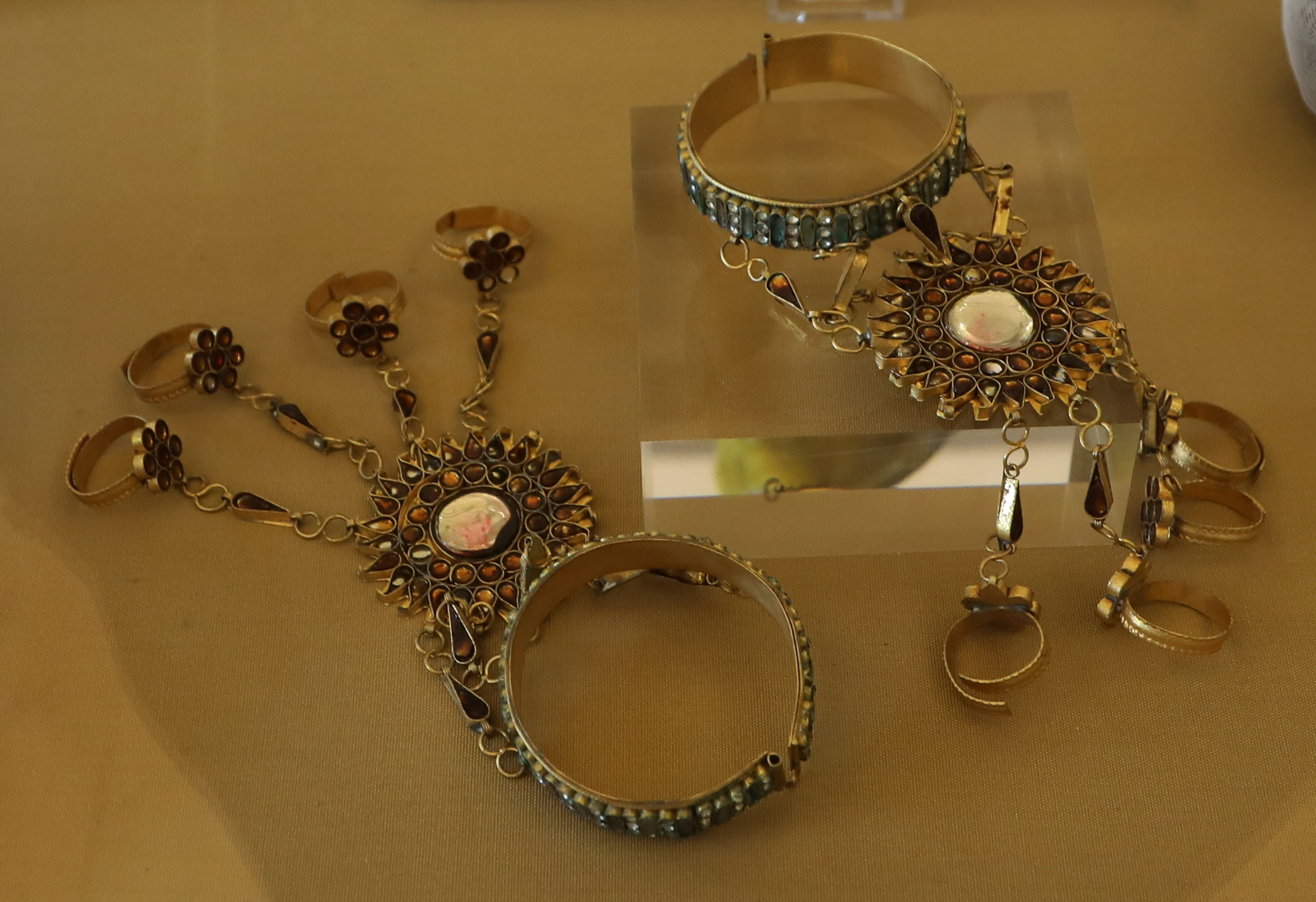
A pair of slave bracelets dating from the 1920s

Slave bracelet may refer to:

- A bangle worn by women, often above the elbow, made of metal or glass.
- A copper bracelet used as a medium of exchange in the West African slave trade, see Manillas.
- Any bracelet made of chain links.
- Hand chains, an Arab wrist bracelet joined to a ring by a chain.
- A bracelet worn by a slave (this meaning comes from BDSM fiction, e.g. John Norman's Gor series of novels; in this context, it may be a colloquial term for handcuffs).
- A panjas bracelet, like the tiger miraculous in Miraculous: Tales of Ladybug & Cat Noir

Slave bracelets are a piece of jewelry associated with several cultures. The term refers to the hand adornment often worn by belly dancers or associated with harem jewelry. The slave bracelet or hand chain consists of a bracelet that attaches to a ring via a chain, bejeweled links, or other ornate hand connector along the back of the hand. They have been a popular accessory worn by members of the Gothic subculture as well as those of the BDSM community, specifically dominant–submissive couples as a symbol of ownership between master (BDSM) and slave (BDSM).
