= Charivari (disambiguation) =

Charivari (also "shivaree") is the folk custom of mock serenading.

Charivari also may refer to:

- Charivari (decorative chain), an accessory to a Bavarian folk costume
- Charivari (Gruber), a 1981 musical composition
- Charivari (store), a New York City high fashion store from 1967 to 1998
- Charivari (novel), 1949, by American author John Hawkes
- Le Charivari, a French magazine (1832-1937)
- The London Charivari, alternative title for the British humor magazine Punch (1841-2002)

== See also ==
- Charivarius
- Sharovary
- Shivaree (disambiguation)
