= List of jewellery types =

This list of jewellery types is a listing of most types of jewellery made.

== Hair Ornaments ==
- Crowns
- Maang Tikka
- Headband
- Scrunchie
- Hair clip

== Arms ==
- Armlet (upper arm bracelets)
- Bangle
- Bracelet
  - Charm bracelet
    - Italian charm bracelet
  - Friendship bracelet
  - Gospel bracelet
- Cuff links
- Wristwatch

== Hands ==
- Ring
  - Championship ring
  - Class ring
  - Engagement ring
  - Navaratna ring
  - Pre-engagement ring
  - Wedding ring
- Chain ring-bracelet

== Body ==
- Belly chain
- Body piercing jewellery
- Breastplate
- Brooch
- Earring
- Chatelaine
- Necklace

== Feet ==
- Anklet
- Toe ring

== Special functions ==
- Amulet
- Celibacy vow ring
- Medical alert jewelry
- Membership pin
- Military dog tags
- Pledge pins
- Prayer jewelry
  - Japa malas
  - Prayer beads
  - Prayer rope
  - Rosary beads
- Puzzle jewelry
  - Puzzle ring
- Signet ring
- Thumb ring
- Gemstone Jewelry

== Components ==
- Cameo
- Emblem
- Findings
- Locket
- Medallion
- Pendant

== See also ==
- Art jewellery
- Foilbacks
