= Jewellery in the Pacific =

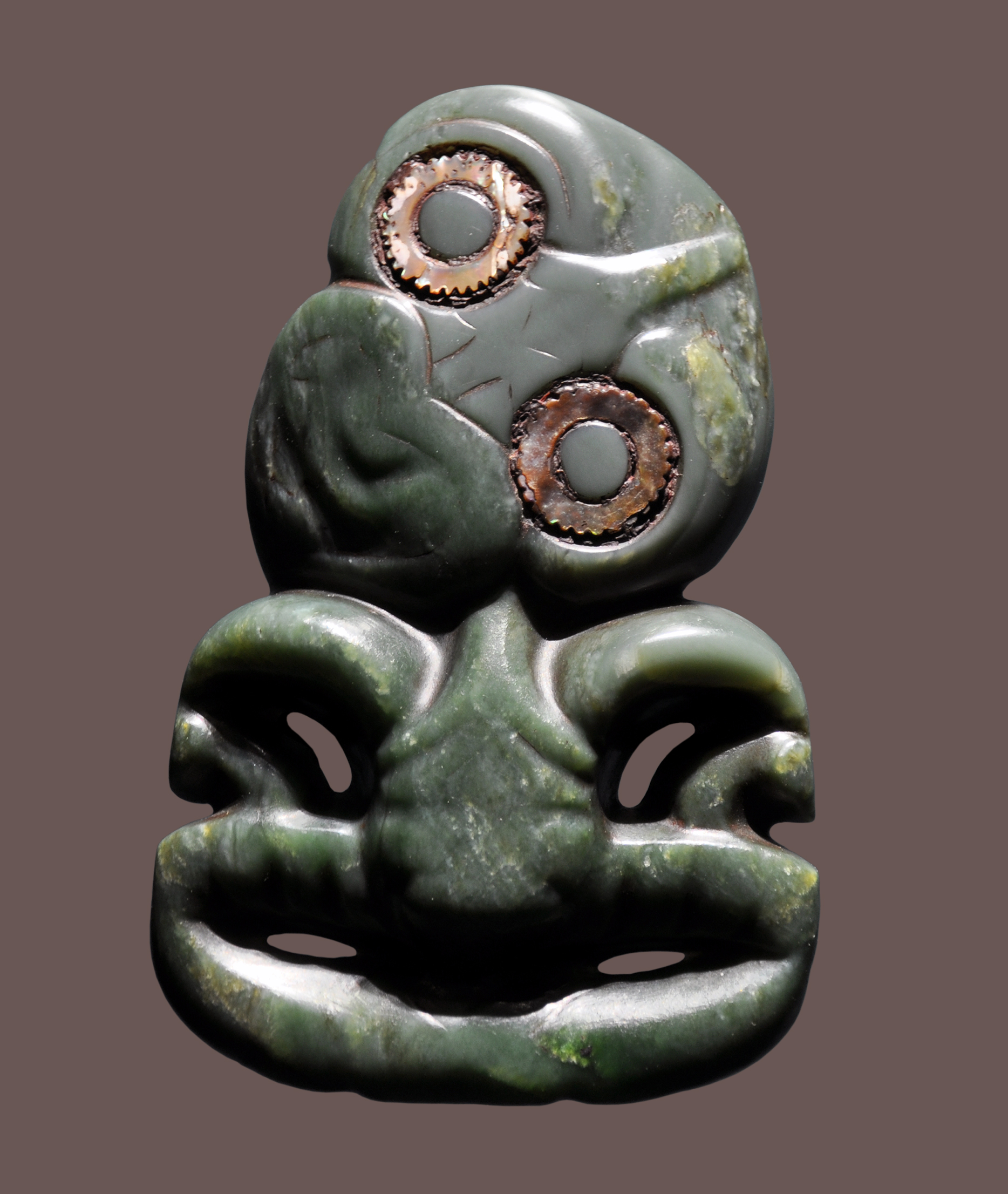
Māori hei-tiki, 1500-1800, jade (nephrite), from New Zealand, Musée du quai Branly – Jacques Chirac (Paris)

Jewellery making in the Pacific started later than in other areas, due to relatively recent human settlement. Early Polynesian jewellery, which was made of bone, wood and other natural materials, has not survived. The precise start of island jewellery-making is difficult to pinpoint, due to many of the island nations' founders migrating there from other areas, such as Tahiti.

Most Pacific jewellery is worn above the waist. Headdresses, necklaces, hair pins and arm and waist belts are the most common pieces amongst island cultures.

== Types and social meanings ==
The styles and types of jewellery in the Pacific change greatly from island to island, as does the purpose of wearing it. As in most cultures, jewellery in the Pacific is worn to symbolise the wearer's power, whether it be wealth or victory in battle. Jewellery in the Pacific, with the exception of Australia, is worn to be a symbol of either power, but in many cases across the Pacific, jewellery is worn to show fertility. As a prime example, the hei-tiki of the New Zealand Māori is said to be a sign of fertility. However, many historians suggest that the carved necklace has connections with Tiki, the first Māori, who also has strong ties with the symbolism of fertility. Historians also speculate that the reason the tiki is worn is that the Tiki is a product of the ancient belief of a god named Tiki. This supreme being is known to be ancient and not solely localised to the Māori, and is thought to date back to before the Māoris even settled in New Zealand.

Elaborate headdresses are worn by many Pacific cultures and some wear certain headdresses once they have killed an enemy in battle. The wearing of headdresses is particularly common in Papua New Guinea, where there are often many different types of headdress for different occasions. These headdresses are usually made out of vegetation, but designs often include birds of paradise feathers, including the highly sought-after King of Saxony feathers. The power associated with the headdresses in Papua New Guinea is phenomenal, perhaps stirred by the amount of work and craftsmanship that has gone into making such a feathered display.

Like the Papua New Guineans, New Zealand Māori wore feathered headdresses too to symbolize power. The now extinct huia feather was highly prized, with chiefs wearing white-tipped huia feathers to symbolise power over chiefs wearing monotone feathers. Huia feathers were revered as "taonga" or treasures by Māori and in later times, the European settlers. The huia feathers were often grouped in twos and were usually accompanied by a kiwi feather cloak, an ear piercing and commonly a small jade club. After Western colonisation, European woman began wearing the feathers to express their strong social standing.

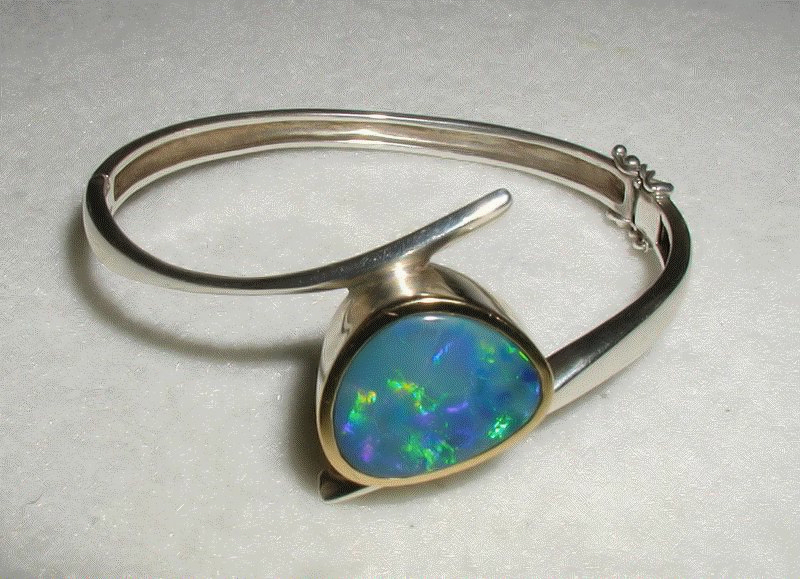
A modern opal bracelet from Australia

Pacific jewellery has now lost much of its former strong cultural meaning. Most Pacific jewellery now is created for the sole purpose of commercial and tourist profits. Indeed, some pieces of jewellery have become major symbols of the Pacific's lifestyle to tourists, such as leis in Hawaii, which are now commonly associated with that area and its laid back, tourist-friendly attitude. Another example is the previously mentioned New Zealand tiki, which is generally one of the more purchased jewellery types from the country.

Australia is notable for its large deposits of opals, with the country being the number one supplier of opals in the world. The richest source is at Lightning Ridge.

== Religion ==
In some regions of the Pacific, jewellery is still very much untouched by outside influences, and therefore very primal. Testaments to this are parts of Borneo and Papua New Guinea, which are still unexplored by Westerners. Tribesmen may wear boar bones through their noses, very much like the typical tribal cliché people outside these cultures use.

Much of the islands' tribal designs were lost due to the introduction of outside religions via the flood of Western missionaries that entered the area. Missionaries saw any type of tribal jewellery as a sign of the wearer's devotion to paganism. Thus many tribal designs were lost forever in the mass conversion to Christianity. Now, most traditional jewellery is created for tourists or under a newly found respect for the tribal designs. Indeed, many island nations are now rekindling the art of traditional jewellery making in an attempt to salvage lost designs or techniques. After the mass conversion to other religions, Pacific jewellery eventually adopted religious symbols in their jewellery designs. For example, many designs incorporated Christian symbols such as the cross.

Traditional pieces of island jewellery were occasionally made for religious purposes. Many pieces were created for tribal ceremonies, tattoo rituals and marriage. In fact, use of jewellery for religious functions in the Pacific was as common as in any other culture. Pieces were often handed down from generation to generation, further escalating the importance of the jewellery. Design was key in Pacific pieces: even simple shapes such as a background square could have a complicated meaning when placed with other symbols. Historians have conceded that this level of design is often lacking in other cultures.

== Examples ==
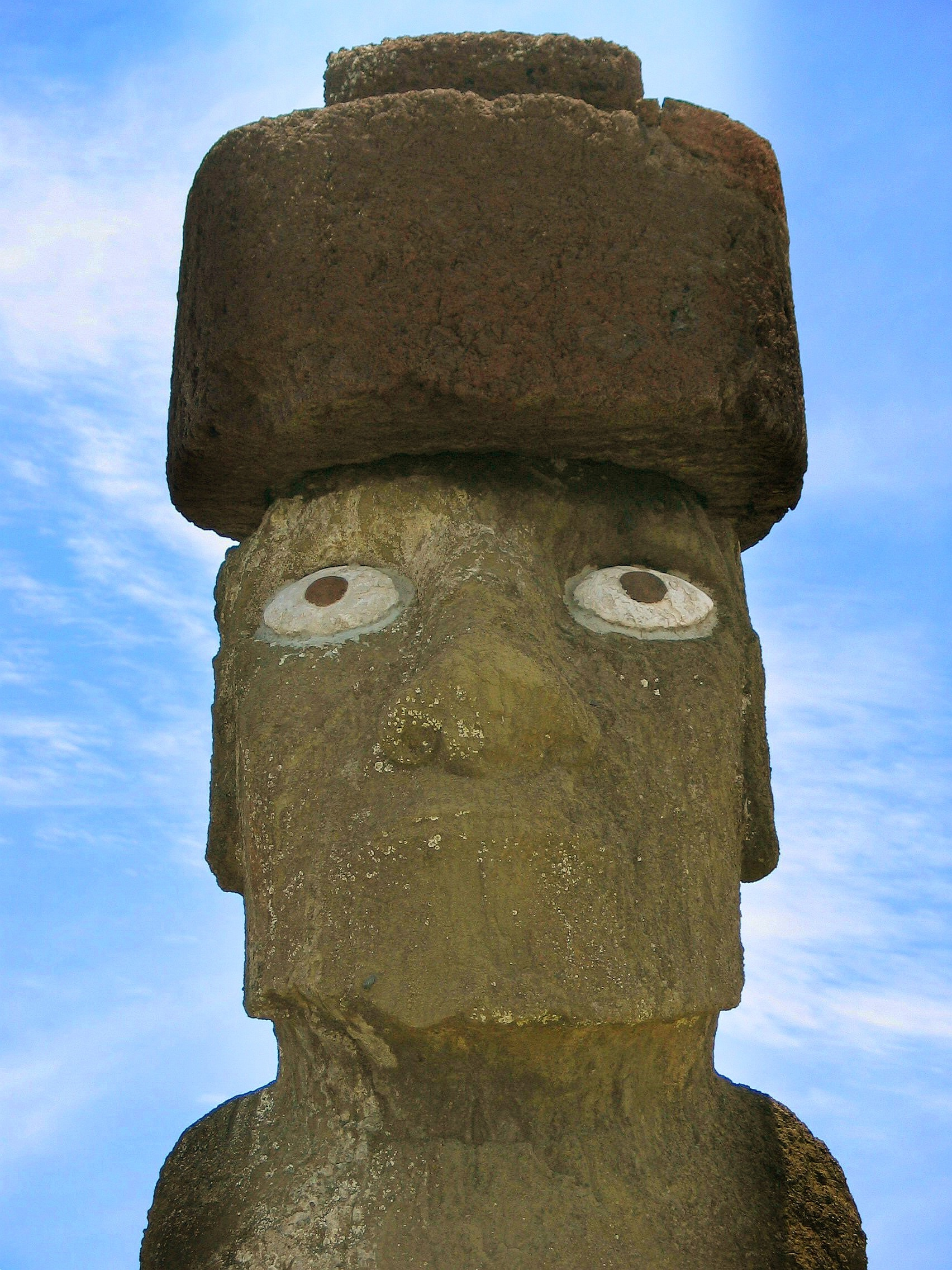
Restored moai with pukao (headdress) on Easter Island

Many examples of Pacific jewellery exist. As with the rest of the world, every Polynesian culture had at least one form of body adornment. Even the Rapa Nui people of Easter Island, a small island over 2,000 miles from any land mass, had jewellery. Examples of their jewellery can be found on the giant moai they left behind, some of which wear pukao headdresses. It is thought that the moai with these adornments depicted individuals of higher social standing, because in other cultures, people who could afford jewellery were considered wealthier and more important in ancient times.

One of the most recognisable pieces of jewellery tied to a culture is the Hawaiian lei. This floral necklace is given out when an outsider arrives, and thus is used widely as a commercial icon for travellers who visit the islands. Special candy leis have also been introduced for children's birthday parties.

Some nations are still less industrialized than other larger nations, for example, the island nation of Samoa. Although a haven for tourists, the country is still well below the poverty line and thus, jewellery that is not for commercial use, is still quite primitive. Craftsmen from the area still use natural materials to create their jewellery, and the way in which they go about making the jewellery is also often based on ancestral designs. Shells, bone, coconut and wood are all used in Samoan jewellery. Coir is often used in place of string.

Throughout the Pacific, some jewellery pieces are more common than others. For example, necklaces, earrings and headdresses of different sorts are all very common items used by Polynesians to adorn themselves. Some pieces, such as the wearing of masks, are only apparent in certain areas, such as Micronesia and with the aborigines of Australia. Breast plates were worn by the Māori, as well as many other small islands in the Pacific. Belts and adornments hung off them, are mainly situated around Papua New Guinea and its neighbours, while nose piercings are also found in that area. Overall, although jewellery pieces in the Pacific are very similar amongst the island nations, they are also varied greatly and each piece represents the wearer's beliefs, ancestry and nation to the observer.

== See also ==
- Jewellery
- List of jewellery types
- Oceania
