= Tous (company) =

Spanish fashion retailer

- Logo used since 2022

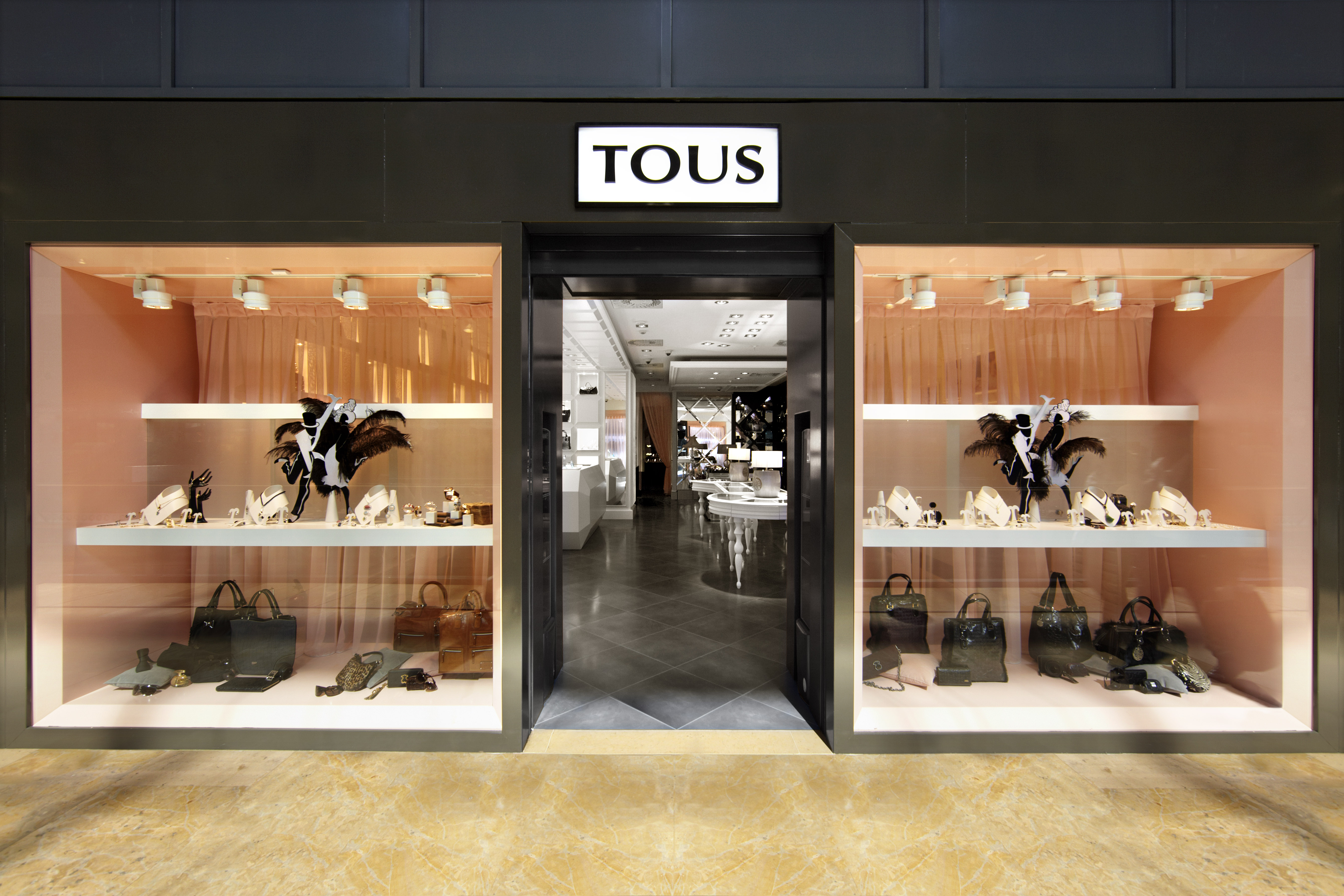
- Tous shop in the L'ILLA mall, Barcelona
- Type: Private
- Industry: Fashion; Jewelry
- Founded: 1920; 106 years ago
- Founder: Salvador Tous Blavi; Teresa Ponsa Mas
- Headquarters: Manresa, Catalonia (Spain),
- Area served: Worldwide
- Key people: Alba Tous (President); Susana Sánchez (Chief Executive Officer, since September 2025); Rosa Tous (Corporate Vice President); Marta Tous (Creative Director)
- Revenue: €523 million (2024)
- Owner: Tous family (100%, since 2024)
- Number of employees: approx. 4,000 (2024)
- Website: www.tous.com

Tous (Catalan pronunciation: [tɔus]) is a Spanish jewelry, accessories and fashion retailer which was founded by Salvador Tous Blavi and Teresa Ponsa Mas. It is based in Catalonia, Spain, and as of 2024 is wholly owned by the founding family.

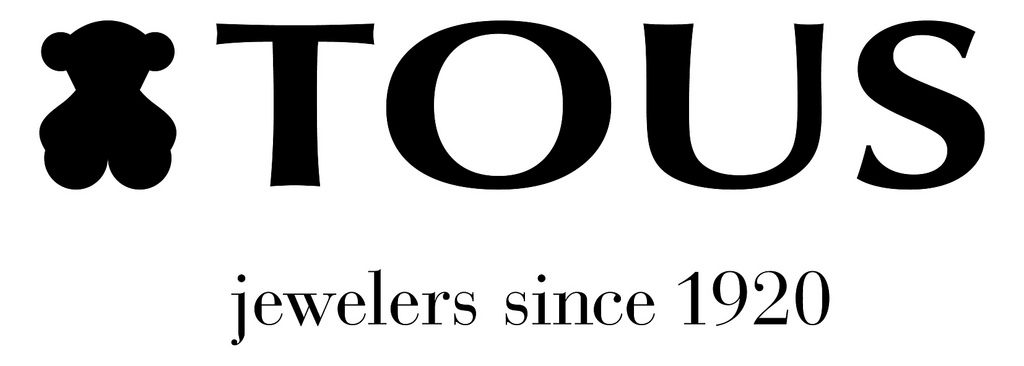
Tous logo used from 1920 to 2022

== History ==
In 1920, Salvador Tous Blavi and his wife Teresa Ponsa Mas opened a small watch repair workshop that progressively grew in prominence in the jewelry industry. In 1965, Salvador Tous, the son of the founder, married Rosa Oriol — the pair pooled their talents, experience and creativity for the purpose of designing a new style of jewelry. As of 2024, the company operates more than 600 stores in more than 40 countries, with Mexico, the United States and Poland as its main markets after Spain.

Since 1920, TOUS has created jewelry as the company's core-business, but also produces a broad range of accessories, such as bags, watches, perfumes, eyeglasses, textiles and small leather goods. As of 2012, the company produced 30 annual collections. Since 2014, the company has produced more than one million jewelry pieces a year at its own factory in Sabadell.

In 2015, the company sold a 25% stake to the Swiss investment fund Partners Group, the first time it had opened its capital to an outside investor. The Tous family repurchased that stake in December 2024, returning to full family ownership.

== Contemporary era ==
There was a national expansion during the 1980s. The Tous' four daughters — Rosa, Alba, Laura and Marta — subsequently joined the family business, and by the 2020s held senior corporate roles: Alba Tous as group president, Rosa Tous as corporate vice president, and Marta Tous as creative director, also leading the brand's SUOT Studio design lab and the family's holding company. In September 2025, Susana Sánchez was appointed chief executive officer, succeeding Carlos Soler-Duffo after 13 years with the company; Sánchez, previously CEO of Portuguese retailer Parfois, reports directly to chairwoman Alba Tous.

For the first time, the company has collaborated with Eugenia Martinez de Irujo, the daughter of the Duchess of Alba. Consolidated over numerous years, the working relationship with the Duchess of Montoro, which is her title, has led to the development of a signature collection; "Iluminada", "Leyendas" and "Cercle" are some of her recent product releases.

In the 1990s, the international expansion began with the opening of the brand's first store in Japan; countries like Mexico and the United States followed. Kylie Minogue has been one of several celebrity "images" of the brand name and have contributed to consolidating TOUS' international popularity. In 2011, TOUS chose Jennifer Lopez as the image for its Spring–Summer campaign. In this same year, TOUS also launched a special collaboration with Manolo Blahnik for the creation of the "Manolo Blahnik for TOUS" collection; the collaborative release consisted of pendants that are a faithful reproduction, in gold and in silver, of the famous "Campari" shoe.

The company's estimated sales (in 2010/2011) were €450 million in total sales and €30 million in watches.

In 2018, designer Pepa Salazar created a new interpretation of the brand's bear emblem. In February 2024, designer Ludovic de Saint Sernin presented jewelry from the brand during a runway show at New York Fashion Week.

== Brand evolution and recent projects ==
In 2021, to mark its centenary, Tous carried out a brand evolution that included a new corporate purpose ("We Craft a World of Joy"), a redefinition of its values around boldness, creativity and humor, and the launch of the "Bold Bear", a three-dimensional version of the brand's classic bear emblem.

In 2023, the company launched SUOT Studio, a creative laboratory led by Marta Tous focused on exploring new forms of expression in contemporary jewelry. In 2025, Tous renewed Tous Atelier, its high-jewelry line, with a contemporary creative direction drawing on the brand's artisanal heritage.

== Causes ==
In 2012, TOUS is listed as a partner of the (RED) campaign, together with other brands such as Nike, Inc., Girl, American Express and Converse. The campaign's mission is to prevent the transmission of the HIV from mother to child by 2015 (the campaign's byline is "Fighting For An AIDS Free Generation").

== See also ==
- Art jewelry
- List of jewelry types
- Jewelry cleaning
