= Shivaree =

Shivaree may refer to:

- Shivaree (custom), or charivari, a clamorous public hazing
- Shivaree (band), an American country band (1997–2007)
- Shivaree (play), by William Mastrosimone
- Shivaree (TV series), an American music variety show (1965–1966)
- "The Shivaree", a season 3 episode of The Waltons
- "Shivaree", an episode of The Rifleman

== See also ==
- Charivari (disambiguation)
