= Piano Concerto (Gruber) =

The Piano Concerto is a composition for piano and orchestra by the Austrian composer Heinz Karl Gruber. The work was commissioned for the pianist Emanuel Ax by the New York Philharmonic, the Royal Stockholm Philharmonic Orchestra, the Berlin Philharmonic, and the Tonhalle Orchester Zürich. It was composed from 2014 through 2016 and was given its world premiere by Emanuel Ax and the New York Philharmonic under the direction of Alan Gilbert at David Geffen Hall on January 5, 2017.

== Composition ==
=== Background ===
The concerto mixes the styles of cabaret music into the traditional orchestral setting. Gruber first conceived the piece while composing the nightclub scene for his 2014 opera Tales from the Vienna Woods. In the score program notes, he wrote, "I was intrigued how the 'shimmy' music played by the cabaret band is itself simple and emotionless, but forms an effective counterpoint to the powerful drama in the foreground. This was the bud from which my concerto grew."

=== Structure ===
The concerto has a duration of roughly 23 minutes and is cast in one continuous movement. In the score program notes, Gruber described the composition as "progressing through a chain of developing variations," which "is closest in form to a Sinfonietta with piano solo."

=== Instrumentation ===
The work is scored for a solo piano and a large orchestra comprising two flutes (one doubling piccolo), two oboes, two clarinets, bass clarinet (doubling clarinet), alto saxophone, soprano saxophone (doubling tenor saxophone), three bassoons (one doubling contrabassoon), four horns, three trumpets, three trombones, tuba, timpani, percussion, celeste (doubling keyboard glockenspiel), harp, and strings.

== Reception ==
The music critic Anthony Tommasini of The New York Times described the piece as "an intricate and provocative score" and "a 24-minute single-movement concerto that unfolds with inexorable sweep and rhythmic persistence, even during some stream-of-consciousness stretches." He further wrote:

It begins with deceptively calm piano chords that provoke nervous bleeps from the orchestra. Soon the piano plays an arching theme in right-hand octaves, like some passing nod to those soaring-melody moments of Romantic piano concertos. From there, the piece adopts a mode of continuous shifts and fractured phrases. The piano will slip into an episode of skittish two-part counterpoint, while orchestra instruments look for places to intrude with misbehaving outbursts. Stark passages of pointillist writing in the piano turn wild, like avant-garde jazz improvisations. The piano continues to twist and turn, with dreamy harmonies segueing into frenetic, toccata-like eruptions. The orchestra sometimes swells with startling Expressionist angst. Yet for all the gnashing harmonies and splintered phrases, the music is run through with hints of Kurt Weill cabaret. There is almost always some jaunty, rhythmic riff bustling in the orchestra."

David Wright of the New York Classical Review similarly lauded the piece's "glittering, Gershwin-like piano syncopations and lush orchestral sonorities à la Rachmaninoff."

Conversely, Jay Nordlinger of The New Criterion was more critical of the work, remarking, "I think the Gruber Piano Concerto is a piece that interested and amused the composer, in his own head. That is important. Did it interest and amuse me? Not especially. I admired the work—it is done by a craftsman, and a genuine spirit—but I found it tedious. It seemed to me more an exercise in preparation for a real piece than the piece itself."
