= Charm bracelet =

Chain bracelet on which collectible charms may be hung

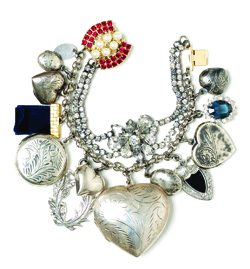
Charm bracelet with multiple charms

A charm bracelet is a type of bracelet which carries personal jewelled ornaments or "charms", such as decorative pendants or trinkets. The decorative charms usually carry personal or sentimental attachment by the owner.

== History ==
The wearing of charms may have begun as a form of amulet or talisman due to a belief it wards off evil spirits or bad luck.

During the pre-historic period, jewellery charms would be made from shells, animal-bones and clay. Later charms were made out of gems, rocks, and wood.

For instance, there is evidence from Africa that shells were used for adornments around 75,000 years ago. In Germany intricately carved mammoth tusk charms have been found from around 30,000 years ago. In ancient Egypt charms were used for identification and as symbols of faith and luck. Charms also served to identify an individual to the gods in the afterlife.

During the Roman Empire, Christians would use tiny fish charms hidden in their clothing to identify themselves to other Christians. Jewish scholars of the same period would write tiny passages of Jewish law and put them in amulets round their necks to keep the law close to their heart at all times. Medieval knights wore charms for protection in battle. Charms also were worn in the Middle Ages to denote family origin and religious and political convictions.

Charm bracelets have been the subject of several waves of trends. The first charm bracelets were worn by Assyrians, Babylonians, Persians, and Hittites and began appearing from 600 – 400 BC.

For example, Queen Victoria wore charm bracelets that started a fashion among the European noble classes. She was instrumental to the popularity of charm bracelets, as she “loved to wear and give charm bracelets. When her beloved Prince Albert died, she even made “mourning” charms popular; lockets of hair from the deceased, miniature portraits of the deceased, charm bracelets carved in jet.”

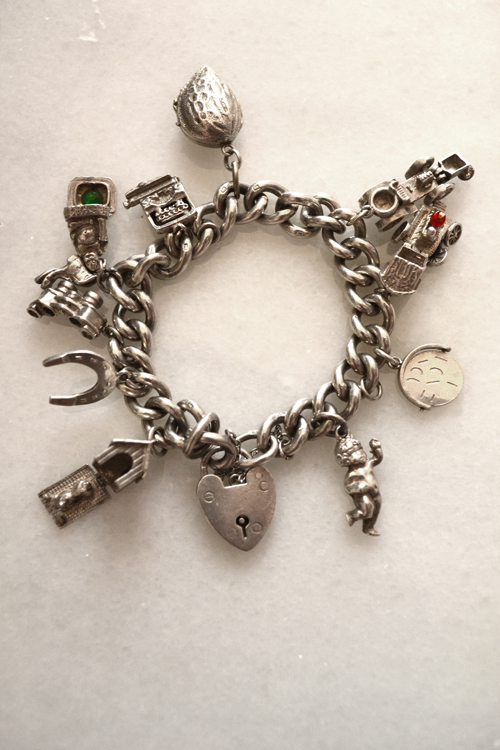
An antique silver charm bracelet.

In 1889, Tiffany and Co. introduced their first charm bracelet — a link bracelet with a single heart dangling from it, a bracelet which is an iconic symbol for Tiffany today.

Despite the Great Depression, during the 1920s and 1930s platinum and diamonds were introduced to charm bracelet manufacturing.

Soldiers returning home after World War II brought home trinkets made by craftsmen local to the area where they were fighting to give to loved ones. American teenagers in the 1950s and early 1960s collected charms to record the events in their lives. Screen icons like Elizabeth Taylor and Joan Crawford helped to fuel the interest and popularity of charm bracelets.

Although interest and production waned through the latter part of the 20th century, there was a resurgence of popularity after 2000 and collectors eagerly sought out vintage charms. Inspired by the movie Pirates of the Caribbean, bracelets with little charms of swords, crosses and skulls were introduced as a fashion trend during winter 2006.

== Italian charm bracelet ==
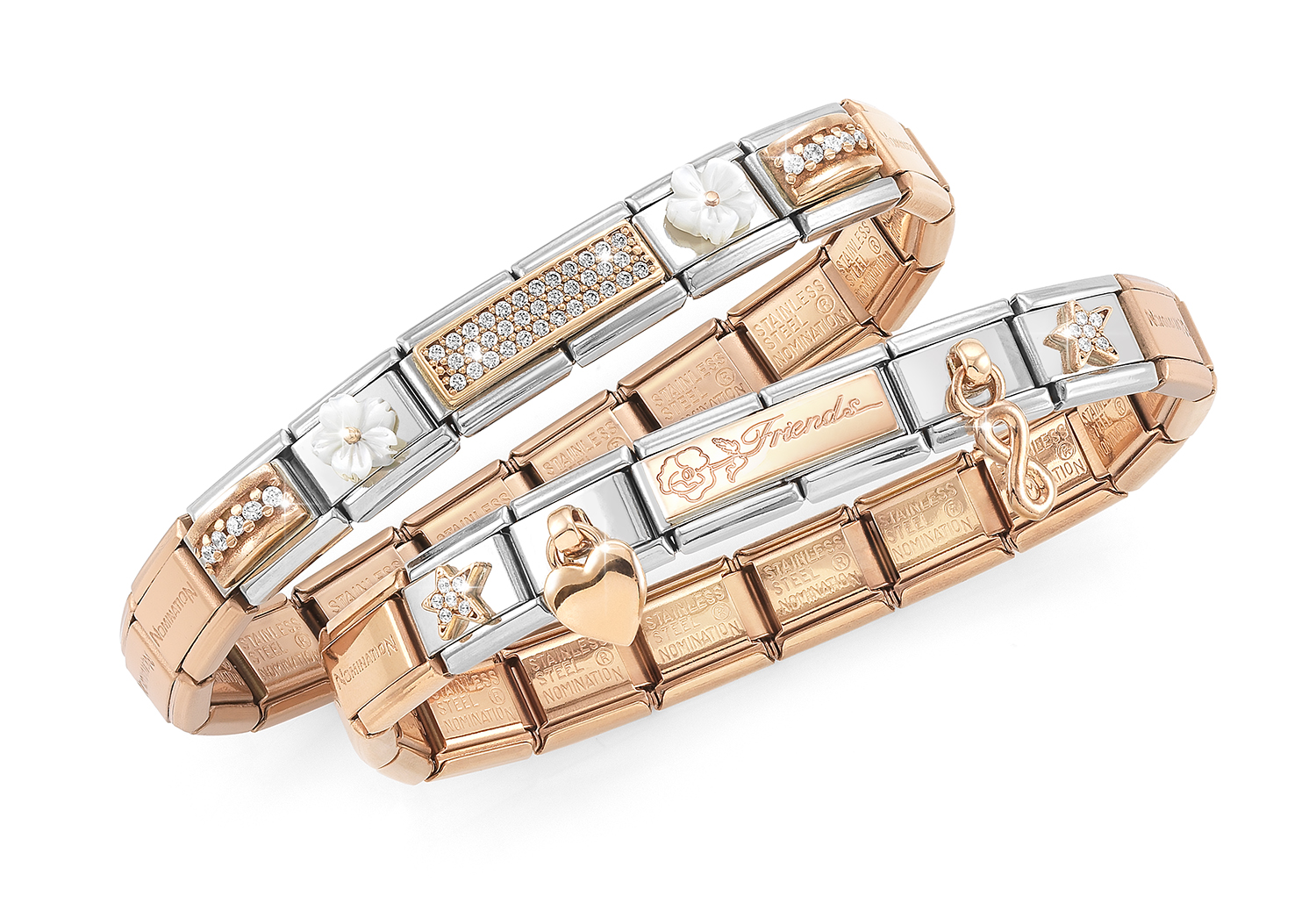
Italian Charm bracelet

An Italian Charm bracelet, also known in the USA as a Nomination bracelet, is a series of individual modular links hooked together on a stretchy band to form a single charm bracelet. A typical Italian charm bracelet comprises eighteen charm links. Each link features a charming face (design or image) soldered onto the actual charm link.

In 1987, an Italian jewelry company Nomination, based in Sesto Fiorentino, Italy, introduced the Composable line, featuring modular bracelets made of stainless steel. It had later become known as the “Italian charm bracelets”. People would add links to update their bracelets with symbols that told the story of the important events, milestones, and achievements in their lives, as well as hobbies and goals. In the 1990s, American tourists noticed the style and brought it to the United States. And in the late ‘90s and early 2000s, Italian charm bracelets became popularized in the US.

By 2023, Italian charm bracelets reclaimed popularity, notably adorned by "Love Island" Season 9's Anna-May Robey and creating buzz on TikTok.

Nomination stood out for its customizable bracelets, composed of modular charms that snugly interconnect, akin to a stretch band, lying flat on the wrist. These pieces, often crafted from stainless steel and adorned with materials like 18k gold, 9k gold, 925 silver, and an array of gemstones, catered mainly to young women, though men's models were also available.

== See also ==
- Charivari (decorative chain)
- Memento mori
- Souvenir
- Mobile phone charm

== Bibliography ==
- Tracey Zabar (2004). Charmed Bracelets. Stewart, Tabori and Chang.
- Joanne Schwartz; Robert N. Schwartz (2004). Charms and Charm Bracelets: The Complete Guide. Schiffer Publishing.
- Albert Jade; Ki Hackney (2005). The Charm of Charms. Harry N. Abrams.
