= Heinz Karl Gruber =

Austrian composer, conductor, double bass player and singer

Heinz Karl "Nali" Gruber (born 3 January 1943), who styles himself HK Gruber professionally, is an Austrian composer, conductor, double bass player and singer. He is a leading figure of the so-called Third Viennese School.

== Career ==
Gruber is said to be a descendant (though the descent remains obscure) of Franz Xaver Gruber, composer of the carol Stille Nacht (Silent Night). He was born in Vienna. From 1953 to 1957 Gruber was a member of the Vienna Boys' Choir, acquiring his nickname 'Nali' (from his snoring, he believes). He studied at the Vienna Hochschule für Musik, his composition teachers being Alfred Uhl, Erwin Ratz and Hanns Jelinek, and later Gottfried von Einem, with whom he also studied privately. In 1961 Gruber joined the ensemble die reihe as a double bass player, and became principal bass of the Vienna Tonkünstler Orchestra in 1963. In 1968, with his composer friends Kurt Schwertsik and Otto M. Zykan and the violinist Ernst Kovacic, he co-founded the 'MOB-art & tone-ART' ensemble, partly to perform their own repertoire (which included a short piece by Gruber, Bossa Nova, which rapidly became a hit tune) and partly that of Mauricio Kagel. The ensemble may be regarded as the cradle of what has been called the 'Third Viennese School', of which Gruber is now the best-known representative.

Like Schwertsik, Gruber had been taught in the post-Schoenbergian style of the Second Viennese School, but – also like Schwertsik – rapidly came to his own personal accommodation to tonality and older Viennese traditions. The critic Paul Driver has written of Gruber: ‘Neo-romantic, neo-tonal, neo-expressionistic, neo-Viennese: he isn’t any of those things, so much as a sentient (and downright accomplished) composer who keeps responding to whatever musical stimulus, be it highbrow or lowbrow, 12-tone or 7-tone, bitter or sweet, that comes his way’.

Gruber had been composing – and also playing jazz – from his student days, but achieved international fame in 1978 with Frankenstein!!, a 'pan-demonium' for chansonnier and orchestra (or large ensemble) on poems from allerleirausch, a collection of children's verse by his friend, the absurdist and Viennese-dialect poet H. C. Artmann, which he performed as singer around the world in the following few years. He and Schwertsik shared a 'Composers' Portrait' feature at the 1979 Berlin Festival, and Gruber has subsequently been ranked among Austria's leading composers. As a performer (conductor, singer, bass player) he has been involved in music by Peter Maxwell Davies, Hanns Eisler, and Kurt Weill, and made notable CD recordings of the latter two composers.

In September 2009 Gruber was appointed composer/conductor of the BBC Philharmonic Orchestra in succession to James MacMillan.

== Selected worklist ==
=== Stage works ===
- Die Vertreibung aus dem Paradies, melodrama for speakers and instrumentalists (1966)
- Gomorra, opera to a libretto by Richard Bletschacher (1970–96)
- Gloria von Jaxtberg (Gloria, a Pigtale), 2-act music-theatre for 5 singers and 9 session musicians, plus harp (1992–4)
- Der Herr Nordwind, opera in 2 parts (2003–5)

=== Orchestral ===
- Concerto for Orchestra, op.3 (1960)
- Manhattan Broadcasts for light orchestra (1962–4)
- fürbass, Concerto for double bass and orchestra (1965)
- Revue for chamber orchestra, op.22 (1968; first movement recomposed as Vergrößerung for orchestra, 1971)
- Phantom-Bilder auf dem Spur eines verdächtigen Themas (Photo-fit Pictures on the trail of a suspected theme) for small orchestra (1977)
- Violin Concerto No.1 ‘... aus schatten duft gewebt ...’ (1978)
- Rough Music – Concerto for percussion and orchestra (1983)
- Charivari – An Austrian Journal for orchestra (1983)
- Violin Concerto No.2 Nebelsteinmusik for violin and strings (1988), premièred by Ernst Kovacic who was both soloist and director at the première with the Vienna Chamber Orchestra on 10 July 1988 at the St Florian Festival, Sankt Florian, Austria.
- Cello Concerto (1989), written for Yo-Yo Ma, who gave the world première with the Boston Musica Viva under Richard Pittman on 3 August 1989 at Tanglewood.
- Aerial, concerto for trumpet and orchestra (1998–9), written for Håkan Hardenberger who premièred the piece with the BBC Symphony under Neeme Järvi at the Royal Albert Hall, London on 29 July 1999 as part of the BBC Proms.
- Zeitfluren, Concerto for Chamber Orchestra (2001), premièred by the London Sinfonietta conducted by the composer at the Paul Sacher Halle, Basel on 9 November 2001.
- Dancing in the Dark, orchestra (2002), premièred by the Wiener Philharmoniker under Sir Simon Rattle in the Musikverein, Vienna on 11 January 2003.
- Hidden Agenda for orchestra (2006), premièred by the BBC Symphony directed by the composer at KKL Konzertsaal, Lucerne on 20 August 2006 as part of the 2006 Lucerne Festival.
- Busking for trumpet solo, string orchestra and accordion & banjo duo (2007), written for Swedish virtuoso Håkan Hardenberger, who premièred the piece with the Amsterdam Sinfonietta conducted by the composer at the Muziekgebouw aan 't IJ, Amsterdam on 17 May 2008.
- Northwind Pictures (2003-2005/2010-11), orchestral suite drawn the opera der herr nordwind, premièred by the Tonkünstler-Orchester Niederösterreich under Gruber at the Grafenegg Music Festival, near Vienna, on 4 September 2011. The U.K. première of the work is given by the BBC Philharmonic under the composer at Bridgewater Hall, Manchester on 3 February 2012.
- into The Open ... for percussion and orchestra (2010), premièred by the BBC Philharmonic under John Storgårds at the Royal Albert Hall, London, as part of the 2015 BBC Proms.
- Piano Concerto (2014–2016), premièred by Emanuel Ax and the New York Philharmonic under Alan Gilbert at David Geffen Hall, New York City on 5 January 2017.

=== Brass ===
- Demilitarized Zones, March-Paraphrase for brass band (1979)

=== Vocal and choral ===
- Mass for chorus and ensemble (1960)
- 3 Songs by Rabindranath Tagore for baritone, ensemble & text (1961)
- Frankenstein!!, a pan-demonium for chansonnier and orchestra (or chamber orchestra) on verses of HC Artmann (1976–77; developed from voice-ensemble Frankenstein Suite, 1971)
- Zeitstimmung for chansonnier and orchestra (1996)

=== Chamber ensemble ===
- Suite for 2 pianos, wind instruments and percussion (1960)
- Trio gioco a tre for piano trio op.12 (1963)
- Bossa Nova op.21 (1968)
- An einen Haushalt
- Die wirkliche Wut über den verlorenen Groschen for 5 players (1972)
- Anagramm for 6 celli (1987)
- 3 Mob Stücke for 7 interchangeable instruments and percussion (1968; version for trumpet and orchestra arr. 1999)

=== Instrumental ===
- 4 Pieces for solo violin, op.11
- 6 Episoden (aus einer unterbrochenen Chronik) for piano, op.20 (1966–67)
- Bossa Nova for violin and piano, op.21e
- Luftschlösser (Castles in the Air) for piano (1981)
- Exposed Throat (solo trumpet)

== See also ==
- List of Austrians in music

== Sources ==
- Literature by and about Heinz Karl Gruber in the German National Library catalogue
- Tempo No.126 (September 1978) containing articles 'The Viennese MOB art & tone ART Group' by Josef Heinzelmann; 'HK Gruber: A formal introduction from Two Sides' by David Drew, '"Nali" Gruber: Private Impressions by a Friend' by Otto M. Zykan and HK Gruber, 'Music and Politics'.
- Bio at Boosey & Hawkes
