= Charivari (Gruber) =

Orchestral composition by HK Gruber

- ein österreichisches Journal für Orchester
- by HK Gruber
- English: Charivari, an Austrian Journal for Orchestra
- Composed: 7 December 1981: Vienna
- Dedication: Barrie Gavin
- Performed: 23 August 1983: London
- Published: 1982: London (Revised version 1988: London)
- Duration: 12 minutes

Charivari is a composition for orchestra by HK Gruber. It is based on a polka by Johann Strauss II, Perpetuum mobile, Op. 257. Charivari was completed in 1981.

== Composition ==
Charivari was initially thought as an orchestral showpiece based on the main motifs of the polka Perpetuum mobile by Johann Strauss II. Because of this strong association, even though it is not included in the score, the Strauss polka is always played attacca before Charivari, as the composition's first bars are very similar to the Perpetuum mobile's ending. For this reason, the composition is also sometimes known as Perpetuum mobile/Charivari. The composition has been subtitled "An Austrian Journal for Orchestra" (German: Ein österreichisches Journal für Orchester) by Gruber himself. According to the composer:

But during the course of composition I realised that there was another reason why the "perpetual motion" idea had been nagging my conscience. Strauss himself was already describing an endangered species. But from today's standpoint his motif alarmingly calls to mind that official mask of Gemütlichkeit behind which post-Habsburg Austria has so often hidden its reactions to even the most drastic changes of fortune, and its complicity with some of them.

— Heinz Karl Gruber, Composer's Note on Charivari

The composition is dedicated to Barrie Gavin and was finished in Vienna on 7 December 1981. It was premiered by the London Sinfonietta conducted by Simon Rattle at the Queen Elizabeth Hall, in London, on 23 August 1983. However, Gruber decided to make a revised version of the composition later that year. The revised version was premiered by the Vienna Philharmonic Orchestra, conducted by Ivan Fischer in Vienna, on 22 January 1984. The initial version was published by Boosey and Hawkes in 1981, and the revised version followed in 1984.

== Structure ==
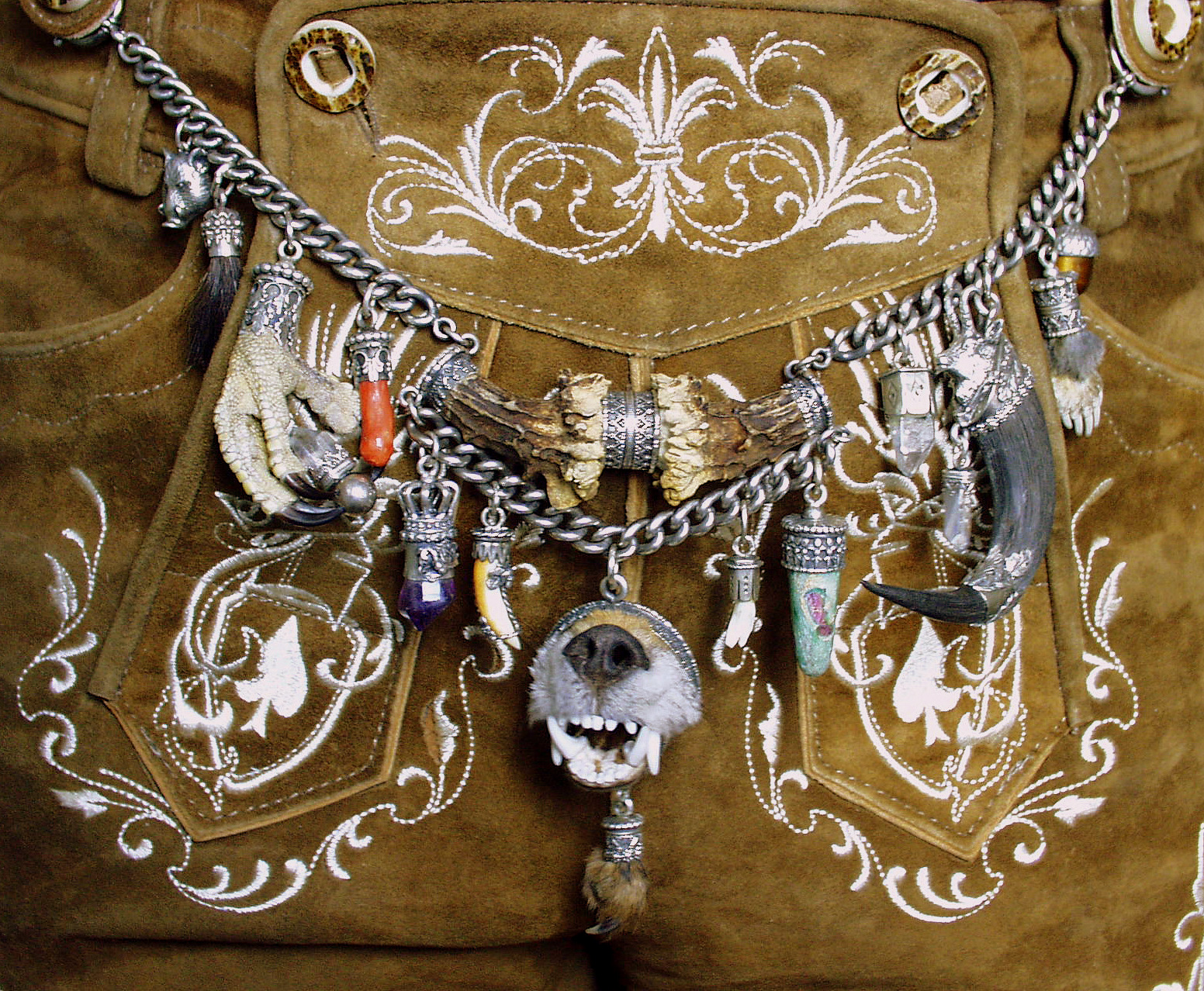
A Charivari, a silver chain with coins and hunters' trophies, worn in Bavaria and Austria with traditional costumes

The title of the composition plays with two meanings of the word "charivari": a garland-like traditional folk costume ornament used primarily in the Bavaria region called a charivari, and to noisy rough "cat" music (Katzenmusik). The composition is in one movement and takes 10 to 11 minutes to perform (12 minutes according to the publisher), even though it is generally played together with Strauss II's Perpetuum mobile, making it 14 minutes long. It is scored for a large orchestra, consisting of two flutes, two oboes, two clarinets in B-flat, two bassoons, two horns in F, two trumpets in C, two trombones, one tuba, timpani, a percussion section played by two to three percussionists, harp, and a large string section.

Various musical styles are played throughout the compositions, ranging from a typical fast polka, as referencing the composition which it is based on, to a waltz. Gruber begins with a lush Viennese orchestration recalling the late-Romantic musical idiom of Strauss and Gustav Mahler, but builds up to a crisis:

In Charivari the 'mask' is gradually allowed to slip, until, in the final crisis, it is torn off. Although the coda hastily restores it, and adds a fleeting reminder of Strauss's 'Wiener Blut', it no longer fulfils its concealing function. The uglier facts of history cannot always be glossed over; and except perhaps for the tourist trade there's nothing to be gained from obsessively harking back to the 'good old days'.

== Recordings ==
- The Tonkünstler Orchestra performed the piece with Kristjan Järvi for BIS Records. The recording was released in September 2006.
- The BBC Philharmonic, conducted by Gruber, recorded the piece for Chandos Records. The recording took place in the Studio 7 of the BBC Broadcasting House in Manchester and was released in 2007.
