= Nomination bracelet =

Charm bracelet made of interchangeable links

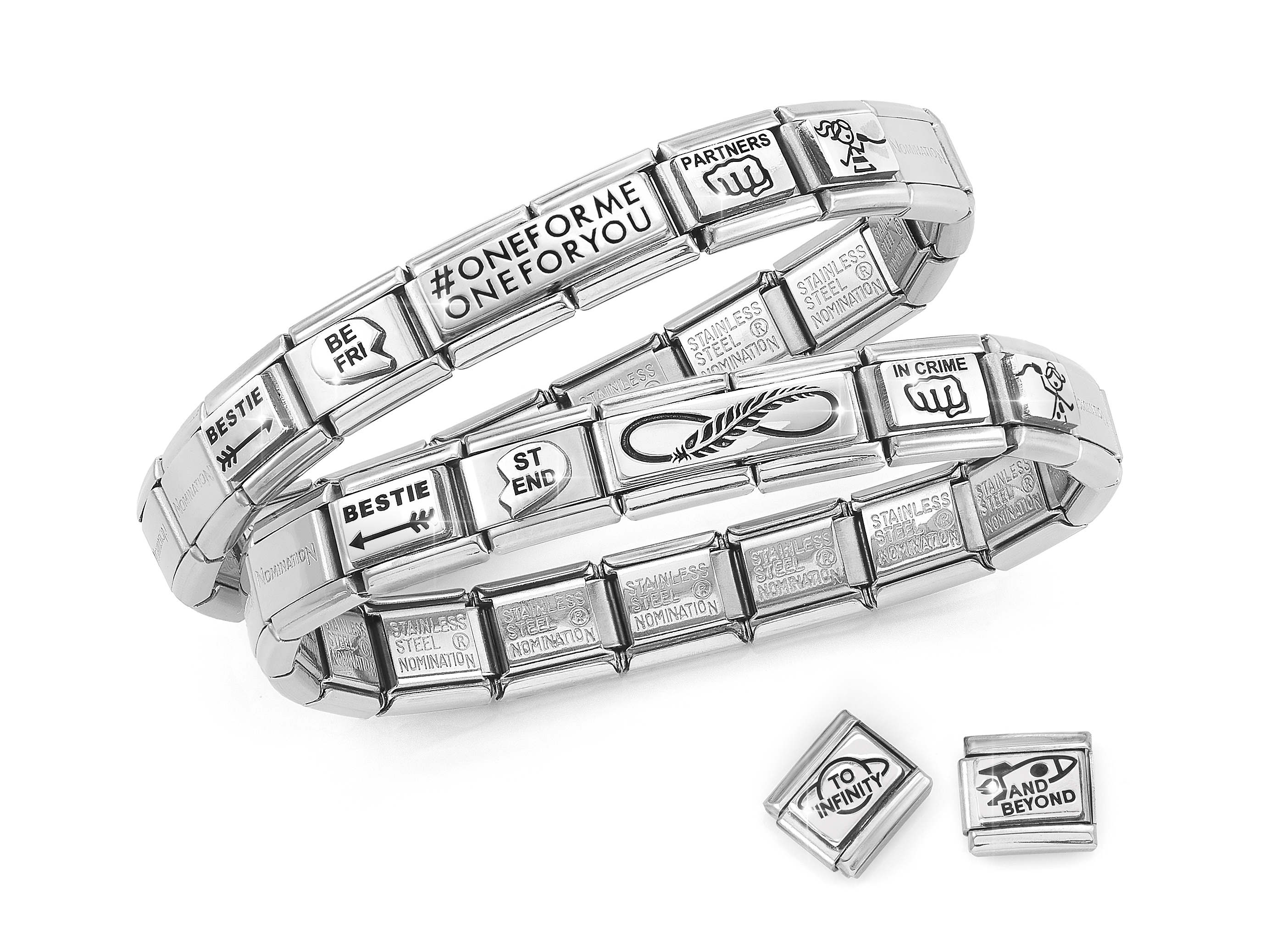
#oneforme series (Italian bracelet)

An Italian Charm bracelet, also known in the US as a charms bracelet, is a series of individual modular links hooked together on a stretchy band to form a single charm bracelet. A typical Italian charm bracelet comprises eighteen charm links. Each link features a charming face (design or image) soldered onto the actual charm link.

== Overview ==
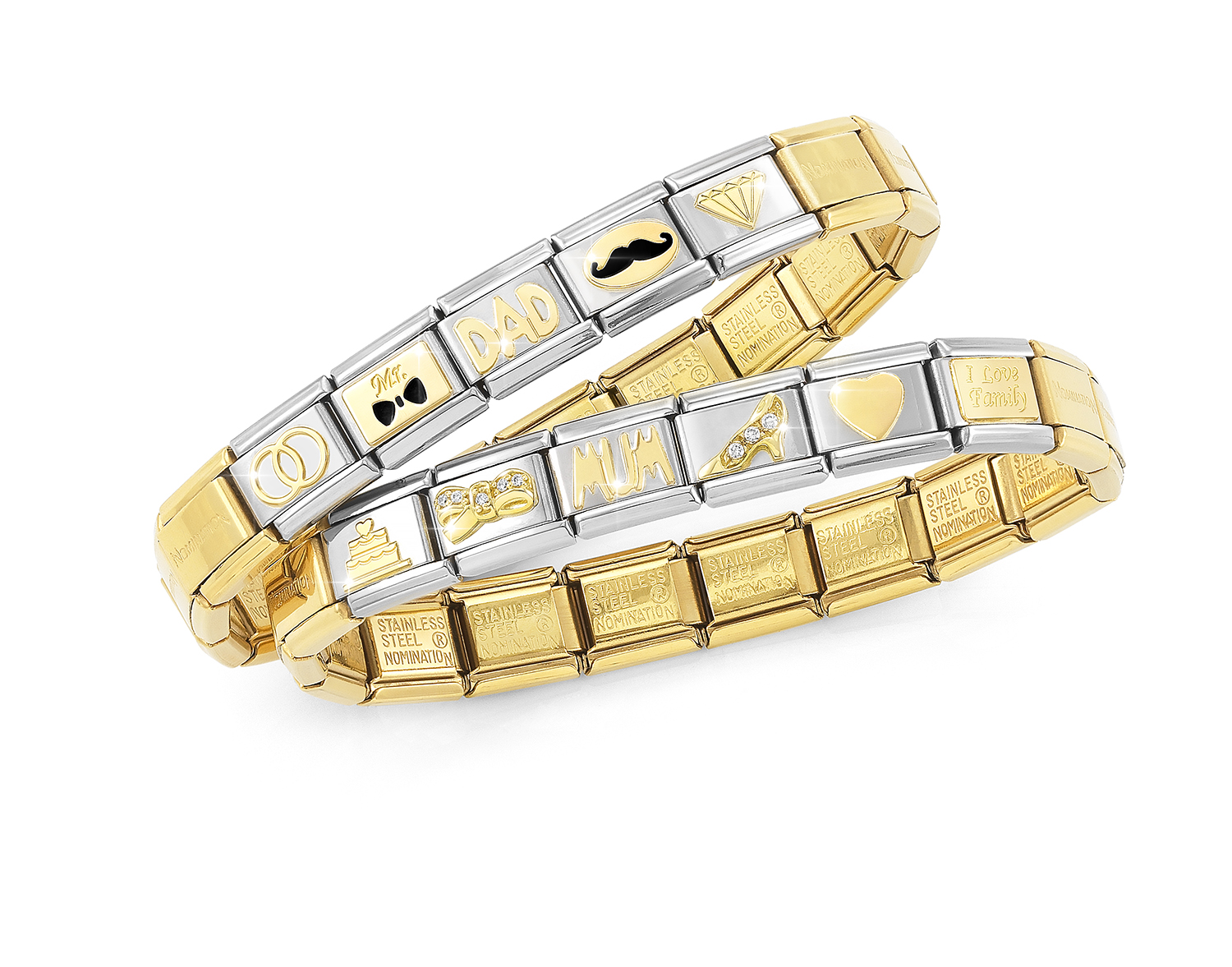
Nomination bracelet

In 1987, Nomination, an Italian jewelry company based in Sesto Fiorentino, Italy, introduced the Composable line, featuring modular bracelets made of stainless steel. It had later become known as the “Italian charm bracelets”. People could add links to update their bracelets with symbols that told the story of the important events, milestones, and achievements in their lives, as well as hobbies and goals.

In the 1990s, American tourists noticed the style and brought it to the United States and in the early ‘2000s, Italian charm bracelets became popularized in the US.

In 2019, the brand launched the "One for me, One for you" campaign, which aimed to show a connection among individuals, mirroring the interlocking links of Nomination bracelets. The brand's catalogue featured nearly 2,500 links.

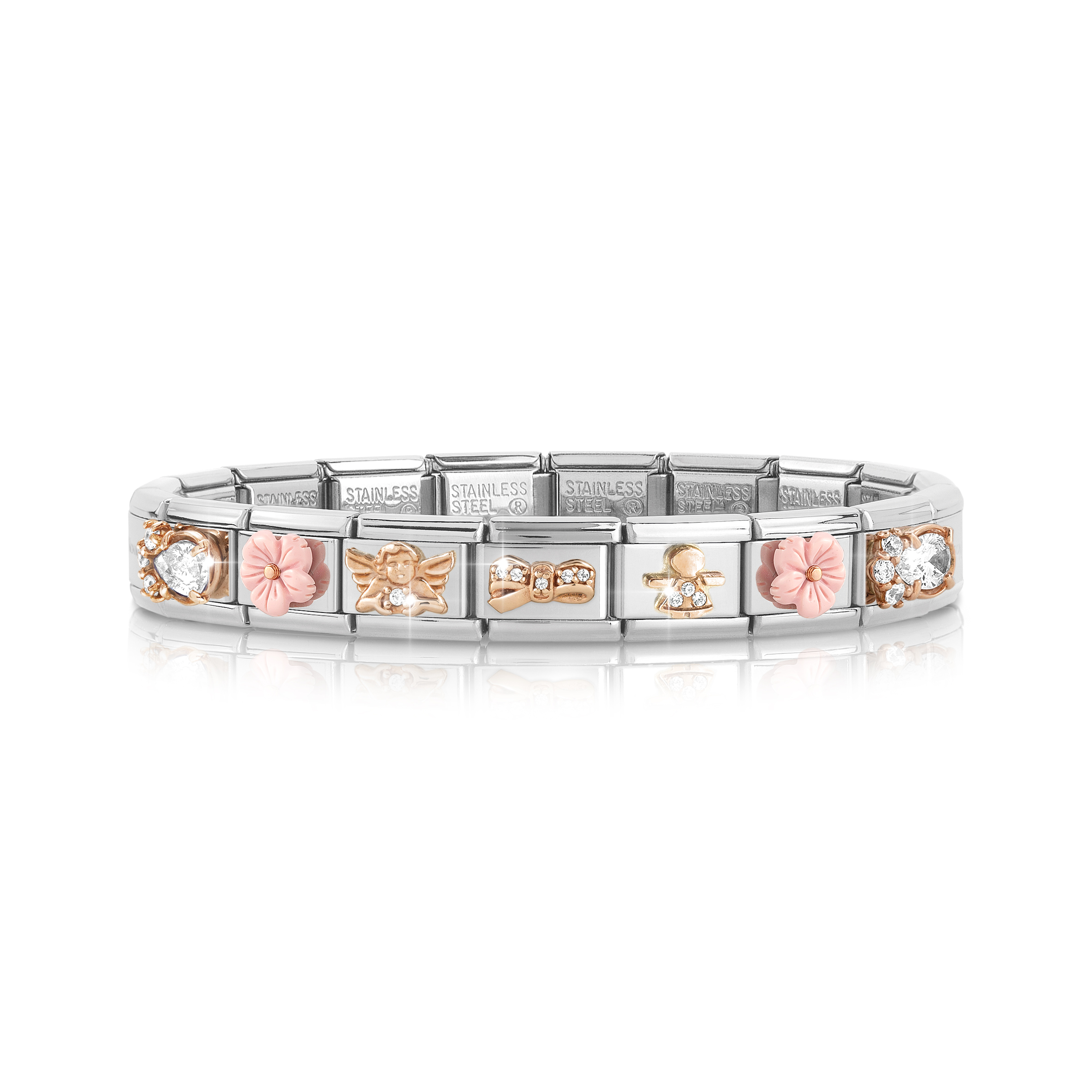
Composable nomination bracelet

In 2023, the resurgence of Italian charm bracelets is evident through their prominent presence on the wrist of "Love Island" Season 9 contestant Anna-May Robey and the trending tag on TikTok.

Nomination became known for its customizable bracelets made of interchangeable links. Each charm is separate yet interlocking, lying flat against the wrist like a stretch band.

The bracelets are usually made of lightweight stainless steel with 18k gold, 9k gold, 925 silver, precious and semi-precious stones, pearls, cubic zirconia, and diamonds. The original Nomination bracelets aimed primarily at young women, although the company also released models for men.
