= Charivari (store) =

Chain of clothing stores in New York City

- Company type: Private
- Industry: Clothes shop
- Founded: April 1, 1967; 58 years ago in New York City, New York, U.S.
- Founder: Selma Weiser
- Defunct: 1998
- Fate: Bankrupt
- Headquarters: New York City, New York, U.S.
- Key people: Selma Weiser (Founder); Barbara Weiser; Jon Weiser

Charivari was a chain of clothing stores in New York City. Its first store opened in 1967 and had grown to six stores before finally closing in 1998. It is known for championing avant-garde fashion designers in the 1980s. The name translates to "uproar" in French. Its rise to prominence in fashion coincided with the gentrification of its neighborhood, Manhattan's Upper West Side.

== History ==
The Charivari stores were founded by Jon Weiser, his mother Selma and his sister Barbara Weiser in 1967.

In 1976, the men's department relocated to its own store across the street. That year, Esquire magazine included Charivari in a feature on America's eight top stores. During the 1970s and 1980s the store grew from one to five locations (four on the Upper West Side and one on West 57th street). A sixth location on the Upper East Side was added in 1992. The Upper West Side locations were designed by Alan J. Buchsbaum.

Writing about the closing of the chain in The New Yorker, Rebecca Mead noted: "If, during the nineteen-eighties, you wanted your clothes to indicate that you were a) in the know, fashion wise; b) a bit of an intellectual; and c) not afraid of wearing unfinished seams or jackets turned inside out, or other things that might, if not worn with sufficient élan, look like fashion disasters, then you shopped at Charivari."

The founders attributed the company's decline and eventual failure to poor financial planning, the recession in the 1990s and its own success: the availability of the avant-garde designers championed by Charivari in both the designers' own stores and at larger department stores made a store like Charivari unnecessary.

The Charivari Detroit Musical Festival was named in tribute to the brand.

== Activities ==
The Charivari stores featured Japanese and European designer wear, including Azzedine Alaïa, Giorgio Armani, Ann Demeulemeester, Dolce & Gabbana, Perry Ellis, Jean Paul Gaultier, Katharine Hamnett, Marc Jacobs (who, as a teenager, worked at Charivari), Helmut Lang, Issey Miyake, Thierry Mugler, Dries van Noten, Prada, Gianni Versace, and Yohji Yamamoto.
