= Nomination (jewelry) =

Jewelry brand

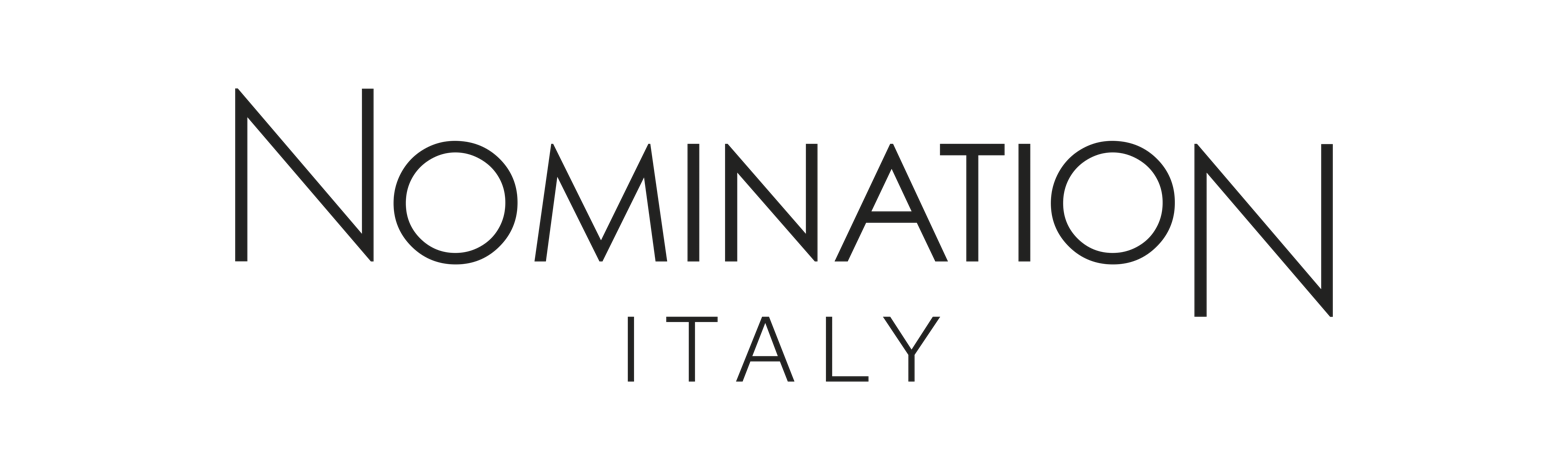
- Company type: Private
- Industry: Jewelry
- Founded: 1983
- Founder: Paolo Gensini
- Headquarters: Sesto Fiorentino, Italy
- Area served: Worldwide
- Products: Italian Charm Bracelet, watches
- Website: www.nomination.com/us_en/

Nomination is an Italian-based global jewelry brand, best known for its Italian Charm Bracelet or the Nomination bracelet.

== History ==
The brand was founded in 1983 with the first company name G4 by Paolo Gensini in Sesto Fiorentino, nearby Florence, Italy, a city with a centuries-old tradition of goldsmiths and jewelers. Working as an ice cream maker in youth, Paolo Gensini decided to create a customizable bracelet just like the flavors of an ice cream that everyone can choose something unique. In 1987, Paolo Gensini designed the Composable bracelet with gold letters and symbols named with the trademark Nomination that later in 2000s gave its name to the company itself, becoming a brand. each bracelet was personalizable with various themes, letters, numbers, symbols etc.

In the 90s, the bracelet was a huge success first in Italy, and then in the early 2000s in the North European countries and straight after the United States. Since the bracelet came from Italy, it was called the Italian Charm Bracelet or the Nomination bracelet. In the 2000s, Nomination named this collection Composable, to protect its brand. It is made of more than 3,000 links with various themes.

In 1996, the company opened the first monobrand store in Milan. In 2008, Nomination launched a new line of Silvershine Composable Collection.

In 2019, the brand launched the "One for you, one for me" campaign, which aimed to show a connection among individuals, mirroring the interlocking links of Nomination bracelets. The brand's catalogue featured nearly 2,500 links. At the same time, the company operated five thousand independent retailers and 50 singlebrand stores.

In 2023, the company launched its first flagship store in Cape Town at the V&A Waterfront.

The company launches every season a new Links design for the Composable bracelet and new complete jewelry collections. As of 2023, Nomination is sold in more than 40 countries through independent jewelry stores and in singlebrand stores in the main cities worldwide.

In 2019, The Intellectual Property Enterprise Court found UK retailer JSC liable for trademark infringement for selling links compatible with Nomination charm bracelets.
