= Foilbacks =

Jewelry technique

Foilbacks, in vintage jewellery, is the practice of inserting metal foil behind gemstones or faux gemstones, to enhance their sparkle and reflective properties. When this foil darkens or peels, these gemstones are often considered dead or lacking in sparkle. Modern jewelers seldom use foiling behind actual gemstones, but faux gems are made in a similar fashion even today.
