= Puzzle jewelry =

A piece of puzzle jewelry is a puzzle which can be worn by a person as jewelry.

These puzzles can be both fully mechanically functional and aesthetically pleasing as pieces of wearable jewelry.

== Examples of available puzzle jewelry ==
The following list implies that a small version of the cited puzzle is available with suitable design and finish to be worn as jewelry.

- Puzzle ring, often made in Turkey having four interconnected rings

== See also ==
- Puzzle box
