= Charivari (decorative chain) =

Piece of costume jewellery popular in the German state of Bavaria

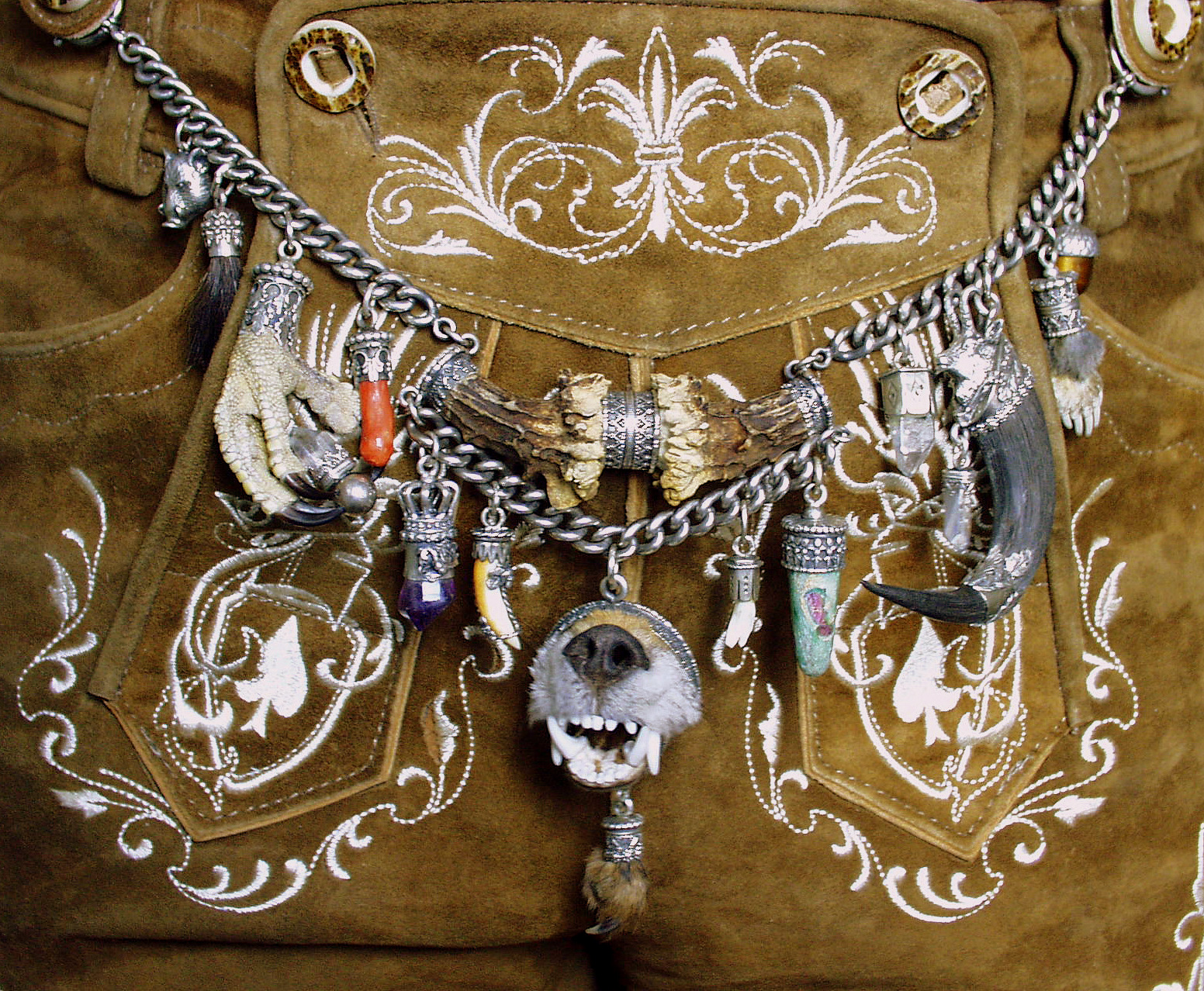
A "classic" hunting and dress charivari. With fox nose as the centre, semi-precious stones, raptor claw and "Schergraberl" (mole paw). Upper Bavaria, late 20th-century

Charivari (pronounced /ˌʃɑːrɪˈvɑːri/) is a piece of costume jewellery popular in the German state of Bavaria. Made of solid silver or silver-plated chain, it is decorated with gemstones, coins, medals, horn, and small body parts from a variety of animals.

== Origin and use ==
The name charivari derives from the Latin caribaria meaning "mess" or "madness". It also means "pandemonium" or "commotion". This meaning has continued in both English and French.

Bavarian men wear the charivari on the belt of their lederhosen. The charivari traditionally served as jewellery or as a talisman for a successful hunt. It likely developed from a watch chain, from which were hung with hunting trophies. It could not be bought, was carefully preserved and was passed down in a single family through the generations. Some old charivaris have values of up to 10,000 euros (about £8,770). The chain for women is usually finer, made of "Erbsketten" and decorated with talismen.

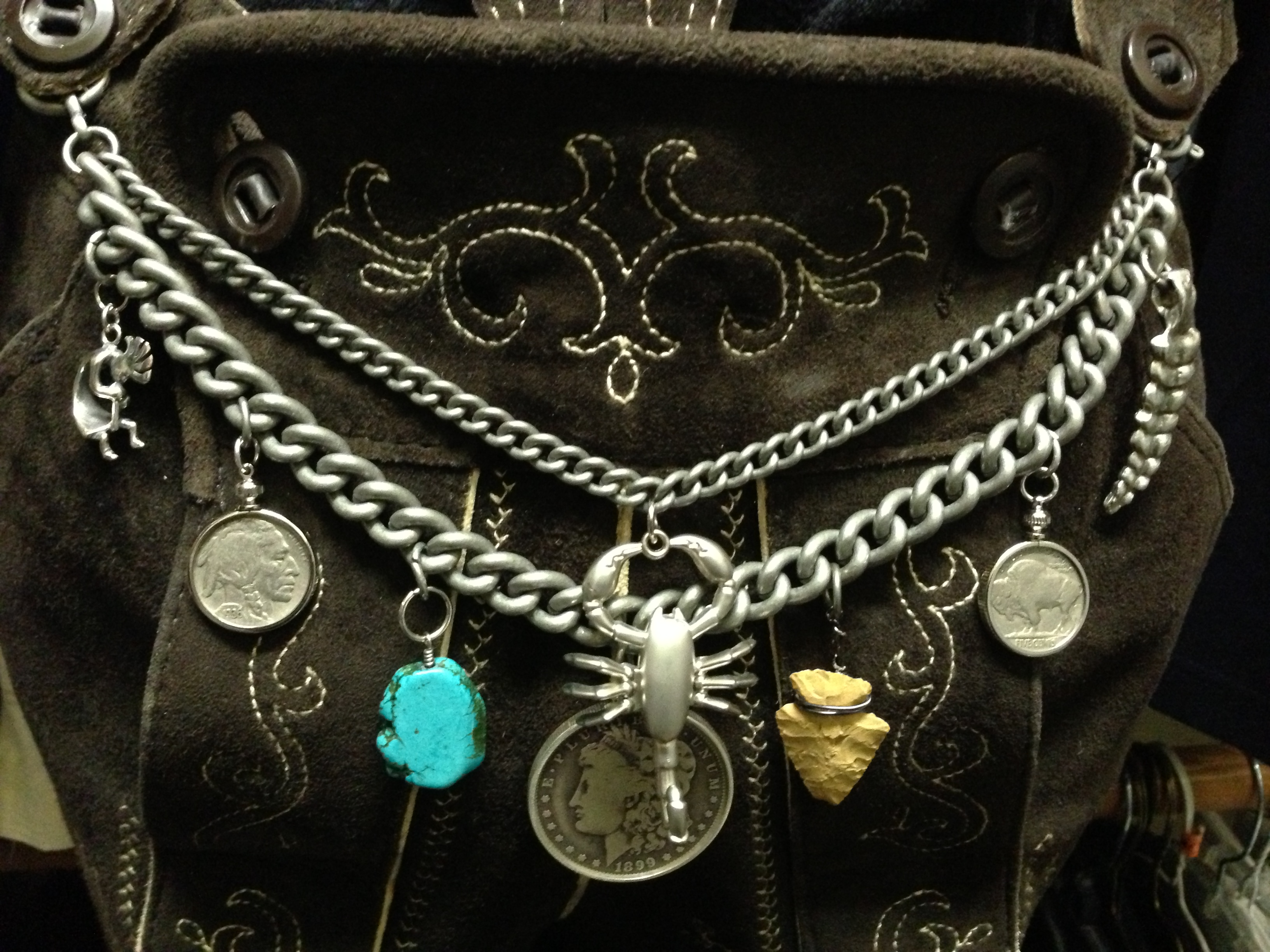
Charivari Arizona-style

== Gallery ==
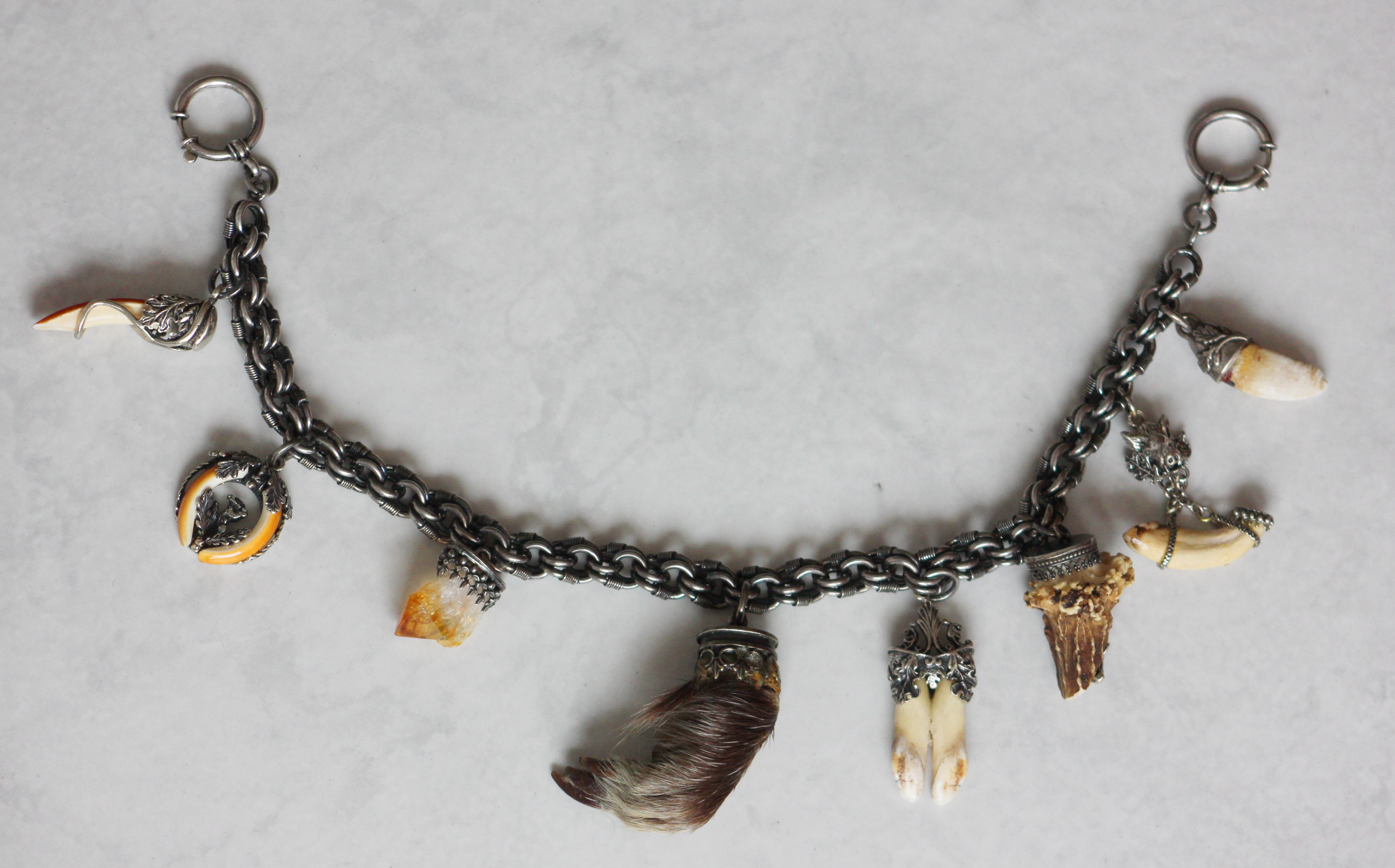
Traditional Charivari - silver chain with pendants

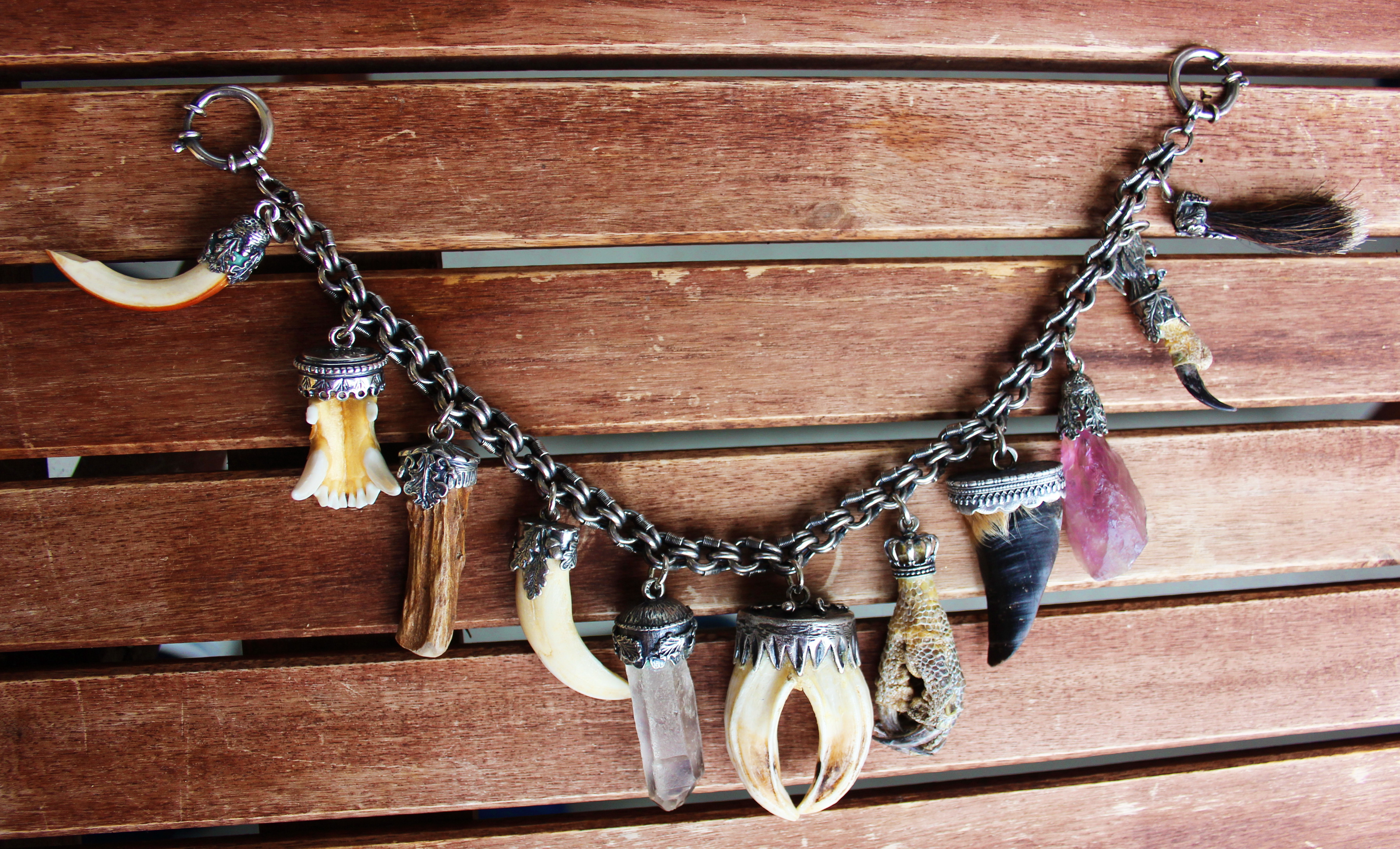
Charivari with many adornments

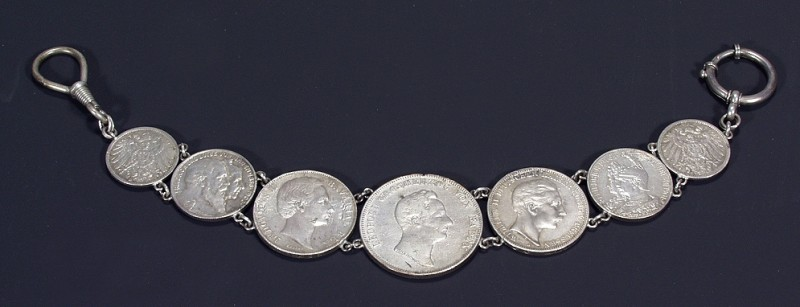
Charivari with silver coins from the 19th and early-20th century from Bavaria, Baden and Prussia, including a commemorative coin of King Ludwig II of Bavaria

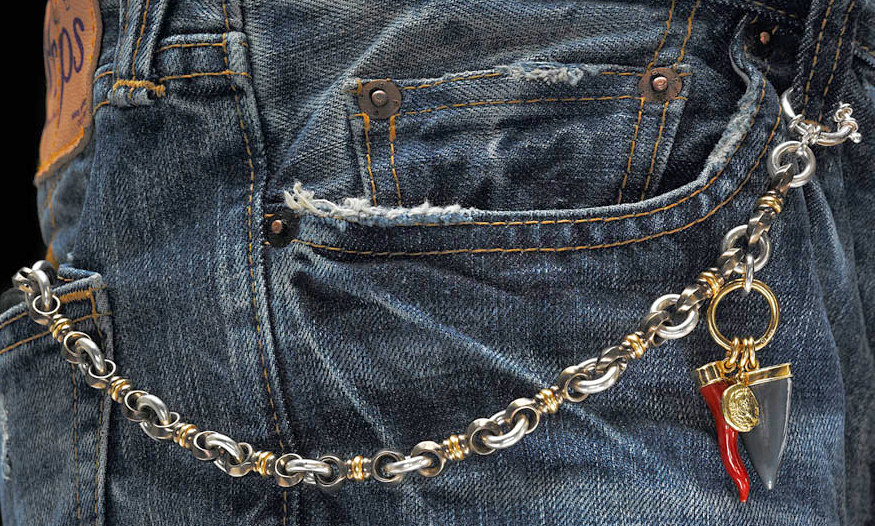
Modern charivari worn on jeans

== See also ==
- Charm bracelet
