= Wedding ring =

Finger ring which indicates that its wearer is married

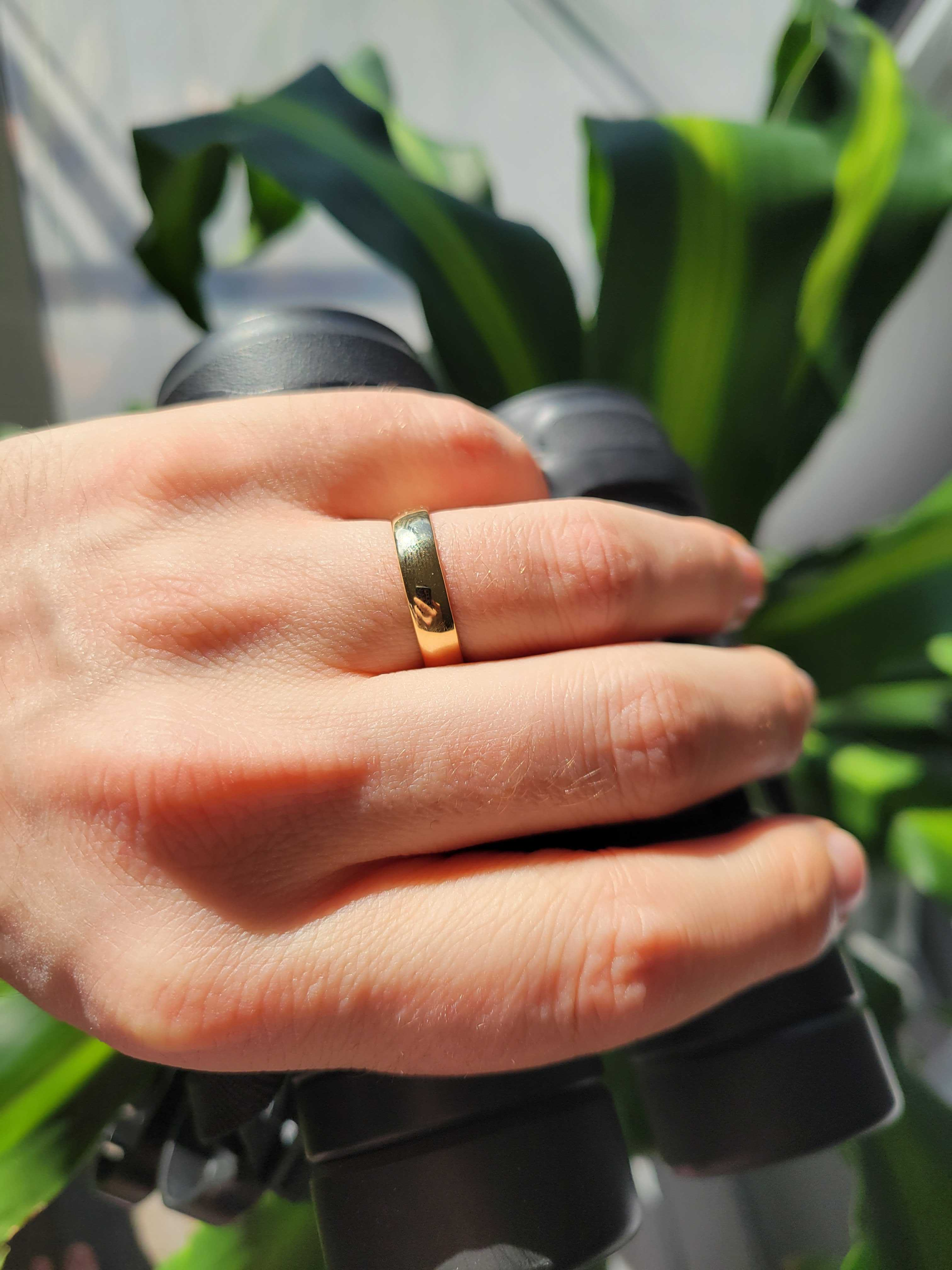
A traditional-style (plain) 18K gold wedding band.

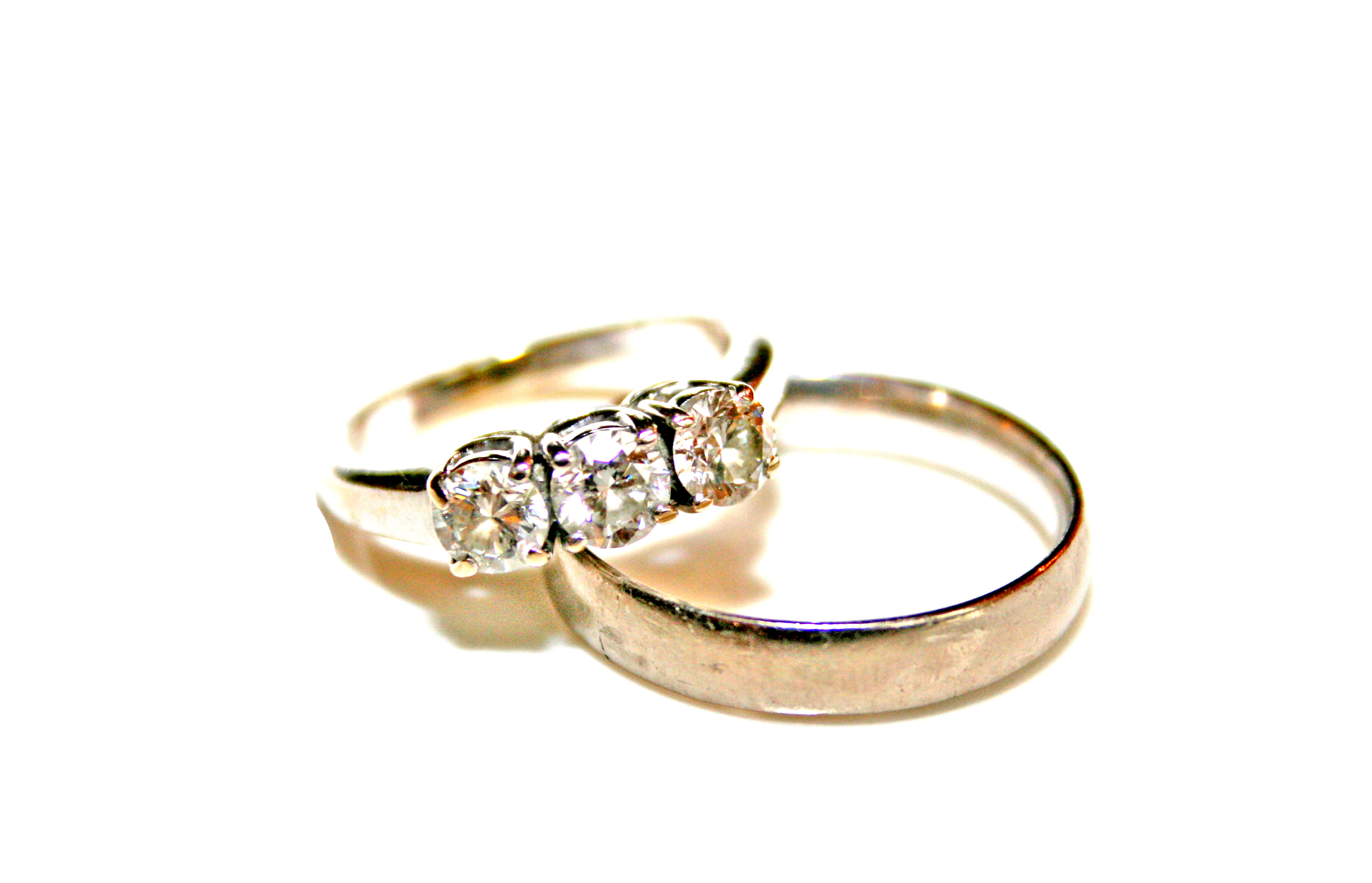
A pair of wedding rings

A wedding ring, also called a wedding band in the United States, is a finger ring that indicates that its wearer is married. It is usually forged from metal, traditionally gold or another precious metal. Rings were used in ancient Rome during marriage.

In western culture, a wedding ring is typically worn on the base of the ring finger of the left hand, following the tradition of the Book of Common Prayer (1662). The ring finger is widely said to be associated with the traditional belief known as vena amoris ("vein of love").

== History ==
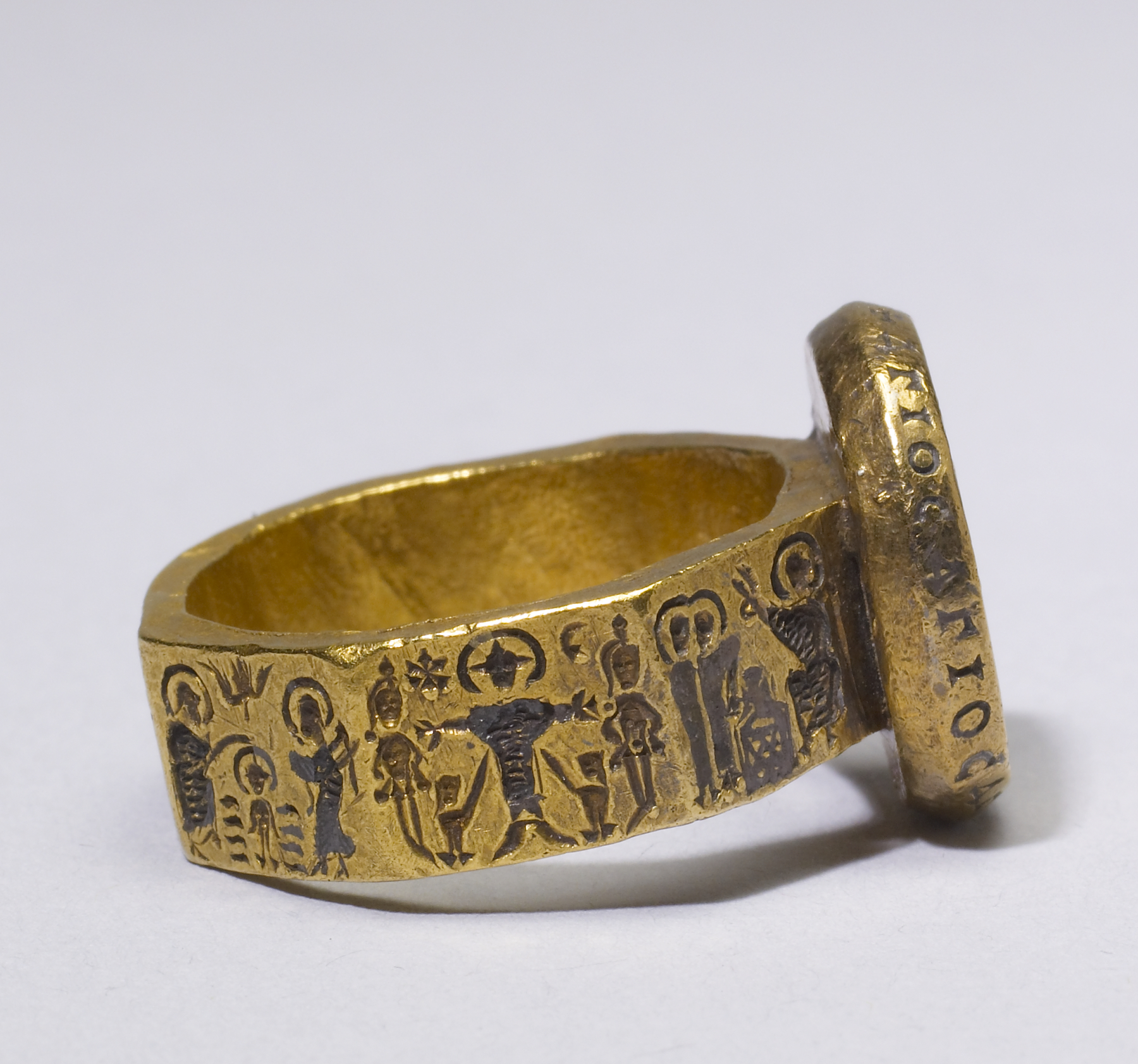
Marriage Ring with Scenes from the Life of Christ, c. 6th century, Walters Art Museum

The Western traditions of wedding rings can be traced to ancient Rome and Greece, and were first associated with the marital dowry and later with a promise of fidelity. The modern exchange of rings derived from the customs of Europe in the Middle Ages as part of Christendom.

=== Historical styles ===
==== Gimmel rings ====
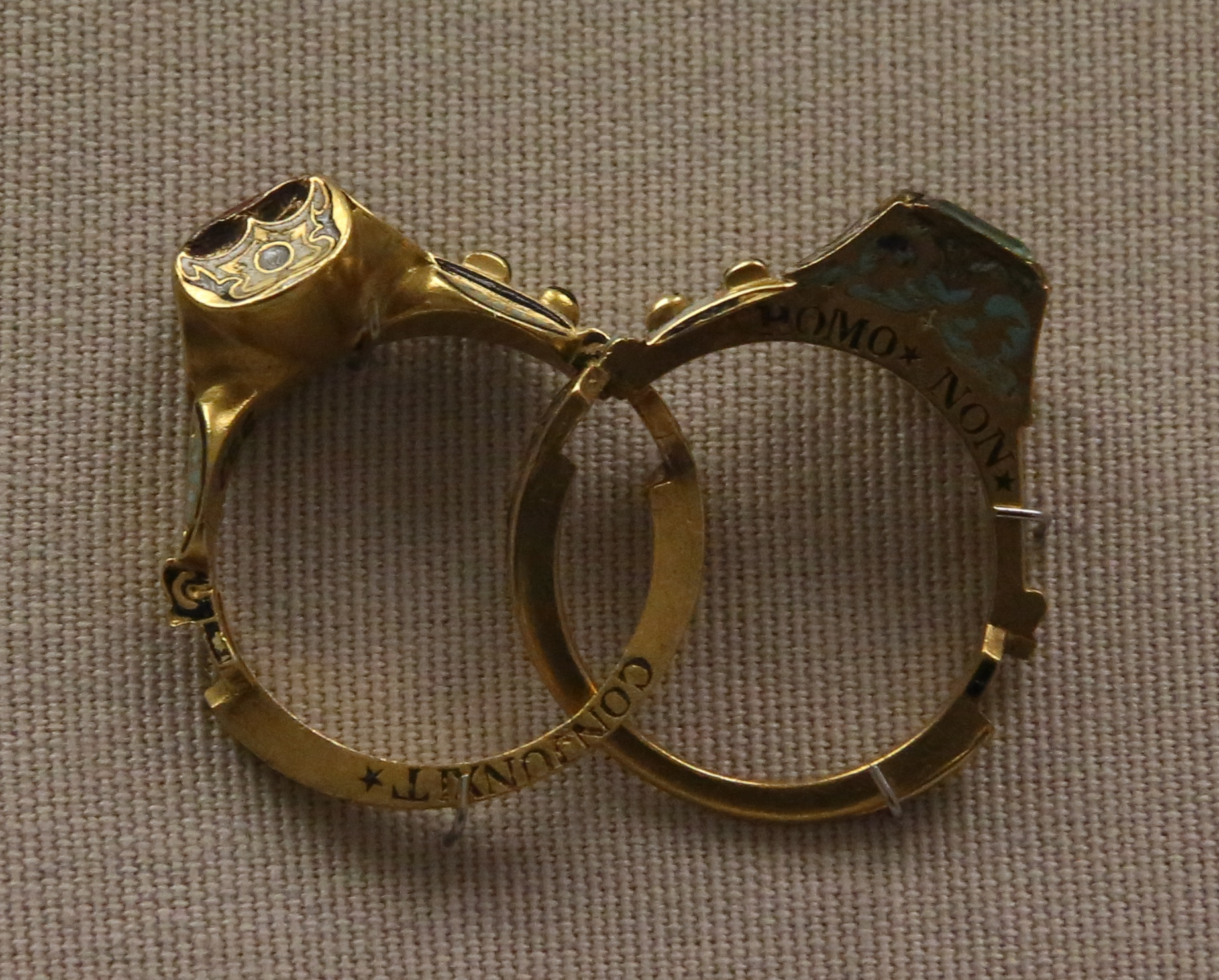
Gimmel ring with the hoop opened, in the British Museum

During the 16th and 17th centuries, European husbands bestowed a gimmel ring upon their wives. Similar to the puzzle ring, the gimmel ring consisted of two interlocking bands. The bride and groom both wore one of these bands after their engagement, and the two bands were reunited during the wedding ceremony. Subsequently, the wife wore the combined ring.

==== Poesy rings ====
The poesy ring was a style of ring that was popular during the Renaissance era. It was a band of sterling silver inscribed with a poem or "poesy".

==== Other styles ====
Different cultures used many other historical styles of wedding ring. According to popular legend, in the Middle East, a puzzle ring, consisting of many bands that interlock to create a finished ring, would be given by the husband as a wedding ring, because if the wife removed it (presumably to commit adultery), the bands of the ring would fall apart, and she would be unable to reassemble it before its absence would be noticed. However, a puzzle ring can be easily removed without the bands falling apart.

The fede ring, being a band consisting of two hands clasped in betrothal, is another historical custom of Europe that ostensibly dates from antiquity.

==== Limited gold content in the United Kingdom ====
In 1942 during the Second World War, British wartime restrictions on the manufacture of jewelry resulted in "utility" wedding rings that were limited to a maximum mass of two pennyweights, being slightly heavier than 3 grams (0.11 oz), and were forged of 9 carat gold rather than the traditional 22 carat. The Regional Assayer Office hallmarked these rings, which guaranteed their gold content and compliance with the wartime regulations with a special utility mark adjacent to the mark for the year on the inside of the band; the hallmark resembled a capital "U" with the bottom curve absent or two parentheses enclosing a space, i. e., "()".

=== Double-ring ceremony ===
The double-ring ceremony describes the exchange of wedding rings by and for both spouses. In several European nations such as the Nordic countries, it is common to exchange plain engagement rings of the same form for both sexes, and typically, an additional, more precious, and bejeweled wedding ring is given to the bride. In the nuptials, the groom's ring becomes a wedding ring also, and can be bestowed anew by the bride as a part of the wedding ceremony. The engagement is commonly a matter of agreement between the two, and the wedding rings are chosen together. Both engagement and wedding rings are worn on the left hand in Sweden and Finland, the bride having both rings together. Occasionally, the groom receives a separate wedding ring. In Germany and Austria, both parties use engagement rings worn on the left hand. At the nuptials, a wedding ring is placed on the right hand, as in several east European nations, including Bulgaria, Poland, and Russia. This can be a new ring for the bride or both, or reusing the engagement rings. Any engagement rings can then remain on the left hand or be transferred to the right hand. In Germany, it has been customary for both the bride and the groom to wear a wedding ring since at least the 1870s and mentions of couples exchanging rings during the wedding ceremony in the Netherlands can be found at least as far back as 1815. In both the United States and Canada, wedding rings were initially only worn by wives, but became customary for both spouses during the 20th century. In Brazil, Mexico, and Spain both sexes also wear engagement rings, and the groom's ring often becomes a wedding ring in the nuptial exchange ceremony. In The Netherlands plain bands can be worn on either hand, left for Catholics and right for Protestants. When engaged, both bride and groom wear what will be the wedding band on the opposite hand and switch hands after the wedding.

== Compositions and styles ==
In Western nations, wedding rings are often forged of gold, palladium, platinum, argentium silver, titanium, or tungsten. Common engravings on the inside of the ring include the name of one's spouse, the names of both spouses, the date of the wedding or a phrase of significance to the spouses. In many nations the engagement rings are plain while the bride's wedding ring commonly is bejeweled.

Some customs include the wedding ring as the final of a series of gifts, which also may include the engagement ring, traditionally given as a betrothal present. This custom was practiced in ancient Rome.

== Cultural practices ==
=== Wedding ceremony customs ===
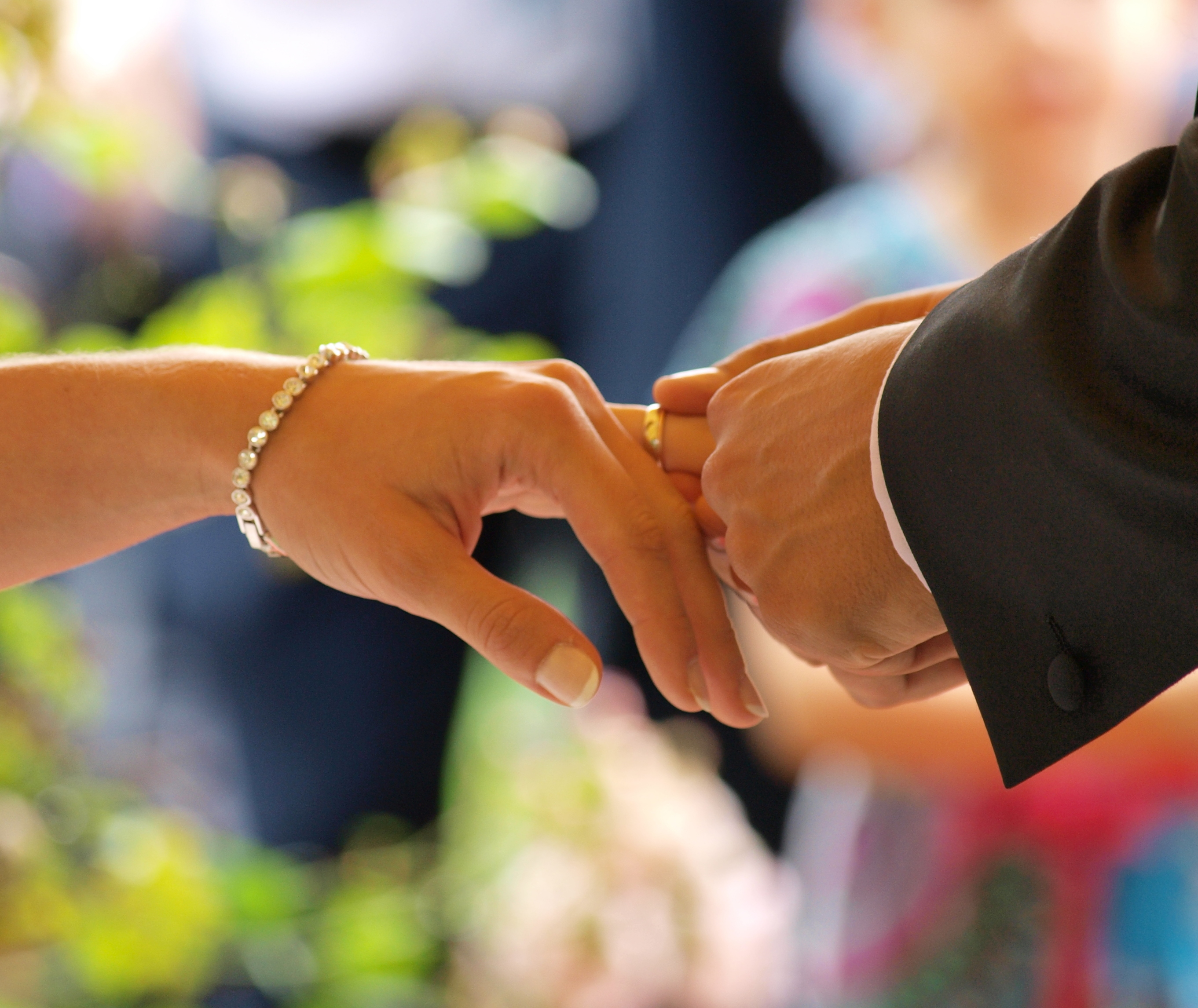
A groom placing a wedding ring on the finger of his bride during a wedding ceremony

In several traditions, the best man or maid of honor has the duty of keeping track of a couple's wedding rings and to produce them at the symbolic moment of the giving and receiving of the rings during the traditional marriage ceremony. In more elaborate weddings, a ring bearer (who is often part of the family of the bride or groom) may assist in the ceremonial parading of the rings into the ceremony, sometimes on a special cushion.

In Western Christianity, engagement rings are exchanged during the betrothal rite, while wedding rings are given during the celebration of holy matrimony itself. Among Eastern Orthodox, Eastern Lutheran and Eastern Catholic Christians, the exchange of rings is not technically part of the wedding service, but rather are exchanged at the betrothal. It is always a two-ring set given to her by the priest or by the best man. Unlike most other Orthodox Churches, the Eastern Orthodox Christian Church of Greece has recently stopped performing betrothal blessings separately, and now a betrothal ceremony is the initial part of the wedding service. In Greece, the ceremony of betrothal may be performed immediately before the wedding (or "crowning" as it is more properly called), and the actual symbolic act of marriage is not the exchange of rings, but the crowning.

Historically, the wedding ring was connected to the exchange of valuables at the moment of the wedding rather than a symbol of eternal love and devotion, a sign of "earnest money". According to the 1549 edition of the Book of Common Prayer: after the words "with this ring I thee wed" follow the words "This gold and silver I give thee", at which point the groom was supposed to hand a leather purse filled with gold and silver coins to the bride. It is a relic of the times when marriage was a contract between families, not individual lovers. Both families were then eager to ensure the economic safety of the young couple. Sometimes it went as far as being a conditional exchange as this old (and today outdated) German formula shows: "I give you this ring as a sign of the marriage which has been promised between us, provided your father gives with you a marriage portion of 1000 Reichsthalers" (approximately 20 kg (44 lb) of silver).

=== Post-wedding customs ===
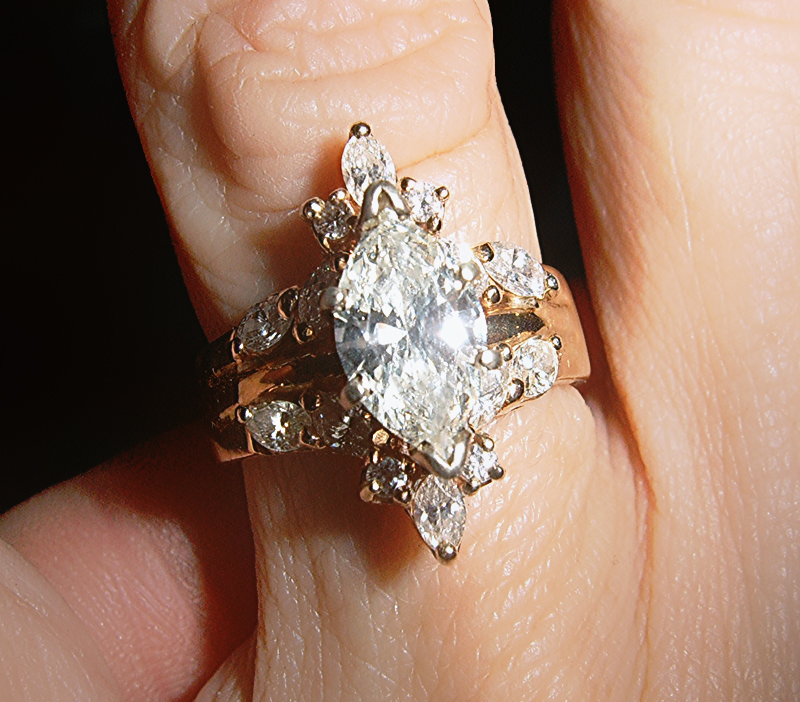
A gold banded engagement-wedding-anniversary ring combination welded together

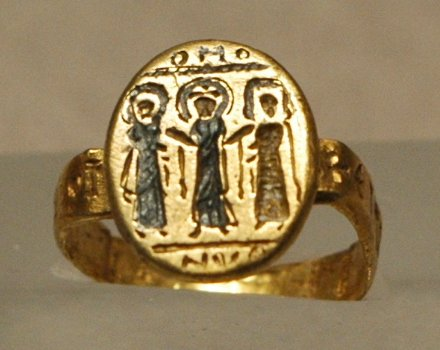
Byzantine wedding ring, depicting Christ uniting the bride and groom, 7th century, nielloed gold (Musée du Louvre)

After marriage, the wedding ring is worn on the hand on which it had been placed during the ceremony. By wearing rings on their fourth fingers, married spouses symbolically declare their life-long love for and fidelity to each other. This symbol has public utility and is presently expected as a matter of tradition and etiquette, so much so that its absence is often interpreted as meaning that the person is single. Many spouses wear their wedding rings day and night. It is not uncommon for some spouses, especially those who have occupations that make the wearing of rings dangerous, such as actors, police and electrical workers, to not wear the ring at all, or to wear it on a chain around their neck. Since the 19th century in the West, some have considered it unlucky to remove a wedding ring once it has been placed on the finger in church.

Some cultures exchange additional rings. In some parts of India, Hindu women may wear a toe ring or bichiya instead of a finger ring, but the bichiya is increasingly worn in addition to a finger ring. In eastern India, primarily in West Bengal, women wear an iron bangle, which may be gold- or silver-plated, called a loha. In Romania, spouses celebrate their silver wedding anniversary, i.e. twenty-fifth anniversary, by exchanging silver rings, which are worn on the fourth finger of the left hand along with their original, and usually gold, wedding rings.

=== Wedding ceremonies that use rings ===
==== Christian ====
- Anglican (Book of Common Prayer): "With this ring I thee wed, with my body I thee worship, and with all my worldly goods I thee endow: in the Name of the Father and of the Son and of the Holy Ghost. Amen."
- Eastern Orthodoxy: In the Eastern Orthodox Service of Betrothal, the priest makes the Sign of the Cross with rings over the bride's head while declaring three times "The servant of God (Groom) is betrothed to the handmaid of God (Bride), in the Name of the Father, and of the Son, and of the Holy Spirit. Amen". Next, it is declared three times again over the bride's head with the names reversed, after which the rings are exchanged three times, either by the priest or best man. The priest asks God "to bless this putting on of rings with a heavenly blessing and that an Angel of the Lord will go before these Your servants, all the days of their life." In the Eastern Orthodox Church, wedding rings are traditionally worn on the right hand.
- Lutheran: "I give you this ring as a sign of my love and faithfulness."
- Roman Catholic Church: "[Name], receive this ring as a sign of my love and fidelity. In the name of the Father, and of the Son, and of the Holy Spirit." Because the equality of the spouses is emphasized in the Roman Catholic Sacrament of Marriage, generally the bride and groom each give to the other a wedding ring and recite the above formula in turn.

===== Mixed usage and non-use in other Christian Churches =====
While most Christian Churches (such as the Catholic, Lutheran, and Anglican) have the exchange of rings within their wedding liturgies, some Christian denominations eschew the use of wedding rings.

The wearing of plain dress has historically been practiced by many Methodist Churches, in keeping with the teaching of John Wesley, who stated that people should not be "adorned with gold, or pearls, or costly apparel" (this clause is contained in The General Rules of the Methodist Church). The first Methodist liturgical text, The Sunday Service of the Methodists, omitted the ring ceremony. As such, members of some Methodist Churches, such as the Allegheny Wesleyan Methodist Connection and Bible Methodist Connection of Churches, do not wear wedding rings. However, other Methodist Churches contain the exchange of wedding rings within their services for Holy Matrimony. In the wedding liturgy for the Free Methodist Church, for example, the groom and bride say the following when exchanging rings: "This ring I give you in token and pledge of our constant faith and steadfast love". "A Service of Christian Marriage, Rite I" contained in The United Methodist Book of Worship states that the exchange of rings is optional but when it is done, they are blessed and pronounced as "the outward and visible sign of an inward and spiritual grace, signifying to us the union between Jesus Christ and His Church". Following this, the bride and groom state the following as they exchange rings: "[Name], I give you this ring as a sign of my vow, and with all that I am, and all that I have, I honor you; in the name of the Father, and of the Son, and of the Holy Spirit."

A Conservative Anabaptist catechism 1001 Questions and Answers on the Christian Life notes that "money which is spent today for adornment and for jewelry" would "buy food for the needy, clothes for the naked, and Bibles for the heathen." As such, a number of Conservative Mennonite groups do not wear jewelry, including wedding rings, as part of their practice of plain dress.

Among Quaker Christians, especially Conservative Friends and Holiness Friends, the wedding ring is traditionally not worn as a part of their testimony of simplicity. Among Quaker groups that do wear wedding rings, the following wording is used by the bride and groom as they are exchanged: "With this ring, I thee wed." The Friends General Conference, for example, teaches that "Although wedding rings are not necessary in a Quaker wedding, the couple may exchange them if they wish. This is often done after they speak their vows."

Traditionally, adherents of the Seventh-day Adventist Church do not wear wedding rings. The usage of wedding rings among Seventh-day Adventists, however, has increased.

==== Jewish ====
- Judaism: "You are consecrated to me with this ring according to the law of Moses and Israel." In Orthodox Judaism, only the groom declares this in Hebrew; but in Reform Judaism, both the bride and groom declare it. Many Orthodox Jewish men do not wear wedding rings.

== See also ==
- Claddagh ring
- Courtship
- Engagement ring
- Eternity ring
- Use of a wedding ring as a symbol: La bottega dell'orefice, a 1989 film based on The Jeweler's Shop, a play written by Karol Józef Wojtyła
- Pre-engagement ring
- Trilogy ring
- Visual markers of marital status
- The marriage symbol ⚭ depicts two engaged rings
- Divorce ring
