= Ecksand Jewelry =

Jewelry company

Ecksand
- Type: Private
- Industry: Jewellery
- Founded: 2009
- Founders: Erica Bianchini; Yoan Gehant-Vidoni
- Headquarters: Montreal, Quebec, Canada
- Products: Engagement rings, wedding bands, fine jewellery
- Website: ecksand.com

Ecksand is a Canadian jewellery company headquartered in Montreal, Quebec. The company designs and manufactures engagement rings, wedding bands, and other fine jewellery in its Montreal workshop, and operates boutiques in Montreal and Toronto.

== History ==
Ecksand was founded in 2009 by Erica Bianchini and Yoan Gehant-Vidoni. The company initially focused on jewellery incorporating naturally coloured diamonds, and was reported in 2013 to be the only Canadian member of the Natural Color Diamond Association.

In 2018, the company relocated its Montreal showroom to a street-level space connected to its production studio.

In 2021, Radio-Canada reported that the company received orders from international customers after Meghan, Duchess of Sussex wore one of its rings.

In February 2025, Ecksand opened a boutique in Toronto's Yorkville district, its second retail location. In November 2025, the company stated it was planning a future location in SoHo, Manhattan.

== Operations ==
Ecksand manufactures its jewellery in Montreal, where design, prototyping, stone setting, and finishing are carried out in-house. The company uses recycled precious metals and ethically sourced gemstones.

In 2025, Ecksand was granted the Canadian National Mark, a designation regulated under Canada's Precious Metals Marking Act indicating that precious-metal articles are manufactured in Canada to national standards. Fewer than 110 such certificates have been issued.
