= Fede ring =

Jewelry item

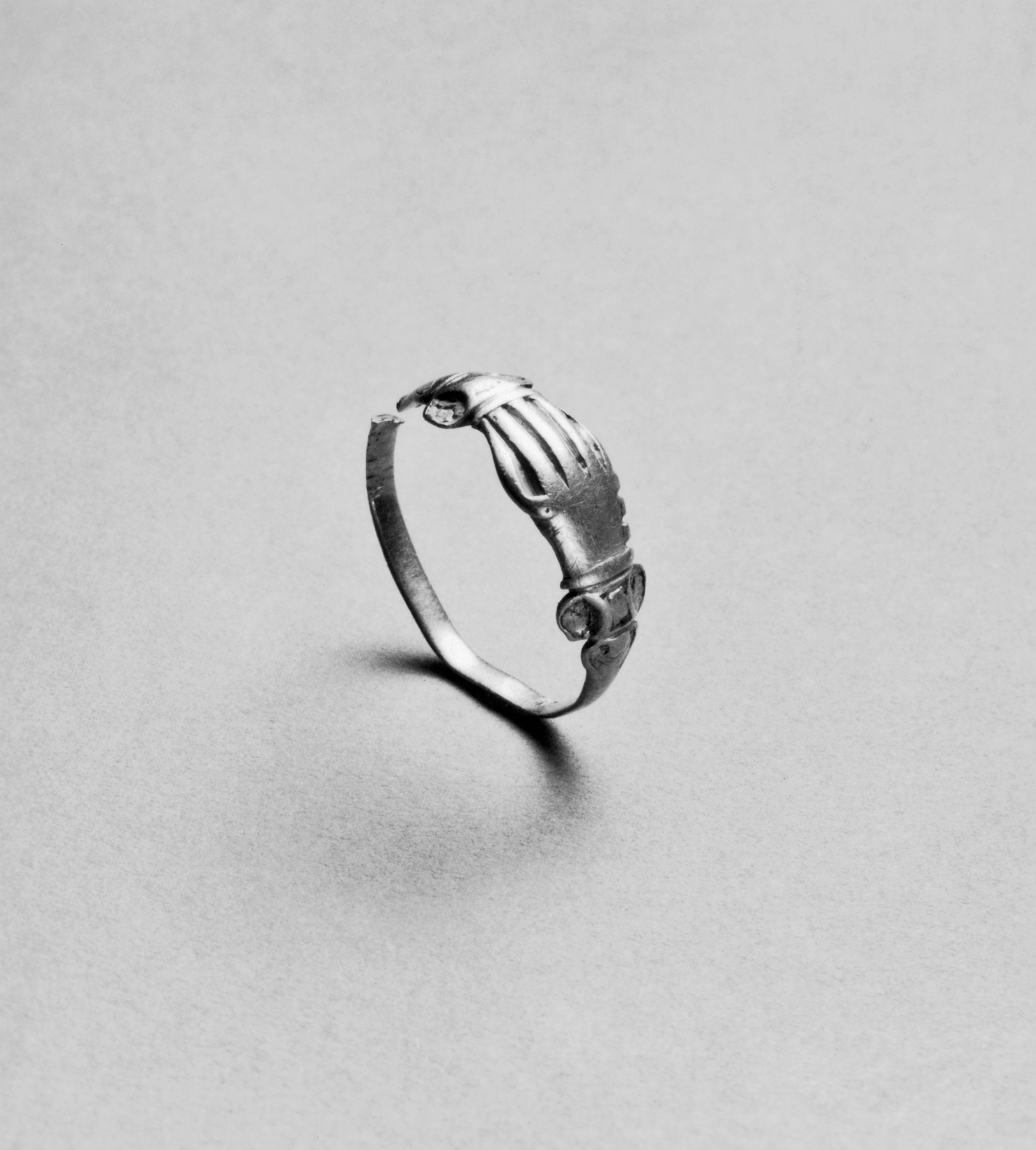
Renaissance-era fede ring (c. 1500–1650) at the Walters Art Museum

A fede ring is a ring in which two hands clasp, as in friendship, love or betrothal. The design was used in Ancient Rome and possibly earlier, becoming prominent from the 12th century onward. The word fede is from the Italian phrase mani in fede (lit. 'hands [clasped] in faith').

== History ==
The fede ring, having originated in Rome, did not get its name until its Middle Ages reappearance where it mirrored the tradition of handfasting and signified matrimony. In other instances, the ring had been given as a symbol of unending faithfulness or platonic love. Fede rings would also be designed with two bands that the couple could wear up to the day of marriage [where they would unite the bands into one whole ring].

== See also ==
- Claddagh ring
- Puzzle ring
- Gimmal ring
