= Ring enhancer =

Ring enhancers, also called ring guards, ring wraps, or curved rings are uniquely designed rings, created to be worn with solitaire diamond rings. The sole purpose of a ring enhancer is to complement a diamond solitaire ring with additional diamonds or gemstones, in order to enhance the size and appearance of a solitaire engagement ring. When worn together, the two rings appear to be a single, multi-stone ring.

== Types of diamond-ring enhancers ==
Popular styles of ring enhancers include wrap rings and insert rings. A Ring Wrap is a single band, contoured to fit around a solitaire diamond ring, displaying additional diamonds on both sides of the center stone. This type of enhancer literally wraps around the solitaire diamond, without completely encircling the center stone. An insert ring is usually a split, double band which provides a gap between the two bands for the diamond solitaire ring to slide into. With this style of enhancer, accent stones frequently completely encircle the center stone.

== Function of a Ring Wrap ==
Wrap rings can serve several purposes. They can be used in addition to a wedding band or can be used as the wedding band itself, creating a coordinated wedding ring set. Wrap rings are sometimes chosen as anniversary gifts or used when renewing wedding vows. In some instances, enhancers have been chosen to wrap around an heirloom solitaire diamond ring, such as a mother's engagement ring. Generally, these rings are used simply to enhance the appearance of a basic, diamond solitaire ring.
