= Engagement ring =

Jewelry ring

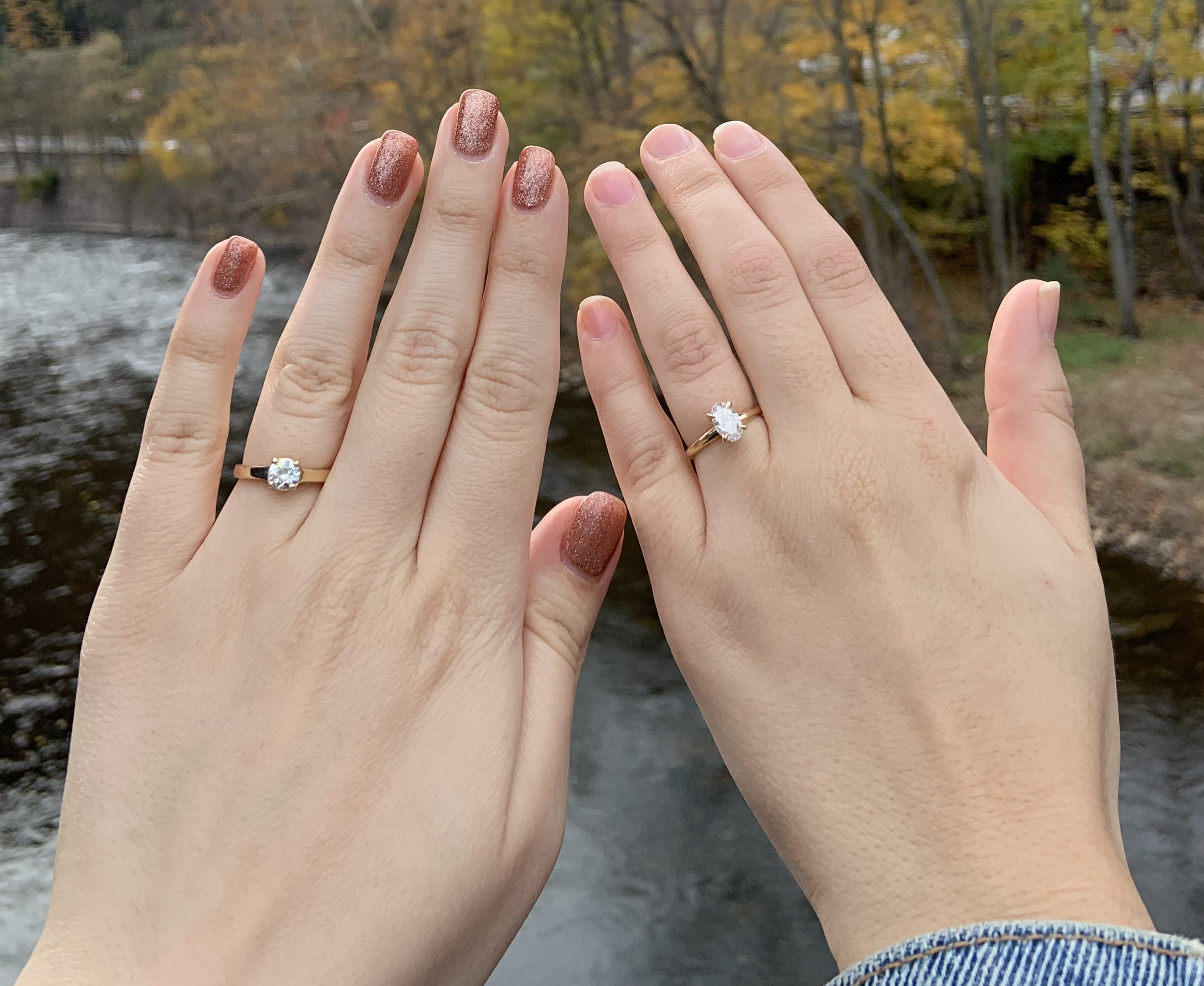
Two engagement rings, as traditionally worn on the ring finger of the left hand

An engagement ring, also known as a betrothal ring, is a ring indicating that the person wearing it is engaged to be married, especially in Western cultures. A ring is presented as an engagement gift by a partner to their prospective spouse when they propose marriage to represent a formal agreement to future marriage. In most Western countries, engagement rings are usually worn only by women, and they are typically adorned with diamonds. In some countries, partners wear matching rings, and engagement rings may also be used as wedding rings. In the Anglosphere, the ring is customarily worn on the left hand ring finger, but customs vary across the world.

Engagement rings have been common in Western countries since at least the time of the Roman Empire. They began to feature diamonds during the Renaissance, and became especially closely associated with diamonds after a marketing campaign by the De Beers Group between 1939 and 1979.

In some Christian traditions, engagement rings may be blessed and then worn during a betrothal ceremony of a couple, but neither the engagement ring nor any other ring is worn at the time when the wedding ring is put by the groom on the finger of the bride as part of the marriage ceremony, and sometimes by the bride onto the groom's finger. After the wedding, the engagement ring is sometimes put back on and is usually worn on the outside of the wedding ring.

== History ==
=== Ancient times ===
Although the ancient Egyptians are sometimes credited with inventing the engagement ring, and the ancient Greeks with adopting the tradition, the history of the engagement ring can only be reliably traced as far back as ancient Rome.

In many countries, engagement rings are placed on the ring finger of the left hand. At one time it was believed that this finger contained a vein (the vena amoris) that led to the heart. This idea was popularized by Henry Swinburne in A treatise of Spousals, or Matrimonial Contracts (1686). The story seems to have its origin in the ancient Roman book Attic Nights by Aulus Gellius quoting Apion's Aegyptiacorum, where the alleged vein was originally a nervus (a word that can be translated either as "nerve" or "sinew").

The popular belief that an engagement ring was originally part of the bride price which represented purchase and ownership of the bride, has been called into question by contemporary scholarship.

In the second century BC, the Roman bride-to-be was given two rings, a gold one which she wore in public, and one made of iron which she wore at home while attending to household duties. At one time Roman citizens wore rings made of iron. In later years senators who served as ambassadors were given gold seal rings for official use when abroad. Later the privilege of wearing gold rings was extended to other public officials, then to the knights, later to all freeborn, and finally under Justinian, to freedmen. For several centuries it was the custom for Romans to wear iron rings at home, gold rings in public. During this period a girl or woman might receive two engagement rings, one of iron and one of gold.

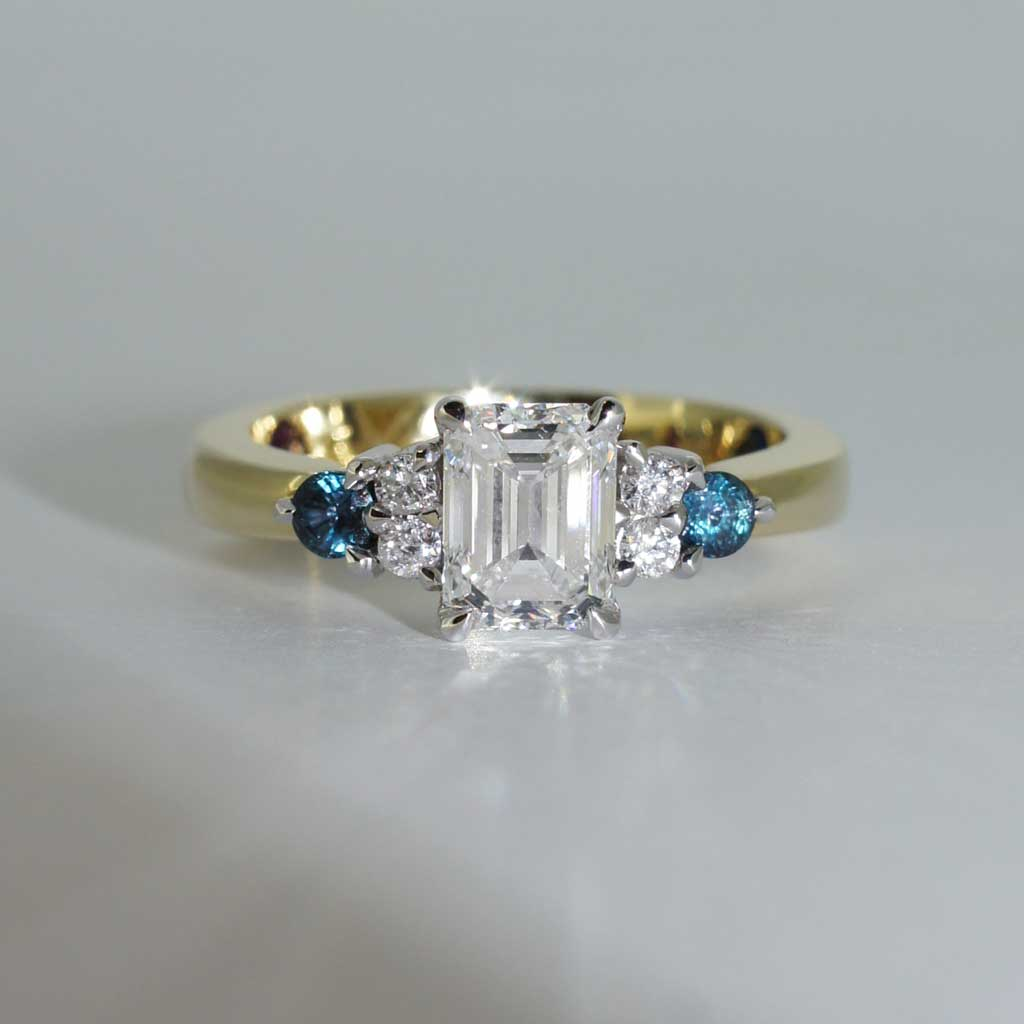
An engagement ring

=== Middle Ages ===
The mid-7th century Visigothic Code required "that when the ceremony of betrothal has been performed ... and the ring shall have been given or accepted as a pledge, although nothing may have been committed to writing, the promise shall, under no circumstances, be broken."

In 860 AD, Pope Nicholas I wrote a letter to Boris I of Bulgaria in reply to questions regarding differences between Roman Catholic and Eastern Orthodox practices. Pope Nicholas describes how in the Western church the man gives his betrothed an engagement ring. At the Fourth Council of the Lateran in 1215, convoked by Pope Innocent III, the banns of marriage was instituted, prohibiting clandestine marriages and requiring that marriages be made public in advance. Some legal scholars have seen in this a parallel with the engagement-ring tradition described by Pope Nicholas I.

=== Renaissance ===
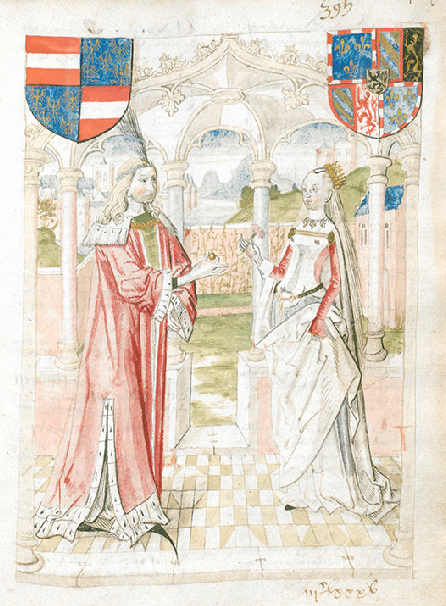
Maximilian offers an engagement ring to Mary of Burgundy. Miniature in a medieval manuscript copy of the Excellent Chronicle of Flanders by Anthonis de Roovere. Ca. 1485-1515. (Bruges Public Library Ms. 437)

The first well-documented use of a diamond ring to signify engagement was by the Archduke Maximilian of Austria in the imperial court of Vienna in 1477, upon his betrothal to Mary of Burgundy. This then influenced those of higher social class and of significant wealth to give diamond rings to their loved ones.

=== Reformation ===
During the Protestant Reformation the wedding ring replaced the betrothal ring as the primary ring associated with marriage. In Catholic countries the transition took place somewhat later.

=== Enlightenment ===
During the Age of Enlightenment both the gimmal rings and posie rings were popular, although the latter was more often used as an expression of sentiment than to indicate a formal engagement.

=== Victorian era ===
In South Africa, diamonds were first found in 1866, although they were not identified as such until 1867. By 1872, the output of the diamond mines exceeded one million carats per year. As production increased, those of lesser means were able to join in on this movement. However, diamond engagement rings were for a long time seen as the domain of the nobility and aristocracy, and tradition often favoured simpler engagement bands.

In 1852, the Koh-i-Noor diamond was re-cut and embellished in Queen Victoria's crown. This triggered a diamond rush throughout the world.

=== 20th century ===
In the United States, the popularity of diamond engagement rings declined after World War I, even more so than after the onset of the Great Depression.

In 1938, the diamond cartel De Beers began a marketing campaign that would have a major impact on engagement rings. During the Great Depression of the 1930s, the price of diamonds collapsed. At the same time, market research indicated that engagement rings were going out of style with the younger generation. Before World War II, only 10% of American engagement rings contained a diamond. While the first phase of the marketing campaign consisted of market research, the advertising phase began in 1939. One of the first elements of this campaign was to educate the public about the 4 Cs (cut, carats, color, and clarity). In 1947 the slogan "a diamond is forever" was introduced. Ultimately, the De Beers campaign sought to persuade the consumer that an engagement ring is indispensable, and that a diamond is the only acceptable stone for an engagement ring. The sales of diamonds in the United States rose from $23 million to $2.1 billion between 1939 and 1979.

Law professor Margaret F. Brining links the surge in engagement ring sales in the USA after 1945 to the abolishment of the "breach of promise", that had entitled a woman whose fiancé had broken off their engagement to sue him for damages. This rule of law was especially important for many women who had been sexually intimate with the fiancé, but were socially expected to be virgins in a new marriage, therefore lost "market value". After the gradual abolishment of that law action in all states the expensive engagement ring rose to popularity as a new financial security in case of a break-up, since it was custom for the women to keep the ring (partly only under the condition that the break-up was not seen as her fault).

=== 21st century ===
In the early 21st century, the jewellery industry started marketing engagement rings for men under the name "mangagement rings".

== Industry ==
In the 20th century, if he could afford it, the typical Western groom privately selected and purchased an engagement ring, which he then presented to his desired bride when he proposed marriage. In countries where both partners wear engagement rings, matching rings may be selected and purchased together. In the United States and Canada, where only women traditionally wear engagement rings, women also occasionally present their partners with an engagement gift.

Like all jewellery, the price for an engagement ring varies considerably depending on the materials used: the design of the ring, whether it includes a gemstone, the value of any gemstone, and the seller. The price of the gemstones, if any, in the ring depends on the type and quality of the gem. Diamonds have a standardized description that values them according to their carat weight, color, clarity, and cut. Other gemstones, such as sapphires, rubies, and emeralds have different systems. The jewellery may be chosen to honor a family tradition, to use family heirlooms, to have an unusual style, to have socially responsible characteristics (e.g., a style that is not associated with blood diamond controversy or the pollution caused by gold mining and cyanide process), to fit the individual's stylistic preferences, or to manage cost. Synthetic diamonds and diamond substitutes such as cubic zirconias and moissanites are also popular choices that are socially responsible and reduce cost while maintaining the desired appearance.

The idea that a man should spend a significant fraction of his annual income for an engagement ring originated from De Beers marketing materials in the mid-20th century in an effort to increase the sale of diamonds. In the 1930s, they suggested that a man should spend the equivalent of one month's income in the engagement ring. In the 1980s, they suggested that he should spend two months' income on it (three months in Japan). In 2012, the average cost of an engagement ring in the US as reported by the industry was US$4,000. In a 2015 scholarly study, almost a quarter of couples said that they did not buy a ring, and another third spent less than US$2000 on it. Less than 15% of couples spent $4,000 or more. In the UK, estimates of the average cost of an engagement ring range from £1200 to £2000. Scholarly research indicates that expensive engagement rings are associated with early divorces, possibly because spending more than US$2,000 on an engagement ring is strongly associated with debt-related stress. Couples that spend less money on engagement rings and the wedding ceremony tend to have longer marriages and a lower risk of divorce.

One reason for the increased popularity of expensive engagement rings is its relationship to human sexuality and the woman's marriage prospects. In the United States, until the Great Depression, a man who broke off a marriage engagement could be sued for breach of promise. Monetary damages included actual expenses incurred in preparing for the wedding, plus damages for emotional distress and loss of other marriage prospects. Damages were greatly increased if the woman had engaged in sexual intercourse with her fiancé. Beginning in 1935, these laws were repealed or limited. However, the social and financial cost of a broken engagement was no less: marriage was the only financially sound option for most women, and if she was no longer a virgin, her prospects for a suitable future marriage were greatly decreased. The diamond engagement ring thus became a source of financial security for the woman.

The online purchase of engagement rings is growing, disrupting the market for the diamonds by bringing greater transparency to an industry that has traditionally relied on opacity. Online diamond retailers and e-commerce platforms include Blue Nile, Brilliant Earth, and Costco.

=== Styles ===
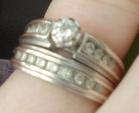
This wedding set contains two separate rings, either of which could be worn separately.

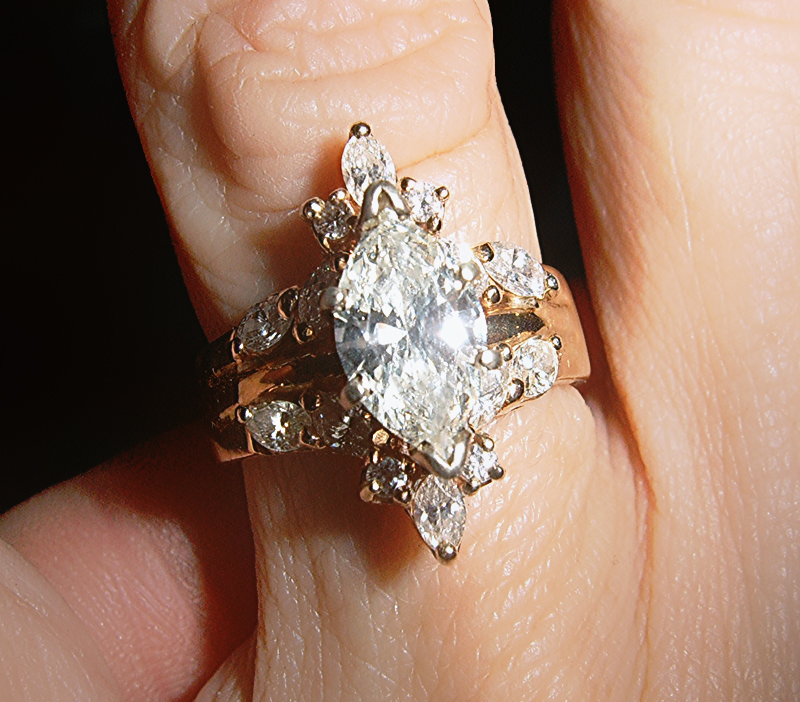
This wedding set contains two separate rings that look incomplete separately.

Engagement rings, like any other kind of jewellery, come in many different styles.

Gold (available in yellow gold, white gold and rose gold) and platinum are preferred for engagement rings, but common metal types such as titanium, silver, and stainless steel are also used for engagement rings. This allows for the spouse-to-be to exert their own individual style into the ring in a simple manner.

In the United States, where engagement rings are typically worn by women, diamonds have been widely featured in engagement rings since the middle of the 20th century. Solitaire rings have one diamond. The most common setting for engagement rings is the solitaire prong setting, which was popularized by Tiffany & Co. in 1886 and its six-claw prong setting design sold under the "Tiffany setting" trademark. The modern favorite cut for an engagement ring is the brilliant cut, which provides the maximum amount of sparkle to the gemstone. The traditional engagement rings may have different prong settings and bands. Another major category is engagement rings with side stones. Rings with a larger diamond set in the middle and smaller diamonds on the side fit under this category. Three-stone diamond engagement rings, sometimes called trinity rings or trilogy rings, are rings with three matching diamonds set horizontally in a row with the bigger stone placed in the center. The three diamonds on the ring are typically said to represent the couple's past, present, and future, but other people give religious significance to the arrangement.

A wedding set, or bridal set, includes an engagement ring and a wedding band that matches and can be bought as a set. In some cases, the wedding ring looks incomplete; it is only when the two halves, engagement and wedding, are assembled that the ring looks whole. In other cases, a wedding set consists of two rings that match stylistically and are worn stacked, although either piece would look appropriate as a separate ring. Although the wedding band is not to be worn until the wedding day, the two rings are usually sold together as a wedding set. After the wedding, the spouse may choose to have the two pieces welded together, to increase convenience and reduce the likelihood of losing one of the rings. A trio ring set includes a women's engagement ring, a women's wedding band, and a men's wedding band. These sets often have matching rings and are lower in price.

In Nordic countries, engagement rings are worn by both men and women. Traditionally they are plain gold bands, although more ornate designs and other materials are gaining popularity. In the United States, engagement rings typically feature a dominant center stone, while wedding bands are usually simpler rings or bands of small stones exchanged during the ceremony. The two are distinct pieces often worn together.

In North America and the United Kingdom, it is customarily worn on the left hand ring finger. Similar traditions purportedly date to classical times, dating back from an early usage reportedly referring to the fourth finger of the left hand as containing the vena amoris or "vein of love". This custom may have its origins in an ancient Egyptian myth that the finger contained a vein leading directly to the heart, or it may simply be because the heart lies slightly to the left side of the body. In Germany the ring is worn on the left hand while engaged, but moved to the right hand when married. In Poland and Turkey, the engagement ring and wedding band are traditionally worn on the right hand but modern practice varies considerably.

=== Legal ownership ===
Summary of engagement ring restitution laws by jurisdiction

Giver can take back the ring if the wedding does not occur regardless who breaks the engagement:

- United States: Arizona, California, Connecticut, Georgia, Illinois, Indiana, Iowa, Kansas, Louisiana, Maryland, Massachusetts (since 2024), Michigan, Minnesota, Mississippi, Nebraska, New Jersey, New Mexico, North Carolina, Ohio, Oklahoma, Pennsylvania, South Carolina, South Dakota, Tennessee, Virginia, West Virginia, Wisconsin
- Europe: France, Germany, Iceland, Spain, Lithuania, Switzerland, Italy, Romania
- Canada: British Columbia, Alberta
- Barbados
- South America: Mexico, Peru, Brazil
- Taiwan

Giver can take back the ring if the recipient breaks the engagement:

- United States: Alabama, Alaska, Colorado, Kentucky, Maine, Missouri, New Hampshire, Texas

Giver can take back the ring if the recipient breaks the engagement or it is ended by mutual consent:

- United States: Delaware, Florida, Washington
- South Africa
- Europe: Latvia, Austria
- Canada: Saskatchewan, Nova Scotia
- Australia: Western Australia, South Australia, Queensland
- Asia: Japan

Receiver keeps the ring depending on the relationship's length:

- New Zealand: If the ring was received after more than three years of relationship the receiver can keep the ring regardless of fault.

Receiver keeps the ring:

- United States: Montana
- United Kingdom: Northern Ireland, England and Wales
- Hong Kong

Unclear:

- Australia: New South Wales (Supreme Court used fault-based approach while Magistrate Court used unconditional gift approach)
- Canada: Ontario (some courts have used fault-based approach while some treated the ring as unconditional gift)
- United States: Arkansas, District of Columbia, Hawaii, Idaho, Nevada, North Dakota, Oregon, Rhode Island, Utah, Vermont, Wyoming
- Poland

Tradition generally holds that if the betrothal fails because the man himself breaks off the engagement, the woman is not obliged to return the ring. This reflects the ring's role as a form of compensation for the woman's damaged reputation. Legally, this condition can be subject to either a modified or a strict fault rule. Under the former, the fiancé can demand the return of the ring unless he breaks the engagement. Under the latter, the fiancé is entitled to the return unless his actions caused the breakup of the relationship, the same as the traditional approach. However, a no-fault rule is being advanced in some jurisdictions, under which the fiancé is always entitled to the return of the ring. The ring only becomes the property of the woman when marriage occurs. An unconditional gift approach is another possibility, wherein the ring is always treated as a gift, to be kept by the fiancée whether or not the relationship progresses to marriage. Recent court rulings have determined that the date in which the ring was offered can determine the condition of the gift. E.g. Valentine's Day and Christmas are widely recognized as gift-giving holidays in the United States and some other countries. A ring offered in the form of a Christmas present is likely to remain the personal property of the recipient in the event of a breakup.

In most states of the United States, engagement rings are considered "conditional gifts" under the legal rules of property. This is an exception to the general rule that gifts cannot be revoked once properly given. See, for example, the case of Meyer v. Mitnick, 625 N.W.2d 136 (Michigan, 2001), whose ruling found the following reasoning persuasive: "the so-called 'modern trend' holds that because an engagement ring is an inherently conditional gift, once the engagement has been broken, the ring should be returned to the donor. Thus, the question of who broke the engagement and why, or who was 'at fault,' is irrelevant. This is the no-fault line of cases." Though in certain states, whether a judicial action can be maintained at all to require return of an engagement ring is blocked by statute, as many states have statutes which state that no civil action shall be maintained for breach of promise to marry. A 2024 Massachusetts ruling adopting no-fault return (overturning a 1959 ruling) cited the adoption of no-fault divorce by the state legislature as a sign that this was the modern expectation.

One case in New South Wales, Australia ended in the man suing his former fiancée because she threw the ring away, after he told her she could keep it even though the marriage plans had fallen through. The Supreme Court of New South Wales held that, despite what the man said, the ring remained a conditional gift (partly because his saying that she could keep it reflected his desire to salvage the relationship) and she was ordered to pay him its A$15,250 cost.

In England and Wales, the gift of an engagement ring is presumed to be an absolute gift to the fiancée. This presumption may be rebutted however by proving that the ring was given on condition (express or implied) that it must be returned if the marriage did not take place, for whatever reason. This was decided in the case Jacobs v Davis (1917).

== See also ==
- Claddagh ring, a traditional Irish ring, often given or worn as a wedding ring
- Dearest ring, a ring with stones creating the acronym D E A R E S T
- Regards ring, a ring with stones creating the acronym R E G A R D S
- Gimmal ring, a multi-part engagement ring fashionable in Europe during the 16th and 17th centuries
- Pre-engagement ring
- Puzzle ring, sometimes called a "Turkish wedding ring"
- Ring enhancers, a ring that combines with a solitaire diamond ring to add gemstones
- Tension ring, a modern mount
- Divorce ring
