= Trilogy ring =

Ring set with a cluster of three stones

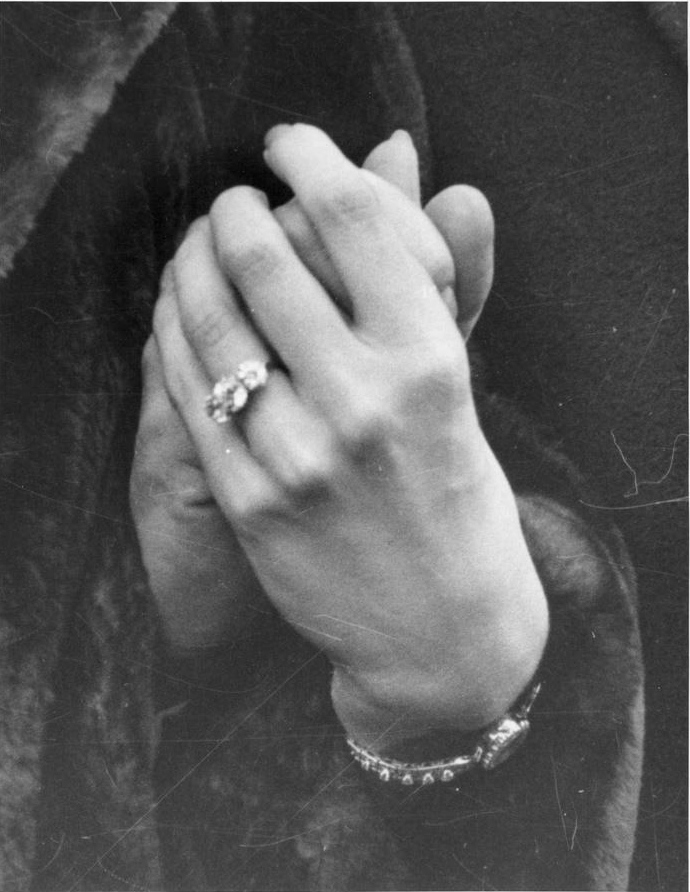
Princess Margaretha's engagement ring, a trilogy ring

A trilogy ring is a ring with a cluster of three stones set along the hoop. The center stone is often larger, or set higher than the two other stones, which are identical. The three stones symbolize the past, present (center stone), and future. These rings are often given as engagement rings, but can be used for other purposes, such as eternity rings.
