= Eternity ring =

Jewelry

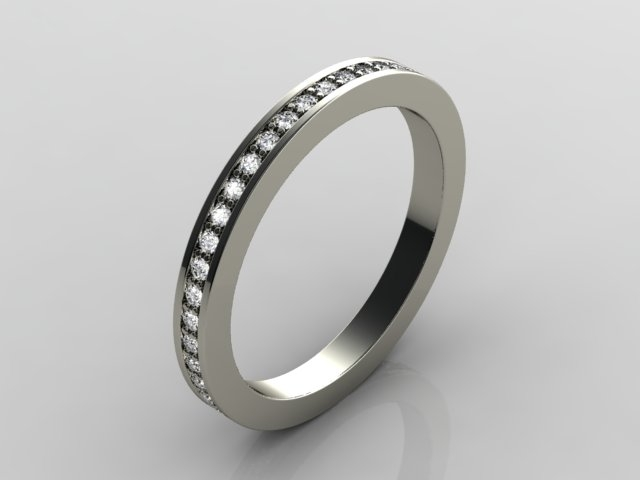
Eternity ring

An eternity ring, also known as an infinity ring, is a woman's ring comprising a band of precious metal (usually gold) set with a continuous line of identically cut gemstones (usually diamonds). It was marketed in the 1960s as a symbol of never-ending love, to be given by a spouse to their wife on the occasion of a significant anniversary. Because the presence of stones all the way round the eternity ring can make it cumbersome to wear, the alternative is to have the stones across the face of the ring only. This is sometimes referred to as a "half-eternity" ring rather than a "full" eternity ring.

Eternity rings featuring paste gems, white topaz or a mix of stones appeared in the 18th century.

== History ==
The concept of a diamond eternity ring was created in the 1960s by diamond merchant De Beers. American investigative journalist Edward Jay Epstein stated that at the time the company had a secret agreement with the Soviet Union which, in return for the creation of a "single channel" controlling the world's supply of diamonds, required the purchase of 90–95% of the uncut gem diamonds produced by Russia. The prevailing fashion at the time, particularly for engagement rings, was for them to be set with a single, large diamond. The Soviet gems were, however, small, often less than 0.25 carats. To avoid stockpiling, De Beers embarked on a campaign of promotion of jewelry containing a number of small diamonds, culminating in the eternity ring, which was aimed at older, married women. One campaign slogan aimed at husbands was, "She married you for richer or poorer. Let her know how it's going."

== Relationship to other symbolic rings ==
The tradition of giving symbolic rings for love and commitment goes way back to old times. For example, Roman betrothal rings were made of iron and worn on the 4th finger with the belief that a vein ran directly from that finger to the heart – a belief that still persists symbolically in the modern “ring finger”.

=== Wedding and engagement rings ===
Wedding rings are given to symbolize the formal commitment of marriage and are exchanged during the wedding ceremony, whereas engagement rings are a promise to marry. Traditionally, they both were simple gold or platinum bands or may have a central gemstone. In the recent times, they have been designed to suit personal taste like addition of more rare stones or have complex shapes.

On the other hand, Eternity rings are given after marriage, mostly on a special anniversary like birth of a child or during couple's wedding anniversary. They have a continuous line of gemstones around which represents unending love, rather than initiating the marital bond.

=== Promise rings ===
These are rings are given in romantic relationships before engagement. They signify commitment and loyalty without the need of the legal or ceremonial practices like ones needed in engagement or wedding rings. They can have gemstones but the designs are simpler and less formal and the meanings vary widely depending on cultural and personal context.
