= Vena amoris =

Latin phrase meaning "vein of love"

La Vena Amoris

Vena amoris is a Latin name meaning, literally, "vein of love." It describes a special blood vein that was once believed to flow directly from the fourth finger of the left hand to the heart. This belief has been cited in Western cultures as one of the reasons the engagement ring and/or wedding ring was placed on the fourth finger, or "ring finger". This myth dates back to the Medieval Ages.

While science now accepts that all blood veins flow to the heart, this was not understood at the time and would not be proven until the 17th century by the physician William Harvey.

== Origin of the phrase ==
The earliest known occurrence of the phrase vena amoris was from Henry Swinburne, an English ecclesiastical lawyer whose work covering marriage, "A Treatise of Espousal or Matrimonial Contracts", was published posthumously in 1686. Swinburne identifies the vena amoris as a vein of blood passing to the heart, found in the fourth finger of the left hand. He states that a wedding ring on that finger signifies that "as they give their hands each to other, so likewise they should give their hearts also, whereunto that vein is extended." He cites unnamed ancient sources for this belief and purports an Egyptian connection, most likely referring to a work by the fourth century Roman writer Macrobius.

Macrobius, in Saturnalia VII, refers to the connection between the ring finger and the heart but implies that it is a nerve rather than a vein. In this work, the belief is stated to have originated in Egypt.

...after turning up some books on anatomy, I discovered the truth: that there is a certain nerve which has its origin in the heart and runs from there to the finger next to the little finger of the left hand, where it ends entwined with the rest of the nerves of that finger; and that this is the reason why it seemed good to the men of old to encircle that finger with a ring, as though to honor it with a crown.

Another early reference, not specifying the hand, was by Isidore of Seville in his 7th century work De ecclesiasticis officiis XX, 8:

Men have begun to wear a ring on their fourth finger starting from the thumb, since there is a vein here which links it to the heart—something which the ancients thought worth noting and honouring.

References to this vein continue in England until the 17th century, when more came to be understood about the circulatory system. Until then, the vena amoris figured into various remedies affecting the heart. Some thought that the simple wearing of a ring on this finger, or pinching the finger, would alleviate ailments. It was sometimes referred to as the leech-finger due to blood-letting practices.

== Choice of finger ==
While the placement of wedding rings has varied greatly over time and place, the vena amoris has always been identified in the fourth finger, next to the little finger. Most sources point to it being in the left hand, but some, like Isidore of Seville, do not specify a hand. Today many western countries follow a tradition of placing wedding rings on the fourth finger of the right hand instead.
