= Divorce ring =

Jewellery symbolic of a divorce

A divorce ring is a ring that was bought, redesigned or repurposed after a divorce. The ring is regarded as a symbol of transition, independence, or representing a new phase in life. The divorce ring became a trend, receiving wide attention on social media and notable media outlets during the mid-2020s. News coverage has described the trend as an expression of personal growth, self gifting, while in others the trend is also known by the name of "Fuck you ring".

== Origins and terminology ==
Divorce ring is a new tern in the English language, gaining wide attention mainly through social media during the mid-2020s. The term describes rings worn mainly on the middle finger after the divorce, or redesigned wedding or engagement rings. According to news coverage this is a growing trend becoming part of popular culture, representing a social shift in attitude towards divorce and an individual expression of identity.

The media claims that the development of divorce rings is directly linked to social acceptance of divorce, openness to discuss and analyze the dissolution of relationships, as well as the individual will to for rituals connected to significant life transitions. In some cases the divorce ring is also known as "Fuck you ring". According to author Marcie Bianco: “It’s not an F-you to an ex-husband, necessarily, It’s an F-you to the expectations, to the norms, to this belief that a woman’s sole purpose is to be a man’s wife – not their own person.”

== Repurposing engagement and wedding rings ==
One of the most common forms of divorce rings is done by redesigning existing engagement or wedding rings, creating a new one. This is achieved by asking jewelers to change the original design, replace gemstones, change the setting, or creating a brand new ring. Other forms are buying a new ring. There is no specific design, but the rings do feature diamonds, colored gemstones, signet rings, or custom engravings. Even though there is no common convention on which finger to wear the divorce ring, it is commonly worn on the middle finger.

According to reports, most jewelers claim that the main demand is for redesigning services to the existing rings, preserving the materiel value while giving it a new personal meaning.

== Symbolism and personal meaning ==
The symbols associated to divorce ring are those of resilience, independence, renewal and personal transformation after the marriage ended. They coexist with the ring's representation of one's new relationship with themselves and the start of a new phase in life. While some say the ring commemorates survival after a difficult divorce, other say it represents personal achievement, emotional recovery or renewed autonomy. Some have said that divorce rings are the same as other milestone jewelry, like those celebrating career accomplishments or personal achievements. Psychologists suggest that wearing divorce rings reflects how symbolic rituals help people cope with major life changes.

== Media attention and celebrity influence ==
Articles about divorce rings started popping up everywhere in the press by the mid-2020s. The Guardian, BBC, Vogue, even the Financial Times ran pieces on it, treating the trend as part cultural story, part business story. Stories about celebrities help push the idea into the mainstream too. Fashion outlets made much of Emily Ratajkowski having the diamonds from her engagement ring reset into two new pieces after her divorce, a moment that's often credited with fueling interest in redesigning old jewellery post split.

Coverage has mostly framed divorce rings as one piece of a bigger shift - how people think about divorce, self expression and what marriage and personal identity mean these days.

== Jewellery industry response ==
The jewellery industry caught on to the trend, providing more redesigning and bespoke services to divorced clients. According to designers and retailers there is a greater demand for rework on old engagement and wedding rings, creating something new rather than buying new rings. The industry has flagged divorce jewelry as growing niche, sitting alongside other milestones and self gifted pieces. Marketing has leaned into themes of reinvention and empowerment, celebrating a life transition rather than a traditional relationship milestone. Some jewelers have taken another step launching dedicated collection or services built specifically around redesigning wedding jewellery after divorce.

== Criticism and debate over commercialization ==
The rise of divorce rings has sparked a debate about turning personal experience into a product. Supporters counter that redesigning or buying a divorce ring is a meaningful way to mark an ending and a fresh start, letting people reclaim objects once tied to a former marriage. Critics claim that marketing divorce jewellery just turns something emotionally messy into a sales opportunity. Others point to the fact that plenty of divorced people skip the jewellery altogether, a reminder that divorce rings are a personal choice not an established custom.
