= Engagement =

Promise to wed; period of preparation before marriage

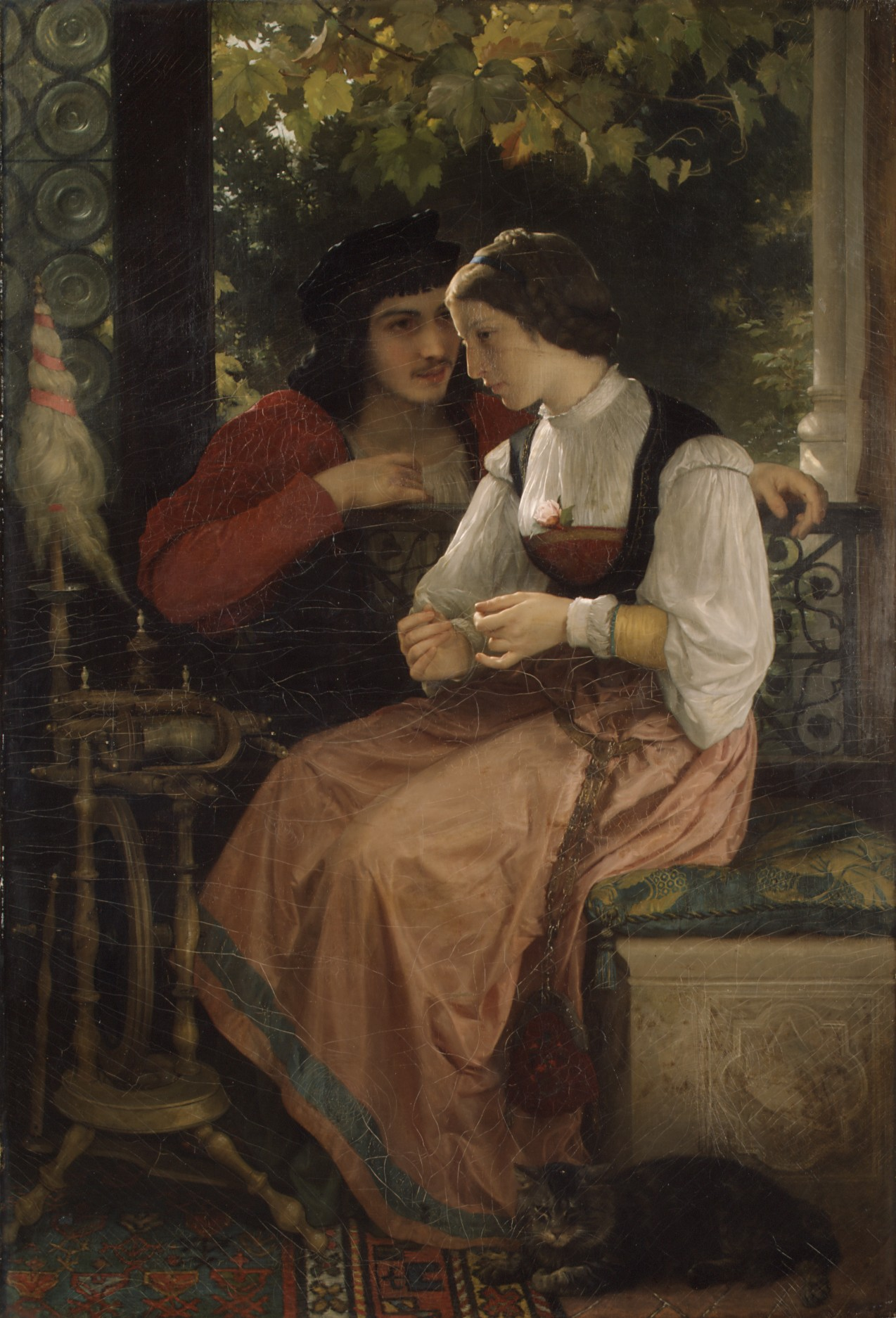
William-Adolphe Bouguereau's The Proposal

An engagement or betrothal is the period of time between the declaration of acceptance of a marriage proposal and the marriage itself (which is typically but not always commenced with a wedding). During this period, a couple is said to be fiancés (from the French), "betrothed", "intended", "affianced", "engaged to be married", or simply "engaged". Future brides and grooms may be called fiancée (feminine) or fiancé (masculine), "the betrothed", "wife-to-be" or "husband-to-be", respectively. The duration of the courtship varies vastly, and is largely dependent on cultural norms or upon the agreement of the parties involved.

Long engagements were once common in formal arranged marriages, and it was not uncommon for parents betrothing children to arrange marriages many years before the engaged couple were old enough. This is still done in some countries.

Many traditional Christian denominations have optional rites for Christian betrothal (also known as "blessing an engaged couple" or "declaration of intention") that bless and ratify the intent of a couple to marry before God and the Church.

== Origin ==
The origins of European engagement in marriage practice are found in the Jewish law (Torah), first exemplified by Abraham, and outlined in the last Talmudic tractate of the Nashim (Women) order, where marriage consists of two separate acts, called erusin (or kiddushin, meaning sanctification), which is the betrothal ceremony, and nissu'in or chupah, (Note: To be precise, nesiuin is the process, and chuppah is the method.) the actual ceremony for the marriage. Erusin changes the couple's interpersonal status, while nissu'in brings about the legal consequences of the change of status. (However, in the Talmud and other sources of Jewish law there is also a process, called shiduchin, corresponding to what today is called engagement. Marrying without such an agreement is considered immoral. To complicate matters, erusin in modern Hebrew means engagement, not betrothal.)

This was later adopted in ancient Greece as the gamos and engeysis rituals, although unlike in Judaism, the contract made in front of witness was only verbal. The giving of a ring was eventually borrowed from Judaism by Roman marriage law, with the fiancé presenting it after swearing the oath of marriage intent, and presenting of the gifts at the engagement party.

== Betrothal ==
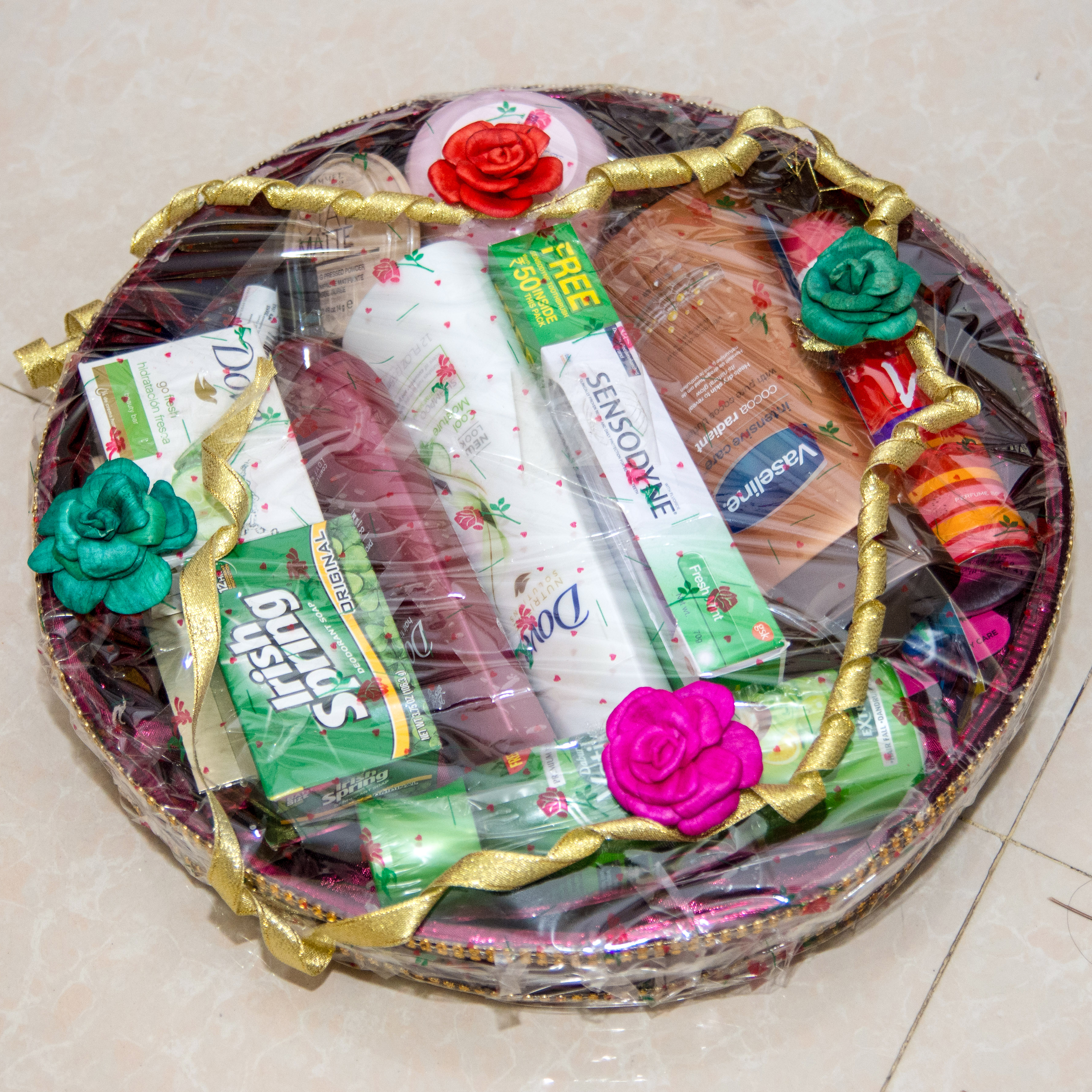
Modern engagement gifts basket in Bangladesh.

Betrothal (also called "espousal") is a formal state of engagement to be married.

Typical steps of a match were the following:

- Negotiation of a match, usually done by the couple's families with bride and groom having varying levels of input, from no input, to veto power, to a fuller voice in the selection of marriage partner.
  - This is not as widely practiced as it was historically, although it is still common in culturally conservative communities in Israel, India, Africa, and Arab states of the Persian Gulf, although most of these have a requirement that the bride be at least allowed veto power.
- Negotiation of bride price or dowry
  - In most cultures evolved from Europe, bride prices or dowries have been reduced to the engagement ring accompanying the marriage contract, while in other cultures, such as those on the Arabian Peninsula, they are still part of negotiating a marriage contract.
- Blessing by the parents and clergy
- Exchange of vows and signing of contracts
  - Often one of these is omitted
- Celebration

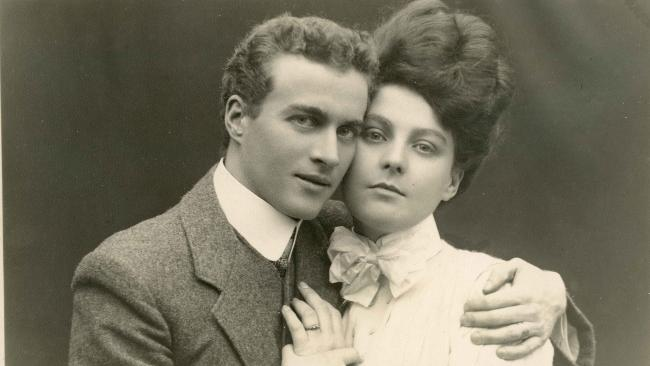
Engagement photograph of Lionel Logue and Myrtle Gruenert, 1906

The exact duration of a betrothal varies according to culture and the participants’ needs and wishes. For adults, it may be anywhere from several hours (when the betrothal is incorporated into the wedding day itself) to a period of several years. A year and a day are common in neo-pagan groups today. In the case of child marriage, betrothal might last from infancy until the age of marriage.

The responsibilities and privileges of betrothal vary. In most cultures, the betrothed couple is expected to spend much time together, learning about each other. In some historical cultures (including colonial North America), the betrothal was essentially a trial marriage, with marriage only being required in cases of conception of a child. Almost all cultures are loosening restrictions against physical contact between partners, even in cultures that normally had strong prohibitions against it. The betrothal period was also considered to be a preparatory time, in which the groom built a house, started a business or otherwise proved his readiness to enter adult society.

In medieval Europe, in canon law, a betrothal could be formed by the exchange of vows in the future tense ("I will take you as my wife/husband", instead of "I take you as my wife/husband"), but sexual intercourse consummated the vows, making a binding marriage rather than a betrothal. Although these betrothals could be concluded with only the vows spoken by the couple, they had legal implications: Richard III of England had his older brother's children declared illegitimate on the grounds their father had been betrothed to another woman when he married their mother.

A betrothal is considered to be a "semi-binding" contract. Normal reasons for invalidation of a betrothal include:

- Revelation of a prior commitment or marriage
- Evidence of infidelity
- Failure to conceive (in "trial marriage" cultures)
- Failure of either party to meet the financial and property stipulations of the betrothal contract

Normally, either party can break a betrothal, though in certain traditions, a financial penalty (such as forfeit of the bride price) applies. In some common law countries, including England and Wales and many US states, it was once possible for the spurned partner (often only the woman) to sue the other for breach of promise or "heart-balm". This provided some protection in an age where virginity at marriage was considered important and having a failed engagement could damage one's reputation, but this tort has become obsolete in most jurisdictions as attitudes to premarital sex have softened and emphasis shifted to allowing people to leave loveless relationships.

=== Judaism ===
In Jewish weddings during Talmudic times (c.1st century BC – 6th century AD), the two ceremonies of betrothal (erusin) and wedding usually took place up to a year apart; the bride lived with her parents until the actual marriage ceremony (nissuin), which would take place in a room or tent that the groom had set up for her. Since the Middle Ages the two ceremonies have taken place as a combined ceremony performed in public. The betrothal is now generally part of the Jewish wedding ceremony, accomplished when the groom gives the bride the ring or another object of at least nominal value. As mentioned above, betrothal in Judaism is separate from engagement; breaking a betrothal requires a formal divorce, and violation of betrothal is considered adultery.

=== Christianity ===
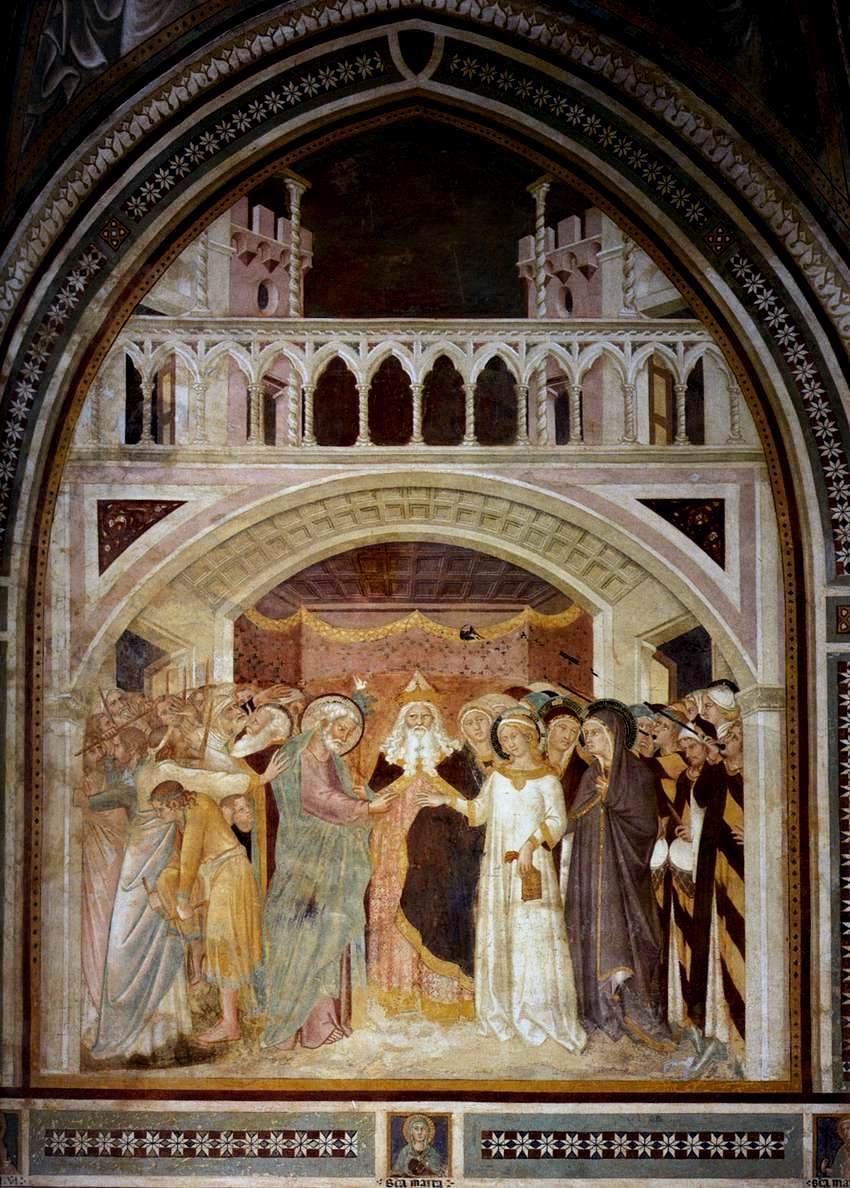
Christian art depicting the betrothal of Joseph the Carpenter and the Virgin Mary

In most localities, the Rite of Betrothal (also known as "blessing an engaged couple" or "declaration of intention") as a precursor to Holy Matrimony is an optional practice in traditional forms of Christianity today that blesses and ratifies the intention of two Christians to marry one another. Many Christian denominations provide liturgies for Christian betrothal, which often feature prayer, Bible readings, a blessing of the engagement rings (in cultures in which rings are used), and a blessing of the couple. A betrothal makes what a couple promises to one another sanctified by God and the Church. A Christian engagement (betrothal) ceremony, which may be followed with a party, is normative in certain parts of the world, as with the Christians of India and Pakistan.

==== Catholic Church ====
Historically, betrothal in Roman Catholicism is a formal contract considered as binding as marriage, and a divorce is necessary to terminate a betrothal. Betrothed couples are regarded legally as husband and wife – even before their wedding and physical union. The concept of an official engagement period in Western European culture may have begun in 1215 at the Fourth Lateran Council, headed by Pope Innocent III, which decreed that "marriages are to be ... announced publicly in the churches by the priests during a suitable and fixed time so that, if legitimate impediments exist, they may be made known." Such a formal church announcement of the intent to marry is known as banns. In some jurisdictions, reading the banns may be part of one type of legal marriage.

==== Protestant churches ====
The Lutheran book of Liturgical Forms includes the "Form and Manner of Betrothal in Church", which can take place in the church or alternatively, in the house of the bride. This rite can be found throughout history, such as in early Lutheran liturgical texts, the Stasbourg C.O. 1604 being an example. Liturgical Forms states that The Rite of Betrothal is seen as an "admirable practice of plighting one's troth in church, so in keeping with the holiness and importance of marital betrothal as the incipient marital life."

The 2019 Book of Common Prayer, used by Anglican Christian denominations such as the Anglican Church in North America, includes a Christian rite of betrothal called "A Brief Liturgy for the Signing of the Declaration of Intention" in which a Christian couple ratifies their intention before God and the Church to marry. During this liturgy, the following is signed and dated by the engaged couple after the sign of peace:

“We, N.N. and N.N., desiring to receive the blessing of Holy Matrimony in the Church, do solemnly declare that we hold marriage to be a lifelong union of husband and wife as it is set forth in the Book of Common Prayer. We believe it is established by God for the procreation of children, and their nurture in the knowledge and love of the Lord; for mutual joy, and for the help and comfort given one another in prosperity and adversity; to maintain purity, so that husbands and wives, with all the household of God, might serve as holy and undefiled members of the Body of Christ; and for the upbuilding of Christ’s kingdom in family, church, and society, to the praise of his holy Name. We do engage ourselves, so far as in us lies, to make our utmost effort to establish this relationship and to seek God’s help thereto.”

Following the signing of the declaration of intention, the couple is blessed by the priest:

Now that N. and N. have declared their intention for a Holy Marriage, and have begun the process of pre-marital preparation, let us pray for their relationship [and for their families].
Almighty God, we thank you for the love of N. and N., and we ask your blessing upon them [and their families] during this time of preparation. Open their minds and hearts to one another, enable them faithfully to receive your Word and Sacrament, and help us to support them, that they may rightly prepare for their marriage. And, we pray, give us wisdom to uphold and encourage all who have been united in Holy Matrimony; through Jesus Christ our Lord. Amen.

The Lutheran churches, the Anglican Communion, the Methodist churches and the Presbyterian churches have questions and responses for family members in its Rite of Betrothal, which is sometimes incorporated into the Service of Holy Matrimony itself.

==== Orthodox churches ====
In the Eastern Orthodox and Oriental Orthodox churches, the Rite of Betrothal is traditionally performed in the narthex (entranceway) of the church, to indicate the couple's first entrance into the married estate. The priest blesses the couple and gives them lit candles to hold. Then, after a litany, and a prayer at which everyone bows, he places the bride's ring on the ring finger of the groom's right hand, and the groom's ring on the bride's finger. The rings are subsequently exchanged three times, either by the priest or by the best man, after which the priest says a final prayer. Traditionally, the betrothal service takes place at the time the engagement is announced, though in certain localities it may performed immediately before the wedding ceremony itself. The exchange of rings is not a part of the wedding service in the Eastern churches, but only occurs at the betrothal ceremony. Traditionally, the groom's ring is gold and the bride's ring is silver.

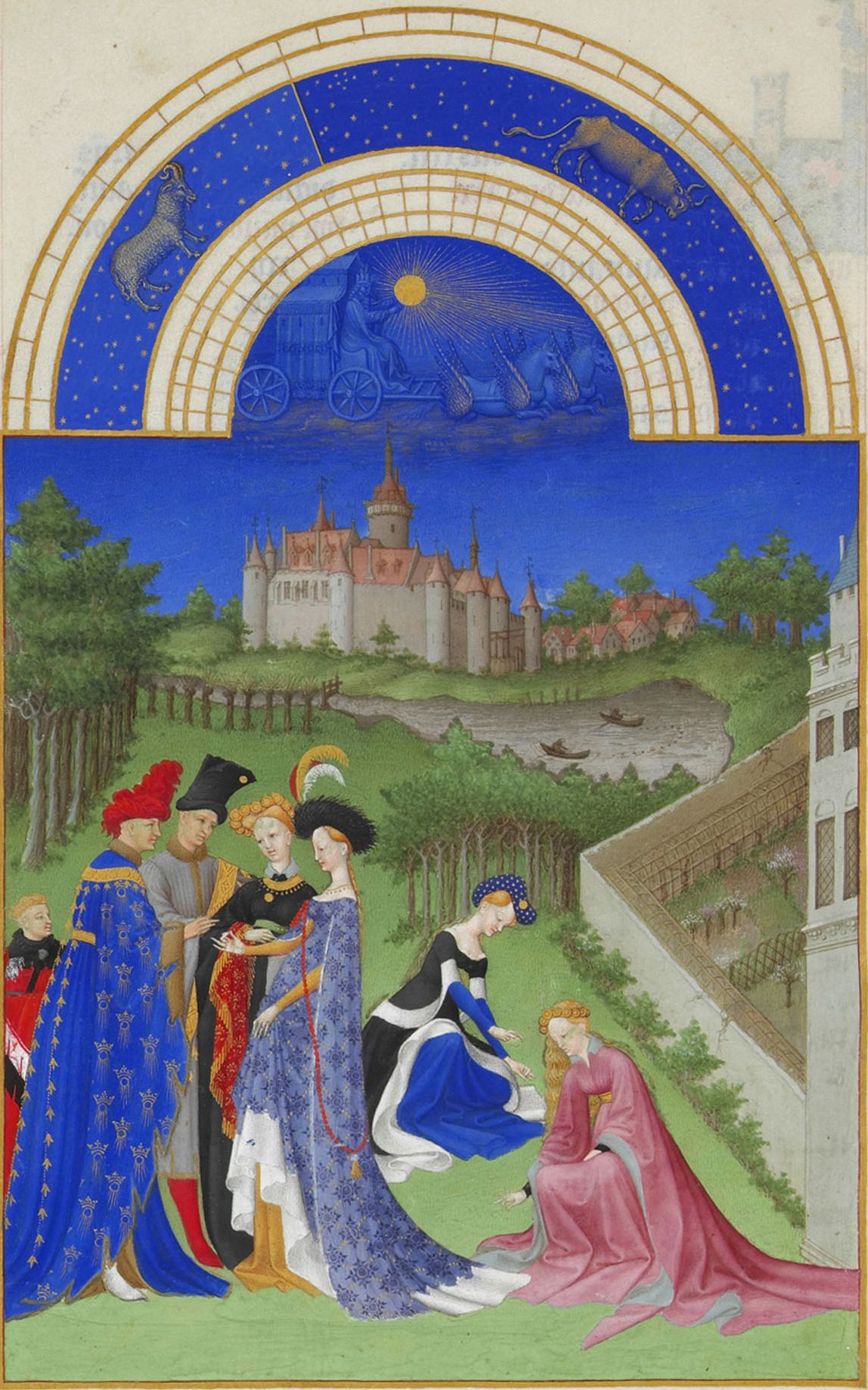
The Très Riches Heures du Duc de Berry depicting a betrothal. Musée Condé, Chantilly.

== Engagement rings ==
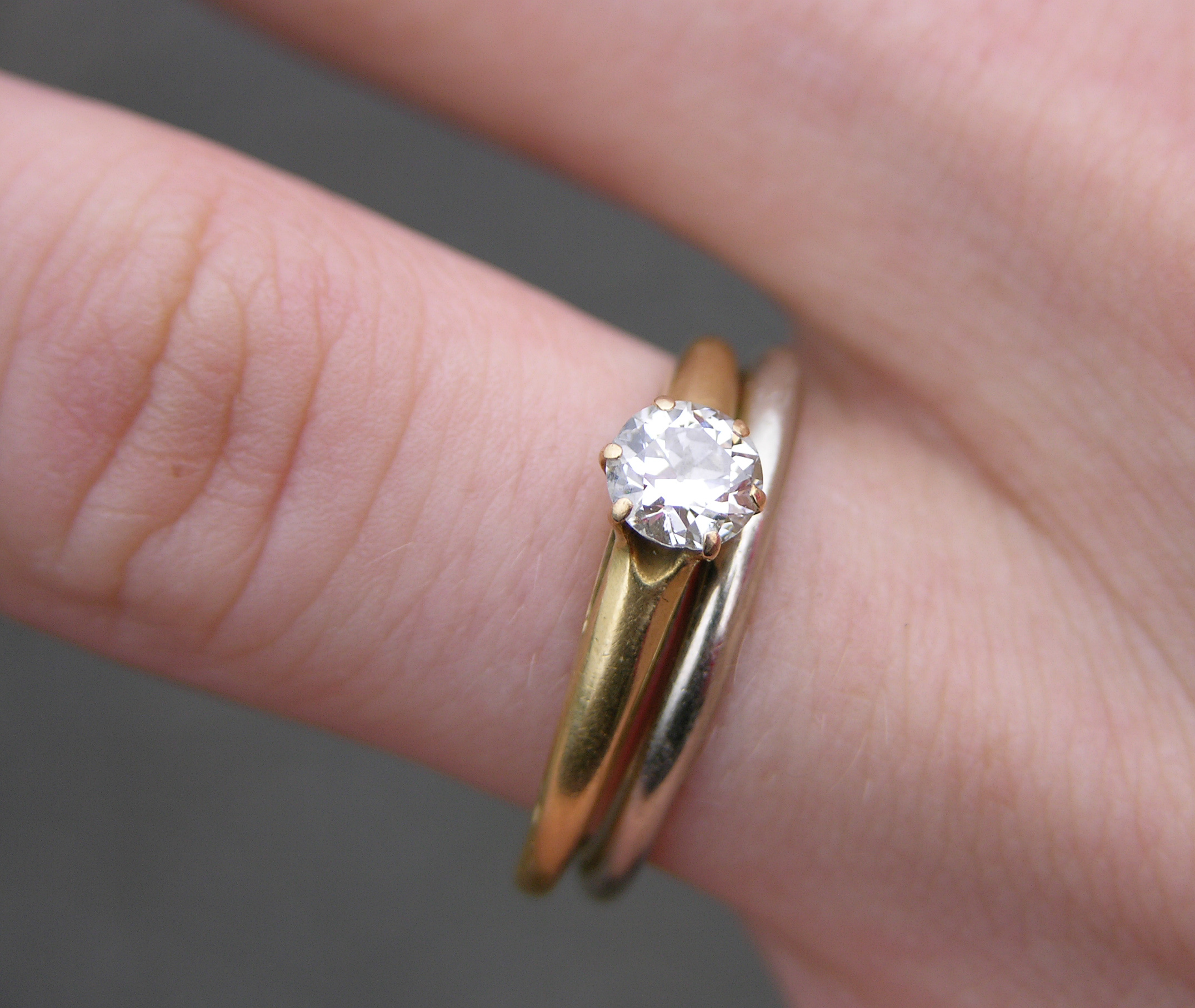
A white gold wedding ring and a single-diamond, gold-banded engagement ring. The engagement ring is usually worn on the outside.

Customs for engagement rings vary according to time, place, and culture. An engagement ring has historically been uncommon, and when such a gift was given, it was separate from the wedding ring.

The first instance of the tradition of giving a ring for marriage in the Hebrew Bible is in Genesis 24:22, when a golden nose ring (Chayei Sarah 24:22) was given by Eliezer of Damascus to Rebecca, with Saadiah Gaon also citing as a possible source of the practice in the phrase in Nehemiah 7:46 be’nei tabbaot (children of the rings). The latter case refers to betrothal (see above) rather than engagement; one of the three ways in which betrothal may be effected in Judaism is by the husband giving the bride money or an object of at least nominal value. In fact, it is a long-standing practice within Judaism to contract the betrothal with a ring.

The practice of a marriage ring in Byzantine Empire date back to 3rd century CE.

Romantic rings from the time of the Roman Empire sometimes bore clasped hands symbolizing contract, from which the later Celtic Claddagh symbol (two hands clasping a heart) may have evolved as a symbol of love and commitment between two people. Romans believed the circle was a bond between the two people who were to be married and signified eternity, but was first practiced on the fourth finger/ring finger by the Romans, who believed this finger to be the beginning of the vena amoris ("vein of love"), the vein that leads to the heart. In cultures with European origin, and many other countries, an engagement ring is worn following the practice of the Romans who "...wore the ring either on the right middle finger or the left ring [4th] finger, from which, according to ancient Egyptian physicians, a nerve led directly to the heart." The custom in Continental Europe and other countries is to wear it on the right hand. One historical exception arose in monarchical regimes, in which a nobleman entering into morganatic marriage, a marriage in which the person, usually the woman, of lower rank stayed at the same rank instead of rising ranks, would present their left hand to receive the ring, hence the alternative term "marriage with the left hand" (Ger. Ehe zur linken Hand), the offspring of such marriages considered to be disinherited from birth.

The modern Western form of the practice of giving or exchanging engagement rings is traditionally thought to have begun in 1477 when Maximilian I, Holy Roman Emperor, gave Mary of Burgundy a diamond ring as an engagement present.

In other countries like Argentina, men and women each wear a ring similar to wedding bands. They are made of silver ("alianza de plata") when manifesting an informal "boyfriend-girlfriend" relationship, though this first step might not always happen; howbeit depending on finances, this may be the only ring given at all. The gold band ("anillo de compromiso" or "alianza de oro") is given to the bride when the commitment is formal and the [optional] diamond ring ("cintillo") is reserved for the wedding ceremony when the groom gives it to the bride. The gold band that the groom wore during the engagement – or a new one, as some men choose not to wear them during engagement – is then given to the groom by the bride; and the bride receives both the original gold band and the new diamond at the ceremony. The bride's diamond ring is worn on top of the engagement band at the wedding and thereafter, especially at formal occasions or parties; otherwise the engagement band suffices for daily wear for both parties. At the wedding, the rings are swapped from the right to the left hand. In Brazil, they are always made of gold, and there is no tradition for the engagement ring. Both men and women wear the wedding band on their right hand while engaged, and, after they marry, they shift the rings to their left hands.

In the modern era, some women's wedding rings are made into two separate pieces. One part is given to her to wear as an engagement ring when she accepts the marriage proposal and the other during the wedding ceremony. When worn together, the two rings look like one piece of jewelry. The engagement ring is not worn during the wedding ceremony, when the wedding ring is put by the groom on the finger of the bride, and sometimes by the bride onto the groom's finger. After the wedding, the engagement ring is put back on, and is usually worn on the outside of the wedding ring.

== Engagement parties ==
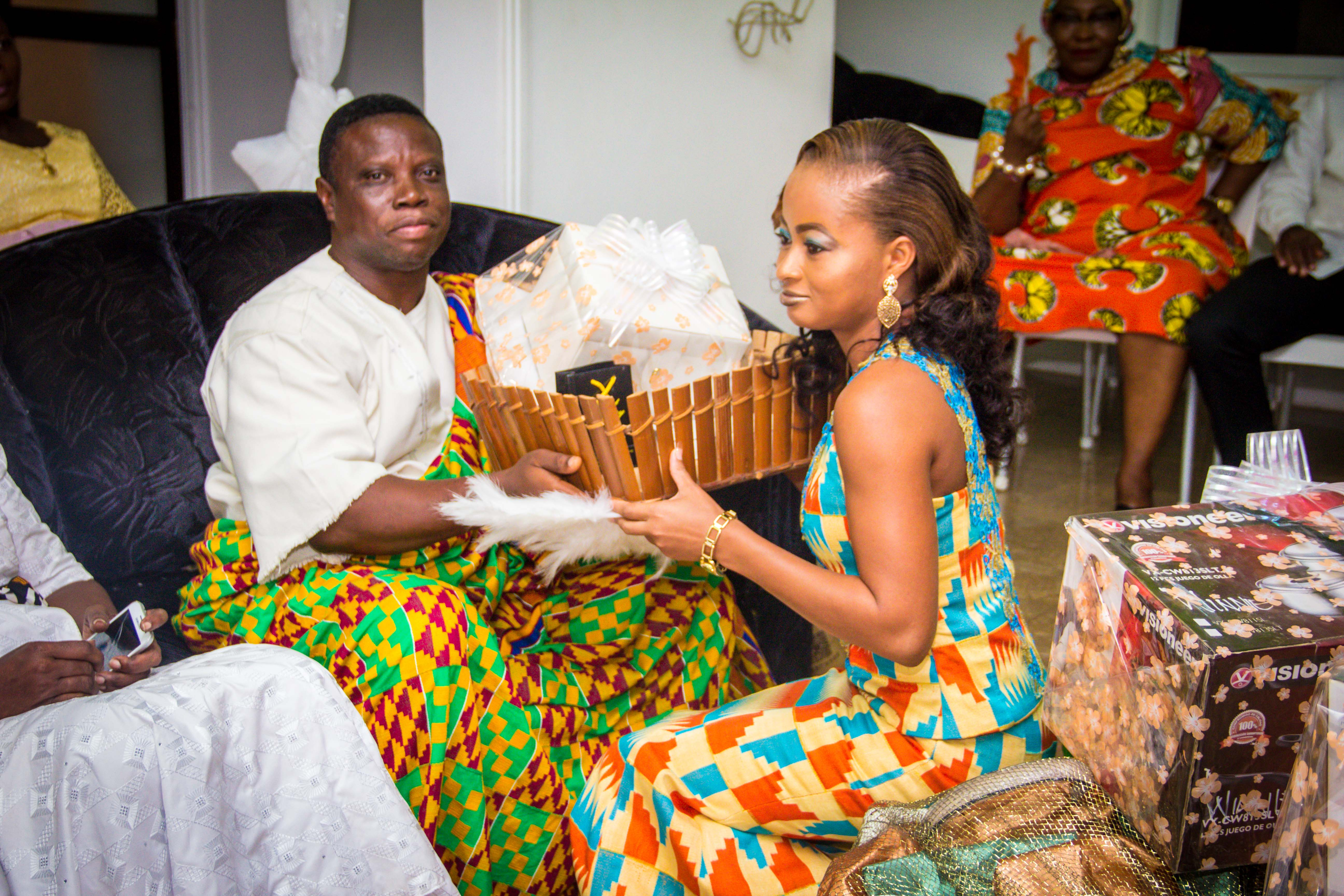
Ghanaian Engagement Ceremony. The bride presenting a gift to her father

In contemporary American culture some engagements are announced at an engagement party, traditionally hosted by the bride's parents. These parties help introduce both the bride and groom's friends and family to each other in one place prior to the wedding. Often contemporary engagement parties are either cocktail parties or dinners with décor kept to a minimum. Gifts are not often given until either the wedding itself or a bridal shower.

In ancient Greece, engagement parties were held without the bride and took place to discuss the legal and economic aspects of the marriage. Later, engagement parties were when both sides announced a legal union prior to marriage where if one side broke the agreement they would have to pay the wronged side. Engagements became non-legally binding and by the early 20th century some couples would announce their engagement in the local paper.

== See also ==
- Churching of women
- Rèiteach
- Kranzgeld

== Bibliography ==
- Rite of Betrothal. Society of Saint Pius X.
- Shorter Book of Blessings. International Commission on English in the Liturgy. 1 January 1990.
