= Gimmal ring =

Ring with two or three links that fit together

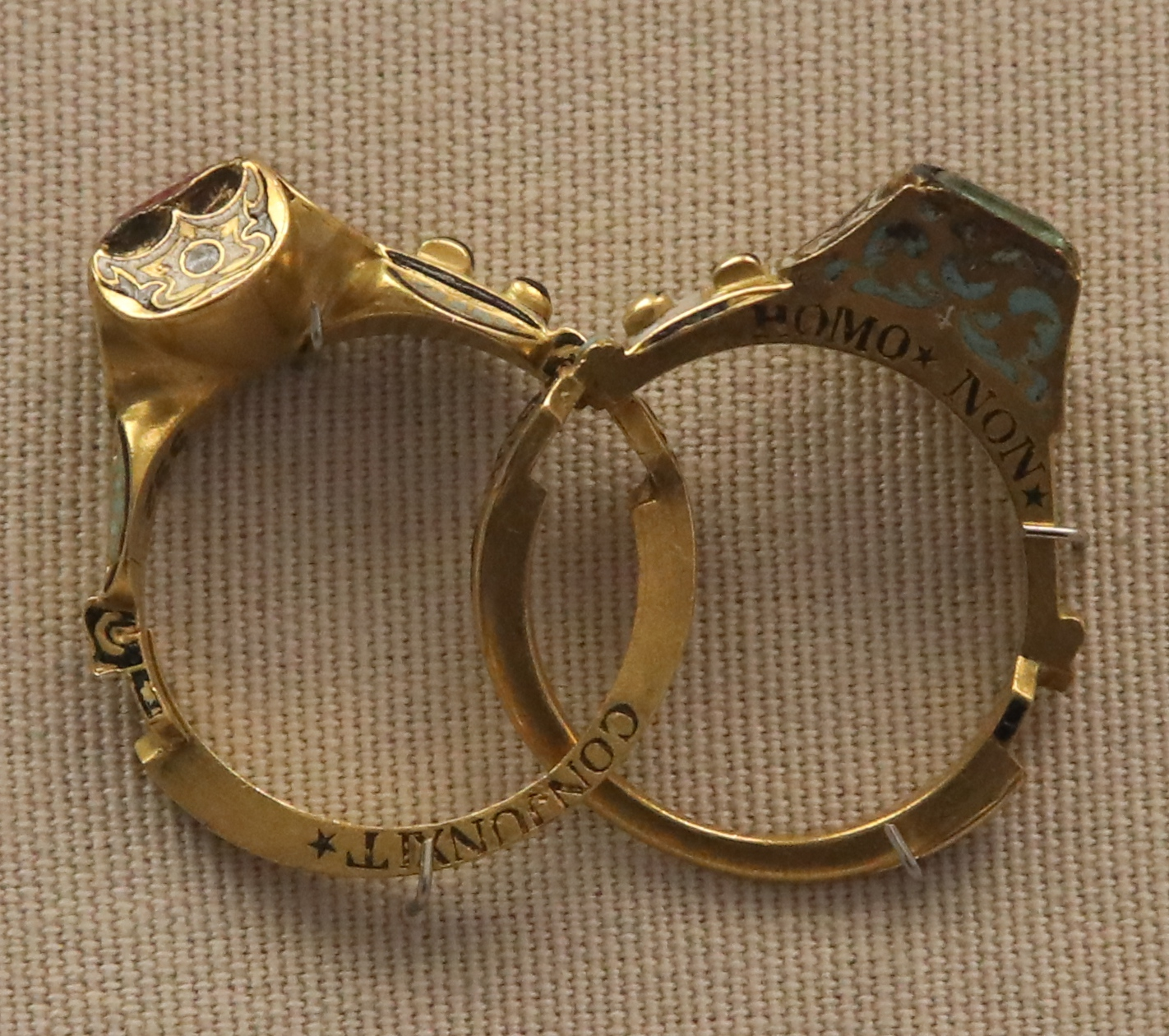
A Gimmal ring with the hoop opened

A gimmal ring, or gimmel ring, is a ring with two or three hoops or links that fit together to form one complete ring. The name gimmal comes from Latin gemellus, twin, via Old French. They were known as joint rings in Elizabethan England.

In the 16th and 17th centuries, such rings were fashionable in England, Germany, and other countries, and were often used as betrothal rings. The engaged couple would wear one hoop each and rejoin them to use as a wedding ring. With triple link rings, a third person could witness the couple's vows and hold the third part of the ring until the marriage.

An early gimmal band, consisting of two interlocked rings sculpted to form a single ring, is to be found in the Victoria and Albert Museum, dated to 1350. Henry III of England met the Count of Gynes in 1202 and gave him a gimmal ring set with a ruby and two emeralds. Martin Luther wed Catherine Bora in 1525 with a gimmal ring inscribed "Whom God has joined together, Let no man put asunder".

Around 1600, the gimmal ring began to sometimes incorporate the clasped hands of the fede ring and a third symbol, a heart, was added, sometimes with a third shank. Designs involving clasped hands, and sometimes a heart, remained popular after the Renaissance. Similar imagery is found on other love rings, including claddagh rings.

The Benjamin Zucker collection in the Walters Museum in Baltimore contains two elaborate gimmal rings incorporating small hidden enameled sculptural details visible only when the bands are separated. By the late 18th century, multiple shanks of five or more were made, sometimes collected at the back by a pivot, so they hinged like a fan.

== Cultural references ==
There are several references to gimmal rings in Shakespeare's plays, including a joint-ring mentioned in Othello. Robert Herrick's poem The Jimmall Ring or True-Love Knot (1648) is founded on a gimmal (jimmall) ring.

A gimmal ring is important to characters in Dryden's Don Sebastian (1690), which includes the passage:

A curious artist wrought 'em,
With joynts so close as not to be perceiv'd;
Yet are they both each other's counterpart.

== See also ==
- Puzzle ring, which was probably derived from gimmal rings

== Sources ==
- Diana Scarisbrick, Takayuki Toyama, Kanji Hashimoto, Historic Rings: Four Thousand Years of Craftsmanship (2004)
- Gimmel ring
