= Acrostic ring =

Use of gemstones to spell out words

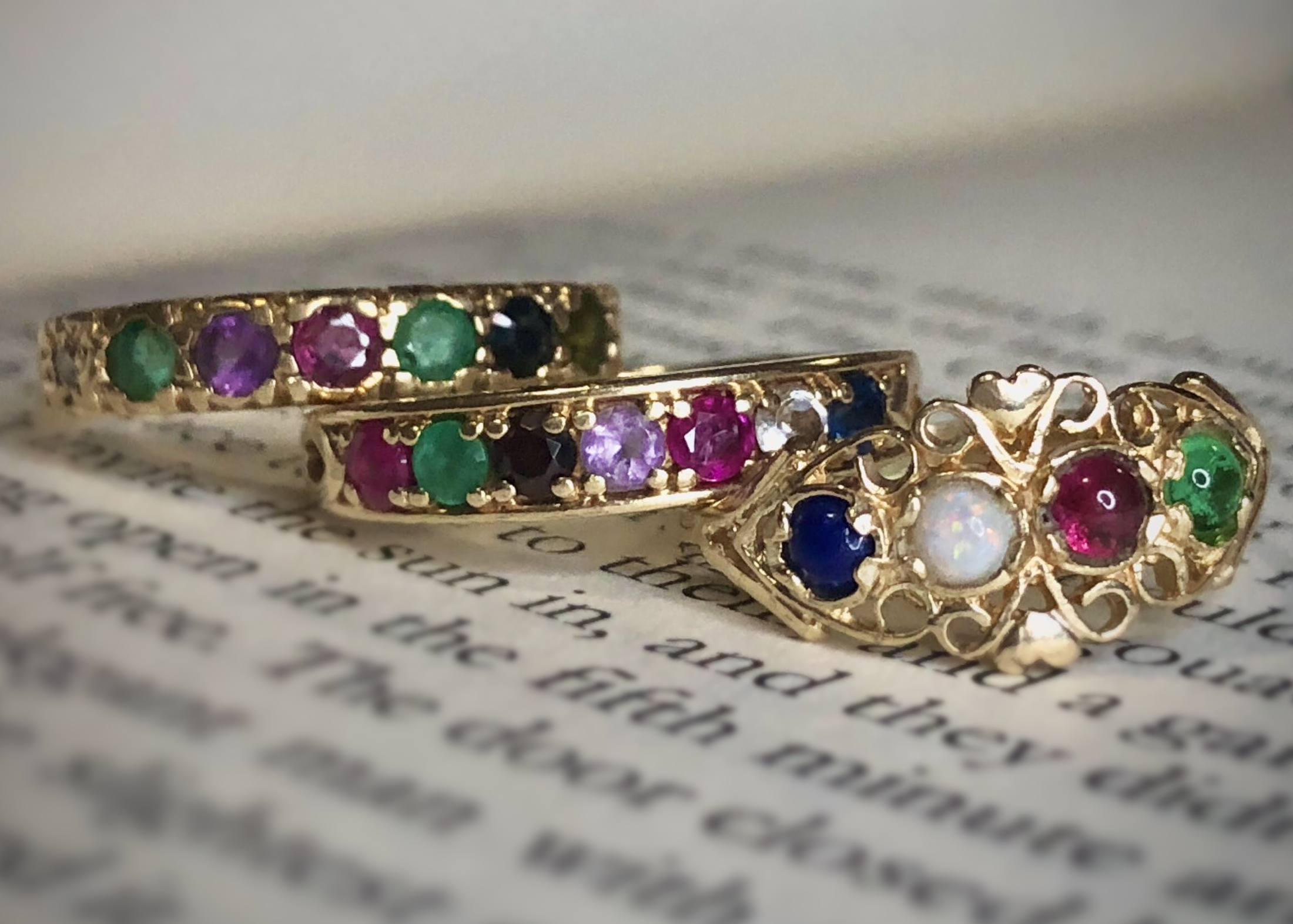
Acrostic rings: a dearest ring, a regards ring, and a love ring.

An acrostic ring is a ring on which the initials of the gemstones on the band spell out a word in an acrostic style. In some cases, paste gems were used instead of precious stones.

== History ==
Acrostic rings were developed in France in the early 19th century by the jewelry company Mellerio dits Meller, and later became popular in England. They were given and worn during the Georgian and Victorian eras. Acrostic rings were given as romantic gifts, and their messages were sentimental. Alternatively, they would be used to form a secret message. Some acrostic rings were used as engagement rings.

Acrostic rings have been created and given in later eras, including in the 20th and 21st centuries.

== Variants ==
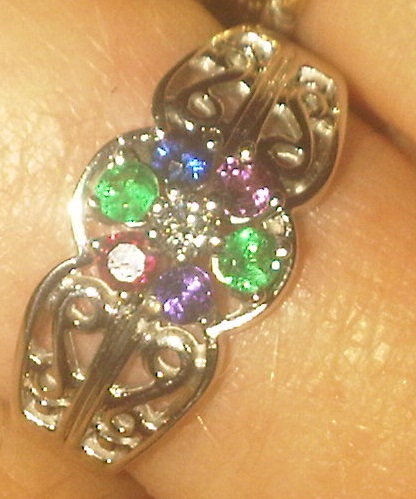
A dearest acrostic ring.

Acrostic rings were made with gemstones representing sentimental and romantic words, including the following:

- Dearest – diamond, emerald, amethyst, ruby, emerald, sapphire, topaz. Alternatively, turquoise was used instead of a topaz.
- Regards – ruby, emerald, garnet, amethyst, ruby, diamond, sapphire. "Regard" was also spelled, with an omission of the sapphire.
- Adore – amethyst, diamond, opal, ruby, emerald.
- Love – lapis lazuli, opal, vermarine, emerald.

French words such as souvenir from se souvenir (to remember) and amitié (friendship) were also represented in acrostic jewelry.

Some acrostic rings represented lovers' names.

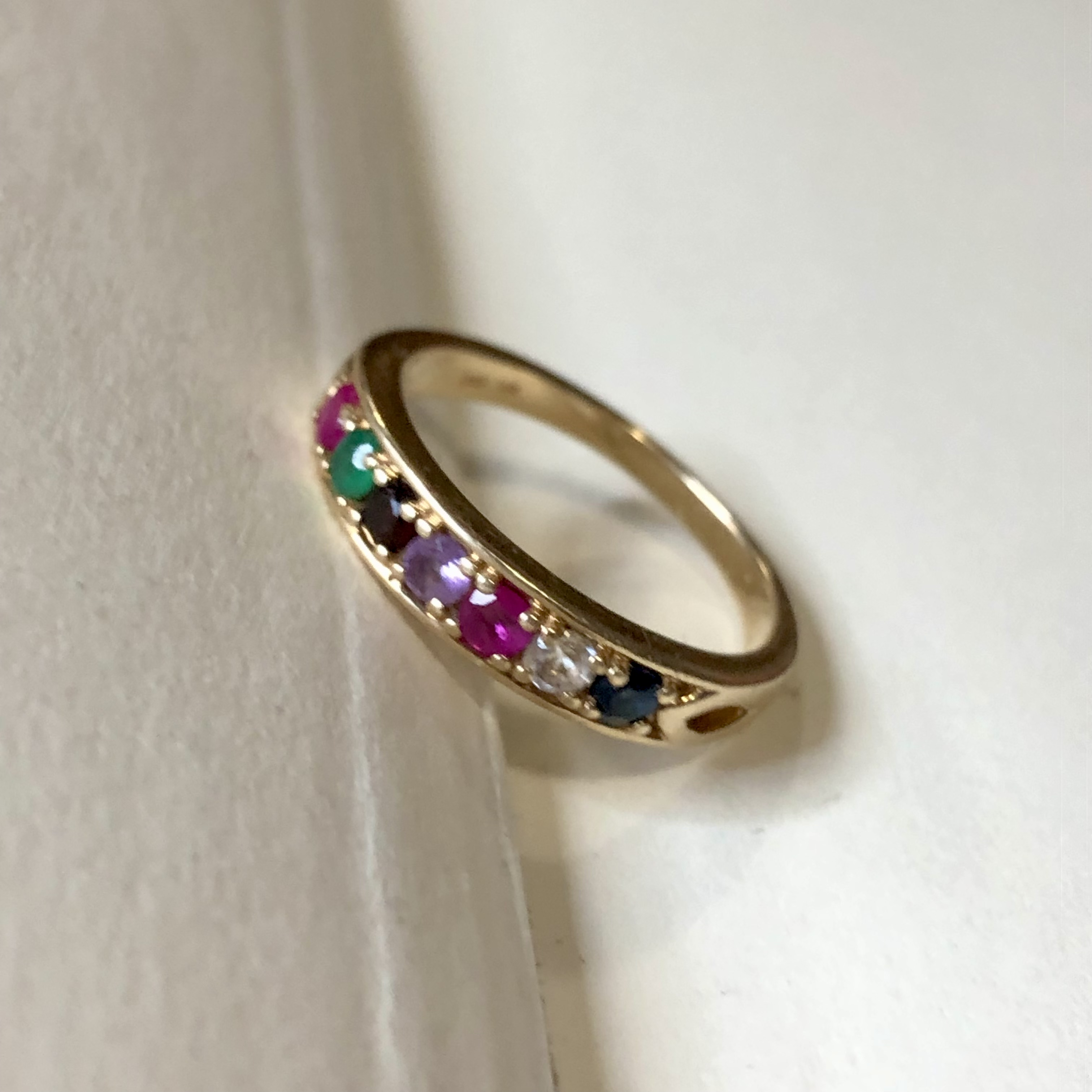
A regards acrostic ring.

The letters of the spelt word come from the initials of some gems' names. Accordingly, stones used for each letter include:

- A: amethyst
- D: diamond
- E: emerald
- G: garnet
- L: lapis lazuli
- O: opal
- R: ruby
- S: sapphire
- T: topaz, tourmaline, or turquoise
- V: vermarine or vermeil (garnet)
