= Henry Swinburne (lawyer) =

English ecclesiastical lawyer and scholar

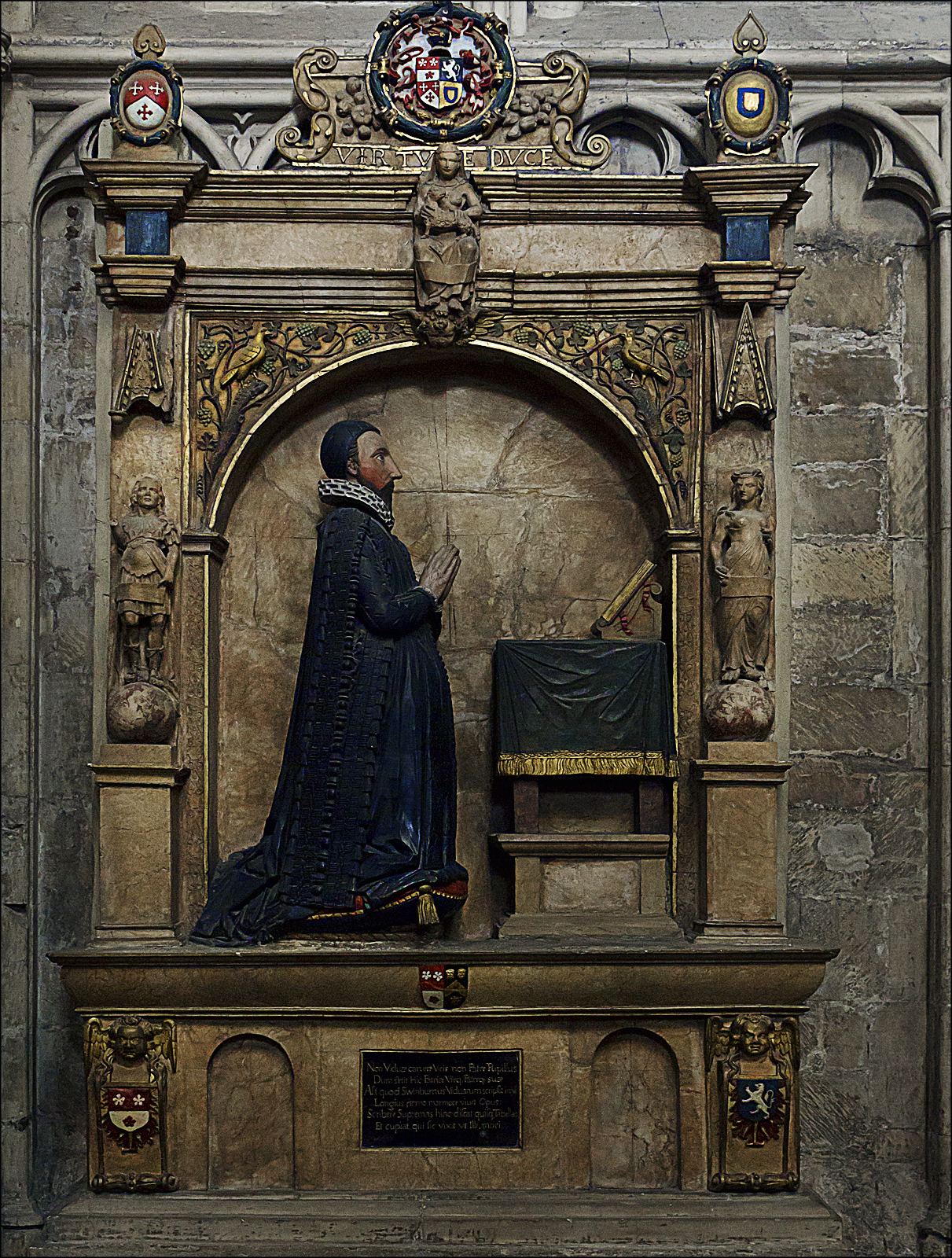
Mural monument to Henry Swinburne in York Minster

Arms of Swinburne: Per fess gules and argent, three cinquefoils counterchanged

Henry Swinburne (1551–1624) was an English ecclesiastical lawyer and scholar. Initially working as a clerk at a Consistory Court he attended the University of Oxford from 1576 to 1580, graduating with a Bachelor of Civil Law (BCL) degree, and was admitted to the bar at York to work as an ecclesiastical lawyer. As well as his work as a lawyer he held various administrative and judicial positions. He died in 1624.

Swinburne is best known for his two legal treatises, particularly A briefe treatise of Testaments and last Wills which remained a standard work on family law for 200 years after his death. Swinburne was the first ecclesiastical law writer to write in English.

== Early life and education ==
Swinburne was born in 1551 in the ward of Micklegate, York, to Thomas Swinburne and Alison Dalynson. After an education at Archbishop Holgate's School he became a clerk in the Consistory court in York. After becoming a notary public of the court he matriculated to the University of Oxford in 1576, studying at Hart Hall, and while there met and married Ellen Lant, daughter of Bartholomew Lant. He graduated from Broadgates Hall, Oxford in 1580 with a Bachelor of Civil Law degree, and a few years later was called to the ecclesiastical bar at York.

== Career ==
As well as his work as a lawyer, Swinburne also held multiple judicial and administrative posts. He became Auditor of the Peculier of the Dean of York in 1593, commissionary of the York exchequer court in 1604 and worked in the Court of High Commission between 1607 and 1622. By 1613 his wife had died and he married Margaret Wentworth - they had a son, Toby Swinburne, in the same year.

== Writing ==
Swinburne is best known for his two treatises on law - A briefe treatise of Testaments and last Wills, first published in 1590, and A treatise of Spousals, or Matrimonial Contracts, published posthumously in 1686 based on a draft found in Lincoln's Inn. Swinburne was the first ecclesiastical law writer to write his books in English.

A briefe treatise of Testaments and last Wills was his most well-known work, and became a standard text for family law for almost 200 years, being reissued in seven different editions up to 1803. It was first published in 1590 by John Windet and corrected and edited by Swinburne himself. The book was intended to rectify a fault in the canon law system - that there were so many hundreds of books on various bits of canon law that it was impossible to read all of them and get an accurate picture of a particular area of law. Swinburne intended to rectify this by publishing a single book on family law which could act as a substitute to the hundreds of other texts on the matter. The book was written in English so that it could be read by a wider audience, and was the first ecclesiastical law text to be written in such a way.

The book was "a model of clarity and scientific technique" set up in an orderly fashion that contrasted sharply with the disjointed nature of the nearest common law equivalents by James Dyer and Ambrose Gilbert. It summarised a mass of canon law judgments previously written in Latin and became a "landmark in jurisprudence". After the copyright was acquired by the Company of Stationers in 1607 it was reprinted and edited repeatedly.

A treatise of Spousals, or Matrimonial Contracts was being written up to Swinburne's death in 1624, and was only published in 1686 when a draft was found in the library of Lincoln's Inn. There is evidence that it was intended to be one of three volumes on the subject, although the other two were never started, even in draft form.

== Bibliography ==
- Baker, John (1993). "Famous English canon lawyers: Part 5: Henry Swinburne B.L.C. (1624)". Ecclesiastical Law Journal. 3 (12). doi:10.1017/S0956618X00001666. ISSN 0956-618X.
