= Puzzle ring =

Jewelry ring

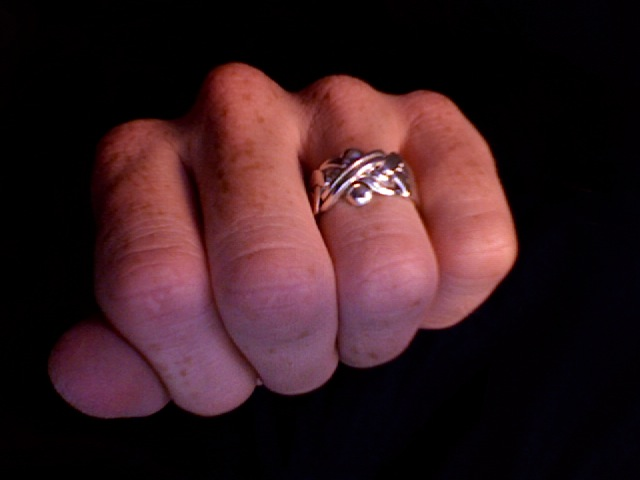
A completed puzzle ring with six bands.

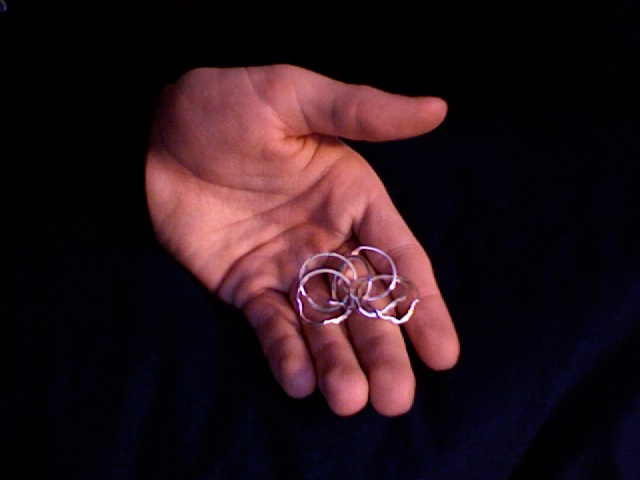
The same ring, broken apart into six separate rings. The rings are interlocked so as not to become misplaced.

A puzzle ring is a jewelry ring made up of multiple interconnected bands, which is a type of mechanical puzzle most likely developed as an elaboration of the European gimmal ring.

The puzzle ring is also sometimes called a "Turkish wedding ring". In Sweden, Norway and Finland, puzzle rings are often carried by military veterans (in Norway the rings are often called the "Lebanon ring" after military people have served in the United Nations Interim Forces in Lebanon UNIFIL), where the number of rings correspond to the number of tours made, starting at 4 rings for 1 tour (mostly for Sweden, not usually for Norwegian veterans). In Finland, you can use the ring if you have served more than 6 months.
