= Mangalasutra =

Necklace, tied around the bride's neck in Hindu weddings

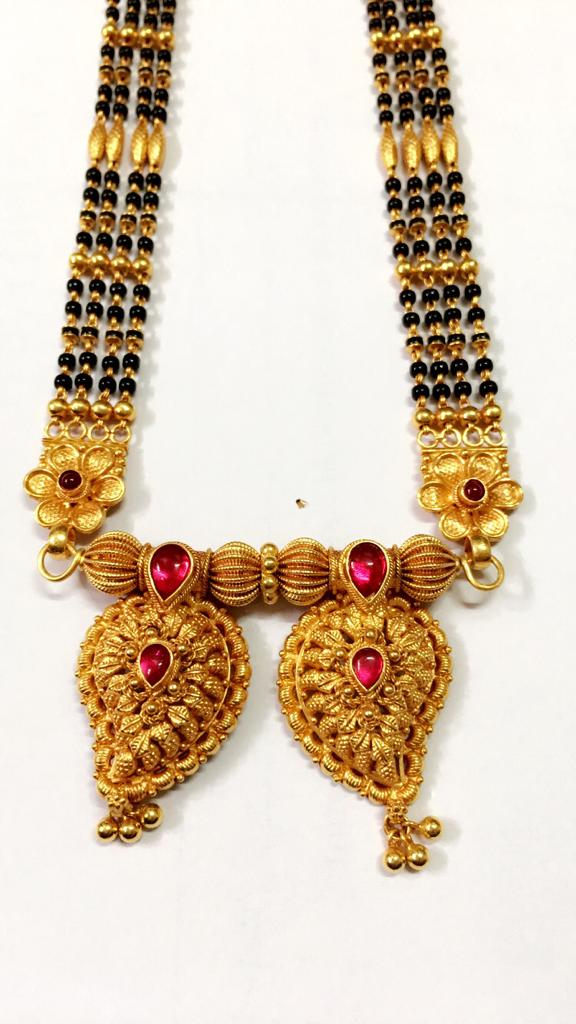
Contemporary Mangalsutra with black beads

A mangala sutra (Sanskrit: मङ्गलसूत्रम्, romanised: maṅgalasūtram), or tali (ISO: tāḷi), is a necklace worn by certain groups of married women from the Indian subcontinent. It is typically associated with Hindu weddings, during which a ceremony known as the Mangalya Dharanam (Sanskrit for 'wearing the auspicious') may be conducted, upon which the mangalasutra is tied around the neck of the bride by the groom. Depending on regions and communities, its use is attested among some non-Hindus, though the rituals and beliefs attached to it may differ. Similarly, this necklace and its ceremonial use are not a systematic element of Hindu matrimonial traditions, being absent, at least historically, in several communities.

Mangalasutra literally means "an auspicious thread" that is knotted around the bride's neck and is worn by her for the remainder of her marriage. It is usually a necklace with black beads strung from a black or yellow thread prepared with turmeric. Sometimes gold, white or red beads are also added to the mangala sutra, depending on regional variation. The necklace serves as a visual marker of marital status.

The tying of the mangala sutra is a common practice in India, Sri Lanka, and Nepal. The idea of sacred thread existed for centuries, even going back to the Sangam period. But the nature of these auspicious threads has evolved over time and varies widely according to various communities.

== Names ==
The nuptial chain can take several names depending on languages, while its Sanskrit denomination, maṅgalasūtram, remains the most widespread one:

- Tamil: மாங்கல்யம், romanized: mangalyam, or திருமாங்கல்யம், thirumangalyam
- Marathi: मंगळसूत्र, romanized: mangala sutra
- Kannada: ಮಾಂಗಲ್ಯ ಸೂತ್ರ, romanized: mangalyasutra
- Telugu: మాంగళ్యము, romanized: mangalyamu, or మంగళసూత్రము, mangalasutramu, or పుస్తెలు, pustelu

The root word Tali can also be mentioned, common among languages from Southern India and Ceylon Island:

- Tamil: தாலி, romanized: tali
- Kannada: ತಾಳಿ, romanized: tali
- Telugu: తాళి, romanized: tali
- Tulu: ತಾಲಿ, romanized: tali
- Malayalam: താലി, romanized: tali
- Sinhala: තැල්ල, romanized: thella

In Southern India, the notion of tali (puste in Telugu, vati or dorla in Marathi) mainly designates the pendant mounted to the necklace, while mangala sutra or mangalyam refers to the necklace in its whole, respecting its initial meaning.

The Mangalya Dharanam ceremony

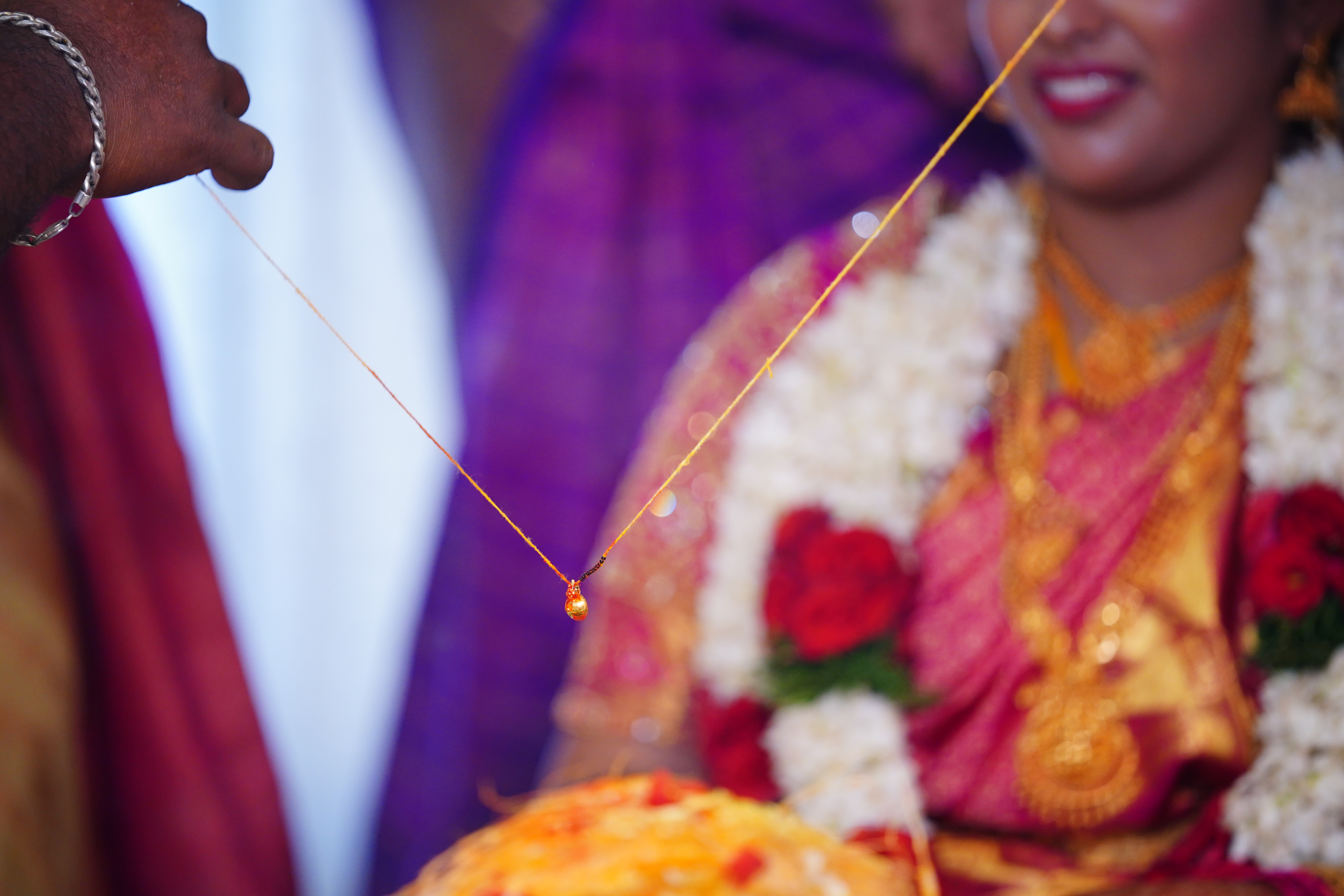
A mangala sutra before being tied around a bride's neck.

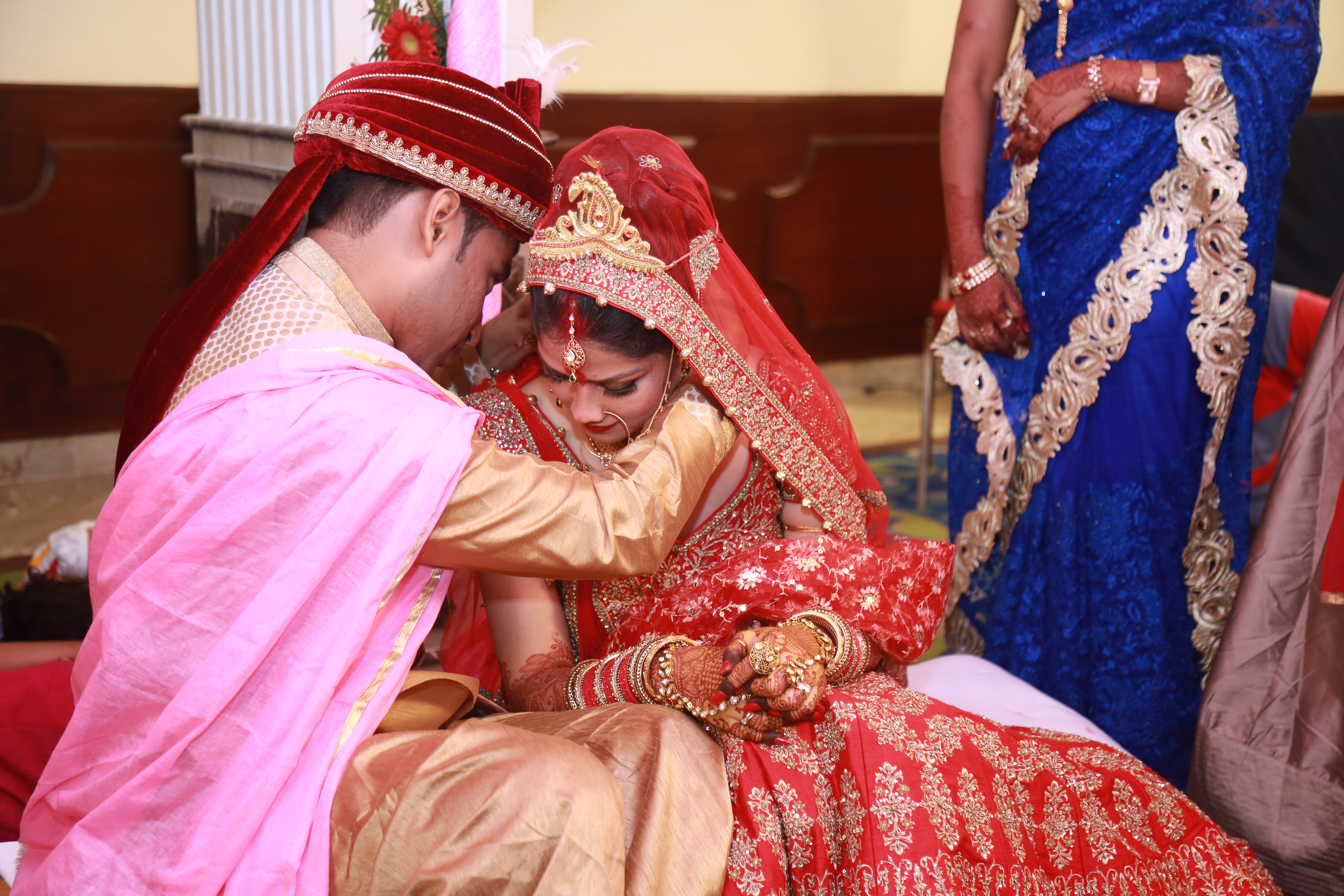
The sacred ceremony of tying the mangala sutra, in a North Indian wedding.

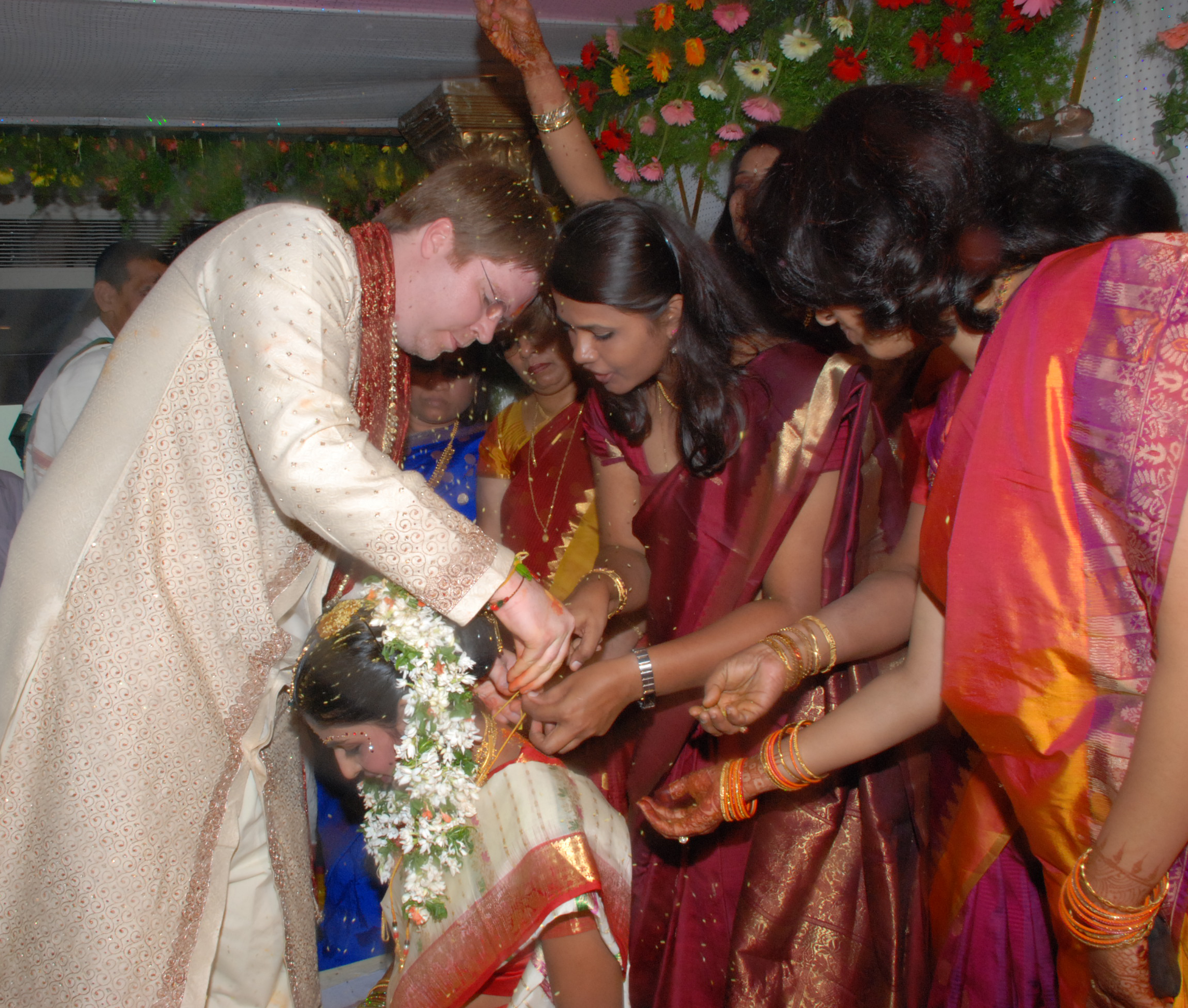
Tying of the mangala sutra in a Telugu mixed marriage.

== History ==
The mangala sutra's origin dates back to the 4th century CE, referred to as the mangalya sutra in the Lalita Sahasranama, and the Purananuru, a Sangam text, mentions a sacred marriage tali upon Ay country women neck. It also finds a mention in the 6th century CE as a single yellow thread that was tied around the bride for protection from other men and evil spirits.

The concept of mangala sutra has evolved over centuries, and has become an integral part of marriages among several Indian communities. Historian of Indian jewellery, Usha Balakrishnan, explains that the mangala sutra had previously referred to a literal thread as opposed to an item of jewellery.

The significance of the mangala sutra is described by Adi Shankara in the Soundarya Lahari. According to Hindu tradition, the mangala sutra is worn for the long life of the husband. As told by religious customs and social expectations, married women should wear mangala sutra throughout their life as it is believed that the practice enhances the well-being of her husband. Bridal jewellery in ancient times also worked as a financial security against old age and widowhood, even though women did have property rights.

There are many communities in India among whom the mangala sutra seems to be absent, and other forms of marital tokens are traditional. For example, in large parts of North India, vermillion on hair parting (sindoor), toe rings (bichiya), and glass bangles indicate the marital status of a woman. Such as the chooras of the Punjabis or the shaka pola of the Bengalis, a pair of shell and red coral bangles. In Kashmir, Pandit women receive a pair of dejhoor upon their wedding, an ear pendant whose shape can change according to the families, the clans, or the regions of the valley.

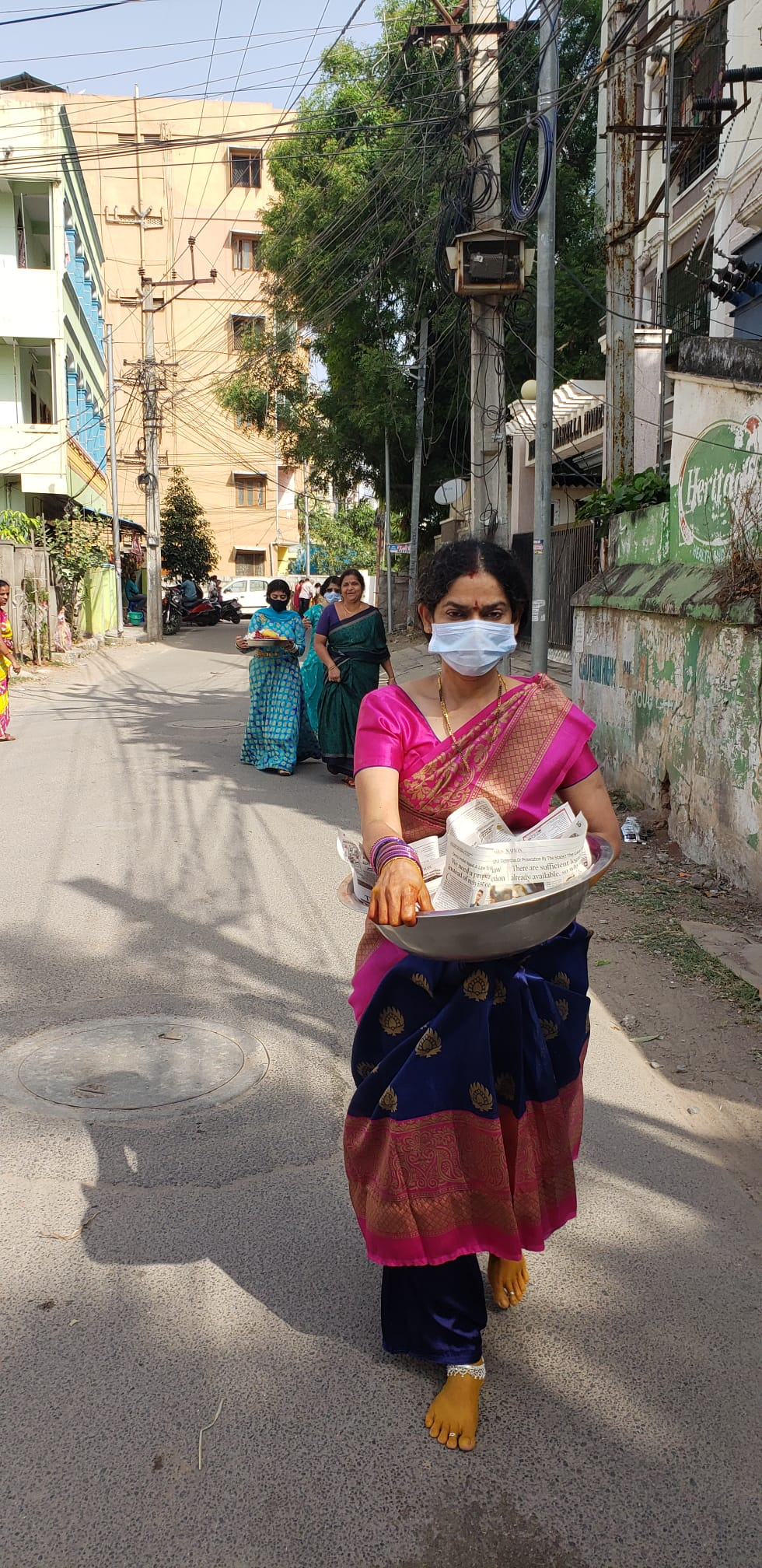
Married Telugu women on the occasion of Kailasa Gowri Nommu. A fast where rituals are conducted on mangalasutras.

Conversely, certain non-Hindu religious groups also wear nuptial chains akin to the mangala sutra, such as Syrian Christians (Eastern Christians), Tamil Jains (also known as the Nainars), the Mappilas of Kerala, and the Dakhnis of Hyderabad (Muslims). Such necklaces were also used among Indian Jews of the Konkan (the Bene Israel) and of Cochin (both Malabaris and Paradesis). The practices associated with these mangala sutras may be similar to those observed in Hindu contexts, while differing in their ritual significance. The tying of the necklace by the groom and its wearing throughout married life constitute common features, though certain variations exist. The transmission of the ornament may occur between the mother-in-law and the daughter-in-law in some Muslim communities, or between the sister-in-law and the wife among Cochin Jews.

== Designs ==
Mangala sutras are made in a variety of designs. The common ones are the Lakshmi tali worn by the Telugus of Telangana and Andhra Pradesh, which contain images of Lakshmi, the goddess of auspiciousness, ela tali or minnu worn by the Malayalees of Kerala, and the Kumbha tali worn by the Tamils of the Kshatriya caste in Tamil Nadu. The design is chosen by the groom's family according to prevalent customs. Gujaratis and Marwaris from Rajasthan often use a diamond pendant in a gold chain, which is merely ornamental in nature and is not a substitute for the mangala sutra in the traditional sense. Marathis of Maharashtra wear a pendant of two vati ornaments shaped like tiny bowls. The mangala sutra of the Kannadigas of Karnataka is similar to that of the Marathis, except that it usually has one vati. Nowadays, many fashion-conscious families opt for lighter versions, with a single vati or a more contemporary style.

Konkani people (Goans, Mangaloreans, Bombay East Indians and others, including Hindus) wear three necklaces around their necks, referred to as dharemani or muhurtmani (big golden bead), mangalasutra with one or two gold discs and kasitali with gold and coral beads. In Andhra Pradesh and Telangana, the two coin-sized gold discs are separated by 2-3 beads of different kinds. By tradition, one disc comes from the bride's family and another from the groom's side.

Mangalsutras forms can also vary depending on the religions. As the minnu, a pendant worn by Saint Thomas Christian women, featuring a cross, or the kali poath (also spelled kali poth or kalipoth ka laccha), worn by Deccani Muslim women, characterized by its distinctive arrangement of black beads.

== Gallery ==
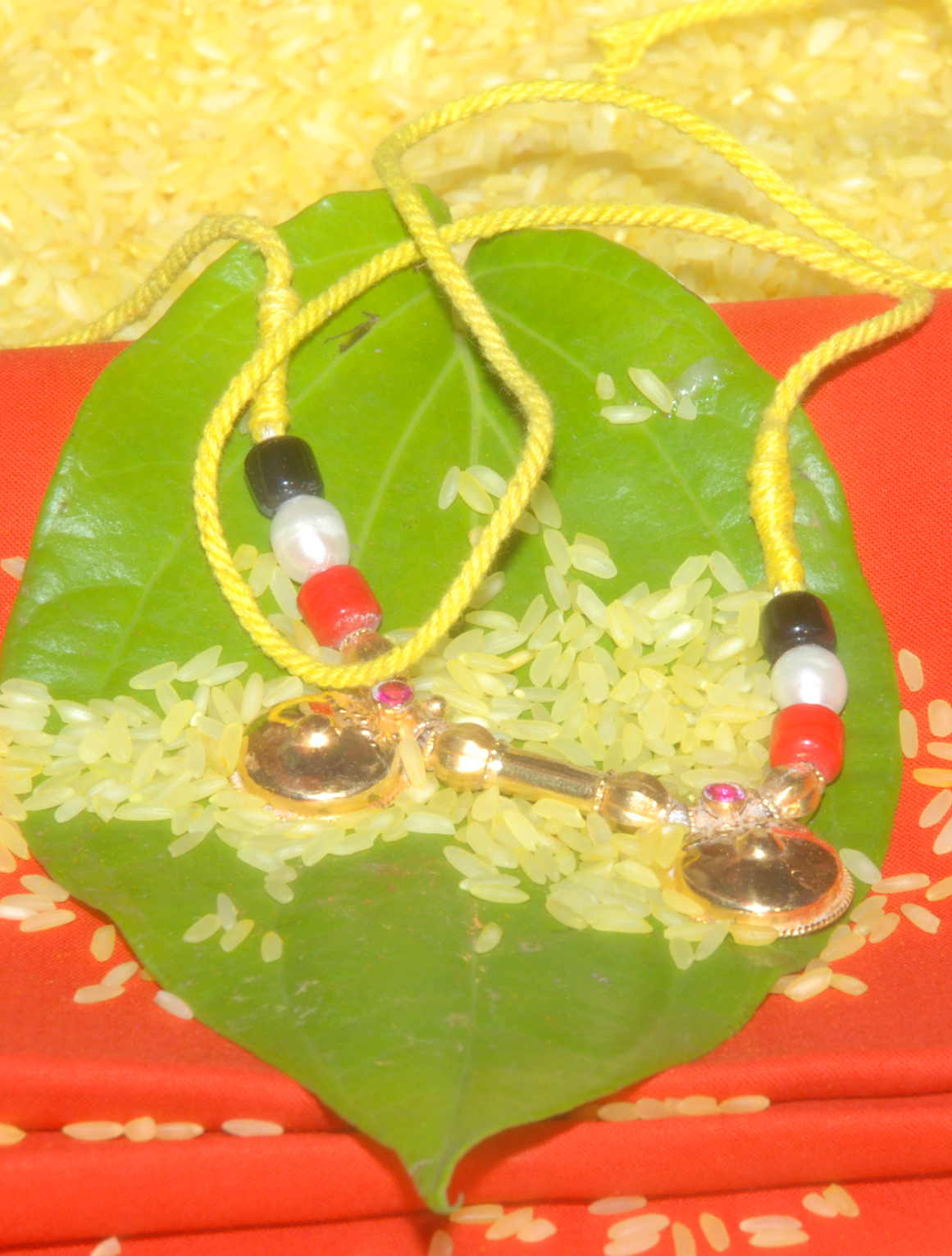
A traditional Andhraite mangalasutra displayed on a betel leaf, smeared with turmeric.

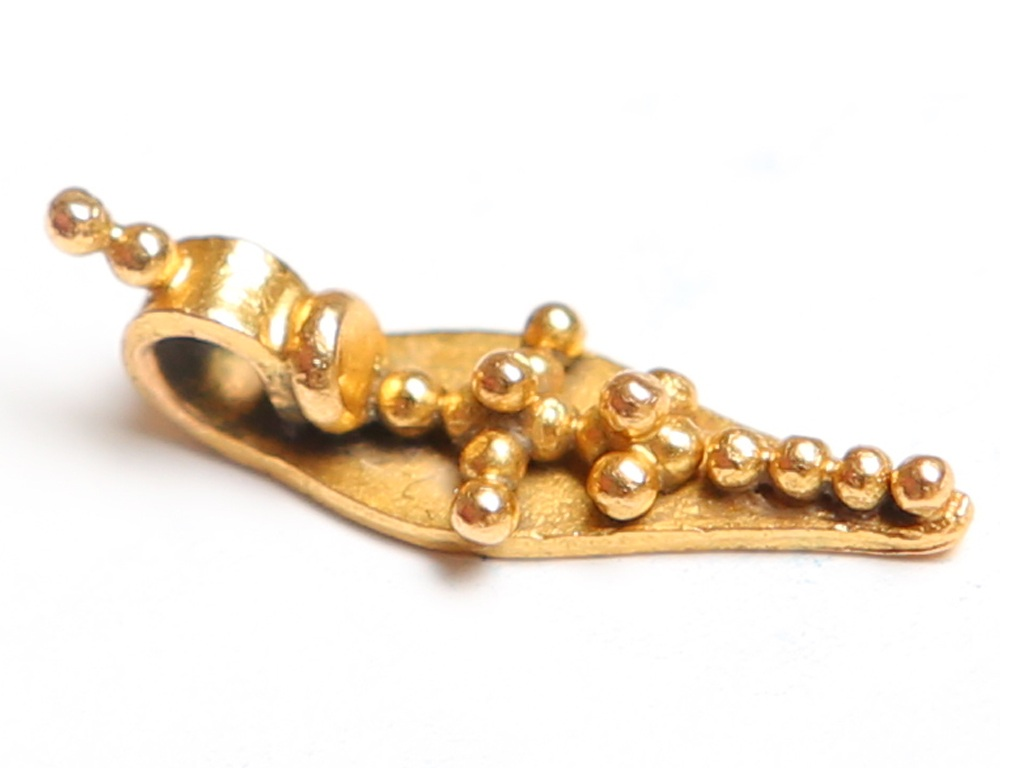
A minnu, pendant of the Saint Thomas Christians mangalasutra, with a cross of 21 beads.

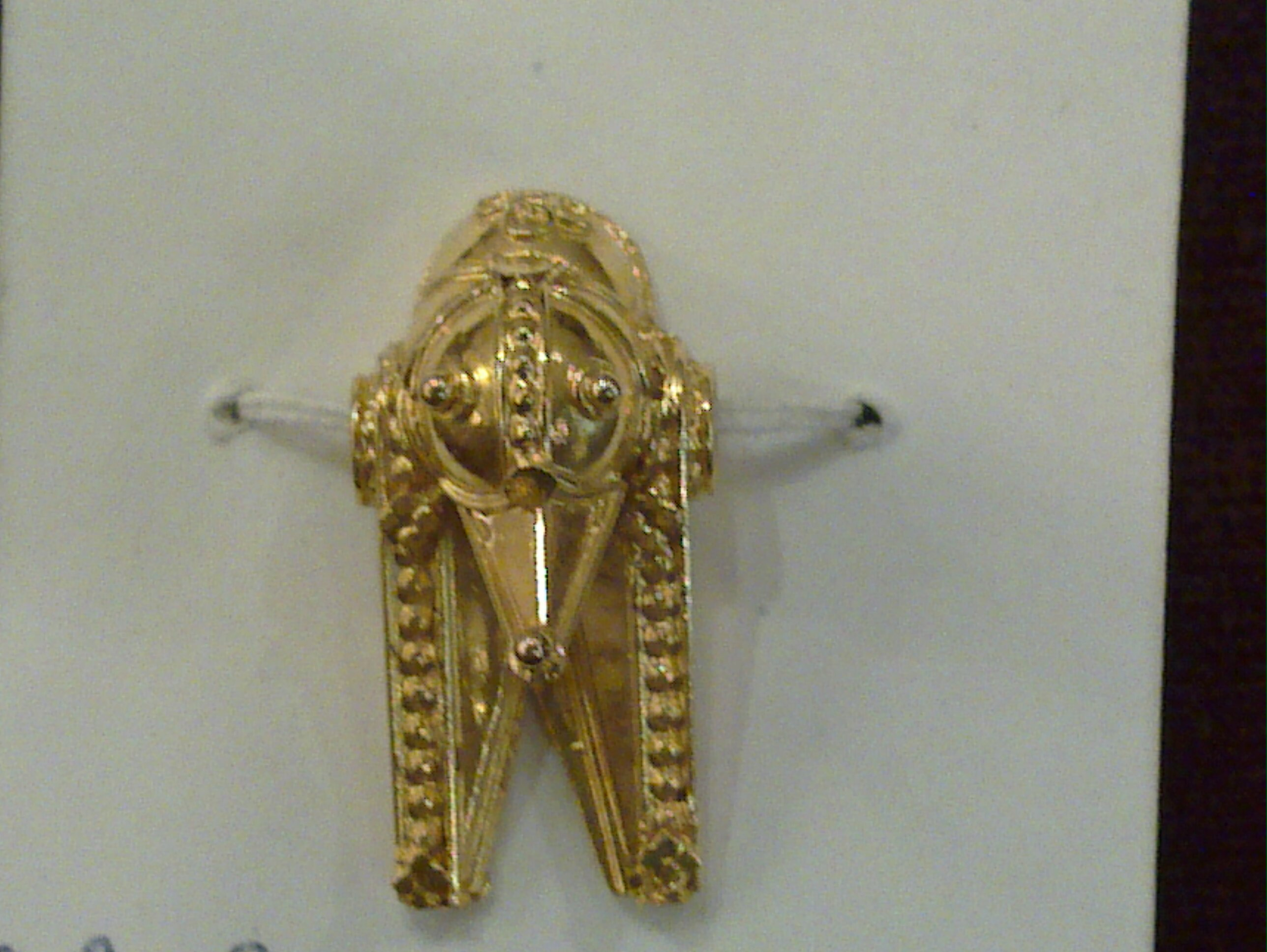
A Pillaiyar Thali, or Ganesha pendant, used for mangala sutras from Tamil Nadu.

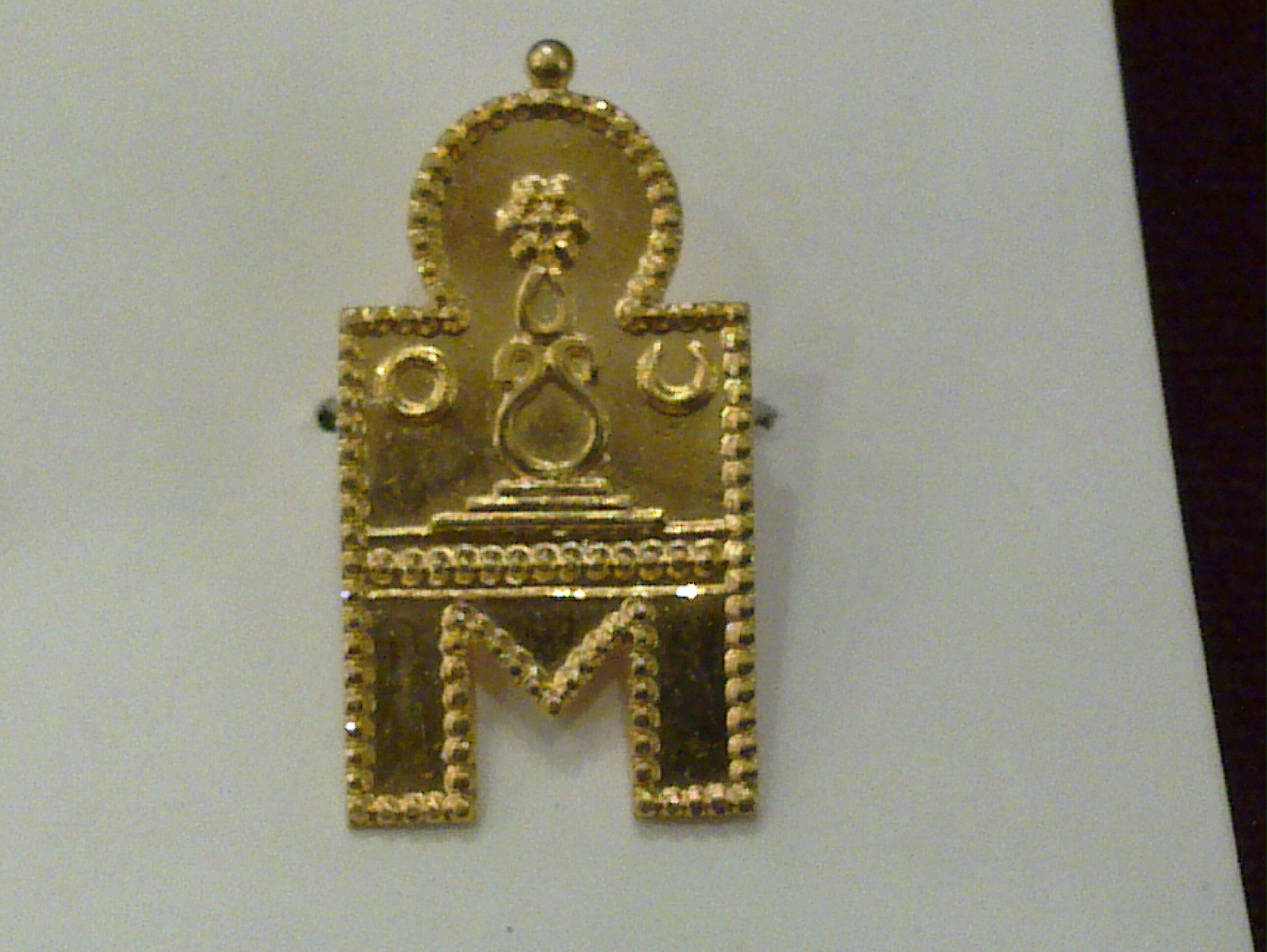
A thamarai thali, or Lotus pendant, used for mangala sutras from Tamil Nadu.

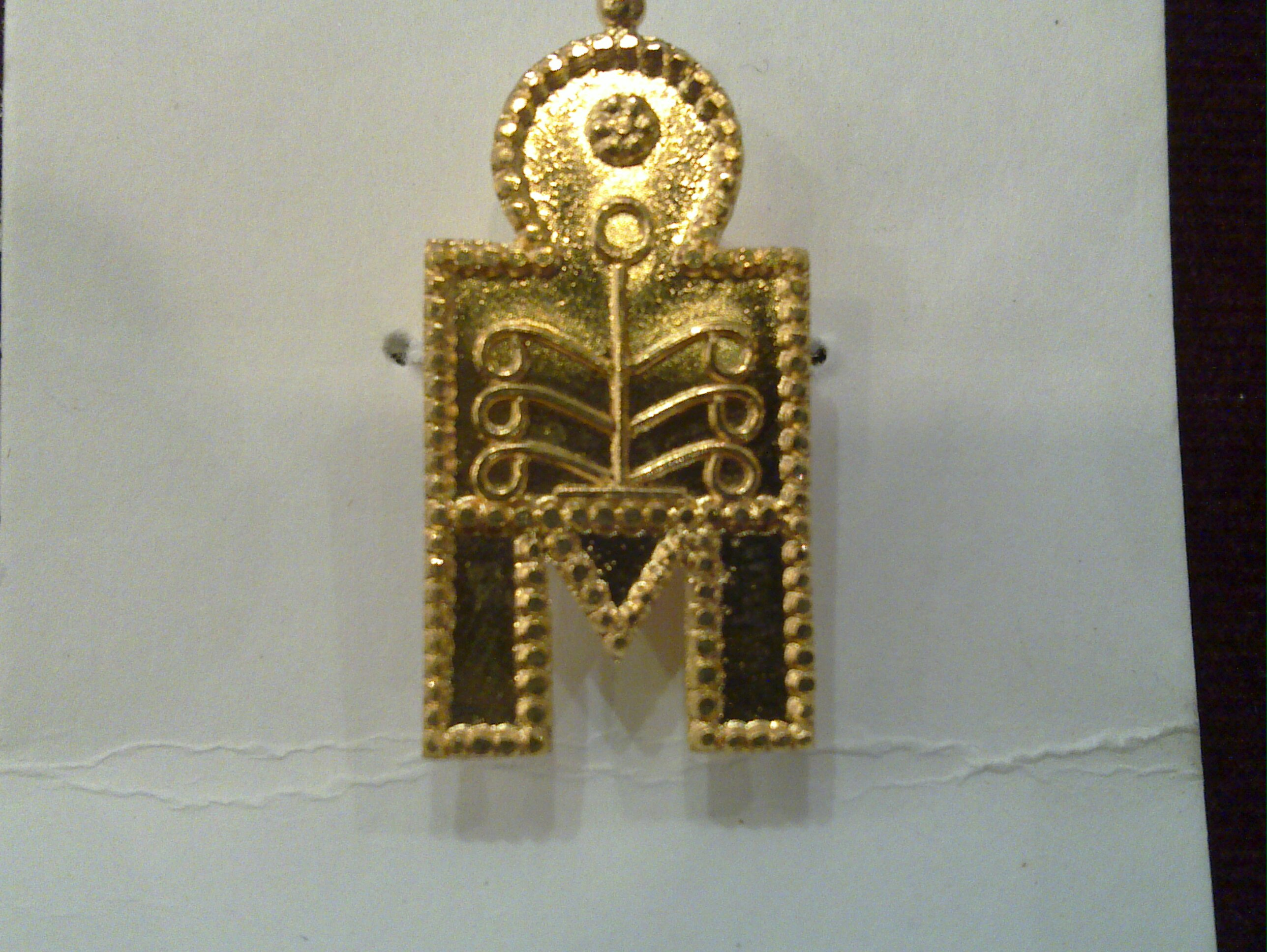
A thennaimara thali, or Coconut tree pendant, used for mangala sutras from Tamil Nadu.

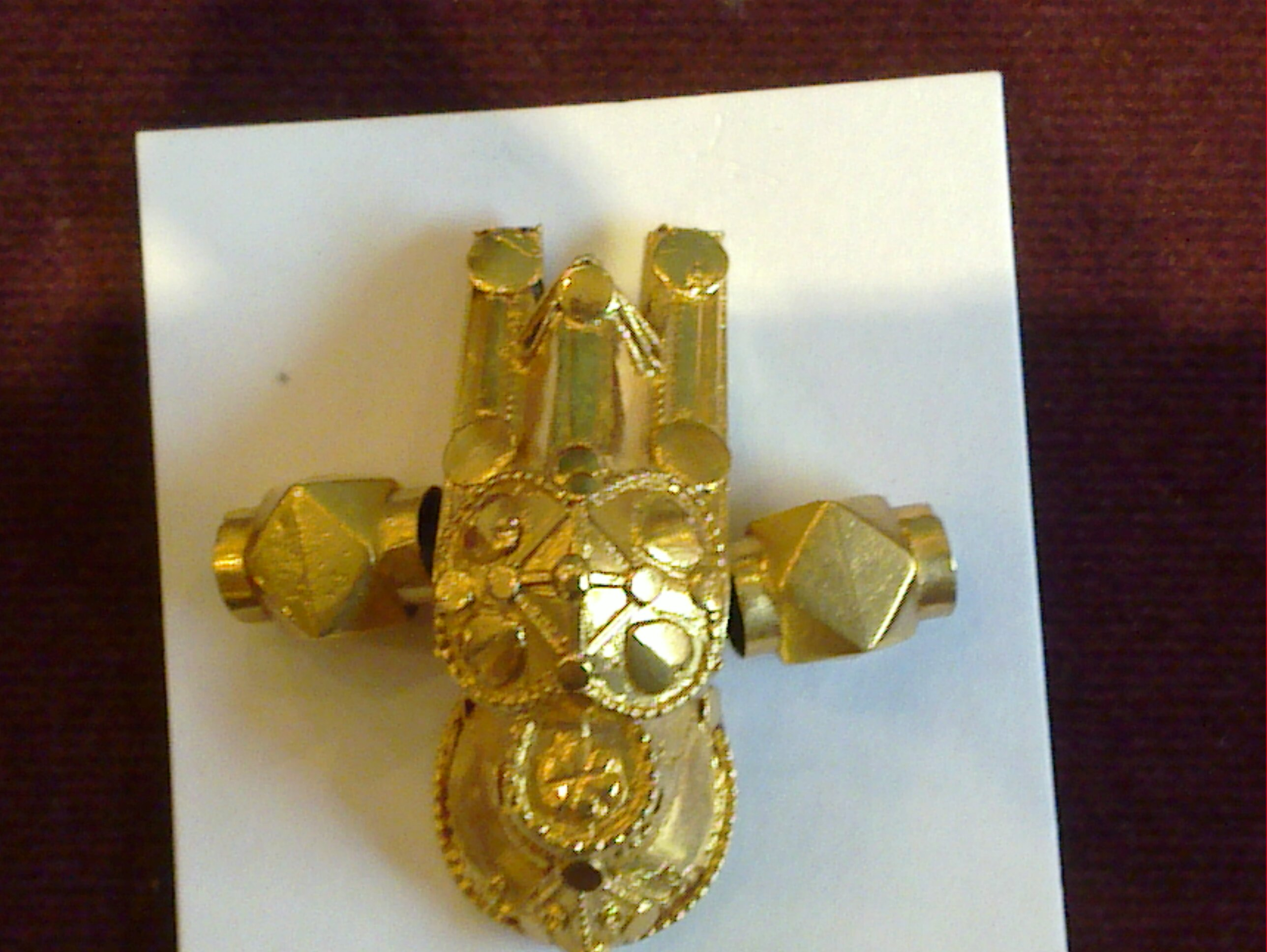
A mangala sutra pendant peculiar to the Gounder community.

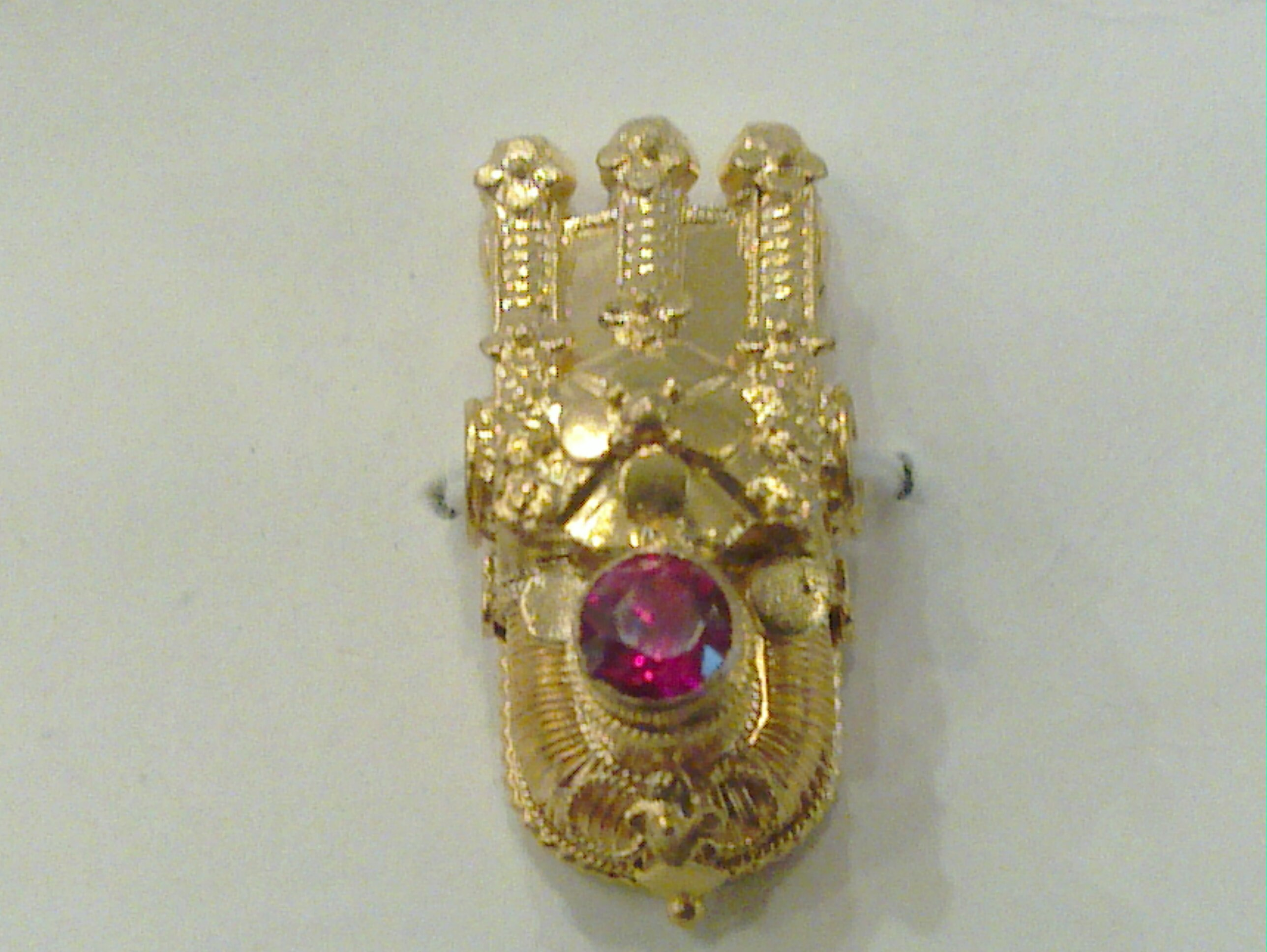
A mangala sutra pendant peculiar to the Vanniyar community.

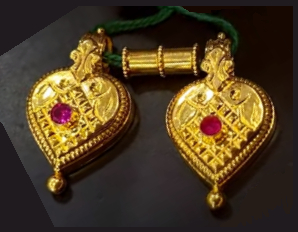
A mangala sutra pendant peculiar to the Tamil Nadu Vokkaligas.

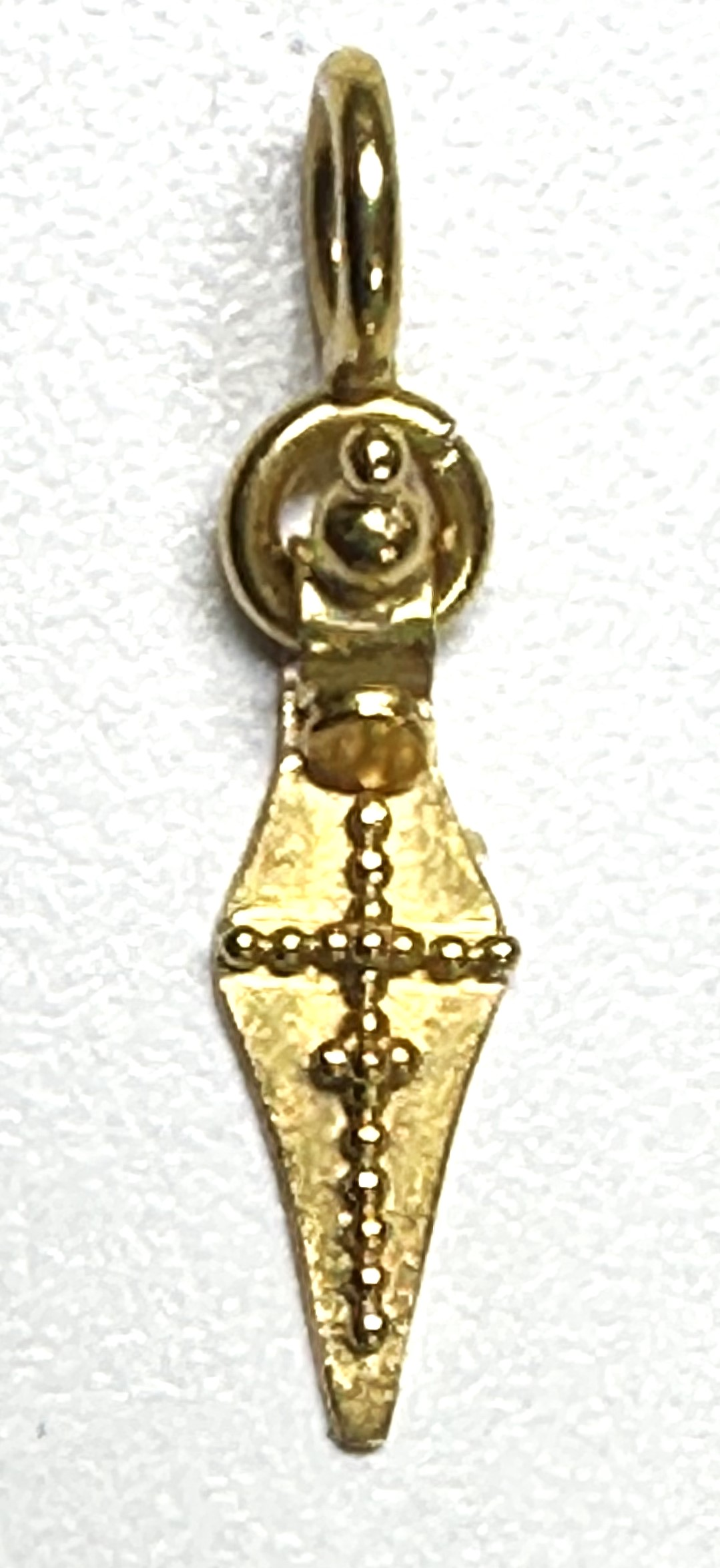
A mangala sutra pendant peculiar to the Knanayas.

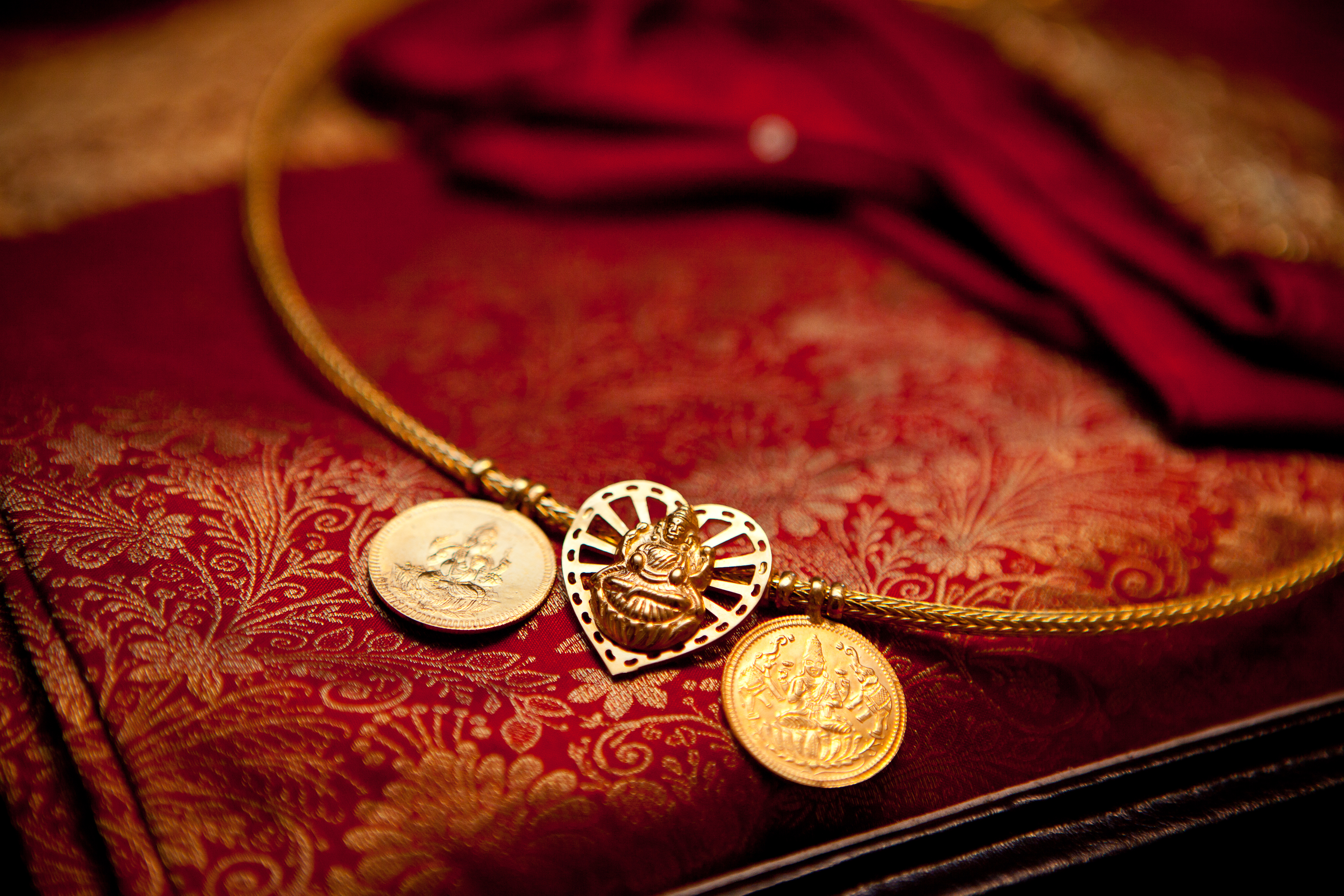
An Amman thali kodi, a Shakti-based Sri Lankan Tamil mangala sutra.

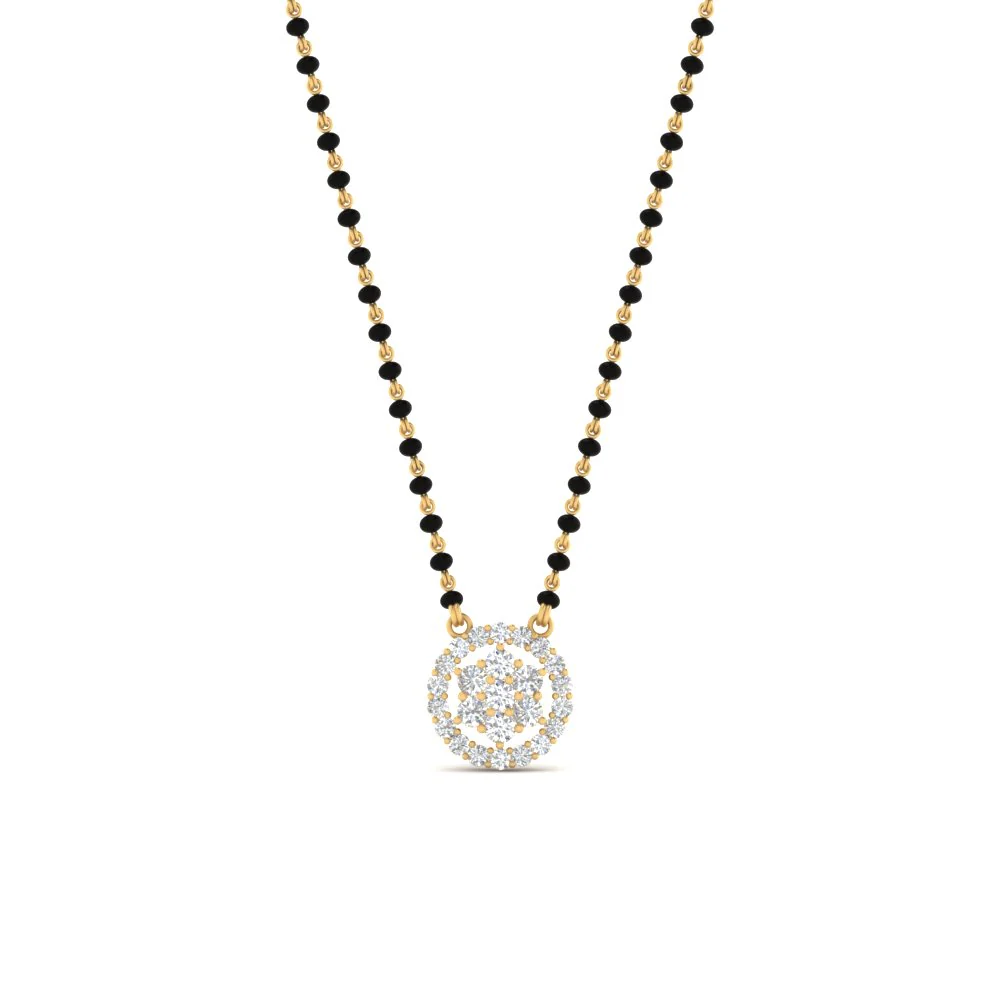
Modern mangalsutra with a diamond covered fancy pendant.

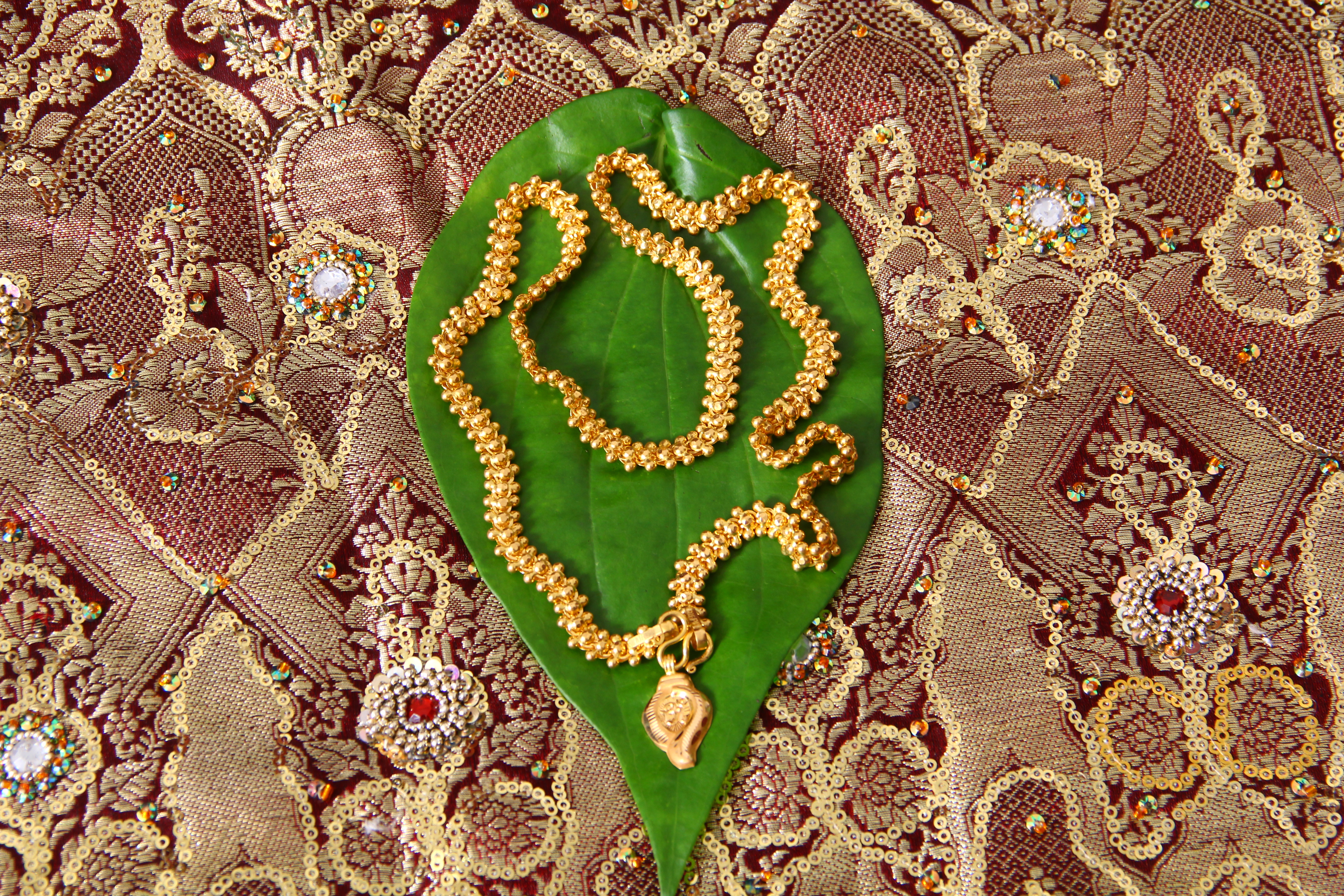
An Ela thali, a Keralite mangalsutra with a leaf-shaped pendant.

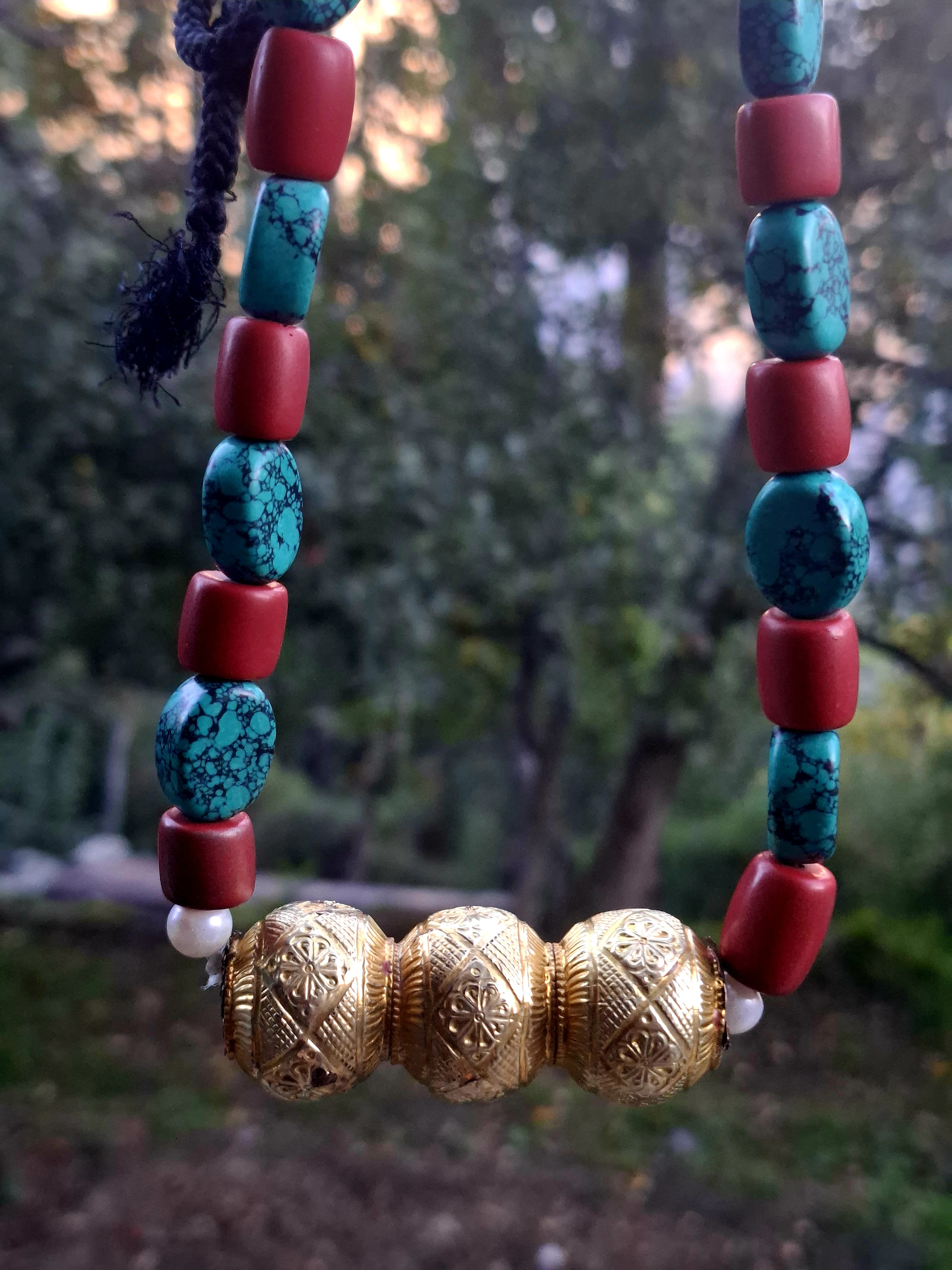
A Tarmani, or Trimani, is a nuptial chain worn among the Kinnauris.

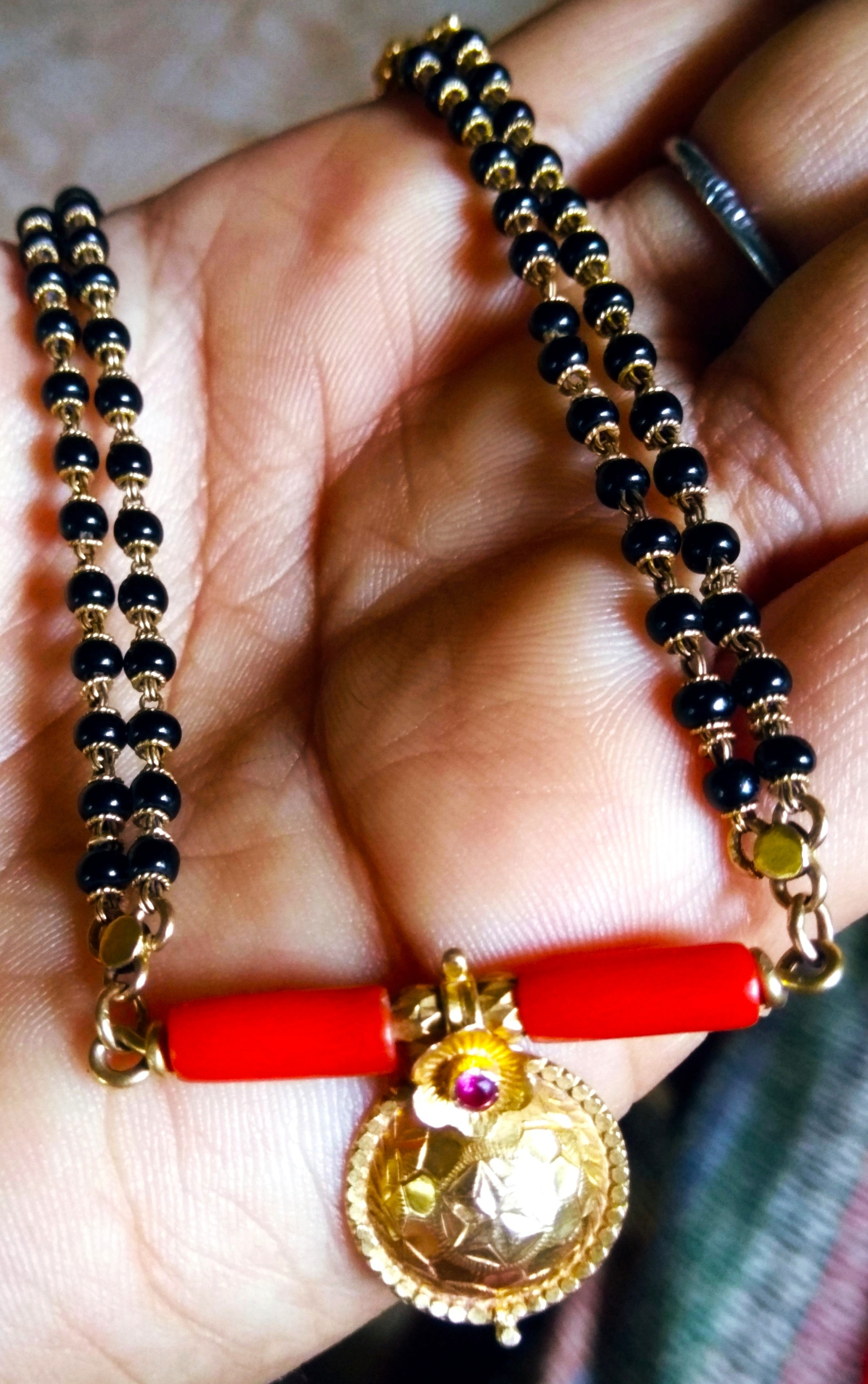
A Canarese model of mangala sutra, with one disk pendant.

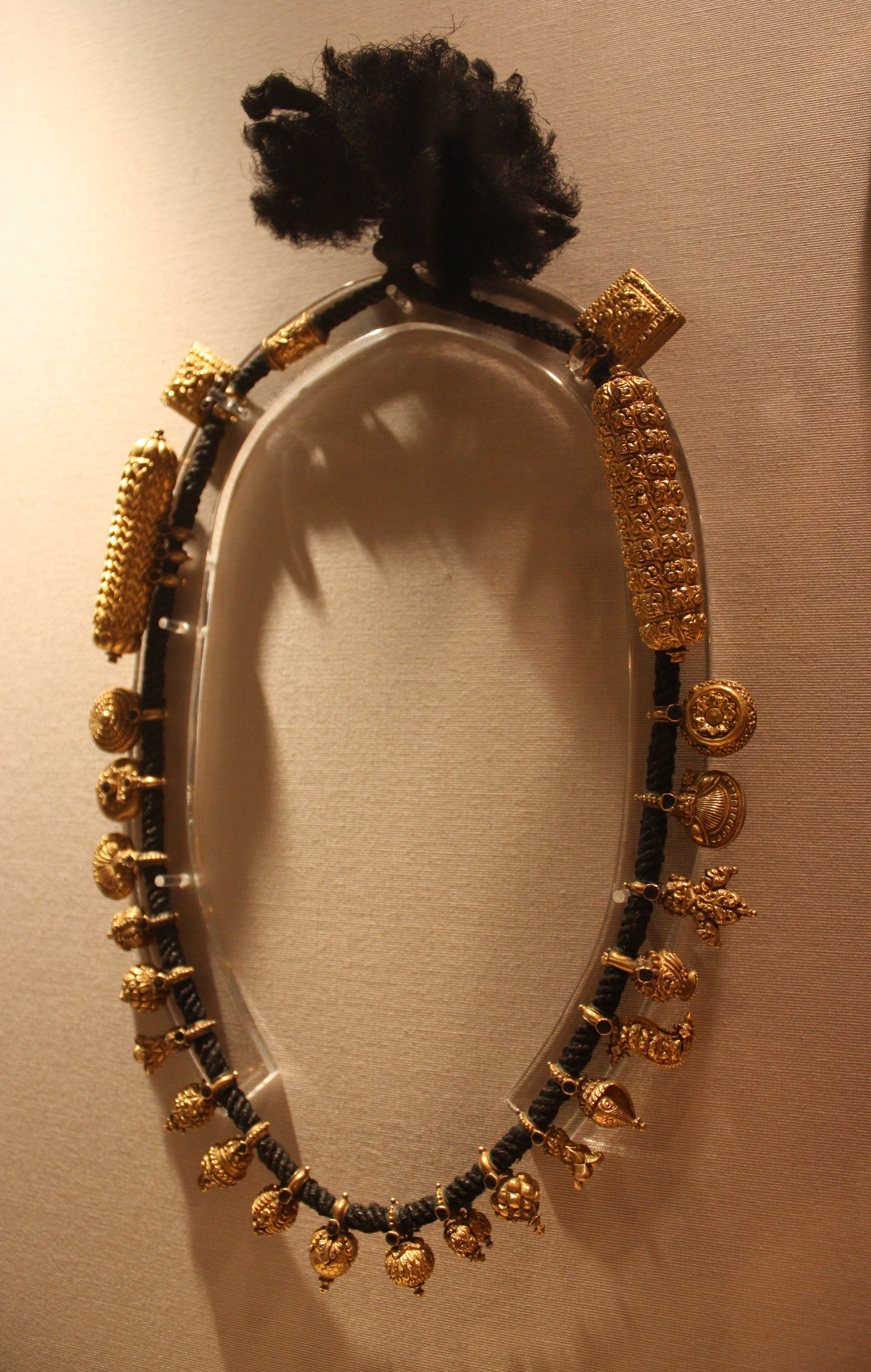
A mangalasutra from the 19th century, produced in Madurai.

== See also ==
- Hindu wedding
- Sindoor
- Karva Chauth
- Pativrata
