= Anklet =

Ornament worn around the ankle

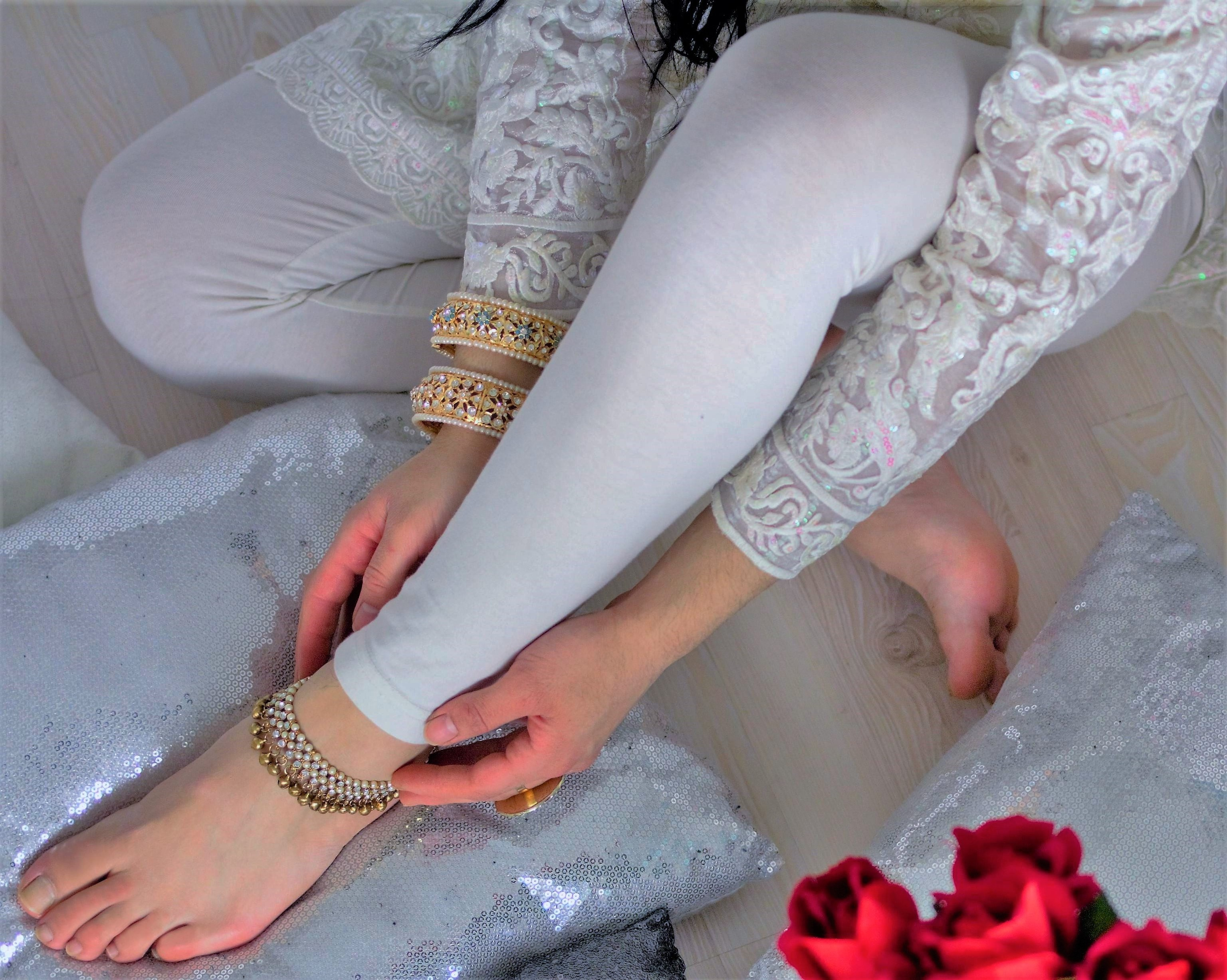
An anklet on female feet

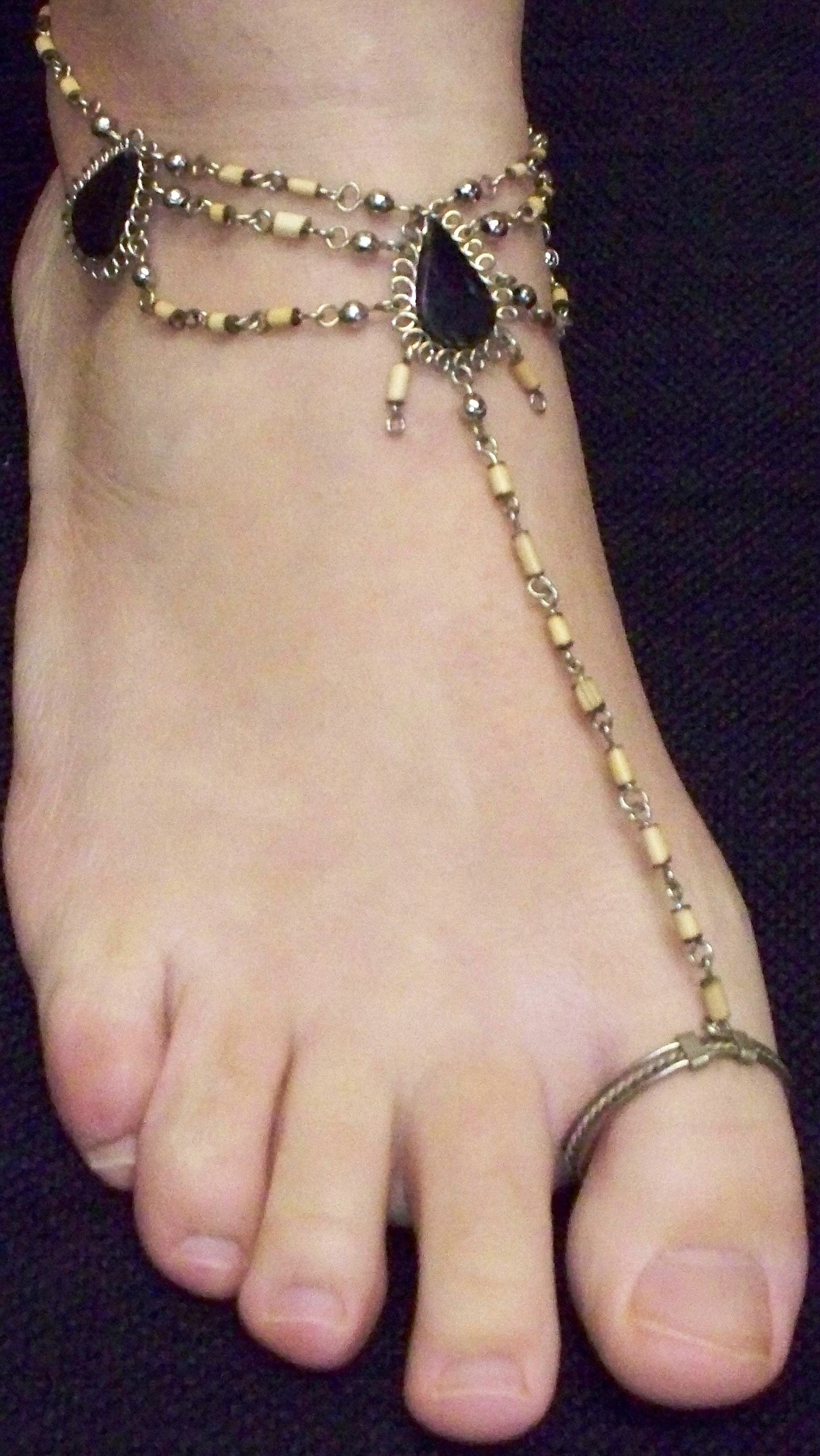
A toe ring with attached anklet

An anklet, also called ankle chain, ankle bracelet or ankle string, is an ornament worn around the ankle. Barefoot anklets and toe rings historically have been worn for at least over 8,000 years by girls and women in Indus Valley, in Indian subcontinent where it is commonly known as pattilu, payal, golusu and sometimes as nupur. They have also been worn by Egyptian women since predynastic times. In the United States both casual and more formal anklets became fashionable from the 1930s to the late–20th century. While in Western popular culture both younger men and women may wear casual leather anklets, they are popular among barefoot women. Formal anklets (of silver, gold, or beads) are used by some women as fashion jewellery. Anklets are an important piece of jewellery in South Asian marriages, worn along with saris.

Occasionally, anklets on both ankles are joined by a chain to limit the step. This practice was once prevalent in Southeast Asia, where the effect was to give a "feminine" short tripping step. Today, a few Western women follow this practice, but rarely in public. More rarely still, some people wear "permanent" (e.g., soldered) ankle chains and even connecting chains.

== History ==
=== Egypt ===
Anklets were worn as an everyday ornament by Egyptian women of all social classes in ancient Egypt from as early as predynastic times. The name for anklets was not much different from that of bracelets being menefret (mnfrt) except by adding a phrase to denote connection to the feet. They were made of different metals and in multiple shapes, with more expensive metals like gold being more common among the rich, while less expensive ones like silver and iron more common among lower social classes. During the fourth, fifth, and sixth dynasties, anklets were usually made of beads threaded in several rows held together with spacer-bars. Anklets were also worn by dancers like those shown in the tombs of Kagemni, Ti, and Akh-hotp.

In the early–20th century, anklets were commonly worn by Egyptian women of inner cities. They were called kholkhal (pl. khalakheel) and were most commonly worn by women of Alexandria, along with a traditional dress covered by a one-piece black cloth called melaya leff.

Today, anklets are not commonly worn by Egyptian women in public due to increased Islamic conservatism that has spread in Egypt where wearing anklets in public is generally perceived as being immodest. Anklets are still commonly worn by dancers in public events.

=== Europe ===
Bronze anklets are visible as early as the Bronze Age in temperate Europe, in an area roughly along the Danube, in the Alpine foreland, up the Rhine to the Atlantic, and also down the Rhône (Sherratt, 2001). These were found among hoards in these areas, along with other bronze items characteristic of this time (c. 1800 BCE onwards), and are attributable to the Tumulus culture that spread across this region.

Periscelis (Ancient Greek: περισκελίς), was an anklet worn by ancient Greek and Roman women. The plebeian women wore anklets of silver, whereas the patricians of gold.

=== South Asia ===
Neolithic and Chalcolithic periods at Mehrgarh indicate use of anklets. Jhon Marshall describes dancing girl statue as being adorned with armlets, bangles, and anklets A first-century CE epic of Tamil literature called Silappatikaram (The Story of the Anklet) dealt with a woman whose husband was killed while trying to sell one of her ruby anklets to a dishonest goldsmith. The anklets are described in great detail in the poem.

Rajasthani women wear the heaviest type of anklets, which are silver and signify tribal adherence. The women wear these as costume jewelry, but also to show their bravery as a tribe against other rival tribes. The fashion for heavy anklets is declining in India, but is still common in rural areas.

In the eastern Indian state of Odisha, which is known for its traditional jewelry, there are varieties of anklets known as Paunji Nupur, which are worn by women. Another variety, which covers the entire foot, is known as "padapadma". In ancient times men also wore anklets. Traditionally, only Kshatriya (royal/warrior caste) persons can wear gold anklets, and other castes wear silver anklets.

The word "payal" (payalak) and "jhanjar" are words for the anklet in Hindi, Urdu and Punjabi respectively.

In Bengali language anklet is called "nupur" and widely worn in the Bengal region – eastern Indian state of West Bengal and Republic of Bangladesh.

In Eastern cultures, particularly India, anklets are worn on either or both ankles.

In Sri Lanka, The dancers wear anklets. Anklets are worn on both ankles.

In Pakistan, anklets are typically worn by younger women in the Regions on Punjab and Sindh, often with little bells that make chimming sounds, also called ghungroos.

== As an ornament ==
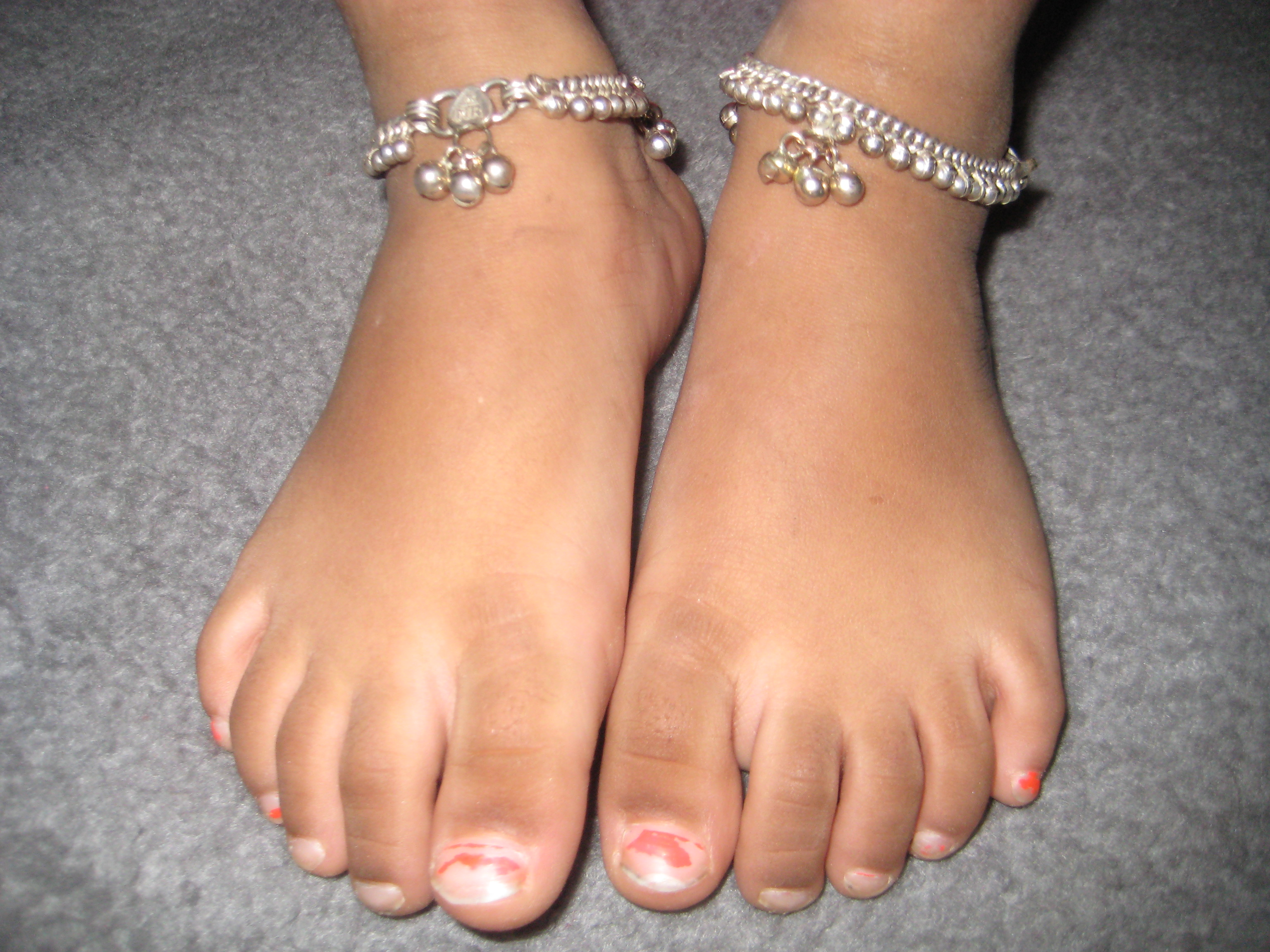

Anklets can be made of silver, gold, and other less precious metals as well as leather, plastic, nylon and other such materials.

Metal anklets are of two types: "flexible" and "inflexible". Flexible anklets, often called payal, pazeb or jhanjhar in India and Pakistan, are made by tying links in a chain. Subsequently, sonorous bells can be attached to the chain, so that the wearer can make pleasing sounds while walking. Inflexible anklet are usually created by shaping flat metal sheet to the ankle.

== Bells ==
Salangai or ghunghru are small bells that Bharatanatyam, Kathak, Kuchipudi, and Odissi dancers tie around their ankles.

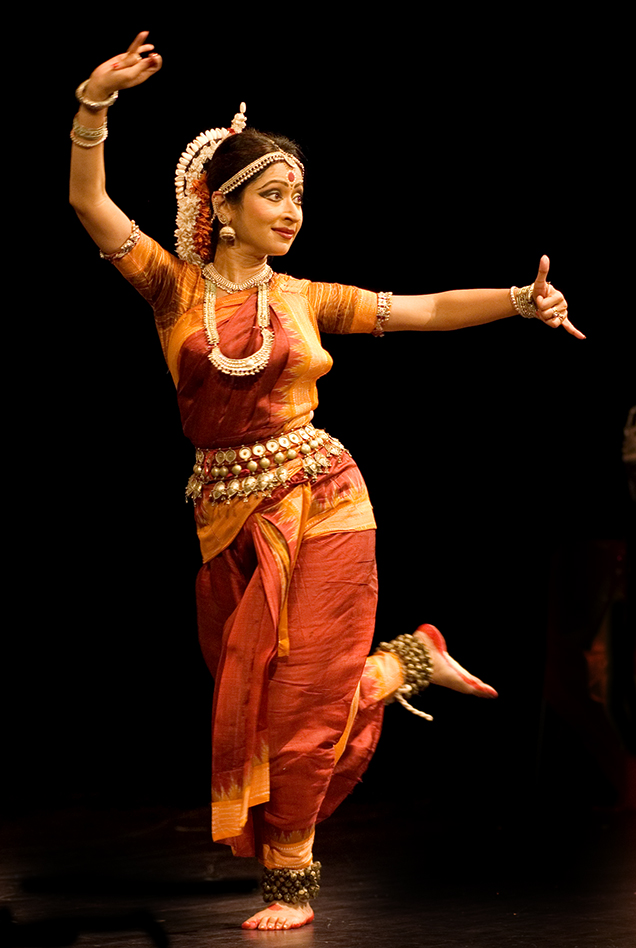
A dancer performing an Indian classical dance: Odissi

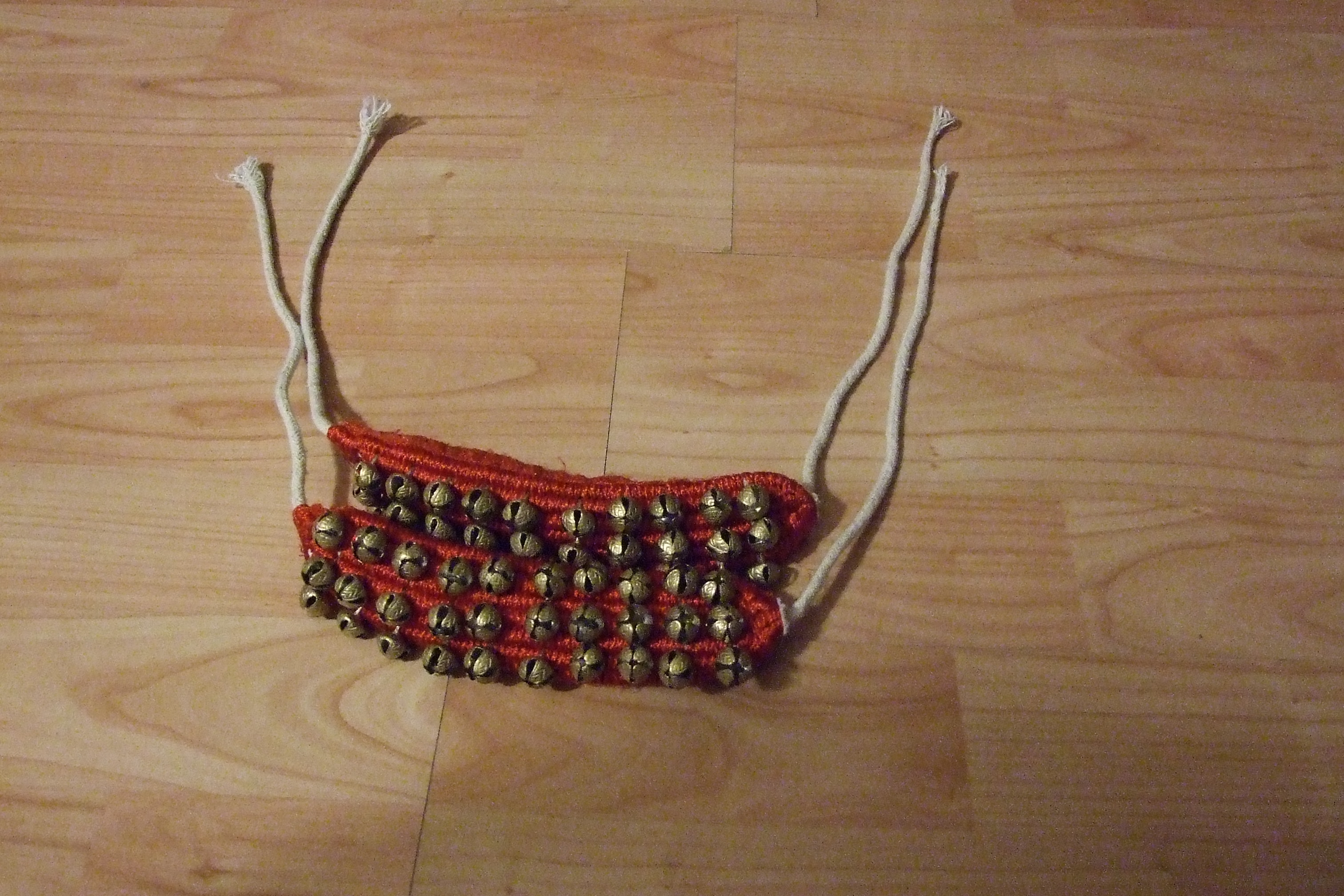
A pair of ghunghru, a musical accessory

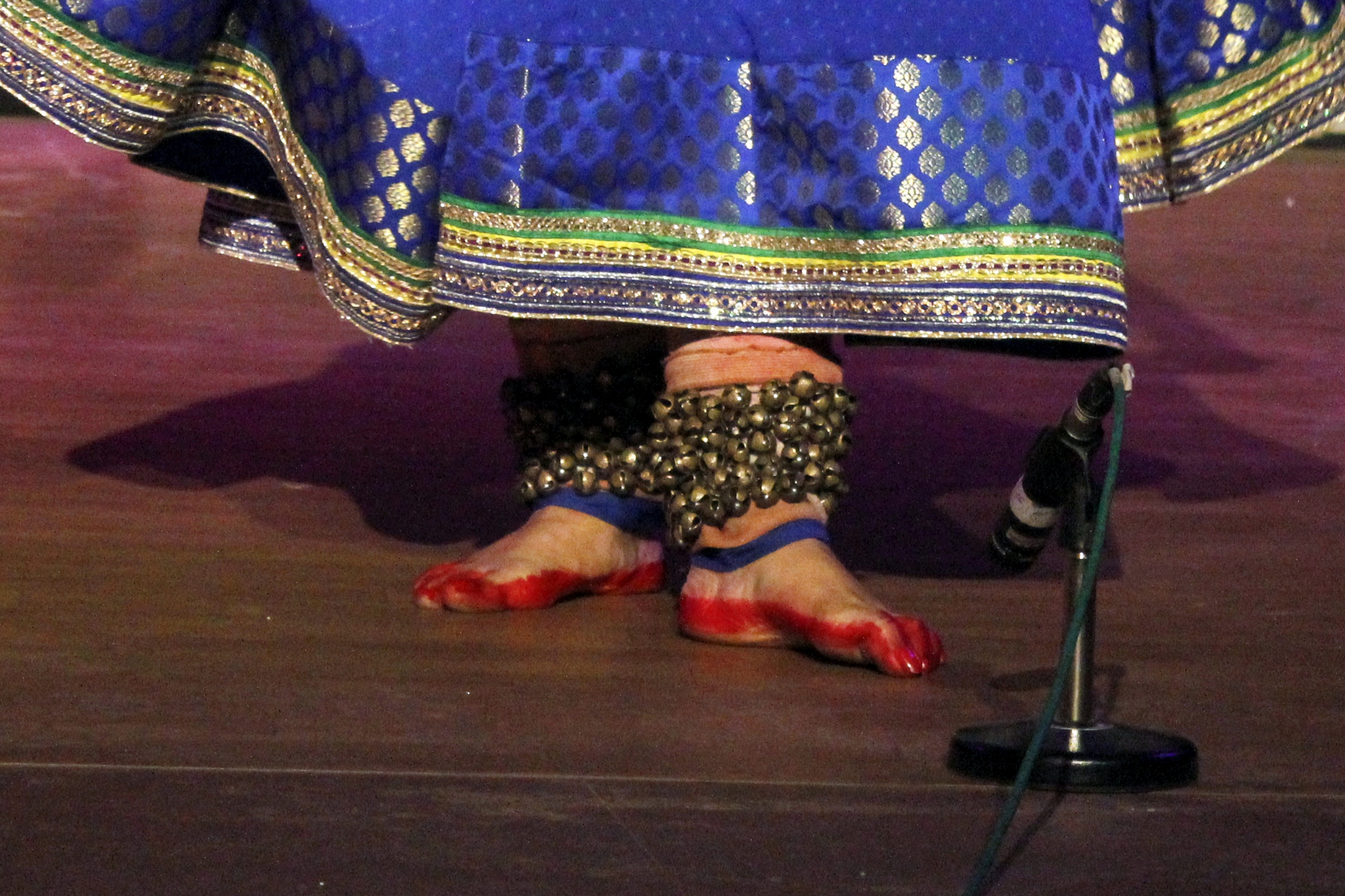
Kathak Solo Performance

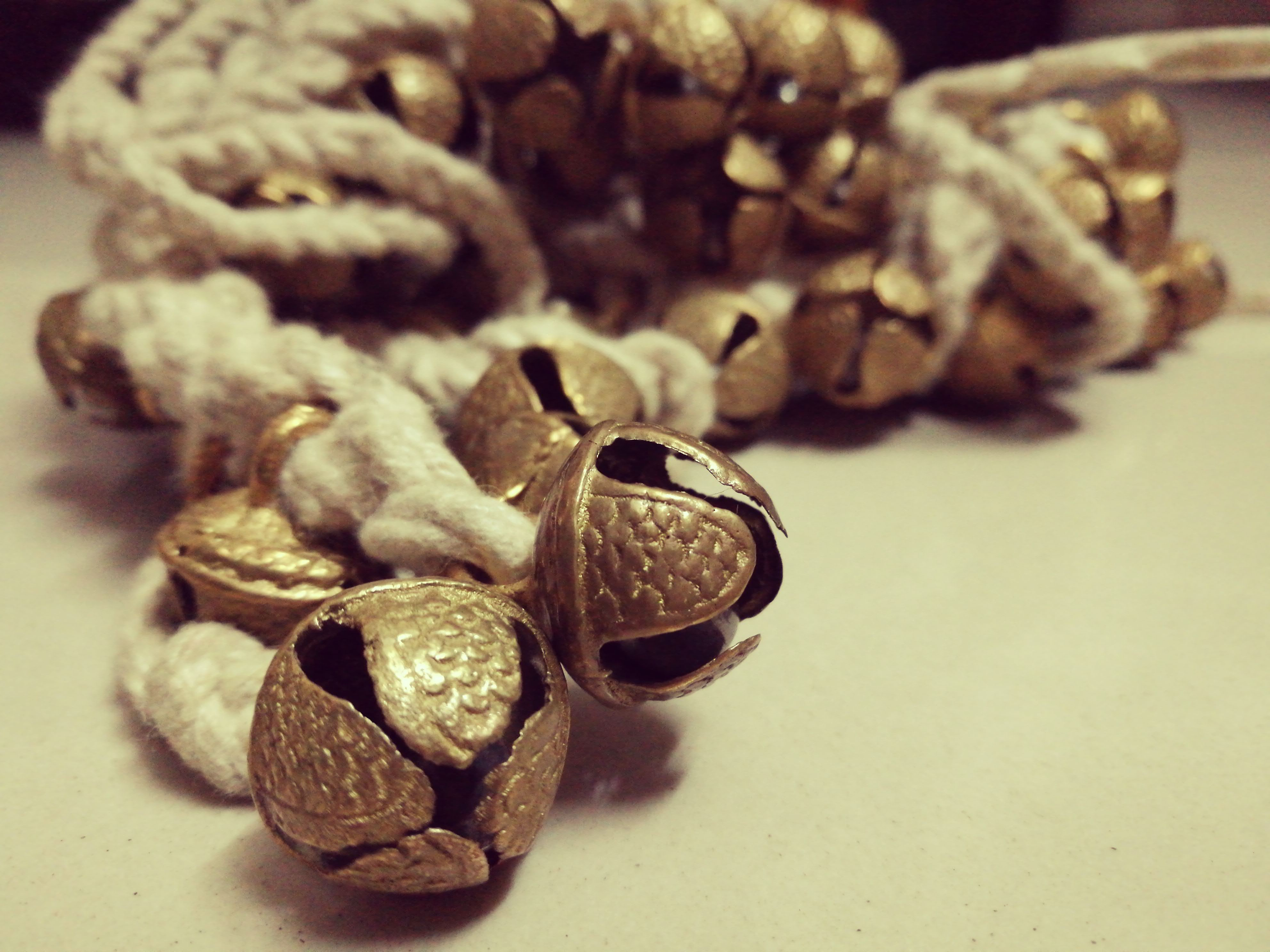
A set of Ghunghru, with small bells

== Other anklets ==
Scuba divers sometimes wear lead anklets to stop a tendency for their legs to float up when diving in a drysuit. Convicted criminals may wear ankle monitors as electronic tagging devices while being confined to a specific venue.

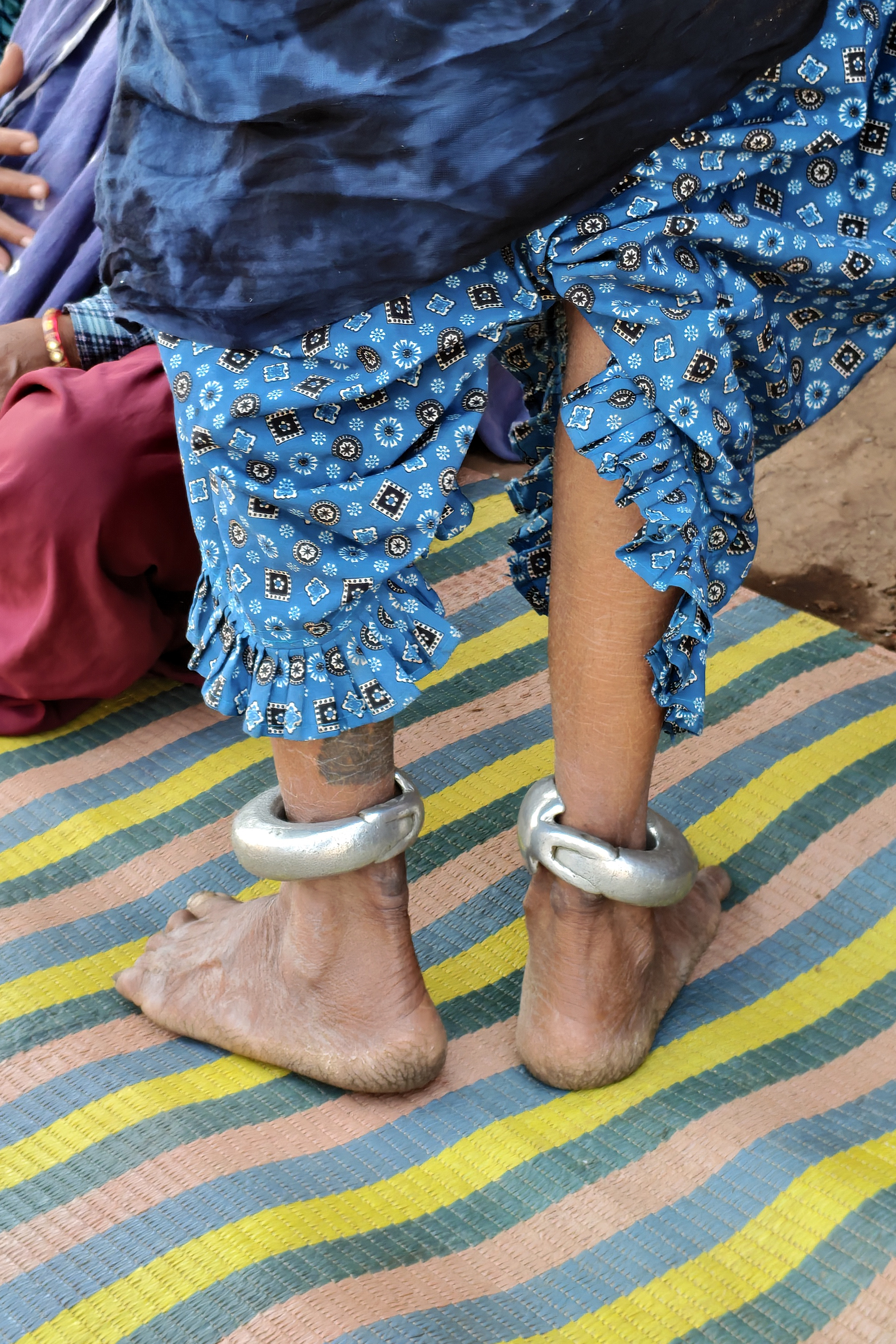
Bhil community women wearing traditional silver anklets in Jhabua

== See also ==
- Ankle monitor
- Bangle
