= Visual markers of marital status =

Ways to show marital status in various cultures

Visual markers of marital status may include clothing, hairstyle, accessories, jewelry, tattoos, and other bodily adornments. The term comes from sociology, where visual markers are taken to mean all perceivable signs or indicators, not just those visible to the eye. In anthropology the term cultural artefact has a similar meaning particular to symbolic objects; wedding rings for example, are cultural artefacts. Markers of marital status that are not "visible", such as expectations of behavior, are possible as well. Markers might also include culturally exclusive privileges, roles, and responsibilities. For example, in the past, Morris dancing was historically performed by married men. Marital status markers are often gender-specific. Markers of marital status are generally perceivably unique, but this too isn't a necessity. For example, the bindi of South Asian origin is traditionally a symbol of married women, while the tilaka is gender neutral, has less direct association with marital status. As culture evolves and changes, it is not unheard of, even for bindis to be utilized by women of all ages and marital status.

Visual markers of marital status are important to distinguish from other traditional symbols found at weddings, like the aforementioned tilaka, because they indicate information of cultural significance about the bearer; information that is often implicitly understood by the community at large. In many cultures, married people enjoy special privileges or are addressed differently by members of the community. Therefore, many symbols of martial status impart culturally specific social status.

Human mating strategies can be socially risky for the participants. The actor and the subject are both at risk of embarrassment or cultural judgements. For the actor, rejection can be emotionally painful. For married individuals dealing with extramarital advances, there is the potential harm to a marriage itself, typically from a loss of trust capital within the family, or from the wider community. This applies to both the subjects of unwanted attention in the passive role, and to would-be adulterers in the active or passive roles. By communicating marital status visibly, married individuals can prevent awkward, unwanted advances; or failing that, demonstrate evidence of unwillingness post hoc. Where matchmaking is culturally prevalent, the social status of a matchmaker is also tied into the equation, and they too depend on understanding the cultural forms of marital status communication.

Visual markers of marital status also have a role in social bonding. They can also increase the bearer's sense of belongingness and cultural inclusion. Visible markers of Marital Status are often symbolic of cooperation and reciprocity. Ultimately, these symbols have an impact on a person's place in society in many different ways.

== Husband ==
Male marital status markers are usually less elaborate than female marital status markers. In many cultures, they may not exist.

=== Jewelry ===
In many Western nations, some husbands wear a wedding ring on the third or fourth finger of the left hand. In parts of Europe, especially in German-speaking regions, as well as in Bulgaria, Cyprus, Denmark, Greece, Hungary, Latvia, Lithuania, North Macedonia, Norway, Poland, Russia, Serbia, Spain, Turkey, and Ukraine, the wedding ring is worn on the ring finger of the right hand. In the Netherlands, Catholics wear their wedding rings on the left hand, while most other people wear them on the right. Some spouses choose to wear their wedding ring on the left hand in Turkey.

In China, Western influence has resulted in some husbands donning wedding rings.

In modern times, the material of wedding rings is not strictly prescribed; they may be forged of gold, rose gold, white gold, argentium silver, palladium, platinum, titanium, or tungsten carbide.

Manual laborers sometimes wear rings of inexpensive or more durable materials like tungsten while working or bear an ink tattoo to avoid personal injury or damaging a ring of precious metal. Additionally, the use of silicone wedding bands has become more common among men (and women) while in a gym or other environment with potential hazards (firefighter, etc.); these bands have enough flexibility to snap off if caught and are not typically electrically conductive.

=== Beard ===
Among the Amish, and Hutterite communities of Canada and the United States, only married men are permitted to grow and maintain a beard. Unmarried men were required to shave.

=== Sacred thread ===
In contemporary Hinduism, after the Upanayana ceremony, Brahmin men wear a sacred thread (Yagnopavitam) over their left shoulder and under right arm, one that usually has 3 strands and 1 knot, when they start their traditional education. When men get married, they wear one more sacred thread, 6 strands and 2 knots, the second thread signifies his marriage to his wife. In traditional attire, the sacred thread is usually visible, but in the modern era, it is hidden within the shirt.

== Wife ==
=== Jewelry ===
- Engagement ring: In many Western cultures, a proposal of marriage is traditionally accompanied by the gift of a ring. The man proposes and offers the ring; if the woman accepts this proposal of marriage, she will wear the ring, showing she is no longer available for courtship. In British-American tradition, diamond rings are the most popular type of engagement ring. The engagement ring is usually worn on the left ring finger (sometimes this ring is switched from the right to the left hand as part of the wedding ceremony).
- Wedding ring: Many Western wedding ceremonies include the exchange of a wedding ring or rings. A common custom is for the groom to place a ring on the bride's finger and say, "With this ring I thee wed." Sometimes both bride and groom present each other with rings and repeat either these or similar words. After the ceremony, the rings are worn throughout the marriage. In the event of divorce, the couple usually removes their rings; but some widows continue to wear their wedding ring, sometimes switching it to the right hand, while others do not. In Jewish tradition, the wedding ring must be a plain band, without gemstones. China has acquired the custom of wedding rings as late as the era of post-Cultural Revolution economic reforms, when rings were affordable and Western influence was allowed in. As an adopted habit, there are variations on how rings are used, if at all, and when. Some women wear the wedding ring on the left hand, men on the right (representing yin and yang). Some men wear the ring on the right hand. Many Chinese put the ring away to protect it, except for important holidays, such as anniversaries. In Chinese tradition, higher status for men was signified by having several young female partners or concubines. A ring denies that status. For this reason, many modern Chinese men do not wear a wedding ring. Diamonds and two-partner wedding rings are advertised in modern China. The Japanese, despite American occupation in the 1950s, only acquired a culture for wedding and engagement rings in the 1960s. In 1959, the importing of diamonds was allowed. In 1967 a U.S. advertising agency created a marketing campaign on behalf of the De Beers diamonds. The campaign equated rings with other symbols of Western culture. The campaign resulted in a sharp increase in demand: From 5% in 1967, to 27% in 1972, to 50% in 1978, to 60% in 1980.
- Toe rings: Toe rings in India are usually made of silver and worn in pairs (unlike in Western countries, where they are worn singly or in unmatched pairs) on the second toe of both feet. Traditionally they are quite ornate, though more contemporary designs are now being developed to cater to the modern bride. Toe rings may not be made of gold, as gold holds a 'respected' status and may not be worn below the waist by Hindus.
- Mangalasutra: In Hindu wedding ceremonies, the groom gives the bride a gold pendant or necklace incorporating black beads or black string. This is called a "mangalasutra". It not only proclaims a woman's marriage, but it is believed by many to exercise a protective influence over the husband. This resembles the karwa-chauth celebration, in which a wife fasts and prays for her husband's welfare.
- Bangles: Hindu wives also wear bangles of either white ("sankha") and/or red colour ("pala") on both hands, and do not remove them until they are single. Often made of glass, they are broken when the marriage ends. Bangles made of gold, silver, or other materials are also worn by middle class wives.

=== Headwear ===
In Orthodox Judaism, married women cover their hair at all times outside of their home. The kind of hair covering may be determined by local custom or personal preference. Headscarves, snoods, hats, berets, or – sometimes – wigs are used. Turkmen wives wear a special hat similar to a circlet that is denominated a "Alyndaňy".

=== Hairstyle ===
- Hairstyle indicating marital status
- Zuni hair styles

=== Cosmetics ===
- Sindoor, a red powder (vermilion), is put on Hindu wives' foreheads to indicate their marital status.

=== Clothes ===
- Tibetan wives wear aprons.
- In western and northern Europe, it was previously common for widows to wear black, at least until the first anniversary of the death of their husbands, and some still practice this custom.
