= Marital status =

Indication of a person's relationship with a significant other

Civil status, or marital status, are the distinct options that describe a person's relationship with a significant other. Married, single, divorced, and widowed are examples of civil status.

Civil status and marital status are terms used in forms, vital records, and other documents to ask or indicate whether a person is married or single. In the simplest contexts, no further distinction is made. A status of married means that a person was wed in a manner legally recognized by their jurisdiction. A person's specified civil status might also be married if they are in a civil union or common-law marriage. The civil status of a person who is legally separated is married.

Whether a cohabiting couple (such as in a domestic partnership) have a civil status of "married" depends on the circumstances and the jurisdiction. In addition to those who have never married, single status applies to people whose relationship with a significant other is not legally recognized.

Questions about civil status appear on questionnaires for quantitative research, such as census forms and market research instruments. In a person's medical history, civil status is considered to have both quantitative and qualitative significance. A government records the civil status of its citizens by means of a civil registration system. Historically, inquiries into marital status have appeared on applications for employment, loans, and credit.

Familial status indicates whether a person is the responsible caregiver for a child.

== See also ==
- Visual markers of marital status
- Marriage gap
- Vital record
- Vital statistics (government records)
- Mortgage discrimination
