= Toe ring =

Ring worn on any toe

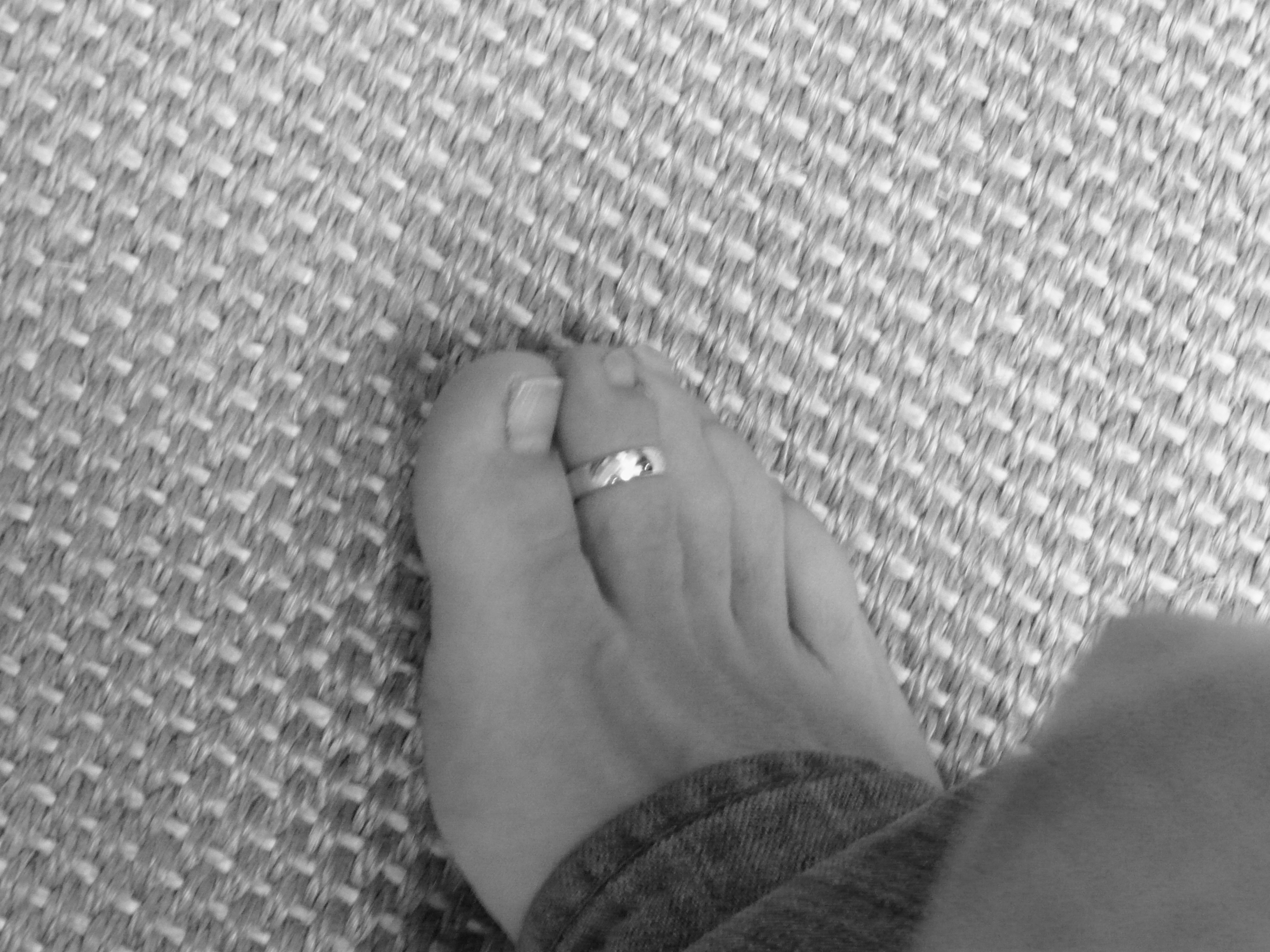
- Location: Toe
- Jewelry: Band construction (how it fits onto the toe); Decorative style (the visual motifs and materials used)

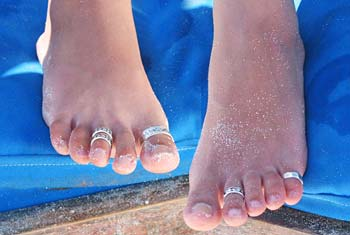
Various toe rings

A toe ring is a ring made out of metals and non-metals worn on any of the toes. The second toe of either foot is where they are worn most commonly. This is because proportionately it is the longest toe and thus the easiest toe to put a ring on and stay without being connected to anything else. In most western countries they are a relatively new fashion accessory, and typically have no symbolic meaning. They are usually worn with barefoot sandals, anklets, bare feet or flip flops.

Like finger rings, toe rings come in many shapes and forms, from intricately designed flowers embedded with jewels to simple bands. Fitted toe rings are rings that are of one size, whereas adjustable toe rings have a gap at the bottom so they can be easily made to fit snugly.

== Toe rings in India ==
The wearing of toe rings has been practised in India since ancient times. In the Ramayana, there is a mention of Sita, on being abducted by Ravana, throwing her toe ring down so that lord Rama could find her. Toe rings worn by a woman signify that she is married. In many different Indian cultures, the husband puts the toe rings on the second toe of both of the wife's feet during the wedding ceremony. It is worn as a symbol of the married state by Hindu women and is called bichiya (pronounced: bee-chee-ya) in Hindi, minji (മിഞ്ചി) or kaalmothiram (കാൽമോതിരം) in Malayalam, Pāda Jhuṇtikā (ପାଦ ଝୁଣ୍ଟିକା) in Odia language, jodavi (जोडवी) in Marathi, Mettelu (మెట్టెలు) in Telugu, Angot (আঙট/আংট্; pronounced: aa-nng-ot) in Bengali, Metti/Kanaiyazhi in Tamil (மெட்டி/கணையாழி), Kaalungura (ಕಾಲುಂಗುರಗಳು) in Kannada.

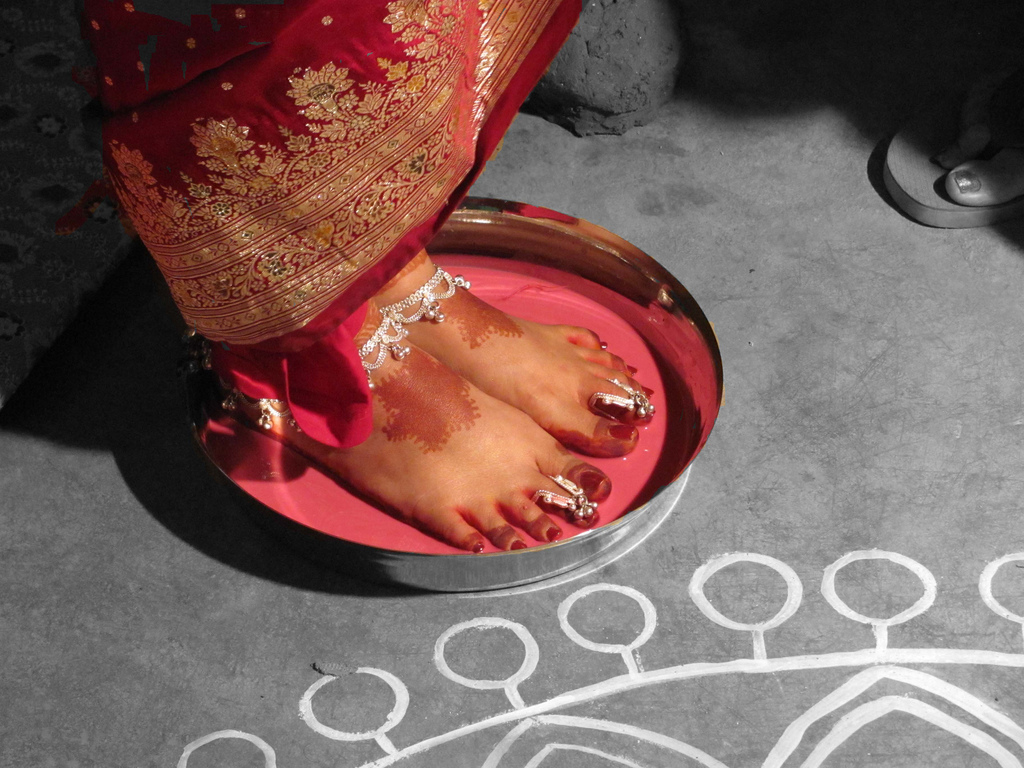
A ceremony welcoming the newly wed bride to her new home. Bride wearing toe-ring (bichiya), worn as symbol of the married state of Hindu women.

Toe rings in India are usually made of silver and worn in pairs (unlike in Western countries, where they are worn singly or in unmatched pairs) on the second toe of both feet. Traditionally, they are quite ornate, though more contemporary designs are now being developed to cater to the modern bride. Some 'bichiya sets' may have pairs for four of the five toes, excluding the little pinky. 'Bichiyas' may not be made of gold, as gold holds a 'respected' status and may not be worn below the waist by Hindus, but this is not followed very strictly and toe rings made of gold and diamonds are commonly seen.

Toe rings are believed to have other associated benefits according to Ayurveda. Toe rings have been believed to be worn to regulate the menstrual cycle, and thus increase the chances of conception, as the slight pressure on the second toe ensures a healthy uterus. Some cultures also say that the pressure felt on the second toe helps to ease pain during intercourse. Unmarried Hindu girls may put toe rings on the third toe to help ease menstrual pain. Although there have been no scientific studies to verify these claims.

Toe rings are also worn by men in Tamil culture, usually in a simpler design for comfort. The practice of Tamil men wearing toe rings/Metti had a use in ancient times when people used to walk around barefoot. The toe ring was a way for women to identify married men as it was the norm for women to look down when walking.

In the 19th century, mirror rings (i.e. rings with a small used mirror placed on them) were sometimes worn on the great toe assumed to be for decorative purposes. Nowadays, toe rings are available in rubber and non-precious metals and are used for decorative purposes. Traditionally, a large ring was worn on the great toe of the left foot to indicate a married status. Some men frequently wore a ring on the big toe for curative purposes or to augment their masculine vigor. These rings were seldom closed circles but open hoops so that they could easily be removed.

== Toe rings outside India ==
In the US, toe rings are worn by men and women alike. There is no particular significance of wearing a toe ring, but more of a fashion jewelry statement.

Toe rings can be found at many state fair booths and beach town shops around the country. Small boutiques in popular tourist locations often offer personal fittings of fitted rings, which can be worn year round. Often, the rings are fitted by spraying Windex on the toe, then sliding them on for a tight fit.

In Africa, toe rings are worn by male and females. It is believed that the tradition arrived to Africa from India.

== Gallery ==
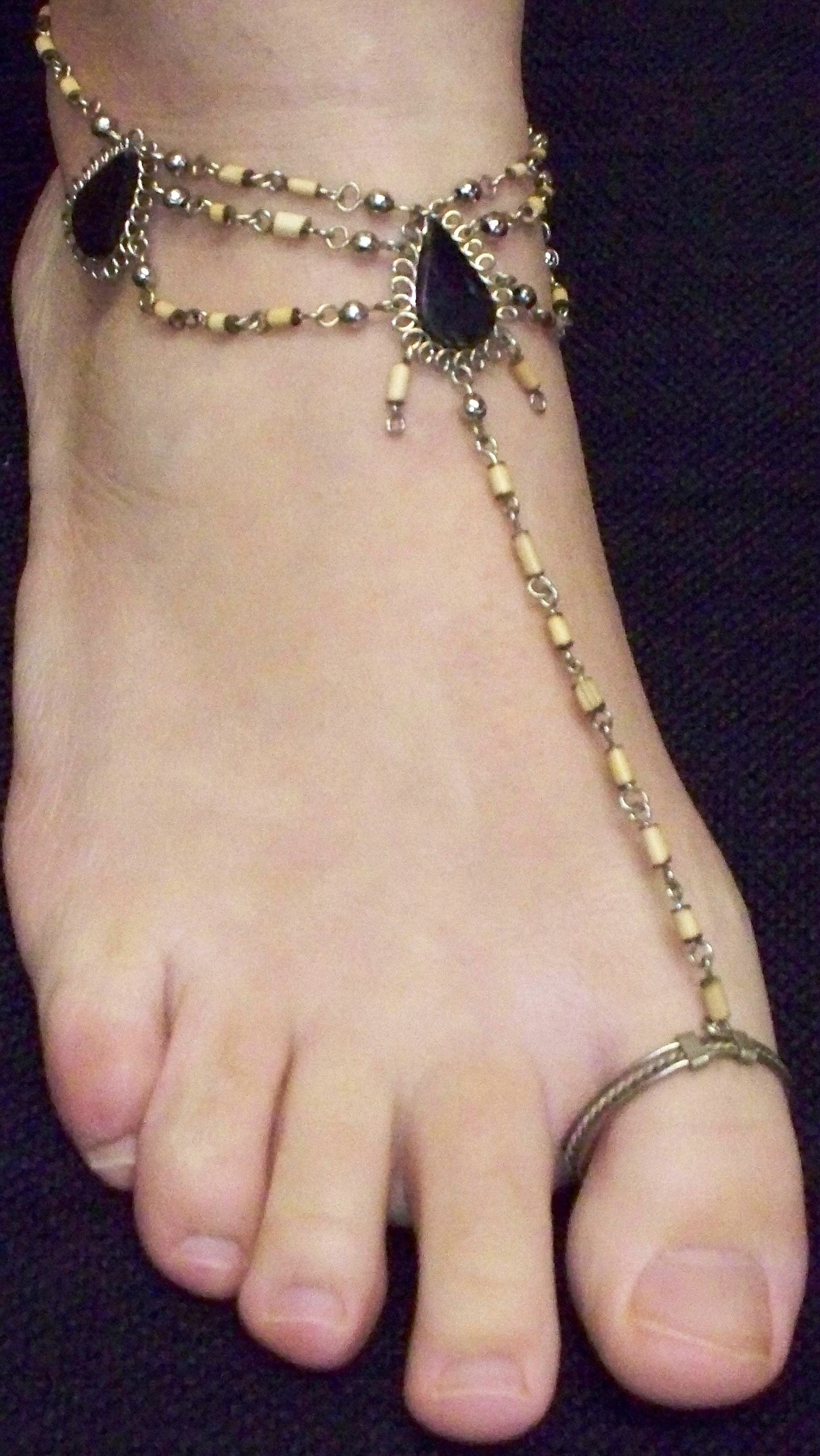
A toe ring with attached anklet

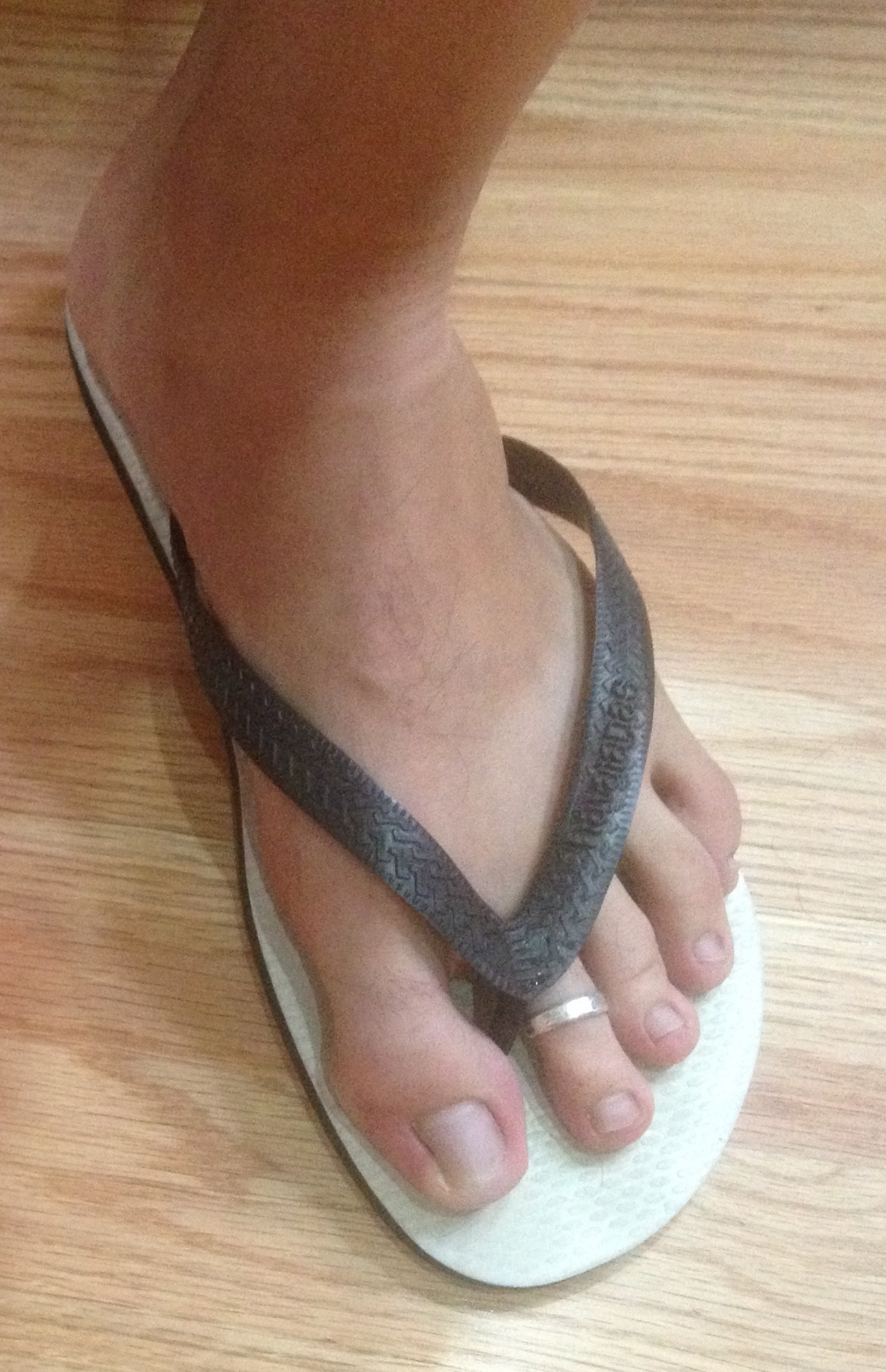
A toe ring being worn by a man
