= Ring (jewellery) =

Round band worn as ornamental jewellery

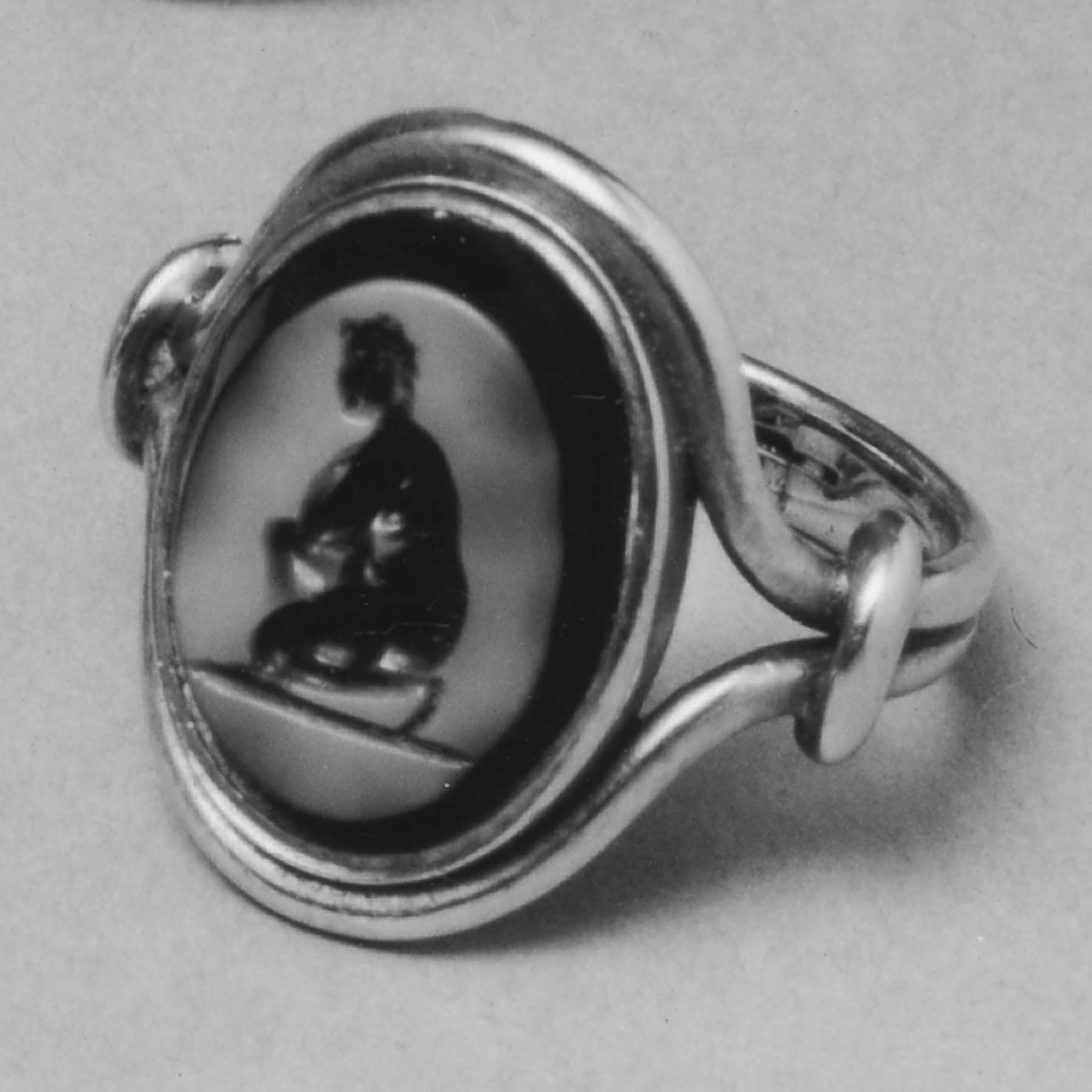
- Location: Finger
- Jewelry: Engagement; Wedding band; Promise; Eternity band; Cocktail; Signet; Right-hand ring; Class ring; Birthstone; Claddagh ring; Mood ring

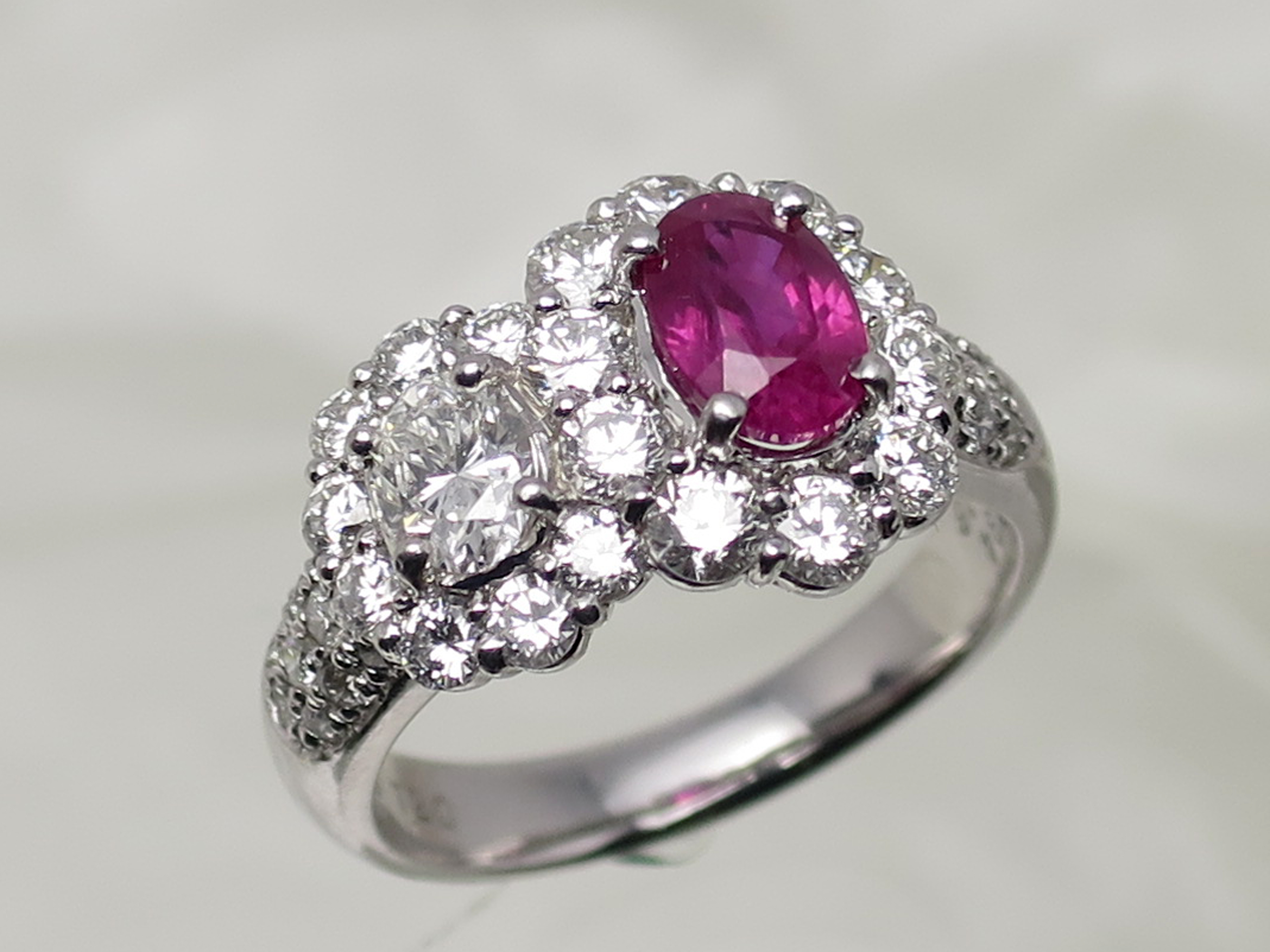
Ruby ring

A ring is a round band, usually made of metal, worn as ornamental jewelry. The term "ring" by itself denotes jewellery worn on the finger; when worn as an ornament elsewhere, the body part is specified within the term, e.g., earrings, neck rings, arm rings, and toe rings. Rings fit snugly around or in the part of the body they ornament, so bands worn loosely, like a bracelet, are not rings. Rings may be made of almost any hard material: wood, bone, stone, metal, glass, jade, gemstone or plastic. They may be set with gemstones (diamond, ruby, sapphire or emerald) or with other types of stone or glass.

Although some people wear rings as mere ornaments or as conspicuous displays of wealth, rings have symbolic functions respecting marriage, exceptional achievement, high status or authority, membership in an organization, and the like. Rings can be made to sport insignia which may be impressed on a wax seal or outfitted with a small compartment in which to conceal things.

== Anatomy ==
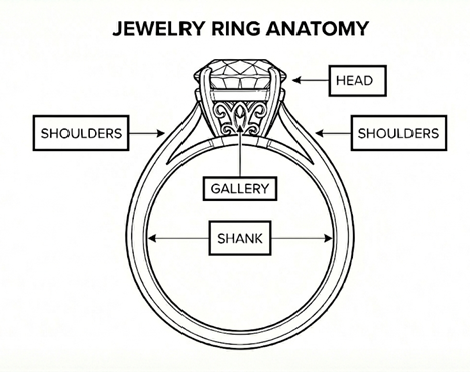
Anatomy of a solitary ring

A typical ring includes the following parts:

- The shank ("hoop") is the band of the ring that encircles the finger. It is the metal part that forms the ring itself, excluding the setting;
- The shoulders are the upper sides of the ring shank that rise to meet the setting (or head). They serve as the transition point between the band and the main gemstone. Shoulders are often thickened, raised, or decorated to provide structural support for the setting and to integrate the head visually with the shank;
- The head (also known as setting) sits atop the shank and physically holds the gemstone. It might includes the prongs (claws), bezel, collet, or gallery wire that secures the stone;
- The gallery is a decorative band usually mass-produced with a row of perforations. In the pre-made form, the boundary of each hole is closed (a closed gallery). Cutting the boundaries of the holes creates a series of U-shapes that can be used as prongs (an open gallery).

== History ==
=== Ancient India ===
Rings and other types of jewelry including necklaces, bracelets, earrings, bangles and pendants have been discovered from the 3rd millennium BCE Indus Valley civilization. Factories of small beads have been discovered in Lothal, India.

=== Ancient Near East ===
Rings have been found in tombs in Ur dating back to circa 2500 BC. The Hittite civilization produced rings, including signet rings, only a few of which have been discovered. People in Old Kingdom Egypt wore a variety of rings, of which a few examples have been found, including the famous scarab design. Rings became more common during the Egyptian Middle Kingdom, containing increasingly complex designs. Egyptians made not only metal rings but rings from faience, some of which were used as new year gifts. Native styles were superseded by Greek and Roman fashions during the Ptolemaic dynasty.

=== Archaic and classical Greek ===
Archaic Greek rings were to some extent influenced by Egyptian rings, although they tended to be less substantial and were not generally used as working signet rings. As gold was not locally available, rings made in the eastern colonies tended to be made from silver and bronze, while Etruscans used gold.

The classical period showed a shift away from bronze to a wider adoption of silver and gold. The most typical design of the period involved a lozenge bezel mounting an intaglio device. Over time, the bezel moved towards a more circular form.

=== Roman ===
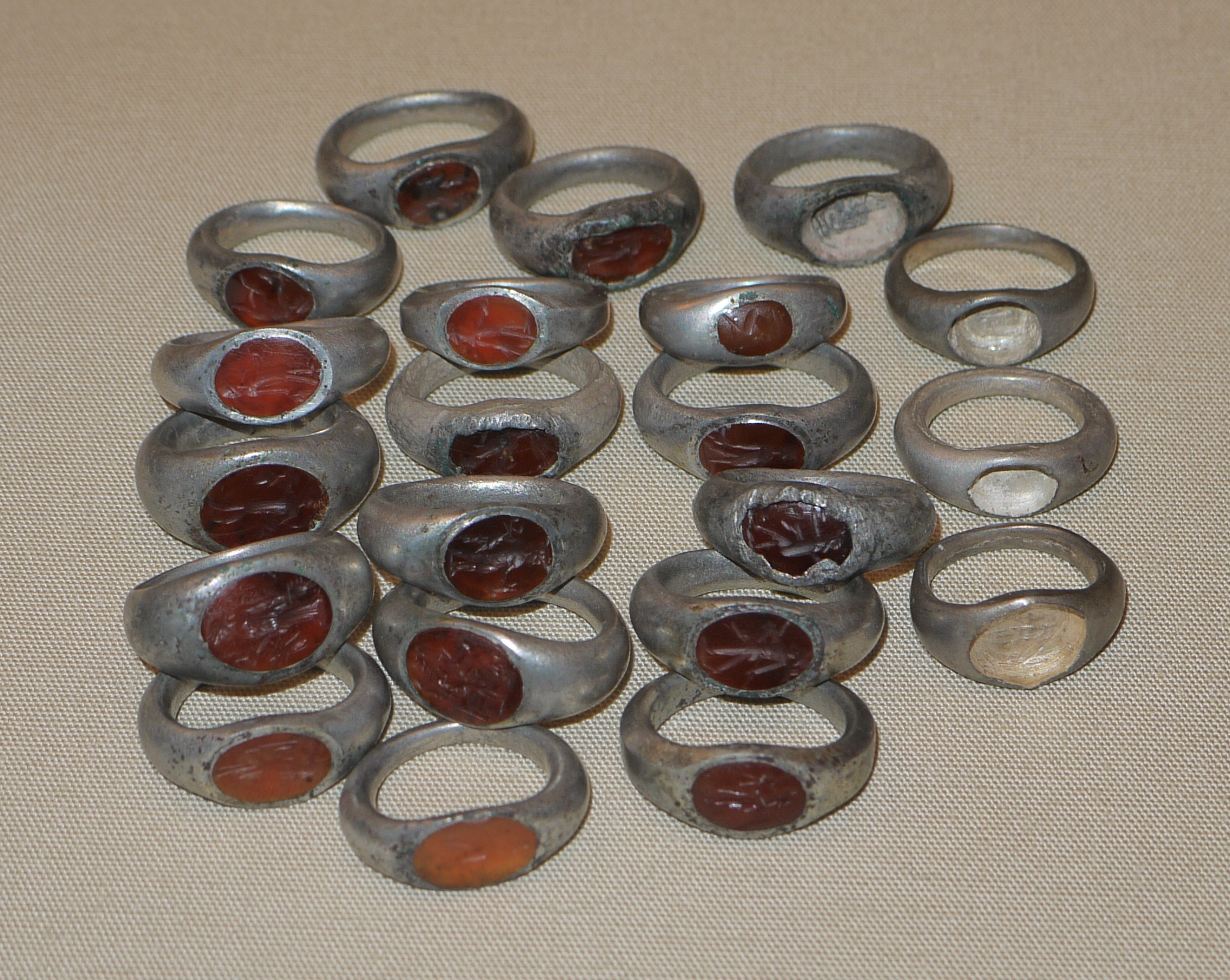
Henig II rings from the Snettisham Jeweller's Hoard

During the early and middle imperial era (first two centuries AD), a typical Roman ring consisted of a thick hoop that tapered directly into a slightly wider bezel. An engraved oval gem would be embedded within the bezel with the top of the gem only rising slightly above the surrounding ring material. Such rings are known as Henig II and III / Guiraud 2 in technical parlance or simply as Roman rings to modern jewellers. In general, Roman rings became more elaborate in the third and fourth centuries AD.

=== Germanic ===
Rings were highly important in early Germanic cultures, being worn variously on arms, fingers and necks. They had a central role in the interconnected roles of swearing oaths, affirming loyalty through gifting, and in financial transactions. They further feature prominently in Germanic mythology and legend and are widely distributed in the archaeological record, being frequently found across the Germanic-speaking world between the Migration Period and into the Viking Age.

=== High and Late Middle Ages in Europe ===
During this period, it was fashionable for several rings to be worn on each hand and each finger. Rings during this period were mostly made from copper-based alloys, silver or gold. Gems became common after 1150, along with the belief that certain gems had the power to help or protect the wearer in various ways. Engraved rings were produced using Lombardic script until around 1350, when it was replaced by Gothic script. Some of the inscriptions were devotional, others romantic in nature. For romantic inscriptions, French was the language of choice. An increasing use of contracts and other documents requiring formal seals meant that signet rings became more important from the 13th century onwards.

== Ring location ==
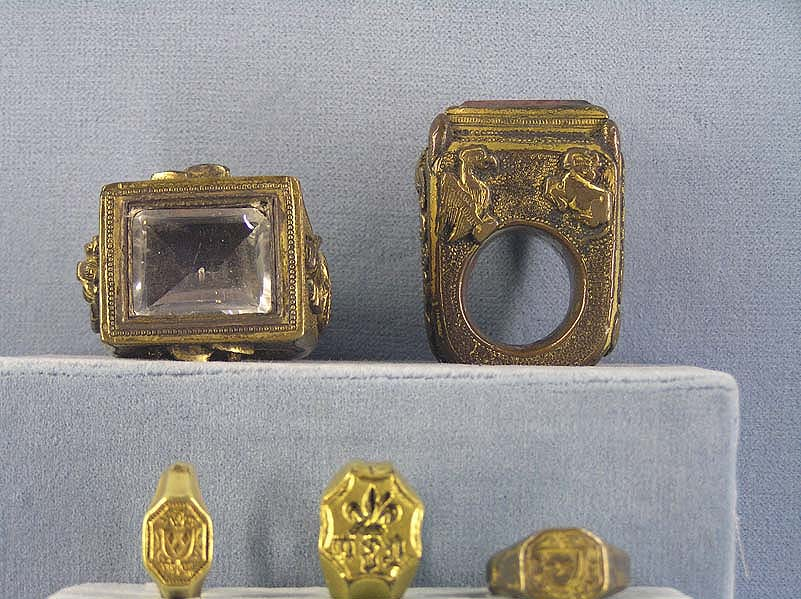
Episcopal rings for bishops and archbishops. (Musée national du Moyen Âge, hôtel de Cluny, Paris)

Each finger had a symbolic association or meaning (most of which were lost in antiquity and varied with culture) for the placement of a ring, significant to observers.

The fourth digit or ring finger of the left hand has become the customary place to wear betrothal, engagement and wedding rings in much of the world, though in certain countries the right hand finger is used. This custom was practically established as norm during World War II.

The use of the fourth finger of the left hand (the 'ring finger') is associated with an old belief that the left hand's ring finger is connected by a vein directly to the heart: the vena amoris, or vein of love. This idea was in vogue in the 16th and 17th century England, when Henry Swinburne referred to it in his book about marriage. It can be traced to ancient Rome, when Aulus Gellius cited Appianus as saying that the ancient Egyptians had found a fine nerve linking the fourth finger to the heart.

Occasionally rings have been re-purposed to hang from bracelets or necklaces.

The signet ring is traditionally worn on the left pinky or little finger.

A birthstone ring and/or "birthday" stone ring is customarily worn on the first finger of the right hand and indicates respectively the month and day of the week in and on which the bearer was born.

Amulet rings, meaningful for various purposes from protection (pentacle rings) to augmenting personal attributes (wisdom, confidence, social status etc.), are worn on various fingers, often depending on the intent of the ring's design or attributes of the stone inset. Although it has been thought that amulet rings worn on specific fingers for specific purposes enhanced their powers, most people simply wear them on any finger on which they fit.

Thumb rings were originally worn to protect the thumb from injuries caused by the launching of arrows and are a sign of an archer.

== Size ==
While the ISO standard defines ring size in terms of the inner circumference (measured in millimeters), various countries still use traditional sizing systems. Sizing beads, which functionally reduce the ring size, are small metal beads added to the inner surface of a ring to hold it in place against the finger; they have the advantage of being easily added or removed.

== Styles ==
After several thousand years of ring manufacture, the total number of styles produced is vast. Even cataloging the rings of a single civilization, such as the Romans, presents a major challenge. As a result, the following list should be considered to be very limited.

Ring	Image	Usage
Acrostic ring		A ring on which gemstones are arranged to spell a word or name with the gemstones' initials in an acrostic style. Often, sentimental words such as 'dearest' and 'regards' or 'regard' are used.
Aqiq ring		A carnelian or agate ring worn by some Muslims in imitation of Muhammad.
Birthstone ring		Usually a slender, simple ring (sometimes consisting of a band), set with the wearer's birthstone or the birthstone of the wearer's spouse. Such birthstone rings as the Mother's ring can be worn set with various birthstones. Some couples wear birthstones set with a wedding anniversary month birthstone as well as other commemorative stones.
Cameo (carving) ring		A plain hoop mounted by a table setting, into which is affixed a carved cameo. This ring style is exceedingly ancient and was more commonly worn by men than women. Ancient cameos depicted pagan gods, Christian saints and even self-portraits. Multi-coloured stone and often marble or porphyry was most desirable, as it produced a striped, layered or three-dimensional effect. The modern cameo ring usually shows the profile of a goddess or a Roman soldier.
Championship ring a.k.a. sports ring		A ring presented to members of winning teams in professional sports leagues as well as college tournaments in the Americas. The best known of these are the Super Bowl ring and World Series ring. Also, in professional American sports leagues—such as the National Football League (NFL) and Major League Baseball (MLB)—the runners-up of the league championship game/series are awarded a ring, being the champion of their conference (sub-league).
Claddagh ring		An Irish friendship, courtship or engagement ring. It is traditionally used to indicate the state of romantic availability. In recent times it is commonly worn as a wedding ring. In centuries past, this ring was bequeathed from a mother to daughter, though men also wore it.
Class ring		Worn by students and alumni in commemoration of their graduation.
Cocktail ring		An oversized ladies' ring with a large center stone often surrounded by tiny stones. Nearly any oversized ladies' ring may be termed "cocktail". This is the most common type of costume jewellery ring and is also known as a cluster ring, statement ring and/or dinner ring.
Doctoral ring		A gold ring worn by a scholar who earns a doctoral degree at a Danish or Swedish university. In America it is common for priests who have earned their doctorate in theology to wear such a ring on the ring finger of their right hand.
Ecclesiastical ring		A religious ring, either of authority for clerics or as some other special religious symbol. When worn by bishops or higher-ranking priests, it is called "Episcopal ring".
Elephant hair ring		A ring made from fallen elephant tail hair worn in the belief that it will provide the wearer with protection.
Engagement ring		A ring was given to and worn by a woman signifying her engagement to be married.
Eternity ring		A ring symbolizing eternity with a partner. These are often given in lieu of engagement rings, as when former UK Prime Minister Gordon Brown purchased one for his wife (as a recompense for not having originally proposed to her with an engagement ring).
Eye ring		Also called a "Lover's eye ring". Popularised in 1784, when the Prince Regent (later George IV) fell for Maria Fitzherbert
Fede ring		A ring style featuring two clasped hands.
Finger armor ring		A ring style which spans from the base of the finger to just below the fingernail or middle of the second joint. This type of ring includes a bending joint.
Gay Pride ring (a.k.a. "Rainbow ring")		Representing gay pride, a ring which is usually a band, either set with seven stones or inlaid with seven enamelled lines, in the seven colours representing the Rainbow flag (LGBT movement). In decades past, a stone-set ring worn on the right hand ring finger or the pinky of either hand represented a call for gay equality.
Giardinetti ring		Italian for 'little garden' a design which features an openwork bezel containing multiple small stones. It was most prominent in the second half of the 18th century.
Gimmal ring		Ring made of 2 or 3 hoops that are hinged at the back and meant to interlock and open; popular for betrothals in 16th- and 17th-century Europe
Guard ring (a.k.a. ring-guard)		A slender, slightly tighter-fitting ring designed to be placed on the finger after a large/loose ring, to prevent slippage and ring loss.
Iron Ring, and Engineer's Ring		Ring worn by American and Canadian engineers, after swearing the Engineer's Oath. This is often in the form of a crudely worked piece of iron; modern rings tend to be sleek steel, some with etched geometric designs. The ring is meant to be worn on the pinky (little) finger of the dominant hand at all times. This ring has been loosely associated with Rudyard Kipling.
Key ring		A ring with a key mounted on the bezel. Used by the Romans as both a means of carrying a key to their family valuables chest and to demonstrate their status within the family.
Memento mori ring		Largely dating from the 16th to the 17th centuries, memento rings featured a skull and the inscription Memento Mori ("Remember Death") sometimes combined with other features.
Midi ring		A ring worn above the knuckle.
Mood ring		A novelty ring which changes colour in response to body temperature, using a thermochromic liquid crystal.
Mother's ring		A ring worn by a mother displaying the birthstone of each of her children, and sometimes including those of the mother and father.
Mourning ring		A ring worn in memory of someone who has died. Also commonly called a "memorial ring". Use attested from at least the 14th century AD to the late 19th century.
Multi-finger ring		Two or more laterally conjoined rings, designed to be worn on two, three, or four fingers; popularized by hip-hop culture.
Penannular ring		Found in gold or gilded metal from Bronze Age Britain, these small thick incomplete circles are the wrong size and shape to be finger-rings and were probably worn as nose or ear-rings or attached to the hair or clothing.
Poison ring		A ring consisting of a bezel with a compartment. Despite the name they were probably more commonly used to hold things like perfume or romantic keepsakes.
Posie ring		A ring with a lengthy inscription on its outer surface. These were commonly used as engagement and wedding rings. Also referred to as "posy" or "poesy" rings in reference to the line of poetry most commonly used in the inscription.
Portrait ring		Ring with a small portrait, most common during the 17th century
Pre-engagement ring		A small, inexpensive ring given to a partner, signifying the promise not to court anyone else.
Prison ring		A typically plastic ring fashioned by hand in prisons.
Promise ring		A ring worn to remind a person of a promise. These evolved in conjunction with wedding and religious vow rings in the sense that the ring represented the vow/promise.
Purity ring		A symbol of virginity and a vow to keep virginity in some religious cultures.
Puzzle ring		Interlocking rings forming a single band. A famous example is the classic Cartier "Trinity" wedding ring.
Rosary ring		Also known as a Decade ring. Ring worn around the finger with 10 indentations (or protrusions) and a cross as a bezel, representing one decade of a rosary. The rings are used to keep track of place in the prayer by rotating the ring on a finger and feeling the marks.
Sewing ring		An early form of thimble
Signet ring		An emblematic ring, often bearing a family coat of arms, some of which are fit for use to imprint a wax seal. In the event a seal or at least a representation of a seal is on the ring, it is called a "seal ring". The signet may bear anything from a custom-designed escutcheon to simple initials, in which case it is known as an initial ring.
Sovereign ring		A large solid gold ring set with a gold sovereign.
SS-Ehrenring		Nazi "honor ring" or "ring of honor". A plain silver band decorated with a death's head. Awarded to members of the Nazi SS (Schutzstaffel). A similar ring (in the form of a death's head) was also favored by the SS-SD (Schutzstaffel-Sicherheitsdienst) and was very secretive in design. There were in fact several different award rings during the Third Reich.
Technology ring		The Technology ring is worn in Canada by certified engineering and applied science technologists and technicians. Like an Iron Ring, it is worn on the little finger of the working (dominant) hand.
Thumb ring		Originally thumb rings were used as an archery implement, mainly in eastern styles of archery. Thumb rings are an ancient custom.
Watch ring		A small watch fashioned to be worn as a ring.
Wedding ring		A ring presented at the time of marriage to signify espousal and marital commitment. Originally worn only by women, it is now common for both spouses to wear such a ring.

== Notable rings ==
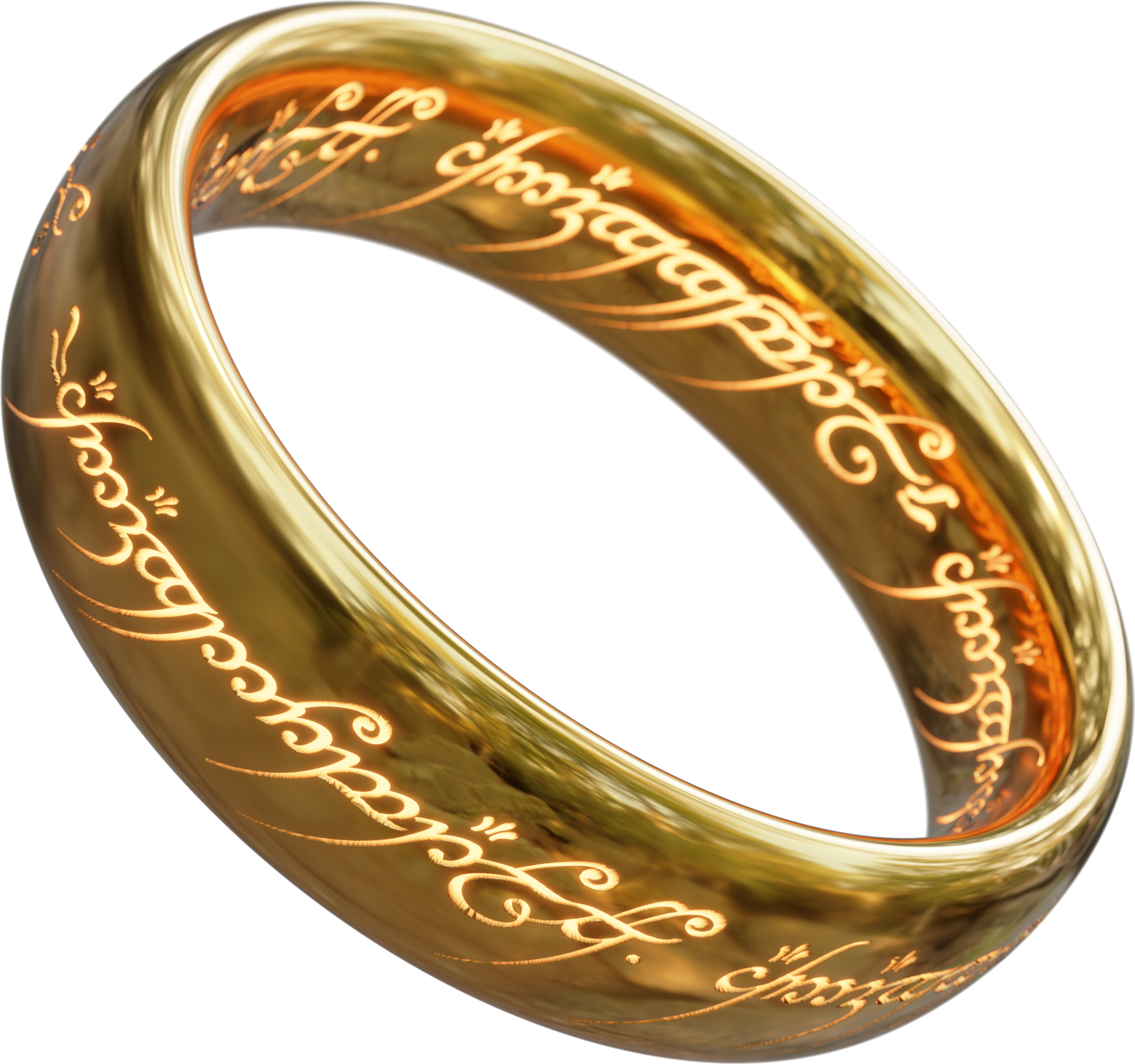
The fictional One Ring

=== Historical and current ===
- Iffland-Ring, held by a series of German-language actors since the 18th century, presently held by German actor Jens Harzer
- Hans-Reinhart-Ring, a Swiss theatre award
- Ring of the Fisherman, the signet ring of the Pope
- Chequers Ring, a ring that belonged to Elizabeth I of England

=== Mythology and folklore ===
- Ring of Gyges, a legendary ring of invisibility, mentioned by Plato
- Andvaranaut, a cursed ring that can find gold in Norse mythology
- Magic ring, a ring that has magical properties
- Draupnir, a self-multiplying gold ring in Norse mythology

=== Fiction ===
- The One Ring, from J. R. R. Tolkien's works such as The Hobbit and The Lord of the Rings

== Safety ==
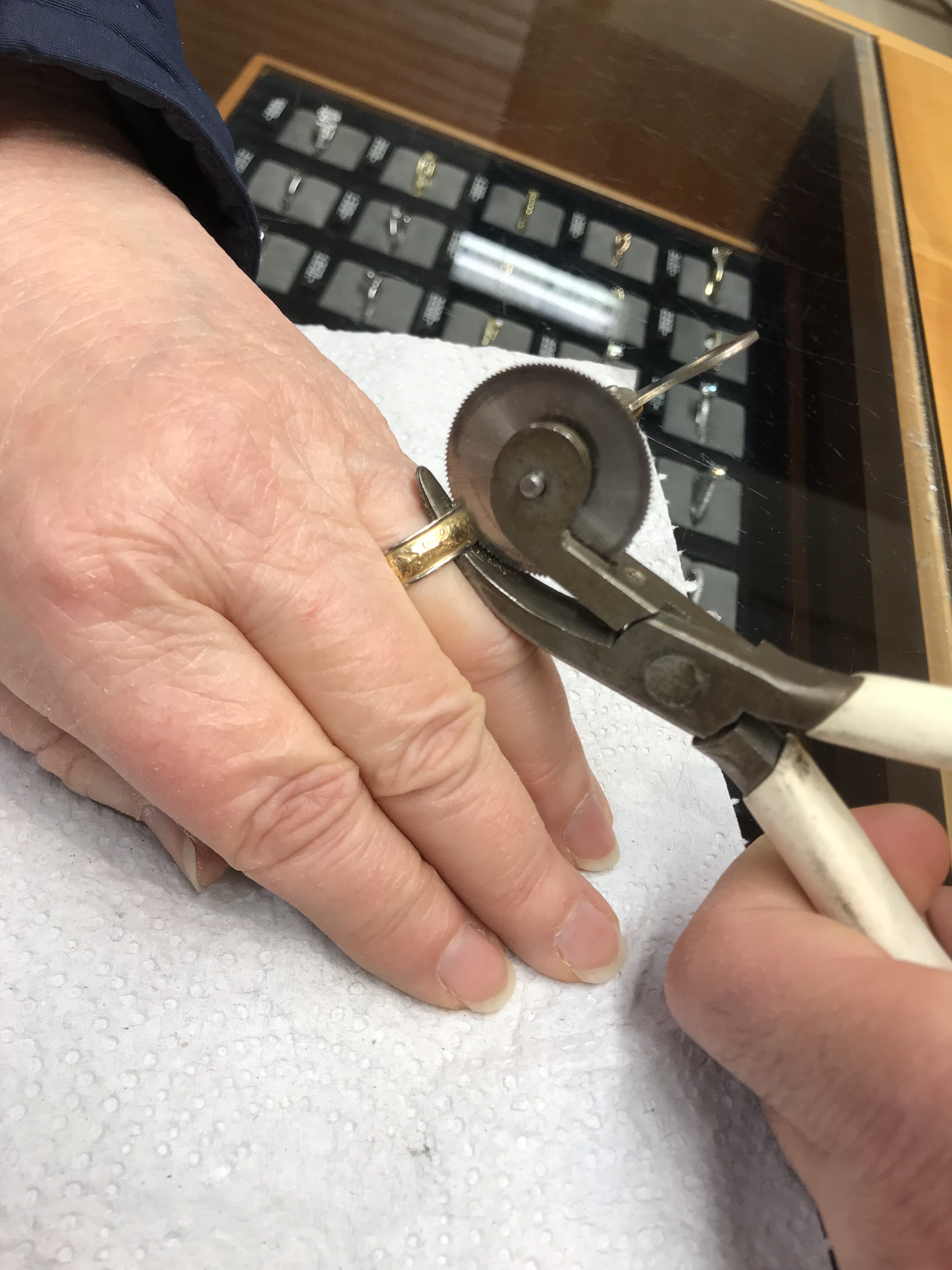
A jeweler using a ring cutter to remove a stuck ring. The cutter has a guard placed under the ring, and a circular saw blade is turned by hand to cut the ring.

Wearing a ring can in some cases be a safety concern, when the ring is made of a material stronger than the hand, fully encircles the digit, and catches onto an immovable object. This can result in serious injury (degloving), amputation, or ring avulsion. Some recommend specifically not to use a ring while operating machinery or playing sports.

If a ring catches on rotating machinery, or the ring of a falling person catches on a stationary object, the wearer may suffer injury. For these reasons, some workplaces require employees to remove their rings temporarily while performing certain tasks or when in certain areas of a workplace. Despite the ring's symbolic appeal as a solid band around the finger, modern jewelers are sometimes known to modify rings such that, at worst, they only tear the flesh of the wearer's finger in cases like those above-mentioned. Such "breakaway" modifications have not yet achieved popularity as standard designs.

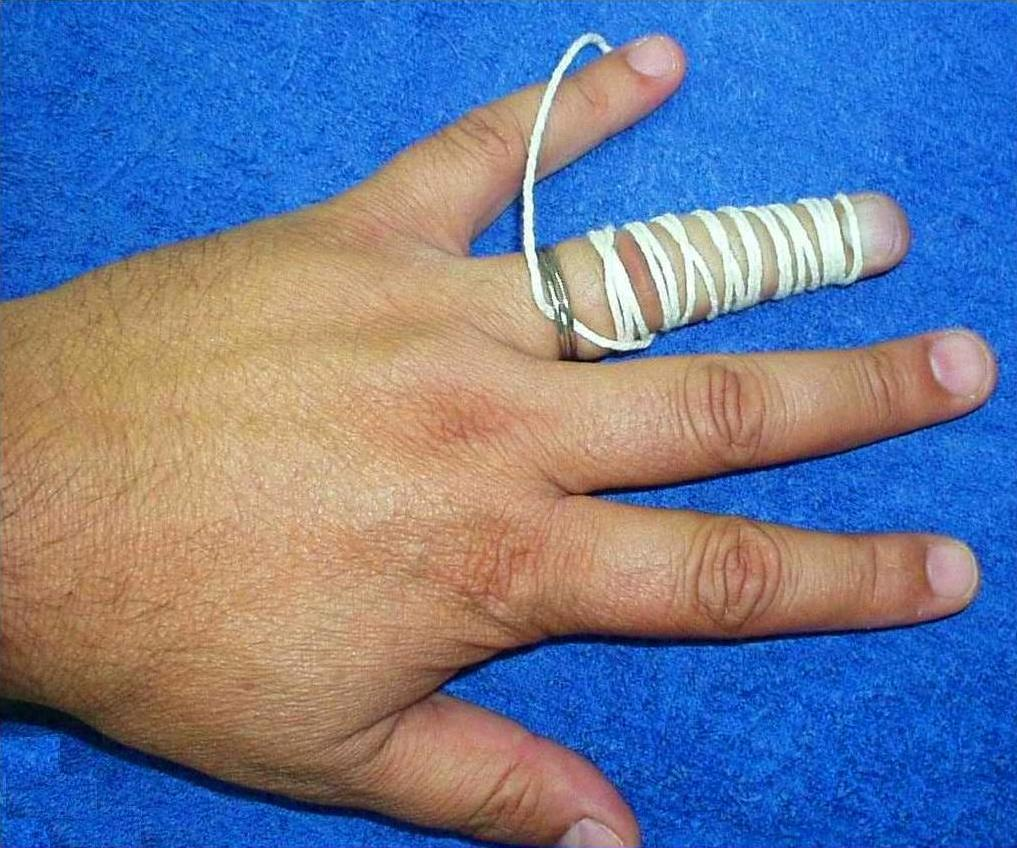
A method of removing a ring

If the area near a ring is injured, the ring is removed immediately, before the injury starts to swell. Pulling rings off forcefully may worsen the swelling. Relaxation, elevation, icing, lubrication, and rotating the ring as if unscrewing it may help. If these methods do not work, it may be possible to remove the ring by temporarily wrapping the finger with a slick string (such as dental floss), passing the inner end of the thread under the ring, and then unwrapping it, pushing the ring ahead of the unwrapping string. Failing that, a doctor may remove it by other methods.

== Other types ==
- Arm rings
- Earring
- Kakute
- Neck rings
- Pinky ring

== See also ==
- Jewellery cleaning
- Metal casting
- Ring of O
- Ring of Solomon
- Smart ring
- Titanium ring

== Sources ==
- Young, Anastasia (2012). Gemstone Settings: The Jewelry Maker's Guide to Styles & Techniques. Loveland, CO: Interweave. ISBN 978-1-59668-636-6.
