= Mardani khel =

Martial Art from Maharashtra, India

Bothati
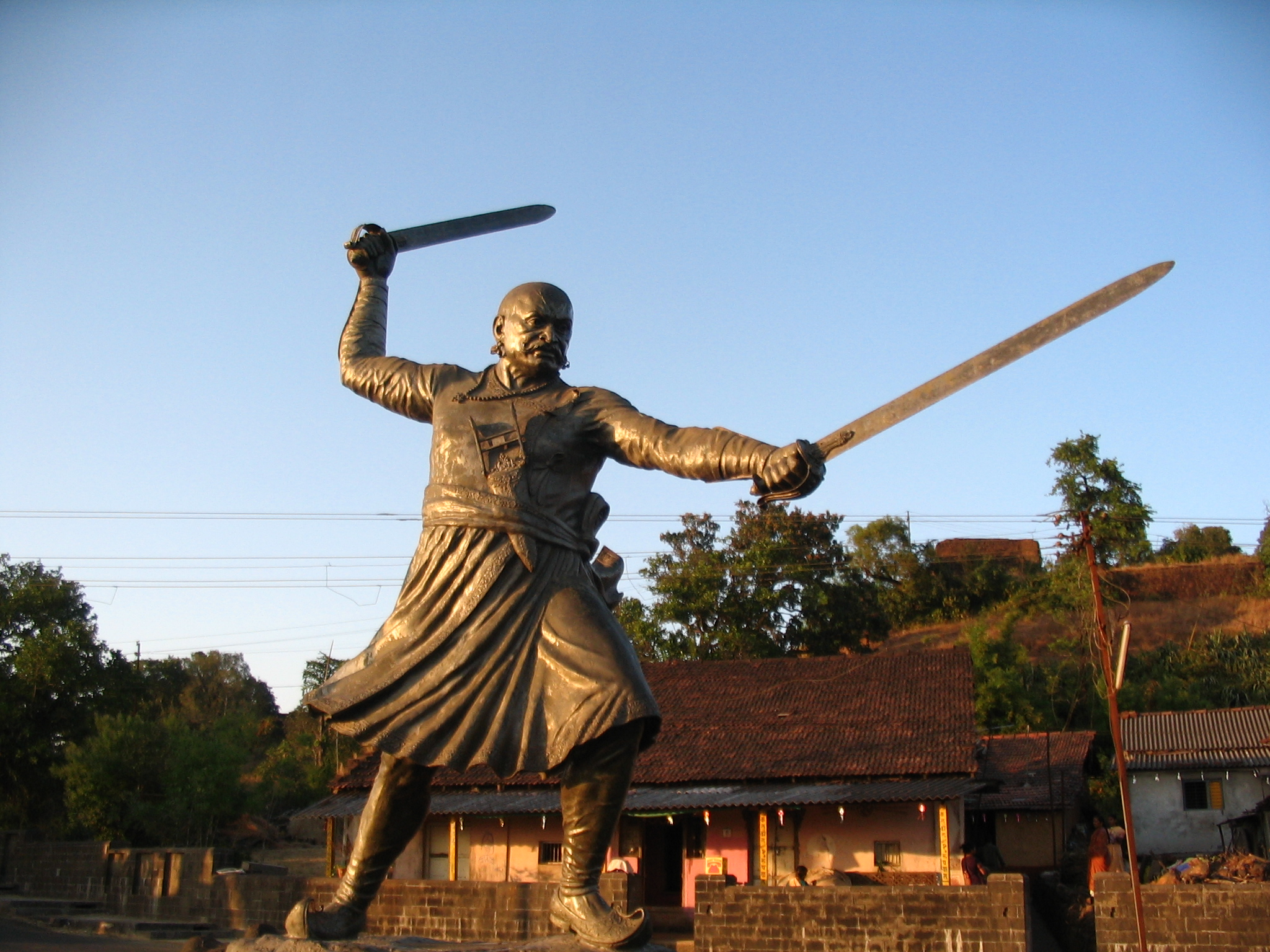
- Statue of Baji Prabhu in a mardani khel dual-sword stance
- Also known as: Mardani khela
- Focus: Armed
- Country of origin: India
- Famous practitioners: Shivaji Raje Bhosale; Tanaji Malusare; Murar Baji; Baji Prabhu
- Olympic sport: No

Mardani Khel and Bothati are armed Indian martial arts from Maharashtra. They are particularly known for their use of the uniquely Indian patta (sword) and vita (corded lance). The early history of Bothati as a distinct system is difficult to trace prior to the 17th century, but it is said to owe its development to the particular geographic conditions of Maharashtra. A hilly region characterized by valleys and caves, the inhabitants became expert horsemen who favoured light armour and highly mobile cavalry units during war.

== History ==
=== Maratha empire ===
Mardani khel began its rise to prominence during the early 1600s when the Deccan sultanates relied on the guerilla tactics of Maratha units led by Shahaji. His son Shivaji Raje Bhosale learned the art of fighting from a young age and by his adolescence was already proficient in the use of various arms. His weapon of choice was a 4-foot sword named Bhawani. At the age of 17, Shivaji took advantage of the chaotic affairs of the Deccan and subverted Bijapuri authority to strike it out on his own. The Maratha community, once scattered across the Deccan, united under Shivaji to create an independent kingdom in the Western Ghats. A Hindu confederacy during a time of intolerant Muslim rule meant that the Marathas were constantly under threat from the Mughals. With limited access to Mughal firearms, they instead capitalized on the local terrain which was unsuitable for the heavy artillery of the invaders. As a result, the Mughals were often forced into hand-to-hand combat, giving the Marathas an advantage despite their comparatively light armour.

=== Chalukya period ===
The heavily martial culture and propensity for the spear of the Marathi people is mentioned as early as the 7th century by the Chinese monk Xuanzang.

"The climate is hot, the disposition of the people is honest and simple, they are of medium build, and of a stern, vindictive character. To their benefactor they are grateful, to their enemies relentless. If they are insulted, they will risk their life to salvage themselves. If they are asked to help one in distress, they willingly agree to. If they are going to seek revenge, they first give their enemy warning, then each being armed they attack each other with lances. When one turns to flee, the other pursues him, but they do not kill a man down (a person who submits). The country provides for a band of champions to the number of several hundred. Each time they are about to engage in conflict, they intoxicate themselves with wine, and then one man with lance in hand will meet ten thousand and challenges them in fight."

According to Xuanzang, this band of champions was seemingly undefeatable in battle. "No enemy can stand before them", and this allowed their king Pulakeshin II to "treat his neighbours with contempt". Denied his rightful place on the throne by his uncle Mangalesha, Pulakeshin organised an army of warriors and led them against his relative. Feudatories challenged Pulakeshin after his coronation, but his army was able to put down all rivals. After further enlarging his fighting force, Pulakeshin embarked on a series of conquests, extending Chalukya reign across most of the Dakhin plateau. In 630 AD he confidently defied the emperor Harsha Vardhana who sent all his troops and the ablest commanders but failed to impress Pulakeshin's gladiators.

Statue of Murar Baji wielding a pair of talwar

== Weapons ==
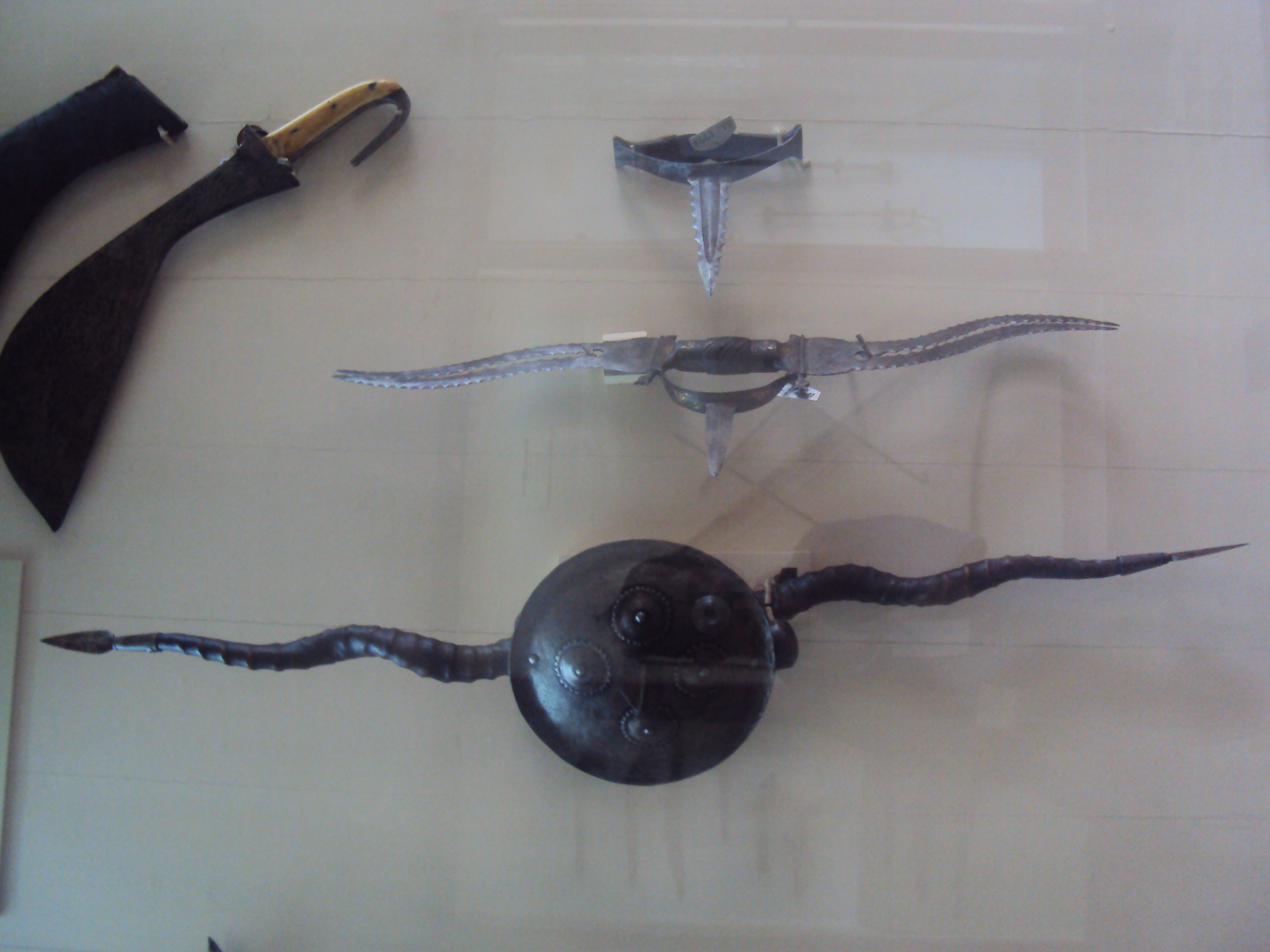
Marathi weapons

- Pata: sword with a hollow handle acting as a handguard
- Talwar: curved single-edge sword
- Bhala: short spear with a broad head, used by infantry
- Barcha: heavy spear made entirely of iron and wielded by infantry
- Vita: lance with a length of cord tying the weapon to the wielder’s hand
- Bothati: lance used from horseback
- Lathi: stick or staff
- Dhala: circular shield
- Madhu: a thrusting weapon inspired by deer horns
- Kurhad: axe
- Danda: Battle-axe
- Khukuri: inward-curving knife
- Danushya: bow and arrow
- Katyara: push-dagger with a H-shaped handle
- Bagh naka: iron claw
- Bichuwa / Bichawa: scorpion knife

== See also ==
- Indian martial arts
- Gatka
- Silambam
- Kalaripayattu
