= Bartholomew Fallon =

17th-century Irish goldsmith

Bartholomew Fallon, (fl. 1676 – c. 1700) was a 17th-century Irish goldsmith, based in Galway. He is first mentioned in the will of Dominick Martin (to whom he was probably apprenticed) dated 26 January 1676, in which Martin willed him some of his tools. Fallon continued working as a goldsmith till as late as 1700. His are among the oldest surviving examples of the Claddagh ring, in many cases bearing his signature.

== See also ==
- Richard Joyce, goldsmith
