= Malli Amman Durgham =

Village in India

Coordinates: 11.58397°N 77.339944°E

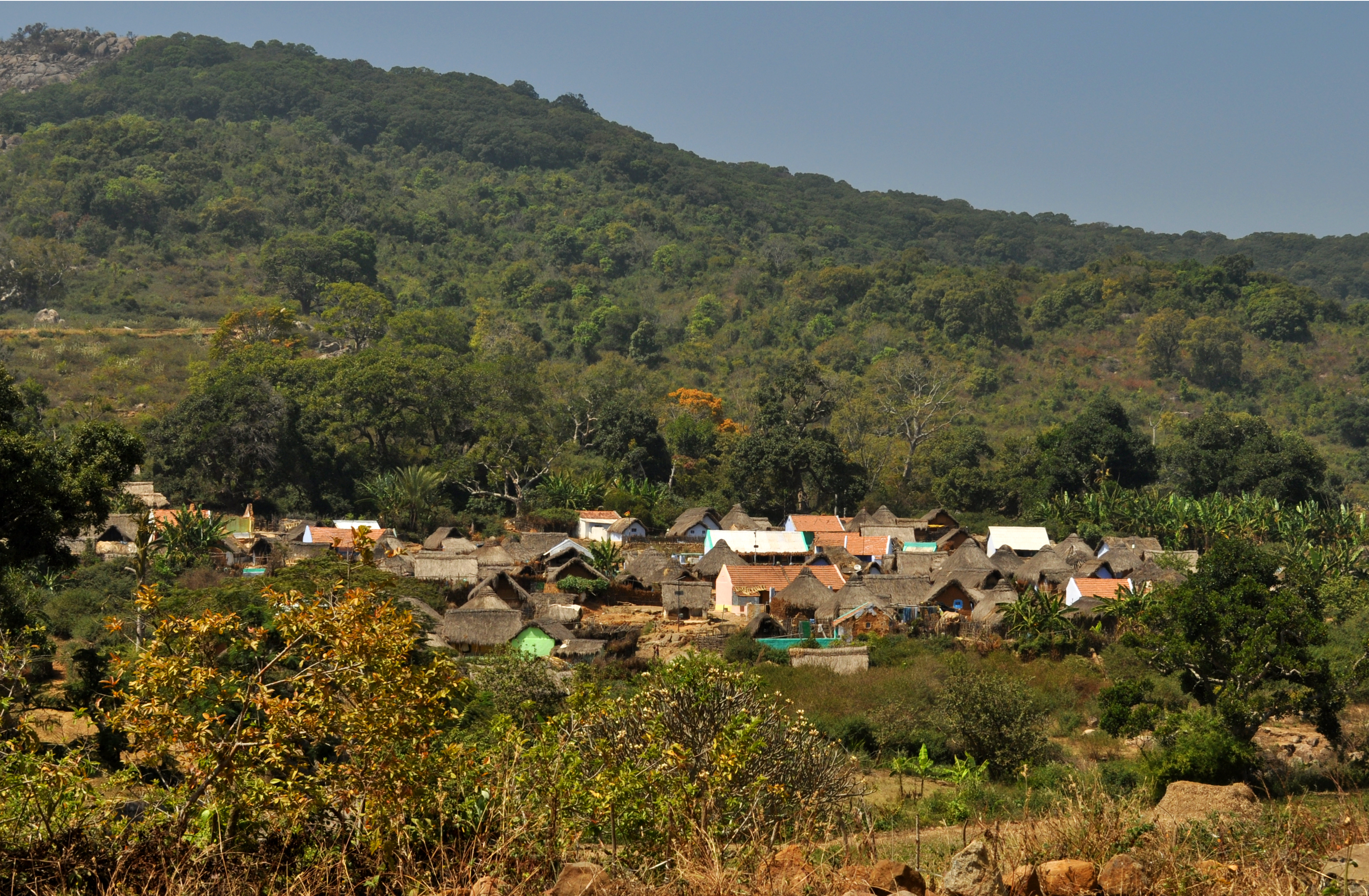
Malli Amman Durgham Village

Malli Amman Durgham - A quiet settlement in Eastern Ghats, amidst dense forests at the top of a mountain at Kadambur Forest Division, Sathyamangalam, Erode District, Tamil Nadu, India.

== History ==
Named after Malli Amman a powerful deity, this village has over 110 houses and 75 families. There is evidence that the village has existed for at least two centuries. The evidence includes gun licenses issued by the British Raj and evidence that patas were supplied to the people of Malli Amman Durgham.

A popular folktale in the area recalls how a stingy Naicker (caste) covered the crops with caps to deprive birds of their food and hence were cursed by the god Malli Amman. The curse brought great difficulties to the Naicker who ultimately went, with other members of his family, into a deep forest and never returned (probably a way of committing suicide by feeding themselves to wild animals). Therefore the people now do nothing to prevent birds and animals from consuming their produce. In fact, 70 percent of their crops are damaged by elephants and wild boars.

== Geography ==
Altitude : 1264 metres above sea level. Northing Line (latitudinal distance) : 11º35’ 02.3" Easting Line (longitudinal distance) : 77º20’ 23.8"

The village is mostly secluded as one needs to trek at least 9 km on foot over steep mountainous terrains where wildlife is abundant. The villagers need to trek to Kadambur, another village, or to Kemma Naicken Palayam (KN Palayam), both equidistant, to buy even basic things like matchboxes and provisions.

There is a sharp division in the composition of forests on either sides of the mountains on which the village is situated. The southern side (towards KN Palayam), which is a rain shadow area, consists mostly of dry deciduous forests whereas the northern side (towards Kalkadambur), which receives most of the rainfall, consists of thick rainforests and provide a canopy. The short stretch of ‘shola forest’ (virgin forests, unaltered by human beings) is also found just above the village.

Currently, a jeep and a pickup truck regularly travel along this road to facilitate transportation to and from Kadambur, as well as the movement of goods.

== Social composition ==
All people of the village belong to the same caste – Malai Vellala Gounders. This caste is considered as a Backward Class by the Government of Tamil Nadu and is not provided Scheduled Tribe Status. Hence multiple government schemes sanctioned for the welfare of the people in tribal settlements do not benefit these people. Some have moved out of the village in search of better amenities and opportunities. Over 250 families lived there a decade ago, of which only 65 are left.

== Occupation ==
The community here is agro based and depend mostly on locally cultivated ragi and broad beans. These produce are not sold and kept for own consumption.

Village also has abundant Guava and Jack Fruit trees. Villagers carry these on heads to Kadambur and KN Palayam for selling.

Many families move out during the seasons of cultivation to work as labourers in fields, and return when agricultural works are thin.

Recently the government has provided them permission to cut wild grass and make brooms they sell at a fixed price.

== Development ==
The government had earlier provided electric current facility through wooden poles which lit 2 lamps in the village. But these wooden poles were burnt down due to a forest fire 25 years ago, and since then no electricity was accessible to the people here.

The Special Task Force (STF) of Tamil Nadu situated in Sathyamangalam had provided with two Solar Street Lamps before 5 years, when the hunt for the forest brigand Veerappan was at its peak. They also obtained permission to lay an approach road to the village but after the killing of Veerappan, the STF stopped visiting the village. Since then the lights were unattended and have malfunctioned. The road project resumed after a temporary halt, with the consent from the then District Forest Officer Mr. Ramasubramaniam IFS. However, nature activists have claimed that the attempts to lay road is a part of the illegal efforts by outsiders to deprive the natives of their lands and setup commercial resorts and farms, which may prove destructive to the wildlife and the forests. The issue was reported in the Times of India on 17 May 2013.

Recently, the villagers have also jointly purchased a diesel run electricity generator to light the village and play loudspeakers during festivals. It is also used occasionally to charge mobile phones and torch lights – which are the new arrivals to the village.

Almost every home today has a solar panel and a battery to power three lights.

== Flora and fauna ==
Pachyderms, wild boars and bears are a common sight for the people of village, who also recall the instances of sighting leopards occasionally.

Theku (Teak wood) and Nellikkaai (Indian gooseberry) are found in large numbers in the area. A number of fig trees (whose description the author does not know), quite a variety of shrubs and herbs are also found in the forest.

Flora and to a major extent aviary surveys are yet to be carried out to document the plant and birds species in the area.

== Other sources ==
- "PROJECT-LIGHTING MALLIAMMAN DURGAM". GIVE LIFE TO NEEDY AND TALENTED. 26 February 2004.
- Krishnamoorthy, R. (15 June 2016). "Sub-Collector's visit infuses hope among villagers". The Hindu.
- Krishnamoorthy, R. (10 July 2016). "Malli Amman Durgham residents start experiencing care and attention". The Hindu.
