= Sovereign ring =

Ring with a gold sovereign as its primary decorative feature

A sovereign ring is a ring which typically has a gold sovereign as a primary decorative feature, with the obverse face as the visible detail. The coin may be either genuine or replica tender, and may be either a sovereign or half sovereign.

Sovereign rings are associated with chav culture in the UK, or more broadly with emulating the look of a mafioso.

In the United Kingdom it is also common to use custom coinage bearing such motifs as the 'Three Lions' or other similar imagery such as Saint George, or a Welsh Dragon.

Notable people who have been observed wearing a sovereign ring include Brad Pitt, Ghislaine Maxwell and the English rapper Louise Amanda Harman, hence her stage name of "Lady Sovereign".
