= Ring watch =

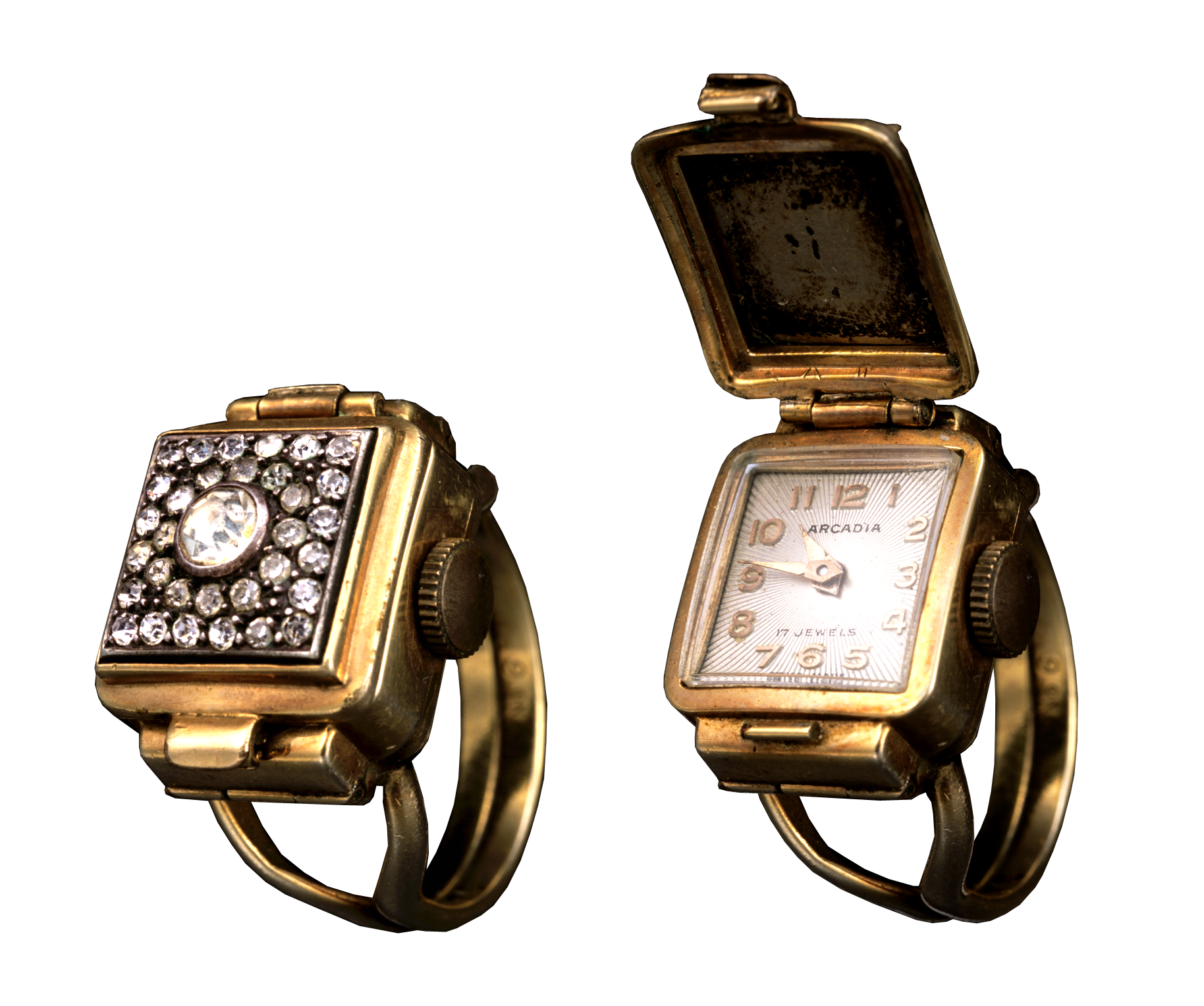
A ring watch

A ring watch or watch ring is a watch worn as a ring.

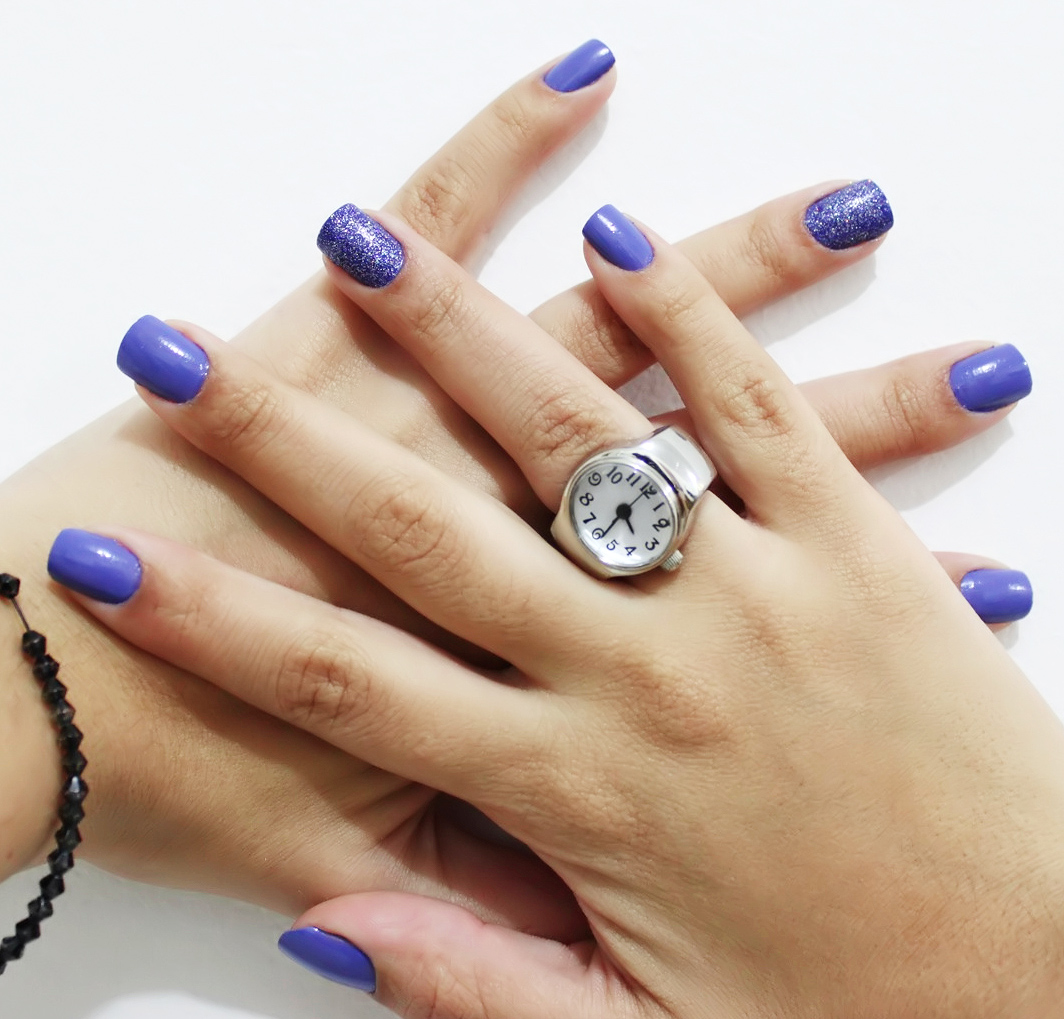
A ring watch being worn

== Manufacturers ==
Manufacturers of ring watches include Casio, Timex, Fossil, Diesel and Jaipur.

In 2024 Casio began selling a new ring watch. The company announced a new version in 2026 with new features such as health tracking.
