= Pre-engagement ring =

Ring symbolizing intent to wed

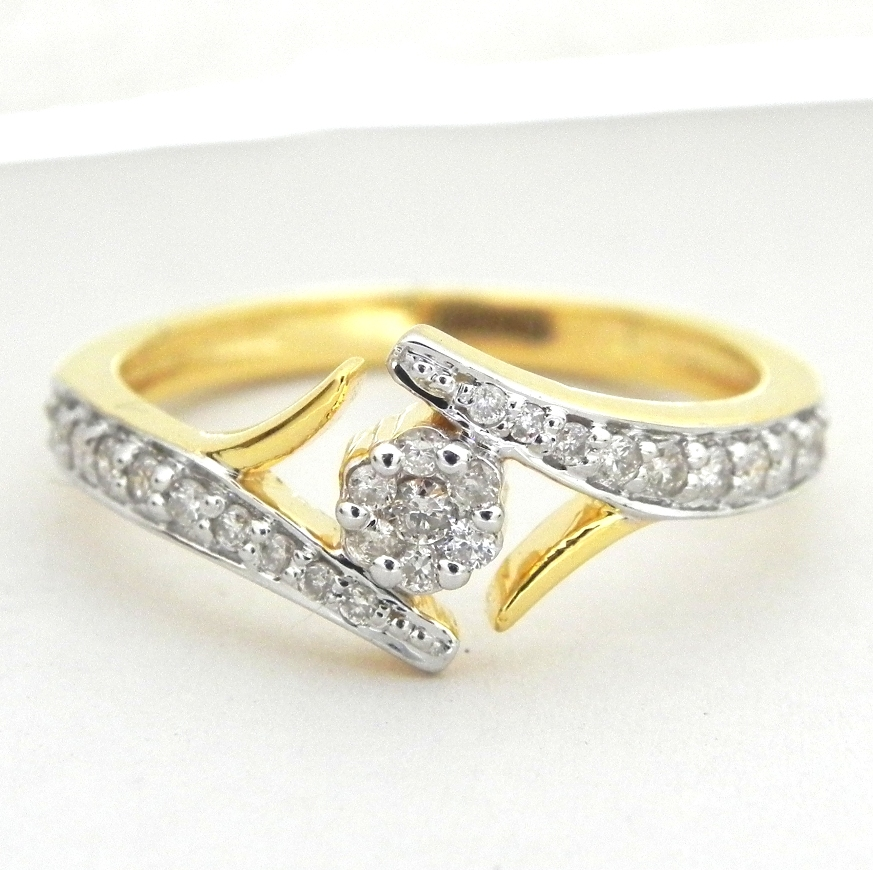
A pre-engagement ring, also called a promise ring or friendship ring

A pre-engagement ring, sometimes referred to as a friendship ring or promise ring, is a ring given as a gift to a romantic partner to signify a commitment to a monogamous relationship, often as a precursor to an engagement ring. While similar concepts have been employed in the past, the concept of pre-engagement rings came into prominence starting in the 1970s. It gained further prominence in the late 2000s when celebrities began to use pre-engagement rings (as well as purity rings) such as the Jonas Brothers, Katy Perry, and Selena Gomez.

== Appearance ==
Designs of pre-engagement rings may vary, featuring hearts, an entangled design, and other designs. However, any design can be used for a pre-engagement ring. The bands may be made of a variety of materials, including titanium, silver, and gold. Less common inexpensive materials may be used, such as wood, glass, ceramic, bone, plastic, jade, quartz or any other type of gemstone band ring. Birthstones are also commonly used. The ring or rings may be engraved with one or both of the names of those in the relationship, and potentially their nickname(s).

== Custom ==
A pre-engagement ring, sometimes referred to as a friendship ring or promise ring, is given to a romantic partner as a show of a commitment to a monogamous relationship as a precursor to an engagement ring. It is typically given after six months to a year of dating. In a heterosexual couple, the man is typically the one to give the ring, though it is not uncommon for the woman to give as well. Some couples may also exchange pre-engagement rings. Pre-engagement rings can be worn on any finger, though they're typically on the left ring finger. When a person gets married, if they still have their pre-engagement ring, they may switch the ring to their right ring finger. Since it is not an official engagement ring, it can be worn on any finger or even as a necklace. Often seen as a fashion accessory rather than a formal engagement or wedding ring, pre-engagement rings are generally more affordable due to the lower level of commitment and the younger age of the giver and recipient. They are commonly worn by individuals who are too young for engagement but wish to express their commitment, as well as by couples who prefer to take their time before marrying.

Pre-engagement rings are common in Brazil, and are sometimes worn by couples while they are dating. It is called a commitment ring (or anel de compromisso).

== History ==
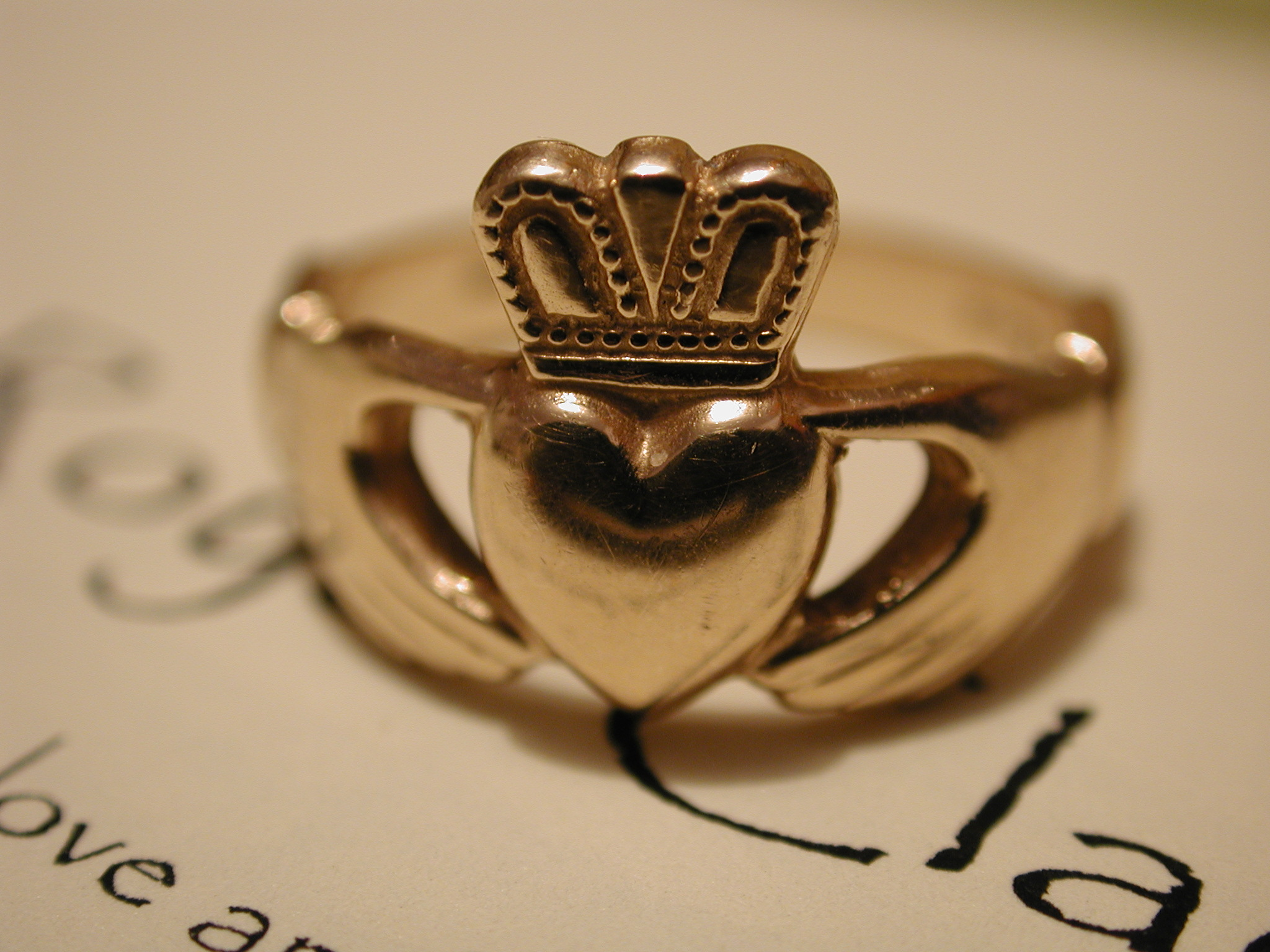
A Claddagh ring

Similar concepts to pre-engagement rings have appeared at various points in history. One such example is posie rings, which were engraved with romantic poems in 16th century England. Another example were acrostic rings, which spelled out a word in gemstones such as "regard" using a ruby, emerald, garnet, amethyst, another ruby, and a diamond. Claddagh rings are another similar kind of ring. The term 'promise ring' entered the "jewelry dictionary" in the 1970s.

== Impact ==
Pre-engagement rings entered prominence in the late 2000s and early 2010s. One of the reasons for the popularity of promise rings is the use by celebrities, including Jennifer Aniston and Kylie Jenner.

When Gym Class Heroes vocalist Travie McCoy gave his then-girlfriend Katy Perry a diamond promise ring in June 2008, it was widely reported because Perry was just starting her rise to prominence with the hit song "I Kissed a Girl." Perry told Steppin' Out magazine, "(People) think the promise ring means no sex! No, the promise ring is just a promise that he'll get me another ring. A better ring! Seriously, it's not one of those 'no sex' promise rings. That kind of went out the window when I was 17 years old."

Writer Nicole Fabian-Weber mocked the concept of pre-engagement rings in an article about a diamond-encrusted "J" ring that 17-year-old Justin Bieber gave to then-girlfriend Selena Gomez in February 2012. Writer Pascale Day expressed bemusement at the idea of a pre-engagement ring. She expressed confusion as to what it was and commented that 'pre-engagement' is just "being in a relationship." Writer Ana Gabriela Verotti Farah commented that due to the relative newness of the custom in Brazil in 2003, it resulted in trivialization by couples, especially young ones. Gomez stated that the gift wasn't a pre-engagement ring or a promise ring, but rather a friendship ring.

Some companies have made franchise-branded pre-engagement rings, such as Disney's Beauty and the Beast-branded promise rings. The rings feature Belle and 'Her Beast' on the boy's ring and Beast and 'His Beauty' on the girl's.
