= Kakute =

Ninja spiked ring weapons

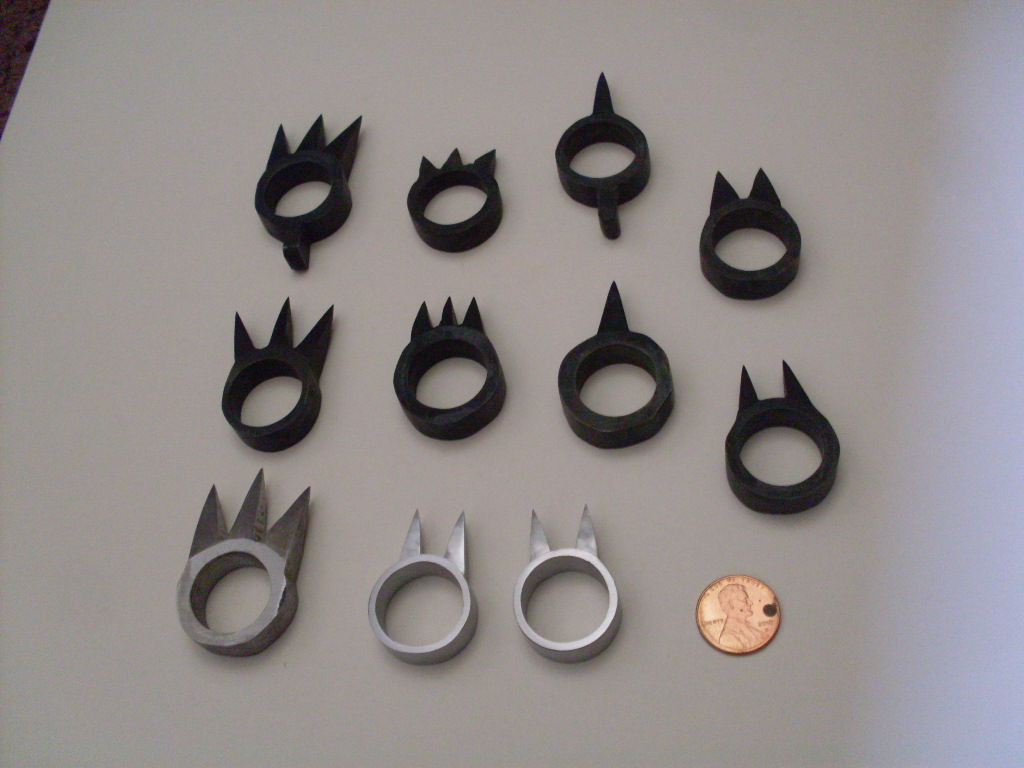
Kakute

Kakute (角手), also known as Kakushi (角指), are rings made from iron or steel that were sometimes worn by ninja, and were favored by the kunoichi, having one to four metal spikes protruding from it. The spikes were sometimes dipped in poison. Kakute were usually worn on the middle finger with the spikes hidden inside the hand, and then used to attack when the enemy least expected. The spikes were also excellent for holding onto an opponent, striking across the face, choking, and sometimes climbing as well. Some kakute had a tab with a hole, that was used for hojojutsu techniques. In this sense, the hojo (rope) could not be easily pulled away from the hands of the ninja or kunoichi, since it was tied to the kakute ring on their finger.

== See also ==
- Bagh nakh
