= Luckenbooth brooch =

Scottish heart-shaped brooch often with a crown above one or two hearts

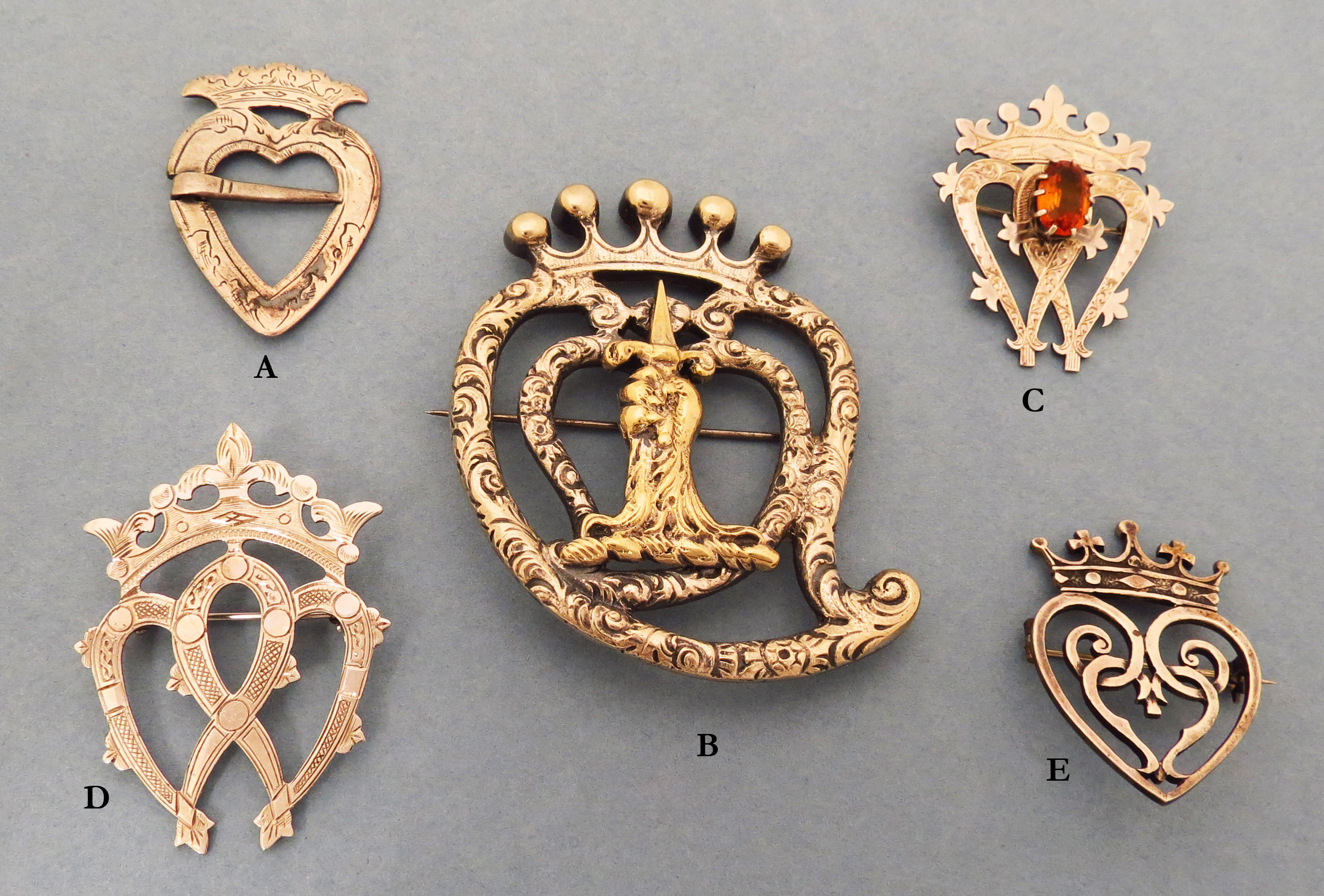
Scottish Luckenbooth brooches dating from the 18th to 20th centuries

A Luckenbooth brooch is a Scottish heart-shaped brooch. These brooches often have a crown above one heart, or two intertwined hearts. They are typically made of silver and may be engraved or set with stones.

The name comes from the Luckenbooths of Edinburgh, where jewellery and trinkets used to be sold, including this type of brooch. Luckenbooth is a Scots word for a lockable stall or workshop. The Edinburgh booths were situated on the Royal Mile near St Giles Cathedral. They were the city's first permanent shops, going back to the 15th century, and initially housing mainly silversmiths and goldsmiths. They were demolished in 1817.

The Luckenbooth brooch is a traditional Scottish love token: often given as a betrothal or wedding brooch. It might be worn by a nursing mother as a charm to help her milk flow, and/or be pinned to a baby's clothing to protect it from harm. It was known as a witch-brooch by people using it to save children from the evil eye.

The Luckenbooth brooch has motifs similar to the Claddagh ring, also using the heart and crown. Heart-shaped brooches in parts of Europe date back to late medieval times, but this design probably did not appear in Scotland before the 17th century.

Silver was the usual material, although gold heart brooches were made for wealthy people. Silver was commonly chosen for "lucky" charms, and was also an affordable metal for jewellery that was popular with poorer people. Inexpensive glass paste "gems" were sometimes used on silver Luckenbooth brooches, as were garnets and semi-precious stones. Some brooches were engraved with initials, dates or mottoes.

By the mid 18th century, Luckenbooth tokens also featured heavily as trade silver items to the indigenous peoples of the Eastern Woodlands, particularly the Iroquois of the Five Nations. As a result, Luckenbooth brooches also became a common decorative symbol in 18th and early 19th century native clothing.

One legend of the Luckenbooth brooch is that it was a symbol of love and devotion given by Mary Queen of Scots to Lord Darnley. Another story is that it was an engagement brooch given to her by the Dauphin of France whom she later married. It may feature Scottish motifs like the St. Andrew's Cross, or the thistle.

The Luckenbooth brooch has been a Scottish form of jewellery since the 19th century. The form was adapted to pebble jewellery in Victorian times, as well as being a regular feature in the ranges of most Scottish manufacturing jewellers who worked for the Highland outfitter and tourist trades.

== See also ==
- Scottish Indian trade
