= Richard Joyce (goldsmith) =

Irish goldsmith (c. 1660 – c. 1737)

Richard Joyce (c. 1660 – c. 1737) was an Irish goldsmith. Joyce was a member of one of the Tribes of Galway and is credited with the creation of the Claddagh Ring. While the exact details of Joyce's story cannot be verified, it aligns with historical events.

== Life ==
In 1675 he left Galway to serve as an indentured servant in the West Indies but his ship was intercepted by pirates from Algeria who enslaved the entire crew. Joyce became the enslaved to a Turkish man in Algiers, said to be a goldsmith, who made him his apprentice.

In 1689, William III became King of England and enforced a request upon the Algerians to release all of his subjects enslaved in the country. Joyce's master offered him half the business and his daughter's hand in marriage if he stayed, but he refused and returned to Galway. There, he is said to have created the original Claddagh ring. Examples of his work from the early 1700s are still extant. He settled near Rahoon, then outside the town, married and had three daughters.

Joyce's role in the creation of the ring is somewhat debatable. However, his designs seem to have been the most popular at the time, and perhaps the basis of the present design featuring the crown, so he can be credited as its creator.
