= Scarab ring =

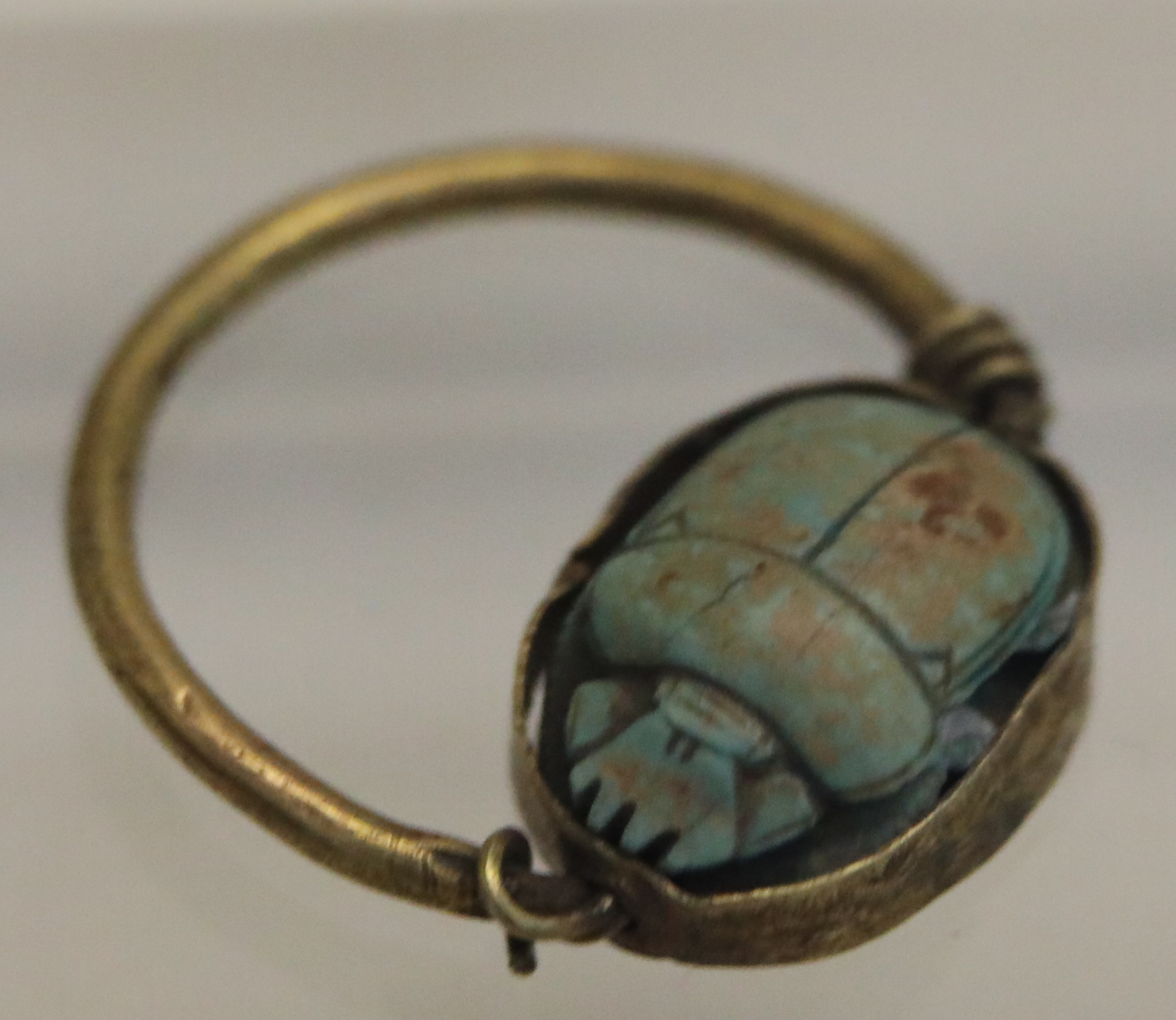
Scarab ring of Tuthmosis III

The Scarab ring is a style of finger ring featuring a small sculpture of a scarab as the bezel that was popular in the Egyptian Middle Kingdom and later. They generally incorporated an inscription on the base of the scarab but not always.

The bezel design was developed in the late Old Kingdom as a signet/amulet with the scarab representing the god Ra. Glazed steatite was the most popular material although where the scarab have been in damp conditions the glazing may not have survived until the present day. Originally they were tied to the fingers with thread but later gold wire, with coils patterned after the thread, was used. Scarab rings with thicker hoops developed during the Second Intermediate Period. The scarab itself was mounted with a gold wire running through its centre on which it could swivel. As well as gold silver was used.

A final development was during the Amarna Period where instead of being carved the scarab was cast as part of the ring. At the same time faience copies of the rings were made.
