= Bichuwa =

Bichwa
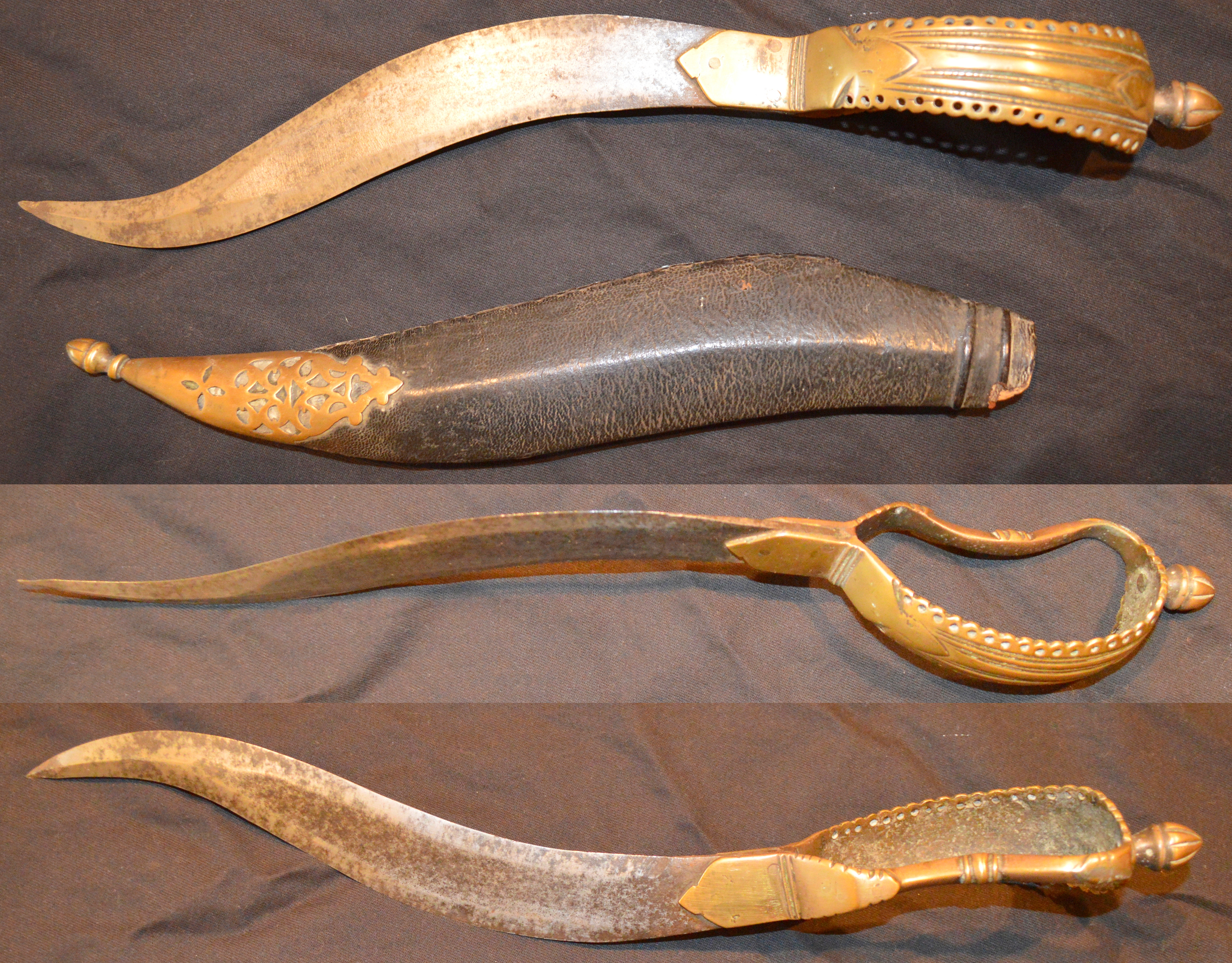
- Type: Dagger
- Place of origin: Indian subcontinent

The bichuwa or bichawa (pl. bichuwe) (Hindi: बिछुवा, Urdu: بچھوا) is a dagger, originating from the Indian subcontinent, with a loop hilt and a narrow undulating sharp blade. It is named for its resemblance to the sting of a scorpion, for which the Hindi name is bichuwa. The weapon was based on the maduvu, or horn dagger created in South India, and many bichuwa have blades which retain the shape of buffalo horns. Early examples of the bichuwa come from the medieval southern Karnataka empire of Vijayanagara. Being relatively easy to make, the bichuwa has persisted into the 20th century as a decorative dagger.

== Construction and use ==
The bichuwa usually has a narrow recurved blade and a simple looped handle, which may be cut with chevrons. It generally measures just over 30 cm (12 in). The handle sometimes loops into a knuckleguard. The all-metal hilt is often cast in one piece. Medieval bichuwas from southern India are typically decorated with the face of a protective yali (demon) on the hilt. Some have finials to the pommel or even protruding laterally as quillons or guards. A few bichuwa are forked or even double-bladed.

The weapon's small size meant it was easily concealed in a sleeve or waistband. A bichuwa was often combined with a bagh naka, either with the claws being added to the hilt of the bichuwa or the blade being added to one of the finger loops of the bagh nakha. The former type tended to be larger than the latter. This combination weapon, was used separately by the Maratha leader Chhatrapati Shivaji Maharaj to neutralize Afzal Khan in the 17th century. It is mistaken for the name "Bhavani" which was actually the name of his sword.

== See also ==
- Bagh nakha
