= Claddagh ring =

Traditional Irish ring

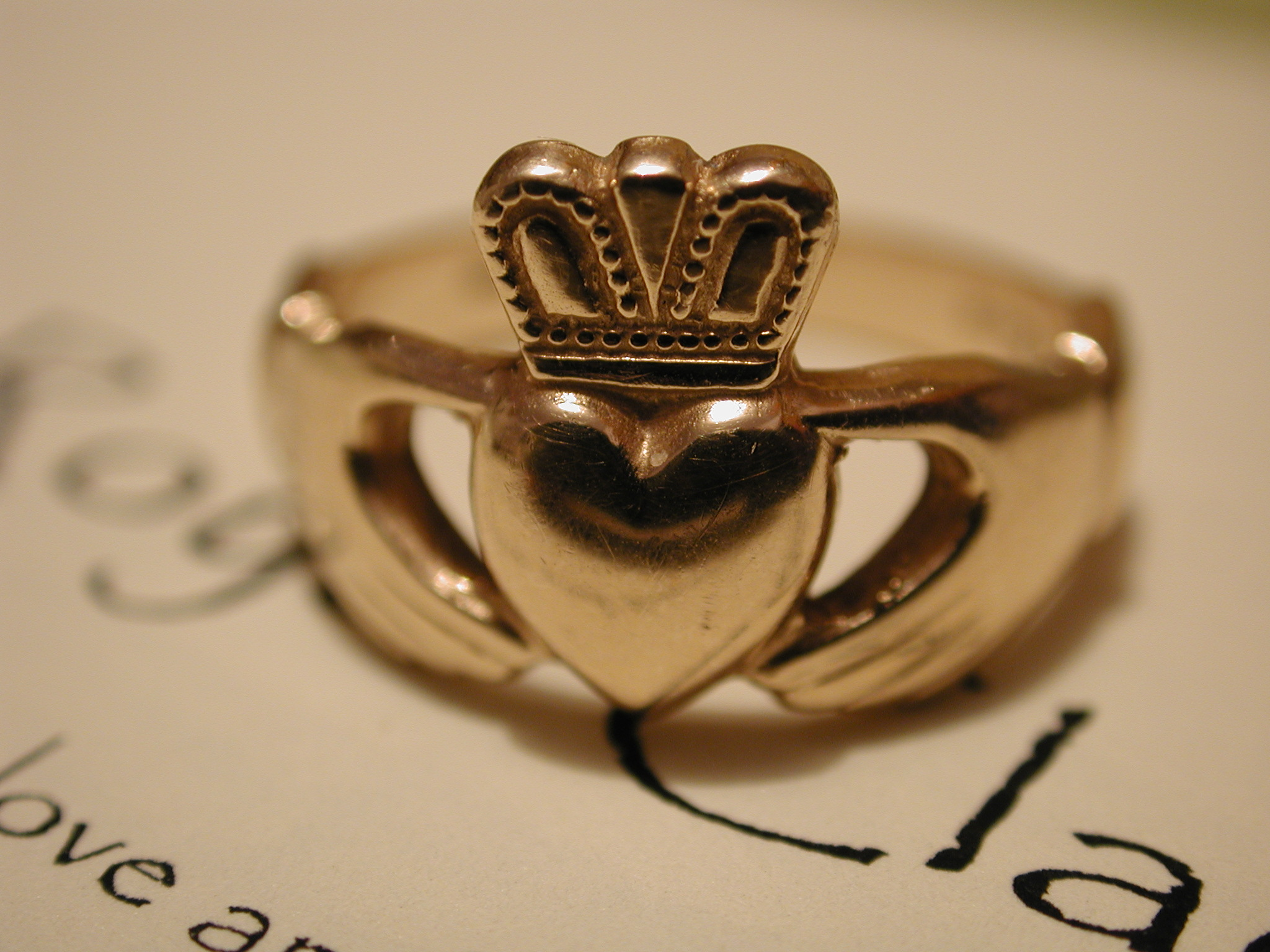
Claddagh ring

A Claddagh ring (Irish: fáinne an Chladaigh) is a traditional Irish ring with three primary features: a heart to represent love, a crown to represent loyalty, and two clasped hands to symbolise friendship. The design and customs associated with it originated in Claddagh, County Galway. Its modern form was first produced in the 17th century. Claddagh rings have been used as engagement and wedding rings in medieval and Renaissance Europe. The oldest surviving examples of the Claddagh ring were forged by Bartholomew Fallon.

== Description ==
The Claddagh ring belongs to a group of European finger rings called fede rings. The name derives from the Italian phrase mani in fede ('hands [joined] in faith' or 'hands [joined] in loyalty'). This ring group dates to Ancient Rome, where the gesture of clasping hands meant pledging vows. Cut or cast in bezels, they were used as engagement and wedding rings in medieval and Renaissance Europe to signify "plighted troth".

In recent years, it has been embellished with interlace designs and combined with other Celtic and Irish symbols, corresponding with its popularity as an emblem of Irish identity.

== Origins ==
Galway has produced Claddagh rings continuously since at least 1700, but the name Claddagh ring was not used before the 1830s. Although there are various myths and legends around the origin of the ring, it is almost certain that it originated in or close to the small fishing village of Claddagh in Galway.

There are many legends about the origins of the ring, particularly concerning Richard Joyce, a silversmith from Galway circa 1700, who is said to have invented the Claddagh design. Legend has it that Joyce was captured and enslaved by Algerian Corsairs around 1675 while on a passage to the West Indies; he was sold into slavery to a Moorish goldsmith who taught him the craft. King William III sent an ambassador to Algeria to demand the release of any and all British subjects who were enslaved in that country, which at the time would have included Joyce. After fourteen years, Joyce was released and returned to Galway and brought with him a ring he had fashioned while in captivity: what has come to be known as the Claddagh. He gave the ring to his sweetheart, married, and became a goldsmith with "considerable success". His initials are in one of the earliest surviving Claddagh rings. There are three other rings also made around that time bearing the mark of goldsmith Thomas Meade.

The Victorian-era antiquarian, Sir William Jones, described the Claddagh in his book Finger-Ring Lore, and gives Chambers' Book of Days as the source. Jones says:

The clasped hands [style ring] ... are ... still the fashion, and in constant use in [the] ... community [of] Claddugh [sic] at [County] Galway ... [They] rarely [intermarry] with others than their own people.

An account written in 1906 by William Dillon, a Galway jeweller, claimed that the Claddagh ring was worn in the Aran Isles, Connemara and beyond. Knowledge of the ring and its customs spread within Ireland and Britain during the Victorian period, and this is when its name became established. Galway jewellers began to market it beyond the local area in the 19th century. Further recognition came in the 20th century.

== Usage and symbolism ==
The Claddagh's distinctive design features two hands clasping a heart and usually surmounted by a crown. These elements symbolise the qualities of love (the heart), friendship (the hands), and loyalty (the crown). A Fenian Claddagh ring, without a crown, is a slightly different take on the design but has not achieved the level of popularity of the crowned version. Claddagh rings are relatively popular among the Irish and those of Irish heritage, such as Irish Americans, as cultural symbols and as friendship, engagement, and wedding rings.

While Claddagh rings are sometimes used as friendship rings, they are most commonly used as engagement and wedding rings. Mothers sometimes give these rings to their daughters when they come of age. Several mottos and wishes are associated with the ring, such as: "Let love and friendship reign". In Ireland, the United States, Canada, and other parts of the Irish diaspora, the Claddagh is sometimes handed down mother-to-eldest daughter or grandmother-to-granddaughter.

Relationship status
	Left hand	Right hand
Heart pointing in	Married	In a relationship
Heart pointing out	Engaged	Single

According to Irish author Colin Murphy, a Claddagh ring is traditionally worn to convey the wearer's relationship status:

1. On the right hand with the point of the heart toward the fingertips: the wearer is single and might be looking for love.
2. On the right hand with the point of the heart toward the wrist: the wearer is in a relationship; someone "has captured their heart".
3. On the left ring finger with the point of the heart toward the fingertips: the wearer is engaged.
4. On the left ring finger with the point of the heart toward the wrist: the wearer is married.

In both Ireland and the Irish diaspora, other localised variations and oral traditions involve the hand and the finger on which the Claddagh is worn. Folklore about the ring is relatively recent, not ancient, with the lore about them almost wholly based in oral tradition; there is "very little native Irish writing about the ring", hence, the difficulty today in finding any scholarly or non-commercial source that explains the traditional ways of wearing the ring.

== Modern usage ==
The Claddagh ring can be seen on the fingers of political figures, Hollywood icons, and literary figures. American presidents John F. Kennedy, Ronald Reagan and Bill Clinton have worn the ring. Kennedy and his wife received theirs on a trip to Galway in 1963. Reagan and Clinton both received the rings as a gift from Ireland. British royalty, such as Queen Victoria, King Edward VII, and Queen Alexandra, were seen wearing the Claddagh ring after 1849 when they traveled to Ireland. After visiting the island with his wife, Walt Disney was seen wearing the ring. It is also apparent on the Partners statue in Disney World. His ring is facing outward on the statue, although he was married.

The ring can be found on actors such as Maureen O'Hara and John Wayne, who received their rings during the movie The Quiet Man. Peter O'Toole and Daniel Day-Lewis have frequently been seen wearing the Claddagh ring, as well as Mia Farrow and Gabriel Byrne. Jim Morrison and Patricia Kennealy completed their Celtic wedding with Claddagh rings. Brothers Liam and Noel Gallagher of English rock band Oasis are of Irish heritage and have worn matching Claddagh rings over the years.

In the television show Buffy the Vampire Slayer, the ring is seen when Angel presents one to Buffy as a birthday present.

In the Irish detective television series Harry Wild (Season 3, Episode 6), a serial killer put Claddagh rings on the fingers of his victims.

== See also ==
- Ecclesiastical ring – Finger ring worn by clergy
- Luckenbooth brooch – Scottish heart-shaped brooch often with a crown above one or two hearts
- Pre-engagement ring – Ring symbolizing intent to wed
