= Pata (sword) =

South Asian sword

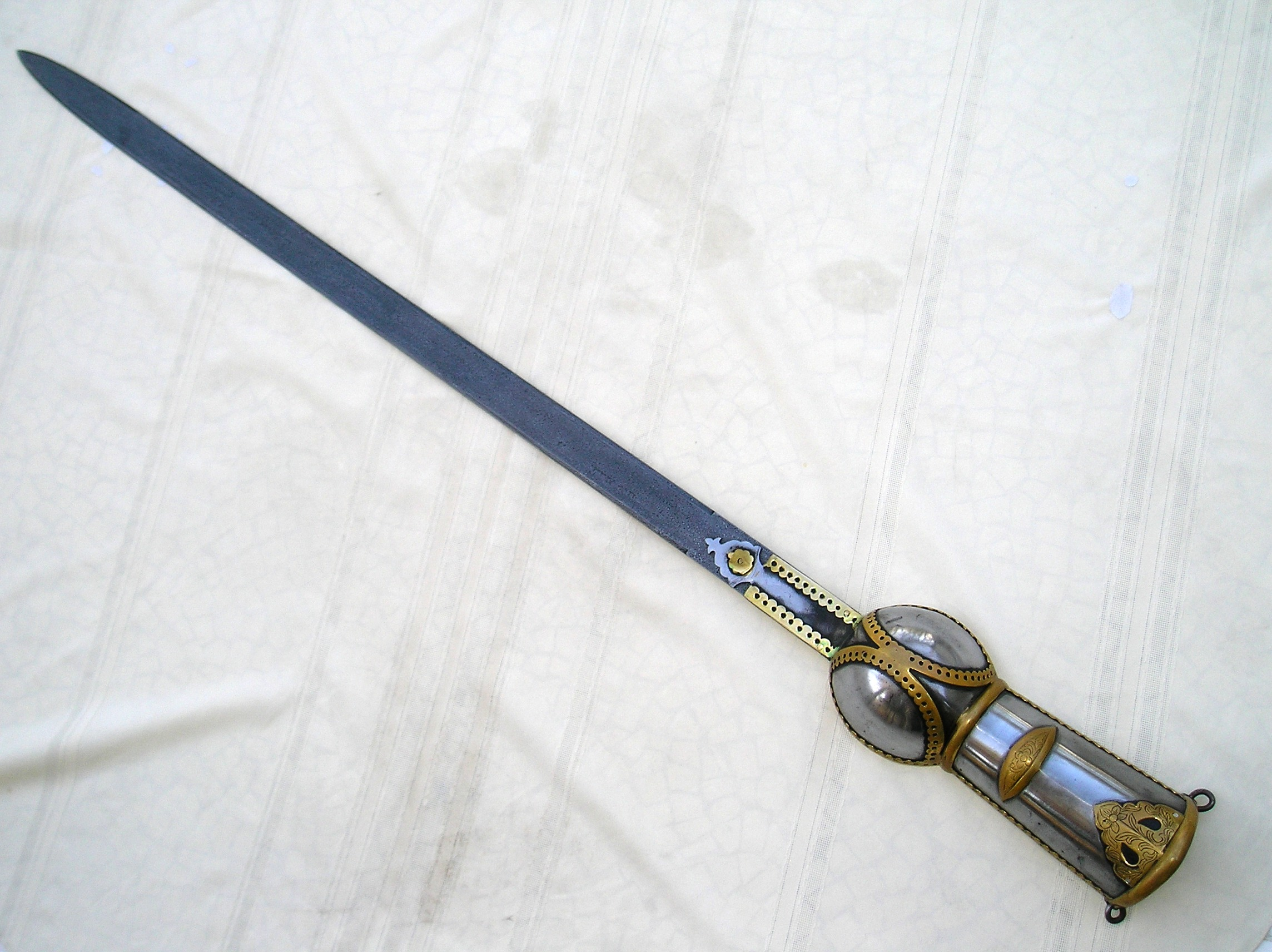
- An ornamental pata with a 41-inch (100 cm) blade
- Type: Sword
- Place of origin: Indian subcontinent

Service history
- Used by: Marathas

Specifications
- Length: 10–44 inches (25–112 cm)
- Blade type: Double-edged, straight
- Hilt type: Gauntlet type

The pata (Marathi: दांडपट्टा) is a sword, originating from the Indian subcontinent, with a gauntlet integrated as a handguard. Often referred to in its native Marathi as a dandpatta, it is commonly called a gauntlet sword in English.

== Description ==
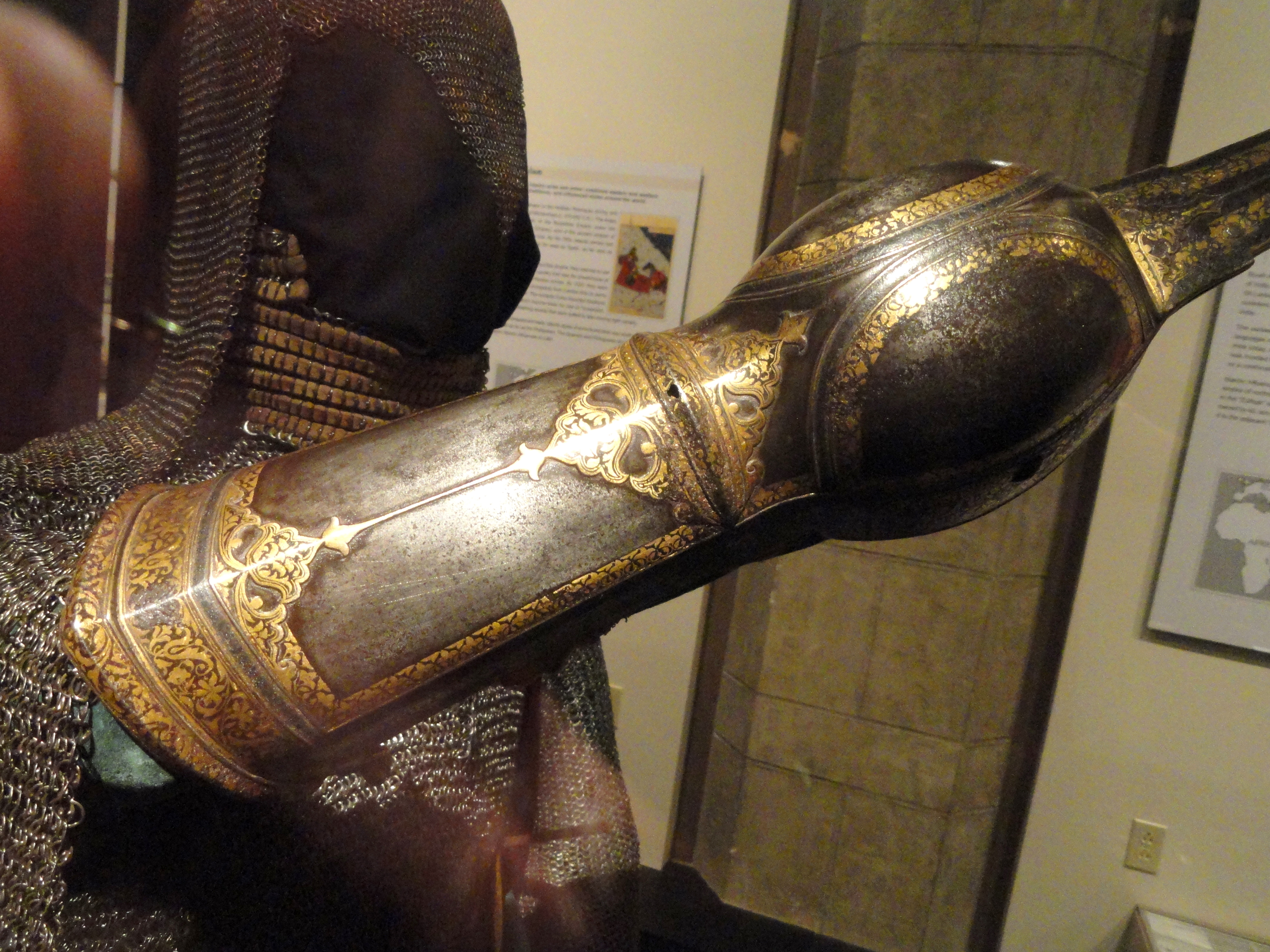
A well embossed gauntlet

The pata has a long straight blade ranging in length from 10 to 44 in (25 to 112 cm). The blades were locally made by native artisans.

The characteristic feature of the pata is its hilt which takes the form of a half-gauntlet, the inside of which is usually padded. The hilt is attached to the blade by decorative arms that extend forward on both sides of the blade.

The Mughals developed a variation with matchlock pistols adjoining the handle. The hilt also has a long cuff which is usually decorated and in older examples inlaid and embellished with gold and silver. The swordsman holds the weapon by gripping a crossbar inside the gauntlet. The cuff is held close to the forearm by another bar or chain.

== History ==
Created in Medieval India, the pata's use in warfare appears to be mostly restricted to the 17th and 18th century when the Maratha Empire came into prominence. It was considered to be a highly effective weapon for infantrymen against heavily armoured cavalry. The Maratha ruler Shivaji I and his general Baji Prabhu Deshpande were reputedly trained in the use of the pata. When Mughal Afzal Khan's bodyguard Sayyid Banda attacked Shivaji with swords in the Battle of Pratapgad, Shivaji's bodyguard Jiva Mahala fatally struck him down, cutting off one of Sayyad's hands with a pata.

Recent discovery of Hero stone inscriptions has pushed back the antiquity of the pata to the 12th century.

== Use ==
The pata is most commonly paired with either a shield or another pata, though it can also be used with a javelin, axe, or belt. The restrictive handle was particularly suited to the stiff-wristed style of South Asian swordsmanship. Despite its shape, the pata is used primarily for cutting rather than thrusting. The extended grip provided by the forearm permits powerful slashes but restricts any thrusts. This can be seen in mardani khel today and in colonial descriptions which describe spinning techniques with dual pata "much like a windmill".

Miniature paintings show that the pata was also wielded by mounted cavalry, which has led some modern collectors to erroneously conclude that the weapon was used for thrusting from horseback. However, the restriction on wrist movement would have made it difficult to dislodge the pata from an opponent's body, and doing so while mounted would most likely cause the swordsmen to fall off their horses. Rather, it is more probable that the pata was used in cut-and-run tactics, characteristic of the Maratha army. Cutting technique was practiced by slicing fruit on the ground like lemons or limes without touching the ground. This was and still is a common method of demonstration, often using a flexible blade to facilitate the trick. It is said that Maratha warriors would swing the pata in circular movement like whirlwind when encircled before they fell, so as to maximise the casualties on the opposition. It was to be effective when two soldiers fought together as pairs.

== See also ==
- Basket-hilted sword, similar guarding concept
- Chakram
- Gatka
- Katar
- Scissor (gladiator)
