= Bagh nakh =

Vagh nakh
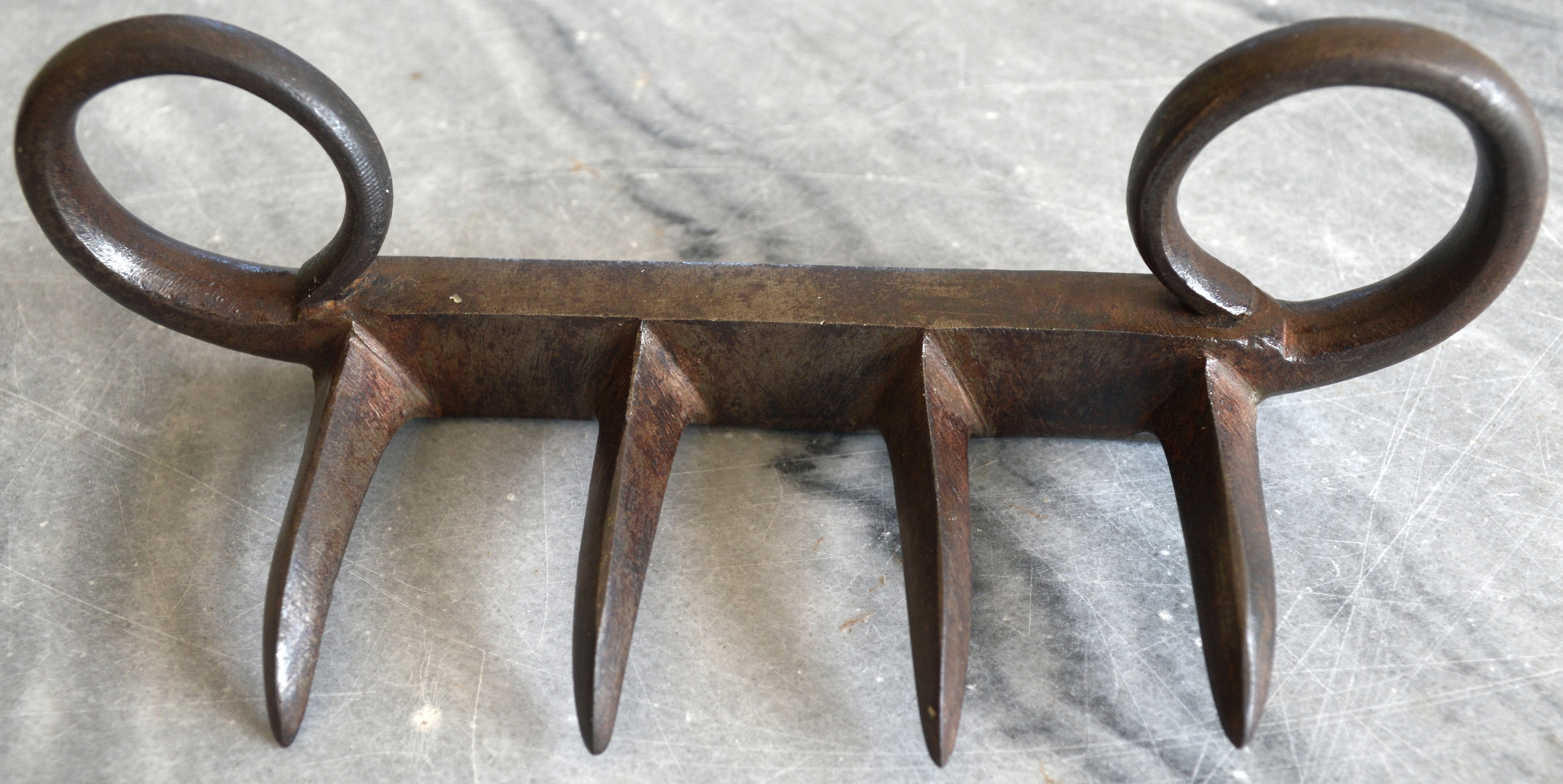
- Type: Claws
- Place of origin: Indian subcontinent

The bagh nakh, vagh nakh, or vagh nakhya (Marathi: वाघनख / वाघनख्या, Bengali: বাঘনখ, Hindi: बाघ नख, Urdu: باگھ نکھ, lit. tiger claw) is a fist-load, claw-like dagger, originating from the Indian subcontinent, designed to fit over the knuckles or be concealed under and against the palm. It consists of four or five curved blades affixed to a crossbar or glove and is designed to slash through skin and muscle. It is believed to have been inspired by the armament of big cats, and the term bagh nakh itself means tiger's claw in Hindi.

== History ==
There are conflicting reports of the time period in which the bagh nakh first appeared. Poisoned bagh nakh had been used by the Rajput clans for assassinations. The most well-known usage of the weapon was by the first Maratha emperor Shivaji who used a bichuwa and bagh nakh to kill the Bijapur general Afzal Khan.

It is a popular weapon among the Nihang Sikhs who wear it in their turbans and often hold one in their left hand while wielding a larger weapon such as a sword in the right hand. It is recommended that Nihang women carry a bagh nakh when going alone to dangerous areas. The Nihangs also have a number of traditional weapons one of them being the Sher-Panja (literally - lion's paw) which is inspired by the bagh nakh. Instead of going in between the gaps in the fingers the Sher panja goes over the wrist and fingers and has claws coming out.

While often associated with thieves and assassins, the bagh nakh was also used by wrestlers in a form of fighting called naki ka kusti or "claw wrestling" which persisted even under British colonial rule. M. Rousselete, who visited Baroda in 1864, described "naki-ka-kausti" as one of the raja's favourite forms of entertainment.

"The weapons, fitted into a kind of handle, were fastened by thongs to the closed right hand. The men, drunk with bhang or Indian hemp, rushed upon each other and tore like tigers at face and body; forehead-skins would hang like shreds; necks and ribs were laid open, and not infrequently one or both would bleed to death. The ruler's excitement on these occasions often grew to such a pitch that he could scarcely restrain himself from imitating the movements of the duellists."

After the Direct Action Day riots, the Bengali Hindu girls, in order to defend themselves, began to wear a kind of sharp weapon resembling bagh nakh while going to school.

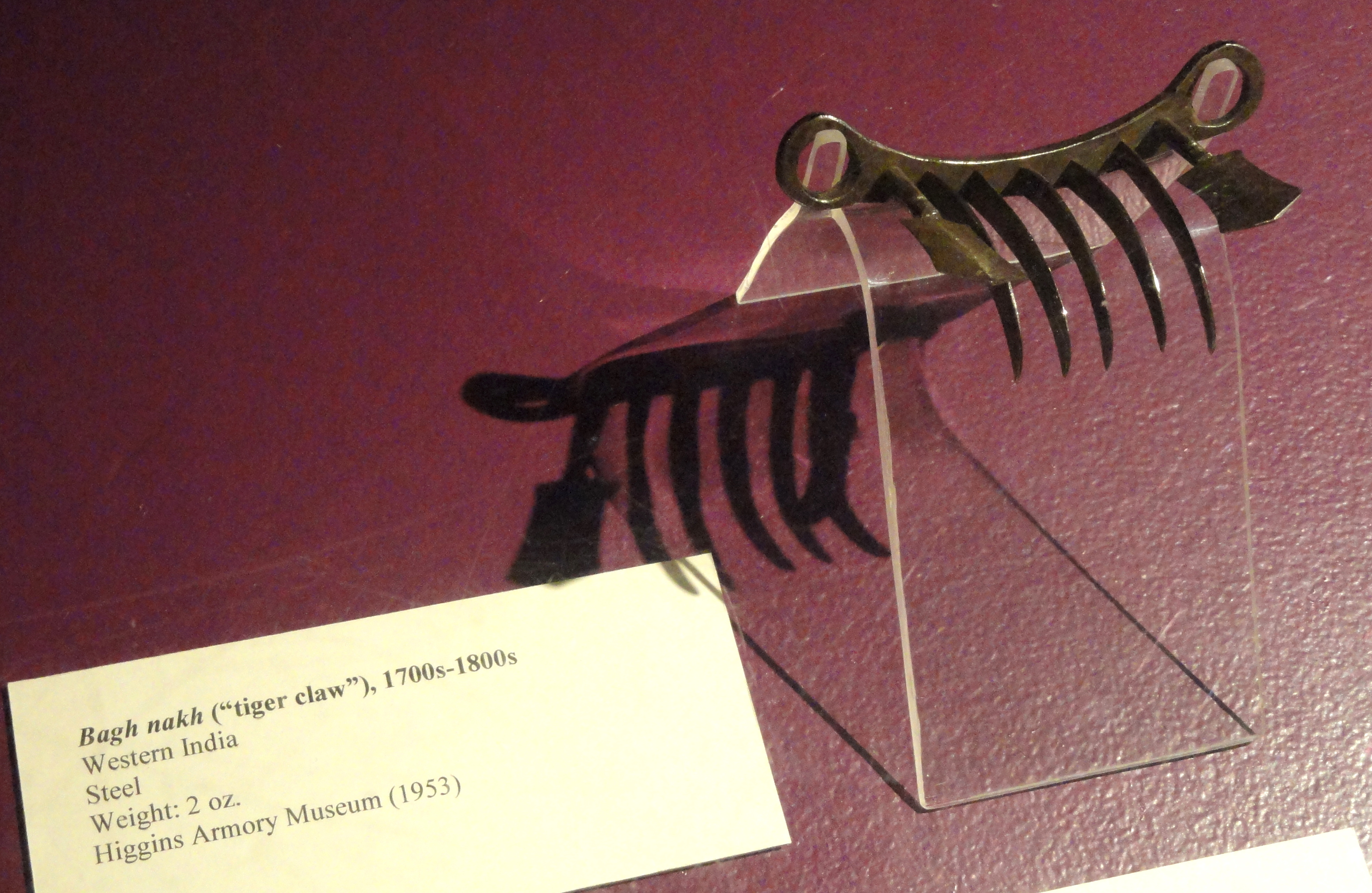
Bagh nakh (tiger claw), western India, 1700s-1800s - Higgins Armory Museum

In the Walt Disney movie, Aladdin and the King of Thieves, the main movie's antagonist, Sa'luk, wields this kind of weapon, made of gold.

== Variant construction ==
Several variations of bagh nakh exist, including one in which the single crossbar is replaced by two plates hinged together; with an additional loop and claw for the thumb. Earliest bagh nakh did not utilize loops for the fingers, rather round holes were punched through the central plate. Many bagh nakh also incorporated a spike or blade on one end of the crossbar. This form was known as a bichuwa bagh nakh because the blade was based on that of the bichuwa (scorpion dagger).

== See also ==
- Brass knuckles
- Karambit
- Kakute
- Vajra-mushti
