= Orthosomnia =

Medical term for obsession with perfect sleep

Orthosomnia is a term used to describe a situation where a person becomes overly focused on the sleep data shown by a sleep tracking device. Instead of helping them sleep better, this concern with getting the "right" sleep score or number can make them more anxious and may even contribute to insomnia. It is not currently recognised as a formal medical diagnosis, but it is often discussed in relation to sleep anxiety and the growing use of wearable technology. People experiencing orthosomnia may trust their sleep tracker more than how rested they actually feel, which can lead them to worry about whether they have slept well enough.

== Origin of the term ==
The term orthosomnia was first used by researchers from Rush University Medical College and Northwestern University's Feinberg School of Medicine in a 2017 case study published in the Journal of Clinical Sleep Medicine titled: "Orthosomnia: Are Some Patients Taking the Quantified Self Too Far?", which described three patients who had become highly focused on the sleep results shown by their tracking devices. The researchers used the term to describe a connection between the idea of "correct" sleep and the anxiety caused by trying to achieve it.

In the case study, the patients spent too much time in bed in an attempt to improve their sleep numbers, but this may have made their insomnia worse. Dr Sabra Abbott, an assistant professor of neurology at Northwestern University involved in the study, later explained that these patients did not always match the usual description of insomnia, but their concern about tracker data was still keeping them awake.

== Role of wearable devices ==
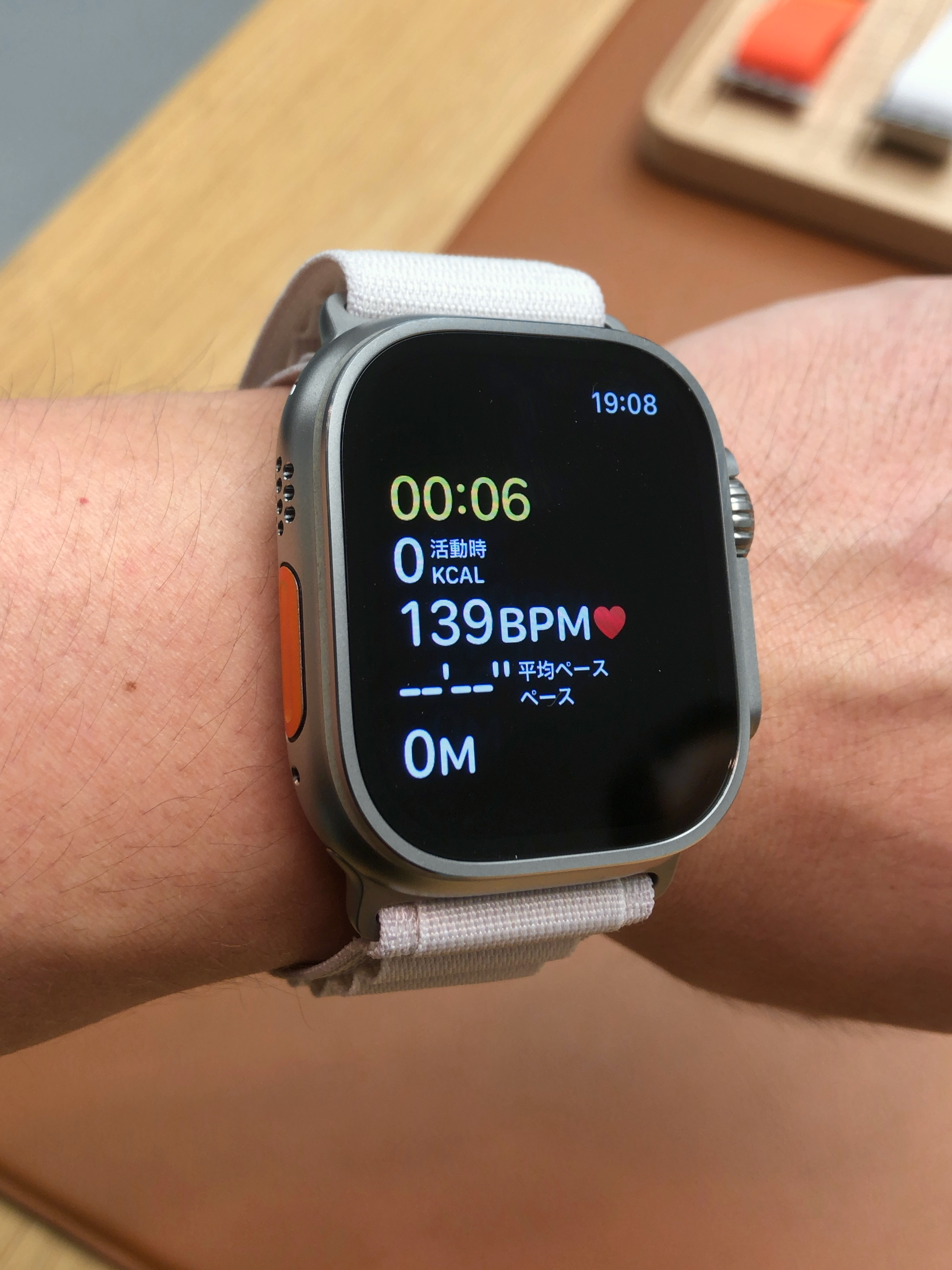
Apple watch with health data.

Wearable devices play an important role in orthosomnia because they make sleep easy to measure and check. Smartwatches, smart rings, sleep-tracking bands and mobile apps often present sleep as a set of numbers like: total sleep time, sleep stages, sleep efficiency and a sleep score. Devices such as the Apple Watch and Oura Ring use sensors to estimate sleep from signals such as movement, heart rate and body temperature, while some apps use these results to give daily summaries and trends. This can be useful for noticing patterns, but it can also make people focus too closely on whether they have achieved a "good" night of sleep.

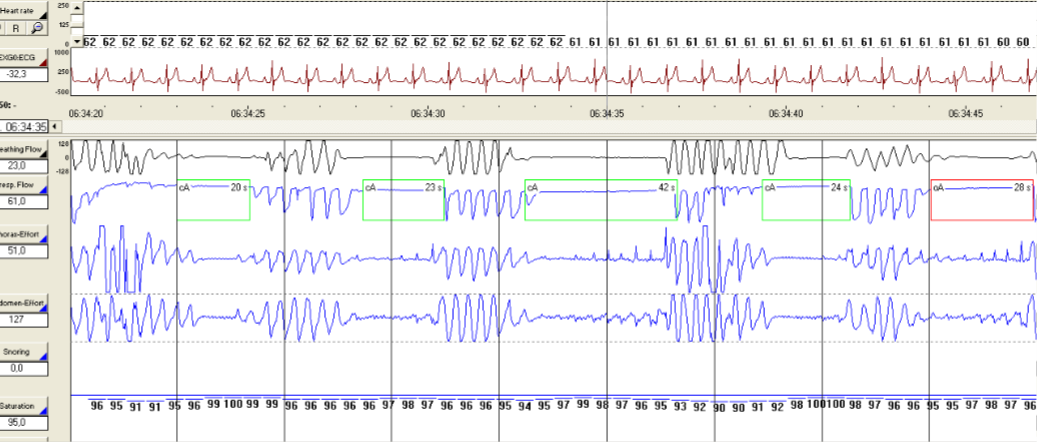
Polysomnography in a patient with obstructive sleep apnea

A key issue is that most consumer sleep trackers do not measure sleep in the same way as a medical sleep study. Clinical polysomnography records brain activity, eye movement and muscle activity, while many wearable devices estimate sleep indirectly from body signals. Studies have found that consumer devices can be good at detecting when a person is asleep, but are usually less reliable at detecting wakefulness or identifying exact sleep stages. This means that a person may feel rested, but become worried because an app reports poor sleep or they may stay in bed longer to improve a score.

== Symptoms and behaviours ==
Some common behaviours include:

- checking sleep scores immediately after waking.
- changing bedtime routines (to optimise presented sleep score).
- spending excessive time in bed (to improve tracking data).
- feeling disappointed with 'bad' sleep reports.

These repeated behaviours can create a cycle where sleep becomes something to monitor and control rather than something that happens naturally. Researchers have described orthosomnia as an obsessive pursuit of ideal sleep, linked to the belief that a tracker can show whether sleep has been successful or unsuccessful.

=== Relationship to Insomnia ===
Orthosomnia is closely related to insomnia because worry about sleep can make falling asleep difficult. Thus, the result of excessive behaviours can link so similar symptoms as insomnia such as:

- Fatigue.
- Irritability.
- Anxiety.
- Concentration and/or memory issues.

== Clinical Recommendations ==
Sleep experts therefore suggest using wearable data as a rough guide to longer-term sleep patterns, rather than as a perfect judgement of one night's sleep. People who are worried about their sleep data are advised to speak with a doctor or sleep specialist, as a professional can help interpret the information and decide whether a formal sleep study is needed. This is important because orthosomnia may occur alongside other sleep disorders that a tracker cannot reliably detect.

Recommended ways to manage orthosomnia are improving sleep hygiene or reducing stress/anxiety. Furthermore, cognitive behavioural therapy can be used in cases where sleep problems persist. Overall, the main clinical advice is not to ignore sleep data completely, but to avoid treating it as more important than personal wellbeing or as medical guidance.

== See also ==
- Orthorexia nervosa
