= Vandrico =

Vandrico Solutions Inc. (Vandrico)
- Type: Private
- Industry: Computer hardware, Computer software, IT services, IT consulting
- Founded: North Vancouver, British Columbia, Canada (March 15, 2011; 15 years ago)
- Number of employees: 10-50
- Website: vandrico.com

Vandrico, or Vandrico Solutions Inc. was a Canadian technology company located in North Vancouver, British Columbia. The company develops and licenses software for industrial and commercial operations worldwide. In 2013, Vandrico helped pioneer the use of wearable technology in traditional industries, such as mining. The company is best known for its database of wearable technology and its Connected Worker software platform that enables ease of interoperability between legacy and new enterprise systems.

== Wearables in Industrial Operations ==
On January 28, 2014 Vandrico announced a joint project with Motion Metrics International to extend their existing Payload Monitoring systems into wearable devices.

On July 14, 2016 Vandrico announced a partnership with Deloitte to increase employee efficiency using wearable technology using their Connected Worker platform.

In May of 2017 Vandrico launched its enterprise deployment-ready v4.0 of the Connected Worker(CW) software platform. CW is an open data platform, easily interoperable with disparate systems and new devices. It is meant to ease innovation for traditional industries like mining, oil & gas, utilities and construction.

In May of 2018 Vandrico began to support many safe productivity use cases in industrial operations including automated work order dispatch, short interval control, ventilation on demand, and fatigue management.

== Media Attention ==
On February 13, 2014 Vandrico launched their wearable technology database which was featured by TechCrunch the following day, and subsequently re-blogged many times by other publications.

In the summer of 2013 Vandrico received media attention for their work as one of the first Canadian companies to develop software for Google Glass.

== Acquisition ==
The company was acquired by an undisclosed buyer early in 2019.
