= Biomechanics of sprint running =

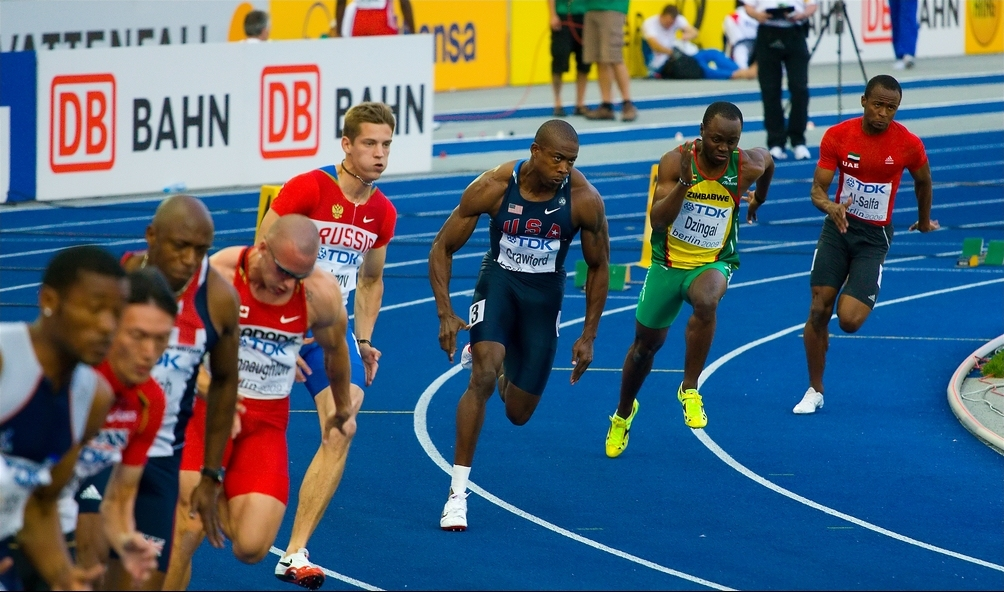
Sprinters during a 200 m race

Sprinting involves a quick acceleration phase followed by a velocity maintenance phase. During the initial stage of sprinting, the runners have their upper body tilted forward in order to direct ground reaction forces more horizontally. As they reach their maximum velocity, the torso straightens out into an upright position. The goal of sprinting is to reach and maintain high top speeds to cover a set distance in the shortest possible time. A lot of research has been invested in quantifying the biological factors and mathematics that govern sprinting. In order to achieve these high velocities, it has been found that sprinters have to apply a large amount of force onto the ground to achieve the desired acceleration, rather than taking more rapid steps. Velocity (v) = Stride Length (l) ×Stride Frequency (f).

== Quantifying sprinting mechanics and governing equations ==
Human legs during walking have been mechanically simplified in previous studies to a set of inverted pendulums, while distance running (characterized as a bouncing gait) has modeled the legs as springs. Until recently, it had been long believed that faster sprinting speeds are promoted solely by physiological features that increase stride length and frequency; while these factors do contribute to sprinting velocities, it has also been found that the runner's ability to produce ground forces is also very important. Although the spring-mass model helps explain aspects of sprinting, it has limitations when applied to acceleration. It does not fully explain the mechanics involved when a sprinter is increasing speed, and researchers point out that a model describing movement does not necessarily explain how the body actually produces it (Haugen et al., 2019).

Weyand et al. (2000) came up with the following equation for determining sprint velocity:

$$V=f_\text{step} F_\text{avg}/W_\text{b} L_\text{c},$$

where $V$ is the sprint velocity (m/s), $f_\text{step}$the step frequency (1/s), $F_\text{avg}$ the average force applied to the ground (N), $W_\text{b}$ the body weight (N), and $L_\text{c}$ the contact length (m).

In short, sprint velocity is reliant on three main factors: step frequency (how many steps you can take per second), average vertical force applied to the ground, and contact length (distance your center of mass translates over the course of one contact period). The formula was tested by having subjects run on a force treadmill (which is a treadmill that contains a force plate to measure ground reaction forces (GRF)). Figure 1 shows approximately what the force plate readout looks like for the duration of three steps. While this equation has proved to be fairly accurate, the study was limited in the sense that data was collected by a force plate that only measured vertical GRF rather than horizontal GRF. This led some people to the false pretense that simply exerting a greater vertical (perpendicular) force to the ground would lead to greater acceleration, which is far from correct (See Morin studies below).

In 2005, Hunter et al. conducted a study that determined relationships between sprint velocity and relative impulses in which gait and ground reaction force data was collected and analyzed. It was found that during accelerated runs, a typical support phase is characterized by a breaking phase followed by a propulsive phase (-FH followed by + FH). A common trend in the fastest subjects tested was that there was only a moderate to low amount of vertical force and a large amount of horizontal forces produced. Post study, it was hypothesized by the author that braking forces are necessary to store elastic energy in muscle and tendon tissue. This study loosely confirmed the importance of horizontal as well as vertical GRF during the acceleration phase of sprinting. Unfortunately, since data were collected at the 16-m mark, it was insufficient to draw definite conclusions regarding the entire acceleration phase.

During the transition phase, both propulsive force and braking duration play a part in sprint speed. Research has found that greater propulsive force is correlated with better performance, and vice versa.

Morin et al. (2011) performed a study to investigate the importance of ground reaction forces by having sprinters run on a force treadmill that measured both horizontal and vertical ground reaction forces. Belt velocity was measured for each step and calculations were performed to find the “index of force application technique”, which determines how well subjects are able to apply force in the horizontal direction.

The second half of the test involved subjects performing a 100-m sprint on a man-made track using radar to measure the forward speed of runners to create velocity-time curves. The main result of this study showed that the force application technique (rather than simply the total amount of force applied) is the key determinant factor in predicting a sprinter's velocity. This has yet to be integrated into the governing equation of sprinting.

== Kinetics ==
The kinetics of running describes the motion of a runner using the effects of forces acting on or out of the body. The majority of contributing factors to internal forces comes from leg muscle activation and arm swing.

=== Leg Muscle Activation ===
The muscles responsible for accelerating the runner forward are required to contract with increasing speed to accommodate the increasing velocity of the body. During the acceleration phase of sprinting, the contractile component of muscles is the main component responsible for the power output. Once a steady state velocity has been reached and the sprinter is upright, a sizable fraction of the power comes from the mechanical energy stored in the ‘series elastic elements’ during stretching of the contractile muscles that is released immediately after the positive work phase. As the velocity of the runner increases, inertia and air resistance effects become the limiting factors on the sprinter's top speed.

The soleus and gastrocnemius muscles play different roles during sprinting. The soleus mainly helps support the body by producing upward impulse, while the gastrocnemius is apart of both forward propulsion and upward support. The ankle's contribution to power production also changes throughout the acceleration phase (Crotty et al., 2024).

It was previously believed that there was an intramuscular viscous force that increased proportionally to the velocity of muscle contraction that opposed the contractile force; this theory has since been disproved.

In a study conducted in year 2004, the gait patterns of distance runners, sprinters, and non-runners was measured using video recording. Each group ran a 60-meter run at 5.81 m/s (to represent distance running) and at maximal running speed. The study showed that non-sprinters ran with an inefficient gait for the maximal speed trial while all groups ran with energetically efficient gaits for the distance trial. This indicates that the development of an economical distance running form is a natural process while sprinting is a learned technique that requires practice.

=== Arm Swing ===
Contrary to the findings of Mann et al. (1981), arm swing plays a vital role in both stabilizing the torso and vertical propulsion. Regarding torso stabilization, arm swing serves to counterbalance the rotational momentum created by leg swing, as suggested by Hinrichs et al. (1987). In short, the athlete would have a hard time controlling the rotation of their trunk without arm swing.

The same study also suggested that, as opposed to popular belief, the horizontal force production capabilities of the arms are limited due to the backward swing that follows the forward swing, so the two components cancel each other out. This is not to suggest, however, that arm swing does not contribute to propulsion at all during sprinting; in fact, it can contribute up to 10% of the total vertical propulsive forces that a sprinter can apply to the ground. The reason for this is that, unlike the forward-backward motion, both arms are synchronized in their upward-downward movement. As a result, there is no cancellation of forces. Efficient sprinters have an arm swing that originates from the shoulder and has a flexion and extension action that is of the same magnitude of the flexion and extension occurring at the ipsilateral shoulder and hip.

== Energetics ==
Di Prampero et al. mathematically quantifies the cost of the acceleration phase (first 30 m) sprint running through experimental testing. The subjects sprinted repeatedly on a track while radar determined their velocity. Additionally, it has been found in previous literature that the energetics of sprinting on flat terrain is analogous to uphill running at a constant speed. The mathematical derivation process is loosely followed below:

In the initial phase of sprint running, the total acceleration acting on the body ($g'$) is the vectoral sum of the forward acceleration and earth's acceleration due to gravity:

$$g'=((a_\text{f}^2+g^2))^{0.5}$$

The “Equivalent slope” (ES) when sprinting on flat ground is:

$$\text{ES} = \tan\left(90-\arctan\left(g+a_\text{f}\right)\right)$$

The “Equivalent normalized body mass” (EM) is then found to be:

$$\text{EM}=\frac{g'}{g}=\left[\left(\frac{a_\text{f}^2}{g^2} +1\right)\right]^{0.5}$$

Following the data collection, the cost of sprinting ($C_\text{sr}$) was found to be:

$$C_\text{sr}=((155.4\,\text{ES})^5-(30.4\,\text{ES})^4-(43.3\,\text{ES})^3+(46.3\,\text{ES})^2+19.5\,\text{ES} + 3.6)\,\text{EM}$$

The above equation does not take wind resistance into account, so considering the cost of running against wind resistance ($C_\text{aer}$), which is known to be:

$$C_\text{aer}=k' v^2$$

We combine the two equations to arrive at:

$$C_\text{sr}=((155.4\,\text{ES})^5-(30.4\,\text{ES})^4-(43.3\,\text{ES})^3+(46.3\,\text{ES})^2+19.5\,\text{ES} + 3.6)\,\text{EM} +k' v^2$$

Where $g'$ is the acceleration of the runner's body, $a_\text{f}$ the forward acceleration, $g$ the acceleration of gravity, $k'$ a proportionality constant and $v$ the velocity.

== Fatigue effects ==
Fatigue is a prominent factor in sprinting, and it is already widely known that it hinders maximal power output in muscles, but it also affects the acceleration of runners in the ways listed below.

=== Submaximal muscle coordination ===
A study on muscle coordination in which subjects performed repeated 6-second cycling sprints, or intermittent sprints of short duration (ISSD) showed a correlation between decrease in maximal power output and changes in motor coordination. In this case, motor coordination refers to the ability to coordinate muscle movements in order to optimize a physical action, so submaximal coordination indicates that the muscles are no longer activating in sync with one another. The results of the study showed that a delay between the vastus lateralis (VL) and biceps femoris (BF) muscles. Since there was a decrease in power during ISSD occurring in tandem with changes in VL-BF coordination, it is indicated that changes in inter-muscle coordination is one of the contributing factors for the reduced power output resulting from fatigue. This was done using bicycle sprinting, but the principles carry over to sprinting from a runner's perspective.

=== Hindrance of effective force application techniques ===
Morin et al. explored the effects of fatigue on force production and force application techniques in a study where sprinters performed four sets of five 6 second sprints using the same treadmill setup as previously mentioned. Data was collected on their ability to produce ground reaction forces as well as their ability to coordinate the ratio of ground forces (horizontal to vertical) to allow for greater horizontal acceleration. The immediate results showed a significant decrease in performance with each sprint and a sharper decrease in rate of performance depreciation with each subsequent data set. During deceleration, step frequency tends to decrease while ground contact times increases, which can affect an athlete's ability to maintain speed and overall sprint performance (Moura et al., 2024). In conclusion, it was obvious that both the total force production capability and technical ability to apply ground forces were greatly affected.

=== Injury Prevention ===
Running gait (biomechanics) is very important for not only efficiency but also for injury prevention. Approximately between 25 and 65% of all runners experience running related injuries each year. Abnormal running mechanics are often cited as the cause of injuries. However, few suggest altering a person's running pattern in order to reduce the risk of injury. Wearable technology companies like I Measure U are creating solutions using biomechanics data to analyse the gait of a runner in real time and provide feedback on how to change the running technique to reduce injury risk.
