= I Measure U =

New Zealand company that develops inertial measurement units

IMeasureU, Ltd.
- Type: Private
- Industry: Inertial measurement unit, Wearable technology
- Founded: May 2013, Auckland
- Founder: Mark Finch
- Headquarters: Auckland, New Zealand
- Area served: Auckland
- Key people: Mark Finch (Founder & CTO); Thor Besier Co-founder
- Number of employees: 15
- Parent: Vicon
- Website: www.imeasureu.com

IMeasureU, Ltd. (IMU) is a company that specializes in wearable technology. They develop inertial measurement units that analyze body movements in sports. The company combines sensor data with computational models to model human body movement. IMeasureU has collaborated with Athletics Australia runners.

In July 2017, the company was acquired by Vicon, an English company specializing in motion capture. The acquisition aimed to integrate Vicon's camera systems with IMeasureU's sensors.

On 23 June 2015, IMeasureU launched an Indiegogo campaign seeking to raise US $200,000 to develop a consumer product.

== See also ==
- Running injuries
- Biomechanics of sprint running
