= Oura Health =

Finnish health technology company

Oura Health Ltd
- Native name: Oura Health Oy
- Type: Private – Oy
- Industry: Health technology, consumer electronics
- Founded: 2013; 13 years ago in Oulu, Finland
- Founders: Petteri Lahtela; Kari Kivelä; Markku Koskela
- Headquarters: San Francisco, California, United States
- Area served: Worldwide
- Key people: David Shuman (Chairman); Tom Hale (CEO)
- Products: Smart rings, software
- Brands: Oura Ring, Oura App, Oura Teams
- Revenue: US$500 million (2024)
- Total equity: US$11 billion (2025)
- Number of employees: 1,200 (2026)
- Website: ouraring.com

Oura Health Ltd (natively Oura Health Oy) is a consumer electronics company founded in 2013. It is headquartered in Oulu, Finland and San Francisco, US.

The company develops Ōura, a line of smart rings capable of monitoring heart rate, respiration, physical activity, and temperature. A total of 5.5 million Oura Rings had been sold as of June 2026.

Oura Health has sponsored various sporting groups, such as Team Finland, Team USA, and US Soccer. As of 2026, the company controls two-thirds of the US market for smart rings, and is ranked as Finland's most valuable startup.

== History ==
=== Founding and early years (2013–2019) ===
Oura Health was founded in Oulu, Finland in 2013 by Petteri Lahtela, Kari Kivelä, and Markku Koskela. Former engineers with Nokia and Polar, the co-founders began building a ring with sensors to monitor biometrics such as heart rate, respiration, body temperature, and movement. In 2015, Oura introduced the first-generation ring via a Kickstarter campaign. Also in 2015, the company raised US$2.3 million in a seed funding round led by Lifeline Ventures. Going into commercial production in 2016, Oura Health won a CES 2016 Innovation Award.

Harpreet Singh Rai became Oura's president in July 2017. The second-generation ring came out in 2018, after initially launching at the 2017 Slush tech conference in Helsinki. In July 2018, Oura Health had locations in Oulu, Helsinki, and San Francisco. In September 2018, Michael Dell invested in the company, and by the end of the year, Oura had raised a total of $20 million from investors such as MSD Capital, Steve Chen, Kevin Lin, Dave Morin, Lance Armstrong, Shaquille O'Neal, Will Smith, and David Chang. The funding helped the company scale production and increase shipping times.

=== Covid partnerships and expansion (2020–2021) ===
A study by the Rockefeller Neuroscience Institute, published in May 2020, found the Oura ring to be 90% accurate at predicting coronavirus three days in advance of symptoms. As a result of the research, sporting groups such as the NBA and NASCAR began using Oura rings to monitor the health of their players, and by late 2020, Oura Health had partnered with sports groups such as Aston Martin Red Bull Racing, the Seattle Mariners, UFC, and the WNBA to monitor player health. The Oura Ring was listed as one of Time magazine's "100 Best Inventions of 2020", with TIME mentioning especially its COVID-19-related partnership with the NBA. Also in 2020, Oura Health was named 'Best Consumer Wellness Company' at the UCSF Digital Health Awards. Between March and December 2020, the company doubled in size, with its headcount jumping to 200 employees. By December 2020, it had raised a total of $48 million from investors, including Jack Dorsey, Biz Stone, Marc Benioff, Michael Dell, and Mark Pincus. The Oura Ring had also been adopted by a number of celebrities such as Jennifer Aniston, Prince Harry, and Kim Kardashian, referring to her high sleep scores.

In May 2021, Oura announced Series C funding of US$100 million from investors such as The Chernin Group, Temasek, and Eisai. The third-generation ring came out in October 2021. While publications such as Wired gave the device positive reviews, Oura's new $6-per-month subscription service, which placed certain services behind a paywall, was criticized as relatively expensive. At the end of 2021, Harpreet Singh Rai stepped down as Oura's CEO, and was replaced on an interim basis by Oura's COO Michael Chapp.

=== Acquisitions (2022–2024) ===
Tom Hale was appointed CEO in April 2022. According to Politico, Hale "steered Oura away from its focus on sleep to becoming a holistic health adviser, investing particularly in women’s health." In 2022, Oura launched Oura for Business, an employer-focused wellness arm. In May 2023, Oura Health Oy acquired tech startup, Proxy Inc., which makes digital identification tools. In November 2023, Oura and the gym brand Equinox launched Rest & Recovery Kit, with the third-generation Oura Ring included.

In 2024, Oura acquired the personalized metabolic health firm Veri, as well as the enterprise health analytics company Sparta Science. In November 2024, Oura announced a partnership with the glucose monitoring company Dexcom, with plans to enable Oura users to monitor glucose levels by 2025. In December 2024, Oura Health raised $200 million from investors such as Fidelity Management and Dexcom, bringing its valuation to $5.2 billion. Oura reported 2024 revenues of $500 million. By the end of that year, 2.5 million Oura Rings had been sold, and the company had 1 million members.

=== Recent models and fundraising (2025–2026) ===
5.5 million Oura Rings had been sold by September 2025. In October 2025, Oura raised US$900 million in a Series E funding round, the most ever raised for a Finnish company. The investment round brought its valuation to $11 billion. Also in 2025, Oura won patent infringement lawsuits against competitors Ultrahuman and RingConn. Oura had argued to the United States International Trade Commission that the companies had "copied two signature features [of Oura Rings], including the curved battery and advanced sensors." Oura subsequently sued Samsung and Reebok for patent infringement as well. By February 2026, Oura controlled two-thirds of the US market for smart rings. It also ranked as Finland's most valuable startup, and was again named on the CNBC Disruptor 50 list.

In 2026 the company underwent a redomicalization to the United States, as Oura Inc., now a holding company of Finnish Oura Health Oy, however committed to retain significant engineering and product development presence in their old home of Oulu. Oura had raised a total of $1.5 billion from investors by May 2026. It had 1,200 employees, and offices in London, Helsinki, Los Angeles, San Diego, San Francisco, and Oulu. Most of its research and development were conducted at its twin headquarters in Oulu and San Francisco. In May 2026, Oura filed confidentially with the U.S. Securities and Exchange Commission for an initial public offering, stating the IPO would proceed following the SEC's review process. Oura Ring 5 was released in June 2026. In September, the company publicly filed its registration statement and announced plans to list on the Nasdaq. The offering was postponed on September 29, with Oura Health citing uncertainty in the IPO market. By September 2026, Oura had 5.7 million paid members.

== Official partnerships ==
According to Oura Health, as of 2026, it has 1,200 official partnerships with organizations in health, sports, and government. The Oura Ring is the "official wearable" of US Soccer, Team USA, the LA28 Olympic & Paralympic Games, Team Finland, the US Open, the United States Tennis Association (USTA), and USTA Coaching. Oura Health is also an official partner of the US Soccer Federation, and a founding partner of the Arthur M. Blank U.S. Soccer National Training Center. In May 2026, Oura announced a joint research program with the Department of Health - Abu Dhabi to study preventive health.

Oura also works with the US Department of Defense (DoD), after first partnering with the DoD in 2019 to track military readiness. Oura Health subsequently worked with the DoD during the COVID-19 pandemic, and collaborated with the US Air Force and US Navy on fatigue and health monitoring. In 2024, Oura also had commercial business with the Naval Health Research Center and the Defense Innovation Unit, and that October, Oura signed a $96 million deal to supply smart rings to US military personnel. The agreement included Oura's data analytics services for use by the Pentagon's health department. As part of its partnership with the Pentagon, in August 2025, Oura announced its first US manufacturing project, to be located Fort Worth, Texas.

== Oura Ring ==
Oura Ring
- A display of Oura rings at an electronics retail store in Nagoya, Japan, 2025
- Developer: Oura Health
- Manufacturer: Oura Health
- Type: Smart ring
- Released: 2015; 11 years ago
- Lifespan: 2015–present
- Connectivity: Bluetooth
- Power: Built-in rechargeable battery
- Online services: Oura App
- Backward compatibility: iPhone, Android
- Website: ouraring.com

Oura Health's main product is the Oura Ring, which collects health data from the wearer's finger. As of June 2026, there have been five different generations of the device.

=== Features and app ===
Designed to be comfortable and not disrupt sleep or exercise, the Oura Ring shines light beams, including red, infrared, and green LED, though skin to gain readings. To collect data, as the light is reflected through the skin, changes in the reflection are analyzed by an algorithm developed by the company. The collected data is then transmitted via Bluetooth to the company's smartphone app. The Oura App allows users to track up to 50 biomarkers, including activity, body temperature, respiratory rate, sleep patterns, menstrual cycles, and heart rate and heart rate variability (as measured by RMSSD), among others. The app then synthesizes the data into three scores, between 0 and 100: Sleep, Activity, and Readiness. Although the app is free, access to certain data sets and features requires a monthly subscription. According to Oura in May 2026, its rings were worn an average for 23.5 hours a day, with 80% of members renewing their subscriptions after the first year.

A number of new app features were rolled out in 2024, 2025, and 2026. Introduced in 2024, the AI chatbot Oura Advisor gives health and activity suggestions, and can discuss trends in user data. Oura introduced Symptom Radar, a subscription-based feature to identify early signs of illness, in late 2024. Launched in 2025, the Health Panels blood testing feature lets users schedule and view health results from within the Oura App. In May 2026, Oura Health partnered with Counsel Health to provide users with online access to physicians. Oura also introduced a Health Radar menu to analyze blood pressure and breathing disturbances during sleep, and added a feature allowing health records to be uploaded into the app.

Oura Teams is the company's enterprise data management platform.

Women's Health

Current Oura Rings include three features that prioritize Women’s Health. These features are Cycle Insights, Pregnancy Insights, and Menopause Insights. These features can help track menstrual cycles, monitor vitals during pregnancy, and explain and track menopause symptoms to users.

The Pregnancy Insights feature can monitor the changes that occur during gestation. These changes are monitored by the tracking the mother's activity, temperature, sleep, and cardiorespiratory vitals.

=== Models ===
Oura Ring 1 and 2

Bulkier than the newer versions, the first-generation ring was introduced in 2016. The second generation ring came out in 2018, and was afterwards listed as one of the Time's "100 Best Inventions of 2020". A reviewer for Wired criticized the second generation's $299 price, but did praise its accuracy and note the device was "specifically useful for women." Other reviews of the Oura Ring 2's accuracy were less positive. One early test found that on average, the ring's sleep tracking feature was only 58.9% accurate. The third-generation ring showed significantly better accuracy in sleep tracking.

Oura Ring 3

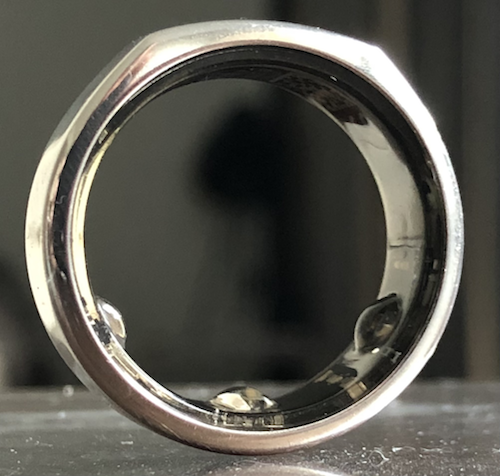
A third-generation Oura Ring, with pulse detection sensors visible at the bottom

Oura Health announced the third-generation Oura Ring on October 26, 2021, with new features including 24/7 heart rate monitoring, blood oxygen monitoring, and period prediction. In May 2022, Oura and fashion brand Gucci launched a version of the Oura Ring 3 with details in 18-karat yellow gold.

Oura Ring 4

Oura Ring 4 was launched in October 2024. with Oura Ring 4 Ceramic launched in October 2025. Unlike prior models with sensors clustered inside three bumps, the fourth generation has sensors that are recessed and asymmetrically positioned. Its battery lasts for eight days on a single charge and the device weighs 4 to 6 grams (0.14 to 0.21 oz), depending on ring size. With the Oura Ring 4, Oura Health introduced its "smart sensing" technology, which captures data on movement, skin temperature, heart and respiratory rates, and blood oxygen levels.

The fourth-generation ring was well-received. Included on TIME's "Best Inventions of 2025" list, it was also named the "Health and Fitness Device of the Year" at the 2025 TechRadar Choice Awards and "Best New Smart Ring" at the 2025-2026 Tech Advisor Awards. A reviewer for Wired wrote that the software and hardware updates made it "more accurate, useful, and easier to wear" than the Oura Ring 3.

Oura Ring 5

The Oura Ring 5 became available for purchase in June 2026. With a width of 0.6 millimeters and a thickness of 2.28 mm, the ring is 40% smaller than Oura Ring 4. Waterproof up to 100 meters with 6 to 9 days of battery life, it has 12 LED sensors, 6 fewer than its predecessor. The Oura Ring 5 debuted with new features such as GLP-1 medication tracking, a new optional charging case, and multi-ring support, allowing users to switch between multiple Oura Ring 4 and Oura Ring 5 devices.

The ring was well-received, earning a score of 9/10 from Wired, and 4 of 5 stars from PC Mag, which also gave it the Editors' Choice award for finger-based trackers. The Guardian also gave the device 4 of 5 stars, praising the small size and new app features, but criticizing the cost and lack of repairability.

=== Battery safety concerns ===
In December 2025, Oura faced public scrutiny after several Reddit users posted images of Oura Rings that appeared scorched or partially melted, with users stating the rings overheated either during charging or while being worn. Oura responded that the incidents were "extremely rare," and that internal reviews found no evidence of a broader safety issue.

=== Debate on psychological impact ===
A 2025 article in Vox by Adam Clark Estes described a six-month experiment using multiple health-tracking devices, including the Apple Watch, Oura Ring, and Whoop band. The article suggested that while such devices can give useful insights, excessive monitoring may be overwhelming to users, and exacerbate anxiety and compulsive behavior. A reviewer for Harper's Bazaar, who used the Oura Ring for a year, also described developing a fixation on the health scores, which by itself caused anxiety. In response to anxiety caused by the scoring system, in 2025, Oura introduced a "rest mode" and more "compassionate" messaging.

=== Palantir privacy controversy ===
On August 27, 2025, Oura announced a new manufacturing facility in Fort Worth, Texas, to be used to support its contract supplying the United States Department of Defense (DoD). The announcement mentioned a partnership with the FedStart program owned by the security and defense data analytics company Palantir. The Palantir connection sparked concern with some users over the protection and handling of sensitive biometric data, resulting in a trend of customers announcing on Reddit and TikTok that they would no longer wear their rings.

In response to the trend, Oura clarified that only data from DoD customers would be shared on the Palantir system, stating Palantir "provides the security layer for some of the DoD's projects with Oura... this security layer is entirely separate from Oura's consumer platform and does not interact with customer data." Oura also noted that concerning medical data, it is legally bound by the European General Data Protection Regulation and Health Insurance Portability and Accountability Act (HIPAA). In response to privacy concerns, in 2025 the company added a feature allowing Oura Ring users to selectively delete their data.

== See also ==
- List of companies of Finland
- List of unicorn startup companies
