= McLear =

McLear is a surname. Notable people with the surname include:

- George McLear (1891–1950), Australian rules footballer
- Jim McLear (1896–1968), Australian rules footballer
- Lewis McLear (born 1996), Scottish footballer
- Theodore McLear (1879–1958), American sport wrestler

== See also ==
- McLeary
