= McLeary =

McLeary is a surname. Notable people with the surname include:

- Alan McLeary (born 1964), English footballer and manager
- Don McLeary (born 1948), American football coach and politician
- Jamie McLeary (born 1981), Scottish golfer
- Kindred McLeary (1901–1949), American artist, architect and educator
- Marty McLeary (born 1974), American baseball player
- Max McLeary (1948–2014), American baseball umpire
- Samuel H. McLeary (1881–1924), American aviator

== See also ==
- McCleary (surname)
