= Ultrahuman =

Health-tech company in India

Ultrahuman Healthcare
- Founder: Mohit Kumar; Vatsal Singhal
- Headquarters: Bengaluru, India
- Products: Ultrahuman Ring; Ultrahuman M1
- Number of employees: 51-200

Ultrahuman is a health technology company headquartered in Bengaluru, India, that designs, manufactures and sells the Ultrahuman Ring Air smart ring, the Ultrahuman M1 continuous glucose monitor, the Ultrahuman Home indoor monitoring device, and related blood testing services. Ultrahuman was incorporated in 2019 by Mohit Kumar and Vatsal Singhal. Kumar and Singhal had previously co-founded Runnr in 2015, a food delivery startup that was later acquired by Zomato.

== History ==
Ultrahuman was founded by Mohit Kumar and Vatsal Singhal in 2019.

In January 2021, Ultrahuman launched its app at the CES in Los Angeles. In June 2021, it launched a continuous glucose monitor called Ultrahuman M1 (formerly known as Ultrahuman Cyborg).

In April 2022, Ultrahuman acquired LazyCo, a wearables IoT company that had developed an AI-powered smart ring.

In June 2023, Ultrahuman won the Red Dot Design Award at Berlin for its Ultrahuman Ring Air.

=== 2024–2025 developments ===
In December 2024, the company introduced the Cycle & Ovulation PowerPlug, an optional module for Ring Air that uses biomarker data to estimate fertile windows.

In August 2025, Ultrahuman acquired medical device company viO HealthTech, developer of the OvuCore vaginal temperature sensor and OvuSense fertility algorithm. The acquisition led to the launch of Cycle & Ovulation Pro, a paid version of the cycle tracking module. TechCrunch reported that the acquisition allowed the company to offer more advanced cycle predictions by porting the OvuSense algorithm to the Ultrahuman Ring Air.

In July 2025, Ultrahuman launched Blood Vision, a service that offers blood testing for more than 100 biomarkers and integrates results with data from its wearables. Forbes and HLTH reported that the service initially rolled out across 48 US states.

In June 2025, the company introduced Ultrahuman Home, a device that monitors indoor air quality, temperature, humidity, noise and light.

=== 2026 ===
In February 2026, Ultrahuman announced the Ring PRO, a third-generation smart ring with a titanium unibody construction, a dual-core processor and a stated battery life of up to 15 days. The Ring PRO began shipping on 20 June 2026, priced at $479 including a charging case.

US pre-orders for the Ring PRO opened on 24 March 2026, following clearance from US Customs and Border Protection. Ultrahuman had suspended US sales after the US International Trade Commission found that its earlier Ring Air had infringed patents held by rival Oura.

On 3 September 2026, Ultrahuman announced a $70 million funding round comprising $65 million in equity and $5 million in debt, led by Qualcomm Ventures with participation from Labcorp, Alpha Wave, Blume Ventures, Nexus Venture Partners and Alteria Capital. TechCrunch reported that the round valued the company at $365 million, citing a person familiar with the matter. Ultrahuman said the funding would support research and development in sensing, on-device AI and health algorithms, and that it was working with Qualcomm on a future ring using Qualcomm silicon.

== Products ==
- Ring PRO – a third-generation smart ring with a titanium unibody construction, dual-core processor with on-device machine learning, and up to 15 days of battery life (extendable to around 45 days with the accompanying PRO Charging Case). It stores up to 250 days of health data on-device and includes ProRelease Technology, allowing the ring to be cut off in the event of finger injury or swelling. The Ring PRO launched globally in February 2026, with US pre-orders opening on 24 March 2026 following clearance from US Customs and Border Protection.
- Ring Air – a smart ring that records sleep, movement, skin temperature and heart‑rate variability. Additional functions, including an AFib detection module that monitors heart rhythm using FibriCheck, can be enabled via optional PowerPlugs apps.
- M1 – a continuous‑glucose monitoring sensor and app that provides metabolic scores and nutrition guidance.
- Ultrahuman Home – an indoor monitoring hub that records environmental factors such as air quality, temperature, humidity, noise and light.
- Blood Vision – a preventive blood‑testing service in the US, India, UAE and Saudi Arabia.
- PowerPlugs – a marketplace of mini‑applications for Ring Air; some applications are free, while others, including AFib detection and Cycle & Ovulation Pro, require a subscription.

== Research ==
In March 2024, Ultrahuman published a multi-armed observational study that included 105 non-diabetic and pre-diabetic individuals. The study aimed to examine metabolic health as a continuous spectrum, and reported a correlation between the company's "Metabolic score" and inflammatory markers. The research also included blood markers and gut-microbiome index markers, and was published in Scientific Reports.

== Funding ==
Ultrahuman has raised $65 million across three rounds of investments.

Ultrahuman raised $7.5 million in a seed round from Nexus Venture Partners and Blume Ventures.

In their Series A round, Ultrahuman raised $17.5 million in funding from Alpha Wave Incubation (AWI), Steadview Capital, Nexus Venture Partners, Blume Ventures and iSeed fund.

In March 2024, Ultrahuman closed a US$35 million Series B funding round, comprising US$25 million in equity and the remainder in debt. The round was co‑led by existing investors Blume Ventures, Steadview Capital and Nexus Venture Partners, with participation from Alpha Wave Global and Zomato founder Deepinder Goyal. Ultrahuman said it would use the proceeds to increase manufacturing capacity and fund health‑tracking research.

== UltraFactory ==
Ultrahuman opened its first UltraFactory in Bengaluru in 2022. It partnered with the U.S. electronics manufacturer SVTronics and opened a factory in Plano, Texas. HBW Insight reported that the company maintains offices in London, India and the United Arab Emirates and sells its products through more than 150 retail outlets worldwide.
