= Wearable technology =

Clothing and accessories incorporating computer and advanced electronic technologies

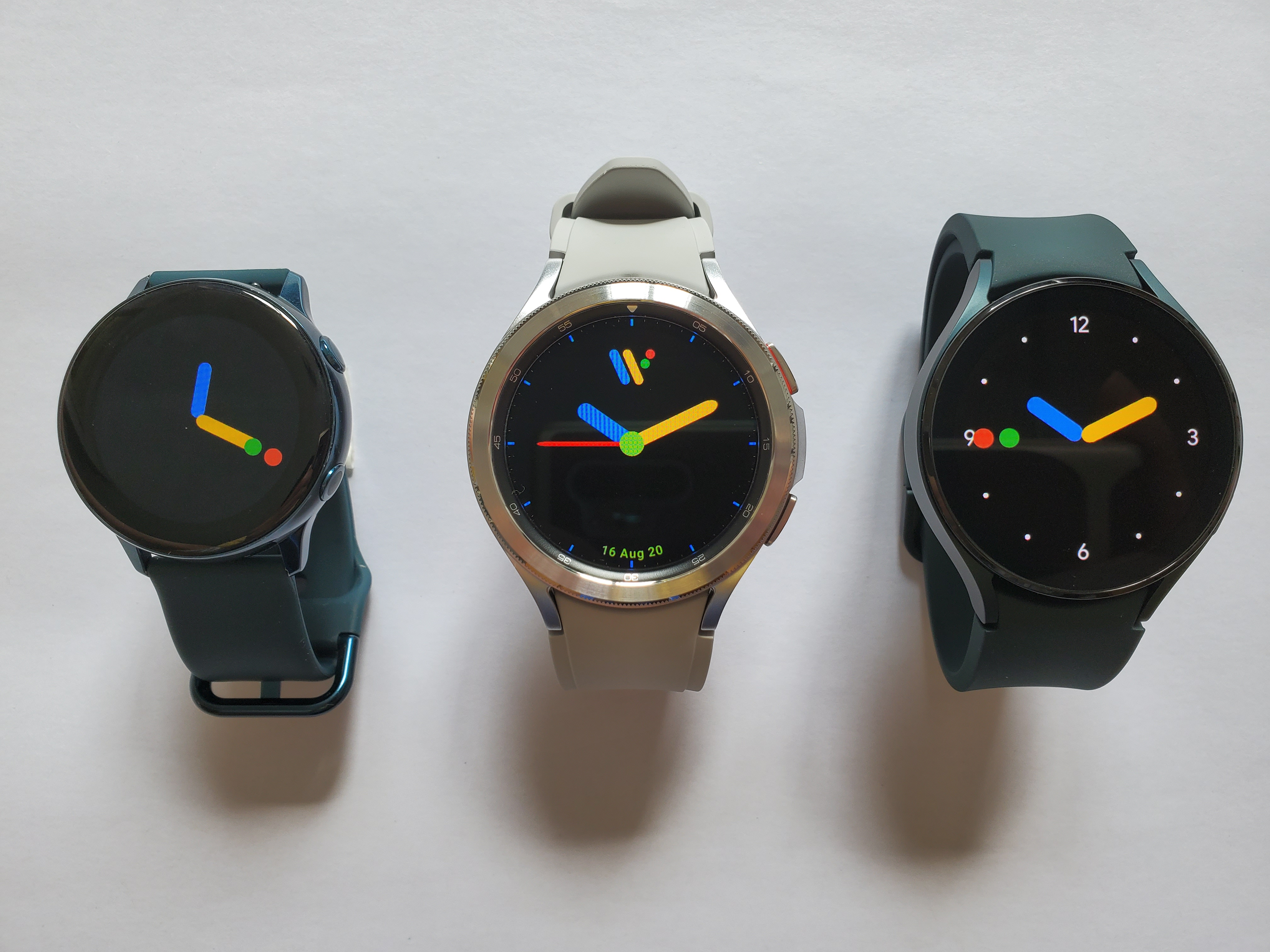
Samsung Galaxy Watch is designed specifically for sports and health functions, including a step counter and a heart rate monitor.

Wearable technology is devices that are worn on, near, or inside the human body. It can be incorporated into accessories or clothing. They typically include sensors, a processor, a power source, and wireless connectivity. This allows them to collect/provide data (movement, biometrics, environment), process it, and communicate without specific user attention. Sensor technology includes smartwatches, fitness trackers, earbuds, and smartglasses. It also includes medical technology such as pacemakers, continuous glucose monitors, neuroprosthetics, exoskeletons. and dual-use technology such as night-vision devices.

Sensing devices can detect, analyze, and transmit information such as personal vital signs, and/or ambient data and may provide immediate biofeedback. Virtual reality and augmented reality devices complement/supplant human senses. Viewing devices display remote content. Mechanical aids enhance physical ability.

Wearable technology can encourage individuals to improve their lifestyle choices by providing feedback. Healthy behavior is encouraged by tracking activity levels and providing useful feedback to enable goal setting. This can be shared with interested stakeholders such as healthcare providers. Wearables are popular in consumer electronics, most commonly in the form factors of smartwatches, smart rings, and implants. Apart from commercial uses, wearable technology is being incorporated into navigation systems, advanced textiles (e-textiles), and healthcare. As wearable technology is being proposed for use in critical applications, like other technology, it is vetted for its reliability and security properties.

Devices that gather data must protect user privacy. Some data may be useful to health care providers, but care must be taken to ensure that it is not misused.

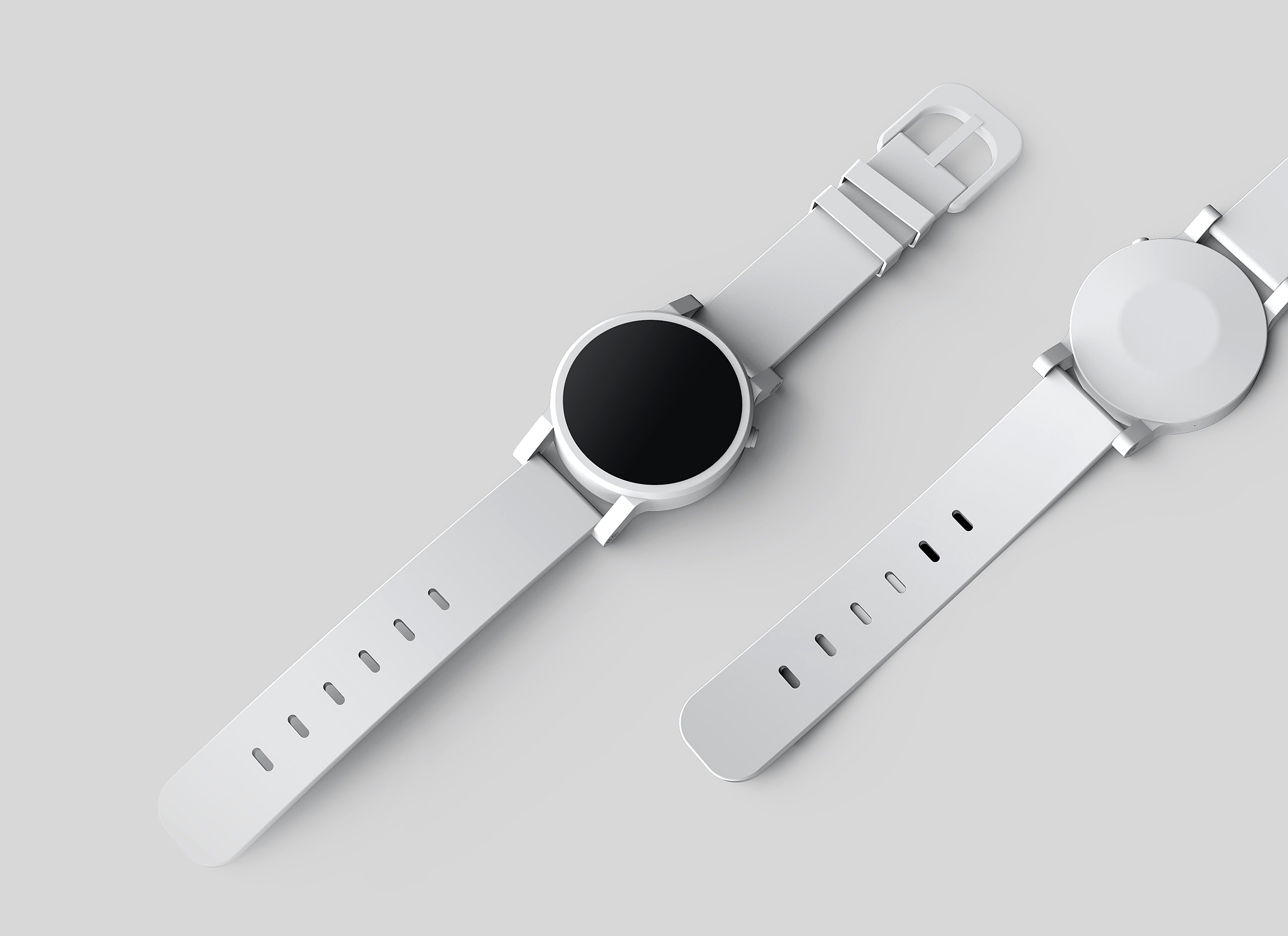
A smartwatch

== History ==
In the 1500s, German inventor Peter Henlein (1485–1542) created small watches worn as necklaces. A century later, pocket watches grew in popularity as waistcoats became fashionable for men. Wristwatches were created in the late 1600s, worn mostly by women as bracelets.

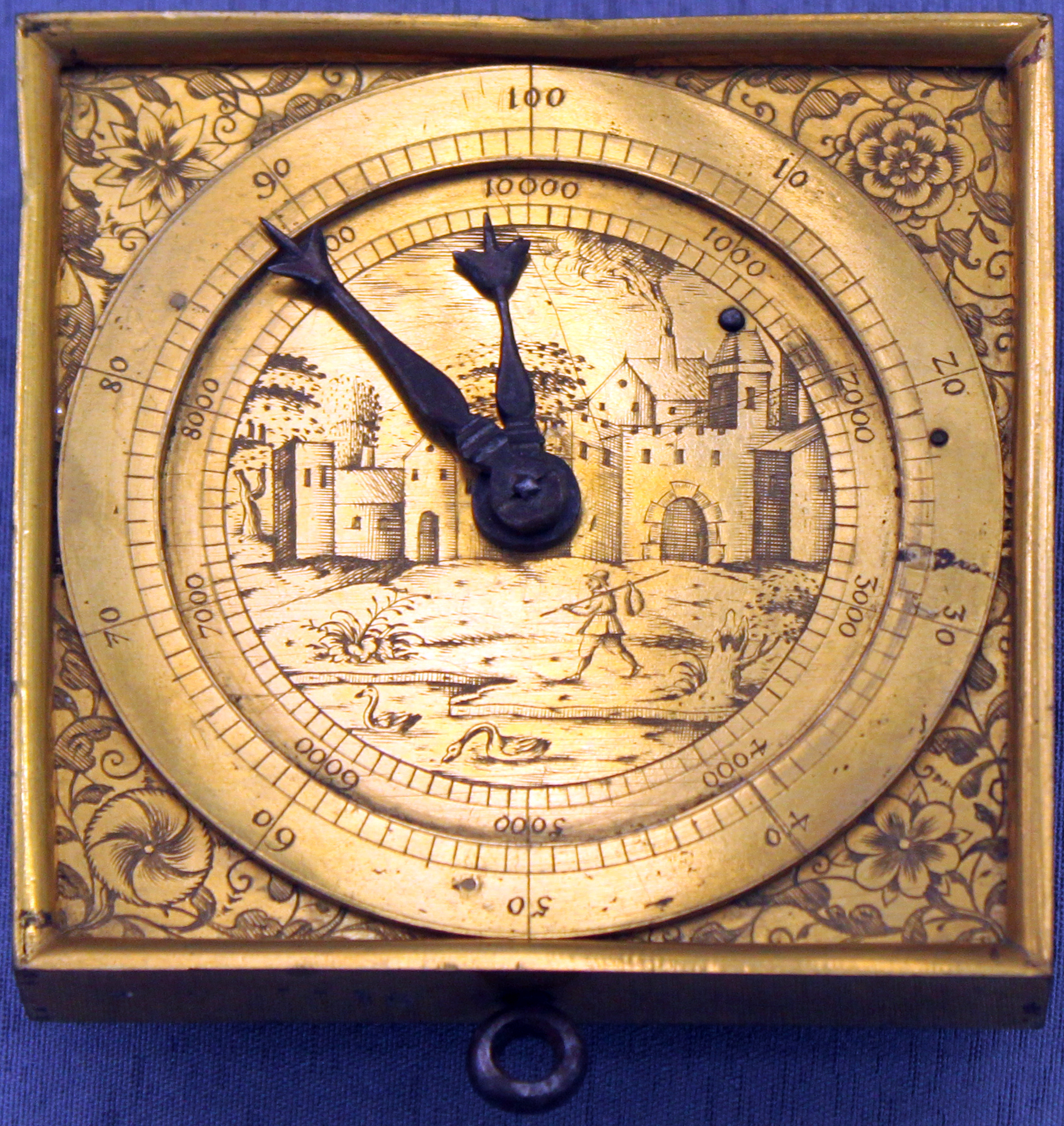
Historical pedometer, Southern Germany, 1590

Pedometers were developed around the same time as pocket watches. The concept was described by Leonardo da Vinci around 1500, while the Germanic National Museum in Nuremberg has a pedometer in its collection from 1590.

In the late 1800s, the first wearable hearing aids were introduced.

In 1904, aviator Alberto Santos-Dumont pioneered the modern wristwatch.

In 1949, American biophysicist Norman Holter invented the first health monitoring device. His invention, the Holter monitor, was one of the first wearable devices capable of tracking health data outside of a clinical setting.

VR headsets were first conceptualized in the 1950s and created in the 1960s. Cinematographer Morton Heilig created the Sensorama in 1962. It was a videogame -like device that was held up by a suspension device.

In 1967, French fashion designer Pierre Cardin created a collection entitled "robe electronique" that featured a geometric embroidered pattern with LEDs (light emitting diodes).

In 1968, the Museum of Contemporary Craft held a Body Covering exhibition that presented the infusion of technological wearables with fashion. The projects included clothing that changed temperature, dresses that lit up and produced noises.

On April 16, 2013, Google launch Google Glass, an eyeglass-like device that delivered text and notifications. The device had a 5 MP camera and recorded video at 720p. Its functions were activated via voice command, such as "OK Glass". The company also launched a companion app, MyGlass. The first third-party Google Glass App came from the New York Times, which was able to vocalize articles and news summaries. In early 2015, Google stopped selling the beta "explorer edition" of Glass, after criticism of its design and the $1,500 price tag.

In the 1970s, calculator watches became available.

From the early 2000s, wearable cameras were used as part of a growing sousveillance movement. Expectations, operations, usage and concerns about wearable technology emerged at the first International Conference on Wearable Computing. In 2008, Ilya Fridman incorporated a Bluetooth microphone into a pair of earrings.

Tech companies such as Apple, Samsung, and Fitbit created devices that send data to smartphones and personal computers to monitor activity and health.

In 2010, Fitbit released its first step counter.

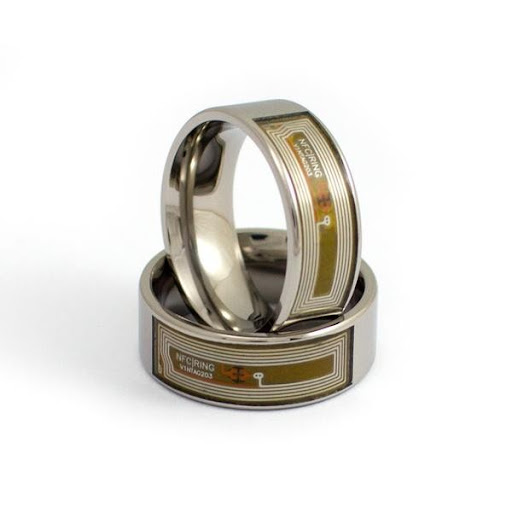
A "smart ring" released by McLear/NFC Ring, c. 2013

Pebble reinvented the smartwatch in 2013, with a Kickstarter campaign that raised more than $10m.

McLear invented the smart ring in 2013, with its own Kickstarter campaign that raised $300k+. For wearables it introduced payments (including bitcoin), advanced secure access control, quantified self data collection, biometric data tracking, and health monitoring systems.

One of the first smartwatches was the Samsung Galaxy Gear. Apple followed in 2015 with the Apple Watch.

In 2014, Avegant introduceed Smart Headphones that use Virtual Retinal Display to enhance the Oculus Rift.

In March 2014, Motorola unveiled the Moto 360 smartwatch powered by Android Wear, a modified version of Android designed for smartwatches and other wearables. Apple announced the Apple Watch in September 2014.

At the Consumer Electronics Show in 2014, numerous wearable products were showcased, such as smartwatches, activity trackers, smart jewelry, head-mounted optical displays and earbuds.

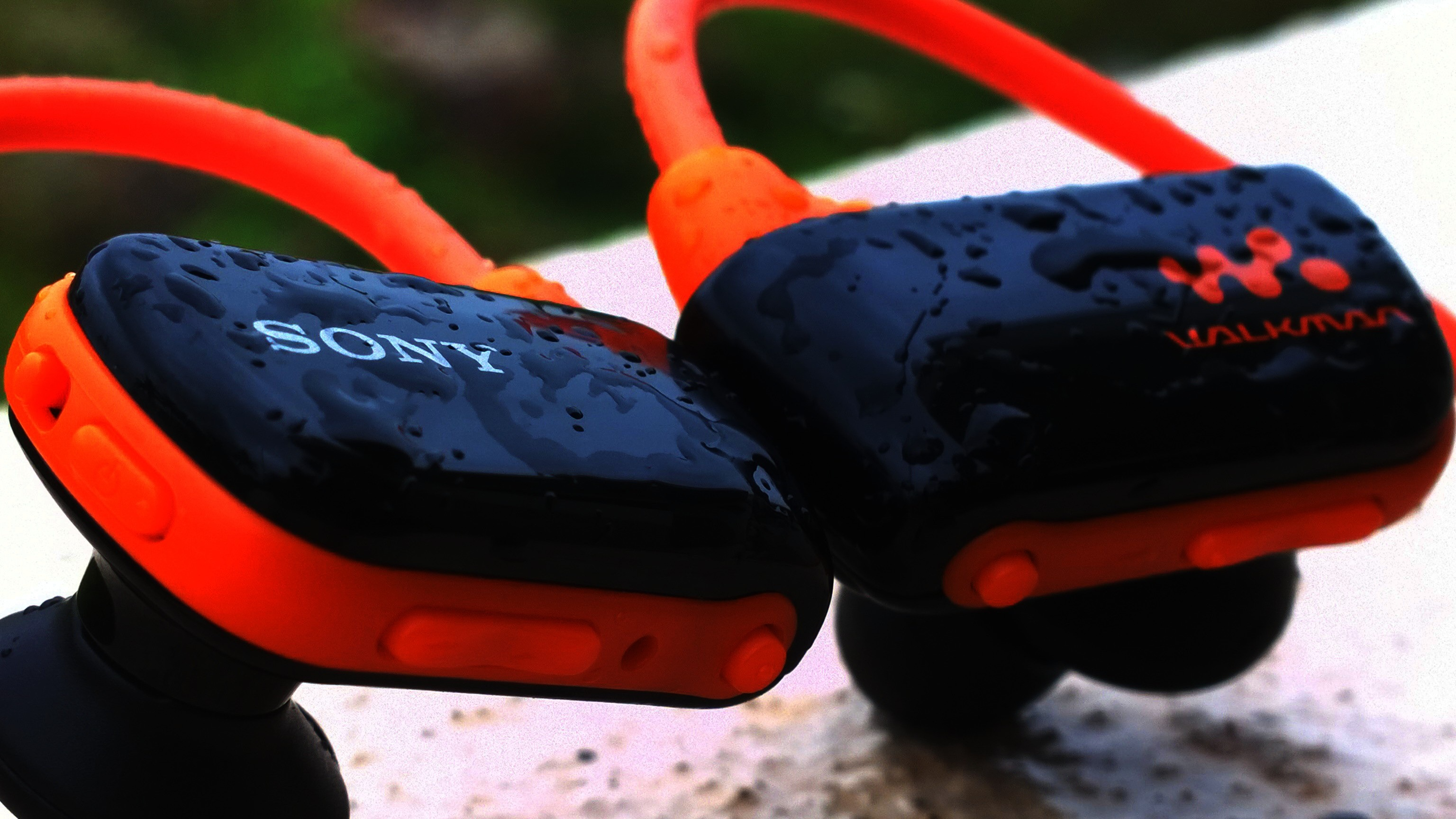
A wearable Walkman music player

In 2016 Google released their VR headsets, the Google Daydream. In 2016, Sony debuted its VR headset Project Morpheus.

ShiftWear makes a shoe that uses a smartphone application to periodically change the design display on the shoe. The shoe features a display along the midsection and back that shows a design. A prototype for the shoes was created in 2017.

In 2017 Snap introduced its AR glasses product Spectacles and Microsoft released HoloLens.

Jabra released noise canceling earbuds in 2018.

== Usage ==
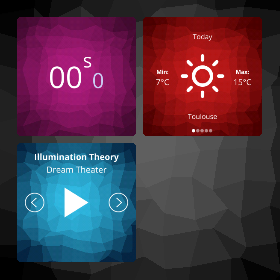
Multiple open apps in the open source AsteroidOS (2016)

In the consumer space, sales of smart wristbands (aka activity trackers such as the Jawbone UP and Fitbit Flex) started accelerating in 2013. One in five American adults had a wearable device, according to the 2014 PriceWaterhouseCoopers Wearable Future Report.

In sports, wearable technology has applications in monitoring and real-time feedback. Examples include accelerometers, pedometers, and GPS's that can measure an athlete's energy expenditure and movement pattern.

In cybersecurity and financial technology, secure wearable devices have captured part of the physical security key market. McLear and VivoKey developed products with one-time pass secure access control.

In health informatics, wearable devices have enabled better capturing of human health statistics for data driven analysis. This has facilitated data-driven machine learning algorithms.

In business, wearable technology helps managers monitor employee locations and activities. Employees working in a warehouse have increased safety around chemicals or heavy equipment. Smart helmets are employee safety wearables that use vibration sensors to alert employees of possible danger.

In child care, wearable breast pumps allow hands-free breastfeeding.

In accessibility fields, wearable technology is utilized to assist disabled individuals in a multitude of ways that close the gap in one's access to information and ensure inclusion in public spaces.

== Applications ==
=== Health ===
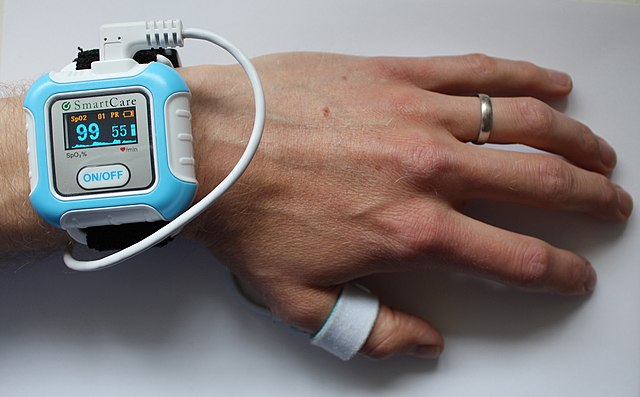
Wearable technology in action

Many wearable products monitor health. This started as early as 1980 when wireless ECG was invented. Later research produced textile-based, tattoo, patch, and contact lens devices as well as the notion of the "quantified self" and transhumanism.

Health wearables can monitor:

- Heart rate (ECG and HRV)
- Muscle oxygen saturation (SmO2, EMG)
- Sleep patterns
- Stress levels
- Fertile periods
- Energy score
- Blood oxygen
- Body composition
- Calories burned
- Steps walked
- Blood pressure
- Release of certain biochemicals
- Time spent exercising
- Seizures
- Physical strain
- Body composition and water levels
- Brainwave (EEG)

Typically, multiple monitoring functions are handled by a single device, such as an activity tracker or a smartwatch. Some devices can identify serious medical conditions such as seizures, sleep and movement disorders.

==== Medical uses ====
Wearable monitoring systems for assisted living and eldercare can improve safety and accelerate diagnosis. Algorithms can glean valuable information from the collected data.

Other possible applications include:

- Monitoring of glucose, alcohol, and lactate or blood oxygen, breath monitoring, heartbeat, heart rate and its variability, electromyography (EMG), electrocardiogram (ECG) and electroencephalogram (EEG), body temperature, pressure (e.g. in shoes), sweat rate or sweat loss, levels of uric acid and ions – e.g., for preventing fatigue or injuries or for optimizing training patterns, including via ingested electronics
- Forecasting changes in mood, stress, and health
- Measuring blood alcohol content
- Measuring athletic performance
- Monitoring illness severity
- Detecting early signs of infection
- Long-term monitoring of heart and circulatory problems
- Health risk assessment applications, including measures of frailty and risks of age-dependent diseases
- Automatic documentation of care activities
- Days-long continuous imaging of diverse organs via a bioadhesive stretchable high-resolution ultrasound imaging patch or e.g., a wearable continuous heart ultrasound imager. (potential novel diagnostic and monitoring tools)
- Sleep tracking
- Cortisol monitoring for measuring stress
- Measuring relaxation or alertness, e.g., to adjust their modulation or to measure efficacy of modulation techniques
- Continuous monitoring of protein biomarkers for diagnosis and monitoring of chronic diseases

==== Proposed applications ====
Proposed applications, including applications without functional wearable prototypes, include:

- Tracking physiological changes such as stress levels and heartbeat of "experiencers" or "contactees" of the UFO-sighting, anomalous physiological effects and alien abduction/contact/sighting phenomena, including "experiencer group research"
- Pathogen detection and detection of hazardous substances
- Improving sleep via sleeping caps

==== COVID-19 ====
Wearable technologies have been developed in order to help with COVID-19 diagnosis. Oxygen levels, antibody detection, blood pressure, heart rate, and so much more are monitored by sensors within these devices.

==== Symptom detection ====
- Smart lenses
- On-teeth sensors
- Face masks
- Smart textiles
- Electronic epidermal tattoos
- Microneedle patches
- Wristbands
- Smart rings
- Smartwatches

Fitness trackers have been used to help detect symptoms. Monitors detect heart rate, blood pressure, oxygen level, etc.

Estimation and prediction techniques is flawed due to the inability to differentiate other illnesses from COVID-19. Elevation in blood pressure, heart rate, etc., as well as oxygen level fluctuations can be attributed to illnesses ranging from the common cold to respiratory diseases. The inability to differentiate them has caused "unnecessary stress in patients, raising concern on the implementation of wearables for health."

Remote monitoring devices and Internet-of-Things (IoT) systems can help manage chronic illnesses through remote patient care and shared decision-making. However, policy and implementation efforts remain vital to fully harness digital health potentials while ensuring equitable access.

=== Military ===
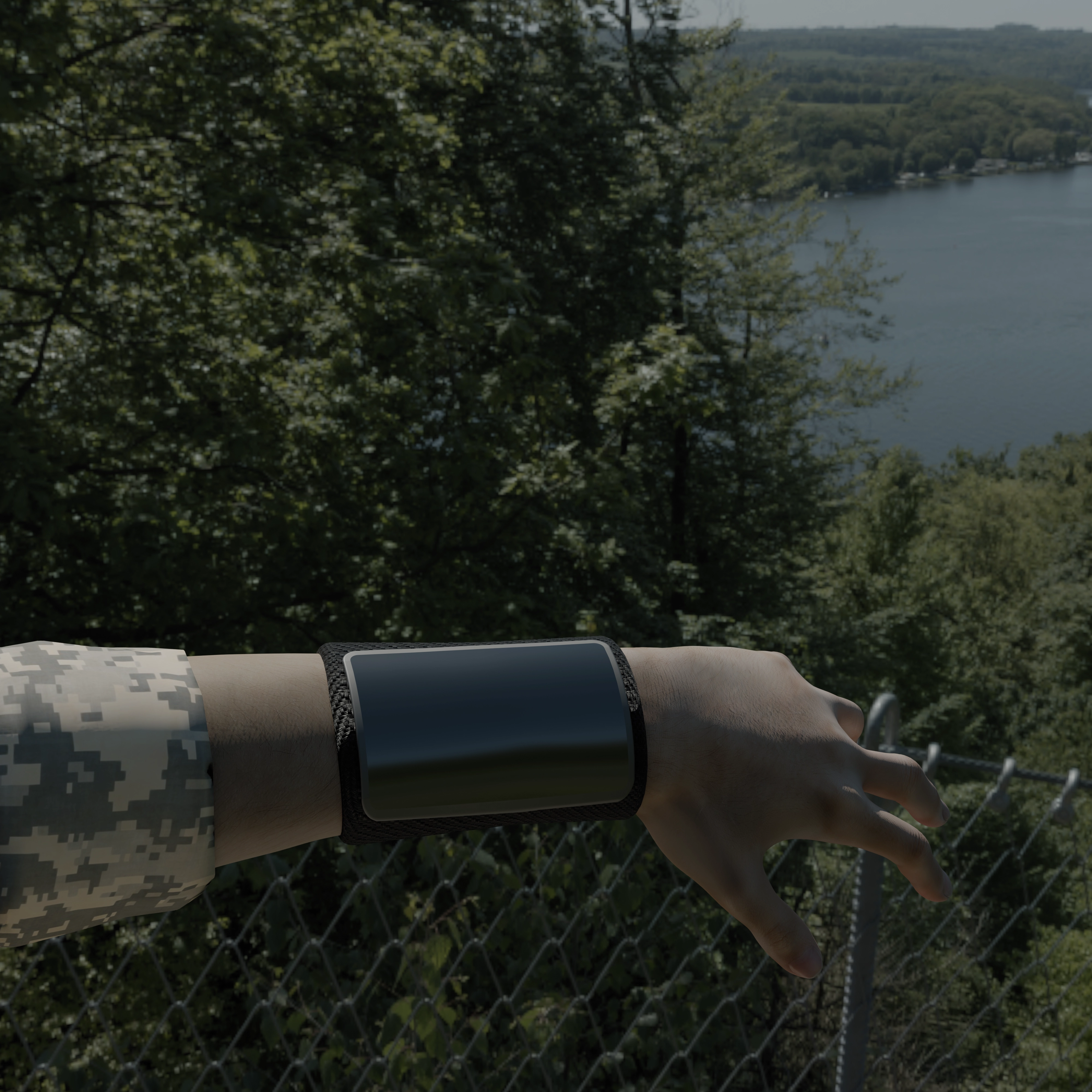
3D design of a wristband computer

Wearable military technology aids education, training, and sustainability.

Military education primarily tracks soldiers' vitals, including heart rate, blood pressure, emotional status, etc. Tracking vitals can indicate emerging environmental threats to the soldiers.

VR headsets have been used to train personnel via simulation. Simulations include a soldier wearing a shock belt during a combat exercise. Each time they are "shot" the belt releases a jolt of electricity.

Personnel wear various sustainability technologies in the field. A boot insert gauges how soldiers are carrying their equipment and how terrain factors impact their mission.

=== Assistive technology ===
Society creates many obstacles for people with disabilities, and wearable technology can help them navigate around these obstacles with greater ease. Some disabilities prevent the individual from fully participating in society, so supplemental usage of these technologies can help them better participate in the regular activities of everyday life. People of all ages with mental, physical, or developmental disabilities, or even those who assist the disabled individuals, can utilize assistive technologies, given that these devices are affordable for the buyer. Even if cost is no longer an issue, factors such as required maintenance, needed training, or compatibility with other devices can play into whether someone purchases assistive wearable devices. It is also worth mentioning that not all disabled individuals want to use accommodating technologies, but some of these individuals feel pressured to use them to fit in or conform to societal norms, since not everyone finds their results beneficial.

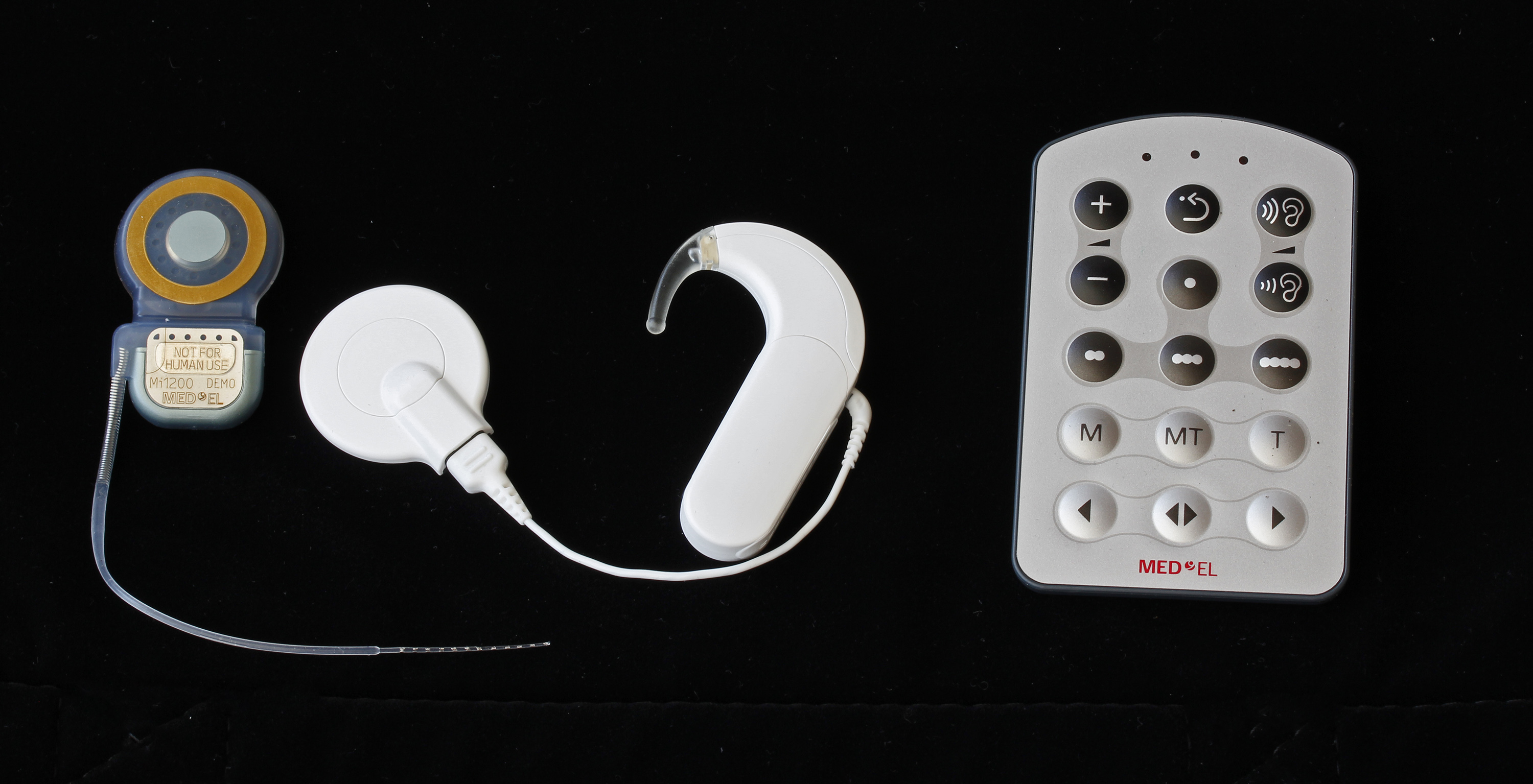
A cochlear implant system manufactured by Med-El

==== Deaf and Hard of Hearing (DHH) technologies ====
Wearable technologies for deaf and hard of hearing individuals are implemented to interpret and locate sounds as well as interpret signs and emotions. For deaf people who choose to use assistive technologies to allow for an increased ability to hear, the most commonly used forms of technology within this category are hearing aids and cochlear implants. However, these devices can have many undesired effects such as infections or the increase of unwanted sounds, which has led to research outside of prostheses that gives assistance, not auditorily, but in making certain tasks easier through other methods. Even with these limitations, these audio-producing technologies have remained widely used due to the benefits of being able to hear spoken language and other sounds in one's environment. But with the new technological solutions, the focus is on complementing the pre-existing culture and signed language of Deaf individuals, not replacing them.

With these newer innovations, IoT based technology has been at the center of it, with sensors playing a big role in interpreting audio cues as well as visual cues to bridge the gap between deaf and hearing individuals. Rather than signaling sounds through auditory feedback, an indication on the screen of smart glasses or from a tactile device can offset some of the downsides of hearing aids and be better integrated into a deaf individual's life. However, these newer methods can also have their flaws, with comfortability and social stigma often being overlooked when implementing these technologies, as well as worries about accuracy, particularly in environments with multiple conversations or points of origin for auditory input.

In recent years, there has been an increased attempt to make technological translators that allow for hearing people to speak and deaf individuals to sign while still being able to communicate, rather than forcing a deaf individual into oral communication. The development of gloves with sensors that can accurately detect signs in a signed language, with American Sign Language (ASL) often being the translated language, has been a giant step in creating a more inclusive methodology to understandability between the deaf and hearing that respects Deaf culture. In Papatsimouli and her partners' working prototype of these gloves for Greek Sign Language (GSL), only the fingerspelled alphabet can currently be translated into text with around 95% accuracy. However, this form of wearable technology, if further developed, could allow for easier communication in workplaces, schools, and other public places between the hearing and deaf, especially in instances where a human sign language interpreter cannot be present. Some possible limitations for such a project are that, as it increases in scale, the chance of inaccuracy increases along with it, causing miscommunications trivial or damaging, and concerns over privacy from sensors that are always active.

In fields such as the food service industry, where it can be difficult for deaf and hearing people to communicate effectively in a fast-paced work environment, there have been advancements in wearable technology to address this issue. Recent research has found that the utilization of a smartwatch network that sends messages between employees through vibrations can allow for coordination among coworkers, hearing and deaf alike, without the need for vocalization or alarms that prevents deaf employees from being fully involved and made aware of important information in the workplace. This low-cost system of devices could allow for inclusion in the workplace based on compromise rather than deaf individuals needing to use hearing aids to fit into a primarily hearing working environment. It is worth noting, this research was done without the involvement of deaf individuals when creating and testing this prototype, so the system of devices cannot be confirmed as being practical or accessible for the Deaf community until further inclusive testing is done.

=== Fashion ===
Fashion wearables primarily address aesthetics, but may also be functional.

==== House of Holland and NFC Ring ====
In 2021 McLear, in partnership with the House of Henry Holland and Visa Europe Collab, presented "Cashless on the Catwalk". Celebrities could make purchases for the first time in history from a wearable device using McLear's smartrings by tapping the ring on a purchase terminal.

In 2008 CuteCircuit pioneered interactive and app-controlled fashion with the Galaxy Dress (part of the permanent collection of the Museum of Science and Industry) and in 2012 with the tshirtOS (later infinitshirt). Their designs can interact and change colour. CuteCircuit's designs were featured by Katy Perry and Nicole Scherzinger. and are part of the permanent collections of the Boston Museum of Fine Arts.

==== Project Jacquard ====
Project Jacquard is a Google fashion project. Google collaborated with Levi Strauss on a jacket with touch-sensitive areas that can control a smartphone. The cuff-links charge in a USB port.

==== Intel and Chromat ====
In 2018 Intel partnered with Chromat to create a sports bra that responds to changes in the body of the user, as well as a 3D printed carbon fiber dress that changes color based on the user's adrenaline levels. Intel partnered with Google and TAG Heuer to make a smart watch.

==== Iris van Herpen ====
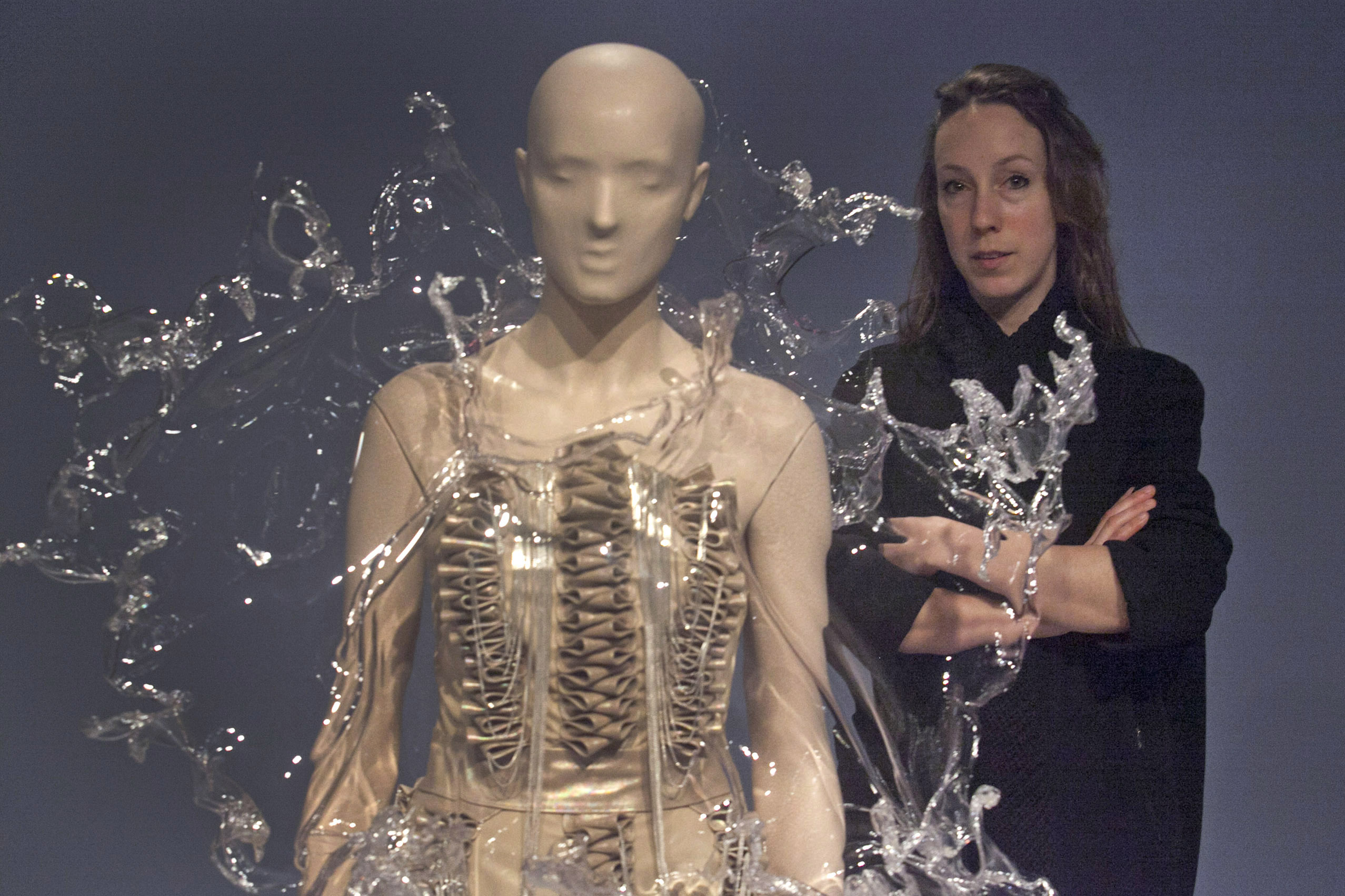
Iris Van Herpen's water dress

In 2016 Iris van Herpen was the first designer to incorporate 3D printing technology into the fashion industry.

== Form factors ==
Popular form factors include smartwatches, smart rings, breast pumps,and implants.

=== Head-worn ===
Glasses (including but not only smartglasses) and VR goggles are head-worn.

==== Headgear ====
Headcaps, for example to measure EEG, are head-worn. A study reported that EEG headgear could be used for neuroenhancement, concluding that a "visual flicker paradigm to entrain individuals at their own brain rhythm (i.e. peak alpha frequency)" allows faster perceptual visual learning, maintained the day following training. Neurostimulation can be achieved using wearable technology.

Another application may be triggering lucid dreams, albeit "better-controlled validation studies are necessary to prove the effectiveness".

=== Smart masks ===
In addition to watches, face masks with sensors can detect characteristics of exhaled breath such as "patterns and rates of respiration, biomarkers of inflammation and the potential detection of airborne pathogens."

Smart masks monitor the presence of SARS-CoV-2 protease in exhalate. The mask includes a blister pack, which, when broken, triggers a chemical reaction. The chemical reaction turns the sensor blue if the virus is detected.

Significant protease is needed to achieve a correct result from the sensor (prevent a false negative). Breath contains protease only once the cells die. They make their way out of the body in fluids such as saliva, and through breathing.

=== Smart lenses ===
Smart lenses can record intraocular pressure. The lens conforms to the eyeball and contains sensors that monitor glucose levels, eye movement, and biomarkers for some diseases. Built into the lenses are electronics and processors that collect data. Smart lenses have the potential to "incorporate displays that superimpose information onto what the wearer sees."

=== Smart textiles ===
Smart textiles can monitor skin temperature and metabolites. These textiles contain sensors that are composed of substrate, active elements, and electrode/interconnect. Smart textiles can provide a way for individuals to diagnose abnormalities. These sensors face challenges such as "the selection of suitable substrates, biocompatible materials, and manufacturing techniques, as well as the instantaneous monitoring of different analysts[sic], the washability, and uninterrupted signal display circuits."

QR codes can be embedded into a textile. Performance apparel can increase airflow during exercise.

==== Manufacturing ====
Several methods are used to manufacture e-textiles from fiber to garment and insert electronics. One method is to print circuits onto a fabric using conductive ink. Conductive ink includes metal fragments to provide electrical conductivity. Another method uses conductive thread or yarn. Non-conductive fiber (such as polyester PET) with conductive material such as gold or silver to produce coated yarns or an e-textile.

Common fabrication techniques include traditional methods:

- Embroidery
- Sewing
- Weaving
- Non-woven
- Knitting
- Spinning
- Breading
- Coating
- Printing
- Laying

==== Smart rings ====
Smart rings can monitor blood pressure.

=== Microneedle patches ===
Microneedle patches have been developed to monitor metabolites, inflammation markers, drugs, etc. They are beneficial for "improved immunogenicity, dose-sparing effects, low manufacturing costs...ease of use...and greater acceptability compared to traditional hypodermic injections." Microneedle patches are expected to expedite vaccinations making it more applicable, efficient, and cost effective.

=== Auditory ===
Computers worn in, on or around ear(s) may include ear buds, headphones, microphones, hearing aids, fitness trackers.

=== Epidermal (skin-attached) ===
Epidermal electronics is an emerging technology, termed for properties and behaviors comparable to those of the epidermis. These wearables are mounted directly onto the skin to continuously monitor dermal/subdermal physiological and metabolic processes. The devices communicate wirelessly. Epidermal electronics focus on fitness and medical monitoring.

Usage is limited by fabrication processes. Fabrication techniques include lithography and printing on a carrier substrate before attaching to the body.

Their significance involves their mechanical properties, which resemble those of skin. Skin can be modeled as bilayer, composed of an epidermis with Young's Modulus (E) of 2–80 kPa and thickness of 0.3–3 mm and a dermis with E of 140–600 kPa and thickness of 0.05–1.5 mm. Together this bilayer responds plastically to tensile strains ≥ 30%, below which the skin's surface stretches and wrinkles without deforming. Epidermal electronics behave similarly. Like skin, epidermal electronics are ultrathin (h < 100 μm), low-modulus (E ≈70 kPa), and lightweight (<10 mg/cm^{2}), enabling them to conform to the skin without strain. Conformal contact and proper adhesion enable the device to bend and stretch without failure, surmounting challenges limiting conventional, bulky wearables, including measurement artifacts, hysteresis, and motion-induced skin irritation. By conforming to the skin, epidermal electronics can accurately acquire data without altering skin's natural motion or behavior.

Epidermal devices may adhere to the skin via van der Waals forces or elastomeric substrates. With only van der Waals forces, an epidermal device has the same thermal mass per unit area (150 mJ/cm^{2}K) as skin, when the skin's thickness is <500 nm. Along with van der Waals forces, the low values of E and thickness are effective in maximizing adhesion because they prevent deformation-induced detachment. Introducing an elastomeric substrate can improve adhesion but slightly raises the thermal mass per unit area. Possible materials include photolithography-patterned serpentine gold nanofilm and patterned doping of silicon nanomembranes.

==== Foot-worn ====
Smart shoes are an example of wearable technology that incorporate smart features into shoes. Smart shoes can work with smartphone applications to support tasks unavailable with standard footwear. Uses include vibrating the smart phone to tell users when and where to turn to reach their destination via Google Maps or self-lacing.

Self-lacing sneaker technology is another use of the smart shoe. In 2019 Puma's Fi laceless shoe was recognized as one of the "100 Best Inventions of 2019" by Time for its use of micro-motors to adjust the fit from an iPhone. Nike introduced a smart shoe in 2019 known as Adapt BB. The shoe featured buttons on the side to loosen or tighten the fit with a custom motor and gear, which could be controlled by a smartphone.

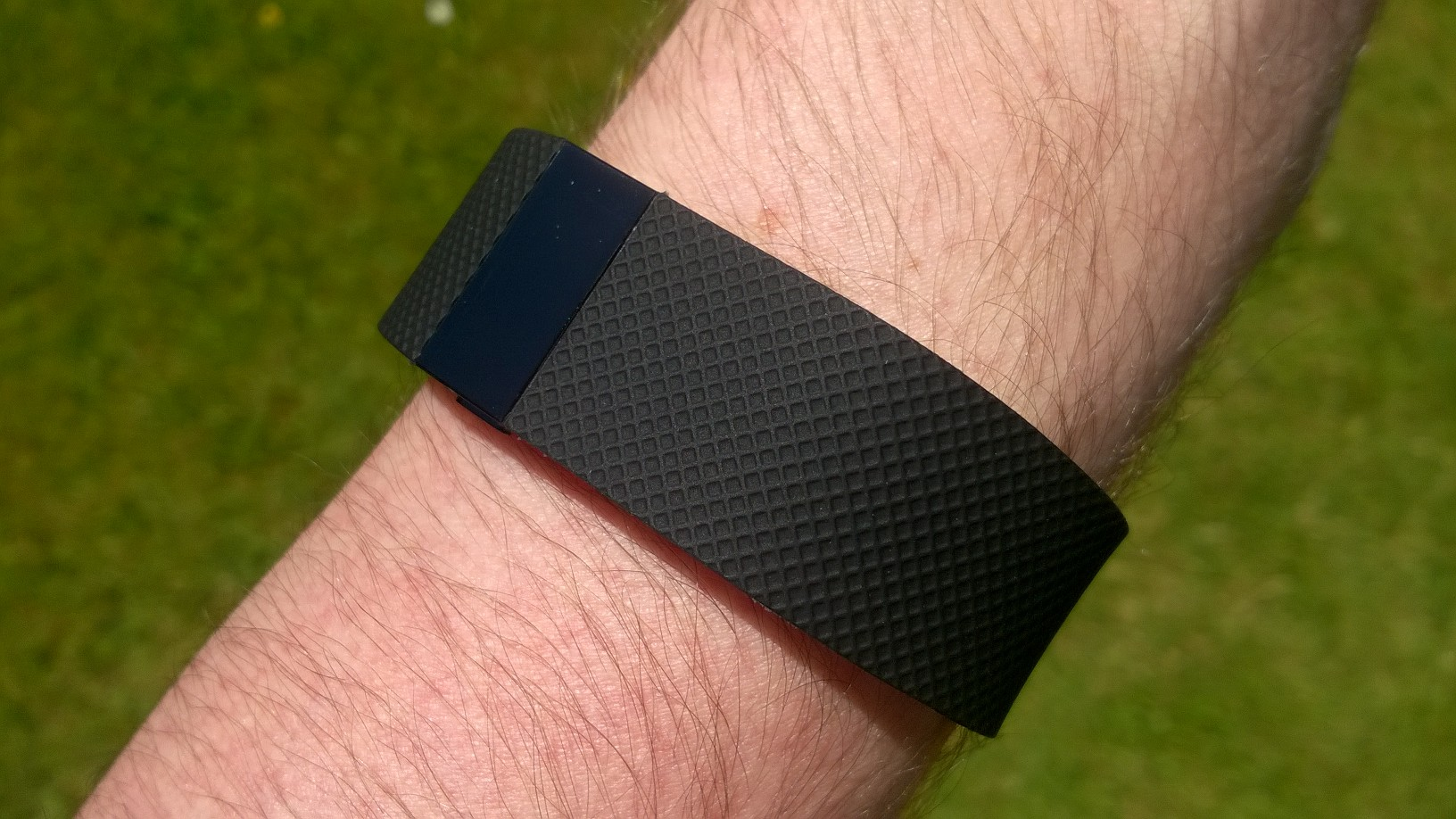
The Fitbit, a modern wearable device

== Interface design ==
Presenting information quickly and in a limited space is a factor in the design of wearable user interfaces (UI).

Most wearables adopt a simple design that supports devices with varying, typically small, screen sizes, resolutions, and processing power. Responsiveness and simple interactions are crucial to wearables as many operations must be accomplished with one hand or even one finger.

Privacy settings and data-sharing controls must be accessible and understandable, especially for health-related data collectors. A 2019 survey from the University of Fort Hare reported that 52% of participants were unfamiliar with security policies, 47% had no concern over who had access to their private data, 35% who were largely aware of the information stored or transmitted on their devices, and only a quarter of participants backed up sensitive data routinely and tested recovery periodically. The study reported that half of the respondents did not understand that their health information needed protection. Formal assessment or peer review remains largely unexplored in the context of wearable devices.

== Issues and concerns ==
The FDA guidance for low risk devices advises that health wearables are general wellness products if they collect only data on weight management, physical fitness, relaxation or stress management, mental acuity, self-esteem, sleep management, or sexual function. The FDA drafted this guidance to decrease patient risk in case the app malfunctions. Although wearables can help track health and promote independence, proper privacy protections are complex.

Google Glass was used by surgeons to track patient vital signs, although privacy issues emerged relating to third party use of unconsented information.

Data breaches exposed weaknesses in cybersecurity that allow private data to be accessed by hackers and their customers. An example is the case of 23andMe.

The demanding reliability requirements of wearables given complex electronics, limited computing power, limited memory, non-conventional form factors, data scale, communication patterns, and battery limitations—all these factors can contribute to failure modes, such as resource starvation or device hangs. Tools exist to assess reliability and security. One result is the potential for overloading devices, resutlting in device failure.

The Strava fitness tracking app inadvertently exposed the location of U.S. military personnel in conflict zones. Strava's "heat map" feature (not a hack) revealed the presence of military bases and allowed access to sensitive information such as names, movement patterns, and even heart rates.

Period-tracking apps faced criticism for sharing user data with third-party companies for targeted advertising. Users reported receiving ads for products to alleviate menstrual symptoms shortly after logging their cycles on the Flo app. The Apple Watch tracks ovulation through temperature monitoring, which in regions where abortion is illegal, could be used in legal cases.

=== Surveillance ===
Wearables can provide data for corporate health and wellness programs. However, employers could theorectically repurpose the data that wearables collect for objectives other than health such as worker surveillance.

Data is not typically owned by users, but by the company that produces the wearable. In such cases, raw data can be sold to third parties for use in surveillance.

=== Bias ===
Health monitoring devices typically use photoplethysmography (PPG), a sensing method that uses red and green light sensors to measure heart rate and blood oxygen levels. A 2023 study reported that the accuracy of PPG sensors may be affected by skin pigmentation, as higher levels of melanin can absorb light and affect signal detection. That study reported that this may result in reduced measurement accuracy for darker-skinned individuals.

=== Accessibility ===
High prices can limit access to wearables, with lower-cost devices reported as less reliable.

=== Disability ===
Wearables present challenges for users with disabilities, such as costs, compatibility, and limitations such as battery life, durability and comfort.

== See also ==
- Assistive technology
- Ai Pin and Rabbit r1
- Apple Vision Pro
- Clothing technology
- Computer-mediated reality
- Cyborg
- Extended reality (Spatial computing)
- Flexible electronics
- GPS watch
- Neuralink
- Powered exoskeleton
- Smart, connected products
- Quantified self
- Wearable computer
- Internet of Musical Things
- Transhumanism
