= Chura =

Chura may refer to:

- Chura (knife), a version of the Pesh-kabz knife
- Chura (bangles), bangles worn by an Indian bride on her wedding day
- Ch'ura, a mountain in the Andes of Peru
- HD 145457 b, an exoplanet named Chura

== See also ==
- Chuda State, a former princely state in present Gujarat, western India
- Chuhra, a caste in India and Pakistan
- Chuda (disambiguation)
- Choorian (disambiguation)
- Shura (disambiguation)
