= Gana (thread) =

Scared thread

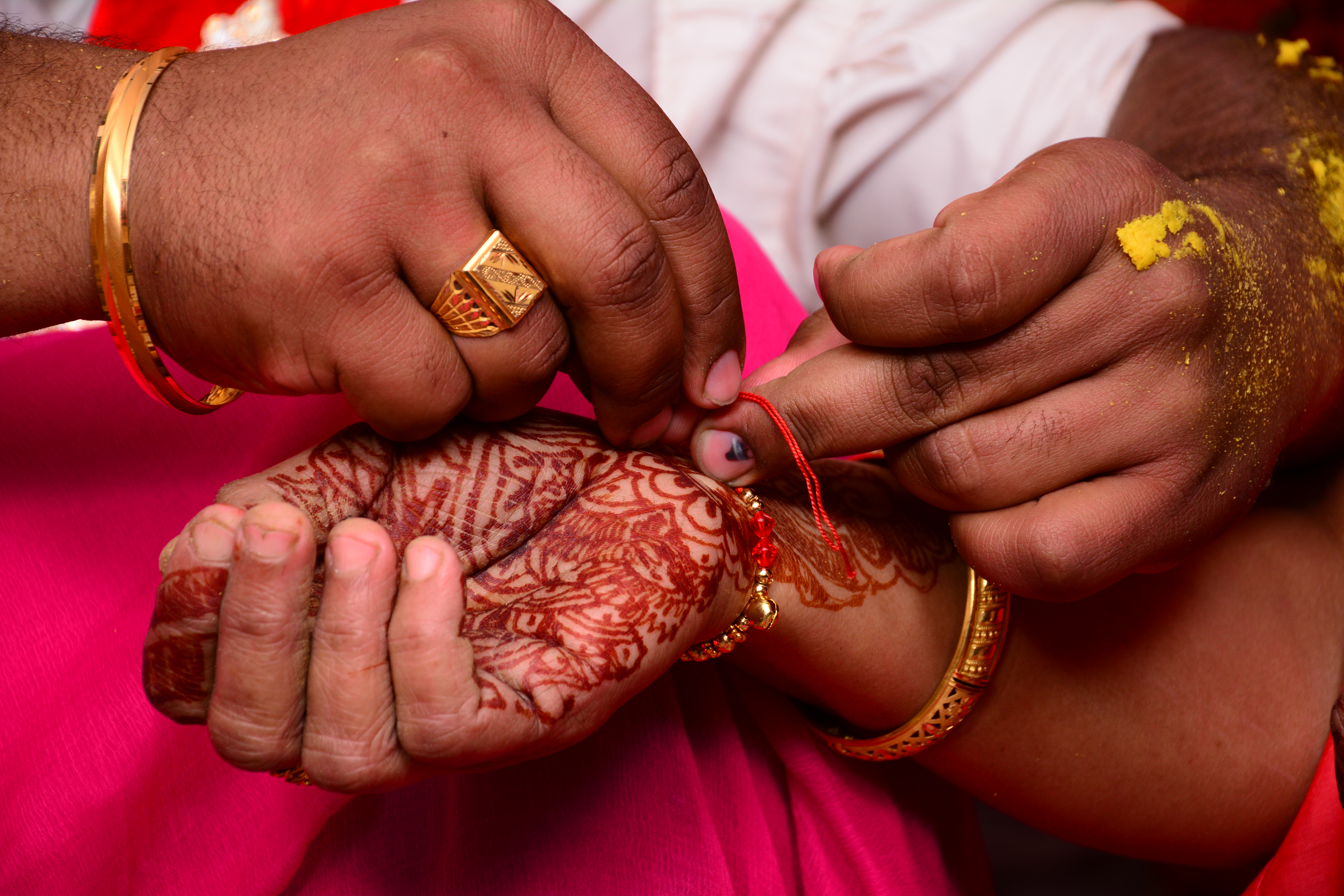

Gana is a decorative sacred red thread tied around the wrists of the bride, groom, and their guests prior to some Asian weddings. In Punjab, India, the bride’s maternal uncle typically ties it on her wrist during the chura ceremony. Among the Barad tribe in northern India, during the ceremony of mayian, the gana is customarily tied on the groom by his maternal uncle, while the bride receives hers from her mother or another maternal relative.
