= Chuda =

Chuda may refer to the following places in Gujarat, western India :

- Chuda State, a former princely state
- a town in Surendranagar District, which was the seat of the above state
- Chura (bangles)

== See also ==
- Chura (disambiguation)
- Choorian (disambiguation)
- Chudamani (disambiguation)
