= Choorian =

Choorian may refer to:

- Choora or choori (plural choorian or chooriyan), traditional bridal bangles in India
- Choorian, a Pakistani film franchise, including
  - Choorian (1963 film), directed by Amin Malik
  - Choorian (1998 film), directed by Syed Noor
- Choodiyan, an Indian television drama broadcast by Sony Entertainment Television
- Chooriyan, a 2015 Indian Punjabi-language film starring Vinod Khanna

== See also ==
- Chura (disambiguation)
- Chuda (disambiguation)
