= Chudamani (disambiguation) =

Chudamani is a type of hair ornament.

Chudamani may also refer to:

- Chudamani Khadka, Nepali politician
- Chudamani Raghavan, Indian writer
- Chudamani Vihara, Indian monastery

== See also ==
- Chuda (disambiguation)
- Mani (disambiguation)
