= Bangle =

Type of bracelet

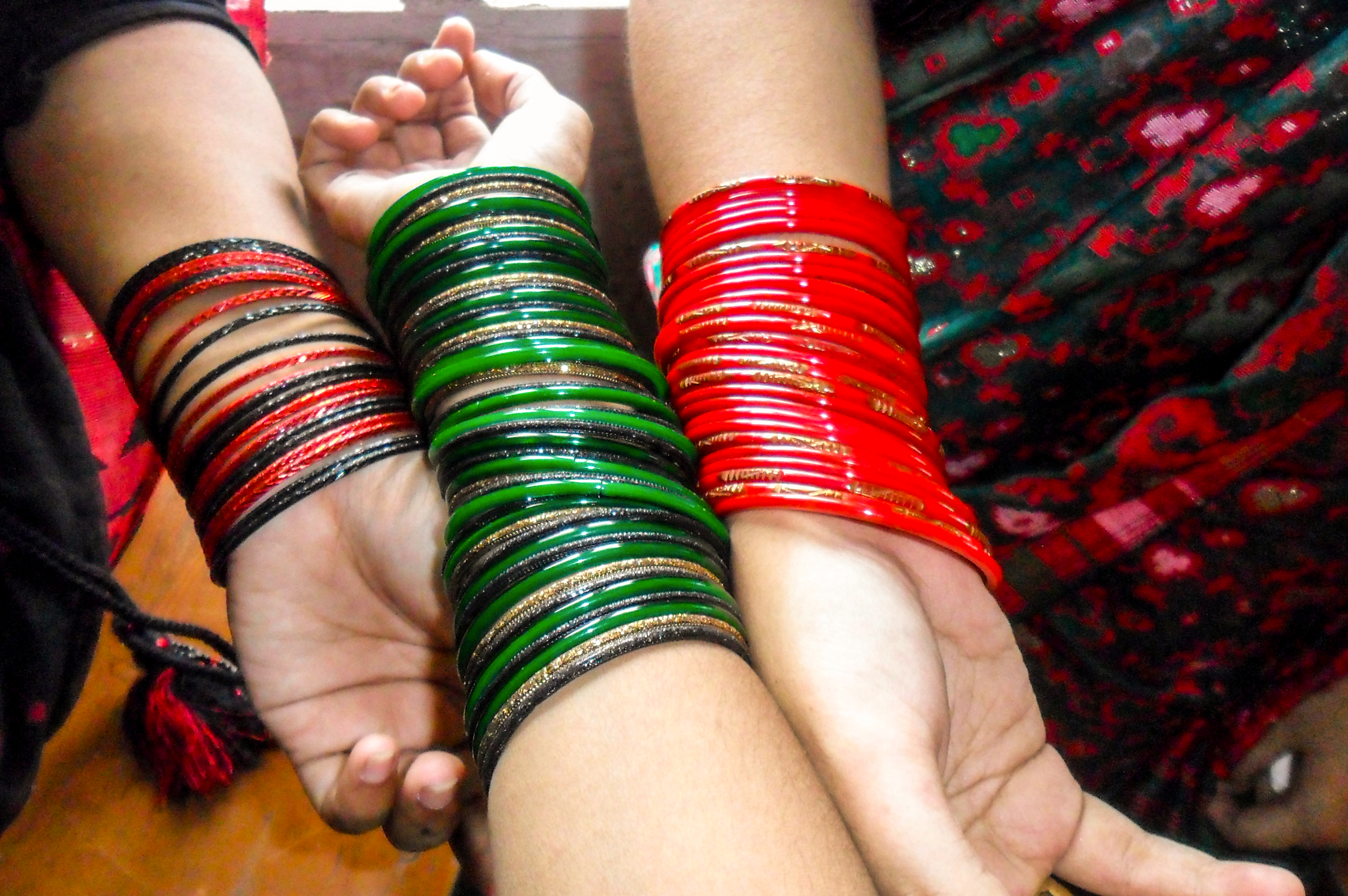
Indian women wearing Reshmi bangles

A bangle is a traditionally rigid bracelet which is usually made of metal, wood, glass or plastic. These ornaments are worn mostly by women in India, Southeastern Asia, the Arabian Peninsula, and Africa. It is common to see a bride wearing glass bangles at weddings in India. Bangles may also be worn by young girls. Some men and women wear a single bangle on the arm or wrist called kada or kara.

Chooda is a kind of bangle that is worn by Hindu/Sikh Punjabi women on their wedding day. It is a set of white and red bangles with stonework.

In Punjabi wedding tradition, a bride receives her chooda from her maternal uncle and aunt.

Firozabad, Uttar Pradesh is India's largest producer of bangles.

== History ==
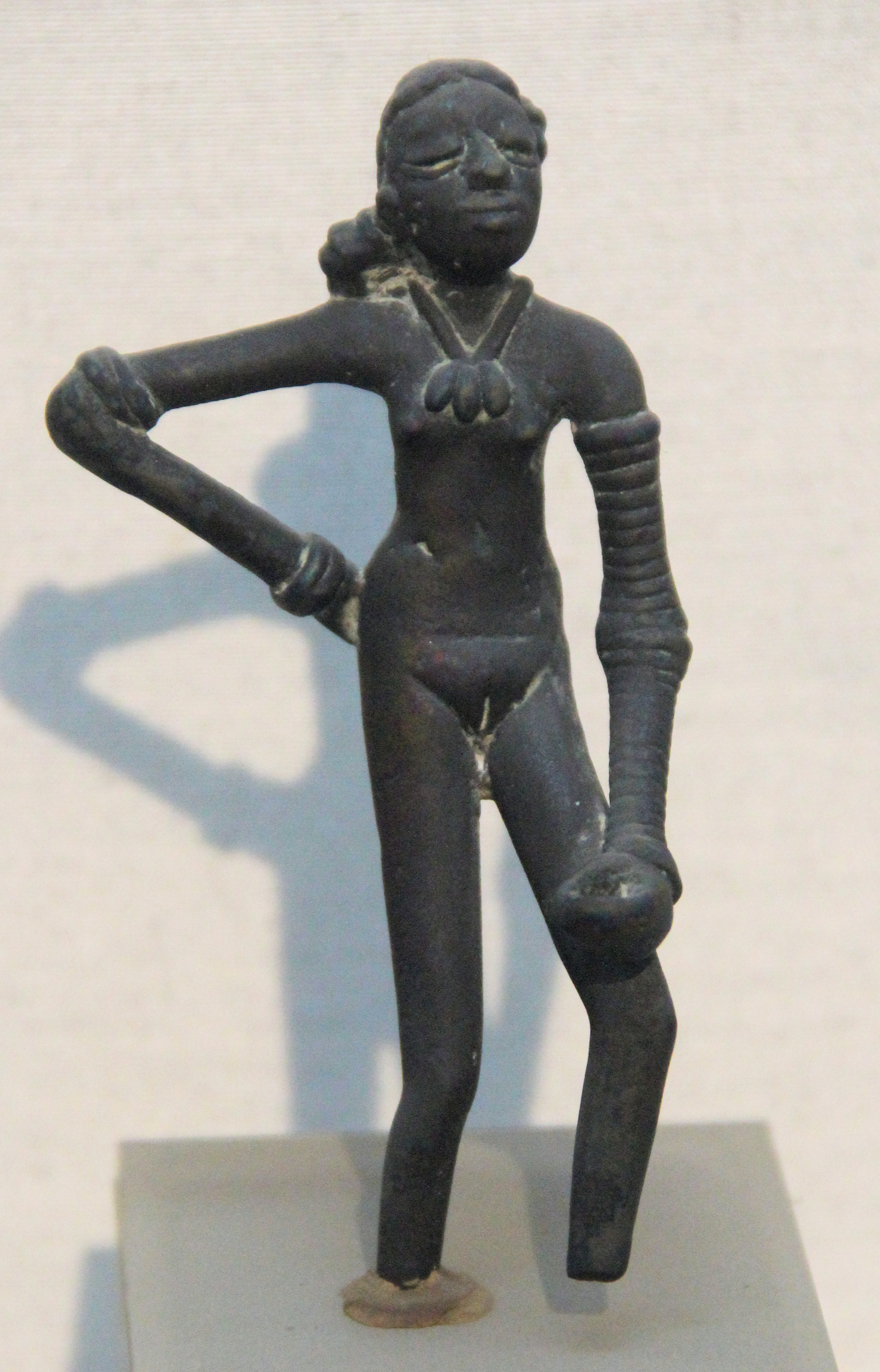
Dancing girl of Mohenjo-daro (2300–1750 BCE)

Bangles made from sea shell, copper, bronze, gold, agate, chalcedony, etc. have been excavated from multiple archaeological sites throughout the Indian subcontinent. A figurine of a dancing girl wearing bangles on her left arm has been excavated from the Mohenjo-daro archaeological site (2600 BC) in modern-day Pakistan. Other early examples of bangles in ancient India include copper samples from the excavations at Mahurjhari, followed by the decorated bangles belonging to the Mauryan Empire (322–185 BC) and the gold bangle samples from the historic site of Taxila (6th century BC). Decorated shell bangles have also been excavated from multiple Mauryan sites. Other features include copper rivets and gold-leaf inlay in some cases.

== Design ==
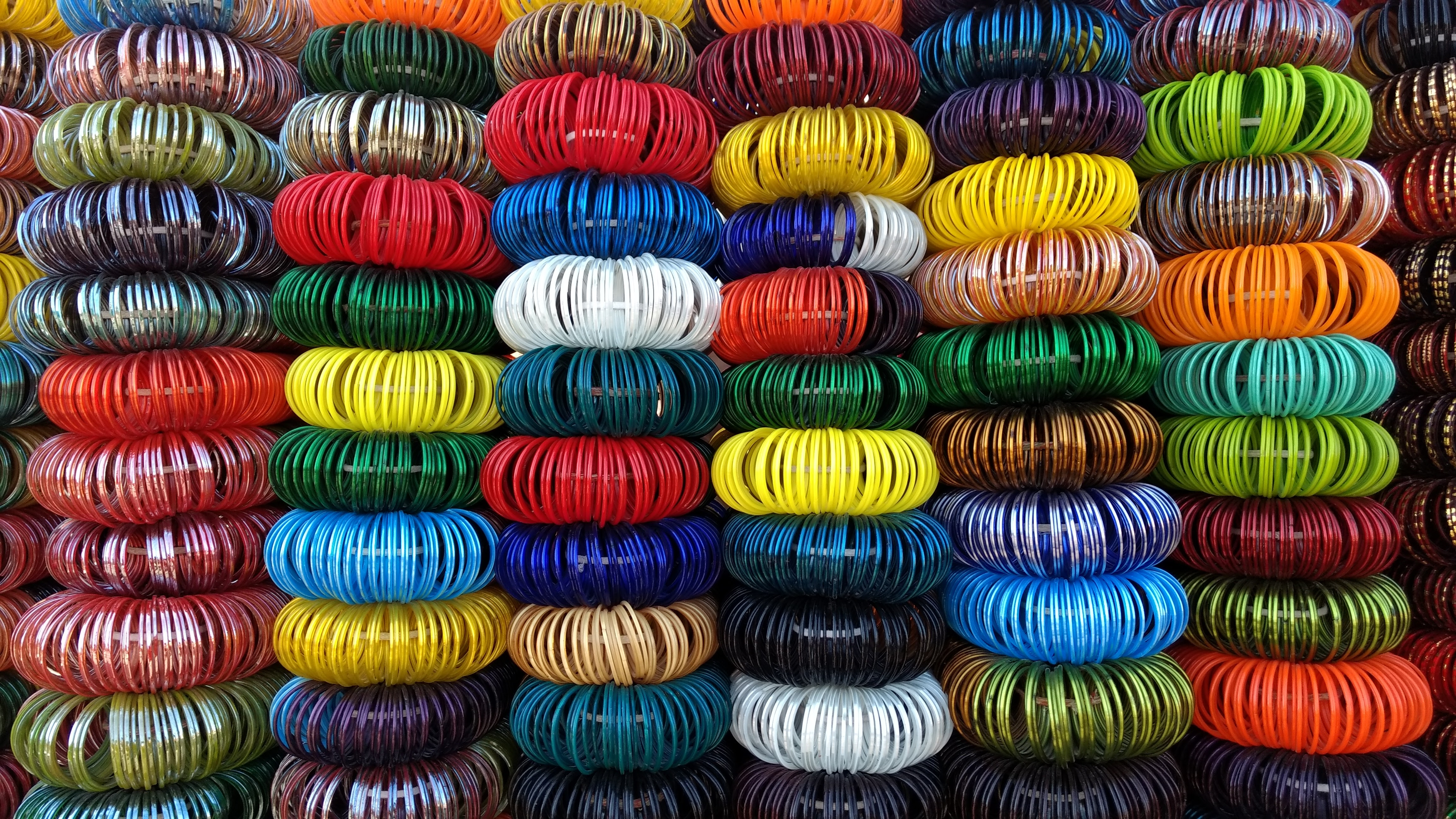
Bangles made of glass stacked for sale in Jodhpur, India

Bangles are circular in shape, and, unlike other bracelets, are not flexible. The word is derived from Hindi bangri (glass bracelet). They are made of numerous precious as well as non-precious materials such as gold, silver, platinum, glass, wood, ferrous metals, plastic, etc. Bangles made from sea shell, which are white colour, are worn by married Bengali and Oriya Hindu women.

Bangles are part of traditional Indian subcontinent jewellery. They are sometimes worn in pairs by women, one or more on each arm. It is also common for women to wear a single bangle or several bangles on just one wrist. Gold and glass bangles are sometimes worn together, including by brides in parts of India. Plastic bangles are also available, but glass bangles continue to be worn at traditional occasions such as marriages and festivals. Bangles have traditionally been associated with married women in India. Bangles also form part of the jewellery worn in some Indian dance forms, including Bharatanatyam.

The designs range from simple to intricate handmade designs, often studded with precious and semi-precious stones such as diamonds, gems, and pearls. Sets of bangles may make a jingling sound when worn together.

== Types ==
There are two basic types of bangles: a solid cylinder type; and a split, cylindrical spring opening/closing type. Bangles may be made from glass, jade, metal, lac, rubber or plastic.

One factor that adds to the price of the bangles is the artifacts or the further work done on the metal. This includes embroidery or small glass pieces or paintings or even small hangings that are attached to the bangles. Bangles made from lac are one of the traditional types. Lac is a resinous material, secreted by insects, which is collected, heated and moulded to make these bangles. Among the more recent kinds are rubber bangles, worn more like a wristband by youngsters, and plastic ones which add a trendy look.

Normally, a bangle worn by people around the world is simply an inflexible piece of jewellery worn around the wrist. However, in many cultures, especially those from Indian cultures and the broader Indian subcontinent, bangles have evolved into various types in which different ones are used on different occasions.

The following are some popular designs of bangles in India:

1. Jadau Bangles (Also known as Kundan);
2. Meenakari Bangles;
3. Lac or Lakhs Bangles.

Bangles, in India, are worn by both married and unmarried women. A chura is a set of bangles traditionally worn by a bride on her wedding day and for a period after, especially in Punjabi weddings.

High gold prices have encouraged some Indian brides to choose imitation bangles and other costume jewellery instead of gold jewellery.

== Production ==
- Hyderabad, India, has a historic world-famous market for bangles named Laad Bazaar.
- Glass bangles are mostly produced in the old Indian city of Firozabad in North India.
- In Pakistan, glass bangles are produced mainly in Hyderabad, Sindh and plastic full arm bangles are produced in Tharparkar, Badin, Umerkot and Sanghar.

== Gallery ==
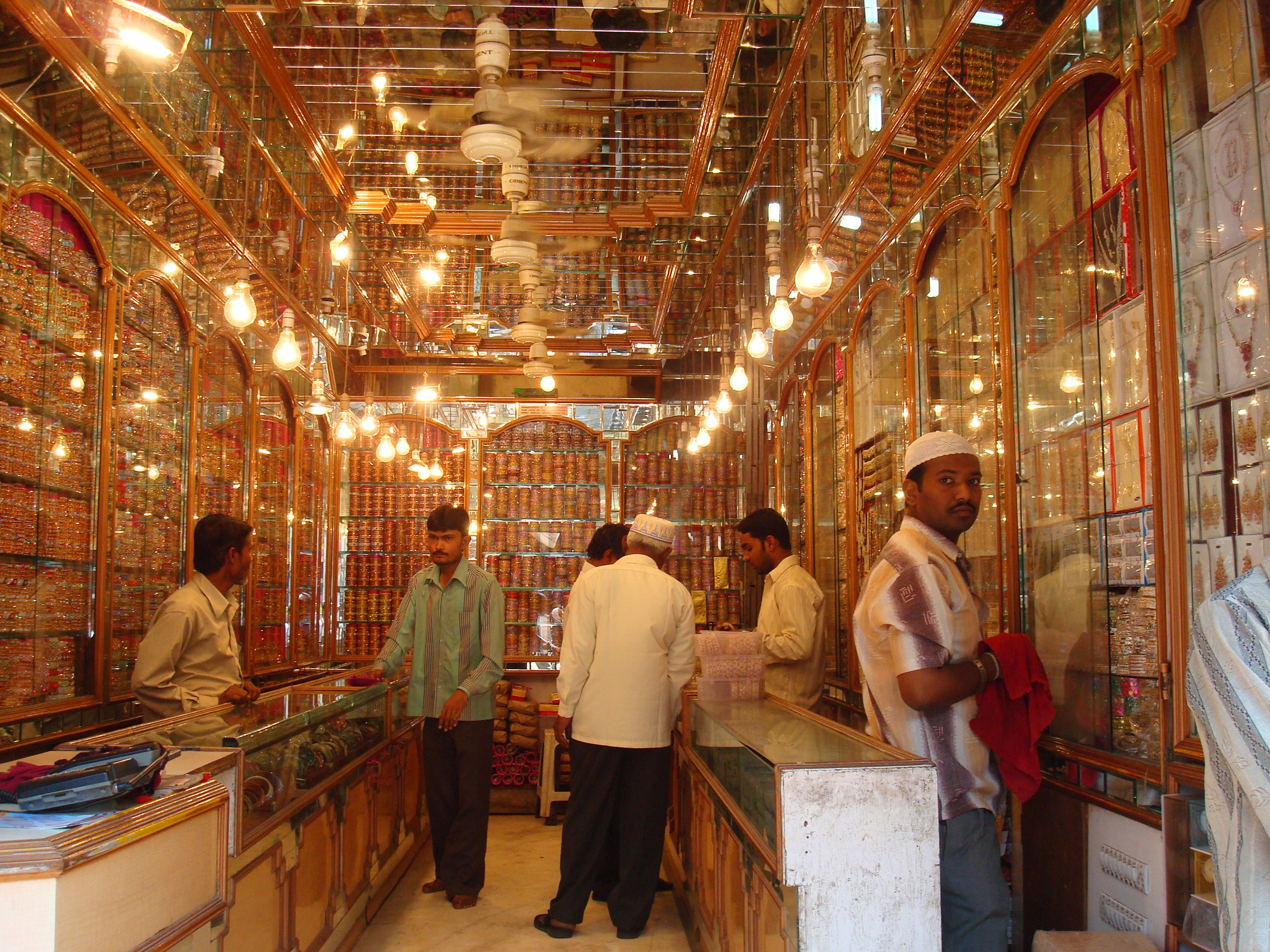
Laad Bazar

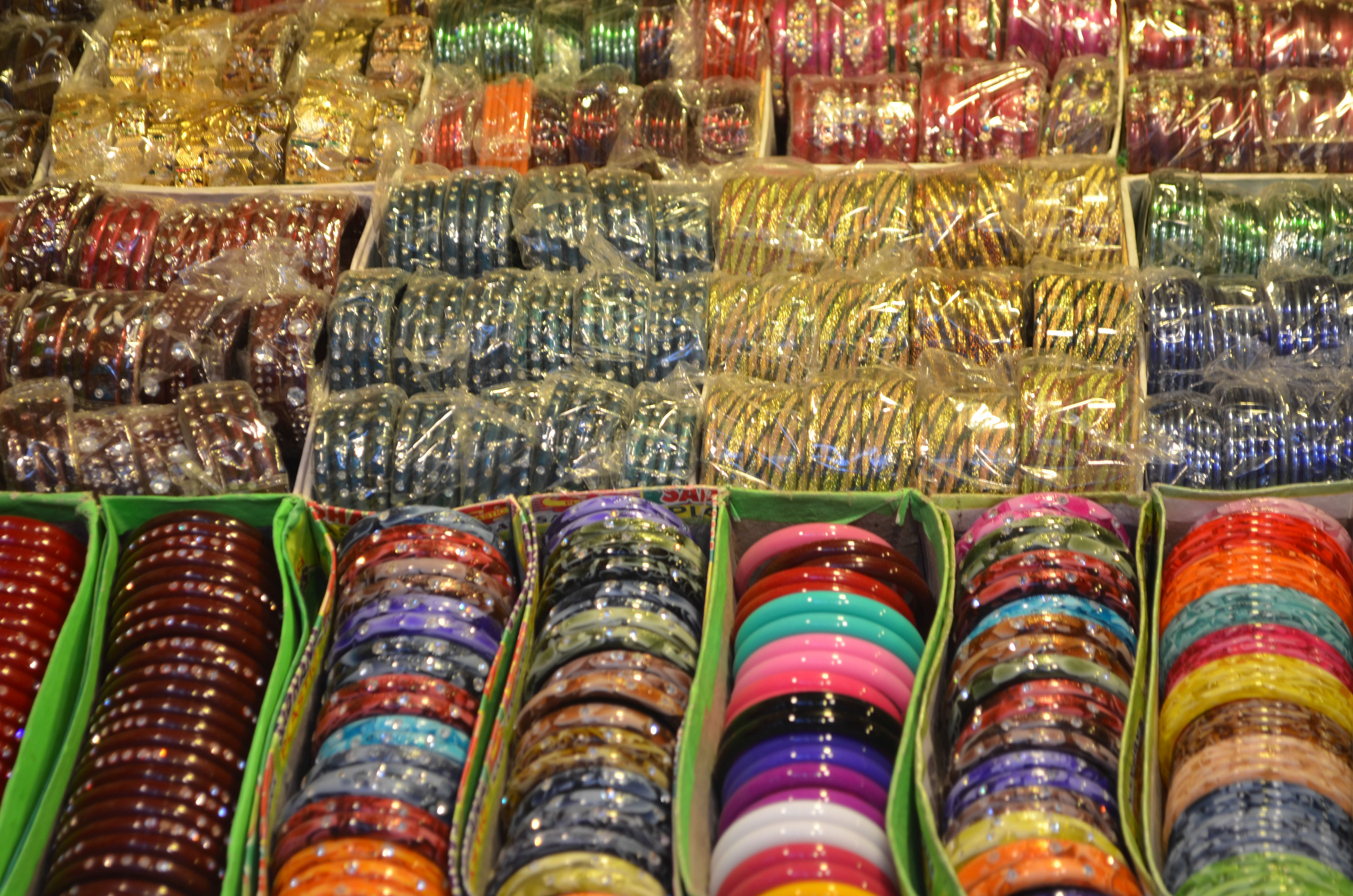
Multicolor glass bangles in Gangotri

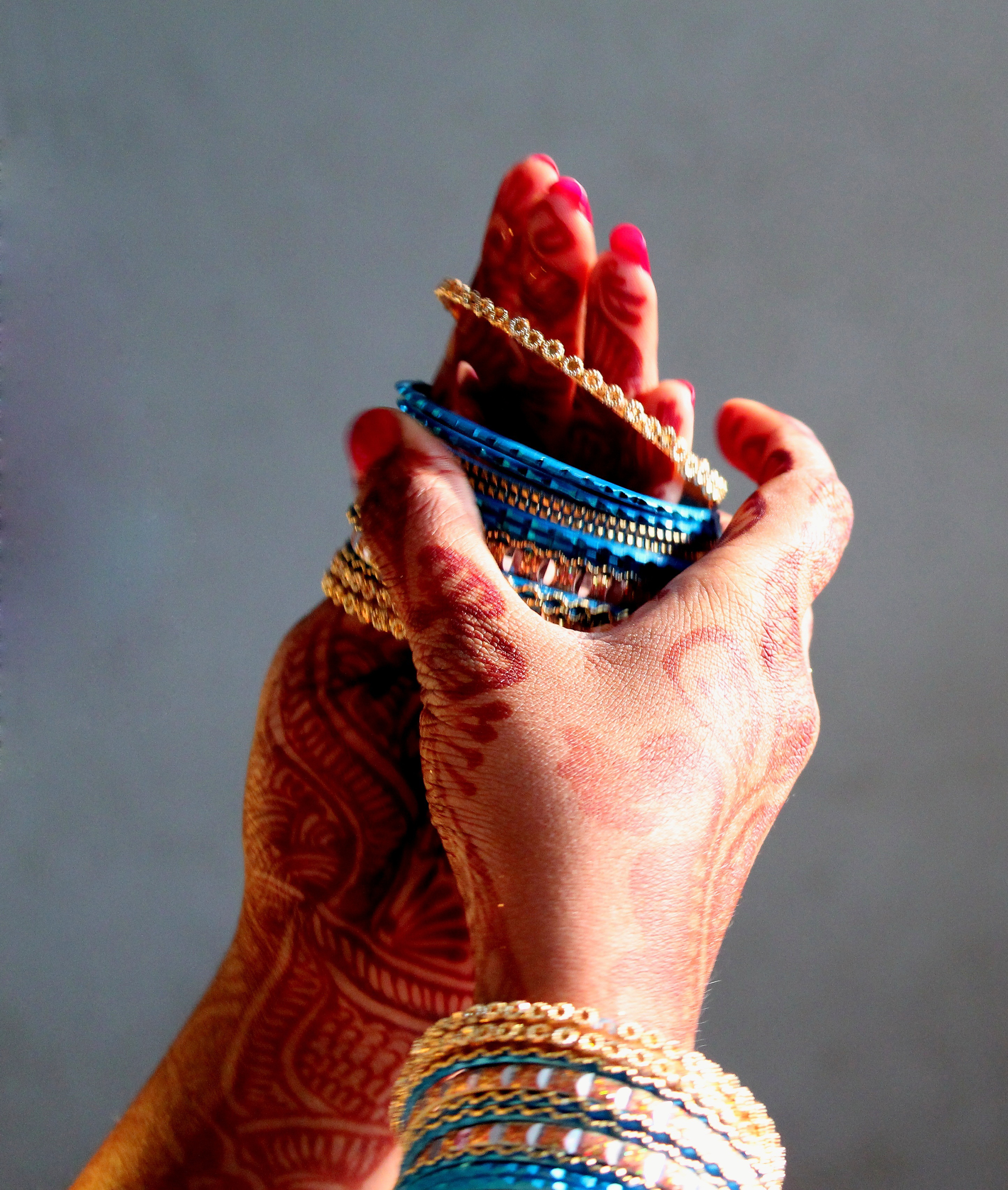
Tamil bangles

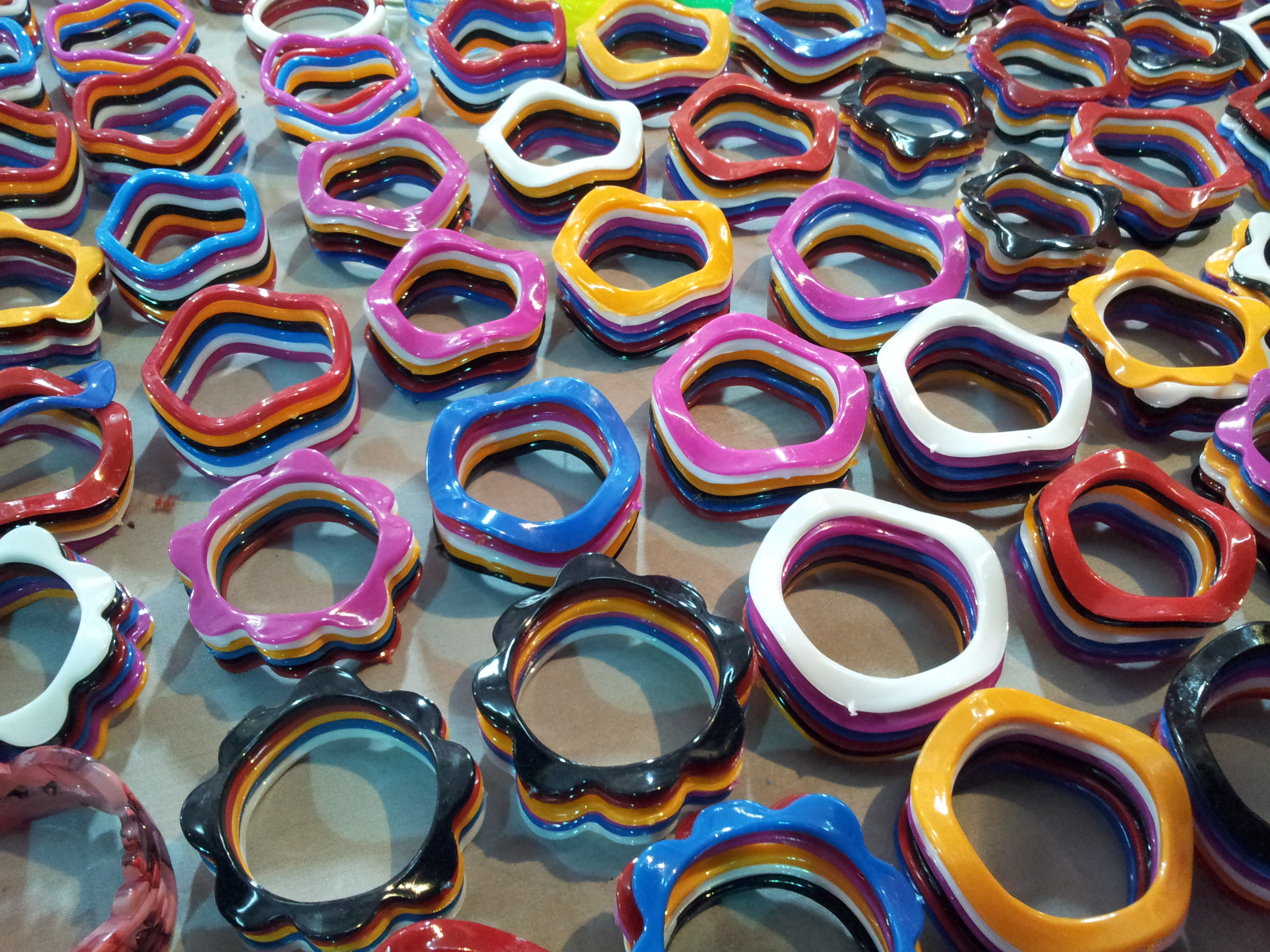
Plastic Bangles, Bangalore

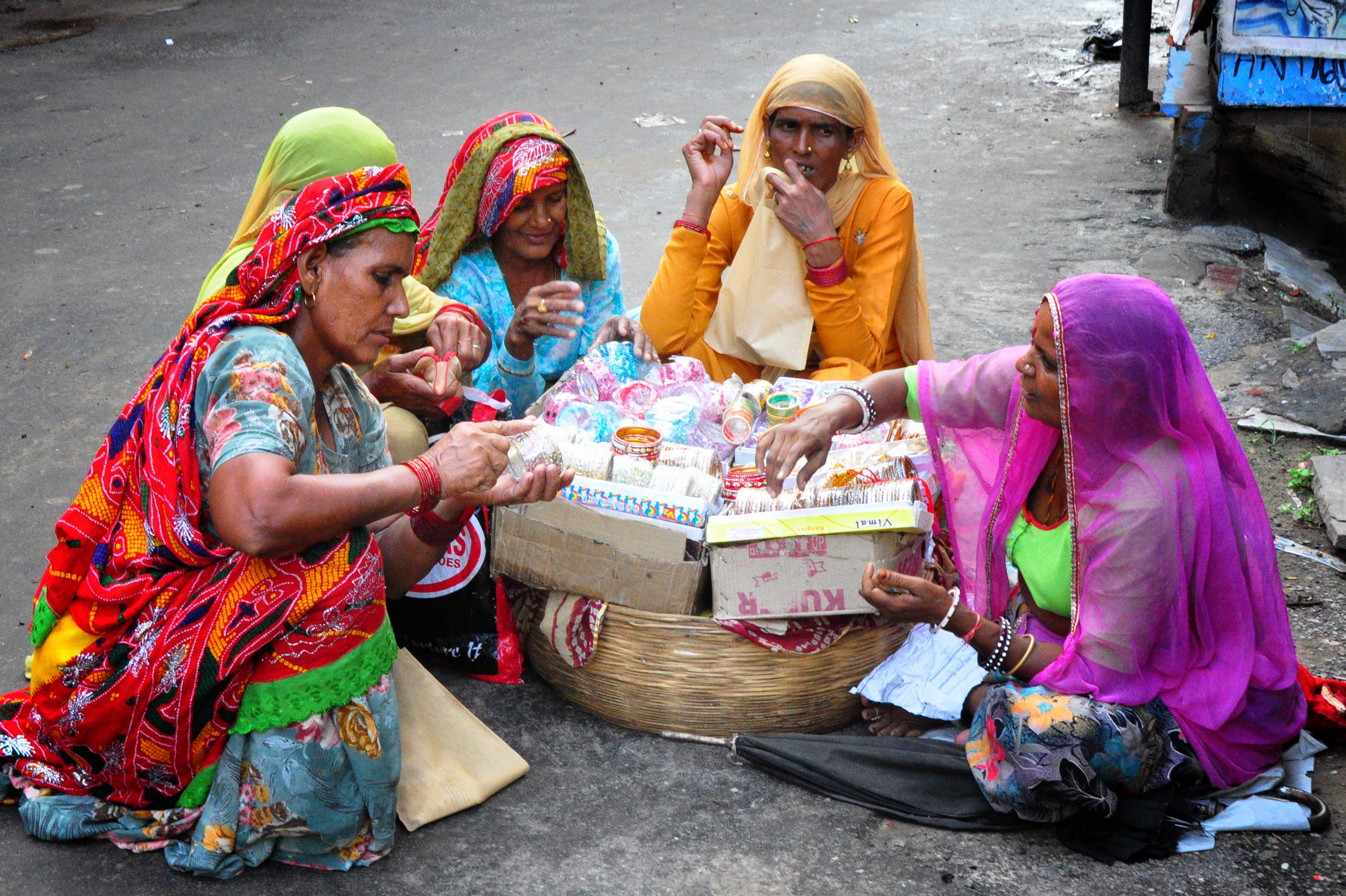
Women's Business, Pushkar, India

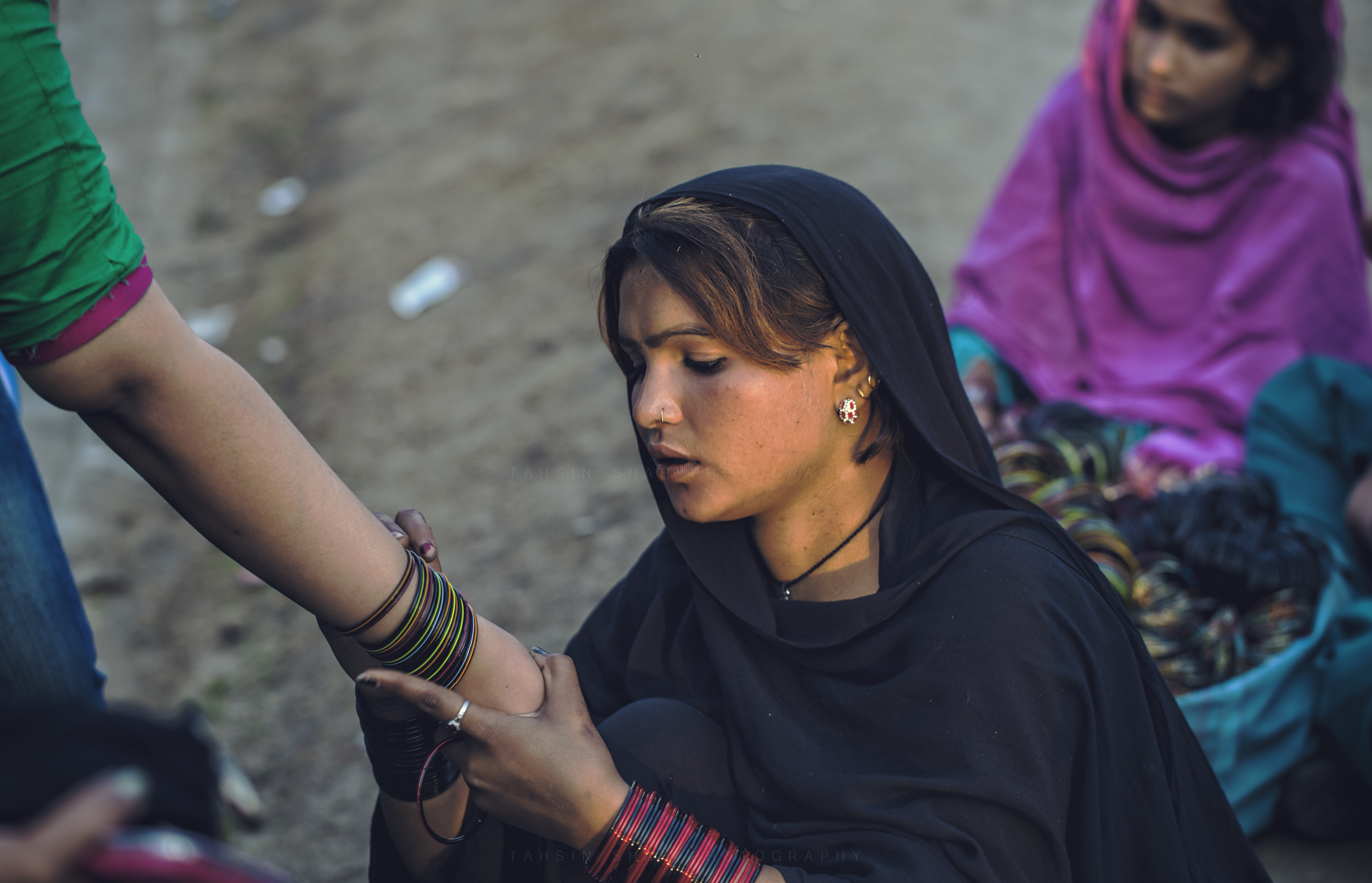
The vendor women sell bangles made of glass in variety of colours and designs which is very popular among the women.

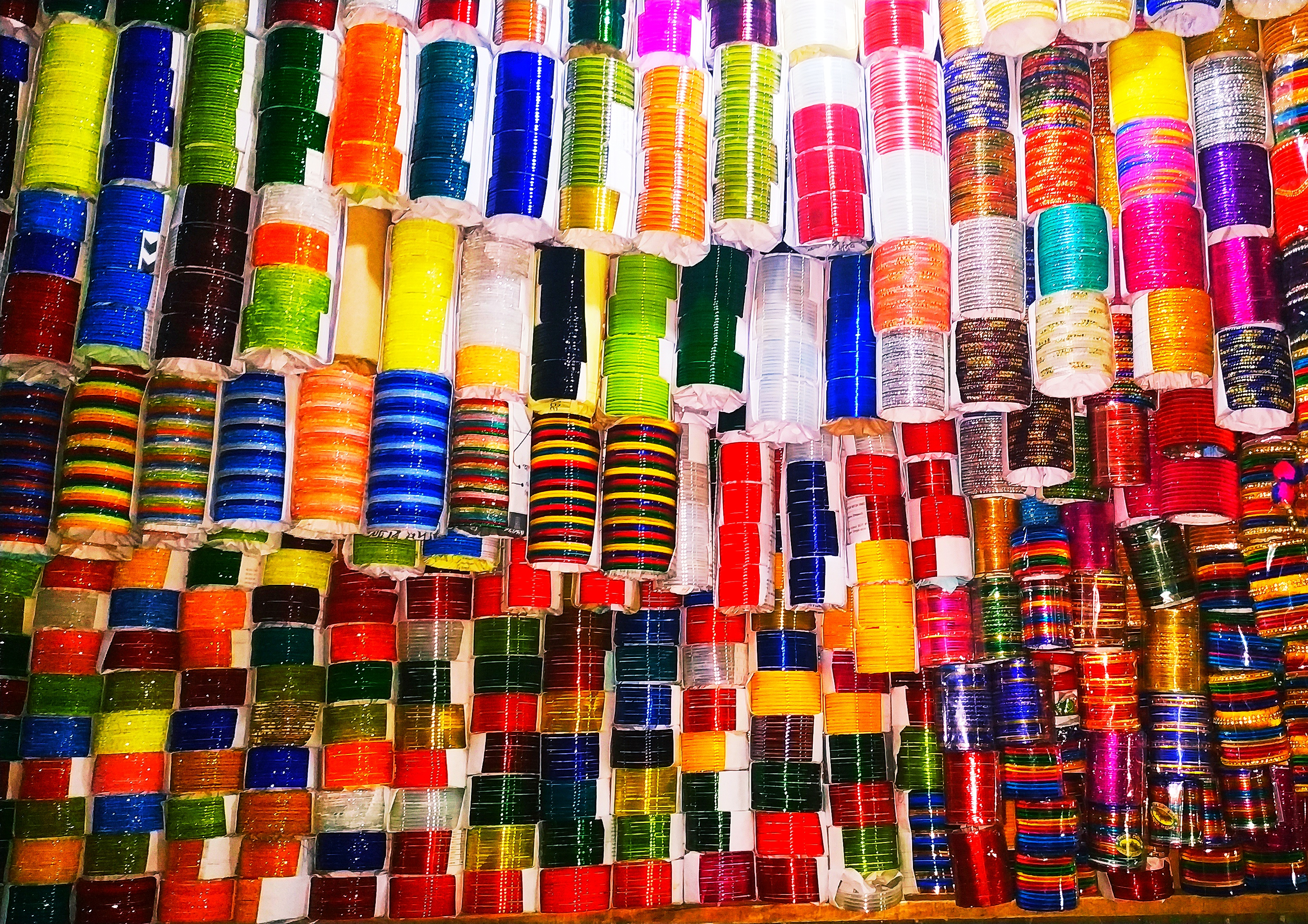
Bangles at a shop

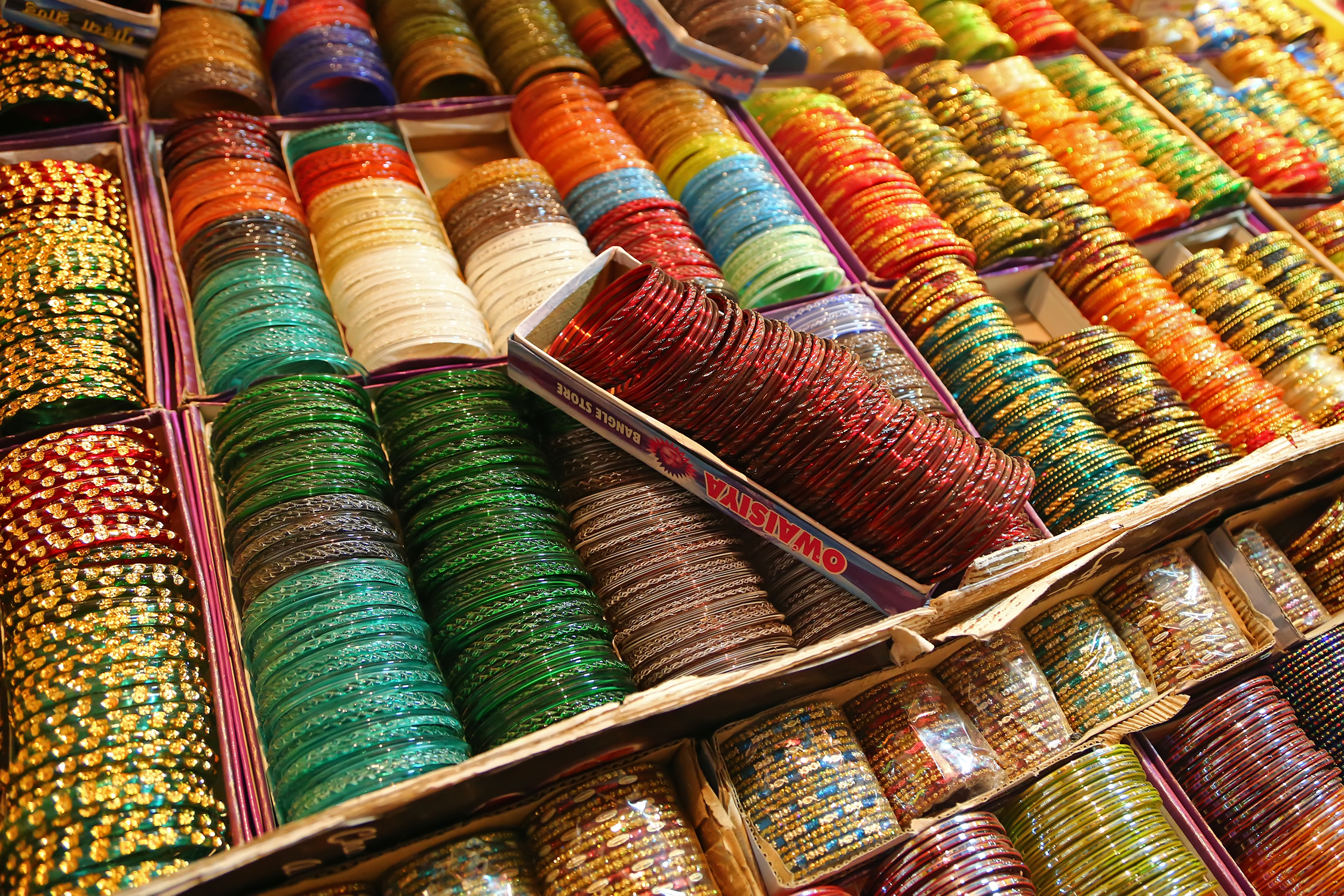
Bangles for sale

== See also ==
- Choora
