= Shura (disambiguation) =

Shura ("council") is a method of decision-making in Islamic cultures.

In Russia, Shura is one of the diminutives of Alexander or Alexandra.

Shura may also refer to:

== Legislative bodies ==
- Majlis-ash-Shura, type of Shura Council in government
- Shura Council, former name of the Senate (Egypt)
- Leadership Council of Afghanistan
- Consultative Assembly of Saudi Arabia
- Consultative Assembly of Qatar
- Consultative Assembly (Oman)
- Consultative Council (Bahrain)
- Islamic Consultative Assembly
- Shura Council, the upper house of the Parliament of Yemen
- Parliament of Pakistan

== People ==
- Shura Tegleva (1894–1955), Russian nursemaid who served in the Imperial Household
- Shura Cherkassky (1911–1995), American classical pianist
- Shura Taft (born 1982), English-born Australian television and radio presenter
- Mary Francis Shura (1923–1991), American writer
- Shura (English singer) (born 1988)
- Shura (Russian singer) (born 1975)
- Shura Baryshnikov (born 1981), American dancer

== Religion ==
- Ash-Shura, the 42nd sura of the Qur'an
- Shura, an alternative Japanese term referring to one of the six realms of reincarnation; the kanji are also used in the name for the Buddhist entities known otherwise as asura

== Arts and entertainment ==
- Shura mono, a theme in Noh, a major form of classical Japanese musical drama
- Shura, a character in the Soul series of fighting games
- Capricorn Shura, a character from the Japanese manga Saint Seiya
- Shura ending, one of four possible endings in the 2019 action-adventure video game Sekiro: Shadows Die Twice, derived from the Japanese term for asura.
- Shura, a 1971 Japanese film

== Other ==
- Hamas Shura Council, the leadership of Hamas
- Shura (rural locality), several rural localities in Russia
- Shura, a Tatar journal published between 1908–1918 in the Russian Empire
- In Persian, including in Dari and Tajik, shuravi شوروی (Tajik: Шӯравӣ) is the term used for a soviet (workers' council); the word is etymologically related to shura (council).
- Shura Base, an Israeli military base used for forensic identification of fallen soldiers
