= Mayian =

Punjabi wedding preparation ceremony

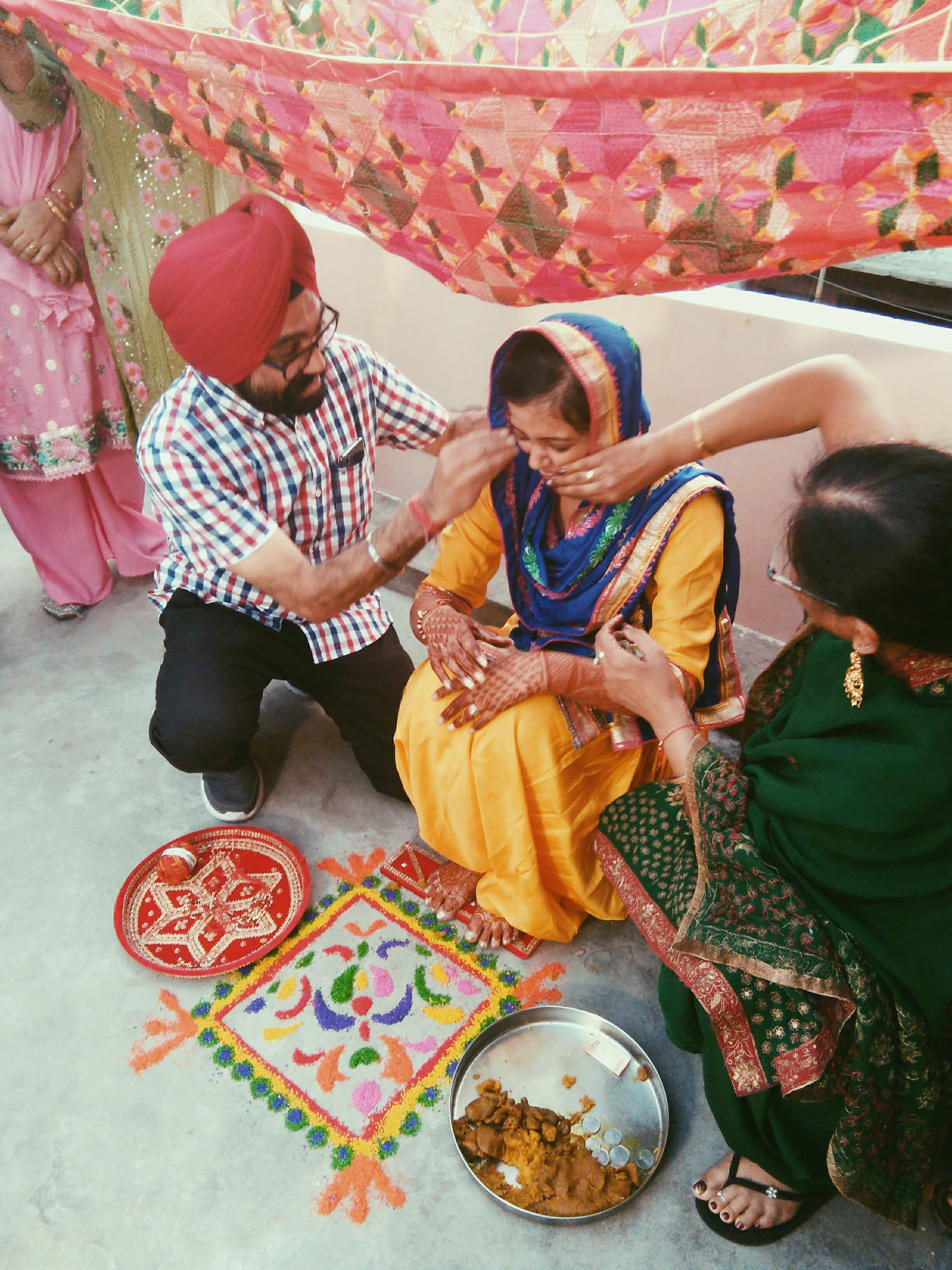
A Sikh family during the Batna ceremony

Mayian, also known as Vatna Maiyun, Haldi, or Ubtan, is the term used for the preparation ceremony one day before Punjabi weddings of India and Pakistan. This ceremony is usually done in the morning but sometimes done in the late afternoon or early evening. After this ceremony the bride and groom take a shower and get ready for the wedding. The Ceremony usually takes place at the couple's parental homes. It consists of many rites, including the Batna, Choora, Jaggo, fireworks and sometimes the ladies Sangeet and mehndi . In South Indian weddings a similar ceremony takes place called the "Pithi" ceremony.

== Ceremony ==
One day before the wedding, the ceremony of mayian is performed at the couple's respective homes. The prospective bride or groom is seated on a wooden plank called a patri, and a red cloth is held above by four female relatives, while married women of the household and biradari, led by the mother, rub a paste of turmeric, flour and mustard oil on his or her face, arms and legs. During the ritual women sing traditional songs and those of the biradari receive the ritual gift of gogley (Punjabi sweets specially cooked for weddings) at the end of the ceremony. The ritual has been documented both in Punjab and among Sikh communities in Britain, reflecting its continuity in diaspora contexts.

=== Choora ===
On the morning before the wedding, a ritual of choora or chura is performed at the bride-to-be's residence, involving a set of ivory and red bangles. Her maternal uncle makes a gift of clothes, jewellery and some cash called nankey-shak. He puts the bangles on his niece while the women sing traditional songs depicting the role of maternal uncles. Before the wedding ceremony, the bride-to-be takes a ritual bath and dresses in the clothes in which she will be wed, provided by her maternal uncles. Similarly, the bridegroom-to-be also receives a set of clothes called sherwani from his maternal uncles which he, too, wears at the wedding ceremony. It signifies the importance of the role of the mother's natal family at the wedding rituals, and reinforces the alliance established at the mother's own wedding.

=== Batna/ Vatna ===
In the Batna/ Vatna rite, the couple's families rub yellow turmeric paste upon their legs, face, and arms while sitting on a patri (a special red board with embroidery) below a red cloth held by four women. This is done to cleanse and balance the body for married life.

=== Jaggo ===
In the Jaggo ceremony, the family dances and sings on the road in front and around the beautifully decorated wedding home. Jaggo is held in the last hours of the night. Copper vessels called "gaffers" are decorated with divas (clay lamps), filled with mustard oil, and lit. The bride/bridegroom's maternal aunt (mammi) carries it on her head, and another lady carries a long stick with bells, which she shakes. The ladies then go into other friends' and families' homes to be welcomed with sweets and drinks. They dance there and move on. It is a solemn ceremony filled with joy, dancing, fireworks, and food. The Ladies Sangeet (Ladies' Night of Singing) and mehndi party might follow the mayian and dinner.

Haldi Matkor, a pre-wedding turmeric ritual in the Magahi region
