= Shura (rural locality) =

Shura (Russian: Шура) is the name of several rural localities in Russia:

- Shura, Kirov Oblast, a village in Podgortsevsky Rural Okrug of Yuryansky District in Kirov Oblast; 59°1′N 49°12′E
- Shura, Mari El Republic, a village in Pektubayevsky Rural Okrug of Novotoryalsky District in the Mari El Republic; 57°7′N 48°19′E
- Shura, Republic of Tatarstan, a selo in Arsky District of the Republic of Tatarstan
