= Chudamani =

Indian jewelry

A Judamani (Hindi: चूडामणि) is a lotus-shaped Indian headdress that is usually studded with jewels. It is worn in the center of a knot of hair. The headdress derives its name from chuda (Hindi:चूड़ा) meaning 'bundle of hair' and mani (Hindi:मणि) meaning 'jewel'. Chudamani also called "khopa" in marathi worn by brides during wedding ceremonies in Maharashtra. When a Chudamani is studded with rubies, it is known as an Aruna Chudamani.

== Legend ==
The goddess Ratnakar Nandini was born during Samudra Manthana. Upon seeing God Vishnu, Ratnakar Nandini devoted herself to him. When she met Vishnu, he gave her a jewel-studded ornament named Chudamani.

Mahalakshmi was instead married to Vishnu and Ratnakar Nandini was left by herself. Vishnu advised her to go to the Trikuta Mountain and meditate there during Dvapara Yuga and Treta Yuga, blessing and fulfilling devotees wishes.

While setting out for penance Ratnakar Nandini gave Chudamani as a souvenir to Vishnu. On watching this, Indra was tempted to get the Chudamani. Vishnu gave it to him, who in turn placed it in the hair of Indrani (Indra's wife). When the native of Indra, Swarga (Heaven) was attacked by a Demon named Shambarasur, Indra sought help from Dashratha. Dasharatha along with Kaikeyi came to the rescue of Indra and defeated Shambarasur. As a token of appreciation, Indra gifted wings of four swans belonging to Mandakini. Indrani gifted her Chudamani to Kaikeyi and gave the boon that the lady wearing this will remain Akhand Saubhagyawati (she will die with married bliss) and the kingdom she lives in will remain unconquered. Kaikeyi gifted this to Sumitra who in turn gave it to Seeta, Shree Ramachandra's wife. Seeta gave it to Mahaveer Hanuman as a signage when he returned from Lanka to Shree Ramachandra after finding Sita.

== History ==
The Chudamani has been worn since the Satavahana dynasty. Sculptures of Amaravati and Nagarjunakonda can be seen wearing Chudamani.

== Gujarat ==
In Gujarat, ivory bangles are known as Chuda or Chudamani. The bride receives them from her mother's family just before marriage and it is worn during the marriage ceremony.
