= Chura (bangles) =

Bride's adornment traditional in India

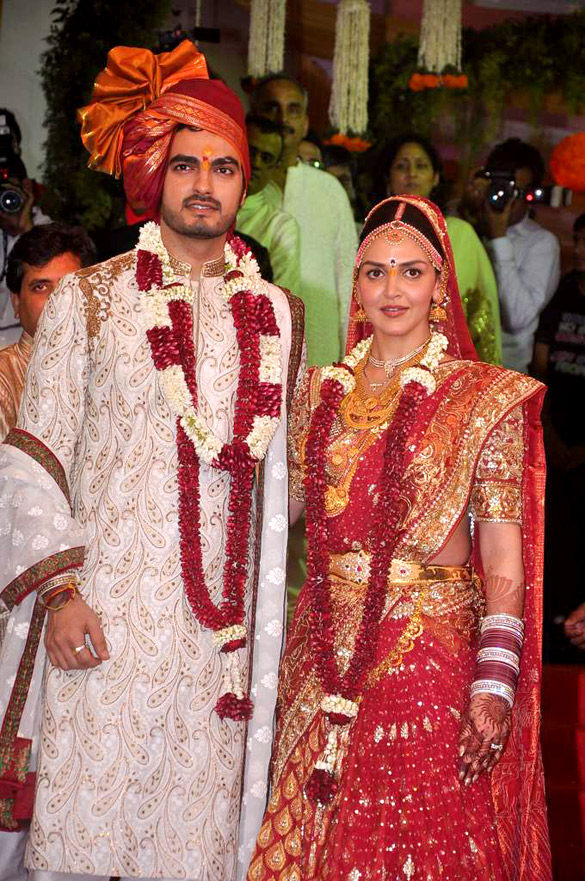
Esha Deol wearing chura at her wedding

Chura (in Hindi-Urdu), chuda, or chudlo (in Gujarati) is a set of bangles traditionally worn by a bride on her wedding day and for a period after, especially in Indian weddings.

== Materials and appearance ==
The chura is usually red and white; sometimes the red bangles are replaced with another colour, but they are usually only two colours. They are traditionally made of ivory, with inlay work, though now made of plastic. Traditionally there are 21 bangles, although more recently the bride often wears 7, 9 or 11 bangles. The bangles range in size according to the circumference of the top of the forearm and the wrist end so that the set fits neatly.

== Gujarati chudlo ==
In Gujarati tradition, the bridal bangles are referred to as chudlo (ચૂડલો). Traditionally they were made using elephant's tusks/ivory and were known as "haathi daant no chudlo". These bangles are gifted to the bride by her maternal uncle.

Chudlo is generally paired with Gujarati bridal sari known as Panetar. These chudlo bangles are generally red and green in colour to match the Panetar sari. Chudlo has great significance in Gujarati culture as is evident several folk songs like "Chudlo Lyado Ji Meera Bai Pehar Lyo" and "Radha Chudlo Perje Mara Naam Nu".

== Marathi Hirva chuda ==
Hirva chuda, peacock green-coloured chuda bangles are preferably worn by Marathi brides. The green is the colour of fertility and is associated with Devi (Hindu Goddess). In the Devi shrines of Tuljabhavani and Renukadevi, the Goddesses are adorned using Hirva chuda. The Marathi tradition of Hirva chuda during marriage is akin to wearing green bangles during Hariyali Teej in North India. Sometimes, green bangles are also paired with red bangles. The hirva chuda (green bangles) are worn after the haldi oil bath, given by a suvasini and are worn for a year.

== Nepali chura ==
A Nepali chura set is usually made of red-coloured gilded bangles. Chura bangles are often paired with pote (beaded necklace). Chura bangle sets are also worn during Teej celebrations as is evident from Nepali Teej songs like "Chura Tika Laali".

== Bengali and Odia Shakha Pola chura ==
In Odia & Bengali marriages, brides wear red and white set of bangles which are made from sea shell (shankh) and red coral (pola). Thus, Shakha are white bangles made through conch-shell and Pola are red bangles made by red corals. Loha, a large iron bangle covered with gold is also worn along with Shakha Pola chura.

== Assamese Muthi Kharu chura ==
The Muthi Kharu is a traditional and ethnic bangle worn in marriages by the bride also while celebrating Bihu festival in Assam extensively. It has a golden layer and silver in some parts making it more attractive.

== Sindhi chura ==
Sindhi traditional churas were made of ivory and seashells, but today it is made of plastic of different colours like red, blue, green, orange etc are also used unlike traditionally it was only of white colour. Ivory was used to make many jewelries, the Bhambhore city had the biggest ivory workshop in the world.

In Sindh the traditional churas were rings of ivory covering the fore arms or full arms, these were worn by all sects, religions and classes but unlike other parts of India these were not worn as wedding symbol, as unmarried women would also wear Churas, perhaps only till forearms.

There are three different styles/types of such churas worn in Sindh first are Sindhi style, Dhatki style and Marwari style. The traditional churas have been completely abandoned by many Sindhi women of Sindh today and have adopted wearing the red coloured churas made of glass worn usually by bride only on the wedding ceremony, for others glass bangles or silver or gold Kangar/Kara (bracelets) are worn. But many women of Thar still continue to wear the ancient Sindhi churas.

== Customary use ==
Wearing the chura is primarily an Indian Hindu tradition which is also followed by other Indian religious communities culturally. Sindhoor and Mangalsutra— are other adornments worn by married women. The custom is widely observed in Jammu, Himachal, Punjab, Uttarakhand, Haryana, Gujarat, Rajasthan and Madhya Pradesh, Uttar Pradesh. The chura ceremony is held on the morning of the wedding or the day before. The bride's maternal uncle and aunt give her a set of churiyan.

Traditionally, the bride would wear a chura for a full year, although if a newly wed bride became pregnant before her first anniversary, the chura was taken off. When the colour started to fade, her in-laws would actually have it re-coloured, so everyone would know that she had been married for less than a year. On an auspicious holiday, usually Sankranti, after the first anniversary her in-laws would hold a small intimate ceremony in which the chura was removed and glass churiyan (bangles) were placed on both hands. This usually was accompanied with mithai (Indian sweets) and a monetary shagun. The chura then was taken to a river and a prayer was said and it was left to float onto the water. Afterwards the woman could wear other chura in any colour for as long as she liked.

It is now normal for the bride to wear her chura for a month and a quarter (40 days). As the chura is made of fragile materials, Indian custom has it that the bride may refrain from heavy housework in her marital home to keep it intact for the 40 days, as a kind of honeymoon. After that, in traditional homes at least, she takes over the lion's share of domestic work from her mother-in-law.
